= Orienteering at the 2025 World Games – Women's middle distance =

Women's middle distance at the 2025 World Games
- Venue: Eastern New Area Orienteering Venue, Chengdu, China
- Date: 8 August
- Competitors: 40 from 23 nations
- Winning time: 40:08

Medalists
1st place, gold medalist(s)		Simona Aebersold	Switzerland
2nd place, silver medalist(s)		Tereza Šmelíková	Slovakia
3rd place, bronze medalist(s)		Alva Sonesson	Sweden

The women's middle-distance competition at the 2025 World Games took place on 8 August at the Eastern New Area Orienteering Venue in Chengdu, China.

== Competition format ==
A total of forty athletes from twenty-three different nations qualified, based on a point system, taking in consideration both the Orienteering World Ranking and the results from the 2024 World Orienteering Championships.

== Results ==
The results were a follows:

Rank	Athlete	Nation	Time
1st place, gold medalist(s)	Simona Aebersold	Switzerland	40:08
2nd place, silver medalist(s)	Tereza Šmelíková	Slovakia	43:52
3rd place, bronze medalist(s)	Alva Sonesson	Sweden	46:26
4	Tereza Rauturier	Czech Republic	47:26
5	Emma Bjessmo	Sweden	47:50
6	Rita Máramarosi	Hungary	48:22
7	Hanna Müller	Germany	49:37
8	Natalia Gemperle	Switzerland	49:51
9	Elza Ķuze	Latvia	51:27
10	Birte Friedrichs	Germany	51:42
11	Sandra Grosberga	Latvia	52:26
12	María Prieto	Spain	54:05
13	Hanna Sudoł	Poland	54:16
14	Ewa Bernaciak	Poland	54:33
15	Milla Key	Australia	55:04
16	Olena Babych	Ukraine	55:14
17	Luo Qiong	China	56:17
18	Tille De Smul	Belgium	58:09
19	Laura Robertson	New Zealand	58:31
20	Anna Pradel	Italy	58:48
21	Caitlin Young	Australia	59:58
22	Hao Shuangyan	China	1:01:04
23	Chu Ying Yau	Hong Kong	1:02:05
24	Kaho Kondo	Japan	1:05:33
25	Mairi Eades	Great Britain	1:06:39
26	Kana Higuchi	Japan	1:08:24
27	Hannula-Katrin Pandis	Estonia	1:09:26
28	Caterina Dallera	Italy	1:09:57
29	Sarah Wimberley	South Africa	1:11:06
30	Ana Defez	Spain	1:11:45
31	Mariana Ostetto	Brazil	1:13:59
32	Zara Stewart	New Zealand	1:15:47
33	Man Wing	Hong Kong	1:16:19
34	Esther Marnet	Brazil	1:20:48
35	Lin Jo-shui	Chinese Taipei	1:37:53
	Rachel Brown	Great Britain	DNF
	Denisa Králová	Czech Republic	DNF
	Csilla Gárdonyi	Hungary	DNF
	Anna Groll	Austria	DNF
	Ylvi Kastner	Austria	DNF
