= Orienteering at the 2025 World Games – Women's sprint =

Women's middle distance at the 2025 World Games
- Venue: Eastern New Area Orienteering Venue, Chengdu, China
- Date: 10 August
- Competitors: 40 from 23 nations
- Winning time: 15:00

Medalists
1st place, gold medalist(s)		Simona Aebersold	Switzerland
2nd place, silver medalist(s)		Natalia Gemperle	Switzerland
3rd place, bronze medalist(s)		María Prieto	Spain

The women's sprint competition at the 2025 World Games took place on 10 August at the Eastern New Area Orienteering Venue in Chengdu, China.

== Competition format ==
A total of forty athletes from twenty-three different nations qualified, based on a point system, taking in consideration both the Orienteering World Ranking and the results from the 2024 World Orienteering Championships.

== Results ==
The results were a follows:

Rank	Athlete	Nation	Time
1st place, gold medalist(s)	Simona Aebersold	Switzerland	15:00
2nd place, silver medalist(s)	Natalia Gemperle	Switzerland	15:53
3rd place, bronze medalist(s)	María Prieto	Spain	16:25
4	Sandra Grosberga	Latvia	16:26
5	Tereza Rauturier	Czech Republic	16:40
6	Rita Máramarosi	Hungary	16:46
7	Alva Sonesson	Sweden	16:50
8	Hanna Müller	Germany	17:10
9	Denisa Králová	Czech Republic	17:38
10	Anna Groll	Austria	17:46
10	Tille De Smul	Belgium	17:46
12	Hanna Sudoł	Poland	17:49
13	Csilla Gárdonyi	Hungary	18:16
14	Emma Bjessmo	Sweden	18:17
15	Milla Key	Australia	18:18
16	Caitlin Young	Australia	18:20
17	Rachel Brown	Great Britain	18:32
18	Tereza Šmelíková	Slovakia	18:36
19	Elza Ķuze	Latvia	18:37
20	Birte Friedrichs	Germany	18:38
20	Ewa Bernaciak	Poland	18:38
22	Hannula-Katrin Pandis	Estonia	18:41
23	Caterina Dallera	Italy	18:49
24	Laura Robertson	New Zealand	18:52
25	Kaho Kondo	Japan	19:11
26	Man Wing	China	19:19
27	Mariana Ostetto	Brazil	19:20
28	Hao Shuangyan	China	19:42
29	Anna Pradel	Italy	19:58
30	Chu Ying Yau	Hong Kong	19:59
31	Kana Higuchi	Japan	20:16
32	Luo Qiong	China	20:35
33	Zara Stewart	New Zealand	20:36
34	Olena Babych	Ukraine	20:49
35	Sarah Wimberley	South Africa	22:06
36	Mairi Eades	Great Britain	22:11
37	Ana Defez	Spain	22:13
38	Esther Marnet	Brazil	26:11
39	Lin Jo-shui	Chinese Taipei	29:50
	Ylvi Kastner	Austria	DSQ
