= Chinese Taipei at the 2025 World Games =

- IOC code: TPE
- NOC: Chinese Taipei Olympic Committee

in Chengdu, China 7 August 2025 – 17 August 2025
- Competitors: 131 (68 men and 63 women) in 14 sports and 63 events
- Medals Ranked 15th: Gold 5 Silver 6 Bronze 4 Total 15

World Games appearances
- 1981; 1985; 1989; 1993; 1997; 2001; 2005; 2009; 2013; 2017; 2022; 2025

Chinese Taipei competed at the 2025 World Games held in Chengdu, China from 7 to 17 August 2025. "Chinese Taipei" is the designated name used by Taiwan to participate in some international organizations and almost all sporting events. Athletes representing Taiwan won five gold medals, six silver medals and four bronze medals. The country finished in 15th place in the medal table.

== Medalists ==
Medal	Name	Sport	Event	Date
Gold	Chen Yue-ting; Hung Ning-hsuan; Ko Wen-lin; Lai Ting-yu; Lin Meng-zhu; Lu Yi-jia; Tien Chia-hsin; Tien Chia-jung	Tug of war	Women's outdoor 500 kg	10 August
Gold	Liu Chiao-hsi	Freestyle inline skating	Women's speed slalom	16 August
Gold	Chiang Kai-chieh	Powerlifting	Men's equipped middleweight	16 August
Gold	Onix Chang; Rin Huang; Jack Wang; Juby Chu; Cindy Wang; Joy Wu	Korfball	Beach tournament	17 August
Gold	Yang Sen	Powerlifting	Men's equipped super heavyweight	17 August
Silver	Huang Mei-chien	Finswimming	Women's 50 metre bi-fins	10 August
Silver	Kuo Li-yang	Track speed skating	Men's dual time trial 200 metre	14 August
Silver	Chao Tsu-cheng	Track speed skating	Men's point race 5,000 metre	14 August
Silver	Liu Yi-hsuan	Track speed skating	Women's sprint 500 metre + d	14 August
Silver	Hsieh Tsung-ting	Powerlifting	Men's equipped lightweight	16 August
Silver	Chiang Ting-en; Tu Ya-ting; Ho Yi-fan; Yeh Kuei-ping; Chen Ching-yu; Ke Hsia-ai; Shen Chia-wen; Chu Yi-shan; Lin Chih-ying; Yang An-chi; Liu Hsuan; Lin Feng-chen; Su Yi-hsuan; Li Szu-shih; Chen Chia-yi	Softball	Women's tournament	17 August
Bronze	Liu Chang-min	Wushu	Men's nanquan / nangun combined	8 August
Bronze	Wu Wei Ting; Lin Sheng-ru; Chuang Ying-chieh; Chen Tzu-hsien; Chen Ie-en; Chou Chih-wei; Iya Lahok; Chien Cheng Yen; Lee Chun-lin; Yin Wan-ting	Dragon boat	Open 8-seater 200 metres	10 August
Bronze	Lin Ya-wen; Cho Ya-hui; Wu Pei-yun; Chen Cin; Chang Shu-chi; Lo Kai-yeh; Chan Ya-han; Chen Yuan-hao; Chang Chieh-sheng; Chiu Shao-en; Chen Chun-ta; Kao Chen-yu; Tsai Tsung-yu; Hsu Ching-chen	Korfball	Indoor tournament	12 August
Bronze	Zhang Huan Yi	Wushu	Men's 70 kg	12 August

Medals by sport
Sport	1st place, gold medalist(s)	2nd place, silver medalist(s)	3rd place, bronze medalist(s)	Total
Powerlifting	2	1	0	3
Korfball	1	0	1	2
Freestyle inline skating	1	0	0	1
Tug of war	1	0	0	1
Track speed skating	0	3	0	3
Finswimming	0	1	0	1
Softball	0	1	0	1
Wushu	0	0	2	2
Dragon boat	0	0	1	1
Total	5	6	4	15

== Competitors ==
The following is the list of number of competitors in the Games.

Sport	Men	Women	Total
Dancesport	1	0	1
Dragon boat	6	6	12
Finswimming	1	2	3
Freediving	1	0	1
Freestyle inline skating	4	3	7
Inline hockey	14	0	14
Ju-jitsu	0	1	1
Korfball	10	10	20
Orienteering	1	1	2
Pool	2	0	2
Powerlifting	5	3	8
Racquetball	1	1	2
Speed skating	2	2	4
Softball	0	15	15
Tug of war	11	11	22
Wakeboarding	2	1	3
Wushu	3	3	6
Total	63	58	121

== Dancesport ==
Dancer	Event	Group stage					Quarter-finals	Semi-finals	Finals / BM	Rank
Dancer	Event	Opponent score	Opponent score	Opponent score	Point	Rank	Opponent score	Opponent score	Opponent score	Rank
Sun Chen; Quake	B-boys									

== Dragon boat ==
Squad

- Chen Ie-en
- Chen Tzu-hsien
- Chien Cheng-yen
- Chou Chih-wei
- Chou Ching-ting ^{10s}
- Chuang Ying-chieh
- Iya Lahok
- Lee Chun-lin
- Lin Sheng-ru
- Liu Jen-yu ^{10s}
- Wu Wei-ting
- Yin Wan-ting

Summary

Team	Event	Heat		Semi-finals		Final	
Team	Event	Time	Rank	Time	Rank	Time	Rank
Chinese Taipei team	8s 200 m	48.73	3 SF	48.59	1 F	47.27	3rd place, bronze medalist(s)
Chinese Taipei team	8s 500 m	2:14.59	4 SF	2:29.99	6	Did not advance	10
Chinese Taipei team	8s 2000 m	—N/a				11:14.75	12
Chinese Taipei team	10s 200 m	50.12	3 SF	49.53	1 F	49.03	4
Chinese Taipei team	10s 500 m	2:10.55	3 SF	2:37.17	6	Did not advance	10
Chinese Taipei team	10s 2000 m	—N/a				9:29.04	7

== Freediving ==
Swimmer	Event	Time	Rank
Chang Kai-hsiang	Men's dynamic with fins	277.0	4
Chang Kai-hsiang	Men's dynamic without fins	DSQ	7

== Finswimming ==
Swimmer	Event	Time	Rank
Huang Mei-chien	Women's 50 metre bi-fins	21.33	2nd place, silver medalist(s)
Huang Mei-chien	Women's 100 metre bi-fins	48.01	4
He Pin-li	Women's 100 metre bi-fins	48.17	5

== Freestyle inline skating ==
=== Speed ===
Skater	Event	Qualification stage		Quarter-finals	Semi-finals	Final / BM	Rank
Skater	Event	Score	Rank	Opponent score	Opponent score	Opponent score	Rank
Wu Su Yu-en	Men						
Yang Kai-wei	Men						
Chen Pei-yi	Women						
Liu Chiao-hsi	Women						

=== Classic ===
Skater	Event	Final	Rank
Chen Chien-ting	Men		
Chou Po-wei	Men		
Chiu Yin-hsuan	Women		

== Inline hockey ==
Squads

Team head coach: Lin Hung-ju

- 3 Yang Ho-cheng ^{F}
- 7 Wang Tzu-wei ^{D}
- 9 Chao Yu-hsiang ^{C, D}
- 12 Wu Yu-chen ^{F}
- 14 Lai Pin-ru ^{D}
- 17 Lin Chih-han ^{D}
- 18 Kuo Cheng-yu ^{D}
- 20 Huang Sheng-chun ^{G}
- 22 Liu Chien-yu ^{F}
- 24 Lin Jui-yu ^{D}
- 29 Wu Bo-wei ^{F}
- 32 Lin Yi-kuan ^{F}
- 69 Chien Chun-hsien ^{F}
- 99 Chang Lai-yu ^{G}

Legends: C: Captain; D: Defender; F: Forward; G: Goalkeeper.

Summary

Team	Event	Group stage				Semi-final	Final / BM	
Team	Event	Opposition Score	Opposition Score	Opposition Score	Rank	Opposition Score	Opposition Score	Rank
Chinese Taipei men	Men's tournament	Namibia (NAM); L 3–4	United States (USA); L 1–4	China (CHN); W 4–1	3	5th to 8th Argentina (ARG); W 4–1	5th place Italy (ITA); L 1–2	6

== Ju-jitsu ==
Judoka	Event	Pool stage			Semi-finals	Final / BM	Rank
Judoka	Event	Opponent score	Opponent score	Rank	Opponent score	Opponent score	Rank
Wu Yu-ting	Women's 52 kg fighting	Singchalad (THA); L 0–50	Farnè (ITA); L 0–50	3	Did not advance		DSQ

== Korfball ==
Chinese Taipei qualified in korfball at the 2023 IKF World Korfball Championship.

=== Indoor ===
Squads

Head coach: Hsieh Fang-yi

Male:

- 11 Chen Yuan-hao
- 12 Chang Chieh-sheng
- 13 Chiu Shao-en
- 15 Chen Chun-ta
- 17 Kao Chen-yu
- 18 Tsai Tsung-yu
- 20 Hsu Ching-chen

Female:

- 1 Lin Ya-wen
- 3 Cho Ya-hui
- 4 Wu Pei-yun
- 5 Chen Cin
- 7 Chang Shu-chi
- 9 Lo Kai-yeh
- 10 Chan Ya-han

Result

Player	Event	Group stage				Semi-final	Final / BM	
Player	Event	Opposition Score	Opposition Score	Opposition Score	Rank	Opposition Score	Opposition Score	Rank
Chinese Taipei team	Indoor	China (CHN); W 28–14	Netherlands (NED); L 16–33	Portugal (POR); W 23–18	2	Belgium (BEL); L 13–19	Czech Republic (CZE); W 15–19	3rd place, bronze medalist(s)

=== Beach ===
Squads

Male:

- Onix Chang
- Rin Huang
- Jack Wang

Female:

- Juby Chu
- Cindy Wang
- Joy Wu

Result

Player	Event	Group stage				Quarter-finals	Semi-finals	Final / BM	
Player	Event	Opposition Score	Opposition Score	Opposition Score	Rank	Opposition Score	Opposition Score	Opposition Score	Rank
Chinese Taipei team	Beach	United States (USA) W 8–5	China (CHN) W 3–14	Hungary (HUN) W 7–4	1	Australia (AUS) W 15–11	Belgium (BEL) W 8–7	Netherlands (NED) W 6–8	1st place, gold medalist(s)

== Orienteering ==
Player	Event	Time	Rank
Lin Jo-shui	Women's sprint	29:50	39
Lin Jo-shui	Women's middle distance	1:37:53	35

== Pool ==
Player	Event	Group stage			Quarter-finals	Semi-finals	Finals / BM	Rank
Player	Event	Opponent score	Opponent score	Rank	Opponent score	Opponent score	Opponent score	Rank
Wu Kun-lin	Men's pool	Szolnoki (HUN); L 8–9	de Luna (PHI); W 9–5	2				
Hsieh Chia-chen	Men's pool	Filler (GER); L 5–9	Szewczyk (POL); L 5–9	3	Did not advance			11

== Powerlifting ==
Equipped

Powerlifter	Event	Squat	Bench press	Deadlift	Total	Point	Rank
Hsieh Tsung-ting	Men's lightweight	285.0	210.0	280.0	775.0	105.81	2nd place, silver medalist(s)
Lin Yi-chun	Men's lightweight	290.0	197.5	292.5	780.0	104.58	4
Chiang Kai-chieh	Men's middleweight	352.5	227.5	342.5	922.5	107.54	1st place, gold medalist(s)
Tien Chi-sen	Men's super heavyweight	DSQ					
Yang Sen	Men's super heavyweight	453.5 WR	332.5	332.5	1118.5	108.90	(gold) GR
Tseng Tzu-yin	Women's lightweight	185.0	115.0	170.0	470.0	96.70	5
Huang Yen-tzu	Women's middleweight	210.0	150.0	205.0	565.0	108.86	4 WR
Hung Hsiu-ching	Women's middleweight	232.5	112.5	215.0	560.0	102.07	7

== Racquetball ==
Athlete	Event	Round of 16	Quarter-final	Semi-final	Final / BM	
Athlete	Event	Opposition Result	Opposition Result	Opposition Result	Opposition Result	Rank
Huang Han-yang	Men's singles					
Wang Yuan	Women's singles					
Huang Han-yang; Wang Yuan	Mixed doubles					

== Softball ==
=== Women ===
Squad

- Chen Chia-yi
- Chen Ching-yu
- Chiang Ting-en
- Chu Yi-shan
- Ho Yi-fan
- Ke Hsia-ai
- Li Szu-shih
- Lin Chih-ying
- Lin Feng-chen
- Liu Hsuan
- Shen Chia-wen
- Su Yi-hsuan
- Tu Ya-ting
- Yang An-chi
- Yeh Kuei-ping

Results

Team	Event	Group play				Semi-final	Final / BM	
Team	Event	Opposition Result	Opposition Result	Opposition Result	Rank	Opposition Result	Opposition Result	Rank
Chinese Taipei women	Women's tournament	United States (USA) L 4–0	China (CHN) W 8–1	Netherlands (NED) W 0–2	2	Canada (CAN) W 6–4	United States (USA)L 5–0	2nd place, silver medalist(s)

== Track speed skating ==
=== Men ===
Skater	Event	Qualification		Semi-finals		Final	
Skater	Event	Time	Rank	Time	Rank	Time	Rank
Kuo Li-yang	200 m dual time trial			—N/a			
Kuo Li-yang	500 m sprint +D						
Chao Tsu-cheng	1,000 m sprint						
Kuo Li-yang	1,000 m sprint						
Chao Tsu-cheng	5,000 m point race	—N/a					
Chao Tsu-cheng	10,000 m elimination race	—N/a					

=== Women ===
Skater	Event	Qualification		Semi-finals		Final	
Skater	Event	Time	Rank	Time	Rank	Time	Rank
Liu Yi-hsuan	200 m dual time trial			—N/a			
Liu Yi-hsuan	500 m sprint +D						
Chang Yu-hsin	1,000 m sprint						
Liu Yi-hsuan	1,000 m sprint						
Chang Yu-hsin	5,000 m point race	—N/a					
Chang Yu-hsin	10,000 m elimination race	—N/a					

== Tug of war ==
Athlete	Event	Group stage						Semi-final	Final / BM	
Athlete	Event	Opposition Score	Opposition Score	Opposition Score	Opposition Score	Opposition Score	Rank	Opposition Score	Opposition Score	Rank
Chinese Taipei men: Chang Chih-hao; Chang Chun-wei; Ho Yu-yang; Hsu Ren-hong / Kuo Yen-ting; Lin Ching-chun; Wang Chih-hung; You Wei-xun	Men's outdoor 640 kg	Netherlands (NED); W 3–0	Switzerland (SUI); T 1–1	Belgium (BEL); L 0–3	Great Britain (GBR); L 0–3	Germany (GER); L 0–3	5	Did not advance	5th place Netherlands (NED); L 0–3	6
Chinese Taipei women: Chen Yue-ting; Hung Ning-hsuan; Ko Wen-lin; Lai Ting-yu / Lin Meng-zhu; Lu Yi-jia; Tien Chia-hsin; Tien Chia-jung	Women's outdoor 500 kg	Sweden (SWE); W 5–0	Great Britain (GBR); W 5–0	Switzerland (SUI); W 5–0	United States (USA); W 5–0	Germany (GER); W 5–0	1	Germany (GER); W 5–0	Switzerland (SUI); W 5–0	1st place, gold medalist(s)
Chinese Taipei mixed All men's and women's team above	Mixed outdoor 580 kg	Germany (GER); L 0–3	Italy (ITA); T 1–1	Netherlands (NED); T 1–1	Switzerland (SUI); L 0–3	Belgium (BEL); L 0–3	5	Did not advance	Netherlands (NED); W 2–1	5

== Wakeboarding ==
Wakeboarder	Event	Qualification		Last Chance Qualifier		Semi-finals		Final	
Wakeboarder	Event	Score	Time	Score	Time	Score	Time	Score	Time
Yang Shu-kai	Men's skim	50.83	1 SF	Bye		55.00	2 Q	55.33	5
Yang Yu-yeh	Men's freestyle	72.11	3 SF	Bye		44.56	4	Did not advance	
Riona Chen	Women's skim	30.00	4 LCQ	43.33	1 Q	30.00	4	Did not advance	

== Wushu ==
Chinese Taipei qualified two athletes at the 2023 World Wushu Championships.

=== Sanda ===
Athlete	Event	Quarter-finals	Semi-finals	Finals	Rank
Athlete	Event	Opponent score	Opponent score	Opponent score	Rank
Zhang Huan-yi	Men's sanda 70 kg	Adolfo (SWE); W WPD	Cheung (HKG); L 1–2	Bronze medal Piraliyev (AZE); 0–0	

=== Taolu ===
Athlete	Event	Apparatus 1	Apparatus 2	Total	Rank
Liu Chang-min	Men's nanquan / nangun	Nanquan; 9.740	Nangun; 9.690	19.430	3rd place, bronze medalist(s)
Sun Chia-hung	Men's taijiquan / taijijian	Taijiquan; 9.763	Taijijian; 9.710	19.473	4
Liu Pei-hsun	Women's taijiquan / taijijian	Taijiquan; 9.93	Taijijian; 9.663	19.056	6
