= Canoe marathon at the 2025 World Games – Women's K-1 short distance =

Women's K1 short distance at the 2025 World Games
- Venue: Xinglong Lake, Chengdu, China
- Date: 9 August
- Competitors: 20 from 20 nations

Medalists
1st place, gold medalist(s)		Melina Andersson	Sweden
2nd place, silver medalist(s)		Vanda Kiszli	Hungary
3rd place, bronze medalist(s)		Susanna Cicali	Italy

The women's K1 short distance competition in canoe marathon at the 2025 World Games took place on 9 August 2025 at Xinglong Lake in Chengdu, China.

A total of 20 athletes participated from 20 nations.

== Results ==
=== Heats ===
The fastest five athletes from each heat and the five next best times qualified for the final. Results were as follows:

Rank	Heat	Athlete	Nation	Time	Notes
1	2	Melina Andersson	Sweden	16:07.90	Q
2	1	Vanda Kiszli	Hungary	16:17.16	Q
3	2	Rebecca Mann	Australia	16:17.87	Q
4	1	Susanna Cicali	Italy	16:18.02	Q
5	1	Zhou Yuexin	China	16:21.72	Q
6	2	Caroline Heuser	Germany	16:28.49	Q
7	2	Eva Barrios	Spain	16:29.60	Q
8	1	Pernille Hostrup	Denmark	16:31.26	Q
9	1	Kristina Bedeč	Serbia	16:35.83	Q
10	2	Maria Rei	Portugal	16:36.46	Q
11	1	Melissa Johnson	Great Britain	16:36.77	q
12	2	Kateřina Mílová	Czech Republic	16:37.20	q
13	2	Emma Kemp	New Zealand	16:37.25	q
14	2	Kitty Schiphorst	Netherlands	16:40.50	q
15	2	Romana Švecová	Slovakia	16:40.53	q
16	1	Mathilde Forest	France	17:18.97	
17	2	Saskia Hockly	South Africa	17:28.48	
18	1	Cecilia Collueque	Argentina	17:36.85	
19	1	Anette Baum	Estonia	17:38.22	
20	1	Honami Tohda	Japan	19:37.73	

=== Final ===
Results were as follows:

Rank	Athlete	Nation	Time	Notes
1st place, gold medalist(s)	Melina Andersson	Sweden	15:20.64	
2nd place, silver medalist(s)	Vanda Kiszli	Hungary	15:36.86	
3rd place, bronze medalist(s)	Susanna Cicali	Italy	15:43.79	
4	Pernille Hostrup	Denmark	16:05.49	
5	Eva Barrios	Spain	16:06.01	
6	Maria Rei	Portugal	16:07.97	
7	Kateřina Mílová	Czech Republic	16:08.57	
8	Rebecca Mann	Australia	16:12.40	
9	Emma Kemp	New Zealand	16:20.01	
10	Romana Švecová	Slovakia	16:21.27	
11	Caroline Heuser	Germany	16:24.34	
12	Kitty Schiphorst	Netherlands	16:28.91	
13	Melissa Johnson	Great Britain	16:46.89	
14	Kristina Bedeč	Serbia	17:10.11	
	Zhou Yuexin	China	DNF	
