= Duathlon at the 2025 World Games – Mixed relay =

Mixed relay at the 2025 World Games
- Venue: Xinglong Lake, Chengdu, China
- Date: 17 August
- Competitors: 38 from 11 nations
- Winning time: 1:19:21

Medalists
1st place, gold medalist(s)		María Varo; Javier Martín Morales	Spain
2nd place, silver medalist(s)		Aline Kootstra; Valentin van Wersch	Netherlands
3rd place, bronze medalist(s)		Jeanne Dupont; Arnaud Dely	Belgium

The mixed relay competition at the Duathlon at the 2025 World Games took place on 17 August at the Xinglong Lake in Chengdu, China.

== Competition format ==
A total of nineteenth teams from eleven different nations participated in the race. 2 teams per nations are ranked in the results. Teams BEL III, IRI III and PHI III are listed as not classified.

== Results ==
The results were a follows:

Rank	Athlete	Nation	Time
1st place, gold medalist(s)	María Varo; Javier Martín Morales	Spain (Spain I)	1:19:21
2nd place, silver medalist(s)	Aline Kootstra; Valentin van Wersch	Netherlands (Netherlands I)	1:19:24
3rd place, bronze medalist(s)	Jeanne Dupont; Arnaud Dely	Belgium (Belgium I)	1:19:24
4	Anahí Álvarez; David Nuñez Gomez	Mexico (Mexico I)	1:19:25
5	Lisa Isebaert; Vincent Bierinckx	Belgium (Belgium II)	1:20:19
6	Selene Martinez; Eduardo Nuñez Gomez	Mexico (Mexico II)	1:20:33
7	Diana Castillo; Brian Moya	Colombia (Colombia I)	1:20:35
8	Nelly Rassmann; Fabian Holbach	Germany (Germany I)	1:21:59
9	Lu Ziqing; Duan Zhengyu	China (China I)	1:23:05
10	Nikola Čorbová; Ondrej Kubo	Slovakia (Slovakia I)	1:23:05
11	Kim Mangrobang; Franklin Yee	Philippines (Philippines I)	1:23:54
12	Narumi Kanke; Reo Ishizeki	Japan (Japan II)	1:24:18
13	Yayoi Fukushima; Fumiya Tanaka	Japan (Japan I)	1:25:24
14	Merry Joy Trupa; John Patrick Ciron	Philippines (Philippines II)	1:25:59
15	Hadis Nasr Azadani; Meysam Rezaei Layeh	Iran (Iran II)	1:26:52
16	Faezeh Sadat Abedini Nezhad; Abbas Kiani Falavarjani	Iran (Iran I)	1:28:26
	Eléonore Hiller; Thibaut De Smet	Belgium (Belgium III)	1:22:48
	Shokouh Tayyareh Khajouie; Seyedjavad Hosseini	Iran (Iran III)	1:33:00
	Bea Marie Quiambao; Maynard Pecson	Philippines (Philippines III)	1:33:26
