= Fistball at the 2025 World Games – Women's tournament =

Women's fistball at the 2025 World Games
- Venue: Tianfu Park
- Location: Chengdu, China
- Dates: 9–13 August
- Teams: 8

Medalists
gold medal	Brazil
silver medal	Switzerland
bronze medal	Germany

The women's fistball tournament at the 2025 World Games was held from 9 to 13 August at the Tianfu Park in Chengdu, China.

== Group stage ==
All times are local (GMT+8).

=== Group A ===
Pos	Team	Pld	W	L	SF	SA	SD	Pts	Qualification
1	Brazil	3	3	0	9	4	+5	6	Semifinals
2	Switzerland	3	2	1	8	6	+2	4	Semifinals
3	Germany	3	1	2	6	6	0	2	Quarterfinals
4	Austria	3	0	3	2	9	−7	0	Quarterfinals

Source: Chengdu 2025

9 August 2025; 10:30	Brazil	3–2	Switzerland	Tianfu Park, Field 1
9 August 2025; 10:30	(7–11, 4–11, 11–7, 11–9, 11–4); Results			Tianfu Park, Field 1

9 August 2025; 15:30	Germany	3–0	Austria	Tianfu Park, Field 2
9 August 2025; 15:30	(11–8, 11–6, 11–6); Results			Tianfu Park, Field 2

9 August 2025; 17:30	Brazil	3–1	Austria	Tianfu Park, Field 1
9 August 2025; 17:30	(11–6, 11–4, 9–11, 11–4); Results			Tianfu Park, Field 1

9 August 2025; 17:30	Germany	2–3	Switzerland	Tianfu Park, Field 2
9 August 2025; 17:30	(11–6, 8–11, 7–11, 11–7, 11–13); Results			Tianfu Park, Field 2

11 August 2025; 14:30	Switzerland	3–1	Austria	Tianfu Park, Field 2
11 August 2025; 14:30	(11–7, 9–11, 11–8, 11–7); Results			Tianfu Park, Field 2

11 August 2025; 14:30	Brazil	3–1	Germany	Tianfu Park, Field 1
11 August 2025; 14:30	(12–10, 7–11, 11–6, 11–8); Results			Tianfu Park, Field 1

=== Group B ===
Pos	Team	Pld	W	L	SF	SA	SD	Pts	Qualification
1	Chile	3	2	1	8	3	+5	4	Quarterfinals
2	New Zealand	3	2	1	8	5	+3	4	Quarterfinals
3	Argentina	3	2	1	6	5	+1	4	5–8th place semifinals
4	United States	3	0	3	0	9	−9	0	5–8th place semifinals

Source: Chengdu 2025

9 August 2025; 09:00	Chile	2–3	New Zealand	Tianfu Park, Field 1
9 August 2025; 09:00	(9–11, 11–8, 11–13, 11–9, 10–12); Results			Tianfu Park, Field 1

9 August 2025; 09:00	Argentina	3–0	United States	Tianfu Park, Field 2
9 August 2025; 09:00	(11–7, 14–12, 11–5); Results			Tianfu Park, Field 2

9 August 2025; 16:00	Chile	3–2	United States	Tianfu Park, Field 1
9 August 2025; 16:00	(11–7, 11–2, 14–12); Results			Tianfu Park, Field 1

9 August 2025; 12:00	Argentina	3–2	New Zealand	Tianfu Park, Field 2
9 August 2025; 12:00	(9–11, 11–6, 11–8, 10–12, 13–11); Results			Tianfu Park, Field 2

11 August 2022; 12:00	New Zealand	3–0	United States	Tianfu Park, Field 2
11 August 2022; 12:00	(11–9, 11–5, 11–8); Results			Tianfu Park, Field 2

11 August 2025; 12:00	Chile	3–0	Argentina	Tianfu Park, Field 1
11 August 2025; 12:00	(11–8, 11–8, 14–12); Results			Tianfu Park, Field 1

== Knockout stage ==
=== Bracket ===
Quarterfinals
12 August
Austria	3
Chile	2
12 August
Germany	3
New Zealand	0

Semifinals
12 August
Brazil	3
Austria	1
12 August
Switzerland	3
Germany	2

Gold medal
13 August
Brazil	3
Switzerland	2
Bronze medal
13 August
Austria	0
Germany	3

5–8th place semifinals
12 August
Chile	3
United States	1
12 August
New Zealand	3
Argentina	1

Fifth place game
13 August
Chile	3
New Zealand	0
Seventh place game
13 August
United States	1
Argentina	3

=== Quarterfinals ===
12 August 2025; 09:00	Austria	3–2	Chile	Tianfu Park, Field 1
12 August 2025; 09:00	(12–10, 9–11, 11–6, 7–11, 11–6); Report			Tianfu Park, Field 1

12 August 2025; 09:00	Germany	3–0	New Zealand	Tianfu Park, Field 2
12 August 2025; 09:00	(11–4, 11–5, 11–4); Report			Tianfu Park, Field 2

=== 5–8th place semifinals ===
12 August 2025; 13:00	Chile	3–1	United States	Tianfu Park, Field 2
12 August 2025; 13:00	(9–11, 11–9, 11–2, 11–6); Report			Tianfu Park, Field 2

12 August 2025; 14:30	New Zealand	3–1	Argentina	Tianfu Park, Field 2
12 August 2025; 14:30	(11–7, 12–10, 7–11, 15–13); Report			Tianfu Park, Field 2

=== Semifinals ===
12 August 2025; 13:00	Brazil	3–1	Austria	Tianfu Park, Field 1
12 August 2025; 13:00	(11–6, 14–15, 11–4, 11–7); Report			Tianfu Park, Field 1

12 August 2025; 14:30	Switzerland	3–2	Germany	Tianfu Park, Field 1
12 August 2025; 14:30	(8–11, 11–9, 9–11, 12–10, 12–10); Report			Tianfu Park, Field 1

=== Seventh place game ===
13 August 2025; 09:00	United States	1–3	Argentina	Tianfu Park, Field 2
13 August 2025; 09:00	(8–11, 11–5, 8–11, 4–11); Report			Tianfu Park, Field 2

=== Fifth place game ===
13 August 2025; 12:00	Chile	3–0	New Zealand	Tianfu Park, Field 2
13 August 2025; 12:00	(11–2, 11–7, 11–7); Report			Tianfu Park, Field 2

=== Bronze medal game ===
13 August 2025; 11:30	Austria	0–3	Germany	Tianfu Park, Field 1
13 August 2025; 11:30	(8–11, 5–11, 6–11); Report			Tianfu Park, Field 1

=== Gold medal game ===
13 August 2025; 15:30	Brazil	3–2	Switzerland	Tianfu Park, Field 1
13 August 2025; 15:30	(5–11, 5–11, 11–2, 14–12, 11–9); Report			Tianfu Park, Field 1

== Final standings ==
Rank	Team
1st place, gold medalist(s)	Brazil
2nd place, silver medalist(s)	Switzerland
3rd place, bronze medalist(s)	Germany
4	Austria
5	Chile
6	New Zealand
7	Argentina
8	United States
