= Netherlands at the 2025 World Games =

- IOC code: NED
- NOC: NOC*NSF

in Chengdu, China 7 August 2025 – 17 August 2025
- Competitors: 111 (36 men and 75 women) in 18 sports
- Medals Ranked 18th: Gold 4 Silver 5 Bronze 6 Total 15

World Games appearances
- 1981; 1985; 1989; 1993; 1997; 2001; 2005; 2009; 2013; 2017; 2022; 2025

The Netherlands competed at the 2025 World Games held in Chengdu, China from 7 to 17 August 2025. Athletes representing Netherlands won four gold medals, five silver medals and six bronze medals. The country finished in 18th place in the medal table.

== Medalists ==
| Medal | Name | Sport | Event | Date |
|---|---|---|---|---|
| Gold | Mike Schloesser | Archery | Men's individual compound | 9 August |
| Gold | Netherlands national korfball team: Jessica Lokhorst; Esther Cordus; Nikki Boerhout; Danielle Boadi; Fleur Hoek; Sabine Verhoef; Olav van Wijngaarden; Marije Visser; Ran Faber; Harjan Visscher; Carlo De Vries; Alwin Out; Julian Frieswijk; Bo Oppe | Korfball | Indoor tournament | 12 August |
| Gold | Therese Klompenhouwer | Billiard sports | Women's 3-cushion | 13 August |
| Gold | Valence Bickel | Kickboxing | Women's K1 60 kg | 14 August |
| Silver | Rikkert Veldhuizen; Jordy Mol | Trampoline gymnastics | Men's synchronized | 8 August |
| Silver | Ecco van der Veer | Ju-Jitsu | Men's fighting 62 kg | 12 August |
| Silver | Noa Man | Parkour | Women's speed | 12 August |
| Silver | Netherlands national korfball team: Mandy Koelman; Lynn Bijkerk; Jessie Heuveling; Jasper van Der Eijk; Ande Zwart; Jesper Tolsma | Beach Korfball | Beach Mixed Korfball | 17 August |
| Silver | Aline Kootstra; Valentin van Wersch | Duathlon | Mixed team relay | 17 August |
| Bronze | Sanne Meijer | Wakeboarding | Women's Cable Wakeboard | 10 August |
| Bronze | Boy Vogelzang | Ju-jitsu | Men's fighting -77 kg | 10 August |
| Bronze | Genevieve Bogers | Ju-jitsu | Women's fighting -57 kg | 11 August |
| Bronze | Willem Bakker | Archery | Men's individual recurve | 13 August |
| Bronze | Carvin Burke | Kickboxing | Men's point fighting 74 kg | 14 August |
| Bronze | Netherlands national women's canoe polo team: Selina Dijkstra; Wendy Huizinga; Thura Breedt; Lizzy van Duijn; Linda van As; Marieke van Hofslot; Alisha van Den Berg; Astrid van Der Maas | Canoe polo | Women's tournament | 16 August |

Medals by sport
| Sport | 1st place, gold medalist(s) | 2nd place, silver medalist(s) | 3rd place, bronze medalist(s) | Total |
| Korfball | 1 | 1 | 0 | 2 |
| Archery | 1 | 0 | 1 | 2 |
| Kickboxing | 1 | 0 | 1 | 2 |
| Billiard sports | 1 | 0 | 0 | 1 |
| Ju-jitsu | 0 | 1 | 2 | 3 |
| Duathlon | 0 | 1 | 0 | 1 |
| Parkour | 0 | 1 | 0 | 1 |
| Trampoline gymnastics | 0 | 1 | 0 | 1 |
| Canoe polo | 0 | 0 | 1 | 1 |
| Wakeboarding | 0 | 0 | 1 | 1 |
| Total | 4 | 5 | 6 | 15 |

== Competitors ==
The following is the list of number of competitors in the Games.

| Sport | Men | Women | Total |
|---|---|---|---|
| Archery | 2 | 1 | 3 |
| Beach handball | 0 | 10 | 10 |
| Billards | 1 | 2 | 3 |
| Canoe Sports | 2 | 10 | 12 |
| Dancesport | 0 | 1 | 1 |
| Duathlon | 1 | 1 | 2 |
| Gymnastics | 3 | 5 | 8 |
| Ju-jitsu | 2 | 1 | 3 |
| Karate | 1 | 0 | 1 |
| Kickboxing | 1 | 1 | 2 |
| Korfball | 10 | 10 | 20 |
| Lifesaving | 1 | 0 | 1 |
| Powerlifting | 0 | 1 | 1 |
| Sambo | 1 | 0 | 1 |
| Softball | 0 | 15 | 15 |
| Speed Skating | 0 | 5 | 5 |
| Tug of war | 11 | 11 | 22 |
| Wakeboarding | 0 | 1 | 1 |
| Total | 36 | 75 | 111 |

== Archery ==
Barebow/recurve

| Athlete | Event | Qualification | | Elimination 1 | Elimination 2 | Elimination 3 | Elimination 4 | Semifinal | Final / BM | |
| Athlete | Event | Score | Rank | Opposition Result | Opposition Result | Opposition Result | Opposition Result | Opposition Result | Opposition Result | Rank |
|---|---|---|---|---|---|---|---|---|---|---|
| Willem Bakker | Men's recurve | 369 | 3 | Bye | | | Cui (CHN); W 88–87 | Borsani (ITA); L 57–61 | Unruh (GER); W 60–59 | 3rd place, bronze medalist(s) |
| Gabriela Schloesser | Women's recurve | 349 | 6 | Bye | | Brug (CAN); L 78–82 | Did not advance | | | |

Target - Compound

| Athlete | Event | Qualification | | Round of 32 | Round of 16 | Quarterfinals | Semifinal | Final / BM | |
| Athlete | Event | Score | Rank | Opposition Result | Opposition Result | Opposition Result | Opposition Result | Opposition Result | Rank |
|---|---|---|---|---|---|---|---|---|---|
| Mike Schloesser | Men's Compound | 715 | 1 | Bye | Garcia Flores (MEX); W 147–145 | Yamrom (ISR); W 147–147 | Verma (IND); W 148–145 | Broadnax (USA); W 150–148 | 1st place, gold medalist(s) |

== Gymnastics ==
=== Parkour ===
Men

| Athlete | Event | Qualification | | Final | |
| Athlete | Event | Result | Rank | Result | Rank |
|---|---|---|---|---|---|
| Tangui van Schingen | Men's speed | 27.66 | 5 Q | 29.05 | 5 |
| Tangui van Schingen | Women's freestyle | 23.2 | 4 Q | 26.4 | 4 |

Women

| Athlete | Event | Qualification | | Final | |
| Athlete | Event | Result | Rank | Result | Rank |
|---|---|---|---|---|---|
| Noa Man | Women's speed | 39.53 | 2 Q | 37.67 | 2nd place, silver medalist(s) |
| Noa Man | Women's freestyle | 21.4 | 2 Q | 20.1 | 5 |

== Ju-jitsu ==
| Athlete | Event | Elimination round | | | Round of 16 | Quarterfinal | Semifinal | Final / BM | |
| Athlete | Event | Opposition Result | Opposition Result | Rank | Opposition Result | Opposition Result | Opposition Result | Opposition Result | Rank |
|---|---|---|---|---|---|---|---|---|---|
| Ecco Van der Veer | Men's ne-waza 62 kg | Jafari (DEN); W 0-50 | Jafari (COL); W 13-23 | 1 Q | Bye | | Kanatbek (KAZ); W 27-13 | Mochulskyi (UKR); L 17-12 | 2nd place, silver medalist(s) |
| Boy Vogelzang | Men's ne-waza 77 kg | Dominguez (URU); W 50-0 | Kunsa (FRA); W 50-0 | 1 Q | Bye | | Andersen (DEN); L 11-14 | Kunsa (FRA); W 50-0 | 3rd place, bronze medalist(s) |
| Genevieve Bogers | Women's ne-waza 57 kg | Bonnet (FRA); W 16-4 | Mattsson (SWE); W 18-9 | 1 Q | Bye | | Dahl (DEN); L 4-12 | Mattsson (SWE); W 13-4 | 3rd place, bronze medalist(s) |

== Karate ==
Men

| Athlete | Event | Elimination round | | | | Semifinal | Final / BM | |
| Athlete | Event | Opposition Result | Opposition Result | Opposition Result | Rank | Opposition Result | Opposition Result | Rank |
|---|---|---|---|---|---|---|---|---|
| Brian Timmermans | Men's kumite 84 kg | Jafari (JOR); L 2-9 | Kvesići (CRO); L 3-5 | Mastrogiannis (GRE); W 4-3 | 3 | Did not advance | | |

== Kickboxing ==
| Athlete | Event | Quarterfinal | Semifinal | Final / BM | |
| Athlete | Event | Opposition Result | Opposition Result | Opposition Result | Rank |
|---|---|---|---|---|---|
| Valenca Bickel | Women's K1 Style –60 kg | Mechraoui (ALG); W 3-0 | Martyniuk (UKR); W 3-0 | Cmárová (ALG); W 3-0 | 1st place, gold medalist(s) |
| Carvin Burke | Men's point-fighting –74 kg | Mirzaev (UZB); W 15-5 | Zimmermann (AUT); L 10-15 | Anastasopoulos (GRE); W 9-5 | 3rd place, bronze medalist(s) |

== Korfball ==
Indoor

The Netherlands qualified in korfball at the 2023 IKF World Korfball Championship.

| Athlete | Event | Group stage | | | | Semi-final | Final / BM | |
| Athlete | Event | Opposition Score | Opposition Score | Opposition Score | Rank | Opposition Score | Opposition Score | Rank |
|---|---|---|---|---|---|---|---|---|
| Team Netherlands | Korfball | Portugal; W 29-12 | Chinese Taipei; W 33-18 | China; W 35-9 | 1 Q | Czech Republic; W 35-13 | Belgium; W 23-26 | 1st place, gold medalist(s) |

Beach

The Netherlands qualified in beach korfball at the 2024 World Beach Korfball Championship.

| Athlete | Event | Group stage | | | | Quarterfinal | Semi-final | Final / BM | |
| Athlete | Event | Opposition Score | Opposition Score | Opposition Score | Rank | Opposition Score | Opposition Score | Opposition Score | Rank |
|---|---|---|---|---|---|---|---|---|---|
| Team Netherlands | Beach Korfball | Australia; W 18-0 | Belgium; W 11-4 | Poland; W 5-16 | 1 | United States; W 13–8 | Hungary; W 12-4 | Chinese Taipei; L 6-8 | 2nd place, silver medalist(s) |

== Powerlifting ==
Classic

| Athlete | Event | Exercises | | | Total weight | Total points | Rank |
| Athlete | Event | Squat | Bench press | Deadlift | Total weight | Total points | Rank |
|---|---|---|---|---|---|---|---|
| Pleun Dekkers | Women's Lightweight | 179.5 WR | 95.0 | 185.0 | 459.5 | 116.18 | 4 |

== Roller Sports ==
Road Speed Skating

| Athlete | Event | Final | |
| Athlete | Event | Result | Rank |
|---|---|---|---|
| Lianne van Loon | Women's 10,000 Point Race | 15:37.542 | 7 |
| Lianne van Loon | Women's 15,000 m elimination race | ELIM | 5 |

Track Speed Skating

| Athlete | Event | Final | |
| Athlete | Event | Result | Rank |
|---|---|---|---|
| Lianne van Loon | Women's 1,000 m sprint | 1:29.047 | 20 |
| Lianne van Loon | Women's 10,000m point elimination race | ELIM | 11 |

== Softball ==
Women

| Team | Event | Group play | | | | Semifinal | Final / BM | |
| Team | Event | Opposition Result | Opposition Result | Opposition Result | Rank | Opposition Result | Opposition Result | Rank |
|---|---|---|---|---|---|---|---|---|
| Netherlands women | Women's tournament | China; W 1–3 | United States; L 1–8 | Chinese Taipei; L 0–2 | 3 | 5th–8th Classification; Puerto Rico; L 1–3 | Seventh place play-off New Zealand; Cancelled | 7 |

== Tug of war ==
| Athlete | Event | Group stage | | | | | | Semi-final | Final / BM | |
| Athlete | Event | Opposition Score | Opposition Score | Opposition Score | Opposition Score | Opposition Score | Rank | Opposition Score | Opposition Score | Rank |
|---|---|---|---|---|---|---|---|---|---|---|
| Team Netherlands | Men's outdoor 640 kg | Chinese Taipei; L 3–0 | Germany; L 3–0 | Great Britain; D 1–1 | Switzerland; L 0–3 | Belgium; L 0–3 | 6 | —N/a | 5th place match Chinese Taipei; W 0–3 | 5 |
| Team Netherlands | Mixed outdoor 580 kg | Belgium; L 0–3 | Germany; L 0–3 | Chinese Taipei; D 1–1 | Italy; L 3–0 | Switzerland; L 3–0 | 6 | —N/a | 5th place match Chinese Taipei; L 2–1 | 6 |
