= Kickboxing at the 2025 World Games – Women's K1 style 60 kg =

Women's K1 style 60 kg at the 2025 World Games
- Venue: Sichuan Provincial Gymnasium
- Location: Chengdu, China
- Dates: 12–14 August 2025
- Competitors: 8 from 8 nations

Medalists
gold medal	Valence Bickel	Netherlands
silver medal	Lucia Cmárová	Slovakia
bronze medal	Alina Martyniuk	Ukraine

The women's K1 style 60 kg competition in kickboxing at the 2025 World Games will take place from 12 to 14 August 2025 at the Sichuan Provincial Gymnasium in Chengdu, China.

== Competition format ==
A total of 8 athletes entered the competition. They fought in the cup system.

== Results ==
Quarterfinals
Valence Bickel (NED)	3
Belkise Mechraoui (ALG)	0
Xu Tingting (CHN)	0
Alina Martyniuk (UKR)	3
Sofia Oliveira (POR)	1
Susanti Ndapataka (INA)	2
Jacqueline Oliveira de Paula (BRA)	1
Lucia Cmárová (SVK)	2

Semifinals
Valence Bickel (NED)	3
Alina Martyniuk (UKR)	0
Susanti Ndapataka (INA)	1
Lucia Cmárová (SVK)	2

Final
Valence Bickel (NED)	3
Lucia Cmárová (SVK)	0

Third place
Alina Martyniuk (UKR)	3
Susanti Ndapataka (INA)	0
