= Air sports at the 2025 World Games =

- Venue: Dong'an Lake Sports Park Athletics Field
- Dates: 14–16 August 2025
- No. of events: 1
- Competitors: 32 from 20 nations

The air sports competition at the 2025 World Games took place from 14 to 16 August 2025 at the Dong'an Lake Sports Park Athletics Field in Chengdu, China. The discipline only had a mixed drone racing event, dropping the parachuting event that also took place during the previous games.

== Track ==
The drone racing track was revealed in June 2025. The layout is designed after the head of a giant panda, endemic to the city of Chengdu and the province of Sichuan.

== Qualification ==
A total of 32 athletes qualified based on a ranking list compiled by the FAI, dependent on results from the 2024 World Drone Racing Championships, and the 2024 Drone Racing World Cup.

== Medal table ==
* Host nation (China)

Rank	Nation	Gold	Silver	Bronze	Total
1	Japan	1	0	0	1
2	Hong Kong	0	1	0	1
3	South Korea	0	0	1	1
Totals (3 entries)		1	1	1	3

== Events ==
=== Mixed ===
Event	Gold	Silver	Bronze
Drone racing	Yuki Hashimoto; Japan	Kwan Chun Yan; Hong Kong	Kim Min-jae; South Korea

== Participating nations ==
- Austria (1)
- Belgium (1)
- Bulgaria (2)
- China (4)
- Czech Republic (1)
- France (2)
- Germany (2)
- Hong Kong (1)
- Hungary (1)
- Japan (2)
- Latvia (2)
- Liechtenstein (1)
- Poland (1)
- Romania (1)
- Serbia (1)
- South Korea (3)
- Spain (1)
- Thailand (1)
- Turkey (1)
- United States (2)
