= Lani Spiessens =

Belgian athlete

Personal information
- Born: 2008 (age 17–18) Bruges, Belgium

Sport
- Sport: Trampolining

Lani Spiessens (born 2008) is a Belgian athlete who competes in trampoline gymnastics.

== Sporting career ==
Spiessens trains with Turnclub Olympia Oosterzele. She is from Maldegem. In 2023, Spiessens became Junior World Vice-Champion. In 2024, she became Youth European Champion in Portugal. She represented Belgium at the 2025 World Games. In 2026, she became a European Tumbling Champion.

== Awards ==
Trampoline Gymnastics World Championships
2025	Pamplona (Spain)	Bronze	Tumbling
2025	Pamplona (Spain)	Bronze	Tumbling Team
2026	Nanjing (China)	Silver	Tumbling Team
European Trampoline Championships
2026	Portimão (Portugal)	Gold	Tumbling
2026	Portimão (Portugal)	Silver	Tumbling Team
