= Chile at the 2025 World Games =

- IOC code: CHI
- NOC: Chilean Olympic Committee

in Chengdu, China 7 August 2025 – 17 August 2025
- Competitors: 30 (16 men and 14 women) in 8 sports and 25 events
- Medals Ranked 76th: Gold 0 Silver 0 Bronze 2 Total 2

World Games appearances
- 1981; 1985; 1989; 1993; 1997; 2001; 2005; 2009; 2013; 2017; 2022; 2025

Chile competed at the 2025 World Games held in Chengdu, China from 7 to 17 August 2025.

Athletes representing Chile won two bronze medals and the country finished in 76th place in the medal table.

== Medalists ==
Medal	Name	Sport	Event	Date
Bronze	Valentina Toro	Karate	Women's kumite 55 kg	8 August
Bronze	Catalina Lorca	Track speed skating	Women's sprint 500 metre + d	14 August

== Competitors ==
The following is the list of number of competitors in the Games.

Sport	Men	Women	Total
Billards	1	0	1
Dancesport	1	0	1
Fistball	10	10	20
Karate	0	1	1
Kickboxing	1	0	1
Powerlifting	1	0	1
Speed skating	2	2	4
Wakeboarding	0	1	1
Total	16	14	30

== Billiard sports ==
Athletes	Event	Round of 16	Quarterfinal	Semifinal	Final / BM
Athletes	Event	Opposition Score	Opposition Score	Opposition Score	Opposition Score
Alejandro Carvajal	Heyball				

== Dancesport ==
Athlete	Nickname	Event	Round robin				Quarterfinal	Semifinal	Final / BM	
Athlete	Nickname	Event	Opposition Result	Opposition Result	Opposition Result	Rank	Opposition Result	Opposition Result	Opposition Result	Rank
Matías Martínez	Matita	B-Boys								

== Fistball ==
Team	Event	Group Stage				Quarterfinal	Semifinal	Final / BM	
Team	Event	Opposition Score	Opposition Score	Opposition Score	Rank	Opposition Score	Opposition Score	Opposition Score	Rank
Chile men's	Men's tournament	Italy; W 3–2	New Zealand; W 3–1	Argentina; W 3–1	1	Switzerland; L 3–0	New Zealand; W 3–1	Italy; L 2–3	6
Chile women's	Women's tournament	New Zealand; L 2–3	United States; W 3–0	Argentina; W 3–0	2	Austria; L 3–2	United States; W 3–1	New Zealand; W 3–0	5

== Karate ==
Women

Athlete	Category	Group stage				Semi-finals	Final/Bronze medal bout	
Athlete	Category	Opposition Result	Opposition Result	Opposition Result	Rank	Opposition Result	Opposition Result	Rank
Valentina Toro	55 kg							

== Kickboxing ==
Men

Athlete	Category	Quarterfinals	Semi-finals	Final/Bronze medal bout	
Athlete	Category	Opposition Result	Opposition Result	Opposition Result	Rank
Kevin Cordova	63 kg				

== Powerlifting ==
Classic

Athlete	Event	Exercises			Total weight	Total points	Rank
Athlete	Event	Squat	Bench press	Deadlift	Total weight	Total points	Rank
Pablo Anderson	Men's middleweight	272.5	182.5	300.0	755.0	106.02	5

== Roller skating ==
=== Road ===
Athlete	Event	Heat		Quarterfinal		Semifinal		Final	
Athlete	Event	Time	Rank	Time	Rank	Time	Rank	Result	Rank
Hugo Ramirez	Men's 15,000 m elimination race								
Hugo Ramirez	Men's 10,000 m point race								
Ricardo Verdugo	Men's 1 lap								
Ricardo Verdugo	Men's 100 m sprint								
Javiera San Martin	Women's 15,000 m elimination race								
Javiera San Martin	Women's 10,000 m point race								
Catalina Lorca	Women's 1 lap								
Catalina Lorca	Women's 100 m sprint								

=== Track ===
Men

Athlete	Event	Qualification		Heat		Semifinal		Final	
Athlete	Event	Time	Rank	Time	Rank	Time	Rank	Result	Rank
Hugo Ramirez	10,000 m elimination race								
Hugo Ramirez	5,000 m points race								
Hugo Ramirez	1,000 m sprint								
Ricardo Verdugo	1,000 m sprint								
Ricardo Verdugo	200 m dual time trial								
Ricardo Verdugo	500 m sprint + distance								

Women

Athlete	Event	Qualification		Heat		Semifinal		Final	
Athlete	Event	Time	Rank	Time	Rank	Time	Rank	Result	Rank
Javiera San Martin	10,000 m elimination race								
Javiera San Martin	5,000 m points race								
Javiera San Martin	1,000 m sprint								
Catalina Lorca	1,000 m sprint								
Catalina Lorca	200 m dual time trial								
Catalina Lorca	500 m sprint + distance								

== Wakeboarding ==
Women

Athlete	Event	Qualification		Repechage		Semifinal		Final	
Athlete	Event	Result	Rank	Result	Rank	Result	Rank	Result	Rank
Ignacia Holscher	Wakeboard								
