= Inline hockey at the 2025 World Games =

- Venue: Chengdu Roller Sports Centre
- Dates: 7–11 August 2025
- No. of events: 1
- Competitors: 8 teams from 8 nations

The inline hockey competition at the 2025 World Games was held from 7 to 11 August 2025 at the Chengdu Roller Sports Centre in Chengdu, China.

== Qualification ==
A total of eight men's teams qualified:

Event	Location	Dates	Total places	Qualified NOCs
Men's team – 8 teams
Host nation	—N/a	—N/a	1	China
2024 World Skate Games	(Italy) Rome	11–14 September 2024	7	United States; Czech Republic; Italy; Namibia; Chinese Taipei; Argentina; Sweden

== Participating nations ==
- Argentina
- China
- Czech Republic
- France
- Italy
- Namibia
- Chinese Taipei
- United States

== Medalists ==
Event	Gold	Silver	Bronze
Men's tournament	United States: Patrick Pugliese; Nicholas DellaMorte; Scott Savage (C); Corey Hodge; Ryan Marker; Joseph DiMartino; Charles Roman Vaughan III; Kyle Mooney; Keith Johnson; Maxwell Halvorsen; Jose Anthony Cadiz Jr.; William Pascalli; Kevin Mooney	Czech Republic: Jakub Cik; Mikuláš Zbořil; Pavel Strýček (C); Jakub Bernad; Petr Školoud; Jan Andrýsek; Jiří Matoušek; Daniel Brabec; Patrik Šebek; Jan Vyoral; Mikuláš Skoupý; Marek Loskot; Jakub Novák; Lukáš Novák	Namibia: Arian Van Der Plas; Theodor Borstlap; Christiaan Coetzee (C); Anko Lucks; Abe Van Der Merwe; Alex Wirtz; Keanan Simpson; Williem Coetzee; Valerik Hilbert; Josua Shatipamba Zeferinu; Josef Zeferinu; Wim Van Der Plas; Sean Liechti; Amandus Mathias Rottcher

Source: TWG 2025

== Results ==
=== Preliminary round ===
==== Group A ====
Pos	Team	Pld	W	OTW	OTL	L	GF	GA	GD	Pts	Qualification
1	United States	3	3	0	0	0	31	2	+29	9	Semifinals
2	Namibia	3	2	0	0	1	9	13	−4	6	Semifinals
3	Chinese Taipei	3	1	0	0	2	8	9	−1	3	Consolation round
4	China (H)	3	0	0	0	3	5	29	−24	0	Consolation round

Source: TWG 2025
(H) Host

Date	Time	Score			Report
7 August	10:30	Namibia	4–3	Chinese Taipei	Report
7 August	12:00	United States	20–1	China	Report
8 August	12:00	China	3–5	Namibia	Report
8 August	19:00	Chinese Taipei	1–4	United States	Report
9 August	17:00	United States	7–0	Namibia	Report
9 August	19:00	Chinese Taipei	4–1	China	Report

==== Group B ====
Pos	Team	Pld	W	OTW	OTL	L	GF	GA	GD	Pts	Qualification
1	Czech Republic	3	3	0	0	0	12	3	+9	9	Semifinals
2	France	3	1	1	0	1	7	6	+1	5	Semifinals
3	Italy	3	1	0	0	2	14	7	+7	3	Consolation round
4	Argentina	3	0	0	1	2	1	18	−17	1	Consolation round

Source: TWG 2025

Date	Time	Score			Report
7 August	9:00	Czech Republic	2–1	France	Report
7 August	13:30	Italy	9–0	Argentina	Report
8 August	14:00	France	4–3	Italy	Report
8 August	17:00	Argentina	0–7	Czech Republic	Report
9 August	12:00	Czech Republic	3–2	Italy	Report
9 August	14:00	Argentina	1–1 (2OT 0–1)	France	Report

=== Consolation round ===
Consolation Semifinals
B3	Italy	7
A4	China	1
A3	Chinese Taipei	4
B4	Argentina	1

5th place game
B3	Italy	2
A3	Chinese Taipei	1
7th place game
A4	China	4
B4	Argentina	5

==== Semifinals ====
Date	Time	Score			Report
10 August	12:00	Italy	7–1	China	Report
10 August	14:00	Chinese Taipei	4–1	Argentina	Report

==== 7th place game ====
Date	Time	Score			Report
11 August	12:00	China	4–5	Argentina	Report

==== 5th place game ====
Date	Time	Score			Report
11 August	14:00	Italy	2–1	Chinese Taipei	Report

=== Final round ===
Semifinals
A1	United States	2
B2	France	1
B1	Czech Republic	3
A2	Namibia	1

Final
A1	United States	4
B1	Czech Republic	3
Bronze medal game
B2	France	2
A2	Namibia	3

==== Semifinals ====
Date	Time	Score			Report
10 August	17:00	Czech Republic	3–1	Namibia	Report
10 August	19:00	United States	2–1	France	Report

==== Bronze medal game ====
Date	Time	Score			Report
11 August	17:00	France	2–3	Namibia	Report

==== Final ====
Date	Time	Score			Report
11 August	19:00	United States	4–3	Czech Republic	Report

== Final standings ==
Rank	Team	Record	GF	GA	GD
1st place, gold medalist(s)	United States	5–0	37	6	+31
2nd place, silver medalist(s)	Czech Republic	4–1	18	8	+10
3rd place, bronze medalist(s)	Namibia	3–2	13	18	-5
4	France	2–3	10	11	-1
5	Italy	3–2	23	9	+14
6	Chinese Taipei	2–3	13	12	+1
7	Argentina	1–4	7	26	-19
8	China	0–5	10	41	-31

Source: TWG 2025
