= Lifesaving at the 2025 World Games – Men's 200 metres super lifesaver =

Men's 200 metres super lifesaver at the 2025 World Games
- Venue: Chengdu Sport University Sancha Lake Campus Natatorium, Chengdu, China
- Date: 8 August
- Competitors: 8 from 4 nations

Medalists
1st place, gold medalist(s)		Francesco Ippolito	Italy
2nd place, silver medalist(s)		Fabio Pezzotti	Italy
3rd place, bronze medalist(s)		Felix Hofmann	Germany

The men's 200 metres super lifesaver competition at the 2025 World Games took place on 8 August at the Chengdu Sport University Sancha Lake Campus Natatorium in Chengdu, China.

== Background ==
=== Competition format ===
A total of eight athletes from four nations qualified based on a qualifying time.

=== World Record ===
Record	Athlete (nation)	Time (s)	Location	Date
World record	Francesco Ippolito (ITA)	2:02.98	Piccione, Italy	25 May 2023

== Results ==
The results were a follows:

Rank	Lane	Athlete	Nation	Time	Note
1st place, gold medalist(s)	5	Francesco Ippolito	Italy	2:06.74	
2nd place, silver medalist(s)	7	Fabio Pezzotti	Italy	2:07.01	
3rd place, bronze medalist(s)	2	Felix Hofmann	Germany	2:08.66	
4	6	Callum Brennan	Australia	2:09.41	
5	4	Kevin Lasserre	France	2:09.94	
6	8	Martin Roques	France	2:12.15	
7	3	James Koch	Australia	2:13.21	
8	1	Max Tesch	Germany	2:13.36	
