= Wakeboarding at the 2025 World Games =

- Venue: Sancha Lake
- Dates: 7–17 August 2025
- No. of events: 6
- Competitors: 83 from 33 nations

The water skiing and wakeboarding competition at the 2025 World Games took place in August 2025 at the Sancha Lake in Chengdu, China.

== Participating nations ==
- Argentina (1)
- Australia (2)
- Austria (2)
- Belgium (1)
- Canada (2)
- Chile (1)
- China (7)
- Chinese Taipei (3)
- Colombia (1)
- Croatia (1)
- France (4)
- Germany (7)
- Great Britain (2)
- Hong Kong (4)
- Hungary (1)
- Individual Neutral Athletes (1)
- Iran (1)
- Israel (1)
- Italy (8)
- Japan (4)
- Kyrgyzstan (1)
- Latvia (1)
- Mexico (1)
- Netherlands (1)
- New Zealand (2)
- Philippines (2)
- Poland (2)
- Singapore (2)
- South Korea (4)
- Spain (2)
- Switzerland (1)
- Thailand (4)
- Ukraine (2)
- United States (5)

Source: TWG 2025

== Medal table ==
* Host nation (China)

Rank	Nation	Gold	Silver	Bronze	Total
1	Germany	1	1	1	3
2	China*	1	1	0	2
3	Australia	1	0	0	1
3	Canada	1	0	0	1
3	France	1	0	0	1
3	United States	1	0	0	1
7	Italy	0	2	0	2
8	Japan	0	1	0	1
8	Ukraine	0	1	0	1
10	South Korea	0	0	2	2
11	Argentina	0	0	1	1
11	Hong Kong	0	0	1	1
11	Netherlands	0	0	1	1
Totals (13 entries)		6	6	6	18

== Events ==
=== Men ===
Event	Gold	Silver	Bronze
Cable	Loic Deschaux; France	Max Milde; Germany	Florian Weiherer; Germany
Skim	Jett Lambert; United States	Zhuang Tiancai; China	Cheng Chun Hin; Hong Kong
Freestyle	Noah Bollard; Australia	Shota Tezuka; Japan	Kim Yun-seo; South Korea

=== Women ===
Event	Gold	Silver	Bronze
Cable	Julia Rick; Germany	Vanessa Tittarelli; Italy	Sanne Meijer; Netherlands
Skim	Bailey Rush; Canada	Sonya Sokolova; Ukraine	Moon Joo-hee; South Korea
Freestyle	Xu Lu; China	Alice Virag; Italy	Eugenia de Armas; Argentina

== Results ==
=== Men's cable ===
The results were as follows:

Rank	Name	Qualification		LCQ		Semifinals		Final	
Rank	Name	Result	Rank	Result	Rank	Result	Rank	Result	Rank
1	Loic Deschaux (FRA)	80.40	1	—N/a		89.80	1	95.00	1st place, gold medalist(s)
2	Max Milde (GER)	80.40	1	—N/a		86.60	2	92.80	2nd place, silver medalist(s)
3	Florian Weiherer (GER)	63.40	2	—N/a		77.20	3	65.00	3rd place, bronze medalist(s)
4	Raph Trinidad (PHI)	80.20	1	—N/a		70.80	3	56.60	4
5	Oliver Orban (HUN)	74.20	1	—N/a		73.00	2	54.00	5
6	Isaic Claudio (USA)	47.80	3	74.40	1	75.00	1	47.80	6
7	Colby Zebarth (USA)	68.80	2	—N/a		75.40	4	Did not advance	
8	Patryk Lojek (POL)	71.00	2	—N/a		69.20	4	Did not advance	
9	Riccardo de Tollis (ITA)	68.80	2	—N/a		49.40	5	Did not advance	
10	Peeranat Faktongyu (THA)	67.40	1	—N/a		36.20	6	Did not advance	
11	Haakon Aamodt (NOR)	46.80	3	53.80	2	30.00	5	Did not advance	
12	Marko Gacic (CRO)	42.40	2	—N/a		DNS		Did not advance	
13	Leo Gatti (ITA)	59.60	3	52.00	3	Did not advance			
14	Luo Hui (CHN)	40.00	3	33.80	4	Did not advance			
15	Zhang Wei (CHN)	25.00	3	20.00	5	Did not advance			

=== Men's skim ===
The results were as follows:

Rank	Name	Qualification		LCQ		Semifinals		Final	
Rank	Name	Result	Rank	Result	Rank	Result	Rank	Result	Rank
1	Jett Lambert (USA)	83.75	1	—N/a		83.33	1	85.00	1st place, gold medalist(s)
2	Zhuang Tiancai (CHN)	45.00	4	73.33	1	60.00	2	65.67	2nd place, silver medalist(s)
3	Cheng Chun Hin (HKG)	37.67	3	—N/a		50.00	3	59.00	3rd place, bronze medalist(s)
4	BM Jomboon (THA)	80.00	1	—N/a		78.75	1	57.00	4
5	Yang Shu-kai (TPE)	50.83	1	—N/a		55.00	2	55.33	5
6	Michael Kunz (SUI)	44.00	2	—N/a		53.33	3	50.00	6
7	Oliver Meech (SGP)	50.00	3	—N/a		46.67	4	Did not advance	
8	Yeung Wai Kwok (HKG)	60.00	2	—N/a		43.75	4	Did not advance	
9	Eric Ordoñez (PHI)	36.67	2	—N/a		40.00	5	Did not advance	
10	Chubaka Chuba (UKR)	30.00	3	—N/a		25.00	5	Did not advance	
11	Kim Min (KOR)	23.33	5	48.33	2	Did not advance			
12	Gianmarco Panaccione (ITA)	30.00	5	35.00	3	Did not advance			
13	Keiji Umemura (JPN)	26.58	4	30.50	4	Did not advance			
14	Meo Stirm (GER)	25.00	4	20.00	5	Did not advance			

=== Men's freestyle ===
The results were as follows:

Rank	Name	Qualification		LCQ		Semifinals		Final	
Rank	Name	Result	Rank	Result	Rank	Result	Rank	Result	Rank
1	Noah Bollard (AUS)	33.89	5	60.11	1	78.89	1	74.78	1st place, gold medalist(s)
2	Shota Tezuka (JPN)	80.67	1	—N/a		58.00	2	72.78	2nd place, silver medalist(s)
3	Kim Yun-seo (KOR)	72.56	2	—N/a		62.33	2	69.11	3rd place, bronze medalist(s)
4	Pablo Monroy (MEX)	72.22	2	—N/a		54.22	3	62.00	4
5	Maxime Cadoux (FRA)	73.89	1	—N/a		61.67	3	46.67	5
6	Massi Piffaretti (ITA)	74.33	1	—N/a		77.33	1	44.78	6
7	Jorge Rocha (COL)	70.78	2	—N/a		57.78	4	Did not advance	
8	Yang Yu-Yeh (TPE)	72.11	3	—N/a		44.56	4	Did not advance	
9	Joey Gurr (CAN)	68.33	3	—N/a		39.22	5	Did not advance	
10	Rob Linavskis (LAT)	44.11	3	—N/a		35.11	5	Did not advance	
11	Wanley Fendrich (GER)	30.56	4	57.22	2	Did not advance			
12	Zhang Wei (CHN)	39.78	4	54.78	3	Did not advance			
13	Yue Han (CHN)	30.11	5	42.78	4	Did not advance			
14	Logan Steans (NZL)	44.11	4	40.00	5	Did not advance			
15	Toni Lo (HKG)	32.56	5	29.89	6	Did not advance			

=== Women's cable ===
The results were as follows:

Rank	Name	Qualification		LCQ		Semifinals		Final	
Rank	Name	Result	Rank	Result	Rank	Result	Rank	Result	Rank
1	Julia Rick (GER)	76.40	1	—N/a		70.20	1	86.40	1st place, gold medalist(s)
2	Vanessa Tittarelli (ITA)	72.00	1	—N/a		57.60	2	78.40	2nd place, silver medalist(s)
3	Sanne Meijer (NED)	60.00	1	—N/a		64.40	1	73.80	3rd place, bronze medalist(s)
4	Liza Pruzhanskaia (ISR)	48.20	2	—N/a		52.60	3	72.00	4
5	Bhraebhim Pipatsawaddhi (THA)	52.40	1	—N/a		58.80	2	68.00	5
6	Julia Lupij (POL)	49.40	2	—N/a		56.60	3	34.00	6
7	Elena Bodi (ESP)	54.00	1	—N/a		54.40	4	Did not advance	
8	Mariella Flemme (AUT)	47.80	2	—N/a		49.80	4	Did not advance	
9	Juliet Boura (FRA)	45.40	3	45.00	2	40.80	5	Did not advance	
10	Ira Ryzhova (AIN)	57.40	2	—N/a		37.60	5	Did not advance	
11	Emely Jones (GER)	52.20	2	—N/a		34.80	6	Did not advance	
12	Soline Bourdon (FRA)	43.60	3	55.80	1	30.00	6	Did not advance	
13	Xiong Yinyin (CHN)	28.80	3	25.00	3	Did not advance			
14	Xu Lu (CHN)	35.00	3	DNS		Did not advance			

=== Women's skim ===
The results were as follows:

Rank	Name	Qualification		LCQ		Semifinals		Final	
Rank	Name	Result	Rank	Result	Rank	Result	Rank	Result	Rank
1	Bailey Rush (CAN)	81.50	1	—N/a		83.33	1	63.33	1st place, gold medalist(s)
2	Sonya Sokolova (UKR)	66.67	2	—N/a		39.00	3	50.00	2nd place, silver medalist(s)
3	Moon Joo-hee (KOR)	45.00	2	—N/a		43.33	1	43.00	3rd place, bronze medalist(s)
4	Kate Wu (HKG)	42.42	2	—N/a		45.00	3	39.33	4
5	Alina Binder (AUT)	45.00	1	—N/a		40.67	2	31.67	5
6	Anni Flynn (THA)	55.00	1	—N/a		63.33	2	23.83	6
7	Riona Chen (TPE)	30.00	4	43.33	1	30.00	4	Did not advance	
8	Yuka Kagawa (JPN)	30.00	3	—N/a		30.00	4	Did not advance	
9	Mengdie Li (CHN)	40.67	3	—N/a		25.00	5	Did not advance	
10	Tara Kriz (GER)	40.00	3	—N/a		20.00	5	Did not advance	
11	Connie Hong Li (SGP)	30.00	4	31.67	2	Did not advance			
12	Christine Bickley (GBR)	20.00	5	25.00	3	Did not advance			
13	Paola Miatello (ITA)	20.83	5	21.00	4	Did not advance			
14	Nicole Hudson (USA)	DNS		Did not advance					

=== Women's freestyle ===
The results were as follows:

Rank	Name	Qualification		LCQ		Semifinals		Final	
Rank	Name	Result	Rank	Result	Rank	Result	Rank	Result	Rank
1	Xu Lu (CHN)	46.56	1	—N/a		53.44	1	69.56	1st place, gold medalist(s)
2	Alice Virag (ITA)	49.00	2	—N/a		50.44	2	68.44	2nd place, silver medalist(s)
3	Eugenia de Armas (ARG)	65.89	1	—N/a		69.11	2	64.00	3rd place, bronze medalist(s)
4	Giulia Castelli (ITA)	45.00	3	—N/a		72.78	1	62.11	4
5	Mackenzie McCarthy (AUS)	51.89	1	—N/a		68.33	3	57.67	5
6	Yun Hee-hyun (KOR)	33.33	4	63.11	1	50.00	3	53.00	6
7	Hinata Yoshihara (JPN)	32.67	2	—N/a		64.89	4	Did not advance	
8	Luna Cassart (BEL)	48.67	3	—N/a		59.78	5	Did not advance	
9	Sanne Meijer (NED)	32.11	3	—N/a		37.56	4	Did not advance	
10	Noah Tamaral (ESP)	48.00	2	—N/a		32.78	5	Did not advance	
11	Kitt Smith (USA)	31.44	5	60.22	2	Did not advance			
12	Nacha Holscher (CHI)	43.56	4	59.78	3	Did not advance			
13	Charlotte Millward (GBR)	23.11	5	41.67	4	Did not advance			
14	Morgan Haakma (NZL)	28.89	5	39.33	5	Did not advance			
15	Xiong Yinyin (CHN)	28.89	4	30.33	6	Did not advance			
