= Lifesaving at the 2025 World Games – Women's 100 metres rescue medley =

Women's 100 metres rescue medley at the 2025 World Games
- Venue: Chengdu Sport University Sancha Lake Campus Natatorium, Chengdu, China
- Date: 8 August
- Competitors: 8 from 4 nations

Medalists
1st place, gold medalist(s)		Nina Holt	Germany
2nd place, silver medalist(s)		Lena Oppermann	Germany
3rd place, bronze medalist(s)		Helene Giovanelli	Italy

The women's 100 metres rescue medley competition at the 2025 World Games took place on 8 August at the Chengdu Sport University Sancha Lake Campus Natatorium in Chengdu, China.

== Background ==
=== Competition format ===
A total of eight athletes from four nations qualified based on a qualifying time.

=== World Record ===
Record	Athlete (nation)	Time (s)	Location	Date
World record	Nina Holt (GER)	1:05.75	Southport, Great Britain	29 August 2024

== Results ==
The results were a follows:

Rank	Lane	Athlete	Nation	Time	Note
1st place, gold medalist(s)	4	Nina Holt	Germany	1:03.69	WR
2nd place, silver medalist(s)	6	Lena Oppermann	Germany	1:08.69	
3rd place, bronze medalist(s)	5	Helene Giovanelli	Italy	1:09.18	
4	2	Mariah Jones	Australia	1:12.48	
5	8	Chelsea Jones	Australia	1:12.68	
6	7	Romane Boudes	France	1:13.17	
7	3	Anna Pirovano	Italy	1:13.21	
8	1	Margaux Fabre	France	1:15.72	
