= Fistball at the 2025 World Games – Men's tournament =

Men's fistball at the 2025 World Games
- Venue: Tianfu Park
- Location: Chengdu, China
- Dates: 9–13 August
- Teams: 8

Medalists
gold medal	Brazil
silver medal	Germany
bronze medal	Austria

The men's fistball tournament at the 2025 World Games was held from 9 to 13 August at the Tianfu Park in Chengdu, China.

== Group stage ==
All times are local (GMT+8).

=== Group A ===
Pos	Team	Pld	W	L	SF	SA	SD	Pts	Qualification
1	Brazil	3	3	0	9	1	+8	6	Semifinals
2	Germany	3	2	1	7	4	+3	4	Semifinals
3	Austria	3	1	2	4	6	−2	2	Quarterfinals
4	Switzerland	3	0	3	0	9	−9	0	Quarterfinals

Source: Chengdu 2025

9 August 2025; 14:30	Germany	1–3	Brazil	Tianfu Park, Field 1
9 August 2025; 14:30	(7–11, 3–11, 11–6, 2–11); Results			Tianfu Park, Field 1

9 August 2025; 15:30	Austria	3–0	Switzerland	Tianfu Park, Field 2
9 August 2025; 15:30	(11–8, 11–8, 12–10); Results			Tianfu Park, Field 2

11 August 2025; 10:30	Germany	3–0	Switzerland	Tianfu Park, Field 1
11 August 2025; 10:30	(11–7, 11–6, 11–8); Results			Tianfu Park, Field 1

11 August 2025; 10:30	Austria	0–3	Brazil	Tianfu Park, Field 2
11 August 2025; 10:30	(9–11, 6–11, 14–16); Results			Tianfu Park, Field 2

11 August 2025; 17:30	Germany	3–1	Austria	Tianfu Park, Field 1
11 August 2025; 17:30	(12–10, 8–11, 11–6, 11–8)			Tianfu Park, Field 1

11 August 2025; 17:30	Brazil	3–0	Switzerland	Tianfu Park, Field 2
11 August 2025; 17:30	(11–7, 11–8, 11–9); Results			Tianfu Park, Field 2

=== Group B ===
Pos	Team	Pld	W	L	SF	SA	SD	Pts	Qualification
1	Chile	3	3	0	9	4	+5	6	Quarterfinals
2	Italy	3	2	1	8	4	+4	4	Quarterfinals
3	Argentina	3	1	2	5	6	−1	2	5–8th place semifinals
4	New Zealand	3	0	3	1	9	−8	0	5–8th place semifinals

Source: Chengdu 2025

9 August 2025; 12:00	Chile	3–2	Italy	Tianfu Park, Field 1
9 August 2025; 12:00	(11–13, 11–7, 5–11, 11–3, 13–11); Results			Tianfu Park, Field 1

9 August 2025; 12:00	Argentina	3–0	New Zealand	Tianfu Park, Field 2
9 August 2025; 12:00	(11–4, 15–13, 11–9); Results			Tianfu Park, Field 2

11 August 2025; 09:00	Chile	3–1	New Zealand	Tianfu Park, Field 1
11 August 2025; 09:00	(11–8, 9–11, 11–8, 15–13); Results			Tianfu Park, Field 1

11 August 2025; 09:00	Argentina	1–3	Italy	Tianfu Park, Field 2
11 August 2025; 09:00	(9–11, 11–9, 9–11, 5–11); Results			Tianfu Park, Field 2

11 August 2022; 16:00	Chile	3–0	Argentina	Tianfu Park, Field 1
11 August 2022; 16:00	(11–8, 11–8, 14–12); Results			Tianfu Park, Field 1

11 August 2025; 16:00	Italy	3–0	New Zealand	Tianfu Park, Field 2
11 August 2025; 16:00	(11–5, 11–9, 11–8); Results			Tianfu Park, Field 2

== Knockout stage ==
=== Bracket ===
Quarterfinals
12 August
Switzerland	3
Chile	0
12 August
Austria	3
Italy	0

Semifinals
12 August
Brazil	3
Switzerland	0
12 August
Germany	3
Austria	1

Gold medal game
13 August
Brazil	3
Germany	0
Bronze medal game
13 August
Switzerland	1
Austria	3

5–8th place semifinals
12 August
Chile	2
New Zealand	1
12 August
Italy	3
Argentina	0

Fifth place game
13 August
Chile	2
Italy	3
Seventh place game
13 August
New Zealand	1
Argentina	3

=== Quarterfinals ===
12 August 2025; 10:30	Switzerland	3–0	Chile	Tianfu Park, Field 1
12 August 2025; 10:30	(11–9, 11–6, 15–14); Report			Tianfu Park, Field 1

12 August 2025; 10:30	Austria	3–0	Italy	Tianfu Park, Field 2
12 August 2025; 10:30	(11–7, 13–11, 11–6); Report			Tianfu Park, Field 2

=== 5–8th place semifinals ===
12 August 2025; 16:00	Chile	3–1	New Zealand	Tianfu Park, Field 2
12 August 2025; 16:00	(12–10, 7–11, 11–7, 11–6); Report			Tianfu Park, Field 2

12 August 2025; 17:30	Italy	3–0	Argentina	Tianfu Park, Field 2
12 August 2025; 17:30	(11–7, 11–3, 11–9); Report			Tianfu Park, Field 2

=== Semifinals ===
12 August 2025; 16:00	Brazil	3–0	Switzerland	Tianfu Park, Field 1
12 August 2025; 16:00	(13–11, 15–14, 11–6); Report			Tianfu Park, Field 1

12 August 2025; 17:30	Germany	3–1	Austria	Tianfu Park, Field 1
12 August 2025; 17:30	(11–7, 7–11, 15–13, 11–9); Report			Tianfu Park, Field 1

=== Seventh place game ===
13 August 2025; 10:30	New Zealand	1–3	Argentina	Tianfu Park, Field 2
13 August 2025; 10:30	(8–11, 14–12, 6–11, 3–11); Report			Tianfu Park, Field 2

=== Fifth place game ===
13 August 2025; 13:30	Chile	2–3	Italy	Tianfu Park, Field 2
13 August 2025; 13:30	(11–8, 10–12, 9–11, 11–3, 4–11); Report			Tianfu Park, Field 2

=== Bronze medal game ===
13 August 2025; 13:00	Switzerland	1–3	Austria	Tianfu Park, Field 1
13 August 2025; 13:00	(8–11, 12–10, 7–11, 7–11); Report			Tianfu Park, Field 1

=== Gold medal game ===
13 August 2025; 17:00	Brazil	3–0	Germany	Tianfu Park, Field 1
13 August 2025; 17:00	(11–9, 11–5, 11–5); Report			Tianfu Park, Field 1

== Final standings ==
Rank	Team
1st place, gold medalist(s)	Brazil
2nd place, silver medalist(s)	Germany
3rd place, bronze medalist(s)	Austria
4	Switzerland
5	Italy
6	Chile
7	Argentina
8	New Zealand
