= Parkour at the 2025 World Games – Men's freestyle =

Men's freestyle at the 2025 World Games
- Venue: Xinglong Lake, Chengdu, China
- Date: 12 August
- Competitors: 8 from 8 nations

Medalists
1st place, gold medalist(s)		Mutsuhiro Shiohata	Japan
2nd place, silver medalist(s)		Eloan Hitz	France
3rd place, bronze medalist(s)		Shea Rudolph	United States

The men's freestyle competition in parkour at the 2025 World Games took place on 12 August 2025 at Xinglong Lake in Chengdu, China.

A total of eight athletes participated from eight nations.

== Competition format ==
Eight athletes with the highest score in the qualifications advanced to the final.

== Results ==
=== Qualification ===
The results were as follows;

Rank	Athlete	Nation	Difficulty	Execution	Total score
1	Mutsuhiro Shiohata	Japan	14.8	12.7	27.5
2	Tobias Kahofer	Austria	15.6	10.4	26.0
3	Shea Rudolph	United States	11.7	13.5	25.2
4	Tangui Van Schingen	Netherlands	9.0	14.2	23.2
5	Eloan Hitz	France	11.6	10.2	21.8
6	Caryl Cordt-Moeller	Switzerland	7.2	14.0	21.2
7	Fu Sida	China	7.6	5.0	12.6
8	Jaroslav Chum	Czech Republic	DNS		

=== Final ===
The results were as follows;

Rank	Athlete	Nation	Difficulty	Execution	Total score
1st place, gold medalist(s)	Mutsuhiro Shiohata	Japan	16.0	12.8	28.8
2nd place, silver medalist(s)	Eloan Hitz	France	16.9	10.2	27.1
3rd place, bronze medalist(s)	Shea Rudolph	United States	12.6	14.1	26.7
4	Tangui Van Schingen	Netherlands	13.3	13.1	26.4
5	Fu Sida	China	10.2	7.2	17.4
6	Caryl Cordt-Moeller	Switzerland	8.1	9.0	17.1
7	Tobias Kahofer	Austria	10.2	4.3	14.5
