= Parkour at the 2025 World Games – Men's speed =

Men's speed at the 2025 World Games
- Venue: Xinglong Lake, Chengdu, China
- Date: 13 August
- Competitors: 9 from 9 nations

Medalists
1st place, gold medalist(s)		Caryl Cordt-Moeller	Switzerland
2nd place, silver medalist(s)		Jaroslav Chum	Czech Republic
3rd place, bronze medalist(s)		Andrea Consolini	Italy

The men's speed competition in parkour at the 2025 World Games took place on 13 August 2025 at Xinglong Lake in Chengdu, China.

A total of nine athletes participated from nine nations.

== Competition format ==
The fastest six athletes in the qualifications advanced to the final.

== Results ==
=== Qualification ===
The results were as follows;

Rank	Athlete	Nation	Time	Notes
1	Jaroslav Chum	Czech Republic	26.27	Q
2	Carlos Pena	Colombia	26.33	Q
3	Caryl Cordt-Moeller	Switzerland	27.42	Q
4	Andrea Consolini	Italy	27.47	Q
5	Tangui Van Schingen	Netherlands	27.66	Q
6	Esteban Malaga	Slovakia	27.79	Q
7	Andres Fierro	Mexico	28.37	
8	Tobias Kahofer	Austria	32.61	
9	Eloan Hitz	France	DNS	

=== Final ===
The results were as follows;

Rank	Athlete	Nation	Time
1st place, gold medalist(s)	Caryl Cordt-Moeller	Switzerland	25.30
2nd place, silver medalist(s)	Jaroslav Chum	Czech Republic	25.83
3rd place, bronze medalist(s)	Andrea Consolini	Italy	27.27
4	Carlos Pena	Colombia	27.30
5	Esteban Malaga	Slovakia	27.82
6	Tangui Van Schingen	Netherlands	29.05
