= Karate at the 2025 World Games – Women's kumite 55 kg =

Women's kumite 55 kg at the 2025 World Games
- Venue: Jianyang Cultural and Sports Centre Gymnasium
- Location: Chengdu, China
- Dates: 8 August
- Competitors: 7 from 7 nations

Medalists
gold medal	Mia Bitsch	Germany
silver medal	Anzhelika Terliuga	Ukraine
bronze medal	Valentina Toro	Chile

The women's kumite 55 kg competition in karate at the 2025 World Games took place on 8 August 2025 at the Jianyang Cultural and Sports Centre Gymnasium in Chengdu, China.

== Results ==
=== Pool round ===
==== Pool A ====
Pos	Athlete	B	W	D	D^{0}	L	Pts	Score	(China)	(Germany)	(Japan)	(Canada)
1	Wei Yuchun (CHN)	3	3	0	0	0	9	19–5	—	9–4	8–0	2–1
2	Mia Bitsch (GER)	3	2	0	0	1	6	21–16	4–9	—	12–5	5–2
3	Rina Kodo (JPN)	3	1	0	0	2	3	10–22	0–8	5–12	—	5–2
4	Hana Furumoto-Deshaies (CAN)	3	0	0	0	3	0	5–12	1–2	2–5	2–5	—

Source: Chengdu 2025

==== Pool B ====
Pos	Athlete	B	W	D	D^{0}	L	Pts	Score	(Chile)	(Ukraine)	(Turkey)
1	Valentina Toro (CHI)	2	1	0	0	1	3 (Note: Toro (CHI) 1–1, Terliuga (UKR) 1–1, Yakan (TUR) 1–1. Scores obtained: Toro 7, Terliuga 4, Yakan 4. Terliuga 4–0 Yakan.)	7–4	—	5–0	2–4
2	Anzhelika Terliuga (UKR)	2	1	0	0	1	3	4–5	0–5	—	4–0
3	Tuba Yakan (TUR)	2	1	0	0	1	3	4–6	4–2	0–4	—

Source: Chengdu 2025

=== Finals ===
Semi-finals
Anzhelika Terliuga (UKR)	4
Wei Yuchun (CHN)	3
Mia Bitsch (GER)	7
Valentina Toro (CHI)	3

Gold medal bout
Anzhelika Terliuga (UKR)	1
Mia Bitsch (GER)	3
Bronze medal bout
Wei Yuchun (CHN)	0
Valentina Toro (CHI)	1
