= Canoe polo at the 2025 World Games =

- Venue: Jianyang Cultural and Sports Centre
- Dates: 13–16 August 2025
- No. of events: 2
- Competitors: 16 teams from 11 nations

The canoe polo competition at the 2025 World Games is scheduled to take place from 13 to 16 August 2025, in Chengdu in China, at the Jianyang Cultural and Sports Centre. The competition will have two team events.

== Qualification ==
A total of 16 teams (one male and one female) qualified based on their performance at the 2024 ICF Canoe Polo World Championships.

== Participating nations ==
- China (2)
- Denmark (2)
- France (1)
- Germany (2)
- Great Britain (1)
- Iran (1)
- Italy (2)
- Netherlands (1)
- New Zealand (1)
- Portugal (1)
- Spain (2)

== Medal table ==
* Host nation (China)

Rank	Nation	Gold	Silver	Bronze	Total
1	Germany	2	0	0	2
2	Italy	0	1	0	1
2	New Zealand	0	1	0	1
4	Great Britain	0	0	1	1
4	Netherlands	0	0	1	1
Totals (5 entries)		2	2	2	6

== Medalists ==
Event	Gold	Silver	Bronze
Men's tournament	Germany; Julian Prescher; Lennart Unterfeld; Tim Riecke; Erik Beukenbusch; Arne Beckmann; Rene Kirchhoff; Jonas Vieren; Leon Konrad	Italy; Andrea Bertelloni; Giuseppe Ruggiero; Tommaso Lampo; Jan Haack; Gianmarco Emanuele; Alessandro Schiano Di Cola; Fabrizio Massa; Andrea Costagliola	Great Britain; Kartik McCutcheon; Suryan McCutcheon; Caleb Bowden; Alex Lowthorpe; Angus Boyle; Shivan McCutcheon; Fergal McConvey; Santanam McCutcheon
Women's tournament	Germany; Jill Rutzen; Esra Ozbay; Hannah Kunz; Svenja Schäper; Nele Schmalenbach; Leonie Wagner; Nina Hachenburg; Katharin Grunewald	New Zealand; Casey Hales; Hayley Austin; Jessica Azevedo-Leader; Georgia Wheeler; Tania Dugdale; Ava White; Alyssa Shepherd; Emma Malcolm	Netherlands; Selina Dijkstra; Wendy Huizinga; Thura Breedt Bruijn; Lizzy van Duijn; Linda van As; Marieke van Hofslot; Alisha van den Berg; Astrid van der Maas

== Ranking ==
=== Men ===
Rank	Team	M	W	D	L	GF	GA	GD	Points
1	Germany	6	6	0	0	32	8	+24	18
2	Italy	6	4	0	2	34	14	+20	12
3	United Kingdom	6	3	0	3	23	17	+6	9
4	Denmark	6	4	0	2	18	13	+5	12
5	France	6	4	0	2	35	20	+15	12
6	Spain	6	2	0	4	31	27	+4	6
7	Poland	6	1	0	5	25	36	−11	3
8	China	6	0	0	6	2	65	−63	0

=== Women ===
Rank	Team	M	W	D	L	GF	GA	GD	Points
1	Germany	6	6	0	0	46	7	+39	18
2	New Zealand	6	4	0	2	35	13	+23	12
3	Netherlands	6	4	1	1	40	14	+26	13
4	Italy	6	2	1	3	12	22	−10	7
5	Spain	6	2	2	2	24	15	+9	8
6	Denmark	6	1	2	3	12	15	−3	5
7	Iran	6	2	0	4	42	20	+22	6
8	China	6	0	0	6	5	110	−105	0
