= Tug of war at the 2025 World Games =

- Venue: Dong'an Lake Sports Park
- Dates: 9–11 August 2025
- No. of events: 3

The tug of war competition at the 2025 World Games took place in August 2025 at the Dong'an Lake Sports Park in Chengdu, China.

== Participating nations ==
- Belgium (17)
- Chinese Taipei (22)
- Germany (22)
- Great Britain (22)
- Italy (11)
- Netherlands (17)
- Switzerland (22)
- Sweden (11)
- United States (11)

== Medal table ==
* Host nation (China)

Rank	Nation	Gold	Silver	Bronze	Total
1	Switzerland	1	2	0	3
2	Chinese Taipei	1	0	0	1
2	Great Britain	1	0	0	1
4	Belgium	0	1	0	1
5	Germany	0	0	2	2
6	Sweden	0	0	1	1
Totals (6 entries)		3	3	3	9

== Medalists ==
Event	Gold	Silver	Bronze
Men's outdoor 640 kg	Great Britain; Joe Birch; Dan Kenny; Will Lee; Pye Murphy; Dan Nicholls; Leeboy Robinson; Jack Routley; Gaz Shaw	Switzerland; Vinzenz Arnold; Peter Erni; Sven Grani; Peter Joller; Tobias Koller; Nico Luond; Roman Muller; Fabian Rolli	Germany; Lucas Broghammer; Tim Fuss; Philip Klingele; Tobias Ortlieb; Florian Resch; Markus Resch; Johny Schuermans; Jakob Schlegel; Martin Wehrle
Women's outdoor 500 kg	Chinese Taipei; Lu Yi-Jia; Tien Chia-Hsin; Chen Yue-Ting; Lin Meng-Zhu; Lai Ting-Yu; Tien Chia-Jung; Ko Wen-Lin; Hung Ning-Hsuan	Switzerland; Andrea Joller; Elena Beier; Judith Christen; Erika Niederberger; Michaela Koch; Sarah Villiger; Carmen Rolli; Brigitte Ziegler	Sweden; Karin Jacobson; Ronja Ekstedt; Anna Nasslander; Magdalena Persson; Emelie Goransson; Anette Klinthall; Asa Haby; Hanna Westerling; Frida Hed
Mixed outdoor 580 kg	Switzerland; Elena Beier; Carmen Rolli; Melanie Villiger; Nina Widmer; Robin Burch; Ivo Lustenberger; Emanuel Zumbuhl; Jeremias Zumbühl	Belgium; Christel Covens; Kristel Mijnendonckx; Colette Puts; Gitte Snoeijs; Wim de Schutter; Robbe Gagelmans; Jan Hendrickx; Wouter Raeymaekers; Jeroen Sturm	Germany; Fabien Elias; Julia Friess; Sabrina Jund; Ramona Mühl; Valentin Fehrenbach; Raphael Kunz; Lorenz Mühl; Rainer Vogel; Thomas Wegmann
