= Namibia at the 2025 World Games =

- IOC code: NAM
- NOC: Namibia National Olympic Committee

in Chengdu, China 7 August 2025 – 17 August 2025
- Competitors: 15 (14 men and 1 woman) in 2 sports and 2 events
- Medals Ranked 77th: Gold 0 Silver 0 Bronze 1 Total 1

World Games appearances
- 1981; 1985; 1989; 1993; 1997; 2001; 2005; 2009; 2013; 2017; 2022; 2025

Namibia competed at the 2025 World Games held in Chengdu, China from 7 to 17 August 2025.

Namibian men's national inline hockey team won the first ever World Games medal for the country, which is one bronze medal. The country finished in 77th place in the medal table.

== Medalists ==
Medal	Name	Sport	Event	Date
Bronze	Namibia men's national inline hockey team	Inline hockey	Men's Inline hockey	11 August

== Competitors ==
The following is the list of number of competitors in the Games.

Sport	Men	Women	Total
Archery	0	1	1
Inline hockey	14	0	14
Total	14	1	15

== Inline hockey ==
Summary

Team	Event	Group stage				Semifinal	Final / BM	
Team	Event	Opposition Score	Opposition Score	Opposition Score	Rank	Opposition Score	Opposition Score	Rank
Namibia men	Men's tournament	Chinese Taipei; W 4–3	China; W 3–5	United States; L 7–0	2	Czech Republic; L 3–1	France; W 3–2	3rd place, bronze medalist(s)
