= Belgium at the 2025 World Games =

- IOC code: BEL
- NOC: Belgian Olympic Committee

in Chengdu, China 7 August 2025 – 17 August 2025
- Competitors: 71 (36 men and 35 women) in 18 sports and 42 events
- Medals Ranked 16th: Gold 5 Silver 5 Bronze 6 Total 16

World Games appearances (overview)
- 1981; 1985; 1989; 1993; 1997; 2001; 2005; 2009; 2013; 2017; 2022; 2025

Belgium competed at the 2025 World Games held in Chengdu, China from 7 to 17 August 2025. Athletes representing Belgium won five gold medals, five silver medals and six bronze medals. The country finished in 16th place in the medal table.

== Medalists ==
Medal	Name	Sport	Event	Date
Gold	Maysae Bouhouch; Silke Macharis	Acrobatic gymnastics	Women's pair	8 August
Gold	Brent Deklerck	Trampoline gymnastics	Men's double mini	9 August
Gold	Yannick Michiels	Orienteering	Men's sprint	10 August
Gold	Florian Bayili	Ju-jitsu	Men's 69 kg	11 August
Gold	Fran Vanhoutte	Track speed skating	Women - 500 m	14 August
Silver	Christel Covens; Kristel Mijnendonckx; Colette Puts; Gitte Snoeijs; Wim de Schutter; Robbe Gagelmans; Jan Hendrickx; Wouter Raeymaekers; Jeroen Sturm	Tug of war	Mixed outdoor 580 kg	11 August
Silver	Fran Vanhoutte	Road speed skating	Women - 1 lap	12 August
Silver	Amber Engels; Lisa Van Gorp; Lisa Pauwels; Lise Van Maldeghem; Joke Van Maldeghem; Britt Saey; Eline Denie; Nick Verwerft; Jordan De Vogelaere; Siebe De Ley; Jarre DeLey; Thomas Thijs; Joppe Bellemans; Kian Amorgaste	Korfball	Indoor	12 August
Silver	Arnaud Dely	Duathlon	Men - Individual	14 August
Silver	Sonita Muluh	Powerlifting	Women - Super heavyweight	15 August
Bronze	Vincent Bierinckx	Duathlon	Men - Individual	14 August
Bronze	Fran Vanhoutte	Track speed skating	Women - 200 m time trial	14 August
Bronze	Fran Vanhoutte	Track speed skating	Women - 1000 m sprint	15 August
Bronze	Jeanne Dupont	Duathlon	Women - Individual	15 August
Bronze	Jeanne Dupont; Arnaud Dely	Duathlon	Mixed Team Relay	17 August
Bronze	Elin Loos; Lauren Somers; Paulien Ryckx; Ruben Vergaert; Axel Van Genechten; Cedric Schoumacker	Korfball	Beach	17 August

== Competitors ==
The following is the list of number of competitors in the Games.

Sport	Men	Women	Total
Air sports	1	0	1
Archery	1	0	1
Billards	0	1	1
Canoe marathon	2	0	2
Dancesport	1	0	1
Gymnastics - Acrobatic	0	2	2
Gymnastics - Trampoline	1	1	2
Ju-jitsu	1	2	3
Korfball	10	10	20
Lifesaving	0	4	4
Muaythai	0	1	1
Orienteering	2	2	4
Powerboating	1	1	2
Powerlifting	0	1	1
Roller sports	1	1	2
Triathlon	3	2	5
Tug of war	11	6	17
Wakeboarding	0	1	1
Wushu	1	0	1
Total	36	35	71

== Korfball ==
Belgium qualified in korfball at the 2023 IKF World Korfball Championship.

Indoor

Athlete	Event	Group stage				Semi-final	Final	
Athlete	Event	Opposition Score	Opposition Score	Opposition Score	Rank	Opposition Score	Opposition Score	Rank
Team Belgium	Korfball	Czech Republic; W 26-10	Germany; W 27-14	Suriname; W 15-11	1	Chinese Taipei; W 19-13	Netherlands; L 16-23	2nd place, silver medalist(s)

Beach

Belgium qualified in beach korfball at the 2024 World Beach Korfball Championship.

Athlete	Event	Group stage				Quarterfinal	Semi-final	Final / BM	
Athlete	Event	Opposition Score	Opposition Score	Opposition Score	Rank	Opposition Score	Opposition Score	Opposition Score	Rank
Team Belgium	Beach Korfball	Poland; W 6-16	Netherlands; L 11-4	Australia; W 15-3	2	China; W 2–13	Chinese Taipei; L 8-7	Hungary; W 5-10	3rd place, bronze medalist(s)

== Powerlifting ==
Classic

Athlete	Event	Exercises			Total weight	Total points	Rank
Athlete	Event	Squat	Bench press	Deadlift	Total weight	Total points	Rank
Sonita Kyen Muluh	Women's Super Heavyweight	305.0	157.5	265.0	727.5	122.57	2nd place, silver medalist(s)

== Trampoline gymnastics ==
Belgium qualified two athletes at the 2023 Trampoline Gymnastics World Championships.

Athlete	Event	Qualification		Final	
Athlete	Event	Score	Rank	Score	Rank
Brent Deklerck	Men's double mini-trampoline	55.900	3	26.800	1st place, gold medalist(s)
Lani Spiessens	Women's tumbling	48.200	4	24.900	4

== Tug of war ==
Athlete	Event	Group stage						Semi-final	Final / BM	
Athlete	Event	Opposition Score	Opposition Score	Opposition Score	Opposition Score	Opposition Score	Rank	Opposition Score	Opposition Score	Rank
Team Belgium	Men's outdoor 640 kg	Switzerland; D 1 - 1	Great Britain; L 0 - 3	Chinese Taipei; W 3 - 0	Germany; L 0 - 3	Netherlands; W 3 - 0	4	Great Britain; L 0 - 3	Germany; L 1 - 2	4
Team Belgium	Mixed outdoor 580 kg	Netherlands; W 3 - 0	Switzerland; D 1 - 1	Italy; W 3 - 0	Germany; W 3 - 0	Chinese Taipei; W 3 - 0	2	Germany; W 3 - 0	Switzerland; L 0 - 3	2nd place, silver medalist(s)
