= Austria at the 2025 World Games =

- IOC code: AUT
- NOC: Austrian Olympic Committee

in Chengdu, China 7 August 2025 – 17 August 2025
- Competitors: 70 (29 men and 41 women) in 13 sports and 30 events
- Medals Ranked 40th: Gold 1 Silver 2 Bronze 1 Total 4

World Games appearances
- 1981; 1985; 1989; 1993; 1997; 2001; 2005; 2009; 2013; 2017; 2022; 2025

Austria competed at the 2025 World Games held in Chengdu, China from 7 to 17 August 2025.

Athletes representing Austria won one gold medal, two silver medals and one bronze medal. The country finished in 40th place in the medal table.

== Medalists ==
Medal	Name	Sport	Event	Date
Gold	Erik Zimmermann	Kickboxing	Men's point fighting 74 kg	14 August
Silver	Johannes Horak; Gernot Riegl	Ju-jitsu	Mixed duo team open	10 August
Silver	Johannes Horak; Gernot Riegl	Ju-jitsu	Mixed duo show open	11 August
Bronze	Martin Puhringer; Marcel Wiesinger; Lukas Eidenhammer; Fabian Hofstadler-Trobinger; Philipp Einsiedler; Elias Eckerstorfer; Elias Walchshofer; Michael Holzl; Maximilian Jan Holzweber; Karl Mullehner	Fistball	Men's tournament	13 August

== Competitors ==
The following is the list of number of competitors in the Games.

Sport	Men	Women	Total
Air sports	1	0	1
American football	0	12	12
Archery	1	1	2
Fistball	10	10	20
Flying disc	7	7	14
Gymnastics	1	0	1
Ju-jitsu	3	3	6
Muaythai	0	1	1
Orienteering	4	4	8
Speed skating	0	1	1
Squash	1	1	2
Wakeboarding	0	2	2
Total	29	41	70

== Flag football ==
Women

Team	Event	Group play				Quarterfinals	Semifinal	Final / BM	
Team	Event	Opposition Result	Opposition Result	Opposition Result	Rank	Opposition Result	Opposition Result	Opposition Result	Rank
Austria women	Women's tournament	China; W 45–47	United States; L 48–34	Canada; L 34–25	3	Great Britain; W 28–40	United States; L 46–39	Canada; W 20–38	4

== Fistball ==
Austria qualified in the men's fistball tournament by finishing at 2023 World Championships and women's fistball tournament by finishing at 2023 European Championship.

Team	Event	Group Stage				Quarterfinal	Semifinal	Final / BM	
Team	Event	Opposition Score	Opposition Score	Opposition Score	Rank	Opposition Score	Opposition Score	Opposition Score	Rank
Austria men's	Men's tournament	Switzerland; W 3–0	Brazil; L 0–3	Germany; L 3–1	3	Italy; W 3–0	Germany; L 3–1	Switzerland; W 1–3	3rd place, bronze medalist(s)
Austria women's	Women's tournament	Germany; L 3–0	Brazil; L 3–1	Switzerland; L 3–1	4	Chile; W 3–2	Brazil; L 3–1	Germany; L 0–3	4

== Gymnastics ==
=== Parkour ===
Men

Athlete	Event	Qualification		Final	
Athlete	Event	Result	Rank	Result	Rank
Tobias Kahofer	Men's speed	32.61	8 R	Did not advance	
Tobias Kahofer	Men's freestyle	26.0	2 Q	14.5	7

== Squash ==
Athlete	Event	Round of 32	Round of 16 / CR	Quarterfinals / CQ	Semi-finals / CS	Final / BM / CF	
Athlete	Event	Opposition Score	Opposition Score	Opposition Score	Opposition Score	Opposition Score	Rank
Daniel Lutz	Men's singles	White (AUS); L 3–0	Classification round Iqbal (PAK); L 0–3	Consolation round Zhu (CHN); W 0–3	Consolation round Shcherbakov (UKR); L 3–2	Did not advance	=27
Jacqueline Peychar	Women's singles	Chukwu (HUN); L 3–0	Classification round Yin (CHN); W 0–3	Classification round Sramkova (CZE); W 3–2	Classification round Bautista (COL); L 1–3	Did not advance	=19
