= Fistball at the 2025 World Games =

- Venue: Tianfu Park
- Dates: 9–13 August 2025
- No. of events: 2
- Competitors: 2 teams from 9 nations

The fistball competition at the 2025 World Games took place from 9 to 13 August 2025 at the Tianfu Park in Chengdu, China. The competition included two team events (one for men and one for women).

== Qualification ==
A total of sixteen teams qualified for the events:

| Event | Location | Dates | Total places | Qualified NOCs |
Men's – 8 teams
| Host nation | —N/a | —N/a | 1 | —N/a |
| 2023 Men's Fistball World Championships [de] | (Germany) Mannheim | 22–29 July 2023 | 4 | Germany; Austria; Brazil; Switzerland |
| 2024 European Men's Fistball Championships [de] | (Switzerland) Frauenfeld | 21–24 August 2024 | 1 | Italy |
| Continental Championships x2 | TBD | TBD | 3 | Argentina; Australia; Chile |
Women's – 8 teams
| Host nation | —N/a | —N/a | 1 | —N/a |
| 2023 European Women's Fistball Championships [de] | (Austria) Grieskirchen | 18–19 August 2023 | 1 | Germany |
| 2024 Women's Fistball World Championships [de] | (Argentina) Montecarlo | 7–10 November 2024 | 4 | Brazil; Switzerland; Austria; Chile |
| Continental Championships x2 | TBD | TBD | 3 | Argentina; New Zealand; United States |

== Participating nations ==
- Argentina
- Austria
- Brazil
- Chile
- Germany
- Italy
- New Zealand
- Switzerland
- United States

== Medal table ==
* Host nation (China)

| Rank | Nation | Gold | Silver | Bronze | Total |
|---|---|---|---|---|---|
| 1 | Brazil | 2 | 0 | 0 | 2 |
| 2 | Germany | 0 | 1 | 1 | 2 |
| 3 | Switzerland | 0 | 1 | 0 | 1 |
| 4 | Austria | 0 | 0 | 1 | 1 |
| Totals (4 entries) | | 2 | 2 | 2 | 6 |

== Medalists ==
| Event | Gold | Silver | Bronze |
|---|---|---|---|
| Men | Brazil; Gabriel Petry Heck; Vinicius Goulart; Álvaro Englert; Gabriel Wazlawick Drumm; Mateus Blos Jung; Thomas Suffert; Mateus D'Agostin; Bruno Arnold; Arthur Holz; Ermínio Goldani | Germany; Philip Hofmann; Hauke Spille; Johannes Jungclaussen; Jaro Jungclaussen; Felix Klassen; Tom Hartung; Oliver Kraut; Timon Lutzow; Jakob Kilpper; Maximilian Lutz | Austria; Martin Puhringer; Marcel Wiesinger; Lukas Eidenhammer; Fabian Hofstadler-Trobinger; Philipp Einsiedler; Elias Eckerstorfer; Elias Walchshofer; Michael Holzl; Maximilian Jan Holzweber; Karl Mullehner |
| Women | Brazil; Julia Hoberrek; Sabine Suffert; Giovanna Lucchin; Maria Eduarda Aguero; Cristiane de Souza; Manuela Zott Jacobs; Luna Ebert; Bianca Suffert; Cecilia Jaques | Switzerland; Sara Peterhans; Corinne Staheli; Fabienne Frischknecht; Tanja Bognar; Adela Lang; Rahel Hess; Marketa Lang; Jamie Bucher; Mirjam Schlattinger; Kim Sprenger | Germany; Maya Mehle; Henriette Schell; Denise Zeiher; Ida Hollmann; Pia Neuefeind; Jordan Nadermann; Helle Grossmann; Svenja Schroeder; Michaela Grzywatz; Ann-Kathrin Motteler |
