= Switzerland at the 2025 World Games =

- IOC code: SUI
- NOC: Swiss Olympic Association

in Chengdu, China 7 August 2025 – 17 August 2025
- Competitors: 102 (53 men and 49 women) in 12 sports and 34 events
- Medals Ranked 11th: Gold 7 Silver 5 Bronze 2 Total 14

World Games appearances
- 1981; 1985; 1989; 1993; 1997; 2001; 2005; 2009; 2013; 2017; 2022; 2025

Switzerland will compete at the 2025 World Games held in Chengdu, China from 7 to 17 August 2025. Athletes representing Switzerland won seven gold medals, five silver medals and two bronze medals. The country finished in 11th place in the medal table.

== Medalists ==
| Medal | Name | Sport | Event | Date |
|---|---|---|---|---|
| Gold | Riccardo Rancan | Orienteering | Men's middle distance | 8 August |
| Gold | Simona Aebersold | Orienteering | Women's middle distance | 8 August |
| Gold | Elena Quirici | Karate | Women's kumite 68 kg | 9 August |
| Gold | Simona Aebersold | Orienteering | Women's sprint | 10 August |
| Gold | Riccardo Rancan; Tino Polsini; Natalia Gemperle; Simona Aebersold | Orienteering | Mixed sprint relay | 11 August |
| Gold | Elena Beier; Carmen Rolli; Melanie Villiger; Nina Widmer; Robin Burch; Ivo Lustenberger; Emanuel Zumbuhl; Jeremias Zumbuhl | Tug of war | Mixed outdoor 580 kg | 11 August |
| Gold | Caryl Cordt-Moeller | Parkour | Men's speed | 13 August |
| Silver | Vinzenz Arnold; Peter Erni; Sven Grani; Peter Joller; Tobias Koller; Nico Luond; Roman Muller; Fabian Rolli | Tug of war | Men's outdoor 640 kg | 9 August |
| Silver | Natalia Gemperle | Orienteering | Women's sprint | 10 August |
| Silver | Elena Beier; Judith Christen; Andrea Joller; Michaela Koch; Erika Niederberger; Carmen Rolli; Sarah Villiger; Brigitte Ziegler | Tug of war | Women's outdoor 500 kg | 10 August |
| Silver | Sara Peterhans; Corinne Staheli; Fabienne Frischknecht; Tanja Bognar; Adela Lang; Rahel Hess; Marketa Lang; Jamie Bucher; Mirjam Schlattinger; Kim Sprenger | Fistball | Women's tournament | 13 August |
| Silver | Livio Wenger | Track speed skating | Men's elimination race 10,000 metre | 14 August |
| Bronze | Ladina Tondury; Naja Ritter; Laila Ediz; Céline Stettler; Seraina Fitzi; Doris Berger; Isabelle Gerig; Norina Reusser; Nina Metzger; Marcia Week; Linn Larssen; Anja Wyss; Lara Heini; Chiara Gredig | Floorball | Women's tournament | 13 August |
| Bronze | Livio Wenger | Track speed skating | Men's point race 5,000 metre | 14 August |

Medals by sport
| Sport | 1st place, gold medalist(s) | 2nd place, silver medalist(s) | 3rd place, bronze medalist(s) | Total |
| Orienteering | 4 | 1 | 0 | 5 |
| Tug of war | 1 | 2 | 0 | 3 |
| Karate | 1 | 0 | 0 | 1 |
| Parkour | 1 | 0 | 0 | 1 |
| Track speed skating | 0 | 1 | 1 | 2 |
| Fistball | 0 | 1 | 0 | 1 |
| Floorball | 0 | 0 | 1 | 1 |
| Total | 7 | 5 | 2 | 14 |

== Competitors ==
The following is the list of number of competitors in the Games.

| Sport | Men | Women | Total |
|---|---|---|---|
| Fistball | 10 | 10 | 20 |
| Floorball | 14 | 14 | 28 |
| Gymnastics | 1 | 0 | 1 |
| Ju-jitsu | 0 | 2 | 2 |
| Karate | 0 | 1 | 1 |
| Kickboxing | 1 | 0 | 1 |
| Orienteering | 8 | 6 | 14 |
| Road speed skating Track speed skating | 2 | 0 | 2 |
| Squash | 2 | 2 | 4 |
| Tug of war | 14 | 13 | 27 |
| Wakeboarding | 1 | 0 | 1 |
| Wushu | 2 | 1 | 3 |
| Total | 53 | 49 | 102 |

== Fistball ==
| Team | Event | Group Stage | | | | Quarterfinal | Semifinal | Final / BM | |
| Team | Event | Opposition Score | Opposition Score | Opposition Score | Rank | Opposition Score | Opposition Score | Opposition Score | Rank |
|---|---|---|---|---|---|---|---|---|---|
| Switzerland men's | Men's tournament | Austria; L 3–0 | Germany; L 3–0 | Brazil; L 3–0 | 4 | Chile; W 3–0 | Brazil; L 3–0 | Austria; L 1–3 | 4 |
| Switzerland women's | Women's tournament | Brazil; L 3–2 | Germany; W 2–3 | Austria; W 3–1 | 2 | —N/a | Germany; W 3–2 | Brazil; W 3–2 | 2nd place, silver medalist(s) |

== Floorball ==
Summary

| Team | Event | Preliminary round | | | | Semifinal | Final / BM / PF | |
| Team | Event | Opposition Result | Opposition Result | Opposition Result | Rank | Opposition Result | Opposition Result | Rank |
|---|---|---|---|---|---|---|---|---|
| Switzerland men | Men's tournament | Latvia; W 3–4 | Sweden; L 8–1 | Philippines; W 18–0 | 2 | Finland; L 4–0 | Czech Republic; L 7–2 | 4 |
| Switzerland women | Women's tournament | Slovakia; W 8–2 | Thailand; W 19–1 | Sweden; L 7–3 | 2 | Finland; L 5–1 | Czech Republic; W 3–4 | 3rd place, bronze medalist(s) |

== Gymnastics ==
=== Parkour ===
Men

| Athlete | Event | Qualification | | Final | |
| Athlete | Event | Result | Rank | Result | Rank |
|---|---|---|---|---|---|
| Caryl Cordt-Moeller | Men's speed | 27.42 | 3 Q | 25.30 | 1st place, gold medalist(s) |
| Caryl Cordt-Moeller | Men's freestyle | 21.2 | 6 Q | 17.1 | 6 |

== Squash ==
| Athlete | Event | Round of 32 | Round of 16 / CR | Quarterfinals / CQ | Semi-finals / CS | Final / BM / CF | |
| Athlete | Event | Opposition Score | Opposition Score | Opposition Score | Opposition Score | Opposition Score | Rank |
|---|---|---|---|---|---|---|---|
| Yannick Wilhemi | Men's singles | Krysiak (POL); W 1–3 | J. Franco (GUA); W 1–3 | Crouin (FRA); L 3–0 | Did not advance | | =5 |
| Dimitri Steinmann | Men's singles | Iqbal (PAK); W 0–3 | White (AUS); W 2–3 | Leung (HKG); W 0–3 | Farkas (HUN); L 3–0 | Rodriguez (COL); L 3–1 | 4 |
| Ambre Allinckx | Women's singles | Sramkova (CZE); W 3–0 | Hani (EGY); L 1–3 | Classification round Chukwu (HUN); L 3–2 | Did not advance | | =13 |
| Cindy Merlo | Women's singles | Barbeau (FRA); W 3–0 | Gomez (ESP); W 3–0 | Ho (HKG); L 0–3 | Did not advance | | =5 |

== Tug of war ==
| Athlete | Event | Group stage | | | | | | Semi-final | Final / BM | |
| Athlete | Event | Opposition Score | Opposition Score | Opposition Score | Opposition Score | Opposition Score | Rank | Opposition Score | Opposition Score | Rank |
|---|---|---|---|---|---|---|---|---|---|---|
| Team Switzerland | Women's outdoor 500 kg | | | | | | | | | |
| Team Switzerland | Men's outdoor 640 kg | | | | | | | | | |
| Team Switzerland | Mixed outdoor 580 kg | | | | | | | | | |
