= Hong Kong at the 2025 World Games =

- IOC code: HKG
- NOC: Sports Federation and Olympic Committee of Hong Kong, China

in Chengdu, China 7 August 2025 – 17 August 2025
- Competitors: 22 (11 men and 11 women) in 7 sports and 20 events
- Flag bearers: Lau Tsz Kwan & Shum Hiu Yu Lydia
- Medals Ranked 29th: Gold 3 Silver 2 Bronze 1 Total 6

World Games appearances
- 1981; 1985; 1989; 1993; 1997; 2001; 2005; 2009; 2013; 2017; 2022; 2025

Hong Kong competed at the 2025 World Games held in Chengdu, China from 7 to 17 August 2025.

Athletes representing Hong Kong won three gold medals, two silver medals and one bronze medal. The country finished in 29th place in the medal table

== Medalists ==
| Medal | Name | Sport | Event | Date |
|---|---|---|---|---|
| Gold | Grace Lau | Karate | Women's kata | 8 August |
| Gold | Yeung Chung Hei | Wushu | Men's taijiquan / taijijian combined | 9 August |
| Gold | Sham Hiu Yu Lydia | Wushu | Women's changquan / daoshu / gunshu combined | 9 August |
| Silver | Cheung Yat Lam | Wushu | Men's 70 kg | 12 August |
| Silver | Kwan Chun Yan | Air sports | Mixed drone racing | 16 August |
| Bronze | Cheng Chun Hin Harry | Wakeboarding | Men's Wake Surf Skim | 10 August |

== Competitors ==
The following is the list of number of competitors in the Games.

| Sport | Men | Women | Total |
|---|---|---|---|
| Air sports | 1 | 0 | 1 |
| Billards | 1 | 2 | 3 |
| Karate | 0 | 1 | 1 |
| Orienteering | 2 | 2 | 4 |
| Squash | 2 | 2 | 4 |
| Wakeboarding | 3 | 1 | 4 |
| Wushu | 2 | 3 | 5 |
| Total | 11 | 11 | 22 |

== Squash ==
| Athlete | Event | Round of 32 | Round of 16 / CR | Quarterfinals / CQ | Semi-finals / CS | Final / BM / CF | |
| Athlete | Event | Opposition Score | Opposition Score | Opposition Score | Opposition Score | Opposition Score | Rank |
|---|---|---|---|---|---|---|---|
| Tsz Kwan Lau | Men's singles | Adegoke (NGR); W 3–1 | Nasser (EGY); W 3–0 | Rodriguez (COL); L 0–3 | Did not advance | | =5 |
| Henry Leung | Men's singles | Zhu (CHN); W 3–0 | Mekhalfi (FRA); W 3–1 | Steinmann (SUI); L 0–3 | Did not advance | | =5 |
| Ka Yi Lee | Women's singles | Ghiorshisor (ROU); W 0–3 | Lincou (FRA); W 0–3 | Dominguez (ESP); L 3–2 | Did not advance | | =5 |
| Tze Lok Ho | Women's singles | Liu (CHN); W 0–3 | Ward (RSA); W 1–3 | Merlo (SUI); W 0–3 | Stephan (FRA); L 3–2 | Dominguez (ESP); L 3–0 | 4 |
