= New Zealand at the 2025 World Games =

- IOC code: NZL
- NOC: New Zealand Olympic Committee

in Chengdu, China 7 August 2025 – 17 August 2025
- Competitors: 64 (28 men and 36 women) in 10 sports and 40 events
- Medals Ranked 28th: Gold 3 Silver 2 Bronze 3 Total 8

World Games appearances (overview)
- 1981; 1985; 1989; 1993; 1997; 2001; 2005; 2009; 2013; 2017; 2022; 2025

New Zealand competed at the 2025 World Games held in Chengdu, China, from 7 to 17 August 2025.

Athletes representing New Zealand won three gold medals, two silver medals and three bronze medals. The country finished in 28th place in the medal table.

== Medalists ==
| Medal | Name | Sport | Event | Date |
|---|---|---|---|---|
| Gold | Fergus Eadie | Lifesaving | Men's 50 metres manikin carry | 9 August |
| Gold | Zoe Crawford | Lifesaving | Women's 100 metres manikin tow with fins | 9 August |
| Gold | Karlina Tongotea | Powerlifting | Women's heavyweight | 15 August |
| Silver | Megan-Li Smith | Powerlifting | Women's lightweight | 14 August |
| Silver | Casey Hales; Hayley Austin; Jessica Azevedo-Leader; Georgia Wheeler; Tania Dugdale; Ava White; Alyssa Shepherd; Emma Malcolm | Canoe polo | Women's tournament | 16 August |
| Bronze | Fergus Eadie | Lifesaving | Men's 100 metres manikin carry with fins | 8 August |
| Bronze | Madison Kidd | Lifesaving | Women's 100 metres manikin tow with fins | 9 August |
| Bronze | Evie Corrigan | Powerlifting | Women's lightweight | 14 August |

== Competitors ==
The following is the list of number of competitors in the Games.

| Sport | Men | Women | Total |
|---|---|---|---|
| Archery | 1 | 0 | 1 |
| Canoe | 2 | 10 | 12 |
| Fistball | 10 | 10 | 20 |
| Kickboxing | 0 | 2 | 2 |
| Lifesaving | 4 | 3 | 7 |
| Orienteering | 4 | 4 | 8 |
| Powerlifting | 1 | 3 | 4 |
| Road speed skating Track speed skating | 1 | 0 | 1 |
| Sport climbing | 4 | 4 | 8 |
| Wakeboarding | 1 | 1 | 2 |
| Total | 28 | 36 | 64 |

== Archery ==
Target - Compound

| Athlete | Event | Qualification | | Round of 32 | Round of 16 | Quarterfinals | Semifinal | Final / BM | |
| Athlete | Event | Score | Rank | Opposition Result | Opposition Result | Opposition Result | Opposition Result | Opposition Result | Rank |
|---|---|---|---|---|---|---|---|---|---|
| Riku van Tonder | Men's Compound | 697 | 23 | Yadav (IND); L 147–150 | Did not advance | | | | 17 |

== Fistball ==
| Team | Event | Group Stage | | | | Quarterfinal | Semifinal | Final / BM | |
| Team | Event | Opposition Score | Opposition Score | Opposition Score | Rank | Opposition Score | Opposition Score | Opposition Score | Rank |
|---|---|---|---|---|---|---|---|---|---|
| New Zealand men's | Men's tournament | Argentina; L 3–0 | Chile; L 3–1 | Italy; L 3–0 | 4 | —N/a | Chile; L 3–1 | Argentina; L 1–3 | 8 |
| New Zealand women's | Women's tournament | Chile; W 2–3 | Argentina; L 3–2 | United States; W 3–0 | 2 | Germany; L 3–0 | Argentina; W 3–1 | Chile; L 3–0 | 6 |

== Powerlifting ==
Classic

| Athlete | Event | Exercises | | | Total weight | Total points | Rank |
| Athlete | Event | Squat | Bench press | Deadlift | Total weight | Total points | Rank |
|---|---|---|---|---|---|---|---|
| Jewel Tasi | Women's Super heavyweight | 275.0 | 147.5 | 255.0 | 677.5 | 115.79 | 4 |
| Karlina Tongotea | Women's heavyweight | 230.0 | 130.0 | 260.0 | 620.0 | 122.61 | 1st place, gold medalist(s) |
| Evie Corrigen | Women's lightweight | 165.0 | 105.0 | 207.5 | 477.5 | 120.79 | 3rd place, bronze medalist(s) |
| Megan-Li Smith | Women's lightweight | 180.0 W | 105.0 | 197.5 | 482.5 | 122.69 | 2nd place, silver medalist(s) |
