= Germany at the 2025 World Games =

- IOC code: GER
- NOC: German Olympic Sports Confederation

in Chengdu, China 7 August 2025 – 17 August 2025
- Competitors: 220 (109 men and 111 women) in 25 sports and 115 events
- Medals Ranked 2nd: Gold 17 Silver 14 Bronze 14 Total 45

World Games appearances
- 1981; 1985; 1989; 1993; 1997; 2001; 2005; 2009; 2013; 2017; 2022; 2025

Germany competed at the 2025 World Games held in Chengdu, China from 7 to 17 August 2025. Athletes representing Germany won 17 gold medals, 14 silver medals and 14 bronze medals. The country finished in 2nd place in the medal table.

== Medalists ==
Medal	Name	Sport	Event	Date
Gold	Nina Holt	Lifesaving	Women's 100 metres rescue medley	8 August
Gold	Nina Holt; Julia Hennig; Lena Oppermann; Undine Lauerwald	Lifesaving	Women's 4x50-metres pool life saver relay	8 August
Gold	Khrystyna Moshenska; Marius Balan	Dancesport	Latin	8 August
Gold	Mia Bitsch	Karate	Women's kumite 55 kg	8 August
Gold	Nina Holt	Lifesaving	Women's 50 metres manikin carry	9 August
Gold	Alica Gebhardt; Undine Lauerwald; Lena Oppermann; Nina Holt	Lifesaving	Women's 4x25-metres manikin relay	9 August
Gold	Alica Gebhardt; Undine Lauerwald; Lena Oppermann; Nina Holt	Lifesaving	Women's 4x50-metres medley relay	9 August
Gold	Johanna Kneer	Karate	Women's kumite +68 kg	9 August
Gold	Julia Rick	Wakeboarding	Women's Cable Wakeboard	10 August
Gold	Max Poschart	Finswimming	Men's 100 metre surface	10 August
Gold	Max Poschart; Niklas Loßner; Justus Mörstedt; Marek Leipold	Finswimming	Men's 4 x 50 metre surface relay	10 August
Gold	Sophie Büscher	Ju-jitsu	Women's 57 kg fighting	11 August
Gold	Max Poschart; Niklas Loßner; Justus Mörstedt; Marek Leipold	Finswimming	Men's 4 x 100 metre surface relay	11 August
Gold	Nike Hunecke; Julia Paszkiewicz	Ju-jitsu	Mixed duo para visual	12 August
Gold	Moritz Ebert; Timo Gunther; Severin Henrich; Jannis Herr; Robin John; Lennart Liebeck; Hendrik Prahst; Lennart Wormann; Lars Zelser; Tobias Zeyen	Beach handball	Men's tournament	12 August
Gold	Katharin Grunewald; Nina Hachenburg; Hannah Kunz; Esra Ozbay; Jill Rutzen; Svenja Schaeper; Nele Schmalenbach; Lionie Wagner	Canoe polo	Women's tournament	16 August
Gold	Arne Beckmann; Erik Beukenbusch; Rene Kirchhoff; Leon Konrad; Julian Prescher; Tim Riecke; Lennart Unterfeld; Jonas Vieren	Canoe polo	Men's tournament	16 August
Silver	Lena Oppermann	Lifesaving	Women's 100 metres rescue medley	8 August
Silver	Sebastien Pierre Louis; Jan Malkowski; Danny Wieck; Tim Brang	Lifesaving	Men's 4x50-metres pool life saver relay	8 August
Silver	Lena Oppermann	Lifesaving	Women's 100 metres manikin carry with fins	8 August
Silver	Alica Gebhardt	Lifesaving	Women's 200 metres super lifasaver	8 August
Silver	Lena Oppermann	Lifesaving	Women's 50 metres manikin carry	9 August
Silver	Undine Lauerwald	Lifesaving	Women's 100 metres tow carry with fins	9 August
Silver	Max Milde	Wakeboarding	Men's Cable Wakeboard	10 August
Silver	Justus Mörstedt	Finswimming	Men's 100 metre surface	10 August
Silver	Max Poschart	Finswimming	Men's 50 m apnoea	11 August
Silver	Justus Mörstedt	Finswimming	Men's 200 metre surface	11 August
Silver	Alessandro Schober; Christine Jahn	Ju-jitsu	Mixed duo para physical	12 August
Silver	Pauline Borrmann; Julia Drachsler; Belen Gettwart; Isabel Kattner; Lena Klingler; Lucie Kretzschmar; Nele Kurzke; Amelie Mollmann; Emma Pilz; Kirsten Walter	Beach handball	Women's tournament	12 August
Silver	Philip Hofmann; Hauke Spille; Johannes Jungclaussen; Jaro Jungclaussen; Felix Klassen; Tom Hartung; Oliver Kraut; Timon Lutzow; Jakob Kilpper; Maximilian Lutz	Fistball	Men's tournament	13 August
Silver	Stefanie Megerle	Kickboxing	Women's point fighting 70 kg	14 August
Bronze	Felix Hofmann	Lifesaving	Men's 200 metres super lifasaver	8 August
Bronze	Caio Lauxtermann; Fabian Vogel	Trampoline gymnastics	Men's synchronized	8 August
Bronze	Lucas Broghammer; Tim Fuss; Philip Klingele; Tobias Ortlieb; Florian Resch; Markus Resch; Johny Schuermans; Jakob Schlegel; Martin Wehrle	Tug of war	Men's outdoor 640 kg	9 August
Bronze	Sebastien Pierre; Jan Malkowski; Danny Wieck; David Laufkotter	Lifesaving	Men's 4x50-metres medley relay	9 August
Bronze	Florian Weiherer	Wakeboarding	Men's Cable Wakeboard	10 August
Bronze	Fabien Elias; Julia Friess; Sabrina Jund; Ramona Mühl; Valentin Fehrenbach; Raphael Kunz; Lorenz Mühl; Rainer Vogel; Thomas Wegmann	Tug of war	Mixed outdoor 580 kg	11 August
Bronze	Franziska Freudenberger	Ju-jitsu	Women's 63 kg fighting	11 August
Bronze	Anna-Laethisia Schimek	Road speed skating	Women's 1 lap	12 August
Bronze	Ron Pucklitzsch	Road speed skating	Men's 100 metre sprint	13 August
Bronze	Maya Mehle; Henriette Schell; Denise Zeiher; Ida Hollmann; Pia Neuefeind; Jordan Nadermann; Helle Grossmann; Svenja Schroeder; Michaela Grzywatz; Ann-Kathrin Motteler	Fistball	Women's tournament	13 August
Bronze	Martin Horn	Carom	Men's carom three cushion	13 August
Bronze	Joshua Filler	Pool	Men's pool	13 August
Bronze	Alexander Widau	Snooker	Men's 15-reds snooker	13 August
Bronze	Larissa Gaiser	Track speed skating	Women's 5000 metres point race	14 August

== Competitors ==
The following is the list of number of competitors in the Games.

Sport	Men	Women	Total
Air sports	2	0	2
Archery	2	2	4
Beach handball	10	10	20
Billards	3	2	5
Canoe marathon	2	2	4
Canoe polo	8	8	16
Dancesport	4	4	8
Fistball	10	10	20
Flying disc	14	14	28
Gymnastics - Acrobatic	4	3	7
Gymnastics - Trampoline	2	1	3
Ju-jitsu	4	4	8
Karate	0	3	3
Kickboxing	1	1	2
Korfball	7	7	14
Lifesaving	4	4	8
Orienteering	4	4	8
Powerboating	1	1	2
Powerlifting	0	2	2
Racquetball	1	1	2
Roller sports	2	2	4
Sport climbing	2	2	4
Squash	2	2	4
Triathlon	1	3	4
Tug of war	11	11	22
Underwater sports	4	4	8
Wakeboarding	4	3	7
Total	109	111	220

== Archery ==
Athlete	Event	Ranking round		Elimination round				Semifinals	Final / BM	
Athlete	Event	Score	Seed	Opposition Score	Opposition Score	Opposition Score	Opposition Score	Opposition Score	Opposition Score	Rank
Michael Meyer	Men's individual barebow	340	4	—N/a			Vera (ESP); L 82–78	Did not advance		
Florian Unruh	Men's individual recurve	380	2	—N/a				Huston (GBR); L 61–64	Bakker (NED); L 59–60	4
Christine Schäfer	Women's individual barebow	276	11	Carcacha (ARG); W 56–61	Björklund (SWE); W 61–63	Leitner (AUT); L 60–57	—N/a	Did not advance		
Elisa Tartler	Women's individual recurve	370	1	—N/a				Rebagliati (ITA); L 53–53	di Francesco (ITA); L 56–61	4

== Beach handball ==
Germany qualified at the 2024 Men's Beach Handball World Championships and 2024 Women's Beach Handball World Championships from China.

Team	Event	Preliminary round				Quarterfinal	Semifinal	Final / BM / PM	
Team	Event	Opposition Result	Opposition Result	Opposition Result	Rank	Opposition Result	Opposition Result	Opposition Result	Rank
Germany men's	Men's tournament	Croatia; W 2–1	Portugal; L 1–2	Brazil; L 1–2	3	Denmark; W 2–1	Brazil; W 2–1	Portugal; W 2–1	1st place, gold medalist(s)
Germany women's	Women's tournament	Spain; W 2–0	Vietnam; W 2–0	Denmark; W 2–0	1	China; W 2–0	Denmark; W 2–0	Argentina; L 1–2	2nd place, silver medalist(s)

== Billiards ==
Athlete	Event	Group stage			Quarter-final	Semi-final	Final / BM	
Athlete	Event	Opposition Score	Opposition Score	Rank	Opposition Score	Opposition Score	Opposition Score	Rank
Martin Horn	Men's carom 3-cushion	Tellez (CRC); W 40–19	Cho (KOR); W 40–38	1 Q	Piedrabuena (USA); W 40–31	Sidhom (EGY); L 32–40	Tran (VIE)	
Joshua Filler	Men's pool 10-ball	Szewczyk (POL); W 9–5	Hsieh (TPE); W 9–5	1 Q	Maciol (POL); W 9–8	Martinez (PER); L 7–9	Szewczyk (POL)	
Pia Filler	Women's 10-ball	Amit (PHI); W 7–4	Liu (CHN); L 5–7	2 Q	Han (CHN); L 5–7	Did not advance		
Ina Kaplan	Women's 10-ball	Tkach (AIN); W 7–5	Ropero (ESP); L 4–7	2 Q	Hung (AUS); W 7–3	Han (CHN); L 3–7	Liu (CHN)	
Alexander Widau	Men's snooker 15-reds	Liang (CHN); W 2–0	Asif (PAK); L 1–2	2 Q	Al-Obaidli (QAT); W 2–0	Georgiou (CYP); L 1–2	Asif (PAK)	

== Canoe marathon ==
Athlete	Event	Heats		Final	
Athlete	Event	Time	Rank	Time	Rank
Nico Paufler	Men's K-1 short distance	14:47.94	2 F	14:16.26	5
Nico Paufler	Men's K-1 long distance	—N/a		1:38:38.79	7
Caroline Heuser	Women's K-1 short distance	16:28.49	3 F	16:24.34	11
Caroline Heuser	Women's K-1 long distance	—N/a		1:57:02.34	12

== Canoe polo ==
Team	Event	Preliminary round				Quarterfinal	Semifinal	Final / BM / PM	
Team	Event	Opposition Result	Opposition Result	Opposition Result	Rank	Opposition Result	Opposition Result	Opposition Result	Rank
Germany men's	Men's tournament	Italy (ITA); W 7–5	Great Britain (GBR)	China (CHN)					
Germany women's	Woen's tournament	New Zealand (NZL); W 4–1	China (CHN)	Iran (IRI)					

== Fistball ==
Germany qualified in the men's fistball tournament by finishing at 2023 World Championships and women's fistball tournament by finishing at 2023 European Championship.

Team	Event	Group Stage				Quarterfinal	Semifinal	Final / BM	
Team	Event	Opposition Score	Opposition Score	Opposition Score	Rank	Opposition Score	Opposition Score	Opposition Score	Rank
Germany men's	Men's tournament	Brazil; L 1–3	Switzerland; W 3–0	Austria; W 3–1	2	—N/a	Austria; W 3–1	Brazil; L 3–0	2nd place, silver medalist(s)
Germany women's	Women's tournament	Austria; W 3–0	Switzerland; L 2–3	Brazil; L 3–1	3	New Zealand; W 3–0	Switzerland; L 3–2	Austria; W 0–3	3rd place, bronze medalist(s)

== Gymnastics ==
Acrobatic

Athlete	Event	Qualification						Final	
Athlete	Event	Balance Exercise		Dynamic Exercise		Total		Final	
Athlete	Event	Score	Rank	Score	Rank	Score	Rank	Score	Rank
Andreas Benke; Aaron Borck; Pascale Dressler; Carl Frankenstein	Men's group	28.050	5	26.490	5	54.540	6	Did not advance	
Tara Engler; Tia Gazsi; Anna Jesse	Women's group	27.910	4	27.520	5	55.430	4 Q	28.030	4

Trampoline

Germany qualified two athletes at the 2023 Trampoline Gymnastics World Championships.

Athlete	Event	Qualification		Final	
Athlete	Event	Score	Rank	Score	Rank
	Men's synchronized trampoline				
	Women's double mini-trampoline				

== Korfball ==
Germany qualified in korfball at the 2023 IKF World Korfball Championship.

Indoor

Athlete	Event	Group stage				Semi-final	Final / BM	
Athlete	Event	Opposition Score	Opposition Score	Opposition Score	Rank	Opposition Score	Opposition Score	Rank
Team Germany	Korfball	Suriname; L 14–15	Belgium; L 27–14	Czech Republic; L 20–19	4	Portugal; W 20–23	Suriname; L 14–15	6

== Powerlifting ==
Equipped

Athlete	Event	Exercises			Total weight	Total points	Rank
Athlete	Event	Squat	Bench press	Deadlift	Total weight	Total points	Rank
Cathrin Silberzahn	Women's Heavyweight	DSQ					
Valerie Von Gleichen	Women's Super Heavyweight	270.0	75.0	125.0	470.0	73.13	8

== Racquetball ==
Athlete	Event	Round of 16	Quarterfinal	Semifinal	Final / BM	
Athlete	Event	Opposition Result	Opposition Result	Opposition Result	Opposition Result	Rank
Marcel Lunsmann	Men's singles					
Angela Grisar	Women's singles					
Marcel Lunsmann; Angela Grisar	Double					

== Squash ==
Athlete	Event	Round of 32	Round of 16 / CR	Quarterfinals / CQ	Semi-finals / CS	Final / BM / CF	
Athlete	Event	Opposition Score	Opposition Score	Opposition Score	Opposition Score	Opposition Score	Rank
Raphael Kandra	Men's singles	Byrtus (CZE); L 0–3	Classification round Shcherbakov (UKR); W 3–0	Classification round Palomino (COL); L 1–3	Did not advance		=21
Katerina Tycova	Women's singles	Otrzasek (POL); W 0–3	Dominguez (ESP); L 3–0	Classification round Lincou (FRA); W 3–1	Classification round Chukwu (HUN); L 3–2	Did not advance	11
Saskia Beinhard	Women's singles	Zhang (CHN); W 3–0	Vidovic (CRO); W 3–2	Stephan (FRA); L 3–0	Did not advance		=5

== Tug of war ==
Athlete	Event	Group stage						Semi-final	Final / BM	
Athlete	Event	Opposition Score	Opposition Score	Opposition Score	Opposition Score	Opposition Score	Rank	Opposition Score	Opposition Score	Rank
Team Germany	Women's outdoor 500 kg									
Team Germany	Men's outdoor 640 kg									
Team Germany	Mixed outdoor 580 kg									
