= Brazil at the 2025 World Games =

- IOC code: BRA
- NOC: Brazilian Olympic Committee

in Chengdu, China 7 August 2025 – 17 August 2025
- Competitors: 61 (37 men and 24 women) in 11 sports and 30 events
- Medals Ranked 33rd: Gold 2 Silver 0 Bronze 2 Total 4

World Games appearances
- 1981; 1985; 1989; 1993; 1997; 2001; 2005; 2009; 2013; 2017; 2022; 2025

Brazil competed at the 2025 World Games held in Chengdu, China from 7 to 17 August 2025.

Athletes representing Brazil won two gold medals and two bronze medals. The country finished in 33rd place in the medal table.

== Medalists ==
Medal	Name	Sport	Event	Date
Gold	Brazil men's national fistball team: Gabriel Heck; Vinicius Goulart; Álvaro Englert; Gabriel Drumm; Mateus Jung; Thomas Suffert; Mateus D'Agostin; Bruno Arnold; Arthur Holz; Ermínio Goldani	Fistball	Men's tournament	13 August
Gold	Brazil women's national fistball team: Julia Hoberrek; Sabine Suffert; Giovanna Lucchin; Maria Eduarda; Cristiane de Souza; Manuela Zott; Luna Ebert; Bianca Suffert; Cecilia Jaques	Fistball	Women's Tournament	13 August
Bronze	Brazil men's national beach handball team: Cristiano Rossa; Pedro Da Silva; Renan Carvalho; André De Oliveira; Nailson Amaral; Bruno Oliveira; Rai Gonçalves; Ugo Fernandes; Marcelo Tuller; Gustavo Morais	Beach handball	Men's tournament	12 August
Bronze	Marcus Madruga; Mario Oliveira Silva	Ju-jitsu	Mixed duo para mental	12 August

== Competitors ==
The following is the list of number of competitors in the Games.

Sport	Men	Women	Total
Dancesport	2	1	3
Fistball	10	10	20
Gymnastics	1	1	2
Handball	10	0	10
Ju-jitsu	6	1	7
Karate	1	0	1
Kickboxing	2	3	5
Orienteering	4	4	8
Powerlifting	0	1	1
Speed skating	1	0	1
Wushu	1	3	4
Total	37	24	61

== Beach handball ==
Team	Event	Preliminary round				Quarterfinal	Semifinal	Final / BM / PM	
Team	Event	Opposition Result	Opposition Result	Opposition Result	Rank	Opposition Result	Opposition Result	Opposition Result	Rank
Brazil men's	Men's tournament	Portugal; W 1–2	Croatia; W 2–0	Germany; W 1–2	1	China; W 2–0	Germany; L 1–2	Spain; W 1–2	3rd place, bronze medalist(s)

== Fistball ==
Brazil qualified in the men's fistball tournament by finishing at 2023 World Championships and women's fistball tournament by finishing at 2023 South American Championship.

Team	Event	Group Stage				Quarterfinal	Semifinal	Final / BM	
Team	Event	Opposition Score	Opposition Score	Opposition Score	Rank	Opposition Score	Opposition Score	Opposition Score	Rank
Brazil men's	Men's tournament	Germany; W 1–3	Austria; W 0–3	Switzerland; W 3–0	1	—N/a	Switzerland; W 3–0	Germany; W 3–0	1st place, gold medalist(s)
Brazil women's	Women's tournament	Switzerland; W 3–2	Austria; W 3–1	Germany; W 3–1	1	—N/a	Austria; W 3–1	Switzerland; W 3–2	1st place, gold medalist(s)

== Powerlifting ==
Equipped

Athlete	Event	Exercises			Total weight	Total points	Rank
Athlete	Event	Squat	Bench press	Deadlift	Total weight	Total points	Rank
Cicera Tavares	Women's Heavyweight	235.0	132.5	243.0 WR	610.5	105.69	4

== Wushu ==
Brazil qualified one athlete at the 2023 World Wushu Championships.

Athlete	Event	Qualification		Final	
Athlete	Event	Opponent	Result	Opponent	Result
	Women's sanda 52 kg				
