= Hannah Chukwu =

Hungarian squash player (born 2003)

Personal information
- Full name: Hannah Chinyere Chukwu
- Born: 7 July 2003 (age 23) Komárom, Hungary

Sport
- Country: Hungary
- Turned pro: 2019
- Coached by: Janos Farkas
- Retired: Active
- Racquet used: Harrow

Women's singles
- Highest ranking: No. 83 (February 2022)
- Current ranking: No. 83 (February 2022)
- Updated on February 2022

Hannah Chinyere Chukwu (born 7 July 2003) is a Hungarian professional squash player. As of February 2022, she was ranked number 83 in the world.

She secured the Hungarian no. 1 ranking before the age of 18.
