= Czech Republic at the 2025 World Games =

- IOC code: CZE
- NOC: Czech Olympic Committee

in Chengdu, China August 2025 – August 2025
- Competitors: 145 (83 men and 62 women) in 15 sports and 46 events
- Medals Ranked 25th: Gold 3 Silver 4 Bronze 2 Total 9

World Games appearances
- 1981; 1985; 1989; 1993; 1997; 2001; 2005; 2009; 2013; 2017; 2022; 2025

Czech Republic competed at the 2025 World Games held in Chengdu, China from 7 to 17 August 2025. Athletes representing Czech Republic won three gold medals, four silver medals and twp bronze medals. The country finished in 25th place in the medal table.

== Medalists ==
Medal	Name	Sport	Event	Date
Gold	Lukáš Záhorský; Eliška Matoušková	Powerboating	Mixed Nations Cup	17 August
Gold	Lukáš Záhorský	Powerboating	Men's single motosurf	17 August
Gold	Eliška Matoušková	Powerboating	Women's single motosurf	17 August
Silver	Tomáš Křivda	Orienteering	Men's sprint	10 August
Silver	Czech Republic men: Jakub Cik; Mikuláš Zbořil; Pavel Strýček; Jakub Bernad; Petr Školoud; Jan Andrýsek; Jiří Matoušek; Daniel Brabec; Patrik Šebek; Jan Vyoral; Marek Loskot; Mikuláš Skoupý; Jakub Novák; Lukáš Novák	Inline hockey	Men's tournament	11 August
Silver	Jaroslav Chum	Parkour	Men's speed	13 August
Silver	Klára Strnadová	Kickboxing	Women's K1 52 kg	14 August
Bronze	Tomáš Křivda; Jakub Glonek; Tereza Rauturier; Denisa Králová	Orienteering	Mixed sprint relay	11 August
Bronze	Czech Republic men: Lukáš Punčochář; Filip Zakonov; Adam Hemerka; Adam Zubek; Marek Beneš; Matěj Havlas; Ondřej Němeček; Tomáš Hanák; Tomáš Jurco; Jakub Buršík; Adam Delong; Filip Langer; Josef Rýpar; Lukáš Bauer	Floorball	Men's tournament	13 August

== Competitors ==
The following is the list of number of competitors in the Games.

Sport	Men	Women	Total
Air sports	1	0	1
Baseball	15	0	15
Canoe dragon boat	11	11	22
Canoe marathon	2	2	4
Dancesport	2	2	4
Floorball	14	14	28
Flying disc	7	7	14
Gymnastics	1	3	4
Inline hockey	14	0	14
Kickboxing	0	1	1
Korfball	7	7	14
Lacrosse	0	12	12
Orienteering	4	4	8
Powerboating	2	2	4
Road speed skating	1	1	2
Squash	2	2	4
Triathlon	0	1	1
Total	83	62	145

== Floorball ==
Summary

Team	Event	Preliminary round				Semifinal	Final / BM / PF	
Team	Event	Opposition Result	Opposition Result	Opposition Result	Rank	Opposition Result	Opposition Result	Rank
Czech Republic men	Men's tournament	Canada; W 29–1	China; W 36–0	Finland; L 8–2	2	Sweden; L 5–4	Switzerland; W 7–2	3rd place, bronze medalist(s)
Czech Republic women	Women's tournament	Singapore; W 21–0	Canada; W 16–0	Finland; L 3–2	2	Sweden; L 3–1	Switzerland; L 3–4	4

== Gymnastics ==
=== Parkour ===
Men

Athlete	Event	Qualification		Final	
Athlete	Event	Result	Rank	Result	Rank
Jaroslav Chum	Men's speed	26.27	1 Q	25.83	2nd place, silver medalist(s)
Jaroslav Chum	Men's freestyle	DNF			

== Inline hockey ==
Summary

Team	Event	Group stage				Semifinal	Final / BM	
Team	Event	Opposition Score	Opposition Score	Opposition Score	Rank	Opposition Score	Opposition Score	Rank
Czech Republic men	Men's tournament	France; W 2–1	Argentina; W 0–7	Italy; W 3–2	1	Namibia; W 3–1	United States; L 4–3	2nd place, silver medalist(s)

== Korfball ==
Czechia qualified in korfball at the 2023 IKF World Korfball Championship.

Indoor

Athlete	Event	Group stage				Semi-final	Final / BM	
Athlete	Event	Opposition Score	Opposition Score	Opposition Score	Rank	Opposition Score	Opposition Score	Rank
Team Czech Republic	Korfball	Belgium; L 26-10	Suriname; W 19-16	Germany; W 20-19	2	Netherlands; L 39-13	Chinese Taipei; L 15-19	4

== Lacrosse ==
Czechia's women lacrosse team qualified.

Summary

Team	Event	Preliminary round				5th place play-off	
Team	Event	Opposition Result	Opposition Result	Opposition Result	Rank	Opposition Result	Rank
Czech Republic women	Women's tournament	Australia; L 10–23	Ireland; W 16–10	United States; L 8–32	3	Great Britain; L 11–20	6

== Softball ==
Men

Team	Event	Group play				5th-8th Classification	Fifth place play-off	
Team	Event	Opposition Result	Opposition Result	Opposition Result	Rank	Opposition Result	Opposition Result	Rank
Czech Republic men	Men's tournament	Argentina (ARG) L 0–7	Japan (JPN) L 2–8	Venezuela (VEN) L 11–1	4	Singapore (SGP) W 15–10	Argentina (ARG) L 0–3	6

== Squash ==
Athlete	Event	Round of 32	Round of 16 / CR	Quarterfinals / CQ	Semi-finals / CS	Final / BM / CF	
Athlete	Event	Opposition Score	Opposition Score	Opposition Score	Opposition Score	Opposition Score	Rank
Jakub Solnicky	Men's singles	J. Franco (GUA); L 3–2	Classification round Krysiak (POL); W 3–0	Classification round Kegel (CRO); W 1–3	Classification round Adekoge (NGR); L 2–3	Did not advance	=19
Viktor Byrtus	Men's singles	Kandra (GER); W 0–3	van Niekerk (RSA); W 3–1	Farkas (HUN); L 0–3	Did not advance		=5
Karolina Sramkova	Women's singles	Allinckx (SUI); L 3–0	Classification round Xu (CHN); W 3–0	Classification round Peychar (AUT); L 3–2	Did not advance		=21
Michaela Cepova	Women's singles	Tyma (POL); L 0–3	Classification round Zhang (CHN); W 0–3	Classification round Bushma (UKR); L 0–3	Did not advance		=21
