= Ukraine at the 2025 World Games =

- IOC code: UKR
- NOC: National Olympic Committee of Ukraine

in Chengdu, China 7 August 2025 – 17 August 2025
- Competitors: 60 (33 men and 27 women) in 13 sports
- Medals Ranked 3rd: Gold 16 Silver 14 Bronze 14 Total 44

World Games appearances (overview)
- 1993; 1997; 2001; 2005; 2009; 2013; 2017; 2022; 2025

Ukraine competed at the 2025 World Games held in Chengdu, China from 7 to 17 August 2025. Ukraine ranked third in the medal tally (behind China and Germany) with 16 gold medals, 14 silver medals and 14 bronze medals.

== Competitors ==
Ukrainians did not compete in air sports, archery, beach handball, beach and indoor korfball, billiard sports, boules sports, canoe polo, disc golf, duathlon, fistball, flag football, floorball, inline hockey, lacrosse, lifesaving, parkour, powerboating, racquetball, roller sports, softball, tug of war. The following is the list of number of competitors in the Games.

Sport	Men	Women	Total
Acrobatic gymnastics	7	6	13
Aerobic gymnastics	1	1	2
Canoe marathon	1	0	1
Cheerleading	—	2	2
Dancesport	3	4	7
Dragon boat	6	6	12
Finswimming	5	7	12
Freediving	0	1	1
Ju-jitsu	2	0	2
Karate	3	1	4
Kickboxing	2	2	4
Muaythai	2	1	3
Orienteering	1	1	2
Sambo	5	2	7
Sport climbing	4	0	4
Squash	1	1	2
Trampoline gymnastics	3	1	4
Wakeboarding	1	1	2
Wushu	1	1	2
Total	48	38	88

== Medalists ==
Medal	Name	Sport	Event	Date
Gold	Yevfrosyniia Kryvytska; Ivan Labunets	Acrobatic gymnastics	Mixed pairs	August 8
Gold	Ryzvan Talibov	Karate	Men's kumite +84 kg	August 9
Gold	Mixed	Dragon boat	Open 8-seater 500 metres	August 10
Gold	Mixed	Dragon boat	Mixed 10-seater 2000 metre	August 10
Gold	Sofiia Hrechko	Finswimming	Women's 200 metre surface	August 10
Gold	Bohdan Mochulskyi	Ju-jitsu	Men's fighting 62 kg	August 10
Gold	Dmytro Shelesko	Muaythai	Men's 57 kg	August 10
Gold	Sofiia Hrechko	Finswimming	Women's 400 metre surface	August 11
Gold	Andrii Kucherenko	Sambo	Men's 71 kg	August 13
Gold	Vladyslav Rudniev	Sambo	Men's 79 kg	August 13
Gold	Petro Davydenko	Sambo	Men's 88 kg	August 13
Gold	Hlib Mazur	Kickboxing	Women's K1 style 63.5 kg	August 14
Gold	Roman Shcherbatiuk	Kickboxing	Women's K1 style +91 kg	August 14
Gold	Oleksandr Voropaiev; Andrii Kucherenko; Vladyslav Rudniev; Petro Davydenko; Anatolii Voloshynov	Sambo	Men's team	August 14
Gold	Anatolii Novopysmennyi	Powerlifting	Men's classic heavyweight	August 15
Gold	Konstiantyn Musiienko	Powerlifting	Men's equipped heavyweight	August 17
Silver	Anzhelika Terliuga	Karate	Women's kumite 55 kg	August 8
Silver	Ruzanna Vecheruk; Anhelina Cherniavska	Acrobatic gymnastics	Women's pairs	August 8
Silver	Mixed	Dragon boat	Mixed 10-seater 500 metres	August 10
Silver	Sofiia Sokolova	Wakesurfing	Women's skim	August 10
Silver	Yurii Push; Taras Yarush; Stanislav Kukurudz; Yuriy Savka	Acrobatic gymnastics	Men's groups	August 10
Silver	Oleksii Zakharov	Finswimming	Men's 400 m surface	August 10
Silver	Serhii Smishchenko; Oleksandr Kuzmenko; Davyd Yelisieiev; Oleksii Zakharov	Finswimming	Men's 4 × 50 m surface relay	August 10
Silver	Anna Yakovleva	Finswimming	Women's 400 metre surface	August 11
Silver	Serhii Smishchenko; Oleksandr Kuzmenko; Davyd Yelisieiev; Oleksii Zakharov	Finswimming	Men's 4 × 100 m surface relay	August 11
Silver	Vitalii Kolomiiets	Powerlifting	Men's equipped middleweight	August 16
Silver	Tetiana Bila	Powerlifting	Women's equipped lightweight	August 16
Silver	Larysa Soloviova	Powerlifting	Women's equipped middleweight	August 16
Silver	Volodymyr Rysiev	Powerlifting	Men's equipped heavyweight	August 17
Silver	Daria Rusanenko	Powerlifting	Women's equipped super heavyweight	August 17
Bronze	Mixed	Dragon boat	Mixed 10-seater 200 metres	August 10
Bronze	Yelyzaveta Hrechykhina; Sofiia Hrechko; Viktoriia Uvarova; Anastasiia Makarenko	Finswimming	Women's 4 × 100 m surface relay	August 10
Bronze	Artur Artamonov	Finswimming	Men's 50 metre bi-fins	August 11
Bronze	Sofiya Lamakh	Finswimming	Women's 100 metre bi-fins	August 11
Bronze	Anastasiia Makarenko	Finswimming	Women's 100 metre surface	August 11
Bronze	Yelyzaveta Hrechykhina; Sofiia Hrechko; Viktoriia Uvarova; Anastasiia Makarenko	Finswimming	Women's 4 × 50 m surface relay	August 11
Bronze	Daryna Ivanova	Kickboxing	Women's K1 style 52 kg	August 14
Bronze	Alina Martyniuk	Kickboxing	Women's K1 style 60 kg	August 14
Bronze	Oleksandr Voropaiev	Sambo	Men's 64 kg	August 14
Bronze	Anhelina Lysenko; Yevheniia Pozdnia	Sambo	Women's team	August 14
Bronze	Anastasiia Kurashvili; Stanislav Halaida	Aerobic gymnastics	Mixed pairs	August 15
Bronze	Mykola Barannik	Powerlifting	Men's equipped middleweight	August 16
Bronze	Anastasiia Derevianko	Powerlifting	Women's equipped lightweight	August 16
Bronze	Oleksii Bychkov	Powerlifting	Men's equipped super heavyweight	August 17

Medals by sport
Sport	1st place, gold medalist(s)	2nd place, silver medalist(s)	3rd place, bronze medalist(s)	Total
Sambo	4	0	2	6
Powerlifting	2	5	3	10
Finswimming	2	4	5	11
Dragon boat	2	1	1	4
Kickboxing	2	0	2	4
Acrobatic gymnastics	1	2	0	3
Karate	1	1	0	2
Ju-jitsu	1	0	0	1
Muaythai	1	0	0	1
Wakeboarding	0	1	0	1
Aerobic gymnastics	0	0	1	1
Total	16	14	14	44

== Acrobatic gymnastics ==
Ukraine qualified athletes through the 2024 Acrobatic Gymnastics World Championships. The team was the biggest one at the Games, competed in all events and became the most successful one, as well. Push, Yarush, Kukurudz, and Savka won their second consecutive medal. It were third Games for Push, Yarush, and Kukurudz.

Athletes	Event	Qualification						Final	
Athletes	Event	Balance exercise		Dynamic exercise		Total		Final exercise	
Athletes	Event	Result	Rank	Result	Rank	Result	Rank	Result	Rank
Sofronii Davydenko; Ivan Horlach	Men's pairs	26.660	6	24.580	6	51.240	6	Did not advance	
Yurii Push; Taras Yarush; Stanislav Kukurudz; Yuriy Savka	Men's groups	28.640	2	28.120	3	56.760	3 Q	28.860	2nd place, silver medalist(s)
Anhelina Cherniavska; Ruzanna Vecheruk	Women's pairs	27.600	2	27.760	1	55.360	2 Q	28.270	2nd place, silver medalist(s)
Elina Kozachanska; Karina Ostrovska; Alina Puhach	Women's group	26.480	5	27.550	4	54.030	5 r	Did not advance	
Yevfrosyniia Kryvytska; Ivan Labunets	Mixed pairs	29.340	1	29.380	1	57.720	1 Q	29.110	1st place, gold medalist(s)

== Aerobic gymnastics ==
Ukraine qualified athletes through the 2024 Aerobic Gymnastics World Championships. Ukraine won its first ever medal in aerobics.

Kurashvili and Halaida competed at the 2022 Games, although in another event.

Athlete	Event	Qualification		Final	
Athlete	Event	Result	Rank	Result	Rank
Anastasiia Kurashvili; Stanislav Halaida	Pairs	18.900	4 Q	18.900	3rd place, bronze medalist(s)

== Canoe marathon ==
Canoe marathon

Athlete	Event	Heats		Final	
Athlete	Event	Result	Rank	Result	Rank
Maksym Redko	Men's short distance	15:27.68	8	Did not advance	
Maksym Redko	Men's long distance	—N/a		1:42:00.69	14

== Cheerleading ==
Athlete	Event	Semifinal round 1		Semifinal round 2		Semifinal total		Final	
Athlete	Event	Result	Rank	Result	Rank	Result	Rank	Result	Rank
Anastasiia Maloshenko; Yelyzaveta Tymofieieva	Mixed pom	83.210	5	83.360	5	83.300	5 Q	84.140	5

== Dancesport ==
Standard

Athletes	Event	First round							Semi-finals							Finals						
Athletes	Event	Waltz	Tango	Viennese Waltz	Slow Foxtrot	Quickstep	Total points	Rank	Waltz	Tango	Viennese Waltz	Slow Foxtrot	Quickstep	Total points	Rank	Waltz	Tango	Viennese Waltz	Slow Foxtrot	Quickstep	Total points	Rank
Anna Lubianetska; Emanuele Cannistraro	Standard	34.00	34.17	34.08	34.33	33.92	170.50	13 Q	34.00	34.00	33.67	33.83	33.58	169.08	14	Did not advance						
Veronika Myshko; Earle Williamson	Standard	32.75	32.58	32.55	32.58	32.92	163.39	21	Did not advance													

Breaking

Athlete	Nickname	Event	Round robin				Quarterfinal	Semifinal	Final / BM	
Athlete	Nickname	Event	Opposition Result	Opposition Result	Opposition Result	Rank	Opposition Result	Opposition Result	Opposition Result	Rank
Oleg Kuznietsov	Kuzya	B-Boys	Lithe-Ing (CHN); L 0–2	Cis (BEL); W 2–0	Xak (ESP); W 2–0	2 Q	Issin (JPN); L 0–2	Did not advance		
Kateryna Pavlenko	Kate	B-Girls	Mini Japa (BRA); W 2–0	Ayumi (JPN); T 1–1	Anti (ITA); L 0–2	3	Did not advance			
Anna Ponomarenko	Stefani	B-Girls	Alessandrina (ITA); W 2–0	India (NED); L 0–2	Syssy (FRA); L 0–2	3	Did not advance			

== Dragon boat ==
Ukraine have qualified a berth in the 2025 World Games through its performance in the mixed 10-seater races at the 2024 ICF Dragon Boat World Championships. Ukraine had participated in both previous events (2005 and 2009). This time, the Ukrainian team won its first medals in the sport and became second most successful team at the Games behind Indonesia.

Athlete	Event	Heats		Semifinals		Final	
Athlete	Event	Result	Rank	Result	Rank	Result	Rank
Olesia Matviienko; Yurii Bardashevskyi; Serhii Semeniuk; Oleksandr Kalmus; Danylo Kukharuk; Mykola Verkhovetskyi; Olha Buraho; Viktor Svyrydiuk; Kateryna Petrenko; Olena Skvortsova	Open 8-seater 200 metres	1:10.78	4 q SF	49.20	2 Q	47.39	5
Olesia Matviienko; Yurii Bardashevskyi; Serhii Semeniuk; Oleksandr Kalmus; Danylo Kukharuk; Mykola Verkhovetskyi; Olha Buraho; Viktor Svyrydiuk; Kateryna Petrenko; Olena Skvortsova	Open 8-seater 500 metres	2:07.76	2 Q F	Bye		2:05.53	1st place, gold medalist(s)
Olesia Matviienko; Yurii Bardashevskyi; Serhii Semeniuk; Oleksandr Kalmus; Danylo Kukharuk; Mykola Verkhovetskyi; Olha Buraho; Viktor Svyrydiuk; Kateryna Petrenko; Olena Skvortsova	Open 8-seater 2000 metres	—N/a				9:28.25	4
Olesia Matviienko; Yurii Bardashevskyi; Serhii Semeniuk; Oleksandr Kalmus; Danylo Kukharuk; Mykola Verkhovetskyi; Olha Buraho; Viktor Svyrydiuk; Kateryna Petrenko; Olena Skvortsova; Anastasiia Mazurenko; Snizhana Zhyhailo	Mixed 10-seater 200 metres	49.98	2 Q F	Bye		48.85	3rd place, bronze medalist(s)
Olesia Matviienko; Yurii Bardashevskyi; Serhii Semeniuk; Oleksandr Kalmus; Danylo Kukharuk; Mykola Verkhovetskyi; Olha Buraho; Viktor Svyrydiuk; Kateryna Petrenko; Olena Skvortsova; Anastasiia Mazurenko; Snizhana Zhyhailo	Mixed 10-seater 500 metres	2:08.32	2 Q F	Bye		2:07.02	2nd place, silver medalist(s)
Olesia Matviienko; Yurii Bardashevskyi; Serhii Semeniuk; Oleksandr Kalmus; Danylo Kukharuk; Mykola Verkhovetskyi; Olha Buraho; Viktor Svyrydiuk; Kateryna Petrenko; Olena Skvortsova; Anastasiia Mazurenko; Snizhana Zhyhailo	Mixed 10-seater 2000 metres	—N/a				9:19.87	1st place, gold medalist(s)

== Finswimming ==
Ukraine was the biggest team at the Games and became most successful in terms of number of medals, finishing 3rd in the medal tally.

Sofiia Hrechko defended her title in 200 m surface from 2022. Smishchenko, Zakharov, Uvarova, Hrechko, Makarenko, Tymoshenko competed at their second Games.

Athlete	Event	Time	Rank
Artur Artamonov	Men's 50 m bi-fins	18.83	3rd place, bronze medalist(s)
Artur Artamonov	Men's 100 m bi-fins	42.10	8
Oleksii Zakharov	Men's 200 m surface	1:22.95	7
Oleksii Zakharov	Men's 400 m surface	2:57.03	2nd place, silver medalist(s)
Serhii Smishchenko; Oleksandr Kuzmenko; Davyd Yelisieiev; Oleksii Zakharov	Men's 4 × 50 metre surface relay	1:00.26	2nd place, silver medalist(s)
Serhii Smishchenko; Oleksandr Kuzmenko; Davyd Yelisieiev; Oleksii Zakharov	Men's 4 × 100 metre surface relay	2:18.73	2nd place, silver medalist(s)
Viktoriia Uvarova	Women's 50 m apnoea	16.57	6
Viktoriia Uvarova	Women's 100 m surface	39.64	4
Viktoriia Uvarova	Women's 200 m surface	1:34.00	7
Sofiia Hrechko	Women's 200 metre surface	1:27.90	1st place, gold medalist(s)
Sofiia Hrechko	Women's 400 m surface	3:11.88 WR	1st place, gold medalist(s)
Anna Yakovleva	Women's 400 m surface	3:12.27	2nd place, silver medalist(s)
Sofiya Lamakh	Women's 100 m bi-fins	47.87	3rd place, bronze medalist(s)
Yevheniia Tymoshenko	Women's 100 m bi-fins	48.23	6
Anastasiia Makarenko	Women's 100 m surface	39.14	3rd place, bronze medalist(s)
Yelyzaveta Hrechykhina; Sofiia Hrechko; Viktoriia Uvarova; Anastasiia Makarenko	Women's 4 × 50 metre surface relay	1:10.06	3rd place, bronze medalist(s)
Yelyzaveta Hrechykhina; Sofiia Hrechko; Viktoriia Uvarova; Anastasiia Makarenko	Women's 4 × 100 metre surface relay	2:36.82	3rd place, bronze medalist(s)

== Freediving ==
Ukraine qualified one athlete.

Athlete	Event	Meters	Rank
Kateryna Sadurska	Women's Dynamic no Fins	DSQ	
Kateryna Sadurska	Women's Dynamic with Fins	209.0	9

== Ju-jitsu ==
Bohdan Mochulskyi won his third gold medal in his third appearance at the Games.

Men

Athlete	Event	Group stage			Semifinals	Final/Bronze medal bout	
Athlete	Event	Opposition Result	Opposition Result	Rank	Opposition Result	Opposition Result	Rank
Bohdan Mochulskyi	62 kg	al-Gharrawi (IRQ); W 50–0 DSQ	Kanatbek (KAZ); W 16–7	1 Q	Viviescas (COL); W 13–11	van der Veer (NED); W 17–12	1st place, gold medalist(s)
Kostiantyn Shutko	69 kg ne-waza	Batyrbekov (KAZ); L 2–4	Bayili (BEL); L 0–2	3	Did not advance		

== Karate ==
Zaplitnyi, Chobotar, and Terliuga qualified as medallists of the 2023 World Karate Championships, while Talibov qualified through the ranking. Terliuga competed at her second Games and won her second medal. Talibov competed at his second Games (in 2022, he finished 4th).

In the semifinal, China's Wei was declared winner with score 9–1. However, the Ukrainian team filed a protest, claiming that Wei had violated the line at some point during the bout. This protest was upheld, and Terliuga subsequently won the semifinal.

Men

Athlete	Event	Group stage				Semifinals	Final/Bronze medal bout	
Athlete	Event	Opposition Result	Opposition Result	Opposition Result	Rank	Opposition Result	Opposition Result	Rank
Andrii Zaplitnyi	75 kg	Sakiyama (JPN); L 0–1	Berthon (FRA); W 1–0	Xu (CHN); L 0–2	4	Did not advance		
Valerii Chobotar	84 kg	Shimada (JPN); L 0–3	Gasparian (AIN); W 4–0	Duan (CHN); L 6–12	3	Did not advance		
Ryzvan Talibov	+84 kg	Timmermans (ARU); W 6–2	Filali (FRA); W 5–3	Kvesić (CRO); W 3–0	1 Q	Abazari (IRI); W 4–0	Kvesić (CRO); W 4–0	1st place, gold medalist(s)

Women

Athlete	Event	Group stage				Semifinals	Final/Bronze medal bout	
Athlete	Event	Opposition Result	Opposition Result	Opposition Result	Rank	Opposition Result	Opposition Result	Rank
Anzhelika Terliuga	55 kg	Yakan (TUR); W 0–0 KI	Toro (CHI); L 0–5	No other competitor	2 Q	Wei (CHN); W 4–3	Bitsch (GER); L 1–3	2nd place, silver medalist(s)

== Kickboxing ==
Ukraine qualified athletes through the 2024 European Championships. Ukrainians competed in K1 style only. The team finished 2nd in the medal tally behind Israel but became the most successful in terms of number of medals. Shcherbatiuk, Ivanova, and Martyniuk won their second consecutive medal at the World Games.

Men

Athlete	Event	Quarterfinals	Semi-finals	Final/Bronze medal bout	
Athlete	Event	Opposition Result	Opposition Result	Opposition Result	Rank
Hlib Mazur	63.5 kg	Mestrinier (BRA); W 1–1 KO	Kongtook (THA); W 2–1	Guliyev (AZE); W 3–0	1st place, gold medalist(s)
Roman Shcherbatiuk	+91 kg	Abdelhady Abdelsalam (EGY); W 3–0	Coulibaly (FRA); W 3–0	Ozer (TUR)	1st place, gold medalist(s)

Women

Athlete	Event	Quarterfinals	Semi-finals	Final/Bronze medal bout	
Athlete	Event	Opposition Result	Opposition Result	Opposition Result	Rank
Daryna Ivanova	52 kg	Geng (CHN); W 3–0	Sachkov (ISR); L 0–3	Azizoglu (TUR); W 3–0	3rd place, bronze medalist(s)
Alina Martyniuk	60 kg	Xu (CHN); W 3–0	Bickel (NED); L 0–3	Ndapataka (INA); W 3–0	3rd place, bronze medalist(s)

== Muaythai ==
Together with Turkey and United States, Ukrainian team was second largest team behind host China. Oleksandr Yefimenko took part in the Games for the second time.

Men

Athlete	Event	Quarterfinals	Semifinals	Final/Bronze medal bout	
Athlete	Event	Opposition Result	Opposition Result	Opposition Result	Rank
Dmytro Shelesko	57 kg	Mosawi (AFG); W 29–28	Nguyễn Trần (VIE); W 29–28	Gordon (ISR); W 30–287	1st place, gold medalist(s)
Oleksandr Yefimenko	71 kg	Zahidi (MAR); W 29–28	Franzosi (ITA); L RSCB	Spéth (HUN); L 28–29	4

Women

Athlete	Event	Quarterfinals	Semi-finals	Final/Bronze medal bout	
Athlete	Event	Opposition Result	Opposition Result	Opposition Result	Rank
Anastasiia Mykhailenko	48 kg	Abubakar (PHI); L 27–30	Did not advance		

== Orienteering ==
Ukraine did not compete in the mixed relay. Olena Babych competed at her second consecutive Games.

Men

Athlete	Event	Time	Rank
Illia Otreshko	Sprint	17:35	23
Illia Otreshko	Middle distance	1:05:45	22

Women

Athlete	Event	Time	Rank
Olena Babych	Sprint	20:49	34
Olena Babych	Middle distance	55:14	16

== Powerlifting ==
Classic

Athlete	Event	Exercises			Total weight	Total points	Rank
Athlete	Event	Squat	Bench press	Deadlift	Total weight	Total points	Rank
Anatolii Novopysmennyi	Men's heavyweight	362.5	230.0	345.0	937.5	119.41	1st place, gold medalist(s)
Taras Melnychuk	Men's super heavyweight	347.5	230.0	355.0	932.5	109.79	4

Equipped

Athlete	Event	Exercises			Total weight	Total points	Rank
Athlete	Event	Squat	Bench press	Deadlift	Total weight	Total points	Rank
Oleksii Bychkov	Men's Super heavyweight	400.0	340.0	370.0	1110.0	107.41	3rd place, bronze medalist(s)
Andrii Shevchenko	Men's Super heavyweight	460.0	350.0	370.0	1180.0	103.97	5 GR
Musiienko Kostiantyn	Men's heavyweight	390.0	330.0	320.0	1040.0	113.19	(gold) GR
Volodymyr Rysiev	Men's heavyweight	387.5	315.0	327.5	1030.0	110.63	2nd place, silver medalist(s)
Vitalii Kolomiiets	Men's middleweight	360.0	255.0	310.0	925.0	107.36	2nd place, silver medalist(s)
Mykola Barannik	Men's middleweight	345.0	260.0	302.5	907.5	105.39	3rd place, bronze medalist(s)
Tetianna Bila	Women's lightweight	207.5	130.0	175.0	512.5	107.77	2nd place, silver medalist(s)
Anastasiia Derevianko	Women's lightweight	205.0	127.5	180.0	512.5	105.45	3rd place, bronze medalist(s)
Larysa Soloviova	Women's middleweight	235.0	170.0	217.5	622.5	112.72	2nd place, silver medalist(s)
Daria Rusanenko	Women's Super Heavyweight	285.5 WR	167.5	217.5	670.5	108.98	2nd place, silver medalist(s)
Valentyna Zahoruiko	Women's Super Heavyweight	280.0	170.0	230.0	680.0	100.48	5

== Sambo ==
Ukraine was the fourth largest team in the sport and one of the two that qualified athletes in all men's categories. Ukraine won its first World Games medals in the sport. The team topped the medal tally.

Men

Athlete	Event	Quarterfinals	Semi-finals	Final/Bronze medal bout	
Athlete	Event	Opposition Result	Opposition Result	Opposition Result	Rank
Oleksandr Voropaiev	64 kg	Nersesyan (ARM); W 1–0	Khabibulaev (AIN); L 0–4	Barakanov (KGZ); W 0–0	3rd place, bronze medalist(s)
Andrii Kucherenko	71 kg	Župarić (SRB); W 8–0	Toleukhan (KAZ); W 1–0	Zinnatov (AIN); W 6–1	1st place, gold medalist(s)
Vladyslav Rudniev	79 kg	Contreras (COL); W 8–0	Kushaev (UZB); W 8–0	Abgarian (AIN); W 3–0	1st place, gold medalist(s)
Petro Davydenko	88 kg	Tergeubekov (KAZ); W 10–0	Erkebai Uulu (KGZ); W 8–0	Alikhanov (AIN); W 4–1	1st place, gold medalist(s)
Anatolii Voloshynov	98 kg	Avanesyan (ARM); L 0–2	Did not advance		
Oleksandr Voropaiev; Andrii Kucherenko; Vladyslav Rudniev; Petro Davydenko; Anatolii Voloshynov	Men's team	Kyrgyzstan w/o	Uzbekistan; W 2–0	Kazakhstan; W 2–0	1st place, gold medalist(s)

Women

Athlete	Event	Quarterfinals	Semi-finals	Final/Bronze medal bout	
Athlete	Event	Opposition Result	Opposition Result	Opposition Result	Rank
Yevheniia Pozdnia	65 kg	Akzhigitova (KAZ); L 0–1	Did not advance		
Anhelina Lysenko	72 kg	Kenessary (KAZ); L 0–1	Did not advance		
Anhelina Lysenko; Yevheniia Pozdnia	Women's team	Venezuela w/o	Uzbekistan; L 0–2	Egypt; W 2–1	3rd place, bronze medalist(s)

== Sport climbing ==
Yaroslav Tkach competed at his second consecutive Games.

Speed single

Athlete	Event	Qualification		Round of 16	Quarterfinals	Semi-finals	Final/Bronze medal bout	
Athlete	Event	Result	Rank	Opposition Result	Opposition Result	Opposition Result	Opposition Result	Rank
Yaroslav Tkach	Men's	5.02	3 Q	Zurloni (ITA); W 5.07–5.20	Watson (USA); L 5.78–4.87	Did not advance		
Hryhorii Ilchyshyn	Men's	5.36	17	Did not advance				
Kostiantyn Pavlenko	Men's	5.72	25	Did not advance				
Denys Mozolevych	Men's	6.03	26	Did not advance				

Speed single 4

Athlete	Event	Qualification		Elimination heat		Quarterfinals		Semi-finals		Final	
Athlete	Event	Result	Rank	Result	Rank	Result	Rank	Result	Rank	Result	Rank
Yaroslav Tkach	Men's	5.09	9 q EH	Fall		Did not advance					
Hryhorii Ilchyshyn	Men's	5.18	10 q EH	5.64	4	Did not advance					
Kostiantyn Pavlenko	Men's	5.59	29	Did not advance							
Denys Mozolevych	Men's	5.45	27	Did not advance							

Speed relay

Athlete	Event	Qualification		Round of 16	Quarterfinals	Semi-finals	Final/Bronze medal bout	
Athlete	Event	Result	Rank	Opposition Result	Opposition Result	Opposition Result	Opposition Result	Rank
Yaroslav Tkach; Hryhorii Ilchyshyn	Men's	10.68	4 Q	Kazakhstan 1 L 12.85–11.11	Did not advance			
Kostiantyn Pavlenko; Denys Mozolevych	Men's	11.43	12 Q	Indonesia 2 L 10.95–11.82	Did not advance			

== Squash ==
Dmytro Scherbakov competed at his second consecutive Games. Alina Bushma made a comeback after the 2017 Games.

Athlete	Event	Round of 32	Round of 16	Quarterfinals	Semi-finals	Final / BM	
Athlete	Event	Opposition Score	Opposition Score	Opposition Score	Opposition Score	Opposition Score	Rank
Dmytro Shcherbakov	Men's singles	van Niekerk (RSA); L 0–3	Kandra (GER); L 0–3	Haizhen (CHN); W 3–0	Lutz (AUT); W 3–2	Krysiak (POL); W 3–1	25
Alina Bushma	Women's singles	Vidović (CRO); L 2–3	Zhang (CHN); W 3–0	Čepová (CZE); W 3–0	Barbeau (FRA); W 3–0	Bautista (COL); L 2–3	18

== Trampoline gymnastics ==
Ukraine qualified athletes at the 2023 Trampoline Gymnastics World Championships.

Athlete	Event	Qualification		Semifinal		Final	
Athlete	Event	Score	Rank	Score	Rank	Score	Rank
Davyd Sandomyrskyi; Andrii Sokolov	Men's synchronised	23.310	8	Did not advance			
Timofii Chervonnyi	Men's tumbling	40.200	8	Did not advance			
Diana Denysova	Women's tumbling	37.500	7	Did not advance			

== Wakeboarding ==
Athletes	Event	Heats		Last chance qualifiers		Semi-final		Final	
Athletes	Event	Result	Rank	Result	Rank	Result	Rank	Result	Rank
Chubaka Chuba	Men's skim	30.00	3 Q	Bye		25.00	5	Did not advance	
Sonya Sokolova	Women's skim	66.67	2 Q	Bye		39.00	3 Q	50.00	2nd place, silver medalist(s)

== Wushu ==
Ukraine qualified two athletes, one in taolu and one in sanda.

Taolu

Athlete	Event	First routine		Second routine		Final score	
Athlete	Event	Result	Rank	Result	Rank	Result	Rank
Oryna Ivanova	Women's taijiquan and taijijian combined	9.690	4	8.883	9	18.573	9

Sanda

Athlete	Event	Quarterfinals	Semifinals	Final/Bronze medal bout	
Athlete	Event	Opposition Result	Opposition Result	Opposition Result	Rank
Volodymyr Shevchenko	85 kg	Bye	Wahdan (EGY); L 0–2	Fandino (ESP); L 0–2	4
