= Individual Neutral Athletes at the 2025 World Games =

Name used for Russian and Belarusian athletes at the 2025 World Games

- IOC code: AIN

in Chengdu, China 7 August 2025 – 17 August 2025
- Competitors: 33 (14 men and 19 women) in 9 sports
- Medals: Gold 5 Silver 6 Bronze 5 Total 16

World Games appearances
- 2025

Other related appearances
- Soviet Union (1989); Russia (1993–2017); Belarus (1993–2017)

Individual Neutral Athletes from Russia and Belarus competed at the 2025 World Games held in Chengdu, China from 7 to 17 August 2025.

Russia and Belarus are barred from taking part in the World Games due to their role in the Russian invasion of Ukraine. Instead athletes from the two countries will compete as independents, provided that the individual international sports federations allow their participation.

== Medalists ==
Medal	Name	Sport	Event	Date
Gold	Diana Sliseva	Finswimming	Women's 50 m apnoea	10 August
Gold	Konstantin Shakhtarin	Muaythai	Men's 71 kg	10 August
Gold	Diana Sliseva	Finswimming	Women's 100 m surface	11 August
Gold	Sofia Istomina	Sambo	Women's 65 kg	13 August
Gold	Sheikh-Mansur Khabibulaev	Sambo	Men's 64 kg	14 August
Silver	Alexander Kusakin	Freediving	Men's dynamic no fins FFS3-FFS4	10 August
Silver	Alexey Molchanov	Freediving	Men's dynamic with fins	11 August
Silver	Rolan Zinnatov	Sambo	Men's 71 kg	13 August
Silver	Ovanes Abgarian	Sambo	Men's 79 kg	13 August
Silver	Abusupiyan Alikhanov	Sambo	Men's 88 kg	13 August
Silver	Magomed Gasanov	Sambo	Men's 98 kg	14 August
Bronze	Valeriia Andreeva	Finswimming	Women's 50 m bi-fins	10 August
Bronze	Ekaterina Mikhaylushkina	Finswimming	Women's 200 m surface	10 August
Bronze	Aleksei Fedkin	Finswimming	Men's 100 m bi-fins	10 August
Bronze	Elizaveta Kupressova	Finswimming	Women's 400 m surface	11 August
Bronze	Nina Serdiuk	Sambo	Women's 59 kg	13 August

Medals by sport
Sport	1st place, gold medalist(s)	2nd place, silver medalist(s)	3rd place, bronze medalist(s)	Total
Sambo	2	4	1	7
Finswimming	2	0	4	6
Muaythai	1	0	0	1
Freediving	0	2	0	2
Total	5	6	5	16

== Competitors ==
The following is the list of number of competitors in the Games.

Sport	Men	Women	Total
Billiards sports	0	1	1
Dancesport	1	1	2
Karate	1	0	1
Freediving	3	1	4
Finswimming	3	6	9
Muaythai	1	2	3
Sambo	5	5	10
Wakeboarding	0	1	1
Wushu	0	2	2
Total	14	19	33

== Billiards sports ==
Athlete	From	Event	Preliminary round			Quarterfinals	Semifinals	Final / BM	
Athlete	From	Event	Opposition Result	Opposition Result	Rank	Opposition Result	Opposition Result	Opposition Result	Rank
Kristina Tkach	Russia	Women's 10-ball	Kaplan (GER); L 5–7	Ropero (ESP); W 7–6	3	Did not advance			

== Dancesport ==
Individual Neutral Athletes competed in dancesport.

Athlete	From	Event	First Round		Semifinal		Final	
Athlete	From	Event	Points	Rank	Points	Rank	Points	Rank
Nikita Anikeev; Elina Kokotova	Russia	Standard	169.17	15	Did not advance			

== Finswimming ==
Athlete	From	Event	Time	Rank
Arseniy Desyatov	Russia	Men's 50 m bi-fins	19.30	7
Aleksei Fedkin	Russia	Men's 100 m bi-fins	41.24	3rd place, bronze medalist(s)
Vladimir Zhuravlev	Russia	Men's 50 m apnoea	14.77	5
Valeriia Andreeva	Russia	Women's 50 m bi-fins	21.80	3rd place, bronze medalist(s)
Irina Gileva	Russia	Women's 50 m bi-fins	21.93	5
Vlada Markina	Russia	Women's 200 m surface	1:29.56	5
Ekaterina Mikhaylushkina	Russia	Women's 200 m surface	1:29.05	3rd place, bronze medalist(s)
Elizaveta Kupressova	Russia	Women's 400 m surface	3:14.11	3rd place, bronze medalist(s)
Diana Sliseva	Russia	Women's 50 m apnoea	15.74	1st place, gold medalist(s)
Diana Sliseva	Russia	Women's 100 m surface	38.62	1st place, gold medalist(s)

== Freediving ==
Athlete	From	Event	Distance (m)	Rank
Alexey Molchanov	Russia	Men's Dynamic no Fins	Disqualified	
Alexey Molchanov	Russia	Men's Dynamic with Fins	305.5	2nd place, silver medalist(s)
Eduard Samofalov	Russia	Men's Dynamic no Fins FFS1-FFS2	86.0	4
Eduard Samofalov	Russia	Men's Dynamic with Fins FFS1-FFS2	123.0	5
Alexander Kusakin	Russia	Men's Dynamic no Fins FFS3-FFS4	107.0	2nd place, silver medalist(s)
Anastasia Diodorova	Russia	Women's Dynamic no Fins FFS1-FFS2	56.0	4
Anastasia Diodorova	Russia	Women's Dynamic with Fins FFS1-FFS2	109.5	5

== Karate ==
Individual Neutral Athletes competed in karate.

Men

Athlete	From	Event	Pool round				Semifinals	Final / BM	
Athlete	From	Event	Opposition Result	Opposition Result	Opposition Result	Rank	Opposition Result	Opposition Result	Rank
Eduard Gasparian	Russia	84 kg	Duan (CHN); L 1–3	Chobotar (UKR); L 0–4	Shimada (JPN); L 0–2	4	Did not advance		

== Muaythai ==
Athlete	From	Event	Quarterfinal	Semifinal	Final / BM	
Athlete	From	Event	Opposition Score	Opposition Score	Opposition Score	Rank
Konstantin Shakhtarin	Russia	Men's –71 kg	Branis (ISR); W 30–27	Spéth (HUN); W 30–27	Franzosi (ITA); W 30–26	1st place, gold medalist(s)
Anna Safeeva	Russia	Women's –54 kg	Kierczyńska (POL); L 27–30	Did not advance		
Marina Bespalova	Russia	Women's –60 kg	Płachta (POL); W 30–27	Han (CHN); L 27–30	Kamtakrapoom (THA); L 28–29	4

== Sambo ==
Athlete	From	Event	Quarterfinal	Semifinal	Final / BM	
Athlete	From	Event	Opposition Result	Opposition Result	Opposition Result	Rank
Sheikh-Mansur Khabibulaev	Russia	Men's –64 kg	Difalco (ITA); W 4–0^{TV}	Voropaiev (UKR); W 4–0^{TV}	Rakhmetollin (KAZ); W 3–0^{TV}	1st place, gold medalist(s)
Rolan Zinnatov	Russia	Men's –71 kg	El-Bitar (EGY); W 4–0^{TV}	Zamirbek Uulu (KGZ); W 6–0^{VP}	Kucherenko (UKR); L 1–6^{VP}	2nd place, silver medalist(s)
Ovanes Abgarian	Russia	Men's –79 kg	Vardanyan (ARM); W 10–0^{TV}	Bessala Awono (CMR); W 4–0^{TV}	Rudnev (UKR); L 0–3^{VP}	2nd place, silver medalist(s)
Abusupiyan Alikhanov	Russia	Men's –88 kg	Colquhoun (JAM); W 9–1^{VP}	Khasanboev (UZB); W 1–0^{VP}	Davydenko (UKR); L 1–4^{VP}	2nd place, silver medalist(s)
Magomed Gasanov	Russia	Men's –98 kg	Van den Brink (NED); W 10–2^{TV}	Murotov (UZB); W 10–0^{VP}	Avanesyan (ARM); L 2–3^{TV}	2nd place, silver medalist(s)
Mariia Doroshenko	Russia	Women's –54 kg	Campos (VEN); L 1–9^{VP}	Did not advance		
Nina Serdiuk	Russia	Women's –59 kg	Córdoba (CRC); W 2–0^{TV}	Enkhbaataryn (MGL); L 1–5^{VP}	Lapayeva (AIN); W 0–0^{TV}	3rd place, bronze medalist(s)
Yelizaveta Lapayeva	Belarus	Women's –59 kg	Hovakimyan (ARM); W 2–0^{TV}	Azatova (UZB); L 0–2^{TV}	Serdiuk (AIN); L 0–0^{TV}	4
Sofia Istomina	Russia	Women's –65 kg	Peña (DOM); W 7–1^{VP}	Block (ISR); W 6–0^{VP}	Bobokulova (UZB); W 2–2^{VP}	1st place, gold medalist(s)
Alesia Medvedeva	Russia	Women's –72 kg	Uran-Ölziin (MGL); L 2–9^{VP}	Did not advance		

== Wakeboarding ==
Athlete	From	Event	Heat		Last chance qualifiers		Semifinal		Final	
Athlete	From	Event	Result	Rank	Result	Rank	Result	Rank	Result	Rank
Ira Ryzhova	Russia	Women's cable wakeboard	57.40	2 Q	Bye		37.60	5	Did not advance	

== Wushu ==
Individual Neutral Athletes qualified two athlete.

Sanda

Athlete	From	Event	Quarterfinal	Semifinal	Final / BM	
Athlete	From	Event	Opposition Result	Opposition Result	Opposition Result	Rank
Viktoriia Kriukova	Russia	Women's sanda 60 kg	Nguyễn (VIE); L WPD	Did not advance		
Anastasiia Kotova	Russia	Women's sanda 70 kg	Aly (EGY); L 0–2	Did not advance		
