= Finswimming at the 2025 World Games – Women's 400 metre surface =

Women's 400 metre surface at the 2025 World Games
- Venue: Chengdu Sport University Sancha Lake Campus Natatorium, Chengdu
- Date: 11 August
- Competitors: 8 from 6 nations
- Winning time: 3:11.88

Medalists
1st place, gold medalist(s)		Sofiia Hrechko	Ukraine
2nd place, silver medalist(s)		Anna Yakovleva	Ukraine
3rd place, bronze medalist(s)		Elizaveta Kupressova	Individual Neutral Athletes

The women's 400 metre surface competition in finswimming at the 2025 World Games was held on 11 August at the Chengdu Sport University Sancha Lake Campus Natatorium in Chengdu, China.

== Records ==
Prior to this competition, the existing world and World Games records were as follows:

World record	Sun Yiting (CHN)	3:12.10	Belgrade, Serbia	16 July 2024
World Games record	Johanna Schikora (GER)	3:14.22	Birmingham, United States	9 July 2022

== Results ==
The final took place at 17:28.

Rank	Lane	Athlete	Nation	Time	Note
1st place, gold medalist(s)	3	Sofiia Hrechko	Ukraine	3:11.88	WR
2nd place, silver medalist(s)	5	Anna Yakovleva	Ukraine	3:12.27	
3rd place, bronze medalist(s)	4	Elizaveta Kupressova	Individual Neutral Athletes	3:14.11	
4	2	Lilla Blaszák	Hungary	3:17.19	
5	1	Ágnes Szili	Hungary	3:19.37	
6	8	Dora Bassi	Croatia	3:22.50	
7	6	Nada Magdy Hagrass	Egypt	3:23.65	
8	7	Johanna Schikora	Germany	3:30.47	
