= Acrobatic gymnastics at the 2025 World Games – Mixed pairs =

Mixed pairs at the 2025 World Games
- Venue: Dong'an Lake Sports Park Gymnasium, Chengdu, China
- Date: 8 August
- Competitors: 12 from 6 nations
- Winning total: 29.110 points

Medalists
1st place, gold medalist(s)		Yevfrosyniia Kryvytska; Ivan Labunets	Ukraine
2nd place, silver medalist(s)		Lara Fernandes; Guilherme Henriques	Portugal
3rd place, bronze medalist(s)		Yonatan Fridman; Amy Refaeli	Israel

The mixed pairs competition at the 2025 World Games took place on 8 August at the Dong'an Lake Sports Park Gymnasium in Chengdu, China.

== Competition format ==
The top 4 teams in qualifications, based on combined scores of each round, advanced to the final. The scores in qualification do not count in the final.

== Results ==
=== Qualification ===
The results were as follows:

Team	Balance		Dynamic		Total (All-around)	
Team	Score	Rank	Score	Rank	Score	Rank
Ukraine	29.340	1	29.380	1	57.720	1
Portugal	27.920	3	28.100	2	56.020	2
Israel	28.110	2	27.490	3	55.600	3
Azerbaijan	26.530	4	27.030	4	53.560	4
Kazakhstan	25.790	6	26.570	5	52.360	5
Bulgaria	25.970	5	25.550	6	51.520	6

=== Final ===
The results were as follows:

Rank	Team	Difficulty	Artistry	Execution	Penalty	Total (All-around)
Rank	Team	Score	Score	Score	Score	Score
1st place, gold medalist(s)	Ukraine	2.710	8.800	18.100	-0.50	29.110
2nd place, silver medalist(s)	Portugal	2.140	8.800	17.600		28.540
3rd place, bronze medalist(s)	Israel	2.100	9.050	17.100		28.250
4	Azerbaijan	1.690	8.700	17.000		27.390
