= Acrobatic gymnastics at the 2025 World Games – Men's pairs =

Men's pairs at the 2025 World Games
- Venue: Dong'an Lake Sports Park Gymnasium, Chengdu, China
- Date: 9 August
- Competitors: 12 from 6 nations
- Winning total: 28.820 points

Medalists
| 1st place, gold medalist(s) | | Juan Daniel Molina; José Moreno | Spain |
| 2nd place, silver medalist(s) | | Daniel Abbasov; Murad Rafiyev | Azerbaijan |
| 3rd place, bronze medalist(s) | | Miguel Lopes; Gonçalo Parreira | Portugal |

The men's pairs competition at the 2025 World Games took place on 9 August at the Dong'an Lake Sports Park Gymnasium in Chengdu, China.

== Competition format ==
The top 4 teams in qualifications, based on combined scores of each round, advanced to the final. The scores in qualification do not count in the final.

== Results ==
=== Qualification ===
The results were as follows:

| Gymnasts | Team | Balance | | Dynamic | | Total (All-around) | |
| Gymnasts | Team | Score | Rank | Score | Rank | Score | Rank |
|---|---|---|---|---|---|---|---|
| Miguel Lopes; Gonçalo Parreira | Portugal | 29.070 | 1 | 27.490 | 5 | 56.560 | 1 |
| Daniyel Dil; Vadim Shulyar | Kazakhstan | 28.400 | 2 | 27.990 | 2 | 56.390 | 2 |
| José Moreno; Juan Daniel Molina | Spain | 28.300 | 3 | 28.010 | 1 | 56.310 | 3 |
| Daniel Abbasov; Murad Rafiyev | Azerbaijan | 28.250 | 4 | 27.800 | 3 | 56.050 | 4 |
| Panayot Dimitrov; Georgi Stoyanov | Bulgaria | 27.530 | 5 | 27.500 | 4 | 55.030 | 5 |
| Sofronii Davydenko; Ivan Horlach | Ukraine | 26.660 | 6 | 24.580 | 6 | 51.240 | 6 |

=== Final ===
The results were as follows:

| Rank | Gymnasts | Team | Difficulty | Artistry | Execution | Penalty | Total (All-around) |
| Rank | Gymnasts | Team | Score | Score | Score | Score | Score |
|---|---|---|---|---|---|---|---|
| 1st place, gold medalist(s) | José Moreno; Juan Daniel Molina | Spain | 1.920 | 8.900 | 18.000 | | 28.820 |
| 2nd place, silver medalist(s) | Daniel Abbasov; Murad Rafiyev | Azerbaijan | 2.280 | 8.750 | 17.700 | | 28.730 |
| 3rd place, bronze medalist(s) | Miguel Lopes; Gonçalo Parreira | Portugal | 2.150 | 9.000 | 17.400 | | 28.550 |
| 4 | Daniyel Dil; Vadim Shulyar | Kazakhstan | 2.310 | 8.550 | 16.900 | | 27.760 |
