= Muaythai at the 2025 World Games – Men's 71 kg =

World Games muaythai event

Men's 71 kg at the 2025 World Games
- Muaythai pictogram
- Venue: Sichuan Provincial Gymnasium
- Dates: 8–10 August 2025
- Competitors: 8 from 8 nations

Medalists
1st place, gold medalist(s)		Konstantin Shakhtarin	Individual Neutral Athletes
2nd place, silver medalist(s)		Gianluca Franzosi	Italy
3rd place, bronze medalist(s)		Attila Norbert Spéth	Hungary

The men's 71 kg muaythai (Note: Muaythai is the official name of Muay Thai, recognized by International World Games Association and International Olympic Committee.) event at the 2025 World Games was held from 8 to 10 August 2025 at the Sichuan Provincial Gymnasium. 8 Muay Thai practitioners from 8 nations participated in the event.

== Competition schedule ==
All times are in local time (UTC+8), according to the official schedule.

Date	Time	Event
8 August 2025	18:00	Quarterfinals
9 August 2025	19:30	Semifinals
10 August 2025	18:45	Bronze medal match
10 August 2025	20:15	Gold medal match

== Results ==
=== Legend ===
- RET — Won by Retirement
- RSC-H — Won by Referee Stopping Contest - Hard Head Blows
- WO — Won by Walkover

=== Bracket ===
Quarterfinals
Konstantin Shakhtarin (AIN)	30
Maxim Branis (ISR)	27
Attila Norbert Spéth (HUN)	RSCH
Ruslan Zayakin (KAZ)
Gianluca Franzosi (ITA)	RSCB
Ji Longteng (CHN)
Abdelali Zahidi (MAR)	28
Oleksandr Yefimenko (UKR)	29

Semifinals
Konstantin Shakhtarin (AIN)	30
Attila Norbert Spéth (HUN)	27
Gianluca Franzosi (ITA)	RSCB
Oleksandr Yefimenko (UKR)

Gold medal bout
Konstantin Shakhtarin (AIN)	30
Gianluca Franzosi (ITA)	26
Bronze medal bout
Attila Norbert Spéth (HUN)	29
Oleksandr Yefimenko (UKR)	28
