= Finswimming at the 2025 World Games – Women's 100 metre surface =

Women's 100 metre surface at the 2025 World Games
- Venue: Chengdu Sport University Sancha Lake Campus Natatorium, Chengdu
- Date: 11 August
- Competitors: 8 from 6 nations
- Winning time: 38.62

Medalists
| 1st place, gold medalist(s) | | Diana Sliseva | Individual Neutral Athletes |
| 2nd place, silver medalist(s) | | Hu Yaoyao | China |
| 3rd place, bronze medalist(s) | | Anastasiia Makarenko | Ukraine |

The women's 100 metre surface competition in finswimming at the 2025 World Games was held on 11 August at the Chengdu Sport University Sancha Lake Campus Natatorium in Chengdu, China.

== Records ==
Prior to this competition, the existing world and World Games records were as follows:

| World record | Hu Yaoyao (CHN) | 37.75 | Belgrade, Serbia | 16 July 2024 |
| World Games record | Zhu Baozhen (CHN) | 38.11 | Kaohsiung, Chinese Taipei | 24 July 2009 |

== Results ==
The final took place at 16:48.

| Rank | Lane | Athlete | Nation | Time | Note |
|---|---|---|---|---|---|
| 1st place, gold medalist(s) | 3 | Diana Sliseva | Individual Neutral Athletes | 38.62 | |
| 2nd place, silver medalist(s) | 4 | Hu Yaoyao | China | 38.93 | |
| 3rd place, bronze medalist(s) | 8 | Anastasiia Makarenko | Ukraine | 39.14 | |
| 4 | 2 | Viktoriia Uvarova | Ukraine | 39.64 | |
| 5 | 1 | Moon Ye-jin | South Korea | 39.72 | |
| 6 | 6 | Paula Aguirre | Colombia | 39.76 | |
| 7 | 7 | Ifigeneia Teliousi | Greece | 40.21 | |
| 8 | 5 | Seo Ui-jin | South Korea | 40.45 | |
