= Kickboxing at the 2025 World Games – Men's K1 style 91 kg =

Men's K1 style 91 kg at the 2025 World Games
- Venue: Sichuan Provincial Gymnasium
- Location: Chengdu, China
- Dates: 12–14 August 2025
- Competitors: 8 from 8 nations

Medalists
gold medal	Roman Shcherbatiuk	Ukraine
silver medal	Emin Özer	Turkey
bronze medal	Khusankhon Baratov	Uzbekistan

The men's K1 style 91 kg competition in kickboxing at the 2025 World Games took place from 12 to 14 August 2025 at the Sichuan Provincial Gymnasium in Chengdu, China.

== Competition format ==
A total of 8 athletes entered the competition. They fought in the cup system.

== Results ==
Quarterfinals
Roman Shcherbatiuk (UKR)	3
Mohamed Abdelhady (EGY)	0
Shi Haifeng (CHN)	0
Abdarhmane Coulibaly (FRA)	3
Iuri Fernandes (POR)	1
Khusankhon Baratov (UZB)	2
Robert Dochod (POL)	1
Emin Özer (TUR)	2

Semifinals
Roman Shcherbatiuk (UKR)	3
Abdarhmane Coulibaly (FRA)	0
Khusankhon Baratov (UZB)	0
Emin Özer (TUR)	3

Final
Roman Shcherbatiuk (UKR)	3
Emin Özer (TUR)	0

Third place
Abdarhmane Coulibaly (FRA)	0
Khusankhon Baratov (UZB)	3
