= Finswimming at the 2025 World Games – Women's 200 metre surface =

Women's 200 metre surface at the 2025 World Games
- Venue: Chengdu Sport University Sancha Lake Campus Natatorium, Chengdu
- Date: 10 August
- Competitors: 8 from 5 nations
- Winning time: 1:27.90

Medalists
1st place, gold medalist(s)		Sofiia Hrechko	Ukraine
2nd place, silver medalist(s)		Lilla Blaszák	Hungary
3rd place, bronze medalist(s)		Ekaterina Mikhaylushkina	Individual Neutral Athletes

The women's 200 metre surface competition in finswimming at the 2025 World Games was held place on 10 August at the Chengdu Sport University Sancha Lake Campus Natatorium in Chengdu, China.

== Records ==
Prior to this competition, the existing world and World Games records were as follows:

World record	Valeriya Baranovskaya (RUS)	1:25.41	Wrocław, Poland	21 July 2017
World Games record	Valeriya Baranovskaya (RUS)	1:25.41	Wrocław, Poland	21 July 2017

== Results ==
The final took place at 17:02.

Rank	Lane	Athlete	Nation	Time	Note
1st place, gold medalist(s)	3	Sofiia Hrechko	Ukraine	1:27.90	
2nd place, silver medalist(s)	1	Lilla Blaszák	Hungary	1:28.42	
3rd place, bronze medalist(s)	5	Ekaterina Mikhaylushkina	Individual Neutral Athletes	1:29.05	
4	7	Sára Suba	Hungary	1:29.36	
5	4	Vlada Markina	Individual Neutral Athletes	1:29.56	
6	8	Michele Rütze	Germany	1:31.39	
7	6	Viktoriia Uvarova	Ukraine	1:34.00	
8	2	Xu Yichuan	China	1:34.29	
