= Finswimming at the 2025 World Games – Men's 100 metre bi-fins =

Men's 100 metre bi-fins at the 2025 World Games
- Venue: Chengdu Sport University Sancha Lake Campus Natatorium, Chengdu
- Date: 10 August
- Competitors: 8 from 7 nations
- Winning time: 40.45

Medalists
1st place, gold medalist(s)		Szymon Kropidłowski	Poland
2nd place, silver medalist(s)		Szebasztián Szabó Györgyei	Hungary
3rd place, bronze medalist(s)		Aleksei Fedkin	Individual Neutral Athletes

The men's 100 metre bi-fins competition in finswimming at the 2025 World Games was held on 10 August at the Chengdu Sport University Sancha Lake Campus Natatorium in Chengdu, China.

== Records ==
Prior to this competition, the existing world and World Games records were as follows:

World record	Szymon Kropidłowski (POL)	40.60	Olsztyn, Poland	19 July 2025
World Games record	Szymon Kropidłowski (POL)	41.41	Chengdu, China	29 March 2025

== Results ==
The final took place at 17:16.

Rank	Lane	Athlete	Nation	Time	Note
1st place, gold medalist(s)	6	Szymon Kropidłowski	Poland	40.45	WR
2nd place, silver medalist(s)	4	Szebasztián Szabó Györgyei	Hungary	40.57	
3rd place, bronze medalist(s)	5	Aleksei Fedkin	Individual Neutral Athletes	41.24	
4	7	Juho Herva	Finland	41.45	
5	2	Pongpanod Trithan	Thailand	41.69	
6	3	Kelen Cséplő	Hungary	41.79	
7	1	Marco Orsi	Italy	41.80	
8	8	Artur Artamonov	Ukraine	42.10	
