= Finswimming at the 2025 World Games – Women's 50 metre apnoea =

Women's 50 metre apnoea at the 2025 World Games
- Venue: Chengdu Sport University Sancha Lake Campus Natatorium, Chengdu
- Date: 10 August
- Competitors: 8 from 6 nations
- Winning time: 15.74

Medalists
1st place, gold medalist(s)		Diana Sliseva	Individual Neutral Athletes
2nd place, silver medalist(s)		Seo Ui-jin	South Korea
3rd place, bronze medalist(s)		Yoon Mi-ri	South Korea

The women's 50 metre apnoea competition in finswimming at the 2025 World Games was held on 10 August at the Chengdu Sport University Sancha Lake Campus Natatorium in Chengdu, China.

== Records ==
Prior to this competition, the existing world and World Games records were as follows:

World record	Zhu Baozhen (CHN)	15.10	Kaoshiung, Chinese Taipei	23 July 2009
World Games record	Zhu Baozhen (CHN)	15.10	Kaoshiung, Chinese Taipei	23 July 2009

== Results ==
The final took place at 16:30.

Rank	Lane	Athlete	Nation	Time	Note
1st place, gold medalist(s)	2	Diana Sliseva	Individual Neutral Athletes	15.74	
2nd place, silver medalist(s)	5	Seo Ui-jin	South Korea	15.79	
3rd place, bronze medalist(s)	6	Yoon Mi-ri	South Korea	16.07	
4	4	Hu Yaoyao	China	16.38	
5	3	Shu Chengjing	China	16.51	
6	1	Viktoriia Uvarova	Ukraine	16.57	
7	7	Paula Aguirre	Colombia	16.70	
8	8	Maïwenn Hamon	France	16.88	
