= Finswimming at the 2025 World Games – Men's 50 metre apnoea =

Men's 50 metre apnoea at the 2025 World Games
- Venue: Chengdu Sport University Sancha Lake Campus Natatorium, Chengdu
- Date: 11 August
- Competitors: 8 from 5 nations
- Winning time: 13.74

Medalists
1st place, gold medalist(s)		Shin Myeong-jun	South Korea
2nd place, silver medalist(s)		Max Poschart	Germany
3rd place, bronze medalist(s)		Zhang Siqian	China

The men's 50 metre apnoea competition in finswimming at the 2025 World Games was held on 11 August at the Chengdu Sport University Sancha Lake Campus Natatorium in Chengdu, China.

== Records ==
Prior to this competition, the existing world and World Games records were as follows:

World record	Pavel Kabanov (RUS)	13.70	Ioannina, Greece	30 June 2019
World Games record	Pavel Kabanov (RUS)	13.87	Wrocław, Poland	22 July 2017

== Results ==
The final took place at 16:30.

Rank	Lane	Athlete	Nation	Time	Note
1st place, gold medalist(s)	5	Shin Myeong-jun	South Korea	13.74	WG
2nd place, silver medalist(s)	3	Max Poschart	Germany	13.87	
3rd place, bronze medalist(s)	4	Zhang Siqian	China	14.21	
4	1	Guan Hanzhi	China	14.32	
5	2	Vladimir Zhuravlev	Individual Neutral Athletes	14.77	
6	8	Mauricio Fernández	Colombia	14.82	
7	7	Niklas Loßner	Germany	15.38	
8	6	Lee Dong-jin	South Korea	16.32	
