= Finswimming at the 2025 World Games – Men's 50 metre bi-fins =

Men's 50 metre bi-fins at the 2025 World Games
- Venue: Chengdu Sport University Sancha Lake Campus Natatorium, Chengdu
- Date: 11 August
- Competitors: 8 from 7 nations
- Winning time: 17.96

Medalists
| 1st place, gold medalist(s) | | Szebasztián Szabó Györgyei | Hungary |
| 2nd place, silver medalist(s) | | Szymon Kropidłowski | Poland |
| 3rd place, bronze medalist(s) | | Marco Orsi | Italy |
| 3rd place, bronze medalist(s) | | Artur Artamonov | Ukraine |

The men's 50 metre bi-fins competition in finswimming at the 2025 World Games was held on 11 August at the Chengdu Sport University Sancha Lake Campus Natatorium in Chengdu, China.

== Records ==
Prior to this competition, the existing world and World Games records were as follows:

| World record | Andrey Arbuzov (RUS) | 18.41 | Volos, Greece | 26 June 2016 |
| World Games record | Andrey Arbuzov (RUS) | 18.55 | Wrocław, Poland | 22 July 2017 |

== Results ==
The final took place at 16:35.

| Rank | Lane | Athlete | Nation | Time | Note |
|---|---|---|---|---|---|
| 1st place, gold medalist(s) | 4 | Szebasztián Szabó Györgyei | Hungary | 17.96 | WR |
| 2nd place, silver medalist(s) | 3 | Szymon Kropidłowski | Poland | 18.41 | |
| 3rd place, bronze medalist(s) | 5 | Marco Orsi | Italy | 18.83 | |
| 3rd place, bronze medalist(s) | 8 | Artur Artamonov | Ukraine | 18.83 | |
| 5 | 6 | Ioannis Ioakeimidis | Greece | 18.86 | |
| 6 | 7 | Juho Herva | Finland | 19.21 | |
| 7 | 2 | Arsenii Desiatov | Individual Neutral Athletes | 19.30 | |
| 8 | 1 | Regő Wórum | Hungary | 19.49 | |
