= Acrobatic gymnastics at the 2025 World Games =

- Venue: Dong'an Lake Sports Park Gymnasium
- Dates: 8–10 August 2025
- No. of events: 5
- Competitors: 78 from 14 nations

The acrobatic gymnastics competition at the 2025 World Games took place from 8 to 10 August 2025 at the Dong'an Lake Sports Park Gymnasium in Chengdu, China. The discipline included five events.

== Qualification ==
A total of six pairs/groups qualified for each event. The 2024 Acrobatic Gymnastics World Championships served as the main qualifying event, providing with five of the six spots. The remaining one came as a wildcard.

== Participating nations ==
- Australia (8)
- Azerbaijan (2)
- Belgium (2)
- Bulgaria (2)
- China (7)
- Germany (7)
- Great Britain (4)
- Israel (11)
- Kazakhstan (4)
- Netherlands (3)
- Portugal (6)
- Spain (4)
- Ukraine (13)
- United States (5)

== Medal table ==
* Host nation (China)

Rank	Nation	Gold	Silver	Bronze	Total
1	Ukraine	1	2	0	3
2	Israel	1	0	2	3
3	Belgium	1	0	0	1
3	China*	1	0	0	1
3	Spain	1	0	0	1
6	Portugal	0	1	2	3
7	Azerbaijan	0	1	0	1
7	United States	0	1	0	1
9	Great Britain	0	0	1	1
Totals (9 entries)		5	5	5	15

== Events ==
=== Men ===
Event	Gold	Silver	Bronze
Pairs	Spain; Juan Daniel Molina; José Moreno	Azerbaijan; Daniel Abbasov; Murad Rafiyev	Portugal; Miguel Lopes; Gonçalo Parreira
Group	Israel; Or Abraham; Rotem Amihai; Lior Borodin; Tomer Offir	Ukraine; Stanislav Kukurudz; Yurii Push; Yuriy Savka; Taras Yarush	Great Britain; Louis Alexander; Rex Booth; Samuel Ditchburn; Freddie Turner

=== Women ===
Event	Gold	Silver	Bronze
Pairs	Belgium; Maysae Bouhouch; Silke Macharis	Ukraine; Anhelina Cherniavska; Ruzanna Vecheruk	Portugal; Beatriz Carneiro; Inês Faria
Group	China; Ding Wenyan; Gu Quanjia; Ma Yixing	United States; Caylei Caldwell; Olivia Green; Rebecca Greenberg	Israel; Nikol Aleinik; Lia Bar Noy; Michal Stratievsky

=== Mixed ===
Event	Gold	Silver	Bronze
Pairs	Ukraine; Yevfrosyniia Kryvytska; Ivan Labunets	Portugal; Lara Fernandes; Guilherme Henriques	Israel; Yonatan Fridman; Amy Refaeli
