= Canoe marathon at the 2025 World Games – Women's K-1 long distance =

Women's K1 long distance at the 2025 World Games
- Venue: Xinglong Lake, Chengdu, China
- Date: 10 August
- Competitors: 19 from 19 nations

Medalists
1st place, gold medalist(s)		Melina Andersson	Sweden
2nd place, silver medalist(s)		Vanda Kiszli	Hungary
3rd place, bronze medalist(s)		Pernille Hostrup	Denmark

The women's K1 long distance competition in canoe marathon at the 2025 World Games took place on 10 August 2025 at Xinglong Lake in Chengdu, China.

A total of 20 athletes participated from 20 nations.

== Results ==
Results were as follows:

Rank	Athlete	Nation	Time	Notes
1st place, gold medalist(s)	Melina Andersson	Sweden	1:48:11.11	
2nd place, silver medalist(s)	Vanda Kiszli	Hungary	1:49:54.75	
3rd place, bronze medalist(s)	Pernille Hostrup	Denmark	1:51:16.60	
4	Maria Rei	Portugal	1:51:23.75	
5	Kateřina Mílová	Czech Republic	1:51:36.77	
6	Eva Barrios	Spain	1:51:53.84	
7	Zhou Yuexin	China	1:52:21.84	
8	Rebecca Mann	Australia	1:52:24.56	
9	Saskia Hockly	South Africa	1:54:18.72	
10	Kitty Schiphorst	Netherlands	1:54:39.07	
11	Romana Švecová	Slovakia	1:55:13.06	
12	Caroline Heuser	Germany	1:57:02.34	
13	Emma Kemp	New Zealand	1:58:08.33	
14	Melissa Johnson	Great Britain	2:01:12.04	
15	Anette Baum	Estonia	1:49:57.04	–1L
16	Mathilde Forest	France	1:50:28.69	–1L
17	Cecilia Collueque	Argentina	1:51:43.71	–1L
	Susanna Cicali	Italy	Did not finish	
	Krisztina Bedocs	Serbia	Did not finish	
	Honami Tohda	Japan	Did not start	
