= Canoe marathon at the 2025 World Games – Men's K-1 long distance =

Men's K-1 long distance at the 2025 World Games
- Venue: Xinglong Lake, Chengdu, China
- Date: 10 August
- Competitors: 20 from 20 nations

Medalists
1st place, gold medalist(s)		Mads Pedersen	Denmark
2nd place, silver medalist(s)		Hamish Lovemore	South Africa
3rd place, bronze medalist(s)		José Ramalho	Portugal

The men's K1 long distance competition in canoe marathon at the 2025 World Games took place on 10 August 2025 at Xinglong Lake in Chengdu, China.

A total of 20 athletes participated from 20 nations.

== Results ==
Results were as follows:

Rank	Athlete	Nation	Time	Notes
1st place, gold medalist(s)	Mads Pedersen	Denmark	1:36:28.44	
2nd place, silver medalist(s)	Hamish Lovemore	South Africa	1:35:39.17	
3rd place, bronze medalist(s)	José Ramalho	Portugal	1:36:25.10	
4	Jérémy Candy	France	1:36:32.68	
5	Bálint Noé	Hungary	1:38:04.12	
6	James Russell	Great Britain	1:38:04.73	
7	Nico Paufler	Germany	1:38:38.79	
8	Joshua Kippin	Australia	1:38:39.48	
9	Jakub Zavřel	Czech Republic	1:39:40.71	
10	Andrea Dal Bianco	Italy	1:39:43.02	
11	Iván Alonso	Spain	1:40:56.23	
12	Jon Vold	Norway	1:41:48.82	
13	Milan Dekker	Netherlands	1:41:57.97	
14	Maksym Redko	Ukraine	1:42:00.69	
15	Juan Ignacio Cáceres	Argentina	1:43:21.27	
16	Daan Cox	Belgium	1:43:46.50	
17	Paul Donnellan	Ireland	1:45:37.80	
18	Igor Wyszkowski	Poland	1:44:53.45	
19	Ding Shengkai	China	1:45:36.05	
20	Hiroki Shimogawa	Japan	1:45:40.66	
