= Finswimming at the 2025 World Games – Women's 50 metre bi-fins =

Women's 50 metre bi-fins at the 2025 World Games
- Venue: Chengdu Sport University Sancha Lake Campus Natatorium, Chengdu
- Date: 10 August
- Competitors: 8 from 5 nations
- Winning time: 20.59

Medalists
1st place, gold medalist(s)		Petra Senánszky	Hungary
2nd place, silver medalist(s)		Huang Mei-chien	Chinese Taipei
3rd place, bronze medalist(s)		Valeriia Andreeva	Individual Neutral Athletes

The women's 50 metre bi-fins competition in finswimming at the 2025 World Games was held on 10 August at the Chengdu Sport University Sancha Lake Campus Natatorium in Chengdu, China.

== Records ==
Prior to this competition, the existing world and World Games records were as follows:

World record	Petra Senánszky (HUN)	20.52	Wrocław, Poland	21 July 2017
World Games record	Petra Senánszky (HUN)	20.52	Wrocław, Poland	21 July 2017

== Results ==
The final took place at 16:36.

Rank	Lane	Athlete	Nation	Time	Note
1st place, gold medalist(s)	4	Petra Senánszky	Hungary	20.59	
2nd place, silver medalist(s)	5	Huang Mei-chien	Chinese Taipei	21.33	
3rd place, bronze medalist(s)	2	Valeriia Andreeva	Individual Neutral Athletes	21.80	
4	6	Zoé Turucz	Hungary	21.88	
5	7	Irina Gilveva	Individual Neutral Athletes	21.93	
6	3	Lilly Placzek	Germany	22.04	
7	8	Giorgia Destefani	Italy	22.24	
8	1	Viola Magoga	Italy	22.58	
