= Finswimming at the 2025 World Games =

- Venue: Chengdu Sport University Sancha Lake Campus Natatorium
- Dates: 10–11 August
- No. of events: 16
- Competitors: 99 from 17 nations

The finswimming competition at the 2025 World Games took place from 10 to 11 August 2025, in Chengdu in China, at the Natatorium of the Chengdu Sport University Sancha Lake Campus. The discipline included sixteen events (eight for men and eight for women).

== Qualification ==
A total of eight swimmers qualified for each event, based on the World Finswimming Rankings.

== Participating nations ==
- China (8)
- Chinese Taipei (2)
- Colombia (9)
- Croatia (1)
- Finland (1)
- France (5)
- Egypt (2)
- Germany (9)
- Greece (9)
- Hungary (12)
- Individual Neutral Athletes (9)
- Italy (6)
- Poland (2)
- South Korea (10)
- Thailand (1)
- Turkey (1)
- Ukraine (12)

== Medal table ==
* Host nation (China)

Rank	Nation	Gold	Silver	Bronze	Total
1	Hungary	5	3	1	9
2	Germany	3	3	0	6
3	Ukraine	2	4	5	11
4	China*	2	1	1	4
5	Individual Neutral Athletes	2	0	4	6
6	South Korea	1	1	2	4
7	Poland	1	1	0	2
8	Colombia	0	2	2	4
9	Chinese Taipei	0	1	0	1
10	Egypt	0	0	1	1
10	Italy	0	0	1	1
Totals (11 entries)		16	16	17	49

== Medalists ==
=== Men ===
Event	Gold		Silver		Bronze	
50 m apnoea	Shin Myeong-jun; South Korea	13.74; GR	Max Poschart; Germany	13.87	Zhang Siqian; China	14.21
50 m bi-fins	Szebasztián Szabó Györgyei; Hungary	17.96; WR	Szymon Kropidłowski; Poland	18.41	Marco Orsi; Italy Artur Artamonov; Ukraine	18.83
100 m bi-fins	Szymon Kropidłowski; Poland	40.45; WR	Szebasztián Szabó Györgyei; Hungary	40.57	Aleksei Fedkin; Individual Neutral Athletes	41.24
100 m surface	Max Poschart; Germany	33.81; GR	Justus Mörstedt; Germany	34.31	Tarek Hassan El-Sayed; Egypt	34.84
200 m surface	Nándor Kiss; Hungary	1:17.71; WR	Justus Mörstedt; Germany	1:18.80	Juan Ocampo; Colombia	1:19.38
400 m surface	Nándor Kiss; Hungary	2:52.68; WR	Oleksii Zakharov; Ukraine	2:57.03	Alex Mozsár; Hungary	2:58.61
4 × 50 m surface relay	Germany; Max Poschart (15.00); Niklas Loßner (14.57); Justus Mörstedt (14.78); Marek Leipold (15.00)	59.35; WR	Ukraine; Serhii Smishchenko (15.56); Oleksandr Kuzmenko (15.00); Davyd Yelisieiev (14.56); Oleksii Zakharov (15.14)	1:00.26	Colombia; Juan Rodríguez (15.55); Juan Duque (15.12); Mauricio Fernández (14.63); Juan Ocampo (15.06)	1:00.36
4 × 100 m surface relay	Germany; Niklas Loßner (34.99); Justus Mörstedt (34.18); Marek Leipold (35.28); Max Poschart (32.94)	2:17.39	Ukraine; Serhii Smishchenko (36.02); Oleksandr Kuzmenko (33.86); Davyd Yelisieiev (35.37); Oleksii Zakharov (33.48)	2:18.73	South Korea; Shin Myeong-jun (34.80); Lee Dong-jin (35.39); Jang Hyoung-ho (34.45); Kwon Nam-ho (34.14)	2:18.78

=== Women ===
Event	Gold		Silver		Bronze	
50 m apnoea	Diana Sliseva; Individual Neutral Athletes	15.74	Seo Ui-jin; South Korea	15.79	Yoon Mi-ri; South Korea	16.07
50 m bi-fins	Petra Senánszky; Hungary	20.59	Huang Mei-chien; Chinese Taipei	21.33	Valeriia Andreeva; Individual Neutral Athletes	21.80
100 m bi-fins	Petra Senánszky; Hungary	45.23	Dorottya Pernyész; Hungary	47.57	Sofiya Lamakh; Ukraine	47.87
100 m surface	Diana Sliseva; Individual Neutral Athletes	38.62	Hu Yaoyao; China	38.93	Anastasiia Makarenko; Ukraine	39.14
200 m surface	Sofiia Hrechko; Ukraine	1:27.90	Lilla Blaszák; Hungary	1:28.42	Ekaterina Mikhaylushkina; Individual Neutral Athletes	1:29.05
400 m surface	Sofiia Hrechko; Ukraine	3:11.88; WR	Anna Yakovleva; Ukraine	3:12.27	Elizaveta Kupressova; Individual Neutral Athletes	3:14.11
4 × 50 m surface relay	China; Xie Wenmin (17.38); Shu Chengjing (17.03); Xu Yichuan (17.14); Hu Yaoyao (16.44)	1:07.99; WR	Colombia; Grace Fernández (17.69); Paula Aguirre (16.79); Viviana Retamozo (17.48); Diana Moreno (16.86)	1:08.82	Ukraine; Yelyzaveta Hrechykhina (18.18); Sofiia Hrechko (17.42); Viktoriia Uvarova (17.44); Anastasiia Makarenko (17.02)	1:10.06
4 × 100 m surface relay	China; Shu Chengjing (39.93); Xu Yichuan (39.06); Xie Wenmin (39.20); Hu Yaoyao (37.87)	2:36.06	Colombia; Grace Fernández (38.88); Viviana Retamozo (39.44); Diana Moreno (38.75); Paula Aguirre (39.47)	2:36.54	Ukraine; Yelyzaveta Hrechykhina (40.09); Sofiia Hrechko (38.83); Viktoriia Uvarova (39.64); Anastasiia Makarenko (38.26)	2:36.82
