= Kickboxing at the 2025 World Games – Men's K1 style 63.5 kg =

Men's K1 style 63.5 kg at the 2025 World Games
- Venue: Sichuan Provincial Gymnasium
- Location: Chengdu, China
- Dates: 12–14 August 2025
- Competitors: 8 from 8 nations

Medalists
gold medal	Hlib Mazur	Ukraine
silver medal	Amin Guliyev	Azerbaijan
bronze medal	Asilbek Sodikov	Uzbekistan

The men's K1 style 63.5 kg competition in kickboxing at the 2025 World Games will take place from 12 to 14 August 2025 at the Sichuan Provincial Gymnasium in Chengdu, China.

== Competition format ==
A total of 8 athletes entered the competition. They fought in the cup system.

== Results ==
Quarterfinals
Hlib Mazur (UKR)	1
Vinicius Mestrinier (BRA)	1
Jakkrit Kongtook (THA)	3
Stanislav Renita (MDA)	0
Emmanuel Cardenas (SUI)	0
Asilbek Sodikov (UZB)	3
Mostepha Nambininjanahary (MAD)	0
Amin Guliyev (AZE)	3

Semifinals
Hlib Mazur (UKR)	2
Jakkrit Kongtook (THA)	1
Asilbek Sodikov (UZB)	0
Amin Guliyev (AZE)	3

Final
Hlib Mazur (UKR)	3
Amin Guliyev (AZE)	0

Third place
Jakkrit Kongtook (THA)	0
Asilbek Sodikov (UZB)	3
