= Denmark at the 2025 World Games =

- IOC code: DEN
- NOC: National Olympic Committee and Sports Confederation of Denmark

in Chengdu, China 7 August 2025 – 17 August 2025
- Competitors: 53 (27 men and 25 women) in 9 sports and 21 events
- Medals Ranked 23rd: Gold 4 Silver 2 Bronze 2 Total 8

World Games appearances
- 1981; 1985; 1989; 1993; 1997; 2001; 2005; 2009; 2013; 2017; 2022; 2025

Denmark will compete at the 2025 World Games held in Chengdu, China from 7 to 17 August 2025.

Athletes representing Denmark won four gold medals, two silver medals and two bronze medals. The country finished in 23rd place in the medal table.

== Medalists ==
Medal	Name	Sport	Event	Date
Gold	Mathias Fullerton; Sofie Marcussen	Archery	Mixed team compound	8 August
Gold	Mads Pedersen	Canoe marathon	Men's K1 short distance	9 August
Gold	Lucas Andersen	Ju-jitsu	Men's 77 kg fighting	10 August
Gold	Mads Pedersen	Canoe marathon	Men's K1 long distance	10 August
Silver	Casper Marti-Beckmann	Freediving	Men's dynamic with fins FFS1-FFS2	11 August
Silver	Rebekka Dahl	Ju-jitsu	Women's 57 kg fighting	11 August
Bronze	Casper Marti-Beckmann	Freediving	Men's dynamic no fins FFS1-FFS2	10 August
Bronze	Pernille Hostrup	Canoe marathon	Women's K1 long distance	10 August

== Competitors ==
The following is the list of number of competitors in the Games.

Sport	Men	Women	Total
Archery	1	1	2
Billards	0	1	1
Canoe marathon	2	2	4
Canoe polo	8	8	16
Dancesport	1	1	2
Handball	10	10	20
Ju-jitsu	2	2	4
Powerlifting	1	0	1
Underwater sports	2	0	2
Total	27	25	53

== Beach handball ==
Denmark qualified at the 2024 Men's Beach Handball World Championships and 2024 Women's Beach Handball World Championships from China.

Team	Event	Preliminary round				Semifinal / PM	Final / BM / PM	
Team	Event	Opposition Result	Opposition Result	Opposition Result	Rank	Opposition Result	Opposition Result	Rank
Denmark men's	Men's tournament							
Denmark women's	Women's tournament							

== Powerlifting ==
Equipped

Athlete	Event	Exercises			Total weight	Total points	Rank
Athlete	Event	Squat	Bench press	Deadlift	Total weight	Total points	Rank
Nicki Lentz	Men's Heavyweight	425.0	292.5	295.0	1012.5	104.62	4
