= Acrobatic gymnastics at the 2025 World Games – Women's pairs =

Women's pairs at the 2025 World Games
- Venue: Dong'an Lake Sports Park Gymnasium, Chengdu, China
- Date: 8 August
- Competitors: 12 from 6 nations
- Winning total: 28.620 points

Medalists
1st place, gold medalist(s)		Maysae Bouhouch; Silke Macharis	Belgium
2nd place, silver medalist(s)		Anhelina Cherniavska; Ruzanna Vecheruk	Ukraine
3rd place, bronze medalist(s)		Beatriz Carneiro; Inês Faria	United States

The women's pairs competition at the 2025 World Games took place on 8 August at the Dong'an Lake Sports Park Gymnasium in Chengdu, China.

== Competition format ==
The top 4 teams in qualifications, based on combined scores of each round, advanced to the final. The scores in qualification do not count in the final.

== Results ==
=== Qualification ===
The results were as follows:

Team	Balance		Dynamic		Total (All-around)	
Team	Score	Rank	Score	Rank	Score	Rank
Belgium	28.270	1	27.630	2	55.900	1
Ukraine	27.600	2	27.760	1	55.360	2
Portugal	27.330	3	27.340	3	54.670	3
United States	25.060	5	27.320	4	52.380	4
Israel	26.150	4	25.210	5	51.360	5
Australia	21.660	6	24.350	6	46.010	6

=== Final ===
The results were as follows:

Rank	Team	Difficulty	Artistry	Execution	Penalty	Total (All-around)
Rank	Team	Score	Score	Score	Score	Score
1st place, gold medalist(s)	Belgium	1.920	9.200	17.500		28.620
2nd place, silver medalist(s)	Ukraine	2.070	8.800	17.400		28.270
3rd place, bronze medalist(s)	Portugal	1.870	8.600	17.300		27.770
4	United States	1.900	8.650	16.700		27.250
