= Ju-jitsu at the 2025 World Games =

- Venue: Jianyang Cultural and Sports Centre Gymnasium
- Dates: 10–12 August 2025
- No. of events: 19
- Competitors: 129 from 37 nations

The ju-jitsu competition at the 2025 World Games took place from 10 to 12 August 2025 at the Jianyang Cultural and Sports Centre Gymnasium in Chengdu, China.

The competition had nineteen events, increasing from the eighteen held during the previous games. Freediving and ju-jitsu debuted para sports events. Three events were added for athletes with impairment (mental, physical, and visual impairment).

== Qualification ==
A total of six athletes/duos qualified for each event, based on the JJIF World Games Rankings. The Asian teams also qualified for the World Games after its performance at the 2022 Asian Games in Hangzhou.

== Medal table ==
* Host nation (China)

| Rank | Nation | Gold | Silver | Bronze | Total |
|---|---|---|---|---|---|
| 1 | Thailand | 3 | 0 | 1 | 4 |
| 2 | Israel | 2 | 2 | 1 | 5 |
| 3 | Germany | 2 | 1 | 1 | 4 |
| 4 | South Korea | 2 | 0 | 1 | 3 |
| 5 | Italy | 1 | 2 | 2 | 5 |
| 6 | United Arab Emirates | 1 | 2 | 1 | 4 |
| 7 | Kazakhstan | 1 | 1 | 2 | 4 |
| 8 | France | 1 | 1 | 1 | 3 |
| 9 | China* | 1 | 1 | 0 | 2 |
| 9 | Denmark | 1 | 1 | 0 | 2 |
| 11 | Hungary | 1 | 0 | 2 | 3 |
| 12 | Belgium | 1 | 0 | 0 | 1 |
| 12 | Sweden | 1 | 0 | 0 | 1 |
| 12 | Ukraine | 1 | 0 | 0 | 1 |
| 15 | Austria | 0 | 2 | 0 | 2 |
| 15 | Canada | 0 | 2 | 0 | 2 |
| 17 | Netherlands | 0 | 1 | 2 | 3 |
| 18 | Mongolia | 0 | 1 | 0 | 1 |
| 18 | Philippines | 0 | 1 | 0 | 1 |
| 18 | Portugal | 0 | 1 | 0 | 1 |
| 21 | Brazil | 0 | 0 | 1 | 1 |
| 21 | Colombia | 0 | 0 | 1 | 1 |
| 21 | Mexico | 0 | 0 | 1 | 1 |
| 21 | Montenegro | 0 | 0 | 1 | 1 |
| 21 | Saudi Arabia | 0 | 0 | 1 | 1 |
| Totals (25 entries) | | 19 | 19 | 19 | 57 |

== Medalists ==
=== Fighting ===
| Event | Gold | Silver | Bronze |
|---|---|---|---|
| Men's 62 kg | Bohdan Mochulskyi; Ukraine | Ecco van der Veer; Netherlands | Aslan Kanatbek; Kazakhstan |
| Men's 69 kg | Abu-bakir Zhanibek; Kazakhstan | Farid Ben Ali; France | Erasmo Pagano; Italy |
| Men's 77 kg | Lucas Andersen; Denmark | Nursultan Duisenkulov; Kazakhstan | Boy Vogelzang; Netherlands |
| Women's 52 kg | Estelle Gaspard; France | Antonella Farnè; Italy | Nuchanat Singchalad; Thailand |
| Women's 57 kg | Sophie Büscher; Germany | Rebekka Dahl; Denmark | Genevieve Bogers; Netherlands |
| Women's 63 kg | Orapa Senatham; Thailand | Chiara Fiorelli; Italy | Franziska Freudenberger; Germany |

=== Ne-Waza ===
| Event | Gold | Silver | Bronze |
|---|---|---|---|
| Men's 69 kg | Florian Bayili; Belgium | Mohamed Ali Alswaidi; United Arab Emirates | Joo Seong-hyeon; South Korea |
| Men's 77 kg | Nimrod Ryeder; Israel | Mahdi Al Awlaqi; United Arab Emirates | Seiilkhan Bolatbek; Kazakhstan |
| Men's 85 kg | Saeed Alkubaisi; United Arab Emirates | Pedro Ramalho; Portugal | Abdullah Nada; Saudi Arabia |
| Men's open | Nimrod Ryeder; Israel | Nathan dos Santos; Canada | Mohamed Al-Suwaidi; United Arab Emirates |
| Women's 52 kg | Im Eon-ju; South Korea | Kaila Napolis; Philippines | Pnina Aronov; Israel |
| Women's 57 kg | Astrid Schölin; Sweden | Felicia Marceau; Canada | Alexa Toth; Hungary |
| Women's 63 kg | Sung Ki-ra; South Korea | Meshi Rosenfeld; Israel | Stephanie Faure; France |
| Women's open | Tamara Toros; Hungary | Meshi Rosenfeld; Israel | Alexa Toth; Hungary |

=== Duo ===
| Event | Gold | Silver | Bronze |
|---|---|---|---|
| Show open | Thailand; Warut Netpong; Charatchai Kitpongsri | Austria; Gernot Riegl; Johannes Horak | Montenegro; Stefan Vukotić; Lidija Caković |
| Team open | Thailand; Warawut Saengsriruang; Lalita Yuennan | Austria; Gernot Riegl; Johannes Horak | Italy; Salah Ben Brahim; Elisa Marcantoni |

=== Duo for athletes with impairment ===
| Event | Gold | Silver | Bronze |
|---|---|---|---|
| Mental impairment | Italy; Pietro Napoli; Giovanni Napoli | Mongolia; Lkhaasuren Olonbayar; Ulziibat Ganganmurun | Brazil; Marcus Madruga; Mário Edson Oliveira Silva |
| Physical impairment | China; Li Yucai; Guo Ao | Germany; Alessandro Schober; Christine Jahn | Mexico; Manuel Alberto Cisneros; José Gilberto Moreno |
| Visual impairment | Germany; Nike Hunecke; Julia Paszkiewicz | China; Pan Tianyou; Wang Wenqiang | Colombia; Jeison Mora; Edgar Castillo |

== Participating nations ==
- Austria (6)
- Belgium (3)
- Brazil (5)
- Cambodia (2)
- Canada (3)
- China (4)
- Chinese Taipei (1)
- Colombia (6)
- Ivory Coast (1)
- Denmark (5)
- France (5)
- Germany (9)
- Greece (5)
- Hungary (2)
- Iraq (1)
- Israel (4)
- Italy (9)
- Kazakhstan (5)
- Mauritius (1)
- Mexico (2)
- Mongolia (4)
- Montenegro (2)
- Netherlands (3)
- Norway (1)
- Panama (1)
- Philippines (2)
- Portugal (1)
- Romania (8)
- Saudi Arabia (1)
- Slovenia (1)
- South Korea (4)
- Sweden (4)
- Switzerland (2)
- Thailand (7)
- Ukraine (2)
- United Arab Emirates (6)
- Uruguay (1)

Source: TWG 2025
