= Muaythai at the 2025 World Games =

- The pictogram of Muaythai.
- Venue: Sichuan Provincial Gymnasium
- Dates: 8–10 August
- No. of events: 6
- Competitors: 48 from 29 nations

The muaythai (Note: Muaythai is the official name of Muay Thai, recognized by International World Games Association and International Olympic Committee.) tournaments at the 2025 World Games in Chengdu, China were held from 8 to 10 August 2025 at the Sichuan Provincial Gymnasium. It was the third time of muaythai including in the World Games.

A total of 48 muaythai practitioners from 29 National Olympic Committees (NOCs) competed across six weight categories, with three divisions per gender.

== Competition format ==
The number of weight classes for both men and women was reduced from six to three while ensuring full gender equality. In the men's competition, the light middleweight, welterweight, light heavyweight, and heavyweight classes were removed. Meanwhile, in the women's competition, the flyweight, featherweight, and light welterweight classes were eliminated. Additionally, the men's cruiserweight class was introduced for the first time.

Men will contest matches in these three weight classes:

- Featherweight (57 kg)
- Light middleweight (71 kg)
- Cruiserweight (86 kg)

Women will contest matches in these three weight classes:

- Light flyweight (48 kg)
- Bantamweight (54 kg)
- Lightweight (60 kg)

== Qualification ==
A total of 48 muaythai practitioners could qualify for muaythai at the 2025 World Games. Each National Olympic Committee (NOC) could enter a maximum of three muaythai practitioners (one in each division). Host nation China has reserved a spot in each of all six events.

== Medal table ==
* Host nation (China)

Rank	Nation	Gold	Silver	Bronze	Total
1	China*	2	0	1	3
2	Individual Neutral Athletes	1	0	0	1
2	Mexico	1	0	0	1
2	Moldova	1	0	0	1
2	Ukraine	1	0	0	1
6	Thailand	0	1	1	2
7	Israel	0	1	0	1
7	Italy	0	1	0	1
7	Poland	0	1	0	1
7	Turkey	0	1	0	1
7	United States	0	1	0	1
12	France	0	0	1	1
12	Hungary	0	0	1	1
12	Morocco	0	0	1	1
12	Slovakia	0	0	1	1
Totals (15 entries)		6	6	6	18

== Events ==
=== Men ===
Event	Gold	Silver	Bronze
– 57 kg	Dmytro Shelesko; Ukraine	Ruach Gordon; Israel	Daren Rolland; France
– 71 kg	Konstantin Shakhtarin; Individual Neutral Athletes	Gianluca Franzosi; Italy	Attila Norbert Spéth; Hungary
– 86 kg	Artiom Livadari; Moldova	Aaron Ortiz; United States	Zhang Chengcheng; China

=== Women ===
Event	Gold	Silver	Bronze
– 48 kg	Liu Xiaohui; China	Kullanat Aonok; Thailand	Oumaima Belouarrat; Morocco
– 54 kg	Laura Burgos; Mexico	Martyna Kierczyńska; Poland	Monika Chochlíková; Slovakia
– 60 kg	Han Xin; China	Kübra Kocakuş; Turkey	Kaewrudee Kamtakrapoom; Thailand

== Participating nations ==
The following National Olympic Committees (NOCs) earned spots to compete, with the number of athletes in parentheses. 48 athletes from 31 NOCs are expected to participate. Host nation China are the only delegation to qualify the maximum number of entries (6 athletes total).

- Afghanistan (1)
- Armenia (1)
- Belgium (1)
- China (6)
- Croatia (1)
- Estonia (1)
- Finland (1)
- France (1)
- Hungary (3)
- Individual Neutral Athletes (3)
- Israel (2)
- Italy (1)
- Kazakhstan (1)
- Mexico (2)
- Moldova (1)
- Morocco (2)
- Philippines (1)
- Poland (2)
- Singapore (1)
- Slovakia (1)
- South Africa (1)
- Sweden (2)
- Thailand (2)
- Turkey (2)
- Ukraine (3)
- United Arab Emirates (1)
- United States (2)
- Uzbekistan (1)
- Vietnam (1)
