= Sambo at the 2025 World Games =

- Venue: Jianyang Cultural and Sports Centre Gymnasium
- Dates: 13–14 August
- No. of events: 11
- Competitors: 80 from 25 nations

The sambo competition at the 2025 World Games took place from 13 to 14 August 2025, in Chengdu in China, at the Jianyang Cultural and Sports Centre Gymnasium. The discipline included twelve events (six for men, six for women). It was the first appearance of the discipline since the 1993 games, and third overall.

== Qualification ==
A total of eight athletes qualified for each event, based on continental rankings.

NOC	Men					Women					Total
NOC	64 kg	71 kg	79 kg	88 kg	98 kg	54 kg	59 kg	65 kg	72 kg	80 kg	Total
Armenia	Yes		Yes		Yes	Yes	Yes				5
Australia				Yes							1
Cameroon			Yes		Yes				Yes		3
Colombia			Yes								1
Costa Rica							Yes			Yes	2
Croatia		Yes								Yes	2
Dominican Republic								Yes			1
Egypt		Yes				Yes	Yes			Yes	4
France						Yes					1
Individual Neutral Athletes	Yes	Yes	Yes	Yes	Yes	Yes	Yes 2	Yes	Yes		10
Israel								Yes	Yes		2
Italy	Yes										1
Jamaica				Yes							1
Kazakhstan	Yes	Yes	Yes	Yes		Yes	Yes	Yes	Yes	Yes	9
Kyrgyzstan	Yes	Yes		Yes	Yes	Yes				Yes	6
Mexico									Yes	Yes	2
Morocco	Yes			Yes				Yes			3
Mongolia							Yes		Yes		2
Netherlands					Yes						1
Philippines										Yes	1
Serbia		Yes									1
Ukraine	Yes	Yes	Yes	Yes	Yes			Yes	Yes		7
United States			Yes								1
Uzbekistan			Yes	Yes	Yes	Yes	Yes	Yes	Yes	Yes	8
Venezuela	Yes	Yes			Yes	Yes		Yes			5
Total: 25 NOCs	8	8	8	8	8	8	8	8	8	8	80

== Medal table ==
* Host nation (China)

Rank	Nation	Gold	Silver	Bronze	Total
1	Ukraine	4	0	2	6
2	Uzbekistan	3	2	3	8
3	Individual Neutral Athletes	2	4	1	7
4	Kazakhstan	1	3	0	4
5	Israel	1	0	1	2
6	Armenia	1	0	0	1
7	Mongolia	0	2	0	2
8	Venezuela	0	1	0	1
9	Kyrgyzstan	0	0	3	3
10	Cameroon	0	0	1	1
10	Philippines	0	0	1	1
Totals (11 entries)		12	12	12	36

== Medalists ==
=== Men ===
Event	Gold	Silver	Bronze
64 kg	Sheikh-Mansur Khabibulaev; Individual Neutral Athletes	Maratbek Rakhmetollin; Kazakhstan	Oleksandr Voropaiev; Ukraine
71 kg	Andrii Kucherenko; Ukraine	Rolan Zinnatov; Individual Neutral Athletes	Kurmanbek Zamirbek Uulu; Kyrgyzstan
79 kg	Vladyslav Rudniev; Ukraine	Ovanes Abgarian; Individual Neutral Athletes	Sharif Kushaev; Uzbekistan
88 kg	Petro Davydenko; Ukraine	Abusupiyan Alikhanov; Individual Neutral Athletes	Bekten Erkebai Uulu; Kyrgyzstan
98 kg	Arman Avanesyan; Armenia	Magomed Gasanov; Individual Neutral Athletes	Seidou Nji Mouluh; Cameroon
Team	Ukraine; Oleksandr Voropaiev; Andrii Kucherenko; Vladyslav Rudniev; Petro Davydenko; Anatolii Voloshynov	Kazakhstan; Maratbek Rakhmetollin; Niyetkhan Toleukhan; Bakytzhan Duisembekov; Tanirbergen Tergeubekov	Uzbekistan; Sokhibjon Khasanboev; Sharif Kushaev; Ozodbek Murotov

=== Women ===
Event	Gold	Silver	Bronze
54 kg	Gulsevar Urakova; Uzbekistan	Luisaigna Campos; Venezuela	Akak Uson Kyzy; Kyrgyzstan
59 kg	Shakhzoda Azatova; Uzbekistan	Enkhbaataryn Nomintuyaa; Mongolia	Nina Serdiuk; Individual Neutral Athletes
65 kg	Sofia Istomina; Individual Neutral Athletes	Feruza Bobokulova; Uzbekistan	Nili Block; Israel
72 kg	Shaked Nisimian; Israel	Uran-Ölziin Anujin; Mongolia	Madinabonu Salokhiddinova; Uzbekistan
80 kg	Ulbossyn Adilova; Kazakhstan	Mavluda Abdullaeva; Uzbekistan	Aislinn Agnes Yap; Philippines
Team	Uzbekistan; Mavluda Abdullaeva; Gulsevar Urakova; Shakhzoda Azatova; Feruza Bobokulova; Madinabonu Salokhiddinova	Kazakhstan; Ainur Akzhigitova; Kuralay Kabraikyzy; Marzhan Bizak; Aruzhan Kenessary; Ulbossyn Adilova	Ukraine; Yevheniia Pozdnia; Anhelina Lysenko
