= South Korea at the 2025 World Games =

- IOC code: KOR
- NOC: Korean Sport & Olympic Committee

in Chengdu, China 7 August 2025 – 17 August 2025
- Competitors: 53 (29 men and 24 women) in 14 sports and 56 events
- Medals Ranked 17th: Gold 5 Silver 2 Bronze 7 Total 14

World Games appearances
- 1981; 1985; 1989; 1993; 1997; 2001; 2005; 2009; 2013; 2017; 2022; 2025

South Korea will compete at the 2025 World Games held in Chengdu, China from 7 to 17 August 2025. Athletes representing South Korea won five gold medals, two silver medals and seven bronze medals. The country finished in 17th place in the medal table.

== Medalists ==
Medal	Name	Sport	Event	Date
Gold	Im Eon-ju	Ju-jitsu	Women's 52 kg Ne-Waza	10 August
Gold	Sung Ki-ra	Ju-jitsu	Women's 63 kg Ne-Waza	10 August
Gold	Shin Myeong-jun	Finswimming	Men's 50 metre apnoea	11 August
Gold	Song Gi-cheol	Wushu	Men's 70 kg	12 August
Gold	Cho Myung-woo	Billiard sports	Men's carom three cushion	14 August
Silver	Seo Ui-jin	Finswimming	Women's 50 metre apnoea	10 August
Silver	Lee Jun-kyu; Koh Eun-byeol; Kim Min-hyeok; Kim Eung-soo; Kim Hyeog-jin; Jung Sung-bo; Park Hye-won; Jeong Sung-chan	Aerobic gymnastics	Aerobic dance	16 August
Bronze	Moon Joo-hee	Wakeboarding	Women's skim	10 August
Bronze	Yoon Mi-ri	Finswimming	Women's 50 metre apnoea	10 August
Bronze	Kim Yun-seo	Wakeboarding	Men's freestyle	10 August
Bronze	Joo Seong Hyeon	Ju-jitsu	Men's 69 kg Ne-Waza	11 August
Bronze	Shin Myeong-jun; Lee Dong-jin; Jang Hyoung-ho; Kwon Nam-ho	Finswimming	Men's 4x100 metre surface relay	11 August
Bronze	Kim Min-jae	Air sports	Drone racing	16 August
Bronze	Jeong Ji-min; Sung Han-areum	Sport climbing	Women's speed relay	16 August

Medals by sport
Sport	1st place, gold medalist(s)	2nd place, silver medalist(s)	3rd place, bronze medalist(s)	Total
Ju-jitsu	2	0	1	3
Finswimming	1	1	2	4
Billiard sports	1	0	0	1
Wushu	1	0	0	1
Aerobic gymnastics	0	1	0	1
Wakeboarding	0	0	2	2
Air sports	0	0	1	1
Sport climbing	0	0	1	1
Total	5	2	7	14

== Competitors ==
The following is the list of number of competitors in the Games.

Sport	Men	Women	Total
Air sports	3	0	3
Archery	1	1	2
Billards	2	0	2
Canoe dragon boat	6	6	12
Kickboxing	1	0	1
Dancesport	1	1	2
Ju-jitsu	2	2	4
Powerboating	2	2	4
Racquetball	1	1	2
Roller sports	1	1	2
Sport climbing	0	4	4
Underwater sports	4	4	8
Wakeboarding	2	2	4
Wushu	3	0	3
Total	29	24	53

== Racquetball ==
Athlete	Event	Round of 16	Quarterfinal	Semifinal	Final / BM	
Athlete	Event	Opposition Result	Opposition Result	Opposition Result	Opposition Result	Rank
Gunhee Lee	Men's singles					
Sumin Lee	Women's singles					
Gunhee Lee; Sumin Lee	Double					
