= Aerobic gymnastics at the 2025 World Games =

- Venue: Dong'an Lake Sports Park Gymnasium
- Dates: 15–16 August 2025
- No. of events: 4
- Competitors: 81 from 14 nations

The aerobic gymnastics competition at the 2025 World Games took place from 15 to 16 August 2025 at the Dong'an Lake Sports Park Gymnasium in Chengdu, China. The discipline included four events.

== Qualification ==
A total of six pairs/groups qualified for each event. The 2024 Aerobic Gymnastics World Championships served as the main qualifying event, providing with five of the six spots. The remaining one came as a wildcard.

== Participating nations ==
- Australia (8)
- Azerbaijan (2)
- Brazil (2)
- Bulgaria (3)
- China (12)
- France (5)
- Hungary (7)
- Italy (12)
- Japan (2)
- South Korea (8)
- Romania (10)
- Spain (5)
- Vietnam (3)
- Ukraine (2)

== Medal table ==
* Host nation (China)

Rank	Nation	Gold	Silver	Bronze	Total
1	China*	2	0	1	3
2	Hungary	1	0	0	1
2	Japan	1	0	0	1
4	Italy	0	2	0	2
5	Azerbaijan	0	1	0	1
5	South Korea	0	1	0	1
7	Bulgaria	0	0	1	1
7	Romania	0	0	1	1
7	Ukraine	0	0	1	1
Totals (9 entries)		4	4	4	12

== Events ==
Event	Gold	Silver	Bronze
Aerobic dance	Hungary; Antónia Kőnig; Zoltán Lőcsei; Fruzsina Fejér; Anna Makranszki; Vanessza Rusicska; Tünde Himmel; Kamilla Goda; András Mikulecz	South Korea; Lee Jun-kyu; Koh Eun-byeol; Kim Min-hyeok; Kim Eung-soo; Kim Hyeog-jin; Jung Sung-bo; Park Hye-won; Jeong Sung-chan	China; Liang Weijun; He Yushu; Chen Hongji; Tuo Shuyi; Huang Chengkai; Teng Hao; Zhang Qingzhou; Xu Tong
Pairs	Japan; Riri Kitazume; Mizuki Saito	Azerbaijan; Vladimir Dolmatov; Madina Mustafayeva	Ukraine; Anastasiia Kurashvili; Stanislav Halaida
Trios	China; Fan Siwei; Zhang Qingzhou; Wang Zhenhao	Italy; Davide Nacci; Francesco Sebastio; Sara Cutini	Bulgaria; Hristo Manolov; Antonio Papazov; Borislava Ivanova
Groups	China; Fan Siwei; Feng Lei; Liang Wenjie; Teng Hao; Xu Tong	Italy; Marcello Patteri; Davide Nacci; Francesco Sebastio; Matteo Falera; Sara Cutini	Romania; Leonard Manta; Daniel Țavoc; Darius Branda; Vlăduț Popa; Claudia Ristea
