= Canoe marathon at the 2025 World Games =

- Venue: Xinglong Lake
- Dates: 9–10 August
- No. of events: 4
- Competitors: 40 from 25 nations

The canoe marathon competition at the 2025 World Games took place from 9 to 10 August 2025, in Chengdu in China, at the Qinglong Lake. The competition will have four events (two short distance and two long distance).

== Qualification ==
A total of 40 canoeists qualified (20 men and 20 women). Aside from the quota destined to the host nation, 38 athletes qualified following their performance at the 2024 ICF Canoe Marathon World Championships.

== Participating nations ==
- Argentina (2)
- Australia (2)
- Belgium (1)
- China (2)
- Czech Republic (2)
- Denmark (2)
- Estonia (1)
- France (2)
- Germany (2)
- Great Britain (2)
- Hungary (2)
- Ireland (1)
- Italy (2)
- Japan (2)
- Netherlands (2)
- Norway (1)
- New Zealand (1)
- Poland (1)
- Portugal (2)
- Serbia (1)
- Slovakia (1)
- South Africa (2)
- Spain (2)
- Sweden (1)
- Ukraine (1)

== Medal table ==
* Host nation (China)

| Rank | Nation | Gold | Silver | Bronze | Total |
|---|---|---|---|---|---|
| 1 | Denmark | 2 | 0 | 1 | 3 |
| 2 | Sweden | 2 | 0 | 0 | 2 |
| 3 | Hungary | 0 | 2 | 0 | 2 |
| 3 | South Africa | 0 | 2 | 0 | 2 |
| 5 | Portugal | 0 | 0 | 2 | 2 |
| 6 | Italy | 0 | 0 | 1 | 1 |
| Totals (6 entries) | | 4 | 4 | 4 | 12 |

== Medalists ==
=== Men ===
| Event | Gold | Silver | Bronze |
|---|---|---|---|
| K-1 Short Distance | Mads Pedersen; Denmark | Hamish Lovemore; South Africa | José Ramalho; Portugal |
| K-1 Long Distance | Mads Pedersen; Denmark | Hamish Lovemore; South Africa | José Ramalho; Portugal |

=== Women ===
| Event | Gold | Silver | Bronze |
|---|---|---|---|
| K-1 Short Distance | Melina Andersson; Sweden | Vanda Kiszli; Hungary | Susanna Cicali; Italy |
| K-1 Long Distance | Melina Andersson; Sweden | Vanda Kiszli; Hungary | Pernille Hostrup; Denmark |
