= Konstantin Shakhtarin =

Russian kickboxer

- Born: July 9, 2002 (age 24); Perm Krai, Russia
- Native name: Константин Шахтарин
- Height: 1.83 m (6 ft 0 in)
- Weight: 71 kg (157 lb; 11.2 st)
- Style: Muay Thai
- Stance: Orthodox
- Fighting out of: Solikamsk, Russia
- Team: Arkangel Mikhail (2026-)
- Trainer: Fedor Savelyev

Other information
- Notable schools: Tchaikovsky State Academy of Physical Culture and Sports

Konstantin Shakhtarin
Medal record

Men's Muay Thai

Representing Russia

World Games
Gold medal – first place	2025 Chengdu	71 kg

World Combat Games
Gold medal – first place	2023 Riyadh	71 kg

IFMA World Championships
Gold medal – first place	2026 Kuala Lumpur	71 kg
Gold medal – first place	2025 Kemer	71 kg
Gold medal – first place	2024 Patras	71 kg
Gold medal – first place	2023 Bangkok	71 kg

IFMA World Youth Championships
Gold medal – first place	2021 Bangkok	71 kg
Silver medal – second place	2018 Bangkok	
Gold medal – first place	2017 Bangkok	48 kg

IFMA European Youth Championships
Gold medal – first place	2022 Istanbul	71 kg
Bronze medal – third place	2019 Minsk	63.5 kg

CIS Games
Gold medal – first place	2023 Vitebsk	71 kg
Gold medal – first place	2021 Kazan	71 kg

Konstantin Shakhtarin is a Russian Muay Thai fighter. He is a four time IFMA World Champion and a World Games gold medalist in Muay Thai. As a professional he is the reigning WMC European Middleweight Champion.

== Career ==
On February 2, 2023, Shakhtarin faced Sergey Kosykh at Muaythai Factory. He lost the fight by unanimous decision.

On October 16, 2025, Shakhtarin faced Bryton Mabel at the Muaythai Friendship Cup in Moscow, Russia, for the WMC European Middleweight title. He won the fight by second-round technical knockout.

In 2026, after winning his fourth IFMA World Championship Gold medal, Shakhtarin was awarded the title of Master of Sports of Russia.

On May 27, 2026, Shakhtarin made his Karate Combat debut at Karate Combat 60 where he faced Eldar Vakhrushev. He won the fight by first-round knockout.

On August 1, 2026, Shakhtarin faced Armando Rosario from Spain at K-1 World GP 2027 Qualifier in Yekaterinburg - RCC Fair Fight 35. He won the fight by second-round knockout with a left elbow strike.

On September 25, 2026, Shakhtarin made his ONE Championship against Enzo Kartoum on ONE The Inner Circle 32 at the Lumpinee Stadium. He won the fight by first-round knockout with a spinning back elbow.

== Championships and accomplishments ==
=== Professional ===
- World Muaythai Council
  - 2025 WMC European Middleweight (-72.5 kg) Champion

=== Amateur ===
- World Games
  - 2025 World Games Muay Thai 71 kg (gold)
- World Combat Games
  - 2023 World Combat Games Muay Thai 71 kg (gold)
- International Federation of Muaythai Associations
  - 2026 IFMA World Championship -71 kg (gold)
  - 2025 IFMA World Championship -71 kg (gold)
  - 2024 IFMA World Championship -71 kg (gold)
  - 2023 IFMA World Championship -71 kg (gold)
  - 2022 IFMA European Championship U23 -71 kg (gold)
  - 2021 IFMA World Youth Championship U23 -71 kg (gold)
  - 2019 IFMA European Championship Junior (16-17) -63.5 kg (bronze)
  - 2018 IFMA World Youth Championship Junior (16-17) (silver)
  - 2017 IFMA World Youth Championship Junior (14-15) -48 kg (gold)
- CIS Games
  - 2021 CIS Games Muay Thai -71 kg (gold)
  - 2023 CIS Games Muay Thai -71 kg (gold)
- Russian Muaythai Federation
  - 3x Russian Muay Thai Championship -71 kg Runner-up (2021, 2022, 2025)
  - 2x Russian Muay Thai Championship -71 kg Winner (2023, 2024)

=== Awards ===
- Russian Union of Martial Arts
  - 2026 Golden Belt National Awards Athlete of the Year

== Karate Combat record ==
Professional record breakdown
1 match	1 win	0 losses
By knockout	1	0
By decision	0	0

Res.	Record	Opponent	Method	Event	Date	Round	Time	Location	Notes
Win	1–0	Eldar Vakhrushev	TKO (punches)	Karate Combat 60	May 27, 2026	1		Yekaterinburg, Russia	

== Muay Thai and Kickboxing record ==
Professional Muay Thai and Kickboxing record
9 Wins (7 (T)KOs), 3 Losses, 0 Draw
Date	Result	Opponent	Event	Location	Method	Round	Time
2026-09-25	Win	(Algeria) Enzo Kartoum	ONE The Inner Circle 32, Lumpinee Stadium	Bangkok, Thailand	KO (spinning back elbow)	1	1:58
2026-08-01	Win	(Spain) Armando Rosario	K-1 World GP 2027 Qualifier in Yekaterinburg - RCC Fair Fight 35	Yekaterinburg, Russia	KO (left elbow)	2	
2026-05-17	Win	(Thailand) Beckham Tanapchat	RCC Muay Thai	Yekaterinburg, Russia	KO (spinning back elbow)	1	0:53
2025-10-16	Win	(France) Bryton Mabel	Muaythai Friendship Cup	Moscow, Russia	TKO (referee stoppage)	2	
Won the vacant WMC European Middleweight (-72.5kg) title.
2025-04-12	Win	(Armenia) David Avetisyan	RCC Fair Fight 30	Yekaterinburg, Russia	KO (left cross)	2	1:32
2023-11-24	Win	(Tunisia) Sabri Ben Henia	Adrenaline Muay Thai	Chelyabinsk, Russia	KO (spinning back elbow)	2	1:05
2023-02-02	Loss	(Russia) Sergey Kosykh	Muaythai Factory	Kemerovo, Russia	Decision (unanimous)	5	3:00
2022-11-17	Win	(Russia) Nikita Gerasimovich	Muaythai Factory	Kemerovo, Russia	TKO (corner stoppage)	3	0:42
2022-03-27	Loss	(Georgia (country)) Giorgi Malania	Ural FC 1	Perm, Russia	Decision (unanimous)	3	3:00
2021-10-30	Loss	(Russia) Dmitry Changeliya	Muaythai Factory	Kemerovo, Russia	Decision (unanimous)	3	3:00
2021-02-24	Win	(Russia) Varaksin	Kuzmenok Promotion	Russia	Decision (unanimous)	3	3:00
Legend: Win Loss Draw/No contest Notes

Amateur Muay Thai record
Date	Result	Opponent	Event	Location	Method	Round	Time
2026-06-25	Win	(Belarus) Yauheniy Fedarynchyk	IFMA 2026 World Championships, Final	Kuala Lumpur, Malaysia	Decision (30:27)	3	3:00
Wins the 2026 IFMA World Championships −71kg Gold Medal.
2026-06-24	Win	(Singapore) Jeryl Khoo	2026 IFMA World Championships, Semifinals	Kuala Lumpur, Malaysia	TKO	1	
2026-06-23	Win	(Chinese Taipei) Jin-Cheng Lin	2026 IFMA World Championships, Quarterfinals	Kuala Lumpur, Malaysia	TKO	1	
2026-06-22	Win	(China) Yunlong Liu	2026 IFMA World Championships, Second Round	Kuala Lumpur, Malaysia	TKO	2	
2026-06-21	Win	(Sweden) Daniel Lejonstad	2026 IFMA World Championships, First Round	Kuala Lumpur, Malaysia	TKO	2	
2025-08-10	Win	(Italy) Gianluca Franzosi	2025 World Games, Final	Chengdu, China	Decision (30:26)	3	3:00
Wins the 2025 World Games Muay Thai −71kg Gold Medal.
2025-08-09	Win	(Hungary) Attila Norbert Spéth	2025 World Games, Semifinals	Chengdu, China	Decision (30:27)	3	3:00
2025-08-08	Win	(Israel) Maxim Branis	2025 World Games, Quarterfinals	Chengdu, China	Decision (30:27)	3	3:00
2025-05-31	Win	(Ukraine) Oleksandr Yefimenko	IFMA 2025 World Championships, Final	Kemer, Turkey	Decision (30:26)	3	3:00
Wins the 2025 IFMA World Championships −71kg Gold Medal.
2025-05-30	Win	(Greece) Pavlos Bamis	2025 IFMA World Championships, Semifinals	Kemer, Turkey	TKO	1	
2025-05-29	Win	(Canada) Brian Singson	2025 IFMA World Championships, Quarterfinals	Kemer, Turkey	TKO	2	
2025-05-26	Win	(Belarus) Yauheniy Fedarynchyk	2025 IFMA World Championships, First Round	Kemer, Turkey	Decision (30:27)	3	3:00
2025-02-22	Loss	(Russia) Guseyn Aliev	2025 Russian Muay Thai Championship, Final	Yekaterinburg, Russia	Decision	3	3:00
Wins the 2025 Russian Muay Thai Championship −71kg Silver Medal.
2025-02-20	Win	(Russia) Danil Morgachev	2025 Russian Muay Thai Championship, Semifinals	Yekaterinburg, Russia	TKO	2	
2025-02-19	Win	(Russia) Ruslan Boltaev	2025 Russian Muay Thai Championship, Quarterfinals	Yekaterinburg, Russia	TKO	1	
2024-06-09	Win	(Thailand) Thanet Nitutorn	2024 IFMA World Championships, Final	Patras, Greece	Decision (30:27)	3	3:00
Wins the 2024 IFMA World Championships −71kg Gold Medal.
2024-06-07	Win	(Israel) Maxim Branis	2024 IFMA World Championships, Semifinals	Patras, Greece	Decision (30:27)	3	3:00
2024-06-06	Win	(Ukraine) Oleksandr Yefimenko	2024 IFMA World Championships, Quarterfinals	Patras, Greece	TKO	2	
2024-06-04	Win	(United States) Jordan Hankerson	2024 IFMA World Championships, First Round	Patras, Greece	TKO	3	
2024-03-10	Win	(Russia) Vladimir Tulaev	2024 Russian Muay Thai Championship, Final	Nizhny Novgorod, Russia	Decision	3	3:00
Wins the 2024 Russian Muay Thai Championship −71kg Gold Medal.
2023-10-30	Win	(Thailand) Thanet Nitutorn	2023 World Combat Games, Grand Final	Riyadh, Saudi Arabia	Decision (30:27)	3	3:00
Wins the 2023 World Combat Games Muay Thai −71kg Gold Medal.
2023-10-29	Win	(Thailand) Thanet Nitutorn	2023 World Combat Games, Winner bracket Semifinals	Riyadh, Saudi Arabia	Decision (30:27)	3	3:00
2023-10-28	Win	(France) Dany Njiba	2023 World Combat Games, Quarterfinals	Riyadh, Saudi Arabia	Decision (30:26)	3	3:00
2023-08-13	Win	(Uzbekistan) Abdulfattokh Aliakbarov	2023 CIS Games, Final	Vitebsk, Belarus	Decision	3	3:00
Wins the 2023 CIS Games Muay Thai −71kg Gold Medal.
2023-08-12	Win	(Belarus) Ruslan Kyamalov	2023 CIS Games, Semifinals	Vitebsk, Belarus	TKO		
2023-05-12	Win	(Thailand) Thotsaphon Saophanao	IFMA 2023 World Championships, Final	Bangkok, Thailand	Decision (30:27)	3	3:00
Wins the 2023 IFMA World Championships −71kg Gold Medal.
2023-05-10	Win	(Morocco) Abdelali Zahidi	2023 IFMA World Championships, Semifinals	Bangkok, Thailand	Decision (29:28)	3	3:00
2023-05-08	Win	(Israel) Ruslan Fradkin	2023 IFMA World Championships, Quarterfinals	Bangkok, Thailand	Decision (29:28)	3	3:00
2023-05-08	Win	(South Africa) Marlinn Watton	2023 IFMA World Championships, First Round	Bangkok, Thailand	TKO	1	
2023-03-19	Win	(Russia) Vladimir Tulaev	2023 Russian Muay Thai Championship, Final	Magnitogorsk, Russia	Decision (29:28)	3	3:00
Wins the 2023 Russian Muay Thai Championship −71kg Gold Medal.
2023-03-19	Win	(Russia) Magomedkhabib Musaev	2023 Russian Muay Thai Championship, Semifinals	Magnitogorsk, Russia	TKO	1	
2023-03-17	Win	(Russia) Alexander Skvortsov	2023 Russian Muay Thai Championship, Quarterfinals	Magnitogorsk, Russia	Decision (30:27)	3	3:00
2023-03-15	Win	(Russia) Roman Makeev	2023 Russian Muay Thai Championship, First Round	Magnitogorsk, Russia	Decision (30:26)	3	3:00
2022-03-27	Loss	(Russia) Dmitry Changeliya	2022 Russian Muay Thai Championship, Final	Ulan-Ude, Russia	Walkover		
Wins the 2022 Russian Muay Thai Championship −71kg Silver Medal.
2022-03-25	Win	(Russia) Magomedrasul Magomedov	2022 Russian Muay Thai Championship, Semifinals	Ulan-Ude, Russia	Decision (30:27)	3	3:00
2022-03-24	Win	(Russia) Vladimir Tulaev	2022 Russian Muay Thai Championship, Quarterfinals	Ulan-Ude, Russia	Decision (30:27)	3	3:00
2022-02-20	Win	(Portugal) Gonçalo Noites	2022 IFMA European Championships, Final	Istanbul, Turkey	Decision (30:27)	3	3:00
Wins the 2022 IFMA European Championships U23 −71kg Gold Medal.
2022-02-19	Win	(Denmark) Oguzhan Türkalp Kekec	2022 IFMA European Championships, Semifinals	Istanbul, Turkey	Walkover		
2022-02-18	Win	(Hungary) Alex Bordás	2022 IFMA European Championships, Quarterfinals	Istanbul, Turkey	Decision (30:27)	3	3:00
2021-12-11	Win	(Ukraine) Oleksandr Yefimenko	2021 IFMA World Championships, Final	Bangkok, Thailand	Decision (30:27)	3	3:00
Wins the 2021 IFMA World Championships U23 −71kg Gold Medal.
2021-12-10	Win	(Peru) Joaquín Fernández	2021 IFMA World Championships, Semifinals	Bangkok, Thailand	Decision (30:27)	3	3:00
2021-12-08	Win	(Kazakhstan) Ruslan Zayakin	2021 IFMA World Championships, Quarterfinals	Bangkok, Thailand	Decision (30:27)	3	3:00
2021-12-06	Win	(Belarus) Siamion Stupakevich	2021 IFMA World Championships, First Round	Bangkok, Thailand	TKO	3	
2021-09-08	Win	(Kazakhstan) Ruslan Zayakin	2021 CIS Games, Final	Kazan, Russia	Decision (30:27)	3	3:00
Wins the 2021 CIS Games Muay Thai U23 −71kg Gold Medal.
2021-09-07	Win	(Tajikistan) Amonjon Daminov	2021 CIS Games, Semifinals	Kazan, Russia	TKO	1	
2021-09-06	Win	(Belarus) Siamion Stupakevich	2021 CIS Games, Quarterfinals	Kazan, Russia	Decision (30:27)	3	3:00
2021-04-30	Loss	(Russia) Ilya Balanov	2021 Russian Muay Thai Championship, Final	Kemerovo, Russia	Decision (29:28)	3	3:00
Wins the 2021 Russian Muay Thai Championship −71kg Silver Medal.
2021-04-28	Win	(Russia) Dmitry Changeliya	2021 Russian Muay Thai Championship, Semifinals	Kemerovo, Russia	Decision (30:27)	3	3:00
2021-04-27	Win	(Russia) David Kalandia	2021 Russian Muay Thai Championship, Quarterfinals	Kemerovo, Russia	Decision (30:27)	3	3:00
2021-04-26	Win	(Russia) Maxim Bakhtin	2021 Russian Muay Thai Championship, First Round	Kemerovo, Russia	Decision (30:27)	3	3:00
Legend: Win Loss Draw/No contest Notes

== See also ==
- List of male kickboxers
