= Karate at the 2025 World Games =

- Venue: Jianyang Cultural and Sports Centre Gymnasium
- Dates: 8–9 August
- No. of events: 12
- Competitors: 95 from 37 nations

The karate competition at the 2025 World Games took place from 8 to 9 August 2025, in Chengdu in China, at the Jianyang Cultural and Sports Centre Gymnasium. The discipline had twelve events, six for men and six for women.

== Qualification ==
A total of eight karatekas qualified for each event. Three spots were given at the 2023 World Karate Championships, other three came from the WKF World Rankings. The remaining two were given to the host nation and a continental quota.

== Medal table ==
* Host nation (China)

Rank	Nation	Gold	Silver	Bronze	Total
1	Germany	2	0	0	2
2	Japan	1	5	2	8
3	Ukraine	1	1	0	2
4	Iran	1	0	1	2
4	Jordan	1	0	1	2
6	China*	1	0	0	1
6	France	1	0	0	1
6	Hong Kong	1	0	0	1
6	Morocco	1	0	0	1
6	Switzerland	1	0	0	1
6	Turkey	1	0	0	1
12	Croatia	0	2	1	3
13	Spain	0	1	1	2
14	Azerbaijan	0	1	0	1
14	Kazakhstan	0	1	0	1
14	United States	0	1	0	1
17	Egypt	0	0	2	2
17	Italy	0	0	2	2
19	Chile	0	0	1	1
19	Greece	0	0	1	1
Totals (20 entries)		12	12	12	36

== Medalists ==
=== Men ===
Event	Gold	Silver	Bronze
Kata	Kakeru Nishiyama; Japan	Ariel Torres; United States	Alessio Ghinami; Italy
Kumite 60 kg	Eray Şamdan; Turkey	Hiromu Hashimoto; Japan	Christos-Stefanos Xenos; Greece
Kumite 67 kg	Said Oubaya; Morocco	Yugo Kozaki; Japan	Abdelrahman Al-Masatfa; Jordan
Kumite 75 kg	Enzo Berthon; France	Yusei Sakiyama; Japan	Abdalla Abdelaziz; Egypt
Kumite 84 kg	Mohammad Al-Jafari; Jordan	Ivan Kvesić; Croatia	Rikito Shimada; Japan
Kumite +84 kg	Ryzvan Talibov; Ukraine	Anđelo Kvesić; Croatia	Saleh Abazari; Iran

=== Women ===
Event	Gold	Silver	Bronze
Kata	Grace Lau; Hong Kong	Maho Ono; Japan	Paola García; Spain
Kumite 50 kg	Sara Bahmanyar; Iran	Moldir Zhangbyrbay; Kazakhstan	Ema Sgardelli; Croatia
Kumite 55 kg	Mia Bitsch; Germany	Anzhelika Terliuga; Ukraine	Valentina Toro; Chile
Kumite 61 kg	Gong Li; China	Sarara Shimada; Japan	Noursin Ali; Egypt
Kumite 68 kg	Elena Quirici; Switzerland	Irina Zaretska; Azerbaijan	Tsubasa Kama; Japan
Kumite +68 kg	Johanna Kneer; Germany	María Torres; Spain	Clio Ferracuti; Italy

== Participating nations ==
- Algeria (1)
- Aruba (1)
- Australia (2)
- Azerbaijan (1)
- Brazil (1)
- Canada (2)
- Chile (1)
- China (11)
- Colombia (1)
- Croatia (3)
- Egypt (6)
- France (5)
- Germany (3)
- Greece (2)
- Hong Kong (1)
- Hungary (1)
- Individual Neutral Athletes (1)
- Indonesia (1)
- Iran (3)
- Italy (5)
- Japan (9)
- Jordan (2)
- Kazakhstan (6)
- Kuwait (1)
- Montenegro (1)
- Morocco (2)
- Netherlands (1)
- Slovakia (1)
- Saudi Arabia (1)
- Spain (2)
- Switzerland (1)
- Sweden (1)
- Tunisia (1)
- Turkey (6)
- Venezuela (1)
- Ukraine (4)
- United States (3)
