= Kickboxing at the 2025 World Games =

- Venue: Sichuan Provincial Gymnasium
- Dates: 12–14 August 2025
- No. of events: 12
- Competitors: 96 from 48 nations

The kickboxing competition at the 2025 World Games took place from 12 to 14 August 2025 at the Sichuan Provincial Gymnasium in Chengdu, China. The discipline had twelve events, six for men and six for women. Six point fighting events were added to the six K1 style events that took place during the previous games.

== Qualification ==
A total of eight athletes qualified for each event. Multiple qualification events took place during various continental competitions.

== Medal table ==
* Host nation (China)

Rank	Nation	Gold	Silver	Bronze	Total
1	Israel	2	1	0	3
2	Ukraine	2	0	2	4
3	Hungary	2	0	0	2
4	Italy	1	1	1	3
5	Netherlands	1	0	1	2
6	Austria	1	0	0	1
6	Great Britain	1	0	0	1
6	Greece	1	0	0	1
6	Portugal	1	0	0	1
10	Bulgaria	0	2	1	3
11	Turkey	0	2	0	2
12	Azerbaijan	0	1	0	1
12	Czech Republic	0	1	0	1
12	Germany	0	1	0	1
12	Guatemala	0	1	0	1
12	Mexico	0	1	0	1
12	Slovakia	0	1	0	1
18	Slovenia	0	0	2	2
18	Uzbekistan	0	0	2	2
20	Canada	0	0	1	1
20	Serbia	0	0	1	1
20	United States	0	0	1	1
Totals (22 entries)		12	12	12	36

== Medalists ==
=== K1 style ===
Event	Gold	Silver	Bronze
Men's 63.5 kg	Hlib Mazur; Ukraine	Amin Guliyev; Azerbaijan	Asilbek Sodikov; Uzbekistan
Men's 75 kg	Osaid Jodah; Israel	Dimitar Stoyanov; Bulgaria	Anthony Schleicher; United States
Men's 91 kg	Roman Shcherbatiuk; Ukraine	Emin Özer; Turkey	Khusankhon Baratov; Uzbekistan
Women's 52 kg	Yulia Sachkov; Israel	Klára Strnadová; Czech Republic	Daryna Ivanova; Ukraine
Women's 60 kg	Valence Bickel; Netherlands	Lucia Cmárová; Slovakia	Alina Martyniuk; Ukraine
Women's 70 kg	Catarina Dias; Portugal	Polina Grossman; Israel	Aleksandra Krstić; Serbia

=== Point fighting ===
Event	Gold	Silver	Bronze
Men's 63 kg	Roland Veres; Hungary	Gabriele Lanzilao; Italy	Borislav Radulov; Bulgaria
Men's 74 kg	Erik Zimmermann; Austria	José Santiago Bendfeldt; Guatemala	Carvin Guiliano Burke; Netherlands
Men's 84 kg	Dimitrios Economo; Greece	Hector Solorio; Mexico	Dwayne Morin; Canada
Women's 50 kg	Federica Trovalusci; Italy	Aybüke Kılınç; Turkey	Tyra Barada; Slovenia
Women's 60 kg	Evelyn Neyens; Great Britain	Aleksandra Georgieva; Bulgaria	Francesca Ceci; Italy
Women's 70 kg	Andrea Busa; Hungary	Stefanie Megerle; Germany	Tina Baloh; Slovenia

== Participating nations ==
- Algeria (1)
- Argentina (1)
- Australia (1)
- Austria (2)
- Azerbaijan (1)
- Brazil (4)
- Bulgaria (3)
- Canada (2)
- Chile (1)
- China (5)
- Czech Republic (1)
- Egypt (2)
- France (1)
- Great Britain (3)
- Germany (2)
- Greece (2)
- Guatemala (2)
- Hungary (6)
- Indonesia (2)
- Iran (1)
- Ireland (1)
- Iraq (1)
- Israel (3)
- Italy (3)
- Madagascar (1)
- Morocco (2)
- Moldova (1)
- Mexico (3)
- Netherlands (2)
- New Zealand (2)
- Philippines (1)
- Poland (2)
- Portugal (3)
- South Africa (5)
- Serbia (1)
- Slovenia (2)
- Slovakia (2)
- Switzerland (1)
- Thailand (1)
- Turkey (3)
- Ukraine (4)
- United States (1)
- Uzbekistan (7)
- Vietnam (1)
