= Uzbekistan at the 2025 World Games =

- IOC code: UZB
- NOC: National Olympic Committee of the Republic of Uzbekistan

in Chengdu, China 7 August 2025 – 17 August 2025
- Competitors: 20 (11 men and 9 women) in 4 sports and 22 events
- Medals Ranked 26th: Gold 3 Silver 3 Bronze 5 Total 11

World Games appearances
- 1981; 1985; 1989; 1993; 1997; 2001; 2005; 2009; 2013; 2017; 2022; 2025

Uzbekistan competed at the 2025 World Games held in Chengdu, China from 7 to 17 August 2025.

Athletes representing Uzbekistan won three gold medals, three silver medals and five bronze medals. The country finished in 26th place in the medal table.

== Medalists ==
Medal	Name	Sport	Event	Date
Gold	Shakhzoda Azatova	Sambo	Women's 59 kg	13 August
Gold	Gulsevar Urakova	Sambo	Women's 54 kg	14 August
Gold	Uzbekistan women's national sambo team: Shakhzoda Azatova; Gulsevar Urakova; Madinabonu Salokhiddinova; Mavluda Abdullaeva; Feruza Bobokulova	Sambo	Women's team	14 August
Silver	Darya Latisheva	Wushu	Women's nanquan / nandao	9 August
Silver	Feruza Bobokulova	Sambo	Women's 65 kg	13 August
Silver	Mavluda Abdullaeva	Sambo	Women's 80 kg	14 August
Bronze	Sharif Kushaev	Sambo	Men's 79 kg	13 August
Bronze	Madinabonu Salokhiddinova	Sambo	Women's 72 kg	13 August
Bronze	Asilbek Sodikov	Kickboxing	Men's K1 style 63.5 kg	14 August
Bronze	Khusankhon Baratov	Kickboxing	Men's K1 style 91 kg	14 August
Bronze	Uzbekistan men's national sambo team: Sokhibjon Khasanboev; Ozodbek Murotov; Sharif Kushaev	Sambo	Men's team	14 August

Medals by sport
Sport	1st place, gold medalist(s)	2nd place, silver medalist(s)	3rd place, bronze medalist(s)	Total
Sambo	3	2	3	8
Wushu	0	1	0	1
Kickboxing	0	0	2	2
Total	3	3	5	11

== Competitors ==
The following is the list of number of competitors in the Games.

Sport	Men	Women	Total
Kickboxing	4	3	7
Muaythai	1	0	1
Sambo	3	5	8
Wushu	1	2	3
Total	9	10	19
