= Azerbaijan at the 2025 World Games =

- IOC code: AZE
- NOC: National Olympic Committee of the Republic of Azerbaijan

in Chengdu, China 7 August 2025 – 17 August 2025
- Competitors: 8 (7 men and 1 woman) in 4 sports and 8 events
- Medals Ranked 56th: Gold 0 Silver 5 Bronze 0 Total 5

World Games appearances
- 1981; 1985; 1989; 1993; 1997; 2001; 2005; 2009; 2013; 2017; 2022; 2025

Azerbaijan competed at the 2025 World Games held in Chengdu, China from 7 to 17 August 2025.

Athletes representing Azerbaijan won five silver medals and the country finished in 56th place in the medal table.

== Medalists ==
Medal	Name	Sport	Event	Date
Silver	Irina Zaretska	Karate	Women's kumite 68 kg	9 August
Silver	Daniel Abbasov; Murad Rafiyev	Acrobatic gymnastics	Men's pairs	9 August
Silver	Tofig Aliyev	Trampoline gymnastics	Men's tumbling	10 August
Silver	Amin Guliyev	Kickboxing	Men's K1 style 63.5 kg	14 August
Silver	Madina Mustafayeva; Vladimir Dolmatov	Aerobic gymnastics	Pairs	15 August

== Competitors ==
The following is the list of number of competitors in the Games.

Sport	Men	Women	Total
Gymnastics	6	0	6
Karate	0	1	1
Kickboxing	1	0	1
Wushu	1	0	1
Total	8	1	9
