= Bulgaria at the 2025 World Games =

- IOC code: BUL
- NOC: Bulgarian Olympic Committee

in Chengdu, China 7 August 2025 – 17 August 2025
- Competitors: 14 (10 men and 4 women) in 5 sports and 10 events
- Medals Ranked 60th: Gold 0 Silver 2 Bronze 2 Total 4

World Games appearances
- 1981; 1985; 1989; 1993; 1997; 2001; 2005; 2009; 2013; 2017; 2022; 2025

Bulgaria competed at the 2025 World Games held in Chengdu, China from 7 to 17 August 2025.

Athletes representing Bulgaria won two silver medals and two bronze medals. The country finished in 60th place in the medal table.

== Medalists ==
Medal	Name	Sport	Event	Date
Silver	Dimitar Stoyanov	Kickboxing	Men's K1 style 75 kg	14 August
Silver	Aleksandra Georgieva	Kickboxing	Women's point fighting 60 kg	14 August
Bronze	Borislav Radulov	Kickboxing	Men's point fighting 63 kg	14 August
Bronze	Hristo Manolov; Antonio Papazov; Borislava Ivanova	Aerobic gymnastics	Trios	16 August

== Competitors ==
The following is the list of number of competitors in the Games.

Sport	Men	Women	Total
Air sports	2	0	2
Gymnastics	5	2	7
Karate	0	1	1
Kickboxing	2	1	3
Powerlifting	1	0	1
Total	10	4	14

== Gymnastics ==
=== Parkour ===
Women

Athlete	Event	Qualification		Final	
Athlete	Event	Result	Rank	Result	Rank
Kseniya Momchilova	Women's speed	43.07	4 Q	41.45	5
