= Portugal at the 2025 World Games =

- IOC code: POR
- NOC: Olympic Committee of Portugal

in Chengdu, China 7 August 2025 – 17 August 2025
- Competitors: 57 (29 men and 28 women) in 11 sports and 33 events
- Medals Ranked 27th: Gold 3 Silver 3 Bronze 4 Total 10

World Games appearances
- 1981; 1985; 1989; 1993; 1997; 2001; 2005; 2009; 2013; 2017; 2022; 2025

Portugal competed at the 2025 World Games held in Chengdu, China from 7 to 17 August 2025. Athletes representing Portugal won three gold medals, three silver medals and four bronze medals. The country finished in 27th place in the medal table.

== Medalists ==
Medal	Name	Sport	Event	Date
Gold	Gabriel Albuquerque; Lucas Santos	Trampoline gymnastics	Men's synchronized	8 August
Gold	Diana Gago	Trampoline gymnastics	Women's double mini	10 August
Gold	Catarina Dias	Kickboxing	Women's K1 style 70kg	14 August
Silver	Lara Fernandes; Guilherme Henriques	Acrobatic gymnastics	Mixed pairs	8 August
Silver	Pedro Ramalho	Ju-jitsu	Men's Ne-Waza 85kg	11 August
Silver	Rodrigo Gomes; Rui Rodrigues; Simao Santos; Tiago Costa; Francisco Santos; Jose Silva; Jose Rebelo; Miguel Ribeiro; Diogo Ferreira; Ricardo Castro	Beach handball	Men's tournament	12 August
Bronze	Beatriz Carneiro; Inês Faria	Acrobatic gymnastics	Women's pairs	8 August
Bronze	Miguel Lopes; Gonçalo Parreiria	Acrobatic gymnastics	Men's pairs	9 August
Bronze	José Ramalho	Canoe marathon	Men's K1 short distance	9 August
Bronze	José Ramalho	Canoe marathon	Men's K1 long distance	10 August

== Competitors ==
The following is the list of number of competitors in the Games.

Sport	Men	Women	Total
Canoe marathon	2	2	4
Dancesport	0	1	1
Gymnastics	5	3	8
Handball	10	10	20
Ju-jitsu	2	0	2
Kickboxing	1	2	3
Korfball	7	7	14
Orienteering	0	2	2
Road speed skating Track speed skating	2	0	2
Triathlon	1	0	1
Wushu	0	1	1
Total	29	28	57

== Beach handball ==
Team	Event	Preliminary round				Quarterfinal	Semifinal	Final / BM / PM	
Team	Event	Opposition Result	Opposition Result	Opposition Result	Rank	Opposition Result	Opposition Result	Opposition Result	Rank
Portugal men's	Men's tournament	Brazil; L 1–2	Germany; W 1–2	Croatia; W 0–2	2	Tunisia; W 2–1	Spain; W 1–2	Germany; L 1–2	2nd place, silver medalist(s)
Portugal women's	Women's tournament	Argentina; L 2–0	China; W 2–0	Croatia; L 0–2	3	Spain; L 0–2	Consolation semifinal Vietnam; W 1–2	5th place game China; W 2–0	5
