= Morocco at the 2025 World Games =

- IOC code: MAR
- NOC: Moroccan National Olympic Committee

in Chengdu, China 7 August 2025 – 17 August 2025
- Competitors: 11 (8 men and 3 women) in 5 sports and 12 events
- Medals Ranked 49th: Gold 1 Silver 0 Bronze 1 Total 2

World Games appearances
- 1981; 1985; 1989; 1993; 1997; 2001; 2005; 2009; 2013; 2017; 2022; 2025

Morocco competed at the 2025 World Games held in Chengdu, China from 7 to 17 August 2025.

Athletes representing Morocco won one gold medal and one bronze medal. The country finished in 49th place in the medal table.

== Medalists ==
Medal	Name	Sport	Event	Date
Gold	Said Oubaya	Karate	Men's kumite 67 kg	8 August
Bronze	Oumaima Belouarrat	Muaythai	Women's 48 kg	10 August

== Competitors ==
The following is the list of number of competitors in the Games.

Sport	Men	Women	Total
Karate	2	0	2
Kickboxing	1	1	2
Muaythai	1	1	2
Sambo	3	1	4
Triathlon	1	0	1
Total	8	3	11
