= Hungary at the 2025 World Games =

- IOC code: HUN
- NOC: Hungarian Olympic Committee

in Chengdu, China 7 August 2025 – 17 August 2025
- Competitors: 90 (47 men and 43 women) in 18 sports and 61 events
- Medals Ranked 7th: Gold 11 Silver 8 Bronze 5 Total 24

World Games appearances
- 1981; 1985; 1989; 1993; 1997; 2001; 2005; 2009; 2013; 2017; 2022; 2025

Hungary competed at the 2025 World Games held in Chengdu, China from 7 to 17 August 2025. Athletes representing Hungary won 11 gold medals, 8 silver medals and 5 bronze medals. The country finished in 7th place in the medal table.

== Competitors ==
The following is the list of number of competitors in the Games.

Sport	Men	Women	Total
Air sports	1	0	1
Archery	1	0	1
Billards	1	0	1
Canoe dragon boat	11	11	22
Canoe marathon	2	2	4
Dancesport	1	1	2
Gymnastics	1	0	1
Ju-jitsu	0	3	3
Karate	1	0	1
Kickboxing	3	3	6
Korfball	3	3	6
Lifesaving	4	0	4
Muaythai	0	1	1
Orienteering	4	4	8
Powerlifting	2	0	2
Speed skating	0	1	1
Squash	1	1	2
Underwater sports	5	6	11
Wakeboarding	1	0	1
Total	47	43	90

== Medalists ==
Medal	Name	Sport	Event	Date
Gold	Petra Senanszky	Finswimming	Women's 50 metre bi-fins	10 August
Gold	Nándor Kiss	Finswimming	Men's 400 metre surface	10 August
Gold	Zsófia Törőcsik	Freediving	Women's dynamic with fins	11 August
Gold	Szebasztián Szabó	Finswimming	Men's 50 metre bi-fins	11 August
Gold	Nándor Kiss	Finswimming	Men's 200 metre surface	11 August
Gold	Petra Senanszky	Finswimming	Women's 100 metre bi-fins	11 August
Gold	Tamara Toros	Ju-jitsu	Women's open Ne-Waza	12 August
Gold	Olivér Szolnoki	Billiard sports	Men's pool	14 August
Gold	Roland Veres	Kickboxing	Men's point fighting 63 kg	14 August
Gold	Andrea Busa	Kickboxing	Women's point fighting 70 kg	14 August
Gold	Antónia Kőnig; Zoltán Lőcsei; Fruzsina Fejér; Anna Makranszki; Vanessza Rusicska; Tünde Himmel; Kamilla Goda; András Mikulecz	Aerobic gymnastics	Aerobic dance	16 August
Silver	Vanda Kiszli	Canoe marathon	Women's K1 short distance	9 August
Silver	Zsófia Törőcsik	Freediving	Women's dynamic no fins	10 August
Silver	Lilla Blaszák	Finswimming	Women's 200 metre surface	10 August
Silver	Vanda Kiszli	Canoe marathon	Women's K1 long distance	10 August
Silver	Szebasztián Szabó	Finswimming	Men's 100 metre bi-fins	10 August
Silver	Dorottya Pernyész	Finswimming	Women's 100 metre bi-fins	11 August
Silver	Balázs Farkas	Squash	Men's singles	12 August
Silver	Enahoro Asein	Powerlifting	Men's classic middleweight	14 August
Bronze	Zoltan Bujdoso	Orienteering	Men's sprint	10 August
Bronze	Alexa Tóth	Ju-jitsu	Women's 57 kg Ne-Waza	10 August
Bronze	Alex Mozsár	Finswimming	Men's 400 metre surface	10 August
Bronze	Attila Norbert Spéth	Muaythai	Men's 71 kg	10 August
Bronze	Alexa Tóth	Ju-jitsu	Women's open Ne-Waza	12 August

Medals by sport
Sport	1st place, gold medalist(s)	2nd place, silver medalist(s)	3rd place, bronze medalist(s)	Total
Finswimming	5	3	1	9
Kickboxing	2	0	0	2
Freediving	1	1	0	2
Ju-jitsu	1	0	2	3
Aerobic gymnastics	1	0	0	1
Billiard sports	1	0	0	1
Canoe marathon	0	2	0	2
Powerlifting	0	1	0	1
Squash	0	1	0	1
Muaythai	0	0	1	1
Orieentering	0	0	1	1
Total	11	8	5	24

== Korfball ==
Beach

Hungary qualified in beach korfball at the 2024 World Beach Korfball Championship.

Athlete	Event	Group stage				Quarterfinal	Semi-final	Final / BM	
Athlete	Event	Opposition Score	Opposition Score	Opposition Score	Rank	Opposition Score	Opposition Score	Opposition Score	Rank
Team Hungary	Beach Korfball	China; W 5-9	United States; D 5-5	Chinese Taipei; L 7-4	2	Poland; W 8–7	Netherlands; L 12-4	Belgium; L 5-10	4

== Powerlifting ==
Classic

Athlete	Event	Exercises			Total weight	Total points	Rank
Athlete	Event	Squat	Bench press	Deadlift	Total weight	Total points	Rank
Enahoro Asein	Men's Middleweight	285.0	155.0	377.5	817.5	113.38	2nd place, silver medalist(s)
Kristof Budai	Men's Super Heavyweight	332.5	220.0	350.0	902.5	105.57	7

== Squash ==
Athlete	Event	Round of 32	Round of 16 / CR	Quarterfinals / CQ	Semi-finals / CS	Final / BM / CF	
Athlete	Event	Opposition Score	Opposition Score	Opposition Score	Opposition Score	Opposition Score	Rank
Balázs Farkas	Men's singles	Li (CHN); W 0–3	E. Franco (GUA); W 0–3	Byrtus (CZE); W 0–3	Steinmann (SUI); W 3–0	Crouin (FRA); L 3–0	2nd place, silver medalist(s)
Hannah Chukwu	Women's singles	Peychar (AUT); W 3–0	Watanabe (JPN); L 3–1	Classification round Allinckx (SUI); W 3–2	Classification round Tycova (GER); W 3–2	Classification final Vidovic (CRO); W 3–0	9
