= Egypt at the 2025 World Games =

- IOC code: EGY
- NOC: Egyptian Olympic Committee

in Chengdu, China 7 August 2025 – 17 August 2025
- Competitors: 26 (13 men and 13 women) in 8 sports and 25 events
- Medals Ranked 44th: Gold 1 Silver 1 Bronze 4 Total 6

World Games appearances
- 1981; 1985; 1989; 1993; 1997; 2001; 2005; 2009; 2013; 2017; 2022; 2025

Egypt competed at the 2025 World Games held in Chengdu, China from 7 to 17 August 2025.

Athletes representing Egypt won one gold medal, one silver medal and four bronze medals. The country finished in 44th place in the medal table.

== Medalists ==
Medal	Name	Sport	Event	Date
Gold	Alhussein Wahdan	Wushu	Men's 85 kg	12 August
Silver	Sameh Sidhom	Billiard sports	Men's carom three cushion	14 August
Bronze	Noursin Aly	Karate	Women's kumite 61 kg	9 August
Bronze	Abdalla Abdelaziz	Karate	Men's kumite 75 kg	9 August
Bronze	Tarek Hassan Elsayed	Finswimming	Men's 100 metre surface	10 August
Bronze	Menaalla Aly	Wushu	Women's 70 kg	12 August

== Competitors ==
The following is the list of number of competitors in the Games.

Sport	Men	Women	Total
Billards	2	0	2
Karate	4	3	7
Kickboxing	1	1	2
Sambo	1	3	4
Squash	1	1	2
Triathlon	2	3	5
Underwater sports	1	1	2
Wushu	1	1	2
Total	13	13	26

== Squash ==
Athlete	Event	Round of 32	Round of 16 / CR	Quarterfinals / CQ	Semi-finals / CS	Final / BM / CF	
Athlete	Event	Opposition Score	Opposition Score	Opposition Score	Opposition Score	Opposition Score	Rank
Mohamed Nasser	Men's singles	Zhou (CHN); W 0–3	Lau (HKG); L 3–0	Classification round Zaman (PAK); WO	Did not advance		=13
Habiba Hani	Women's singles	Xu (CHN); W 0–3	Allinckx (SUI); W 1–3	Watanabe (JPN); L 3–0	Did not advance		=5
