= Kazakhstan at the 2025 World Games =

- IOC code: KAZ
- NOC: National Olympic Committee of the Republic of Kazakhstan

in Chengdu, China 7 August 2025 – 17 August 2025
- Competitors: 33 (22 men and 11 women) in 9 sports and 36 events
- Medals Ranked 31st: Gold 2 Silver 5 Bronze 3 Total 10

World Games appearances
- 1981; 1985; 1989; 1993; 1997; 2001; 2005; 2009; 2013; 2017; 2022; 2025

Kazakhstan competed at the 2025 World Games held in Chengdu, China from 7 to 17 August 2025.

Athletes representing Kazakhstan won two gold medals, five silver medal and three bronze medals. The country finished in 31st place in the medal table.

== Medalists ==
Medal	Name	Sport	Event	Date
Gold	Abu-Bakir Zhanibek	Ju-jitsu	Men's 69 kg fighting	10 August
Gold	Ulbossyn Adilova	Sambo	Women's 80 kg	14 August
Silver	Moldir Zhangbyrbay	Karate	Women's kumite 50 kg	8 August
Silver	Nursultan Duisenkulov	Ju-jitsu	Men's 77 kg fighting	10 August
Silver	Maratbek Rakhmetollin	Sambo	Men's 64 kg	14 August
Silver	Kazakhstan women's national sambo team: Aruzhan Kenessary; Ulbossyn Adilova; Kuralay Kabraikyzy; Marzhan Bizak; Ainur Akzhigitova	Sambo	Women's team	14 August
Silver	Kazakhstan men's national sambo team: Niyetkhan Toleukhan; Bakytzhan Duisembekov; Maratbek Rakhmetollin; Tanirbergen Tergeubekov	Sambo	Men's team	14 August
Bronze	Aslan Kanatbek	Ju-jitsu	Men's 62 kg fighting	10 August
Bronze	Seiilkhan Bolatbek	Ju-jitsu	Men's 77 kg ne-waza	11 August
Bronze	Rishat Khaibullin	Sport climbing	Men's Speed Single 4	15 August

== Competitors ==
The following is the list of number of competitors in the Games.

Sport	Men	Women	Total
Archery	0	1	1
Gymnastics	2	0	2
Ju-jitsu	5	0	5
Karate	3	3	6
Muaythai	1	0	1
Orienteering	2	2	4
Sambo	4	5	9
Sport climbing	4	0	4
Wushu	1	0	1
Total	22	11	33
