= Chengdu Sport University =

Sports university in Chengdu, China

Chengdu Kinesiology University
- 成都体育学院
- Type: National
- Established: 1942
- Location: Chengdu, Sichuan, China
- Website: www.cdsu.edu.cn

Chengdu Sport University
- Simplified Chinese: 成都体育学院
- Traditional Chinese: 成都體育學院
Transcriptions
Standard Mandarin
- Hanyu Pinyin: Chéngdū Tǐyù Xuéyuàn

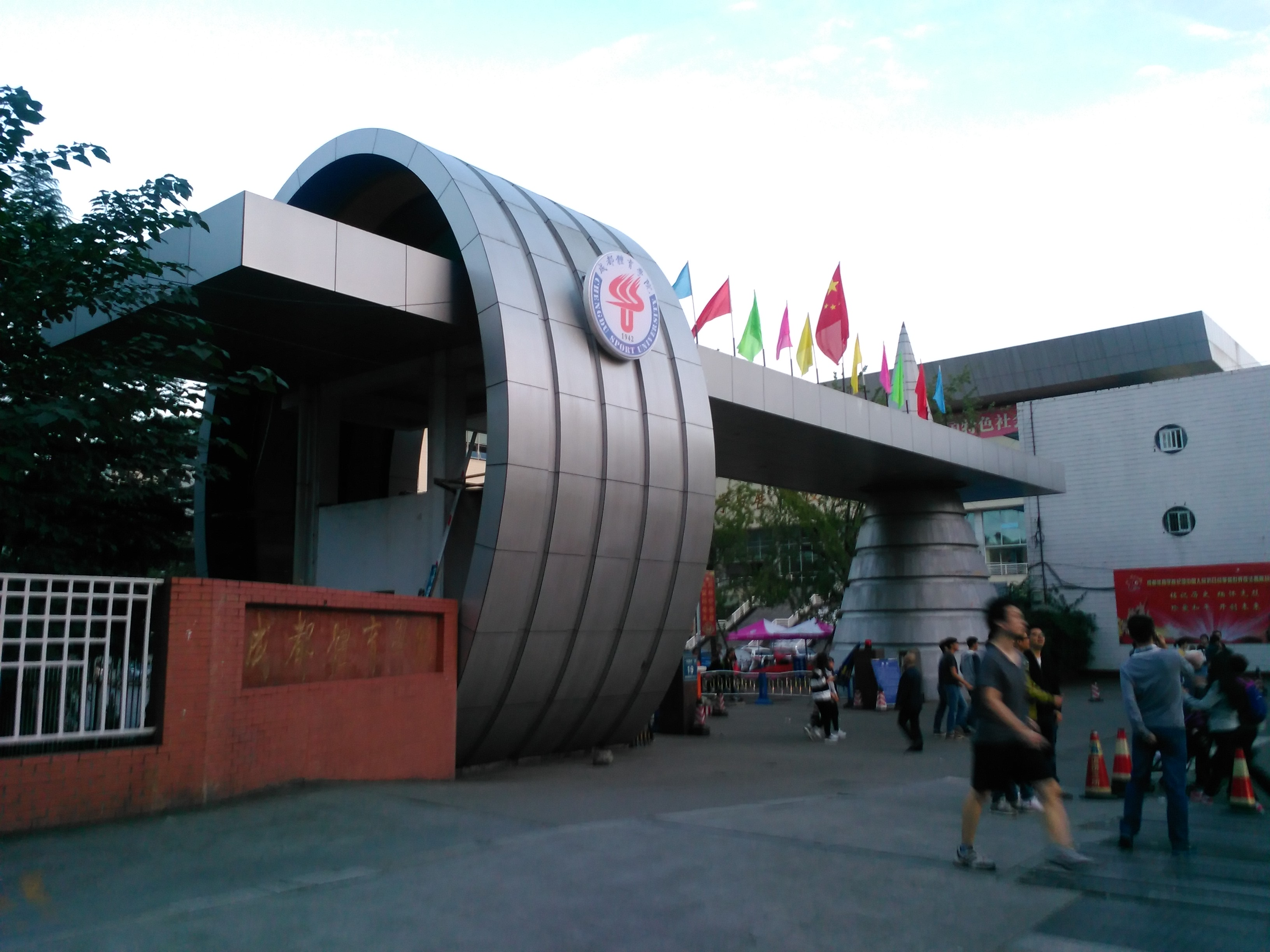
Main gate

Chengdu Sport University (Chinese: 成都体育学院; pinyin: Chéngdū Tǐyù Xuéyuàn) is a sports university in the southwest of the downtown district of Chengdu, Sichuan Province.

The university is administered by the national State General Administration of Sports and the Sichuan provincial government.

The Hang Kong Gang Campus is about 1 kilometre (0.62 mi) from Chengdu Shuangliu International Airport.

Chengdu Sport University was founded in 1942. In 1953, the fully-established system was transformed into the Southwest Institute of Sports. In 1956, it was changed to Chengdu Sports University.

It is the most famous kinesiology university in southwest China, as well as one of the top five of the kind. It has a reputation from sports, such as gymnastics, martial art and weightlifting, and is recognized as an established authority in sports medicine and the application of T.C.M. in prevention, therapy and recovery of sports injuries and fatigue.

== History ==
The university was formerly the Chengdu Institute of Physical Education in English. The Chinese name was and is 成都体育学院. It has a history of more than 60 years. The university is adjacent to Wuhou Shrine.

In 2002, it was the first college in China to establish a Sports-Oriented English Department, aiming to support the Beijing Olympic Games in 2008 by providing translators and interpreters. For its contributions to the national sports undertakings, it was ranked as one of top three sports universities in China in 2006.

== Alumni ==
- James Li, athletics coach at the University of Arizona
