= Qualification for the 2025 World Games =

The 2025 World Games took place in Chengdu, China from 7 to 17 August 2025. The qualification procedure for each sport, and those countries that qualified are as follows:

== Air Sports ==
There will be one air sport event at the games. Qualification will be based on a ranking list compiled by the FAI, dependent on results from the 2024 World Drone Racing Championships, and the 2024 Drone Racing World Cup. Countries may have no more than one athlete per gender competing.

Event	Location	Dates	Total places	Qualified NOCs
Mixed– 32 athletes
Host nation	—	—	2	China; China
FAI Ranking List	—	2025	30	Austria; Belgium; Bulgaria; Bulgaria; China; China; Czech Republic; France; France; Germany; Germany; Hong Kong; Hungary; Italy; Japan; Japan (Note: In qualifications list on IWGA website Japan has got two quota places, despite in official information from FAI that country is listed with only one quota.); Latvia; Latvia; Liechtenstein (Note: Marvin Schapper, who won the quota place is scheduled to compete for Liechtenstein as it stands in qualifications list on IWGA website. In information about qualifications from FAI website he is listed as Swiss athlete.); Poland; Romania; Serbia; South Korea; South Korea; South Korea; Spain; Thailand; Turkey; United States; United States (Note: In qualifications list on IWGA website United States has got two quota places, despite in official information from FAI that country is listed with only one quota.)

== Archery ==
Qualification is as follows:

=== Men's events ===
Event	Location	Dates	Total places	Qualified NOCs
Compound – 26 male archers
Host nation	—	—	2	China
2024 Pan American Archery Championships	(Colombia) Medellín	9–14 April 2024	3	Mexico; Guatemala; Colombia
2024 European Archery Championships	(Germany) Essen	7–12 May 2024	3	Denmark; Israel; Netherlands
2024 Summer Paralympics	(France) Paris	29–31 August 2024	1	India (Note: Quota was originally won by American archer Matt Stutzman, but he ended his career in December of 2024. Automatically quota place was awarded to the next best placed athlete at the 2024 Summer Paralympics - Indian archer Rakesh Kumar, who placed fourth in individual compound event. Two Chinese athletes finished in second and third position, but their quota was allocated earlier.)
2025 Asian Cup - First stage	(Thailand) Bangkok	16–22 February 2025	3	India; South Korea; Malaysia
2025 Oceania Continental Qualification Tournament	(New Zealand) Auckland	15–16 March 2025	2	Australia; New Zealand
2025 African Archery Championships	TBD	TBD	2	South Africa; South Africa
World ranking	—	7 April 2025	10	Austria; France; India; Italy; Puerto Rico; Slovakia; Turkey; Turkey; United States; United States
Recurve – 12 male archers
Host nation	—	—	1	China
2024 World Field Archery Championships	(Canada) Lac La Biche	16–22 September 2024	11	Australia; Belgium; Croatia; France; Great Britain; Germany; Italy; Netherlands; Slovenia; United States; United States
Barebow – 12 male archers
Host nation	—	—	1	China
2024 World Field Archery Championships	(Canada) Lac La Biche	16–22 September 2024	10	Canada; France; Great Britain; Germany; Hungary; Italy; Spain; Spain; Sweden; United States

=== Women's events ===
Event	Location	Dates	Total places	Qualified NOCs
Compound– 26 female archers
Host nation	—	—	2	China
2024 Pan American Archery Championships	(Colombia) Medellín	9–14 April 2024	3	United States; Mexico; Colombia
2024 European Archery Championships	(Germany) Essen	7–12 May 2024	3	Great Britain; Italy; Turkey
2024 Summer Paralympics	(France) Paris	29–31 August 2024	1	Turkey
2025 Asian Cup - First stage	(Thailand) Bangkok	16–22 February 2025	3	South Korea; Kazakhstan; Iran
2025 Oceania Continental Qualification Tournament	(New Zealand) Auckland	15–16 March 2025	2	Australia; Australia
2025 African Archery Championships	TBD	TBD	2	Namibia; South Africa
World ranking	—	7 April 2025	10	Colombia; Croatia; Denmark; Estonia; Estonia; India; India; Luxembourg; Mexico; United States
Recurve – 12 female archers
Host nation	—	—	1	China
2024 World Field Archery Championships	(Canada) Lac La Biche	16–22 September 2024	11	Australia; Canada; France; Great Britain; Germany; Italy; Italy; Netherlands; Slovakia; Slovenia; United States
Barebow – 12 female archers
Host nation	—	—	1	China
2024 World Field Archery Championships	(Canada) Lac La Biche	16–22 September 2024	11	Argentina; Australia; Austria; France; Germany; Italy; Romania; Spain; Sweden; United States; United States

== Beach handball ==
Qualification was as follows:

Event	Location	Dates	Total places	Qualified NOCs
Men's – 8 teams
Host nation	—	—	1	China
2024 Men's Beach Handball World Championships	(China) Pingtan	18–23 June 2024	7	Croatia; Denmark; Portugal; Germany; Brazil; Qatar; Tunisia
Women's – 8 teams
Host nation	—	—	1	China
2024 Women's Beach Handball World Championships	(China) Pingtan	18–23 June 2024	7	Germany; Argentina; Netherlands; Denmark; Vietnam; Spain; Portugal

== Billiard sports ==
Qualification is as follows:

=== Carom ===
Event	Location	Dates	Total places	Qualified NOCs
Men's – 3 Cushion
Host nation	—	—	1	China
			11	Colombia; Costa Rica; Egypt; Germany; South Korea; South Korea; Netherlands; Sweden; Turkey; United States; Vietnam
Women's – 3 Cushion
Host nation	—	—	1	—
			8	Colombia; Denmark; Japan; Netherlands; Netherlands; Peru; Turkey; Vietnam

=== Pool ===
Event	Location	Dates	Total places	Qualified NOCs
Men's – 10-Ball
Host nation	—	—	1	China
			11	China; Estonia; Germany; Hungary; Peru; Philippines; Poland; Samoa; Chinese Taipei; Chinese Taipei; United States
Women's – 10-Ball
Host nation	—	—	1	China
			11	Individual Neutral Athletes; Argentina; Australia; Canada; China; Spain; Germany; Germany; Philippines; Philippines; United States
Heyball
Host nation	—	—	1	China
			15	Australia; Chile; China; China; China; Costa Rica; India; Netherlands; South Africa; South Africa; Singapore; Sweden; Thailand; United States; United States

=== Snooker ===
Event	Location	Dates	Total places	Qualified NOCs
Men's – 15-Reds
Host nation	—	—	1	China
			11	China; Cyprus; Egypt; Great Britain; Germany; India; India; Iran; Pakistan; Poland; United Arab Emirates
Women's – 6-Reds
Host nation	—	—	1	China
			7	Belgium; Hong Kong; Hong Kong; India; Mongolia; Thailand; Thailand

== Boules sports ==
Qualification is as follows:

=== Lyonnaise ===
Event	Location	Dates	Total places	Qualified NOCs
Progressive Shooting – Single Men
Host nation	—	—	1	China
			7	Argentina; Australia; Croatia; France; Italy; Slovenia; Turkey
Progressive Shooting – Single Women
Host nation	—	—	1	China
			7	Argentina; Australia; Croatia; France; Italy; Slovenia; Turkey
Quick Shooting
Host nation	—	—	1	China
			7	Argentina; Australia; Croatia; France; Italy; Slovenia; Turkey

=== Petanque ===
Event	Location	Dates	Total places	Qualified NOCs
Classic – Doubles
Host nation	—	—	1	China
			7	Benin; Spain; France; Italy; Thailand; Tunisia; Vietnam
Progressive Shooting – Single Men
Host nation	—	—	1	China
			8	Benin; Spain; France; Italy; Madagascar; Thailand; Tunisia; Vietnam
Progressive Shooting – Single Women
Host nation	—	—	1	China
			8	Benin; Spain; France; Italy; Madagascar; Thailand; Tunisia; Vietnam

== Canoe sports ==
=== Canoe marathon ===
In men's and women's canoe marathon, along with the host nation, the top performing nation of each continent at the 2024 ICF Canoe Marathon World Championships will qualify an athlete, followed by the 14 next best performing.

Event	Location	Dates	Total places	Qualified NOCs
Men's – 20 male canoeists (17 in long distance + 3 extra in short distance)
Host nation	—	—	1	China
2024 ICF Canoe Marathon World Championships	(Croatia) Metković	19–22 September 2024	19	Argentina; Australia; Belgium; Czech Republic; Denmark; France; Germany; Great Britain; Hungary; Ireland; Italy; Japan; Netherlands; Norway; New Zealand; Poland; Portugal; South Africa; Spain
Women's – 20 female canoeists (17 in long distance + 3 extra in short distance)
Host nation	—	—	1	China
2024 ICF Canoe Marathon World Championships	(Croatia) Metković	19–22 September 2024	19	Argentina; Australia; Czech Republic; Denmark; Estonia; France; Germany; Great Britain; Hungary; Italy; Japan; Netherlands; New Zealand; Portugal; Serbia; Slovakia; South Africa; Spain; Sweden

=== Canoe polo ===
As well as the host nation, the six top ranked men's and women's teams at the 2024 ICF Canoe Polo World Championships will qualify, along with the highest ranked team from a non-qualifying continent.

Event	Location	Dates	Total places	Qualified NOCs
Men's – 8 teams
Host nation	—	—	1	China
2024 ICF Canoe Polo World Championships	(China) Deqing	15–20 October 2024	7	Denmark; France; Germany; Great Britain; Italy; Poland; Spain
Women's – 8 teams
Host nation	—	—	1	China
2024 ICF Canoe Polo World Championships	(China) Deqing	15–20 October 2024	7	Denmark; Germany; Iran; Italy; Netherlands; New Zealand; Spain

=== Dragon boat ===
Qualification is as follows:

Event	Location	Dates	Total places	Qualified NOCs
Mixed– 12 teams
Host nation	—	—	1	China
2024 ICF Dragon Boat World Cup	(China) Yichang	24–27 October 2024	2	Indonesia; Thailand
2024 ICF Dragon Boat World Championships	(Philippines) Puerto Princesa	30 October–3 November 2024	9	Cambodia; Chinese Taipei; Czech Republic; Hungary; Myanmar; Philippines; South Korea; Spain; Ukraine

== Cheerleading ==
Qualification is as follows:

Event	Location	Dates	Total places	Qualified NOCs
Mixed pom doubles– 11 teams
Host nation	—	—	2	China
2024 ICU European Cheerleading Championships	(Norway) Oslofjord	28–30 June 2024	1	Ukraine
2024 ICU Asian Cheerleading Championships	(Indonesia) Bali	13–15 September 2024	1	Japan
2024 ICU Pan American Cheerleading Championships	(Canada) Ottawa	27–30 September 2024	1	Mexico
2024 The World Games Series	Hong Kong	11–13 October 2024	1	United States
Worldwide global video submission	—	From 1 April 2025	2	Croatia; Finland
2024 ICU World Cheerleading Championships	(United States) Orlando	23–25 April 2025	3	Ecuador; Australia; Great Britain

== Dancesport ==
Qualification is as follows:

Event	Location	Dates	Total places	Qualified NOCs
Breaking – Individual Men
Host nation	—	—	3	China
			13	Australia; Belgium; Brazil; Brazil; Chile; Spain; Japan; Japan; Japan; South Korea; Poland; Chinese Taipei; Ukraine
Breaking – Individual Women
Host nation	—	—	3	China
			13	Brazil; France; Italy; Italy; Japan; Japan; Japan; South Korea; Lithuania; Netherlands; Portugal; Ukraine; Ukraine
Latin – Couple
Host nation	—	—	3	China
			21	Czech Republic; Czech Republic; Denmark; Spain; Estonia; France; Germany; Germany; Germany; Hong Kong; Hungary; Israel; Israel; Italy; Italy; Italy; Latvia; Poland; Romania; Romania; United States
Standard – Couple
Host nation	—	—	4	China
			20	Individual Neutral Athletes; Estonia; Germany; Hong Kong; Israel; Israel; Italy; Italy; Latvia; Latvia; Lithuania; Moldova; Poland; Poland; Romania; Romania; Slovakia; Ukraine; Ukraine; United States

== Duathlon ==
Qualification is as follows:

Event	Location	Dates	Total places	Qualified NOCs
Men's – 40 duathletes
Host nation	—	—	2	China
2024 Africa Triathlon Sprint Duathlon Championships	(Egypt) Hurghada	20 April 2024	4	Morocco; Bahrain; Kosovo; Saudi Arabia
2024 Europe Triathlon Duathlon Championships	(Portugal) Coimbra	15–16 June 2024	4	Belgium; Spain; France; France
2024 Americas Triathlon Sprint Duathlon Championships (Note: The Americas qualification event was originally the 2024 Americas Triathlon Duathlon Championships in Santo Domingo, Dominican Republic, scheduled to take place from 9 to 10 November 2024, but the event was cancelled.)	(Colombia) Cali	23 June 2024	4	Mexico; Mexico; Colombia; Colombia
2024 World Triathlon Duathlon Championships	(Australia) Townsville	16 August 2024	10	Spain; France; Belgium; Belgium; Spain; Australia; Australia; Japan; Japan; Japan
2025 Asia Triathlon Duathlon Championships	(Bahrain) Manama	22 February 2025	4	Philippines; Iran; Iran; Iran
World Triathlon Rankings	—	—	9	Slovakia; Germany; Netherlands; Netherlands; Panama; Algeria; Portugal; Algeria; Mongolia
Invitational places	—	—	3	Cambodia; Egypt; Egypt
Women's – 36 duathletes
Host nation	—	—	1	China
2024 Africa Triathlon Sprint Duathlon Championships	(Egypt) Hurghada	20 April 2024	3	Singapore; Singapore; Singapore
2024 Europe Triathlon Duathlon Championships	(Portugal) Coimbra	15–16 June 2024	3	France; Belgium; Spain
2024 Americas Triathlon Sprint Duathlon Championships	(Colombia) Cali	23 June 2024	4	Mexico; Mexico; Colombia; Colombia
2024 World Triathlon Duathlon Championships	(Australia) Townsville	16 August 2024	6	Belgium; Japan; Japan; Germany; Japan; Germany
2025 Asia Triathlon Duathlon Championships	(Bahrain) Manama	22 February 2025	4	Philippines; Philippines; Iran; Philippines
World Triathlon Rankings	—	—	12	Germany; Iran; Iran; Slovakia; Netherlands; Egypt; Portugal; Egypt; Venezuela; Czech Republic; Venezuela; Czech Republic
Invitational places	—	—	3	Egypt; Kenya; Kenya

== Fistball ==
Qualification is as follows:

Event	Location	Dates	Total places	Qualified NOCs
Men's – 8 teams
Host nation	—	—	1	—
2023 Men's Fistball World Championships	(Germany) Mannheim	22–29 July 2023	4	Germany; Austria; Brazil; Switzerland
2024 European Men's Fistball Championships	(Switzerland) Frauenfeld	21–24 August 2024	1	Italy
Continental Championships x2	TBD	TBD	3	Argentina; Australia; Chile
Women's – 8 teams
Host nation	—	—	1	—
2024 European Women's Fistball Championships	(Austria) Grieskirchen	18–19 August 2023	1	Germany
2024 Women's Fistball World Championships	(Argentina) Montecarlo	7–10 November 2024	4	Brazil; Switzerland; Austria; Chile
Continental Championships x2	TBD	TBD	3	Argentina; New Zealand; United States

== Flag football ==
Qualification was as follows:

Event	Location	Dates	Total places	Qualified NOCs
Women's – 8 teams
Host nation	—	—	1	China
2024 IFAF Women's Flag Football World Championship	(Finland) Lahti	27–30 August 2024	7	United States; Mexico; Japan; Austria; ~~Spain~~; Canada; Great Britain; Italy

== Floorball ==
Qualification is as follows:

Event	Location	Dates	Total places	Qualified NOCs
Men's – 8 teams
Host nation	—	—	1	China
TWG25 American Qualification event	(Canada) Toronto	17–18 February 2024	1	Canada
2024 Men's World Floorball Championships	(Sweden) Malmö	7–15 December 2024	6 (Note: Five best performing teams qualified, plus the highest performing team from Oceania)	Sweden; Finland; Czech Republic; Latvia; Switzerland; Philippines
Women's – 8 teams
2023 Women's World Floorball Championships	Singapore	2–10 December 2023	5	Sweden; Finland; Czech Republic; Switzerland; Slovakia
TWG25 American Qualification event	(Canada) Fredericton	2–4 August 2024	1	Canada
TWG25 AOFC Qualification event	Singapore	18–22 March 2025	2	Singapore; Thailand

== Flying disc ==
Qualification is as follows:

Event	Location	Dates	Total places	Qualified NOCs
Disc golf – 16 teams
Host nation	—	—	1	China
WFDF World Rankings	—	—	15	Australia; Austria; Canada; Czech Republic; Estonia; Finland; France; Germany; Great Britain; Japan; Latvia; Lithuania (Note: Lithuania replaced New Zealand (refused participation)); Norway; Slovakia; United States
Ultimate – teams
Host nation	—	—	1	China
WFDF World Rankings	—	—	7	Australia; Canada; Colombia; France; Germany; Japan; United States

== Gymnastics ==
=== Acrobatic gymnastics ===
Qualification was as follows:

Event	Location	Dates	Total places	Qualified NOCs
Men's pairs – 6 male pairs
2024 Acrobatic Gymnastics World Championships	(Portugal) Guimarães	19–22 September 2024	5	Azerbaijan; Portugal; Kazakhstan; Bulgaria; Spain
Wildcard	—	—	1	Ukraine
Women's pairs – 6 female pairs
2024 Acrobatic Gymnastics World Championships	(Portugal) Guimarães	19–22 September 2024	5	Belgium; Ukraine; Israel; United States; Portugal
Wildcard	—	—	1	Australia
Mixed pairs – 6 mixed pairs
2024 Acrobatic Gymnastics World Championships	(Portugal) Guimarães	19–22 September 2024	5	Azerbaijan; Ukraine; Israel; Portugal; Kazakhstan
Wildcard	—	—	1	Spain
Men's group – 6 male groups
2024 Acrobatic Gymnastics World Championships	(Portugal) Guimarães	19–22 September 2024	5	China; Israel; Ukraine; Azerbaijan; Great Britain
Wildcard	—	—	1	Germany
Women's group – 6 female groups
2024 Acrobatic Gymnastics World Championships	(Portugal) Guimarães	19–22 September 2024	5	China; Israel; United States; Ukraine; Netherlands
Wildcard	—	—	1	Germany

=== Aerobic gymnastics ===
Qualification was as follows:

Event	Location	Dates	Total places	Qualified NOCs
Aerobic dance – 6 pairs
2024 Aerobic Gymnastics World Championships	(Italy) Pesaro	27–29 September 2024	5	Hungary; Romania; South Korea; Italy; China
Wildcard	—	—	1	Australia
Groups – 6 groups
2024 Aerobic Gymnastics World Championships	(Italy) Pesaro	27–29 September 2024	5	China; Italy; France; Hungary; Spain
Wildcard	—	—	1	Romania
Pairs – 6 pairs
2024 Aerobic Gymnastics World Championships	(Italy) Pesaro	27–29 September 2024	5	Japan; Azerbaijan; Brazil; Ukraine; Italy
Wildcard	—	—	1	Romania
Trios – 6 trios
2024 Aerobic Gymnastics World Championships	(Italy) Pesaro	27–29 September 2024	5	China; France; Bulgaria; Romania; Italy
Wildcard	—	—	1	Vietnam

=== Parkour ===
Qualification was as follows:

Event	Location	Dates	Total places	Qualified NOCs
Men
2024 Parkour World Championships	(Japan) Kitakyushu	15–17 November 2024	6 (Note: Five top competitors, along with either a host or continental athlete)	Switzerland; Italy; Czech Republic; Slovakia; Netherlands; Mexico
Wildcard	—	—	6	Austria; China; Colombia; France; Japan; United States
Women
2024 Parkour World Championships	(Japan) Kitakyushu	15–17 November 2024	6	United States; Sweden; Netherlands; Argentina; Spain; China
Wildcard	—	—	6	Australia; Bulgaria; Czech Republic; Japan; Mexico; Thailand

=== Trampoline gymnastics ===
Qualification was as follows:

Event	Location	Dates	Total places	Qualified NOCs
Men's double Mini – 8 male gymnasts
2023 Trampoline Gymnastics World Championships	(United Kingdom) Birmingham	9–12 November 2023	8	United States; Great Britain; Canada; Portugal; Spain; Australia; Argentina; Belgium
Women's double Mini – 8 female gymnasts
2023 Trampoline Gymnastics World Championships	(United Kingdom) Birmingham	9–12 November 2023	8	Portugal; United States; Spain; Great Britain; Canada; Germany; Sweden; Australia
Men's synchronised – 8 male gymnasts
2023 Trampoline Gymnastics World Championships	(United Kingdom) Birmingham	9–12 November 2023	8	Ukraine; France; Great Britain; United States; Portugal; Germany; Netherlands; Sweden
Women's synchronised – 8 female gymnasts
2023 Trampoline Gymnastics World Championships	(United Kingdom) Birmingham	9–12 November 2023	8	Great Britain; Japan; United States; France; China; Canada; Australia; Czech Republic
Men's tumbling – 8 male gymnasts
2023 Trampoline Gymnastics World Championships	(United Kingdom) Birmingham	9–12 November 2023	8	Azerbaijan; United States; Great Britain; Australia; Denmark; Portugal; Ukraine; France
Women's tumbling – 8 female gymnasts
2023 Trampoline Gymnastics World Championships	(United Kingdom) Birmingham	9–12 November 2023	8	France; United States; Great Britain; Greece; Belgium; Japan; Australia; Ukraine

== Ju-jitsu ==
Qualification is as follows:

Event	Location	Dates	Total places	Qualified NOCs
Duo – Show Open
JJIF World Games Rankings	—	—	7	Austria; Cambodia; Greece; Italy; Montenegro; Romania; Thailand
Duo – Team Open
JJIF World Games Rankings	—	—	6	Austria; Belgium; Germany; Greece; Italy; Thailand
Duo for athletes with impairment – Mental Impairment
JJIF World Games Rankings	—	—	6	Austria; Austria; Brazil; Italy; Mongolia; Sweden
Duo for athletes with impairment – Physical Impairment
JJIF World Games Rankings	—	—	6	Brazil; China; Colombia; Germany; Mexico; Romania
Duo for athletes with impairment – Visual Impairment
JJIF World Games Rankings	—	—	6	Brazil; China; Colombia; Germany; Romania; Romania
Fighting – 52kg Women
JJIF World Games Rankings	—	—	6	France; Greece; Italy; Switzerland; Thailand; Chinese Taipei
Fighting – 57kg Women
JJIF World Games Rankings	—	—	6	Denmark; Germany; Netherlands; Panama; Sweden; Vietnam
Fighting – 62kg Men
JJIF World Games Rankings	—	—	6	Colombia; Denmark; Iraq; Kazakhstan; Netherlands; Ukraine
Fighting – 63kg Women
JJIF World Games Rankings	—	—	6	Austria; Brazil; Denmark; France; Germany; Thailand
Fighting – 69kg Men
JJIF World Games Rankings	—	—	6	Individual Neutral Athletes; France; Italy; Kazakhstan; Mauritius; Slovenia
Fighting – 77kg Men
JJIF World Games Rankings	—	—	6	Ivory Coast; Denmark; France; Kazakhstan; Netherlands; Uruguay
Jiu-Jitsu (Ne-Waza) – 52kg Women
JJIF World Games Rankings	—	—	6	Colombia; Germany; Israel; South Korea; Philippines; United Arab Emirates
Jiu-Jitsu (Ne-Waza) – 57kg Women
JJIF World Games Rankings	—	—	6	Canada; Hungary; Mongolia; Philippines; Sweden; United Arab Emirates
Jiu-Jitsu (Ne-Waza) – 63kg Women
JJIF World Games Rankings	—	—	6	France; Hungary; Israel; South Korea; Switzerland; United Arab Emirates
Jiu-Jitsu (Ne-Waza) – 69kg Men
JJIF World Games Rankings	—	—	6	Belgium; Kazakhstan; South Korea; Mongolia; United Arab Emirates; Ukraine
Jiu-Jitsu (Ne-Waza) – 77kg Men
JJIF World Games Rankings	—	—	6	Canada; Israel; Kazakhstan; Norway; Thailand; United Arab Emirates
Jiu-Jitsu (Ne-Waza) – 85kg Men
JJIF World Games Rankings	—	—	6	Canada; Israel; South Korea; Saudi Arabia; Portugal; United Arab Emirates
Jiu-Jitsu (Ne-Waza) – Open Men
JJIF World Games Rankings	—	—	18	Belgium; Canada; Canada; Israel; Israel; Kazakhstan; Kazakhstan; South Korea; South Korea; Saudi Arabia; Mongolia; Norway; Portugal; Thailand; United Arab Emirates; United Arab Emirates; United Arab Emirates; Ukraine
Jiu-Jitsu (Ne-Waza) – Open Women
JJIF World Games Rankings	—	—	18	Canada; Colombia; France; Germany; Hungary; Hungary; Israel; Israel; South Korea; South Korea; Mongolia; Philippines; Philippines; Switzerland; Sweden; United Arab Emirates; United Arab Emirates; United Arab Emirates

== Karate ==
Qualification is as follows:

=== Kata ===
Event	Location	Dates	Total places	Qualified NOCs
Men's – 8 karatekas
Host nation	—	—	1	China
2023 World Karate Championships	(Hungary) Budapest	24–29 October 2023	3	Spain; Japan; United States
WKF World Rankings	—	31 March 2025	3	Italy; Sweden; Slovakia
Continental quota	—	—	1	Egypt
Women's – 8 karatekas
Host nation	—	—	1	China
2023 World Karate Championships	(Hungary) Budapest	24–29 October 2023	3	Japan; Hong Kong; Italy
WKF World Rankings	—	31 March 2025	3	United States; Iran; Spain
Continental quota	—	—	1	Colombia

=== Kumite ===
Event	Location	Dates	Total places	Qualified NOCs
Men's 60 kg – 8 karatekas
Host nation	—	—	1	China
2023 World Karate Championships	(Hungary) Budapest	24–29 October 2023	3	Greece; Kazakhstan; Italy
WKF World Rankings	—	31 March 2025	3	Japan; Turkey; Kuwait
Continental quota	—	—	1	Morocco
Men's 67 kg – 8 karatekas
Host nation	—	—	1	China
2023 World Karate Championships	(Hungary) Budapest	24–29 October 2023	3	Montenegro; Kazakhstan; Saudi Arabia
WKF World Rankings	—	31 March 2025	3	Japan; Brazil; Jordan
Continental quota	—	—	1	Morocco
Men's 75 kg – 8 karatekas
Host nation	—	—	1	China
2023 World Karate Championships	(Hungary) Budapest	24–29 October 2023	3	Egypt; Hungary; Ukraine
WKF World Rankings	—	31 March 2025	3	France; Kazakhstan; Japan
Continental quota	—	—	1	Australia
Men's 84 kg – 8 karatekas
Host nation	—	—	1	China
2023 World Karate Championships	(Hungary) Budapest	24–29 October 2023	3	Egypt; Jordan; Ukraine
WKF World Rankings	—	31 March 2025	3	Japan; Greece; Croatia
Continental quota	—	—	1	Netherlands
Men's +84 kg – 8 karatekas
Host nation	—	—	1	China
2023 World Karate Championships	(Hungary) Budapest	24–29 October 2023	3	France; Egypt; Iran
WKF World Rankings	—	31 March 2025	3	Aruba; Croatia; Aruba
Continental quota	—	—	1	United States
Women's 50 kg – 8 karatekas
Host nation	—	—	1	China
2023 World Karate Championships	(Hungary) Budapest	24–29 October 2023	3	Kazakhstan; Italy; Venezuela
WKF World Rankings	—	31 March 2025	3	Croatia; Iran; Canada
Continental quota	—	—	1	Algeria
Women's 55 kg – 8 karatekas
Host nation	—	—	1	China
2023 World Karate Championships	(Hungary) Budapest	24–29 October 2023	3	Turkey; Bulgaria; Ukraine
WKF World Rankings	—	31 March 2025	3	Chile; Germany; Canada
Continental quota	—	—	1	Japan
Women's 61 kg – 8 karatekas
Host nation	—	—	~~1~~	~~China~~ (Note: Qualified through 2023 World Karate Championships.)
2023 World Karate Championships	(Hungary) Budapest	24–29 October 2023	4	China; Turkey; Egypt; France
WKF World Rankings	—	31 March 2025	3	Kazakhstan; Germany; Japan
Continental quota	—	—	1	Tunisia
Women's 68 kg – 8 karatekas
Host nation	—	—	1	China
2023 World Karate Championships	(Hungary) Budapest	24–29 October 2023	3	Azerbaijan; Switzerland; Indonesia
WKF World Rankings	—	31 March 2025	3	Japan; France; Turkey
Continental quota	—	—	1	Egypt
Women's +68 kg – 8 karatekas
Host nation	—	—	1	China
2023 World Karate Championships	(Hungary) Budapest	24–29 October 2023	3	Spain; Egypt; Italy
WKF World Rankings	—	31 March 2025	3	Kazakhstan; Germany; France
Continental quota	—	—	1	Australia

== Kickboxing ==
Qualification is as follows:

Event	Location	Dates	Total places	Qualified NOCs
K1 Style – 52 kg Women
Host nation	—	—	1	China
2024 Asian Kickboxing Championships	(Cambodia) Phnom Penh	6–13 October 2024	1	Vietnam
2024 Pan American Kickboxing Championships	(Chile) Santiago	30 October–3 November 2024	1	Brazil
2024 European Kickboxing Championships	(Greece) Athens	1–10 November 2024	4	Israel; Czech Republic; Turkey; Ukraine
2024 African Kickboxing Championships	(South Africa) Johannesburg	9–12 December 2024	1	Morocco
K1 Style – 60 kg Women
Host nation	—	—	1	China
2024 Asian Kickboxing Championships	(Cambodia) Phnom Penh	6–13 October 2024	1	Indonesia
2024 Pan American Kickboxing Championships	(Chile) Santiago	30 October–3 November 2024	1	Brazil
2024 European Kickboxing Championships	(Greece) Athens	1–10 November 2024	4	Netherlands; Portugal; Slovakia; Ukraine
2024 African Kickboxing Championships	(South Africa) Johannesburg	9–12 December 2024	1	Algeria
K1 Style –63.5 kg Men
Host nation	—	—	0	—
2024 Asian Kickboxing Championships	(Cambodia) Phnom Penh	6–13 October 2024	2	Uzbekistan; Thailand
2024 Pan American Kickboxing Championships	(Chile) Santiago	30 October–3 November 2024	1	Brazil
2024 European Kickboxing Championships	(Greece) Athens	1–10 November 2024	4	Azerbaijan; Moldova; Switzerland; Ukraine
2024 African Kickboxing Championships	(South Africa) Johannesburg	9–12 December 2024	1	Madagascar
K1 Style – 70 kg Women
Host nation	—	—	0	—
2024 Asian Kickboxing Championships	(Cambodia) Phnom Penh	6–13 October 2024	1	Philippines
2024 Pan American Kickboxing Championships	(Chile) Santiago	30 October–3 November 2024	1	Brazil
2024 European Kickboxing Championships	(Greece) Athens	1–10 November 2024	4	Hungary; Israel; Portugal; Serbia
2024 Oceania Kickboxing Championships	(Australia) Canberra	17 November 2024	1	New Zealand
2024 African Kickboxing Championships	(South Africa) Johannesburg	9–12 December 2024	1	Egypt
K1 Style – 75 kg Men
Host nation	—	—	0	—
2024 Asian Kickboxing Championships	(Cambodia) Phnom Penh	6–13 October 2024	1	Uzbekistan
2024 Pan American Kickboxing Championships	(Chile) Santiago	30 October–3 November 2024	2	United States; Argentina
2024 European Kickboxing Championships	(Greece) Athens	1–10 November 2024	4	Bulgaria; Israel; Poland; Hungary
2024 African Kickboxing Championships	(South Africa) Johannesburg	9–12 December 2024	1	Morocco
K1 Style – 91 kg Men
Host nation	—	—	1	China
2024 Asian Kickboxing Championships	(Cambodia) Phnom Penh	6–13 October 2024	1	Uzbekistan
2024 European Kickboxing Championships	(Greece) Athens	1–10 November 2024	5	Ukraine; Turkey; France; Portugal; Poland
2024 African Kickboxing Championships	(South Africa) Johannesburg	9–12 December 2024	1	Egypt
Point Fighting – 50 kg Women
Host nation	—	—	1	China
2024 Asian Kickboxing Championships	(Cambodia) Phnom Penh	6–13 October 2024	1	Indonesia
2024 Pan American Kickboxing Championships	(Chile) Santiago	30 October–3 November 2024	1	Guatemala
2024 European Kickboxing Championships	(Greece) Athens	1–10 November 2024	4	Italy; Hungary; Turkey; Slovenia
2024 Oceania Kickboxing Championships	(Australia) Canberra	17 November 2024	1	Australia
Point Fighting – 60 kg Women
Host nation	—	—	0	—
2024 Asian Kickboxing Championships	(Cambodia) Phnom Penh	6–13 October 2024	1	Uzbekistan
2024 Pan American Kickboxing Championships	(Chile) Santiago	30 October–3 November 2024	1	Canada
2024 European Kickboxing Championships	(Greece) Athens	1–10 November 2024	4	Italy; Bulgaria; Slovakia; Great Britain
2024 Oceania Kickboxing Championships	(Australia) Canberra	17 November 2024	1	New Zealand
2024 African Kickboxing Championships	(South Africa) Johannesburg	9–12 December 2024	1	South Africa
Point Fighting – 63 kg Men
Host nation	—	—	0	—
2024 Asian Kickboxing Championships	(Cambodia) Phnom Penh	6–13 October 2024	1	Uzbekistan
2024 Pan American Kickboxing Championships	(Chile) Santiago	30 October–3 November 2024	2	Mexico; Chile
2024 European Kickboxing Championships	(Greece) Athens	1–10 November 2024	4	Hungary; Bulgaria; Italy; Germany
2024 African Kickboxing Championships	(South Africa) Johannesburg	9–12 December 2024	1	South Africa
Point Fighting – 70 kg Women
Host nation	—	—	0	—
2024 Asian Kickboxing Championships	(Cambodia) Phnom Penh	6–13 October 2024	2	Uzbekistan; Iran
2024 Pan American Kickboxing Championships	(Chile) Santiago	30 October–3 November 2024	1	Mexico
2024 European Kickboxing Championships	(Greece) Athens	1–10 November 2024	4	Great Britain; Germany; Hungary; Slovenia
2024 African Kickboxing Championships	(South Africa) Johannesburg	9–12 December 2024	1	South Africa
Point Fighting – 74 kg Men
Host nation	—	—	1	China
2024 Asian Kickboxing Championships	(Cambodia) Phnom Penh	6–13 October 2024	1	Uzbekistan
2024 Pan American Kickboxing Championships	(Chile) Santiago	30 October–3 November 2024	1	Guatemala
2024 European Kickboxing Championships	(Greece) Athens	1–10 November 2024	4	Austria; Greece; Hungary; Netherlands
2024 African Kickboxing Championships	(South Africa) Johannesburg	9–12 December 2024	1	South Africa
Point Fighting – 84 kg Men
Host nation	—	—	0	China
2024 Asian Kickboxing Championships	(Cambodia) Phnom Penh	6–13 October 2024	1	Iraq
2024 Pan American Kickboxing Championships	(Chile) Santiago	30 October–3 November 2024	2	Canada; Mexico
2024 European Kickboxing Championships	(Greece) Athens	1–10 November 2024	4	Austria; Great Britain; Greece; Ireland
2024 African Kickboxing Championships	(South Africa) Johannesburg	9–12 December 2024	1	South Africa

== Korfball ==
Qualification is as follows:

Event	Location	Dates	Total places	Qualified NOCs
Indoor – 8 teams
Host nation	—	—	1	China
2023 IKF World Korfball Championship	(Chinese Taipei) Taipei	20–29 October 2023	7	Netherlands; Chinese Taipei; Belgium; Czech Republic; Suriname; Germany; Portugal
Beach – 8 teams
Host nation	—	—	1	China
			7	Australia; Belgium; Hungary; Netherlands; Poland; Chinese Taipei; United States

== Lacrosse ==
Qualification is as follows:

Event	Location	Dates	Total places	Qualified NOCs
Women's – 8 teams
Host nation	—	—	1	China
World Games 2022	(United States) Birmingham	12–16 July 2022	4	Canada; United States; Australia; Great Britain
2025 Asia-Pacific Women's Lacrosse Championship	(Australia) Bokarina	6–11 July 2025	1	Japan
2025 Women's European Sixes Qualifier	(Portugal) Vila Real de Santo António	5–6 March 2025	2	Ireland; Czech Republic

== Lifesaving ==
Qualification is as follows:

Event	Location	Dates	Total places	Qualified NOCs
100m Manikin Carry with Fins Men – 8 athletes
Host nation	—	—	0	—
WG Qualifying Time – 49.55	—	31 January 2025	8	Australia; Spain; Spain; France; Germany; Italy; Italy; New Zealand
100m Manikin Carry with Fins Women – 8 athletes
Host nation	—	—	0	—
WG Qualifying Time – 55.46	—	31 January 2025	8	Spain; Spain; Germany; Germany; Italy; Italy; New Zealand; New Zealand
100m Manikin Tow with Fins Men – 8 athletes
Host nation	—	—	0	—
WG Qualifying Time – 55.15	—	31 January 2025	8	Australia; Australia; France; France; Italy; Italy; Netherlands; New Zealand
100m Manikin Tow with Fins Women – 8 athletes
Host nation	—	—	0	—
WG Qualifying Time – 1:02.33	—	31 January 2025	8	Australia; Spain; Germany; Germany; Italy; Italy; New Zealand; New Zealand
100m Rescue Medley Men – 8 athletes
Host nation	—	—	0	—
WG Qualifying Time – 1:04.87	—	31 January 2025	8	Australia; Australia; Spain; France; Italy; Italy; New Zealand; Poland
100m Rescue Medley Women – 8 athletes
Host nation	—	—	0	—
WG Qualifying Time – 1:15.25	—	31 January 2025	8	Australia; France; France; Germany; Germany; Italy; Italy; New Zealand
200m Super Lifesaver Men – 8 athletes
Host nation	—	—	0	—
WG Qualifying Time – 2:18.35	—	31 January 2025	8	Australia; Australia; France; France; Germany; Germany; Italy; Italy
200m Super Lifesaver Women – 8 athletes
Host nation	—	—	0	—
WG Qualifying Time – 2:33.08	—	31 January 2025	8	Australia; Spain; France; France; Germany; Germany; Italy; Italy
50m Manikin Carry Men – 8 athletes
Host nation	—	—	0	—
WG Qualifying Time – 30.68	—	31 January 2025	8	Australia; Germany; Hungary; Hungary; Italy; Italy; New Zealand; Poland
50m Manikin Carry Women – 8 athletes
Host nation	—	—	0	—
WG Qualifying Time – 36.78	—	31 January 2025	8	Spain; France; France; Germany; Germany; Italy; Italy; New Zealand
Team 4x25m Manikin Relay Men – 8 athletes
Host nation	—	—	0	—
WG Qualifying Time – 1:13.65	—	31 January 2025	8	Australia; Spain; France; Germany; Hungary; Italy; Japan; Poland
Team 4x25m Manikin Relay Women – 8 athletes
Host nation	—	—	0	—
WG Qualifying Time – 1:28.42	—	31 January 2025	8	Australia; Belgium; Spain; France; Germany; Italy; Japan; Poland
Team 4x50m Medley Relay Men – 8 athletes
Host nation	—	—	0	—
WG Qualifying Time – 1:39.12	—	31 January 2025	8	Australia; Spain; France; Germany; Hungary; Italy; Japan; Poland
Team 4x50m Medley Relay Women – 8 athletes
Host nation	—	—	0	—
WG Qualifying Time – 1:50.25	—	31 January 2025	8	Australia; Belgium; Spain; France; Germany; Italy; Japan; Poland
Team 4x50m Pool Life Saver Relay Men – 8 athletes
Host nation	—	—	0	—
WG Qualifying Time – 2:02.08	—	31 January 2025	8	Australia; France; Germany; Hungary; Italy; Japan; New Zealand; Poland
Team 4x50m Pool Life Saver Relay Women – 8 athletes
Host nation	—	—	0	—
WG Qualifying Time – 2:02.08	—	31 January 2025	8	Australia; Belgium; Spain; France; Germany; Italy; Japan; Poland

== Muaythai ==
Qualification is as follows:

Event	Location	Dates	Total places	Qualified NOCs
Men's 57 kg – 8 muaythai practitioners
Host nation	—	—	1	China
IFMA Global Rankings	—	31 December 2024	7	Israel; Ukraine; France; United Arab Emirates; Vietnam; Afghanistan; Armenia
Men's 71 kg – 8 muaythai practitioners
Host nation	—	—	1	China
IFMA Global Rankings	—	31 December 2024	7	Individual Neutral Athletes; Thailand; Ukraine; Morocco; ~~Portugal~~; Italy; Israel
Reallocation	—	17 January 2025	1	Kazakhstan
Men's 86 kg – 8 muaythai practitioners
Host nation	—	—	1	China
IFMA Global Rankings	—	31 December 2024	4	United States; Croatia; ~~Ukraine~~; Sweden; South Africa; ~~Algeria~~; ~~Canada~~
Reallocation	—	17 January 2025	3	Uzbekistan; Mexico; Moldova
Women's 48 kg – 8 muaythai practitioners
Host nation	—	—	1	China
IFMA Global Rankings	—	31 December 2024	7	Ukraine; Thailand; Morocco; Finland; Turkey; Saudi Arabia; Singapore
Women's 54 kg – 8 muaythai practitioners
Host nation	—	—	1	China
IFMA Global Rankings	—	31 December 2024	7	Mexico; Poland; United States; Turkey; Slovakia; Belgium; Hungary
Women's 60 kg – 8 muaythai practitioners
Host nation	—	—	1	China
IFMA Global Rankings	—	31 December 2024	7	Turkey; United States; Poland; Austria; Individual Neutral Athletes; Estonia; Australia

== Orienteering ==
Qualification is as follows:

Event	Location	Dates	Total places	Qualified NOCs
Middle-Distance Men – 40 athletes
Host nation	—	—	2	China
Point System (2024 World Orienteering Championships + Orienteering World Ranking)	(Scotland) Edinburgh	12 July 2024; 31 October 2024	38	Australia (2); Austria (2); Belgium; Brazil (2); Canada (2); Czech Republic (2); Spain (2); Great Britain (2); Germany (2); Hong Kong; Hungary (2); Italy (2); Japan (2); Kazakhstan; Latvia (2); New Zealand (2); Poland (2); Switzerland (3); Slovakia; Sweden (2); Ukraine
Middle-Distance Women – 40 athletes
Host nation	—	—	2	China
Point System (2024 World Orienteering Championships + Orienteering World Ranking)	(Scotland) Edinburgh	12 July 2024; 31 October 2024	38	Australia (2); Austria (2); Belgium; Brazil (2); Czech Republic (2); Spain (2); Great Britain (2); Germany (2); Hong Kong; Hungary (2); Italy (2); Japan (2); Kazakhstan; Latvia (2); New Zealand (2); Poland (2); Portugal; South Africa; Switzerland (2); Slovakia; Sweden (2); Chinese Taipei; Ukraine
Sprint Men – 40 athletes
Host nation	—	—	2	China
Point System (2024 World Orienteering Championships + Orienteering World Ranking)	(Scotland) Edinburgh	12 July 2024; 31 October 2024	38	Australia (2); Austria (2); Belgium; Brazil (2); Canada (2); Czech Republic (2); Spain (2); Great Britain (2); Germany (2); Hong Kong; Hungary (2); Italy (2); Japan (2); Kazakhstan; Latvia (2); New Zealand (2); Poland (2); Switzerland (3); Slovakia; Sweden (2); Ukraine
Sprint Women – 40 athletes
Host nation	—	—	2	China
Point System (2024 World Orienteering Championships + Orienteering World Ranking)	(Scotland) Edinburgh	12 July 2024; 31 October 2024	38	Australia (2); Austria (2); Belgium; Brazil (2); Czech Republic (2); Spain (2); Great Britain (2); Germany (2); Hong Kong; Hungary (2); Italy (2); Japan (2); Kazakhstan; Latvia (2); New Zealand (2); Poland (2); Portugal; South Africa; Switzerland (2); Slovakia; Sweden (2); Chinese Taipei; Ukraine
Sprint Relay – 16 federations
Host nation	—	—	1	China
Point System (2024 World Orienteering Championships + Orienteering World Ranking)	(Scotland) Edinburgh	12 July 2024; 31 October 2024	15	Australia; Austria; Brazil; Czech Republic; Spain; Great Britain; Germany; Hungary; Italy; Japan; Latvia; New Zealand; Poland; Switzerland; Sweden

== Powerboating ==
Qualification is as follows:

Event	Location	Dates	Total places	Qualified NOCs
Nations Cup – 11 couples
Host nation	—	—	2	China
Individual qualifying races	—	21 May 2023–31 March 2025	9	Belgium; Canada; Czech Republic; Germany; Japan; South Korea; Poland; Slovakia; United States
MotoSurf Single Men – 24 athletes
Host nation	—	—	4	China
Individual qualifying races	—	21 May 2023–31 March 2025	20	Belgium; Canada; Cyprus; Czech Republic (2); Germany; Japan (2); South Korea (2); Kuwait (2); Poland; Slovakia (2); Sweden (2); Thailand; United States (2)
MotoSurf Single Women – 19 athletes
Host nation	—	—	4	China
Individual qualifying races	—	21 May 2023–31 March 2025	15	Belgium; Canada; Czech Republic (2); Germany; Japan; South Korea (2); Mexico (2); Poland; Slovakia (2); United States (2)

== Powerlifting ==
Qualification is as follows:

=== Classic powerlifting ===
Event	Location	Dates	Total places	Qualified NOCs
Men's lightweight – 8 athletes
2024 IPF Open World Classic Powerlifting Championships	(Lithuania) Druskininkai	15–23 June 2024	6	United States; United States; Thailand; France; France; Spain
Wildcards	—	—	2	Japan; Virgin Islands
Men's middleweight – 8 athletes
2024 IPF Open World Classic Powerlifting Championships	(Lithuania) Druskininkai	15–23 June 2024	6	United States; United States; Great Britain; Norway; New Zealand; Hungary
Wildcards	—	—	2	Chile; China
Men's heavyweight – 8 athletes
2024 IPF Open World Classic Powerlifting Championships	(Lithuania) Druskininkai	15–23 June 2024	6	Sweden; Sweden; United States; United States; Bulgaria; Ukraine
Wildcards	—	—	2	China; Tunisia
Men's super-heavyweight – 8 athletes
2024 IPF Open World Classic Powerlifting Championships	(Lithuania) Druskininkai	15–23 June 2024	6	United States; United States; Lebanon; Georgia; Great Britain; France
Wildcards	—	—	2	Hungary; Spain
Women's lightweight – 8 athletes
2024 IPF Open World Classic Powerlifting Championships	(Lithuania) Druskininkai	15–23 June 2024	6	France; New Zealand; New Zealand; United States; Canada; Netherlands
Wildcards	—	—	2	China; Singapore
Women's middleweight – 8 athletes
2024 IPF Open World Classic Powerlifting Championships	(Lithuania) Druskininkai	15–23 June 2024	6	France; France; United States; Great Britain; Italy; Italy
Wildcards	—	—	2	China; Sweden
Women's heavyweight – 8 athletes
2024 IPF Open World Classic Powerlifting Championships	(Lithuania) Druskininkai	15–23 June 2024	6	Italy; Poland; France; New Zealand; Norway; United States
Wildcards	—	—	2	Great Britain; Jamaica
Women's super-heavyweight – 8 athletes
2024 IPF Open World Classic Powerlifting Championships	(Lithuania) Druskininkai	15–23 June 2024	6	United States; United States; Belgium; Great Britain; Canada; Canada
Wildcards	—	—	2	Nauru; South Africa

=== Equipped powerlifting ===
Event	Location	Dates	Total places	Qualified NOCs
Men's lightweight – 8 athletes
2024 IPF Open World Equipped Powerlifting Championships	(Iceland) Reykjavík	11–17 November 2024	6	Chinese Taipei; Sweden; Ecuador; Chinese Taipei; United States; Japan
Wildcards	—	—	2	Philippines; France
Men's middleweight – 8 athletes
2024 IPF Open World Equipped Powerlifting Championships	(Iceland) Reykjavík	11–17 November 2024	6	Poland; Ukraine; United States; Chinese Taipei; Ecuador; Ukraine
Wildcards	—	—	2	Japan; Ecuador
Men's heavyweight – 8 athletes
2024 IPF Open World Equipped Powerlifting Championships	(Iceland) Reykjavík	11–17 November 2024	6	Ukraine; United States; Ukraine; Denmark; Ecuador; Norway
Wildcards	—	—	2	China; South Africa
Men's super-heavyweight – 8 athletes
2024 IPF Open World Equipped Powerlifting Championships	(Iceland) Reykjavík	11–17 November 2024	6	Chinese Taipei; Ukraine; France; United States; Ukraine; Chinese Taipei
Wildcards	—	—	2	China; United States
Women's lightweight – 8 athletes
2024 IPF Open World Equipped Powerlifting Championships	(Iceland) Reykjavík	11–17 November 2024	6	Japan; Poland; Ukraine; Puerto Rico; Canada; Ukraine
Wildcards	—	—	2	Chinese Taipei; Finland
Women's middleweight – 8 athletes
2024 IPF Open World Equipped Powerlifting Championships	(Iceland) Reykjavík	11–17 November 2024	6	United States; Ukraine; Italy; Norway; Chinese Taipei; Chinese Taipei
Wildcards	—	—	2	China; United States
Women's heavyweight – 8 athletes
2024 IPF Open World Equipped Powerlifting Championships	(Iceland) Reykjavík	11–17 November 2024	6	United States; Norway; Sweden; United States; Brazil; Sweden
Wildcards	—	—	2	Germany; Norway
Women's super-heavyweight – 8 athletes
2024 IPF Open World Equipped Powerlifting Championships	(Iceland) Reykjavík	11–17 November 2024	6	Canada; Iceland; Ukraine; Ukraine; Luxembourg; United States
Wildcards	—	—	2	Norway; Philippines

== Racquetball ==
Qualification is as follows:

Event	Location	Dates	Total places	Qualified NOCs
16 Mixed doubles (1 man + 1 women)
Host nation	—	—	1	China
2024 Racquetball World Championships	(United States) San Diego	24–31 August 2024	15	Argentina; Bolivia; Canada; Costa Rica; Dominican Republic; Germany; Guatemala; India; Ireland; Italy; Japan; Mexico; South Korea; Chinese Taipei; United States

== Roller sports ==
=== Inline freestyle ===
Qualification is as follows:

Event	Location	Dates	Total places	Qualified NOCs
Men's classic slalom – 9 skaters
Host nation	—	—	2	China; China
2024 World Skate Games	(Italy) Rome	11–14 September 2024	6	Italy; Italy; Chinese Taipei; Spain; Chinese Taipei; Japan
The World Game Series	Hong Kong	12–13 October 2024	1	Japan
Men's speed slalom – 9 skaters
Host nation	—	—	2	China; China
2024 World Skate Games	(Italy) Rome	11–14 September 2024	6	Iran; Iran; Chinese Taipei; Chinese Taipei; Thailand; India
The World Game Series	Hong Kong	12–13 October 2024	1	Spain
Women's classic slalom – 9 skaters
Host nation	—	—	2	China; China
2024 World Skate Games	(Italy) Rome	11–14 September 2024	6	Spain; Chinese Taipei; Japan; Spain; India; Italy
The World Game Series	Hong Kong	12–13 October 2024	1	Italy
Women's speed slalom – 9 skaters
Host nation	—	—	2	China; China
2024 World Skate Games	(Italy) Rome	11–14 September 2024	6	Iran; Chinese Taipei; Iran; Chinese Taipei; Italy; Thailand
The World Game Series	Hong Kong	12–13 October 2024	1	Thailand

=== Inline hockey ===
Event	Location	Dates	Total places	Qualified NOCs
Men's team – 8 teams
Host nation	—	—	1	China
2024 World Skate Games	(Italy) Rome	11–14 September 2024	7	United States; Czech Republic; Italy; Namibia; Chinese Taipei; Argentina; Sweden

=== Speed skating ===
Event	Location	Dates	Total places	Qualified NOCs
Men's 15000m Road Elimination Race / 10000m Road Point Race / 10000m Track Elimination / 5000m Track Points – 15 skaters
Host nation	—	—	1	China
2024 Inline Speed Skating World Championships	(Italy) Montesilvano / Sulmona-Pescara	13–21 September 2024	14	Chile; Colombia; Ecuador; Spain; France; Germany; India; Italy; South Korea; New Zealand; Paraguay; Portugal; Switzerland; Chinese Taipei
Women's 15000m Road Elimination Race / 10000m Road Point Race / 10000m Track Elimination / 5000m Track Points – 15 skaters
Host nation	—	—	1	China
2024 Inline Speed Skating World Championships	(Italy) Montesilvano / Sulmona-Pescara	13–21 September 2024	14	Austria; Belgium; Chile; Colombia; Czech Republic; Ecuador; France; Germany; Hungary; Italy; Mexico; Netherlands; Chinese Taipei; Venezuela
Men's Road One Lap / 100m Road Sprint / 200m Track Dual Time Trial / 500m Track Sprint +D – 15 skaters
Host nation	—	—	1	China
2024 Inline Speed Skating World Championships	(Italy) Montesilvano / Sulmona-Pescara	13–21 September 2024	14	Brazil; Chile; Colombia; Czech Republic; Ecuador; Spain; France; Germany; Guatemala; Italy; Mexico; Portugal; Switzerland; Chinese Taipei
Women's Road One Lap / 100m Road Sprint / 200m Track Dual Time Trial / 500m Track Sprint +D – 15 skaters
Host nation	—	—	1	China
2024 Inline Speed Skating World Championships	(Italy) Montesilvano / Sulmona-Pescara	13–21 September 2024	14	Belgium; Chile; Colombia; Ecuador; El Salvador; Spain; France; Germany; Guatemala; Italy; South Korea; Chinese Taipei; United States; Venezuela
Men's 1000m Track Sprint – 30 skaters
Host nation	—	—	2	China
2024 Inline Speed Skating World Championships	(Italy) Montesilvano / Sulmona-Pescara	13–21 September 2024	28	Brazil; Chile (2); Colombia (2); Czech Republic; Ecuador (2); Spain (2); France (2); Germany (2); Guatemala; India; Italy (2); South Korea; Mexico; New Zealand; Paraguay; Portugal (2); Switzerland (2); Chinese Taipei (2)
Women's 1000m Track Sprint – 30 skaters
Host nation	—	—	2	China
2024 Inline Speed Skating World Championships	(Italy) Montesilvano / Sulmona-Pescara	13–21 September 2024	28	Austria; Belgium (2); Chile (2); Colombia (2); Czech Republic; Ecuador (2); El Salvador; Spain; France (2); Germany (2); Guatemala; Hungary; Italy (2); South Korea; Mexico; Netherlands; Chinese Taipei (2); United States; Venezuela (2)

== Sambo ==
Qualification is as follows:

Event	Location	Dates	Total places	Qualified NOCs
Men's 64 kg
Host nation	—	—	0	—
Asian and Oceanian rankings	—	—	2	Kazakhstan; Kyrgyzstan
European rankings	—	—	2	Individual Neutral Athletes; Armenia
African rankings	—	—	1	Morocco
Pan-American rankings	—	—	1	Venezuela
Wildcard	—	—	2	Italy; Ukraine
Men's 71 kg
Host nation	—	—	0	—
Asian and Oceanian rankings	—	—	2	Kazakhstan; Kyrgyzstan
European rankings	—	—	2	Individual Neutral Athletes; Ukraine
African rankings	—	—	1	Egypt
Pan-American rankings	—	—	1	Venezuela
Wildcard	—	—	2	Serbia; Croatia
Men's 79 kg
Host nation	—	—	0	—
Asian and Oceanian rankings	—	—	2	Kazakhstan; Uzbekistan
European rankings	—	—	2	Individual Neutral Athletes; Ukraine
African rankings	—	—	1	Cameroon
Pan-American rankings	—	—	1	Colombia
Wildcard	—	—	2	United States; Armenia
Men's 88 kg
Host nation	—	—	0	—
Asian and Oceanian rankings	—	—	2	Kyrgyzstan; Uzbekistan
European rankings	—	—	2	Individual Neutral Athletes; Ukraine
African rankings	—	—	1	Morocco
Pan-American rankings	—	—	1	Jamaica
Wildcard	—	—	2	Australia; Kazakhstan
Men's 98 kg
Host nation	—	—	0	—
Asian and Oceanian rankings	—	—	2	Kyrgyzstan; Uzbekistan
European rankings	—	—	2	Individual Neutral Athletes; Armenia
African rankings	—	—	1	Cameroon
Pan-American rankings	—	—	1	Venezuela
Wildcard	—	—	2	Netherlands; Ukraine
Women's 54 kg
Host nation	—	—	1	—
Asian and Oceanian rankings	—	—	2	Kazakhstan; Uzbekistan
European rankings	—	—	2	Individual Neutral Athletes; Armenia
African rankings	—	—	1	Egypt
Pan-American rankings	—	—	1	Venezuela
Wildcard	—	—	2	France; Kyrgyzstan
Women's 59 kg
Host nation	—	—	0	—
Asian and Oceanian rankings	—	—	2	Uzbekistan; Mongolia
European rankings	—	—	2	Individual Neutral Athletes; Individual Neutral Athletes
African rankings	—	—	1	Egypt
Pan-American rankings	—	—	1	Costa Rica
Wildcard	—	—	2	Armenia; Kazakhstan
Women's 65 kg
Host nation	—	—	0	—
Asian and Oceanian rankings	—	—	2	Kazakhstan; Uzbekistan
European rankings	—	—	2	Individual Neutral Athletes; Ukraine
African rankings	—	—	1	Morocco
Pan-American rankings	—	—	1	Dominican Republic
Wildcard	—	—	2	Israel; Venezuela
Women's 72 kg
Host nation	—	—	0	—
Asian and Oceanian rankings	—	—	2	Kazakhstan; Uzbekistan
European rankings	—	—	2	Individual Neutral Athletes; Israel
African rankings	—	—	1	Cameroon
Pan-American rankings	—	—	1	Mexico
Wildcard	—	—	2	Ukraine; Mongolia
Women's 80 kg
Host nation	—	—	0	—
Asian and Oceanian rankings	—	—	2	Kazakhstan; Uzbekistan
European rankings	—	—	1	Croatia
African rankings	—	—	1	Egypt
Pan-American rankings	—	—	1	Costa Rica
Wildcard	—	—	3	Mexico; Philippines; Kyrgyzstan

== Softball ==
Qualification is as follows:

Event	Location	Dates	Total places	Qualified NOCs
Men's
Host nation	—	—	0 (Note: China opted not to participate in the men's softball competition, two wild cards have been awarded to world No. 13 Singapore and No. 7 Czech Republic to grant continental representation.)	—
WBSC World Rankings	—	—	6	Argentina; Australia; Japan; Canada; Venezuela; United States
Wildcard	—	—	2	Czech Republic; Singapore
Women's
Host nation	—	—	1	China
WBSC World Rankings	—	—	6	United States; Japan; Puerto Rico; Chinese Taipei; Netherlands; Canada
Wildcard	—	—	1	Australia

== Sport climbing ==
Qualification is as follows:

Event	Location	Dates	Total places	Qualified NOCs
Men's – 36 climbers
Host nation	—	—	4	China
2024 IFSC Climbing World Cup	—	8 April–6 October 2024	32 (Note: The top 8 nations will each qualify 4 climbers. Due to universality rules, at least one nation from each continent will be included.)	Indonesia; Italy; Japan; Kazakhstan; New Zealand; South Africa; Ukraine; United States
Women's – 36 climbers
Host nation	—	—	4	China
2024 IFSC Climbing World Cup	—	8 April–6 October 2024	32	Indonesia; Italy; Japan; New Zealand; Poland; South Africa; South Korea; United States

== Squash ==
Qualification is as follows:

Event	Location	Dates	Total places	Qualified NOCs
Men's singles
Host nation	—	—	2	China
			30	Australia; Austria; Colombia (2); Croatia (2); Czech Republic; Egypt (2); Spain; Spain; France (2); Germany (2); Guatemala (2); Hong Kong (2); Hungary; Japan; Nigeria; Pakistan (2); Poland; Romania (2); South Africa; Switzerland (2); Ukraine
Women's singles
Host nation	—	—	3	China
			29	Australia; Austria; Colombia; Croatia; Czech Republic (2); Egypt (2); Spain; France (3); Germany (2); Hong Kong (2); Hungary; Italy; Japan (2); Poland (2); Romania (2); South Africa; Switzerland; Thailand; Ukraine; Zimbabwe

== Tug of war ==
Qualification is as follows:

Event	Location	Dates	Total places	Qualified NOCs
Men's 640 kg – 6 teams
2024 TWIF Outdoor World Championships	(Germany) Mannheim	5–8 September 2024	6	Belgium; Great Britain; Germany; Netherlands; Switzerland; Chinese Taipei
Women's 500 kg – 6 teams
2024 TWIF Outdoor World Championships	(Germany) Mannheim	5–8 September 2024	6	Great Britain; Germany; Switzerland; Sweden; Chinese Taipei; United States
Mixed 580 kg – 6 teams
2024 TWIF Outdoor World Championships	(Germany) Mannheim	5–8 September 2024	6	Belgium; Germany; Italy; Netherlands; Switzerland; Chinese Taipei

== Underwater sports ==
Qualification is as follows:

=== Finswimming ===
Event	Location	Dates	Total places	Qualified NOCs
Men's 50m apnoea
Host nation	—	—	2	China
World Finswimming Rankings	—	—	6	Individual Neutral Athletes; Colombia; Germany; Germany; South Korea; South Korea
Women's 50m apnoea
Host nation	—	—	2	China
World Finswimming Rankings	—	—	6	Individual Neutral Athletes; Colombia; France; South Korea; South Korea; Ukraine
Men's 100m bi-fins
Host nation	—	—	0	—
World Finswimming Rankings	—	—	8	Individual Neutral Athletes; Finland; Hungary; Hungary; Italy; Poland; Thailand; Ukraine
Women's 100m bi-fins
Host nation	—	—	0	—
World Finswimming Rankings	—	—	8	Germany; Hungary; Hungary; Italy; Chinese Taipei; Chinese Taipei; Ukraine; Ukraine
Men's 50m bi-fins
Host nation	—	—	0	—
World Finswimming Rankings	—	—	8	Individual Neutral Athletes; Finland; Greece; Hungary; Hungary; Italy; Poland; Ukraine
Women's 50m bi-fins
Host nation	—	—	0	—
World Finswimming Rankings	—	—	8	Individual Neutral Athletes; Individual Neutral Athletes; Germany; Hungary; Hungary; Italy; Italy; Chinese Taipei
Men's 100m surface
Host nation	—	—	0	—
World Finswimming Rankings	—	—	8	Colombia; Colombia; Egypt; Germany; Germany; Greece; South Korea; South Korea
Women's 100m surface
Host nation	—	—	1	China
World Finswimming Rankings	—	—	7	Individual Neutral Athletes; Colombia; Greece; South Korea; South Korea; Ukraine; Ukraine
Men's 200m surface
Host nation	—	—	0	—
World Finswimming Rankings	—	—	8	Colombia; Germany; Germany; Hungary; Hungary; South Korea; Turkey; Ukraine
Women's 200m surface
Host nation	—	—	1	China
World Finswimming Rankings	—	—	7	Individual Neutral Athletes; Individual Neutral Athletes; Germany; Hungary; Hungary; Ukraine; Ukraine
Men's 400m surface
Host nation	—	—	0	—
World Finswimming Rankings	—	—	8	Colombia; Hungary; Hungary; South Korea; South Korea; Poland; Turkey; Ukraine
Women's 400m surface
Host nation	—	—	0	—
World Finswimming Rankings	—	—	8	Individual Neutral Athletes; Croatia; Egypt; Germany; Hungary; Hungary; Ukraine; Ukraine
Men's surface relay
Host nation	—	—	1	China
World Finswimming Rankings	—	—	7	Colombia; France; Germany; Greece; Hungary; South Korea; Ukraine
Women's surface relay
Host nation	—	—	1	China
World Finswimming Rankings	—	—	7	Colombia; Germany; Greece; Hungary; Italy; South Korea; Ukraine

=== Freediving ===
Event	Location	Dates	Total places	Qualified NOCs
Men's dynamic with/without fins
Host nation	—	—	1	China
World Freediving Rankings	—	—	9	Individual Neutral Athletes; Croatia; Croatia; Cuba; France; Italy; Italy; Poland; Chinese Taipei
Women's dynamics with/without fins
Host nation	—	—	1	China
World Freediving Rankings	—	—	9	Croatia; France; Hungary; Italy; Italy; Japan; Poland; Poland; Ukraine

=== Freediving for athletes with impairment ===
Event	Location	Dates	Total places	Qualified NOCs
Men's dynamic with/without fins FFS1-FFS2
Host nation	—	—	2	China
World Freediving Rankings	—	—	6	Individual Neutral Athletes; Denmark; France; Italy; Italy; San Marino
Women's dynamics with/without fins FFS1-FFS2
Host nation	—	—	2	China
World Freediving Rankings	—	—	4	Individual Neutral Athletes; Colombia; Italy; Italy
Men's dynamic no fins FFS3-FFS4
Host nation	—	—	0	—
World Freediving Rankings	—	—	7	Individual Neutral Athletes; Colombia; France; France; Italy; Italy; Italy
Women's dynamics no fins FFS3-FFS4
Host nation	—	—	1	China
World Freediving Rankings	—	—	4	Colombia; France; Italy; Italy

== Waterski and Wakeboard ==
Event	Location	Dates	Total places	Qualified NOCs
Men's cable wakeboard
Host nation	—	—	2	China
			13	Croatia; France; Germany; Germany; Germany; Hungary; Italy; Kyrgyzstan; Philippines; Poland; Thailand; United States; United States
Women's cable wakeboard
Host nation	—	—	2	China
			13	Individual Neutral Athletes; Austria; Canada; Spain; Spain; France; Germany; Germany; Israel; Italy; Netherlands; Poland; Thailand
Men's wake surf
Host nation	—	—	1	China
			12	Canada; Germany; Hong Kong; Italy; Japan; North Korea; Singapore; Switzerland; Thailand; Chinese Taipei; Ukraine; United States
Women's wake surf
Host nation	—	—	1	China
			12	Austria; Canada; Great Britain; Germany; Hong Kong; Italy; Japan; South Korea; Singapore; Thailand; Chinese Taipei; Ukraine; United States
Men's freestyle wakeboard
Host nation	—	—	1	China
			14	Australia; Canada; Colombia; France; Germany; Hong Kong; Iran; Italy; Japan; South Korea; Latvia; Mexico; New Zealand; Chinese Taipei
Women's freestyle wakeboard
Host nation	—	—	2	China
			13	Argentina; Australia; Belgium; Chile; Spain; Great Britain; Italy; Italy; Japan; South Korea; Netherlands; New Zealand; United States

== Wushu ==
Qualification is as follows:

=== Sanda ===
Event	Location	Dates	Total places	Qualified NOCs
Women's 52 kg
2023 World Wushu Championships	(United States) Fort Worth	16–20 November 2023	8	Brazil; China; Indonesia; India; Italy; Lebanon; Chinese Taipei; Vietnam
Men's 56 kg
2023 World Wushu Championships	(United States) Fort Worth	16–20 November 2023	8	China; Indonesia; India; Kazakhstan; South Korea; Philippines; Uzbekistan; Vietnam
Women's 60 kg
2023 World Wushu Championships	(United States) Fort Worth	16–20 November 2023	8	Argentina; China; Spain; Hong Kong; India; Iran; Switzerland; Vietnam
Men's 70 kg
2023 World Wushu Championships	(United States) Fort Worth	16–20 November 2023	8	Azerbaijan; Hong Kong; Indonesia; Italy; Lebanon; Switzerland; Chinese Taipei; Vietnam
Women's 70 kg
2023 World Wushu Championships	(United States) Fort Worth	16–20 November 2023	8	Bermuda; Brazil; China; Ivory Coast; Egypt; Iran; Turkmenistan; Turkey
Men's 85 kg
2023 World Wushu Championships	(United States) Fort Worth	16–20 November 2023	8	Australia; Belgium; Colombia; Egypt; Spain; Germany; Mexico; Ukraine

=== Taolu ===
Event	Location	Dates	Total places	Qualified NOCs
Men's changquan-daoshu-gunshu combined
2023 World Wushu Championships	(United States) Fort Worth	16–20 November 2023	6	Singapore; Malaysia; Indonesia; France; South Korea; Brunei
2024 World Game Series	Hong Kong	12–13 October 2024	1	Singapore
Wildcards	—	—	2	China; United States
Women's changquan-jianshu-qiangshu combined
2023 World Wushu Championships	(United States) Fort Worth	16–20 November 2023	6	Hong Kong; Vietnam; Chinese Taipei; Canada; Japan; Malaysia
2024 World Game Series	Hong Kong	12–13 October 2024	1	Brazil
Wildcards	—	—	2	France; Great Britain
Men's nanquan-nangun combined
2023 World Wushu Championships	(United States) Fort Worth	16–20 November 2023	6	Brunei; South Korea; Chinese Taipei; Vietnam; Brazil; Japan
2024 World Game Series	Hong Kong	12–13 October 2024	1	Iran
Wildcards	—	—	2	Switzerland; Italy
Women's nanquan-nandao combined
2023 World Wushu Championships	(United States) Fort Worth	16–20 November 2023	6	Vietnam; Indonesia; Argentina; Italy; Portugal; Malaysia
2024 World Game Series	Hong Kong	12–13 October 2024	1	Uzbekistan
Wildcards	—	—	2	Iran; Singapore
Men's taijiquan-taijijian combined
2023 World Wushu Championships	(United States) Fort Worth	16–20 November 2023	6	Singapore; Chinese Taipei; Japan; Hong Kong; Philippines; Japan
2024 World Game Series	Hong Kong	12–13 October 2024	1	Brunei
Wildcards	—	—	2	Canada; Indonesia
Women's taijiquan-taijijian combined
2023 World Wushu Championships	(United States) Fort Worth	16–20 November 2023	6	Singapore; Malaysia; Philippines; Singapore; Japan; Chinese Taipei
2024 World Game Series	Hong Kong	12–13 October 2024	1	Brunei
Wildcards	—	—	2	China; Ukraine
