= Ju-jitsu at the 2017 World Games – Men's fighting 77 kg =

Men's fighting 77 kg at the 2017 World Games
- Venue: GEM Sports Complex
- Date: 29 July 2017
- Competitors: 6 from 6 nations

Medalists
1st place, gold medalist(s)		(Russia) Ilia Borok
2nd place, silver medalist(s)		(Germany) Andreas Knebl
3rd place, bronze medalist(s)		(Sweden) Fredrik Widgren

The men's fighting 77 kg competition in ju-jitsu at the 2017 World Games took place on 29 July 2017 at the GEM Sports Complex in Wrocław, Poland.

== Results ==
=== Elimination round ===
==== Group A ====
Rank	Athlete	B	W	L	Pts	Score
1	Ilia Borok (RUS)	2	2	0	59–3	+56
2	Andreas Knebl (GER)	2	1	1	16–58	–42
3	Saparmurat Nurmukhanbetov (KAZ)	2	0	2	11–25	–14

	Score	
Ilia Borok (RUS)	50–0	Andreas Knebl (GER)
Ilia Borok (RUS)	9–3	Saparmurat Nurmukhanbetov (KAZ)
Andreas Knebl (GER)	16–8	Saparmurat Nurmukhanbetov (KAZ)

==== Group B ====
Rank	Athlete	B	W	L	Pts	Score
1	Percy Kunsa (FRA)	2	2	0	17–13	+4
2	Fredrik Widgren (SWE)	2	1	1	23–9	+14
3	Jonathan Charlot (MRI)	2	0	2	7–25	–18

	Score	
Percy Kunsa (FRA)	8–7	Fredrik Widgren (SWE)
Percy Kunsa (FRA)	9–6	Jonathan Charlot (MRI)
Fredrik Widgren (SWE)	16–1	Jonathan Charlot (MRI)

=== Finals ===
Semifinals
Ilia Borok (RUS)	12
Fredrik Widgren (SWE)	6
Percy Kunsa (FRA)	15
Andreas Knebl (GER)	19

Final
Ilia Borok (RUS)	9
Andreas Knebl (GER)	1
Third place
Fredrik Widgren (SWE)	20
Percy Kunsa (FRA)	6
