= Nanoha Kida =

Japanese wushu practitioner (born 2000)

Personal information
- Born: March 31, 2000 (age 26)

Sport
- Sport: Wushu
- Events: Changquan, Jianshu, Qiangshu
Medal record
Representing Japan
Women's Wushu Taolu
World Games
Bronze medal – third place	2025 Chengdu	CQ All-around
World Cup
Gold medal – first place	2024 Yokohama	Changquan
Silver medal – second place	2026 Haikou	Jianshu
World Championships
Silver medal – second place	2025 Brasília	Jianshu
Asian Games
Silver medal – second place	2026 Aichi–Nagoya	Jianshu+Qiangshu
Asian Championships
Silver medal – second place	2024 Macau	Qiangshu
Bronze medal – third place	2024 Macau	Changquan
Asian Cup
Bronze medal – third place	2025 Songyuan	Qiangshu
World Junior Championships
Silver medal – second place	2016 Burgas	Qiangshu A
Bronze medal – third place	2016 Burgas	Jianshu A

Nanoha Kida (貴田菜ノ花, Kida Nanoha; March 31, 2000) is a Japanese professional wushu taolu athlete.

== Career ==
Kida made her international junior debut at the 2016 World Junior Wushu Championships where she won a silver medal in qiangshu and a bronze medal in jianshu,

Kida competed in the 2022 Asian Games (held in 2023) and finished eighth in women's jianshu and qiangshu combined. Several months later, she then won the silver medal in qiangshu and bronze medal in changquan at the 2024 Asian Wushu Championships. She then won the gold medal in changquan at the 2024 Taolu World Cup.

In July 2025, Kida won a bronze medal in qiangshu at the 2025 Taolu Asian Cup. At the 2025 World Games, she won the bronze medal in women's changquan, jianshu, and qiangshu all-around. At the 2025 World Wushu Championships, she won the silver medal in jianshu.
