= Carom at the 2025 World Games =

Carom game competition

- Venue: Qinglong Lake
- Dates: 10–14 August 2025
- No. of events: 2
- Competitors: 20 from 14 nations

The carom billiards competition at the 2025 World Games is scheduled to take place from 7 to 16 August 2025, in Chengdu in China, at the Qinglong Lake. The competition, which belongs to the cue sports discipline, added a female carom event to the male event that has been held since the 2001 games.

== Qualification ==
A total of 80 athletes qualified for the cue sports events. 12 men and 8 women qualified specifically for the carom events.

== Participating nations ==
- China (1)
- Colombia (2)
- Costa Rica (1)
- Denmark (1)
- Egypt (1)
- Germany (1)
- Japan (1)
- South Korea (2)
- Netherlands (4)
- Peru (1)
- Sweden (1)
- Turkey (2)
- United States (1)
- Vietnam (2)

== Medal table ==
* Host nation (China)

Rank	Nation	Gold	Silver	Bronze	Total
1	Netherlands	1	0	0	1
1	South Korea	1	0	0	1
3	Egypt	0	1	0	1
3	Japan	0	1	0	1
5	Germany	0	0	1	1
5	Peru	0	0	1	1
Totals (6 entries)		2	2	2	6

== Medalists ==
Event	Gold	Silver	Bronze
Men's 3-cushion	Cho Myung-woo; South Korea	Sameh Sidhom; Egypt	Martin Horn; Germany
Women's 3-cushion	Therese Klompenhouwer; Netherlands	Ayaka Miyashita; Japan	Jackeline Perez; Peru
