= Boules sports at the 2025 World Games =

- Venue: Chengdu Sport University Sancha Lake Campus
- Dates: 14–17 August 2025
- No. of events: 6
- Competitors: 38 from 14 nations

The boules sports competition at the 2025 World Games took place from 14 to 17 August 2025 at the Chengdu Sport University Sancha Lake Campus in Chengdu, China. The discipline had six events, three lyonnaise and three petanque.

== Qualification ==
A total of eight couples qualified for the lyonnaise and petanque events.

== Participating nations ==
- Argentina (2)
- Australia (2)
- Benin (2)
- China (2)
- Croatia (2)
- France (4)
- Italy (4)
- Madagascar (2)
- Slovenia (2)
- Spain (2)
- Turkey (2)
- Thailand (2)
- Tunisia (2)
- Vietnam (2)

== Medal table ==
* Host nation (China)

Rank	Nation	Gold	Silver	Bronze	Total
1	Tunisia	2	0	0	2
2	China*	1	2	0	3
3	Italy	1	1	1	3
4	France	1	0	2	3
5	Benin	1	0	0	1
6	Thailand	0	1	2	3
7	Slovenia	0	1	1	2
8	Turkey	0	1	0	1
Totals (8 entries)		6	6	6	18

== Medalists ==
=== Lyonnaise ===
Event	Gold	Silver	Bronze
Single Men – Progressive Shooting	Frédéric Marsens; France	Gasper Povh; Slovenia	Ivan Soligon; Italy
Single Women – Progressive Shooting	Wang Chenyi; China	İnci Ece Öztürk; Turkey	Jacqueline Košir; Slovenia
Quick Shooting	Italy (ITA); Ivan Soligon; Natalie Gamba	China (CHN); Zhang Xiaohui; Wang Chenyi	France (FRA); Frédéric Marsens; Lisa Gouilloud

=== Petanque ===
Event	Gold	Silver	Bronze
Single Men – Precision Shooting	Marcel Gbetable; Benin	Andréa Chiapello; Italy	Ratchata Khamdee; Thailand
Single Women – Precision Shooting	Mouna Beji Ep Matoussi; Tunisia	Yan Linlin; China	Nantawan Fueangsanit; Thailand
Classic Doubles	Tunisia (TUN); Mohamed Khaled Bougriba; Mouna Beji Ep Mattoussi	Thailand (THA); Ratchata Khamdee; Nantawan Fueangsanit	France (FRA); Lucas Desport; Sandrine Poinsot
