= Wushu at the 2025 World Games =

- Venue: Chengdu Hi-Tech Zone Sports Centre Gymnasium
- Dates: 8–12 August 2025
- No. of events: 12
- Competitors: 102 from 38 nations

The wushu competition at the 2025 World Games took place from 8 to 12 August 2025 at the Chengdu Hi-Tech Zone Sports Centre Gymnasium in Chengdu, China. The discipline included twelve events (six for men and six for women) in taolu and sanda.

== Qualification ==
A total of eight athletes qualified for each event. For the taolu events, six came from the 2023 World Wushu Championships, one quota was given at the 2024 World Game Series, and two were wildcards. Meanwhile for sanda, all qualified athletes came from the 2023 world championships.

== Medal table ==
* Host nation (China)

Rank	Nation	Gold	Silver	Bronze	Total
1	China*	5	1	0	6
2	Iran	2	1	1	4
3	Hong Kong	2	1	0	3
4	Malaysia	1	1	1	3
5	Egypt	1	0	1	2
6	South Korea	1	0	0	1
7	Vietnam	0	2	1	3
8	Singapore	0	1	3	4
9	Japan	0	1	1	2
10	Brunei	0	1	0	1
10	India	0	1	0	1
10	Indonesia	0	1	0	1
10	Uzbekistan	0	1	0	1
14	Chinese Taipei	0	0	2	2
15	Philippines	0	0	1	1
15	Spain	0	0	1	1
Totals (16 entries)		12	12	12	36

== Medalists ==
=== Taolu ===
==== Men ====
Event	Gold	Silver	Bronze
Changquan / Daoshu / Gunshu	Gao Jiushang; China	Seraf Naro Siregar; Indonesia	Jowen Lim; Singapore
Nanquan / Nangun	Shahin Banitalebi; Iran	Mohammad Adi Salihin; Brunei	Liu Chang-min; Chinese Taipei
Taijiquan / Taijijian	Yeung Chung Hei; Hong Kong	Tomohiro Araya; Japan	Yu Xuan Tay; Singapore

==== Women ====
Event	Gold	Silver	Bronze
Changquan / Jianshu / Qiangshu	Lydia Sham; Hong Kong	Pang Pui Yee; Malaysia	Nanoha Kida; Japan
Nanquan / Nandao	Tan Cheong Min; Malaysia	Darya Latisheva; Uzbekistan	Kassandra Ong; Singapore
Taijiquan / Taijijian	Lu Zhuoling; China	Zeanne Law; Singapore	Sydney Chin Sy Xuan; Malaysia

=== Sanda ===
==== Men ====
Event	Gold	Silver	Bronze
56 kg	Tang Sishuo; China	Đỗ Huy Hoàng; Vietnam	Carlos Baylon Jr. Philippines
70 kg	Song Gi-cheol; South Korea	Cheung Yat Lam; Hong Kong	Zhang Huan-yi; Chinese Taipei
85 kg	Alhussein Wahdan; Egypt	Mohammad Reza Rigi; Iran	André Fandiño; Spain

==== Women ====
Event	Gold	Silver	Bronze
52 kg	Chen Mengyue; China	Namrata Batra; India	Thị Phương Nga; Vietnam
60 kg	Li Zhiqin; China	Nguyễn Thị Thu Thuỷ; Vietnam	Soheila Mansourian; Iran
70 kg	Yasaman Bagherzadeh; Iran	Zhu Hailan; China	Menaalla Aly; Egypt

== Participating nations ==
- Azerbaijan (1)
- Belgium (1)
- Bermuda (1)
- Brazil (4)
- Brunei (4)
- Canada (2)
- China (6)
- Chinese Taipei (4)
- Colombia (1)
- Czech Republic (1)
- Egypt (2)
- France (2)
- Great Britain (1)
- Guinea (1)
- Hong Kong (5)
- India (3)
- Individual Neutral Athletes (2)
- Indonesia (4)
- Iran (5)
- Italy (3)
- Ivory Coast (1)
- Japan (5)
- Kazakhstan (1)
- Lebanon (2)
- Malaysia (4)
- Mexico (1)
- Philippines (4)
- Portugal (1)
- Singapore (6)
- South Korea (5)
- Spain (2)
- Sweden (1)
- Switzerland (3)
- Turkmenistan (1)
- Ukraine (2)
- United States (1)
- Uzbekistan (3)
- Vietnam (6)

== Results ==
=== Taolu ===
==== Men's changquan / daoshu / gunshu combined ====
The results were as follows:

Rank	Athlete	Nation	Changquan	Daoshu	Gunshu	Total
1st place, gold medalist(s)	Gao Jiushang	China	9.800	9.800	9.793	29.393
2nd place, silver medalist(s)	Seraf Naro Siregar	Indonesia	9.760	9.763	9.760	29.283
3rd place, bronze medalist(s)	Jowen Lim	Singapore	9.743	9.746	9.750	29.239
4	Zheng Zhou	United States	9.713	9.713	9.720	29.146
5	Clement Ting	Malaysia	9.436	9.746	9.633	28.815
6	Walid Lachkar	Brunei	9.576	9.346	9.666	28.588
7	Ong Zi Meng	Singapore	9.086	9.726	9.713	28.525
8	Park Geun-woo	South Korea	9.153	9.683	9.356	28.192
9	Loan Drouard	France	9.620	DNS	DNS	9.620

==== Men's nanquan / nangun combined ====
The results were as follows:

Rank	Athlete	Nation	Nanquan	Nangun	Total
1st place, gold medalist(s)	Shahin Banitalebi	Iran	9.710	9.756	19.465
2nd place, silver medalist(s)	Mohammad Adi Salihin	Brunei	9.716	9.740	19.456
3rd place, bronze medalist(s)	Liu Chang-min	Chinese Taipei	9.740	9.690	19.430
4	Akito Matsukawa	Japan	9.666	9.696	19.362
5	Sami Ben Mahmoud	Switzerland	9.646	9.693	19.339
6	Dario Stelluti	Italy	9.426	9.660	19.086
7	Donghae Yun	South Korea	9.053	9.376	18.429
8	Gabriel Komaziro	Brazil	8.790	9.306	18.096
9	Huu van Nong	Vietnam	8.926	9.056	17.982

==== Men's taijiquan / taijijian combined ====
The results were as follows:

Rank	Athlete	Nation	Taijiquan	Taijijian	Total
1st place, gold medalist(s)	Yeung Chung Hei	Hong Kong	9.766	9.760	19.526
2nd place, silver medalist(s)	Tomohiro Araya	Japan	9.710	9.766	19.476
3rd place, bronze medalist(s)	Yu Xuan Tay	Singapore	9.740	9.736	19.476
4	Sun Chia-hung	Chinese Taipei	9.763	9.710	19.473
5	Hosea Wong	Brunei	9.730	9.723	19.453
6	Ryo Murakami	Japan	9.676	9.690	19.366
7	Jones Llabres Inso	Philippines	9.706	9.406	19.112
8	Murray Cheung	Canada	9.373	9.310	18.683
9	Yu Won-hee	South Korea	8.733	DNS	8.733

==== Women's changquan / jianshu / qiangshu combined ====
The results were as follows:

Rank	Athlete	Nation	Changquan	Jianshu	Qiangshu	Total
1st place, gold medalist(s)	Lydia Sham	Hong Kong	9.750	9.760	9.750	29.260
2nd place, silver medalist(s)	Pang Pui Yee	Malaysia	9.730	9.726	9.733	29.189
3rd place, bronze medalist(s)	Nanoha Kida	Japan	9.730	9.650	9.736	29.116
4	Patricia Geraldine	Indonesia	9.726	9.533	9.736	28.995
5	Winnie Cai	Canada	9.150	9.696	9.706	28.552
6	Juliette Vauchez	France	9.240	9.513	9.710	28.463
7	Michele Silva Dos Santos	Brazil	9.346	9.440	9.340	28.126
8	Liu Huicong	Great Britain	9.070	9.380	9.530	27.980
9	Dương Thúy Vi	Vietnam	9.146	DNS	DNS	9.146

==== Women's nanquan / nandao combined ====
The results were as follows:

Rank	Athlete	Nation	Nanquan	Nandao	Total
1st place, gold medalist(s)	Tan Cheong Min	Malaysia	9.746	9.733	19.479
2nd place, silver medalist(s)	Darya Latisheva	Uzbekistan	9.720	9.713	19.433
3rd place, bronze medalist(s)	Kassandra Ong	Singapore	9.700	9.686	19.386
4	Tasya Ayu Puspa Dewi	Indonesia	9.723	9.653	19.376
5	Helia Asadian	Iran	9.690	9.653	19.343
6	Đặng Trần Phương Nhi	Vietnam	9.720	9.613	19.333
7	Lara Cossa	Italy	9.523	9.620	19.143
8	Silvia Cruz	Portugal	9.543	9.443	18.986
9	Tsang Cho Kiu	Hong Kong	8.786	8.783	17.569

==== Women's taijiquan / taijijian combined ====
The results were as follows:

Rank	Athlete	Nation	Taijiquan	Taijijian	Total
1st place, gold medalist(s)	Lu Zhuoling	China	9.796	9.726	19.522
2nd place, silver medalist(s)	Zeanne Law	Singapore	9.740	9.690	19.430
3rd place, bronze medalist(s)	Sydney Chin Sy Xuan	Malaysia	9.680	9.730	19.410
4	Basma Lachkar	Brunei	9.720	9.673	19.393
5	Shito Saito	Japan	9.626	9.750	19.376
6	Pei Hsun Liu	Chinese Taipei	9.393	9.663	19.056
7	Agatha Wong	Philippines	9.160	9.703	18.866
8	Vera Tan	Singapore	8.890	9.703	18.593
9	Oryna Ivanova	Ukraine	9.690	8.883	18.573
