= Tunisia at the 2025 World Games =

- IOC code: TUN
- NOC: Tunisian Olympic Committee

in Chengdu, China 7 August 2025 – 17 August 2025
- Competitors: 15 (12 men and 3 women) in 5 sports and 7 events
- Medals Ranked 34th: Gold 2 Silver 0 Bronze 0 Total 2

World Games appearances
- 1981; 1985; 1989; 1993; 1997; 2001; 2005; 2009; 2013; 2017; 2022; 2025

Tunisia competed at the 2025 World Games held in Chengdu, China from 7 to 17 August 2025.

Athletes representing Tunisia won two gold medals, which is their first ever World Games gold medal. The country finished in 34th place in the medal table.

== Medalists ==
| Medal | Name | Sport | Event | Date |
|---|---|---|---|---|
| Gold | Mouna Mattoussi | Boules sports | Women's petanque precision shooting | 16 August |
| Gold | Khalid Bougriba; Mouna Mattoussi | Boules sports | Mixed petanque classic doubles | 17 August |

== Competitors ==
The following is the list of number of competitors in the Games.

| Sport | Men | Women | Total |
|---|---|---|---|
| Boules sports | 1 | 1 | 2 |
| Handball | 10 | 0 | 10 |
| Karate | 0 | 1 | 1 |
| Powerlifting | 1 | 0 | 1 |
| Wushu | 0 | 1 | 1 |
| Total | 12 | 3 | 15 |

== Beach handball ==
| Team | Event | Preliminary round | | | | Quarterfinal | Semifinal | Final / BM / PM | |
| Team | Event | Opposition Result | Opposition Result | Opposition Result | Rank | Opposition Result | Opposition Result | Opposition Result | Rank |
|---|---|---|---|---|---|---|---|---|---|
| Tunisia men's | Men's tournament | China; W 0–2 | Denmark; L 0–2 | Spain; L 2–0 | 3 | Portugal; L 2–1 | Consolidation semifinal Croatia; L 2–0 | 7th place game China; W 2–1 | 7 |

== Powerlifting ==
Classic

| Athlete | Event | Exercises | | | Total weight | Total points | Rank |
| Athlete | Event | Squat | Bench press | Deadlift | Total weight | Total points | Rank |
|---|---|---|---|---|---|---|---|
| Fares Sboui | Men's heavyweight | 325.0 | 210.0 | 335.0 | 870.0 | 108.90 | 5 |
