= Iran at the 2025 World Games =

- IOC code: IRI
- NOC: National Olympic Committee of the Islamic Republic of Iran

in Chengdu, China 7 August 2025 – 17 August 2025
- Competitors: 29 (9 men and 20 women) in 9 sports and 17 events
- Medals Ranked 30th: Gold 3 Silver 1 Bronze 3 Total 7

World Games appearances (overview)
- 1981; 1985; 1989; 1993; 1997; 2001; 2005; 2009; 2013; 2017; 2022; 2025

Iran competed at the 2025 World Games held in Chengdu, China from 7 to 17 August 2025.

Athletes representing Iran won three gold medals, one silver medal and three bronze medals. The country finished in 30th place in the medal table.

== Medalists ==
Medal	Name	Sport	Event	Date
Gold	Shahin Banitalebi	Wushu	Men's nanquan / nangun combined	8 August
Gold	Sara Bahmanyar	Karate	Women's kumite 50 kg	8 August
Gold	Yasaman Bagherzadeh	Wushu	Women's 70 kg	12 August
Silver	Mohammed Reza Rigi	Wushu	Men's 85 kg	12 August
Bronze	Saleh Abazari	Karate	Men's kumite +84 kg	9 August
Bronze	Soheila Mansourian	Wushu	Women's 60 kg	12 August
Bronze	Reza Lesani	Freestyle inline skating	Men's speed slalom	16 August

== Competitors ==
The following is the list of number of competitors in the Games.

Sport	Men	Women	Total
Archery	0	1	1
Snooker	1	0	1
Canoe polo	0	8	8
Karate	1	3	4
Kickboxing	0	1	1
Freestyle inline skating	2	2	4
Triathlon	3	3	6
Wushu	2	3	5
Total	9	21	30

== Archery ==
Compound

Athlete	Event	Qualification		Elimination 1	Elimination 2	Elimination 3	Elimination 4	Semifinal	Final / BM	
Athlete	Event	Score	Rank	Opposition Result	Opposition Result	Opposition Result	Opposition Result	Opposition Result	Opposition Result	Rank
Geesa Bybordy	Women's compound	685	19	Marcussen (DEN); W 145–142	Dhamangaonkar (IND); L 136–141	Did not advance				

== Kickboxing ==
Athlete	Event	Quarterfinals	Semifinal	Final/BM	Rank
Athlete	Event	Opposition Result	Opposition Result	Opposition Result	Rank
Negin Iranmanesh	Women's Point -70 kg	Baloh (SLO); L -1–10	Did not advance		

== Roller sports ==
Men

Athlete	Event	Qualification				Quarterfinal	Semifinal	Final / BM	
Athlete	Event	Run 1	Run 2	Result	Rank	Opposition Result	Opposition Result	Opposition Result	Rank
Reza Lesani	Freestyle inline skating Men's Speed Slalom	4.105	4.083	4.083	5	Rujirek (THA); W 2–1	Zhang (CHN); L 1–2	Savari Jamalouei (IRI); W 2–0	3rd place, bronze medalist(s)
Amirmohammad Savari Jamalouei	Freestyle inline skating Men's Speed Slalom	4.188	4.176	4.176	6	Yang (TPE); W 2–1	Fu (CHN); L 0–2	Lesani (IRI); L 0–2	4

Women

Athlete	Event	Qualification				Quarterfinal	Semifinal	Final / BM	
Athlete	Event	Run 1	Run 2	Result	Rank	Opposition Result	Opposition Result	Opposition Result	Rank
Romina Salek Esfahani	Freestyle inline skating Women's Speed Slalom	4.340	DQ	4.340	4	Ahmadi (IRI); W 2–0	Liu (TPE); L 0–2	Wen (CHN); L 1–2	4
Taraneh Ahmadi	Freestyle inline skating Women's Speed Slalom	4.716	4.388	4.388	5	Salek Esfahani (IRI); L 0–2	Did not advance		

== Snooker ==
Snooker

Athlete	Event	Preliminary Round		Semifinals	Final / BM / PF	
Athlete	Event	Opposition Result	Opposition Result	Opposition Result	Opposition Result	Rank
Ali Gharahgozlou	Men's 15-reds	Xiao (CHN); L 0–2	Milewski (POL); L 0–2	Did not advance		

== Wushu ==
=== Sanda ===
Men

Athlete	Event	Quarter-finals	Semi-finals	Finals	Rank
Athlete	Event	Opponent score	Opponent score	Opponent score	Rank
Mohammadreza Rigi	Men's sanda 85 kg	Armero (COL); W WPD	Fandiño (ESP); W WKO	Wahdan (EGY); L 1–2	2nd place, silver medalist(s)

Women

Athlete	Event	Quarter-finals	Semi-finals	Finals	Rank
Athlete	Event	Opponent score	Opponent score	Opponent score	Rank
Soheila Mansourian	Women's sanda 60 kg	Schumacher (SUI); W WPD	Li (CHN); L 0–2	Bronze medal match Chan (HKG); W 2–0	3rd place, bronze medalist(s)
Yasaman Bagherzadeh	Women's sanda 70 kg	Martins (BRA); W WPD	Dyer (BER); W WPD	Zhu (CHN); W 2–1	1st place, gold medalist(s)

=== Taolu ===
Athlete	Event	Apparatus 1	Apparatus 2	Total	Rank
Shahin Banitalebi	Men's nanquan / nangun	Nanquan; 9.710	Nangun; 9.756	19.466	1st place, gold medalist(s)
Helia Asadian	Women's nanquan / nandao	nanquan 9.690	nandao 9.653	19.343	5
