= Saudi Arabia at the 2025 World Games =

- IOC code: KSA
- NOC: Saudi Arabian Olympic Committee

in Chengdu, China 7 August 2025 – 17 August 2025
- Competitors: 4 (3 men and 1 woman) in 4 sports and 5 events
- Medals Ranked 77th: Gold 0 Silver 0 Bronze 1 Total 1

World Games appearances
- 1981; 1985; 1989; 1993; 1997; 2001; 2005; 2009; 2013; 2017; 2022; 2025

Saudi Arabia competed at the 2025 World Games held in Chengdu, China from 7 to 17 August 2025.

Athletes representing Saudi Arabia won one bronze medal and the country finished in 77th place in the medal table.

== Medalist ==
Medal	Name	Sport	Event	Date
Bronze	Abdullah Nada	Ju-jitsu	Men's Ne-Waza 85 kg	11 August

== Competitors ==
The following is the list of number of competitors in the Games.

Sport	Men	Women	Total
Ju-jitsu	1	0	1
Karate	1	0	1
Muaythai	0	1	1
Triathlon	1	0	1
Total	3	1	4
