= Singapore at the 2025 World Games =

- IOC code: SGP
- NOC: Singapore National Olympic Council

in Chengdu, China 7 August 2025 – 17 August 2025
- Competitors: 43 (20 men and 23 women) in 8 sports and 12 events
- Medals Ranked 63rd: Gold 0 Silver 1 Bronze 3 Total 4

World Games appearances
- 1981; 1985; 1989; 1993; 1997; 2001; 2005; 2009; 2013; 2017; 2022; 2025

Singapore competed at the 2025 World Games held in Chengdu, China from 7 to 17 August 2025.

Athletes representing Singapore won one silver medal and three bronze medals. The country finished in 63rd place in the medal table.

== Medalists ==
Medal	Name	Sport	Event	Date
Silver	Zeanne Law	Wushu	Women's taijiquan / taijijian combined	8 August
Bronze	Ong Kassandra	Wushu	Women's nanquan / nandao combined	9 August
Bronze	Yu Xuan Tay	Wushu	Men's taijiquan / taijijian combined	9 August
Bronze	Jowen Lim	Wushu	Men's changquan / daoshu / gunshu combined	9 August

== Competitors ==
The following is the list of number of competitors in the Games.

Sport	Men	Women	Total
Baseball	15	0	15
Billards	1	0	1
Floorball	0	14	14
Muaythai	0	1	1
Powerlifting	0	1	1
Triathlon	0	3	3
Underwater sports	1	1	2
Wushu	3	3	6
Total	20	23	43

== Baseball ==
Men

Team	Event	Group play				Semifinal	Final / BM	
Team	Event	Opposition Result	Opposition Result	Opposition Result	Rank	Opposition Result	Opposition Result	Rank
Singapore men	Men's tournament							

== Floorball ==
Summary

Team	Event	Preliminary round				Semifinal	Final / BM / PF	
Team	Event	Opposition Result	Opposition Result	Opposition Result	Rank	Opposition Result	Opposition Result	Rank
Singapore women	Women's tournament	Czech Republic; L 21–0	Finland; L 0–20	Canada; W 1–14	3	—	Slovakia; L 13–2	6

== Powerlifting ==
Classic

Athlete	Event	Exercises			Total weight	Total points	Rank
Athlete	Event	Squat	Bench press	Deadlift	Total weight	Total points	Rank
Clinton Lee	Men's Middleweight	270.0	170.0	305.0	745.0	108.56	4
