= Mauritius at the 2025 World Games =

- IOC code: MRI
- NOC: Mauritius Olympic Committee

in Chengdu, China 7 August 2025 – 17 August 2025
- Competitors: 1 (1 man and 0 women) in 1 sport and 1 event

World Games appearances
- 1981; 1985; 1989; 1993; 1997; 2001; 2005; 2009; 2013; 2017; 2022; 2025

Mauritius will compete at the 2025 World Games held in Chengdu, China from 7 to 17 August 2025.

== Competitors ==
The following is the list of number of competitors in the Games.

Sport	Men	Women	Total
Ju-jitsu	1	0	1
Total	1	0	1
