= Puerto Rico at the 2025 World Games =

- IOC code: PRI
- NOC: Puerto Rico Olympic Committee

in Chengdu, China 7 August 2025 – 17 August 2025
- Competitors: 17 (1 man and 16 women) in 3 sports and 3 events
- Medals: Gold 0 Silver 0 Bronze 0 Total 0

World Games appearances
- 1981; 1985; 1989; 1993; 1997; 2001; 2005; 2009; 2013; 2017; 2022; 2025

Puerto Rico competed at the 2025 World Games held in Chengdu, China from 7 to 17 August 2025.

== Competitors ==
The following is the list of number of competitors in the Games.

Sport	Men	Women	Total
Archery	1	0	1
Softball	0	15	15
Powerlifting	0	1	1
Total	1	16	17

== Archery ==
One Malaysian male archer qualified for the men's individual compound event.

Athlete	Event	Ranking round		Round of 32	Round of 16	Quarterfinals	Semifinals	Final / BM	
Athlete	Event	Score	Seed	Opposition Score	Opposition Score	Opposition Score	Opposition Score	Opposition Score	Rank
Jean Pizarro	Men's compound	N/A	N/A	Septimus Cilliers (RSA); W 146–144	Abhishek Verma (IND); L 143–149	Did not advance			

== Powerlifting ==
Equipped

Athlete	Event	Exercises			Total weight	Total points	Rank
Athlete	Event	Squat	Bench press	Deadlift	Total weight	Total points	Rank
Frankmary Duno	Women's Lightweight	DSQ					

== Softball ==
Women

Team	Event	Group play				Semifinal	Final / BM	
Team	Event	Opposition Result	Opposition Result	Opposition Result	Rank	Opposition Result	Opposition Result	Rank
Puerto Rico women	Women's tournament	Canada; L 11–9	Japan; L 0–7	Australia; L 9–1	4	Netherlands; W 3–1	Australia; Cancelled	5
