= Mauritius at the 2017 World Games =

Mauritius at the World Games 2017
- IOC code: MRI

in Wrocław, Poland 20 July 2017 – 30 July 2017
- Competitors: 1 in 1 sport
- Medals: Gold 0 Silver 0 Bronze 0 Total 0

World Games appearances
- 1981; 1985; 1989; 1993; 1997; 2001; 2005; 2009; 2013; 2017; 2022; 2025

Mauritius competed at the 2017 World Games in Wrocław, Poland, from 20 July 2017 to 30 July 2017.

== Competitors ==
Sports	Men	Women	Total	Events
Kickboxing	1	0	1	1
Total	1	0	1	1

Kickboxing

Mauritius has qualified at the 2017 World Games

Men's -81 kg -
