= Vietnam at the 2025 World Games =

- IOC code: VIE
- NOC: Vietnam Olympic Committee

in Chengdu, China 7 August 2025 – 17 August 2025
- Competitors: 26 (9 men and 17 women) in 7 sports
- Medals Ranked 62nd: Gold 0 Silver 2 Bronze 1 Total 3

World Games appearances
- 1981; 1985; 1989; 1993; 1997; 2001; 2005; 2009; 2013; 2017; 2022; 2025

Vietnam competed at the 2025 World Games held in Chengdu, China from 7 to 17 August 2025.

Athletes representing Vietnam won two silver medals and one bronze medal. The country finished in 62nd place in the medal table.

== Medalists ==
Medal	Name	Sport	Event	Date
Silver	Đỗ Huy Hoàng	Wushu	Men's 56 kg	12 August
Silver	Nguyễn Thị Thu Thuỷ	Wushu	Women's 60 kg	12 August
Bronze	Thị Phương Nga	Wushu	Women's 52 kg	12 August

== Competitors ==
The following is the list of number of competitors in the Games.

Sport	Men	Women	Total
Aerobic gymnastics	4	1	5
Beach handball	0	10	10
Billiards sports	1	1	2
Boules sports	1	1	2
Kickboxing	0	1	1
Muaythai	1	0	1
Wushu	3	4	7
Total	10	18	28

== Aerobic gymnastics ==
Vietnam qualified athlete at the 2024 Aerobic Gymnastics World Championships.

Athlete	Event	Qualification		Final	
Athlete	Event	Result	Rank	Result	Rank
Hoang Gia Bao; Nguyen Che Thanh; Phan Thi Uyen Nhi	Trio	18.855	3 Q	16.663	4

== Beach handball ==
Vietnam qualified at the 2024 Women's Beach Handball World Championships from China.

Team	Event	Preliminary round				Quarterfinals	Semifinals/ Consolation Semifinal 5-8	Final / BM / PM	
Team	Event	Opposition Result	Opposition Result	Opposition Result	Rank	Opposition Result	Opposition Result	Opposition Result	Rank
Vietnam women's	Women's tournament	Denmark; L 0–2	Germany; L 0-2	Spain; L 1-2	4 Q	Argentina; L 0-2	Portugal; L 1-2	Croatia; L 1-2	8

== Billiards sports ==
Vietnam qualified two athlete to compete at the games.

Athletic	Event	Preliminary round				Quarterfinals	Semifinals	Final / BM	
Athletic	Event	Opposition Result	Opposition Result	Opposition Result	Rank	Opposition Result	Opposition Result	Opposition Result	Rank
Trần Quyết Chiến	Men's 3-cushion carom	Bury (FRA); D 40-40	Martinez (COL); W 40-38	—N/a	1 Q	Bury (FRA); W 40-32	Cho (KOR); L 39-40	Horn (GER); L 34-40	4
Phùng Kiện Tường	Women's 3-cushion carom	Sorensen (DEN); L 20-25	Perez (PER); L 23-25	Lalinde (COL); W 25-17	4	—N/a	Did not advance		

== Boules Sports ==
Pétanque precision shooting

Athlete	Event	Qualification		Semifinals	Final / BM	
Athlete	Event	Result	Rank	Opposition Result	Opposition Result	Rank
Võ Minh Luân	Men's precision shooting					
Kim Thị Thu Thảo	Women's precision shooting					

Pétanque classic

Athlete	Event	Group matches			Semifinals	Final / BM	
Athlete	Event	Opposition Result	Opposition Result	Rank	Opposition Result	Opposition Result	Rank
Võ Minh Luân; Kim Thị Thu Thảo	Mixed doubles						

== Kickboxing ==
Vietnam competed in kickboxing qualified for the World Games through the 2024 Asian Kickboxing Championships.

Athlete	Event	Quarterfinal	Semifinal	Final / BM	
Athlete	Event	Opposition Result	Opposition Result	Opposition Result	Rank
Triệu Thị Phương Thuỳ	Women's –52 kg	Feyzanur (TUR); L 0-3	Did not advance		

== Muaythai ==
Vietnam competed in muaythai at 2025 World Games in Chengdu, China.

Athlete	Event	Quarterfinal	Semifinal	Final / BM	
Athlete	Event	Opposition Result	Opposition Result	Opposition Result	Rank
Nguyễn Trần Duy Nhất	Men's –57 kg	Yang (CHN); W 30-27	Shelesko (UKR); L 28-29	Daren (FRA); L 27-30	4

== Wushu ==
Vietnam qualified four athlete at the 2023 World Wushu Championships.

Sanda

Athlete	Event	Quarterfinal	Semifinal	Final / BM	
Athlete	Event	Opposition Result	Opposition Result	Opposition Result	Rank
Đỗ Huy Hoàng	Men's sanda 56 kg	Bye	Karimov (KAZ); W 2-0	Tang (CHN); L WPD	2nd place, silver medalist(s)
Ngô Thị Phương Nga	Women's sanda 52 kg	Bye	Chen (CHN); L 0-2	Collado (PHI); W WPD	3rd place, bronze medalist(s)
Nguyễn Thị Thu Thuỷ	Women's sanda 60 kg	Kriukova (AIN); W WPD	Chan (HKG); W 2-0	Li (CHN); L 0-2	2nd place, silver medalist(s)

Taolu

Athlete	Event	First routine		Second routine		Third routine		Final score	
Athlete	Event	Result	Rank	Result	Rank	Result	Rank	Result	Rank
Nông Văn Hữu	Men's nanquan and nangun	8.926	8	9.056	9	—N/a		17.982	9
Dương Thúy Vi	Women's changquan & jianshu and qiangshu	9.146	8	DNS				9.146	9
Đặng Trần Phương Nhi	Women's nanquan and nandao	9.720	3	9.613	4	—N/a		19.343	6
