= Jamaica at the 2025 World Games =

- IOC code: JAM
- NOC: Jamaica Olympic Association

in Chengdu, China 7 August 2025 – 17 August 2025
- Competitors: 2 (1 man and 1 woman) in 2 sports and 2 events

World Games appearances
- 1981; 1985; 1989; 1993; 1997; 2001; 2005; 2009; 2013; 2017; 2022; 2025

Jamaica will compete at the 2025 World Games held in Chengdu, China from 7 to 17 August 2025.

== Competitors ==
The following is the list of number of competitors in the Games.

Sport	Men	Women	Total
Powerlifting	0	1	1
Sambo	1	0	1
Total	1	1	2

== Powerlifting ==
Classic

Athlete	Event	Exercises			Total weight	Total points	Rank
Athlete	Event	Squat	Bench press	Deadlift	Total weight	Total points	Rank
Sami Depass	Women's heavyweight						

== Sambo ==
Men

Athlete	Event	Quarterfinals	Semi-finals	Final/Bronze medal bout	
Athlete	Event	Opposition Result	Opposition Result	Opposition Result	Rank
Matthew Colquhoun	88 kg	Abusupiyan Alikhanov (AIN); L 0–3	Did not advance		
