= Virgin Islands at the 2025 World Games =

- IOC code: ISV

in Chengdu, China August 7 – 17, 2025
- Competitors: 1 in 1 sport
- Medals Ranked 49th: Gold 1 Silver 0 Bronze 0 Total 1

World Games appearances
- 1981; 1985; 1989; 1993; 1997; 2001; 2005; 2009; 2013; 2017; 2022; 2025

Virgin Islands competed at the 2025 World Games held in Chengdu, China from 7 to 17 August 2025.

Virgin Islands is only represented by one athlete, and he won one gold medal. The country finished in 51st place in the medal table.

== Medalists ==
Medal	Name	Sport	Event	Date
Gold	Joseph Jordan	Powerlifting	Men's lightweight	14 August

== Competitors ==
The following is the list of number of competitors in the Games.

Sport	Men	Women	Total
Powerlifting	1	0	1
Total	1	0	1

== Powerlifting ==
Classic

Athlete	Event	Exercises			Total weight	Total points	Rank
Athlete	Event	Squat	Bench press	Deadlift	Total weight	Total points	Rank
Joseph Jordan	Men's lightweight	260.0	170.0	290.0	720.0	112.46	1st place, gold medalist(s)
