= Nauru at the 2025 World Games =

- IOC code: NRU
- NOC: Nauru Olympic Committee

in Chengdu, China 7 August 2025 – 17 August 2025
- Competitors: 1 (0 men and 1 woman) in 1 sport and 1 event

World Games appearances
- 1981; 1985; 1989; 1993; 1997; 2001; 2005; 2009; 2013; 2017; 2022; 2025

Nauru will compete at the 2025 World Games held in Chengdu, China from 7 to 17 August 2025.

== Competitors ==
The following is the list of number of competitors in the Games.

Sport	Men	Women	Total
Powerlifting	0	1	1
Total	0	1	1

== Powerlifting ==
Classic

Athlete	Event	Exercises			Total weight	Total points	Rank
Athlete	Event	Squat	Bench press	Deadlift	Total weight	Total points	Rank
Bessie O'Brien	Women's Super heavyweight	290.0	112.5	210.0	612.5	104.68	6
