= Armenia at the 2025 World Games =

- IOC code: ARM
- NOC: Armenian Olympic Committee

in Chengdu, China 7 August 2025 – 17 August 2025
- Competitors: 6 (4 men and 2 women) in 2 sports and 6 events
- Medals Ranked 51st: Gold 1 Silver 0 Bronze 0 Total 1

World Games appearances
- 1981; 1985; 1989; 1993; 1997; 2001; 2005; 2009; 2013; 2017; 2022; 2025

Armenia competed at the 2025 World Games held in Chengdu, China from 7 to 17 August 2025.

Armenian sambist, Arman Avanesyan won the nation's first World Games medal in history. He won a gold medal in sambo. The country finished in 51st place in the medal table.

== Medalist ==
Medal	Name	Sport	Event	Date
Gold	Arman Avanesyan	Sambo	Men's combat 98 kg	14 August

== Competitors ==
The following is the list of number of competitors in the Games.

Sport	Men	Women	Total
Muaythai	1	0	1
Sambo	3	2	5
Total	4	2	6
