= Wushu at the 2024 World Games Series =

Wushu (Taolu) at the 2024 World Games Series
- Venue: Sports Centre Sai Sha (Site C) (capacity: 600)
- Dates: 12–13 October 2024

The wushu (taolu) competition at the 2024 World Games Series was held from 12 to 13 October 2024, at the Sports Centre Sai Sha (Site C) in Hong Kong, China. This competition served as partial qualification for the wushu event at the 2025 World Games.

== Results ==
=== Medal table ===
* Host nation (Hong Kong)

Rank	Nation	Gold	Silver	Bronze	Total
1	Hong Kong (HKG)*	3	0	2	5
2	Singapore (SGP)	1	1	1	3
3	Iran (IRI)	1	1	0	2
4	Brunei (BRU)	1	0	0	1
5	Indonesia (INA)	0	2	1	3
6	Malaysia (MAS)	0	1	0	1
6	Uzbekistan (UZB)	0	1	0	1
8	Philippines (PHI)	0	0	1	1
8	Thailand (THA)	0	0	1	1
Totals (9 entries)		6	6	6	18

=== Medalists ===
==== Men ====
Event	Gold	Silver	Bronze
Changquan / Daoshu / Gunshu	Chia Kai Ming; Singapore	Ong Zi Meng; Singapore	Weerachat Koolsawatmongkol; Thailand
Nanquan / Nangun	Shahin Banitalebi; Iran	Mostafa Hassanzadeh; Iran	Kin Sing Kinson Ting; Hong Kong
Taijiquan / Taijijian	Yeung Chung Hei; Hong Kong	Tan Zi Yan; Malaysia	Jones Llabres Inso; Philippines

==== Women ====
Event	Gold	Silver	Bronze
Changquan / Jianshu / Qiangshu	Lydia Sham; Hong Kong	Patricia Geraldine; Indonesia	Le Yin Shuen; Singapore
Nanquan / Nandao	Po Yan Lau; Hong Kong	Darya Latisheva; Uzbekistan	Alinskha Hanamaria; Indonesia
Taijiquan / Taijijian	Basma Lachkar; Brunei	SaIwaa Dhana Azalia; Indonesia	Juanita Mok; Hong Kong
