= Mongolia at the 2025 World Games =

- IOC code: MGL
- NOC: Mongolian National Olympic Committee

in Chengdu, China 7 August 2025 – 17 August 2025
- Competitors: 9 (4 men and 5 women) in 5 sports and 11 events
- Medals Ranked 57th: Gold 0 Silver 3 Bronze 0 Total 3

World Games appearances
- 1981; 1985; 1989; 1993; 1997; 2001; 2005; 2009; 2013; 2017; 2022; 2025

Mongolia competed at the 2025 World Games held in Chengdu, China from 7 to 17 August 2025.

Athletes representing Mongolia won three silver medals and the country finished in 57th place in the medal table.

== Medalists ==
| Medal | Name | Sport | Event | Date |
|---|---|---|---|---|
| Silver | Lkhaasürengiin Olonbayar; Ganganmöröngiin Ölziibat | Ju-jitsu | Mixed duo para mental | 12 August |
| Silver | Enkhbaataryn Nomintuyaa | Sambo | Women's combat 59 kg | 13 August |
| Silver | Uran-Ölziin Anujin | Sambo | Women's combat 72 kg | 13 August |

== Competitors ==
The following is the list of number of competitors in the Games.

| Sport | Men | Women | Total |
|---|---|---|---|
| Billards | 0 | 1 | 1 |
| Ju-jitsu | 2 | 2 | 4 |
| Sambo | 0 | 2 | 2 |
| Powerlifting | 1 | 0 | 1 |
| Triathlon | 1 | 0 | 1 |
| Total | 4 | 5 | 9 |
