= Brunei at the 2025 World Games =

- IOC code: BRU
- NOC: Brunei Darussalam National Olympic Council

in Chengdu, China 7 August 2025 – 17 August 2025
- Competitors: 4 (3 men and 1 woman) in 1 sport and 4 events
- Medals Ranked 71st: Gold 0 Silver 1 Bronze 0 Total 1

World Games appearances
- 1981; 1985; 1989; 1993; 1997; 2001; 2005; 2009; 2013; 2017; 2022; 2025

Brunei competed at the 2025 World Games held in Chengdu, China from 7 to 17 August 2025.

Athletes representing Brunei won one silver medal and the country finished in 71st place in the medal table.

== Medalists ==
Medal	Name	Sport	Event	Date
Silver	Mohammad Adi Salihin	Wushu	Men's Nanquan/Nangun	8 August

== Competitors ==
The following is the list of number of competitors in the Games.

Sport	Men	Women	Total
Wushu	3	1	4
Total	3	1	4

== Wushu ==
Brunei is solely competing in Wushu.

Athlete	Event	First routine	Second routine	Third routine	Total	Rank
Walid Lachkar	Men's changquan / daoshu / gunshu	Changquan; 9.576	Daoshu; 9.346	Gunshu; 9.666	28.588	6
Mohammad Adi Salihin	Men's nanquan / nangun	Nanquan; 9.716	Nangun; 9.740	—	19.456	2nd place, silver medalist(s)
Hosea Wong	Men's taijiquan / taijijian	Taijiquan; 9.730	Taijijian; 9.723	—	19.453	5
Basma Lachkar	Women's taijiquan / taijijian	Taijiquan; 9.720	Taijijian; 9.673	—	19.393	4
