= Lebanon at the 2025 World Games =

- IOC code: LBN
- NOC: Lebanese Olympic Committee

in Chengdu, China 7 August 2025 – 17 August 2025
- Competitors: 3 (2 men and 1 woman) in 2 sports and 3 events
- Medals Ranked 71st: Gold 0 Silver 1 Bronze 0 Total 1

World Games appearances
- 1981; 1985; 1989; 1993; 1997; 2001; 2005; 2009; 2013; 2017; 2022; 2025

Lebanon competed at the 2025 World Games held in Chengdu, China from 7 to 17 August 2025.

Powerlifter Etienne El Chaer won the first ever World Games medal for the country, which is one silver medal. The country finished in 71st place in the medal table.

== Medalist ==
Medal	Name	Sport	Event	Date
Silver	Etienne El Chaer	Powerlifitng	Men's super heavyweight	15 August

== Competitors ==
The following is the list of number of competitors in the Games.

Sport	Men	Women	Total
Powerlifting	1	0	1
Wushu	1	1	2
Total	2	1	3

== Powerlifting ==
Classic

Athlete	Event	Exercises			Total weight	Total points	Rank
Athlete	Event	Squat	Bench press	Deadlift	Total weight	Total points	Rank
Etienne El Chaer	Men's Super heavyweight	330.0	235.0	385.0	950.0	110.07	2nd place, silver medalist(s)
