= Greece at the 2025 World Games =

- IOC code: GRE
- NOC: Hellenic Olympic Committee

in Chengdu, China 7 August 2025 – 17 August 2025
- Competitors: 15 (10 men and 5 women) in 5 sports and 14 events
- Medals Ranked 47th: Gold 1 Silver 0 Bronze 2 Total 3

World Games appearances (overview)
- 1981; 1985; 1989; 1993; 1997; 2001; 2005; 2009; 2013; 2017; 2022; 2025

Greece competed at the 2025 World Games held in Chengdu, China from 7 to 17 August 2025.

Athletes representing Greece won one gold medal and two bronze medals. The country finished in 47th place in the medal table.

== Medalists ==
Medal	Name	Sport	Event	Date
Gold	Dimitrios Economo	Kickboxing	Men's point fighting 84 kg	14 August
Bronze	Christos-Stefanos Xenos	Karate	Men's kumite 60 kg	8 August
Bronze	Alexandra Efraimoglou	Trampoline gymnastics	Women's tumbling	9 August

== Competitors ==
The following is the list of number of competitors in the Games.

Sport	Men	Women	Total
Finswimming	4	3	7
Gymnastics	0	1	1
Ju-jitsu	2	1	3
Karate	2	0	2
Kickboxing	2	0	2
Total	10	5	15
