= Kyrgyzstan at the 2025 World Games =

- IOC code: KGZ
- NOC: National Olympic Committee of the Kyrgyz Republic

in Chengdu, China 7 August 2025 – 17 August 2025
- Competitors: 6 (5 men and 1 woman) in 2 sports and 7 events
- Medals Ranked 75th: Gold 0 Silver 0 Bronze 3 Total 3

World Games appearances
- 1981; 1985; 1989; 1993; 1997; 2001; 2005; 2009; 2013; 2017; 2022; 2025

Kyrgyzstan competed at the 2025 World Games held in Chengdu, China from 7 to 17 August 2025.

Athletes representing Kyrgyzstan won three bronze medals and the country finished in 75th place in the medal table

== Medalists ==
Medal	Name	Sport	Event	Date
Bronze	Kurmanbek Zamirbek Uulu	Sambo	Men's 71 kg	13 August
Bronze	Bekten Erkebai Uulu	Sambo	Men's 88 kg	13 August
Bronze	Akak Uson Kyzy	Sambo	Women's 54 kg	14 August

== Competitors ==
The following is the list of number of competitors in the Games.

Sport	Men	Women	Total
Sambo	4	1	5
Wakeboarding	1	0	1
Total	5	1	6
