= Malaysia at the 2025 World Games =

- IOC code: MAS
- NOC: Olympic Council of Malaysia

in Chengdu, China 7 August 2025 – 17 August 2025
- Competitors: 5 (2 men and 3 women) in 2 sports and 5 events
- Medals Ranked 45th: Gold 1 Silver 1 Bronze 1 Total 3

World Games appearances (overview)
- 1981; 1985; 1989; 1993; 1997; 2001; 2005; 2009; 2013; 2017; 2022; 2025

Malaysia competed at the 2025 World Games held in Chengdu, China from 7 to 17 August 2025.

Athletes representing Malaysia won one gold medal, one silver medal and one bronze medal. The country finished in 45th place in the medal table.

== Competitors ==
The following is the list of number of competitors in the Games.

Sport	Men	Women	Total
Archery	1	0	1
Wushu	1	3	4
Total	2	3	5

== Medalists ==
Medal	Name	Sport	Event	Date
Gold	Tan Cheong Min	Wushu	Women's nanquan / nandao combined	9 August
Silver	Pang Pui Yee	Wushu	Women's chanquan/jianshu/qiangshu combined	9 August
Bronze	Sydney Chin Sy Xuan	Wushu	Women's taijiquan / taijijian combined	8 August

== Archery ==
One Malaysian male archer qualified for the men's individual compound event.

Athlete	Event	Ranking round		Round of 32	Round of 16	Quarterfinals	Semifinals	Final / BM	
Athlete	Event	Score	Seed	Opposition Score	Opposition Score	Opposition Score	Opposition Score	Opposition Score	Rank
Aqil Ghazalli	Men's compound	700	18	Yağız Sezgin (TUR); L 145–147	Did not advance				

== Wushu ==
Malaysia qualified three athletes at the 2023 World Wushu Championships.

Athlete	Event	First routine	Second routine	Third routine	Total	Rank
Clement Ting	Men's changquan / daoshu / gunshu	Changquan; 9.436	Daoshu; 9.746	Gunshu; 9.633	28.815	5
Pang Pui Yee	Women's changquan / jianshu / qiangshu	Changquan; 9.730	Jianshu; 9.726	Qiangshu; 9.733	29.189	2nd place, silver medalist(s)
Tan Cheong Min	Women's nanquan / nandao	Nanquan; 9.746	Nandao; 9.733	—	19.479	1st place, gold medalist(s)
Sydney Chin Sy Xuan	Women's taijiquan / taijijian	Taijiquan; 9.68	Taijijian; 9.73	—	19.41	3rd place, bronze medalist(s)
