= Cameroon at the 2025 World Games =

- IOC code: CMR
- NOC: Cameroon Olympic and Sports Committee

in Chengdu, China 7 August 2025 – 17 August 2025
- Competitors: 4 (3 men and 1 woman) in 1 sport and 4 events

World Games appearances
- 1981; 1985; 1989; 1993; 1997; 2001; 2005; 2009; 2013; 2017; 2022; 2025

Cameroon competed at the 2025 World Games held in Chengdu, China from 7 to 17 August 2025.

Sambo fighter Seidou Nji Mouluh won the first ever World Games medal for the country, which is one bronze medal. The country finished in 77th place in the medal table.

== Medalist ==
Medal	Name	Sport	Event	Date
Bronze	Seidou Nji Mouluh	Sambo	Men's combat 98 kg	14 August

== Competitors ==
The following is the list of number of competitors in the Games.

Sport	Men	Women	Total
Sambo	3	1	4
Total	3	1	4
