= Benin at the 2025 World Games =

- IOC code: BEN
- NOC: Benin National Olympic and Sports Committee

in Chengdu, China 7 August 2025 – 17 August 2025
- Competitors: 2 (1 man and 1 woman) in 1 sport and 3 events
- Medals Ranked 51st: Gold 1 Silver 0 Bronze 0 Total 1

World Games appearances
- 1981; 1985; 1989; 1993; 1997; 2001; 2005; 2009; 2013; 2017; 2022; 2025

Benin competed at the 2025 World Games held in Chengdu, China from 7 to 17 August 2025.

Petanque player, Marcel Gbetable won the nation's first World Games medal in history. He won a gold medal in boules sports. The country finished in 51st place in the medal table.

== Medalist ==
Medal	Name	Sport	Event	Date
Gold	Marcel Gbetable	Boules sports	Men's petanque precision shooting	16 August

== Competitors ==
The following is the list of number of competitors in the Games.

Sport	Men	Women	Total
Boules sports	1	1	2
Total	1	1	2
