= Peru at the 2025 World Games =

- IOC code: PER
- NOC: Peruvian Olympic Committee

in Chengdu, China 7 August 2025 – 17 August 2025
- Competitors: 2 (1 man and 1 woman) in 1 sport and 2 events
- Medals Ranked 67th: Gold 0 Silver 1 Bronze 1 Total 2

World Games appearances
- 1981; 1985; 1989; 1993; 1997; 2001; 2005; 2009; 2013; 2017; 2022; 2025

Peru competed at the 2025 World Games held in Chengdu, China from 7 to 17 August 2025.

Athletes representing Peru won one silver medal and one bronze medal. The country finished in 67th place in the medal table

== Medalists ==
Medal	Name	Sport	Event	Date
Silver	Gerson Martínez	Billiard sports	Men's 10-ball pool	14 August
Bronze	Jackeline Perez	Billiard sports	Women's carom three cushion	12 August

== Competitors ==
The following is the list of number of competitors in the Games.

Sport	Men	Women	Total
Billards	1	1	2
Total	1	1	2
