= 2025 World Games =

Multi-sport event in Chengdu, China

The World Games 2025
- Host city: Chengdu, China
- Motto: 运动无限，气象万千 (Boundless Sports, Countless Wonders)
- Nations: 118
- Athletes: 3,693
- Events: 256 in 34 sports
- Opening: 7 August 2025
- Closing: 17 August 2025
- Opened by: Shen Yiqin; State Councillor of China
- Torch lighter: Xu Lu; Alu Xiaobo
- Ceremony venue: Tianfu International Convention Centre (opening ceremony); World Horticultural Expo Park (closing ceremony)
- Website: theworldgames2025.com

Location of Chengdu, China

The 2025 World Games (2025年世界运动会), also known as Chengdu 2025, were an international multi-sport event held from 7–17 August in Chengdu, Sichuan, China, with preliminary competition in some events beginning on 6 August. They were the 12th World Games, a multi-sport event featuring disciplines of Olympic sports and other competitions that are not currently contested at the Olympic Games.

It marked the first time that the World Games were hosted in the People's Republic of China, and marked the return to a four-year cycle after the 2021 World Games in Birmingham, Alabama were delayed to 2022 due to the COVID-19 pandemic.

== Bidding process ==
Luo Qiang, Mayor of Chengdu, signed the Organiser Agreement for TWG 2025, with the Vice President of IOC and the Chinese Olympic Committee as witness. President José Perurena signed on behalf of the International World Games Association (IWGA).

== Development and preparations ==
=== Venues ===
On 21 May 2024, the International World Games Association announced venues for the 2025 World Games. Some of the venues were also used during the 2021 Summer World University Games, also held in Chengdu.

==== Longquanyi District ====
Venue		Events	Capacity	Status
Dong'an Lake Sports Park	Athletics Field	Air sports	1,000	Existing
Dong'an Lake Sports Park	Central Square	Tug of war	TBA	Temporary
Dong'an Lake Sports Park	Gymnasium	Cheerleading	18,000	Existing
Dong'an Lake Sports Park	Gymnasium	Gymnastics (Acrobatic, Aerobic, Trampolining)	18,000	Existing
Qinglong Lake		Archery	619	Temporary
Longquan High School Gymnasium		Korfball (indoor)	TBA	Existing
Chengdu Sport University Sancha Lake Campus	Athletics Field	Flying disc (Ultimate)	9,800	Existing
Chengdu Sport University Sancha Lake Campus	Outdoor Courts	Boules sports	480	Existing
Chengdu Sport University Sancha Lake Campus	Natatorium	Lifesaving	1,398	Existing
Chengdu Sport University Sancha Lake Campus	Natatorium	Underwater sports (Finswimming, Freediving)	1,398	Existing

==== Eastern New Area ====
Venue	Events	Capacity	Status
Chengdu World Horticultural Expo Park Chengdu International Friendship Pavilion	Closing ceremony	TBA	Existing
Chengdu No. 7 High School Eastern Campus Athletics Field	Flag football	1,441	Existing
Chengdu No. 7 High School Eastern Campus Athletics Field	Lacrosse	1,441	Existing
Eastern New Area Orienteering Venue	Orienteering	TBA	Temporary

==== Tianfu New Area ====
Venue		Events	Capacity	Status
Tianfu International Convention Centre Tianfu Eaves		Opening ceremony	9,000	Temporary
Tianfu Park		Fistball	TBA	Temporary
Tianfu Park		Sport climbing	TBA	Temporary
Xinglong Lake	Beach Arena	Beach handball	TBA	Temporary
Xinglong Lake	Beach Arena	Korfball (Beach)	TBA	Temporary
Xinglong Lake	Hubin	Canoe sports (Canoe marathon, Dragon boat)	288	Temporary
Xinglong Lake	Hubin	Duathlon	775	Temporary
Xinglong Lake	Hubin	Gymnastics (Parkour)	757	Temporary
Civil Aviation Flight University of China Tianfu Campus Gymnasium		Billiard sports (Carrom, Pool, Snooker)	4,418	Existing
Chengdu Hi-Tech Zone Sports Centre	Gymnasium	Powerlifting	12,133	Existing
Chengdu Hi-Tech Zone Sports Centre	Gymnasium	Wushu	12,133	Existing
Chengdu Hi-Tech Zone Sports Centre	Public Fitness Gymnasium	Racquetball	TBA	Existing
Chengdu Hi-Tech Zone Sports Centre	Public Fitness Gymnasium	Squash	TBA	Existing
Guixi Park		Flying disc (Disc Golf)	TBA	Temporary

==== Wuhou District ====
Venue	Events	Capacity	Status
Sichuan Provincial Gymnasium	Kickboxing	7,000	Existing
Sichuan Provincial Gymnasium	Muaythai	7,000	Existing

==== Xindu District ====
Venue		Events	Capacity	Status
Chengdu Roller Sports Centre		Roller sports	681	New
Liaojiawan Shuyue Park		Roller sports	497	Temporary
Xindu Xiangcheng Sports Centre	Gymnasium	Floorball	3,164	Existing
Xindu Xiangcheng Sports Centre	Better City Softball Arena	Softball	940	Existing

==== Jianyang ====
Venue		Events	Capacity	Status
Sancha Lake	Ma'anshan Arena	Powerboating	329	Temporary
Sancha Lake	Ma'anshan Arena	Wakeboarding (Wake Surf Skim, Wakeboard Freestyle)	329	Temporary
Sancha Lake	Taohuadao Arena	Wakeboarding (Cable Wakeboard)	39	Temporary
Jianyang Cultural and Sports Centre	Gymnasium	Ju-jitsu	4,500	Existing
Jianyang Cultural and Sports Centre	Gymnasium	Karate	4,500	Existing
Jianyang Cultural and Sports Centre	Gymnasium	Sambo	4,500	Existing
Jianyang Cultural and Sports Centre	Natatorium	Canoe sports (Canoe polo)	3,000	Existing

==== Jinniu District ====
Venue	Events	Capacity	Status
Chengbei Gymnasium	Dancesport	2,500	Existing

=== Torch relay ===
For the first time in World Games history, a torch relay was held. The torch was revealed on 27 February 2025. Named Zhumeng, and designed by Feng Benyuan (who was one of the designers for the mascot of the 2022 Winter Paralympics) and Wang Anxu of the Jilin University of Arts, its design blends artistic forms, symbolic colors and cultural motifs in a style that reflects the spirit of the World Games and the heritage of the host nation.

On 21 July 2025, the organising committee announced that the torch relay would start on 26 July at the Sanxingdui Museum, and would travel through Chengdu, and neighboring cities Deyang and Meishan, and would visit several landmarks in the area; the Jinsha site, Chengdu Research Base of Giant Panda Breeding, Wuhou Shrine, San Su Shrine and Xinglong Lake Wetland Park. Around 120 torchbearers participated.

== The Games ==
=== Sports ===
34 sports, comprising 60 disciplines and 256 medal events, had been chosen for the 2025 World Games. For the first time, powerboating and cheerleading were represented at The World Games. In the sector of para sports, para freediving and para ju-jitsu made their debut. Three sports which had been in all previous editions of The World Games were dropped from the 2025 program: bowling, water-skiing, and artistic roller skating. Esports were also showcased as part of a partnership between the IWGA and the Global Esports Federation. Sumo, which originally debuted in 2001, was dropped as a consequence of unsportsmanlike conduct during competition at the 2022 World Games.

- Air sports (1) ^{T}
- Archery (7) ^{P}
- Beach handball (2) ^{B}
- Billiard sports (7)
  - Carom (2) ^{P}
  - Pool (3) ^{P}
  - Snooker (2) ^{P}
- Boules sports (6) ^{P}
- Canoe sports (12)
  - Canoe marathon (4) ^{T}
  - Canoe polo (2) ^{B}
  - Dragon boat (6) ^{T}
- Cheerleading (1) ^{AD}
- Dancesport (4) ^{AD}
- Duathlon (3) ^{T}
- Fistball (2) ^{B}
- Flag football (1) ^{B}
- Floorball (2) ^{B}
- Flying disc (2) ^{T}
- Gymnastics
  - Acrobatic gymnastics (5) ^{AD}
  - Aerobic gymnastics (4) ^{AD}
  - Parkour (4) ^{AD}
  - Trampoline gymnastics (6) ^{AD}
- Ju-jitsu (19) ^{M}
- Karate (12) ^{M}
- Kickboxing (12) ^{M}
- Korfball (2) ^{B}
- Lacrosse (1) ^{B}
- Lifesaving (16) ^{T}
- Muaythai (6) ^{M}
- Orienteering (5) ^{T}
- Powerboating (3) ^{T}
- Powerlifting (16) ^{S}
- Racquetball (3) ^{B}
- Roller sports (23)
  - Freestyle inline skating (4) ^{T}
  - Inline hockey (1) ^{B}
  - Road speed skating (8) ^{T}
  - Track speed skating (10) ^{T}
- Sambo (11) ^{M}
- Softball (2) ^{B}
- Sport climbing (6) ^{T}
- Squash (2) ^{B}
- Tug of war (3) ^{S}
- Underwater sports
  - Finswimming (16) ^{T}
  - Freediving (9) ^{T}
- Wakeboarding (6) ^{T}
- Wushu (12) ^{M}

Notes (Note: José Perurena, IWGA President, stated, "In Birmingham, for the first time, invitational sports were no longer presented separately but were also part of the official programme." This is now TWG policy.)
AD: Artistic and Dance sports (8)
B: Ball sports (11)
M: Martial arts (6)
P: Precision sports (3)
S: Strength sports (2)
T: Trend sports (16)

== Participants ==
As part of the IWGA's new "Growth Beyond Excellence" strategies, the athlete quota (including athletes and technical officials) for the sports program of the 2025 World Games and onwards was increased from 4,200 to 5,000. 4,000 participants are proposed by the IWGA Member Federations; while the remaining 1,000 participants consists of disciplines in consultation with the organizing committee, disciplines in determination with the International Olympic Committee's consultation and para disciplines which will be determined through consultation with the International Paralympic Committee.

Russia and Belarus were barred from taking part in the World Games due to their role in the Russian invasion of Ukraine. Instead, athletes from the two countries competed as independents, provided that the individual international sports federations allow their participation.

Participating Nations
- Afghanistan (1)
- Algeria (2)
- Argentina (65)
- Armenia (6)
- Aruba (1)
- Australia (121)
- Austria (55)
- Azerbaijan (14)
- Bahrain (1)
- Belgium (74)
- Benin (2)
- Bermuda (1)
- Bolivia (2)
- Brazil (53)
- Brunei (4)
- Bulgaria (15)
- Cambodia (15)
- Cameroon (3)
- Canada (130)
- Chile (28)
- China (326) (host)
- Colombia (50)
- Costa Rica (6)
- Ivory Coast (2)
- Croatia (39)
- Cuba (1)
- Cyprus (2)
- Czech Republic (125)
- Denmark (51)
- Dominican Republic (3)
- Ecuador (13)
- Egypt (24)
- El Salvador (1)
- Estonia (12)
- Finland (38)
- France (132)
- Georgia (1)
- Germany (212)
- Great Britain (94)
- Greece (19)
- Guatemala (9)
- Guinea (1)
- Hong Kong (24)
- Hungary (73)
- India (17)
- Individual Neutral Athletes (33)
- Indonesia (28)
- Iraq (2)
- Ireland (16)
- Iran (30)
- Israel (32)
- Italy (191)
- Jamaica (2)
- Japan (152)
- Jordan (2)
- Kazakhstan (31)
- Kosovo (1)
- Kenya (2)
- Kuwait (3)
- Kyrgyzstan (6)
- Latvia (29)
- Lebanon (3)
- Libya (1)
- Liechtenstein (1)
- Lithuania (5)
- Luxembourg (2)
- Madagascar (3)
- Malaysia (5)
- Mauritius (1)
- Mexico (40)
- Moldova (4)
- Mongolia (9)
- Montenegro (3)
- Morocco (10)
- Myanmar (12)
- Namibia (15)
- Nauru (1)
- Netherlands (88)
- New Zealand (55)
- Nigeria (1)
- Norway (13)
- Pakistan (3)
- Panama (2)
- Paraguay (1)
- Peru (2)
- Philippines (48)
- Poland (61)
- Portugal (56)
- Puerto Rico (17)
- Qatar (1)
- South Korea (64)
- Romania (30)
- San Marino (1)
- Saudi Arabia (3)
- Serbia (4)
- Singapore (44)
- Slovakia (34)
- Slovenia (7)
- South Africa (22)
- Spain (104)
- Suriname (14)
- Sweden (66)
- Switzerland (92)
- Chinese Taipei (120)
- Thailand (53)
- Tunisia (14)
- Turkmenistan (1)
- Turkey (22)
- Ukraine (84)
- United Arab Emirates (8)
- United States (180)
- Uruguay (1)
- Uzbekistan (19)
- Venezuela (24)
- Vietnam (25)
- Virgin Islands (1)

== Calendar ==
On 21 May 2024, the International World Games Association announced dates for the 2025 World Games.

All times and dates use China Standard Time (UTC+8)

OC	Opening ceremony	●	Event competitions	1	Event finals	CC	Closing ceremony

Event/Date		August 2025												Events
Event/Date		6 Wed	7 Thu	8 Fri	9 Sat	10 Sun	11 Mon	12 Tue	13 Wed	14 Thu	15 Fri	16 Sat	17 Sun	Events
Ceremonies			OC										CC	
Air sports	Drone racing									●	●	1		1
American football	Flag football									●	●	●	1	1
Archery			●	1	2		●	●	2	●	●	2		7
Softball		●	●	●	●	1			●	●	●	●	1	2
Billiard sports
Billiard sports	Carom					●	●	●	1	1				2
Billiard sports	Pool					●	●	●	1	2				3
Billiard sports	Snooker					●	●	●	1	1				2
Boules sports										●	2	2	2	6
Canoe sports
Canoe sports	Canoe marathon				2	2								4
Canoe sports	Canoe polo								●	●	●	2		2
Canoe sports	Dragon boat				1	5								6
Cheerleading	Pom										●	1		1
Dancesport				1	1							●	2	4
Duathlon										1	1		1	3
Fistball					●		●	●	2					2
Floorball		●	●	●	●	●	●	●	2					2
Flying disc
Flying disc	Disc golf			●	●	1								1
Flying disc	Ultimate							●	●	●	●	1		1
Gymnastics
Gymnastics	Acrobatic gymnastics			2	2	1								5
Gymnastics	Aerobic gymnastics										2	2		4
Gymnastics	Parkour							2	2					4
Gymnastics	Trampoline gymnastics			1	2	3								6
Beach handball			●	●	●	●	●	2						2
Ju-jitsu						7	7	5						19
Karate				6	6									12
Kickboxing								●	●	12				12
Korfball				●	●	●	●	1			●	●	1	2
Lacrosse	Lacrosse Sixes		●	●	●	●	1							1
Lifesaving				8	8									16
Muaythai				●	●	6								6
Orienteering				2		2	1							5
Powerboating											●	●	3	3
Powerlifting										4	4	4	4	16
Racquetball									●	●	●	●	3	3
Roller sports
Roller sports	Freestyle inline skating											2	2	4
Roller sports	Inline hockey		●	●	●	●	1							1
Roller sports	Road speed skating							4	4					8
Roller sports	Track speed skating									6	4			10
Sambo									6	6				12
Sport climbing										2	2	2		6
Squash				●	●	●	●	2						2
Tug of war					1	1	1							3
Underwater sports
Underwater sports	Finswimming					8	8							16
Underwater sports	Freediving					5	5							10
Wakeboarding				●	●	6								6
Wushu				2	4	●	●	6						12
Daily medal events		0	0	23	29	48	24	22	21	35	15	19	20	256
Cumulative total		0	0	23	52	100	124	146	167	202	217	236	256	256
Event/Date		August 2025												Events
Event/Date		6 Wed	7 Thu	8 Fri	9 Sat	10 Sun	11 Mon	12 Tue	13 Wed	14 Thu	15 Fri	16 Sat	17 Sun	Events

== Medal table ==
* Host nation (China)

Rank	Nation	Gold	Silver	Bronze	Total
1	China*	36	17	11	64
2	Germany	17	14	14	45
3	Ukraine	16	14	14	44
4	Italy	13	25	19	57
5	France	11	11	16	38
6	United States	11	10	7	28
7	Hungary	11	8	5	24
8	Spain	8	2	13	23
9	Japan	7	12	5	24
10	Colombia	7	8	6	21
11	Switzerland	7	5	2	14
12	Poland	6	6	2	14
13	Israel	6	4	4	14
14	Sweden	6	3	4	13
–	Individual Neutral Athletes	5	6	5	16
15	Chinese Taipei	5	6	4	15
16	Belgium	5	5	6	16
17	South Korea	5	2	7	14
18	Netherlands	4	5	6	15
19	Thailand	4	4	7	15
20	Indonesia	4	4	1	9
21	Mexico	4	3	3	10
22	Great Britain	4	2	4	10
23	Denmark	4	2	2	8
24	Canada	3	4	8	15
25	Czech Republic	3	4	2	9
26	Uzbekistan	3	3	5	11
27	Portugal	3	3	4	10
28	New Zealand	3	2	3	8
29	Hong Kong	3	2	1	6
30	Iran	3	1	3	7
31	Kazakhstan	2	5	3	10
32	Argentina	2	2	3	7
33	Brazil	2	0	2	4
34	El Salvador	2	0	0	2
34	Moldova	2	0	0	2
34	Tunisia	2	0	0	2
37	Turkey	1	4	0	5
38	Ecuador	1	3	1	5
39	Slovakia	1	2	3	6
40	Austria	1	2	1	4
40	United Arab Emirates	1	2	1	4
42	Finland	1	2	0	3
43	Australia	1	1	5	7
44	Egypt	1	1	4	6
45	Malaysia	1	1	1	3
46	Paraguay	1	1	0	2
47	Greece	1	0	2	3
47	Norway	1	0	2	3
49	Jordan	1	0	1	2
49	Morocco	1	0	1	2
51	Armenia	1	0	0	1
51	Benin	1	0	0	1
51	Bolivia	1	0	0	1
51	Georgia	1	0	0	1
51	Virgin Islands	1	0	0	1
56	Azerbaijan	0	5	0	5
57	Mongolia	0	3	0	3
57	South Africa	0	3	0	3
59	Croatia	0	2	3	5
60	Bulgaria	0	2	2	4
60	Philippines	0	2	2	4
62	Vietnam	0	2	1	3
63	Singapore	0	1	3	4
63	Slovenia	0	1	3	4
65	Guatemala	0	1	2	3
65	India	0	1	2	3
67	Estonia	0	1	1	2
67	Peru	0	1	1	2
67	Romania	0	1	1	2
67	Venezuela	0	1	1	2
71	Brunei	0	1	0	1
71	Cuba	0	1	0	1
71	Cyprus	0	1	0	1
71	Lebanon	0	1	0	1
75	Kyrgyzstan	0	0	3	3
76	Chile	0	0	2	2
77	Cameroon	0	0	1	1
77	Latvia	0	0	1	1
77	Lithuania	0	0	1	1
77	Montenegro	0	0	1	1
77	Namibia	0	0	1	1
77	Saudi Arabia	0	0	1	1
77	Serbia	0	0	1	1
Totals (83 entries)		258	254	257	769

== Marketing ==
The emblem for the games was revealed on 17 May 2024, designed by British designer, John Fairley. The design was inspired by the giant panda, hibiscus flower and Chinese knot.

The mascots for the games were revealed on 6 August 2024. Shubao, a giant panda and Jinzai, a golden snub-nosed monkey, were created to raise awareness about rare animals and biodiversity protection.

== Broadcasting ==
The Games were broadcast freely on The World Games Live platform.
