= Argentina at the 2025 World Games =

- IOC code: ARG
- NOC: Argentine Olympic Committee

in Chengdu, China 7 August 2025 – 17 August 2025
- Competitors: 75 (45 men and 30 women) in 13 sports and 24 events
- Medals Ranked 32nd: Gold 2 Silver 2 Bronze 3 Total 7

World Games appearances (overview)
- 1981; 1985; 1989; 1993; 1997; 2001; 2005; 2009; 2013; 2017; 2022; 2025

Argentina competed at the 2025 World Games held in Chengdu, China from 7 to 17 August 2025.

Athletes representing Argentina won seven medals: two golds, two silver and three bronzes, in which was the second most successful participation of Argentina at the World Games (just behind of 2017 tally of 3-1-2). The country finished in 32nd place in the medal table.

== Medalists ==
Medal	Name	Sport	Event	Date
Gold	Argentina women's national beach handball team	Beach handball	Women's tournament	12 August
Gold	Maria Vargas Parada	Racquetball	Women's singles	17 August
Silver	Diego García	Racquetball	Men's singles	17 August
Silver	Diego García; Maria Vargas Parada	Racquetball	Mixed doubles	17 August
Bronze	Eugenia de Armas	Water skiing	Women's Freestyle	10 August
Bronze	Sara Banchoff Tzancoff	Parkour	Women's speed	12 August
Bronze	Sara Banchoff Tzancoff	Parkour	Women's freestyle	13 August

== Competitors ==
The following is the list of number of competitors in the Games.

Sport	Men	Women	Total
Archery	0	1	1
Baseball	15	0	15
Billards	0	1	1
Boules sports	1	1	2
Canoe marathon	2	2	4
Fistball	10	10	20
Gymnastics	1	2	3
Handball	0	10	10
Kickboxing	1	0	1
Racquetball	1	1	2
Roller sports	14	0	14
Wakeboarding	0	1	1
Wushu	0	2	2
Total	45	30	75

== Archery ==
Athlete	Event	Ranking round		Elimination round				Semifinals	Final / BM	
Athlete	Event	Score	Seed	Opposition Score	Opposition Score	Opposition Score	Opposition Score	Opposition Score	Opposition Score	Rank
Claudia Carcacha	Women's individual barebow	286	10	Schafer (GER); L 56–61	Did not advance					

== Baseball ==
Summary

Team	Event	Group play				Semifinal	Final / BM	
Team	Event	Opposition Result	Opposition Result	Opposition Result	Rank	Opposition Result	Opposition Result	Rank
Argentina men	Men's tournament	Venezuela (VEN) L 2–3	Czech Republic (CZE) W 0–7	Japan (JPN) L 7–3	3	Australia (AUS) W 1–12	Czech Republic (CZE) W 0–3	5

== Beach handball ==
Argentina qualified at the 2024 Women's Beach Handball World Championships from China.

Team	Event	Preliminary round				Quarterfinals	Semifinal / PM	Final / BM / PM	
Team	Event	Opposition Result	Opposition Result	Opposition Result	Rank	Opposition Result	Opposition Result	Opposition Result	Rank
Argentina women's	Women's tournament	Portugal; W 2–0	Croatia; W 2–0	China; W 2–0	1 Q	Vietnam; W 2–0	Spain; W 2–1	Germany; W 2–1	(gold) Gold

== Billiards ==
=== Pool ===
Women

Athlete	Event	Preliminary round			Quarterfinal	Semifinal	Final/BM	Rank
Athlete	Event	Opposition Result	Opposition Result	Rank	Opposition Result	Opposition Result	Rank	Rank
Soledad Ayala	10-ball	Meng (AUS); L 4-7	Bryant (CAN); W 7-6	2 Q	Liu (CHN); L 4-7	Did not advance		

== Boules sports ==
Men

Athlete	Event	Qualification		Semifinals	Final / BM	
Athlete	Event	Result	Rank	Opposition Result	Opposition Result	Rank
Lucas Hecker	Men's lyonnaise progressive shooting	81	4 Q	Marsens (FRA); L 42-46	Soligon (ITA); L 38-42	4

Mixed

Athlete	Event	Qualification		Semifinals	Final / BM	
Athlete	Event	Result	Rank	Opposition Result	Opposition Result	Rank
Lucas Hecker; Milagros Pereyra	Doubles Quick shooting	72	6	Did not advance		

== Canoe marathon ==
Athlete	Event	Heats		Final	
Athlete	Event	Time	Rank	Time	Rank
Juan Ignacio Cáceres	Men's K-1 short distance	14:57.81	12 Q	14:16.87	6
Juan Ignacio Cáceres	Men's K-1 long distance	—N/a		1:43:21.27	15
Cecilia Collueque	Women's K-1 short distance	17:36.85	18	Did not advance	
Cecilia Collueque	Women's K-1 long distance	—N/a		1:51:43.71 (–1L)	17

== Fistball ==
Argentina qualified in the men's fistball tournament by finishing at 2023 World Championships and women's fistball tournament by finishing at 2023 South American Championship.

Team	Event	Group Stage				Quarterfinal	Semifinal	Final / BM	
Team	Event	Opposition Score	Opposition Score	Opposition Score	Rank	Opposition Score	Opposition Score	Opposition Score	Rank
Argentina men's	Men's tournament	New Zealand; W 3–0	Italy; L 1–3	Chile; L 3–1	3	—N/a	Italy; L 3–0	New Zealand; W 1–3	7
Argentina women's	Women's tournament	United States; W 3–0	New Zealand; W 3–2	Chile; L 3–0	2	—N/a	New Zealand; L 3–1	United States; W 1–3	7

|}

== Kick-boxing ==
Athlete	Event	Quarterfinal	Semifinal	Final / BM	
Athlete	Event	Opposition Result	Opposition Result	Opposition Result	Rank
Matías García	Men's K1 style 75 kg	Cinal (POL); L 0-3	Did not advance		

== Inline hockey ==
Summary

Team	Event	Group stage				Semifinal	Final / BM	
Team	Event	Opposition Score	Opposition Score	Opposition Score	Rank	Opposition Score	Opposition Score	Rank
Argentina men	Men's tournament	Czech Republic; L 0–7	France; L 1–2	Chinese Taipei; L 4–1	4	Chinese Taipei; L 4–1	China; W 4–5	7

== Parkour ==
Women

Athlete	Event	Qualification		Final	
Athlete	Event	Result	Rank	Result	Rank
Sara Banchoff Tzancoff	Women's speed	42:22	3 Q	39:52	(bronze) Bronze
Sara Banchoff Tzancoff	Women's freestyle	21.0	4 Q	20.6	(bronze) Bronze

== Racquetball ==
Athlete	Event	Round of 16	Quarterfinal	Semifinal	Final / BM	
Athlete	Event	Opposition Result	Opposition Result	Opposition Result	Opposition Result	Rank
Diego García	Men's singles	O'Keeney (IRL); W 11-6, 11-2, 11-3	Acuña (CRC); W 11-6, 11-8, 11-6	Galicia (GUA); W 12-10, 11-4, 11-9	Moscoso (BOL); L 11-9, 2-11, 9-11, 11-6, 12-14	(silver) Silver
Maria Vargas Parada	Women's singles	Dalvi (IND); W 11-2, 11-1, 11-3	Céspedes (DOM); W 11-1, 11-4, 11-1	Martínez (GUA); W 10-12, 14-12, 12-10, 12-6	Longoria (MEX); W 6-11, 11-8, 12-10, 11-9	(gold) Gold
Diego García; Maria Vargas Parada	Double	Ugalde / Villacreses (ECU); W 11-7, 11-5, 12-10	Portillo / Longoria (MEX); W 11-9, 11-8, 11-4	Kono / Kajino (JPN); W 11-4, 11-7, 11-7	Bredenbeck / Ros (USA); L 7-11, 9-11, 6-11	(silver) Silver

== Trampoline gymnastics ==
Athlete	Event	Qualification		Final	
Athlete	Event	Score	Rank	Score	Rank
Santiago Ferrari	Men's double mini-trampoline	47.100	8	Did not advance	

== Water skiing ==
Athlete	Event	Qualification		Semifinal		Final	
Athlete	Event	Result	Rank	Result	Rank	Result	Rank
Eugenia de Armas	Women's Freestyle	65.89	1 Q	69.11	2 Q	64.00	(bronze) Bronze
