= Canada at the 2025 World Games =

- IOC code: CAN
- NOC: Canadian Olympic Committee

in Chengdu, China 7 August 2025 – 17 August 2025
- Competitors: 125 (49 men and 76 women) in 17 sports and 50 events
- Medals Ranked 24th: Gold 3 Silver 4 Bronze 8 Total 15

World Games appearances
- 1981; 1985; 1989; 1993; 1997; 2001; 2005; 2009; 2013; 2017; 2022; 2025

Canada competed at the 2025 World Games held in Chengdu, China from 7 to 17 August 2025.

Athletes representing Canada won three gold medals, four silver medals and eight bronze medals. The country finished in 24th place in the medal table.

== Medallists ==
Medal	Name	Sport	Event	Date
Gold	Bailey Rush	Wakeboarding	Women's Skim	10 August
Gold	Brittany Schlater	Powerlifting	Women's super heavyweight	15 August
Gold	Rhaea Stinn	Powerlifting	Women's equipped super heavyweight	17 August
Silver	Felicia Marceau	Ju-jitsu	Women's 57 kg Ne-Waza	10 August
Silver	Lauren Black; Aurora Cordingley; Brooklyn Walker-Welch; Kylea Dobson; Erica Evans; Annabel Child; Bianca Chevarie; Lauren Spence; Maddy Baxter; Dylana Williams; Nicole Perroni; Jordan Dean	Lacrosse	Women's tournament	11 August
Silver	Nathan Dos Santos	Ju-jitsu	Men's open Ne-Waza	12 August
Silver	Malik Auger-Semmar; Anouchka Beaudry; Malcolm Bryson; Gagandeep Chatha; Florence Dionne; Brittney dos Santos; Thomas Edmonds; Sarah Jacobson; Lauren Kimura; Mika Kurahashi; Mark Lloyd; Martin Savoie-Gallant; Quinn Snider; Molly Wedge	Flying disc	Mixed ultimate	16 August
Bronze	Vegard Jarvis Westergård	Orienteering	Men's middle distance	8 August
Bronze	Gavin Dodd	Trampoline gymnastics	Men's double mini	9 August
Bronze	Canada men's national softball team: Jordan Hudson; Nick White; Kyle Ezekiel; Derek Hyde; Justin Shofield; Jordan Pomeroy; Blake Hunter; Justin Laskowski; Tyler Randerson; Mitch Mckay; Max Major; Shane Boland; Sean Cleary; Bradley Ezekiel; Ty Sebastian	Softball	Men's tournament	10 August
Bronze	Sarah Milette; Sophiane Méthot	Trampoline gymnastics	Women's synchronized	10 August
Bronze	Dwayne Morin	Kickboxing	Men's point fighting 84 kg	14 August
Bronze	Clifton Pho	Powerlifting	Men's lightweight	15 August
Bronze	Coby Iwaasa; Frédérique Lambert	Racquetball	Mixed doubles	16 August
Bronze	Canada women's national flag football team: Clara Beaudoin; Rosalie Landry; Lauriane Beauchamp; Emma Racine; Sara Parker; Sabrina Gervais; Caroline Moquin-Joubert; Lea Duval; Alexan Fournier; Catherine Gaumont; Laurence Caron; Laura Molimard	Flag football	Women's tournament	17 August

== Competitors ==
The following is the list of number of competitors in the Games.

Sport	Men	Women	Total
Archery	1	1	2
Billards	0	1	1
Flag football	0	12	12
Floorball	14	14	28
Flying disc	7	7	14
Gymnastics	1	2	3
Ju-jitsu	2	1	3
Karate	0	2	2
Kickboxing	0	1	1
Lacrosse	0	10	10
Orienteering	4	0	4
Powerboating	1	1	2
Powerlifting	0	5	5
Racquetball	1	1	2
Softball	15	15	30
Wakeboarding	2	2	4
Wushu	1	1	2
Total	49	76	125

== Archery ==
Barebow/recurve

Athlete	Event	Qualification		Elimination 1	Elimination 2	Elimination 3	Elimination 4	Semifinal	Final / BM	
Athlete	Event	Score	Rank	Opposition Result	Opposition Result	Opposition Result	Opposition Result	Opposition Result	Opposition Result	Rank
	Men's barebow									
	Women's recurve									

== Flag football ==
Women

Team	Event	Group play				Quarterfinals	Semifinal	Final / BM	
Team	Event	Opposition Result	Opposition Result	Opposition Result	Rank	Opposition Result	Opposition Result	Opposition Result	Rank
Canada women	Women's tournament	United States; L 39–31	China; W 48–12	Austria; W 34–25	2 Q	Japan; W 32–27	Mexico; L 25–13	Austria; W 20–38	3rd place, bronze medalist(s)

== Floorball ==
Summary

Team	Event	Preliminary round				Semifinal	Final / BM / PF	
Team	Event	Opposition Result	Opposition Result	Opposition Result	Rank	Opposition Result	Opposition Result	Rank
Canada men	Men's tournament	Czech Republic; L 29–1	Finland; L 24–1	China; W 15–1	3	—N/a	Latvia; L 12–3	6
Canada women	Women's tournament	Finland; L 36–0	Czech Republic; L 16–0	Singapore; L 1–14	4	—N/a	Thailand; L 7–4	8

== Ju-jitsu ==
Canada competed in ju-jitsu.

Athlete	Event	Elimination round			Round of 16	Quarterfinal	Semifinal	Repechage 1	Repechage 2	Final / BM	
Athlete	Event	Opposition Result	Opposition Result	Rank	Opposition Result	Opposition Result	Opposition Result	Opposition Result	Opposition Result	Opposition Result	Rank
Michael Sheehan	Men's ne-waza 77 kg										
Nathan Santos	Men's ne-waza 85 kg										
Felicia Marceau	Women's ne-waza 57 kg										

== Kickboxing ==
Canada competed qualified athlete.

Athlete	Event	Quarterfinal	Semifinal	Final / BM	
Athlete	Event	Opposition Result	Opposition Result	Opposition Result	Rank
Mejia Estivariz	Women's point-fighting –50 kg				

== Lacrosse ==
Summary

Team	Event	Preliminary round				Semifinal	Final / BM	
Team	Event	Opposition Result	Opposition Result	Opposition Result	Rank	Opposition Result	Opposition Result	Rank
Canada women	Women's tournament							

== Powerlifting ==
Classic

Athlete	Event	Exercises			Total weight	Total points	Rank
Athlete	Event	Squat	Bench press	Deadlift	Total weight	Total points	Rank
Clifton Pho	Men's lightweight	235.0	147.5	318.5 WR	700.5	109.75	3rd place, bronze medalist(s)
Walter Cariazo	Men's heavyweight	300.0	212.5	352.5	865.0	106.97	6
Lucas Wiseman	Men's Super heavyweight	365.0	195.0	367.5	927.5	108.35	6
Aurelie Nguyen	Women's lightweight	135.0	80.0	172.5	387.5	108.15	8
Danielle Philibert	Women's super heavyweight	202.5	127.5	205.0	535.0	99.87	8
Brittany Schlater	Women's Super heavyweight	287.5	160.0	227.5	725.0	122.73	1st place, gold medalist(s)

Equipped

Athlete	Event	Exercises			Total weight	Total points	Rank
Athlete	Event	Squat	Bench press	Deadlift	Total weight	Total points	Rank
Simone Lai	Women's lightweight	175.0	85.0	167.5	427.5	90.25	7
Rhaea Stinn	Women's Super heavyweight	257.5	210.0	217.5	685.0	109.24	1st place, gold medalist(s)

== Racquetball ==
Athlete	Event	Round of 16	Quarterfinal	Semifinal	Final / BM	
Athlete	Event	Opposition Result	Opposition Result	Opposition Result	Opposition Result	Rank
Coby Iwaasa	Men's singles	de León (DOM); W 9–11, 5–11, 11–9, 11–2, 11–2	Moscoso (BOL); L 12–10, 8–11, 11–1, 11–5			
Frederique Lambert	Women's singles	Lee S-m (KOR); W 11–9, 11–1, 12–10	Longoria (MEX); L 11–4, 11–7, 11–8			
Coby Iwaasa; Frederique Lambert	Mixed Doubles	O'Keeney / Hickey (IRL); W11–1, 11–5, 12–10	Galicia (GUA); Martínez (GUA); W 11–9, 9–11, 11–4, 11–8	Bredenbeck / Ros (USA); L 9–11, 11–5, 8–11, 11–9, 11–9	Kono / Kajino (JPN); W 11–3, 11–7, 7–11, 11–4	Bronze

== Softball ==
Men

Team	Event	Group play				Semifinal	Final / BM	
Team	Event	Opposition Result	Opposition Result	Opposition Result	Rank	Opposition Result	Opposition Result	Rank
Canada men	Men's tournament	Australia (AUS) W 11–2	United States (USA) L 6–3	Singapore (SGP) W 8–9	2	Japan (JPN) L 1–6	Venezuela (VEN) Cancelled	3rd place, bronze medalist(s)

Women

Team	Event	Group play				Semifinal	Final / BM	
Team	Event	Opposition Result	Opposition Result	Opposition Result	Rank	Opposition Result	Opposition Result	Rank
Canada women	Women's tournament	Puerto Rico (PUR) W 11–9	Australia (AUS) W 9–0	Japan (JPN) W 1–2	1	Chinese Taipei (TPE) L 6–4	Japan (JPN) L 11–1	4

== Trampoline gymnastics ==
Canada qualified athletes at the 2023 Trampoline Gymnastics World Championships.

Athlete	Event	Qualification		Final	
Athlete	Event	Score	Rank	Score	Rank
	Men's double mini-trampoline				
	Women's double mini-trampoline				
	Women's synchronised				
