= Racquetball at the 2025 World Games =

- Venue: Chengdu High-Tech Zone Sports Center
- Dates: 13–17 August
- No. of events: 3
- Competitors: 32 from 16 nations

The racquetball competition at the 2025 World Games took place from 13 to 17 August at the Chengdu High-Tech Zone Sports Center in Chengdu, China.

== Qualification ==
Sixteen men and sixteen women qualified for the 2025 World Games at the 2024 World Championships in San Antonio, United States.

== Participating nations ==
- Argentina (2)
- Bolivia (2)
- Canada (2)
- Chinese Taipei (2)
- Costa Rica (2)
- Dominican Republic (2)
- Ecuador (2)
- Germany (2)
- Guatemala (2)
- India (2)
- Ireland (2)
- Italy (2)
- Japan (2)
- Mexico (2)
- South Korea (2)
- United States (2)

== Medal table ==
| Rank | Nation | Gold | Silver | Bronze | Total |
|---|---|---|---|---|---|
| 1 | Argentina | 1 | 2 | 0 | 3 |
| 2 | Bolivia | 1 | 0 | 0 | 1 |
| 2 | United States | 1 | 0 | 0 | 1 |
| 4 | Mexico | 0 | 1 | 1 | 2 |
| 5 | Canada | 0 | 0 | 1 | 1 |
| 5 | Guatemala | 0 | 0 | 1 | 1 |
| Totals (6 entries) | | 3 | 3 | 3 | 9 |

== Events ==
| Event | Gold | Silver | Bronze |
|---|---|---|---|
| Men's singles | Conrrado Moscoso; Bolivia | Diego García; Argentina | Eduardo Portillo; Mexico |
| Women's singles | María José Vargas; Argentina | Paola Longoria; Mexico | Gabriela Martínez; Guatemala |
| Mixed doubles | United States; Jake Bredenbeck; Naomi Ros | Argentina; Diego García; María José Vargas | Canada; Coby Iwaasa; Frederique Lambert |
