= Canoe marathon at the 2025 World Games – Men's K-1 short distance =

Men's K1 short distance at the 2025 World Games
- Venue: Xinglong Lake, Chengdu, China
- Date: 9 August
- Competitors: 20 from 20 nations

Medalists
1st place, gold medalist(s)		Mads Pedersen	Denmark
2nd place, silver medalist(s)		Hamish Lovemore	South Africa
3rd place, bronze medalist(s)		José Ramalho	Portugal

The men's K1 short distance competition in canoe marathon at the 2025 World Games took place on 9 August 2025 at Xinglong Lake in Chengdu, China.

A total of 20 athletes participated from 20 nations.

== Results ==
=== Heats ===
The fastest five athletes from each heat and the five next best times qualified for the final. Results were as follows:

Rank	Heat	Athlete	Nation	Time	Notes
1	2	Hamish Lovemore	South Africa	14:34.74	Q
2	2	Jérémy Candy	France	14:35.95	Q
3	2	James Russell	Great Britain	14:36.43	Q
4	2	Bálint Noé	Hungary	14:40.17	Q
5	1	Iván Alonso	Spain	14:47.90	Q
6	1	Nico Paufler	Germany	14:47.94	Q
7	1	José Ramalho	Portugal	14:48.47	Q
8	1	Jon Vold	Norway	14:49.44	Q
9	2	Joshua Kippin	Australia	14:53.75	Q
10	2	Daan Cox	Belgium	14:55.81	q
11	1	Mads Pedersen	Denmark	14:57.37	Q
12	2	Juan Ignacio Cáceres	Argentina	14:57.81	q
13	1	Andrea Dal Bianco	Italy	14:58.33	q
14	2	Paul Donnellan	Ireland	15:00.39	q
15	2	Jakub Zavřel	Czech Republic	15:03.94	q
16	1	Igor Wyszkowski	Poland	15:25.50	
17	1	Maksym Redko	Ukraine	15:27.68	
18	1	Milan Dekker	Netherlands	15:48.18	q
19	1	Ding Shengkai	China	16:35.32	
20	2	Hiroki Shimogawa	Japan	16:55.21	

=== Final ===
Results were as follows:

Rank	Athlete	Nation	Time	Notes
1st place, gold medalist(s)	Mads Pedersen	Denmark	13:45.46	
2nd place, silver medalist(s)	Hamish Lovemore	South Africa	13:45.61	
3rd place, bronze medalist(s)	José Ramalho	Portugal	14:08.95	
4	Jérémy Candy	France	14:13.33	
5	Nico Paufler	Germany	14:16.26	
6	Juan Ignacio Cáceres	Argentina	14:16.87	
7	Jon Vold	Norway	14:17.03	
8	Bálint Noé	Hungary	14:22.08	
9	Iván Alonso	Spain	14:31.29	
10	James Russell	Great Britain	14:38.95	
11	Joshua Kippin	Australia	14:43.29	
12	Jakub Zavřel	Czech Republic	14:45.44	
13	Paul Donnellan	Ireland	14:48.81	
14	Andrea Dal Bianco	Italy	14:52.66	
15	Milan Dekker	Netherlands	14:54.83	
16	Daan Cox	Belgium	15:39.77	
