= Parkour at the 2025 World Games – Women's freestyle =

Women's freestyle at the 2025 World Games
- Venue: Xinglong Lake, Chengdu, China
- Date: 13 August
- Competitors: 10 from 10 nations

Medalists
1st place, gold medalist(s)		Shang Chunsong	China
2nd place, silver medalist(s)		Nene Nagai	Japan
3rd place, bronze medalist(s)		Sara Banchoff Tzancoff	Argentina

The women's freestyle competition in parkour at the 2025 World Games took place on 13 August 2025 at Xinglong Lake in Chengdu, China.

A total of ten athletes participated from ten nations.

== Competition format ==
Eight athletes with the highest score in the qualifications advanced to the final.

== Results ==
=== Qualification ===
The results were as follows;

Rank	Athlete	Nation	Difficulty	Execution	Total score
1	Shang Chunsong	China	13.5	10.6	24.1
2	Noa Man	Netherlands	10.2	11.2	21.4
3	Nene Nagai	Japan	9.0	12.3	21.3
4	Sara Banchoff Tzancoff	Argentina	7.3	13.7	21.0
5	Audrey Johnson	United States	8.5	11.5	20.0
6	Stefanny Navarro	Spain	7.5	11.8	19.3
7	Adela Merkova	Czech Republic	9.1	10.1	19.2
8	Miranda Tibbling	Sweden	5.9	10.6	16.5
9	Stephania Zitis	Australia	3.6	12.4	16.0
10	Sirinnaphat Atchariyadamrongkul	Thailand	4.3	11.4	15.7

=== Final ===
The results were as follows;

Rank	Athlete	Nation	Difficulty	Execution	Total score
1st place, gold medalist(s)	Shang Chunsong	China	13.5	11.2	24.7
2nd place, silver medalist(s)	Nene Nagai	Japan	10.0	12.9	22.9
3rd place, bronze medalist(s)	Sara Banchoff Tzancoff	Argentina	7.3	13.3	20.6
4	Audrey Johnson	United States	8.7	11.8	20.5
5	Noa Man	Netherlands	10.3	9.8	20.1
6	Stefanny Navarro	Spain	7.7	11.3	19.0
7	Miranda Tibbling	Sweden	6.5	12.2	18.7
8	Adela Merkova	Czech Republic	6.3	4.5	10.8
