= Sweden at the 2025 World Games =

- IOC code: SWE
- NOC: Swedish Olympic Committee

in Chengdu, China 7 August 2025 – 17 August 2025
- Competitors: 68 (27 men and 41 women) in 12 sports and 28 events
- Medals Ranked 14th: Gold 6 Silver 3 Bronze 4 Total 13

World Games appearances
- 1981; 1985; 1989; 1993; 1997; 2001; 2005; 2009; 2013; 2017; 2022; 2025

Sweden competed at the 2025 World Games held in Chengdu, China from 7 to 17 August 2025. Athletes representing Sweden won six gold medals, three silver medals and four bronze medals. The country finished in 14th place in the medal table.

== Medalists ==
Medal	Name	Sport	Event	Date
Gold	Melina Andersson	Canoe marathon	Women's K1 short distance	9 August
Gold	Melina Andersson	Canoe marathon	Women's K1 long distance	10 August
Gold	Astrid Schölin	Ju-jitsu	Women's 57 kg Ne-Waza	10 August
Gold	Miranda Tibbling	Parkour	Women's speed	12 August
Gold	Sweden men	Floorball	Men's tournament	13 August
Gold	Alba Boström	Powerlifting	Women's middleweight	14 August
Silver	Emma Bjessmo; Jonatan Gustafsson; August Mollén; Alva Sonesson	Orienteering	Sprint relay	11 August
Silver	Sweden women	Floorball	Women's tournament	13 August
Silver	Gustav Hedlund	Powerlifting	Men's heavyweight	15 August
Bronze	Alva Sonesson	Orienteering	Women's middle distance	8 August
Bronze	Ronja Ekstedt; Emelie Goransson; Asa Haby; Frida Hed; Karin Jacobson; Anna Nasslander; Magdalena Persson; Hanna Westerling	Tug of war	Women's outdoor 500 kg	10 August
Bronze	Emil Norling	Powerlifting	Men's heavyweight	15 August
Bronze	Matilda Vilmar	Powerlifting	Women's equipped heavyweight	17 August

Medals by sport
Sport	1st place, gold medalist(s)	2nd place, silver medalist(s)	3rd place, bronze medalist(s)	Total
Canoe marathon	2	0	0	2
Powerlifting	1	1	2	4
Floorball	1	1	0	2
Ju-jitsu	1	0	0	1
Parkour	1	0	0	1
Orieentering	0	1	1	2
Tug of war	0	0	1	1
Total	6	3	4	13

== Competitors ==
The following is the list of number of competitors in the Games.

Sport	Men	Women	Total
Archery	1	1	2
Billards	1	0	1
Canoe marathon	0	2	2
Floorball	14	14	28
Gymnastics	1	2	3
Ju-jitsu	0	4	4
Karate	1	0	1
Muaythai	1	0	1
Orienteering	2	2	4
Powerboating	1	0	1
Powerlifting	2	2	4
Tug of war	0	11	11
Total	27	41	68

== Floorball ==
Summary

Team	Event	Preliminary round				Semifinal	Final / BM / PF	
Team	Event	Opposition Result	Opposition Result	Opposition Result	Rank	Opposition Result	Opposition Result	Rank
Sweden men	Men's tournament	Switzerland; W 8–1	Philippines; W 1–11	Latvia; W 7–1	1	Czech Republic; W 5–4	Finland; W 2–1	1st place, gold medalist(s)
Sweden women	Women's tournament	Thailand; W 2–21	Switzerland; W 7–3	Slovakia; W 15–4	1	Czech Republic; W 3–1	Finland; L 2–3	2nd place, silver medalist(s)

== Gymnastics ==
=== Parkour ===
Women

Athlete	Event	Qualification		Final	
Athlete	Event	Result	Rank	Result	Rank
Miranda Tibbling	Women's speed	38.68	1 Q	36.62	1st place, gold medalist(s)
Miranda Tibbling	Women's freestyle	16.5	8 Q	18.7	7

== Powerlifting ==
Classic

Athlete	Event	Exercises			Total weight	Total points	Rank
Athlete	Event	Squat	Bench press	Deadlift	Total weight	Total points	Rank
Alba Boström	Women's middleweight	200.0	135.0	230.0	565.0	123.83	1st place, gold medalist(s)
Gustav Hedlund	Men's heavyweight	325.0	225.0	340.0	890.0	116.57	2nd place, silver medalist(s)
Emil Norling	Men's heavyweight	240.0	220.0	362.5	922.5	113.93	3rd place, bronze medalist(s)

Equipped

Athlete	Event	Exercises			Total weight	Total points	Rank
Athlete	Event	Squat	Bench press	Deadlift	Total weight	Total points	Rank
Alexander Eriksson	Men's lightweight	290.0	197.5	292.5	780.0	104.58	4
Matilda Vilmar	Women's heavyweight	252.5	180.0	205.0	637.5	109.67 GR	3rd place, bronze medalist(s)
Frida Wik	Women's heavyweight	232.5	162.5	222.5	617.5	101.89	6

== Tug of war ==
Athlete	Event	Group stage						Semi-final	Final / BM	
Athlete	Event	Opposition Score	Opposition Score	Opposition Score	Opposition Score	Opposition Score	Rank	Opposition Score	Opposition Score	Rank
Team Sweden	Women's outdoor 500 kg									
