= Parkour at the 2025 World Games – Women's speed =

Women's speed at the 2025 World Games
- Venue: Xinglong Lake, Chengdu, China
- Date: 12 August
- Competitors: 9 from 9 nations

Medalists
1st place, gold medalist(s)		Miranda Tibbling	Sweden
2nd place, silver medalist(s)		Noa Man	Netherlands
3rd place, bronze medalist(s)		Sara Banchoff Tzancoff	Argentina

The women's speed competition in parkour at the 2025 World Games took place on 12 August 2025 at Xinglong Lake in Chengdu, China.

A total of nine athletes participated from nine nations.

== Competition format ==
The fastest six athletes in the qualifications advanced to the final.

== Results ==
=== Qualification ===
The results were as follows;

Rank	Athlete	Nation	Time	Notes
1	Miranda Tibbling	Sweden	38.68	Q
2	Noa Man	Netherlands	39.53	Q
3	Sara Banchoff Tzancoff	Argentina	42.22	Q
4	Kseniya Momchilova	Bulgaria	43.07	Q
5	Audrey Johnson	United States	43.80	Q
6	Raquel Olson	Mexico	45.34	Q
7	Stefanny Navarro	Spain	46.44	
8	Stephania Zitis	Australia	58.17	
9	Sirinnaphat Atchariyadamrongkul	Thailand	1:09.27	

=== Final ===
The results were as follows;

Rank	Athlete	Nation	Time
1st place, gold medalist(s)	Miranda Tibbling	Sweden	36.62
2nd place, silver medalist(s)	Noa Man	Netherlands	37.67
3rd place, bronze medalist(s)	Sara Banchoff Tzancoff	Argentina	39.52
4	Audrey Johnson	United States	40.33
5	Kseniya Momchilova	Bulgaria	41.45
6	Raquel Olson	Mexico	42.54
