= Dominican Republic at the 2025 World Games =

- IOC code: DOM
- NOC: Dominican Republic Olympic Committee

in Chengdu, China 7 August 2025 – 17 August 2025
- Competitors: 3 (1 man and 2 women) in 2 sports and 4 events

World Games appearances
- 1981; 1985; 1989; 1993; 1997; 2001; 2005; 2009; 2013; 2017; 2022; 2025

Dominican Republic will compete at the 2025 World Games held in Chengdu, China from 7 to 17 August 2025.

== Competitors ==
The following is the list of number of competitors in the Games.

Sport	Men	Women	Total
Racquetball	1	1	2
Sambo	0	1	1
Total	1	2	3

== Racquetball ==
Athlete	Event	Round of 16	Quarterfinal	Semifinal	Final / BM	
Athlete	Event	Opposition Result	Opposition Result	Opposition Result	Opposition Result	Rank
Ramón de León	Men's singles	C Iwaasa (MEX); L 2-3; 11-9, 11-5, 9-11, 2-11, 2-11	did not advance			9
María Céspedes	Women's singles	H Kajino (JPN); W 3-0; 11-4, 11-3, 11-2	MJ Vargas (ARG); L 0-3; 1-11, 4-11, 1-11	did not advance		5
Ramón de León; María Céspedes	Double	A Acuña (CRC); F Larissa (CRC); L 1-3; 9-11, 11-9, 6-11, 7-11	did not advance			9

== Sambo ==
Athlete	Event	Quarterfinal	Semifinal	Final / BM	
Athlete	Event	Opposition Result	Opposition Result	Opposition Result	Rank
María Peña	Women's –65 kg	Sofia Istomina; Individual Neutral Athletes; L 1–7^{VP}	Did not advance		
