= Racquetball at the 2025 World Games – Women's singles =

Racquetball – Women's singles at the 2025 World Games
- Venue: Chengdu High-Tech Zone Sports Center, Chengdu, China
- Dates: 13–17 August
- Competitors: 16 from 16 nations

Medalists
| gold medal | María José Vargas | Argentina |
| silver medal | Paola Longoria | Mexico |
| bronze medal | Gabriela Martínez | Guatemala |

The women's singles event in racquetball at the 2025 World Games took place from 13 to 17 August 2025 at the Chengdu High-Tech Zone Sports Center in Chengdu, China.

== Competition format ==
A total of 16 athletes from 16 different countries competed in a single-elimination tournament in Chengdu.

== Summary ==
María José Vargas of Argentina won gold by defeating 3 time defending World Games gold medalist Paola Longoria of Mexico. Vargas is the first woman other than Longoria to win gold at a World Games since American Michelle Gould won at the 1993 World Games. Guatemalan Gabriela Martinez was the bronze medalist, as she got a walkover win over Bolivian Angélica Barrios, who was injured during her semi-final match with Longoria. Martinez's bronze medal was her 2nd World Games medal, as she was the silver medalist at the 2022 World Games in Birmingham, Alabama, where she lost the final to Longoria.

== Results ==
Round of 16
1 | P Longoria (MEX) | 11 | 11 | 11
16 | Y Wang (TPE) | 1 | 2 | 2
9 | Lee S-m (KOR) | 9 | 1 | 10
8 | F Lambert (CAN) | 11 | 11 | 12
5 | A Barrios (BOL) | 11 | 11 | 11
12 | A Hickey (IRL) | 9 | 2 | 6
13 | MÁ Villacreses (ECU) | 5 | 2 | 12 | 1
4 | N Ros (USA) | 11 | 11 | 10 | 11
3 | MJ Vargas (ARG) | 11 | 11 | 11
14 | SA Dalvi (IND) | 2 | 1 | 3
11 | H Kajino (JPN) | 4 | 3 | 2
6 | M Céspedes (DOM) | 11 | 11 | 11
7 | C Amaya (ITA) | 6 | 11 | 7 | 6
10 | F Larissa (CRC) | 11 | 5 | 11 | 11
15 | A Grisar (GER) | 5 | 0 | 4
2 | AG Martínez (GUA) | 11 | 11 | 11

Quarter-finals
1 | P Longoria (MEX) | 11 | 11 | 11
8 | F Lambert (CAN) | 4 | 7 | 8
5 | A Barrios (BOL) | 10 | 11 | 11 | 11
4 | N Ros (USA) | 12 | 9 | 8 | 9
3 | MJ Vargas (ARG) | 11 | 11 | 11
6 | M Céspedes (DOM) | 1 | 4 | 1
10 | F Larissa (CRC) | 8 | 3 | 8
2 | AG Martínez (GUA) | 11 | 11 | 11

Semi-finals
1 | P Longoria (MEX) | 9 | 11 | 12 | 9 | 10
5 | A Barrios (BOL) | 11 | 8 | 10 | 11 | 9^{r}
3 | MJ Vargas (ARG) | 10 | 14 | 12 | 11
2 | AG Martínez (GUA) | 12 | 12 | 10 | 6

Final
1 | P Longoria (MEX) | 11 | 8 | 10 | 9
3 | MJ Vargas (ARG) | 6 | 11 | 12 | 11
Third place
5 | A Barrios (BOL)
2 | AG Martínez (GUA) | w/o

== See also ==
- Racquetball at the 2025 World Games – Men's singles
- Racquetball at the 2025 World Games - Doubles
