= Softball at the 2025 World Games =

- Venue: Xindu Xiangcheng Sports Centre Softball Stadium
- Dates: 6–10 August 2025 (men); 13–17 August 2025 (women)
- No. of events: 2
- Competitors: 20 teams from 12 nations

The softball competition at the 2025 World Games took place from 6 to 17 August 2025 at the Softball Stadium within the Xindu Xiangcheng Sports Centre in Chengdu, China. The discipline included two events: a women's tournament, and for the first time in the games, a men's tournament as well.

== Qualification ==
A total of eight teams qualified for each event:

Event	Total places	Qualified NOCs
Men's
Host nation	0 (Note: China opted not to participate in the men's softball competition, two wild cards have been awarded to world No. 13 Singapore and No. 7 Czech Republic to grant continental representation.)	—N/a
WBSC World Rankings	6	Argentina; Australia; Japan; Canada; Venezuela; United States
Wildcard	2	Czech Republic; Singapore
Women's
Host nation	1	China
WBSC World Rankings	6	United States; Japan; Puerto Rico; Chinese Taipei; Netherlands; Canada
Wildcard	1	Australia

== Participating nations ==
- Argentina (1)
- Australia (2)
- Canada (2)
- China (1)
- Chinese Taipei (1)
- Czech Republic (1)
- Japan (2)
- Netherlands (1)
- Puerto Rico (1)
- Singapore (1)
- United States (2)
- Venezuela (1)

== Medal table ==
* Host nation (China)

Rank	Nation	Gold	Silver	Bronze	Total
1	United States	2	0	0	2
2	Japan	1	0	1	2
3	Chinese Taipei	0	1	0	1
4	Canada	0	0	1	1
4	Venezuela	0	0	1	1
Totals (5 entries)		3	1	3	7

== Medalists ==
Event	Gold	Silver	Bronze
Men's tournament	Japan; Koki Sato; Kaito Masaki; Ryuji Okawa; Yusuke Sakuraba; Kotaro Yasumi; Seii Kuroiwa; Hiroki Ikeda; Fumiya Ueda; Taiyo Kataoka; Kanta Nishida; Shota Onodera; Yusuke Morita; Fuga Nagai; Kazuya Toriyama; Tei Hamamoto United States; Blaine Milheim; Tyler Johnson; Jeffrey Lewis; Nicholas Mullins; Erick Ochoa; Zachary Shaw; Marco Diaz; Tyler Damon; Frank Kimlinger; Brennan Ducharme; Bradley Kilpatrick; Jonathan Lynch; Yusef Davis Jr. Braden Ducharme; Cody Gibbons	not awarded	Canada; Max Major; Nick White; Kyle Ezekiel; Blake Hunter; Ty Sebastian; Bradley Ezekiel; Jordan Hudson; Jordan Pomeroy; Mitch McKay; Justin Schofield; Sean Cleary; Derek Hyde; Tyler Randerson; Shane Boland; Justin Laskowski Venezuela; Pedro Flores; Luis Colombo; Ángel Adames; Jean Flores; Engelbert Herrera; José Dorantes; Rogelio Sequera; Edruin Ramírez; Franklin Benítez; Rafael Flores; Kleiver Rodríguez; Erwin Díaz; Eudomar Toyo; Alfredo Aguilar
Women's tournament	United States; Skylar Wallace; Ally Carda; Maya Brady; Jayda Coleman; Amanda Lorenz; Rachel Garcia; Janae Jefferson; Tiare Jennings; Megan Faraimo; Sahvanna Jaquish; Kelly Maxwell; Jessie Warren; Dejah Mulipola; Hannah Flippen; Bubba Nickles	Chinese Taipei; Shen Chia-wen; Ke Hsia-ai; Li Szu-shih; Ho Yi-fan; Chen Ching-yu; Su Yi-hsuan; Chiang Ting-en; Yeh Kuei-ping; Yang An-chi; Liu Hsuan; Chen Chia-yi; Chu Yi-shan; Tu Ya-ting; Lin Feng-chen; Lin Chih-ying	Japan; Sakura Miwa; Kanna Kudo; Kyoko Ishikawa; Yui Sakamoto; Minori Naito; Yuuki Kamata; Ayana Karoji; Yukari Hamamura; Yukiko Ueno; Natsumi Fujimori; Urara Fujimoto; Yume Kiriishi; Haruka Agatsuma; Hotaru Tsukamoto; Miu Goto

== Results ==
=== Men's tournament ===
==== Preliminary round ====
===== Group A =====
Pos	Team	Pld	W	D	L	GF	GA	GD	Pts	Qualification
1	Japan	3	3	0	0	25	10	+15	6	Semifinals
2	Venezuela	3	2	0	1	17	13	+4	4	Semifinals
3	Argentina	3	1	0	2	14	10	+4	2	5th–8th Classification
4	Czech Republic	3	0	0	3	3	26	−23	0	5th–8th Classification

Source: TWG 2025

===== Group B =====
Pos	Team	Pld	W	D	L	GF	GA	GD	Pts	Qualification
1	United States	3	3	0	0	35	8	+27	6	Semifinals
2	Canada	3	2	0	1	23	16	+7	4	Semifinals
3	Singapore	3	1	0	2	20	33	−13	2	5th–8th Classification
4	Australia	3	0	0	3	14	35	−21	0	5th–8th Classification

Source: TWG 2025

==== Classification stage ====
===== Bracket =====
5th–8th Classification
August 9 – Chengdu
Czech Republic	15
Singapore	10
August 9 – Chengdu
Australia	1
Argentina	12

Fifth place play-off
August 9 – Chengdu
Czech Republic	0
Argentina	3
Seventh place play-off
August 9 – Chengdu
Singapore	5
Australia	12

==== Knockout stage ====
===== Bracket =====
Semi-finals
August 9 – Chengdu
Canada	1
Japan	6
August 9 – Chengdu
Venezuela	0
United States	7

Gold medal match
August 9 – Chengdu
Japan	X
United States	X
Bronze medal match
August 9 – Chengdu
Canada	X
Venezuela	X

A rainout was declared cancelling the gold and bronze medal matches. The winning semifinalists were awarded gold medals while the losers were given bronze medals.

==== Final standings ====
Rank	Team
1st place, gold medalist(s)	Japan
1st place, gold medalist(s)	United States
3rd place, bronze medalist(s)	Canada
3rd place, bronze medalist(s)	Venezuela
5	Argentina
6	Czech Republic
7	Australia
8	Singapore

=== Women's tournament ===
==== Preliminary round ====
===== Group A =====
Pos	Team	Pld	W	D	L	GF	GA	GD	Pts	Qualification
1	United States	3	3	0	0	20	2	+18	6	Semifinals
2	Chinese Taipei	3	2	0	1	10	5	+5	4	Semifinals
3	Netherlands	3	1	0	2	4	11	−7	2	5th–8th Classification
4	China (H)	3	0	0	3	3	19	−16	0	5th–8th Classification

Source: TWG 2025
(H) Hosts

===== Group B =====
Pos	Team	Pld	W	D	L	GF	GA	GD	Pts	Qualification
1	Canada	3	3	0	0	22	10	+12	6	Semifinals
2	Japan	3	2	0	1	18	5	+13	4	Semifinals
3	Australia	3	1	0	2	12	20	−8	2	5th–8th Classification
4	Puerto Rico	3	0	0	3	10	27	−17	0	5th–8th Classification

Source: TWG 2025

==== Classification stage ====
===== Bracket =====
5th–8th Classification
August 16 – Chengdu
Australia	3
China	4
August 16 – Chengdu
Netherlands	1
Puerto Rico	3

Fifth place play-off
August 16 – Chengdu
China	X
Puerto Rico	X
Seventh place play-off
August 16 – Chengdu
Australia	X
Netherlands	X

The play-offs for fifth place and seventh place were cancelled due to rain. The final standings including the 5th to 8th place teams were later confirmed.

==== Knockout stage ====
===== Bracket =====
Semi-finals
August 16 – Chengdu
United States	7
Japan	6
August 16 – Chengdu
Canada	4
Chinese Taipei	6

Gold medal match
August 16 – Chengdu
United States	5
Chinese Taipei	0
Bronze medal match
August 16 – Chengdu
Japan	11
Canada	1

==== Final standings ====
Rank	Team
1st place, gold medalist(s)	United States
2nd place, silver medalist(s)	Chinese Taipei
3rd place, bronze medalist(s)	Japan
4	Canada
5	Australia
6	Puerto Rico
7	Netherlands
8	China
