= Venezuela at the 2025 World Games =

- IOC code: VEN
- NOC: Venezuelan Olympic Committee

in Chengdu, China 7 August 2025 – 17 August 2025
- Competitors: 27 (19 men and 8 women) in 6 sports and 20 events
- Medals Ranked 67th: Gold 0 Silver 1 Bronze 1 Total 2

World Games appearances
- 1981; 1985; 1989; 1993; 1997; 2001; 2005; 2009; 2013; 2017; 2022; 2025

Venezuela competed at the 2025 World Games held in Chengdu, China from 7 to 17 August 2025.

Athletes representing Venezuela won one silver medal and one bronze medal. The country finished in 67th place in the medal table.

== Medalists ==
Medal	Name	Sport	Event	Date
Silver	Luisaigna Campos	Sambo	Women's combat 54 kg	14 August
Bronze	Pedro Flores; Alfredo Aguilar; Luis Colombo; Jean Flores; Franklin Benitez; Engelbert Herrera; Eudomar Toyo; Edruin Ramirez; Kleiver Rodríguez; Maiker Pimentel; Angel Adames; Jose Dorantes; Rogelio Sequera; Erwin Diaz; Rafael Flores	Softball	Men's tournament	10 August

== Competitors ==
The following is the list of number of competitors in the Games.

Sport	Men	Women	Total
Aikido^{D}	1	0	1
Baseball	15	0	15
Karate	0	1	1
Road speed skating	0	2	2
Sambo	3	3	6
Triathlon	0	2	2
Total	19	8	27

D: Demonstration sport; no medal events were held.

== Baseball ==
Men

Team	Event	Group play				Semifinal	Final / BM	
Team	Event	Opposition Result	Opposition Result	Opposition Result	Rank	Opposition Result	Opposition Result	Rank
Venezuela men	Men's tournament	Argentina (ARG) W 2–3	Japan (JPN) L 3–10	Czech Republic (CZE) W 11–1	2	United States (USA) L 0–7	Canada (CAN) Cancelled	3rd place, bronze medalist(s)
