= 2022 Racquetball World Championships =

Racquetball competition in Mexico

- XXI Racquetball World Championships: 2022 -
Host	(Mexico) San Luis Potosí
Dates	August 20–27, 2022
- Men's singles
Gold	(Bolivia) Conrrado Moscoso
Silver	(United States) Rocky Carson
Bronze	(Mexico) Rodrigo Montoya (Costa Rica) Andrés Acuña
- Women's singles
Gold	(Mexico) Paola Longoria
Silver	(Guatemala) Gabriela Martínez
Bronze	(Bolivia) Angélica Barrios (Mexico) Alexandra Herrera
- Men's doubles
Gold	(Mexico) Álvaro Beltrán & Daniel de la Rosa
Silver	(Bolivia) Roland Keller & Conrrado Moscoso
Bronze	(United States) Charlie Pratt & Sam Bredenbeck (Canada) Coby Iwaasa & Samuel Murray
- Women's doubles
Gold	(Mexico) Paola Longoria & Samantha Salas
Silver	(Argentina) Valeria Centellas & Natalia Mendez
Bronze	(Guatemala) María Renée Rodríguez & Gabriela Martínez (Canada) Frédérique Lambert & Michèle Morissette
- Mixed doubles
Gold	(Mexico) Rodrigo Montoya & Samantha Salas
Silver	(Canada) Frédérique Lambert & Samuel Murray
Bronze	(Argentina) Valeria Centellas & Diego Garcia (Bolivia) Jenny Daza & Conrrado Moscoso

The International Racquetball Federation's 21st Racquetball World Championships were held at the La Loma Centro Deportivo in San Luis Potosí, Mexico from August 20–27, 2022.

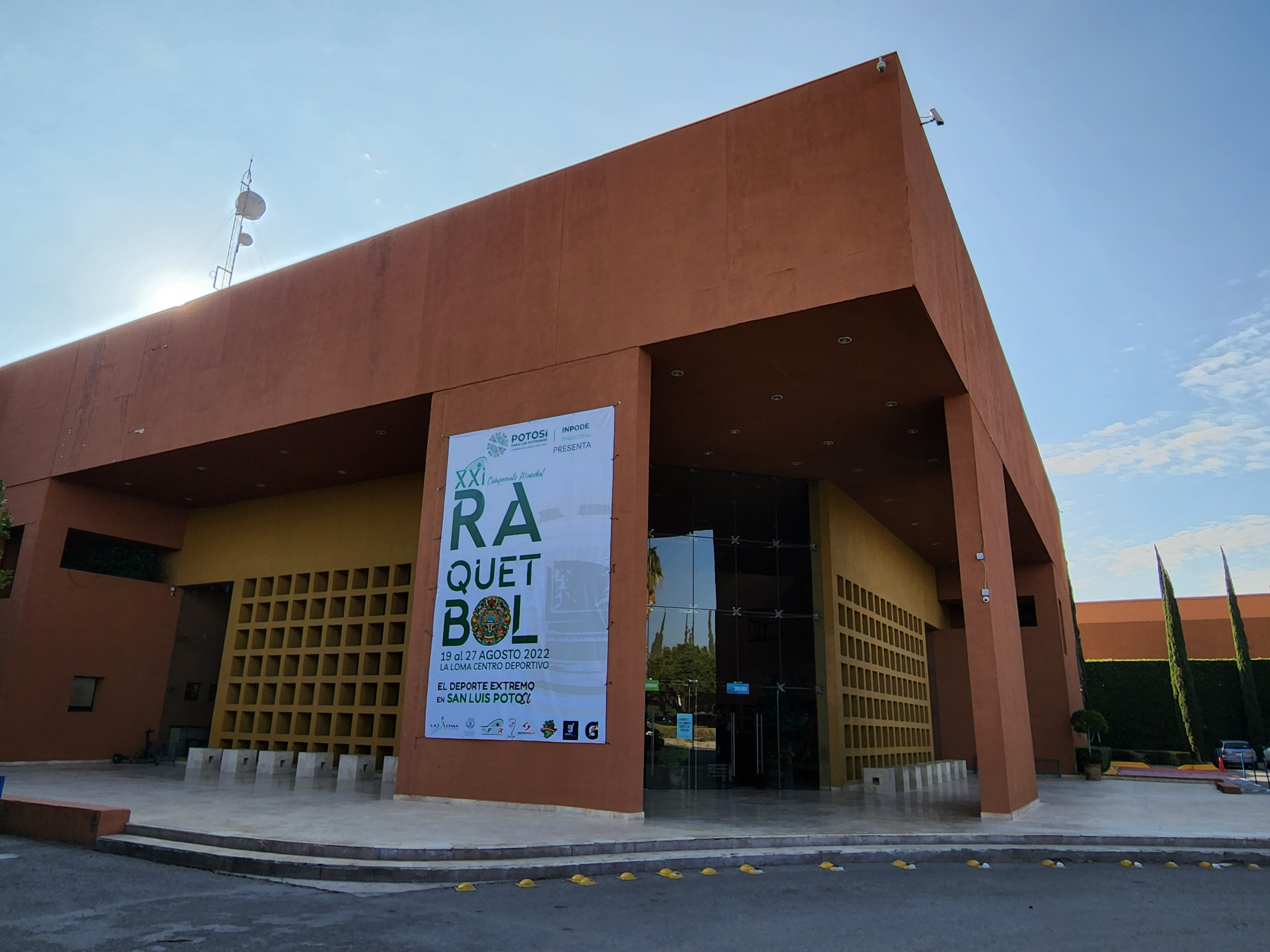
La Loma Centro Deportivo, San Luis Potosí, Mexico

== Tournament format ==
The 2022 World Championships used a two-stage format to determine the World Champions. Initially, players competed in separate groups over three days. The results were used to seed players for an elimination round. The individual events were followed by a team competition with countries competing head to head in best of three matches: two singles matches and a doubles match.

== Medal table ==
* Host nation (Mexico)

Rank	Nation	Gold	Silver	Bronze	Total
1	Mexico (MEX)*	4	0	2	6
2	Bolivia (BOL)	1	1	2	4
3	Canada (CAN)	0	1	2	3
4	Argentina (ARG)	0	1	1	2
4	Guatemala (GUA)	0	1	1	2
4	United States (USA)	0	1	1	2
7	Costa Rica (CRC)	0	0	1	1
Totals (7 entries)		5	5	10	20

== Individual events ==
=== Men's singles ===
Semifinals
(United States) Rocky Carson	8	7	11	12	11
(Costa Rica) Andrés Acuña	11	11	7	10	4
(Bolivia) Conrrado Moscoso	11	11	11
(Mexico) Rodrigo Montoya	4	2	6

Final
(United States) Rocky Carson	11	7	4	8
(Bolivia) Conrrado Moscoso	8	11	11	11

=== Women's singles ===
Semifinals
(Bolivia) Angélica Barrios	9	11	5	4
(Mexico) Paola Longoria	11	8	11	11
(Guatemala) Gabriela Martínez	12	11	11
(Mexico) Alexandra Herrera	10	6	9

Final
(Mexico) Paola Longoria	12	11	11
(United States) Gabriela Martínez	10	7	7

=== Men's doubles ===
Semifinals
(Mexico) Álvaro Beltrán & Daniel de la Rosa	12	11	11
(United States) Charlie Pratt & Sam Bredenbeck	10	9	7
(Canada) Coby Iwaasa & Samuel Murray	8	6	11	9
(Bolivia) Roland Keller & Conrrado Moscoso	11	11	1	11

Final
(Mexico) Álvaro Beltrán & Daniel de la Rosa	7	12	11	11	11
(Bolivia) Roland Keller & Conrrado Moscoso	11	14	7	5	6

=== Women's doubles ===
Semifinals
(Mexico) Paola Longoria & Samantha Salas	11	12	11
(Guatemala) María Renée Rodríguez & Ana Gabriela Martínez	4	10	9
(Argentina) Valeria Centellas & Natalia Méndez	11	11	11
(Canada) Frédérique Lambert & Michèle Morissette	6	4	2

Final
(Mexico) Paola Longoria & Samantha Salas	11	15	11	9	12
(Argentina) Valeria Centellas & Natalia Méndez	6	17	9	11	10

=== Mixed doubles ===
Semifinals
(Mexico) Rodrigo Montoya & Samantha Salas	11	11	11
(Argentina) Valeria Centellas & Diego Garcia	7	9	7
(Canada) Frédérique Lambert & Samuel Murray	11	11	12
(Bolivia) Jenny Daza & Conrrado Moscoso	9	9	10

Final
(Mexico) Rodrigo Montoya & Samantha Salas	11	9	11	11
(Canada) Frédérique Lambert & Samuel Murray	3	11	8	9

== Team events ==
The team competition occurred after the individual events, and results from those events were used to seed countries for the team event. The team competition was a best of three matches: two singles and a doubles match. The order of the matches varied by round.

=== Men's team ===
First round
9	Argentina
8	Japan
5	Ecuador
12	India
11	Chile
6	Guatemala
7	Costa Rica
10	Cuba

Quarterfinals
Bolivia
Argentina
Ecuador
Canada
USA
Guatemala
Cuba
Mexico

Semifinals
Bolivia	0	2
Canada	3	3
USA	0	3	0
Mexico	3	2	3

Final
Canada	2	2
Mexico	3	3

Semi-finals

26 August 2022	BOL	0–2	Canada

Roland Keller	0–3	Coby Iwaasa
Roland Keller / Conrrado Moscoso	2–3	Coby Iwaasa / Samuel Murray

26 August 2022	USA	1–2	Mexico

Alejandro Landa	0–3	Rodrigo Montoya
Sam Bredenbeck / Charlie Pratt	3–2	Álvaro Beltrán / Daniel de la Rosa
Rocky Carson	0–3	Daniel de la Rosa

Final

27 August 2022	CAN	0–2	Mexico

Coby Iwaasa	2–3	Rodrigo Montoya	11-7, 9-11, 3-11, 11-6, 11-4
Samuel Murray	2–3	Daniel de la Rosa	9-11, 6-11, 11-7, 11-8, 11-7

=== Women's team ===
First round
9	Colombia
8	Chile
7	Canada
10	Japan

Quarterfinals
Mexico
Colombia
Guatemala
(United States) USA
Bolivia
Ecuador
Canada
Argentina

Semifinals
Mexico	3	3
USA	0	2
Bolivia	0	3	0
Argentina	3	2	3

Final
Mexico	0	3	3
Bolivia	3	0	0

Semi-finals

26 August 2022	MEX	2–0	United States

Alexandra Herrera	3–0	Rhonda Rajsich
Paola Longoria / Samantha Salas	3–2	Kelani Lawrence / Hollie Scott

26 August 2022	BOL	2–0	Argentina

Angélica Barrios
Angélica Barrios / Jenny Daza

Valeria Centellas
Valeria Centellas / Natalia Mendez

Final

27 August 2022	MEX	2–1	Bolivia

Alexandra Herrera	0–3	Angélica Barrios	11-6, 11-6, 11-7
Paola Longoria	3–0	Jenny Daza	11–4, 11–8, 11–6
Paola Longoria / Samantha Salas	3–0	Angélica Barrios / Jenny Daza	11-4, 11-7, 11-3

=== Overall team standings ===
Place	Country
1	Mexico
2	Bolivia
3	United States
4	Canada
