= Parkour at the 2025 World Games =

- Venue: Xinglong Lake
- Dates: 12–13 August 2025
- No. of events: 4
- Competitors: 24 from 18 nations

The parkour competition at the 2025 World Games took place from 12 to 13 August 2025 at the Xinglong Lake in Chengdu, China. The discipline included four events (two for men and two for women).

== Qualification ==
A total of 24 athletes qualified for the events (12 men and 12 women). The 2024 Parkour World Championships served as the main qualifying event, providing with half of spots for each event. The remaining spots came as wildcards.

== Participating nations ==
- Argentina (1)
- Australia (1)
- Austria (1)
- Bulgaria (1)
- China (2)
- Colombia (1)
- Czech Republic (2)
- France (1)
- Italy (1)
- Japan (2)
- Mexico (2)
- Netherlands (2)
- Slovakia (1)
- Spain (1)
- Sweden (1)
- Switzerland (1)
- Thailand (1)
- United States (2)

== Medal table ==
* Host nation (China)

Rank	Nation	Gold	Silver	Bronze	Total
1	Japan	1	1	0	2
2	China*	1	0	0	1
2	Sweden	1	0	0	1
2	Switzerland	1	0	0	1
5	Czech Republic	0	1	0	1
5	France	0	1	0	1
5	Netherlands	0	1	0	1
8	Argentina	0	0	2	2
9	Italy	0	0	1	1
9	United States	0	0	1	1
Totals (10 entries)		4	4	4	12

== Events ==
=== Men ===
Event	Gold	Silver	Bronze
Speed	Caryl Cordt-Moeller; Switzerland	Jaroslav Chum; Czech Republic	Andrea Consolini; Italy
Freestyle	Mutsuhiro Shiohata; Japan	Eloan Hitz; France	Shea Rudolph; United States

=== Women ===
Event	Gold	Silver	Bronze
Speed	Miranda Tibbling; Sweden	Noa Man; Netherlands	Sara Banchoff Tzancoff; Argentina
Freestyle	Shang Chunsong; China	Nene Nagai; Japan	Sara Banchoff Tzancoff; Argentina
