= Powerlifting at the 2025 World Games =

Sports competition

- Venue: Chengdu High-Tech Zone Sports Center
- Dates: 14–17 August
- No. of events: 16
- Competitors: 119 from 36 nations

The powerlifting competition at the 2025 World Games took place from 14 to 17 August 2025, in Chengdu in China. This was the first time, when classic (raw) powerlifting is one of the official sports at the World Games.

== Qualification ==
A total of eight athletes qualified for each event. Six spots came from the 2024 IPF Open World Classic Powerlifting Championships and 2024 IPF Open World Equipped Powerlifting Championships, with the remaining two being wildcards.

== Participating nations ==
- Australia (1)
- Belgium (1)
- Brazil (1)
- Canada (8)
- Chile (1)
- Chinese Taipei (8)
- Denmark (1)
- Ecuador (5)
- Finland (1)
- France (9)
- Georgia (1)
- Germany (2)
- Great Britain (6)
- Hungary (2)
- Italy (5)
- Japan (4)
- Lebanon (1)
- Luxembourg (1)
- Mexico (1)
- Mongolia (1)
- Nauru (1)
- Netherlands (1)
- New Zealand (4)
- Norway (8)
- Philippines (2)
- Poland (2)
- Puerto Rico (1)
- Singapore (2)
- South Africa (2)
- Spain (2)
- Sweden (6)
- Thailand (1)
- Tunisia (1)
- Ukraine (13)
- United States (12)
- Virgin Islands (1)

== Medallists ==
=== Classic ===
==== Men ====
Event	Gold	Silver	Bronze
Lightweight	Joseph Jordan; Virgin Islands	Kyota Ushiyama; Japan	Clifton Pho; Canada
Middleweight	Jurins Kengamu; Great Britain	Enahoro Asein; Hungary	Kjell Egil Bakkelund; Norway
Heavyweight	Anatolii Novopysmennyi; Ukraine	Gustav Hedlund; Sweden	Emil Norling; Sweden
Super heavyweight	Temur Samkharadze; Georgia	Etienne El Chaer; Lebanon	Nicolas Peyraud; France

==== Women ====
Event	Gold	Silver	Bronze
Lightweight	Tiffany Chapon; France	Megan-Li Smith; New Zealand	Evie Corrigan; New Zealand
Middleweight	Alba Boström; Sweden	Sara Naldi; Italy	Joy Nnamani; Great Britain
Heavyweight	Karlina Tongotea; New Zealand	Carola Garra; Italy	Marte Kjenner; Norway
Super heavyweight	Brittany Schlater; Canada	Sonita Muluh; Belgium	Natalie Laalaai; Australia

=== Equipped ===
==== Men ====
Event	Gold	Silver	Bronze
Lightweight	Yusuke Satake; Japan	Tsung-Ting Hsieh; Chinese Taipei	Hassan El Belghiti; France
Middleweight	Kai-Chieh Chiang; Chinese Taipei	Vitalii Kolomiiets; Ukraine	Mykola Barannik; Ukraine
Heavyweight	Kostiantyn Musiienko; Ukraine	Volodymyr Rysiev; Ukraine	Ian Bell; United States
Super heavyweight	Sen Yang; Chinese Taipei	Jared Martin; United States	Oleksii Bychkov; Ukraine

==== Women ====
Event	Gold	Silver	Bronze
Lightweight	Zuzanna Kula; Poland	Tetiana Bila; Ukraine	Anastasiia Derevianko; Ukraine
Middleweight	Taylor LaChapelle; United States	Larysa Soloviova; Ukraine	Alessandra Cernigliaro; Italy
Heavyweight	Marte Elverum; Norway	Kelsey McCarthy; United States	Matilda Vilmar; Sweden
Super heavyweight	Rhaea Stinn; Canada	Daria Rusanenko; Ukraine	Mary Krebs; United States
