= Georgia at the 2025 World Games =

- IOC code: GEO
- NOC: Georgian National Olympic Committee

in Chengdu, China 7 August 2025 – 17 August 2025
- Competitors: 1 (1 man and 0 women) in 1 sport and 1 event
- Medals Ranked 49th: Gold 1 Silver 0 Bronze 0 Total 1

World Games appearances
- 1981; 1985; 1989; 1993; 1997; 2001; 2005; 2009; 2013; 2017; 2022; 2025

Georgia competed at the 2025 World Games held in Chengdu, China from 7 to 17 August 2025.

Georgia is only represented by one athlete, and he won one gold medal. The country finished in 51st place in the medal table.

== Competitors ==
The following is the list of number of competitors in the Games.

Sport	Men	Women	Total
Powerlifting	1	0	1
Total	1	0	1

== Medalists ==
Medal	Name	Sport	Event	Date
Gold	Temur Samkharadze	Powerlifting	Men's Super heavyweight	15 August

== Powerlifting ==
Classic

Athlete	Event	Exercises			Total weight	Total points	Rank
Athlete	Event	Squat	Bench press	Deadlift	Total weight	Total points	Rank
Temur Samkharadze	Men's Super Heavyweight	370.0	225.0	395.0	990.0	110.93	1st place, gold medalist(s)
