= Racquetball at the 2025 World Games – Men's singles =

Racquetball – Men's singles at the 2025 World Games
- Venue: Chengdu High-Tech Zone Sports Center, Chengdu, China
- Dates: 13–17 August
- Competitors: 16 from 16 nations

Medalists
gold medal	Conrrado Moscoso	Bolivia
silver medal	Diego García	Argentina
bronze medal	Eduardo Portillo	Mexico

The men's singles event in racquetball at the 2025 World Games took place from 13 to 17 August 2025 at the Chengdu High-Tech Zone Sports Center in Chengdu, China.

== Competition format ==
A total of 16 athletes from 16 different countries competed in a single-elimination tournament in Chengdu.

== Summary ==
Bolivian Conrrado Moscoso won gold in Chengdu, as he defeated Argentina's Diego Garcia in the final. Moscoso's and Garcia's medals are the first World Games medals in racquetball for their respective countries. Mexican Eduardo Portillo defeated Guatemalan Edwin Galicia to win the bronze medal. Portillo's bronze medal is the second consecutive World Games bronze for Mexico (Andree Parrilla won bronze at the 2022 World Games) and sixth Mexican medal overall.

== Results ==
Round of 16
1	J Bredenbeck (USA)	11	11	11
16	H-y Huang (TPE)	2	3	3
9	J Ugalde (ECU)	11	11	9	3
8	E Galicia (GUA)	4	13	11	11
5	A Acuña (CRC)	11	11	11
12	Lee G-h (KOR)	4	1	2
13	J O'Keeney (IRL)	6	2	3
4	D García (ARG)	11	11	11
3	C Moscoso (BOL)	11	11	11
14	M Lunsmann (GER)	4	7	5
11	R de León (DOM)	11	11	9	2	2
6	C Iwaasa (CAN)	9	5	11	11	11
7	J Kosetty (IND)	4	1	4
10	M Kono (JPN)	11	11	11
15	C Papini (ITA)	1	4	3
2	E Portillo (MEX)	11	11	11

Quarter-finals
1	J Bredenbeck (USA)	9	11	7	6
8	E Galicia (GUA)	11	9	11	11
5	A Acuña (CRC)	6	8	6
4	D García (ARG)	11	11	11
3	C Moscoso (BOL)	12	8	11	11
6	C Iwaasa (CAN)	10	11	1	5
10	M Kono (JPN)	5	6	9
2	E Portillo (MEX)	11	11	11

Semi-finals
8	E Galicia (GUA)	10	4	9
4	D García (ARG)	12	11	11
3	C Moscoso (BOL)	11	11	9	11
2	E Portillo (MEX)	4	3	11	6

Final
4	D García (ARG)	11	2	9	11	12
3	C Moscoso (BOL)	9	11	11	6	14
Third place
8	E Galicia (GUA)	17	9	12	11	9
2	E Portillo (MEX)	19	11	10	8	11

== See also ==
- Racquetball at the 2025 World Games - Women's singles
- Racquetball at the 2025 World Games - Doubles
