= Ireland at the 2025 World Games =

- IOC code: IRL
- NOC: Irish Olympic Association

in Chengdu, China 7 August 2025 – 17 August 2025
- Competitors: 16 (3 men and 13 women) in 4 sports and 7 events
- Medals: Gold 0 Silver 0 Bronze 0 Total 0

World Games appearances
- 1981; 1985; 1989; 1993; 1997; 2001; 2005; 2009; 2013; 2017; 2022; 2025

Ireland will compete at the 2025 World Games held in Chengdu, China from 7 to 17 August 2025.

== Competitors ==
The following is the list of number of competitors in the Games.

Sport	Men	Women	Total
Canoe marathon	1	0	1
Kickboxing	1	0	1
Lacrosse	0	12	12
Racquetball	1	1	2
Total	3	13	16

== Canoe Marathon ==
Athlete	Event	Final	
Athlete	Event	Time	Rank
Paul Donnellan	Men's K-1 short distance	14:48.81	13
Paul Donnellan	Men's K-1 long distance	1:45:37.80	17

== Kickboxing ==
Athlete	Event	Quarterfinal	Semifinal	Final / BM	
Athlete	Event	Opposition Result	Opposition Result	Opposition Result	Rank
Gareth Ryan	Men's 84kg	(Mexico) Solorio L 14-22	Did Not Advance		=5

== Lacrosse ==
Summary

Team	Event	Preliminary round				7th Place Game	
Team	Event	Opposition Result	Opposition Result	Opposition Result	Rank	Opposition Result	Rank
Ireland women	Women's tournament	United States L 11–32	Czech Republic L 10–16	Australia L 7–18	4	China W 19–5	7

== Racquetball ==
Athlete	Event	Round of 16	Quarterfinal	Semifinal	Final / BM	
Athlete	Event	Opposition Result	Opposition Result	Opposition Result	Opposition Result	Rank
Jonathan O'Keeney	Men's singles	(Argentina) García L 3-0	Did Not Advance			=9
Aisling Hickey	Women's singles	(Bolivia) Barrios L 3-0	Did Not Advance			=9
Jonathan O'Keeney; Aisling Hickey	Double	(Canada) Iwaasa / Lambert L 3-0	Did Not Advance			=9
