= Racquetball at the 2025 World Games – Mixed doubles =

Racquetball – Doubles at the 2025 World Games
- Venue: Chengdu High-Tech Zone Sports Center, Chengdu, China
- Dates: 14–17 August
- Competitors: 32 from 16 nations

Medalists
gold medal	Jake Bredenbeck; Naomi Ros	United States
silver medal	Diego García; María José Vargas	Argentina
bronze medal	Coby Iwaasa; Frédérique Lambert	Canada

The doubles event in racquetball at the 2025 World Games will take place from 14 to 17 August 2025 at the Chengdu High-Tech Zone Sports Center in Chengdu, China. This the inaugural Mixed doubles event at the World Games, and the first doubles event in racquetball of any sort since the 1981 World Games.

== Competition format ==
A total of 32 athletes from 16 different countries competed in a single-elimination tournament in Chengdu.

== Summary ==
Americans Jake Bredenbeck and Naomi Ros won gold by defeating Argentina's María José Vargas and Diego Garcia in the final. The Americans' medal is the first gold medal for the USA since the 2009 World Games, when Jack Huczek won gold in Men's Singles, and the first of any kind since the 2013 World Games, when Rocky Carson and Rhonda Rajsich were both bronze medalists in Men's and Women's Singles, respectively. Vargas's and Garcia's silver medals were their 2nd medals of the Games, as Vargas won gold in singles and Garcia silver. Canadians Coby Iwaasa and Frédérique Lambert defeated Japan's Michimune Kono and Harumi Kajino to win the bronze medal, and that's Canada's first medal at the World Games since the 2009 World Games, when Vincent Gagnon won bronze in Men's Singles.

== Results ==
Round of 16
Bredenbeck / Ros (USA)	11	11	11
Huang H-y / Wang Y (TPE)	3	2	3
Acuña / Larissa (CRC)	11	9	11	11
de León / Céspedes (DOM)	9	11	6	7
Iwaasa / Lambert (CAN)	11	11	12
O'Keeney / Hickey (IRL)	1	5	10
Papini / Amaya (ITA)	0	1	1
Galicia / Martínez (GUA)	11	11	11
Moscoso / Barrios (BOL)	11	11	11
Lunsmann / Grisar (GER)	8	7	6
Kono / Kajino (JPN)	11	11	11
Lee G-h / Lee S-m (KOR)	2	9	5
García / Vargas (ARG)	11	11	11
Ugalde / Villacreses (ECU)	7	5	10
Kosetty / Dalvi (IND)	3	0	1
Portillo / Longoria (MEX)	11	11	11

Quarter-finals
Bredenbeck / Ros (USA)	11	11	11
A Acuña / MJ Céspedes (CRC)	7	6	5
C Iwaasa / F Lambert (CAN)	11	9	11	11
Galicia / Martínez (GUA)	9	11	4	8
Moscoso / Barrios (BOL)
Kono / Kajino (JPN)	w/o
García / Vargas (ARG)	11	11	11
Portillo / Longoria (MEX)	9	8	4

Semi-finals
Bredenbeck / Ros (USA)	9	11	8	11	11
Iwaasa / Lambert (CAN)	11	5	11	9	9
Kono / Kajino (JPN)	4	7	7
García / Vargas (ARG)	11	11	11

Final
Bredenbeck / Ros (USA)	11	11	11
García / Vargas (ARG)	7	9	6
Third place
Iwaasa / Lambert (CAN)	11	11	7	11
Kono / Kajino (JPN)	3	7	11	4

== See also ==
- Racquetball at the 2025 World Games - Men's singles
- Racquetball at the 2025 World Games - Women's singles
