= 2023 Pan American Racquetball Championships =

The 2023 Pan American Championships were held in Guatemala City, Guatemala, April 1–8. Bolivian Conrrado Moscoso won Men's Singles for the second consecutive year, and Montserrat Mejia won Women's Singles for the first time. Moscoso's win was the fourth consecutive Bolivian gold in Men's Singles, as Carlos Keller won the two events prior to Moscoso. Mejia is the second Mexican woman to win Women's Singles after Paola Longoria.

Mejia also won Women's Doubles with Alexandra Herrera, with fellow Mexicans Rodrigo Montoya and Eduardo Portillo winning Men's Doubles. Meija is the 3rd women to win both Women's Singles and Doubles in the same year after Longoria (4 times) and American Rhonda Rajsich (once). Moscoso won the Mixed Doubles title with Angélica Barrios, so he is the first player to win singles, doubles and mixed doubles at the Pan American Championships.

The 2023 Pan American Championships were the qualifying event for the 2023 Pan American Games in Santiago, Chile, so players played for all of the places from first on down. The top 10 men's and women's teams qualified for the Pan American Games with the top three teams plus Chile, as the host nation, allowed to send 3 athletes to Chile, and the other six nations allowed to send 2 athletes, so a total of 24 men and 24 women will compete in racquetball in Chile.

Because of the time needed to complete the Pan Am Games qualifying, there was no Team competition this year's Pan American Championships.

Some of the matches, including all of the finals, from Guatemala were covered on the PanAm Sports Channel.

== Tournament format ==
The competition had five events: Men's and Women's Singles and Doubles and Mixed Doubles. Each individual event had a group stage followed by a medal round. The results of the group stage were used to seed players for the medal round. The group stage began April 1 and concluded April 3. The medal round began April 4 and concluded April 8.

== Participating nations ==
A total of 63 athletes (34 men & 29 women) from 14 countries participated.

- Argentina (5)
- Bolivia (6)
- Canada (6)
- Chile (5)
- Colombia (4)
- Costa Rica (4)
- Dominican Republic (2)
- Ecuador (2)
- Guatemala (6)
- Mexico (6)
- Puerto Rico (1)
- United States (6)

== Medal summary ==
=== Medal table ===
Rank	Nation	Gold	Silver	Bronze	Total
1	Mexico (MEX)	3	1	0	4
2	Bolivia (BOL)	2	2	1	5
3	Argentina (ARG)	0	1	4	5
4	Guatemala (GUA)	0	1	0	1
5	United States (USA)	0	0	3	3
6	Costa Rica (CRC)	0	0	2	2
Totals (6 entries)		5	5	10	20

=== Medalists ===
Event	Gold	Silver	Bronze
Men's events
Singles	Conrrado Moscoso; Bolivia	Carlos Keller; Bolivia	Jake Bredenbeck; United States Diego García; Argentina
Doubles	Rodrigo Montoya; Eduardo Portillo; Mexico	Kadim Carrasco; Conrrado Moscoso; Bolivia	Jake Bredenbeck; Sam Bredenbeck; United States Andrés Acuña; Gabriel Garcia; Costa Rica
Women's events
Singles	Montserrat Mejia; Mexico	María José Vargas; Argentina	Natalia Mendez; Argentina Maricruz Ortiz; Costa Rica
Doubles	Montserrat Mejia; Alexandra Herrera; Mexico	Gabriela Martinez; Maria Renee Rodriguez; Guatemala	Natalia Mendez; Maria Jose Vargas; Argentina Angélica Barrios; Jenny Daza; Bolivia
Mixed events
Doubles	Angélica Barrios; Conrrado Moscoso; Bolivia	Rodrigo Montoya; Paola Longoria; Mexico	Maria Jose Vargas; Diego García; Argentina Sam Bredenbeck; Michelle Key; United States

== Men's singles ==
=== Preliminary round ===
Group 1

Players	Pld	W	L	GW	GL	PW	PL	Rank
(Bolivia) Carlos Keller	2	2	0	6	2	85	76	1
(Argentina) Diego Garcia	2	1	1	4	3	68	63	2
(Guatemala) Edwin Galicia	2	0	2	1	6	65	79	3

Group 2

Players	Pld	W	L	GW	GL	PW	PL	Rank
(United States) Jake Bredenbeck	2	2	0	6	0	70	41	1
(Guatemala) Juan Salvatierra	2	1	1	3	3	55	62	2
(Argentina) Fernando Kurzbard	2	0	2	0	6	47	69	3

Group 3

Players	Pld	W	L	GW	GL	PW	PL	Rank
(Bolivia) Conrrado Moscoso	2	2	0	6	0	66	33	1
(Canada) Trevor Webb	2	1	1	3	3	127	101	5
(Dominican Republic) Ramón de León	2	0	2	0	6	49	70	3

Group 4

Players	Pld	W	L	GW	GL	PW	PL	Rank
(United States) Thomas Carter	3	3	0	9	0	99	39	1
(Ecuador) Jose Daniel Ugalde	3	2	1	6	3	78	59	2
(Colombia) Set Cubillos	3	1	2	3	6	60	81	3
(Honduras) Ronal Cardona	3	0	3	0	9	41	99	4

Group 5

Players	Pld	W	L	GW	GL	PW	PL	Rank
(Canada) Samuel Murray	3	0	3	9	1	104	62	1
(Costa Rica) Andrés Acuña	3	2	1	7	3	100	60	2
(Chile) Diego Gatica	3	1	2	3	6	23	66	3
(Puerto Rico) Abraham Mercado	3	0	3	0	9	27	66	4

Group 6

Players	Pld	W	L	GW	GL	PW	PL	Rank
(Mexico) Eduardo Portillo	3	3	0	9	1	110	56	1
(Ecuador) Juan Francisco Cueva	3	2	1	7	4	107	98	2
(Cuba) Maikel Moyet	3	1	2	3	6	77	92	3
(Honduras) Carlos Medrano	3	0	3	1	9	66	114	4

Group 6

Players	Pld	W	L	GW	GL	PW	PL	Rank
(Mexico) Andree Parrilla	3	3	0	9	0	102	52	1
(Costa Rica) Gabriel Garcia	3	2	1	6	3	85	65	2
(Cuba) Yandy Espinosa	3	1	2	3	7	67	97	3
(Chile) Rafael Gatica	3	0	3	1	9	68	108	4

=== Medal round ===
Round of 32
17	(Dominican Republic) Ramón de León	6	11	5	10
16	(Argentina) Fernando Kurzbard	11	2	11	12
9	(Costa Rica) Andrés Acuña	11	11	11
24	(Honduras) Carlos Medrano	6	8	2
25	(Honduras) Ronal Cardona	9	6	7
8	(Costa Rica) Gabriel Garcia	11	11	11
21	(Chile) Rafael Gatica	6	9	10
12	(Ecuador) Jose Daniel Ugalde	11	11	11
13	(Argentina) Diego Garcia	11	11	11
20	(Cuba) Maikel Moyet	9	5	4
19	(Chile) Diego Gatica	7	9	11	4
8	(Guatemala) Juan Salvatierra	11	11	9	11
11	(Canada) Trevor Webb	11	11	11
8	(Cuba) Yandy Espinosa	2	5	1
23	(Puerto Rico) Abraham Mercado	3	4	11	13	1
8	(Ecuador) Juan Francisco Cueva	11	11	6	11	11
9	(Guatemala) Edwin Galicia	11	11	11
8	(Colombia) Set Cubillos	4	4	7

Round of 16
1	(Bolivia) Carlos Keller	11	11	11
16	(Argentina) Fernando Kurzbard	9	9	6
9	(Costa Rica) Andrés Acuña	11	11	11
8	(Costa Rica) Gabriel Garcia	4	6	6
5	(Mexico) Eduardo Portillo	11	11	11
12	(Ecuador) Jose Daniel Ugalde	4	5	5
13	(Argentina) Diego Garcia	9	10	11	11	11
4	(United States) Thomas Carter	11	12	9	8	6
11	(Bolivia) Conrrado Moscoso	11	11	11
6	(Guatemala) Juan Salvatierra	7	7	5
11	(Canada) Trevor Webb	11	11	12
6	(Canada) Coby Iwaasa	5	9	10
7	(Mexico) Andree Parrilla	11	11	11
2	(Ecuador) Juan Francisco Cueva	3	7	3
15	(Guatemala) Edwin Galicia	11	8	11	4	5
2	(United States) Jake Bredenbeck	7	11	6	11	11

Quarterfinals
1	(Bolivia) Carlos Keller	6	11	12	11
14	(Costa Rica) Andrés Acuña	11	2	10	9
5	(Mexico) Eduardo Portillo	11	8	8	11	8
4	(Argentina) Diego Garcia	8	11	11	8	11
3	(Bolivia) Conrrado Moscoso	11	11	11
11	(Canada) Trevor Webb	7	4	8
7	(Mexico) Andree Parrilla	7	9	11	8
2	(United States) Jake Bredenbeck	11	11	8	11

Semifinals
1	(Bolivia) Carlos Keller	5	11	11	11	21
13	(Argentina) Diego Garcia	11	6	13	8	19
3	(Bolivia) Conrrado Moscoso	11	11	11
2	(United States) Jake Bredenbeck	6	7	3

Final
1	(Bolivia) Carlos Keller	8	9	9
3	(Bolivia) Conrrado Moscoso	11	11	11

Note: Samuel Murray was injured in the group stage in Canada's doubles match versus Mexico, so Coby Iwaasa was substituted for him in the singles medal round.

== Men's doubles ==
Group 1

Players	Pld	W	L	GW	GL	PW	PL	Rank
(Mexico) Rodrigo Montoya & Eduardo Portillo	2	2	0	5	2	80	56	1
(Canada) Coby Iwaasa & Samuel Murray	2	1	1	5	2	67	61	2
(Argentina) Fernando Kurzbard & Daniel Maggi	2	0	2	0	6	37	67	3

Note: Murray was injured in the 5th game of Canada's match versus Mexico, and Canada forfeited that match. Due to the injury, Trevor Webb was substituted for Murray in the medal round.

Group 2

Players	Pld	W	L	GW	GL	PW	PL	Rank
(Bolivia) Kadim Carrasco & Conrrado Moscoso	3	3	0	9	1	109	58	1
(United States) Jake Bredenbeck & Sam Bredenbeck	3	2	1	7	4	106	87	2
(Guatemala) Edwin Galicia & Christian Wer	3	1	2	4	6	82	99	3
(Honduras) Ronal Cardona & Eduardo Medrano	3	0	3	0	9	46	99	4

Group 3

Players	Pld	W	L	GW	GL	PW	PL	Rank
(Costa Rica) Andrés Acuña & Gabriel Garcia	3	3	0	9	3	129	84	1
(Ecuador) Juan Francisco Cueva & Jose Daniel Ugalde	3	2	1	7	3	95	85	2
(Cuba) Yandy Espinosa & Maikel Moyet	3	1	2	3	8	90	108	3
(Chile) Rafael Gatica & Rodrigo Salgado	3	0	3	4	9	98	135	4

=== Medal Round ===
First Round
9	(Cuba) Yandy Espinosa & Maikel Moyet	5	3	8
8	(Guatemala) Edwin Galicia & Christian Wer	11	11	11
11	(Honduras) Ronal Cardona & Carlos Medrano	5	6	2
6	(Canada) Coby Iwaasa & Trevor Webb	11	11	11
7	(Argentina) Fernando Kurzbard & Daniel Maggi	11	8	11	11
10	(Chile) Rafael Gatica & Rodrigo Salgado	8	11	9	9

Quarterfinals
1	(Mexico) Rodrigo Montoya & Eduardo Portillo	11	12	11
8	Guatemala	3	10	7
5	(United States) Jake Bredenbeck & Sam Bredenbeck	11	11	11
4	(Ecuador) Juan Francisco Cueva & Jose Daniel Ugalde	5	4	2
3	(Costa Rica) Andrés Acuña & Gabriel Garcia	11	11	14
6	(Canada) CANADA	3	2	12
7	Argentina	8	8	6
2	(Bolivia) Kadim Carrasco & Carlos Keller	11	11	11

Semifinals
1	(Mexico) MEXICO	11	11	11
5	(United States) USA	5	7	7
3	(Costa Rica) COSTA RICA	11	7	4	10
2	(Bolivia) BOLIVIA	8	11	11	12

Final
1	(Mexico) MEXICO	11	14	11	11
2	(Bolivia) BOLIVIA	3	12	13	8

== Women's singles ==
=== Preliminary round ===
Group 1

Players	Pld	W	L	GW	GL	PW	PL	Rank
(Bolivia) Angélica Barrios	2	2	0	6	0	68	39	1
(Chile) Carla Muñoz	2	1	1	3	3	57	54	2
(Guatemala) Anna Aguilar	2	0	2	0	6	35	67	3

Group 2

Players	Pld	W	L	GW	GL	PW	PL	Rank
(Argentina) Natalia Mendez	2	2	0	6	0	67	39	1
(Colombia) Cristina Amaya	2	1	1	3	3	57	51	2
(Ecuador) Maria José Muñoz	2	0	2	0	6	32	66	3

Group 3

Players	Pld	W	L	GW	GL	PW	PL	Rank
(Guatemala) Gabriela Martinez	3	3	0	9	0	99	37	1
(Bolivia) Yasmine Sabja	3	2	1	3	3	59	49	2
(Chile) Paula Mansilla	3	1	2	3	6	57	74	3
(Cuba) Samira Ferrer Marcilli	3	0	3	0	6	11	66	4

Group 4

Players	Pld	W	L	GW	GL	PW	PL	Rank
(Argentina) María José Vargas	3	3	0	9	1	108	53	1
(Ecuador) Maria Paz Muñoz	3	2	1	7	4	103	81	2
(Colombia) Maria Paz Riquelme	3	1	2	3	8	80	110	3
(Costa Rica) Jimena Gomez	3	0	3	3	9	76	123	4

Group 5

Players	Pld	W	L	GW	GL	PW	PL	Rank
(Mexico) Paola Longoria	3	3	0	9	0	99	44	1
(United States) Rhonda Rajsich	3	2	1	6	5	110	114	2
(Dominican Republic) Merynanyelly Delgado	3	1	2	5	8	118	138	3
(Canada) Juliette Parent	3	0	3	2	9	88	119	4

Group 6

Players	Pld	W	L	GW	GL	PW	PL	Rank
(Mexico) Montserrat Mejia	3	3	0	9	1	109	70	1
(United States) Erika Manilla	3	2	1	6	4	102	93	2
(Costa Rica) Maricruz Ortiz	3	1	2	5	6	97	95	3
(Canada) Michèle Morissette	3	0	3	0	9	50	100	4

=== Medal round ===
Round of 32
17	(Costa Rica) Maricruz Ortiz	11	11	11
16	(Chile) Paula Mansilla	5	3	6
21	(Canada) Juliette Parent	11	9	7	11	8
12	(United States) Rhonda Rajsich	9	11	11	9	11
13	(Ecuador) Maria José Muñoz	11	11	11
20	(Cuba) Samira Ferrera Marcilli	5	4	1
19	(Costa Rica) Jimena Gomez	10	6	7
14	(Guatemala) Anna Aguilar	12	11	11
11	(United States) Erika Manilla	11	11	11
22	(Canada) Michèle Morissette	7	7	5
15	(Colombia) Maria Paz Riquelme	11	6	6	2
18	(Dominican Republic) Merynanyelly Delgado	8	11	11	11

Round of 16
1	(Bolivia) Angélica Barrios	8	11	11	8
16	(Costa Rica) Maricruz Ortiz	11	9	13	11
9	(Costa Rica) Maria Paz Muñoz	9	3	4
8	(Colombia) Cristina Amaya	11	11	11
5	(Mexico) Paola Longoria	11	11	15
12	(United States) Rhonda Rajsich	5	5	13
13	(Ecuador) Maria José Muñoz	5	2	3
4	(Argentina) Maria Jose Vargas	11	11	11
3	(Guatemala) Gabriela Martinez	11	13	11
14	(Guatemala) Anna Aguilar	8	11	1
11	(United States) Erika Manilla	9	14	11	13
6	(Mexico) Montserrat Mejia	11	16	8	15
7	(Chile) Carla Muñoz	11	9	11	9	9
2	(Bolivia) Yasmine Sabja	6	11	6	11	11
18	(Dominican Republic) Merynanyelly Delgado	4	5	9
2	(Argentina) Natalia Mendez	11	11	11

Quarterfinals
17	(Costa Rica) Maricruz Ortiz	4	9	14	11	11
8	(Colombia) Cristina Amaya	11	11	12	8	4
5	(Mexico) Paola Longoria	5	11	11	8	5
4	(Argentina) Maria Jose Vargas	11	5	8	11	11
3	(Guatemala) Gabriela Martinez	13	6	9	7
6	(Mexico) Montserrat Mejia	11	11	11	11
10	(Bolivia) Yasmine Sabja	8	8	15	10
2	(Argentina) Natalia Mendez	11	11	13	12

Semifinals
1	(Costa Rica) Maricruz Ortiz	2	6	9
13	(Argentina) Maria Jose Vargas	11	11	11
3	(Mexico) Montserrat Mejia	11	11	8	11
2	(Argentina) Natalia Mendez	4	5	11	5

Final
4	(Argentina) Maria Jose Vargas	8	6	9
6	(Mexico) Montserrat Mejia	11	11	11

== Women's doubles ==
=== Preliminary round ===
Group 1

Players	Pld	W	L	GW	GL	PW	PL	Rank
(Guatemala) Gabriela Martinez & Maria Renee Rodriguez	2	2	0	6	1	74	60	1
(Argentina) Valeria Centellas & Natalia Méndez	2	1	1	4	3	66	59	2
(Canada) Michèle Morissette & Danielle Ramsay	2	0	2	0	6	46	67	3

Group 2

Players	Pld	W	L	GW	GL	PW	PL	Rank
(Mexico) Alexandra Herrera & Montserrat Mejia	2	2	0	6	1	76	48	1
(United States) Erika Manilla & Michelle Key	2	1	1	4	3	70	67	2
(Chile) Carla Muñoz & Paula Javiera Mansilla Sid	3	0	2	0	6	35	66	3

Group 3

Players	Pld	W	L	GW	GL	PW	PL	Rank
(Bolivia) Angélica Barrios & Jenny Daza	3	3	0	9	2	120	74	1
(Colombia) Cristina Amaya & Maria Paz Riquelme	3	2	1	7	4	93	102	2
(Ecuador) Maria José Muñoz & Ana Sarmiento	3	1	2	5	8	119	117	3
(Costa Rica) Maricruz Ortiz & Jimena Gomez	3	0	3	2	9	75	114	4

=== Medal round ===
Round of 16
9	(Costa Rica) Maricruz Ortiz & Jimena Gomez	8	9	12	12	6
8	(Chile) Carla Muñoz & Paula Javiera Mansilla Sid	11	11	10	10	11
1	(Canada) Michèle Morissette & Danielle Ramsay	14	9	9	11	9
6	(Ecuador) Maria José Muñoz & Ana Sarmiento	12	11	11	8	11

Quarterfinals
1	(Guatemala) Gabriela Martinez & Maria Renee Rodriguez	11	12	11
8	Chile	3	10	7
5	(United States) Erika Manilla & Michelle Key	5	7	7
4	(Bolivia) Angélica Barrios & Jenny Daza	11	11	11
3	(Colombia) Cristina Amaya & Maria Paz Riquelme	5	8	12
6	(Argentina) Valeria Centellas & Natalia Méndez	11	11	14
10	Ecuador	6	5	5
2	(Mexico) Alexandra Herrera & Montserrat Mejia	11	11	11

Semifinals
1	Guatemala	11	11	11
4	Bolivia	9	4	5
3	Argentina	9	8	4
2	Mexico	11	11	11

Final
1	Guatemala	6	6	10
2	Mexico	11	11	12

== Mixed doubles ==
Group 1

Players	Pld	W	L	GW	GL	PW	PL	Rank
(Mexico) Rodrigo Montoya & Paola Longoria	3	3	0	9	0	99	48	1
(Guatemala) Juan Salvatierra & Gabriela Martinez	3	2	1	6	4	97	80	2
(Canada) Coby Iwaasa & Danielle Ramsay	3	1	2	4	6	81	98	3
(Dominican Republic) Merynanyelly Delgado & Ramón de León	3	0	3	0	9	48	99	4

Group 2

Players	Pld	W	L	GW	GL	PW	PL	Rank
(Bolivia) Angélica Barrios & Conrrado Moscoso	3	3	0	9	2	116	79	1
(Chile) Jaime Mansilla & Carla Muñoz	3	2	1	6	4	100	77	2
(Costa Rica) Felipe Camacho & Maricruz Ortiz	3	1	2	6	6	102	110	3
(Cuba) Samira Ferrer Marcilli & Maikel Moyet	3	0	3	0	9	47	99	4

Group 3

Players	Pld	W	L	GW	GL	PW	PL	Rank
(Argentina) Diego Garcia & Maria Jose Vargas	3	3	0	9	1	110	78	1
(United States) Sam Bredenbeck & Michelle Key	3	2	1	7	5	133	118	2
(Ecuador) Juan Francisco Cueva & Maria Paz Muñoz	3	1	2	5	6	114	124	3
(Colombia) Cristina Amaya & Set Cubillos	3	0	3	0	9	66	103	4

=== Medal Round ===
Round of 16
9	(Colombia) Cristina Amaya & Set Cubillos	8	18	3	11	11
8	(Costa Rica) Felipe Camacho & Maricruz Ortiz	11	16	11	9	7
5	(Guatemala) Juan Salvatierra & Gabriela Martinez	11	11	11
12	(Cuba) Samira Ferrer Marcilli & Maikel Moyet	6	9	6
11	(Dominican Republic) Merynanyelly Delgado & Ramón de León	6	11	6	3
6	(Chile) Jaime Mansilla & Carla Muñoz	11	9	11	11
7	(Canada) Coby Iwaasa & Danielle Ramsay	7	11	11	5	9
10	(Ecuador) Juan Francisco Cueva & Maria Paz Muñoz	11	7	9	11	11

Quarterfinals
1	(Mexico) Rodrigo Montoya & Paola Longoria	11	11	9	11
8	Colombia	5	6	11	0
5	Guatemala	11	6	9	8
4	(Argentina) Diego Garcia & Maria Jose Vargas	8	11	11	11
3	(United States) Sam Bredenbeck & Michelle Key	13	11	6	11
6	(Chile) Carla Muñoz & Rodrigo Salgado Jr.	11	9	11	5
10	Ecuador	6	3	8
2	(Bolivia) Angélica Barrios & Conrrado Moscoso	11	11	11

Semifinals
1	Mexico	11	11	9	17
4	Argentina	3	6	11	15
3	(United States) USA	4	11	4	8
2	Bolivia	11	9	11	11

Final
1	Mexico	11	8	4	9
2	Bolivia	8	11	11	11

== 2023 Pan American Games Qualifying Playdowns ==
=== 3rd place ===
3rd place
(Argentina) Diego Garcia	0	0	0
(United States) Jake Bredenbeck	11	11	11

Note: Bredenbeck won by forfeit.

=== 5th-8th place ===
5-8 playoff
(Mexico) Eduardo Portillo	11	11	10	11
(Canada) Trevor Webb	5	5	12	2
(Costa Rica) Andrés Acuña	6	4	12	10
(Mexico) Andree Parrilla	11	11	10	12

5th place
(Mexico) Eduardo Portillo	0	0	0
(Mexico) Andree Parrilla	11	11	11
7th place
(Canada) Trevor Webb	9	5	10
(Costa Rica) Andrés Acuña	11	11	12

Note: Parrilla won by forfeit against Portillo.

=== 9th-16th place ===
9-16 playoff - First round
(United States) Thomas Carter	11	11	11
(Argentina) Fernando Kurzbard	7	6	7
(Ecuador) Jose Daniel Ugalde	11	11	11
(Ecuador) Juan Francisco Cueva	0	0	0
(Costa Rica) Gabriel Garcia	10	11	11	11
(Guatemala) Juan Salvatierra	12	8	4	9
(Guatemala) Edwin Galicia	7	6	5
(Canada) Coby Iwaasa	11	11	11

9-16 playoff - Second round
(United States) Thomas Carter	6	8	11	11	6
(Ecuador) Jose Daniel Ugalde	11	11	8	8	11
(Costa Rica) Gabriel Garcia	5	9	13
(Canada) Coby Iwaasa	11	11	15

9th place
(Ecuador) Jose Daniel Ugalde	5	11	11	4	4
(Canada) Coby Iwaasa	11	8	4	11	11
11th place
(United States) Thomas Carter	11	11	11
(Costa Rica) Gabriel Garcia	3	1	1

Note: Ugalde won by forfeit against Cueva.

13-16 playoff
(Ecuador) Juan Francisco Cueva	5	11
(Argentina) Fernando Kurzbard	11	4	injury forfeit
(Guatemala) Edwin Galicia	0	0	0
(Guatemala) Juan Salvatierra	15	15	15

13th place
(Ecuador) Juan Francisco Cueva	11	9	6	8
(Guatemala) Juan Salvatierra	8	11	11	11
15th place
(Argentina) Fernando Kurzbard	0	0	0
(Guatemala) Edwin Galicia	11	11	11

Note: Salvatierra won by forfeit against Galicia. Galicia won over Kurzbard by injury forfeit.

=== 17th-25th place ===
17-25 playoff - Round 1
(Honduras) Ronal Cardona	10	8	5
(Honduras) Carlos Medrano	12	11	11

Round 2
(Dominican Republic) Ramón de León	11	11	13
(Honduras) Carlos Medrano	8	6	11
(Chile) Rafael Gatica	4	6	3
(Cuba) Maikel Moyet	11	11	11
(Chile) Diego Gatica	12	11	11
(Cuba) Yandy Espinosa	10	8	6
(Puerto Rico) Abraham Mercado	6	4	5
2	(Colombia) Set Cubillos	11	11	11

Round 3
(Dominican Republic) Ramón de León	8	8	11	8
(Cuba) Maikel Moyet	11	11	9	11
(Chile) Diego Gatica	11	10	6	11	7
(Colombia) Set Cubillos	8	12	11	8	11

17th place
(Cuba) Maikel Moyet	11	9	4	11	8
(Colombia) Set Cubillos	6	11	11	8	11
19th place
1	(Dominican Republic) Ramón de León	11	11	11	11
2	(Colombia) Diego Gatica	13	8	8	9

=== 21st-24th place ===
21-24 playoff
(Chile) Rafael Gatica	5	8	8
(Honduras) Carlos Medrano	11	11	11
(Puerto Rico) Abraham Mercado	11	7	11	11
(Cuba) Yandy Espinosa	11	7	9	9

21st place
(Honduras) Carlos Medrano	11	11	11
(Puerto Rico) Abraham Mercado	7	9	3
23rd place
(Chile) Rafael Gatica	11	11	10	3	11
(Cuba) Yandy Espinosa	8	9	12	11	5

=== 5th-8th place ===
5-8 playoff
(Ecuador) Juan Francisco Cueva & Jose Daniel Ugalde	12	5	11	11	11
(Guatemala) Edwin Galicia & Christian Wer	14	11	7	8	7
(Argentina) Fernando Kurzbard & Daniel Maggi	0	0	0
(Canada) Coby Iwaasa & Trevor Webb	11	11	11

5th place
(Ecuador) Juan Francisco Cueva & Jose Daniel Ugalde	18	11	9	5	11
(Canada) Coby Iwaasa & Trevor Webb	16	9	11	11	7
7th place
(Guatemala) Edwin Galicia & Christian Wer	11	11	11
(Argentina) Fernando Kurzbard & Daniel Maggi	0	0	0

Note: Canada and Guatemala defeated Argentina by injury default.

=== 9th-11th place ===
9-11 playoff
(Honduras) Ronal Cardona & Carlos Medrano	5	7	10
(Chile) Rafael Gatica & Rodrigo Salgado	11	11	12

9th place
(Cuba) Yandy Espinosa & Maikel Moyet	11	11	11
(Chile) Rafael Gatica & Rodrigo Salgado	3	9	4
11th place
(Honduras) Ronal Cardona & Carlos Medrano

== Men's qualifying standings ==
Place	Men's singles	Men's doubles
1	(Bolivia) Conrrado Moscoso	(Mexico) Rodrigo Montoya & Eduardo Portillo
2	(Bolivia) Carlos Keller	(Bolivia) Kadim Carrasco & Conrrado Moscoso
3	(United States) Jake Bredenbeck	(United States) Jake Bredenbeck & Sam Bredenbeck
4	(Argentina) Diego Garcia	(Costa Rica) Andrés Acuña & Gabriel Garcia
5	(Mexico) Andree Parrilla	(Ecuador) Juan Francisco Cueva & Jose Daniel Ugalde
6	(Mexico) Eduardo Portillo	(Canada) Coby Iwaasa & Trevor Webb
7	(Costa Rica) Andrés Acuña	(Guatemala) Edwin Galicia & Christian Wer
8	(Canada) Trevor Webb	(Argentina) Fernando Kurzbard & Daniel Maggi
9	(Canada) Coby Iwaasa	(Cuba) Yandy Espinosa & Maikel Moyet
10	(Ecuador) Jose Daniel Ugalde	(Chile) Rafael Gatica & Rodrigo Salgado
11	(United States) Thomas Carter	(Honduras) Ronal Cardona & Eduardo Medrano
12	(Costa Rica) Gabriel Garcia	
13	(Guatemala) Juan Salvatierra	
14	(Ecuador) Juan Francisco Cueva	
15	(Guatemala) Edwin Galicia	
16	(Argentina) Fernando Kurzbard	
17	(Colombia) Set Cubillos	
18	(Cuba) Maikel Moyet	
19	(Dominican Republic) Ramón de León	
20	(Chile) Diego Gatica	
21	(Honduras) Carlos Medrano	
22	(Puerto Rico) Abraham Mercado	
23	(Chile) Rafael Gatica	
24	(Cuba) Yandy Espinosa	
25	(Honduras) Ronal Cardona	

=== 3rd place ===
3rd place
(Costa Rica) Maricruz Ortiz	0	0	0
(Argentina) Natalia Mendez	11	11	11

Note: Mendez won by forfeit.

=== 5th-8th place ===
5-8 playoff
(Guatemala) Gabriela Martinez	6	13	9	11	9
(Bolivia) Yasmine Sabja	11	11	11	9	11
(Colombia) Cristina Amaya	3	8	7
(Mexico) Paola Longoria	11	11	11

5th place
(Bolivia) Yasmine Sabja	6	4	8
(Mexico) Paola Longoria	11	11	11
7th place
(Guatemala) Gabriela Martinez	11	11	11
(Colombia) Cristina Amaya	0	0	0

Note: Martinez won by forfeit against Amaya.

=== 9th-16th place ===
9-16 playoff - First round
(Bolivia) Angélica Barrios	11	11	11
(Dominican Republic) Merynanyelly Delgado	6	5	7
(United States) Rhonda Rajsich	11	4	9
(United States) Erika Manilla	13	11	11
(Ecuador) Maria Paz Muñoz	11	11	11
(Ecuador) Maria José Muñoz	0	0	0
(Guatemala) Anna Aguilar	7	11	8
(Chile) Carla Muñoz	11	13	11

9-16 playoff - Second round
(Bolivia) Angélica Barrios	11	11	11
(United States) Erika Manilla	5	8	8
(Ecuador) Maria Paz Muñoz	12	9	5	9
(Chile) Carla Muñoz	10	11	11	11

9th place
(Bolivia) Angélica Barrios	11	11	11
(Chile) Carla Muñoz	8	6	8
11th place
(United States) Erika Manilla	11	8	11	11
(Ecuador) Maria Paz Muñoz	8	11	7	8

Note: Maria Paz Muñoz won by forfeit against Maria José Muñoz.

13-16 playoff
(United States) Rhonda Rajsich	11	4	8	11	10
(Dominican Republic) Merynanyelly Delgado	6	11	11	5	12
(Guatemala) Anna Aguilar	11	9	3	7
(Ecuador) Maria José Muñoz	5	11	11	11

13th place
(Dominican Republic) Merynanyelly Delgado	5	11	12	11
(Ecuador) Maria José Muñoz.	11	6	10	8
15th place
(United States) Rhonda Rajsich	11	11	11	11
(Guatemala) Anna Aguilar	13	9	5	4

=== 17th-25th place ===
17-25 playoff - Round 1
(Canada) Juliette Parent	11	11	11
(Cuba) Samira Ferrer Marcilli	6	4	0
(Costa Rica) Jimena Gomez	4	9	9
(Canada) Michèle Morissette	11	11	11

Round 2
(Colombia) Maria Paz Riquelme	5	8	4
(Canada) Juliette Parent	11	11	11
(Canada) Michèle Morissette	11	11	11
(Cuba) Paula Javiera Mansilla Sid	8	4	5

17th place
(Canada) Juliette Parent	11	11	11
(Canada) Michèle Morissette	0	0	0
19th place
(Colombia) Maria Paz Riquelme	0	0	0
(Chile) Paula Javiera Mansilla Sid	11	11	11

Note: Parent had a forfeit win over Morissette, and Mansilla had a forfeit win over Riquelme.

=== 21st-22nd place ===
21st place
(Costa Rica) Jimena Gomez	11	11	12
(Cuba) Samira Ferrer Marcilli	4	2	10

=== 5th-8th place ===
5th-8th playoff
(Colombia) Cristina Amaya & Maria Paz Riquelme	8	7	10
(Ecuador) Maria José Muñoz & Ana Sarmiento	11	11	12
(Chile) Carla Muñoz & Paula Javiera Mansilla Sid	8	5	5
(United States) Erika Manilla & Michelle Key	11	11	11

5th place
(Ecuador) Maria José Muñoz & Ana Sarmiento	4	11	5	4
(United States) Erika Manilla & Michelle Key	11	4	11	11
7th place
(Colombia) Cristina Amaya & Maria Paz Riquelme
(Chile) Carla Muñoz & Paula Javiera Mansilla Sid

=== 9th place ===
9th place
(Canada) Michèle Morissette & Danielle Ramsay	11	11	11
(Costa Rica) Maricruz Ortiz & Jimena Gomez	7	4	7

== Women's qualifying standings ==
Place	Women's singles	Women's doubles
1	(Mexico) Montserrat Mejia	(Mexico) Alexandra Herrera & Montserrat Mejia
2	(Argentina) Maria Jose Vargas	(Guatemala) Gabriela Martinez & Maria Renee Rodriguez
3	(Argentina) Natalia Mendez	(Bolivia) Angélica Barrios & Jenny Daza
4	(Costa Rica) Maricruz Ortiz	(Argentina) Valeria Centellas & Natalia Mendez
5	(Mexico) Paola Longoria	(United States) Erika Manilla & Michelle Key
6	(Bolivia) Yasmine Sabja	(Ecuador) Maria José Muñoz & Ana Sarmiento
7	(Guatemala) Gabriela Martinez	(Colombia) Cristina Amaya & Maria Paz Riquelme
8	(Colombia) Cristina Amaya	(Canada) Michèle Morissette & Danielle Ramsay
9	(Bolivia) Angélica Barrios	(Costa Rica) Jimena Gomez & Maricruz Ortiz
10	(Chile) Carla Muñoz	
11	(United States) Erika Manilla	
12	(Ecuador) Maria Paz Muñoz	
13	(Dominican Republic) Merynanyelly Delgado	
14	(Ecuador) Maria José Muñoz	
15	(United States) Rhonda Rajsich	
16	(Guatemala) Anna Aguilar	
17	(Canada) Juliette Parent	
18	(Canada) Michèle Morissette	
19	(Chile) Paula Mansilla	
20	(Colombia) Maria Paz Riquelme	
21	(Costa Rica) Jimena Gomez	
22	(Cuba) Samira Ferrer Marcilli	

=== 5th-8th place ===
5th-8th playoff
(Guatemala) Juan Salvatierra & Gabriela Martinez	6	12	5	11	8
(Ecuador) Juan Francisco Cueva & Maria Paz Muñoz	11	10	11	6	11
(Colombia) Cristina Amaya & Set Cubillos	8	11	7	11	11
(Chile) Jaime Mansilla & Carla Muñoz	11	8	11	8	6

5th place
(Ecuador) Juan Francisco Cueva & Maria Paz Muñoz	11	11	11
(Colombia) Cristina Amaya & Set Cubillos	0	0	0
7th place
(Guatemala) Juan Salvatierra & Gabriela Martinez	11	11	8	11
(Chile) Jaime Mansilla & Carla Muñoz	2	8	11	6

Note: Ecuador's win over Colombia was by forfeit.

=== 9th-12th place ===
9th-12th playoff
(Canada) Coby Iwaasa & Danielle Ramsay	11	11	11
(Cuba) Samira Ferrer Marcilli & Maikel Moyet	2	6	5
(Dominican Republic) Merynanyelly Delgado & Ramón de León	11	11	11
(Costa Rica) Felipe Camacho & Maricruz Ortiz	0	0	0

9th place
(Canada) Coby Iwaasa & Danielle Ramsay	15	8	11	12	11
(Dominican Republic) Merynanyelly Delgado & Ramón de León	17	11	8	10	8
11th place
(Cuba) Samira Ferrer Marcilli & Maikel Moyet	12	6	7	3
(Costa Rica) Felipe Camacho & Maricruz Ortiz	10	11	11	11

Note: The Dominican Republic defeated Costa Rica by forfeit.

== Mixed Doubles qualifying standings ==
Place	Mixed doubles
1	(Bolivia) Angélica Barrios & Conrrado Moscoso
2	(Mexico) Paola Longoria & Rodrigo Montoya
3	(United States) Sam Bredenbeck & Michelle Key
4	(Argentina) Diego Garcia & Maria Jose Vargas
5	(Ecuador) Juan Francisco Cueva & Maria José Muñoz
6	(Colombia) Cristina Amaya & Set Cubillos
7	(Guatemala) Gabriela Martinez & Juan Salvatierra
8	(Chile) Jaime Mansilla & Carla Muñoz
9	(Canada) Coby Iwaasa & Danielle Ramsay
10	(Dominican Republic) Ramón de León & Merynanyelly Delgado
11	(Costa Rica) Felipe Camacho & Maricruz Ortiz
12	(Cuba) Samira Ferrer Marcilli & Maikel Moyet
