= Bolivia at the 2025 World Games =

- IOC code: BOL
- NOC: Bolivian Olympic Committee

in Chengdu, China 7 August 2025 – 17 August 2025
- Competitors: 2 (1 man and 1 woman) in 1 sport and 3 events
- Medals Ranked 51st: Gold 1 Silver 0 Bronze 0 Total 1

World Games appearances
- 1981; 1985; 1989; 1993; 1997; 2001; 2005; 2009; 2013; 2017; 2022; 2025

Bolivia competed at the 2025 World Games held in Chengdu, China from 7 to 17 August 2025.

Athletes representing Bolivia won one gold medal and the country finished in 51st place in the medal table.

== Medalists ==
Medal	Name	Sport	Event	Date
Gold	Conrrado Moscoso	Racquetball	Men's singles	17 August

== Competitors ==
The following is the list of number of competitors in the Games.

Sport	Men	Women	Total
Racquetball	1	1	2
Total	1	1	2

== Racquetball ==
Athlete	Event	Round of 16	Quarterfinal	Semifinal	Final / BM	
Athlete	Event	Opposition Result	Opposition Result	Opposition Result	Opposition Result	Rank
Conrrado Moscoso	Men's singles					
Angélica Barrios	Women's singles					
Conrrado Moscoso; Angélica Barrios	Double					
