= Alba Boström =

Swedish powerlifter (born 2001)

Personal information
- Born: 27 July 2001 (age 25)
- Height: 154.5 cm (5 ft 0.8 in)
- Weight: 63.4 kg (140 lb)

Sport
- Sport: Powerlifting
Medal record
Women's powerlifting
Representing Sweden
World Games
Gold medal – first place	2025 Chengdu	Middleweight classic
IPF World Classic Powerlifting Championships
Gold medal – first place	2025 Chemnitz	– 63 kg

Alba Boström (born 27 July 2001) is a Swedish powerlifter. She competes in the 63 kg class in classic powerlifting and became the 2025 world champion. At the 2025 world championships, she set a new world record in the total weight with 565 kg. Boström is also a former junior world champion and holds several Nordic records.

== Powerlifting career ==
Boström had a successful career as a junior, which culminated in a gold medal at the 2024 Junior World Championships. During her junior years, she set several records, including junior world records in the bench press and total weight.

Her first success as a senior came at the IPF Classic Powerlifting World Championships in Chemnitz, Germany, in June 2025. During the competition, Boström performed nine out of nine approved lifts, resulting in a gold medal and a new world record. She qualified for the 2025 World Games held in Chengdu, China, competing in the middleweight classic event, where she went on to win the gold medal.

== Personal life ==
Boström has spoken openly in interviews about a background of mental illness, including disordered eating habits and binge eating. She has described powerlifting as a turning point that helped her build both physical and mental strength. In addition to her elite career, Boström works as an online powerlifting coach.
