= Costa Rica at the 2025 World Games =

- IOC code: CRC
- NOC: Olympic Committee of Costa Rica

in Chengdu, China 7 August 2025 – 17 August 2025
- Competitors: 7 (2 men and 5 women) in 3 sports and 8 events

World Games appearances
- 1981; 1985; 1989; 1993; 1997; 2001; 2005; 2009; 2013; 2017; 2022; 2025

Costa Rica will compete at the 2025 World Games held in Chengdu, China from 7 to 17 August 2025.

== Competitors ==
The following is the list of number of competitors in the Games.

| Sport | Men | Women | Total |
|---|---|---|---|
| Billards | 1 | 1 | 2 |
| Racquetball | 1 | 1 | 2 |
| Sambo | 0 | 3 | 3 |
| Total | 2 | 5 | 7 |

== Racquetball ==
| Athlete | Event | Round of 16 | Quarterfinal | Semifinal | Final / BM | |
| Athlete | Event | Opposition Result | Opposition Result | Opposition Result | Opposition Result | Rank |
|---|---|---|---|---|---|---|
| Acunya Araya Andres | Men's singles | | | | | |
| Larissa Faeth | Women's singles | | | | | |
| Acunya Araya Andres; Larissa Faeth | Double | | | | | |
