= Noa Man =

Dutch freerunner and practitioner of parkour

Personal information
- Full name: Noa Diorgina Man
- Nationality: Dutch
- Born: 11 December 2004 (age 21) Delft, Netherlands
- Website: www.noadiorgina.com

Sport
- Sport: Parkour
Medal record
Women's parkour
Representing Netherlands
World Games
Gold medal – first place	2022 Birmingham	Freestyle
Silver medal – second place	2022 Birmingham	Speedrun
Silver medal – second place	2025 Chengdu	Speedrun

Noa Diorgina Man (born 11 December 2004) is a Dutch freerunner and traceur. She is a three-time medalist at the World Games.

== Biography ==
Man began her career in freerunning and parkour when she was 7 years old. When she was 13 years of age, she became senior national champion. In 2021, she won the Red Bull Art of Motion. At the Parkour competitions at the 2022 World Games, she won the gold medal in the freestyle event and the silver medal in the speedrun event.
