= Norway at the 2025 World Games =

- IOC code: NOR
- NOC: Norwegian Olympic and Paralympic Committee and Confederation of Sports

in Chengdu, China 7 August 2025 – 17 August 2025
- Competitors: 15 (8 men and 7 women) in 4 sports and 12 events
- Medals Ranked 47th: Gold 1 Silver 0 Bronze 2 Total 3

World Games appearances
- 1981; 1985; 1989; 1993; 1997; 2001; 2005; 2009; 2013; 2017; 2022; 2025

Norway competed at the 2025 World Games held in Chengdu, China from 7 to 17 August 2025.

Athletes representing Norway won one gold medal and two bronze medals. The country finished in 47th place in the medal table.

== Medalists ==
Medal	Name	Sport	Event	Date
Gold	Marte Elverum	Powerlifting	Women's equipped heavyweight	17 August
Bronze	Kjell Egil Bakkelund	Powerlifting	Men's middleweight	14 August
Bronze	Marte Kjenner	Powerlifting	Women's heavyweight	15 August

== Competitors ==
The following is the list of number of competitors in the Games.

Sport	Men	Women	Total
Canoe marathon	1	0	1
Flying disc	3	3	6
Ju-jitsu	1	0	1
Powerlifting	3	4	7
Total	8	7	15

== Powerlifting ==
Classic

Athlete	Event	Exercises			Total weight	Total points	Rank
Athlete	Event	Squat	Bench press	Deadlift	Total weight	Total points	Rank
Marte Kjenneer	Women's heavyweight	200.0	132.5	225.0	557.5	114.89	3rd place, bronze medalist(s)
Olberg Bakkelund	Men's middleweight	260.0	197.5	317.5	775.0	113.07	3rd place, bronze medalist(s)

Equipped

Athlete	Event	Exercises			Total weight	Total points	Rank
Athlete	Event	Squat	Bench press	Deadlift	Total weight	Total points	Rank
Knut Einar Skaar	Men's heavyweight	405.0	280.0	330.0	1015.0	103.81	5
Asgeir Hoel	Men's heavyweight	410.0	260.0	315.0	985.0	100.79	7
Marte Elverum	Women's heavyweight	257.5	152.5	252.5	662.5	110.52	1st place, gold medalist(s)
Jenny Marie Johansen	Women's heavyweight	230.0	145.0	210.0	585.0	101.32	7
Marthe Tjelta	Women's middleweight	DSQ					
Anna Soerlie Heranger	Women's Super heavyweight	272.5	162.5	212.5	647.5	102.09	4
