= Ecuador at the 2025 World Games =

- IOC code: ECU
- NOC: Ecuadorian National Olympic Committee

in Chengdu, China 7 August 2025 – 17 August 2025
- Competitors: 13 (7 men and 6 women) in 4 sports and 26 events
- Medals Ranked 38th: Gold 1 Silver 3 Bronze 1 Total 5

World Games appearances
- 1981; 1985; 1989; 1993; 1997; 2001; 2005; 2009; 2013; 2017; 2022; 2025

Ecuador competed at the 2025 World Games held in Chengdu, China from 7 to 17 August 2025.

Athletes representing Ecuador won one gold medal, three silver medals and one bronze medal. The country finished in 38th place in the medal table.

== Medalists ==
Medal	Name	Sport	Event	Date
Gold	Gabriela Vargas	Track speed skating	Women's 5,000 metre point race	14 August
Silver	Nicolás García	Road speed skating	Men's 15,000 metre elimination race	13 August
Silver	Gabriela Vargas	Track speed skating	Women's 10,000 metre elimination race	15 August
Silver	Jennifer García; Fabiana Velez	Cheerleading	Mixed pom doubles	16 August
Bronze	Gabriela Vargas	Road speed skating	Women's 10,000 metre point race	12 August

== Competitors ==
The following is the list of number of competitors in the Games.

Sport	Men	Women	Total
Cheerleading	0	2	2
Powerlifting	4	1	5
Racquetball	1	1	2
Road speed skating	2	2	4
Total	7	6	13

== Powerlifting ==
Equipped

Athlete	Event	Exercises			Total weight	Total points	Rank
Athlete	Event	Squat	Bench press	Deadlift	Total weight	Total points	Rank
Franklin Leon	Men's Lightweight	280.0	175.0	250.0	705.0	99.78	6
Alex Ochoa	Men's Middleweight	335.0	240.0	285.0	860.0	102.24	5
Tomala Zambrano	Men's Middleweight	352.5	225.0	285.0	862.5	100.60	6
Moises Villon	Men's Heavyweight	375.0	282.5	282.5	940.0	100.99	6
Kenia Monserrate	Women's Middleweight	227.5	135.0	190.0	552.5	104.37	6

== Racquetball ==
Athlete	Event	Round of 16	Quarterfinal	Semifinal	Final / BM	
Athlete	Event	Opposition Result	Opposition Result	Opposition Result	Opposition Result	Rank
Jose Daniel Ugalde Albornoz	Men's singles					
Maria Veronica Sotomayor	Women's singles					
Jose Daniel Ugalde Albornoz; Maria Veronica Sotomayor	Double					
