= Guatemala at the 2025 World Games =

- IOC code: GUA
- NOC: Guatemalan Olympic Committee

in Chengdu, China 7 August 2025 – 17 August 2025
- Competitors: 9 (6 men and 3 women) in 6 sports and 18 events
- Medals Ranked 65th: Gold 0 Silver 1 Bronze 2 Total 3

World Games appearances
- 1981; 1985; 1989; 1993; 1997; 2001; 2005; 2009; 2013; 2017; 2022; 2025

Guatemala competed at the 2025 World Games held in Chengdu, China from 7 to 17 August 2025.

Athletes representing Guatemala won one silver medal and two bronze medals. The country finished in 65th place in the medal table.

== Medalists ==
Medal	Name	Sport	Event	Date
Silver	José Santiago	Kickboxing	Men's point fighting 74 kg	14 August
Bronze	Dalia Soberanis	Road speed skating	Women's 100 metre sprint	13 August
Bronze	Gabriela Martínez	Racquetball	Women's singles	16 August

== Competitors ==
The following is the list of number of competitors in the Games.

Sport	Men	Women	Total
Archery	1	0	1
Kickboxing	1	1	2
Racquetball	1	1	2
Road speed skating	1	1	2
Squash	2	0	2
Total	6	3	9

== Racquetball ==
Athlete	Event	Round of 16	Quarterfinal	Semifinal	Final / BM	
Athlete	Event	Opposition Result	Opposition Result	Opposition Result	Opposition Result	Rank
Edwin Galicia	Men's singles					
Ana Gabriela Martinez	Women's singles					
Edwin Galicia; Ana Gabriela Martinez	Double					

== Squash ==
Athlete	Event	Round of 32	Round of 16 / CR	Quarterfinals / CQ	Semi-finals / CS	Final / BM / CF	
Athlete	Event	Opposition Score	Opposition Score	Opposition Score	Opposition Score	Opposition Score	Rank
Junior Enriquez Franco	Men's singles	Solnicky (CZE); W 3–2	Wilhelmi (SUI); L 1–3	Classification round Tsukue (JPN); L 3–0	Did not advance		=13
Edwin Enriquez Franco	Men's singles	Gaeano (COL); W 3–0	Farkas (HUN); L 0–3	Classification round Van Niekerk (RSA); L 3–0	Did not advance		=13
