= Stefanny Navarro =

Spanish traceur

Personal information
- Nationality: Spanish
- Born: 7 May 1998 (age 28) Bogotá, Colombia

Sport
- Sport: Parkour
Medal record
Women's parkour
Representing Spain
Parkour World Championships
Silver medal – second place	2022 Tokyo	Speed

Stefanny Navarro (born 7 May 1998) is a Spanish traceur.

== Career ==
Navarro began practicing parkour in 2016. In June 2019, she won gold in the speed category at the World Cup in Montpellier. In May 2022 at the World Cup in Montpellier, Navarro took silver in speed and was only beaten by Miranda Tibbling.

In October 2022, at the Parkour World Championships in Tokyo, Navarro won the silver medal in speed category in the first edition of the championship. She finished in a time of 35.03 seconds and was beaten only by Tibbling.
