= Diego García (racquetball) =

Argentine racquetball player (born 2001)

Personal information
- Nationality: Argentine
- Born: June 22, 2001 (age 25)

Sport
- Sport: Racquetball
Medal record
Men's Racquetball
Representing Argentina
The World Games
| Silver medal – second place | 2025 Chengdu | Singles |
| Silver medal – second place | 2025 Chengdu | Doubles |
Pan American Games
| Silver medal – second place | 2023 Santiago | Mixed doubles |
World Championships
| Bronze medal – third place | 2022 San Luis Potosí | Mixed |
Pan American Championships
| Bronze medal – third place | 2026 Guatemala City | Team |
| Gold medal – first place | 2025 Guatemala City | Singles |
| Silver medal – second place | 2025 Guatemala City | Men's Doubles |
| Bronze medal – third place | 2023 Guatemala City | Singles |
| Bronze medal – third place | 2023 Guatemala City | Mixed Doubles |
| Bronze medal – third place | 2022 Santa Cruz | Mixed Doubles |

Diego García Quispe (born June 22, 2001) is an Argentine racquetball player. He is a former Pan American Champion in Men's Singles.

== Career ==
García played at the 2022 Pan American Racquetball Championships in Santa Cruz de la Sierra, Bolivia. He played Mixed Doubles with Valeria Centellas, losing in the semi-finals to Bolivians Conrrado Moscoso and Micaela Meneses, with these respective teams winning bronze and silver.

García and Centellas won a bronze medal at the 2022 World Championships. In mixed doubles, they lost to Mexicans Rodrigo Montoya and Samantha Salas in the semi-finals.

At the 2023 Pan American Racquetball Championships, García was a double bronze medalist. In Men's Singles, he defeated Mexican Eduardo Portillo in the quarterfinals, but lost in the semi-finals to Bolivian Carlos Keller. In Mixed Doubles, García and María José Vargas defeated Guatemalans Gabriela Martinez and Juan Salvatierra in the quarterfinals, 8–11, 11–6, 11–9, 11–8, but lost in the semi-finals to Mexicans Paola Longoria and Rodrigo Montoya, 11–3, 11–6, 9–11, 17–15.

At the 2023 Pan American Games, García and María José Vargas again played Mixed Doubles and they defeated Bolivians Moscoso and Angélica Barrios in the semi-finals, 9–11, 11–8, 11–8, 10–12, 11–9, but lost the final to Americans Adam Manilla and Erika Manilla, 11–4, 11–4, 11–6.

At the 2025 Pan American Racquetball Championships, García was a double medalist. In the Men's Singles, he won the gold medal, defeating Mexican Javier Mar in the final, 11–8, 11–8, 11–8. In the Men's Doubles, he and Gerson Miranda Martinez they lost to Kadim Carrasco and Conrrado Moscoso in the final, 11–4, 11–4, 7–11, 11–2.

At the 2025 World Games, García reached the finals in the men's singles and mixed doubles events. However, he lost both those finals. In the singles final, Bolivian Conrrado Moscoso defeated Garcia in five games, 9–11, 11–2, 11–9, 6–11, 14–12, while Americans Jake Bredenbeck and Naomi Ros beat Garcia and Maria Jose Vargas in the doubles final, 11–7, 11–9, 11–6.

García got a bronze medal in the Men's Team event at the 2026 Pan American Racquetball Championships in Guatemala City, Guatemala, as Argentina defeated Canada in the quarterfinals, but then lost to Mexico in the semi-finals. In Men's Singles, he lost to Bolivian Santiago Borja in the Round of 16, 8–11, 11–8, 13–11, 7–11, 12–10. Similarly, García and Gerson Miranda Martinez lost in the Round of 16 in Men's Doubles to Ecuador's Juan Francisco Cueva and Jose Daniel Ugalde, 11–5, 11–9, 11–9.

== See also ==
- List of racquetball players
