= Japan at the 2025 World Games =

- IOC code: JPN
- NOC: Japanese Olympic Committee

in Chengdu, China 7 August 2025 – 17 August 2025
- Competitors: 26 (9 men and 17 women) in 7 sports
- Medals Ranked 9th: Gold 7 Silver 12 Bronze 5 Total 24

World Games appearances
- 1981; 1985; 1989; 1993; 1997; 2001; 2005; 2009; 2013; 2017; 2022; 2025

Japan competed at the 2025 World Games held in Chengdu, China from 7 to 17 August 2025. Athletes representing Japan won seven gold medals, 12 silver medals and five bronze medals. The country finished in 9th place in the medal table.

== Medalists ==
Medal	Name	Sport	Event	Date
Gold	Kakeru Nishiyama	Karate	Men's kata	8 August
Gold	Japan men's national softball team: Kaito Masaki; Ryuji Okawa; Shota Onodera; Koki Sato; Yasuke Sakuraba; Tei Hamamoto; Fumiya Ueda; Fuga Nagai; Taiyo Kataoka; Yusuke Morita; Kanta Nishida; Kazuya Toriyama; Hiroki Ikeda; Kotaro Yasumi; Seii Kurowa	Softball	Men's tournament	10 August
Gold	Mutsuhiro Shiohata	Parkour	Men's freestyle	12 August
Gold	Satomi Watanabe	Squash	Women's singles	12 August
Gold	Riri Kitazume; Mizuki Saito	Aerobic gymnastics	Mixed pairs	15 August
Gold	Yusuke Satake	Powerlifting	Men's equipped lightweight	16 August
Gold	Yuki Hashimoto	Air sports	Drone racing	16 August
Silver	Maho Ono	Karate	Women's kata	8 August
Silver	Hiromu Hashimoto	Karate	Men's kumite 60 kg	8 August
Silver	Yugo Kozaki	Karate	Men's kumite 67 kg	8 August
Silver	Tomohiro Araya	Wushu	Men's taijiquan/taijijian combined	9 August
Silver	Sarara Shimada	Karate	Women's kumite 61 kg	9 August
Silver	Yusei Sakiyama	Karate	Men's kumite 75 kg	9 August
Silver	Shota Tezuka	Wakeboarding	Men's Freestyle	10 August
Silver	Saki Tanaka; Hikaru Mori	Trampoline gymnastics	Women's synchronised	10 August
Silver	Ayaka Miyashita	Billiard sports	Women's carom three cushion	13 August
Silver	Nene Nagai	Parkour	Women's freestyle	13 August
Silver	Kyota Ushiyama	Powerlifting	Men's classic lightweight	14 August
Silver	Issin Hishikawa (Issin)	Dancesport	B-Boys	17 August
Bronze	Tsubasa Kama	Karate	Women's kumite 68 kg	9 August
Bronze	Rikito Shimada	Karate	Men's kumite 84 kg	9 August
Bronze	Nanoha Kida	Wushu	Women's changquan/daoshu/gunshu combined	9 August
Bronze	Japan women's national softball team: Yume Kiriishi; Miu Goto; Minori Naito; Kyoko Ishikawa; Yukiko Ueno; Yukari Hamamura; Kanna Kudo; Natsumi Fujimori; Hotaru Tsukamoto; Sakura Miwa; Yui Sakamoto; Urara Fujimoto; Haruka Agatsuma; Ayana Karoji; Yuuki Kamata	Softball	Women's tournament	17 August
Bronze	Shigeyuki Nakarai (Shigekix)	Dancesport	B-Boys	17 August

Medals by sport
Sport	1st place, gold medalist(s)	2nd place, silver medalist(s)	3rd place, bronze medalist(s)	Total
Karate	1	5	2	8
Parkour	1	1	0	2
Powerlifting	1	1	0	2
Softball	1	0	1	2
Aerobic gymnastics	1	0	0	1
Air sports	1	0	0	1
Squash	1	0	0	1
Dancesport	0	1	1	2
Wushu	0	1	1	2
Billiard sports	0	1	0	1
Trampoline gymnastics	0	1	0	1
Wakeboarding	0	1	0	1
Total	7	12	5	24

== Competitors ==
The following is the list of number of competitors in the Games.

Sport	Men	Women	Total
Freediving	0	1	1
Wushu	2	2	4
Total	2	3	5

== Flag football ==
Women

Team	Event	Group play				Quarterfinals	Semifinal	Final / BM	
Team	Event	Opposition Result	Opposition Result	Opposition Result	Rank	Opposition Result	Opposition Result	Opposition Result	Rank
Japan women	Women's tournament	Mexico; L 41–24	Great Britain; L 26–24	Italy; W 33–6	3	Canada; L 32–27	Consolation semifinalsChina; L 28–22	7th place gameItaly; W 0–33	7

== Freediving ==
Athlete	Event	Score	Rank
Ozeki Yasuko	Women's Dynamic no Fins		
Ozeki Yasuko	Women's Dynamic with Fins		

== Gymnastics ==
=== Parkour ===
Men

Athlete	Event	Qualification		Final	
Athlete	Event	Result	Rank	Result	Rank
Mutsuhiro Shiohata	Men's freestyle	27.5	1 Q	28.8	1st place, gold medalist(s)

Women

Athlete	Event	Qualification		Final	
Athlete	Event	Result	Rank	Result	Rank
Nene Nagai	Women's freestyle	21.3	2 Q	22.9	2nd place, silver medalist(s)

== Lacrosse ==
Summary

Team	Event	Preliminary round				Semifinal	Final / BM	
Team	Event	Opposition Result	Opposition Result	Opposition Result	Rank	Opposition Result	Opposition Result	Rank
Japan women	Women's tournament							

== Powerlifting ==
Classic

Athlete	Event	Exercises			Total weight	Total points	Rank
Athlete	Event	Squat	Bench press	Deadlift	Total weight	Total points	Rank
Kyota Ushiyama	Men's lightweight	247.5	180.0	290.0	717.5	111.95	2nd place, silver medalist(s)

Equipped

Athlete	Event	Exercises			Total weight	Total points	Rank
Athlete	Event	Squat	Bench press	Deadlift	Total weight	Total points	Rank
Yusuke Satake	Men's lightweight	310.0	217.5	272.5	800.0	107.63	1st place, gold medalist(s)
Yukako Fukushima	Women's lightweight	185.0	112.5	162.5	460.0	102.38	4
Norihiro Otani	Men's middleweight	300.0	24.0	245.0	785.0	97.64	7

== Racquetball ==
Athlete	Event	Round of 16	Quarterfinal	Semifinal	Final / BM	
Athlete	Event	Opposition Result	Opposition Result	Opposition Result	Opposition Result	Rank
Michimune Kono	Men's singles					
Harumi Kajino	Women's singles					
Michimune Kono; Harumi Kajino	Double					

== Softball ==
Men

Team	Event	Group play				Semifinal	Final / BM	
Team	Event	Opposition Result	Opposition Result	Opposition Result	Rank	Opposition Result	Opposition Result	Rank
Japan men	Men's tournament	Venezuela (VEN) W 3–10	Czech Republic (CZE) W 2–8	Argentina (ARG) W 7–5	1	Canada (CAN) W 1–6	United States (USA) Cancelled	1st place, gold medalist(s)

Women

Team	Event	Group play				Semifinal	Final / BM	
Team	Event	Opposition Result	Opposition Result	Opposition Result	Rank	Opposition Result	Opposition Result	Rank
Japan women	Women's tournament	Australia (AUS) W 3–10	Puerto Rico (PUR) W 0–7	Canada (CAN) L 1–2	2	United States (USA) L 6–7	Canada (CAN) W 11–1	3rd place, bronze medalist(s)

== Squash ==
Athlete	Event	Round of 32	Round of 16 / CR	Quarterfinals / CQ	Semi-finals / CS	Final / BM / CF	
Athlete	Event	Opposition Score	Opposition Score	Opposition Score	Opposition Score	Opposition Score	Rank
Ryunosuke Tsukue	Men's singles	Kegel (CRO); W 0–3	Crouin (FRA); L 3–1	Classification round E. Franco (GUA); W 3–0	Classification round Zaman (PAK); L 1–3	Did not advance	11
Satomi Watanabe	Women's singles	Yin (CHN); W 3–0	CHukwu (HUN); W 3–1	Hani (EGY); W 3–0	Dominguez (ESP); W 3–0	Stephan (FRA); W 3–0	1st place, gold medalist(s)
Risa Sugimoto	Women's singles	Gomez (ESP); L 0–3	Classification round Barbeau (FRA); L 3–1	Classification round Lamb (AUS); W 3–0	Classification round Zhang (CHN); W 1–3	Classification Final; Yin (CHN); W 0–3	25

== Wushu ==
Japan qualified four athlete at the 2023 World Wushu Championships.

Taolu

Athlete	Event	First routine		Second routine		Final score	
Athlete	Event	Result	Rank	Result	Rank	Result	Rank
Tomohiro Araya	Men's taijiquan and taijijian combined						
Ryo Murakami	Men's taijiquan and taijijian combined						
Nanoha Kida	Women's changquan & jianshu and qiangshu combined						
Shiho Saito	Women's taijiquan and taijijian combined						
