= Naomi Ros =

USA racquetball player

Personal information
- Born: 31 August 2005 (age 20)

Sport
- Country: USA
- Sport: Racquetball
Medal record
Women's racquetball
Representing United States
World Games
Gold medal – first place	2025 Chengdu	Mixed Doubles
Pan Am Championships
Silver medal – second place	2024 Guatemala	Doubles
Bronze medal – third place	2024 Guatemala	Team

Naomi Ros (born 31 August 2005) is an American racquetball player. Ros is the current World Games champion in Mixed Doubles, winning gold at the 2025 World Games in Chengdu, China with Jake Bredenbeck. She is also the current USA Racquetball Women’s Champion.

== Career ==
Ros played on Team USA at the 2024 Pan American Racquetball Championships in Guatemala City, Guatemala, where she played Women’s Doubles with Lexi York. They reached the final, but lost to Argentina’s Natalia Mendez and Maria Jose Vargas, 7-11, 11-8, 10-12, 11-9, 11-9. She also medaled in the Women’s Team event, as the USA got bronze, losing in the semi-finals to Argentina.

Ros won her first USA Racquetball National Women’s Singles title in 2024, when she defeated Hollie Scott in the final, 11-9, 6-11, 11-9, 9-11, 12-10.

Her win got Ros a spot on Team USA for the 2025 World Games in Chengdu, China, where she won gold in Mixed Doubles with Jake Bredenbeck. They defeated Canadians Coby Iwaasa and Frédérique Lambert, 9-11, 11-5, 8-11, 11-9, 11-9, in the semi-finals, and Argentines Maria Jose Vargas and Diego Garcia in the final, 11-7, 11-9, 11-6. In singles, Ros lost to Bolivian Angélica Barrios, 10-12, 11-9, 11-8, 11-9, in the quarterfinals.

== See also ==
- List of racquetball players
