= Mexico at the 2025 World Games =

- IOC code: MEX
- NOC: Mexican Olympic Committee

in Chengdu, China 7 August 2025 – 17 August 2025
- Competitors: 41 (13 men and 28 women) in 14 sports and 37 events
- Medals Ranked 21st: Gold 4 Silver 3 Bronze 3 Total 10

World Games appearances
- 1981; 1985; 1989; 1993; 1997; 2001; 2005; 2009; 2013; 2017; 2022; 2025

Mexico will compete at the 2025 World Games held in Chengdu, China from 7 to 17 August 2025.

Athletes representing Mexico won four gold medals, three silver medals and three bronze medals. The country finished in 21st place in the medal table.

== Medalists ==
Medal	Name	Sport	Event	Date
Gold	Andrea Becerra	Archery	Women's individual compound	9 August
Gold	Laura Burgos	Muaythai	Women's 54 kg	10 August
Gold	Anahí Álvarez	Duathlon	Women's individual	15 August
Gold	Silvia Contreras; Victoria Chávez; Diana Flores; Andrea Fernández; Ana Aguayo; Elizabeth Bourde; Andrea Martínez; Mónica Rangel; Zara Galan; Allison Salazar; Tania Rincón; Ángela Funes	Flag football	Women's tournament	17 August
Silver	Andrea Becerra; Sebastián García Flores	Archery	Mixed team compound	8 August
Silver	Hector Solorio	Kickboxing	Men's point fighting 84 kg	14 August
Silver	Paola Longoria	Racquetball	Women's singles	17 August
Bronze	Manuel Alberto Cisneros; Jose Gilberto Moreno	Ju-jitsu	Mixed duo para physical	12 August
Bronze	Valentina Letelier	Road speed skating	Women's 15,000 m elimination race	13 August
Bronze	Eduardo Portillo	Racquetball	Men's singles	16 August

Medals by sport
Sport	1st place, gold medalist(s)	2nd place, silver medalist(s)	3rd place, bronze medalist(s)	Total
Archery	1	1	0	2
Muaythai	1	0	0	1
Duathlon	1	0	0	1
Flag football	1	0	0	1
Racquetball	0	1	1	2
Kickboxing	0	1	0	1
Ju-jitsu	0	0	1	1
Road speed skating	0	0	1	1
Total	4	3	3	10

== Competitors ==
The following is the list of number of competitors in the Games.

Sport	Men	Women	Total
American football	0	12	12
Archery	1	2	3
Cheerleading	0	2	2
Parkour gymnastics	1	1	2
Ju-jitsu	2	0	2
Kickboxing	2	1	3
Muaythai	1	1	2
Powerboating	0	1	1
Racquetball	1	1	2
Rollersports	1	1	2
Sambo	0	2	2
Triathlon	2	2	4
Wakeboarding	1	0	1
Wushu	1	0	1
Total	13	28	40

== Flag football ==
Women

Team	Event	Group play				Quarterfinals	Semifinal	Final / BM	
Team	Event	Opposition Result	Opposition Result	Opposition Result	Rank	Opposition Result	Opposition Result	Opposition Result	Rank
Mexico women	Women's tournament	Japan; W 41–24	Italy; W 46–7	Great Britain; W 13–34	1 Q	China; W 40–0	Canada; W 25–13	United States; W 21–26	1st place, gold medalist(s)

== Gymnastics ==
=== Parkour ===
Men

Athlete	Event	Qualification		Final	
Athlete	Event	Result	Rank	Result	Rank
Andres Fierro	Men's speed	28.37	7 R	Did not advance	

Women

Athlete	Event	Qualification		Final	
Athlete	Event	Result	Rank	Result	Rank
Raquel Olson	Women's speed	45.34	6 Q	42.54	6

== Powerlifting ==
Classic

Athlete	Event	Exercises			Total weight	Total points	Rank
Athlete	Event	Squat	Bench press	Deadlift	Total weight	Total points	Rank
Santos Jimenez	Men's Lightweight	225.0	175.0	280.0	680.0	106.11	5

== Racquetball ==
Athlete	Event	Round of 16	Quarterfinal	Semifinal	Final / BM	
Athlete	Event	Opposition Result	Opposition Result	Opposition Result	Opposition Result	Rank
Eduardo Portillo	Men's singles					
Paola Longoria	Women's singles					
Eduardo Portillo; Paola Longoria	Double					
