= Angélica Barrios =

Bolivian racquetball player (born 2000)

Personal information
- Born: Angélica Steffany Barrios; May 5, 2000 (age 26) Bolivia

Sport
- Sport: Racquetball
Medal record
Women's Racquetball
Representing Bolivia
Pan American Games
Bronze medal – third place	2023 Santiago	Doubles
Bronze medal – third place	2023 Santiago	Mixed Doubles
Bronze medal – third place	2019 Lima	Team
World Championships
Bronze medal – third place	2022 San Luis Potosi	Singles
Silver medal – second place	2022 San Luis Potosi	Team
Pan American Championships
Gold medal – first place	2023 Guatemala	Mixed Doubles
Gold medal – first place	2022 Santa Cruz	Singles
Bronze medal – third place	2018 Temuco	Doubles
South American Games
Silver medal – second place	2018 Cochabamba	Doubles
Silver medal – second place	2018 Cochabamba	Team
World Games
Bronze medal – third place	2022 Birmingham	Singles

Angélica Barrios (born May 5, 2000) is a Bolivian racquetball player. Barrios is the current Pan American Champion in Mixed Doubles, winning the title at the 2023 Pan American Racquetball Championships in Guatemala City, Guatemala, and a former Pan Am Champion in Women's Singles. She is also the first Bolivian to win a medal at the World Games, as she won bronze at the 2022 World Games in Birmingham, Alabama.

== 2015–2019 – Success at World Juniors and medals for Bolivia ==
In 2015, Barrios was the runner-up at the International Racquetball Federation (IRF) World Junior Championships in the Girls U14 Singles division, losing to Bolivian teammate Romina Rivero, 15–11, 15–11, in Santo Domingo, Dominican Republic. Two years later Barrios won Girls U16 Singles at World Juniors in Minneapolis by defeating Mexican Ana Laura Flores, 15–2, 15–13, in the final.

In her first year of U18, Barrios lost to Montserrat Mejía of Mexico in semi-finals of Girls U18 Singles at the 2018 World Juniors, 15–14, 15–8, in San Luis Potosí, Mexico. But in her second year, she won gold in both Girls U18 singles and doubles with Valeria Centellas in San José, Costa Rica. Barrios and Centellas faced off in the singles final with Barrios coming out on top 15–10, 15–13.

Barrios was a bronze medalist in Women's Doubles with Jenny Daza at the 2018 Pan American Championships in Temuco, Chile, where they defeated Cubans Maria Viera and Yurisleidis Araujo, 13–15, 15–12, 11–7, in the quarterfinals, but lost to Mexicans Paola Longoria and Alexandra Herrera, 15–8, 15–8.

The 2018 South American Games were in Cochabamba, Bolivia, where Barrios played Women's Doubles with Jenny Daza as well as in the Women's Team event, and earned silver medals for Bolivia in both events. In doubles, she and Daza defeated Colombians Cristina Amaya and Carolina Gómez, 15–5, 15–13, in the semi-finals, but lost to Argentina's Natalia Mendez and Maria Jose Vargas, 15–11, 15–10, in the final. In the team competition, Bolivia beat Colombia in the semi-finals, and lost to Argentina in the final.

Barrios began playing on the Ladies Professional Racquetball Tour in 2017, but only a few events a season. She did not progress past the Round of 16 until March 2019, when she reached the semi-finals at the Bolivia American Iris event in Coachabama, Bolivia, where she defeated American veteran Rhonda Rajsich in the quarterfinals, 5–11, 13–11, 11–8, 11–6, before losing to Samantha Salas in the semi-finals, 11–3, 2–11, 11–6, 11–5.

She played Women's Singles in the 2019 Pan American Championships in Barranquilla, Colombia, and after defeating Canadian Erin Geeraert, 15–4, 15–4, in the Round of 32, Barrios lost to Argentina's Natalia Mendez, 15–3, 15–11, in the Round of 16.

Barrios was on the Bolivian team for the 2019 Pan American Games in Lima, Peru. In Women's Singles she beat Colombian Cristina Amaya, 15–11, 12–15, 11–10, in the Round of 16, but then lost to Mexican Paola Longoria, 15–6, 15–4, in the quarterfinals. She played Women's Doubles with Jenny Daza, and they lost to the USA team of Kelani Lawrence and Rhonda Rajsich, 15–4, 15–9, in the quarterfinals. Barrios did make the podium in the Women's Team event, as Bolivia defeated Cuba in the first round, and beat Guatemala in the quarterfinals, before losing to Argentina in the semi-finals, resulting in a bronze medal.

== 2020 to present – Breakthrough and Pan American Championship ==
Barrios reached a LPRT final for the first time in December 2020, when – as the 23rd seed – she defeated María José Vargas in the quarterfinals, 1–15, 15–8, 11–10, and Alexandra Herrera in the semi-finals, 15–14, 15–10, of the TeamRoot.com Super Max Slam in Overland Park, Kansas. Barrios lost to Paola Longoria in the final, 15–5, 15–9.

Barrios's first semi-final appearance at the US Open came in 2021, when – as the 10th seed – she lost to 3rd seed María José Vargas, 10–15, 15–4, 11–3. But Barrios did win the Women's Open division at the US Open that year, defeating Carla Muñoz in the final, 15–12, 15–6, after beating Kelani Lawrence in the semi-finals, 15–14, 15–5.

At the 2021 Racquetball World Championships in Guatemala City, Guatemala, Barrios played Women's Singles, and beat team-mate Micaela Meneses, 13–15, 15–7, 11–3, in the Round of 16, but then lost to American Kelani Lawrence, 15–13, 15–11, in the quarterfinals.

In April 2022, Barrios won the Pan American Championships on home soil in Santa Cruz de la Sierra, Bolivia. She defeated American Kelani Lawrence in the Round of 16, 15–7, 10–15, 15–14, 15–10, then beat Mexican Alexandra Herrera in the quarterfinals, 15–9, 10–15, 15–9, 15–10, and Guatemalan Gabriela Martinez in the semi-finals, 15–10, 9–15, 15–7, 15–11. Then in the final, Barrios came back from two games down in the final to defeat Argentina's María José Vargas in the final, 14–15, 10–15, 15–10, 15–14, 12–10. In so doing, Barrios became the first woman to win gold for Bolivia at the Pan Am Championships.

Barrios's performance at the 2021 Racquetball World Championships qualified her for 2022 World Games in Birmingham, Alabama, where she captured the bronze medal in women's singles. Barrios beat Natalia Mendez of Argentina, 15–9, 7–15, 15–14, 15–9, in the quarterfinals, lost to eventual gold medalist Paola Longoria of Mexico in the semi-finals, 15–12, 15–12, 15–9, and then won the 3rd place match against Mexican Samantha Salas, 15–4, 15–12, 9–15, 15–12. She's the first Bolivian player to medal in racquetball at the World Games.

At the 2024 Racquetball World Championships in San Antonio, Texas, Barrios was a bronze medalist in Mixed Doubles with Conrrado Moscoso, as they lost in the semi-finals to Mexicans Javier Mar and Montserrat Mejia. In Women's Singles, Barrios lost to American Kelani Lawrence in the Round of 16, and in doubles she and Jenny Daza lost to Canadians Frédérique Lambert and Juliette Parent in the quarterfinals.

Barrios competed at the 2025 World Games in Chengdu, China, where she finished fourth in Women's Singles. She lost in the semi-finals to Mexican Paola Longoria, as the result of an injury to the meniscus in her right knee during the fifth game. Her injury prevented her from contesting the bronze medal match against Guatemalan Gabriela Martinez. She also played Mixed Doubles with Conrrado Moscoso, and they had to default their quarterfinal match versus Japan's Michimune Kono and Harumi Kajino due to Barrios's injury.

== Career summary ==
Barrios has represented Bolivia internationally several times, reaching the podium six times with the highlight being her gold medal win at the 2022 Pan American Racquetball Championships.

=== Career record ===
This table lists Barrios's results across annual events.

Event	2017	2018	2019	2020	2021	2022	2023	2024	2025
US Open	16	32	32	P	SF	QF	-	-	-
LPRT Ranking		23	19	33	8	7	6	19	21

Note: W = winner, F = finalist, SF = semi-finalist, QF = quarterfinalist, 16 = Round of 16. P = pandemic cancelled event.

== See also ==
- List of racquetball players
