= Orienteering at the 2009 World Games – Men's middle distance =

Orienteering men's middle distance at the 2009 World Games
- Venue: Chengcing Lake
- Location: Kaohsiung, Taiwan
- Date: 18 July 2009
- Competitors: 36 from 18 nations

Medalists
gold medal	(Switzerland) Daniel Hubmann
silver medal	(Russia) Dmitry Tsvetkov
bronze medal	(Russia) Andrey Khramov

The men's middle distance competition in orienteering at the 2009 World Games took place on 18 July 2009 at the Chengcing Lake in Kaohsiung, Taiwan.

== Competition format ==
A total of 36 athletes entered the competition. Every athlete had to check in at control points, which were located across the course.

== Results ==
Rank	Athlete	Nation	Time
1st place, gold medalist(s)	Daniel Hubmann	Switzerland	27:43.4
2nd place, silver medalist(s)	Dmitry Tsvetkov	Russia	28:16.6
3rd place, bronze medalist(s)	Andrey Khramov	Russia	28:51.8
4	Tero Föhr	Finland	29:00.3
5	Mattias Millinger	Sweden	29:01.2
6	Øystein Kvaal Østerbø	Norway	29:32.1
7	Simonas Krėpšta	Lithuania	29:38.4
8	Jonas Vytautas Gvildys	Lithuania	29:52.2
9	Matthias Müller	Switzerland	30:15.9
10	Peter Öberg	Sweden	30:49.2
11	Tomáš Dlabaja	Czech Republic	30:54.8
12	Scott Fraser	Great Britain	30:55.5
13	Julian Dent	Australia	31:08.5
14	Andreas Rüedlinger	Switzerland	31:13.2
15	David Brickhill-Jones	Great Britain	31:13.9
16	Rasmus Søes	Denmark	31:20.1
17	Mikkel Lund	Denmark	31:24.4
18	Ross Morrison	New Zealand	31:39.6
19	Edgars Bertuks	Latvia	31:44.6
20	Alexey Bortnik	Russia	32:04.2
21	Darren Ashmore	New Zealand	32:19.8
22	Jan Šedivý	Czech Republic	32:22.3
23	Simon Uppill	Australia	32:27.9
24	Mārtiņš Sirmais	Austria	32:37.0
25	Lukáš Barták	Slovakia	32:52.0
26	Jean Baptiste Bourrin	France	33:26.8
27	Hiroyuki Kato	Japan	34:08.8
28	Chen Cheng-hsiung	Chinese Taipei	35:18.4
29	Pavol Bukovác	Slovakia	35:35.9
30	Michael Smith	Canada	36:02.1
31	Nicholas Mulder	South Africa	37:23.0
32	Wu Ming-yen	Chinese Taipei	38:13.5
	Shigeyuki Koizumi	Japan	DSQ
	Clement Valla	France	DSQ
	Lars Skjeset	Norway	DSQ
	Pasi Ikonen	Finland	DSQ
