= 2012 Orienteering World Cup =

International orienteering competition

World Cup events
- Individual: 13

Men's World Cup
- 1st: Matthias Kyburz (SUI)
- 2nd: Olav Lundanes (NOR)
- 3rd: Matthias Merz (SUI)
- Most wins: Matthias Kyburz (SUI) (4); Olav Lundanes (NOR) (4)

Women's World Cup
- 1st: Simone Niggli-Luder (SUI)
- 2nd: Minna Kauppi (FIN)
- 3rd: Tatiana Ryabkina (RUS)
- Most wins: Simone Niggli-Luder (SUI) (11)

Team World Cup
- 1st: No team events held

The 2012 Orienteering World Cup was the 18th edition of the Orienteering World Cup. It contained 13 competitions, which took place in Sweden, Switzerland, Norway and Finland. The European Orienteering Championships in Falun, Sweden and the 2012 World Orienteering Championships in Lausanne, Switzerland were included in the World Cup.

== Events ==
=== Men ===
	Venue	Distance	Date	Winner	2nd	3rd
Round 1 – European Orienteering Championships
1	(Sweden) Falun	Middle (EOC)	17 May	(Norway) Olav Lundanes	(Russia) Valentin Novikov	(Norway) Carl Waaler Kaas
2	(Sweden) Falun	Long (EOC)	18 May	(Norway) Olav Lundanes	(Switzerland) Matthias Merz	(Russia) Valentin Novikov
3	(Sweden) Falun	Sprint (EOC)	19 May	(Sweden) Jonas Leandersson	(Bulgaria) Kiril Nikolov	(Sweden) Jerker Lysell
Round 2 – Switzerland
4	(Switzerland) St. Gallen	Middle	23 June	(Switzerland) Matthias Kyburz	(Norway) Olav Lundanes	(Switzerland) Baptiste Rollier
5	(Switzerland) St. Gallen	Sprint	24 June	(Sweden) Jerker Lysell	(Switzerland) Matthias Kyburz	(Switzerland) Matthias Merz
Round 3 – World Orienteering Championships
6	(Switzerland) Lausanne	Sprint (WOC)	14 July	(Switzerland) Matthias Kyburz	(Switzerland) Matthias Merz	(Switzerland) Matthias Müller
7	(Switzerland) Lausanne	Middle (WOC)	17 July	(Latvia) Edgars Bertuks	(Russia) Valentin Novikov	(Switzerland) Fabian Hertner
8	(Switzerland) Lausanne	Long (WOC)	19 July	(Norway) Olav Lundanes	(Switzerland) Matthias Merz	(Latvia) Edgars Bertuks
Round 4 – Nordic Orienteering Tour (NORT)
9	(Norway) Holmenkollen	Sprint	1 September	(Norway) Olav Lundanes	(Switzerland) Matthias Kyburz	(Sweden) William Lind
10	(Norway) Holmenkollen	Middle	2 September	(France) Thierry Gueorgiou	(Sweden) Peter Öberg	(Switzerland) Matthias Kyburz
11	(Sweden) Gothenburg	Knockout Sprint	4 September	(Switzerland) Matthias Kyburz	(France) Frederic Tranchand	(Sweden) Peter Öberg
12	(Finland) Vuokatti	Sprint	7 September	(Sweden) Jonas Leandersson	(Switzerland) Matthias Kyburz	(Switzerland) Fabian Hertner
13	(Finland) Vuokatti	Middle; Chasing start	7 September	(Switzerland) Matthias Kyburz	(France) Thierry Gueorgiou	(Norway) Olav Lundanes

=== Women ===
	Venue	Distance	Date	Winner	2nd	3rd
Round 1 – European Orienteering Championships
1	(Sweden) Falun	Middle	17 May	(Switzerland) Simone Niggli-Luder	(Finland) Minna Kauppi	(Russia) Tatiana Ryabkina
2	(Sweden) Falun	Long	18 May	(Switzerland) Simone Niggli-Luder	(Russia) Tatiana Ryabkina	(Finland) Minna Kauppi
3	(Sweden) Falun	Sprint	19 May	(Switzerland) Simone Niggli-Luder	(Sweden) Lena Eliasson	(Denmark) Maja Alm
Round 2 – Switzerland
4	(Switzerland) St. Gallen	Middle	23 June	(Switzerland) Simone Niggli-Luder	(Finland) Minna Kauppi (Switzerland) Judith Wyder	none
5	(Switzerland) St. Gallen	Sprint	24 June	(Switzerland) Simone Niggli-Luder	(Denmark) Maja Alm	(Sweden) Tove Alexandersson
Round 3 – World Orienteering Championships
6	(Switzerland) Lausanne	Sprint (WOC)	14 July	(Switzerland) Simone Niggli-Luder	(Denmark) Maja Alm	(Sweden) Annika Billstam
7	(Switzerland) Lausanne	Middle (WOC)	17 July	(Finland) Minna Kauppi	(Sweden) Tove Alexandersson	(Russia) Tatiana Ryabkina
8	(Switzerland) Lausanne	Long (WOC)	19 July	(Switzerland) Simone Niggli-Luder	(Finland) Minna Kauppi	(Sweden) Annika Billstam
Round 4 – Nordic Orienteering Tour (NORT)
9	(Norway) Holmenkollen	Sprint	1 September	(Switzerland) Simone Niggli-Luder	(Denmark) Emma Klingenberg	(Norway) Anne Margrethe Hausken Nordberg
10	(Norway) Holmenkollen	Middle	2 September	(Switzerland) Simone Niggli-Luder	(Switzerland) Judith Wyder	(Russia) Tatiana Ryabkina
11	(Sweden) Gothenburg	Knockout Sprint	4 September	(Denmark) Emma Klingenberg	(Russia) Tatiana Ryabkina	(Switzerland) Judith Wyder
12	(Finland) Vuokatti	Sprint	7 September	(Switzerland) Simone Niggli-Luder	(Sweden) Helena Jansson	(Denmark) Emma Klingenberg
13	(Finland) Vuokatti	Middle; Chasing start	7 September	(Switzerland) Simone Niggli-Luder	(Sweden) Helena Jansson	(Finland) Minna Kauppi

== Overall standings ==
This section shows the final standings after all 13 events.

=== Men ===
Rank	Name	Points
1	(Switzerland) Matthias Kyburz	784
2	(Norway) Olav Lundanes	688
3	(Switzerland) Matthias Merz	553
4	(Sweden) Jonas Leandersson	376
5	(Sweden) Jerker Lysell	364
6	(France) Thierry Gueorgiou	337
7	(France) Frederic Tranchand	319
8	(Sweden) Gustav Bergman	292
9	(Switzerland) Matthias Müller	291
10	(Sweden) Peter Öberg	279

=== Women ===
Rank	Name	Points
1	(Switzerland) Simone Niggli-Luder	934
2	(Finland) Minna Kauppi	630
3	(Russia) Tatiana Ryabkina	510
4	(Sweden) Helena Jansson	476
5	(Sweden) Tove Alexandersson	432
6	(Switzerland) Judith Wyder	427
7	(Sweden) Annika Billstam	391
8	(Denmark) Maja Alm	389
9	(Denmark) Ida Bobach	386
10	(Norway) Anne Margrethe Hausken Nordberg	354
