= 2013 Orienteering World Cup =

International orienteering competition

World Cup events
- Individual: 13

Men's World Cup
- 1st: Matthias Kyburz (SUI)
- 2nd: Daniel Hubmann (SUI)
- 3rd: Fabian Hertner (SUI)
- Most wins: Matthias Kyburz (SUI) (4)

Women's World Cup
- 1st: Simone Niggli-Luder (SUI)
- 2nd: Tove Alexandersson (SWE)
- 3rd: Annika Billstam (SWE)
- Most wins: Simone Niggli-Luder (SUI) (9)

The 2013 Orienteering World Cup was the 19th edition of the Orienteering World Cup. It contained 13 competitions, which took place in New Zealand, Sweden, Norway, Finland and Switzerland.

== Events ==
=== Women ===
	Venue	Distance	Date	Winner	2nd	3rd
1	(New Zealand) Palmerston North	Middle	January 6	(Sweden) Helena Jansson	(Denmark) Ida Bobach	(Russia) Tatiana Ryabkina
2	(New Zealand) Wellington	Sprint	January 8	(Sweden) Tove Alexandersson	(Sweden) Helena Jansson	(New Zealand) Lizzie Ingham
3	(New Zealand) Napier	Middle	January 13	(Sweden) Tove Alexandersson	(Norway) Anne Margrethe Hausken Nordberg	(Finland) Minna Kauppi
NORT (Nordic Orienteering Tour)
4	(Norway) Oslo	Sprint	June 1	(Switzerland) Simone Niggli	(Sweden) Tove Alexandersson	(Sweden) Lina Strand
5	(Norway) Oslo	Middle	June 2	(Switzerland) Simone Niggli	(Sweden) Tove Alexandersson	(Norway) Mari Fasting
6	(Sweden) Sigtuna	Knock-Out Sprint	June 4	(Denmark) Emma Klingenberg	(Switzerland) Simone Niggli	(Switzerland) Judith Wyder
7	(Finland) Turku	Sprint	June 7	(Switzerland) Simone Niggli	(Denmark) Emma Klingenberg	(Sweden) Annika Billstam
8	(Finland) Turku	Middle	June 8	(Russia) Tatiana Ryabkina	(Sweden) Annika Billstam	(Switzerland) Simone Niggli
NORT	(Norway) (Sweden) (Finland)	NORT Overall	June 1 – June 8	(Switzerland) Simone Niggli	(Sweden) Tove Alexandersson	(Sweden) Annika Billstam
WOC (World Championships)
9	(Finland) Vuokatti	Sprint	July 8	(Switzerland) Simone Niggli	(Sweden) Annika Billstam	(Finland) Venla Niemi
10	(Finland) Vuokatti	Long	June 9	(Switzerland) Simone Niggli	(Sweden) Tove Alexandersson	(Finland) Merja Rantanen
11	(Finland) Vuokatti	Middle	July 12	(Switzerland) Simone Niggli	(Sweden) Tove Alexandersson	(Sweden) Lena Eliasson
12	(Switzerland) Baden	Unknown	October 5	(Switzerland) Simone Niggli	(Sweden) Annika Billstam	(Ukraine) Nadiya Volynska
13	(Switzerland) Baden	Unknown	October 6	(Switzerland) Simone Niggli	(Switzerland) Judith Wyder	(Denmark) Emma Klingenberg

=== Men ===
	Venue	Distance	Date	Winner	2nd	3rd
1	(New Zealand) Palmerston North	Middle	January 6	(Switzerland) Fabian Hertner	(Sweden) Johan Runesson	(Sweden) Jerker Lysell
2	(New Zealand) Wellington	Sprint	January 8	(Switzerland) Matthias Kyburz	(Sweden) Jerker Lysell	(Switzerland) Matthias Merz
3	(New Zealand) Napier	Middle	January 13	(Sweden) Jerker Lysell	(Norway) Olav Lundanes	(Sweden) Peter Öberg
NORT (Nordic Orienteering Tour)
4	(Norway) Oslo	Sprint	June 1	(Switzerland) Matthias Kyburz	(Switzerland) Daniel Hubmann	(Denmark) Tue Lassen
5	(Norway) Oslo	Middle	June 2	(Norway) Carl Godager Kaas	(Sweden) Gustav Bergman	(Norway) Bjørn Ekeberg
6	(Sweden) Sigtuna	Knock-Out Sprint	June 4	(Switzerland) Fabian Hertner	(Norway) Øystein Kvaal Østerbø	(Switzerland) Matthias Kyburz
7	(Finland) Turku	Sprint	June 7	(Switzerland) Matthias Kyburz	(Switzerland) Daniel Hubmann	(Sweden) Jerker Lysell
8	(Finland) Turku	Middle	June 8	(Switzerland) Matthias Müller	(Finland) Mårten Boström	(Sweden) Filip Dahlgren
NORT	(Norway) (Sweden) (Finland)	NORT Overall	June 1 – June 8	(Switzerland) Daniel Hubmann	(Switzerland) Matthias Kyburz	(Sweden) Gustav Bergman
WOC (World Championships)
9	(Finland) Vuokatti	Sprint	July 6	(Finland) Mårten Boström	(United Kingdom) Scott Fraser	(Sweden) Jonas Leandersson
10	(Finland) Vuokatti	Long	June 11	(Russia) Leonid Novikov	(France) Thierry Gueorgiou	(Sweden) Gustav Bergman
11	(Finland) Vuokatti	Middle	July 13	(France) Thierry Gueorgiou	(Finland) Jani Lakanen	(Latvia) Edgars Bertuks
12	(Switzerland) Baden	Middle	October 5	(Switzerland) Daniel Hubmann	(Switzerland) Matthias Kyburz	(Switzerland) Andreas Kyburz
13	(Switzerland) Baden	Sprint	October 6	(Switzerland) Matthias Kyburz	(Switzerland) Martin Hubmann	(Sweden) Jonas Leandersson

== External sources ==
- World Cup Overall Results
- International Orienteering Federation
