= 2012 World Orienteering Championships =

2012 edition of the World Orienteering Championships

World Orienteering Championships 2012
- Host city: Lausanne
- Country: Switzerland
- Nations: 46
- Opening: 14 July 2012
- Closing: 21 July 2012
- Website: woc2012.ch

The 29th World Orienteering Championships was held in Lausanne, Switzerland, from 14 to 21 July 2012.

== Medalists ==
=== Men ===
Event	Gold	Silver	Bronze
Sprint	Matthias Kyburz; Switzerland	Matthias Merz; Switzerland	Matthias Müller; Switzerland
Middle distance	Edgars Bertuks; Latvia	Valentin Novikov; Russia	Fabian Hertner; Switzerland
Long distance	Olav Lundanes; Norway	Matthias Merz; Switzerland	Edgars Bertuks; Latvia
Relay	Czech Republic; Tomáš Dlabaja; Jan Šedivý; Jan Procházka	Norway; Magne Daehli; Carl Waaler Kaas; Olav Lundanes	Sweden; Jonas Leandersson; Peter Öberg; Anders Holmberg

=== Women ===
Event	Gold	Silver	Bronze
Sprint	Simone Niggli-Luder; Switzerland	Maja Alm; Denmark	Annika Billstam; Sweden
Middle distance	Minna Kauppi; Finland	Tove Alexandersson; Sweden	Tatyana Riabkina; Russia
Long distance	Simone Niggli-Luder; Switzerland	Minna Kauppi; Finland	Annika Billstam; Sweden
Relay	Switzerland; Ines Brodmann; Judith Wyder; Simone Niggli-Luder	Sweden; Annika Billstam; Helena Jansson; Tove Alexandersson	Norway; Silje Ekroll Jahren; Mari Fasting; Anne Margrethe Hausken Nordberg

== Participating countries ==
A total of 46 countries participated at this World Championships.

- Argentina
- Australia
- Austria
- Belarus
- Belgium
- Brazil
- Bulgaria
- Canada
- China
- Chinese Taipei
- Croatia
- Czech Republic
- DPR Korea
- Denmark
- Estonia
- Finland
- France
- Germany
- Great Britain
- Hong Kong
- Ireland
- Italy
- Japan
- Latvia
- Liechtenstein
- Lithuania
- Macedonia
- Moldova
- Netherlands
- New Zealand
- Norway
- Poland
- Portugal
- Romania
- Russia
- Serbia
- Slovakia
- Slovenia
- South Africa
- South Korea
- Spain
- Sweden
- Switzerland
- Turkey
- Ukraine
- United States

== Results ==
=== Sprint ===
The sprint finals were held on 14 July 2012 at Lausanne-Ouchy.

==== Men's sprint ====
WOC 2012 – Sprint final – Men (4.2 km)
Rank	Competitor	Nation	Time
1st place, gold medalist(s)	Matthias Kyburz	Switzerland	15:32.0
2nd place, silver medalist(s)	Matthias Merz	Switzerland	15:49.5
3rd place, bronze medalist(s)	Matthias Müller	Switzerland	15:59.0
4	Scott Fraser	Great Britain	16:11.2
5	Andrey Khramov	Russia	16:22.7
6	Tuomo Mäkelä	Finland	16:32.9
7	Jonas Vytautas Gvildys	Lithuania	16:33.8
8	Zsolt Lenkei	Hungary	16:39.5
9	Søren Bobach	Denmark	16:43.7
10	Vojtìch Král	Czech Republic	16:45.0
11	Murray Strain	Great Britain	16:46.1
12	Anders Holmberg	Sweden	16:49.9
13	Jerker Lysell	Sweden	16:51.2
14	Ionut Zinca	Romania	16:52.7
15	Jonas Leandersson	Sweden	16:59.2
16	Tomáš Dlabaja	Czech Republic	16:59.5
17	Wojciech Kowalski	Poland	17:02.5
18	Vincent Coupat	France	17:04.2
19	Alexey Sidorov	Russia	17:05.2
20	Rasmus Thrane Hansen	Denmark	17:07.7
21	Robert Merl	Austria	17:08.2
22	Ádám Kovács	Hungary	17:12.7
23	Tuomas Tervo	Finland	17:15.4
24	Andreu Blanes Reig	Spain	17:21.0
25	Vilius Aleliunas	Lithuania	17:28.1
26	Jan Procházka	Czech Republic	17:30.0
27	Nicolas Simonin	Ireland	17:35.2
28	Alexander Lubina	Germany	17:37.4
29	Ulf Forseth Indgaard	Norway	17:38.0
30	Antonio Martínez	Spain	17:42.2
31	Yannick Michiels	Belgium	17:43.1
32	Julian Dent	Australia	17:50.3
33	Tim Robertson	New Zealand	17:51.7
34	Simonas Krepsta	Lithuania	17:52.4
35	Ivaylo Kamenarov	Bulgaria	17:54.4
36	Patrick Goeres	Canada	17:54.7
36	Ross Morrison	New Zealand	17:54.7
38	Dmitry Nakonechny	Russia	17:55.4
39	David Brickhill-Jones	Australia	18:00.6
40	Wolfgang Siegert	Austria	18:01.2
41	Robert Krüger	Germany	18:11.0
42	Klaus Schgaguler	Italy	18:13.2
43	Michael Crone	South Africa	18:41.3
	Kiril Nikolov	Bulgaria	miss 1 punch
	Frederic Tranchand	France	miss 1 punch

==== Women's sprint ====
WOC 2012 – Sprint final – Women (3.7 km)
Rank	Competitor	Nation	Time
1st place, gold medalist(s)	Simone Niggli-Luder	Switzerland	15:43.7
2nd place, silver medalist(s)	Maja Alm	Denmark	16:20.2
3rd place, bronze medalist(s)	Annika Billstam	Sweden	16:28.0
4	Helena Jansson	Sweden	16:30.2
5	Rahel Friederich	Switzerland	16:33.1
6	Venla Niemi	Finland	16:39.4
7	Claire Ward	Great Britain	16:49.4
8	Lena Eliasson	Sweden	16:56.9
9	Lizzie Ingham	New Zealand	17:07.2
10	Silje Ekroll Jahren	Norway	17:12.8
11	Tessa Hill	Great Britain	17:14.4
12	Signe Klinting	Denmark	17:18.2
13	Shuangyan Hao	China	17:25.4
14	Fanni Gyurkó	Hungary	17:33.6
14	Marika Teini	Finland	17:33.6
16	Judith Wyder	Switzerland	17:36.7
17	Heidi Østlid Bagstevold	Norway	17:37.1
18	Iveta Duchová	Czech Republic	17:39.0
19	Ausrine Kutkaite	Lithuania	17:44.9
20	Alison Crocker	United States	17:47.3
21	Svetlana Mironova	Russia	17:47.7
22	Ursula Kadan	Austria	18:01.2
23	Anastasiya Tikhonova	Russia	18:02.9
24	Greta Knarston	New Zealand	18:05.0
25	Anne Margrethe Hausken Nordberg	Norway	18:06.3
26	Inga Kazlauskaite	Lithuania	18:19.1
27	Kim Geypen	Belgium	18:26.9
28	Ildikó Szerencsi	Hungary	18:31.1
29	Hanna Wisniewska	Poland	18:33.8
30	Daria Lajn	Poland	18:35.1
31	Antoniya Grigorova-Burgova	Bulgaria	18:37.8
32	Gabija Ražaityte	Lithuania	18:39.9
33	Sofia Haajanen	Finland	18:46.9
34	Mikiko Minagawa	Japan	18:52.8
35	Celine Dodin	France	19:05.8
36	Lea Vercellotti	France	19:07.5
37	Mingyue Zhu	China	19:24.1
38	Catherine Taylor	Great Britain	19:29.4
39	Amélie Chataing	France	19:40.5
40	Esther Doetsch	Germany	20:03.7
41	Yingwei Wang	China	20:28.6
42	Raquel Costa	Portugal	21:19.7
43	Nataliya Dimitrova	Bulgaria	23:10.0
	Eva Jureníková	Czech Republic	miss 1 punch
	Annika Rihma	Estonia	miss 1 punch

=== Middle distance ===
The middle distance finals were held on 17 July 2012 at St-Cergue / La Givrine.

==== Men's middle distance ====
WOC 2012 – Middle distance final – Men (6.5 km)
Rank	Competitor	Nation	Time
1st place, gold medalist(s)	Edgars Bertuks	Latvia	36:45
2nd place, silver medalist(s)	Valentin Novikov	Russia	36:50
3rd place, bronze medalist(s)	Fabian Hertner	Switzerland	37:10
4	Thierry Gueorgiou	France	37:15
5	Francois Gonon	France	37:18
6	Peter Öberg	Sweden	37:22
7	Magne Daehli	Norway	38:08
8	Gustav Bergman	Sweden	38:33
9	Marc Lauenstein	Switzerland	38:48
10	Jan Procházka	Czech Republic	39:01
11	Hannu Airila	Finland	39:02
11	Oleksandr Kratov	Ukraine	39:02
13	Kalvis Mihailovs	Latvia	39:10
14	Olav Lundanes	Norway	39:19
15	Philippe Adamski	France	39:26
16	Lauri Sild	Estonia	39:42
17	Pasi Ikonen	Finland	39:46
18	Johan Runesson	Sweden	39:49
19	Leonid Novikov	Russia	40:01
20	Gernot Kerschbaumer	Austria	40:19
21	Mārtiņš Sirmais	Latvia	40:22
22	Carl Waaler Kaas	Norway	40:24
23	Pavlo Ushkvarok	Ukraine	40:25
24	Lucas Basset	France	40:30
25	Tue Lassen	Denmark	40:33
26	Robert Merl	Austria	41:03
27	Olle Kärner	Estonia	41:05
27	Štanfel Matjaž	Croatia	41:05
29	Jonas Vytautas Gvildys	Lithuania	41:07
30	Mikhail Mamleev	Italy	41:11
31	Vojtìch Král	Czech Republic	41:21
32	Zsolt Lenkei	Hungary	41:40
33	Simonas Krėpšta	Lithuania	41:42
34	Jarkko Huovila	Finland	42:27
34	Michal Krajčík	Slovakia	42:27
36	Graham Gristwood	Great Britain	42:48
37	Aleksei Alekseyonok	Belarus	43:28
38	Ionut Zinca	Romania	43:37
39	Ross Morrison	New Zealand	44:04
40	Bjarne Friedrichs	Germany	45:53
41	Ivaylo Kamenarov	Bulgaria	46:41
42	Yury Tambasov	Belarus	47:25
43	Fabien Pasquasy	Belgium	51:15
	Søren Bobach	Denmark	dropout (dnf)
	Baptiste Rollier	Switzerland	dropout (dnf)

==== Women's middle distance ====
WOC 2012 – Middle distance final – Women (5.5 km)
Rank	Competitor	Nation	Time
1st place, gold medalist(s)	Minna Kauppi	Finland	37:37
2nd place, silver medalist(s)	Tove Alexandersson	Sweden	38:09
3rd place, bronze medalist(s)	Tatyana Riabkina	Russia	39:03
4	Ida Bobach	Denmark	39:52
5	Simone Niggli-Luder	Switzerland	40:00
6	Annika Billstam	Sweden	40:07
7	Sara Lüscher	Switzerland	40:53
8	Merja Rantanen	Finland	41:03
9	Inga Dambe	Latvia	41:15
10	Saila Kinni	Finland	41:24
11	Lina Strand	Sweden	42:04
12	Kristina Rybakovaitė	Lithuania	43:17
12	Dana Šafka Brožková	Czech Republic	43:17
14	Fanni Gyurkó	Hungary	43:38
15	Anastasia Trubkina	Russia	43:46
16	Nadiya Volynska	Ukraine	43:51
17	Heidi Østlid Bagstevold	Norway	44:17
18	Amélie Chataing	France	44:33
19	Iveta Duchová	Czech Republic	44:37
20	Judith Wyder	Switzerland	44:41
21	Rachael Rothman	Great Britain	45:22
22	Signe Klinting	Denmark	45:26
22	Claire Ward	Great Britain	45:26
24	Aija Skrastiņa	Latvia	45:29
25	Gabija Ražaitytė	Lithuania	45:46
26	Helen Palmer	Great Britain	45:58
27	Inga Kazlauskaite	Lithuania	46:10
28	Maja Alm	Denmark	47:22
29	Mari Fasting	Norway	47:24
30	Ida Marie Ness Bjorgul	Norway	47:47
31	Vanessa Round	Australia	47:58
32	Ursula Kadan	Austria	47:59
33	Anna Serrallonga Arqués	Spain	48:26
33	Elisa Elstner	Austria	48:26
35	Kirti Rebane	Estonia	50:11
36	Anja Arbter	Austria	50:50
37	Shuangyan Hao	China	50:59
38	Hanna Wisniewska	Poland	51:13
39	Lizzie Ingham	New Zealand	53:01
40	Ona Rafols Perramón	Spain	53:14
41	Louise Oram	Canada	53:31
42	Liis Johanson	Estonia	53:58
43	Christine Kirchlechner	Italy	54:34
44	Iliana Shandurkova	Bulgaria	54:53
45	Christiane Tröße	Germany	55:10

=== Long distance ===
The long distance finals were held on 19 July 2012 at Chalet-à-Gobet.

==== Men's long distance ====
WOC 2012 – Long distance final – Men (18.3 km)
Rank	Competitor	Nation	Time
1st place, gold medalist(s)	Olav Lundanes	Norway	1:34:42
2nd place, silver medalist(s)	Matthias Merz	Switzerland	1:37:34
3rd place, bronze medalist(s)	Edgars Bertuks	Latvia	1:39:13
4	Philippe Adamski	France	1:40:19
5	Anders Holmberg	Sweden	1:41:46
6	Kiril Nikolov	Bulgaria	1:41:48
7	Dmitriy Tsvetkov	Russia	1:43:20
8	Frederic Tranchand	France	1:43:55
9	Tue Lassen	Denmark	1:44:46
10	Anders Nordberg	Norway	1:44:51
11	Yury Tambasov	Belarus	1:44:57
12	Jan Šedivý	Czech Republic	1:45:08
13	Mikhail Mamleev	Italy	1:45:11
14	Fredric Portin	Finland	1:45:23
15	Gernot Kerschbaumer	Austria	1:45:39
16	Kalvis Mihailovs	Latvia	1:46:32
17	Hans Gunnar Omdal	Norway	1:47:18
18	Tomáš Dlabaja	Czech Republic	1:47:24
19	Matthias Kyburz	Switzerland	1:47:28
20	Scott Fraser	Great Britain	1:48:31
21	Vytautas Beliūnas	Lithuania	1:48:59
22	Ádám Kovács	Hungary	1:49:22
23	Rasmus Djurhuus	Denmark	1:50:06
24	Ionut Zinca	Romania	1:50:37
25	Vilius Aleliunas	Lithuania	1:51:36
26	Bartosz Pawlak	Poland	1:52:02
27	Pavlo Ushkvarok	Ukraine	1:52:04
28	Erik Rost	Sweden	1:52:22
29	Rasmus Thrane Hansen	Denmark	1:52:52
30	Julian Dent	Australia	1:54:18
31	Tuomas Tervo	Finland	1:54:42
32	Stepan Kodeda	Czech Republic	1:55:21
33	Diogo Miguel	Portugal	1:55:24
34	Alessio Tenani	Italy	1:55:48
35	Aleksei Alekseyonok	Belarus	1:56:42
36	Yannick Michiels	Belgium	1:57:21
37	Artem Panchenko	Ukraine	1:57:43
38	Peeter Pihl	Estonia	1:57:50
39	Nicolas Simonin	Ireland	1:58:54
	Gustav Bergman	Sweden	miss 1 punch
	Fabian Hertner	Switzerland	punch 1 wrong
	Andrey Khramov	Russia	dropout (dnf)
	Wojciech Kowalski	Poland	miss 1 punch
	Valentin Novikov	Russia	dropout (dnf)
	Lauri Sild	Estonia	miss 1 punch

==== Women's long distance ====
WOC 2012 – Long distance final – Women (12.4 km)
Rank	Competitor	Nation	Time
1st place, gold medalist(s)	Simone Niggli-Luder	Switzerland	1:15:07
2nd place, silver medalist(s)	Minna Kauppi	Finland	1:16.38
3rd place, bronze medalist(s)	Annika Billstam	Sweden	1:17:13
4	Tatyana Riabkina	Russia	1:19:17
5	Anne Margrethe Hausken Nordberg	Norway	1:20:05
6	Eva Juřeníková	Czech Republic	1:21:10
7	Merja Rantanen	Finland	1:22:51
8	Ida Bobach	Denmark	1:23:22
9	Ines Brodmann	Switzerland	1:23:23
10	Venla Niemi	Finland	1:23:35
11	Sara Lüscher	Switzerland	1:24:04
12	Lina Strand	Sweden	1:25:15
13	Svetlana Mironova	Russia	1:25:38
14	Mari Fasting	Norway	1:26:10
15	Fanni Gyurkó	Hungary	1:26:38
16	Celine Dodin	France	1:27:31
17	Vendula Klechová	Czech Republic	1:28:40
18	Tone Wigemyr	Norway	1:28:52
19	Dana Šafka Brožková	Czech Republic	1:29:03
20	Signe Klinting	Denmark	1:29:26
21	Inga Dambe	Latvia	1:29:30
22	Ursula Kadan	Austria	1:29:43
23	Daria Lajn	Poland	1:31:36
24	Annika Rihma	Estonia	1:32:04
25	Claire Ward	Great Britain	1:32:17
26	Anastasiya Tikhonova	Russia	1:32:19
27	Ausrine Kutkaite	Lithuania	1:32:41
28	Ildikó Szerencsi	Hungary	1:35:08
29	Nadiya Volynska	Ukraine	1:35:11
30	Kristina Rybakovaitė	Lithuania	1:35:21
31	Olga Sluta	Ukraine	1:35:50
32	Miek Fabré	Belgium	1:36:26
33	Louise Oram	Canada	1:37:48
34	Lea Vercellotti	France	1:38:38
35	Aislinn Prendergast	Australia	1:39:58
36	Helen Bridle	Great Britain	1:41:01
37	Sarah Rollins	Great Britain	1:41:02
38	Inga Kazlauskaite	Lithuania	1:41:23
39	Anna Serrallonga Arqués	Spain	1:41:32
40	Samantha Saeger	United States	1:41:39
41	Kim Geypen	Belgium	1:43:48
42	Kirti Rebane	Estonia	1:48:38
43	Elisa Elstner	Austria	1:52:08
44	Antoniya Grigorova-Burgova	Bulgaria	1:56:52
	Lena Eliasson	Sweden	dropout (dnf)

=== Relay ===
The relay events were held on 21 July 2012 at Chalet-à-Gobet.

==== Men's relay ====
WOC 2012 – Relay – Men (6.9 + 6.9 + 6.9 km)
Rank	Nation	Competitors	Time
1st place, gold medalist(s)	Czech Republic	Tomáš Dlabaja, Jan Šedivý, Jan Procházka	1:40:00
2nd place, silver medalist(s)	Norway	Magne Daehli, Carl Waaler Kaas, Olav Lundanes	1:40:06
3rd place, bronze medalist(s)	Sweden	Jonas Leandersson, Peter Öberg, Anders Holmberg	1:40:11
4	Switzerland	Fabian Hertner, Matthias Müller, Matthias Merz	1:41:21
5	France	Philippe Adamski, Thierry Gueorgiou, Francois Gonon	1:42:56
6	Denmark	Søren Bobach, Rasmus Thrane Hansen, Tue Lassen	1:43:08
7	Latvia	Mārtiņš Sirmais, Kalvis Mihailovs, Edgars Bertuks	1:45:31
8	Lithuania	Vilius Aleliunas, Simonas Krėpšta, Jonas Vytautas Gvildys	1:45:42
9	Ukraine	Pavlo Ushkvarok, Oleksandr Kratov, Denys Shcherbakov	1:47:01
10	Poland	Bartosz Pawlak, Michal Olejnik, Wojciech Kowalski	1:47:58
11	Italy	Klaus Schgaguler, Alessio Tenani, Mikhail Mamleev	1:48:08
12	Austria	Robert Merl, Helmut Gremmel, Gernot Kerschbaumer	1:48:38
13	Belgium	Tomas Hendrickx, Fabien Pasquasy, Yannick Michiels	1:49:34
14	Slovakia	Pavol Bukovác, Michal Krajčík, Marián Dávidík	1:49:53
15	Finland	Tuomas Tervo, Hannu Airila, Fredric Portin	1:50:09
16	Great Britain	Mark Nixon, Matthew Speake, Scott Fraser	1:50:45
17	Estonia	Peeter Pihl, Olle Kärner, Lauri Sild	1:51:02
18	Spain	Antonio Martínez, Luis Nogueira de La Muela, Andreu Blanes Reig	1:52:00
19	Hungary	Máté Baumholczer, Zsolt Lenkei, Ádám Kovács	1:53:39
20	Belarus	Yury Tambasov, Aleksei Alekseyonok, Dmitry Mikhalkin	1:53:53
21	Bulgaria	Kiril Nikolov, Ivaylo Kamenarov, Ivan Sirakov	1:54:21
22	Australia	David Brickhill-Jones, Simon Uppill, Julian Dent	1:55:45
23	Germany	Christoph Brandt, Bjarne Friedrichs, Sören Lösch	1:57:29
24	Portugal	Miguel Silva, Diogo Miguel, Manuel Horta	2:00:58
25	New Zealand	Ross Morrison, Thomas Reynolds, Toby Scott	2:04:42
26	Ireland	Nicolas Simonin, Colm Hill, Darren Burke	2:07:12
27	Brazil	Leandro Pereira Pasturiza, Fábio Kuczkoski, Ronaldo Almeida	2:11:35
28	Canada	Patrick Goeres, Robbie Anderson, Will Critchley	2:18:01
29	USA	Eric Bone, Boris Granovskiy, Giacomo Barbone	2:22:11
30	Turkey	Ahmet Kaçmaz, Musa Erdoğan, Fatih Bodur	2:23:32
31	Japan	Shigeyuki Koizumi, Toshiyuki Matsuzawa, Wataru Teragauchi	2:25:30
32	China	Xiyuan Liang, Zhihui Yi, Qiaoping Li	2:40:32
33	Hong Kong	Chi Kin Man, Gerald Yip, Chun Kit Tang	3:13:09
	Russia	Andrey Khramov, Dmitriy Tsvetkov, Valentin Novikov	disqualified
	South Korea	Byung-Gu Ryu, Geun-Hee Hong, Jong-Hyun Park	disqualified

==== Women's relay ====
WOC 2012 – Relay – Women (5.9 + 5.9 + 5.9 km)
Rank	Nation	Competitors	Time
1st place, gold medalist(s)	Switzerland	Ines Brodmann, Judith Wyder, Simone Niggli-Luder	1:44:54
2nd place, silver medalist(s)	Sweden	Annika Billstam, Helena Jansson, Tove Alexandersson	1:47:18
3rd place, bronze medalist(s)	Norway	Silje Ekroll Jahren, Mari Fasting, Anne Margrethe Hausken Nordberg	1:48:11
4	Russia	Anastasiya Tikhonova, Svetlana Mironova, Tatyana Riabkina	1:48:38
5	Finland	Venla Niemi, Merja Rantanen, Minna Kauppi	1:51:41
6	Denmark	Emma Klingenberg, Ida Bobach, Maja Alm	1:52:21
7	France	Celine Dodin, Lea Vercellotti, Amélie Chataing	1:53:13
8	Czech Republic	Iveta Duchova, Dana Šafka Brožková, Eva Juřeníková	1:59:54
9	Estonia	Kirti Rebane, Liis Johanson, Annika Rihma	2:00:24
10	Great Britain	Sarah Rollins, Claire Ward, Catherine Taylor	2:00:33
11	Ukraine	Anastasiia Danylova, Nadiya Volynska, Olga Reznichenko	2:01:02
12	Poland	Paulina Faron, Daria Lajn, Hanna Wisniewska	2:03:38
13	Lithuania	Kristina Rybakovaitė, Gabija Ražaitytė, Ausrine Kutkaite	2:03:52
14	Hungary	Fanni Gyurkó, Éva Novai, Ildikó Szerencsi	2:04:06
15	USA	Alison Crocker, Sandra Lauenstein, Samantha Saeger	2:05:19
16	Austria	Ursula Kadan, Elisa Elstner, Anja Arbter	2:07:16
17	China	Mingyue Zhu, Yingwei Wang, Shuangyan Hao	2:09:39
18	Germany	Esther Doetsch, Christiane Tröße, Sieglinde Kundisch	2:09:56
19	New Zealand	Lizzie Ingham, Kate Morrison, Amber Morrison	2:14:34
20	Italy	Carlotta Scalet, Maria Novella Sbaraglia, Christine Kirchlechner	2:14:47
21	Bulgaria	Nataliya Dimitrova, Iliana Shandurkova, Antoniya Grigorova-Burgova	2:15:56
22	Australia	Rachel Effeney, Aislinn Prendergast, Vanessa Round	2:17:53
23	Spain	Ona Rafols Perramón, Berta Meseguer Flaqué, Anna Serrallonga Arqués	2:21:15
24	Turkey	Tuğba Cın, Selvihan Günaydin, Şengűl Űzen	2:57:58
25	Hong Kong	Tsz Ying Yu, Pui Fung Chan, Yuen Ki Hilda Cheng	3:20:15
	Belarus	Nastsia Klapouskaya, Maria Alekseyonok, Irina Yurok	disqualified
	Latvia	Laura Vīķe, Aija Skrastiņa, Inga Dambe	disqualified
