= Orienteering at the 2013 World Games =

- Venue: Del Departamento Club
- Dates: 2–4 August 2013
- Competitors: 175 from 24 nations

Orienteering was contested at the 2013 World Games in Cali, Colombia from 2 to 4 August 2013. Medals were awarded for five different events, all held at the Del Departamento Club.

== Participating nations ==
- Australia (2)
- Austria (9)
- Brazil (9)
- Bulgaria (2)
- China (9)
- Colombia (9)
- Czech Republic (9)
- Denmark (9)
- Estonia (2)
- Finland (2)
- France (9)
- Great Britain (9)
- Hungary (9)
- Latvia (11)
- Lithuania (9)
- Norway (9)
- New Zealand (9)
- Poland (4)
- South Africa (2)
- Russia (9)
- Switzerland (11)
- Sweden (9)
- Ukraine (4)
- United States (9)

== Medal table ==
Rank	Nation	Gold	Silver	Bronze	Total
1	Switzerland (SUI)	3	1	0	4
2	Sweden (SWE)	1	2	0	3
3	Finland (FIN)	1	0	0	1
4	Denmark (DEN)	0	1	1	2
5	Norway (NOR)	0	1	0	1
6	Austria (AUT)	0	0	1	1
6	Lithuania (LTU)	0	0	1	1
6	Russia (RUS)	0	0	1	1
6	Ukraine (UKR)	0	0	1	1
Totals (9 entries)		5	5	5	15

== Events ==
=== Men ===
Event	Gold	Silver	Bronze
Sprint	Matthias Kyburz; Switzerland	Andrey Khramov; Russia	Jerker Lysell; Sweden
Middle distance	Matthias Kyburz; Switzerland	Daniel Hubmann; Switzerland	Vilius Aleliunas; Lithuania

=== Women ===
Event	Gold	Silver	Bronze
Sprint	Annika Billstam; Sweden	Anne Margrethe Hausken Nordberg; Norway	Maja Alm; Denmark
Middle distance	Minna-Mari Kauppi; Finland	Tove Alexandersson; Sweden	Nadiya Volynska; Ukraine

=== Mixed ===
Event	Gold	Silver	Bronze
Team relay	Daniel Hubmann; Sara Lüscher; Matthias Kyburz; Judith Wyder; Switzerland	Tue Agner Hjort Lassen; Ida Bobach; Rasmus Thrane Hansen; Maja Alm; Denmark	Gernot Kerschbaumer; Anna Nilsson Simkovics; Robert Merl; Ursula Kadan; Austria
