= Orienteering at the 2009 World Games – Men's sprint =

Orienteering men's sprint at the 2009 World Games
- Venue: Kaohsiung Museum of Fine Arts
- Location: Kaohsiung, Taiwan
- Date: 17 July 2009
- Competitors: 36 from 18 nations

Medalists
| gold medal | (Russia) Andrey Khramov |
| silver medal | (Switzerland) Daniel Hubmann |
| bronze medal | (Finland) Tero Föhr |

The men's sprint competition in orienteering at the 2009 World Games took place on 17 July 2009 at the Kaohsiung Museum of Fine Arts in Kaohsiung, Taiwan.

== Competition format ==
A total of 36 athletes entered the competition. Every athlete had to check in at control points, which were located across the course.

== Results ==
| Rank | Athlete | Nation | Time |
|---|---|---|---|
| 1st place, gold medalist(s) | Andrey Khramov | Russia | 13:11.2 |
| 2nd place, silver medalist(s) | Daniel Hubmann | Switzerland | 13:12.8 |
| 3rd place, bronze medalist(s) | Tero Föhr | Finland | 13:46.5 |
| 4 | Øystein Kvaal Østerbø | Norway | 13:49.1 |
| 5 | Matthias Müller | Switzerland | 14:00.7 |
| 6 | Lars Skjeset | Norway | 14:07.2 |
| 7 | Peter Öberg | Sweden | 14:10.4 |
| 8 | Mattias Millinger | Sweden | 14:11.7 |
| 9 | Tomáš Dlabaja | Czech Republic | 14:12.6 |
| 10 | Ross Morrison | New Zealand | 14:29.8 |
| 11 | Pasi Ikonen | Finland | 14:30.1 |
| 12 | Andreas Rüedlinger | Switzerland | 14:32.4 |
| 13 | Jonas Vytautas Gvildys | Lithuania | 14:32.9 |
| 14 | Mikkel Lund | Denmark | 14:35.7 |
| 15 | Dmitry Tsvetkov | Russia | 14:40.6 |
| 16 | Scott Fraser | Great Britain | 14:41.2 |
| 17 | Simon Uppill | Australia | 14:41.6 |
| 18 | Simonas Krėpšta | Lithuania | 14:42.3 |
| 19 | Mārtiņš Sirmais | Latvia | 14:42.7 |
| 20 | Pavol Bukovác | Slovakia | 14:46.0 |
| 21 | Alexey Bortnik | Russia | 15:02.4 |
| 22 | Julian Dent | Australia | 15:03.2 |
| 23 | Lukáš Barták | Slovakia | 15:12.9 |
| 24 | Rasmus Søes | Denmark | 15:17.1 |
| 25 | David Brickhill-Jones | Great Britain | 15:22.0 |
| 26 | Jan Šedivý | Czech Republic | 15:25.2 |
| 27 | Edgars Bertuks | Latvia | 15:27.3 |
| 28 | Jean Baptiste Bourrin | France | 15:35.4 |
| 29 | Chen Cheng-hsiung | Chinese Taipei | 15:38.8 |
| 30 | Darren Ashmore | New Zealand | 15:44.8 |
| 31 | Clement Valla | France | 15:58.0 |
| 32 | Hiroyuki Kato | Japan | 16:08.4 |
| 33 | Shigeyuki Koizumi | Japan | 16:32.5 |
| 34 | Nicholas Mulder | South Africa | 17:24.6 |
| 35 | Wu Ming-yen | Chinese Taipei | 17:46.9 |
| | Michael Smith | Canada | DSQ |
