= 2011 World Orienteering Championships =

2011 edition of the World Orienteering Championships

- Host city: Savoie
- Country: France
- Events: 8

The 2011 World Orienteering Championships, the 28th World Orienteering Championships, were held in Savoie, France, 13 –20 August 2011.

The championships had eight events; sprint for men and women, middle distance for men and women, long distance (formerly called individual or classic distance) for men and women, and relays for men and women.

== Medalists ==
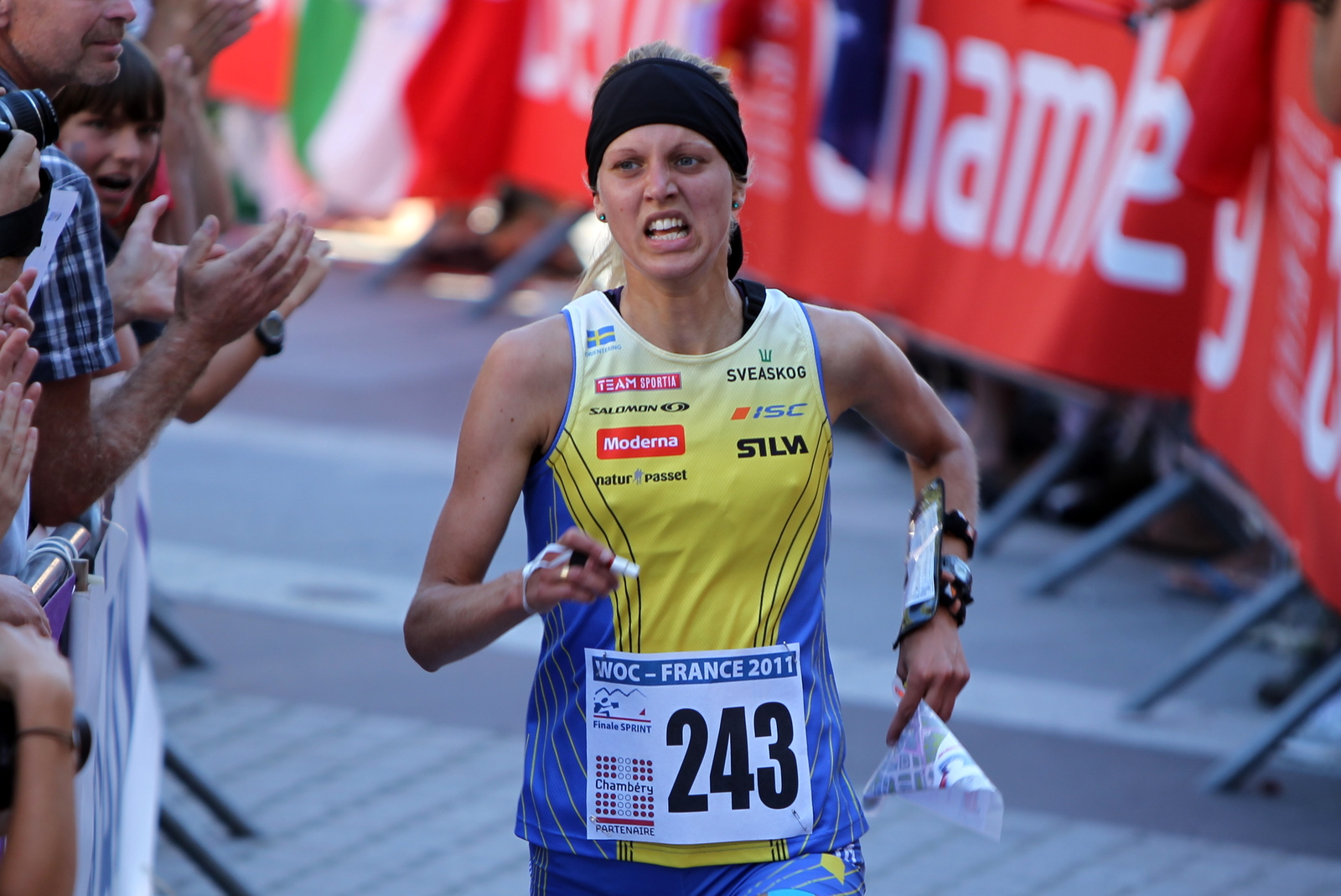
Gold medalist Gustafsson in the sprint final.

Event	Gold		Silver		Bronze	
Men's sprint	Daniel Hubmann (SUI)	13:11.8	Anders Holmberg (SWE)	13:37.8	Matthias Müller (SUI)	13:41.2
Women's sprint	Linnea Gustafsson (SWE)	13:14.3	Helena Jansson (SWE)	13:22.7	Lena Eliasson (SWE)	13:28.5
Men's middle distance	Thierry Gueorgiou (FRA)	34:38	Peter Öberg (SWE)	36:59	Olav Lundanes (NOR)	37:01
Women's middle distance	Helena Jansson (SWE)	33:10	Ida Bobach (DEN)	34:26	Judith Wyder (SUI)	35:11
Men's long distance	Thierry Gueorgiou (FRA)	1:47:29	Pasi Ikonen (FIN)	1:51:56	François Gonon (FRA)	1:53:35
Women's long distance	Annika Billstam (SWE)	1:22:26	Dana Brožková (CZE)	1:26:54	Helena Jansson (SWE)	1:29:55
Men's relay	France (FRA): Philippe Adamski; François Gonon; Thierry Gueorgiou	1:53:48	Norway (NOR): Carl Waaler Kaas; Anders Nordberg; Olav Lundanes	1:57:02	Sweden (SWE): Anders Holmberg; Olle Boström; David Andersson	1:58:03
Women's relay	Finland (FIN): Anni-Maija Fincke; Merja Rantanen; Minna Kauppi	1:42:42	Czech Republic (CZE): Martina Zverinova; Eva Jurenikova; Dana Brozkova	1:42:43	Sweden (SWE): Helena Jansson; Tove Alexandersson; Annika Billstam	1:42:44

== Results ==
=== Women's middle distance ===
WOC 2011 – Middle – Women
Rank	Competitor	Nation	Time
1st place, gold medalist(s)	Helena Jansson	Sweden	33:10
2nd place, silver medalist(s)	Ida Bobach	Denmark	34:26
3rd place, bronze medalist(s)	Judith Wyder	Switzerland	35:11
4	Minna Kauppi	Finland	35:19
5	Nataliya Vinogradova	Russia	35:28
6	Maja Alm	Denmark	35:21
7	Marianne Andersen	Norway	35:49
8	Merja Rantanen	Finland	36:32
9	Annika Billstam	Sweden	36:42
10	Amélie Chataing	France	36:59

=== Men's long distance ===
WOC 2011 – Long – Men
Rank	Competitor	Nation	Time
1st place, gold medalist(s)	Thierry Gueorgiou	France	1:47:29
2nd place, silver medalist(s)	Pasi Ikonen	Finland	1:51:56
3rd place, bronze medalist(s)	François Gonon	France	1:53:35
4	Baptiste Rollier	Switzerland	1:55:26
5	Daniel Hubmann	Switzerland	1:57:05
6	Olle Boström	Sweden	1:57:40
7	Philippe Adamski	France	1:57:47
8	Marc Lauenstein	Switzerland	1:57:48
9	Tero Föhr	Finland	1:59:28
10	Olav Lundanes	Norway	1:59:43
11	Oleksandr Kratov	Ukraine	2:00:38
12	Dmitriy Tsvetkov	Russia	2:00:56
13	Alexey Bortnik	Russia	2:01:09
14	Valentin Novikov	Russia	2:04:59
15	Carl Waaler Kaas	Norway	2:05:27
16	Mikhail Mamleev	Italy	2:06:42

=== Women's long distance ===
WOC 2011 – Long – Women
Rank	Competitor	Nation	Time
1st place, gold medalist(s)	Annika Billstam	Sweden	1:22:26
2nd place, silver medalist(s)	Dana Brožková	Czech Republic	1:26:54
3rd place, bronze medalist(s)	Helena Jansson	Sweden	1:29:55
4	Eva Juřeníková	Czech Republic	1:30:58
5	Heidi Østlid Bagstevold	Norway	1:31:57
6	Anni-Maija Fincke	Finland	1:34:06
7	Signe Søes	Denmark	1:34:51
8	Merja Rantanen	Finland	1:35:56
9	Aija Skrastiņa	Latvia	1:36:34
10	Julia Novikova	Russia	1:37:05
11	Rahel Friederich	Switzerland	1:37:50
12	Tone Wigemyr	Norway	1:38:11
13	Lizzie Ingham	New Zealand	1:39:42
14	Nadiya Volynska	Ukraine	1:39:45
