= Olav Lundanes =

Norwegian orienteer (born 1987)

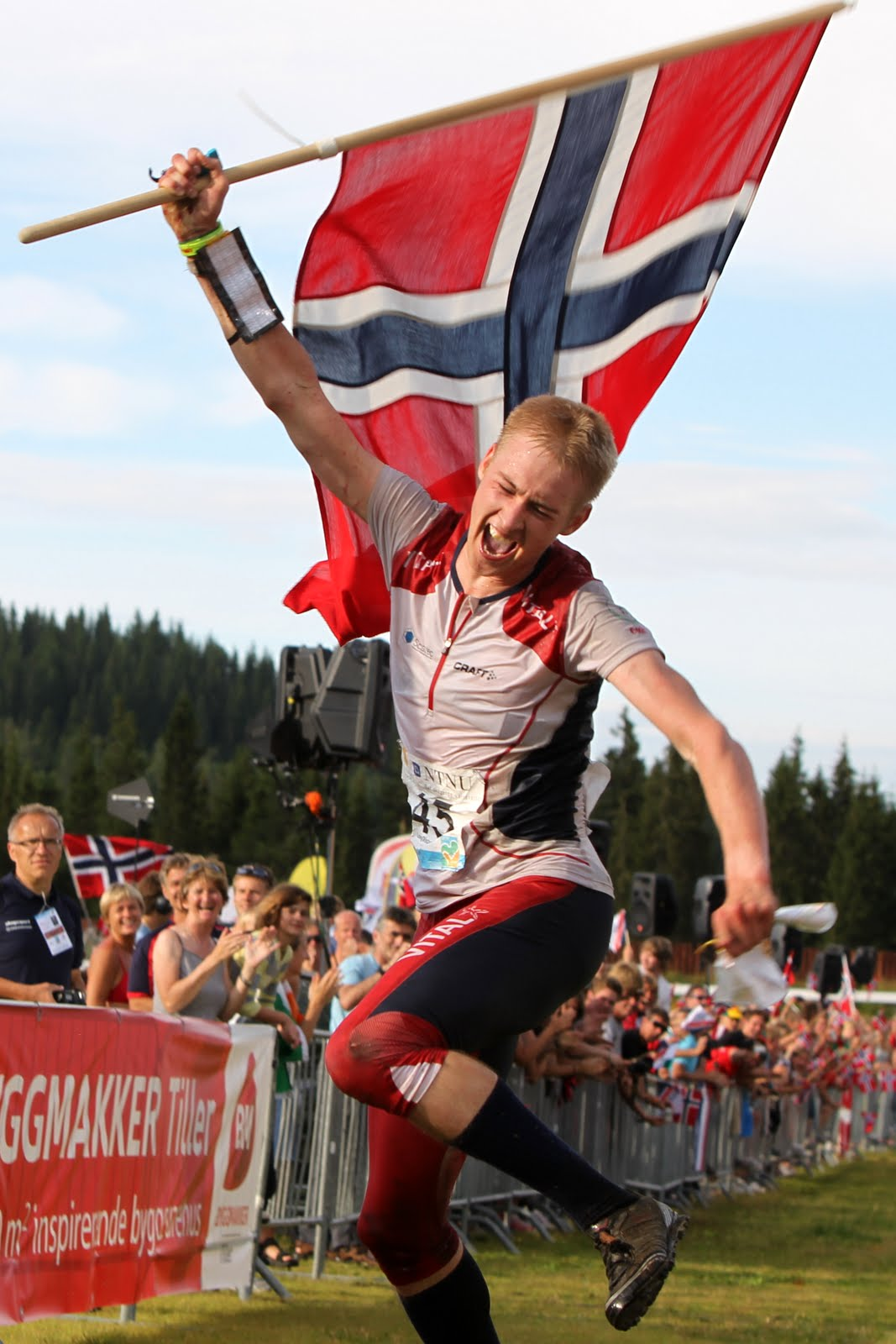
- Lundanes winning the Long Distance at WOC 2010

Personal information
- Born: 11 November 1987 (age 38) Ålesund

Sport
- Sport: Orienteering
- Club: Halden SK
Medal record
Men's orienteering
Representing Norway
World Championships
Gold medal – first place	2010 Trondheim	Long
Gold medal – first place	2012 Lausanne	Long
Gold medal – first place	2014 Asiago-Lavarone	Middle
Gold medal – first place	2016 Strömstad	Long
Gold medal – first place	2016 Strömstad	Relay
Gold medal – first place	2017 Tartu	Long
Gold medal – first place	2017 Tartu	Relay
Gold medal – first place	2018 Riga	Long
Gold medal – first place	2019 Østfold	Long
Gold medal – first place	2019 Østfold	Middle
Silver medal – second place	2010 Trondheim	Relay
Silver medal – second place	2011 Savoie	Relay
Silver medal – second place	2012 Lausanne	Relay
Silver medal – second place	2016 Strömstad	Middle
Bronze medal – third place	2011 Savoie	Middle
Bronze medal – third place	2014 Asiago-Lavarone	Long
Bronze medal – third place	2015 Inverness	Long
World Cup
Silver medal – second place	2012	World Cup Overall
Silver medal – second place	2017	World Cup Overall
Bronze medal – third place	2015	World Cup Overall
Bronze medal – third place	2016	World Cup Overall
Bronze medal – third place	2018	World Cup Overall
European Championships
Gold medal – first place	2012 Falun	Long
Gold medal – first place	2012 Falun	Middle
Gold medal – first place	2018 Ticino	Long
Gold medal – first place	2018 Ticino	Relay
Silver medal – second place	2014 Palmela	Long
Bronze medal – third place	2010 Primorsko	Relay
Bronze medal – third place	2018 Ticino	Middle
Junior World Championships
Gold medal – first place	2005 Tenero	Long
Gold medal – first place	2005 Tenero	Relay
Gold medal – first place	2007 Dubbo	Long
Gold medal – first place	2007 Dubbo	Middle
Silver medal – second place	2006 Druskininkai	Long
Silver medal – second place	2007 Dubbo	Sprint
Silver medal – second place	2007 Dubbo	Relay
Bronze medal – third place	2006 Druskininkai	Middle
Bronze medal – third place	2006 Druskininkai	Relay

Olav Lundanes (born 11 November 1987) is a Norwegian orienteering competitor, hailing from Ålesund. He has won gold medal at the World Orienteering Championships ten times and the European Orienteering Championships four times. He competes for Halden SK.

== Career ==
=== Junior ===
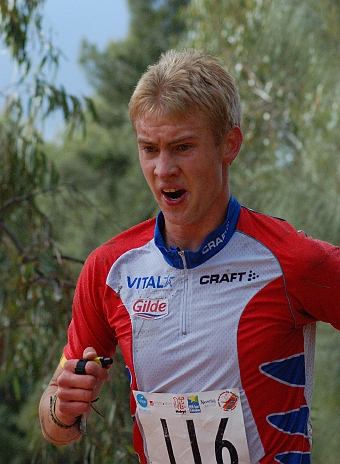
Lundanes at JWOC 2007

Lundanes competed at the 2005 Junior World Orienteering Championships in Tenero, where he won a gold medal in the long distance, a gold medal in the relay event, and placed fourth in the middle distance. He received a silver and two bronze medals in the 2006 Junior World Championships. In 2007 he had great success in the Junior World Championships, with victories in the long distance and the middle distance, and silver medals in both the sprint and the relay.

He has 11 victories in the national junior championships.

=== Senior ===
Lundanes debuted in World Championships at the 2007 World Orienteering Championships in Kyiv. At the 2008 European Orienteering Championships in Ventspils he finished 19th in the long distance.

He placed fourth in the sprint and 7th in the long distance at the 2009 World Orienteering Championships in Miskolc.

Lundanes won the long distance event in the World Orienteering Championships in 2010 in Trondheim. Later same week he won silver in the relay event together with Audun Weltzien and Carl Waaler Kaas.

In 2012 he won gold medal at the long distance in the World Championships in Lausanne, Switzerland. He ran the last leg on the Norwegian team who achieved their third consecutive silver medal in the relay.

In Asiago in 2014, Lundanes won his first World Championship gold in middle distance. Thierry Gueorgiou was first announced as the winner, but was later disqualified for undeliberatily skipping a control. At the same championships, Lundanes won a bronze medal at the long distance. He became third even in the following World Championship long distance event in Inverness, Great Britain.

At the 2016 World Orienteering Championships in Strömstad and Tanum he won a gold medal in the long distance. He won a silver medal in the middle distance, and was part of the Norwegian team which won the relay.

He won a gold medal in the long distance at the 2017 World Orienteering Championships, and also won the long distance in the 2018 and 2019 championships.

Lundanes has, as of the end of the 2018 season, not won the overall Orienteering World Cup. He finished second in 2012 and 2017 and third in 2015, 2016 and 2018.

He has 23 victories in the national championships (long 2009/2010/2011/2015/2016/2017/2018, middle 2010/2013/2017, night 2010/2012/2016, ultralong 2010/2012/2015/2016/2018, sprint 2012, relay 2009/2010/2016/2017)

== Results ==
=== World Championship results ===
Year
Year	Age	Long	Middle	Sprint	Relay	Sprint; Relay
2007	19	—	—	36	—	—N/a
2008	20	not selected: did not compete				
2009	21	7	—	4	—	—N/a
2010	22	Gold	—	—	Silver	—N/a
2011	23	10	Bronze	—	Silver	—N/a
2012	24	Gold	14	—	Silver	—N/a
2013	25	not selected: did not compete				
2014	26	Bronze	Gold	—	4	—
2015	27	Bronze	8	—	—	—
2016	28	Gold	Silver	—	Gold	—
2017	29	Gold	DSQ	—	Gold	—
2018	30	Gold	6	—	—	—
2019	31	Gold	Gold	—N/a	5	—N/a

=== World Cup victories ===
No.	Date	Venue	Distance
1	12 August 2010	(Norway) Trondheim	Long distance (WOC)
2	17 May 2012	(Sweden) Falun	Middle distance (EOC)
3	18 May 2012	(Sweden) Falun	Long distance (EOC)
4	19 July 2012	(Switzerland) Lausanne	Long distance (WOC)
5	1 September 2012	(Norway) Holmenkollen	Sprint
6	7 June 2014	(Norway) Kongsberg	Middle distance
7	11 July 2014	(Italy) Trentino	Middle distance (WOC)
8	30 April 2016	(Poland) Wrocław	Middle distance
9	25 August 2016	(Sweden) Tanum	Long distance (WOC)
10	4 July 2017	(Estonia) Tartu	Long distance (WOC)
11	25 August 2017	(Latvia) Cēsis	Middle distance
12	13 May 2018	(Switzerland) Ticino	Long distance (EOC)
13	11 August 2018	(Latvia) Sigulda	Long distance (WOC)
14	14 August 2019	(Norway) Østfold	Long distance (WOC)
15	16 August 2019	(Norway) Østfold	Middle distance (WOC)
