= Jan Procházka =

Jan Procházka may refer to:

- Jan Procházka (orienteer), Czech professional orienteering champion
- Jan Procházka (writer) (1929–1971), Czech writer
