= Pasi Ikonen =

Finnish orienteering competitor (1980–2024)

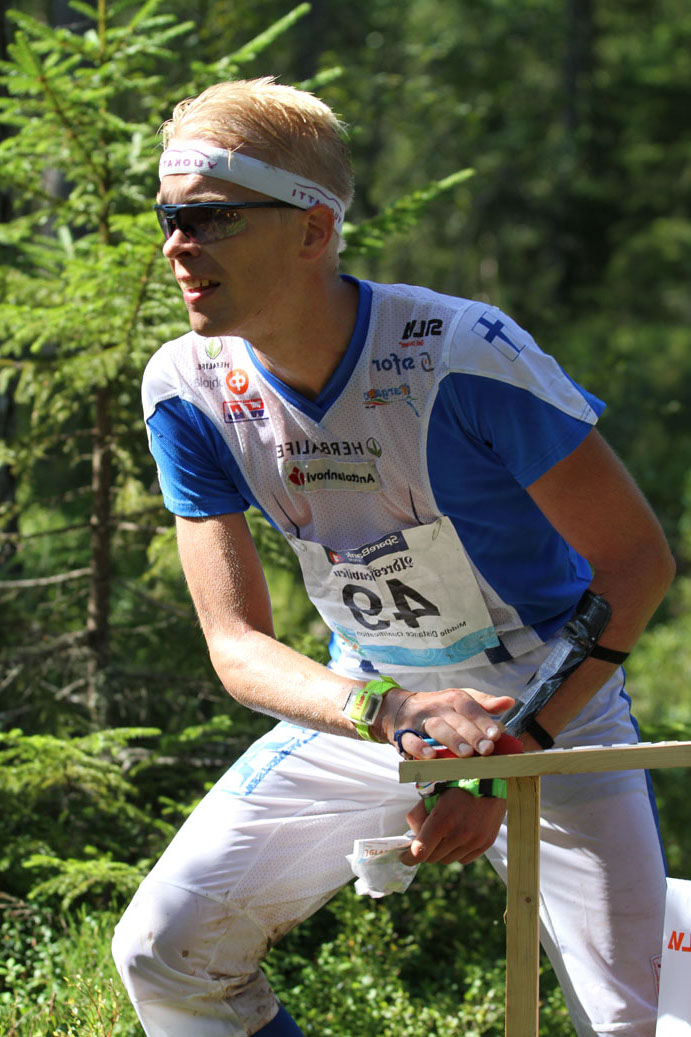
- Ikonen in 2010

Personal information
- Nationality: Finnish
- Born: 30 June 1980 Vihanti, Finland
- Died: 3 August 2024 (aged 44)

Sport
- Sport: Orienteering
- Club: SK-Pohjantähti; Vaajakosken Terä
Medal record
Men's orienteering
Representing Finland
World Championships
Gold medal – first place	2001 Tampere	Middle
Silver medal – second place	2001 Tampere	Sprint
Silver medal – second place	2011 Savoie	Long
Bronze medal – third place	2007 Kyiv	Relay
World Games
Silver medal – second place	2009 Kaohsiung	Mixed relay
European Championships
Gold medal – first place	2002 Hungary	Relay
Gold medal – first place	2004 Denmark	Relay
Bronze medal – third place	2008 Ventspils	Middle
Bronze medal – third place	2008 Ventspils	Relay
Junior World Championships
Gold medal – first place	1999 Varna	Relay
Silver medal – second place	1998 Reims	Relay
Silver medal – second place	2000 Nové Město na Moravě	Long
Bronze medal – third place	2000 Nové Město na Moravě	Relay

Pasi Ikonen (30 June 1980 – 3 August 2024) was a Finnish orienteering competitor, winner of the middle distance at the 2001 World Orienteering Championships. His other achievements include two individual silver medals at the world championships, and medals at the World Games and the European championships.

== Career ==
=== Junior years ===
Competing at the Junior World Orienteering Championships, Ikonen helped Finland win medals in the relay in 1998, 1999, and 2000, as well as winning an individual silver medal in the long distance in 2000.

In 1998 he was running the fourth leg in the Jukola relay for his club SK-Pohjantähti, which placed fourteenth in the relay. He placed second in the Jukola relay in 1999, and fifth in 2000.

=== Senior career ===
Ikonen won a gold medal in the short distance (later called middle distance) at the 2001 World Orienteering Championships in Tampere, ahead of Tore Sandvik and Jørgen Rostrup. He won a silver medal in the sprint at the same championships. In the Jukola relay in 2001 he was running the seventh leg for SK-Pohjantähti, which placed sixth in the relay.

In the 2002 Orienteering World Cup he achieved three race victories. They were the long distance in Chiny/Arlon in Belgium, the long distance in Tynset, Norway, and the middle distance in Idre, Sweden. He placed fourth overall in the cup in 2002. He won a gold medal in the relay with the Finnish team at the 2002 European Orienteering Championships in Sümeg, Hungary. Competing at the 2003 World Orienteering Championships, he placed fourth in the middle distance, and nineteenth in the sprint. He became Nordic champion in 2003, by winning the middle distance at the Open Nordic Orienteering Championships (NOC) held in Flen, Sweden.

In 2004, he won a gold medal in the relay with the Finnish team at the 2004 European Orienteering Championships in Roskilde, Denmark. At the 2006 World Orienteering Championships in Aarhus, Ikonen placed eighth in the sprint, and seventeenth in the middle distance. He placed tenth overall in the 2006 World Cup. He won a bronze medal in the relay at the 2007 World Orienteering Championships in Kyiv, with the Finnish team, and won a silver medal in the relay at the 2007 Open Nordic Orienteering Championships held in Bornholm. At the 2008 European Orienteering Championships in Ventspils, Latvia, he won a bronze medal in the middle distance. He won a bronze medal in the relay with the Finnish team. He placed ninth overall in the 2008 Orienteering World Cup, coming third in two races. Competing at the 2009 World Games, Ikonen won a silver medal in the mixed relay with the Finnish team, along with Bodil Holmström, Tero Föhr and Minna Kauppi. He placed eleventh in the sprint distance at the 2009 World Games. In 2010 he placed third in the Jukola relay with Vaajakosken Terä.

Ikonen won a silver medal in the long distance at the 2011 World Orienteering Championships in France, behind winner Thierry Gueorgiou. He also run a leg on the Finnish relay team, which placed seventh. In the 2011 World Cup he obtained one race victory and one second place in the individual races, and placed sixth overall in the cup. He represented Finland at the 2012 World Orienteering Championships, where he placed seventeenth in the middle distance. In the 2012 Jukola relay he placed seventh with his club Vaajakosken Terä. He achieved one podium result in the 2014 Orienteering World Cup, placing second in a race in Kongsberg in June.

== Style of orienteering ==
Ikonen was known for competing without using a compass.

== Personal life and death ==
Ikonen was born in Vihanti on 30 June 1980. He was previously in a cohabiting relationship with fellow orienteer Minna Kauppi. He was diagnosed with a brain tumour around 2017, and died on 3 August 2024, at the age of 44.

== See also ==
- List of orienteers
- List of orienteering events
