= Kadan (disambiguation) =

Kadan was the son of the second Great Khan of the Mongols.

Kadan may also refer to:

- Kadaň, a town in the Czech Republic
- Eva Kadan, a fictional character
- Ursula Kadan (born 1988), Austrian orienteering competitor
