= Eva Juřeníková =

Czech orienteering competitor

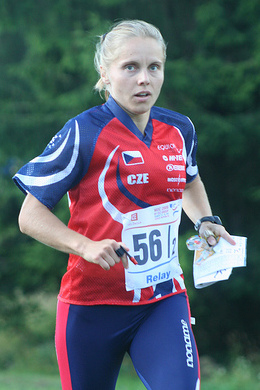
- Juřeníková at WOC 2008

Medal record

Women's orienteering

Representing Czech Republic

World Championships
Silver medal – second place	2011 Savoie	Relay

Junior World Championships
Gold medal – first place	1995 Horsens	Relay
Bronze medal – third place	1998 Reims	Classic

Eva Juřeníková (born 24 November 1978 in Ostrava) is a Czech orienteering competitor previously living in Borlänge, Sweden. After living 13 years in Sweden, she moved to Halden, Norway in the beginning of 2013 to work as a head coach in Halden SK.

She competed at the 2009 World Orienteering Championships in Miskolc, where she placed 5th in the relay with the Czech team. She is Junior World Champion in relay from 1995.
