= Ines Brodmann =

Swiss orienteering competitor

Medal record

Women's orienteering

Representing Switzerland

World Championships
Gold medal – first place	2012 Lausanne	Relay

Ines Brodmann (born 1 April 1985) is a Swiss orienteering competitor and world champion. She won a gold medal in the relay at the 2012 World Orienteering Championships in Lausanne, together with Judith Wyder and Simone Niggli-Luder.
