= Anders Holmberg =

Swedish orienteering competitor

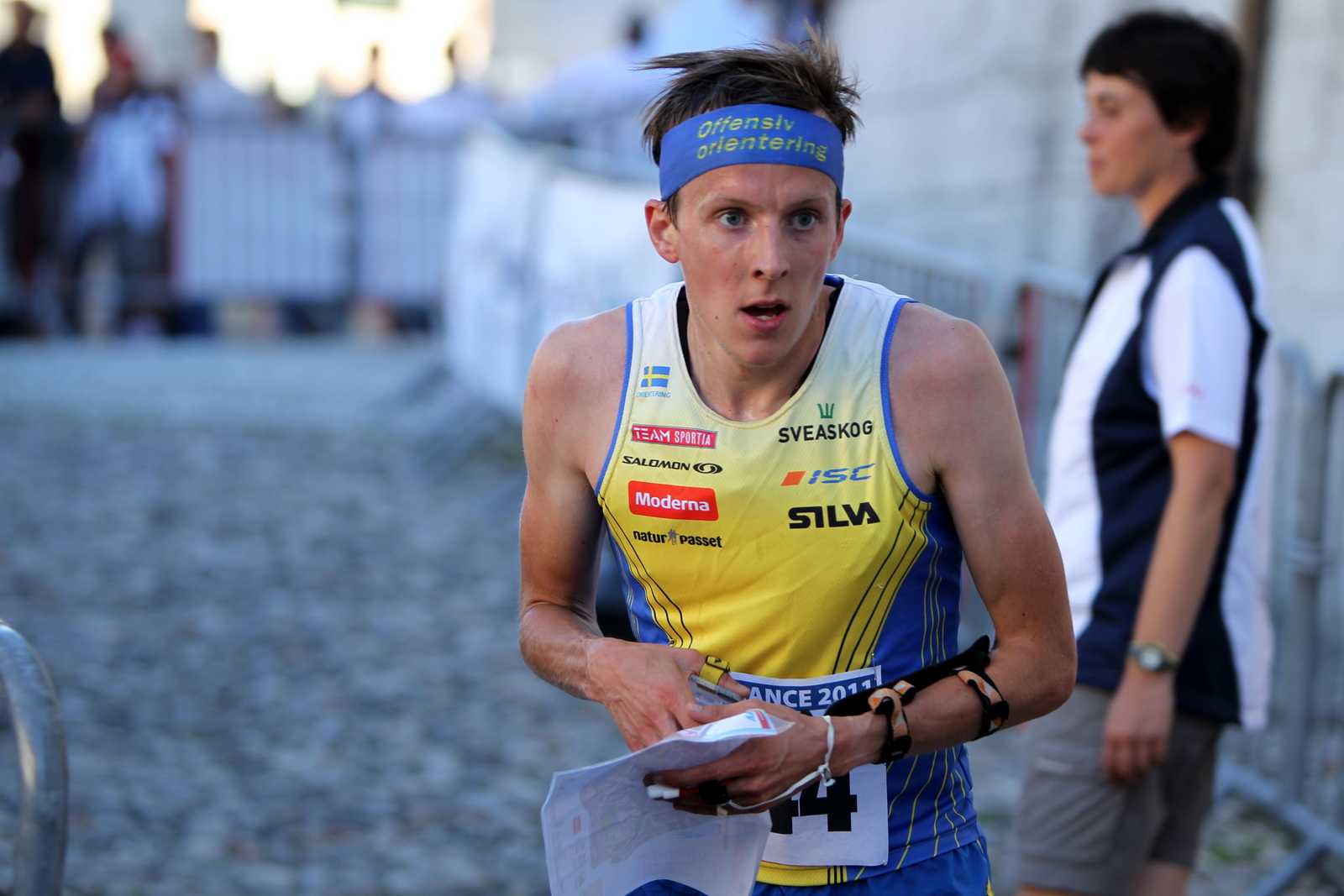
- Holmberg at WOC 2011 (sprint)

Medal record

Men's orienteering

Representing Sweden

World Championships
Silver medal – second place	2011 Savoie	Sprint
Bronze medal – third place	2011 Savoie	Relay
Bronze medal – third place	2012 Lausanne	Relay

European Championships
Silver medal – second place	2012 Falun	Relay

Junior World Championships
Bronze medal – third place	2002 Miskolc	Relay

Anders Holmberg (born 4 September 1984) is a Swedish orienteering competitor. He won a silver medal in the sprint at the 2011 World Orienteering Championships Chambéry.

At the 2002 Junior World Orienteering Championships he placed fifth in the long distance and third with the Swedish relay team.
