= Jan Procházka (orienteer) =

Czech orienteering competitor

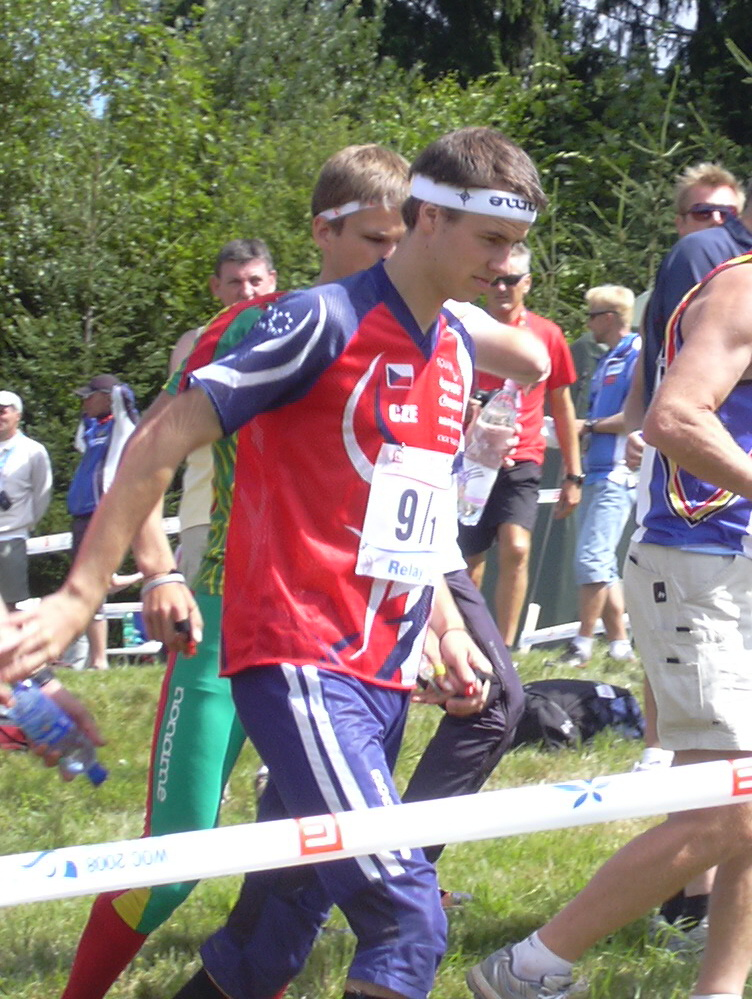
- Procházka at WOC 2008

Medal record

Men's orienteering

Representing Czech Republic

World Championships
| Gold medal – first place | 2012 Lausanne | Relay |

Jan Procházka (born 11 September 1984) is a Czech orienteering competitor and world champion. He won a gold medal in the relay at the 2012 World Orienteering Championships in Lausanne, together with Tomáš Dlabaja and Jan Šedivý. He runs for Finnish club Kalevan Rasti.

Prochazka has also won silver at the 2004 JWOC Relay and the European Orienteering Championships relay 10 years later.
