= Lizzie Ingham =

New Zealand orienteer

Personal information
- Born: 28 July 1988 (age 37)

Sport
- Sport: Orienteering
- Club: Halden SK; Wellington Orienteering Club
Medal record
Representing New Zealand
Women's orienteering
Oceania Orienteering Championships
Gold medal – first place	2009 South Island	Sprint
Gold medal – first place	2009 South Island	Middle
Gold medal – first place	2009 South Island	Long
Gold medal – first place	2009 South Island	Relay
Gold medal – first place	2011 Victoria & New South Wales	Middle
Silver medal – second place	2011 Victoria & New South Wales	Sprint
Bronze medal – third place	2013 New Zealand	Long

Lizzie Ingham (born 28 July 1988) is a New Zealand orienteer.

At the 2009 Oceania Orienteering Championships she won four gold medals, in sprint, middle, long and relay.

She placed 11th in the sprint, 18th in the middle and 13th in the long distance at the 2011 World Orienteering Championships.

At the 2012 World Orienteering Championships in Lausanne, she placed 9th in the sprint contest.

She placed 14th in sprint final at the 2013 World Orienteering Championships in Vuokatti. She also competed at the 2014, 2015, 2016 and 2017 World Orienteering Championships.
