= Robert Merl =

Austrian orienteering competitor

Medal record

Men's orienteering

Representing Austria

World Games
Bronze medal – third place	2013 Cali	Relay

Junior World Championships
Gold medal – first place	2011 Wejherowo	Middle
Silver medal – second place	2011 Wejherowo	Long

Robert Merl (born 5 June 1991) is an Austrian orienteering competitor and junior world champion.

He won a gold medal in the middle distance at the 2011 Junior World Orienteering Championships.

He competed at the 2012 World Orienteering Championships. In the sprint competition he qualified for the final, where he placed 21st.

At the World Games in 2013 he won a bronze medal in the mixed relay, together with Gernot Kerschbaumer, Ursula Kadan and Anna Nilsson Simkovics.
