= Anna Nilsson Simkovics =

Austrian orienteering competitor

Medal record

Women's orienteering

Representing Austria

World Games
| Bronze medal – third place | 2013 Cali | Relay |

Anna Nilsson Simkovics (born 29 November 1993) is an Austrian orienteering competitor. At the World Games in 2013, she won a bronze medal in the mixed relay, together with Gernot Kerschbaumer, Robert Merl, and Ursula Kadan.
