= Vilius Aleliūnas =

Lithuanian orienteering competitor (born 1987)

Medal record

Men's orienteering

Representing Lithuania

World Games
| Bronze medal – third place | 2013 Cali | Middle |

Vilius Aleliūnas (born October 19, 1987 in Panevėžys) is a Lithuanian orienteering competitor. At the World Games in 2013 he won a bronze medal in the middle distance, behind Matthias Kyburz and Daniel Hubmann, and ahead of Rasmus Thrane Hansen.
