= Helena Bergman =

Swedish orienteer

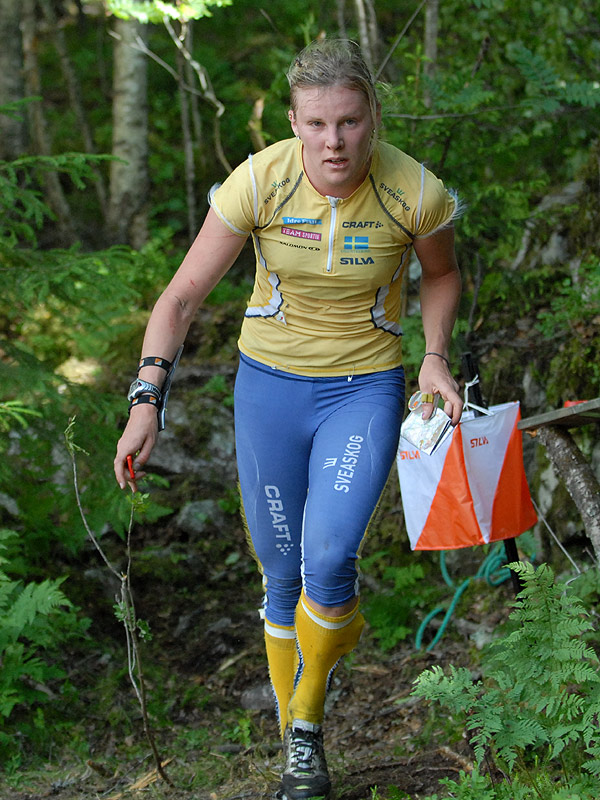
- Bergman in 2008

Medal record

Women's orienteering

Representing Sweden

The World Games
Gold medal – first place	2017 Wroclaw	Middle

World Championships
Gold medal – first place	2009 Miskolc	Sprint
Gold medal – first place	2011 Savoie	Middle
Gold medal – first place	2017 Tartu	Relay
Gold medal – first place	2017 Tartu	Mixed sprint relay
Silver medal – second place	2007 Kyiv	Relay
Silver medal – second place	2009 Miskolc	Relay
Silver medal – second place	2010 Trondheim	Sprint
Silver medal – second place	2011 Savoie	Sprint
Silver medal – second place	2012 Lausanne	Relay
Silver medal – second place	2018 Riga	Relay
Bronze medal – third place	2008 Olomouc	Sprint
Bronze medal – third place	2008 Olomouc	Relay
Bronze medal – third place	2010 Trondheim	Relay
Bronze medal – third place	2011 Savoie	Long
Bronze medal – third place	2011 Savoie	Relay
Bronze medal – third place	2014 Venice	Relay
Bronze medal – third place	2015 Inverness	Relay
Bronze medal – third place	2016 Strömstad	Mixed sprint relay

World Cup
Gold medal – first place	2011	WC Overall
Silver medal – second place	2010	WC Overall
Bronze medal – third place	2008	WC Overall
Bronze medal – third place	2009	WC Overall

European Championships
Gold medal – first place	2008 Ventspils	Relay
Gold medal – first place	2010 Primorsko	Sprint
Gold medal – first place	2010 Primorsko	Relay
Bronze medal – third place	2008 Ventspils	Sprint
Bronze medal – third place	2010 Primorsko	Long

Junior World Championships
Gold medal – first place	2004 Gdańsk	Middle
Gold medal – first place	2004 Gdańsk	Relay
Silver medal – second place	2003 Põlva	Relay
Silver medal – second place	2005 Tenero	Relay
Bronze medal – third place	2002 Alicante	Relay
Bronze medal – third place	2003 Põlva	Long

Helena Bergman (née Jansson, born 28 August 1985) is a Swedish orienteer who became World Champion in the sprint distance in Miskolc, Hungary in 2009. She lives in Stockholm and competes for OK Ravinen. She is married to Gustav Bergman.

== Results ==
=== World Games ===
- 2017 Gold, Middle distance

=== World Orienteering Championships ===
- 2011 Silver, Sprint
- 2011 Bronze, Long distance
- 2011 Gold, Middle distance
- 2011 Bronze, Relay
- 2010 Silver, Sprint
- 2010 Bronze, Relay
- 2009 Gold, Sprint
- 2009 Silver, Relay
- 2008 Bronze, Sprint
- 2008 Bronze, Relay
- 2007 Silver, Relay
- 2007 4th, Sprint
- 2007 5th, Middle distance
- 2006 9th, Middle distance

=== European Championships ===
- 2010 Gold, Sprint
- 2010 Gold, Relay
- 2010 Bronze, Long distance
- 2008 Gold, Relay
- 2008 Bronze, Sprint

=== Nordic Championships ===
- 2009 Gold, Middle distance
- 2009 Gold, Relay
- 2007 Gold, Sprint
- 2007 Gold, Relay

=== Swedish Championships ===
- 2007 Gold, Sprint

=== Junior World Championships ===
- 2005 Silver 2005 Relay
- 2004 Gold, Middle distance
- 2004 Gold, Relay
- 2003 Silver, Relay
- 2003 Bronze, Long distance
- 2002 Bronze, Relay

=== O-Ringen ===
- 2009 1st
- 2004 1st
- 2003 1st
