= Dmitry Tsvetkov =

Russian orienteering competitor

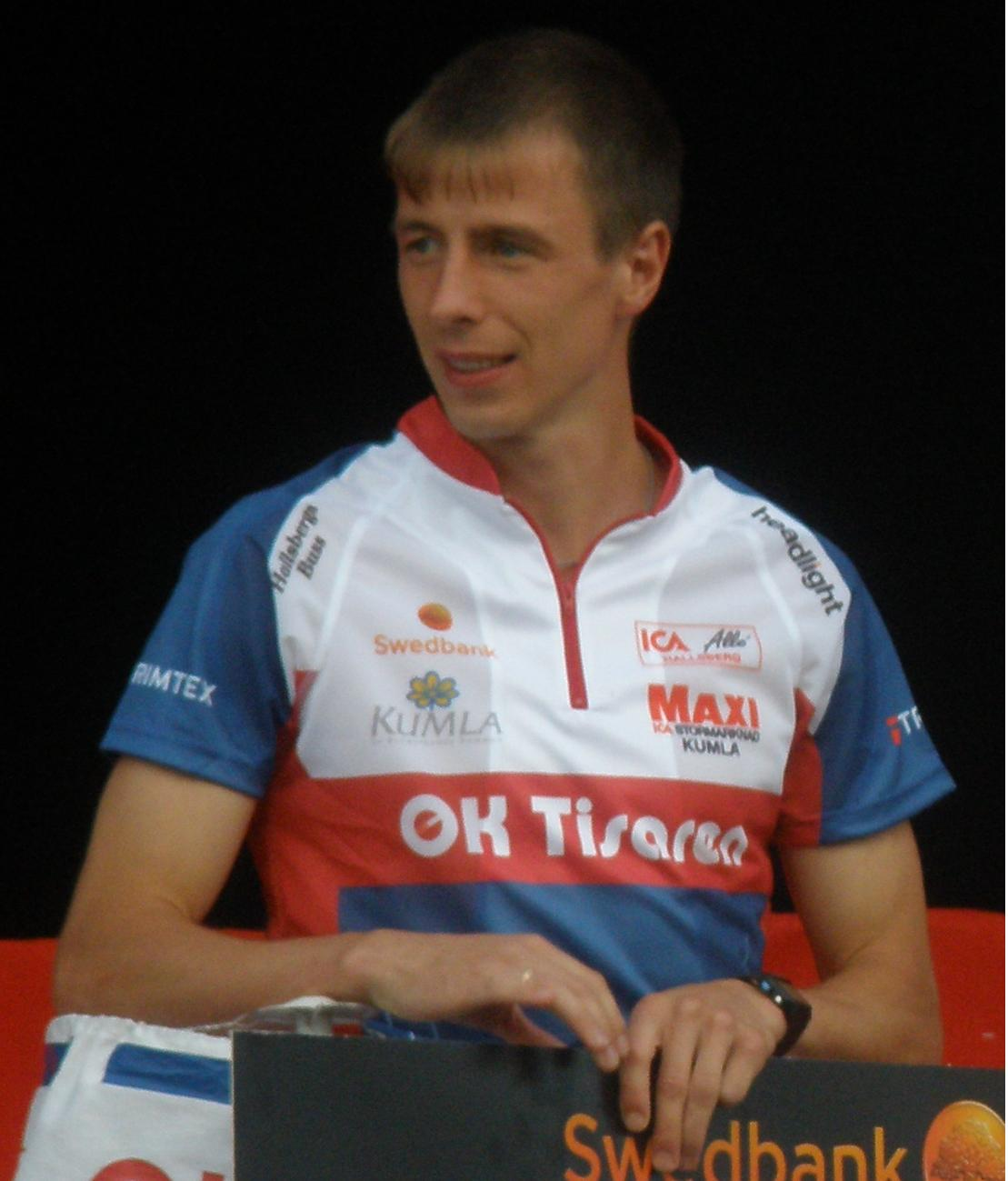
- Tsvetkov at O-Ringen 2008

Medal record

Men's orienteering

Representing Russia

World Championships
Gold medal – first place	2010 Trondheim	Relay
Gold medal – first place	2013 Vuokatti	Relay
Silver medal – second place	2008 Olomouc	Relay
Silver medal – second place	2009 Miskolc	Relay

World Games
Gold medal – first place	2009 Kaohsiung	Mixed relay
Silver medal – second place	2009 Kaohsiung	Middle
Bronze medal – third place	2017 Wroclaw	Mixed relay

European Championships
Gold medal – first place	2008 Ventspils	Long
Gold medal – first place	2008 Ventspils	Relay

Military World Games
Gold medal – first place	2015 Mungyeong	Middle
Gold medal – first place	2015 Mungyeong	Team
Gold medal – first place	2019 Wuhan	Long
Silver medal – second place	2015 Mungyeong	Relay
Silver medal – second place	2019 Wuhan	Relay
Silver medal – second place	2019 Wuhan	Team

Junior World Championships
Gold medal – first place	2003 Põlva	Classic
Gold medal – first place	2003 Põlva	Relay

Dmitriy Alexandrovich Tsvetkov (Russian: Дмитрий Александрович Цветков; born September 10, 1983) is a Russian orienteering competitor and past European champion. He received a gold medal in the long distance at the 2008 European Orienteering Championships in Ventspils, and also a gold medal in the relay event, together with Andrey Khramov and Valentin Novikov. Dmitry also won two gold medals at JWOC 2003 in Estonia in a classic distance and relay. On March 5, 2022, Dmitry Tsvetkov supported the Russian invasion of Ukraine.
