= Matthias Müller (orienteer) =

Swiss orienteering competitor

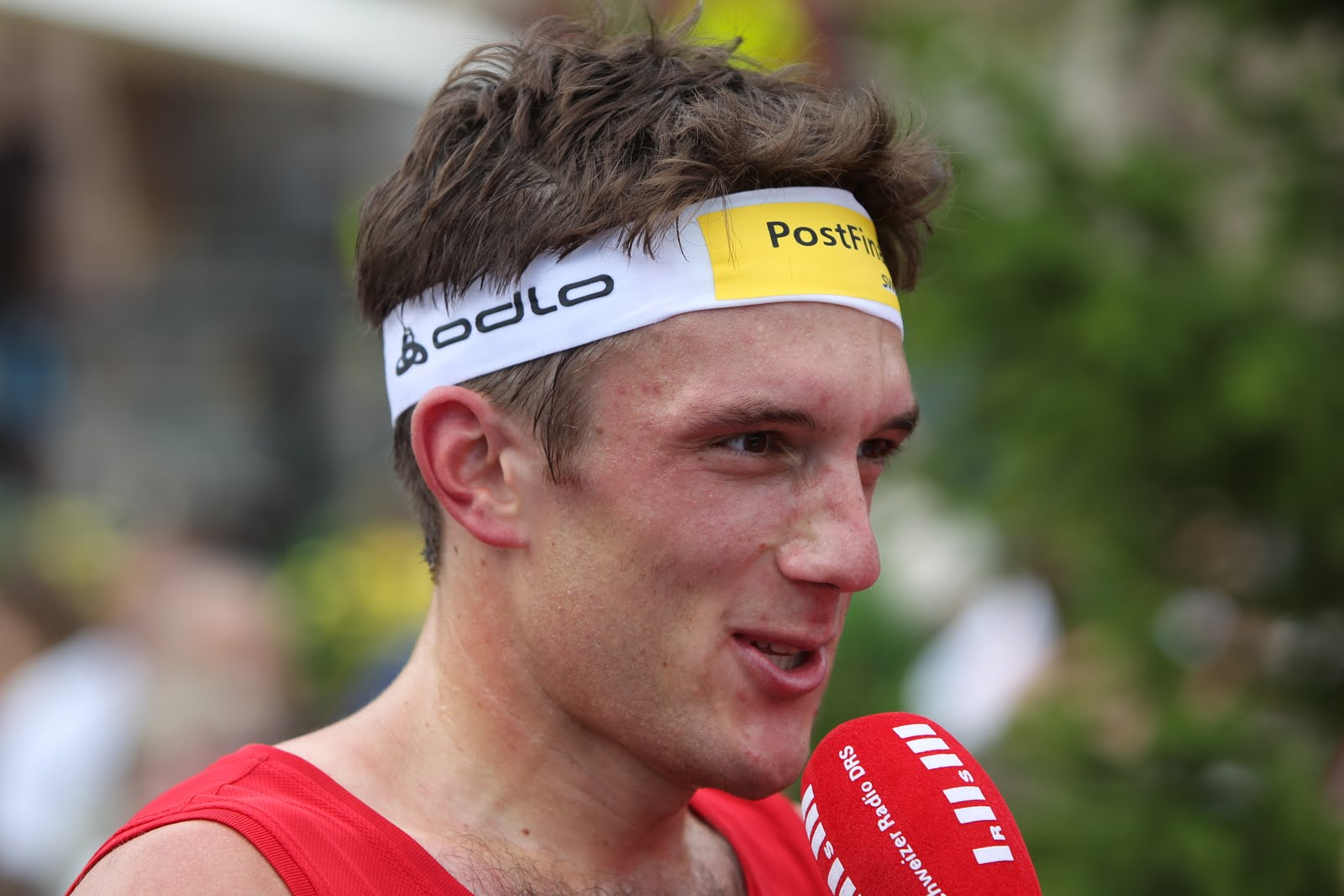
- Müller at WOC 2010

Medal record

Men's orienteering

Representing Switzerland

World Championships
Gold medal – first place	2010 Trondheim	Sprint
Bronze medal – third place	2010 Trondheim	Relay
Bronze medal – third place	2011 Savoie	Sprint
Bronze medal – third place	2012 Lausanne	Sprint

World Cup
Silver medal – second place	2010	WC Overall

European Championships
Gold medal – first place	2010 Primorsko	Relay
Gold medal – first place	2012 Falun	Relay

Matthias Müller (born 12 September 1982) is a Swiss orienteering competitor.

He participated in the 2009 World Orienteering Championships in Miskolc, where he placed 7th in the Sprint and 4th in the Middle Distance events.

He won a gold medal in the Relay with the Swiss team at the 2010 European Orienteering Championships in Primorsko. He won the Sprint Distance at the 2010 World Orienteering Championships in Trondheim, and the Bronze medal in the Relay competition together with Daniel Hubmann and Matthias Merz.
