= Kiril Nikolov =

Bulgarian orienteer

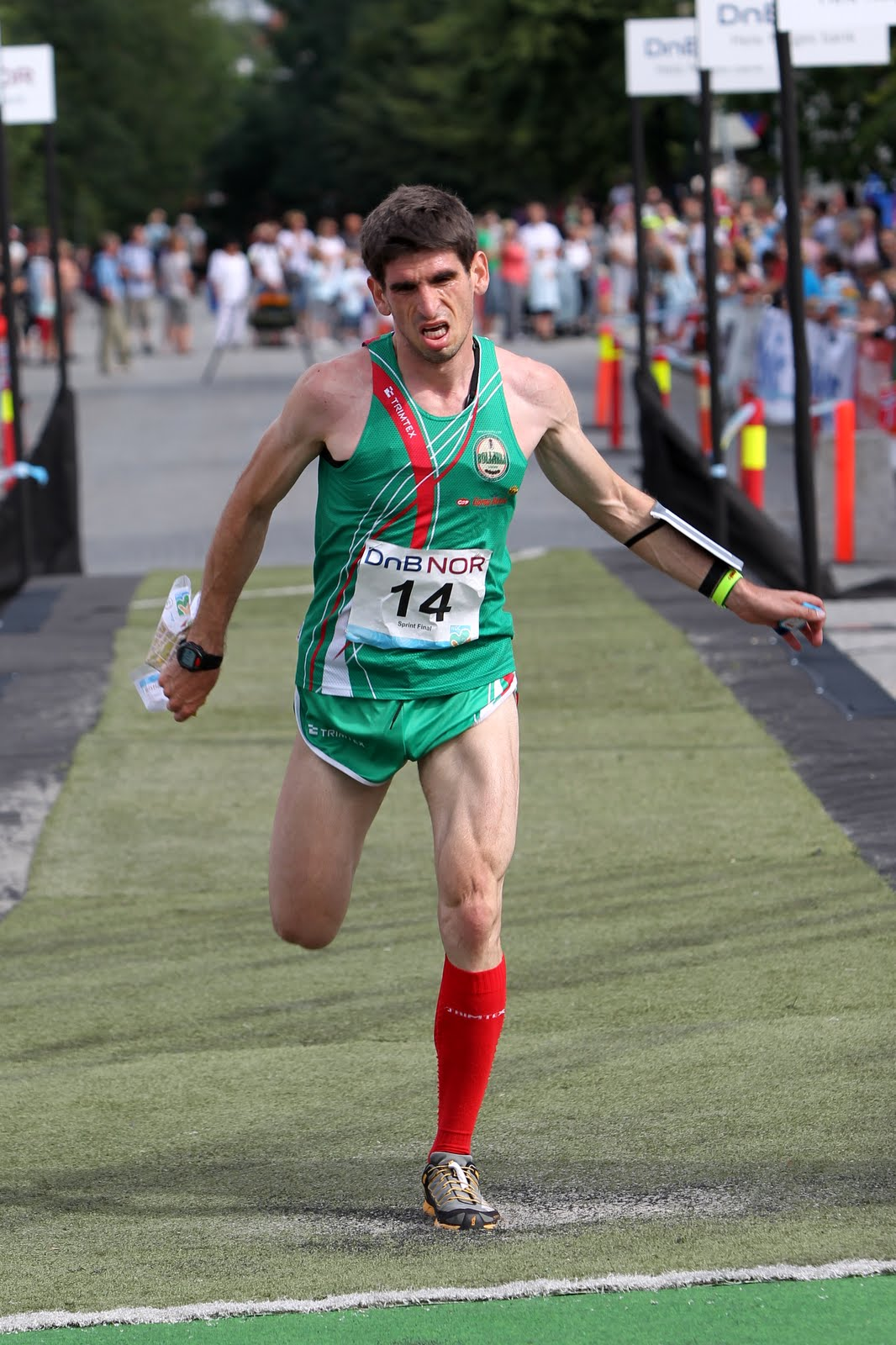
- Nikolov at WOC 2010

Medal record

Men's orienteering

Representing Bulgaria

European Championships
Silver medal – second place	2012 Falun	Sprint

Kiril Nikolov (Bulgarian: Кирил Николов, born 1982), also known as the Disl, is a Bulgarian orienteer.

He was born in Ruse. When he was young he tried all kinds of sport, but in 1998 he finally found his love: orienteering. The next year he was in the national team, and one more year later he tried Junior World Orienteering Championships.

At his first World Orienteering Championships in Switzerland (at the age of 21) he made very good results - 12th on the sprint / 15th on the long distance. During the World Championships in 2004 he showed the orienteering fans his class in the relay events, coming 5th on the first leg, just seconds after the first teams. The world started talking about him after his incredible run on the first leg of Tiomila 2005 - it was two seconds from the leading team, and the 3rd place was success for the whole Bulgaria. At the moment he is training in Bulgaria and Sweden.

He placed 6th in the sprint at the 2009 World Orienteering Championships in Miskolc, and also participated on the Bulgarian relay team (which placed 18th).

In August 2015 he successfully finished the tourist route Kom–Emine for 4 days and 13 hours and 5 minutes, thus setting a record for the route.
