= Annika Billstam =

Swedish orienteering competitor

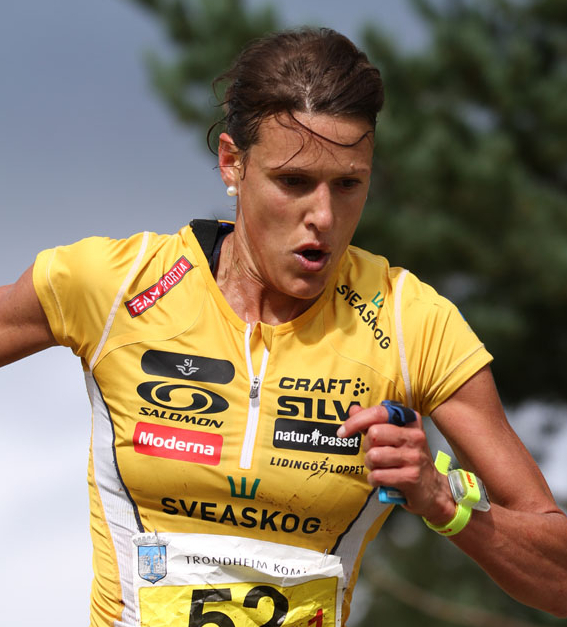
- Billstam at WOC 2010

Medal record

Women's orienteering

Representing Sweden

World Championships
Gold medal – first place	2011 Savoie	Long
Gold medal – first place	2014 Trentino	Middle
Gold medal – first place	2015 Inverness	Middle
Silver medal – second place	2007 Kyiv	Relay
Silver medal – second place	2012 Lausanne	Relay
Silver medal – second place	2013 Vuokatti	Sprint
Bronze medal – third place	2008 Olomouc	Long
Bronze medal – third place	2008 Olomouc	Relay
Bronze medal – third place	2010 Trondheim	Relay
Bronze medal – third place	2011 Savoie	Relay
Bronze medal – third place	2012 Lausanne	Sprint
Bronze medal – third place	2012 Lausanne	Long
Bronze medal – third place	2014 Trentino	Relay
Bronze medal – third place	2015 Inverness	Relay

World Games
Gold medal – first place	2013 Cali	Sprint

European Championships
Bronze medal – third place	2012 Falun	Relay

Annika Billstam (born 8 March 1976) is a Swedish orienteering competitor living in Uppsala. Formerly competing for OK Linné in Uppsala, Annika moved to Stockholm and switched to IFK Lidingö in the winter of 2007 before switching back to OK Linné in January 2012. She earned a silver medal in the relay at the 2007 World Orienteering Championships in Kyiv. She followed that with bronze medals in the long distance and the relay at the 2008 World Orienteering Championships in the Czech Republic.

In 2012, Billstam won the Swedish mountain marathon Vértex Fjällmaraton.
