= 2008 World Orienteering Championships =

Competition in Olomouc, Czech Republic

- Host city: Olomouc
- Country: Czech Republic
- Events: 8

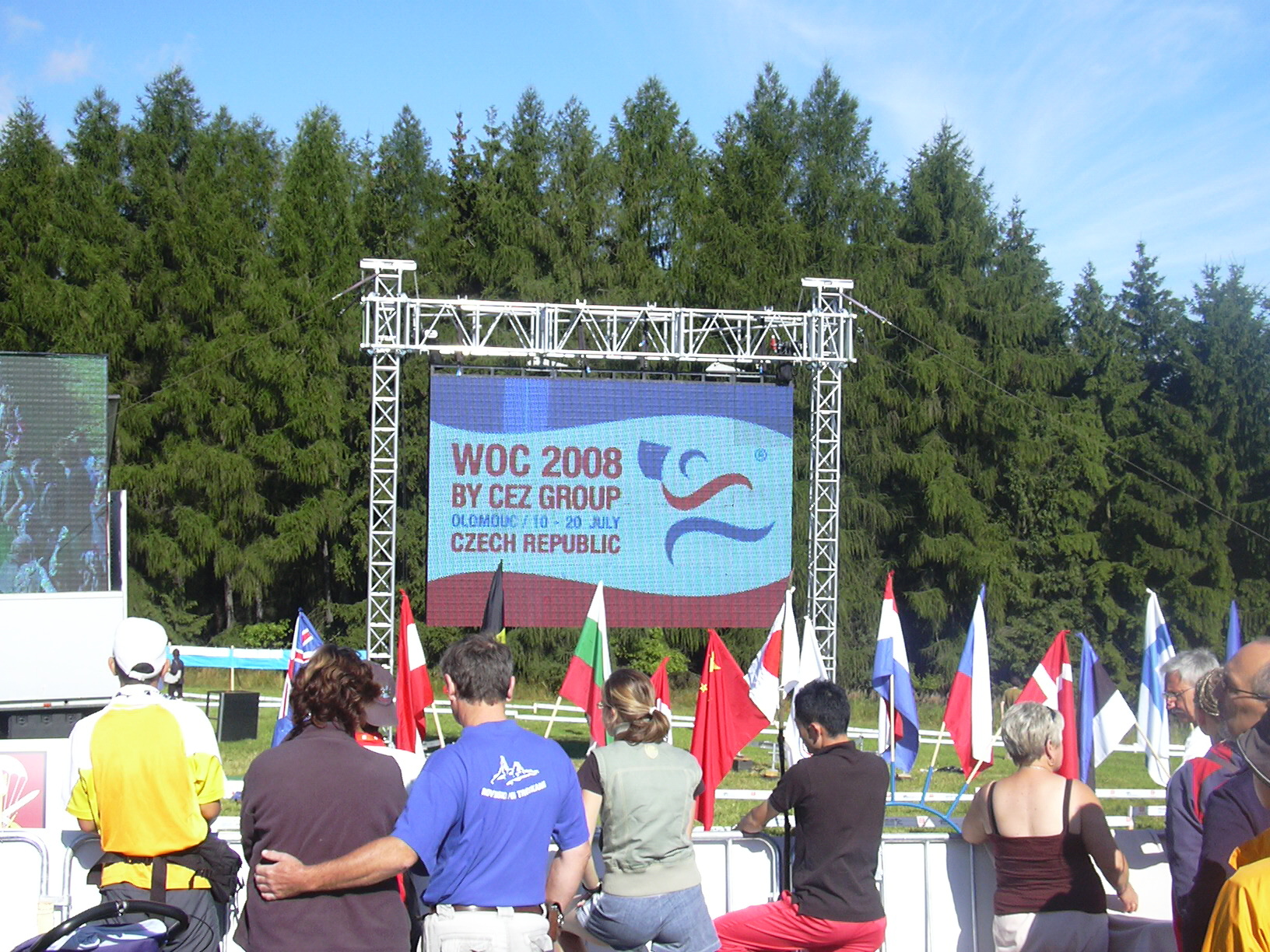
World Orienteering Championships 2008

The 2008 World Orienteering Championships, the 25th World Orienteering Championships, were held in Olomouc in the Czech Republic, 10–20 July 2008.

The championships had eight events; sprint for men and women, middle distance for men and women, long distance (formerly called individual or classic distance) for men and women, and relays for men and women.

== Medalists ==
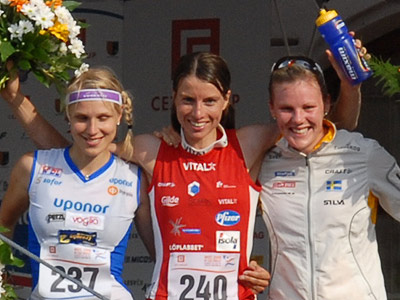
Medalists at the WOC 2008 women's sprint: Kauppi (silver), Hausken (gold), Jansson (bronze).

Event	Gold		Silver	Bronze
Men's sprint	Andrey Khramov (RUS)	13:36.9	Daniel Hubmann (SUI)	Martin Johansson (SWE)
Women's sprint	Anne Margrethe Hausken (NOR)	12:42.2	Minna Kauppi (FIN)	Helena Jansson (SWE)
Men's middle distance	Thierry Gueorgiou (FRA)	33:49	Michal Smola (CZE)	Valentin Novikov (RUS)
Women's middle distance	Minna Kauppi (FIN)	32:35	Vroni König-Salmi (SUI)	Radka Brožková (CZE)
Men's long distance	Daniel Hubmann (SUI)	1:46:08	Anders Nordberg (NOR)	François Gonon (FRA)
Women's long distance	Dana Brožková (CZE)	1:24:26	Marianne Andersen (NOR)	Annika Billstam (SWE)
Men's relay	Great Britain (GBR): Graham Gristwood; Jon Duncan; Jamie Stevenson	2:18:17	Russia (RUS): Dmitriy Tsvetkov; Andrey Khramov; Valentin Novikov	Switzerland (SUI): Baptiste Rollier; Matthias Merz; Daniel Hubmann
Women's relay	Finland (FIN): Katri Lindeqvist; Merja Rantanen; Minna Kauppi	2:13:14	Russia (RUS): Galina Vinogradova; Yulia Novikova; Tatiana Ryabkina	Sweden (SWE): Annika Billstam; Sofie Johansson; Helena Jansson
