= Gernot Ymsén-Kerschbaumer =

Austrian orienteering competitor

Medal record

Men's orienteering

Representing Austria

European Championships
Bronze medal – third place	2018 Ticino	Long

World Games
Bronze medal – third place	2013 Cali	Relay

Gernot Ymsén-Kerschbaumer, previously Gernot Kerschbaumer, is an Austrian orienteering competitor born in 1983 in Vorau. At the World Games in 2013 he won a bronze medal in the mixed relay, together with Anna Nilsson Simkovics, Robert Merl and Ursula Kadan.

Kerschbaumer's most recent success was in the 2018 European Orienteering Championships, where he received the bronze medal in the Long Distance event in Switzerland.

He lives in Kristianstad and competes for Pan-Kristianstad.
