= Tero Föhr =

Finnish orienteering competitor

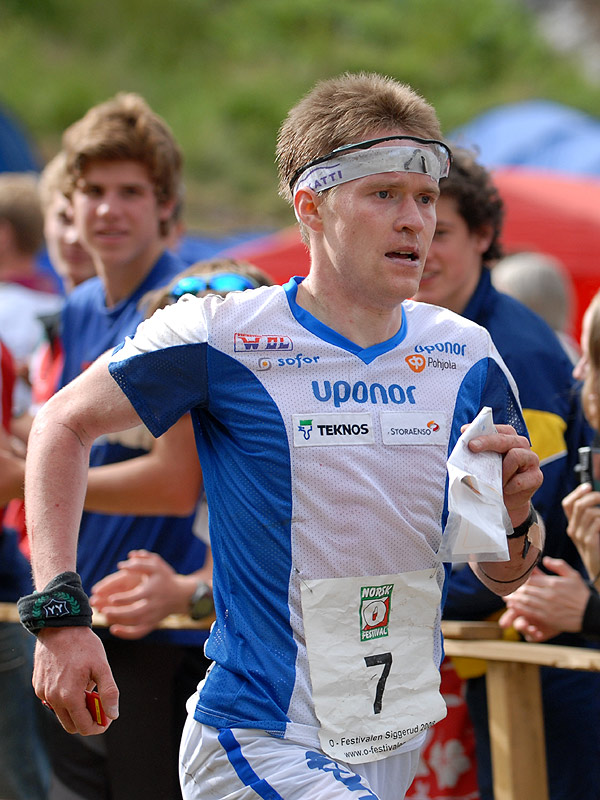
- Föhr in 2008

Medal record

Men's orienteering

Representing Finland

World Championships
Silver medal – second place	2007 Kyiv	Middle distance
Bronze medal – third place	2007 Kyiv	Relay
Bronze medal – third place	2009 Miskolc	Relay

World Games
Silver medal – second place	2009 Kaohsiung	Mixed relay
Bronze medal – third place	2009 Kaohsiung	Sprint

Tero Föhr (born 1 August 1980) is a Finnish orienteering competitor. He received a silver medal in the middle distance at the 2007 World Orienteering Championships in Kyiv. He also participated on the Finnish team that achieved a bronze medal in the championship relay 2007 and 2009.

Föhr won his first international victory when he won the long distance World Cup race at Siggerud, Norway, in 2008 – 2 seconds ahead of Swedish Emil Wingstedt. He won the Jukola relay in 2006.

== See also ==
- Finnish orienteers
- List of orienteers
- List of orienteering events
