= Valentin Novikov =

Russian orienteering competitor (born 1974)

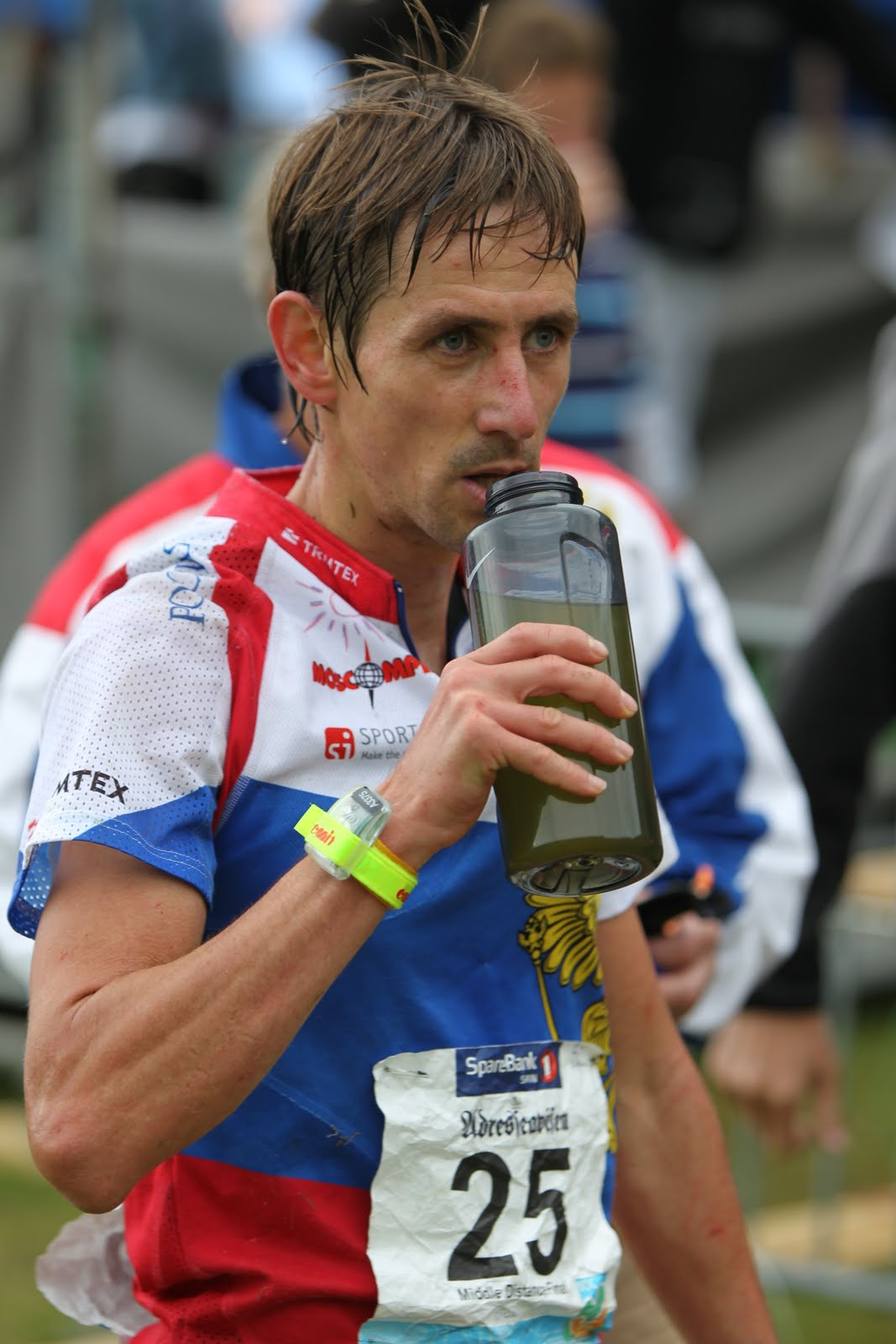
- V.Novikov at WOC 2010

Medal record

Men's orienteering

Representing Russia

World Championships
| Gold medal – first place | 2006 Aarhus | Relay |
| Gold medal – first place | 2007 Kyiv | Relay |
| Gold medal – first place | 2010 Trondheim | Relay |
| Gold medal – first place | 2013 Vuokatti | Relay |
| Silver medal – second place | 2004 Västerås | Relay |
| Silver medal – second place | 2004 Västerås | Middle |
| Silver medal – second place | 2008 Olomouc | Relay |
| Silver medal – second place | 2009 Miskolc | Relay |
| Silver medal – second place | 2012 Lausanne | Middle |
| Bronze medal – third place | 2007 Kyiv | Middle |
| Bronze medal – third place | 2008 Olomouc | Middle |

World Cup
| Bronze medal – third place | 2006 | WC Overall |

European Championships
| Gold medal – first place | 2000 Truskavets | Short |
| Gold medal – first place | 2000 Truskavets | Long |
| Gold medal – first place | 2008 Ventspils | Relay |
| Gold medal – first place | 2010 Primorsko | Middle |
| Silver medal – second place | 2012 Falun | Middle |
| Bronze medal – third place | 2006 Otepää | Middle |
| Bronze medal – third place | 2012 Falun | Long |

Military World Games
| Silver medal – second place | 2019 Wuhan | Relay |

Nordic Championships
| Bronze medal – third place | 2001 Mikkeli | Relay |

Junior World Championships
| Gold medal – first place | 1994 Gdynia | Relay |

Valentin Yuryevich Novikov (Russian: Валентин Юрьевич Новиков; born 1 October 1974) is a Russian orienteering competitor. He is the brother of Leonid Novikov.

== World championships ==
He finished second in the 2004 World Orienteering Championships, Middle distance, and third in 2007. He is a two time Relay World Champion, from 2006 and 2007, as a member of the Russian winning teams, and earned a silver medal in 2004.

== European championships ==
Novikov received two individual gold medals at the 2000 European Championships in Truskavets, and a bronze medal at the 2006 European Championships in Otepää. He received also a gold medal in the relay at the 2008 European Orienteering Championships in Ventspils, together with Andrey Khramov and Dmitriy Tsvetkov.

== Other international results ==
In 2004 Valentin became the first non-Scandinavian man who won O-Ringen.

Novikov was part of the winning team in Jukola in 2008. He made a decisive last leg.
