= Jan Šedivý =

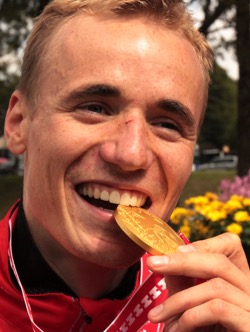

Personal information
- Nationality: Czech
- Born: 1984 (age 41–42) Prague

Sport
- Sport: Orienteering
Medal record
Men's orienteering
Representing Czech Republic
World Championships
Gold medal – first place	2012 Lausanne	Relay
European Championships
Bronze medal – third place	2016 Jeseník	Relay
Junior World Championships
Silver medal – second place	2004 Gdańsk	Relay

Jan Šedivý (born 1984) is a Czech orienteering competitor and world champion, born in Prague. He won a gold medal in the relay at the 2012 World Orienteering Championships in Lausanne, together with Tomáš Dlabaja and Jan Procházka.
