= Rasmus Thrane Hansen =

Danish orienteering competitor

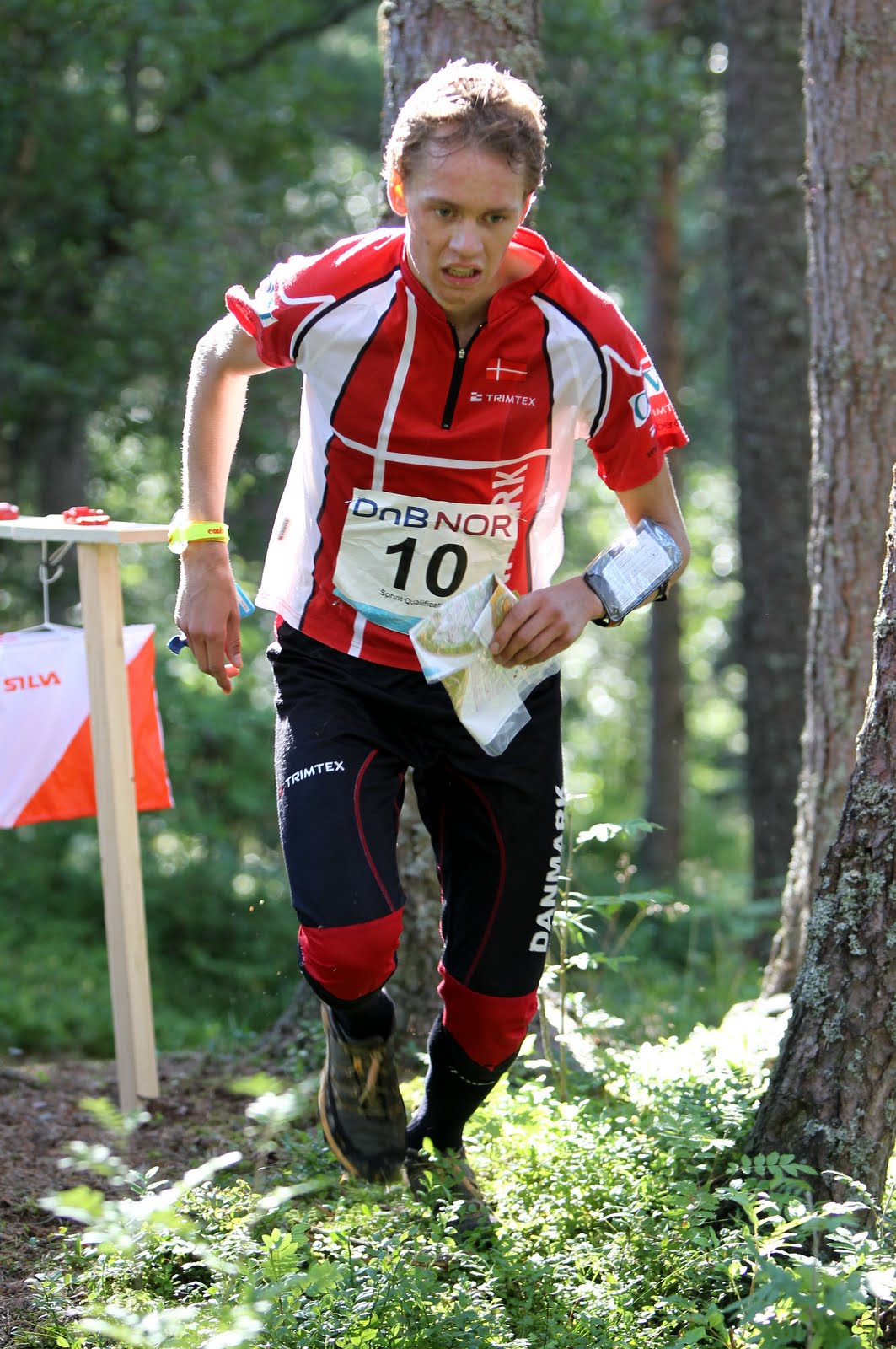

Medal record

Men's orienteering

Representing Denmark

World Games
| Silver medal – second place | 2013 Cali | Relay |

Rasmus Thrane Hansen is a Danish orienteering competitor. His achievements include being medalists at the World Games.

== Biography ==
At the World Games in 2013 Hansen placed fourth in the middle distance, and won a silver medal in the mixed relay with the Danish team.
