= Ursula Kadan =

Austrian orienteer (born 1988)

Personal information
- Born: 7 April 1988 (age 38)

Sport
- Sport: Orienteering
- Club: OC Fuerstenfeld; OK Pan Kristianstad
Medal record
Women's orienteering
Representing Austria
World Games
Bronze medal – third place	2013 Cali	Relay

Ursula Kadan (born 7 April 1988) is an Austrian orienteering competitor. At the World Games in 2013 she won a bronze medal in the mixed relay, together with Gernot Kerschbaumer, Robert Merl and Anna Nilsson Simkovics.
