= Matthias Merz =

Swiss orienteering competitor

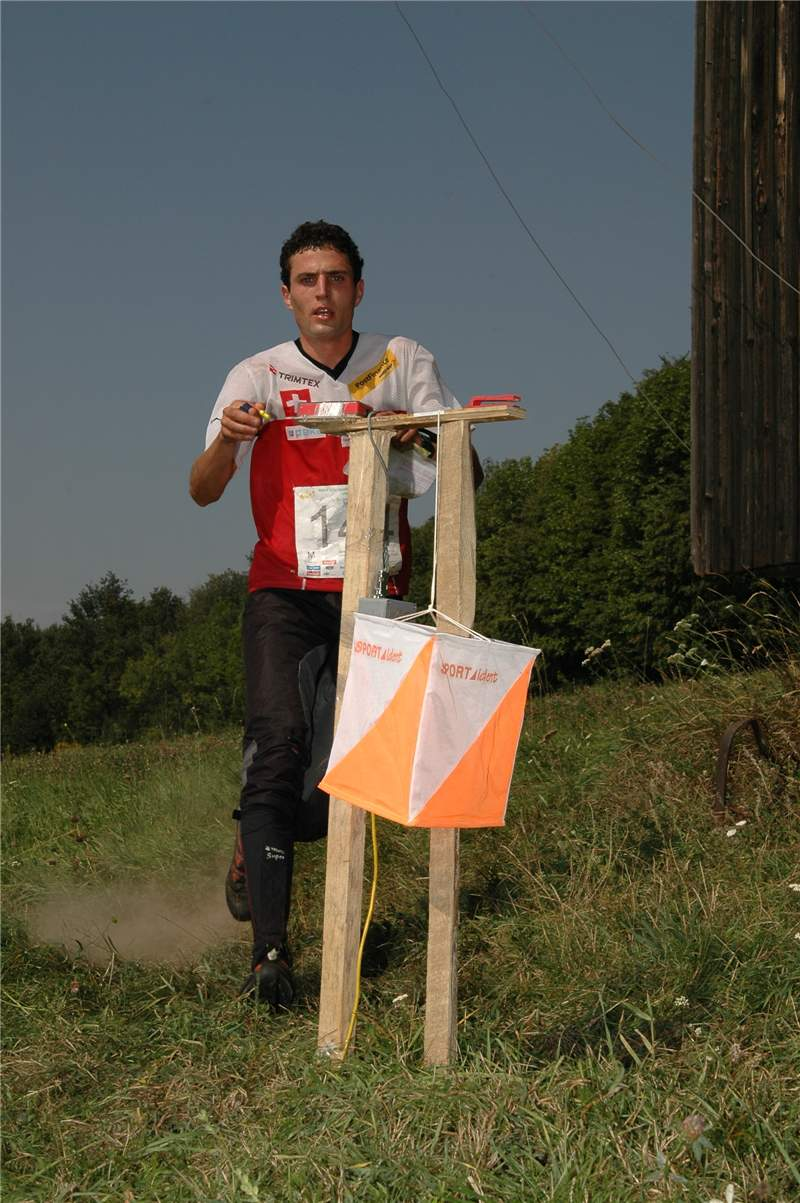
- Merz at WOC 2007 in Kyiv, Ukraine

Personal information
- Nationality: Swiss
- Born: 1 February 1984 (age 42)

Sport
- Sport: Orienteering
Medal record
Men's orienteering
Representing Switzerland
World Championships
Gold medal – first place	2007 Kyiv	Long
Gold medal – first place	2009 Miskolc	Relay
Silver medal – second place	2007 Kyiv	Sprint
Silver medal – second place	2012 Lausanne	Sprint
Silver medal – second place	2012 Lausanne	Long
Bronze medal – third place	2005 Aichi	Relay
Bronze medal – third place	2008 Olomouc	Relay
Bronze medal – third place	2009 Miskolc	Middle
Bronze medal – third place	2010 Trondheim	Relay
World Cup
Bronze medal – third place	2008	WC Overall
Bronze medal – third place	2011	WC Overall
European Championships
Gold medal – first place	2010 Primorsko	Relay
Silver medal – second place	2008 Ventspils	Relay
Silver medal – second place	2010 Primorsko	Middle
Silver medal – second place	2012 Falun	Long
Nordic Championships
Gold medal – first place	2007 Bornholm	Long
Gold medal – first place	2007 Bornholm	Sprint
Gold medal – first place	2007 Bornholm	Relay
Junior World Championships
Gold medal – first place	2002 Alicante	Relay
Gold medal – first place	2003 Põlva	Short
Gold medal – first place	2004 Gdańsk	Long
Silver medal – second place	2003 Põlva	Classic
Silver medal – second place	2004 Gdańsk	Middle
Bronze medal – third place	2003 Põlva	Relay
Bronze medal – third place	2004 Gdańsk	Relay

Matthias Merz (born 1 February 1984) is a Swiss orienteering competitor, winner of the 2007 World Orienteering Championships in Kyiv, Ukraine, Long distance, and also earned a silver medal on the Sprint distance in the same championship. He has a bronze medal from the 2005 Relay Championships in Aichi, Japan, as member of the Swiss winning team. When Merz won the bronze medal in the middle distance at the World Championships in Miskolc in 2009, he joined countryman Daniel Hubmann as the only two men to have ever medaled in all four orienteering disciplines at the World Championships.

He on 30 December 2007, he was ranked no. 2 on the IOF (International Orienteering Federation) World Ranking.
