= Simonas Krėpšta =

Lithuanian orienteering competitor (born 1984)

Simonas Krėpšta (born 17 January 1984) is a Lithuanian financial-sector expert with experience in financial supervision, regulation, macroprudential policy and economic policy at both national and European level.

== Career ==
- Director of the Financial Stability Department, Bank of Lithuania — early in his career, he headed the department responsible for macroprudential policy and financial stability analysis.
- Chief Economic Adviser to the President of Lithuania (2019–2021) — led economic and social policy initiatives for the Office of the President.
- Board Member, Bank of Lithuania — served on the board of the Bank of Lithuania, where he oversaw financial market supervision and digital development.
- Executive Board Member, AMLA (Authority for Anti-Money Laundering and Countering the Financing of Terrorism) — appointed in June 2025, taking office as one of the founding members of the Executive Board of the newly established EU anti-money-laundering authority, based in Frankfurt.
- Other roles have included representing Lithuania on the ECB Supervisory Board and the EBA Board of Supervisors, chairing the Capital Market Council, and a secondment to the Bank of England.

== Sporting career ==
Simonas Krėpšta
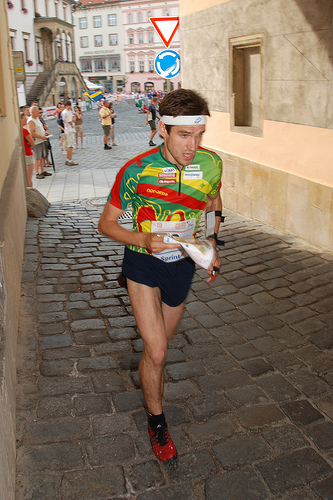
- Simonas Krėpšta at WOC 2008

Medal record

Men's orienteering

Representing Lithuania

Junior World Championships
Bronze medal – third place	2004 Gdańsk	Long
Bronze medal – third place	2004 Gdańsk	Middle

Before his career in central banking and financial regulation, Krėpšta was a competitive orienteering athlete representing Lithuania: He received bronze medals both in the long course and the short course at the 2004 Junior World Orienteering Championships in Gdańsk. He won the multiday race O-Ringen in 2006.
