= Edgars Bertuks =

Latvian orienteering competitor (born 1985)

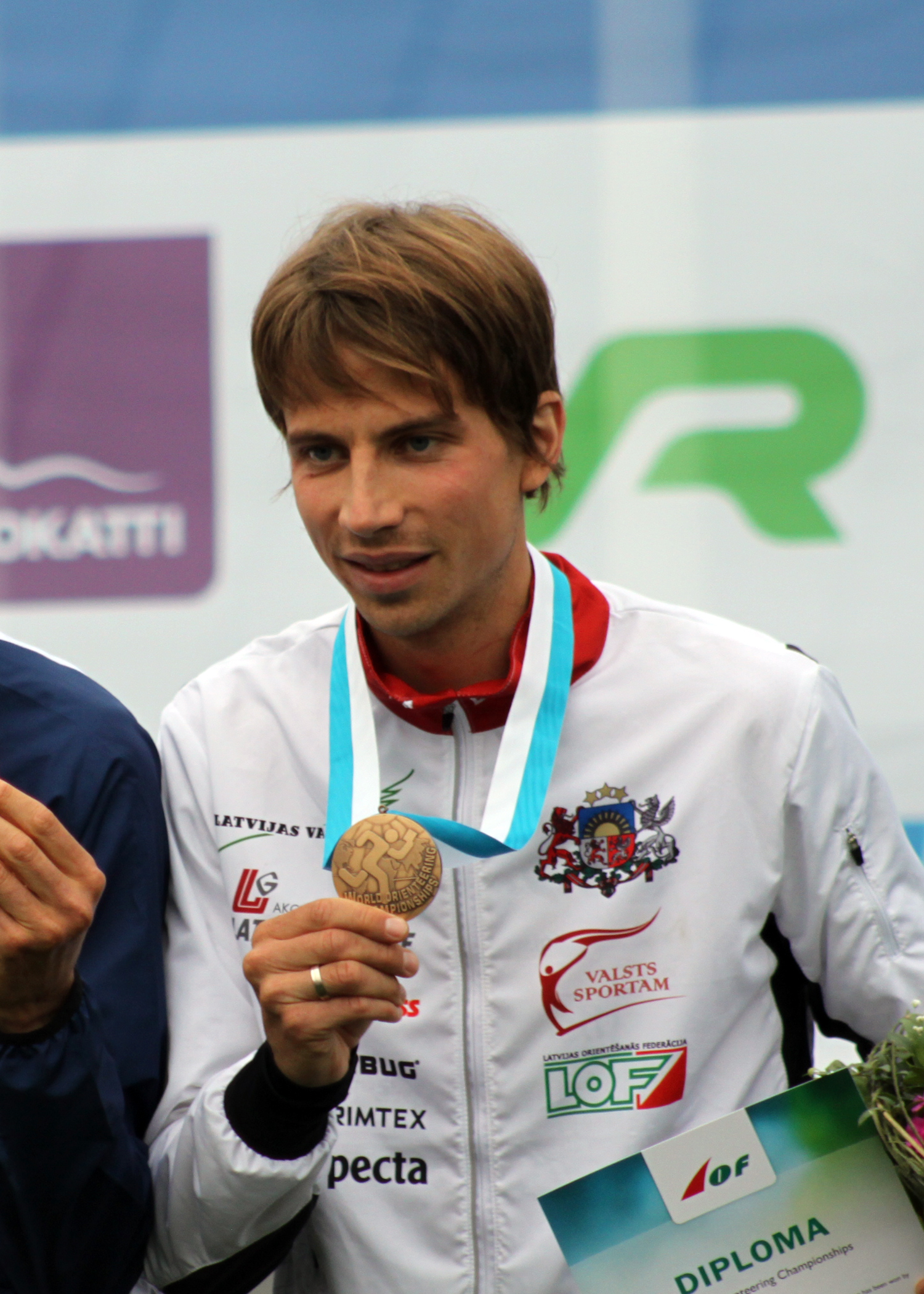
- Bertuks in 2013

Medal record

Men's orienteering

Representing Latvia

World Championships
Gold medal – first place	2012 Lausanne	Middle
Bronze medal – third place	2012 Lausanne	Long
Bronze medal – third place	2013 Vuokatti	Long

Edgars Bertuks (born January 1, 1985, in Alūksne) is a Latvian orienteering competitor and world champion. He won the middle distance at the 2012 World Orienteering Championships in Lausanne, five seconds ahead of silver medalist Valentin Novikov.
