= Peter Öberg (orienteer) =

Swedish orienteering competitor

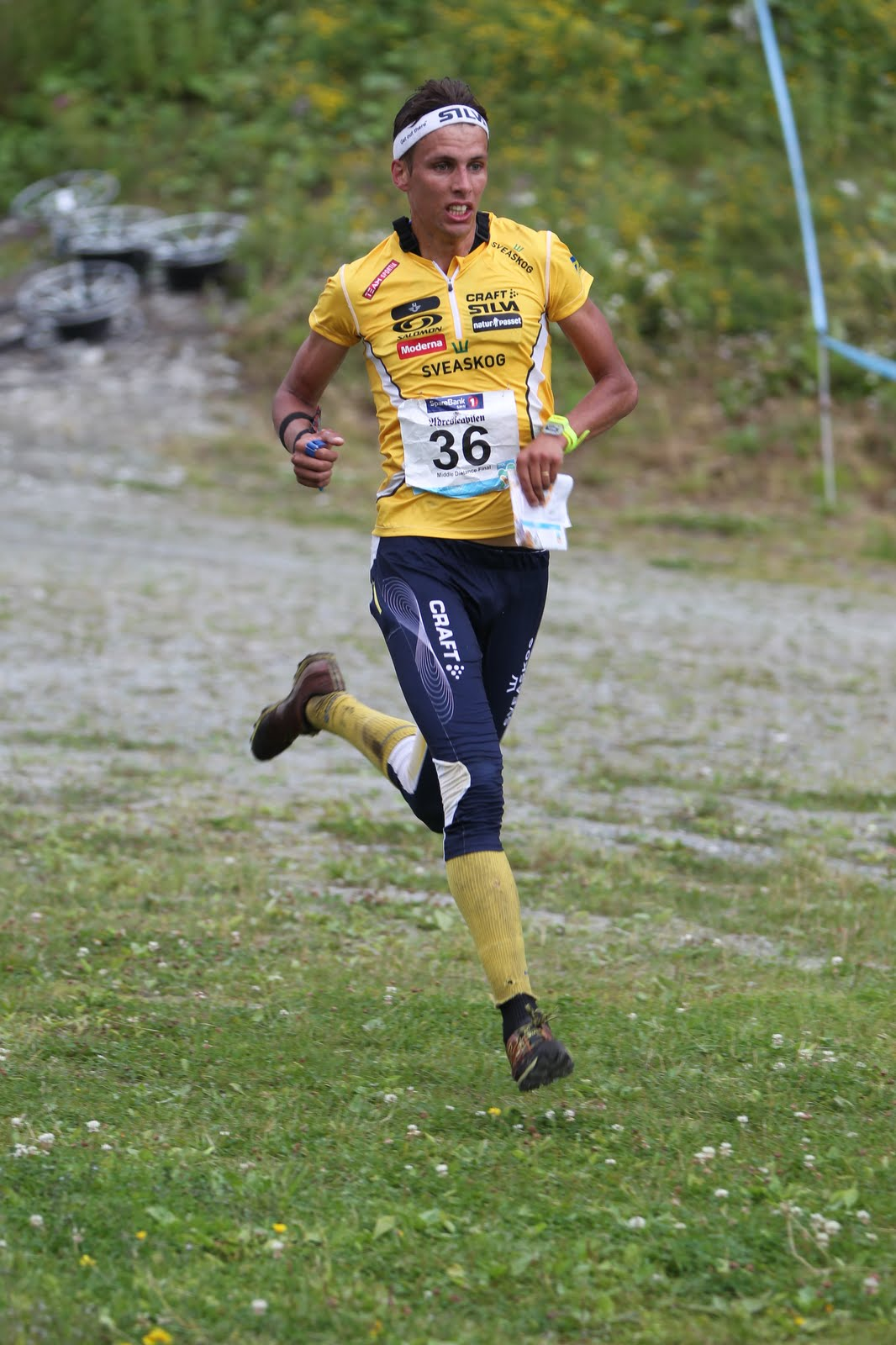
- Öberg in 2010

Medal record

Men's orienteering

Representing Sweden

World Championships
Silver medal – second place	2007 Kyiv	Relay
Silver medal – second place	2010 Trondheim	Middle
Silver medal – second place	2011 Savoie	Middle
Bronze medal – third place	2012 Lausanne	Relay
Silver medal – second place	2013 Vuokatti	Relay

World Cup
Bronze medal – third place	2009	WC Overall

European Championships
Gold medal – first place	2006 Otepää	Relay

Junior World Championships
Silver medal – second place	2000 Nove Mesto na Morave	Relay

Peter Öberg (born 17 April 1980) is a Swedish orienteering competitor and European champion.

He received a gold medal in relay at the European Orienteering Championships in 2006 in Otepää, together with Niclas Jonasson and David Andersson.

He received a silver medal in relay at the 2007 World Orienteering Championships in Kyiv, together with David Andersson and Emil Wingstedt.

Peter runs for the club OK Hällen in Stigtomta.
