= Andrey Khramov =

Russian orienteering competitor

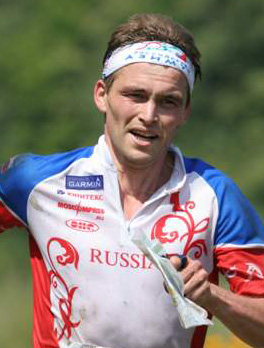
- Khramov in 2007

Personal information
- Nationality: Russian
- Born: 17 January 1981 (age 45) Baskhortostan

Sport
- Sport: Orienteering
Medal record
Men's orienteering
Representing Russia
World Championships
Gold medal – first place	2005 Aichi	Long
Gold medal – first place	2006 Aarhus	Relay
Gold medal – first place	2007 Kyiv	Relay
Gold medal – first place	2008 Olomouc	Sprint
Gold medal – first place	2009 Miskolc	Sprint
Gold medal – first place	2010 Trondheim	Relay
Silver medal – second place	2004 Västerås	Relay
Silver medal – second place	2007 Kyiv	Long
Silver medal – second place	2008 Olomouc	Relay
Silver medal – second place	2009 Miskolc	Relay
Bronze medal – third place	2006 Aarhus	Long
Bronze medal – third place	2014 Asiago-Lavarone	Mixed sprint Relay
Bronze medal – third place	2015 Inverness	Mixed sprint relay
World Cup
Gold medal – first place	2005	WC Overall
Silver medal – second place	2004	WC Overall
World Games
Gold medal – first place	2009 Kaohsiung	Sprint
Gold medal – first place	2009 Kaohsiung	Mixed Relay
Silver medal – second place	2013 Cali	Sprint
Bronze medal – third place	2009 Kaohsiung	Middle
Bronze medal – third place	2017 Wroclaw	Mixed relay
European Championships
Gold medal – first place	2008 Ventspils	Relay
Silver medal – second place	2004 Roskilde	Sprint
Bronze medal – third place	2006 Otepää	Sprint
Bronze medal – third place	2008 Ventspils	Sprint
Junior World Championships
Gold medal – first place	1999 Varna	Long
Gold medal – first place	2001 Miskolc	Long
Military World Games
Silver medal – second place	2019 Wuhan	Relay
Silver medal – second place	2019 Wuhan	Team

Andrey Mikhailovich Khramov (Russian: Андрей Михайлович Храмов; born 17 January 1981 in Baskhortostan) is a Russian orienteering competitor. He is winner of the 2005 World Orienteering Championships, Long distance, and finished third in 2006, and second in 2007. He is a three-time relay World Champion, in 2006, 2007 and 2010 as a member of the Russian winning teams, and earned a silver medal in 2004. He won the World Orienteering Championships in the sprint distance in Olomouc in 2008 and defended his title in Miskolc in 2009.

== Biography ==
Khramov was born January 17, 1981 in Ufa, Bashortostan.

== Career ==
In 1999, at the Junior World Championships in Bulgaria, he won the gold medal in the long distance.

In 2001, at the World Junior Championships in Hungary, he won a gold medal .

In 2005, at the World Championships in Japan, he won the gold medal (the first among Russian orienteers).

In 2006, at the World Championships in Denmark, the Russian men team (Roman Efimov, Andrey Khramov and Valentin Novikov) won the gold medal in the relay (for the first time in Russian history).

In 2008, at the World Championships in the Czech Republic, he won the gold medal in the sprint.
