= 2007 World Orienteering Championships =

2007 edition of the World Orienteering Championships

- Host city: Kyiv
- Country: Ukraine
- Events: 8

The 2007 World Orienteering Championships, the 24th World Orienteering Championships, were held in Kyiv, Ukraine, 18 –26 August 2007.

The championships had eight events; sprint for men and women, middle distance for men and women, long distance (formerly called individual or classic distance) for men and women, and relays for men and women.

== Medalists ==
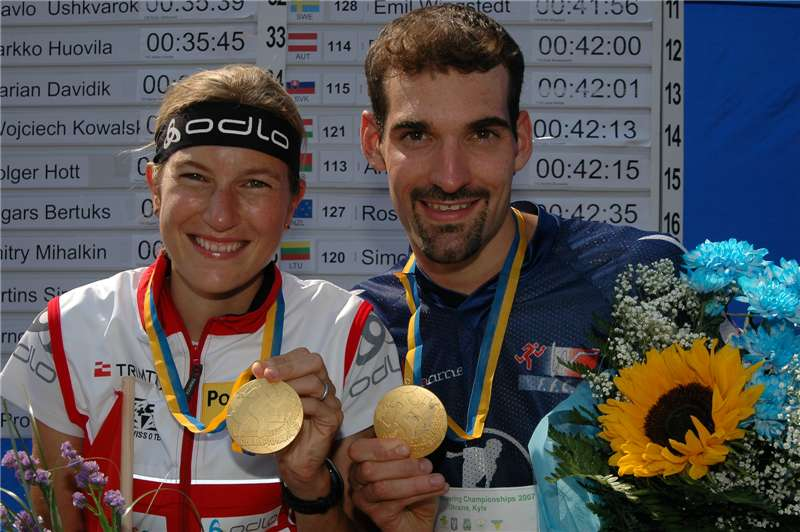
Simone Niggli-Luder and Thierry Gueorgiou, WOC 2007 middle distance champions

Event	Gold		Silver	Bronze
Men's sprint	Thierry Gueorgiou (FRA)	14:44.0	Matthias Merz (SUI)	Martin Johansson (SWE)
Women's sprint	Simone Niggli (SUI)	12:06.9	Minna Kauppi (FIN)	Lena Eliasson (SWE)
Men's middle distance	Thierry Gueorgiou (FRA)	32:21	Tero Föhr (FIN)	Valentin Novikov (RUS)
Women's middle distance	Simone Niggli (SUI)	32:13	Heli Jukkola (FIN)	Marianne Andersen (NOR)
Men's long distance	Matthias Merz (SUI)	1:44:28	Andrey Khramov (RUS)	Anders Nordberg (NOR)
Women's long distance	Minna Kauppi (FIN)	1:20:17	Heli Jukkola (FIN)	Simone Niggli (SUI)
Men's relay		2:10:26		
Women's relay		1:46:35		
