= 2009 World Orienteering Championships =

2009 edition of the World Orienteering Championships

- Host city: Miskolc
- Country: Hungary
- Events: 8

The 2009 World Orienteering Championships, the 26th World Orienteering Championships, were held in Miskolc, Hungary, 16–23 August 2009.

The championships had eight events; sprint for men and women, middle distance for men and women, long distance (formerly called individual or classic distance) for men and women, and relays for men and women.

== Medalists ==
Event	Gold		Silver	Bronze
Men's sprint	Andrey Khramov (RUS)	15:10.6	Fabian Hertner (SUI)	Daniel Hubmann (SUI)
Women's sprint	Helena Jansson (SWE)	15:07.8	Linnea Gustafsson (SWE)	Simone Niggli-Luder (SUI)
Men's middle distance	Thierry Gueorgiou (FRA)	37:14	Daniel Hubmann (SUI)	Matthias Merz (SUI)
Women's middle distance	Dana Brozkova (CZE)	37:09	Marianne Andersen (NOR)	Simone Niggli-Luder (SUI)
Men's long distance	Daniel Hubmann (SUI)	1:36:21	Thierry Gueorgiou (FRA)	Michael Mamleev (ITA)
Women's long distance	Simone Niggli-Luder (SUI)	1:17:26	Marianne Andersen (NOR)	Minna Kauppi (FIN)
Men's relay		2:22:48		
Women's relay	Norway (NOR): Betty Ann Bjerkreim Nilsen; Anne Margrethe Hausken; Marianne Andersen	2:13:10	Sweden (SWE): Karolina Arewång-Höjsgaard; Kajsa Nilsson; Helena Jansson	Finland (FIN): Bodil Holmström; Merja Rantanen; Minna Kauppi

== 2009 WOC injury ==
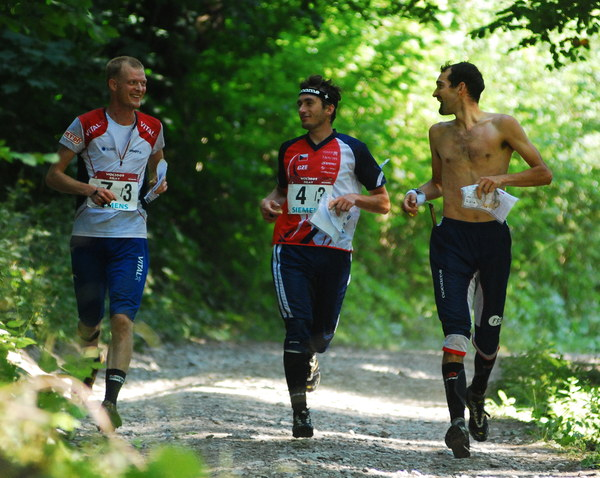
Nordberg, Smola, and Gueorgiou finishing the race after aiding Johansson

An incident occurred during the last leg of the men's relay which involved four of the leading teams. Sweden's Martin Johansson got seriously injured, and three of the other runners stopped for helping, calling for an ambulance and carrying him out of the wood.
