= Beata Falk =

Swedish orienteering competitor

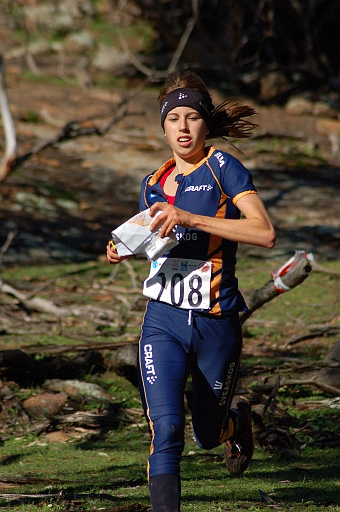
- Beate Falk at JWOC 2007

Personal information
- Born: February 17, 1989 (age 37)
Medal record
Women's orienteering
Representing Sweden
Junior World Championships
| Gold medal – first place | 2008 Göteborg | Relay |
| Silver medal – second place | 2008 Göteborg | Long |
| Silver medal – second place | 2008 Göteborg | Middle |

Beata Falk (born February 17, 1989) is a Swedish orienteering competitor, and junior world champion.

She became Junior World Champion in the relay in Gothenburg in 2008, together with Jenny Lönnkvist and Lina Strand, and received silver medals in the middle distance (behind Venla Niemi) and in the long course (behind Jenny Lönnkvist).

She competed at the 2010 World Orienteering Championships in Trondheim, where she qualified for the sprint final.
