= Kine Hallan Steiwer =

Norwegian orienteer (born 1988)

Medal record

Women's orienteering

Representing Norway

Junior World Championships
Gold medal – first place	2007 Dubbo	Relay
Silver medal – second place	2007 Dubbo	Long
Bronze medal – third place	2008 Göteborg	Relay

Kine Hallan Steiwer (born 23 May 1988) is a Norwegian orienteering competitor and junior world champion.

She won a gold medal in the relay at the 2007 Junior World Orienteering Championships in Dubbo, together with Silje Ekroll Jahren and Siri Ulvestad, in a close race with the Swedish team. She also received a silver medal in the long course.

At the 2008 Junior World Orienteering Championships in Gothenburg Steiwer, together with Annette Baklid and Mariann Ulvestad, ran for second team of Norway and brought home a bronze medal in the relay.

She is an older sister of Gaute Hallan Steiwer.
