= Silje Ekroll Jahren =

Norwegian orienteer (born 1988)

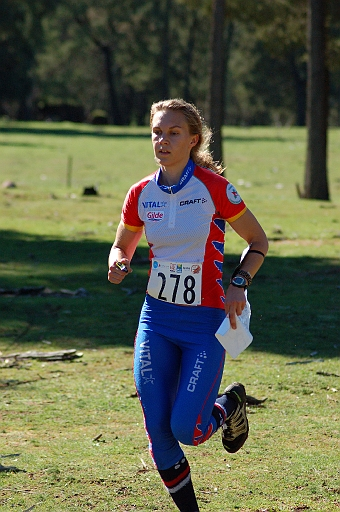
- Silje Ekroll Jahren at JWOC 2007

Personal information
- Born: 10 May 1988 (age 38)
Medal record
Women's orienteering
Representing Norway
World Championships
Bronze medal – third place	2012 Lausanne	Relay
Junior World Championships
Gold medal – first place	2007 Dubbo	Relay
Silver medal – second place	2006 Göteborg	Sprint

Silje Ekroll Jahren (born 10 May 1988) is a Norwegian orienteering competitor and junior world champion.

== Sports career ==
Jahren won a gold medal in the relay at the 2007 Junior World Orienteering Championships in Dubbo, Australia, together with Kine Hallan Steiwer and Siri Ulvestad, in a close race with the Swedish team.

She received a silver medal in sprint at the 2008 Junior World Orienteering Championships in Gothenburg, Sweden, finishing less than two seconds behind winner Emma Klingenberg.

She competed at the 2012 World Orienteering Championships. In the sprint competition she qualified for the final, where she placed 10th.

Her mother club is Raumar (Ullensaker), but she now represents Sävedalen AIK.

She has also competed in cross-country skiing, for Ullensaker SK.

In the last world cup of 2019, held in China at the end of October, she ranked 68.
