= Ulf Forseth Indgaard =

Norwegian orienteer (born 1989)

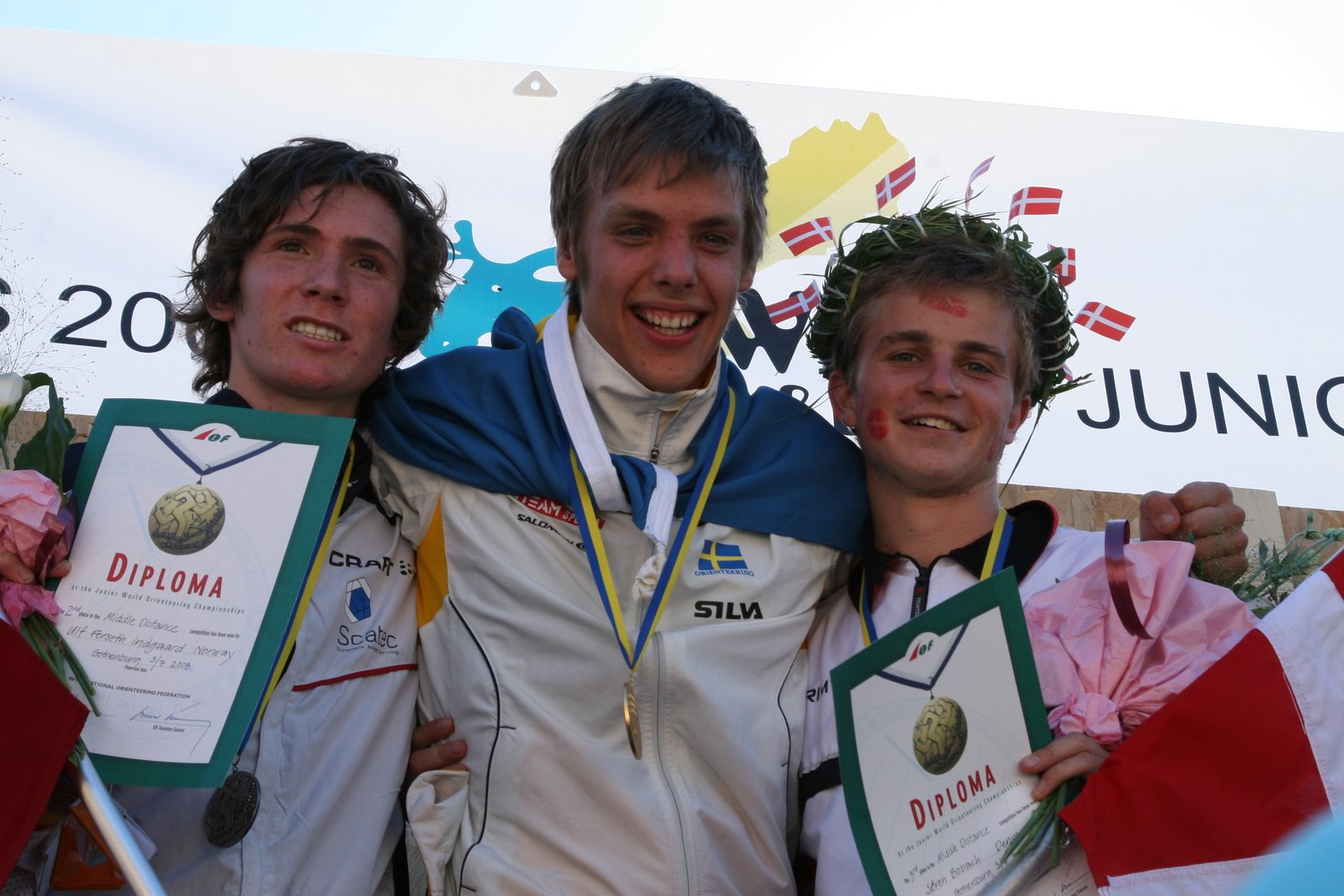
- Indgaard (left) with a silver medal of JWOC 2008

Personal information
- Born: 1989 (age 36–37)
Medal record
Men's orienteering
Representing Norway
Junior World Championships
Silver medal – second place	2008 Göteborg	Middle
Bronze medal – third place	2008 Göteborg	Relay
Bronze medal – third place	2009 Primiero	Middle

Ulf Forseth Indgaard (born 1989) is a Norwegian orienteering competitor who has received two medals at the Junior World Orienteering Championships.

He received a silver medal in the middle distance (behind Johan Runesson), and a bronze medal in the relay at the 2008 Junior World Orienteering Championships in Gothenburg.

He competed for Norway at the 2012 World Orienteering Championships. In the sprint competition he qualified for the final, where he placed 29th.

Ulf grew up just outside Levanger in Norway, on a farm called Flatåsen, with his parents, and two siblings. He runs for the orienteering club Frol IL, and his little brother Jo, is also a talentful orienteering runner.
