= Skarholt =

Skarholt is a surname. Notable people with the surname include:

- Amund Rasmussen Skarholt (1892–1956), Norwegian politician
- Anders Skarholt (born 1986), Norwegian orienteering competitor
- Ola Skarholt (1939–2017), Norwegian orienteering competitor
- The Rosensparre family, also known as the Skarholts, of Skarhult Castle
