= Järveoja =

Järveoja is an Estonian surname. It is a dithematic surname, consiting of two stems: järv, 'lake' and oja, 'stream'. Notable people with the surname include:

- Martin Järveoja (born 1987), Estonian rally co-driver
- Mihkel Järveoja (born 1986), Estonian orienteering competitor
- Toomas Järveoja (born 1961), Estonian politician
