= Lukkarinen =

Lukkarinen is a Finnish surname. Notable people with the surname include:

- Impi Lukkarinen (1918–2010), Finnish journalist and politician
- Marjut Rolig (born 1966), née Lukkarinen, Finnish cross-country skier
- Mari Lukkarinen, Finnish orienteering competitor
