= Jan Beneš (orienteer) =

Czech orienteering competitor

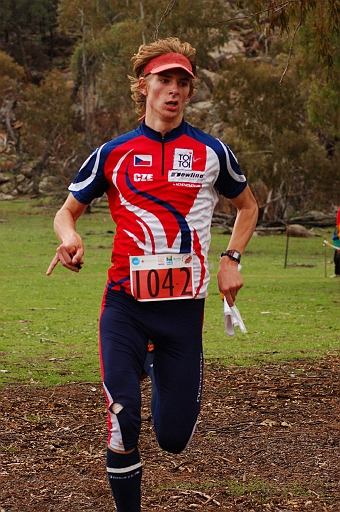
- Beneš at JWOC 2007

Medal record

Men's orienteering

Representing Czech Republic

Junior World Championships
Gold medal – first place	2006 Druskininkai	Middle
Gold medal – first place	2007 Dubbo	Relay
Silver medal – second place	2005 Tenero	Relay

Jan Beneš (born 29 September 1987 in Jilemnice, Czechoslovakia) is a Czech orienteering competitor and double junior world champion.

He became Junior World Champion in the middle distance in Druskininkai in 2006 (shared with Sören Bobach), and with the Czech team in relay in Dubbo in 2007, together with Štěpán Kodeda and Adam Chromý.

== See also ==
- Czech orienteers
- List of orienteers
- List of orienteering events
