= Michal Horáček (orienteer) =

Czech orienteering competitor

Medal record

Men's orienteering

Representing Czech Republic

World Championships
Bronze medal – third place	2001 Tampere	Relay

Junior World Championships
Gold medal – first place	1996 Govora	Relay
Silver medal – second place	1997 Leopoldsburg	Relay

Michal Horáček (born 1977) is a Czech orienteering competitor. He received a bronze medal in the relay at the 2001 World Orienteering Championships with the Czech team.

He participated in the World Cup in 1998 and 2000.

== See also ==
- Czech orienteers
- List of orienteers
- List of orienteering events
