= Olli Ojanaho =

Finnish orienteering competitor (born 1997)

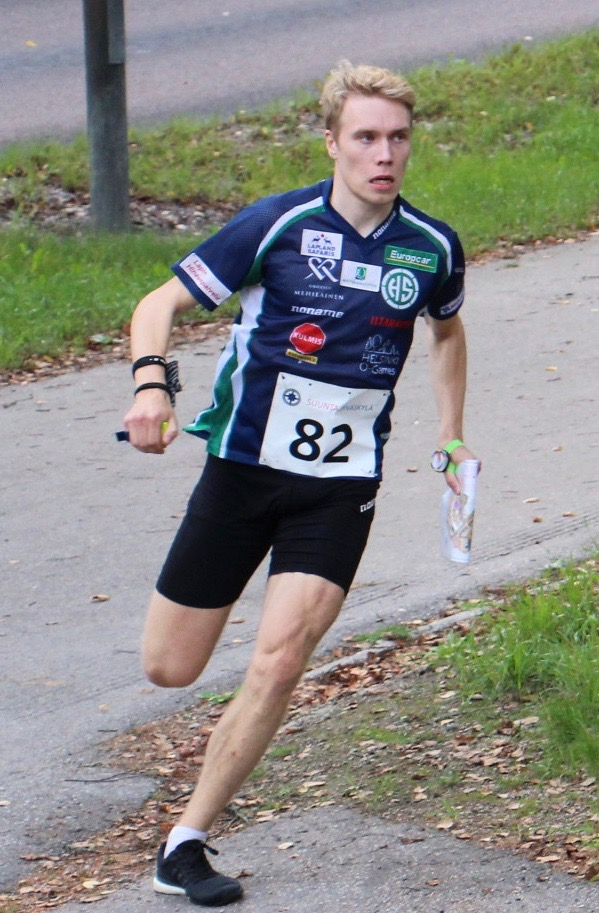
- Ojanaho IN 2019

Personal information
- Born: 25 February 1997 (age 29) Rovaniemi

Sport
- Sport: Orienteering
- Club: Helsingin Suunnistajat
Medal record
Men's orienteering
Representing Finland
World Championships
Silver medal – second place	2023 Flims-Laax	Relay
Bronze medal – third place	2023 Flims-Laax	Relay
Junior World Championships
Gold medal – first place	2017 Tampere	Sprint
Gold medal – first place	2017 Tampere	Middle
Gold medal – first place	2017 Tampere	Long
Gold medal – first place	2015 Rauland	Long
Gold medal – first place	2015 Rauland	Middle
Gold medal – first place	2015 Rauland	Relay
Silver medal – second place	2017 Tampere	Relay
Bronze medal – third place	2016 Engadin	Relay
Bronze medal – third place	2014 Borovets	Middle

Olli Ojanaho (born February 25, 1997) is a Finnish orienteering competitor. He was born in Rovaniemi and started his youth career representing the club Ounasvaaran Hiihtoseura. As of 2017 Ojanaho lives in Helsinki and represents Helsingin Suunnistajat.

== Junior career ==
Ojanaho made his debut at the Junior World Orienteering Championships (JWOC) in 2014 in Borovets, Bulgaria. At the age of 17, three years younger than his oldest competitors, he won a bronze medal at the middle distance. The following year, at the 2015 JWOC in Rauland, Norway, he won three gold medals after winning all three forest races: the long distance, the middle distance and the relay.

At the 2017 JWOC on home soil in Tampere, Ojanaho won all three individual races: the two individual forest races and the sprint. This feat was matched the same year by Swiss runner Simona Aebersold.

He is the most decorated male orienteer ever at the junior level after having won six gold, one silver and two bronze medals at the JWOC.

== Senior career ==
Ojanaho debuted at the senior championship level in 2017 when he represented Finland at the 2017 World Orienteering Championships (WOC) in Tartu, Estonia. The senior WOC was scheduled just one week ahead of the JWOC as doubling of the events and hence a conflicting programme for the athletes is normally not an issue. Ojanaho finished 27th in the middle distance. At WOC 2021 in Czech Republic his best position was a 4th place in relay. At WOC 2023 in Switzerland he won a bronze medal at long distance and a silver medal in the relay together with Topi Syrjalainen and Miika Kirmula

== World Championship results ==
Year
Year	Age	Long	Middle	Sprint	Relay	Sprint; Relay
2017	20	—	27	—	—	-
2018	21	ill: did not compete				
2021	24	11	26	-	4	-
2023	26	3	6	-	2	-
