= Adam Chromý =

Czech orienteering competitor

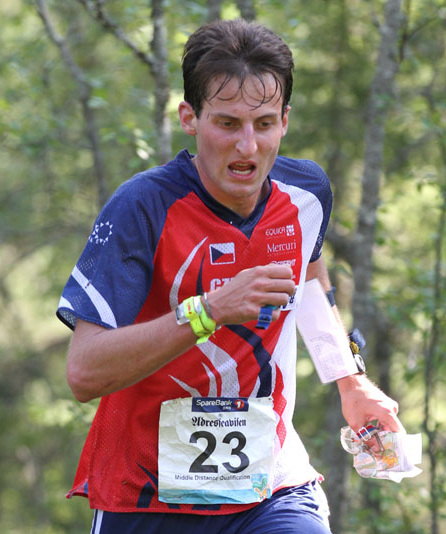

Personal information
- Born: 24 June 1988 (age 38) Brno
Medal record
Men's orienteering
Representing Czech Republic
Junior World Championships
Gold medal – first place	2007 Dubbo	Relay
Silver medal – second place	2005 Tenero	Relay
Tiomila
Gold medal – first place	2014 Eksjö	Relay
Gold medal – first place	2011 Tullinge	Relay
Gold medal – first place	2010 Finspång	Relay
World University Championships
Bronze medal – third place	2012 Alicante	Middle
Bronze medal – third place	2012 Alicante	Long

Adam Chromý (born 24 June 1988) is a Czech orienteering competitor and junior world champion.

== Career ==
Chromý became Junior World Champion with the Czech team in the relay in Dubbo in 2007, together with Štěpán Kodeda and Jan Beneš. He received a silver medal in 2005. He is a member of the Czech Orienteering Team, and started at the World Orienteering Championships in 2010 (Norway) and 2011 (France). He participated in the European Orienteering Championships in 2010 (Bulgaria) and 2012 (Sweden). He won two bronze medals at the World University Orienteering Championships in Spain in 2012.

Chromý is now a member of the Finnish orienteering club Kalevan Rasti. As a member of this team, he won Tiomila in 2010, 2011 and 2014.

== See also ==
- Czech orienteers
- List of orienteers
- List of orienteering events
