= Dmitry Nakonechny =

Russian orienteering competitor

Medal record

Men's orienteering

Representing Russia

Junior World Championships
Gold medal – first place	2011 Wejherowo	Middle

Military World Games
Silver medal – second place	2019 Wuhan	Relay
Silver medal – second place	2019 Wuhan	Team

Dmitry Nakonechny (Russian: Дмитрий Наконечный; born 1991) is a Russian orienteering competitor and junior world champion.

He won a gold medal in the middle distance at the 2011 Junior World Orienteering Championships. He competed at the 2012 World Orienteering Championships. In the sprint competition he qualified for the final, where he placed 38th.
