= Marius Bjugan =

Norwegian orienteer (born 1981)

Personal information
- Born: 6 April 1981 (age 45)

Sport
- Sport: Orienteering
- Club: Wing OK; Halden SK
Medal record
Men's orienteering
Representing Norway
Junior World Championships
Gold medal – first place	2001 Miskolc	Middle distance

Marius Bjugan (born 6 April 1981) is a Norwegian orienteering competitor. He won a gold medal in the middle distance at the 2001 Junior World Orienteering Championships in Miskolc.

He won Tiomila with Halden SK in 2006. He won Tiomila a second time with Halden SK in 2007, when Halden SK won their eighth victory in the relay. He represented Norway at the 2008 World Orienteering Championships in Olomouc. With his club Halden SK, Bjugan won the 2011 Jukola relay. He competed nine times in the Jukola, including three times for Halden 1; running leg five for Halden in 2008, he was the fastest runner (among 1288) on this leg, when Halden SK placed fifth in the relay.

Bjugan has been described as a strong sprinter.
