= Gaute Hallan Steiwer =

Norwegian orienteer (born 1990)

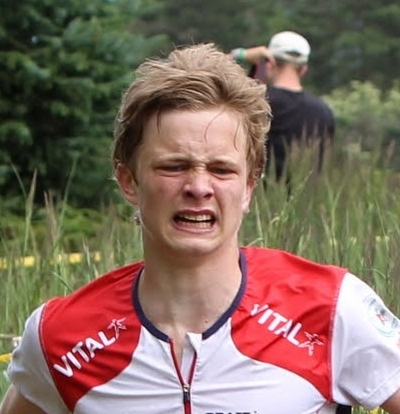

Personal information
- Born: 31 January 1990 (age 36) Oslo, Norway

Sport
- Sport: Orienteering
- Club: Fredrikstad Skiklubb
Medal record
Men's orienteering
Representing Norway
World Championships
Gold medal – first place	2018 Riga	Relay
Junior World Championships
Gold medal – first place	2010 Aalborg	Middle
Gold medal – first place	2010 Aalborg	Relay

Gaute Hallan Steiwer (born 31 January 1990) is a Norwegian orienteering competitor. He was born in Oslo.

He won gold medals in the middle distance and in the relay at the 2010 Junior World Orienteering Championships in Aalborg.

He won a gold medal in the relay at the 2018 World Orienteering Championships in Latvia, together with Eskil Kinneberg and Magne Dæhli. Steiwer was running the first leg of the relay, and came second to the first change-over, 18 seconds behind then leading Latvia.

He is a younger brother of Kine Hallan Steiwer.
