= Torunn Fossli Sæthre =

Norwegian orienteer (born 1970)

Medal record

Women's orienteering

Representing Norway

World Championships
Silver medal – second place	1997 Grimstad	Relay

Junior World Championships
Gold medal – first place	1990 Älvsbyn	Individual
Gold medal – first place	1990 Älvsbyn	Relay

Torunn Fossli Sæthre (born 16 January 1970) is a Norwegian orienteering competitor and junior world champion.

She received a silver medal in relay at the 1997 World Orienteering Championships in Grimstad, together with Elisabeth Ingvaldsen, Hanne Sandstad and Hanne Staff. She finished 4th in the short course and 9th in the classic course West Point in 1993, and 17th in the short distance in 1995, and 18th in 1997.

She finished overall 11th in the 1992 World Cup, 14th in 1994, and 21st in 1996.

She won a gold medal in the individual event at the 1990 Junior World Orienteering Championships.

She represented the sports club NTHI.
