= Zsuzsa Fey =

Romanian orienteering competitor

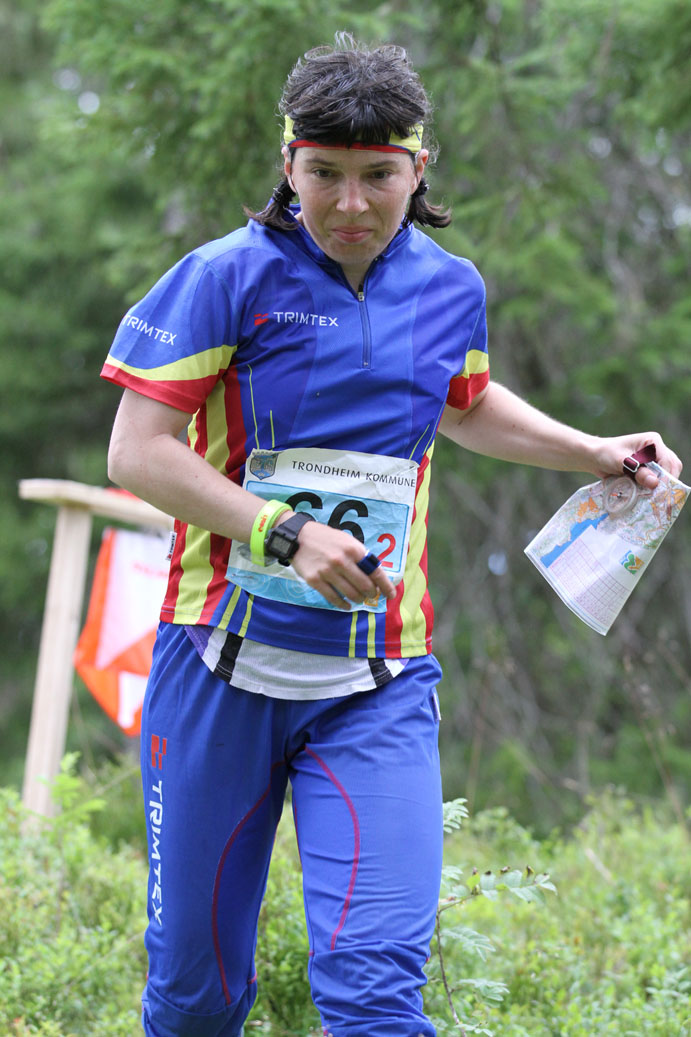
- Fey at WOC 2010

Personal information
- Nationality: Romanian
- Born: 12 June 1976 (age 50)
Medal record
Women's orienteering
Representing Romania
Junior World Championships
Gold medal – first place	1996 Govora	Relay

Zsuzsa Fey (born 12 June 1976) is a Romanian orienteering competitor. She won a gold medal in the relay event at the 1996 Junior World Orienteering Championships in Govora.

She has represented Romania several times at the World Orienteering Championships. In 2001, she finished 20th in the sprint distance. In 2003, she finished 16th in the sprint, 15th in the long distance, and 13th in the middle distance. In 2004, she finished 11th in the sprint, 18th in the long, and 19th in the middle. In 2005, she finished 19th in the sprint, 8th in the middle, 14th in the long distance, and 17th in the relay event. In 2006, she finished 22nd in the long distance, in 2007 26th in the long, and in 2008 she finished 28th in the long distance.

An emigrant to Norway, she represents IL Tyrving in orienteering as well as mountain running.
