= Martina Fritschy =

Swiss orienteering competitor

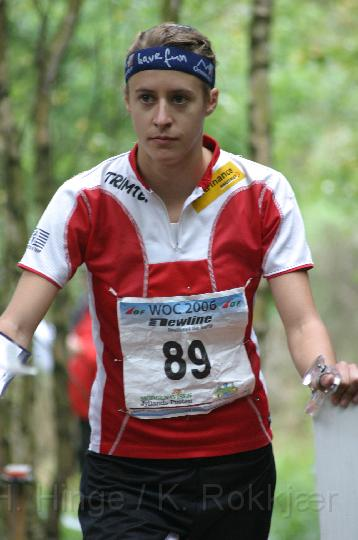
- M.Fritschy at WOC 2006 Long Final

Medal record

Women's orienteering

Representing Switzerland

World Championships
Bronze medal – third place	2006 Aarhus	Relay

Nordic Championships
Silver medal – second place	2007 Bornholm	Relay

Junior World Championships
Gold medal – first place	2002 Alicante	Relay
Bronze medal – third place	2002 Alicante	Short

Martina Fritschy (born 22 July 1983) is a Swiss orienteering competitor. She received a bronze medal on the relay at the 2006 World Orienteering Championships in Aarhus. She retired from her professional sports career in 2007 and is now an artist working and living in Bern and Zurich, Switzerland.
