= Markus Puusepp =

Estonian orienteer

Medal record

Representing Estonia

Junior World Championships
Gold medal – first place	2006 Druskininkai	Relay
Bronze medal – third place	2006 Druskininkai	Long

Markus Puusepp (born March 6, 1986, in Võru) is a former Estonian orienteering competitor and junior world champion.

He became Junior World Champion in the relay in Druskininkai in 2006, together with Mihkel Järveoja and Timo Sild. He received a bronze medal in the long course at the same championship.

He competed at the 2009 World Orienteering Championships in Miskolc, Hungary.

He was the event director for 2017 World Orienteering Championships in Tartu, Estonia.

== See also ==
- Estonian orienteers
- List of orienteers
- List of orienteering events
