= Isac von Krusenstierna =

Swedish orienteering competitor

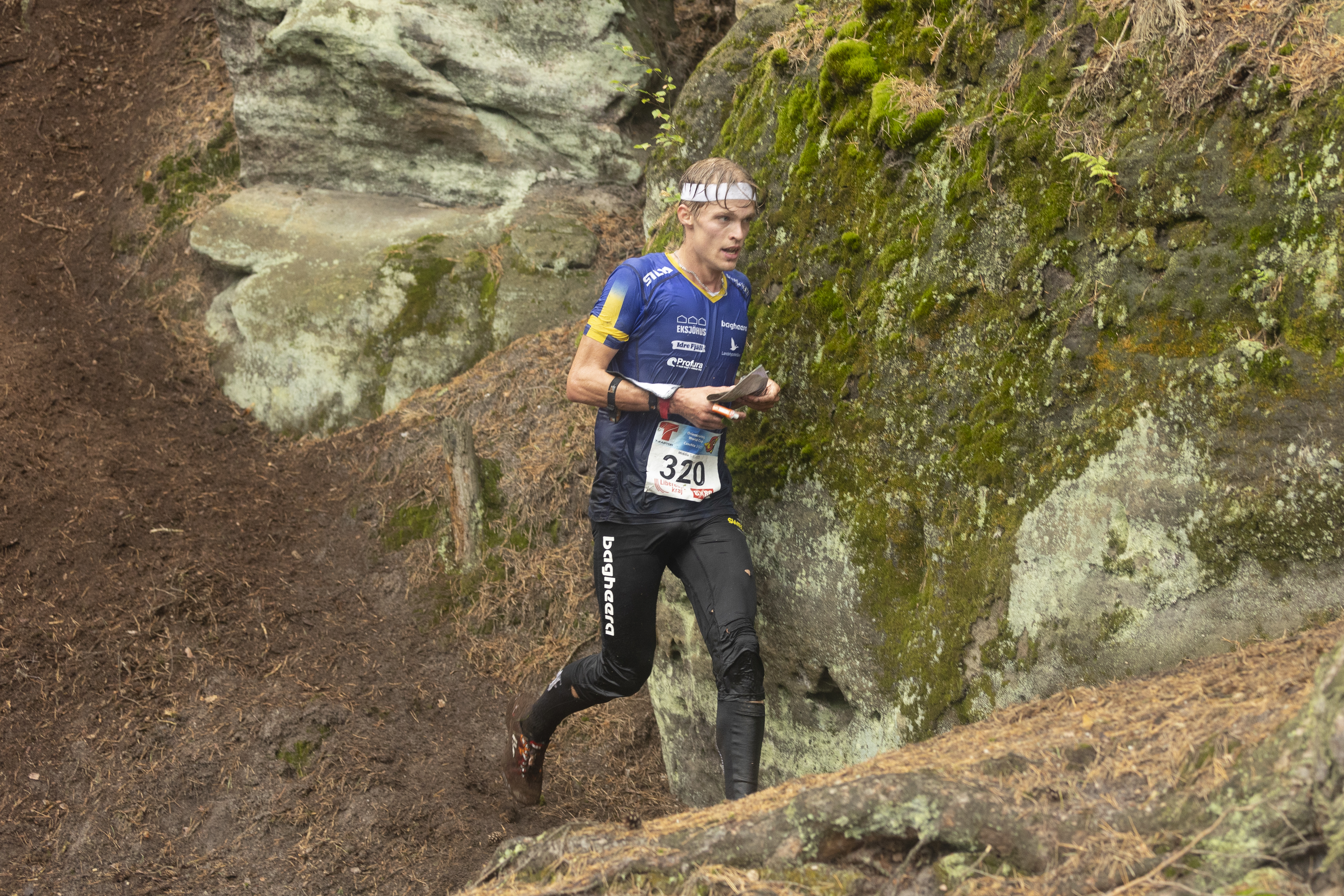

Personal information
- Nationality: Swedish
- Born: 1998 (age 27–28)

Sport
- Sport: Orienteering
- Club: OK Kåre
Medal record
Representing Sweden
Men's orienteering
World Championships
Bronze medal – third place	2026 Genova	Knockout sprint
Gold medal – first place	2021 Doksy	Sprint
Junior World Championships
Silver medal – second place	2016 Engadin	Relay
Silver medal – second place	2018 Kecskemét	Relay
Bronze medal – third place	2016 Engadin	Long
Bronze medal – third place	2016 Engadin	Sprint

Isac von Krusenstierna (born 14 January 1998) is a Swedish orienteering competitor who represents the club OK Kåre.

== Biography ==
Krusenstierna won a gold medal in sprint at the 2021 World Orienteering Championships in Doksy, ahead of Kasper Fosser. At the 2026 World Orienteering Championships in Genova von Krusenstierna won a bronze medal in knockout sprint, in spite of a fall just before the finish.

In the 2016 Junior World Orienteering Championships, he received three medals, with a silver in the relay event and bronze medals in the classic and sprint. He won an additional silver medal in the 2018 relay event, held in Hungary.
