= Eugenia Belova =

Russian orienteering competitor

Medal record

Women's orienteering

Representing Russia

Junior World Championships
Gold medal – first place	1999 Varna	Relay
Gold medal – first place	2000 Nové Město na Moravě	Relay

Eugenia Belova is a Russian orienteering competitor, and two times junior world champion in relay.

== Junior career ==
She won a gold medal in the relay at the 1999 Junior World Orienteering Championships in Varna, together with Tatiana Kostyleva and Tatiana Pereliaeva. She also received a gold medal in the relay also in 2000, together with Yulia Sedina and Tatiana Pereliaeva.
