= Marián Dávidík =

Slovak orienteering competitor (born 1977)

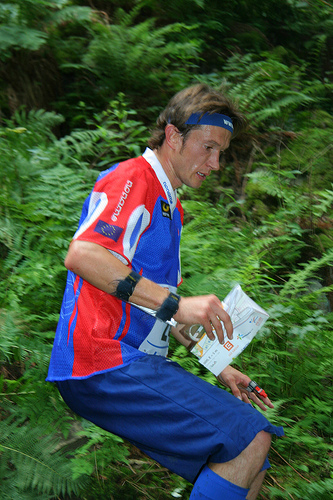
- Dávidík at WOC 2008. Middle.

Personal information
- Nationality: Slovak
- Born: 18 November 1977 (age 48) Dolný Kubín

Sport
- Sport: Orienteering
Medal record
Men's orienteering
Representing Slovakia
European Championships
Silver medal – second place	2000 Truskavets	Classic
Junior World Championships
Silver medal – second place	1996 Băile Govora	Govora
Bronze medal – third place	1997 Leopoldsburg	Classic
Bronze medal – third place	1997 Leopoldsburg	Relay

Marián Dávidík (born 18 November 1977 in Dolný Kubín) is a Slovak orienteering competitor. He received a silver medal in the classic distance at the 2000 European Orienteering Championships in Truskavets.
