= Johan Modig =

Swedish orienteering competitor (born 1977)

Medal record

Men's orienteering

Representing Sweden

European Championships
Bronze medal – third place	2004 Roskilde	Relay

Junior World Championships
Gold medal – first place	1997 Leopoldsburg	Classic
Gold medal – first place	1997 Leopoldsburg	Relay
Silver medal – second place	1996 Govora	Short distance

Johan Modig (born 30 June 1977) is a Swedish orienteering competitor.

He received a bronze medal in the relay at the 2004 European Orienteering Championships in Roskilde, with Kalle Dalin and Emil Wingstedt.

He is junior world champion in the classic distance from 1997, and received a silver medal in 1996.

Johan has bachelor's degree in mathematics and master's degree in German
