= Jan Petržela =

Czech orienteer (born 1992)

Personal information
- Born: 24 September 1992 (age 33)

Sport
- Sport: Orienteering
- Club: Kalevan rasti; OK 99 Hradec Kralove
Medal record
Representing Czech Republic
Men's orienteering
European Championships
Silver medal – second place	2014 Palmela	Relay
Bronze medal – third place	2016 Jeseník	Relay
Junior World Championships
Silver medal – second place	2012 Košice	Middle
Silver medal – second place	2012 Košice	Sprint

Jan Petržela (born 24 September 1992) is a Czech orienteer.

He won a silver medal in the relay with the Czech team at the 2014 European Orienteering Championships in Palmela, and a bronze medal in the relay at the 2016 European Orienteering Championships in Jeseník.

At the 2017 World Orienteering Championships in Tartu, Estonia, he placed 22nd in the middle distance, 25th in the sprint final, and 11th in the relay with the Czech team.
