= Fredrik Löwegren =

Swedish orienteering competitor

Medal record

Men's orienteering

Representing Sweden

European Championships
Silver medal – second place	2002 Sümeg	Relay
Bronze medal – third place	2000 Truskavets	Relay

Junior World Championships
Gold medal – first place	1991 Berlin	Relay
Bronze medal – third place	1992 Jyväskylä	Classic
Bronze medal – third place	1992 Jyväskylä	Relay

Fredrik Löwegren (born 18 September 1973) is a Swedish orienteering competitor. He received a bronze medal in the relay event at the 2000 European Orienteering Championships in Truskavets, and a silver medal in 2002. He placed 46th in the overall Orienteering World Cup in 1996, 13th in 1998, 23rd in 2000, and 17th in 2002.

He won the 5-days event O-Ringen in 1999.

Löwegren became Junior World Champion in relay in 1991.
