= Silja Tarvonen =

Finnish orienteer

Medal record

Women's orienteering

Representing Finland

Junior World Championships
| Gold medal – first place | 2003 Põlva | Relay |
| Gold medal – first place | 2004 Gdańsk | Long |
| Silver medal – second place | 2004 Gdańsk | Relay |
| Bronze medal – third place | 2005 Tenero | Relay |

Silja Tarvonen (born 4 April 1985) is a Finnish orienteering competitor and junior world champion.

She became Junior World Champion in the relay in Põlva in 2003, and in the long course in Gdańsk in 2004.

== See also ==
- Finnish orienteers
- List of orienteers
- List of orienteering events
