= Saila Kinni =

Finnish orienteering competitor (born 1987)

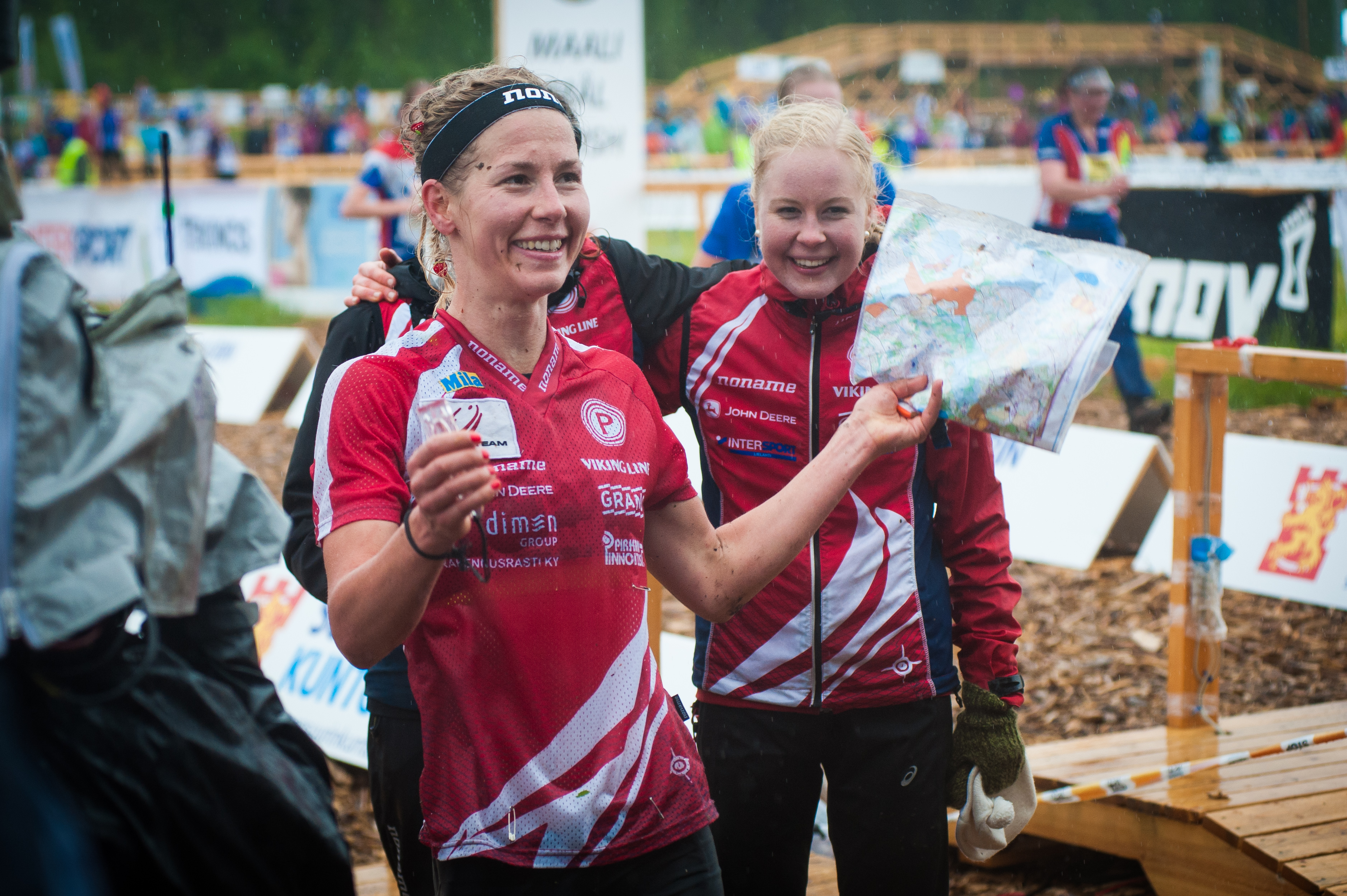
- Image of Kinni at a relay

Medal record

Women's orienteering

Representing Finland

Junior World Championships
| Bronze medal – third place | 2005 Tenero | Relay |
| Bronze medal – third place | 2006 Druskininkai | Relay |
| Bronze medal – third place | 2007 Dubbo | Middle |

Saila Kinni (born 2 July 1987) is a Finnish orienteering competitor.

She won three bronze medals at the Junior World Orienteering Championships, during the 2005, 2006 and 2007 championships. She competed at the 2012 World Orienteering Championships. In the middle distance she qualified for the final, where she placed 10th.
