= Ida Marie Bjørgul =

Norwegian orienteer (born 1988)

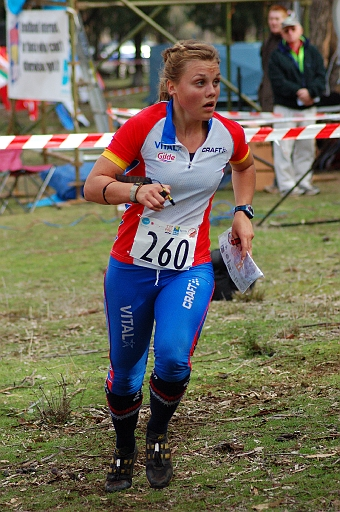
- Bjørgul at JWOC 2007

Personal information
- Born: 1988 (age 37–38) Halden, Norway

Sport
- Sport: Orienteering
- Club: Paimion Rasti (FIN); Halden SK (NOR)
Medal record
Women's orienteering
Representing Norway
Junior World Championships
Silver medal – second place	2007 Dubbo	Middle

Ida Marie Bjørgul (born 1988) is a Norwegian orienteering competitor, born in Halden and residing in Turku, Finland.

She represented her country at two Junior World Orienteering Championships. She received a silver medal in the middle distance at the 2007 Junior World Orienteering Championships in Dubbo. In Gothenburg in 2008 she finished 12th in sprint, 16th in the middle, and 11th in the long course.

She competed at the 2012 World Orienteering Championships. In the middle distance she qualified for the final, where she placed 30th. She also competed at the 2015, 2016 and 2017 World Orienteering Championships.
