= Anni-Maija Fincke =

Finnish orienteering competitor

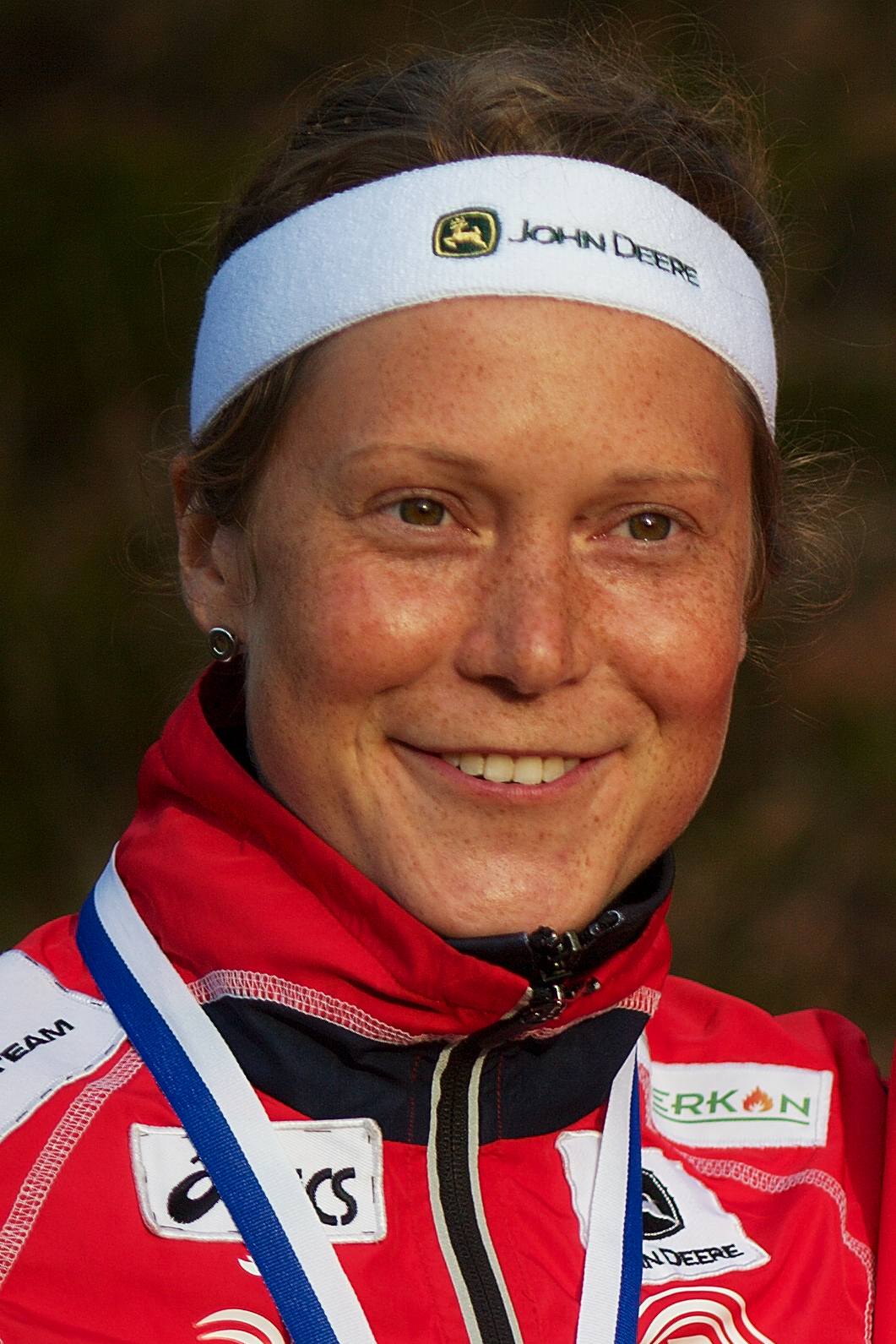
- Fincke in 2011

Medal record

Women's orienteering

Representing Finland

World Championships
Gold medal – first place	2010 Trondheim	Relay
Gold medal – first place	2011 Savoie	Relay

European Championships
Silver medal – second place	2010 Primorsko	Relay

Junior World Championships
Silver medal – second place	2003 Põlva	Long
Silver medal – second place	2004 Gdańsk	Relay
Bronze medal – third place	2004 Gdańsk	Middle

Anni-Maija Fincke (21 january 1984) is a Finnish orienteering competitor.

She participated at the 2009 World Orienteering Championships in Miskolc, where she placed 6th in the sprint and 7th in the middle distance. She won a silver medal in the relay with the Finnish team at the 2010 European Orienteering Championships in Primorsko.
