= Anna Persson =

Medal record

Women's orienteering

Representing Sweden

Junior World Championships
Gold medal – first place	2004 Gdańsk	Relay
Gold medal – first place	2005 Tenero	Middle
Silver medal – second place	2005 Tenero	Relay
Silver medal – second place	2006 Druskininkai	Relay

Anna Persson (born February 22, 1986) is a Swedish orienteering competitor and junior world champion.

She became Junior World Champion in the relay in Gdańsk in 2004, together with Elina Skantze and Helena Jansson, and received an individual gold medal in the middle distance in Tenero in 2005. She received silver medals in the relay event in 2005 and in 2006.
