= Šárka Svobodná =

Czech orienteering competitor (born 1988)

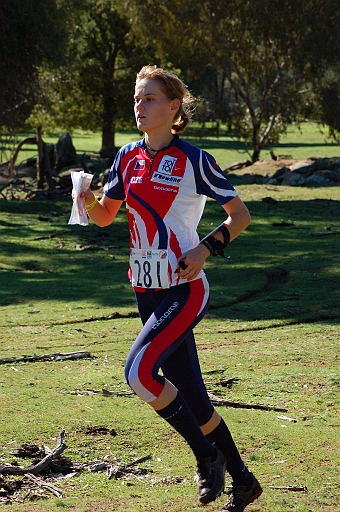
- Svobodná at JWOC 2007

Medal record

Women's orienteering

Representing Czech Republic

Junior World Championships
Silver medal – second place	2007 Dubbo	Sprint

Šárka Svobodná (born 27.11.1988) is a Czech orienteering competitor.

She received a silver medal in sprint and finished 8th in the middle distance at the Junior World Orienteering Championships in Dubbo in 2007. She finished 5th in the relay with the Czech relay team.

She finished 4th in the sprint at the 2008 junior world championships, 4.4 seconds behind the winner.

== Sports career ==
=== Location on MS and ME ===
Overview of successes at the World Cup
World Cup	Sprint	Middle	Long	Relays
Trondheim 2010	23rd place	X	X	X

Overview of successes at the European Championships
European Championships	Sprint	Middle	Long	Relays
Primorsko 2010	15th place	11th place	16th place	6th place

Overview of successes at the Junior World Championships
Junior World Championships	Sprint	Middle	Long	Relays
Dubbo 2006	2nd place	8th place	18th place	5th place

=== Location on Championship ===
Placement at the Championship of the Czech Republic in orienteering
Year of studies	Category	Classic track	Short track	Sprint	Long track	Night
MČR 2002	D16 - younger adolescents	27th place				
MČR 2003	D16 - younger adolescents	2nd place				
MČR 2004	D16 - younger adolescents	12th place	2nd place	8th place		
MČR 2004	D18 - older teenagers				15th place	
MČR 2005	D18 - older teenagers	6th place	1st place	1st place	13th place	
MČR 2006	D18 - older teenagers	1st place	12th place	4th place		
MČR 2007	D20 - juniors	3rd place	1st place	2nd place	9th place	
MČR 2008	D20 - juniors	5th place	4th place		1st place	
MČR 2009	D21 - women	13th place	18th place	3rd place	8th place	
MČR 2010	D21 - women	15th place	6th place	11th place	2nd place	
MČR 2011	D21 - women	6th place	10th place	3rd place		
MČR 2012	D21 - women	16th place				
MČR 2013	D21 - women	22nd place		6th place		
MČR 2014	D21 - women			8th place		
MČR 2015	D21 - women			10th place		

== See also ==
- Czech orienteers
- List of orienteers
- List of orienteering events
