= Timo Sild =

Estonian orienteer (born 1988)

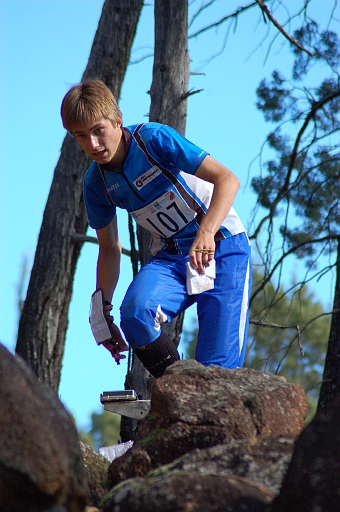
- Sild at JWOC 2007

Medal record

Men's orienteering

Representing Estonia

Junior World Championships
Gold medal – first place	2006 Druskininkai	Relay
Silver medal – second place	2008 Göteborg	Long

Timo Sild (born February 26, 1988) is an Estonian orienteering competitor and junior world champion.

== Family ==
Timo is the elder son of orienteers Sixten Sild of Estonia and Sarmite Sild of Latvia. His younger brother is called Lauri Sild.

== Career ==
=== Junior World Championships ===
He became Junior World Champion in the relay in Druskininkai in 2006, together with Mihkel Järveoja and Markus Puusepp. He received a silver medal in the long distance in 2008.

=== Senior career ===
Sild has competed in the 2013, 2014, 2015, 2016 and 2017 World Orienteering Championships, as part of the Estonian relay team as well as in individual distances.

== See also ==
- Estonian orienteers
- List of orienteers
- List of orienteering events
