= Line Hagman =

Norwegian orienteer (born 1983)

Personal information
- Born: 1983 (age 42–43) Oppegård, Norway
- Home town: Trondheim

Sport
- Sport: Orienteering
- Club: NTNUI
Medal record
Women's orienteering
Representing Norway
Junior World Championships
Bronze medal – third place	2003 Põlva	Relay

Line Hagman (born 1983) is a Norwegian orienteering competitor, born in Oppegård. At the 2003 Junior World Orienteering Championships in Põlva she placed fifth in the long distance and won a bronze medal in the relay with the Norwegian team. She competed at the 2004 World Orienteering Championships in Västerås, where she placed 10th in the sprint. At the 2007 World Orienteering Championships in Kyiv she competed in the middle distance, placing 31st. She also competed at the 2010 World Orienteering Championships, where she placed 12th in the middle distance.
