= Olle Boström =

Swedish orienteer

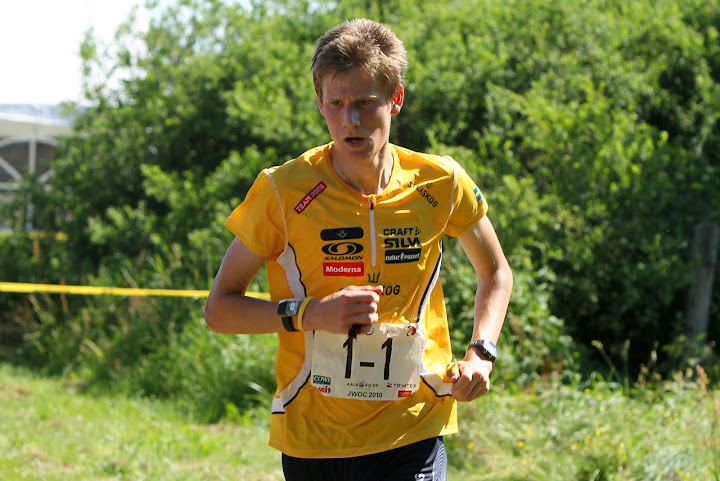
- Boström in 2010

Medal record

Men's orienteering

Representing Sweden

World Championships
Bronze medal – third place	2011 Savoie	Relay
Bronze medal – third place	2015 Inverness	Middle

Junior World Championships
Gold medal – first place	2008 Gothenburg	Relay
Gold medal – first place	2009 Primiero	Relay
Silver medal – second place	2010 Aalborg	Relay
Bronze medal – third place	2010 Aalborg	Middle

Olle Boström (born 19 November 1990) is a Swedish orienteering competitor. He placed sixth in the long course at the 2011 World Orienteering Championships in Chambéry, and won a bronze medal with the Swedish relay team.

He won two gold medals in the relay with the Swedish team at the Junior World Orienteering Championships, in 2008 and 2009.
