= Mihkel Järveoja =

Estonian orienteer

Medal record

Representing Estonia

Junior World Championships
Gold medal – first place	2006 Druskininkai	Relay

Mihkel Järveoja (born 30 April 1986) is an Estonian orienteering competitor and junior world champion.

He was born in Põlva.

He became Junior World Champion in the relay in Druskininkai in 2006, together with Markus Puusepp and Timo Sild.

He has won several medals at Estonian orienteering championships.
