= Johan Runesson =

Swedish orienteering competitor

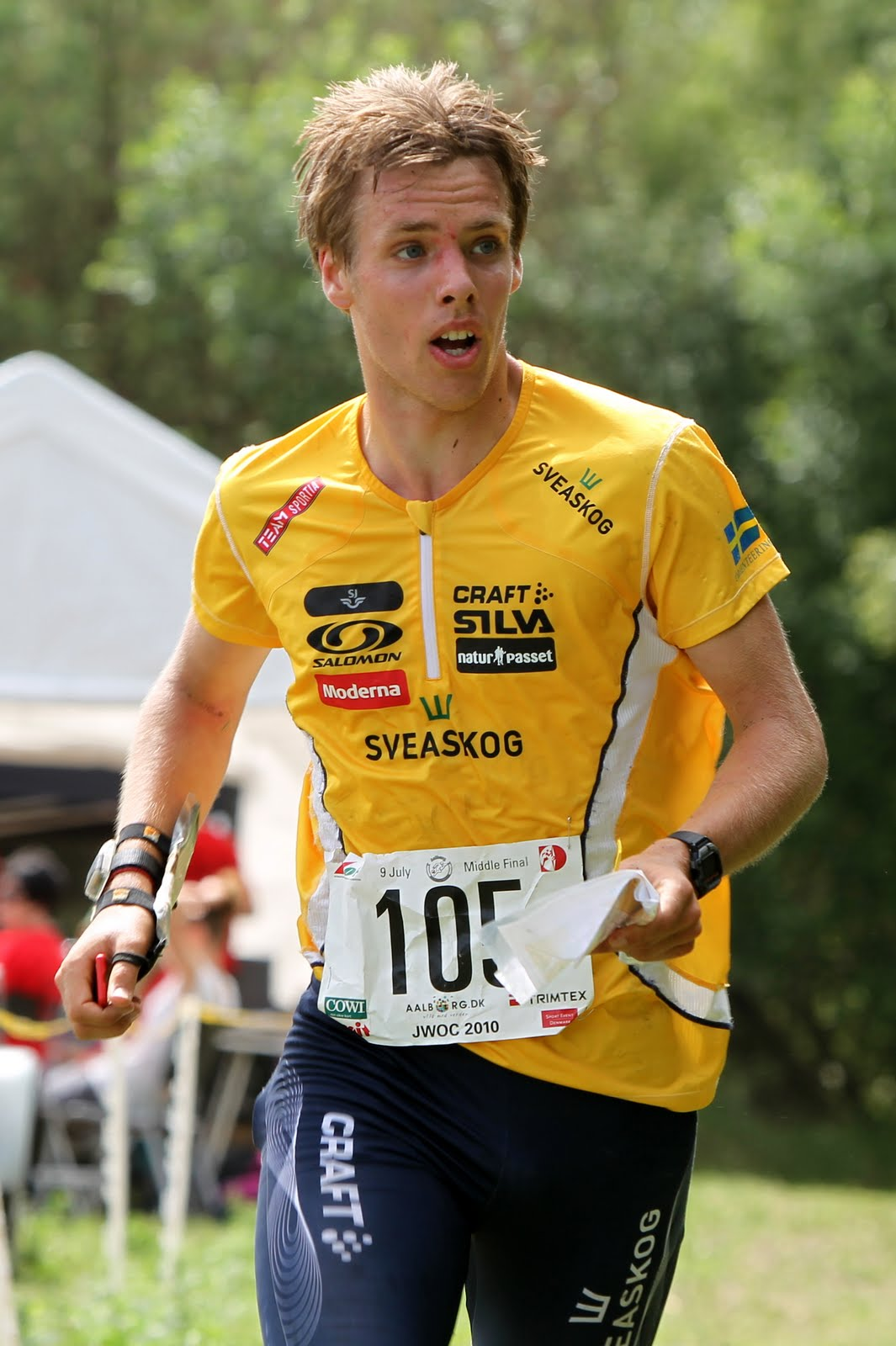
- Runesson at JWOC 2010

Medal record

Men's orienteering

Representing Sweden

World Championships
Gold medal – first place	2019 Østfold	Relay
Bronze medal – third place	2017 Tartu	Relay

Junior World Championships
Gold medal – first place	2008 Göteborg	Middle
Gold medal – first place	2008 Göteborg	Long
Gold medal – first place	2008 Göteborg	Relay
Silver medal – second place	2008 Göteborg	Sprint
Silver medal – second place	2010 Aalborg	Long
Silver medal – second place	2010 Aalborg	Relay

Johan Runesson (born 20 November 1990) is a Swedish orienteering competitor and World and Junior World Champion.

Runesson competed at the 2008 Junior World Orienteering Championships in Gothenburg, where he won a gold medal in the middle distance, a silver medal in the sprint, and a gold medal in the long distance, as well as participating on the winning Swedish relay team.

He competed at the 2012 World Orienteering Championships. In the middle distance he qualified for the final, where he placed 18th. At the 2019 World Orienteering Championships he participated in the winning Swedish relay team.

Since June 2011, he lives in Gothenburg. Before he lived in Örebro.
