= Štěpán Kodeda =

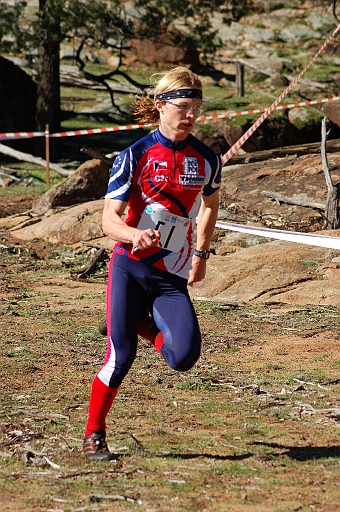
- Stepan Kodeda at JWOC 2007

Personal information
- Born: 5 February 1988 Plzeň, Czechoslovakia
- Died: 30 March 2015 (aged 27) Prague, Czech Republic
Medal record
Men's orienteering
Representing Czech Republic
Junior World Championships
Gold medal – first place	2007 Dubbo	Relay
Gold medal – first place	2008 Göteborg	Sprint

Štěpán Kodeda (5 February 1988 – 30 March 2015) was a Czech orienteering competitor, and twice junior world champion.

== Career ==
Štěpán was a runner of the Swedish club IFK Mora in Dalarna from 2005 until 2010, when he changed to the Finnish club MS Parma. He achieved many good team results as the 7th place in Tiomila's Relay 2008, where he ran the first for Dalarna's team exchanging 6th among 347 runners. Starting in 2006 he also ran for Sportcentrum Jičín in the Czech Republic and since 2009 for Club Esportiu Farra-O in Spain.

In 2007, he became Junior World Champion in relay in Dubbo, Australia together with Jan Benes and Adam Chromy. In 2008, he won a gold medal in sprint distance at the Junior World Championships in Gothenburg, Sweden.

His best results at the World Orienteering Championships were an 18th place in the 2011 sprint final in Savoie, France, and an 18th place in the 2013 long distance in Vuokatti, Finland.

== Death ==
Kodeda died on 30 March 2015 in Prague, after having been seriously injured in a traffic accident.

== See also ==
- Czech orienteers
- List of orienteers
- List of orienteering events
