= Anders Skarholt =

Norwegian orienteer

Medal record

Men's orienteering

Representing Norway

Junior World Championships
Gold medal – first place	2006 Druskininkai	Long distance
Bronze medal – third place	2006 Druskininkai	Relay

Anders Skarholt (born 1986) is a Norwegian orienteering competitor and Junior World Orienteering Champion.

== Junior career ==
Born in 1986, Anders Skarholt competed at the 2006 Junior World Orienteering Championships in Druskininkai, where he received a gold medal in the long distance.

He participated on the Norwegian team in the relay event, together with Erik Sagvolden and Olav Lundanes, and received a bronze medal. Skarholt was running the first leg and developed a heart flutter, and finished his leg two and a half minutes behind the lead.
