= Junior World Orienteering Championships =

International orienteering event

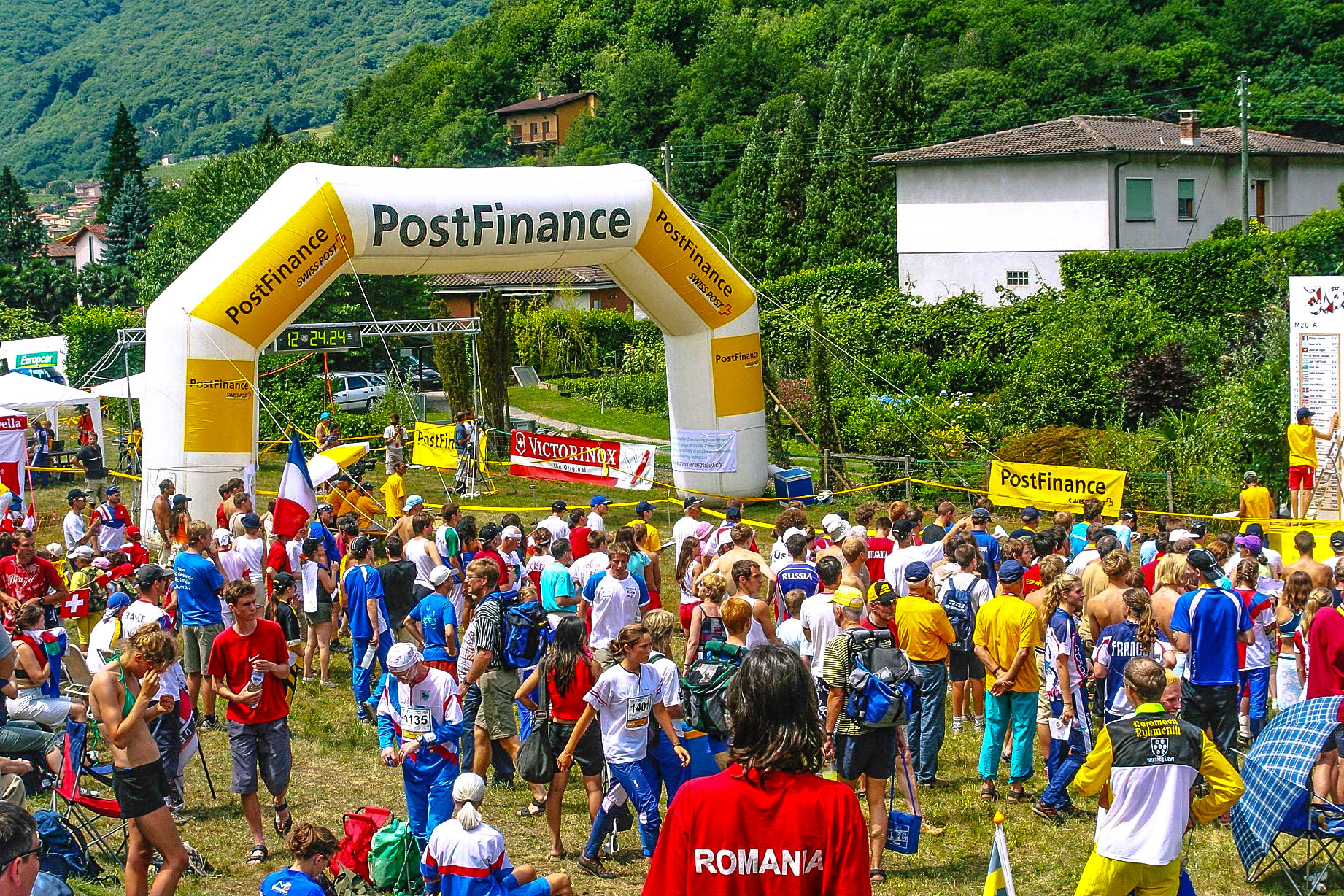
- Finish chute at JWOC 2005 in Switzerland
- Status: active
- Genre: sports event
- Date: June–July
- Frequency: Annual
- Location: various
- Country: various
- Inaugurated: 1990
- Previous event: 2025
- Next event: 2026
- Organiser: IOF
- Website: https://www.jwoc2024.cz

The Junior World Orienteering Championships (JWOC) are an annual orienteering competition. They were first held in 1990. Entry is open to national teams aged 20 and below as of 31 December in the year of competition. Representative countries must be members of the International Orienteering Federation (IOF).

== History ==
An international junior match was arranged first time in 1983 in Ry, Denmark, and then in 1984 (Hartberg, Austria) and 1985 (Font-Romeau, France). From 1986 (in Pécs, Hungary) the events became the unofficial Junior European Championships, and were held the following years, 1987 (Ambleside, England), 1988 (Eupen, Belgium) and 1989 (Seefeld/Kufstein, Austria). From 1990 (Älvsbyn, Sweden), the competition became official Junior World Orienteering Championships.

== Current program ==
Current program (from 2024) includes:

- Individual Sprint Event
- Sprint Relay
- Individual Middle Distance Event
- Individual Long Distance Event
- Team Relay

Originally JWOC started with an Individual (Classic) competition followed by a relay. The Short Distance Championships were added in 1991, which remained until 2004 where the Short Distance became the Middle Distance, falling into line with the World Orienteering Championships. An unofficial Sprint Race was held in Switzerland in 2005 in conjunction with the PostFinance-Sprint ****PostFinance Sprint****. Shortly following this event the Sprint discipline was added to the program for Lithuania 2006. From 2022 onward the Middle Distance Qualification has been replaced by the Sprint relay discipline with four runners in each team. Two women (1st & 4th leg) and two men (2nd &3rd leg).

== Host towns/cities ==
Year	Date	Location
1990	7–12 July	Älvsbyn, Sweden
1991	7–13 July	Berlin, Germany
1992	7–13 July	Jyväskylä, Finland
1993	7–10 July	Kastelruth, Italy
1994	12–16 July	Gdynia, Poland
1995	9–12 July	Horsens, Denmark
1996	8–14 July	Băile Govora, Romania
1997	7–13 July	Leopoldsburg, Belgium
1998	13–18 July	Reims, France
1999	5–11 July	Varna, Bulgaria
2000	9–15 July	Nové Město na Moravě, Czech Republic
2001	9–15 July	Miskolc, Hungary
2002	7–14 July	Alicante, Spain
2003	7–12 July	Põlva, Estonia
2004	5–11 July	Gdańsk, Poland
2005	11–16 July	Tenero, Switzerland
2006	2–7 July	Druskininkai, Lithuania
2007	7–15 July	Dubbo, Australia
2008	30 June–6 July	Gothenburg, Sweden
2009	6–11 July	Primiero, Italy
2010	4–10 July	Aalborg, Denmark
2011	3–8 July	Wejherowo, Poland
2012	8–13 July	Košice, Slovakia
2013	30 June–6 July	Hradec Králové, Czech Republic
2014	22–27 July	Borovets, Bulgaria
2015	4–10 July	Rauland, Norway
2016	10–18 July	Engadin, Switzerland
2017	9–16 July	Tampere, Finland
2018	8–15 July	Kecskemét, Hungary
2019	6–12 July	Silkeborg, Denmark
~~2020~~	Cancelled due to the COVID-19 pandemic	
2021	5–10 September	Kocaeli, Turkey
2022	11–16 July	Aguiar da Beira, Portugal
2023	2–9 July	Baia Mare, Romania
2024	30 June–6 July	Plzeň, Czech Republic
2025	26 June-4 July	Trentino-Alto Adige, Italy
2026	29 June–4 July	Karlskrona, Sweden
2027	11—17 July	Polanica-Zdrój, Poland
2028	9—14 July	Tampere, Finland
2029	TBA	Christchurch, New Zealand

== Individual/Classic/Long ==
This event was called "Classic distance" from 1991 to 2003, and since 2004 it is called "Long distance".

=== Men ===
Year	Gold	Silver	Bronze	Notes
1990	(Finland) Mikael Boström	(Sweden) Jimmy Birklin	(Finland) Sören Nymalm	
1991	(Soviet Union) Ivars Zagars	(Czechoslovakia) Tomas Dolezal	(Finland) Mikko Lepo	
1992	(Sweden) Johan Näsman	(Denmark) Chris Terkelsen	(Sweden) Fredrik Löwegren	
1993	(Norway) Odin Tellesbø	(Denmark) Torben Nørgård	(Finland) Tommi Tölkkö	
1994	(Poland) Robert Banach	(Poland) Janusz Gliszczyński	(Finland) Tommi Tölkkö	
1995	(Hungary) Gabor Domonyik	(Russia) Michael Mamleev	(Finland) Jani Lakanen	
1996	(Romania) Maricel Olaru	(Sweden) Anders Axenborg	(Finland) Jani Lakanen	
1997	(Sweden) Johan Modig	(Czech Republic) Vladimír Lučan	(Slovakia) Marián Dávidík	
1998	(Sweden) Håkan Pettersson	(France) Thierry Gueorgiou	(Norway) Jørgen Rostrup	
1999	(Russia) Andrey Khramov	(Finland) Mikko Heikelä	(Australia) Troy de Haas	
2000	(Czech Republic) Jiří Kazda	(Finland) Pasi Ikonen	(Czech Republic) Jaromír Švihovský	
2001	(Russia) Andrey Khramov	(Finland) Mårten Boström	(Czech Republic) Michal Smola	
2002	(Switzerland) Daniel Hubmann	(Poland) Wojciech Kowalski	(Russia) Alexei Bortnik	
2003	(Russia) Dmitry Tsvetkov	(Switzerland) Matthias Merz	(Switzerland) Daniel Hubmann	
2004	(Switzerland) Matthias Merz	(Sweden) Martin Johansson	(Lithuania) Simonas Krepsta	
2005	(Norway) Olav Lundanes	(Switzerland) Andreas Ruedlinger	(France) Philippe Adamski	
2006	(Norway) Anders Skarholt	(Norway) Olav Lundanes	(Estonia) Markus Puusepp	12.6 km, 22 controls
2007	(Norway) Olav Lundanes	(Norway) Magne Dæhli	(Denmark) Christian Bobach	11.1 km, 27 controls
2008	(Sweden) Johan Runesson	(Estonia) Timo Sild	(Switzerland) Matthias Kyburz	10.2 km, 21 controls
2009	(Sweden) Gustav Bergman	(Denmark) Søren Bobach	(Switzerland) Martin Hubmann	9.5 km, 29 controls
2010	(Czech Republic) Pavel Kubát	(Sweden) Johan Runesson	(Switzerland) Matthias Kyburz	11.3 km, 31 controls
2011	(Norway) Yngve Skogstad	(Austria) Robert Merl	(France) Lucas Basset	11.1 km, 23 controls
2012	(Norway) Eskil Kinneberg	(Denmark) Marius Thrane Ødum	(Russia) Gleb Tikhonov	11.5 km, 23 controls
2013	(Poland) Piotr Parfianowicz	(Switzerland) Florian Schneider	(Russia) Andrey Kozyrev	9.9 km, 21 controls
2014	(Sweden) Anton Johansson	(Sweden) Assar Hellström	(Czech Republic) Marek Minář	10.2 km, 23 controls
2015	(Finland) Olli Ojanaho	(Sweden) Simon Hector	(Norway) Andreas Soelberg	10.7 km, 24 controls
2016	(Switzerland) Joey Hadorn	(Switzerland) Thomas Curiger	(Sweden) Isac von Krusenstierna	8.8 km, 21 controls
2017	(Finland) Olli Ojanaho	(Sweden) Simon Imark	(Sweden) Simon Hector	10.7 km, 21 controls
2018	(Norway) Kasper Fosser	(France) Mathieu Perrin	(Czech Republic) Daniel Vandas	15.0 km, 29 controls
2019	(Norway) Kasper Fosser	(Norway) Elias Jonsson	(Australia) Aston Key	10.1 km, 24 controls
2021	(France) Basile Basset	(Denmark) Soren Thrane Odum	(Hungary) Ferenc Jonas	11.1 km, 24 controls
2022	(Sweden) Noel Braun	(Norway) Kornelius Kriszat Lovfald	(Finland) Touko Seppa	10.8 km, 24 controls
2023	(Czech Republic) Jakub Chaloupsky	(Sweden) Noel Braun	(Switzerland) Pascal Schaerer	10,7 km, 23 controls
2024	(Switzerland) Matthieu Buehrer	(New Zealand) Zefa Faavae	(Czech Republic) Daniel Bolehovsky	11,5 km, 19 controls
2025	(Czech Republic) Daniel Bolehovsky	(Sweden) Wilmer Selin	(Spain) Alejandro Garrido Díaz	11,5 km, 19 controls
2026	(Switzerland) Matthieu Buehrer	(Czech Republic) Vladimir Srb	(Hungary) Marton Csoboth	12,56 km, 23 controls

=== Women ===
Year	Gold	Silver	Bronze	Notes
1990	(Norway) Torunn Fossli	(Sweden) Marlena Jansson	(Finland) Mari Lukkarinen	
1991	(Finland) Mari Lukkarinen	(Czech Republic) Marcela Kubátková	(Sweden) Katarina Allberg	
1992	(Poland) Barbara Bączek	(Finland) Johanna Tiira	(Norway) Hanne Staff	
1993	(Finland) Liisa Anttila	(Denmark) Tenna Nörgård	(Czech Republic) Hana Doleželová	
1994	(Denmark) Christina Grøndahl	(Sweden) Pia Olsson	(Poland) Ewa Kozłowska	
1995	(Denmark) Christina Grøndahl	(Czech Republic) Lenka Čechová	(Czech Republic) Kateřina Mikšová	
1996	(Romania) Enikö Fey	(Czech Republic) Kateřina Pracná	(Germany) Karin Schmalfeld	
1997	(Switzerland) Simone Luder	(Finland) Hanna Heiskanen	(Switzerland) Regula Hulliger	
1998	(Finland) Hanna Heiskanen	(Russia) Tatiana Pereliaeva	(Czech Republic) Eva Juřeníková	
1999	(Switzerland) Regula Hulliger	(Russia) Tatiana Pereliaeva	(Hungary) Katalin Hecz	
2000	(Russia) Tatiana Pereliaeva	(Norway) Marianne Riddervold	(Ukraine) Nataliya Potopalska	
2001	(Czech Republic) Dana Brožková	(Finland) Pinja Satri	(Russia) Daria Smolik	
2002	(Finland) Tiina Kivimäki	(Czech Republic) Michaela Przyczková	(Finland) Minna Kauppi	
2003	(Czech Republic) Martina Dočkalová	(Finland) Anni-Maija Fincke	(Sweden) Helena Jansson	
2004	(Finland) Silja Tarvonen	(Switzerland) Seline Stadler	(United Kingdom) Allison O'Neill	
2005	(Norway) Mari Fasting	(Norway) Elise Egseth	(Finland) Paula Iso-Markku	
2006	(Australia) Hanny Allston	(Norway) Betty Ann Bjerkreim Nilsen	(Sweden) Elin A Skantze	8.8 km, 16 controls
2007	(Norway) Siri Ulvestad	(Norway) Kine Hallan Steiwer	(Finland) Heini Saarimäki	7.2 km, 16 controls
2008	(Sweden) Jenny Lönnkvist	(Sweden) Beata Falk	(Norway) Siri Ulvestad	6.7 km, 15 controls
2009	(Denmark) Ida Bobach	(Sweden) Jenny Lönnkvist	(Finland) Teini Marika	5.7 km, 18 controls
2010	(Denmark) Ida Bobach	(Sweden) Therese Klintberg	(Finland) Sari Anttonen	7.3 km, 22 controls
2011	(Denmark) Ida Bobach	(Denmark) Emma Klingenberg	(Sweden) Tove Alexandersson	7.7 km, 20 controls
2012	(Finland) Kirsi Nurmi	(Sweden) Frida Sandberg	(Canada) Emily Kemp	7.7 km, 13 controls
2013	(Sweden) Lisa Risby	(Sweden) Sara Hagström	(Russia) Ekaterina Savkina	7.1 km, 15 controls
2014	(Norway) Gunvor Hov Høydal	(Sweden) Sara Hagstrom	(Finland) Emmi Jokela	7.2 km, 16 controls
2015	(Sweden) Sara Hagstrom	(Finland) Anna Haataja	(Switzerland) Sandrine Mueller	7.3 km, 16 controls
2016	(Finland) Anna Haataja	(Switzerland) Valerie Aebischer	(Switzerland) Sofie Bachmann	6.5 km, 16 controls
2017	(Switzerland) Simona Aebersold	(Finland) Veera Klemettinen	(Switzerland) Sofie Bachmann	7.6 km, 16 controls
2018	(Switzerland) Simona Aebersold	(Hungary) Zsofia Sarkozy	(Czech Republic) Tereza Janošíková	10.2 km, 18 controls
2019	(Finland) Ida Haapala (Russia) Veronika Kalinina		(United Kingdom) Grace Molloy	6.5 km, 18 controls
2021	(Switzerland) Lilly Graber	(Czech Republic) Lucie Semíková	(Hungary) Viktoria Mag	7.0 km, 18 controls
2022	(Sweden) Hanna Lundberg	(Finland) Eeva Liina Ojanaho	(Norway) Oda Scheele	7.3 km, 20 controls
2023	(Czech Republic) Lucie Dittrichova	(Switzerland) Henriette Radzikowski	(Norway) Pia Young Vik	7,8 km, 17 controls
2024	(Czech Republic) Lucie Dittrichova	(Czech Republic) Michaela Novotna	(Czech Republic) Viktorie Skachova	9,6 km, 16 controls
2025	(Sweden) Freja Hjerne	(Switzerland) Henriette Radzikowski	(Hungary) Rita Máramarosi	9,6 km, 16 controls
2026	(Sweden) Freja Hjerne	(Hungary) Janka Mikes	(France) Fanny Delahaye	9,88 km, 19 controls

== Short/Middle distance ==
This event was called "Short distance" from 1991 to 2003. Since 2004 it is called "Middle distance".

=== Men ===
Year	Gold	Silver	Bronze	Notes
1991	(Poland) Janusz Porzycz	(Finland) Mikko Lepo	(Sweden) Stefan Sandahl	6.02 km, 14 cp, 48 participants
1992	(Finland) Mikko Lepo	(Norway) Bernt Bjørnsgaard	(Sweden) Joakim Carlson	3.6 km, 10 controls
1993	(Czech Republic) Václav Zakouřil	(Norway) Bernt Bjørnsgaard	(Finland) Miko Lepo	
1994	(Sweden) Jon Engkvist	(Norway) Holger Hott Johansen	(Finland) Tommi Toikko	5.2 km, 12 controls
1995	(Hungary) Domonyik Gábor	(Czech Republic) Tomáš Zakouřil	(Russia) Michael Mamleev	4.675 km, 11 cp, 142 participants
1996	(Hungary) Domonyik Gábor	(Sweden) Johan Modig	(Romania) Horatio Grecu	
1997	(Norway) Jørgen Rostrup	(Sweden) Rikard Gunnarsson	(Sweden) Per Oberg	5.0 km, 18 cp, 60 participants
1998	(Norway) Jørgen Rostrup	(Sweden) Rikard Gunnarsson	(Sweden) H. Peterson	
1999	(Finland) Jonne Lakanen	(Russia) Sergey Detkov	(France) Thierry Gueorgiou	4.8 km, 14 controls
2000	(Czech Republic) Michal Smola	(Czech Republic) Zbyněk Hora	(Czech Republic) Jaromír Švihovský	
2001	(Norway) Marius Bjugan	(Sweden) Jan Troeng	(Czech Republic) Michal Smola	4.808 km, 13 controls
2002	(Sweden) Erik Andersson	(Finland) Tuomas Tervo	(Finland) Jörgen Wickholm	4.65 km, 14 controls
2003	(Switzerland) Matthias Merz	(Finland) Tuomas Tervo	(Russia) Aleksei Bortnik	3.6 km, 11 controls
2004	(Norway) Audun Bjerkreim Nilsen	(Switzerland) Matthias Merz	(Lithuania) Simonas Krepsta	4.61 km, 14 controls
2005	(Switzerland) Fabian Hertner	(France) Philippe Adamski	(Finland) Hannu Airila	3.5 km, 17 controls
2006	(Czech Republic) Jan Beneš (Denmark) Søren Bobach		(Norway) Olav Lundanes	4.4 km
2007	(Norway) Olav Lundanes	(Sweden) Petter Eriksson	(Switzerland) Martin Hubmann	4.5 km, 22 controls
2008	(Sweden) Johan Runesson	(Norway) Ulf Forseth Indgaard	(Denmark) Sören Bobach	4.1 km, 16 controls
2009	(Finland) Olli-Markus Taivainen	(Switzerland) Philipp Sauter	(Norway) Ulf Forseth Indgaard	4.1 km, 19 controls
2010	(Norway) Gaute Hallan Steiwer	(Sweden) Jonas Leandersson	(Sweden) Olle Boström	4.7 km, 23 controls
2011	(Finland) Topias Tiainen (Austria) Robert Merl (Russia) Dmitry Nakonechnyy			4.2 km, 17 controls
2012	(New Zealand) Matt Ogden	(Czech Republic) Jan Petržela	(Switzerland) Florian Schneider	4.8 km, 19 controls
2013	(Sweden) Emil Svensk	(Sweden) Anton Johansson	(Sweden) Jens Wängdahl	3.6 km, 17 controls
2014	(Finland) Miika Kirmula	(Italy) Riccardo Scalet	(Finland) Olli Ojanaho	3.8 km, 16 controls
2015	(Finland) Olli Ojanaho	(Sweden) Erik Andersson	(Switzerland) Sven Hellmuller	4.2 km, 19 controls
2016	(Switzerland) Thomas Curiger	(Switzerland) Joey Hadorn	(Norway) Audun Heimdal	3.8 km, 17 controls
2017	(Finland) Olli Ojanaho	(Norway) Audun Heimdal	(Sweden) Simon Imark	4.1 km, 18 controls
2018	(Sweden) Jesper Svensk	(Sweden) Simon Imark	(Sweden) Henrik Johannesson	4.5 km, 17 controls
2019	(Norway) Kasper Fosser	(France) Guilhem Elias	(Norway) Lukas Liland	4.7 km, 17 controls
2021	(Sweden) Axel Elmblad	(Sweden) Viktor Svensk	(Hungary) Ferenc Jonas	4.2 km, 16 controls
2022	(Hungary) Zoltan Bujdoso	(Sweden) Edvin Nilsson	(Finland) Touko Seppa	4.0 km, 16 controls
2023	(Sweden) Hannes Mogensen	(Czech Republic) Jakub Chaloupsky	(Denmark) Oscar David Brom Jensen	4,8 km, 18 controls
2024	(Czech Republic) Jan Strycek	(Switzerland) Matthieu Buehrer	(Norway) Alfred Bjoerneroed	4,8 km, 19 controls
2025	(Hungary) Márton Csoboth	(Switzerland) Loïc Berger	(Finland) Rasmus Töyrylä	
2026	(Norway) Sondre Olaussen	(Sweden) Ludwig Rosen	(Sweden) Edvin Johansson Liljegren	4,5 km, 18 controls

=== Women ===
Year	Gold	Silver	Bronze	Notes
1991	(Germany) Kristin Liebich	(Finland) Johanna Tiira	(Sweden) Karolina Arewång	4.43 km, 11 controls 48 participants
1992	(Poland) Barbara Bączek	(Finland) Riita Korpela	(Norway) Elisabeth Ingvaldsen	2.8 km, 8 controls 49 participants
1993	(Denmark) Tenna Norgaard	(Finland) Satu Mäkitammi	(Finland) Liisa Anttila	3.35 km, 12 controls
1994	(Norway) Synne Lea	(Sweden) Pia Olsson	(Finland) Terhi Hyttinen	3.9 km, 9 controls
1995	(Denmark) Christina Gröndahl	(Germany) Karin Schmalfeld	(Czech Republic) Iva Navrátilová	3.52 km, 10 controls, 101 participants
1996	(Romania) Enikõ Fey	(Sweden) Annika Björk	(Russia) Julia Morozova	3.79 km, 9 controls, 113 participants
1997	(Finland) Hanna Heiskanen	(Czech Republic) Kateřina Mikšová	(Finland) Heli Jukkola	4.2 km, 14 controls
1998	(Russia) Tatiana Pereliaeva	(Switzerland) Astrid Fritschi	(Finland) Hanna Heiskanen	
1999	(Switzerland) Regula Hulliger	(Finland) Salla Sukki	(Finland) Johanna Seppinen	3.95 km, 14 controls
2000	(Sweden) Camilla Berglund	(Sweden) Maria Bergkvist	(Finland) Minna Kauppi	
2001	(Finland) Minna Kauppi	(Lithuania) Ieva Sargautyte	(Sweden) Kajsa Nilsson	3.903 km, 11 controls
2002	(Finland) Minna Kauppi	(Lithuania) Indre Valaite	(Switzerland) Martina Fritschy	3.8 km, 13 controls
2003	(Finland) Laura Hokka	(Denmark) Signe Søes	(Estonia) Eveli Saue	3.7 km, 12 controls
2004	(Sweden) Helena Jansson	(Czech Republic) Radka Brožková	(Finland) Anni-Maija Fincke	4.13 km, 12 controls
2005	(Sweden) Anna Persson	(Finland) Heini Wennman	(Australia) Hanny Allston	3.0 km, 14 controls
2006	(Norway) Betty Ann Bjerkreim Nilsen	(Finland) Ulrika Uotila	(Denmark) Signe Klinting	3.6 km, 14 controls
2007	(Sweden) Jenny Lönnkvist	(Norway) Ida Marie Bjørgul	(Russia) Tatyana Mendel (Finland) Saila Kinni	3.6 km, 21 controls
2008	(Finland) Venla Niemi	(Sweden) Beata Falk	(France) Karine D`Harreville	3.0 km, 12 controls
2009	(Sweden) Tove Alexandersson	(Norway) Britt Ingunn Nydal	(Denmark) Ida Bobach	3.1 km, 15 controls
2010	(Sweden) Tove Alexandersson	(Sweden) Lilian Forsgren	(Switzerland) Sarina Jenzer	3.9 km, 20 controls
2011	(Denmark) Ida Bobach	(Sweden) Tove Alexandersson	(Denmark) Emma Klingenberg	3.5 km, 14 controls
2012	(Sweden) Tove Alexandersson	(Sweden) Frida Sandberg	(Switzerland) Sandrine Müller	3,6 km, 17 controls
2013	(Denmark) Miri Thrane Ödum	(Sweden) Lisa Risby	(Norway) Mathilde Rundhaug	3.0 km, 14 controls
2014	(Switzerland) Sina Tommer (Sweden) Sara Hagstrom		(Sweden) Andrea Svensson	3,1 km, 15 controls
2015	(Norway) Anine Ahlsand	(Sweden) Johanna Oberg	(Switzerland) Sandrine Mueller	3.6 km, 18 controls
2016	(Switzerland) Simona Aebersold	(Poland) Aleksandra Hornik	(Sweden) Johanna Oberg	3.1 km, 17 controls
2017	(Switzerland) Simona Aebersold	(Sweden) Linnea Golsäter	(Finland) Veera Klemettinen	3.5 km, 16 controls
2018	(Hungary) Csilla Gardonyi	(Sweden) Sanna Fast	(Czech Republic) Barbora Chaloupská	3.6 km, 14 controls
2019	(Sweden) Isa Envall	(United Kingdom) Fiona Bunn	(Czech Republic) Tereza Janošíková	4.3 km, 14 controls
2021	(Sweden) Hanna Lundberg	(Switzerland) Lilly Graber	(Sweden) Tilda Ostberg	3.5 km, 15 controls
2022	(Sweden) Hanna Lundberg	(Sweden) Elsa Sonesson	(Finland) Eeva Liina Ojanaho	3.5 km, 14 controls
2023	(Switzerland) Henriette Radzikowski	(Czech Republic) Lucie Dittrichova	(Norway) Pia Young Vik	4,7 km, 14 controls
2024	(Czech Republic) Lucie Dittrichova	(Czech Republic) Viktorie Skachova	(Sweden) Alma Svennerud	3,8 km, 14 controls
2025	(Czech Republic) Viktorie Škáchová	(Hungary) Rita Máramarosi	(Czech Republic) Lucie Dittrichová	
2026	(Sweden) Felicia Persson	(Hungary) Janka Mikes	(Finland) Anni Jantunen	3,74 km, 16 controls

== Sprint ==
This event was first held in 2006.

=== Men ===
Year	Gold	Silver	Bronze	Notes
2006	(Sweden) Mikael Kristensson	(Sweden) Patrik Karlsson	(Ukraine) Ruslan Glebov	3.2 km, 16 controls
2007	(Czech Republic) Vojtěch Král	(Norway) Olav Lundanes	(Bulgaria) Ivan Sirakov	3.3 km, 18 controls
2008	(Czech Republic) Stepan Kodeda	(Sweden) Johan Runesson	(Denmark) Sören Bobach	2.8 km, 16 controls
2009	(Switzerland) Matthias Kyburz	(Czech Republic) Miloš Nykodým	(Switzerland) Martin Hubmann	3.1 km, 24 controls
2010	(Denmark) Rasmus Thrane Hansen	(United Kingdom) Kristian Jones	(Norway) Vegard Danielsen	2.7 km, 22 controls
2011	(France) Lucas Basset	(Spain) Andreu Blanes	(Switzerland) Florian Howald	2.9 km, 23 controls
2012	(Russia) Gleb Tikhonov	(Czech Republic) Jan Petržela	(Norway) Eskil Kinneberg	2,9 km, 20 controls
2013	(Switzerland) Florian Schneider	(Czech Republic) Michal Hubáček	(New Zealand) Tim Robertson	2.4 km, 21 controls
2014	(New Zealand) Tim Robertson	(Poland) Piotr Parfianowicz	(Sweden) Anton Johansson	3.0 km, 20 controls
2015	(New Zealand) Tim Robertson	(Finland) Aleksi Niemi	(Lithuania) Algirdas Bartkevičius	2,9 km, 17 controls
2016	(Switzerland) Joey Hadorn	(Switzerland) Thomas Curiger	(Sweden) Isac von Krusenstierna	3.7 km, 19 controls
2017	(Finland) Olli Ojanaho	(New Zealand) Tommy Hayes	(Switzerland) Joey Hadorn	3.5 km, 23 controls
2018	(Germany) Colin Kolbe	(United Kingdom) Matthew Fellbaum	(Norway) Kasper Fosser (Finland) Otto Kaario	4.1 km, 24 controls
2019	(Australia) Aston Key	(Sweden) Samuel Pihlstrom	(France) Guilhem Elias	3.3 km, 23 controls
2021	(Italy) Francesco Mariani	(Finland) Touko Seppa	(Sweden) Axel Elmblad	3.5 km, 15 controls
2022	(Sweden) Axel Elmblad	(Norway) Tobias Alstad	(Norway) Mikkel Holt (Italy) Ilian Angeli (France) Basile Basset	3.3 km, 15 controls
2023	(Germany) Anselm Reichenbach	(France) Guilhem Verove	(Estonia) Jurgen Joonas	4,3 km, 28 controls
2024	(Switzerland) Matthieu Buehrer	(Norway) Iver Dalsaune Thun	(Switzerland) Loic Berger	3,6 km, 17 controls
2025	(Norway) Jonas Fenne Ingierd	(Poland) Tomasz Rzeńca| (Czech Republic) Daniel Bolehovský	No medalist	3,6 km, 17 controls
2026	(Switzerland) Matthieu Buehrer	(Australia) Elye Dent (Australia) Cooper Horley	No medalist	3,95 km, 21 controls

=== Women ===
Year	Gold	Silver	Bronze	Notes
2006	(Norway) Ingunn Hultgreen Weltzien	(Australia) Hanny Allston	(Sweden) Eva Svensson	2.5 km, 13 controls 121 participants
2007	(Sweden) Eva Svensson	(Czech Republic) Šárka Svobodná	(Denmark) Maja Alm	2.7 km, 17 controls
2008	(Denmark) Emma Klingenberg	(Norway) Silje Ekroll Jahren	(Sweden) Jenny Lönnkvist	2.6 km, 13 controls
2009	(Sweden) Jenny Lönnkvist	(Denmark) Ida Bobach	(Czech Republic) Tereza Novotná	2.5 km, 21 controls
2010	(Denmark) Ida Bobach	(Poland) Hanna Wiśniewska	(Poland) Monika Gajda	2.3 km, 19 controls
2011	(Denmark) Ida Bobach	(Denmark) Emma Klingenberg	(Czech Republic) Tereza Novotná	2.5 km, 22 controls
2012	(Sweden) Tove Alexandersson	(Denmark) Emma Klingenberg	(Sweden) Frida Sandberg	2.3 km, 17 controls
2013	(Norway) Heidi Mårtensson	(Denmark) Nicoline Friberg Klysner	(Belarus) Anastasia Denisova	2.1 km, 19 controls
2014	(Sweden) Sara Hagstrom	(Norway) Heidi Mårtensson	(Denmark) Miri Thrane Ødum	2.5 km, 17 controls
2015	(Switzerland) Simona Aebersold	(Norway) Heidi Mårtensson	(Finland) Karoliina Ukskoski	2.4 km, 13 controls
2016	(Switzerland) Simona Aebersold	(Russia) Anna Dvorianskaia	(Finland) Anna Haataja	3.3 km, 16 controls
2017	(Switzerland) Simona Aebersold	(Czech Republic) Tereza Janošíková	(Sweden) Linnea Golsater	3.0 km, 21 controls
2018	(Switzerland) Simona Aebersold	(Czech Republic) Tereza Janošíková	(Hungary) Csilla Gardonyi	3.7 km, 21 controls
2019	(Switzerland) Eline Gemperle	(Sweden) Tilda Ostberg	(United Kingdom) Grace Molloy	2.9 km, 17 controls
2021	(Denmark) Malin Agervig Kristiansson	(Sweden) Hanna Lundberg	(France) Cecile Calandry	3.0 km, 13 controls
2022	(Finland) Elisa Mattila	(Switzerland) Lilly Graber	(Czech Republic) Anna Karlová	3.0 km, 13 controls
2023	(Hungary) Rita Maramarosi	(Norway) Pia Young Vik	(Finland) Eeva Liina Ojanaho	3,8 km, 23 controls
2024	(Finland) Elli Punto (Czech Republic) Michaela Novotna		(Switzerland) Henriette Radzikowski	3,2 km, 17 controls
2025	(Switzerland) Seline Sannwald	(Switzerland) Kati Hotz	(Czech Republic) Lucie Dittrichová	
2026	(Sweden) Freja Hjerne	(Switzerland) Leonie Mathis	(Croatia) Sara Delic	3,43 km, 20 controls

== Sprint Relay ==
Year	Gold	Silver	Bronze	Notes
2022	Norway; Oda Scheele; Mikkel Holt; Tobias Alstad; Pia Young Vik	Hungary; Boglarka Czako; Peter Nagy; Zoltan Bujdoso; Rita Maramarosi	Czech Republic; Anna Karlová; Jakub Chaloupský; Daniel Bolehovský; Markéta Muličková	
2023	Hungary; Viktoria Mag; Tamas Felfoldi; Marton Csoboth; Rita Maramarosi	Norway; Kristin Melby Jacobsen; Iver Dalsaune Thun; Brage Takle; Pia Young Vik	Finland; Salla Isoherranen; Sampo Sankelo; Aarni Ronkainen; Eeva Liina Ojanaho	
2024	Norway; Ingeborg Roll Mosland; Philip Lehmann Romoren; Alfred Bjoerneroed; Mathea Gloeersen	Switzerland; Rachel Marxer; Elia Gartmann; Loic Berger; Seline Sannwald	Sweden; Klara Borg; Linus Wernstrom; Ludwig Rosen; Alma Svennerud	
2025	Czechia; Hana Vitkova; Daniel Bolehovsky; Tomas Urbanek; Lucie Dittrichova	Sweden; Freja Hjerne; Hannes Mogensen; Max Oesterberg; Alva Bjork	Hungary; Janka Mikes; Mihaly Csoboth; Marton Csoboth; Rita Maramarosi	
2026	Switzerland; Henriette Radzikowski; Loic Berger; Matthieu Buehrerk; Leonie Mathis	France; Lucie Gaudion; Simon Calandry; Nathan Philibert; Fanny Delahaye	Czech Republic; Marketa Hanusova; Vladimir Srb; Tomas Urbanek; Katerina Stepova	

== Relay ==
=== Men ===
Year	Gold	Silver	Bronze	Notes
1990	Finland; Mikael Boström; Sören Nymalm; Kimmo Liljeström	Sweden; Mikael Palmberg; Klas Karlsson; Jimmy Birklin	Norway; Tore Sandvik; Espen Bergstrøm; Harald Bakke	
1991	Sweden; Fredrik Löwegren; Magnus Palmberg; Andreas Nilsson	(Soviet Union) USSR; Girts Vegeris; Janis Ozolins; Ivars Zagars	Czechoslovakia; Aleš Drahoňovský; Tomáš Doležal; Libor Zřídkaveselý	
1992	Finland; Aarto Hirvi; Marko Pitkänen; Mikko Lepo	Norway; Knut Aalde; Stein Krogstad; Thormod Berg	Sweden; Anders Åkerman; Johan Näsman; Fredrik Löwegren	
1993	Finland; Simo Martomaa; Tommi Tölkkö; Mikko Lepo	Norway; Holger Hott Johansen; Bernt Bjørnsgaard; Odin Tellesbø	Poland; Robert Banach; Dariusz Mikusiński; Janusz Porzycz	
1994	Russia; Ivan Murashov; Michael Mamleev; Valentin Novikov	Finland; Jarkko Huovila; Lasse Torpo; Simo Martomaa	Hungary; Tamas Kronvald; Ferenc Levai; Gabor Domonyik	
1995	Denmark; Jesper Damgaard; Mads Ingvardsen; Troels Nielsen	Hungary; Kolos Vadja; Lajos Sarecz; Gabor Domonyik	Finland; Ville Repo; Jarkko Huovila; Miika Hernelahti	
1996	Czech Republic; Michal Horáček; Vladimír Lučan; Luboš Matějů	Slovakia; František Libant; Maroš Bukovac; Marián Dávidík	Switzerland; Urs Müller; David Schneider; Adrian Klauser	
1997	Sweden; Jonas Pilblad; Johan Modig; Per Öberg	Czech Republic; Lukáš Přinda; Michal Horacek; Vladimír Lučan	Slovakia; František Libant; Igor Patras; Marián Dávidík	
1998	Sweden; Rikard Gunnarsson; Mats Troeng; Håkan Peterson	Finland; Pasi Ikonen; Samuli Salmenoja; Jonne Lakanen	France; Thierry Gueorgiou; J-Baptiste Bourrin; François Gonon	
1999	Finland; Pasi Ikonen; Jonne Lakanen; Mikko Heikelä	France; Benoit Peyvel; Thierry Gueorgiou; François Gonon	Switzerland; Beat Studer; Christian Ott; Felix Bentz	
2000	Czech Republic; Jiří Kazda; Jaromír Švihovský; Michal Smola	Sweden; Erik Öhlund; David Andersson; Peter Öberg	Finland; Timo Saarinen; Markus Lindeqvist; Pasi Ikonen	
2001	Czech Republic; Jan Mrázek; Jaromír Vlach; Michal Smola	(Poland); Maciej Grabowski; Wojciech Kowalski; Wojciech Dwojak	Sweden; David Andersson; Erik Andersson; Jan Troeng	
2002	Switzerland; Matthias Merz; Daniel Hubmann; Lukas Ebneter	Finland; Tuomas Tervo; Juha-Matti Huhtanen; Jörgen Wickholm	Sweden; Anders Holmberg; Johan Höij; Erik Andersson	
2003	Russia; Dmitry Tsvetkov; Dmitri Jekaterinin; Aleksei Bortnik	Norway; Kristian Dalby; Lars Skjeset; Audun Weltzien	Switzerland; Hannes Friederich; Matthias Merz; Daniel Hubmann	
2004	Sweden; Johan Lindahl; Mattias Millinger; Martin Johansson	Czech Republic; Jan Palas; Jan Šedivý; Jan Procházka	Switzerland; Andreas Ruedlinger; Fabian Hertner; Matthias Merz	
2005	Norway; Øystein Sørensen; Magne Dæhli; Olav Lundanes	Czech Republic; Adam Chromý; Jan Beneš; Jan Palas	Sweden; John Fredriksson; Erik Rost; Mikael Kristensson	
2006	Estonia; Mihkel Jarveoja; Timo Sild; Markus Puusepp	Sweden; Fredrik Johansson; John Fredriksson; Mikael Kristensson	Norway; Anders Skarholt; Erik Sagvolden; Olav Lundanes	
2007	Czech Republic; Štěpán Kodeda; Jan Beneš; Adam Chromý	Norway; Torgeir Nørbech; Magne Dæhli; Olav Lundanes	Latvia; Mikus Zagata; Kalvis Mihailovs; Anatolijis Tarasovs	
2008	Sweden; Erik Liljekvist; Olle Boström; Johan Runesson	Russia 2 Yury Kiryanov; Georgy Mavchun; Dmitry Masnyy	Norway; Ulf Forseth Indgaard; Bjørn Danielsen Ekeberg; Erik Sagvolden	
2009	Sweden; Olle Boström; Albin Ridefelt; Gustav Bergman	Switzerland; Philipp Sauter; Matthias Kyburz; Martin Hubmann	Denmark; Marius Thrane Ødum; Rasmus Thrane Hansen; Søren Bobach	
2010	Norway; Gaute Hallan Steiwer; Eskil Kinneberg; Vegard Danielsen	Sweden; Olle Boström; Gustav Bergman; Johan Runesson	Denmark; Andreas Hougaard Boesen; Marius Thrane Ødum; Rasmus Thrane Hansen	
2011	Poland; Piotr Parfianowicz; Rafał Podziński; Michał Olejnik	Sweden; Jonas Nordstrom; Richard Olsson; Albin Ridefelt	Czech Republic; Michal Hubáček; Marek Schuster; Pavel Kubát	
2012	Russia; Ivan Kuchmenko; Andrey Kozyrev; Gleb Tikhonov	Denmark; Jakob Ekhard Edsen; Thor Nörskov; Marius Thrane Ödum	Norway; Jon Aukrust Osmoen; Hakon Jarvis Westergard; Eskil Kinneberg	
2013	Czech Republic; Marek Schuster; Adam Chloupek; Michal Hubáček	Sweden; Anton Johansson; Jens Wängdahl; Emil Svensk	Russia; Ivan Kuchmenko; Dmitry Polyakov; Andrey Kozyrev	
2014	Sweden; Assar Hellstrom; Simon Hector; Anton Johansson	Czech Republic; Ondřej Semík; Jonás Hubáček; Marek Minář	Switzerland; Jonas Egger; Tobia Pezzati; Sven Hellmueller	
2015	Finland; Topi Raitanen; Aleksi Niemi; Olli Ojanaho	Norway; Hakon Christiansen; Anders Felde Olaussen; Markus Holter	Sweden; Emil Granqvist; Erik Andersson; Simon Hector	
2016	Switzerland; Thomas Curiger; Riccardo Rancan; Joey Hadorn	Sweden; Anton Forsberg; Simon Hector; Isac von Krusenstierna	Finland; Topias Ahola; Anton Kuukka; Olli Ojanaho	
2017	Norway; Kasper Fosser; Elias Jonsson; Audun Heimdal	Finland; Akseli Ruohola; Aleksi Sorsa; Olli Ojanaho	Russia; Daniil Kashin; Kiril Komarov; Mikhail Kuleshov	
2018	Norway; Havard Eidsmo; Elias Jonsson; Kasper Fosser	Sweden; Jesper Svensk; Simon Imark; Isac von Krusenstierna	Czech Republic; Vojtěch Sýkora; Tomáš Křivda; Daniel Vandas	
2019	Norway; Lukas Liland; Elias Jonsson; Kasper Fosser	Sweden; Samuel Pihlstrom; Gustav Runefors; Axel Granqvist	France; Guilhem Haberkorn; Quentin Moulet; Guilhem Elias	
2021	Sweden; Noel Braun; Viktor Svensk; Axel Elmblad	Hungary; Peter Nagy; Zoltan Bujdoso; Ferenc Jonas	Switzerland; Pascal Schmid; Pascal Schaerer; Florian Freuler	
2022	Sweden; Jesper Johansson; Edvin Nilsson; Noel Braun	Finland; Aaro Ojala; Akseli Virtanen; Touko Seppa	Norway; Mikkel Holt; Martin Vehus Skjerve; Kornelius Kriszat Lovfald	
2023	Czech Republic; Daniel Bolehovsky; Jiri Donda; Jakub Chaloupsky	Switzerland; Joschi Schmid; Elia Ren; Benjamin Wey	Finland; Jussi Raasakka; Santeri Kirjavainen; Aarni Ronkainen	
2024	SUI; David Baumberger; Loic Berger; Matthieu Buehrer	SWE; Edvin Nilsson; Axel Bratt; Svante Selin	FRA; Mathias Lataste; Baptiste Delorme; Bastien Thenoz	
2025	SWE; Ludwig Rosén; Wilmer Salin; Hannes Mogensen	SUI; David Baumberger; Corsin Müller; Loïc Berger	CZE; Prokop Tomášek; Erik Heczko; Daniel Bolehovský	
2026	SWE; Edvin Johansson Liljegren; Anton Jonsson; Ludwig Rosén	FIN; Joona Hirvilahti; Rasmus Toyryla; Aapo Virkajarvi	SUI; Gratian Boehi; Loic Berger; Matthieu Buehrer	

=== Women ===
Year	Gold	Silver	Bronze	Notes
1990	Norway; Hanne Staff; Torunn Fossli Sæthre; Hanne Sandstad	Sweden; Gunilla Svärd; Karin Wollbrand; Marlena Jansson	Finland; Tuija Tammerin; Eija Kujansuu; Mari Lukkarinen	official race?
1991	Finland; Johanna Tiira; Sanna Turakainen; Mari Lukkarinen	Germany; Katrin Renger; Christin Libich; Anke Xylander	Norway; Hanne Staff; Miri Jörgensen; Berit Sofie Grydeland	
1992	Sweden; Lena Hasselström; Maria Sandström; Hanna Larsson	Finland; Riitta Korpela; Sanna Turakainen; Johanna Tiira	Norway; Hanne Staff; Miri Jörgensen; Elisabeth Ingvaldsen	
1993	Switzerland; Brigitte Grüniger; Käthi Widler; Marie-Luce Romanens	Finland; Satu Mäkitammi; Katja Honkala; Liisa Anttila	Norway; Birgitte Husebye; Miri Jörgensen; Elisabeth Ingvaldsen	
1994	Sweden; Pia Olsson; Kristina Kull; Annika Björk	Finland; Satu Mäkitammi; Henna-Riikka Huhta; Anu Heikkilä	Poland; Małgorzata Stankiewicz; Aneta Jabłońska; Ewa Kozłowska	
1995	Czech Republic; Kateřina Mikšová; Kateřina Pracná; Eva Juřeníková	Sweden; Maria Dahlin; Kristin Backåkers; Annika Björk	Switzerland; Susi Widler; Susanne Wehrli; Sara Wegmüller	
1996	Romania; Eniko Gall; Zsuzsa Fey; Enikö Fey	Switzerland; Simone Luder; Regula Hulliger; Sara Wegmüller	Russia; Julia Morozova; Olga Trekhova; Tatiana Pereliaeva	
1997	Sweden; Emma Engstrand; Jenny Johansson; Catalina Asp	Czech Republic; Zuzana Macúchová; Vendula Klechová; Michaela Skoumalová	Switzerland; Sara Wegmüller; Regula Hulliger; Simone Luder	
1998	Finland; Heli Jukkola; Riina Kuuselo; Hanna Heiskanen	Russia; Tatiana Kostyleva; Galina Galkina (Note: Galkina is née of Galina Vinogradova.); Tatiana Pereliaeva	Switzerland; Astrid Fritschi; Simone Luder; Regula Hulliger	
1999	Russia; Tatiana Kostyleva; Eugenia Belova; Tatiana Pereliaeva	Ukraine; Irina Kupriyanova; Viktoria Plokhenko; Nataliya Potopalska	Switzerland; Angela Wild; Astrid Fritschi; Regula Hulliger	
2000	Russia; Julia Sedina; Eugenia Belova; Tatiana Pereliaeva	Sweden; Maria Bergkvist; Kajsa Guterstam; Camila Berglund	Finland; Sara Forsström; Maria Rantala; Minna Kauppi	
2001	Sweden; Anna Lampinen; Kajsa Nilsson; Maria Bergkvist	Czech Republic; Dana Brožková; Iva Rufferová; Martina Dočkalová	Finland; Pinja Satri; Bodil Holmström; Minna Kauppi	
2002	Switzerland; Franziska Wolleb; Martina Fritschy; Lea Müller	Finland; Tiina Kivimäki; Pinja Satri; Minna Kauppi	Sweden; Helena Jansson; Lina Persson; Anna Lampinen	
2003	Finland; Annamaria Väli-Klemelä; Heini Wennman; Silja Tarvonen	Sweden; Anna Lampinen; Sofia Karlsson; Helena Jansson	Norway; Marte Grande Ostby; Betty Ann Bjerkreim Nilsen; Line Hagman	
2004	Sweden; Elina Skantze; Anna Persson; Helena Jansson	Finland; Anni-Maija Fincke; Heini Wennman; Silja Tarvonen	Norway; Elise Egseth; Betty Ann Bjerkreim Nilsen; Jorid Flatekval	
2005	Norway; Elise Egseth; Mari Fasting; Betty Ann Bjerkreim Nilsen	Sweden; Elina Skantze; Helena Jansson; Anna Persson	Finland; Saila Kinni; Paula Iso-Markku; Silja Tarvonen	
2006	Russia; Ekaterina Terekhova; Tatiana Kozlova; Maria Shilova	Sweden; Linnea Lindstrom; Anna Persson; Eva Svensson	Finland; Sofia Haajanen; Saila Kinni; Heini Wennman	
2007	Norway; Kine Hallan Steiwer; Silje Jahren; Siri Ulvestad	Sweden; Eva Svensson; Sara Eskilsson; Jenny Lönnkvist	Switzerland; Sara Würmli; Judith Wyder; Sabine Hauswirth	
2008	Sweden; Beata Falk; Lina Strand; Jenny Lönnkvist	Denmark; Ida Bobach; Signe Klinting; Maja Alm	Norway 2 Annette Baklid; Kine Hallan Steiwer; Mariann Ulvestad	
2009	Switzerland; Fiona Kirk; Sophie Tritschler; Julia Gross	Norway; Ingunn Nydal; Katrine Skjerve; Jevne Arnesen	Denmark; Emma Klingenberg; Ida Bobach; Signe Klinting	
2010	Denmark; Emma Klingenberg; Ida Bobach; Signe Klinting	Czech Republic; Denisa Kosová; Jana Knapová; Tereza Novotná	Russia; Natalia Vinogradova; Anastasia Tikhonova; Anastasia Trubkina	
2011	Sweden; Helena Karlsson; Linea Martinsson; Tove Alexandersson	Czech Republic; Adéla Indráková; Denisa Kosová; Tereza Novotná	Denmark; Ita Klingenberg; Emma Klingenberg; Ida Bobach	
2012	Denmark; Stine Bagger Hagner; Ita Klingenberg; Emma Klingenberg	Sweden; Helena Karlsson; Frida Sandberg; Tove Alexandersson	Switzerland; Mirjam Hellmüller; Marion Aebi; Sandrine Müller	
2013	Czech Republic; Lenka Knapová; Kateřina Chromá; Vendula Horčičková	Finland; Anna Haataja; Henna-Riikka Haikonen; Johanna Hulkkonen	Sweden; Andrea Svensson; Hilda Forsgren; Tilda Johansson	
2014	Sweden; Tilda Johansson; Frida Sandberg; Sara Hagstrom	Norway; Heidi Mårtensson; Gunvor Hov Høydal; Mathilde Rundhaug	Switzerland; Paula Gros; Sina Tommer; Lisa Schubnell	
2015	Sweden; Andrea Svensson; Johanna Oberg; Sara Hagstrom	Switzerland; Sofie Bachmann; Simona Aebersold; Sandrine Mueller	Norway; Heidi Mårtensson; Tonje Vassend; Marie Olaussen	
2016	Switzerland; Paula Gross; Sofie Bachmann; Simona Aebersold	Finland; Leenukka Hanhijarvi; Enni Jalava; Anna Haataja	Norway; Ingrid Lundanes; Anine Lome; Eide Ingeborg	
2017	Sweden; Lisa Jonsson Nordin; Sanna Fast; Linnea Golsater	Switzerland; Valerie Aebischer; Sofie Bachmann; Simona Aebersold	Norway; Victoria Haestad Bjornstad; Ingrid Lundanes; Marie Olaussen	
2018	Russia; Dasha Panchenko; Kristina Smirnova; Veronika Kalinina	Czech Republic; Tereza Čechová; Barbora Chaloupská; Tereza Janošíková	Norway; Ragne Wiklund; Malin Sandstad; Victoria Haestad Bjornstad	
2019	Great Britain; Megan Keith; Fiona Bunn; Grace Molloy	Russia; Irina Lazareva; Kristina Smirnova; Veronika Kalinina	Sweden; Ella Olsson; Johanna Kaellvik Leufven; Alva Sonesson	
2021	Sweden; Tilda Ostberg; Petrina Costermans; Hanna Lundberg	Hungary; Boglarka Czako; Viktoria Mag; Csilla Gardonyi	Czech Republic; Michaela Dittrichová; Lucie Smelíková; Markéta Muličková	
2022	Sweden; Hilda Holmqvist Johansson; Elsa Sonesson; Hanna Lundberg	Hungary; Boglarka Czako; Viktoria Mag; Rita Máramarosi	Finland; Elsa Ankelo; Salla Isoherranen; Eeva Liina Ojanaho	
2023	Hungary; Boglarka Czako; Viktoria Mag; Rita Maramarosi	Czech Republic; Anna Karlova; Marketa Mulickova; Lucie Dittrichova	Norway; Kristin Melby Jacobsen; Mathea Gloeersen; Pia Young Vik	
2024	FIN; Elli Punto; Virna Pellikka; Eeva Liina Ojanaho	NOR; Ingeborg Roll Mosland; Elisa Gotsch Iversen; Mathea Gloeersen	CZE; Michaela Novotna; Viktorie Skachova; Lucie Dittrichova	
2025	SUI; Henriette Radzikowski; Kati Hotz; Seline Sannwald	SWE; Signe Hördegård; Alva Björk; Freja Hjerne	CZE; Viktorie Vyziblová; Barbora Strýčková; Kateřina Štěpová	
2026	SWE; Tilia Olsson; Freja Hjerne; Felicia Persson	NOR; Jenny Danevad; Elise Renard; Minna Wingstedt	SUI; Rahel Good; Leonie Mathis; Sarina Grimm	

== Medal table ==
Updated after JWOC 2019.

Rank	Nation	Gold	Silver	Bronze	Total
1	Sweden (SWE)	49	59	36	144
2	Finland (FIN)	32	31	38	101
3	Norway (NOR)	32	24	27	83
4	Switzerland (SUI)	29	16	31	76
5	Denmark (DEN)	18	14	12	44
6	Czech Republic (CZE)	16	26	18	60
7	Russia (RUS)	15	8	13	36
8	Poland (POL)	6	6	4	16
9	Hungary (HUN)	4	4	6	14
10	Romania (ROU)	4	0	1	5
11	New Zealand (NZL)	3	1	1	5
12	France (FRA)	2	5	8	15
13	Germany (GER)	2	2	1	5
14	Australia (AUS)	2	1	3	6
15	Great Britain (GBR)	1	3	3	7
16	Estonia (EST)	1	1	2	4
17	Austria (AUT)	1	1	0	2
17	Italy (ITA)	1	1	0	2
17	Soviet Union (URS)	1	1	0	2
20	Lithuania (LTU)	0	2	3	5
21	Slovakia (SVK)	0	1	2	3
21	Ukraine (UKR)	0	1	2	3
23	Czechoslovakia (TCH)	0	1	1	2
24	Spain (ESP)	0	1	0	1
25	Belarus (BLR)	0	0	1	1
25	Bulgaria (BUL)	0	0	1	1
25	Canada (CAN)	0	0	1	1
25	Latvia (LAT)	0	0	1	1
Totals (28 entries)		219	210	216	645

The 2006 Junior World Champion in the long-distance event for women was Johanna Allston (or Hanny Allston) of Australia. It was the first time in this event that a gold medal has been won by a non-European nation. Since then, Matt Ogden (2012), Aston Key (2019), and Tim Robertson (2014 and 2015), are the only non-Europeans to win gold medals at the Junior World Championships.

== Gallery ==
JWOC Gold Medalists
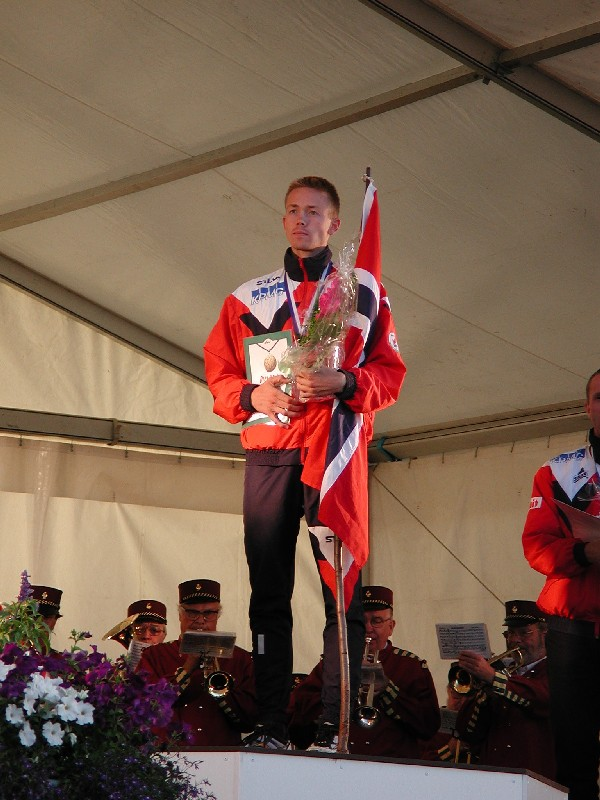
Jørgen Rostrup (1997, 1998)

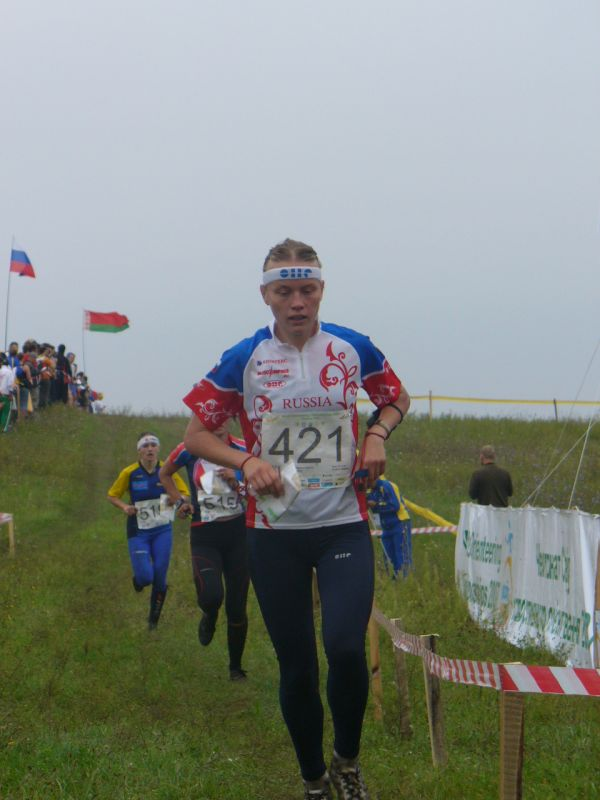
Tatiana Pereliaeva (1998, 1999, 2000 x2)

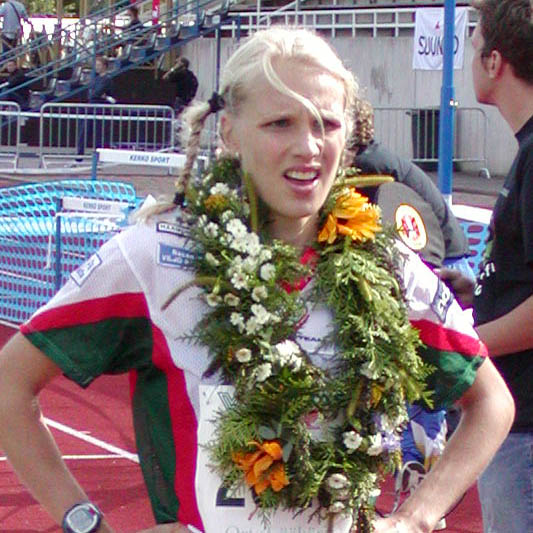
Minna Kauppi (2001, 2002)

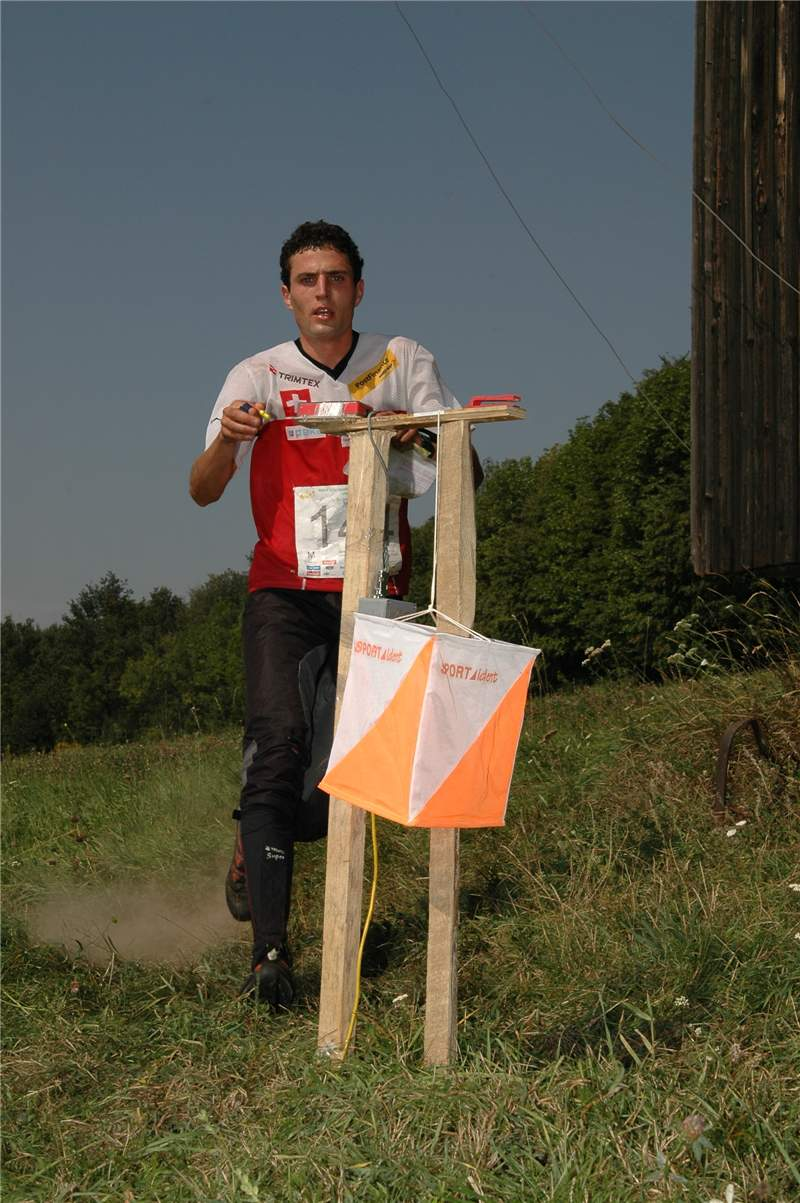
Matthias Merz (2002, 2003, 2004)

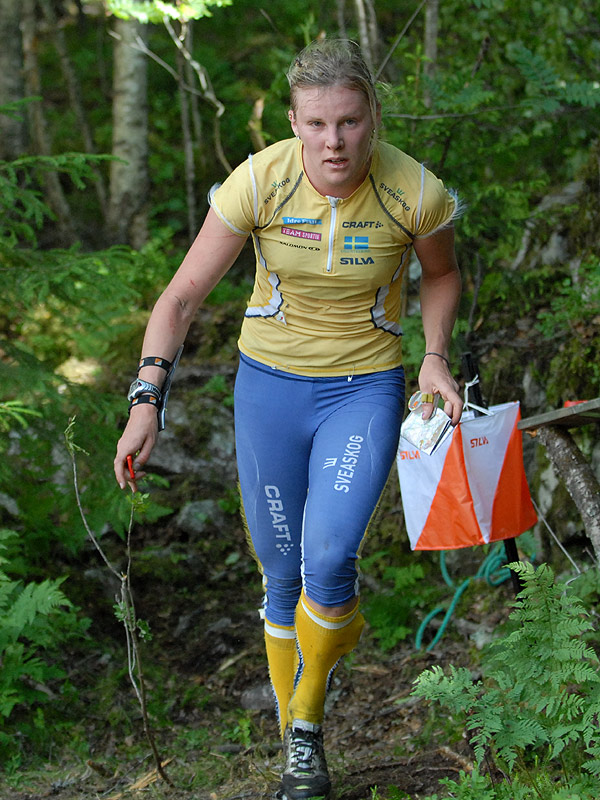
Helena Jansson (2004 x2)

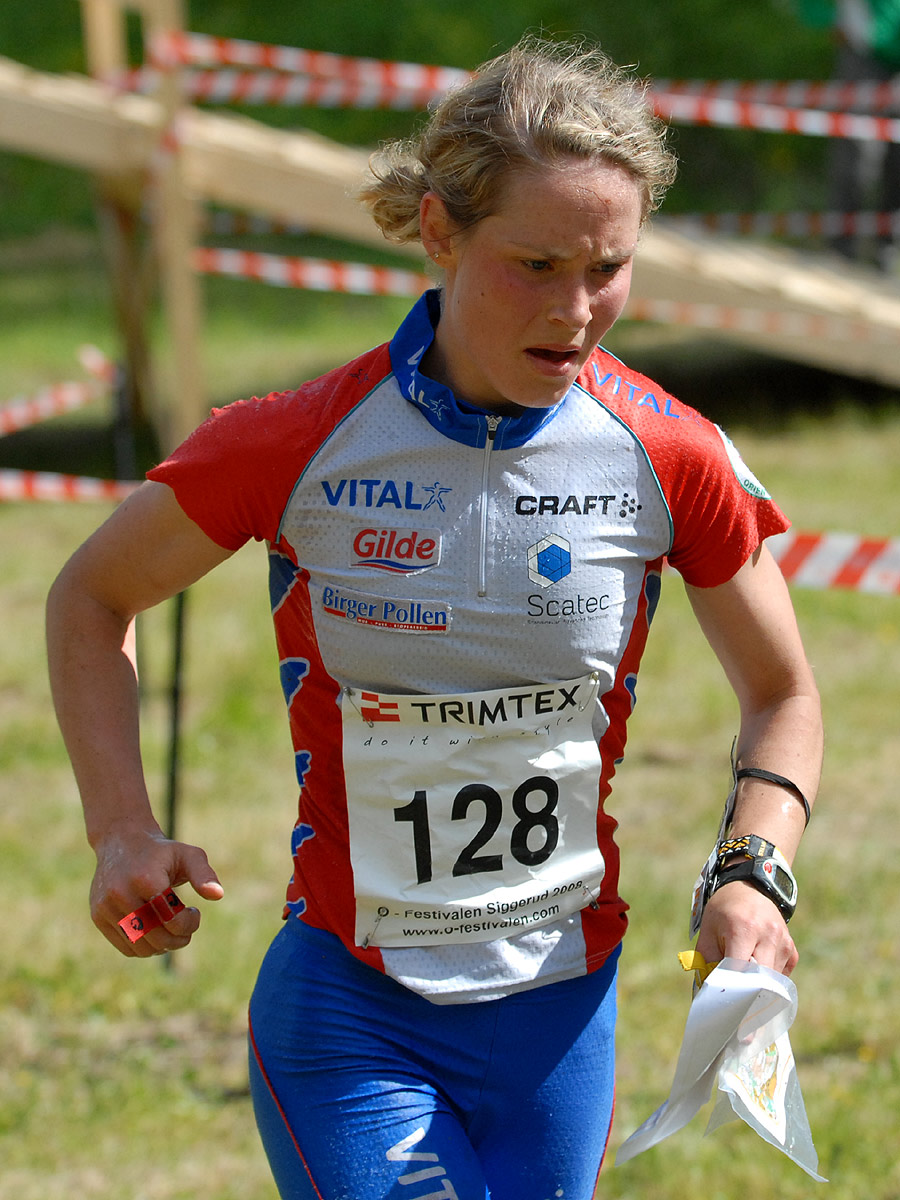
Mari Fasting (2005 x2)

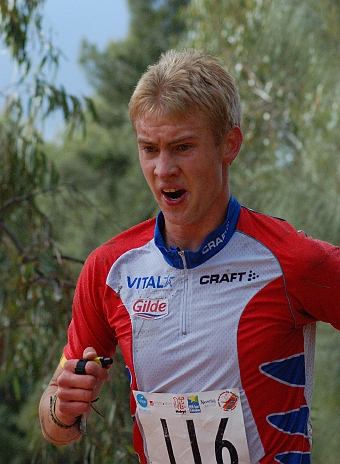
Olav Lundanes (2005 x2, 2007 x2)

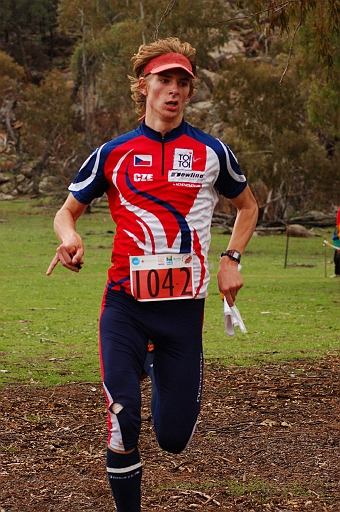
Jan Beneš (2006, 2007)

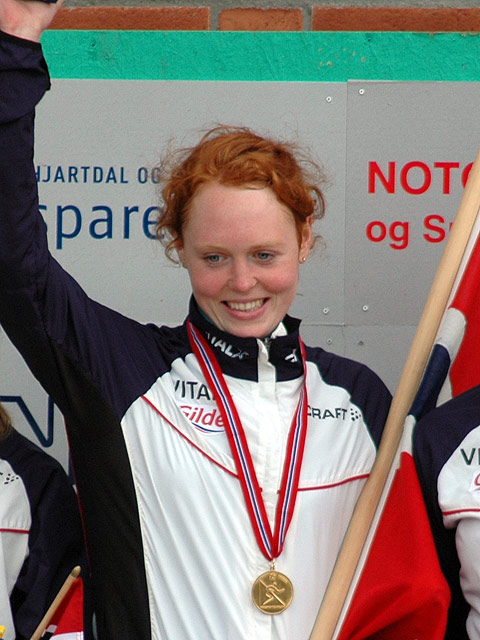
Betty Ann Bjerkreim Nilsen (2005, 2006)

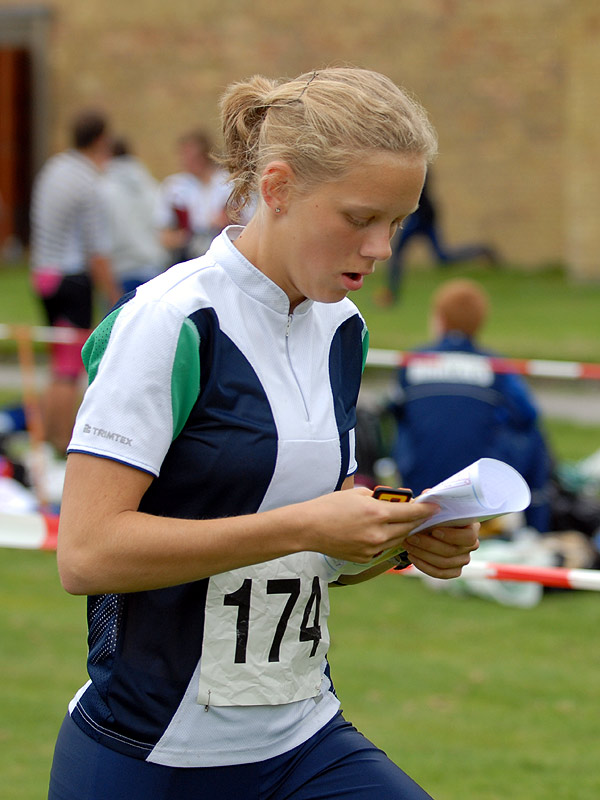
Siri Ulvestad (2007 x2)

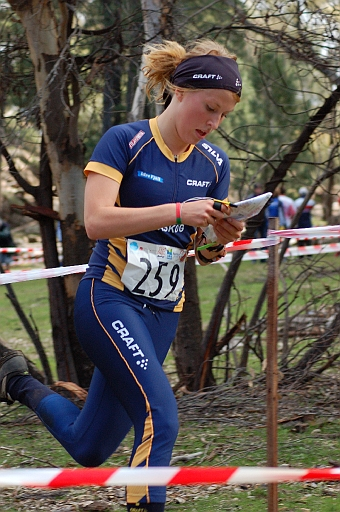
Jenny Lönnkvist (2007, 2008 x2, 2009)

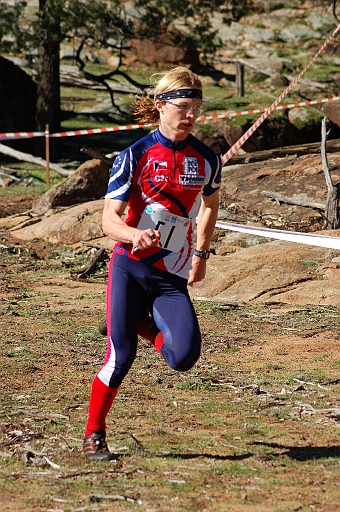
Štěpán Kodeda (2008, 2009)

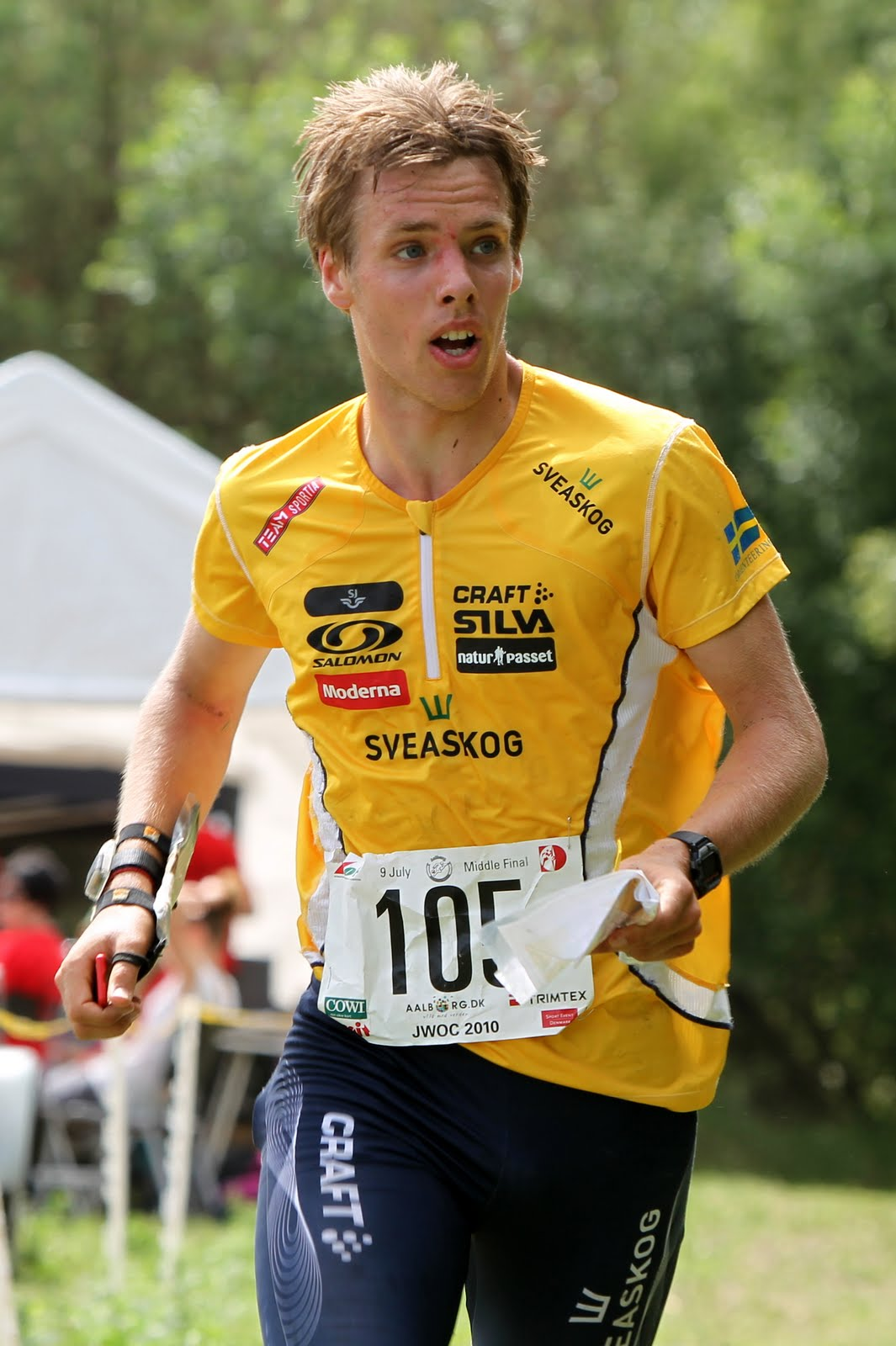
Johan Runesson (2008 x3)

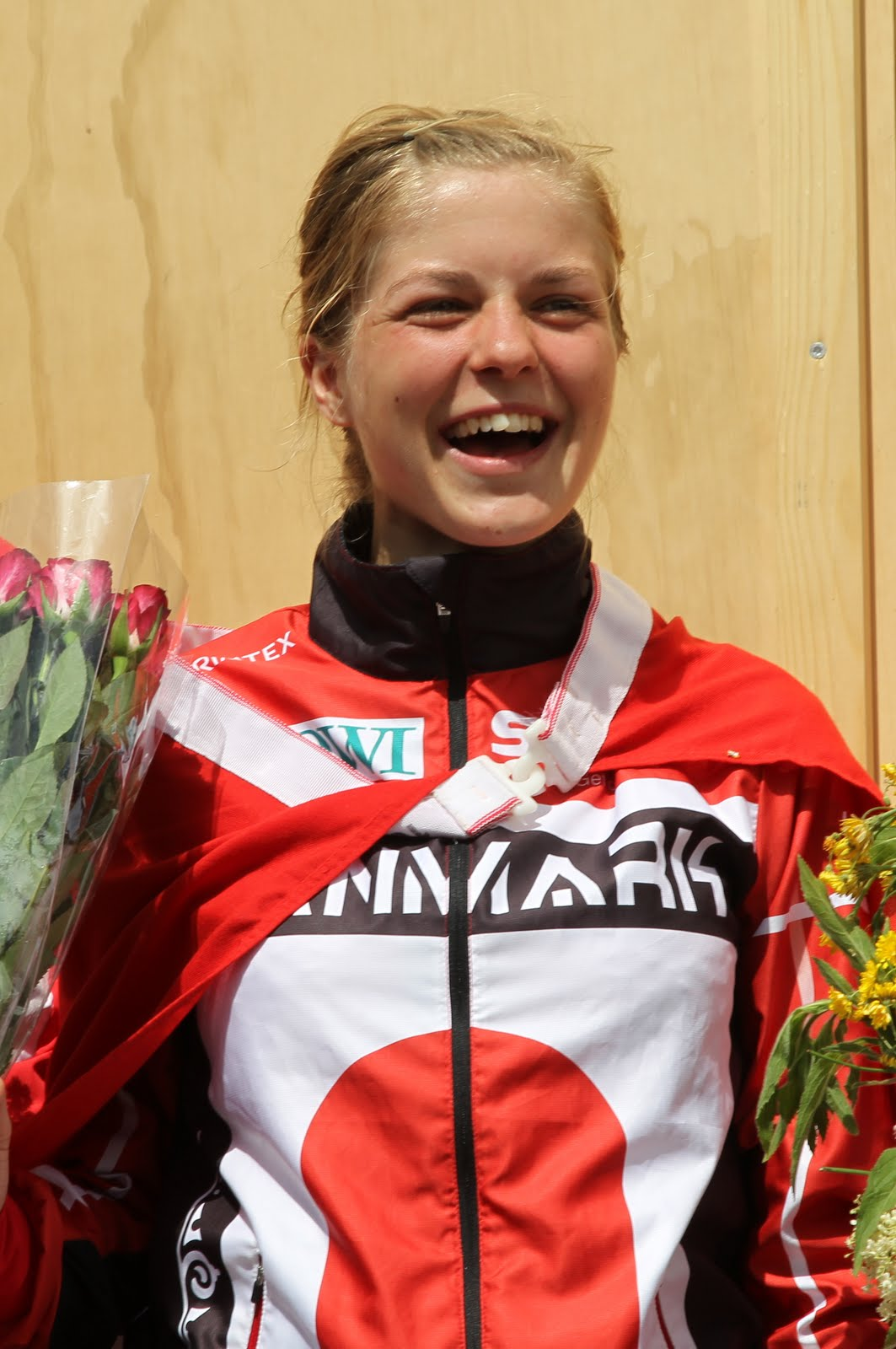
Ida Bobach (2009, 2010 x3, 2011 x3)

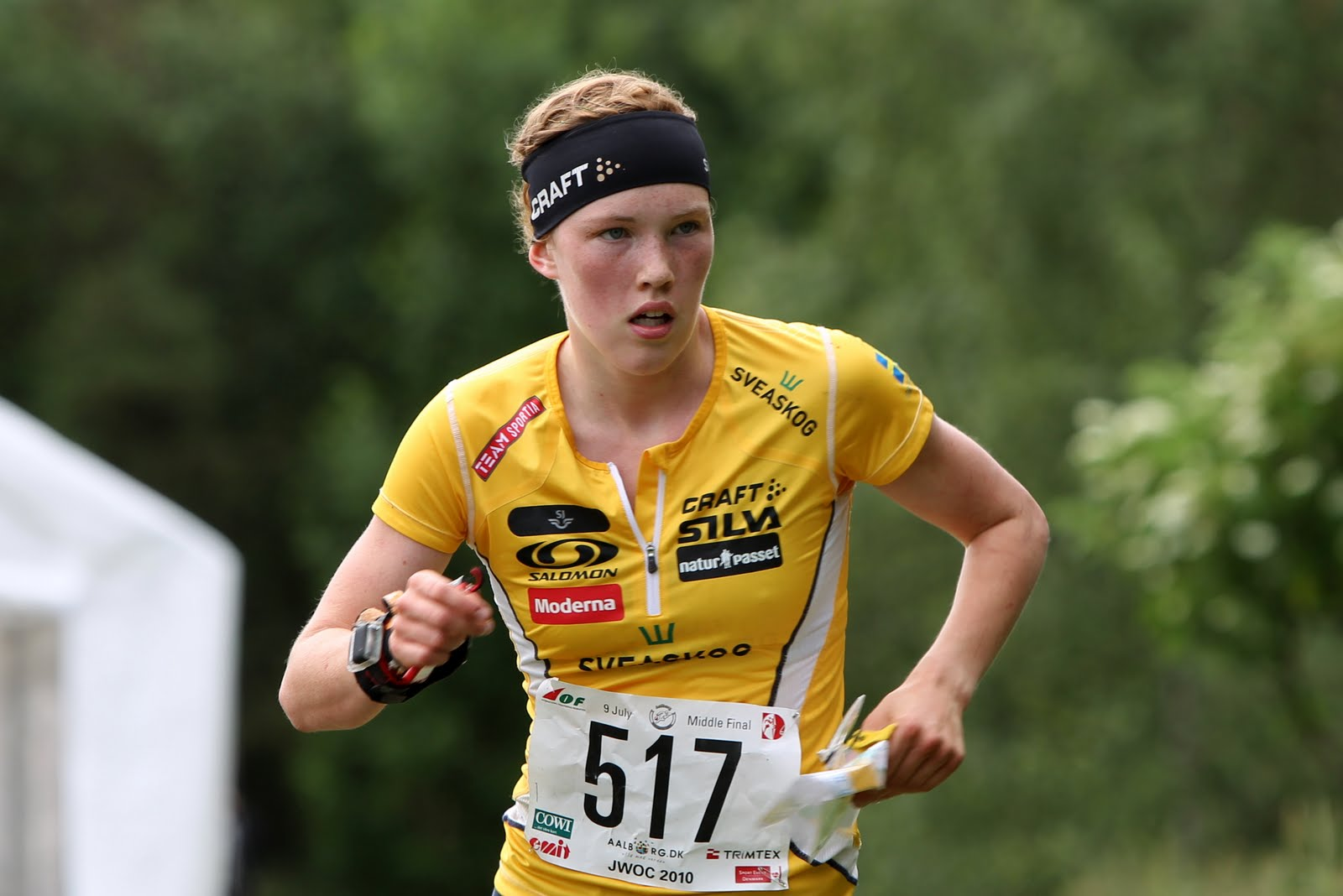
Tove Alexandersson (2009, 2010, 2011, 2012 x2)

== See also ==
- World Orienteering Championships
- European Orienteering Championships
- World University Orienteering Championships
- Orienteering World Cup
