= Jenny Lönnkvist =

Swedish orienteering competitor

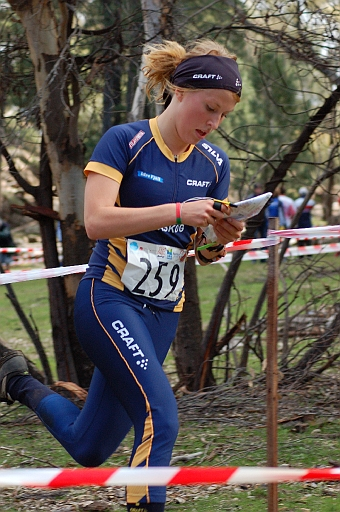
- Lönnkvist at JWOC 2007

Personal information
- Born: March 28, 1989 (age 37)
Medal record
Women's orienteering
Representing Sweden
Junior World Championships
Gold medal – first place	2007 Dubbo	Middle
Gold medal – first place	2008 Göteborg	Long
Gold medal – first place	2008 Göteborg	Relay
Gold medal – first place	2009 Primiero	Sprint
Silver medal – second place	2007 Dubbo	Relay
Silver medal – second place	2009 Primiero	Long
Bronze medal – third place	2008 Göteborg	Sprint

Jenny Lönnkvist (born March 28, 1989) is a Swedish orienteering competitor, and junior world champion.

== Junior career ==
Lönnkvist became Junior World Champion in the middle distance in Dubbo in 2007, and received a silver medal in relay. She received a bronze medal in sprint at the 2008 Junior World Championships in Gothenburg.

She became Swedish junior champion in night orienteering in 2007, and again in 2008.

== Senior career ==
Lönnkvist participated at the 2009 World Orienteering Championships in Hungary, where she qualified for the middle distance final.

== Personal life ==
Lönnkvist is daughter of Lars Lönnkvist and Barbro Lönnkvist, both international orienteers.
