= Mari Lukkarinen =

Finnish orienteering competitor

Medal record

Women's orienteering

Representing Finland

Junior World Championships
Gold medal – first place	1991 Berlin	Classic
Gold medal – first place	1991 Berlin	Relay
Bronze medal – third place	1990 Älvsbyn	Classic
Bronze medal – third place	1990 Älvsbyn	Relay

Mari Lukkarinen is a Finnish orienteering competitor.

== Junior career ==
She won a bronze medal in the classic distance at the 1990 Junior World Orienteering Championships, and a gold medal in 1991.

== Senior career ==
She competed for Finland at the 1991 World Orienteering Championships in Mariánské Lázně, where she placed fifth in the relay, together with Kirsi Tiira, Eija Koskivaara and Marja Liisa Portin.
