= Siri Ulvestad =

Norwegian orienteer (born 1988)

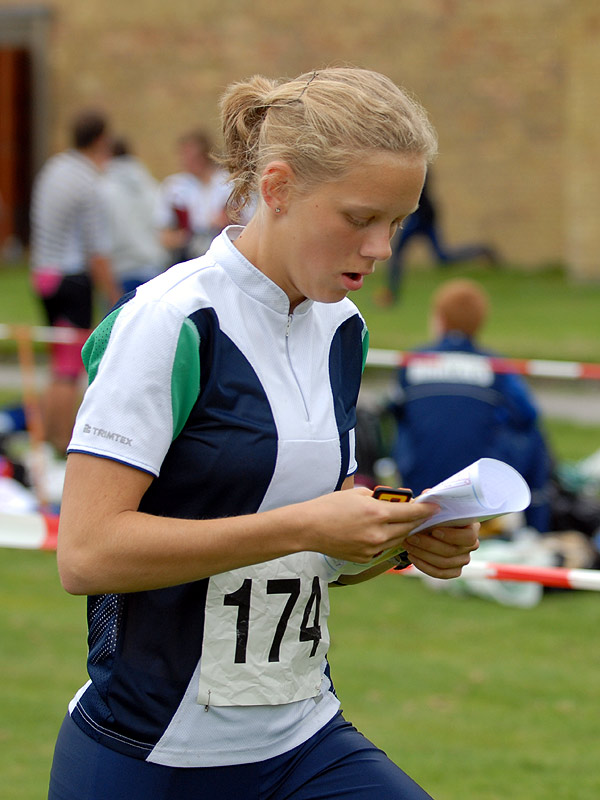
- Ulvestad in 2007

Medal record

Women's orienteering

Representing Norway

Junior World Championships
Gold medal – first place	2007 Dubbo	Long distance
Gold medal – first place	2007 Dubbo	Relay
Bronze medal – third place	2008 Göteborg	Long distance

Siri Ulvestad (born 30 September 1988) is a Norwegian orienteering competitor and cross-country skier. She is a two-time Junior World Orienteering Champion.

== Junior career ==
Ulvestad competed at the 2007 Junior World Orienteering Championships in Dubbo, where she received a gold medal in the long distance and a gold medal in the relay event.

She participated at the 2007 Nordic Championships for juniors in Bornholm, where she received a gold medal in the sprint distance.
