= 2016 Orienteering World Cup =

International orienteering competition

World Cup events
- Individual: 10
- Relay: 4

Men's World Cup
- 1st: Matthias Kyburz (SUI)
- 2nd: Daniel Hubmann (SUI)
- 3rd: Olav Lundanes (NOR)
- Most wins: Matthias Kyburz (SUI) (5)

Women's World Cup
- 1st: Tove Alexandersson (SWE)
- 2nd: Judith Wyder (SUI)
- 3rd: Maja Alm (DEN)
- Most wins: Tove Alexandersson (SWE) (4); Judith Wyder (SUI) (4)

Team World Cup
- 1st: Switzerland
- 2nd: Denmark
- 3rd: Sweden
- Most wins: Switzerland (2)

The 2016 Orienteering World Cup was the 22nd edition of the Orienteering World Cup. The 2016 Orienteering World Cup consisted of 10 individual events and four sprint relay events. The events were located in Poland, Czech Republic, Sweden and Switzerland. The European Orienteering Championships in Jeseník, Czech Republic and the 2016 World Orienteering Championships in Strömstad, Sweden, were included in the World Cup.

Matthias Kyburz of Switzerland won his third overall title. Tove Alexandersson of Sweden won her third consecutive overall title in the women's World Cup.

== Events ==
=== Men ===
No.	Venue	Distance	Date	Winner	Second	Third	Ref.
Round 1
1	Wrocław, Poland	Middle	30 April	(Norway) Olav Lundanes	(Norway) Carl Godager Kaas	(Sweden) Albin Ridefeldt	
2	Wrocław, Poland	Sprint	1 May	(Switzerland) Matthias Kyburz	(Switzerland) Daniel Hubmann	(Sweden) Jonas Leandersson	
Round 2 - European Championships
3	Jeseník, Czech Republic	Sprint (EOC)	22 May	(Switzerland) Matthias Kyburz	(Sweden) Gustav Bergman	(Switzerland) Florian Howald	
4	Jeseník, Czech Republic	Long (EOC)	24 May	(Switzerland) Daniel Hubmann	(Norway) Magne Dæhli	(Sweden) Martin Regborn	
5	Jeseník, Czech Republic	Middle (EOC)	27 May	(Switzerland) Matthias Kyburz	(Sweden) Gustav Bergman	(France) Lucas Basset	
Round 3 - World Championships
6	Strömstad/Tanum, Sweden	Sprint (WOC)	20 August	(Sweden) Jerker Lysell	(Switzerland) Matthias Kyburz	(Switzerland) Daniel Hubmann	
7	Strömstad/Tanum, Sweden	Middle (WOC)	23 August	(Switzerland) Matthias Kyburz	(Norway) Olav Lundanes	(Switzerland) Daniel Hubmann	
8	Strömstad/Tanum, Sweden	Long (WOC)	25 August	(Norway) Olav Lundanes	(France) Thierry Gueorgiou	(Switzerland) Daniel Hubmann	
Round 4 - Finals
9	Aarau, Switzerland	Long	15 October	(Switzerland) Matthias Kyburz	(Norway) Olav Lundanes	(Norway) Carl Godager Kaas	
10	Aarau, Switzerland	Sprint	16 October	(Sweden) Jonas Leandersson	(Switzerland) Matthias Kyburz	(Switzerland) Martin Hubmann	

=== Women ===
No.	Venue	Distance	Date	Winner	Second	Third	Ref.
Round 1
1	Wrocław, Poland	Middle	30 April	(Sweden) Helena Jansson	(Sweden) Tove Alexandersson	(Russia) Svetlana Mironova	
2	Wrocław, Poland	Sprint	1 May	(Switzerland) Judith Wyder	(Denmark) Maja Alm	(Sweden) Tove Alexandersson (Finland) Marika Teini (Ukraine) Nadiya Volynska	
Round 2 - European Championships
3	Jeseník, Czech Republic	Sprint (EOC)	22 May	(Switzerland) Judith Wyder	(Ukraine) Nadiya Volynska	(Denmark) Maja Alm (Russia) Galina Vinogradova	
4	Jeseník, Czech Republic	Long (EOC)	24 May	(Sweden) Tove Alexandersson	(Norway) Anne Margrethe Hausken Nordberg	(Russia) Svetlana Mironova	
5	Jeseník, Czech Republic	Middle (EOC)	27 May	(Sweden) Tove Alexandersson	(Switzerland) Judith Wyder	(Finland) Marika Teini	
Round 3 - World Championships
6	Strömstad/Tanum, Sweden	Sprint (WOC)	20 August	(Denmark) Maja Alm	(Switzerland) Judith Wyder	(Belarus) Anastasia Denisova	
7	Strömstad/Tanum, Sweden	Middle (WOC)	23 August	(Sweden) Tove Alexandersson	(Norway) Heidi Østlid Bagstevold	(Russia) Natalia Gemperle	
8	Strömstad/Tanum, Sweden	Long (WOC)	25 August	(Sweden) Tove Alexandersson	(Russia) Natalia Gemperle	(Norway) Anne Margrethe Hausken Nordberg	
Round 4 - Finals
9	Aarau, Switzerland	Long	15 October	(Switzerland) Judith Wyder	(Switzerland) Sabine Hauswirth	(Sweden) Tove Alexandersson	
10	Aarau, Switzerland	Sprint	16 October	(Switzerland) Judith Wyder	(Denmark) Maja Alm	(Sweden) Tove Alexandersson	

=== Sprint Relay ===
	Venue		Date	Winner	2nd	3rd
1	Wrocław, Poland		2 May	Switzerland; Judith Wyder; Andreas Kyburz; Matthias Kyburz; Rahel Friedrich	Sweden; Tove Alexandersson; Emil Svensk; Jonas Leandersson; Helena Jansson	Denmark; Ceciie Friberg Klysner; Tue Lassen; Søren Bobach; Maja Alm
2	Jeseník, Czech Republic	(EOC)	24 May	Russia; Natalia Vinogradova; Gleb Tikhonov; Andrey Khramov; Galina Vinogradova	Denmark; Ceciie Friberg Klysner; Tue Lassen; Søren Bobach; Maja Alm	Switzerland; Judith Wyder; Andreas Kyburz; Martin Hubmann; Rahel Friedrich
3	Strömstad, Sweden	(WOC)	21 August	Denmark; Ceciie Friberg Klysner; Tue Lassen; Søren Bobach; Maja Alm	Switzerland; Rahel Friedrich; Florian Howald; Martin Hubmann; Judith Wyder	Sweden; Lina Strand; Gustav Bergman; Jonas Leandersson; Helena Jansson
4	Aarau, Switzerland		14 October	Switzerland; Rahel Friedrich; Matthias Kyburz; Daniel Hubmann; Judith Wyder	Sweden; Lina Strand; Emil Svensk; Jonas Leandersson; Helena Jansson	Switzerland 2 Elena Roos; Andreas Kyburz; Florian Howald; Sabine Hauswirth

== Points distribution ==
The 40 best runners in each event were awarded points. The winner was awarded 100 points. In WC events 1 to 8, the seven best results counted in the overall classification. In the finals (WC 9 and WC 10), both results counted.

Rank	1	2	3	4	5	6	7	8	9	10	11	12	13	14	15	16	17	18	19	20	21	22	23	24	25	26	27	28	29	30	31	32	33	34	35	36	37	38	39	40
Points	100	80	60	50	45	40	37	35	33	31	30	29	28	27	26	25	24	23	22	21	20	19	18	17	16	15	14	13	12	11	10	9	8	7	6	5	4	3	2	1

== Overall standings ==
This section shows the final standings after all 10 individual events.

=== Men ===
Rank	Athlete	Points
1	(Switzerland) Matthias Kyburz	734
2	(Switzerland) Daniel Hubmann	427
3	(Norway) Olav Lundanes	380
4	(Sweden) Gustav Bergman	330
5	(Sweden) Jonas Leandersson	316
6	(Norway) Carl Godager Kaas	285
7	(Norway) Magne Dæhli	276
8	(Sweden) Martin Regborn	267
9	(Switzerland) Florian Howald	259
10	(France) Lucas Basset	225

=== Women ===
Rank	Athlete	Points
1	(Sweden) Tove Alexandersson	660
2	(Switzerland) Judith Wyder	627
3	(Denmark) Maja Alm	490
4	(Switzerland) Sabine Hauswirth	304
5	(Russia) Natalia Gemperle	290
6	(Russia) Svetlana Mironova	284
7	(Finland) Merja Rantanen	281
8	(Switzerland) Julia Gross	259
9	(Finland) Marika Teini	241
10	(Sweden) Lina Strand	232

=== Sprint Relay ===
The table shows the final standings after all four relay events. All results counted in the overall standings.

Plass	Utøver	Points
1	Switzerland	280
2	Denmark	240
3	Sweden	220
4	Russia	200
5	Norway	135
6	Finland	127
7	Czech Republic	120
8	(United Kingdom) Great Britain	117
9	France	108
10	Austria	103

== Achievements ==
Only individual competitions.
