= 2014 Orienteering World Cup =

International orienteering competition

World Cup events
- Individual: 14

Men's World Cup
- 1st: Daniel Hubmann (SUI)
- 2nd: Fabian Hertner (SUI)
- 3rd: Matthias Kyburz (SUI)
- Most wins: Daniel Hubmann (SUI) (5)

Women's World Cup
- 1st: Tove Alexandersson (SWE)
- 2nd: Judith Wyder (SUI)
- 3rd: Maja Alm (DEN)
- Most wins: Tove Alexandersson (SWE) (5)

Team World Cup
- 1st: No team events held

The 2014 Orienteering World Cup was the 20th edition of the Orienteering World Cup. The 2014 Orienteering World Cup consisted of 14 events, all individual competitions. The events were located in Turkey, Spain, Portugal, Norway, Finland, Italy and Switzerland. The European Orienteering Championships in Palmela, Portugal and the 2014 World Orienteering Championships in Venezia and Trentino, Italy were included in the World Cup.

In the women's World Cup, Daniel Hubmann of Switzerland won his fifth title in total. Tove Alexandersson of Sweden won her first overall title in the women's World Cup.

== Events ==
=== Men ===
| No. | Venue | Distance | Date | Winner | Second | Third | Ref. |
Round 1 - Turkey
| 1 | Antalya, Turkey | Mellom | 1 March | (Switzerland) Daniel Hubmann | (Switzerland) Matthias Kyburz | (Sweden) Gustav Bergman | |
Round 2 - Spain
| 2 | Murcia, Spain | Long | 5 April | Annulled | | | |
| 3 | Murcia, Spain | Middle | 6 April | (Ukraine) Oleksandr Kratov | (Switzerland) Daniel Hubmann | (Estonia) Timo Sild | |
Round 3 - European Championships
| 4 | Palmela, Portugal | Sprint (EOC) | 13 April | (Sweden) Jonas Leandersson | (Sweden) Jerker Lysell | (Switzerland) Martin Hubmann | |
| 5 | Palmela, Portugal | Middle (EOC) | 14 April | (Switzerland) Daniel Hubmann | (Switzerland) Fabian Hertner | (France) Thierry Gueorgiou | |
| 6 | Palmela, Portugal | Long (EOC) | 15 April | (Switzerland) Daniel Hubmann | (Norway) Olav Lundanes | (Sweden) Fredrik Johansson | |
Round 4 - Finland/Norway
| 7 | Kongsberg, Norway | Middle | 7 June | (Norway) Olav Lundanes | (Finland) Pasi Ikonen | (Norway) Carl Godager Kaas (Switzerland) Matthias Kyburz | |
| 8 | Kongsberg, Norway | Long | 8 June | (Ukraine) Oleksandr Kratov | (Norway) Hans Gunnar Omdal | (Norway) Magne Dæhli | |
| 9 | Imatra, Finland | Sprint | 11 June | (Sweden) Jonas Leandersson | (Switzerland) Daniel Hubmann | (Belgium) Yannick Michiels | |
Round 5 - World Championships
| 10 | Venezia, Italy | Sprint (WOC) | 5 July | (Denmark) Søren Bobach | (Switzerland) Daniel Hubmann | (Denmark) Tue Lassen | |
| 11 | Trentino, Italy | Long (WOC) | 9 July | (France) Thierry Gueorgiou | (Switzerland) Daniel Hubmann | (Norway) Olav Lundanes | |
| 12 | Trentino, Italy | Middle (WOC) | 11 July | (Norway) Olav Lundanes | (Switzerland) Fabian Hertner | (Ukraine) Oleksandr Kratov | |
Round 6 - Finals
| 13 | Liestal, Switzerland | Middle | 4 October | (Switzerland) Daniel Hubmann | (Switzerland) Florian Howald | (Denmark) Søren Bobach | |
| 14 | Liestal, Switzerland | Sprint | 5 October | (Switzerland) Daniel Hubmann | (Switzerland) Fabian Hertner | (Sweden) Jerker Lysell | |

=== Women ===
| No. | Venue | Distance | Date | Winner | Second | Third | Ref. |
Round 1 - Turkey
| 1 | Antalya, Turkey | Mellom | 1 March | (Sweden) Tove Alexandersson | (Sweden) Helena Jansson | (Switzerland) Judith Wyder | |
Round 2 - Spain
| 2 | Murcia, Spain | Long | 5 April | (Sweden) Tove Alexandersson | (Sweden) Lena Eliasson | (Sweden) Lilian Forsgren | |
| 3 | Murcia, Spain | Middle | 6 April | (Sweden) Lena Eliasson | (Russia) Anastasia Tikhonova | (Sweden) Helena Jansson | |
Round 3 - European Championships
| 4 | Palmela, Portugal | Sprint (EOC) | 13 April | (Switzerland) Judith Wyder | (Ukraine) Nadiya Volynska | (Switzerland) Julia Gross | |
| 5 | Palmela, Portugal | Middle (EOC) | 14 April | (Denmark) Signe Søes | (Denmark) Maja Alm | (Sweden) Tove Alexandersson | |
| 6 | Palmela, Portugal | Long (EOC) | 15 April | (Switzerland) Judith Wyder | (Russia) Svetlana Mironova | (United Kingdom) Catherine Taylor | |
Round 4 - Finland/Norway
| 7 | Kongsberg, Norway | Middle | 7 June | (Sweden) Tove Alexandersson | (Sweden) Helena Jansson | (Finland) Minna Kauppi | |
| 8 | Kongsberg, Norway | Long | 8 June | (Sweden) Tove Alexandersson | (Denmark) Ida Bobach | (Norway) Mari Fasting | |
| 9 | Imatra, Finland | Sprint | 11 June | (Switzerland) Judith Wyder | (Denmark) Maja Alm | (Sweden) Tove Alexandersson (Switzerland) Julia Gross (Sweden) Helena Jansson | |
Round 5 - World Championships
| 10 | Venezia, Italy | Sprint (WOC) | 5 July | (Switzerland) Judith Wyder | (Sweden) Tove Alexandersson | (Denmark) Maja Alm | |
| 11 | Trentino, Italy | Long (WOC) | 9 July | (Russia) Svetlana Mironova | (Sweden) Tove Alexandersson | (Switzerland) Judith Wyder | |
| 12 | Trentino, Italy | Middle (WOC) | 11 July | (Sweden) Annika Billstam | (Denmark) Ida Bobach | (Sweden) Tove Alexandersson | |
Round 6 - Finals
| 13 | Liestal, Switzerland | Middle | 4 October | (Denmark) Ida Bobach | (Switzerland) Judith Wyder | (Denmark) Emma Klingenberg | |
| 14 | Liestal, Switzerland | Sprint | 5 October | (Sweden) Tove Alexandersson | (Denmark) Maja Alm | (Switzerland) Judith Wyder | |

== Points distribution ==
The 40 best runners in each event were awarded points. In the final race (WC 14), the runners were awarded a double number of points.

| Rank | 1 | 2 | 3 | 4 | 5 | 6 | 7 | 8 | 9 | 10 | 11 | 12 | 13 | 14 | 15 | 16 | 17 | 18 | 19 | 20 | 21 | 22 | 23 | 24 | 25 | 26 | 27 | 28 | 29 | 30 | 31 | 32 | 33 | 34 | 35 | 36 | 37 | 38 | 39 | 40 |
|---|---|---|---|---|---|---|---|---|---|---|---|---|---|---|---|---|---|---|---|---|---|---|---|---|---|---|---|---|---|---|---|---|---|---|---|---|---|---|---|---|
| Points | 100 | 80 | 60 | 50 | 45 | 40 | 37 | 35 | 33 | 31 | 30 | 29 | 28 | 27 | 26 | 25 | 24 | 23 | 22 | 21 | 20 | 19 | 18 | 17 | 16 | 15 | 14 | 13 | 12 | 11 | 10 | 9 | 8 | 7 | 6 | 5 | 4 | 3 | 2 | 1 |
| Points Final (WC 14) | 200 | 160 | 120 | 100 | 90 | 80 | 74 | 70 | 66 | 62 | 60 | 58 | 56 | 54 | 52 | 50 | 48 | 46 | 44 | 42 | 40 | 38 | 36 | 34 | 32 | 30 | 28 | 26 | 24 | 22 | 20 | 18 | 16 | 14 | 12 | 10 | 8 | 6 | 4 | 2 |

== Overall standings ==
This section shows the final standings after all 14 individual events.

=== Men ===
| Rank | Athlete | Points |
|---|---|---|
| 1 | (Switzerland) Daniel Hubmann | 1058 |
| 2 | (Switzerland) Fabian Hertner | 519 |
| 3 | (Switzerland) Matthias Kyburz | 513 |
| 4 | (Norway) Olav Lundanes | 494 |
| 5 | (Ukraine) Oleksandr Kratov | 437 |
| 6 | (Sweden) Jonas Leandersson | 365 |
| 7 | (Sweden) Gustav Bergman | 347 |
| 8 | (Sweden) Jerker Lysell | 336 |
| 9 | (Denmark) Søren Bobach | 291 |
| 10 | (Norway) Magne Dæhli | 243 |

=== Women ===
| Rank | Athlete | Points |
|---|---|---|
| 1 | (Sweden) Tove Alexandersson | 1026 |
| 2 | (Switzerland) Judith Wyder | 720 |
| 3 | (Denmark) Maja Alm | 506 |
| 4 | (Sweden) Lena Eliasson | 491 |
| 5 | (Denmark) Ida Bobach | 449 |
| 6 | (Sweden) Helena Jansson | 392 |
| 7 | (Ukraine) Nadiya Volynska | 378 |
| 8 | (Switzerland) Julia Gross | 368 |
| 9 | (Switzerland) Sara Lüscher | 308 |
| 9 | (Russia) Svetlana Mironova | 308 |

== Achievements ==
Only individual competitions.
