= European Orienteering Championships =

Sporting competition

- Status: active
- Genre: sports event
- Date: May–June
- Frequency: biannual
- Location: various
- Inaugurated: 1962
- Organiser: IOF

The European Orienteering Championships were first held in 1962. They have been held biennially since 2000 and have been included in the Orienteering World Cup. From 2020, the European Orienteering Championships are held annually, with sprint events and forest events in alternate years.

== Format ==
The competition format has changed several times. From the beginning in 1962, the World Championships consisted of only two competitions: an individual race and an unofficial relay. The relay event was an official event for the first time in the 1964 European Championships. EOC was not arranged from 1964 to 2000. In 2000, a sprint race (roughly 12–15 minutes winning time). In 2002, a short distance race (roughly 20–25 minutes) was added. The middle distance (roughly 30–35 minutes) replaced the short distance in 2004 On IOF's 23rd congress in Lausanne in 2012, it was decided that a sprint relay event would be added in the 2016 European Orienteering Championships in Jeseník, Czech Republic. The sprint relay are competed in urban areas and consists of four-orienteer mixed-gender teams with starting order woman-man-man-woman.

=== Current competition format ===
The current championship events are:

Forest EOC (even years)
Distance	Winning Time	Notes
Long distance	90–100 min	Previously called classic distance
Middle distance	30–35 min	Replaced short distance (20–25 min) in 2004
Relay	3 × 40 min	Three-person teams

Urban EOC (odd years)
Distance	Winning Time	Notes
Sprint	12–15 min	
Knock-out sprint	5–8 min	First held in 2021
Sprint relay	4 × 12–15 min	Four-person teams, two men and two women.

== Editions ==
#	Year	Dates	Host
1	1962	September 22–23	Løten, Norway
2	1964	September 26–27	Le Brassus, Switzerland
Not organised 1966 - 1998 because of World Orienteering Championships
3	2000	June 30 - July 4	Truskavets, Ukraine
4	2002	September 25–30	Sümeg, Hungary
5	2004	July 10–17	Roskilde, Denmark
6	2006	May 7–14	Otepää, Estonia
7	2008	May 25 - June 1	Ventspils, Latvia
8	2010	May 27 - June 6	Primorsko, Bulgaria
9	2012	May 14 - May 20	Falun, Sweden
10	2014	April 9–16	Palmela, Portugal
11	2016	May 25–31	Jeseník, Czech Republic
12	2018	May 5–12	Ticino, Switzerland
-	~~2020~~	~~August 16–23~~	~~Rakvere, Estonia~~
13	2021	May 13–16	Neuchâtel, Switzerland
14	2022	August 1 - 7	Rakvere, Estonia
15	2023	October 4 - 8	Verona, Italy
16	2024	August 15 - 20	Mór, Hungary
17	2025	August 20 - 24	Hasselt, Belgium
17	2026	September 22-28	Druskininkai, Lithuania

== Medals (1962-2022) ==
Rank	Country	Gold	Silver	Bronze	Total
1	Switzerland	36	24	13	73
2	Sweden	28	22	24	74
3	Norway	12	14	16	42
4	Finland	12	8	14	34
5	Russia	8	7	12	27
6	France	3	3	5	11
7	Denmark	1	4	6	11
8	Czech Republic	–	4	1	5
8	Ukraine	–	4	1	5
10	Latvia	–	2	–	2
11	United Kingdom	–	1	5	6
12	Estonia	–	1	1	2
12	Lithuania	–	1	1	2
14	Belgium	–	1	–	1
14	Bulgaria	–	1	–	1
14	Slovakia	–	1	–	1
17	Austria	–	–	1	1
17	Poland	–	–	1	1

== Individual/Classic/Long ==
=== Men ===
Year	Gold	Silver	Bronze	Notes
1962	(Norway) Magne Lystad	(Sweden) Bertil Norman	(Sweden) Sivar Nordström	16.5 km, 13 controls (individual event)
1964	(Finland) Erkki Kohvakka	(Switzerland) Alex Schwager	(Finland) Aimo Tepsell	15.0 km, 15 controls (individual event)
2000	(Russia) Valentin Novikov	(Slovakia) Marián Dávidík	(Norway) Bjørnar Valstad	Classic distance
2002	(Switzerland) Thomas Bührer	(Norway) Bjørnar Valstad	(Sweden) Emil Wingstedt	12.4 km, 23 controls
2004	(Sweden) Kalle Dalin	(Finland) Mats Haldin	(Sweden) Emil Wingstedt	14.5 km, 29 controls
2006	(Finland) Jani Lakanen	(Switzerland) Daniel Hubmann	(Estonia) Olle Kärner	16.21 km, 33 controls
2008	(Russia) Dmitry Tsvetkov	(Switzerland) Daniel Hubmann	(Sweden) Emil Wingstedt	16.9 km, 33 controls
2010	(Switzerland) Daniel Hubmann	(France) Philippe Adamski	(Switzerland) Fabian Hertner	17.3 km, 30 controls
2012	(Norway) Olav Lundanes	(Switzerland) Matthias Merz	(Russia) Valentin Novikov	15.36 km, 33 controls
2014	(Switzerland) Daniel Hubmann	(Norway) Olav Lundanes	(Sweden) Fredrik Johansson	20.3 km, 30 controls
2016	(Switzerland) Daniel Hubmann	(Norway) Magne Daehli	(Sweden) Martin Regborn	16.1 km, 23 controls
2018	(Norway) Olav Lundanes	(Switzerland) Matthias Kyburz	(Austria) Gernot Kerschbaumer	14.9 km
2022	(Sweden) Martin Regborn	(Norway) Eskil Kinneberg	(Finland) Elias Kuukka	17.29 km, 31 controls
2024	(Norway) Kasper Fosser	(Switzerland) Daniel Hubmann	(Finland) Miika Kirmula	13.9 km, 25 controls
2026	(Norway) Kasper Harlem Fosser	(Switzerland) Fabian Aebersold	(Sweden) Viktor Svensk	16.9km,27 controls

=== Women ===
Year	Gold	Silver	Bronze	Notes
1962	(Sweden) Ulla Lindkvist	(Norway) Marit Økern	(Sweden) Emy Gauffin	7.5 km, 7 controls (individual event)
1964	(Switzerland) Margrit Thommen	(Sweden) Ann-Marie Wallsten	(Sweden) Ulla Lindkvist	8.1 km, 10 controls (individual event)
2000	(Norway) Hanne Staff	(Switzerland) Brigitte Wolf	(United Kingdom) Yvette Baker	Classic distance
2002	(Switzerland) Simone Niggli-Luder	(Norway) Hanne Staff	(Norway) Birgitte Husebye	6.7 km, 17 controls
2004	(Switzerland) Simone Niggli-Luder	(Sweden) Emma Engstrand	(Russia) Tatiana Ryabkina	9.6 km, 21 controls
2006	(Switzerland) Simone Niggli-Luder	(Finland) Heli Jukkola	(Finland) Minna Kauppi	10.93 km, 25 controls
2008	(Norway) Anne Margrethe Hausken	(Russia) Tatiana Ryabkina	(Sweden) Emma Engstrand	11.0 km, 24 controls
2010	(Switzerland) Simone Niggli-Luder	(Czech Republic) Dana Brožková	(Sweden) Helena Jansson	11.0 km, 26 controls
2012	(Switzerland) Simone Niggli-Luder	(Russia) Tatiana Ryabkina	(Finland) Minna Kauppi	9.76 km, 24 controls
2014	(Switzerland) Judith Wyder	(Russia) Svetlana Mironova	(United Kingdom) Catherine Taylor	13.3 km, 23 controls
2016	(Sweden) Tove Alexandersson	(Norway) Anne Margrethe Hausken	(Russia) Svetlana Mironova	10.3 km, 15 controls
2018	(Sweden) Tove Alexandersson	(Russia) Natalia Gemperle	(Switzerland) Julia Gross	11.3 km
2022	(Finland) Venla Harju	(Sweden) Tove Alexandersson	(Finland) Marika Teini	12.93 km, 20 controls
2024	(Sweden) Tove Alexandersson	(Switzerland) Simona Aebersold	(Norway) Andrine Benjaminsen	10.8 km, 22 controls
2026	(Sweden) Tove Alexandersson	(Switzerland) Simona Aebersold	(Sweden) Sanna Fast	13.7 km, 25 controls

== Middle ==
=== Men ===
Year	Gold	Silver	Bronze	Notes
2002	(Russia) Michael Mamleev	(Ukraine) Yuri Omeltchenko	(United Kingdom) Jamie Stevenson	5.2 km, 15 controls
2004	(France) Thierry Gueorgiou	(Finland) Jarkko Huovila	(Sweden) Emil Wingstedt	6.4 km, 22 controls
2006	(France) Thierry Gueorgiou	(Latvia) Martins Sirmais	(Russia) Valentin Novikov	6.7 km, 18 controls
2008	(France) Thierry Gueorgiou	(Latvia) Martins Sirmais	(Finland) Pasi Ikonen	6.7 km, 22 controls
2010	(Russia) Valentin Novikov	(Switzerland) Matthias Merz	(Switzerland) Daniel Hubmann	6.4 km, 22 controls
2012	(Norway) Olav Lundanes	(Russia) Valentin Novikov	(Norway) Carl Waaler Kaas	6.24 km, 23 controls
2014	(Switzerland) Daniel Hubmann	(Switzerland) Fabian Hertner	(France) Thierry Gueorgiou	7.9 km, 22 controls
2016	(Switzerland) Matthias Kyburz	(Sweden) Gustav Bergman	(France) Lucas Basset	5.7 km, 24 controls
2018	(Switzerland) Matthias Kyburz	(Switzerland) Florian Howald	(Norway) Olav Lundanes	5.4 km, 19 controls
2022	(Sweden) Albin Ridefelt	(Sweden) Anton Johansson	(Sweden) Gustav Bergman	6.3 km, 22 controls
2024	(Norway) Eirik Langedal Breivik	(Norway) Kasper Fosser	(Sweden) Albin Ridefelt	5.1 km, 22 controls
2026	(Norway) Kasper Harlem Fosser	(Sweden) Anton Johansson	(Switzerland) Fabian Aebersold	6.5 km, 23 controls

=== Women ===
Year	Gold	Silver	Bronze	Notes
2002	(Sweden) Gunilla Svärd	(Switzerland) Brigitte Wolf	(Norway) Birgitte Husebye	4.5 km, 13 controls
2004	(Norway) Hanne Staff	(Lithuania) Dainora Alšauskaitė	(Russia) Tatiana Ryabkina	5.3 km, 21 controls
2006	(Finland) Minna Kauppi	(Norway) Marianne Andersen	(Finland) Heli Jukkola	5.679 km, 15 controls
2008	(Finland) Heli Jukkola	(Finland) Merja Rantanen	(Finland) Minna Kauppi	5.2 km, 16 controls
2010	(Switzerland) Simone Niggli-Luder	(Denmark) Signe Soes	(Sweden) Lena Eliasson	5.4 km, 22 controls
2012	(Switzerland) Simone Niggli-Luder	(Finland) Minna Kauppi	(Russia) Tatiana Ryabkina	5.19 km, 18 controls
2014	(Denmark) Signe Søes	(Denmark) Maja Alm	(Sweden) Tove Alexandersson	6.4 km, 17 controls
2016	(Sweden) Tove Alexandersson	(Switzerland) Judith Wyder	(Finland) Marika Teini	5.0 km, 21 controls
2018	(Finland) Marika Teini	(Sweden) Tove Alexandersson	(Switzerland) Simona Aebersold	4.3 km, 16 controls
2022	(Switzerland) Simona Aebersold	(Estonia) Evely Kaasiku	(Finland) Venla Harju	5.3 km, 20 controls
2024	(Switzerland) Simona Aebersold	(Switzerland) Natalia Gemperle	(Norway) Andrine Benjaminsen	4.5 km, 19 controls
2026	(Sweden) Hanna Lundberg	(Norway) Pia Young Vik	(Finland) Venla Harju	5.5 km, 22 controls

== Short/Sprint ==
=== Men ===
Year	Gold	Silver	Bronze	Notes
2000	(Russia) Valentin Novikov	(Ukraine) Yuri Omeltchenko	(Norway) Tore Sandvik	Short distance
2002	(Sweden) Emil Wingstedt	(Sweden) Håkan Pettersson	(Ukraine) Yuri Omeltchenko	3.2 km, 10 controls
2004	(Sweden) Emil Wingstedt	(Russia) Andrey Khramov	(Finland) Mårten Boström	3.0 km, 20 controls
2006	(Sweden) Emil Wingstedt	(United Kingdom) Jamie Stevenson	(Russia) Andrey Khramov	3.07 km, 17 controls
2008	(Sweden) Emil Wingstedt	(Switzerland) Daniel Hubmann	(Russia) Andrey Khramov	3.3 km, 19 controls
2010	(Switzerland) Fabian Hertner	(Switzerland) Daniel Hubmann	(Sweden) Emil Wingstedt	3.3 km, 24 controls
2012	(Sweden) Jonas Leandersson	(Bulgaria) Kiril Nikolov	(Sweden) Jerker Lysell (Switzerland) Daniel Hubmann	3.54 km, 20 controls
2014	(Sweden) Jonas Leandersson	(Sweden) Jerker Lysell	(Switzerland) Martin Hubmann	2.8 km, 22 controls
2016	(Switzerland) Matthias Kyburz	(Sweden) Gustav Bergman	(Switzerland) Florian Howald	3.4 km, 22 controls
2018	(Switzerland) Matthias Kyburz (Switzerland) Daniel Hubmann		(United Kingdom) Kristian Jones	4.2 km, 27 controls
2021	(Sweden) Emil Svensk	(Belgium) Yannick Michiels	(Sweden) Gustav Bergman	4.4 km, 25 controls
2023	(Switzerland) Matthias Kyburz	(Norway) Kasper Fosser	(Finland) Tuomas Heikkila	3.5 km, 21 controls
2025	(France) Mathias Barros Vallet	(Norway) Kasper Fosser	(Norway) Eirik Langedal Breivik	4.1 km, 21 controls

=== Women ===
Year	Gold	Silver	Bronze	Notes
2000	(Sweden) Jenny Johansson	(Switzerland) Simone Luder	(Poland) Anna Górnicka-Antonowicz	Short distance
2002	(Switzerland) Vroni König-Salmi	(Norway) Elisabeth Ingvaldsen	(Norway) Anne Margrethe Hausken	2.85 km, 11 controls
2004	(Switzerland) Simone Niggli-Luder	(Sweden) Jenny Johansson	(Sweden) Emma Engstrand	2.5 km, 16 controls
2006	(Switzerland) Simone Niggli-Luder	(Norway) Marianne Andersen	(Finland) Minna Kauppi	2.73 km, 14 controls
2008	(Norway) Anne Margrethe Hausken	(Finland) Heli Jukkola	(Sweden) Helena Jansson	2.5 km, 14 controls
2010	(Sweden) Helena Jansson	(Switzerland) Simone Niggli-Luder	(Denmark) Maja Alm	2.8 km, 21 controls
2012	(Switzerland) Simone Niggli-Luder	(Sweden) Lena Eliasson	(Denmark) Maja Alm	3.21 km, 16 controls
2014	(Switzerland) Judith Wyder	(Ukraine) Nadiya Volynska	(Switzerland) Julia Gross	2.3 km, 19 controls
2016	(Switzerland) Judith Wyder	(Ukraine) Nadiya Volynska	(Denmark) Maja Alm (Russia) Galina Vinogradova	3.0 km, 18 controls
2018	(Sweden) Tove Alexandersson	(Switzerland) Judith Wyder	(Russia) Natalia Gemperle	3.8 km, 23 controls
2021	(Sweden) Tove Alexandersson	(Switzerland) Elena Roos	(Switzerland) Simona Aebersold	4.0 km, 21 controls
2023	(Sweden) Sara Hagström	(Sweden) Tove Alexandersson	(Switzerland) Simona Aebersold	3.0 km, 19 controls
2025	(Norway) Pia Young Vik	(Sweden) Hanna Lundberg	(Finland) Inka Nurminen	3.6 km, 18 controls

== Knock Out Sprint (2021-) ==
=== Men ===
Year	Gold	Silver	Bronze	Notes
2021	(Switzerland) Matthias Kyburz	(Switzerland) Joey Hadorn	(Norway) Kasper Fosser	1.7km, 50m climb, 13 controls
2023	(Switzerland) Matthias Kyburz	(Sweden) Jonatan Gustafsson	(Sweden) Emil Svensk	1.9 km
2025	(Sweden) August Mollen	(Sweden) Jonatan Gustafsson	(Finland) Akseli Ruohola	2.3 km, 7 starting competitors

=== Women ===
Year	Gold	Silver	Bronze	Notes
2021	(Sweden) Tove Alexandersson	(Switzerland) Simona Aebersold	(Norway) Andrine Benjaminsen	1.7km, 50m climb, 13 controls
2023	(Sweden) Tove Alexandersson	(Switzerland) Elena Roos	(Switzerland) Natalia Gemperle	1.9 km
2025	(France) Cecile Calandry	(Norway) Pia Young Vik	(Switzerland) Simona Aebersold	2.3 km

== Relay ==
=== Men ===
Year	Gold	Silver	Bronze
1962	(Finland) Finland; Aimo Tepsell; Esko Vainio; Rolf Koskinen; Erkki Kohvakka	(Sweden) Sweden; Bertil Norman; Per-Olof Skogum; Sven Gustafsson; Halvard Nilsson	(Norway) Norway; Per Kristiansen; Ola Skarholt; Knut Berglia; Magne Lystad
1964	(Finland) Finland; Juhani Salmenkylä; Rolf Koskinen; Aimo Tepsell; Erkki Kohvakka	(Norway) Norway; Ola Skarholt; Per Kristiansen; Magne Lystad; Stig Berge	(Sweden) Sweden; Sven-Olof Åsberg; Sven Gustavsson; Bertil Norman; Pontus Carlson
2000	(Switzerland) Switzerland; Matthias Niggli; Christoph Platner; Thomas Bührer	(Czech Republic) Czech Republic; Vladimír Lučan; Michal Jedlička; Rudolf Ropek	(Sweden) Sweden; Fredrik Löwegren; Thomas Asp; Jörgen Olsson
2002	(Finland) Finland; Jani Lakanen; Pasi Ikonen; Mats Haldin	(Sweden) Sweden; Johan Näsman; Fredrik Löwegren; Emil Wingstedt	(Denmark) Denmark; Mikkel Lund; René Rokkjær; Carsten Jørgensen
2004	(Finland) Finland; Jarkko Huovila; Pasi Ikonen; Mats Haldin	(Denmark) Denmark; Chris Terkelsen; René Rokkjær; Carsten Jørgensen	(Sweden) Sweden; Kalle Dalin; Johan Modig; Emil Wingstedt
2006	(Sweden) Sweden; Niclas Jonasson; Peter Öberg; David Andersson	(France) France; Francois Gonon; Damien Renard; Thierry Gueorgiou	(Norway) Norway; Lars Skjeset; Carl Waaler Kaas; Øystein Kvaal Østerbø
2008	(Russia) Russia; Dmitry Tsvetkov; Andrey Khramov; Valentin Novikov	(Switzerland) Switzerland; Baptiste Rollier; Matthias Merz; Daniel Hubmann	(Finland) Finland; Jarkko Huovila; Pasi Ikonen; Mats Haldin
2010	(Switzerland) Switzerland; Matthias Müller; Fabian Hertner; Matthias Merz	(France) France; Frédéric Tranchand; Philippe Adamski; Thierry Gueorgiou	(Norway) Norway; Holger Hott; Carl Waaler Kaas; Olav Lundanes
2012	(Switzerland) Switzerland; Martin Hubmann; Matthias Müller; Matthias Kyburz	(Sweden) Sweden; Jonas Leandersson; Fredrik Johansson; Anders Holmberg	(France) France; Frédéric Tranchand; Philippe Adamski; François Gonon
2014	(Sweden) Sweden; Jonas Leandersson; Fredrik Johansson; Gustav Bergman	(Czech Republic) Czech Republic; Jan Petržela; Vojtěch Král; Jan Prochazka	(France) France; Frédéric Tranchand; Lucas Basset; Thierry Gueorgiou
2016	(Switzerland) Switzerland; Martin Hubmann; Florian Howald; Baptiste Rollier	(Norway) Norway; Carl Godager Kaas; Magne Daehli; Eskil Kinneberg	(Czech Republic) Czech Republic; Vojtěch Král; Jan Petrzela; Jan Sedivy
2018	(Norway) Norway; Eskil Kinneberg; Magne Daehli; Olav Lundanes	(Switzerland) Switzerland; Florian Howald; Matthias Kyburz; Daniel Hubmann	(France) France; Nicolas Rio; Lucas Basset; Frederic Tranchand
2022	(Norway) Norway; Magne Daehli; Kasper Harlem Fosser; Eskil Kinneberg	(Sweden) Sweden; Viktor Svensk; Isac von Krusenstierna; Max Peter Bejmer	(Switzerland) Switzerland; Daniel Hubmann; Florian Howald; Matthias Kyburz
2024	(Norway) Norway; Eskil Kinneberg; Eirik Langedal Breivik; Kasper Harlem Fosser	(Sweden) Sweden; Viktor Svensk; Albin Ridefelt; Emil Svensk	(Switzerland) Switzerland; Daniel Hubmann; Fabian Aebersold; Joey Hadorn
2026	Switzerland; Daniel Hubmann; Matthieu Buehrer; Fabian Aebersold	Norway; Lukas Liland; Eirik Langedal Breivik; Kasper Harlem Fosser	Sweden; Simon Imark; Simon Hector; Emil Svensk

=== Women ===
Year	Gold	Silver	Bronze
1962	(Sweden) Sweden; Siri Lundkvist; Emy Gauffin; Ulla Lindkvist	(Norway) Norway; Lillis Kielland; Babben Enger; Marit Økern	(Switzerland) Switzerland; Margrit Thommen; Sonja Ballestad; Käthi von Salis
1964	(Sweden) Sweden; Ann-Marie Wallsten; Eivor Steen-Olsson; Ulla Lindkvist	(Switzerland) Switzerland; Käthi von Salis; Marlies Saxer; Margrit Thommen	(Denmark) Denmark; Ellen Berg; Bodil Jakobsen; Karin Agesen
2000	(Norway) Norway; Elisabeth Ingvaldsen; Birgitte Husebye; Hanne Staff	(Sweden) Sweden; Katarina Allberg; Maria Sandström; Jenny Johansson	(United Kingdom) Great Britain; Jenny James; Yvette Baker; Heather Monro
2002	(Norway) Norway; Elisabeth Ingvaldsen; Birgitte Husebye; Hanne Staff	(Switzerland) Switzerland; Brigitte Wolf; Vroni König-Salmi; Simone Niggli-Luder	(Lithuania) Lithuania; Giedre Voveriene; Vilma Rudzenskaite; Ieva Sargautyte
2004	(Sweden) Sweden; Karolina Arewång-Höjsgaard; Jenny Johansson; Gunilla Svärd	(Norway) Norway; Marianne Andersen; Elisabeth Ingvaldsen; Hanne Staff	(Russia) Russia; Natalia Korzhova; Olga Belozerova; Tatiana Ryabkina
2006	(Finland) Finland; Paula Haapakoski; Heli Jukkola; Minna Kauppi	(Switzerland) Switzerland; Lea Müller; Vroni König-Salmi; Simone Niggli	(Sweden) Sweden; Emma Engstrand; Kajsa Nilsson; Karolina Arewång-Höjsgaard
2008	(Sweden) Sweden; Lina Persson; Emma Engstrand; Helena Jansson	(Russia) Russia; Natalia Korzhova; Yulia Novikova; Tatiana Ryabkina	(Finland) Finland; Katri Lindeqvist; Merja Rantanen; Minna Kauppi
2010	(Sweden) Sweden; Karolina A-Höjsgaard; Lena Eliasson; Helena Jansson	(Finland) Finland; Merja Rantanen; Anni-Maija Fincke; Minna Kauppi	(Switzerland) Switzerland; Vroni König-Salmi; Caroline Cejka; Simone Niggli-Luder
2012	(Russia) Russia; Natalia Efimova; Svetlana Mironova; Tatiana Ryabkina	(Finland) Finland; Sofia Haajanen; Merja Rantanen; Minna Kauppi	(Sweden) Sweden; Annika Billstam; Lina Strand; Tove Alexandersson
2014	(Switzerland) Switzerland; Julia Gross; Sabine Hauswirth; Judith Wyder	(Sweden) Sweden; Lilian Forsgren; Karolin Ohlsson; Alva Olsson	(Russia) Russia; Julia Novikova; Irina Nyberg; Natalia Gemperle
2016	(Finland) Finland; Sari Anttonen; Marika Teini; Merja Rantanen	(Sweden) Sweden; Lina Strand; Emma Johansson; Tove Alexandersson	(Russia) Russia; Anastasia Rudnaya; Natalia Gemperle; Svetlana Mironova
2018	(Switzerland) Switzerland; Judith Wyder; Elena Roos; Julia Gross	(Sweden) Sweden; Lina Strand; Sara Hagström; Karolin Ohlsson	(Denmark) Denmark; Cecilie Klysner; Ida Bobach; Maja Alm
2022	(Sweden) Sweden; Lina Strand; Sara Hagström; Tove Alexandersson	(Czech Republic) Czech Republic; Vendula Horčičková; Adéla Finstrlová; Tereza Janošíková	(Norway) Norway; Ane Dyrkorn; Marie Olaussen; Andrine Benjaminsen
2024	(Switzerland) Switzerland; Ines Berger; Natalia Gemperle; Simona Aebersold	(Norway) Norway; Kamilla Steiwer; Marie Olaussen; Andrine Benjaminsen	(Sweden) Sweden; Johanna Ridefelt; Hanna Lundberg; Tove Alexandersson
2026	(Sweden) Sweden; Hanna Lundberg; Sanna Fast; Tove Alexandersson	Switzerland; Sofie Bachmann; Natalia Gemperle; Simona Aebersold	Finland; Eeva Liina Ojanaho; Hanne Hilo; Ida Haapala

=== Sprint relay ===
Year	Gold	Silver	Bronze	Notes
2016	(Russia) Russia; Natalia Gemperle; Gleb Tikhonov; Andrey Khramov; Galina Vinogradova	(Denmark) Denmark; Cecilie Klysner; Tue Lassen; Søren Bobach; Maja Alm	(Switzerland) Switzerland; Judith Wyder; Andreas Kyburz; Martin Hubmann; Rahel Friederich	
2018	(Switzerland) Switzerland; Judith Wyder; Florian Howald; Martin Hubmann; Elena Roos	(Sweden) Sweden; Lina Strand; Emil Svensk; Jonas Leandersson; Karolin Ohlsson	(Norway) Norway; Sigrid Alexandersen; Trond Einar Moen Pedersli; Øystein Kvaal Østerbø; Andrine Benjaminsen	
2021	(Switzerland) Switzerland; Simona Aebersold; Joey Hadorn; Matthias Kyburz; Elena Roos	(Sweden) Sweden; Lina Strand; Gustav Bergman; Emil Svensk; Sara Hagstrom	(Norway) Norway; Victoria Haestad Bjornstad; Eskil Kinneberg; Kasper Harlem Fosser; Andrine Benjaminsen	
2023	(Sweden) Sweden; Tove Alexandersson; Jonatan Gustafsson; Martin Regborn; Sara Hagstrom	(Switzerland) Switzerland; Simona Aebersold; Joey Hadorn; Matthias Kyburz; Elena Roos	Finland; Inka Nurminen; Teemu Oksanen; Tuomas Heikkilä; Venla Harju	
2025	(Norway) Norway; Victoria Haestad Bjornstad; Eirik Langedal Breivik; Kasper Harlem Fosser; Andrine Benjaminsen	(Switzerland) Switzerland; Natalia Gemperle; Riccardo Rancan; Joey Hadorn; Simona Aebersold	(Finland) Sweden; Alva Sonesson; Jonatan Gustafsson; Martin Regborn; Hanna Lundberg	

== See also ==
- World Orienteering Championships
- Junior World Orienteering Championships
- European Youth Orienteering Championships
- European University Orienteering Championships
- Asian Orienteering Championships

== External links and references ==
- European Orienteering Championships, senior statistics 1962-2004
- EOC 2006 Statistics
- EOC 2006 Official site
- EOC 2008 Official site
- EOC 2010 Official site
- EOC 2012 Official site
- EOC 2014 Official site
- EOC 2016 Official site
- EOC 2018 Official site
- EOC 2020 in IOF Eventor
- EOC 2021 in IOF Eventor
- EOC 2023 in IOF Eventor
- EOC 2024 in IOF Eventor
- EOC 2025 in IOF Eventor
- Hungarian orienteers on the European Championships (9 June 2008)
