= Lina Persson =

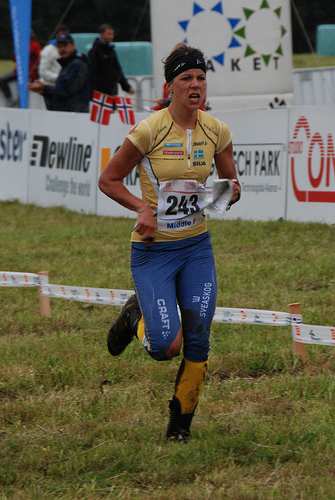
- Lina Persson at WOC 2008

Medal record

Women's orienteering

Representing Sweden

European Championships
Gold medal – first place	2008 Ventspils	Relay

Junior World Championships
Bronze medal – third place	2002 Alicante	Relay

Lina Persson (born February 3, 1982) is a Swedish orienteering competitor and European champion. She received a gold medal in the relay event at the 2008 European Orienteering Championships in Ventspils, together with Emma Engstrand and Helena Jansson. She qualified for the finals and finished 10th in the long distance and 12th in the middle distance at the 2008 European championships.
