= Trond Einar Moen Pedersli =

Norwegian orienteer (born 1994)

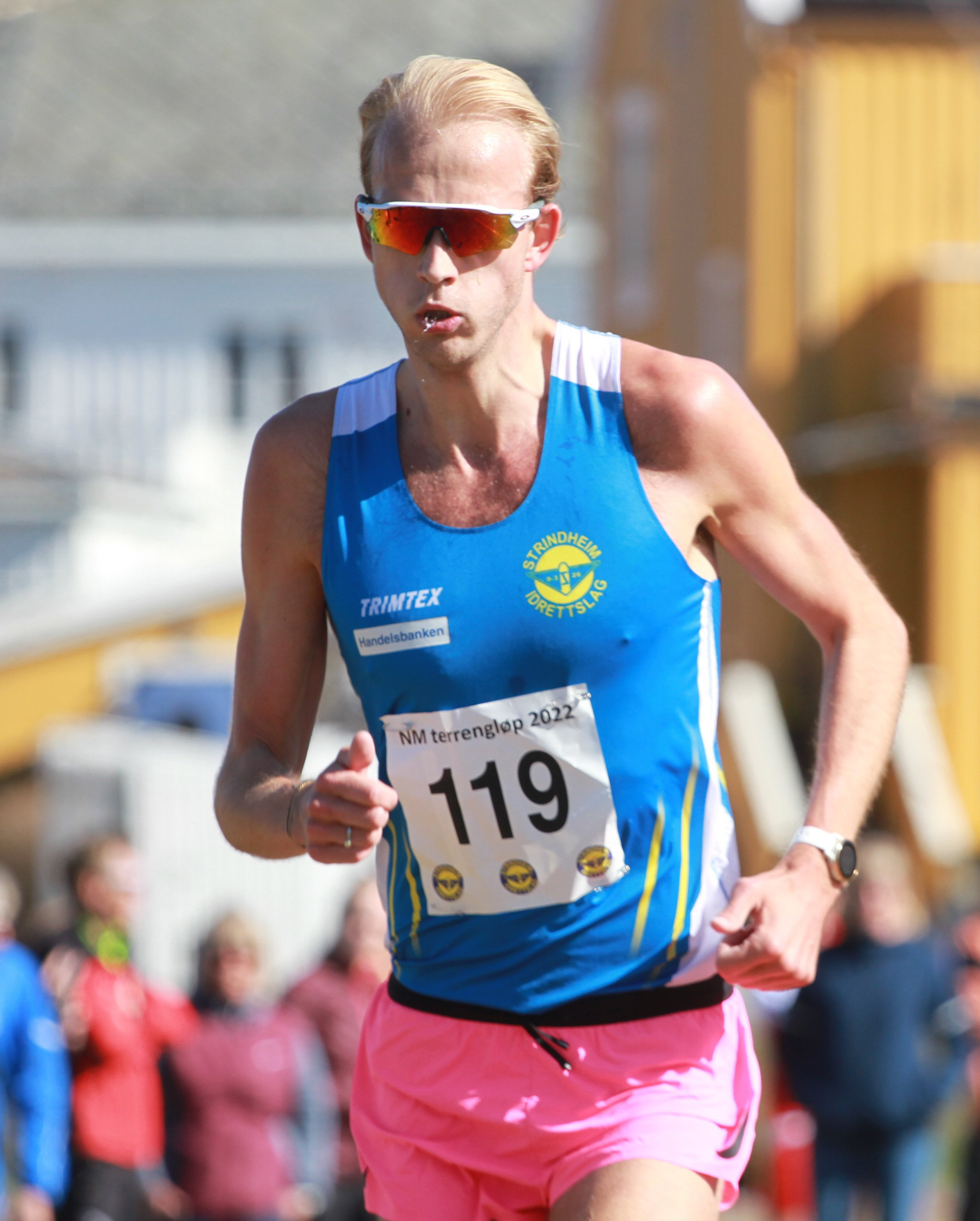
- Trond Einar Moen Pedersli

Personal information
- Born: 21 February 1994 (age 32) Trondheim

Sport
- Sport: Orienteering
- Club: OL Trollelg
Medal record
Men's orienteering
Representing Norway
European Championships
Bronze medal – third place	2018 Cadempino	Sprint relay

Trond Einar Moen Pedersli (born 21 February 1994) is a Norwegian orienteering competitor. He was born in Trondheim. At the 2018 European Orienteering Championships in Cadempino he won a bronze medal in the sprint relay with the Norwegian team. He competed at the 2018 World Orienteering Championships in Latvia, where he qualified for the sprint final, placing 23rd.

As a track athlete representing Strindheim IL, he placed 8th in 5000 metres at the 2017 Norwegian Championships.
