= Sirmais =

Family name

Origin
- Origin: Latvian
- Meaning: "grey-hair"

Sirmais (feminine: Sirmā) is a Latvian surname, derived from the Latvian word for "gray" (sirms). Individuals with the surname include:

- Justs Sirmais (born 1995), Latvian singer
- Mārtiņš Sirmais (born 1982), Latvian orienteering competitor
- Zigismunds Sirmais (born 1992), Latvian javelin thrower
