= Håkan Pettersson =

Håkan Pettersson may refer to:

- Håkan Pettersson (ice hockey) (1949–2008), Swedish professional ice hockey player
- Håkan Pettersson (Swedish Air Force officer) (born 1947), Swedish Air Force major general
- Håkan Pettersson (orienteer), Swedish orienteering competitor
