= Anne Margrethe Hausken =

Norwegian orienteer (born 1976)

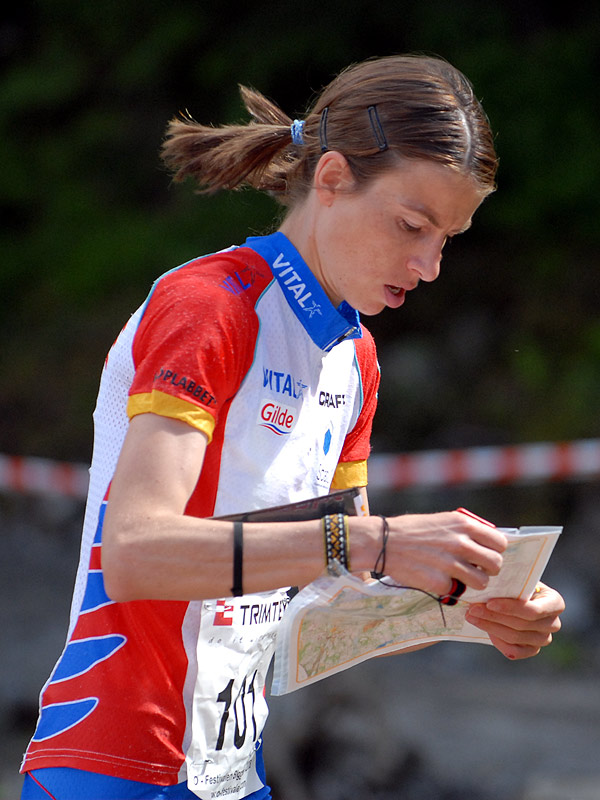
- Hausken in 2008

Personal information
- Nationality: Norwegian
- Born: 23 January 1976 (age 50) Haugesund, Norway

Sport
- Sport: Orienteering; Ski orienteering
- Club: Torvastad IL; Bækkelagets SK; Nydalens SK
Medal record
Representing Norway
Women's orienteering
World Championships
Gold medal – first place	2008 Olomouc	Sprint
Gold medal – first place	2009 Miskolc	Relay
Gold medal – first place	2013 Vuokatti	Relay
Silver medal – second place	2005 Aichi	Sprint
Silver medal – second place	2005 Aichi	Relay
Silver medal – second place	2010 Trondheim	Relay
Silver medal – second place	2015 Inverness	Sprint Relay
Silver medal – second place	2015 Inverness	Relay
Bronze medal – third place	2007 Kyiv	Relay
Bronze medal – third place	2012 Lausanne	Relay
Bronze medal – third place	2016 Stromstad	Long
World Games
Silver medal – second place	2013 Cali	Sprint
World Cup
Gold medal – first place	2008	WC Overall
Bronze medal – third place	2005	WC Overall
European Championships
Gold medal – first place	2008 Ventspils	Long
Gold medal – first place	2008 Ventspils	Sprint
Bronze medal – third place	2002 Sümeg	Sprint
Women's ski-orienteering
Junior World Championships
Gold medal – first place	1996 Banská Bystrica/Donovaly	Relay
Silver medal – second place	1996 Banská Bystrica/Donovaly	Classic distance

Anne Margrethe Hausken Nordberg (born 23 January 1976) is a Norwegian orienteering competitor, World champion and European champion. She took the overall victory in the 2008 World Cup.

== World championships ==
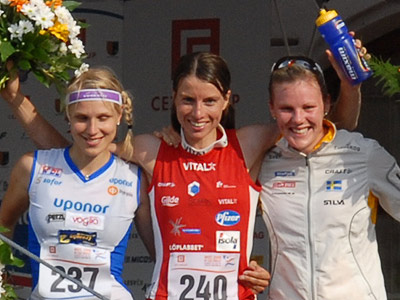
Medalists at the WOC 2008 Sprint distance: Kauppi (silver), Hausken (gold), Jansson (bronze). The same three also topped the overall World Cup in 2008

Hausken finished second in sprint at the 2005 World Orienteering Championships in Aichi, behind Simone Niggli-Luder. She received a silver medal in the relay event at the 2005 World Championships (with Marianne Andersen and Marianne Riddervold), and a bronze medal in 2007 (with Ingunn Hultgreen Weltzien and Marianne Andersen). At the 2008 World Championships in Olomouc she received a gold medal in the Sprint event, before Minna Kauppi and Helena Jansson. This was Hausken's first gold medal at the world championships.

She finished third in the Overall World Cup 2005, and first in 2008.

== European championships ==
Hausken had great success in the 2008 European Orienteering Championships in Ventspils, where she won two individual gold medals. In the sprint distance (2.5 km) she defeated Heli Jukkola by a margin of only 3 seconds. In the long distance (11 km) she finished first with Tatiana Ryabkina on second and Emma Engstrand third place. She has a bronze medal in sprint from the 2002 championships in Sümeg.

== World cup 2008 ==
With the two victories from Ventspils, Hausken got a flying start in the World Cup in 2008. In the next event, the middle distance at the O-festivalen in Siggerud, she again finished first. This was her first major win in the middle course. The next day's long distance was a pursuit race where she was passed by Minna Kauppi but finished second, only a few seconds behind Kauppi. With 417 points and victories in three of the first five races she was ranked first in the WC 2008. Further five wins secured her the overall victory in the 2008 World Cup, with a total of 917 points. Behind her came Minna Kauppi, second with 747 points, and Helena Jansson, overall third with 430 points.

== Clubs and career ==
Hausken, grown up in Karmøy Municipality, has represented her "home" club Torvastad IL, and later Bækkelagets SK. After suffering from overtraining, she abandoned training for two years (1999 and 2000), but returned to the sport in 2001. She currently competes for Nydalens SK.

== Ski orienteering ==
Hausken was Junior world champion in ski-orienteering in relay in 1996 together with Kristin Tolstad Uggen and Stine Hjermstad Kirkevik, and received an individual silver medal in the classic distance.

== Academic career ==
In 2011 Hausken defended her doctorate thesis, Epidemiology of anxiolytic and hypnotic drug use in the general population in Norway.
