= Per Kristiansen =

Norwegian orienteer

Medal record

Men's orienteering

Representing Norway

European Championships
Silver medal – second place	1964 Le Brassus	Relay

Per Kristiansen is a former Norwegian orienteering competitor who competed in the 1950s and 1960s, and later served as an official for the sport at a national level. He became National Champion both individually and in relay, and was twice the individual medal winner at the Scandinavian Championships. He participated at the two first European Orienteering Championships, with a silver medal in relay as his best result.

== Career ==
=== Active career ===
Kristiansen won a bronze medal in the individual contest at the Norwegian Championships in 1956, and another bronze medal in 1957. He participated at the 1957 Nordic Championships, where he won a bronze medal in the individual contest. He was Norwegian Champion in relay in 1960 with the club IF Vestheim. In 1961 he became Norwegian Champion by winning the individual contest, beating Magne Lystad. In 1962 he participated in the winning relay team at the national championships for the second time. He competed at the very first European championships in Løten, Norway, in 1962, where he placed fifteenth in the individual contest, and received a bronze medal in the relay (which was not part of the official championship). In 1963 he won a bronze medal at the Nordic Championships in Karlstad. He received a silver medal in the relay event at the European Orienteering Championships in 1964 in Le Brassus, together with Ola Skarholt, Magne Lystad and Stig Berge. He also competed in the individual contest, where he placed fifteenth.

=== Administrative career ===
Kristiansen chaired the training committee of Norges Orienteringsforbund for six years, from 1967 to 1973. During this period the Norwegian orienteering team produced gold winners at the World Championships in both 1968, 1970 and 1972. The most successful year was 1970 in Friedrichroda, when the team won three of the four possible gold medals, plus two bronze medals. Kristiansen co-wrote manuals and reports on the orienteering sport, such as a handbook on training and competition advice from 1968, and a report on psychological factors in orienteering from 1972. He was strongly involved in the World Championships at Kongsberg in 1978, being on the organizing committee. Experiences from this arrangement were basis for a booklet on the control function during the planning and execution of a competition, published in 1982.

== Bibliography ==
- 1968: Trenings- og konkurranseråd (co-author)
- 1972: Psykiske faktorer ved o-løp (Report; with Helge Kvaase)
- 1982: Kontroll av orienteringsløp (with Knut Berglia and Torbjørn Børve)
