= Wallsten =

Wallsten is a surname of Swedish origin. Notable people with the surname include:

- Ann-Marie Wallsten (born 1943), Swedish orienteering competitor
- Peter Wallsten (fl. 1994–present), American journalist and author
