= Frédéric Tranchand =

French orienteering competitor

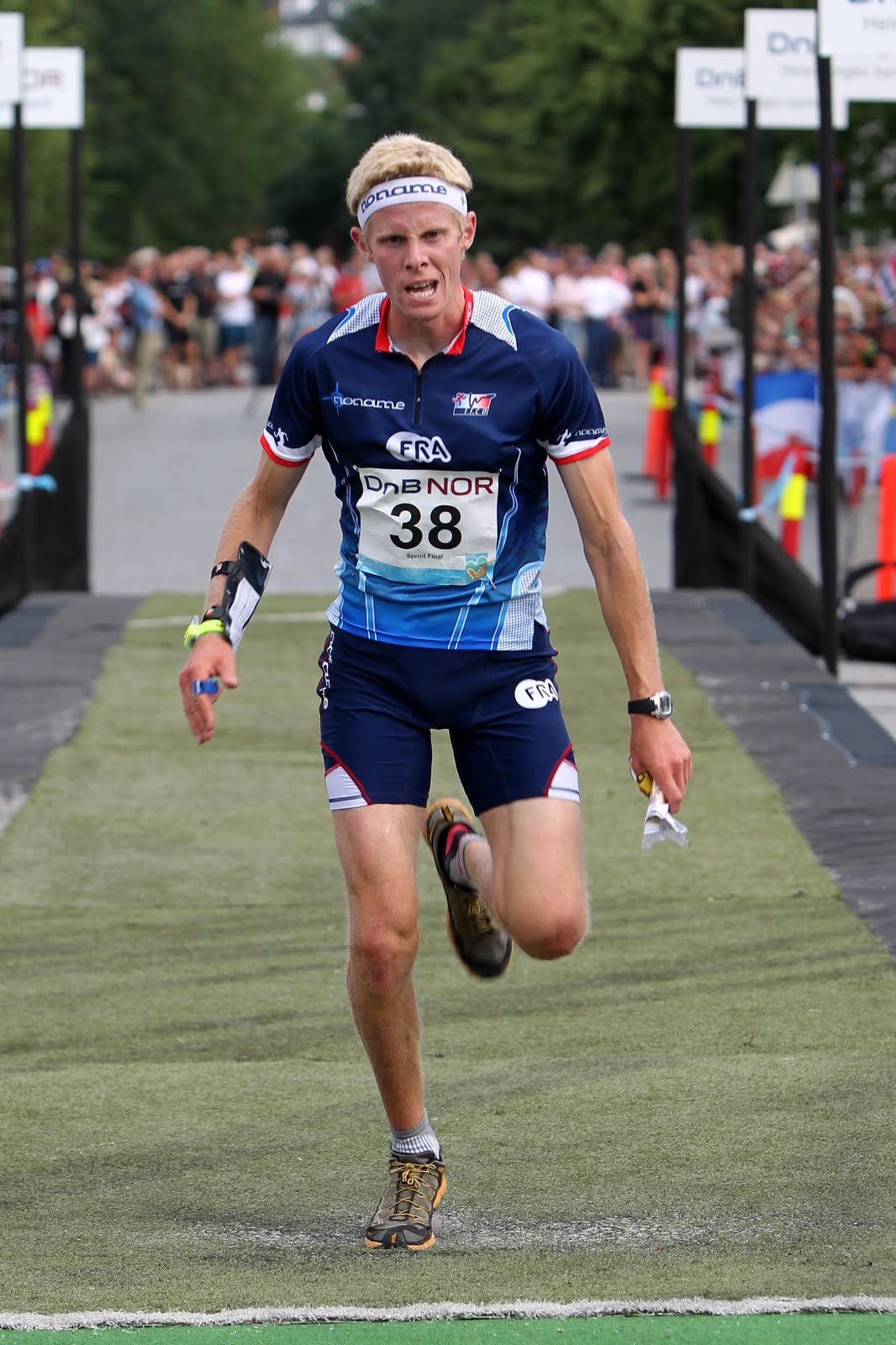
- Tranchand in 2010

Medal record

Men's orienteering

Representing France

World Championships
Silver medal – second place	2017 Tartu	Sprint
Silver medal – second place	2017 Tartu	Relay
Bronze medal – third place	2010 Trondheim	Sprint
Bronze medal – third place	2014 Trentino	Relay
Bronze medal – third place	2015 Inverness	Relay
Bronze medal – third place	2018 Riga	Relay
Bronze medal – third place	2019 Østfold	Relay

European Championships
Silver medal – second place	2010 Primorsko	Relay
Bronze medal – third place	2012 Falun	Relay

Frédéric Tranchand (born 25 May 1988) is a French competitor in orienteering and trail running. In 2025, Tranchand won the Short Trail event at the 2025 World Mountain and Trail Running Championships.

He won his first medal in the relay with the French team at the 2010 European Orienteering Championships in Primorsko, coming second along with teammates Philippe Adamski and Thierry Gueorgiou. That same year, he won a bronze medal in the sprint at the 2010 World Orienteering Championships in Trondheim, which was considered a major surprise at the time.

After a four-year period without medals at the World Championships, Tranchand returned to the podium with medals in the relay. Tranchand received his second individual medal at the 2017 World Championships in Estonia. His silver medal in the sprint event was behind multiple world champion Daniel Hubmann.

Tranchand runs for the club OK Hällen in Stigtomta, Sweden.
