= Hubmann =

Hubmann is a surname. Notable people with the surname include:

- Daniel Hubmann (born 1983), Swiss orienteer
- Martin Hubmann (born 1989), Swiss orienteer
