= Mikkel Lund =

Danish orienteering competitor (born 1979)

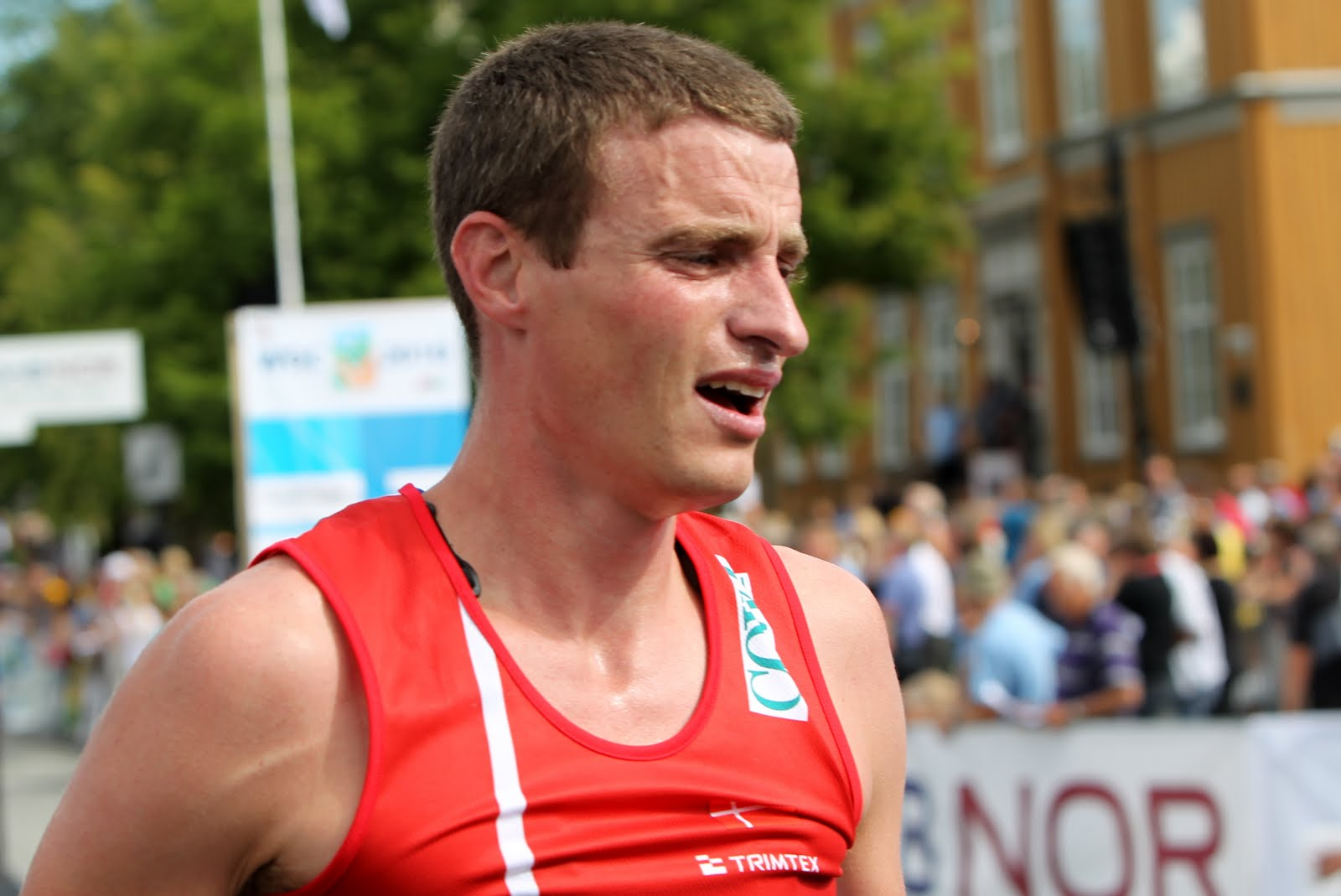
- Lund at WOC 2010

Medal record

Men's orienteering

Representing Denmark

European Championships
Bronze medal – third place	2002 Sümeg	Relay

Mikkel Lund (born 8 January 1979) is a Danish orienteering competitor.

He won a bronze medal with the Danish relay team at the 2002 European Orienteering Championships. At the 2006 World Orienteering Championships he placed 8th in the relay with the Danish team. Lund lives in Oslo and represents the club Bækkelagets SK, where he also works as a coach.
