= Sigrid Alexandersen =

Norwegian orienteer

Personal information
- Born: 1995 (age 30–31)

Sport
- Sport: Orienteering
- Club: Fossum IF
Medal record
Women's orienteering
Representing Norway
European Championships
Bronze medal – third place	2018 Cadempino	Sprint relay

Sigrid Alexandersen (born 1995) is a Norwegian orienteering competitor. At the 2018 European Orienteering Championships in Cadempino she won a bronze medal in the sprint relay with the Norwegian team, achieved a fourth place in the women's relay, placed 13th in the sprint, and 8th in the long distance. She competed at the 2018 World Orienteering Championships in Latvia, where she qualified for the sprint final. She was also Norwegian champion in sprint in 2018.

Her junior achievements included a fourth place in sprint at the 2015 Junior World Orienteering Championships in Rauland.
