= Dainora Alšauskaitė =

Lithuanian orienteering competitor (born 1977)

Medal record

Women's orienteering

Representing Lithuania

European Championships
Silver medal – second place	2004 Roskilde	Middle distance

Dainora Alšauskaitė (born 22 November 1977 in Zarasai) is a Lithuanian orienteering competitor. She received a silver medal in the middle distance at the 2004 European Orienteering Championships in Roskilde. She completed the 5.3 km course with 21 checkpoints in 30 minutes. 24 sec., just 26 sec. behind the winner Hanne Staff of Norway. It was the first medal won in an adult individual event in the history of Lithuanian orienteering in the summer.
