= Yulia Novikova =

Russian orienteering competitor

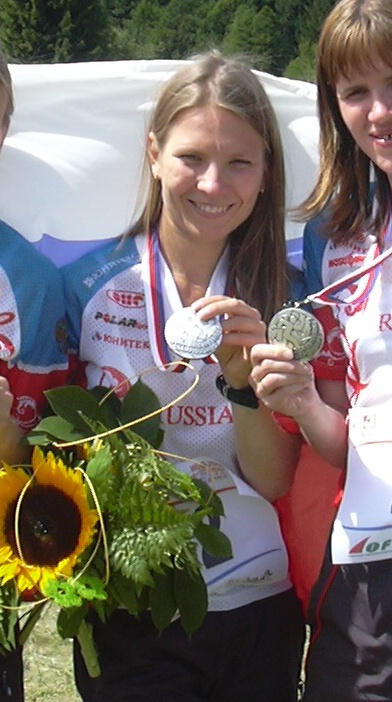
- Novikova at WOC 2008

Medal record

Women's orienteering

Representing Russia

World Championships
| Silver medal – second place | 2008 Olomouc | Relay |

World Games
| Gold medal – first place | 2009 Kaohsiung | Mixed relay |

European Championships
| Silver medal – second place | 2008 Ventspils | Relay |

Junior World Championships
| Gold medal – first place | 2000 Nové Město na Moravě | Relay |

Military World Games
| Gold medal – first place | 2019 Wuhan | Relay |
| Gold medal – first place | 2019 Wuhan | Team |

Julia Sergeyevna Novikova (Russian: Юлия Сергеевна Новикова, née Sedina; born 9 November 1980) is a Russian orienteering competitor. She was member of the Russian relay team that received a silver medal in the 2008 European Orienteering Championships, together with Natalia Korzhova and Tatiana Ryabkina.

Novikova is the second best Russian woman behind Riabkina. She is normally very safe on the first leg in relays.
