= Florian Howald =

Swiss orienteering competitor

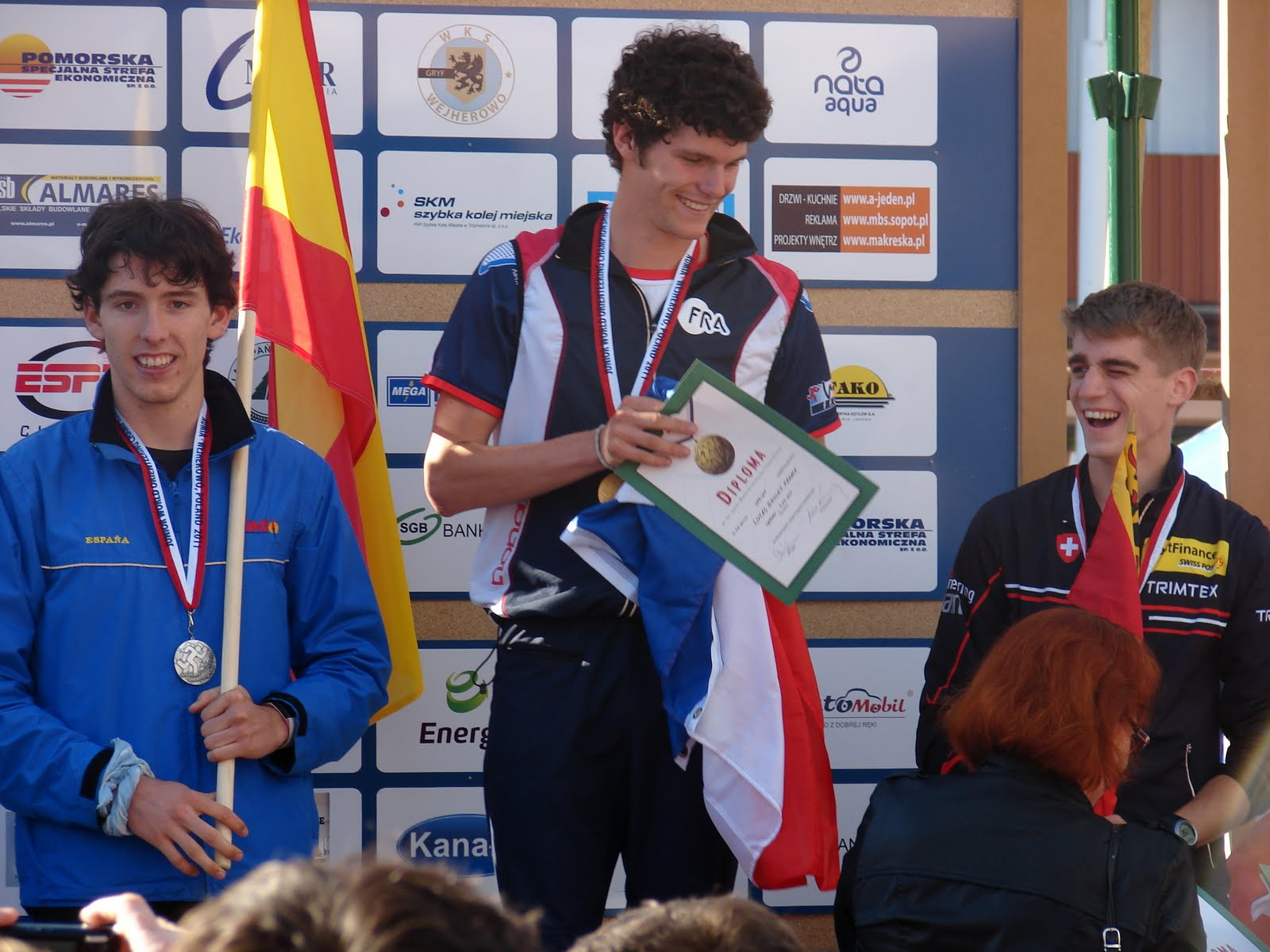
- Sprint medalists at the 2011 Junior World Championships (Howald with bronze medal)

Personal information
- Born: 20 August 1991 (age 34)

Sport
- Sport: Orienteering
Medal record
Men's orienteering
Representing Switzerland
World Championships
Silver medal – second place	2016 Strömstad	Mixed sprint relay
Bronze medal – third place	2017 Tartu	Mixed sprint relay
Bronze medal – third place	2018 Latvia	Middle
World Games
Silver medal – second place	2017 Wrocław	Middle
Silver medal – second place	2017 Wrocław	Relay
European Championships
Gold medal – first place	2016 Jeseník	Relay
Bronze medal – third place	2016 Jeseník	Sprint

Florian Howald (born 20 August 1991 in Oberönz, Switzerland) is a Swiss orienteering competitor. At the 2016 World Orienteering Championships in Strömstad he won a silver medal in mixed sprint relay with the Swiss team, along with Rahel Friederich, Martin Hubmann and Judith Wyder.

In the 2016 European Championships in the Czech Republic, Howald achieved a silver medal in the individual sprint and a surprise gold medal with the second Switzerland team, running with Baptiste Rollier and Martin Hubmann.

In the 2017 World Orienteering Championships, Howald won another medal in the mixed sprint relay, this time a bronze with Elena Roos, Martin Hubmann and Sabine Hauswirth, behind the Danish and Swedish teams.

At the 2018 European Championships in Ticino, Switzerland, he won silver in the Middle Distance. He was part of the silver team in the Men’s Relay together with Matthias Kyburz and Daniel Hubmann. He won the Mixed Sprint Relay together with Judith Wyder, Martin Hubmann and Elena Roos.

At the 2018 World Orienteering Championships in Latvia, he won silver in the Men’s Relay, bronze in the Mixed Sprint Relay and also bronze over the Middle Distance.

He works as an environmental engineer at the engineering company EBP.
