= Sofia Haajanen =

Finnish orienteering competitor

Medal record

Women's orienteering

Representing Finland

European Championships
Silver medal – second place	2012 Falun	Relay

Sofia Haajanen (born 15 January 1987) is a Finnish orienteering competitor. She won a silver medal in the relay at the 2012 European Orienteering Championships in Falun.

She competed at the 2012 World Orienteering Championships. In the middle distance she qualified for the final, where he placed 33rd.
