= Lena Eliasson =

Swedish orienteer and ski-orienteer

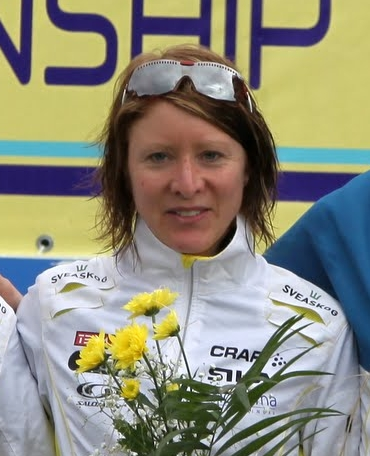
- Eliasson at EOC 2010

Medal record

Representing Sweden

Women's orienteering

World Championships
Bronze medal – third place	2007 Kyiv	Sprint
Bronze medal – third place	2011 Savoie	Sprint
Bronze medal – third place	2013 Vuokatti	Long

World Cup
Bronze medal – third place	2011	WC Overall

European Championships
Gold medal – first place	2010 Primorsko	Relay
Bronze medal – third place	2010 Primorsko	Middle

Women's ski orienteering

Junior World Championships
Silver medal – second place	2001 Trentino	Long

Lena Marie Eliasson (born July 22, 1981) is a Swedish orienteering and ski-orienteering competitor. She received a bronze medal in sprint at the World Orienteering Championships in Kyiv in 2007.

She received a silver medal in the Junior World Ski Orienteering Championships in 2001.
