= Natalia Efimova =

Russian orienteering competitor

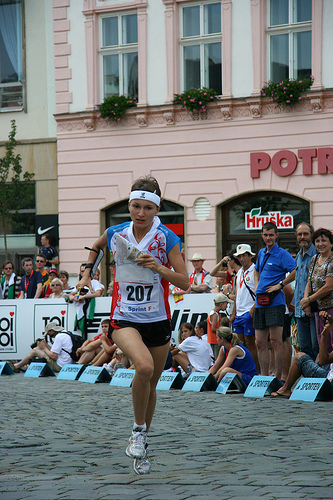
- Korzhova at WOC 2008 sprint final

Medal record

Women's orienteering

Representing Russia

European Championships
Gold medal – first place	2012 Falun	Relay
Silver medal – second place	2008 Ventspils	Relay
Bronze medal – third place	2004 Roskilde	Relay

Military World Games
Gold medal – first place	2019 Wuhan	Team

Natalia Efimova (Russian: Наталья Ефимова; born 3 July 1983) is a Russian orienteering competitor. She was a member of the Russian relay team that received a silver medal in the 2008 European Orienteering Championships, together with Yulia Novikova and Tatiana Ryabkina. She competed at the 2008 World Orienteering Championships in Olomouc, where she qualified for the finals in the sprint and in the long distance.

Her husband Roman Efimov was a member of the Russian national orienteering team.
