= Merja Rantanen =

Finnish orienteering competitor

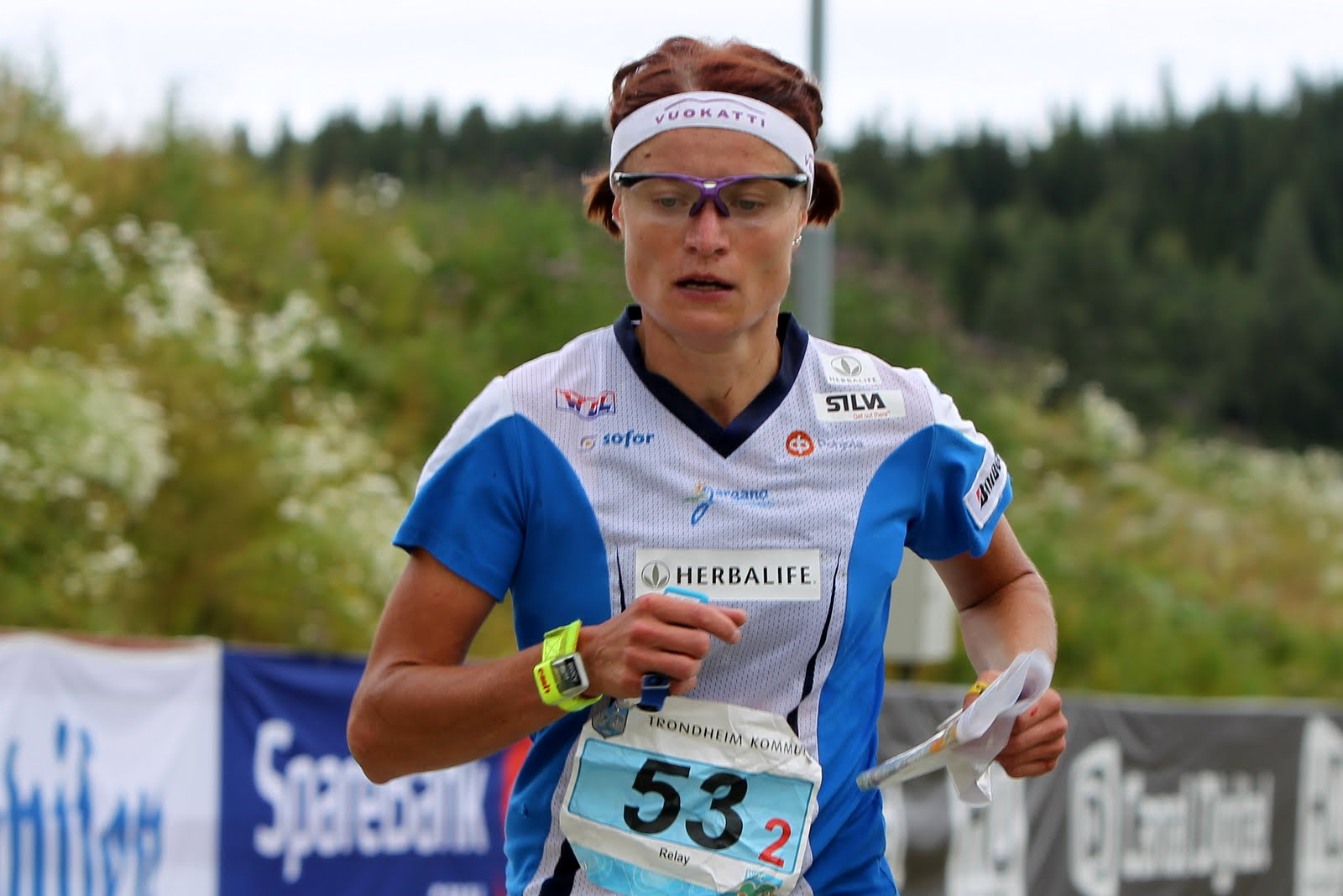
- Rantanen at WOC 2010

Medal record

Women's orienteering

Representing Finland

World Championships
Gold medal – first place	2008 Olomouc	Relay
Gold medal – first place	2010 Trondheim	Relay
Gold medal – first place	2011 Savoie	Relay
Silver medal – second place	2015 Inverness	Middle
Bronze medal – third place	2009 Miskolc	Relay
Bronze medal – third place	2013 Sotkamo	Middle
Bronze medal – third place	2016 Strömstad	Relay
Bronze medal – third place	2017 Tartu	Relay

European Championships
Silver medal – second place	2008 Ventspils	Middle
Silver medal – second place	2010 Primorsko	Relay
Silver medal – second place	2012 Falun	Relay
Bronze medal – third place	2008 Ventspils	Relay

Merja Rantanen (born 7 December 1980) is a Finnish orienteering competitor. She received a silver medal in the middle distance at the 2008 European Orienteering Championships in Ventspils. She also participated on the Finnish team (with Katri Lindeqvist and Minna Kauppi) that achieved a bronze medal in the championship relay.

== See also ==
- Finnish orienteers
- List of orienteers
- List of orienteering events
