= Kalle Dalin =

Swedish orienteer

Medal record

Men's orienteering

Representing Sweden

European Championships
Gold medal – first place	2004 Roskilde	Long distance
Bronze medal – third place	2004 Roskilde	Relay

Kalle Dalin (born March 8, 1975) is a Swedish orienteering competitor and European champion. He received a gold medal in long distance at the 2004 European Orienteering Championships, and also a bronze medal in the relay event.
