= Ann-Marie Wallsten =

Swedish orienteering competitor

Medal record

Women's orienteering

Representing Sweden

European Championships
Gold medal – first place	1964 Le Brassus	Relay
Silver medal – second place	1964 Le Brassus	Individual

Ann-Marie Wallsten (born 21 August 1943) is a Swedish orienteering competitor and European champion. She won a silver medal in the individual event and a gold medal in the relay event at the 1964 European Orienteering Championships in Le Brassus, Switzerland.

Wallsten won a gold medal at the 1964 Swedish orienteering championships, winning the relay with the club IF Goterna. She was selected to represent Sweden at the European Championships in Switzerland in September. In 1964 the European Championships were the top international orienteering events; from 1966 they were replaced by the World Championships and held every second year over the next decennium. The competition terrain in Le Brassus in 1964 consisted of a mixture of spruce forests and open grazing land at an altitude between 1,300 and 1,700 metres. The maps prepared for the competitions were special editions of Swiss military maps of scale 1:25,000. The women's individual contest was held on Saturday, 26 September. The course had a length of 8.1 kilometers and ten control points. Wallsten finished second in the race, behind Margrit Thommen from Switzerland. In the relay contest the next day, the Swedish team won gold medals, winning with a time margin of forty minutes ahead of the Swiss team. The Swedish winning team consisted of Wallsten, Eivor Steen-Olsson and Ulla Lindkvist.
