= René Rokkjær =

Danish orienteering competitor

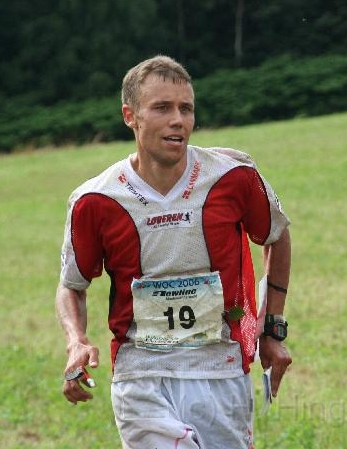
- Rokkjær at WOC 2006

Medal record

Men's orienteering

Representing Denmark

European Championships
Silver medal – second place	2004 Roskilde	Relay
Bronze medal – third place	2002 Sümeg	Relay

René Rokkjær is a Danish orienteering competitor. He won a bronze medal with the Danish relay team at the 2002 European Orienteering Championships, and a silver medal in 2004. His best individual result at the World Orienteering Championships is a 13th place in sprint in 2003. At the 2006 World Orienteering Championships he placed 8th in the relay with the Danish team.
