= Emy Gauffin =

Swedish orienteering competitor

Medal record

Women's orienteering

Representing Sweden

European Championships
Bronze medal – third place	1962 Løten	Individual

Klara Emilia "Emy" Gauffin (12 December 1928 – 2 February 1993) was a Swedish orienteering competitor. She received a bronze medal in the individual event at the 1962 European Orienteering Championships in Løten, Norway. She was also member of the Swedish team that won the relay competition, although not officially part of the championship.
