= Andreas Kyburz =

Swiss orienteering competitor

Personal information
- Born: 5 May 1988 (age 38) Rheinfelden

Sport
- Sport: Orienteering
- Club: OLK Fricktal (SUI), Tullinge SK (SWE)
Medal record
Men's orienteering
Representing Switzerland
World Championships
Bronze medal – third place	2018 Riga	Sprint
European Championships
Bronze medal – third place	2016 Jeseník	Sprint relay

Andreas Kyburz (born 5 May 1988) is a Swiss orienteering competitor. He was born in Rheinfelden. He won a bronze medal in the sprint at the 2018 World Orienteering Championships in Latvia, behind Daniel Hubmann and Tim Robertson. At the 2016 European Orienteering Championships he won a bronze medal in the sprint relay with the Swiss team.

His brother Matthias Kyburz is also an international orienteering competitor.
