= Mārtiņš Sirmais =

Latvian orienteering competitor (born 1982)

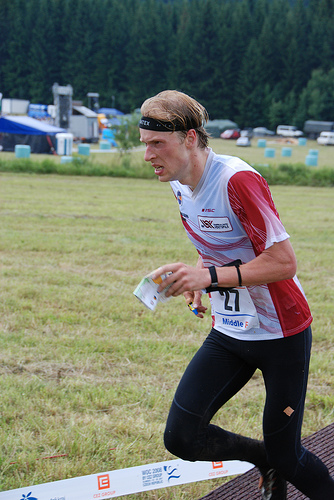
- Sirmais in WOC 2008

Personal information
- Native name: Mārtiņš Sirmais
- Nationality: (Latvia) Latvian
- Born: July 15, 1982 (age 43)
Medal record
Men's orienteering
Representing Latvia
European Championships
Silver medal – second place	2006 Otepää	Middle distance
Silver medal – second place	2008 Ventspils	Middle distance
- Updated on 17 September 2015

Mārtiņš Sirmais (born July 15, 1982 in Madona) is a Latvian orienteering competitor. He received a silver medal in the middle distance at the 2006 European Orienteering Championships in Otepää, and again at the 2008 European Orienteering Championships in Ventspils.
