= Margrit Thommen =

Swiss orienteering competitor

Medal record

Women's orienteering

Representing Switzerland

European Championships
Gold medal – first place	1964 Le Brassus	Individual
Silver medal – second place	1964 Le Brassus	Relay
Bronze medal – third place	1962 Løten	Relay (unofficial)

Margrit Thommen is a Swiss orienteering competitor and European champion. She won the gold medal in the individual event at the 1964 European Orienteering Championships, and also a silver medal in the relay event.
