= Fredrik Johansson (orienteer) =

Swedish orienteering competitor (born 1986)

Fredrik Bakkman
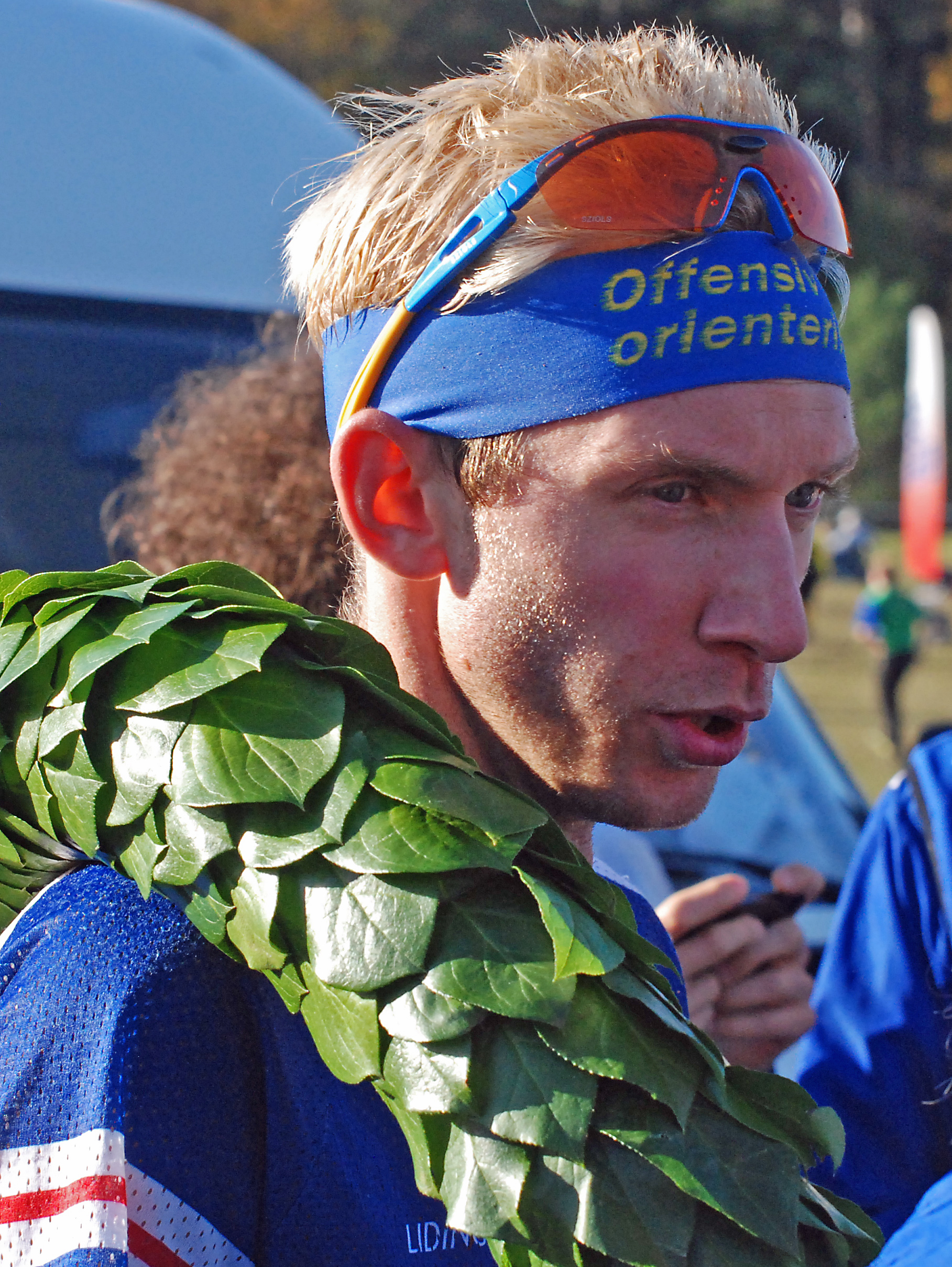

Personal information
- Born: 29 July 1986 (age 40) Borås, Sweden

Sport
- Sport: Orienteering
Medal record
Men's orienteering
Representing Sweden
World Championships
Gold medal – first place	2014 Asiago-Lavarone	Relay
Bronze medal – third place	2016 Strömstad	Relay
European Championships
Gold medal – first place	2014 Palmela	Relay
Silver medal – second place	2012 Falun	Relay
Bronze medal – third place	2014 Palmela	Long
Junior World Championships
Silver medal – second place	2006 Druskininkai	Relay

Fredrik Bakkman (previously Fredrik Johansson; born 29 July 1986) is a Swedish orienteering competitor. He was born in Borås.

He won a gold medal in the relay in the 2014 World Orienteering Championships in Asiago-Lavarone with the Swedish team, and placed 6th in the long distance. At the 2016 World Orienteering Championships in Strömstad he won a bronze medal in relay with the Swedish team, along with Gustav Bergman and William Lind.

As a junior, he won a silver medal in the relay at the 2006 Junior World Championships in Druskininkai, where he also placed seventh in the long course.

He won the Jukola relay in 2017.
