= Nadiya Volynska =

Ukrainian orienteer

Medal record

Women's orienteering

Representing Ukraine

World Championships
Silver medal – second place	2015 Inverness	Sprint

World Cup
Bronze medal – third place	2015	WC Overall

European Championships
Silver medal – second place	2014 Palmela	Sprint
Silver medal – second place	2016 Jeseník	Sprint

World Games
Bronze medal – third place	2013 Cali	Middle

Nadiya Volynska is a Ukrainian orienteering competitor. At the World Games in 2013 she won a bronze medal in the middle distance, behind Minna Kauppi and Tove Alexandersson, and ahead of Anne Margrethe Hausken Nordberg. Since then, Volynska has specialised in Sprint Orienteering. She now has 3 silver medals at major championships.
