= Signe Søes =

Danish orienteering competitor

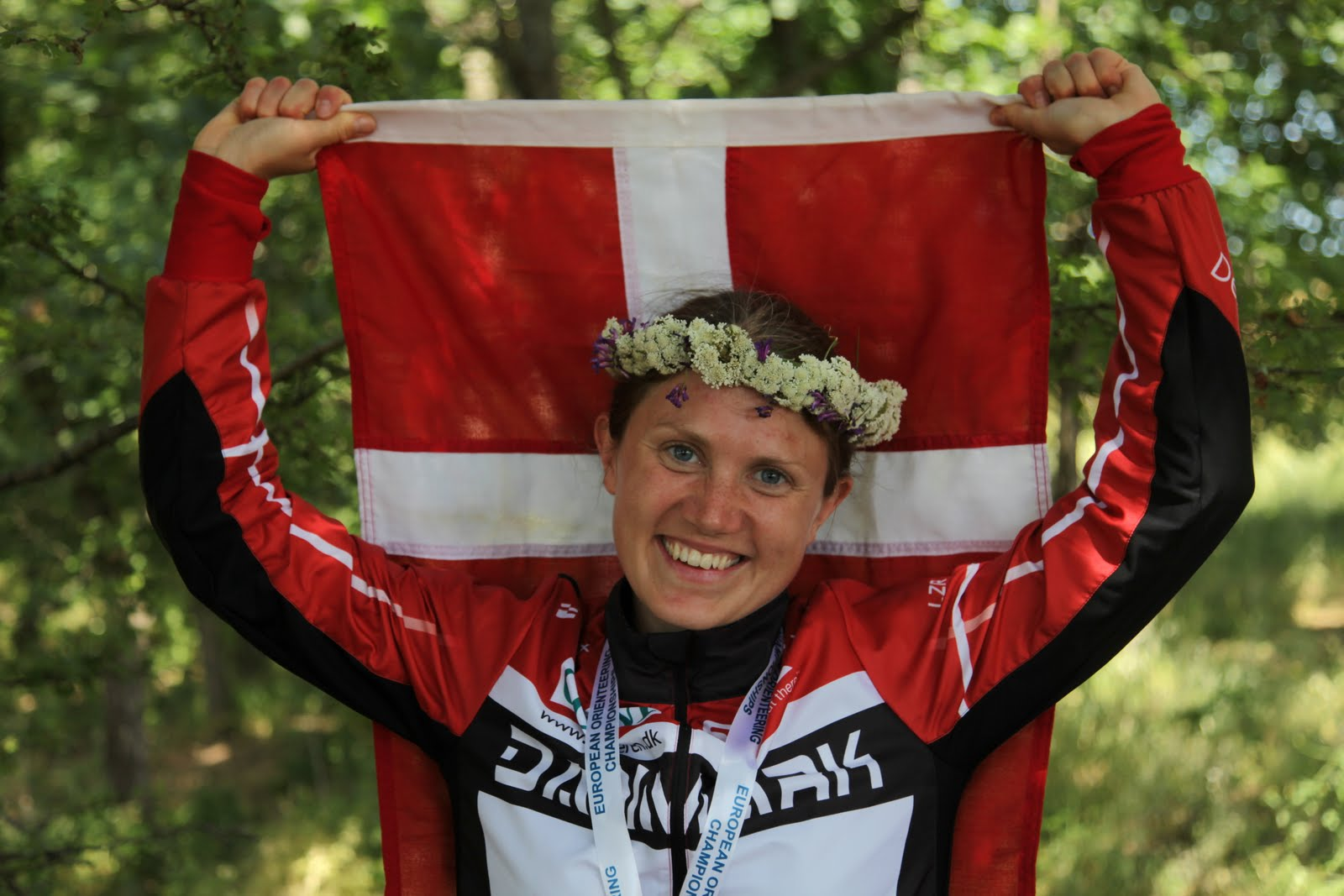
- EOC-2010

Medal record

Women's orienteering

Representing Denmark

European Championships
Gold medal – first place	2014 Palmela	Middle
Silver medal – second place	2010 Primorsko	Middle

Junior World Championships
Silver medal – second place	2003 Põlva	Short

Signe Søes (born 1983) is a Danish orienteering competitor. She won a silver medal in the short distance at the 2003 Junior World Orienteering Championships in Põlva. She placed fourth in the sprint, 10th in the middle and 12th in the long distance at the 2009 World Orienteering Championships in Miskolc. At the 2008 and 2010 World Cups, she placed 2nd. At the European Championships 2014 at Palmela, Portugal, Søes became European Champion in the middle distance winning a gold medal.
