= 2018 World Orienteering Championships =

International orienteering competition held in Latvia

- Country: Latvia
- Events: 9
- Dates: August 4–11, 2018
- Website: woc2018.lv

The 35th World Orienteering Championships were held in Latvia in August 2018. The hosts were Riga, Sigulda and Turaida.

== Schedule ==
Date	Event	Location
4 Aug	Sprint	Riga
5 Aug	Sprint relay	Riga
6 Aug	Rest day	
7 Aug	Middle distance	Sigulda
8 Aug	Rest day	
9 Aug	Relay	Turaida
10 Aug	Rest day	
11 Aug	Long distance	Turaida

== Medal summary ==
=== Medal table ===
Rank	Nation	Gold	Silver	Bronze	Total
1	Norway (NOR)	3	0	0	3
2	Switzerland (SUI)	2	3	5	10
3	Sweden (SWE)	2	2	0	4
4	Denmark (DEN)	1	1	1	3
5	Russia (RUS)	1	0	1	2
6	Finland (FIN)	0	1	0	1
6	New Zealand (NZL)	0	1	0	1
6	Ukraine (UKR)	0	1	0	1
9	France (FRA)	0	0	2	2
10	Italy (ITA)	0	0	0	0
Totals (10 entries)		9	9	9	27

=== Men ===
Event	Gold		Silver		Bronze	
Sprint	Daniel Hubmann (SUI)	14:05.9	Tim Robertson (NZL)	14:07.0	Andreas Kyburz (SUI)	14:26.0
Middle distance	Eskil Kinneberg (NOR)	32:59	Daniel Hubmann (SUI)	33:05	Florian Howald (SUI)	33:13
Long distance	Olav Lundanes (NOR)	1:37:43	Ruslan Glibov (UKR)	1:40:20	Fabian Hertner (SUI)	1:40:47
Relay	Norway; Gaute Hallan Steiwer; Eskil Kinneberg; Magne Dæhli	1:47:26	Switzerland; Florian Howald; Daniel Hubmann; Matthias Kyburz	1:47:30	France; Nicolas Rio; Lucas Basset; Frédéric Tranchand	1:47:36

=== Women ===
Event	Gold		Silver		Bronze	
Sprint	Maja Alm (DEN)	13:43.1	Tove Alexandersson (SWE)	14:00.0	Judith Wyder (SUI)	14:10.3
Middle distance	Natalia Gemperle (RUS)	32:02	Marika Teini (FIN)	33:32	Isia Basset (FRA)	33:56
Long distance	Tove Alexandersson (SWE)	1:14:04	Maja Alm (DEN)	1:15:31	Sabine Hauswirth (SUI)	1:16:30
Relay	Switzerland; Elena Roos; Julia Jakob; Judith Wyder	1:45:03	Sweden; Helena Bergman; Karolin Ohlsson; Tove Alexandersson	1:45:18	Russia; Anastasia Rudnaya; Tatyana Riabkina; Natalia Gemperle	1:47:20

=== Mixed ===
Event	Gold		Silver		Bronze	
Sprint relay	Sweden; Tove Alexandersson; Emil Svensk; Jonas Leandersson; Karolin Ohlsson	58:27	Switzerland; Elena Roos; Florian Howald; Fabian Hertner; Judith Wyder	58:58	Denmark; Amanda Falck Weber; Tue Lassen; Jakob Edsen; Maja Alm	59:14
