= Tatiana Ryabkina =

Russian orienteering competitor

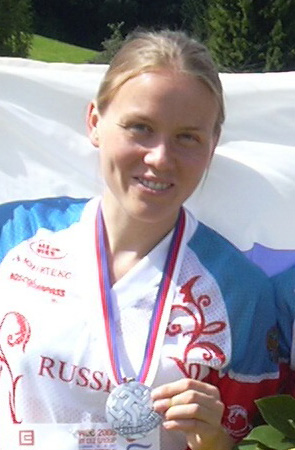

Medal record

Women's orienteering

Representing Russia

World Championships
Silver medal – second place	2004 Västerås	Middle
Silver medal – second place	2008 Olomouc	Relay
Bronze medal – third place	2006 Aarhus	Middle
Bronze medal – third place	2012 Lausanne	Middle
Bronze medal – third place	2015 Inverness	Mixed sprint relay
Bronze medal – third place	2019 Østfold	Relay

World Cup
Silver medal – second place	2004	WC Overall

European Championships
Gold medal – first place	2012 Falun	Relay
Silver medal – second place	2008 Ventspils	Long
Silver medal – second place	2008 Ventspils	Relay
Silver medal – second place	2012 Falun	Long
Bronze medal – third place	2004 Roskilde	Long
Bronze medal – third place	2004 Roskilde	Middle
Bronze medal – third place	2004 Roskilde	Relay
Bronze medal – third place	2012 Falun	Middle

Junior World Championships
Gold medal – first place	1998 Reims	Short
Gold medal – first place	1999 Varna	Relay
Gold medal – first place	2000 Nove Mesto	Long
Gold medal – first place	2000 Nove Mesto	Relay
Silver medal – second place	1998 Reims	Long
Silver medal – second place	1998 Reims	Relay
Silver medal – second place	1999 Varna	Long
Bronze medal – third place	1996 Govora	Relay

Tatiana Ryabkina (née Pereliaeva; born 13 May 1980) is a Russian orienteering competitor. She won the O-Ringen in 2012 and had international success.

== World championships ==
She received a silver medal in the middle distance at the 2004 World Orienteering Championships in Västerås, and a bronze medal in 2006. Her last medal came in the relay at the 2019 World Orienteering Championships in Østfold, where the Russian team came third.

== European championships ==
She received two bronze medals at the 2004 European Orienteering Championships in Roskilde, and a silver medal in the long distance in Ventspils in 2008. She was member of the Russian relay team that received a silver medal in 2008, together with Natalia Korzhova and Yulia Novikova. She won her only gold medal in senior international competition at the 2012 European Orienteering Championships in Falun, where she ran with Svetlana Mironova and Natalia Efimova.

== Junior career ==
Tatiana won four gold medals at Junior World Orienteering Championships.
