= Håkan Pettersson (orienteer) =

Swedish orienteering competitor

Medal record

Men's orienteering

Representing Sweden

European Championships
Silver medal – second place	2002 Sümeg	Sprint distance

Junior World Championships
Gold medal – first place	1998 Reims	Classic distance

Håkan Pettersson is a Swedish orienteering competitor.

He received a silver medal in the sprint distance at the 2002 European Orienteering Championships in Sümeg.

He is junior world champion in the classic distance from 1998.
