= Philippe Adamski =

French orienteering competitor

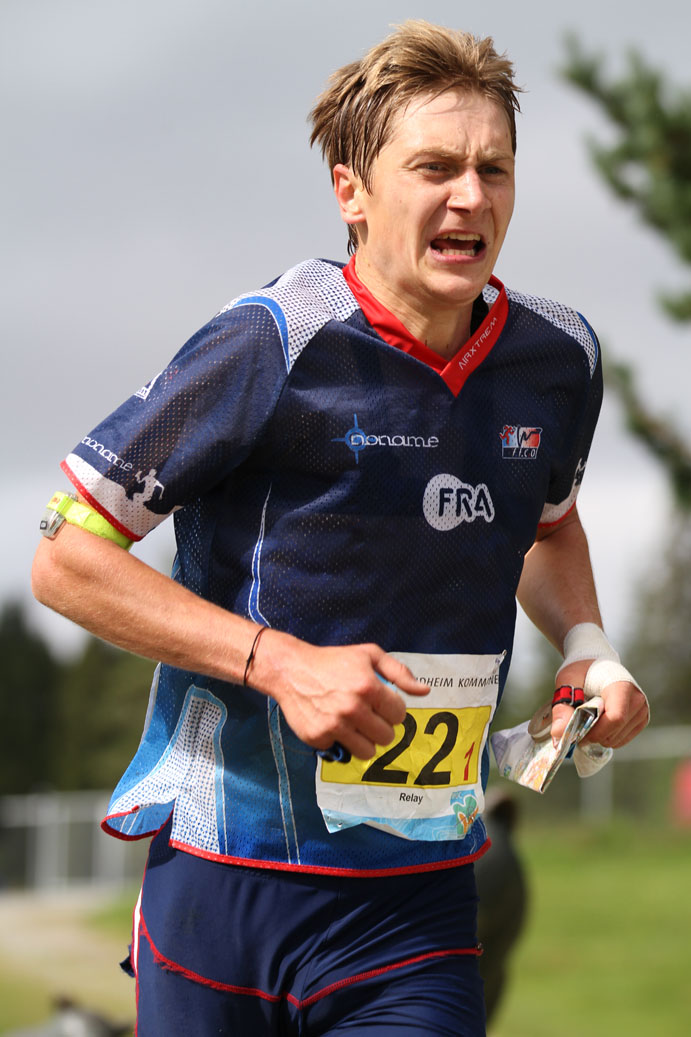

Medal record

Men's orienteering

Representing France

World Championships
Gold medal – first place	2011 Savoie	Relay

European Championships
Silver medal – second place	2010 Primorsko	Long
Silver medal – second place	2010 Primorsko	Relay
Bronze medal – third place	2012 Falun	Relay

Junior World Championships
Silver medal – second place	2005 Tenero	Middle
Bronze medal – third place	2005 Tenero	Long

Philippe Adamski (born 8 April 1985) is a French orienteering competitor. He has been a member of the French club Tous Azimuts Douai since he started orienteering. He also runs for Finnish club Kalevan Rasti.

== Career ==
Adamski started competitive orienteering relatively late, when he was 17, after having some practice at school. However, he reached a high level quickly and took part in his first junior world championships in Estonia one year later (2003). his attendance at the Junior World Orienteering Championships in Poland showed his quick improvement with 2 top 15 places.

At JWOC 2005 in Switzerland, he gained his first medals with silver in the middle distance and bronze in the long distance.

At senior level, He won silver in the World University Orienteering Championships in Slovakia (Kosice, 2006). The same year, he was in the first team at the Orienteering World Cup relay in Montlosier, his first time running for the French Team. (the team was disqualified.)

He competed in the French relay team at the 2009 World Orienteering Championships in Miskolc. He won a silver medal in the long distance, and a silver medal in the relay with the French team at the 2010 European Orienteering Championships in Primorsko.

At the 2010 WOC, For the 3rd time in a row, he was unlucky with the WOC relay when his teammate Thierry Gueorgiou missed a control whilst in a leading position.

Finally in 2011, on home Ground in France, he became world champion in Relay, together with François Gonon and Thierry Gueorgiou.
