= 2016 World Orienteering Championships =

2016 edition of the World Orienteering Championships

2016 World Orienteering Championships / 2016 World Trail Orienteering Championships
- Host city: Strömstad/Tanum
- Country: Sweden
- Opening: 20 August 2016
- Closing: 27 August 2016
- Website: woc2016.se

The 33rd World Orienteering Championships in conjunction with the 13th World Trail Orienteering Championships was held in Strömstad and Tanum, Sweden.

== Results ==
Event	Gold		Silver		Bronze	
FootO results
Men's sprint	Jerker Lysell (SWE)	14:28.6	Matthias Kyburz (SUI)	14:31.4	Daniel Hubmann (SUI)	14:37.2
Women's sprint	Maja Alm (DEN)	14:27.9	Judith Wyder (SUI)	14:53.6	Anastasia Denisova (BLR)	15:10.6
Mixed sprint relay	Denmark (DEN): Cecilie Friberg Klysner; Tue Lassen; Søren Bobach; Maja Alm	52:35	Switzerland (SUI): Rahel Friederich; Florian Howald; Martin Hubmann; Judith Wyder	52:51	Sweden (SWE): Lina Strand; Gustav Bergman; Jonas Leandersson; Helena Jansson	53:36
Men's middle distance	Matthias Kyburz (SUI)	37:09	Olav Lundanes (NOR)	37:23	Daniel Hubmann (SUI)	37:32
Women's middle distance	Tove Alexandersson (SWE)	33:57	Heidi Bagstevold (NOR)	34:32	Natalia Gemperle (RUS)	34:35
Men's long distance	Olav Lundanes (NOR)	1:33:27	Thierry Gueorgiou (FRA)	1:35:13	Daniel Hubmann (SUI)	1:35:32
Women's long distance	Tove Alexandersson (SWE)	1:26:24	Natalia Gemperle (RUS)	1:26:50	Anne Margrethe Hausken (NOR)	1:28:25
Men's relay	Norway (NOR): Carl Godager Kaas; Olav Lundanes; Magne Dæhli	1:47:44	Switzerland (SUI): Fabian Hertner; Daniel Hubmann; Matthias Kyburz	1:49:38	Sweden (SWE): Fredrik Bakkman; Gustav Bergman; William Lind	1:52:23
Women's relay	Russia (RUS): Anastasia Rudnaya; Svetlana Mironova; Natalia Gemperle	1:48:21	Denmark (DEN): Signe Klinting; Ida Bobach; Maja Alm	1:48:53	Finland (FIN): Sari Anttonen; Marika Teini; Merja Rantanen	1:49:41
TrailO results
TempO	Lars Jakob Waaler (NOR)	243.5"	Marit Wiksell (SWE)	256.5"	Pinja Mäkinen (FIN)	262"
PreO Open	Martin Fredholm (SWE)	48 pts. 40.5"	Martin Jullum (NOR)	47 pts. 34.5"	Janis Rukšans (LAT)	47 pts. 44"
PreO Paralympic	Michael Johansson (SWE)	46 pts. 74.5"	Pavel Shmatov (RUS)	46 pts. 122"	Ola Jansson (SWE)	45 pts. 44.5"
Relay Open	Slovakia (SVK): Marián Mikluš; Dušan Furucz; Ján Furucz	1'42"	Portugal (POR): Edgar Domingues; Jorge Baltazar; João Pedro Valente	3'13"	Finland (FIN): Martti Inkinen; Pinja Mäkinen; Antti Rusanen	3'33"
Relay Paralympic	Sweden (SWE): Inga Gunnarsson; Ola Jansson; Michael Johansson	5'34.5"	Ukraine (UKR): Iryna Kulikova; Yehor Surkov; Vladislav Vovk	6'42"	Finland (FIN): Kari Pinola; Tuomo Markelin; Pekka Seppä	7'03"
