= Elena Roos =

Swiss orienteer

Medal record

Representing Switzerland

Women's orienteering

World Championships
Gold medal – first place	2018 Riga	Relay
Silver medal – second place	2018 Riga	Mixed Sprint Relay
Silver medal – second place	2021 Doksy	Relay
Bronze medal – third place	2017 Tartu	Mixed Sprint Relay
Bronze medal – third place	2021 Doksy	Mixed Sprint Relay

World Games
Gold medal – first place	2022 Birmingham	Mixed Sprint Relay
Silver medal – second place	2017 Wrocław	Sprint
Silver medal – second place	2017 Wrocław	Mixed Sprint Relay
Bronze medal – third place	2022 Birmingham	Sprint

Military World Games
Bronze medal – third place	2019 Wuhan	Individual long distance

Elena Roos (born 1991) is a Swiss orienteer. She won her first World Championship medal at the 2017 World Orienteering Championships, receiving a bronze in the Mixed Sprint Relay along with Sabine Hauswirth, Martin Hubmann and Florian Howald. In the same year, she won the silver medal at the 2017 World Games in Wrocław, Poland.

She runs for Orientisti 92 Piano di Magadino (Ticino, Switzerland) and Halden SK (Norway).
