= Magne Lystad =

Norwegian orienteer

Magne Lystad (12 November 1932 in Kongsvinger – 21 January 1999 in Oslo) was a Norwegian orienteering competitor.

Magne Lystad won the first ever European championships in orienteering in 1962, and finished second in the team relay. He became Nordic champion in 1957 and 1959. Lystad was crowned Norwegian champion seven times between 1954 and 1962.

In 1957 Lystad shared the title Norwegian Sportsperson of the Year with speedskater Knut Johannesen.

Awards
Preceded by Egil Danielsen	Norwegian Sportsperson of the Year; 1957	Succeeded by Inger Bjørnbakken
