= Carl Waaler Kaas =

Norwegian orienteer (born 1982)

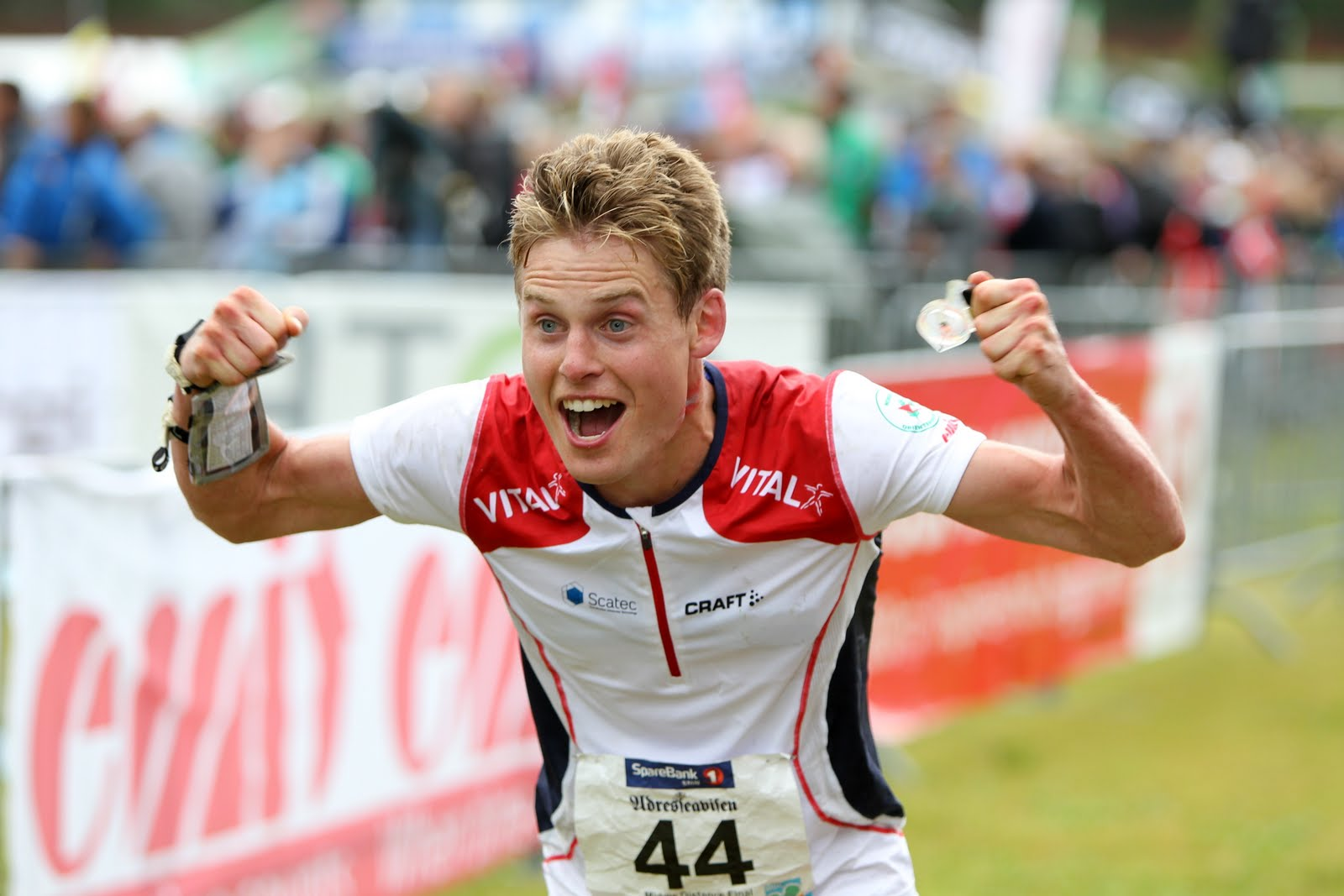
- Carl Waaler Kaas at WOC 2010

Personal information
- Born: 28 July 1982 (age 43)

Sport
- Sport: Orienteering
- Club: Heming-Njård; IL Tyrving; NTNUI; Bækkelagets SK
Medal record
Men's orienteering
Representing Norway
World Championships
Gold medal – first place	2010 Trondheim	Middle
Gold medal – first place	2016 Strömstad	Relay
Silver medal – second place	2010 Trondheim	Relay
Silver medal – second place	2011 Savoie	Relay
Silver medal – second place	2012 Lausanne	Relay
Silver medal – second place	2015 Inverness	Relay
European Championships
Bronze medal – third place	2006 Otepää	Relay
Bronze medal – third place	2010 Primorsko	Relay
Bronze medal – third place	2012 Falun	Middle

Carl Waaler Kaas (born 28 July 1982) is a Norwegian orienteering competitor, and medal winner from both World Orienteering Championships and European Orienteering Championships.

Waaler Kaas won the middle distance event in the World Orienteering Championships in 2010 in Trondheim, Norway. Later same week he won silver in the relay event together with Audun Weltzien and Olav Lundanes.

He received a bronze medal in the relay event at the European Orienteering Championships in 2006 in Otepää, together with Lars Skjeset and Øystein Kvaal Østerbø. He finished 14th in the sprint event.

His first appearance in the World Championships was in Olomouc in 2008, where he finished 11th in the long course.

He now represents the club Bækkelagets SK. His previous clubs include: Heming-Njård, IL Tyrving and NTNUI in Trondheim.
