= Emma Claesson =

Swedish orienteering competitor

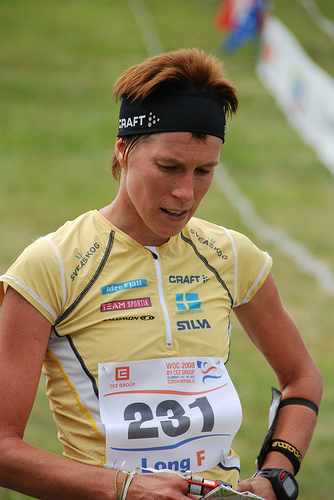
- Emma Engstrand at WOC 2008

Medal record

Women's orienteering

Representing Sweden

World Championships
Silver medal – second place	2007 Kyiv	Relay
Bronze medal – third place	2010 Trondheim	Relay
Bronze medal – third place	2010 Trondheim	Long
Bronze medal – third place	2005 Aichi	Relay

European Championships
Gold medal – first place	2008 Ventspils	Relay
Silver medal – second place	2004 Roskilde	Long distance
Bronze medal – third place	2004 Roskilde	Sprint
Bronze medal – third place	2008 Ventspils	Long distance

Junior World Championships
Gold medal – first place	1997 Leopoldsburg	Relay

Emma Claesson (née Engstrand; born 14 December 1977) is a Swedish orienteering competitor from Borlänge. She received a silver medal on the relay at the 2007 World Orienteering Championships in Kyiv, and a bronze medal in 2005. As a last-minute replacement in the Swedish relay team, she earned a bronze medal in the relay at the 2010 World Orienteering Championships in Trondheim, Norway. This was her second medal at those Championships, as she earned another bronze in the long distance, her first individual WOC medal. She is an 11-time Swedish champion.
