= Jonas Leandersson =

Swedish orienteering competitor

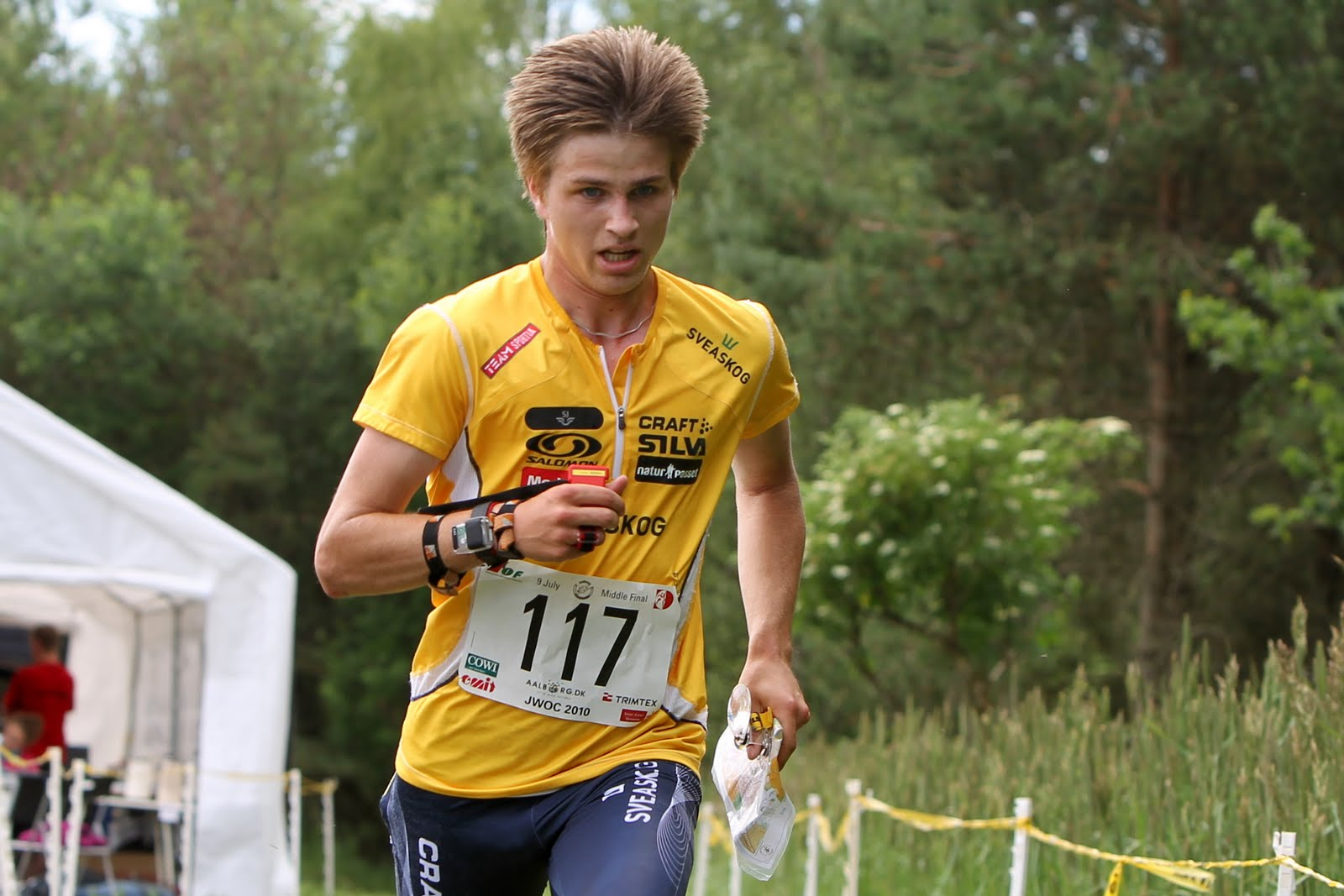
- Leandersson at JWOC 2010

Personal information
- Born: 22 January 1990 (age 36)

Sport
- Sport: Orienteering
- Club: Södertälje-Nykvarn Orientering
Medal record
Men's orienteering
Representing Sweden
World Championships
| Gold medal – first place | 2014 Trentino–Veneto | Relay |
| Gold medal – first place | 2015 Inverness | Sprint |
| Gold medal – first place | 2017 Tartu | Sprint relay |
| Gold medal – first place | 2018 Riga | Mixed sprint relay |
| Bronze medal – third place | 2012 Lausanne | Relay |
| Bronze medal – third place | 2013 Vuokatti | Sprint |
| Bronze medal – third place | 2016 Strömstad | Mixed sprint relay |
European Championships
| Gold medal – first place | 2012 Falun | Sprint |
| Silver medal – second place | 2012 Falun | Relay |

Jonas Leandersson (born 22 January 1990) is a Swedish orienteering competitor. He won a gold medal in the sprint at the 2012 European Orienteering Championships in Falun. Gold at the 2014 European Orienteering Championships in relay and gold at the 2014 World Orienteering Championships relay competing with the same relay team.

He competed at the 2012 World Orienteering Championships. In the sprint competition he qualified for the final, where he placed 15th. At the 2018 World Orienteering Championships in Latvia he won a gold medal in the mixed sprint relay, together with Karolin Ohlsson, Emil Svensk and Tove Alexandersson.

== Results ==
=== World Championship results ===
Year
| Year | Age | Long | Middle | Sprint | Relay | Sprint; Relay |
| 2012 | 22 | — | — | 15 | 3 | —N/a |
| 2013 | 23 | — | — | 3 | — | —N/a |
| 2014 | 24 | — | — | 6 | 1 | 4 |
| 2015 | 25 | DSQ | — | 1 | 7 | 5 |
| 2016 | 26 | — | — | 5 | — | 3 |
| 2017 | 27 | — | — | 5 | — | 1 |
| 2018 | 28 | — | 29 | 19 | 9 | 1 |

=== World Cup victories ===
| No. | Date | Venue | Distance |
|---|---|---|---|
| 1. | 19 May 2012 | (Sweden) Falun | Sprint (EOC) |
| 2. | 7 September 2012 | (Finland) Vuokatti | Sprint |
| 3. | 13 April 2014 | (Portugal) Palmela | Sprint (EOC) |
| 4. | 11 June 2014 | (Finland) Imatra | Sprint |
| 5. | 2 August 2015 | (Scotland) Forres | Sprint (WOC) |
| 6. | 16 October 2016 | (Switzerland) Aarau | Sprint |
| 7. | 7 October 2018 | (Czech Republic) Prague | Sprint |
