= Judith Wyder =

Swiss Ski-orienteer

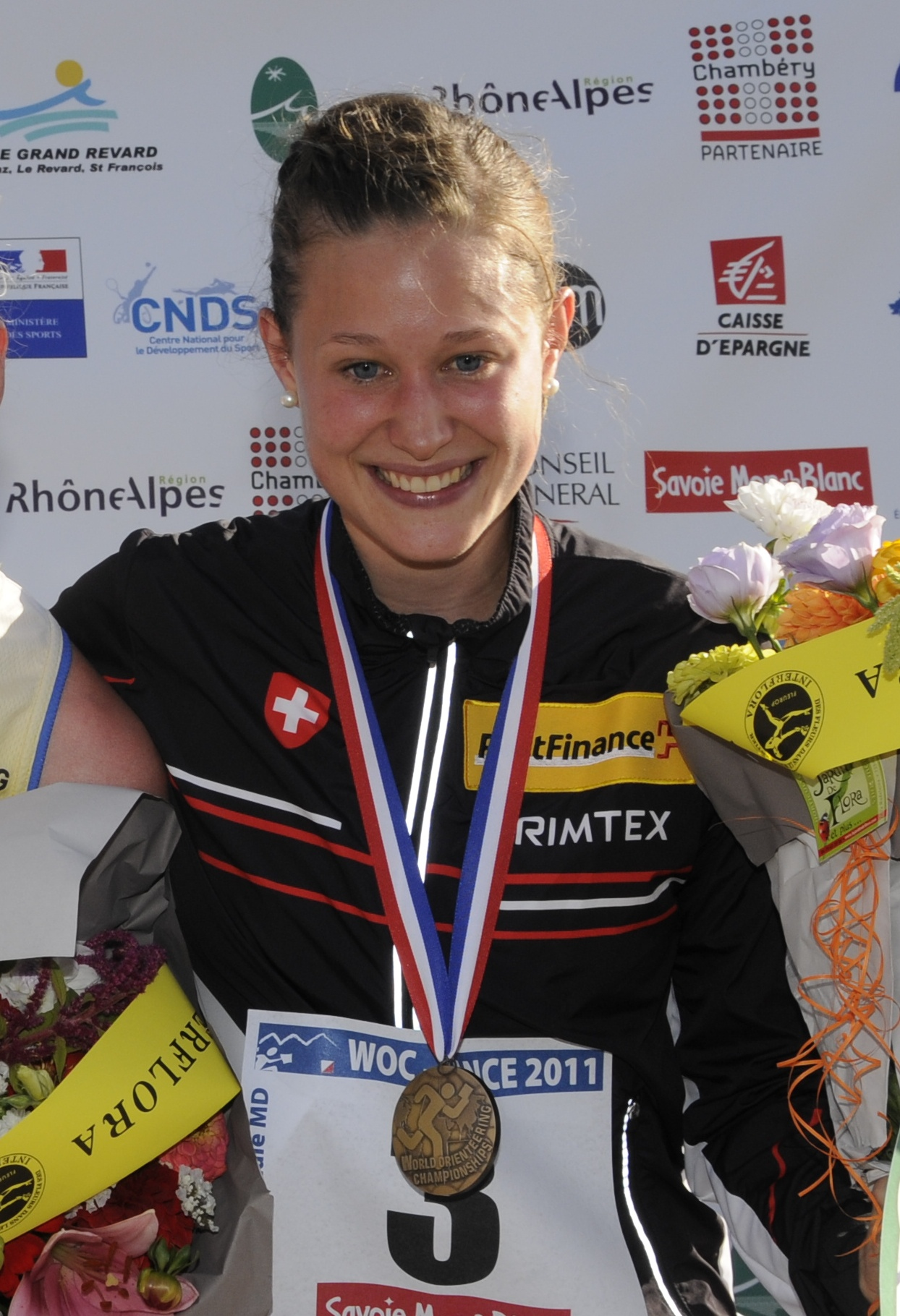
- Wyder at WOC 2011

Personal information
- Nationality: Swiss
- Born: 25 June 1988 (age 38)

Sport
- Sport: Orienteering
Medal record
Representing Switzerland
Women's orienteering
World Championships
Gold medal – first place	2012 Lausanne	Relay
Gold medal – first place	2014 Asiago-Lavarone	Sprint
Gold medal – first place	2014 Asiago-Lavarone	Relay
Gold medal – first place	2014 Asiago-Lavarone	Sprint Relay
Silver medal – second place	2016 Strömstad	Mixed sprint relay
Silver medal – second place	2016 Riga	Mixed sprint relay
Bronze medal – third place	2011 Savoie	Middle
Bronze medal – third place	2013 Vuokatti	Relay
Bronze medal – third place	2014 Asiago-Lavarone	Long
Bronze medal – third place	2018 Riga	Sprint
World Games
Gold medal – first place	2013 Cali	Relay
European Championships
Gold medal – first place	2014 Palmela	Sprint
Gold medal – first place	2014 Palmela	Relay
Gold medal – first place	2014 Palmela	Long
Junior World Championships
Bronze medal – third place	2007 Dubbo	Relay
Women's ski orienteering
Junior World Championships
Silver medal – second place	2008 Dospat	Long

Judith Wyder (born 25 June 1988) is a Swiss orienteering and ski orienteering competitor and runner. Her achievements include gold medals at the World Orienteering Championships and the European Orienteering Championships, both individually and with the Swiss relay team.

== Biography ==
As a junior, Wyder won World Championship medals in both orienteering and ski orienteering.

She won a bronze medal in the middle distance at the 2011 World Orienteering Championships in Chambéry, a gold medal in the relay at the 2012 World Orienteering Championships in Lausanne and a bronze medal in the relay at the 2013 World Orienteering Championships in Vuokatti.

In 2014, Wyder became the dominant Swiss female orienteer after the retirement of Simone Niggli. She dominated the European Orienteering Championships in Portugal where she won gold in both the sprint and in the long distance. She also won the World Cup sprint race ahead of WOC in Italy – a very technical sprint in Imatra, Finland. After that she achieved three gold medals and a bronze medal in the 2014 World Orienteering Championships in Asiago-Lavarone showing her incredible talent.

In 2017, she took a break from competing in Orienteering in order to have her first child.

In 2018, Wyder won a bronze medal in the sprint distance and a silver medal in the sprint relay at the 2018 World Orienteering Championship in Riga.

Wyder began to focus on trail running and skyrunning in 2019. She set a new course record at the DoloMyths Run, finished second at Sierre-Zinal and won the Ring of Steall Skyrace, also in a course record. She then won the Annapurna Trail Marathon which gave her the overall women's victory in the Golden Trail World Series.

Following the 2019 season, pregnant with her second child, Wyder suffered a stroke on Christmas Day following severe headaches. Wyder returned to training following the birth of her second child in June 2020, but has a permanent spot on her right eye where she is unable to see, which has affected her map-reading for orienteering, and has memory problems which were not previously present.

She won silver (individual and team) in the Trail Short during the IAU Trail World Championships 2023.
