= Svetlana Mironova =

Russian orienteering competitor

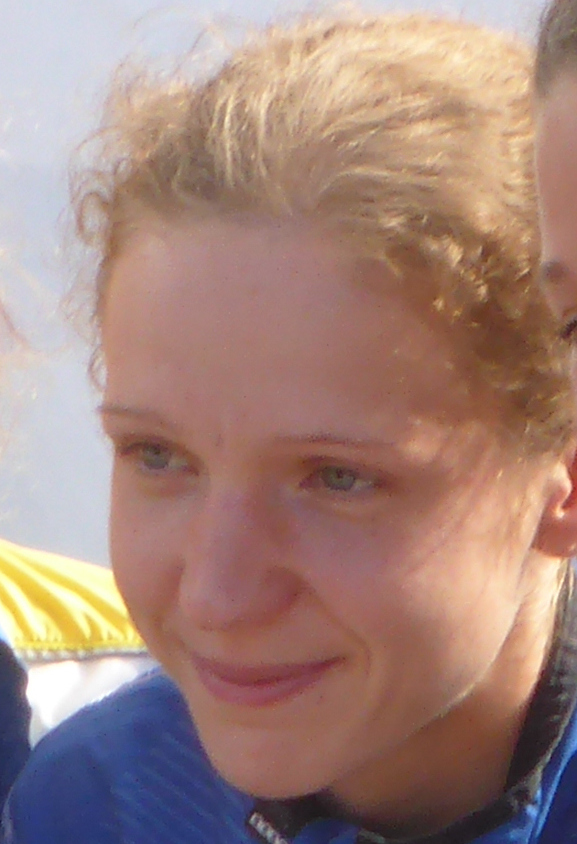

Personal information
- Full name: Svetlana Nikolayevna Mironova
- Nationality: Russian
- Born: 20 August 1986 (age 39) Gorky, Soviet Union (now Nizhny Novgorod, Russia)

Sport
- Country: Russia
- Sport: Orienteering
Medal record
Women's orienteering
Representing Russia
World Championships
Gold medal – first place	2014 Asiago-Lavarone	Long
Gold medal – first place	2016 Strömstad	Relay
Silver medal – second place	2017 Tartu	Relay
European Championships
Gold medal – first place	2012 Falun	Relay
Military World Games
Gold medal – first place	2019 Wuhan	Relay
Gold medal – first place	2019 Wuhan	Team

Svetlana Nikolayevna Mironova (Russian: Светлана Николаевна Миронова; born 20 August 1986) is a Russian orienteering competitor. She won a gold medal in the relay at the 2012 European Orienteering Championships in Falun.

She competed at the 2012 World Orienteering Championships. In the middle distance she qualified for the final, where she placed 21st.
