= 2010 World Orienteering Championships =

2010 edition of the World Orienteering Championships

- Host city: Trondheim
- Country: Norway
- Events: 8

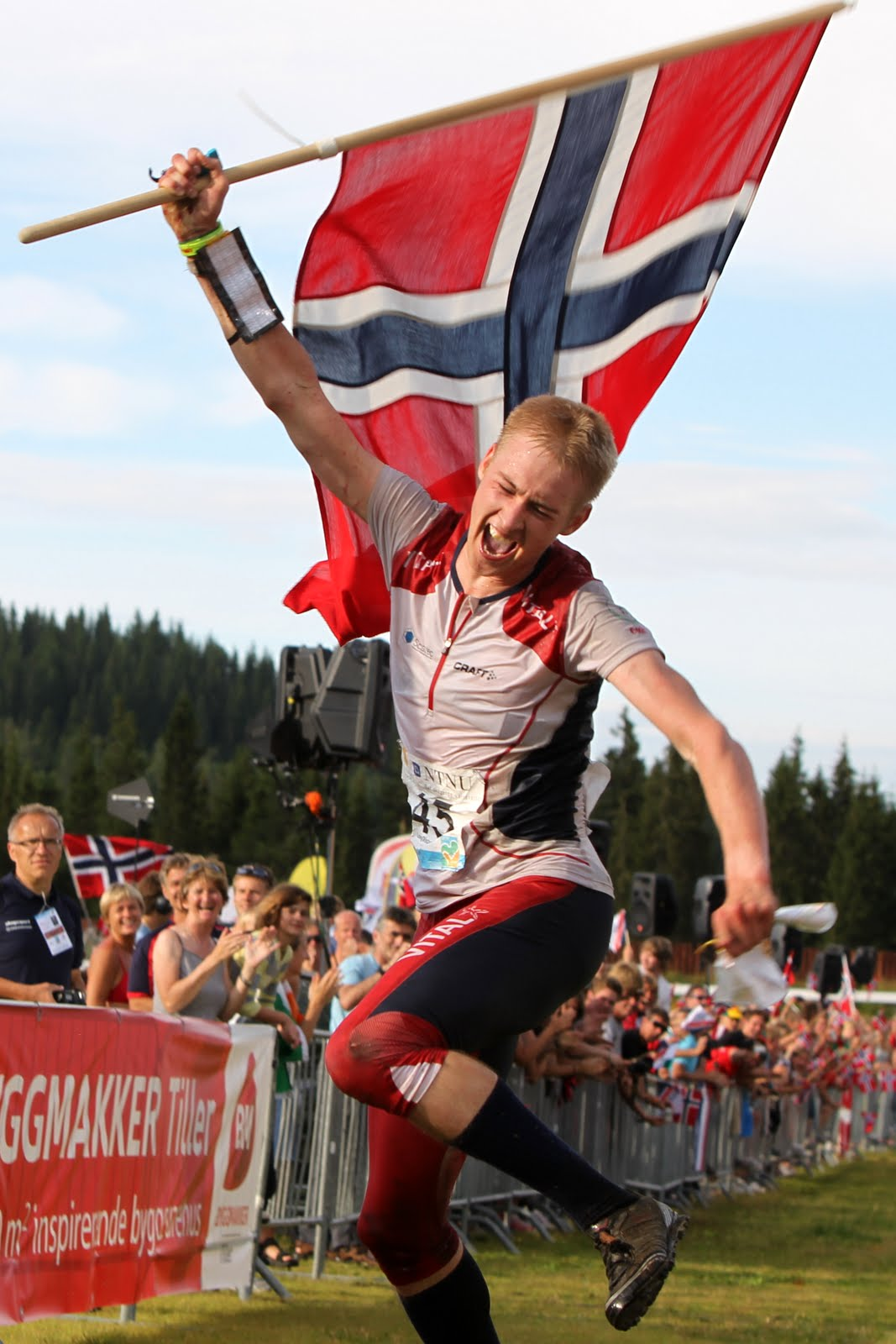
Lundanes, celebrating his victory in the long distance.

The 2010 World Orienteering Championships, the 27th World Orienteering Championships, were held in Trondheim, Norway, 8 –15 August 2010.

The championships had eight events; sprint for men and women, middle distance for men and women, long distance (formerly called individual or classic distance) for men and women, and relays for men and women.

== Medalists ==
Event	Gold		Silver	Bronze
Men's sprint	Matthias Müller (SUI)	16:10.9	Fabian Hertner (SUI)	Frederic Tranchand (FRA)
Women's sprint	Simone Niggli-Luder (SUI)	16:06.2	Helena Jansson (SWE)	Marianne Andersen (NOR)
Men's middle distance	Carl Waaler Kaas (NOR)	30:33	Peter Öberg (SWE)	Thierry Gueorgiou (FRA)
Women's middle distance	Minna Kauppi (FIN)	30:01	Simone Niggli-Luder (SUI)	Marianne Andersen (NOR)
Men's long distance	Olav Lundanes (NOR)	1:32:41	Anders Nordberg (NOR)	Thierry Gueorgiou (FRA)
Women's long distance	Simone Niggli-Luder (SUI)	1:12:49	Marianne Andersen (NOR)	Emma Claesson (SWE)
Men's relay		2:09:51		
Women's relay		1:59:04		
