= Martin Hubmann =

Swiss orienteering competitor

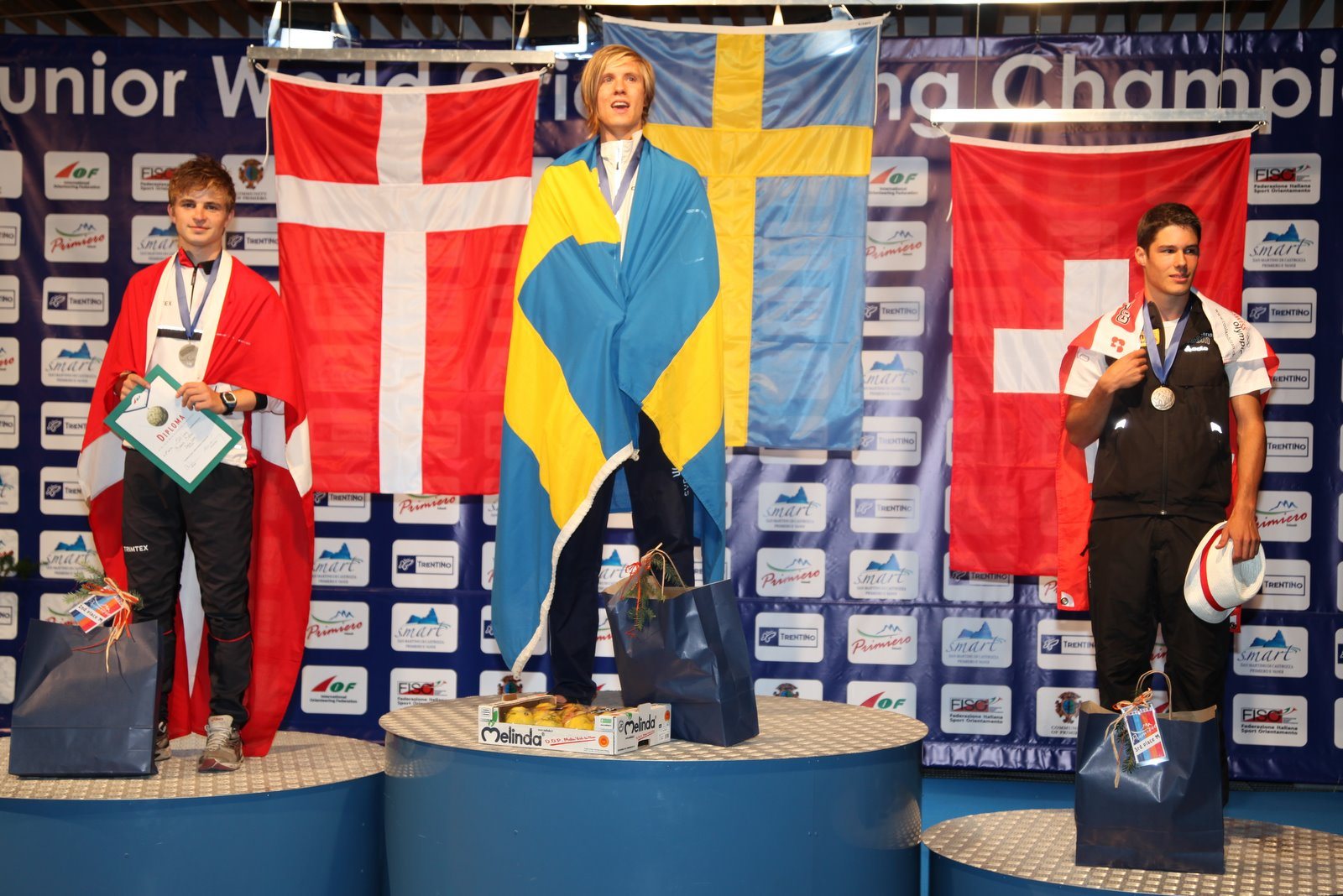
- Hubmann on the right hand side winning bronze at the 2009 Junior World Championships

Sport
- Sport: Orienteering
Medal record
Men's orienteering
Representing Switzerland
World Championships
Gold medal – first place	2014 Asiago-Lavarone	Sprint Relay
Silver medal – second place	2015 Inverness	Sprint
Silver medal – second place	2016 Strömstad	Mixed sprint relay
Bronze medal – third place	2017 Tartu	Mixed sprint relay
European Championships
Gold medal – first place	2012 Falun	Relay
Junior World Championships
Silver medal – second place	2009 Primiero	Relay
Bronze medal – third place	2009 Primiero	Sprint
Bronze medal – third place	2009 Primiero	Long
Bronze medal – third place	2007 Dubbo	Middle

Martin Hubmann (born 14 May 1989) is a Swiss orienteering competitor, world champion and European champion. He was a member of the relay team that won gold medals at the 2012 European Orienteering Championships in Falun. He won a gold medal in the sprint relay with the Swiss team at the 2014 World Orienteering Championships.

Hubmann is the younger brother of orienteering champion Daniel Hubmann.
