= List of World Orienteering Championships medalists (mixed events) =

This is a list of medalists in mixed events from the World Orienteering Championships orienteering.

== Sprint Relay ==
The first event was held in 2014.

Year	Gold	Silver	Bronze
2014	Switzerland Rahel Friederich; Martin Hubmann; Matthias Kyburz; Judith Wyder	Denmark Emma Klingenberg; Tue Lassen; Søren Bobach; Maja Alm	Russia Anastasiya Tikhonova; Gleb Tikhonov; Andrey Khramov; Galina Vinogradova
2015	Denmark Emma Klingenberg; Tue Lassen; Søren Bobach; Maja Alm	Norway Elise Egseth; Håkon Jarvis Westergård; Øystein Kvaal Østerbø; Anne Margrethe Hausken	Russia Tatiana Ryabkina; Gleb Tikhonov; Andrey Khramov; Galina Vinogradova
2016	Denmark Cecilie Friberg Klysner; Tue Lassen; Søren Bobach; Maja Møller Alm	Switzerland Rahel Friederich; Florian Howald; Martin Hubmann; Judith Wyder	Sweden Lina Strand; Gustav Bergman; Jonas Leandersson; Helena Jansson
2017	Sweden Helena Jansson; Jonas Leandersson; Jerker Lysell; Lina Strand	Denmark Maja Alm; Andreas Boesen; Tue Lassen; Cecilie Klysner	Switzerland Elena Roos; Florian Howald; Martin Hubmann; Sabine Hauswirth
2018	Sweden Tove Alexandersson; Emil Svensk; Jonas Leandersson; Karolin Ohlsson	Switzerland Elena Roos; Florian Howald; Fabian Hertner; Judith Wyder	Denmark Amanda Falck Weber; Tue Lassen; Jakob Edsen; Maja Alm
2021	Sweden Tove Alexandersson; Emil Svensk; Gustav Bergman; Sara Hagström	Norway Victoria Hæstad Bjørnstad; Audun Heimdal; Kasper Harlem Fosser; Andrine Benjaminsen	Switzerland Simona Aebersold; Joey Hadorn; Martin Hubmann; Elena Roos
2022	Sweden Lina Strand; Max Peter Bejmer; Gustav Bergman; Tove Alexandersson	United Kingdom Charlotte Ward; Ralph Street; Kris Jones; Megan Carter Davies	Norway Ane Dyrkorn; Lukas Liland; Kasper Harlem Fosser; Andrine Benjaminsen
2024	Switzerland Natalia Gemperle; Riccardo Rancan; Joey Hadorn; Simona Aebersold	Finland Maija Sianoja; Miika Kirmula; Tuomas Heikkila; Venla Harju	Norway Victoria Hæstad Bjørnstad; Eirik Langedal Breivik; Kasper Harlem Fosser; Andrine Benjaminsen
2026	Switzerland Natalia Gemperle; Tino Polsini; Fabian Aebersold; Simona Aebersold	Sweden Hanna Lundberg; Gustav Runefors; Isac von Krusenstierna; Karolin Ohlsson	Norway Victoria Hæstad Bjørnstad; Eirik Langedal Breivik; Kasper Harlem Fosser; Pia Young Vik

== Medal table ==
Table updated after the 2026 World Orienteering Championships.

Rank	Nation	Gold	Silver	Bronze	Total
1	Sweden	4	1	1	6
2	Switzerland	3	2	2	7
3	Denmark	2	2	1	5
4	Norway	0	2	3	5
5	Finland	0	1	0	1
5	Great Britain	0	1	0	1
7	Russia	0	0	2	2
Totals (7 entries)		9	9	9	27
