= Järla IF =

Swedish sports club

Järla IF FK
- Full name: Järla Idrottsförening Fotbollklubb
- Ground: Nacka IP; Nacka; Sweden
- Chairman: Catharina Conrad
- Coach: Oliver Gilford
- League: Division 4 Stockholm Mellersta
Home colours	Away colours

Järla IF is a Swedish sports club located in Nacka. It was formed on June 10 1914 and the club was transformed into an alliance association, each section serving as its own sports club.

== Football ==
=== Background ===
Järla IF FK currently plays in Division 4 Stockholm Mellersta which is the sixth tier of Swedish football. They play their home matches at the Nacka IP in Nacka.

The club is affiliated to Stockholms Fotbollförbund.

=== Season to season ===
In their most successful period Järla IF competed in the following divisions:

Season	Level	Division	Section	Position	Movements
1976	Tier 4	Division 4	Stockholm Södra	1st	Promoted
1977	Tier 3	Division 3	Östra Svealand	7th	
1978	Tier 3	Division 3	Östra Svealand	8th	
1979	Tier 3	Division 3	Östra Svealand	2nd	
1980	Tier 3	Division 3	Östra Svealand	5th	
1981	Tier 3	Division 3	Östra Svealand	1st	Promotion Playoffs
1982	Tier 3	Division 3	Östra Svealand	1st	Promotion Playoffs
1983	Tier 3	Division 3	Östra Svealand	3rd	
1984	Tier 3	Division 3	Östra Svealand	6th	
1985	Tier 3	Division 3	Östra Svealand	12th	Relegated
1986	Tier 4	Division 4	Stockholm Södra	7th	

In recent seasons Järla IF FK have competed in the following divisions:

Season	Level	Division	Section	Position	Movements
2006*	Tier 7	Division 5	Stockholm Mellersta	3rd	
2007	Tier 7	Division 5	Stockholm Mellersta	7th	
2008	Tier 7	Division 5	Stockholm Mellersta	1st	Promoted
2009	Tier 6	Division 4	Stockholm Mellersta	8th	
2010	Tier 6	Division 4	Stockholm Mellersta	6th	
2011	Tier 6	Division 4	Stockholm Mellersta		

* League restructuring in 2006 resulted in a new division being created at Tier 3 and subsequent divisions dropping a level.

== Orienteering ==
The orienteering section was formed in 1923 and it has a house in Hästhagen close to Nackareservatet north to Källtorpssjön.

The club won the women's relay in 10-mila in 2018 with Stina Haraldsson, Emma Klingenberg, Sara Sjökvist, Elin Hemmyr Skantze and Karolin Ohlsson.
