= Ida Bobach =

Danish orienteering competitor

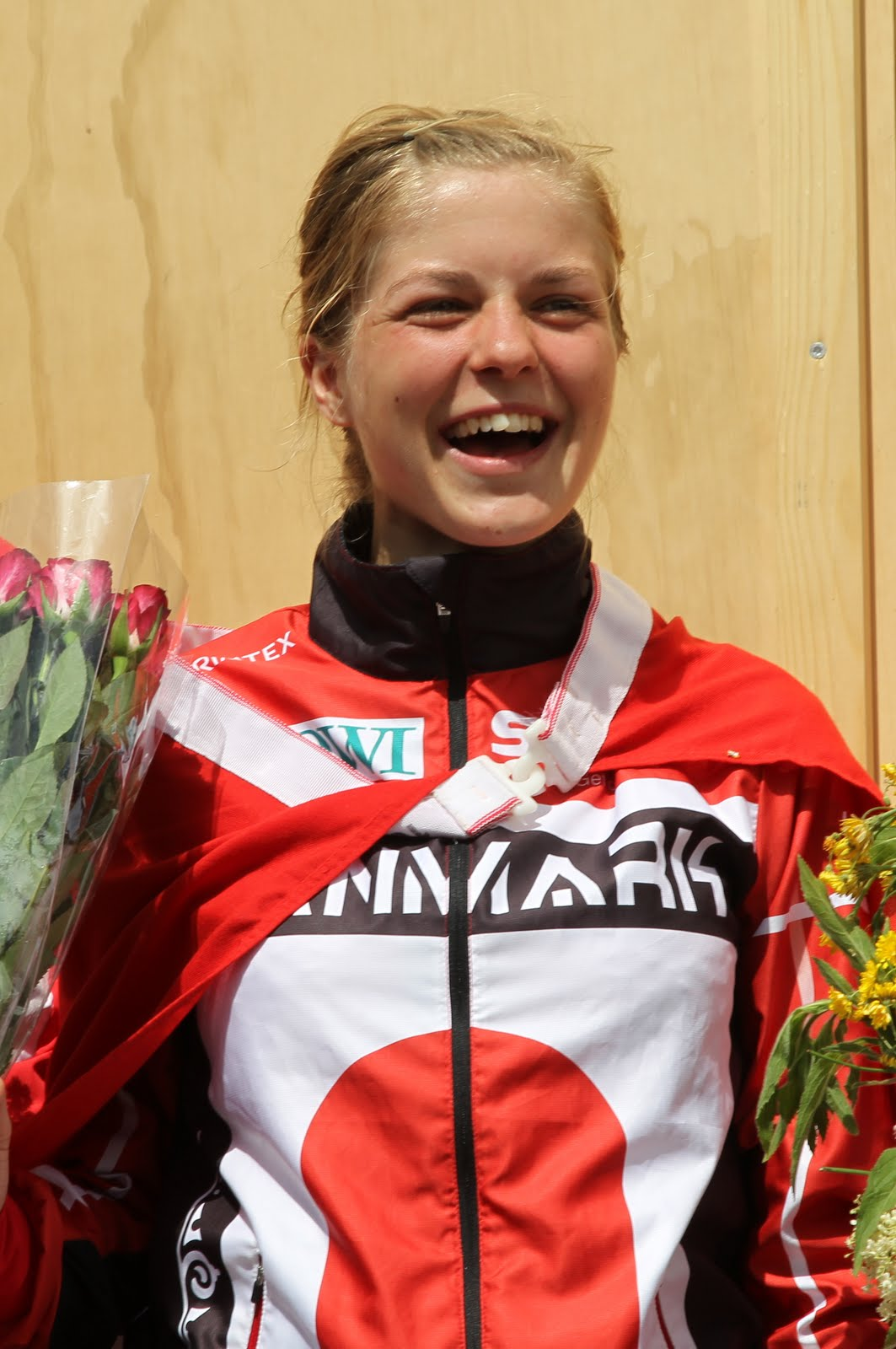
- Bobach at JWOC 2010

Personal information
- Nationality: Danish
- Born: 30 July 1991 (age 34) Silkeborg, Denmark

Sport
- Sport: Orienteering
Medal record
Women's orienteering
Representing Denmark
World Championships
Gold medal – first place	2015 Inverness	Long
Gold medal – first place	2015 Inverness	Relay
Silver medal – second place	2011 Savoie	Middle
Silver medal – second place	2014 Trentino-Veneto	Middle
Silver medal – second place	2014 Trentino-Veneto	Relay
Silver medal – second place	2016 Strömstad-Tanum	Relay
World Games
Silver medal – second place	2013 Cali	Relay
Junior World Championships
Silver medal – second place	2008 Göteborg	Relay
Gold medal – first place	2009 Rolle Pass	Long
Silver medal – second place	2009 Imèr-Mezzano	Sprint
Bronze medal – third place	2009 San Martino di Castrozza	Middle
Bronze medal – third place	2009 Primiero	Relay
Gold medal – first place	2010 Aalborg	Sprint
Gold medal – first place	2010 Aalborg	Long
Gold medal – first place	2010 Aalborg	Relay
Gold medal – first place	2011 Lębork	Sprint
Gold medal – first place	2011 Wejherowo	Long
Gold medal – first place	2011 Wejherowo	Middle
Bronze medal – third place	2011 Gniewowo	Relay

Ida Bobach (born 30 July 1991 in Silkeborg) is a Danish orienteering competitor who was Junior World Champion in 2009, and became triple Junior World Champion from 2010, when she won the sprint, long distance and the relay. She represents the club OK Pan Århus, and since 2007, has received training from Danish national coach Lars Lindstrøm. In 2015 she won gold medals at the World Championships in the long and Relay.

== Junior career ==
=== 2006 ===
Bobach participated at the Junior World Orienteering Championships in Druskininkai in 2006, where she placed 49th in the sprint, 20th in the middle, and 49th in the long distance. Her older brother Søren Bobach became a Junior World Champion in 2006.

=== 2007 ===
She also represented Denmark at the 2007 Junior World Orienteering Championships in Dubbo, where she placed 25th in the sprint, 19th in the middle, and 33rd in the long distance.

=== 2008 ===
At the 2008 Junior World Orienteering Championships in Gothenburg she participated on the Danish relay team that won silver medals, along with Signe Klinting and Maja Alm. She placed 14th in the sprint, 45th in the middle distance, and 22nd in the long distance.

=== 2009 ===
At the 2009 Junior World Orienteering Championships in Trentino she won medals in all four competitions, including a gold medal in the long distance. In the long distance she was over a minute ahead of Jenny Lönnkvist, who placed second. She won a silver medal in the sprint, a bronze medal in the middle, and a bronze medal with the Danish relay team, which consisted of Emma Klingenberg and Signe Klinting, in addition to Bobach.

=== 2010 ===
At the 2010 Junior World Orienteering Championships in Aalborg she won three gold medals. She won individual gold medals in the sprint and in the long distance. She was a member of the Danish relay team together with Emma Klingenberg and Signe Klinting, and they won the relay ahead of the Czech team. She did also participate in the middle distance, but at the qualification she twisted her ankle, and wasn't able to run the Final.

=== 2011 ===
At the 2011 Junior World Orienteering Championships she won the gold medal in the sprint competition, which was held in Lębork. For a third time in a row she won the gold medal on the long distance and scored a hattrick by winning a gold medal in the middeldistance, and there by the first ever to win all the individual distances. Long and middle distance were held in Wejherowo. In the relay, which was held in Gniewowo, she took the bronze along with Emma Klingenberg and Ita Klingenberg, after a very exciting ending.

== Senior career ==
=== 2010 ===
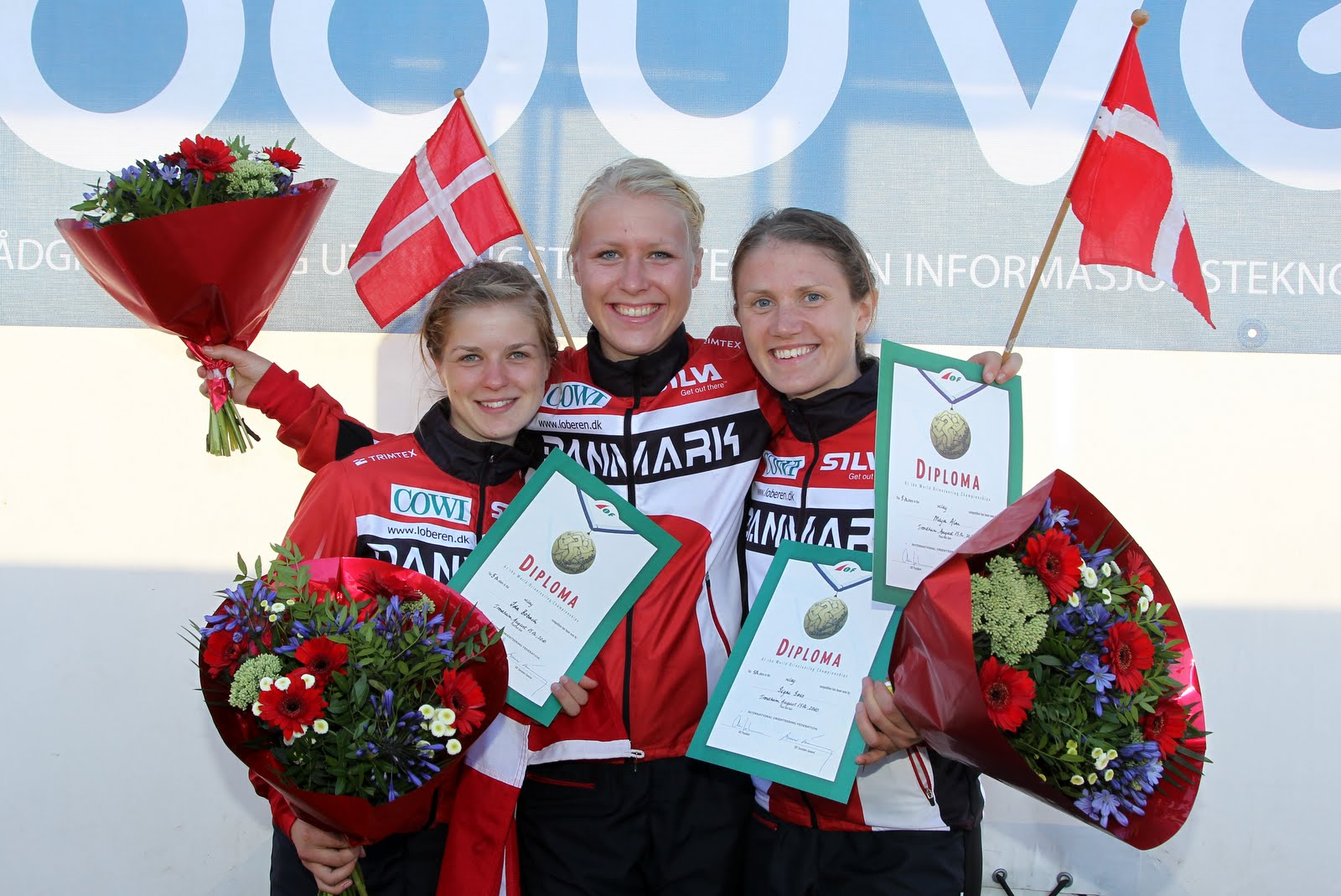
Danish team (Ida Bobach, Maja Alm, Signe Søes) at the prize giving ceremony Relay at WOC 2010

At the club competition Tiomila in 2010 she competed for her club Ulricehamns OK. She was running the first leg for Ulricehamns, winning her leg. In the end Ulricehamns OK placed second, in a field of more than 300 women's teams.

While still a junior, Bobach was selected to represent Denmark at the 2010 senior World Orienteering Championships in Trondheim. She qualified for the final on the middle distance, and placed 13th in the middle distance final among 45 starters. She was also running the first leg for the Danish relay team. The Danish team placed fifth among 28 teams, behind Finland, Norway, Sweden and Switzerland, and before Czech Republic, France, Great Britain and Russia.

=== 2011 ===
Ida did also participate in the WOC 2011 in France (still as a junior), where she made the best result for a Danish woman since 1974: She won a silver medal in the middle distance.

=== 2014 ===
During the WOC 2014 those took place in Trentino and Veneto Ida won silver medals in the middle distance and in the relay with Emma Klingenberg and Maja Alm.

=== 2015 ===
In 2015 Bobach had her most successful season yet, as she won both the Long distance and the Relay at the world championships in Inverness, running with Maja Alm and Emma Klingenberg.
