= Ruslan Glebov =

Ukrainian orienteering competitor

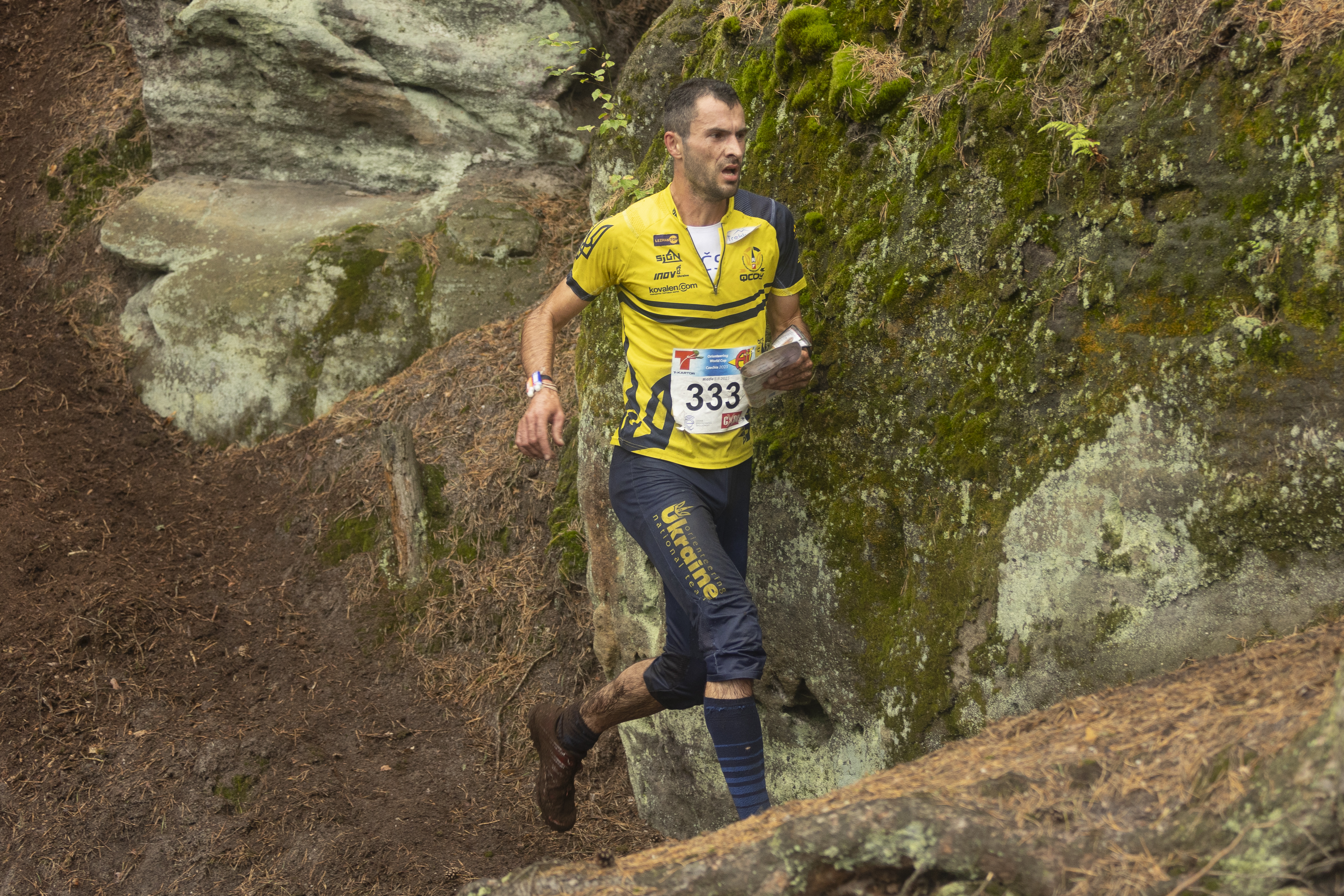

Personal information
- Native name: Руслан Глібов
- Born: 28 January 1987 (age 39) Dnipro, Ukrainian SSR, Soviet Union

Sport
- Sport: Orienteering
- Club: Nash Klub (UKR); OK Ravinen (SWE); Turun Metsänkävijät (FIN)
Medal record
Men's orienteering
Representing Ukraine
World Championships
Silver medal – second place	2018 Latvia	Long
Bronze medal – third place	2021 Czech Republic	Middle
Junior World Championships
Bronze medal – third place	2006 Lithuania	Sprint

Ruslan Glebov, also known as Ruslan Glibov (born 1987), is a Ukrainian orienteering competitor. He was born in Dnipro, Ukraine.

== Career ==
He has competed at the 2008, 2009, 2012, 2014, 2015, 2016, 2017, and 2018 World Orienteering Championships, and his best result until 2018 was a fifth place in the mixed relay in 2014.

He won a silver medal in the long distance at the 2018 World Orienteering Championships in Latvia, behind Olav Lundanes. In 2021, he won a bronze medal in the Middle Distance discipline, held in the Czech Republic.

Ruslan also holds an overall title in the 5-days tour O-ringen after winning the 2019 edition. O-ringen is widely considered the most prestigious event outside of championship level.

His achievements as junior include a bronze medal in the sprint at the 2006 Junior World Orienteering Championships in Lithuania.
