= Paimion Rasti =

Finnish orienteering club

Paimion Rasti is a Finnish orienteering club in Paimio.

It organised the Jukola relay in 2015 together with Turun Suunnistajat.

Daniel Stenlund, Jesse Laukkarinen, Fredric Portin and Olav Lundanes won the Finnish Championships in relay in 2017.

Paimion Rasti's team got a bronze medal in the Jukola Relay in 2018 with Daniel Stenlund, Jesse Laukkarinen, Fredric Portin, Vili Niemi, Bartosz Pawlak, Frédéric Tranchand and Olav Lundanes.

Other runners are Aleksandra Hornik and Nicolas Rio, which came from Pan-Kristianstad in 2019.
