= Hästhagen =

Hästhagen may refer to:

- Hästhagen, Nacka Municipality – a locality in Stockholm County, Sweden
- Hästhagen, Malmö – a neighbourhood in Malmö, Skåne County, Sweden
