= Viktor Svensk =

Swedish orienteering competitor

Personal information
- Nationality: Swedish
- Born: 2001 (age 24–25)
- Relatives: Emil Svensk (brother)

Sport
- Sport: Orienteering
- Club: Stora Tuna OK
Medal record
Representing Sweden
Men's orienteering
European Championships
Silver medal – second place	2022 Rakvere	Relay
Silver medal – second place	2024 Mór	Relay
Junior World Championships
Gold medal – first place	2021 Kocaeli	Relay
Silver medal – second place	2021 Kocaeli	Middle

Viktor Svensk (born 2001) is a Swedish orienteering competitor who represents club Stora Tuna OK.

== Orienteering career ==
=== Junior years ===
In 2021 Svensk won a silver medal in the middle distance at the Junior World Orienteering Championships in Turkey. He was also part of the Swedish team winning gold in the relay, along with Noel Braun and Axel Elmblad.

=== Senior career ===
Svensk won a silver medal in the relay at the 2022 European Orienteering Championships, along with Isac von Krusenstierna and Max Peter Bejmer.

In May 2024 Svensk helped his club Stora Tuna OK to win the 2024 Tiomila relay.

In August he placed eighth in the long distance at the 2024 European Orienteering Championships in Hungary. The next day he placed sixth in the long distance at the championships, and two days later he won a silver medal in the relay with the Swedish team, along with Albin Ridefelt and Emil Svensk.

He finished 5th in the World Orienteering Championships 2025 - Long distance, just after his brother Emil Svensk.

== Personal life ==
Viktor Svensk is born in 2001. He is a brother of international orienteer Emil Svensk.
