= OK Ravinen =

Swedish orienteering club

OK Ravinen is a Swedish orienteering club in Nacka founded in 1950. Its house is located in Nackareservatet near Källtorpssjön.

It has won the Tiomila relay in 1977, 1979, 1981 and the women's relay in 1979, 1980 and 1981. Its team came third in Tiomila in 1958.

The club won the Swedish championships in relay in 1978, 1979 and 1980.

Björn Rosendahl, Gustav Bergman, Helena Bergman, Annichen Kringstad and Ruslan Glebov have run for the club.
