= Ikaalisten Nouseva-Voima =

Finnish orienteering club

Ikaalisten Nouseva-Voima, Nouski, is Finnish orienteering club from Ikaalinen.

The club got a silver medal in 10-mila in 1975 with Kimmo Rauhamäki on the last leg, where Rolf Pettersson from Hagaby GoIF managed to keep him away. It came on second place also in 1980.

Its team came second in the Finnish Championship in relay in 2019. However it won the final in Viestiliiga in Nousiainen the same year.

The club also organises a trail run with classes up to 20 kilometers.

Other runners from club are: Vladimir Aleksejev, Ari Anjala, Topi Anjala, Outi Borgenström, Terhi Holster, Mikhail Mamlejev, Marius Mazulis, Leena Mutka and Simo Nurminen.
