= Stora Tuna OK =

Orienteering club

- Full name: Stora Tuna orienteringsklubb
- Sport: orienteering
- Founded: 2008
- Based in: Borlänge, Sweden

Stora Tuna OK is a Swedish orienteering club in Borlänge. It was the orienteering section of Stora Tuna IK until 2009.

Tove Alexandersson, Julia Jakob, Annichen Kringstad, Magdalena Olsson, Emil Svensk and Marie Olaussen are all orienteers that have run for Stora Tuna OK.

== Merits ==
- Winner Tiomila (Tiomila relay): 1964, 2024
- Winner Tiomila (women's relay): 1982, 1984, 2008, 2017, 2024
- Winner Tiomila (youth relay): 2006, 2007, 2016
- Winner Jukola relay: 2019, 2021, 2022, 2023, 2024, 2025
- Winner Venla relay: 1982, 1984, 1995, 2018, 2024
- Winner 25-manna: 1983, 1991, 2010
- Swedish Championship, relay: 2018

== Relays ==
=== Tiomila ===
Rune Sund, Anders Thunström, Göran Berglund, Seppo Simonen, Bertil Jansson, Hans Nordström, Lars Arvidsson, Jan Limell, Håkan Rystedt and Kenneth Hindsberg won the Tiomila relay in 1964.

Anne Bössfall, Karin Gunnarsson, Gunilla Lundström, Ylva Grape, Annichen Kringstad won the women's relay in Tiomila in 1982. Nearly the same team (with Ingrid Lentz instead of Gunilla Lundström) won again in 1984.

Lena Gillgren, Anna Mårsell, Juliette Soulard, Emma Engstrand, and Lena Eliasson won in 2008. In 2017 the winning team consisted of Anna Mårsell, Magdalena Olsson, Julia Gross, Frida Sandberg and Tove Alexandersson.

In the 2024 Tiomila relay, Stora Tuna took the double by winning both the men's and the women's relay.

=== Venla 2018 ===
Tove Alexandersson, Julia Jakob, Anna Mårsell and Magdalena Olsson won the Venla relay in 2018.

=== Jukola 2019 ===
Jukola 2019 Stora Tuna OK Standing
Leg	Runner	time after	placing
1	Jesper Svensk	+8	4
2	Henrik Johannesson	+7	3
3	Olle Kalered	+6	2
4	Joakim Svensk	+5	3
5	Viktor Svensk	+1:13	2
6	Anton Sjökvist	+4	2
7	Emil Svensk	+0	1
