= Vincent Coupat =

French orienteering competitor

Personal information
- Born: 19 February 1986 (age 40)

Sport
- Sport: Orienteering
Medal record
Men's orienteering
Representing France
World Championships
Bronze medal – third place	2015 Inverness	Relay

Vincent Coupat (born 19 February 1986) is a French orienteering competitor.

He won a bronze medal with the French relay team at the 2015 World Orienteering Championships in Inverness.

He competed at the 2016 World Orienteering Championships in Strömstad, where he placed 20th in the long distance, and also qualified for the sprint final.
