= Gustavsbergs OK =

Swedish orienteering club

Gustavsbergs OK is a Swedish orienteering club in Gustavsberg.

It was a section established in 1948 in Gustavsbergs IF until 2005, when it became an independent association. The first club championships in orienteering were held in 1927.

The club won 10-mila in 1978 and 1980. Björn Nordin, Magnus Haraldsson, Arne Johansson, Anders Nilsson and Göran Andersson have run for the club.
