= Signe Klinting =

Danish orienteering competitor

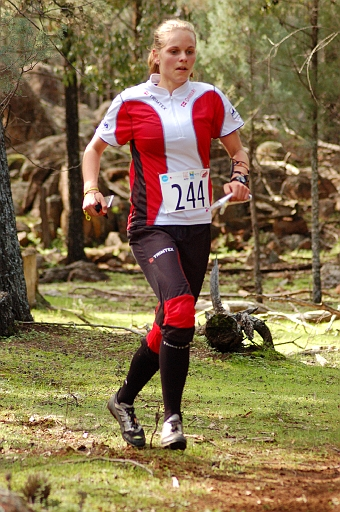
- Klinting at JWOC 2007

Medal record

Women's orienteering

Representing Denmark

World Championships
Silver medal – second place	2016 Strömstad-Tanum	Relay

Junior World Championships
Gold medal – first place	2010 Aalborg	Relay
Silver medal – second place	2008 Göteborg	Relay
Bronze medal – third place	2006 Druskininkai	Middle
Bronze medal – third place	2009 Primiero	Relay

Signe Klinting (born April 17, 1990) is a Danish orienteering competitor and medalist from the junior world championships.

She received a silver medal in relay at the Junior World Orienteering Championships in Gothenburg in 2008, together with Ida Bobach and Maja Alm, and received an individual bronze medal in the middle distance at the 2006 championships in Druskininkai.

== See also ==
- Danish orienteers
- List of orienteers
- List of orienteering events
