= IKHP Huskvarna =

Swedish sports club

IKHP Huskvarna, previously IK Hakarpspojkarna, is a Swedish sports club in Huskvarna, founded on 1 February 1929. It is active in orienteering, cross-country skiing, mountain biking, triathlon, and athletics.

== Orienteering ==
The club won the Swedish championships in relay in 1966, 1968, 1970 and 1971 with Mats Hagvall, Stig Karlsmo, Göran Öhlund, Anders Sellgren, Gunnar Öhlund and Stefan Green. In 1973 its team came second.

The club won Tiomila in 1969, 1970, 1974 and 1995.

Apart from winning Tiomila in 1995, Johan Ivarsson became Swedish Champion in middle distance in 1999.

The club won 25-manna in 1994 after beating Angelniemen Ankkuri. The last two runners were the couple Hanne Sandstad and Johan Ivarsson.
