= Nyköpings OK =

Swedish orienteering clu

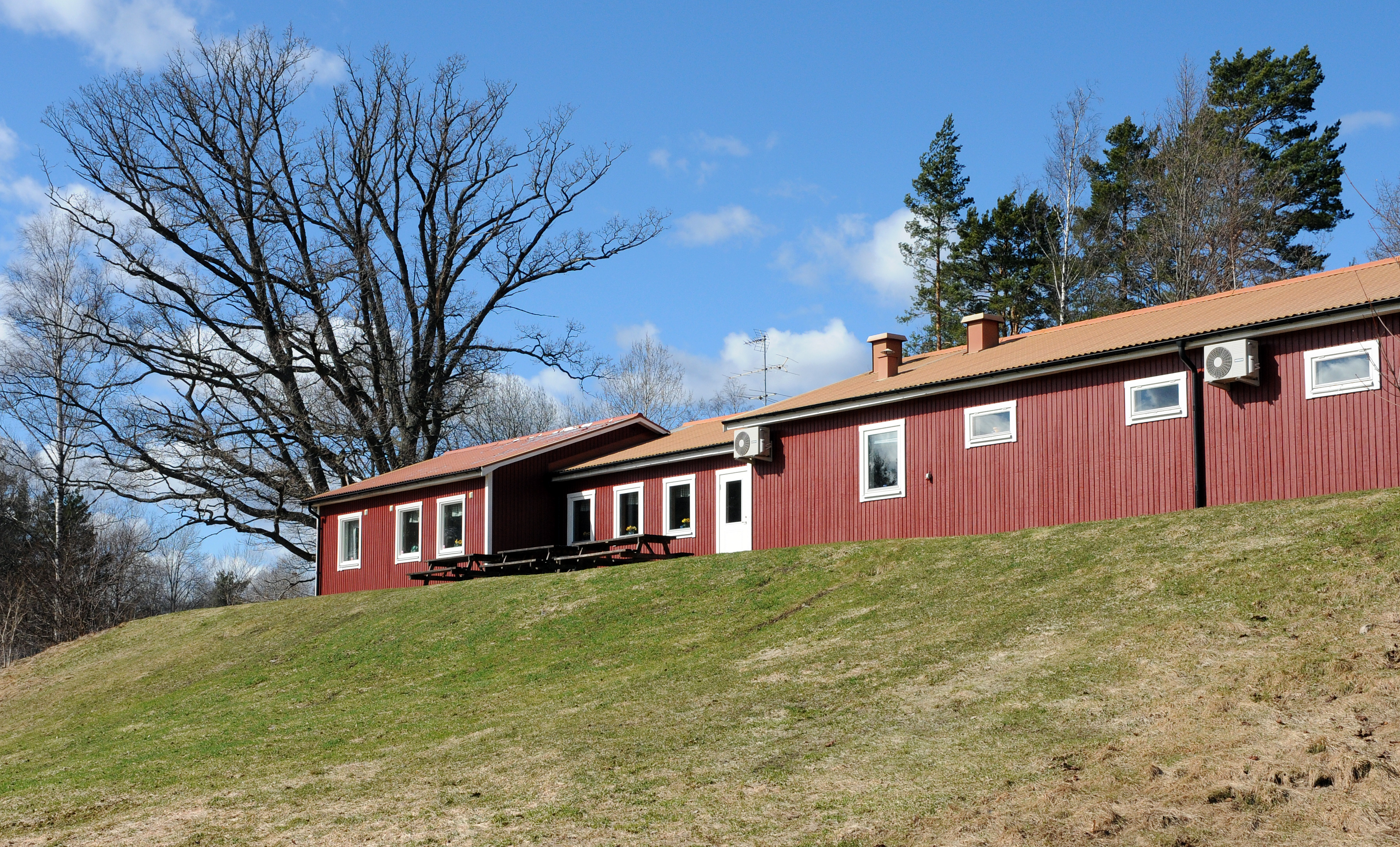
Nyköpings OK

Nyköpings OK is a Swedish orienteering club in Nyköping. It was founded in 1958 when the orienteering section of Nyköpings SK became an independent association.

Its team won Tiomila in 1958 thanks to Kalle Johansson in the second last leg. In 1957 it became fourth.

Knut Nord won the class for older juniors (ÄJ) in the Swedish Championships in 1971. Other runners are Philip Carlsson, who went to the Youth European Championship in Hrodna in 2019 after having won four bronzes (middle, long, night and relay) in the men-18 class in the Swedish Championships, and Jens Wängdahl, who got a bronze in the Junior World Championships in 2013 at the age of 19.
