= Hagaby GoIF =

Swedish sport club

Hagaby GoIF is a Swedish sport club from Örebro competing in orienteering.

The club won 10-mila in 1975 with Ingemar Larsson, Anders Winbladh, Ola Lindskog, Tord Lidström, Stefan Blomgren, Billy Höglund, Arne Yngström, Anders Bergman, Göran Hedberg, Rolf Pettersson. Rolf Pettersson raced against Kimmo Rauhamäki from Ikaalisten Nouseva-Voima on the last leg.

In 1976 the team with Arne Salomonsson, Ola Lindskog, Jan Carlsson, Stefan Blomgren, Anders Winbladh, Billy Höglund, Erik Oskarsson, Anders Bergman, Rolf Pettersson and Göran Hedberg won again 10-mila.
