= Troy de Haas =

Australian orienteering competitor

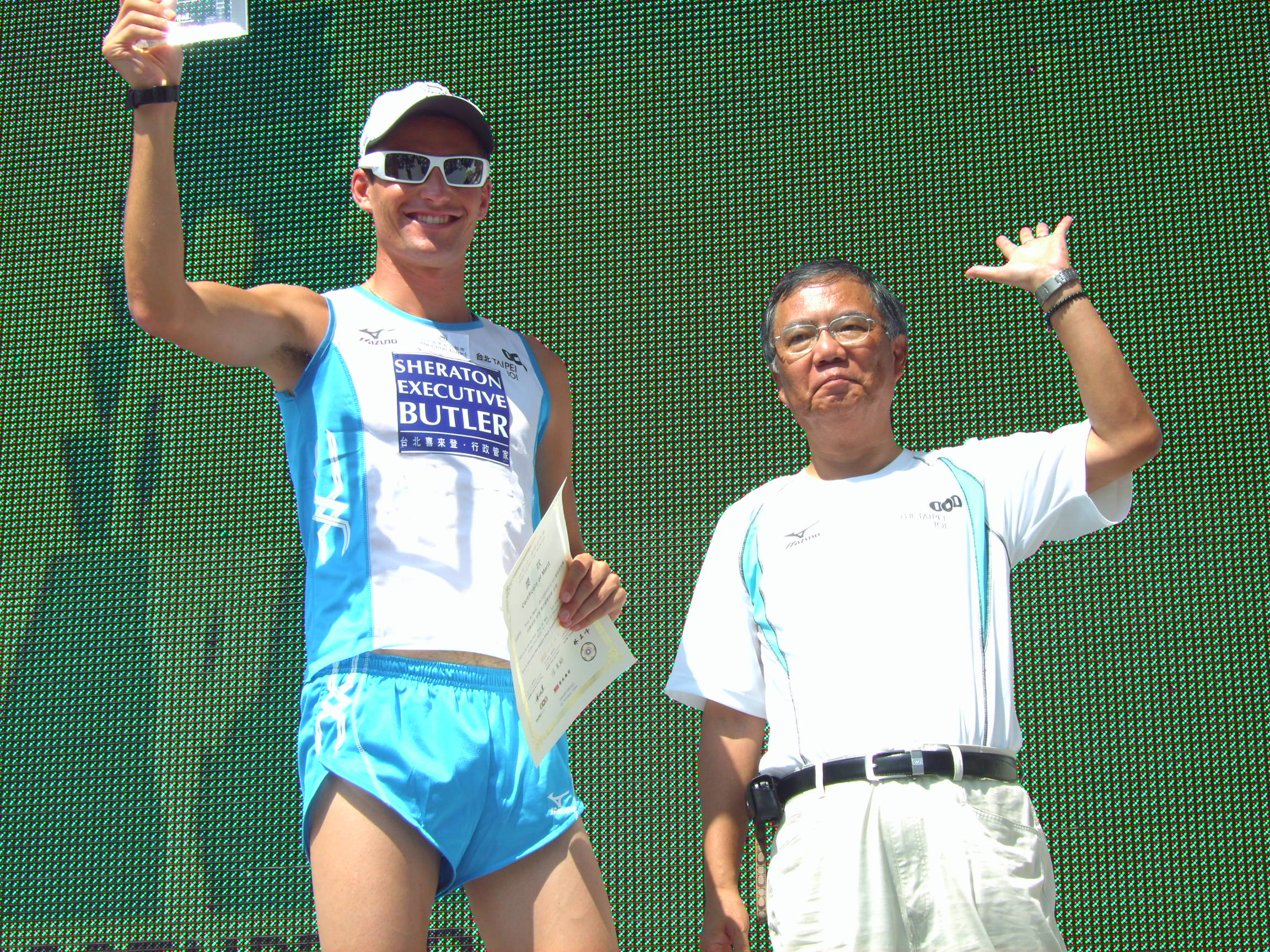
- Troy de Haas in 2006

Medal record

Men's orienteering

Representing Australia

Junior World Championships
Bronze medal – third place	1999 Varna	Long

Troy de Haas (born 15 June 1979) is an Australian tower running, mountain running and orienteering competitor.

In 1999 he won a bronze medal in the long event at the Junior World Orienteering Championships in Varna, Bulgaria. It was the first ever medal to be won by a non-European at the international level in the sport of Orienteering.

In 2006 he achieved Australia's best ever men's result at a Senior World Orienteering Championships placing 7th in the sprint event in Nagoya, Japan. He was also a member of Australia's relay team that placed 6th at the 2001 World Championships in Tampere, Finland.

The world's biggest relay event, Jukola, was won by Turun Suunnistajat in 2001 with Troy running the 'long night' leg for the team. He was the first non-European to ever win Jukola.

In later years he has placed at national mountain running championships and international tower running races including Q1 (building), Fernsehturm Stuttgart, Swissotel The Stamford Singapore and Taipei 101.

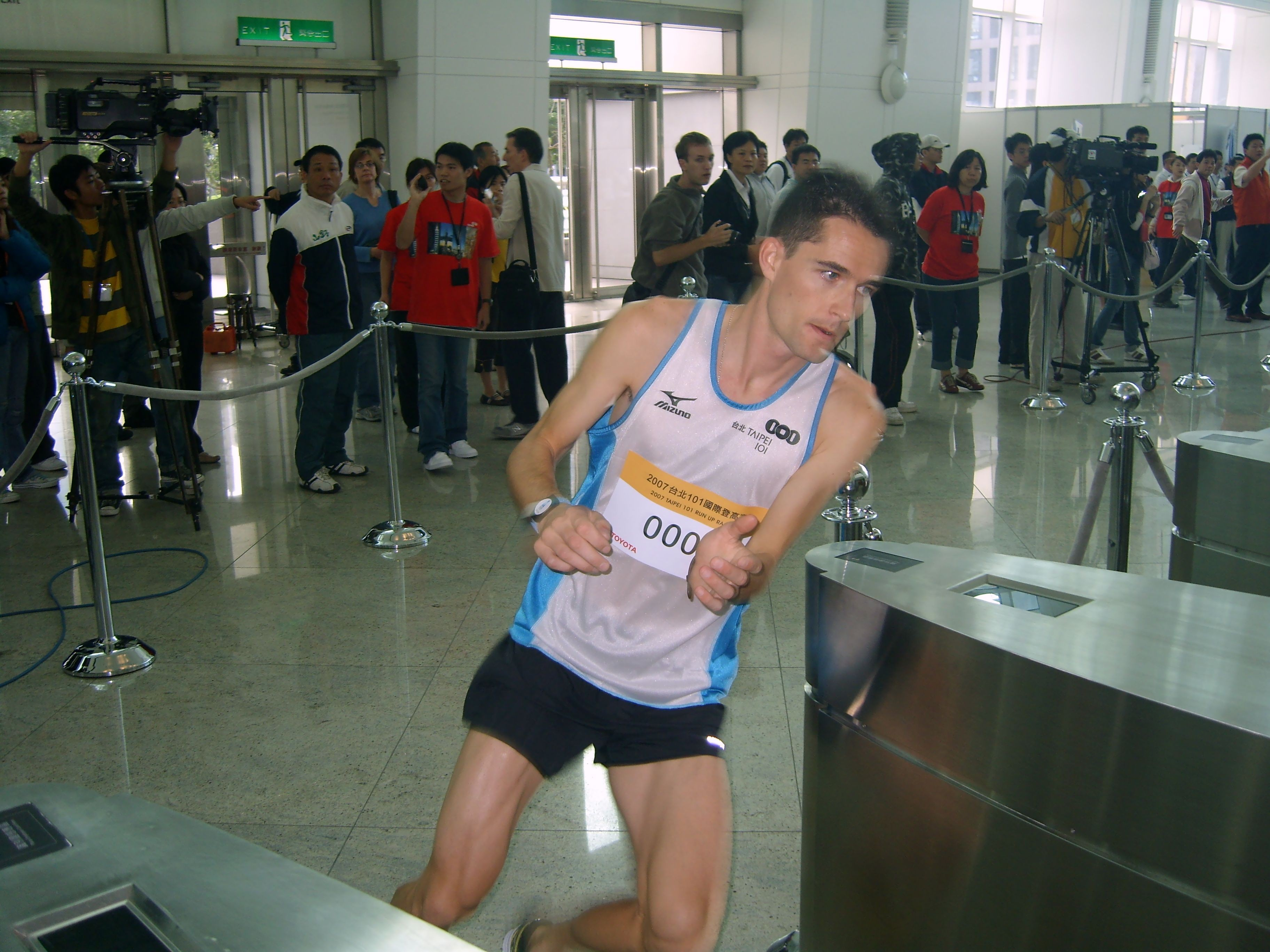

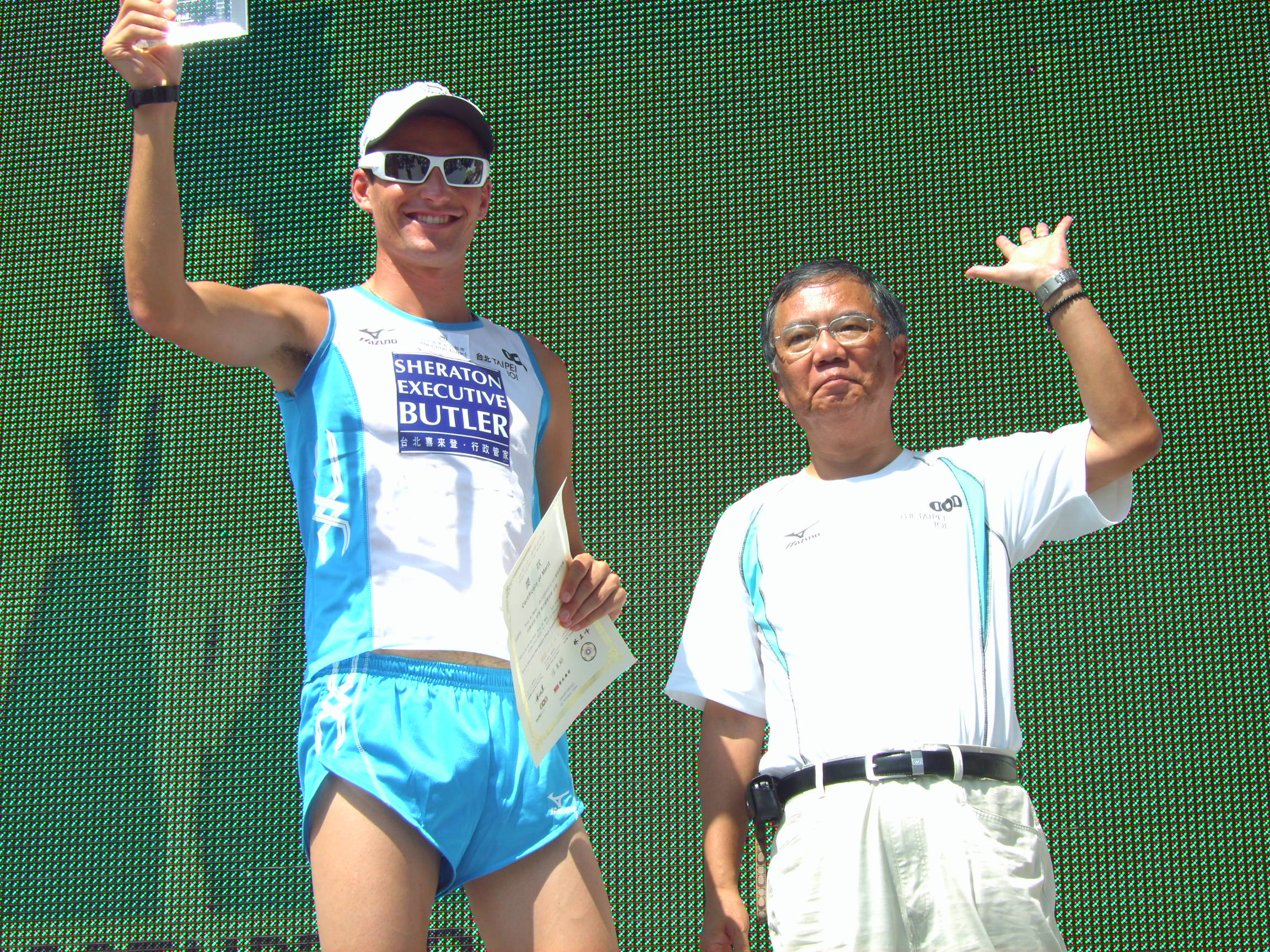

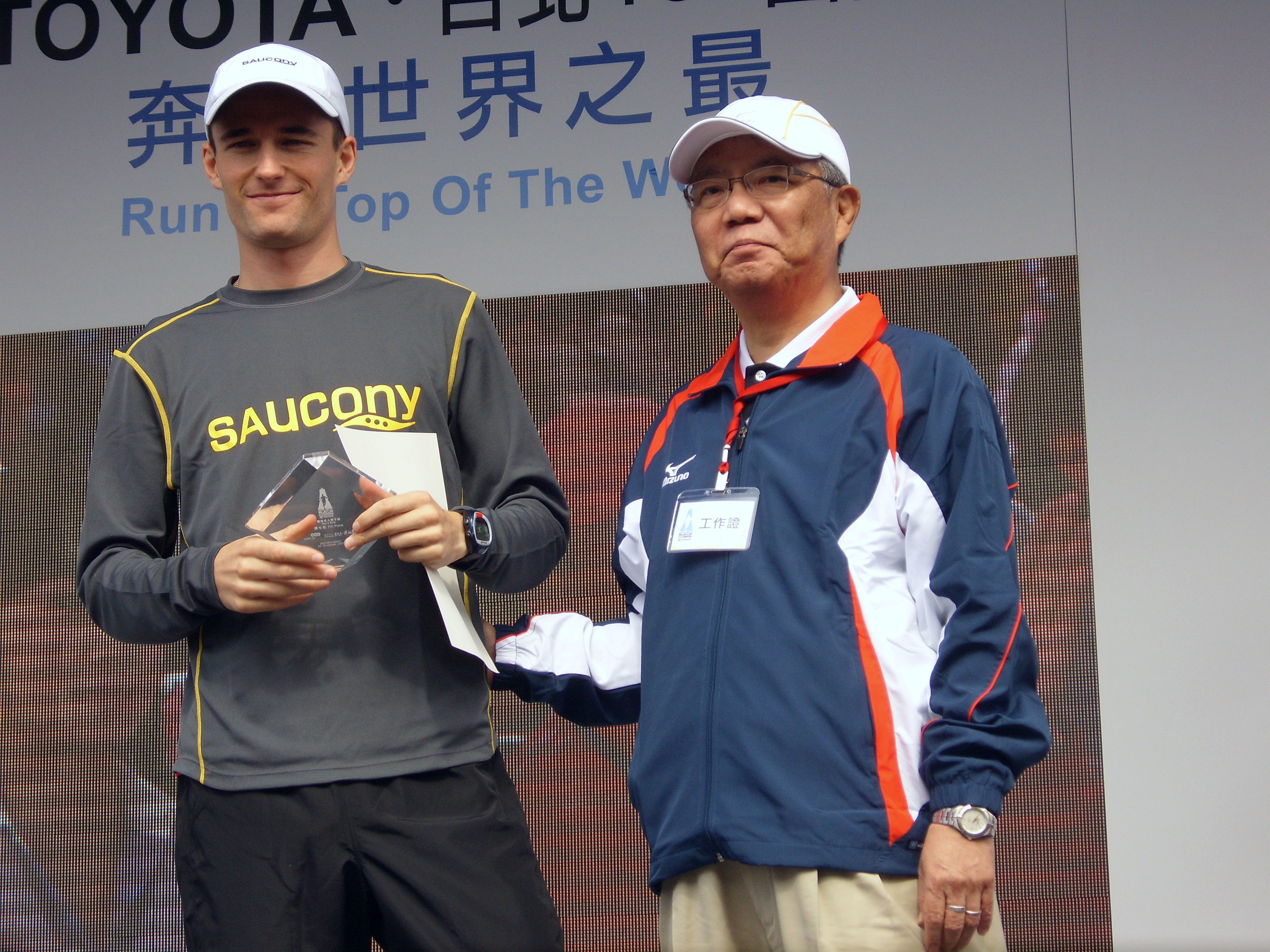

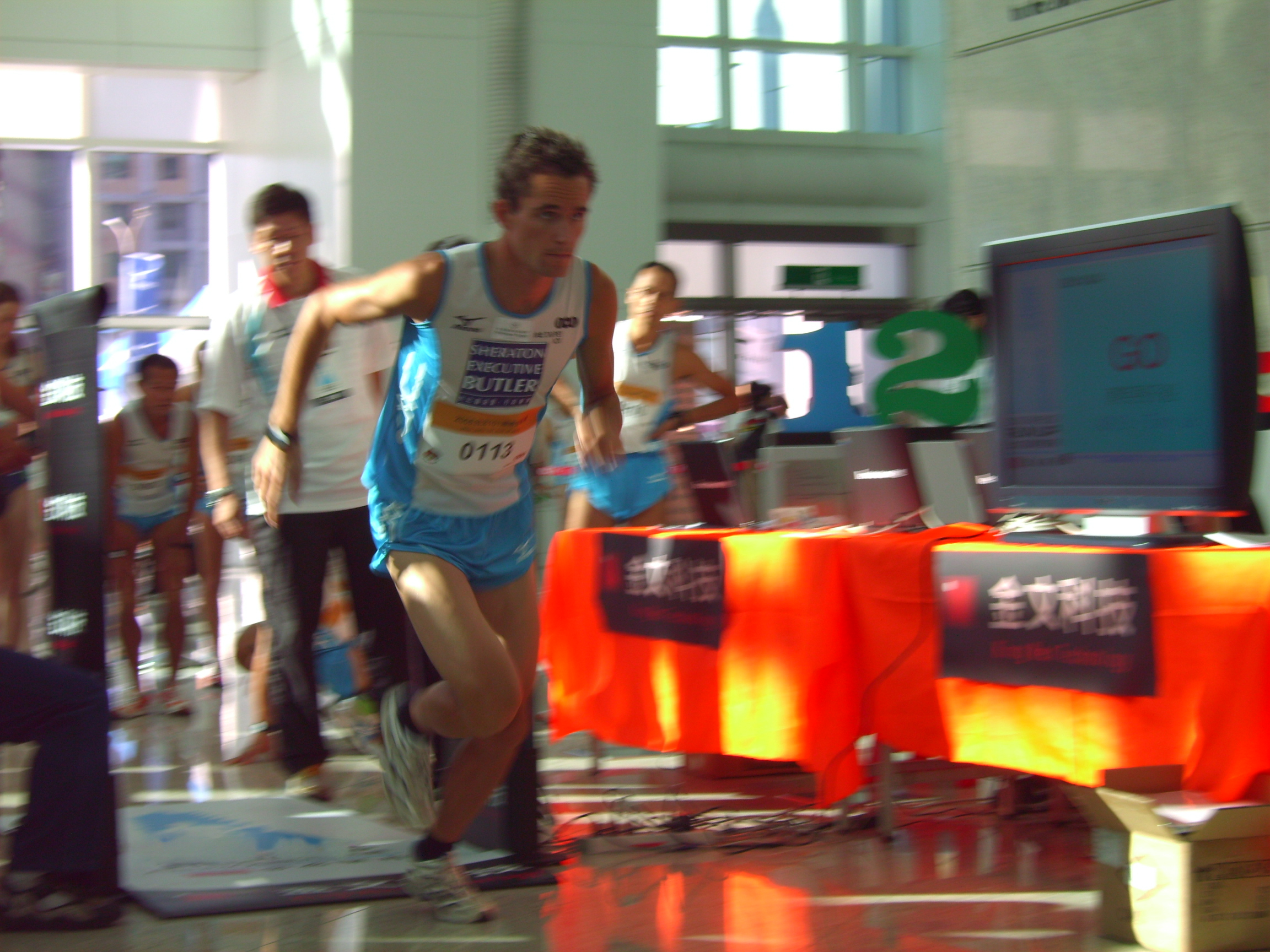

== See also ==
- List of orienteers
- List of orienteering events
