= Arboga OK =

Swedish orienteering club

Arboga OK is a Swedish orienteering club in Arboga founded in 1945.

In 1953 and 1955 it won the Tiomila relay. Its team got a bronze medal in Tiomila in 1966.

The club also won the Swedish championships in relay in 1962 with Arvid Imark, Hans Ekberg, Lennart Öberg.

Ekberg became also Swedish champion in 1963 and in 1965 for daytime and night orienteering respectively.
