= Kalevan Rasti =

Finnish orienteering club

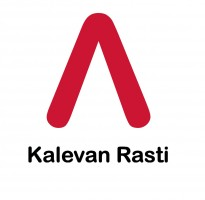
Logo

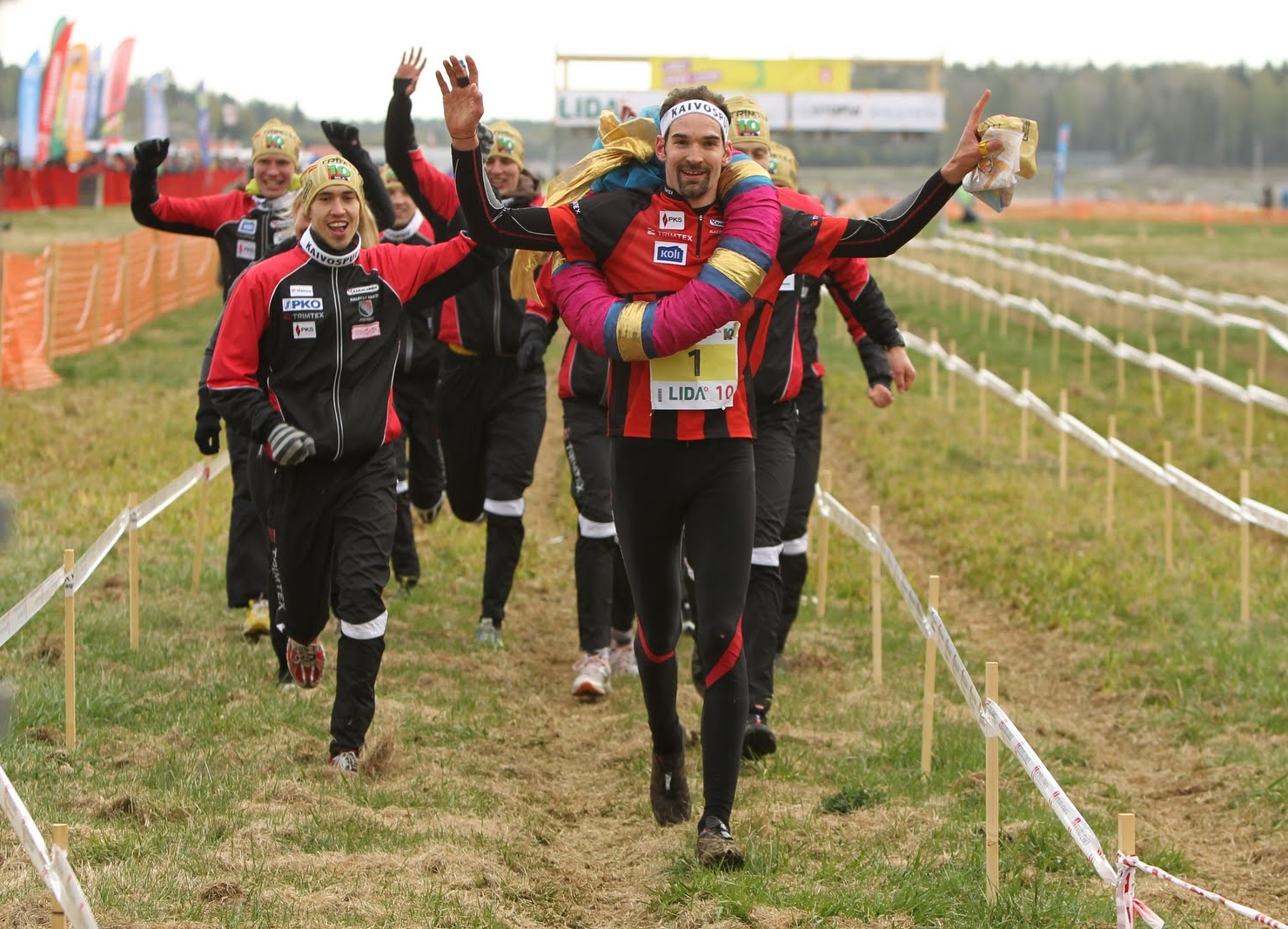
Tiomila winners, 2011

Kalevan Rasti is an orienteering club based in Finland. Recently it has been one of the most successful clubs in world orienteering, winning the Jukola and Tiomila relays multiple times.

The club won the Tiomila relay in 1983 with Risto Vairinen, Timo Ikonen, Timo Alapiha, Pasi Ikonen, Urpo Väänänen, Jussi Silvennoinen, Arto Muhonen, Markku Piironen, Hannu Pulli and Mika Ruuhiala in the team. It won also in 2010, 2011, 2013 and 2014. Then Mika Hernelahti, Aaro Asikainen, Jan Procházka, Tommi Tölkkö, Hannu Airila, Jere Pajunen, Adam Chromy, Philippe Adamski, Fabian Hertner, Thierry Gueorgiou, Kiril Nikolov, Simo Martomaa, Antti Nurminen, Simo-Pekka Fincke and Jarkko Houvila were part of those teams.

It won the Jukola three times in a row between 2012 and 2014. Their notable orienteers include Thierry Gueorgiou, who has run last leg for the club for more than 10 years. The club has also included notable orienteers as Sara Lüscher.
