= Björn Rosendahl =

Swedish orienteering competitor

Medal record

Men's orienteering

Representing Sweden

World Championships
Gold medal – first place	1979 Tampere	Relay

Björn Rosendahl (born 16 November 1956) is a Swedish orienteering competitor. He is Relay World Champion from 1979, as a member of the Swedish winning team. He won the Swedish championships in relay with his club OK Ravinen in 1978, 1979 and 1980. He won the Jukola relay with Ravinen in 1982.
