= OK Pan Århus =

Danish orienteering club

OK Pan Aarhus is an orienteering club based in Aarhus, Denmark. The club was founded on 23 October 1946.

To date, it is the only club to win the Jukola or Tiomila relays that has not been based in Norway, Sweden or Finland. The club won the Venla relay in 2013 and 2014. It won also the women's relay in Tiomila in 2014 with Miri Thrane Ødum, Ita Klingenberg, Ida Bobach, Maja Alm and Signe Søes. Other prominent club members are the world champions Emma Klingenberg, Tue Lassen and Søren Bobach.

== Tiomila results ==
TioMila results of best completed team
Year	Place	Ref.
2019	90	
2018	37	
2017	48	
2016	27	
2015	15	
2014	36	
