= Gleb Tikhonov =

Russian male orienteering competitor (born 1992)

Personal information
- Born: 17 December 1992 (age 33)

Sport
- Sport: Orienteering
- Club: Turun Metsänkävijät
Medal record
Representing Russia
Men's orienteering
World Championships
Bronze medal – third place	2014 Asiago-Lavarone	Mixed sprint relay
Bronze medal – third place	2015 Inverness	Mixed sprint relay
Junior World Championships
Gold medal – first place	2012 Košice	Sprint
Gold medal – first place	2012 Košice	Relay
Bronze medal – third place	2012 Košice	Long
Men's ski-orienteering
Junior World Ski Orienteering Championships
Gold medal – first place	2011 Lillehammer	Sprint
Bronze medal – third place	2011 Lillehammer	Long

Gleb Tikhonov (born 1992) is a Russian-Finnish male orienteering competitor.

He is a two-time World Orienteering Championships bronze medalist in the mixed relay — in 2014 in Asiago-Lavarone and in 2015 in Inverness — with the Russian team. As a junior, he won a gold medal in the sprint and a bronze medal in the long distance at the 2011 Junior World Ski Orienteering Championships in Lillehammer, and a gold medal in the sprint and in the relay at the 2012 Junior World Championships in Košice. He is the only Russian male to have won individual gold medals at both SkiO And FootO Junior World Orienteering Championships.
