= Rahel Friederich =

Swiss orienteering competitor

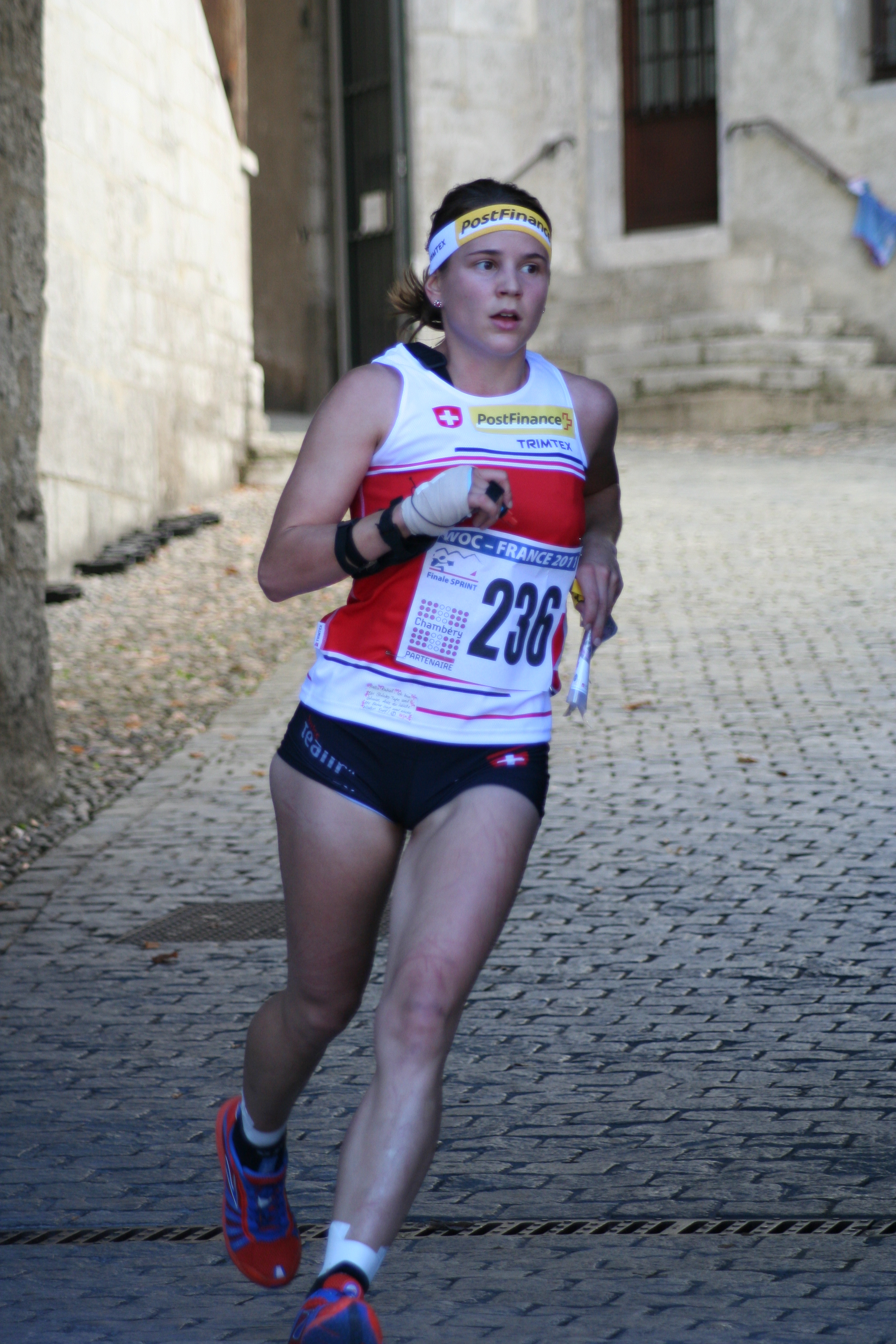

Medal record

Women's orienteering

Representing Switzerland

World Championships
Gold medal – first place	2014 Asiago-Lavarone	Mixed sprint relay
Silver medal – second place	2016 Strömstad	Mixed sprint relay

Rahel Friederich (born 22 January 1986) is a Swiss orienteering competitor. She was born in Zürich. She competed at the World Orienteering Championships in 2011 and 2012; in 2012 she placed fifth in the individual sprint competition. She won a gold medal in the mixed sprint relay with the Swiss team at the 2014 World Orienteering Championships.
