= 2015 World Orienteering Championships =

2015 edition of the World Orienteering Championships

- Host city: Inverness
- Country: Scotland
- Opening: 1 August 2015
- Closing: 7 August 2015
- Website: woc2015.scottish6days.com

The 32nd World Orienteering Championships were held in Inverness, Scotland, United Kingdom.

== Results ==
=== Men ===
==== Sprint ====
4.1 km, 23 controls

Medal	Athlete	Time
Gold	Jonas Leandersson (SWE)	13:12.1
Silver	Martin Hubmann (SUI)	13:14.0
Bronze	Jerker Lysell (SWE)	13:16.6

==== Middle ====
6.2 km, 25 controls

Medal	Athlete	Time
Gold	Daniel Hubmann (SUI)	34:23
Silver	Lucas Basset (FRA)	34:26
Bronze	Olle Boström (SWE)	34:36

==== Long ====
15.4 km, 32 controls

Medal	Athlete	Time
Gold	Thierry Gueorgiou (FRA)	1:39:46
Silver	Daniel Hubmann (SUI)	1:40:11
Bronze	Olav Lundanes (NOR)	1:40:43

==== Relay ====
Medal	Athlete	Time
Gold	Switzerland (Fabian Hertner, Daniel Hubmann, Matthias Kyburz)	1:41:40
Silver	Norway (Øystein Kvaal Østerbø, Carl Godager Kaas, Magne Dæhli)	1:43:30
Bronze	France (Vincent Coupat, Lucas Basset, Frédéric Tranchand)	1:43:52

=== Women ===
==== Sprint ====
3.8 km, 21 controls

Medal	Athlete	Time
Gold	Maja Alm (DEN)	13:32.5
Silver	Nadiya Volynska (UKR)	14:12.3
Bronze	Galina Vinogradova (RUS)	14:24.5

==== Middle ====
5.3 km, 21 controls

Medal	Athlete	Time
Gold	Annika Billstam (SWE)	35:46
Silver	Merja Rantanen (FIN)	36:36
Bronze	Emma Johansson (SWE)	37:04

==== Long ====
9.7 km, 19 controls

Medal	Athlete	Time
Gold	Ida Bobach (DEN)	1:15:35
Silver	Mari Fasting (NOR)	1:18:19
Bronze	Svetlana Mironova (RUS)	1:18:39

==== Relay ====
Medal	Athlete	Time
Gold	Denmark (Maja Alm, Ida Bobach, Emma Klingenberg)	1:49:06
Silver	Norway (Heidi Bagstevold, Mari Fasting, Anne Margrethe Hausken Nordberg)	1:52:08
Bronze	Sweden (Helena Jansson, Annika Billstam, Emma Johansson)	1:52:17

=== Mixed ===
==== Sprint relay ====
Medal	Athlete	Time
Gold	Denmark (Emma Klingenberg, Tue Lassen, Søren Bobach, Maja Alm)	1:00:54
Silver	Norway (Elise Egseth, Håkon Jarvis Westergård, Øystein Kvaal Østerbø, Anne Margrethe Hausken Nordberg)	1:02:15
Bronze	Russia (Tatyana Riabkina, Gleb Tikhonov, Andrey Khramov, Galina Vinogradova)	1:02:20
