= Maja Alm =

Danish orienteer (born 1988)

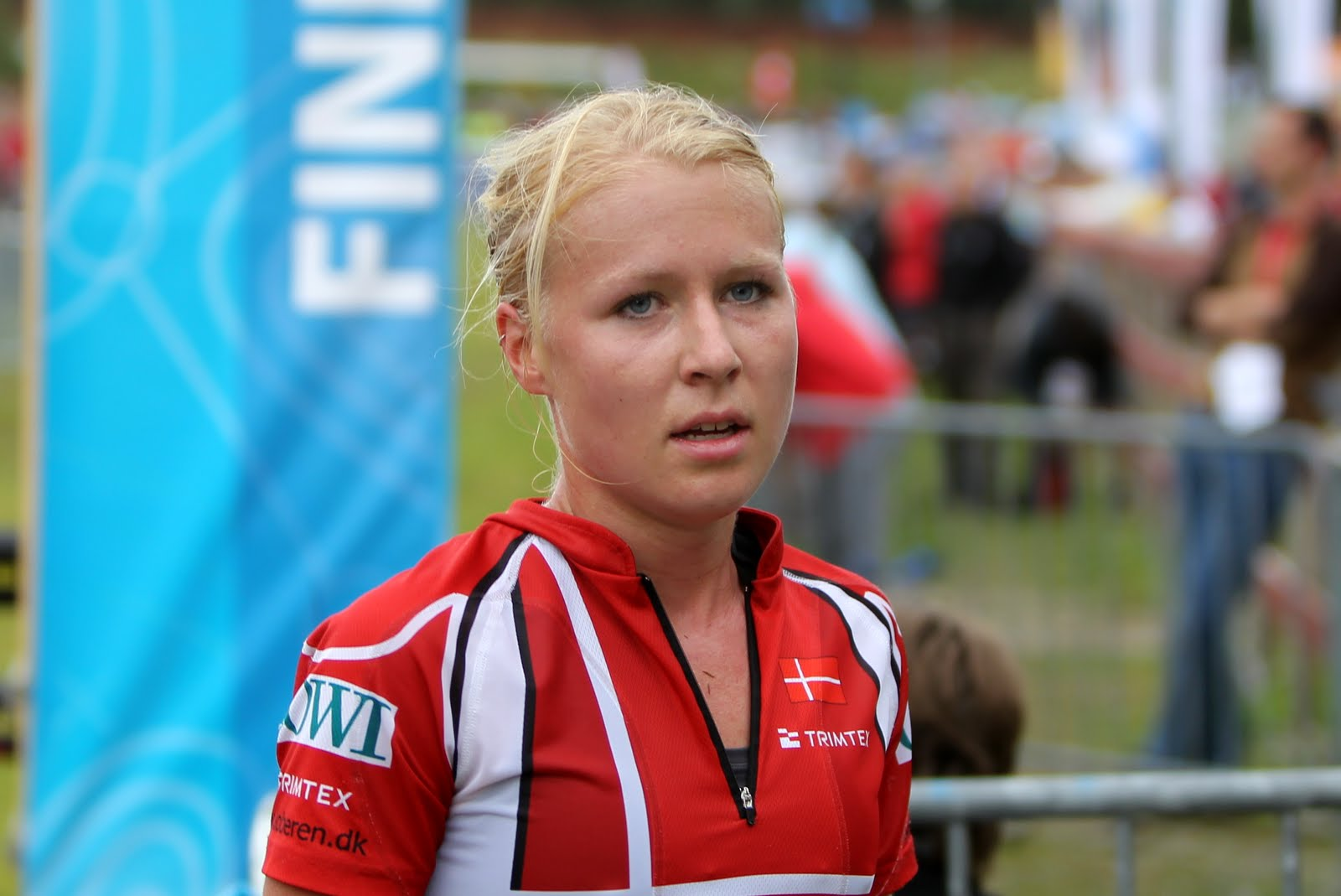
- Alm at WOC 2010

Personal information
- Full name: Maja Møller Alm
- Born: 10 July 1988 (age 37)
Medal record
Women's orienteering
Representing Denmark
World Championships
| Gold medal – first place | 2015 Inverness | Sprint |
| Gold medal – first place | 2015 Inverness | Relay |
| Gold medal – first place | 2015 Inverness | Mixed sprint relay |
| Gold medal – first place | 2016 Strömstad-Tanum | Sprint |
| Gold medal – first place | 2016 Strömstad-Tanum | Mixed sprint relay |
| Gold medal – first place | 2017 Tartu | Sprint |
| Gold medal – first place | 2018 Riga | Sprint |
| Silver medal – second place | 2012 Lausanne | Sprint |
| Silver medal – second place | 2014 Trentino-Veneto | Relay |
| Silver medal – second place | 2014 Trentino-Veneto | Mixed sprint relay |
| Silver medal – second place | 2016 Strömstad-Tanum | Relay |
| Silver medal – second place | 2017 Tartu | Long |
| Silver medal – second place | 2017 Tartu | Mixed sprint relay |
| Silver medal – second place | 2018 Riga | Long |
| Bronze medal – third place | 2014 Trentino-Veneto | Sprint |
| Bronze medal – third place | 2018 Riga | Mixed sprint relay |
| Bronze medal – third place | 2021 Doksy | Sprint |
World Games
| Gold medal – first place | 2017 Wroclaw | Sprint |
| Gold medal – first place | 2017 Wroclaw | Relay |
| Silver medal – second place | 2013 Cali | Relay |
| Bronze medal – third place | 2013 Cali | Sprint |
World Cup
| Bronze medal – third place | 2010 | WC Overall |
European Championships
| Bronze medal – third place | 2012 Falun | Sprint |
| Bronze medal – third place | 2010 Primorsko | Sprint |
Junior World Championships
| Silver medal – second place | 2008 Göteborg | Relay |
| Bronze medal – third place | 2007 Dubbo | Sprint |

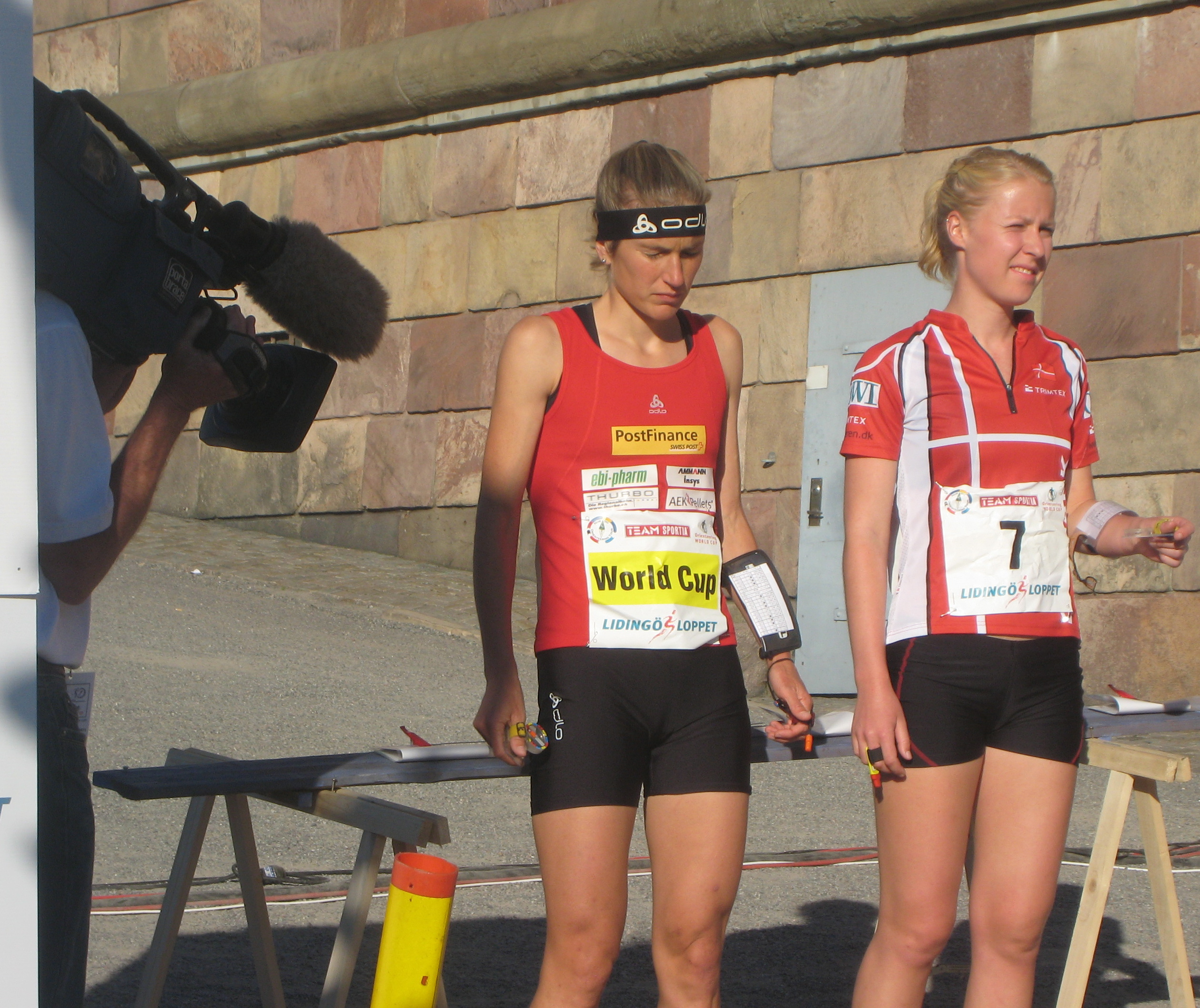
Simone Niggli and Maja Alm in Stockholm 2010.

Maja Møller Alm (born 10 July 1988) is a Danish orienteering and Athletics competitor who has won seven World Championships and two World Games titles. She is especially known for her four gold medals on the sprint distance, where she has won the title four years in a row: 2015, 2016, 2017 and 2018. She is also a medalist from the Junior World Championships. Since 2006 she has been coached by Danish national coach Lars Lindstrøm. Alm is remarkable for her dominant running speed, which gives her a great advantage over other competitors at the sprint distance.

== Junior career ==
Alm won a silver medal in relay at the Junior World Orienteering Championships in Gothenburg in 2008, together with Ida Bobach and Signe Klinting, and received an individual bronze medal in sprint at the 2007 championships in Dubbo.

== Senior career ==
In her early career, she competed for the Danish relay team at the 2007 World Orienteering Championships in Kyiv, where the team finished 8th. At the 2008 European Orienteering Championships in Ventspils, the Danish relay team finished 10th. She won a bronze medal at the European Orienteering Championships in Bulgaria in 2010.

In 2015, she won the first of four sprint gold medals in a row at the World Championships. Alm also won the Relay and Mixed Sprint Relay in the same year.

In 2017, Alm took her first individual forest medal at the World Championships – a silver in the Classic – behind Swedish runner Tove Alexandersson.

In 2018, Alm won her fourth sprint gold medal at the World Orienteering Championship in Riga, and in addition she brought the Danish mixed sprint relay team at the last leg from the seventh position to a bronze medal. She also won a silver medal in the long distance.

Alm runs for OK Pan Århus, and won the Jukola relay for the club in 2013 and 2014.

== World Championship results ==
Year
| Year | Age | Long | Middle | Sprint | Relay | Sprint; Relay |
| 2007 | 19 | — | — | — | 8 | —N/a |
| 2008 | 20 | — | — | — | — | —N/a |
| 2009 | 21 | 39 | 35 | 28 | — | —N/a |
| 2010 | 22 | 17 | 11 | 9 | 5 | —N/a |
| 2011 | 23 | — | 6 | 4 | 5 | —N/a |
| 2012 | 24 | — | 28 | 2 | 6 | —N/a |
| 2013 | 25 | — | 10 | 4 | 7 | —N/a |
| 2014 | 26 | — | 6 | 3 | 2 | 2 |
| 2015 | 27 | — | 11 | 1 | 1 | 1 |
| 2016 | 28 | — | 5 | 1 | 2 | 1 |
| 2017 | 29 | 2 | — | 1 | 10 | 2 |
| 2018 | 30 | 2 | — | 1 | 6 | 3 |
| 2019 | 31 | — | — | — | — | — |
| 2021 | 33 | — | — | 3 | — | 4 |

== Athletics ==
Alm competed in the 2018 European Cross Country Championships in Tilburg, where she finished 18th.

In 2019, she competed in the senior women's race at the 2019 IAAF World Cross Country Championships held in Aarhus, Denmark. She finished in 53rd place.

== See also ==
- Danish orienteers
- List of orienteers
- List of orienteering events
