= Turun Suunnistajat =

Orienteering club

Turun Suunnistajat is a Finnish orienteering club, located in Turku. The club was established in 1954.

Turun Suunnistajat won the men's Jukola relay in 1994, 1996, and 2001, and the women's Jukola (the Venla relay) in 2002. The club won Tiomila in 1994 (men's relay) and in 2003 (women's relay). Notable orienteers who have competed for the club include Petri Forsman, Janne Salmi, Troy de Haas, Jørgen Rostrup, Vroni König-Salmi, Terhi Holster, and Simone Niggli-Luder.
