= Fabian Hertner =

Swiss orienteering competitor

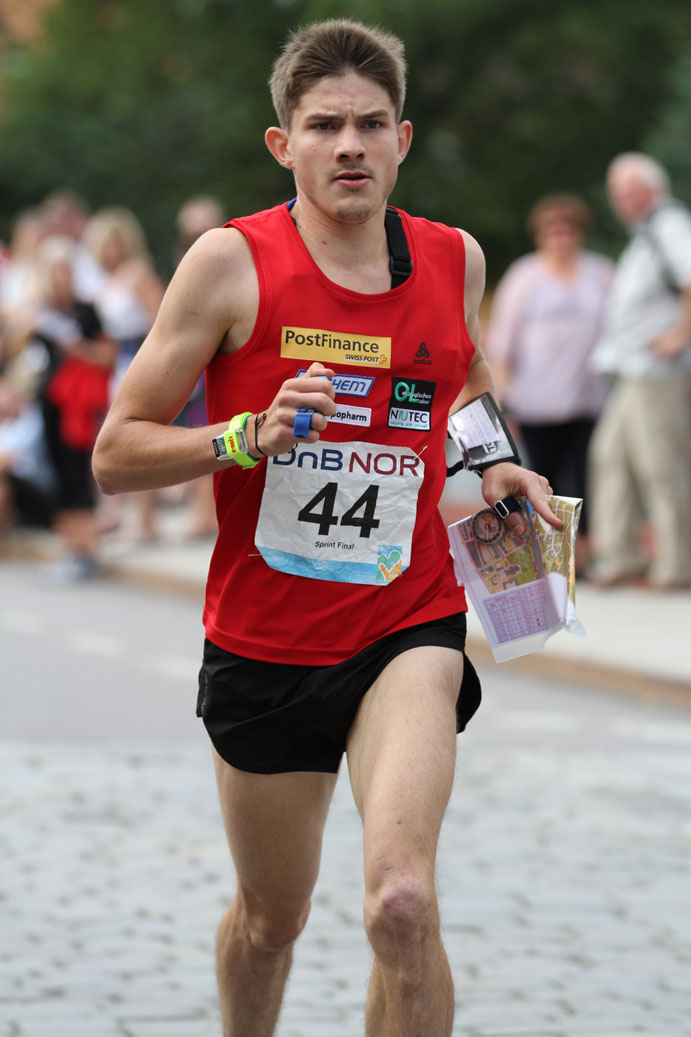
- Hertner in 2010

Medal record

Men's Orienteering

Representing Switzerland

World Championships
Gold medal – first place	2015 Inverness	Relay
Silver medal – second place	2009 Miskolc	Sprint
Silver medal – second place	2010 Trondheim	Sprint
Silver medal – second place	2014 Trentino	Middle
Silver medal – second place	2014 Trentino	Relay
Silver medal – second place	2016 Strömstad	Relay
Silver medal – second place	2017 Tartu	Middle
Bronze medal – third place	2012 Lausanne	Middle

World Cup
Silver medal – second place	2014	WC Overall
Bronze medal – third place	2013	WC Overall

European Championships
Gold medal – first place	2010 Primorsko	Sprint
Gold medal – first place	2010 Primorsko	Relay
Silver medal – second place	2014 Palmela	Middle
Bronze medal – third place	2010 Primorsko	Long

Junior World Championships
Gold medal – first place	2005 Tenero	Middle
Bronze medal – third place	2004 Gdańsk	Relay

Fabian Hertner (born 24 February 1985) is a Swiss orienteering competitor. He became Junior World Champion in the middle distance in 2005. Hertner runs for Kalevan Rasti in club competitions.

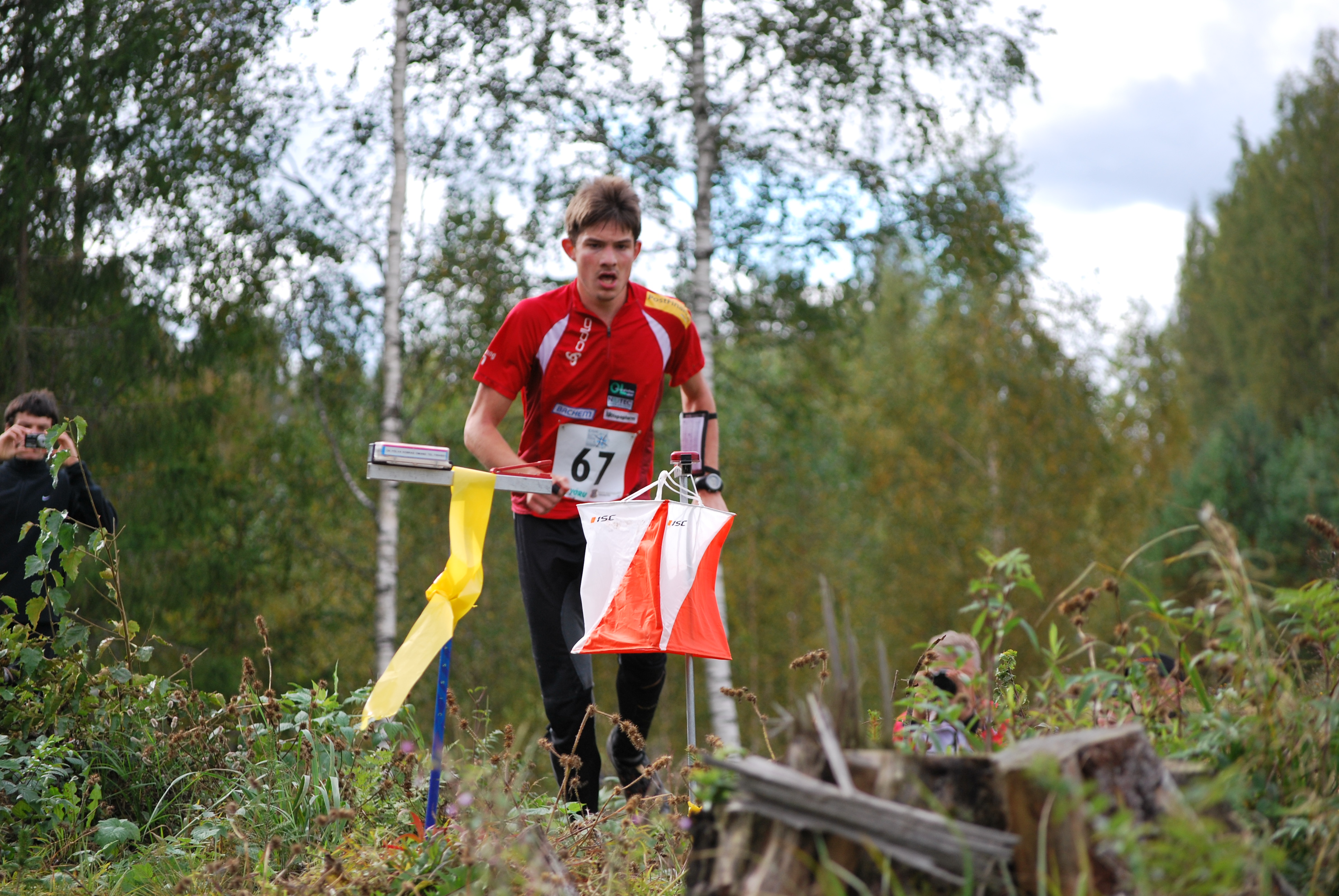
Fabian Hertner in 2009.

He won a silver medal in sprint at the 2009 World Orienteering Championships in Miskolc, Hungary and a bronze in middle at the 2012 in Col de la Givrine.
