= Håkon Jarvis Westergård =

Norwegian orienteer (born 1992)

Personal information
- Born: 24 September 1992 (age 33)

Sport
- Sport: Orienteering
- Club: Järla IF Orientering; Varegg
Medal record
Men's orienteering
Representing Norway
World Championships
Silver medal – second place	2015 Inverness	Mixed sprint relay

Håkon Jarvis Westergård (born 24 September 1992) is a Norwegian orienteering competitor.

He won a silver medal in the mixed sprint relay with the Norwegian team at the 2015 World Orienteering Championships in Inverness, with teammates Elise Egseth, Øystein Kvaal Østerbø and Anne Margrethe Hausken.

He competed at the 2016 World Orienteering Championships in Strömstad, where he placed 20th in the sprint final.
