= Galina Vinogradova =

Russian orienteering competitor

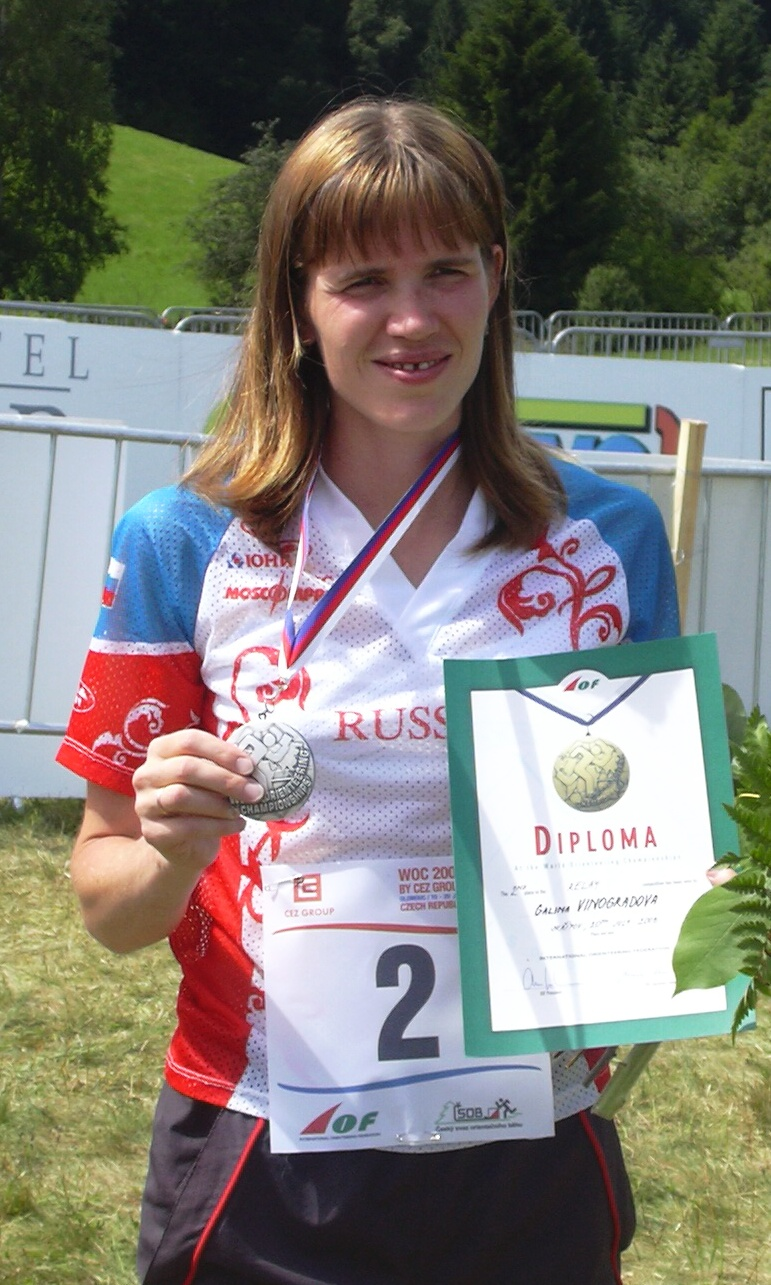
- Vinogradova at WOC 2008

Medal record

Women's orienteering

Representing Russia

World Championships
Silver medal – second place	2008 Olomouc	Relay
Bronze medal – third place	2014 Asiago-Lavarone	Mixed sprint relay
Bronze medal – third place	2015 Inverness	Sprint
Bronze medal – third place	2015 Inverness	Mixed sprint relay
Bronze medal – third place	2017 Tartu	Sprint

World Games
Gold medal – first place	2009 Kaohsiung	Mixed relay
Bronze medal – third place	2017 Wroclaw	Mixed relay

Junior World Championships
Silver medal – second place	1998 Reims	Relay

Galina Vladimirovna Vinogradova (Russian: Галина Владимировна Виноградова; née Galkina) (born 10 February 1979) is a Russian orienteering competitor. She received her first medal in the relay event at the 2008 World Orienteering Championships in Olomouc, coming second together with Yulia Novikova and Tatiana Ryabkina., and also finished 4th in the Sprint Discipline.

She received a Bronze medal in Sprint at both the 2015 World Orienteering Championships and the 2017 World Orienteering Championships.
