= 2014 World Orienteering Championships =

2014 edition of the World Orienteering Championships

- Host city: Venice
- Country: Italy
- Nations: 54
- Opening: 5 July 2014
- Closing: 12 July 2014
- Website: woc2014.fisoveneto.it

The 31st World Orienteering Championships was held in the Trentino and Veneto regions of Italy, from 5 to 12 July 2014. It was the first time that Mixed Sprint Relay was a part of the program at a World Championships.

== Results ==
=== Individual sprint final ===
5 July 2014

==== Men ====
1. Søren Bobach (Denmark), 15:37.2
2. Daniel Hubmann (Switzerland), 15:39.3
3. Tue Lassen (Denmark) 15:41.4

==== Women ====
1. Judith Wyder (Switzerland), 15:32.0
2. Tove Alexanderson (Sweden), 15:43.9
3. Maja Alm (Denmark), 15:45.7

=== Mixed sprint relay ===
7 July 2014

1. Switzerland (Rahel Friederich, Martin Hubmann, Matthias Kyburz, Judith Wyder), 59:04
2. Denmark (Emma Klingenberg, Tue Lassen, Søren Bobach, Maja Alm), 59:07
3. Russia (Anastasiya Tikhonova, Gleb Tikhonov, Andrey Khramov, Galina Vinogradova), 59:15

=== Long distance ===
9 July 2014

==== Men ====
1. Thierry Gueorgiou (France), 1:34:45
2. Daniel Hubmann (Switzerland), 1:36:12
3. Olav Lundanes (Norway), 1:37:09

==== Women ====
1. Svetlana Mironova (Russia), 1:19:44
2. Tove Alexandersson (Sweden), 1:20:15
3. Judith Wyder (Switzerland), 1:20:34

=== Middle distance ===
11 July 2014

==== Men ====
1. Olav Lundanes (Norway), 38:12
2. Fabian Hertner (Switzerland), 38:30
3. Oleksandr Kratov (Ukraine), 38:46

==== Women ====
1. Annika Billstam (Sweden), 37:03
2. Ida Bobach (Denmark), 37:25
3. Tove Alexandersson (Sweden), 37:27

=== Relay ===
12 July 2014

==== Men ====
1. Sweden (Jonas Leandersson, Fredrik Johansson, Gustav Bergman), 1:56:49
2. Switzerland (Fabian Hertner, Daniel Hubmann, Matthias Kyburz), 1:57:58
3. France (Frederic Tranchand, Francois Gonon, Thierry Gueorgiou ), 1:58:03

==== Women ====
1. Switzerland (Sara Luescher, Sabine Hauswirth, Judith Wyder), 1:51:11
2. Denmark (Emma Klingenberg, Ida Bobach, Maja Alm), 1:51:32
3. Sweden (Helena Jansson, Annika Billstam, Tove Alexandersson), 1:53:56

== Participating countries ==
A total of 54 countries participated at this World Championships.

- Argentina
- Australia
- Austria
- Azerbaijan
- Belgium
- Belarus
- Brazil
- Bulgaria
- Canada
- Chile
- China
- Colombia
- Croatia
- Cyprus
- Czech Republic
- Denmark
- Ecuador
- Spain
- Estonia
- Finland
- France
- Great Britain
- Germany
- Hong Kong
- Hungary
- Ireland
- Israel
- Italy
- Japan
- Korea
- Latvia
- Lithuania
- Moldova
- Macedonia
- Montenegro
- Netherlands
- North Korea
- Norway
- New Zealand
- Poland
- Portugal
- Romania
- South Africa
- Russia
- Slovenia
- Serbia
- Switzerland
- Slovakia
- Sweden
- Chinese Taipei
- Turkey
- Ukraine
- Uruguay
- USA
