= Tue Lassen =

Danish orienteering competitor

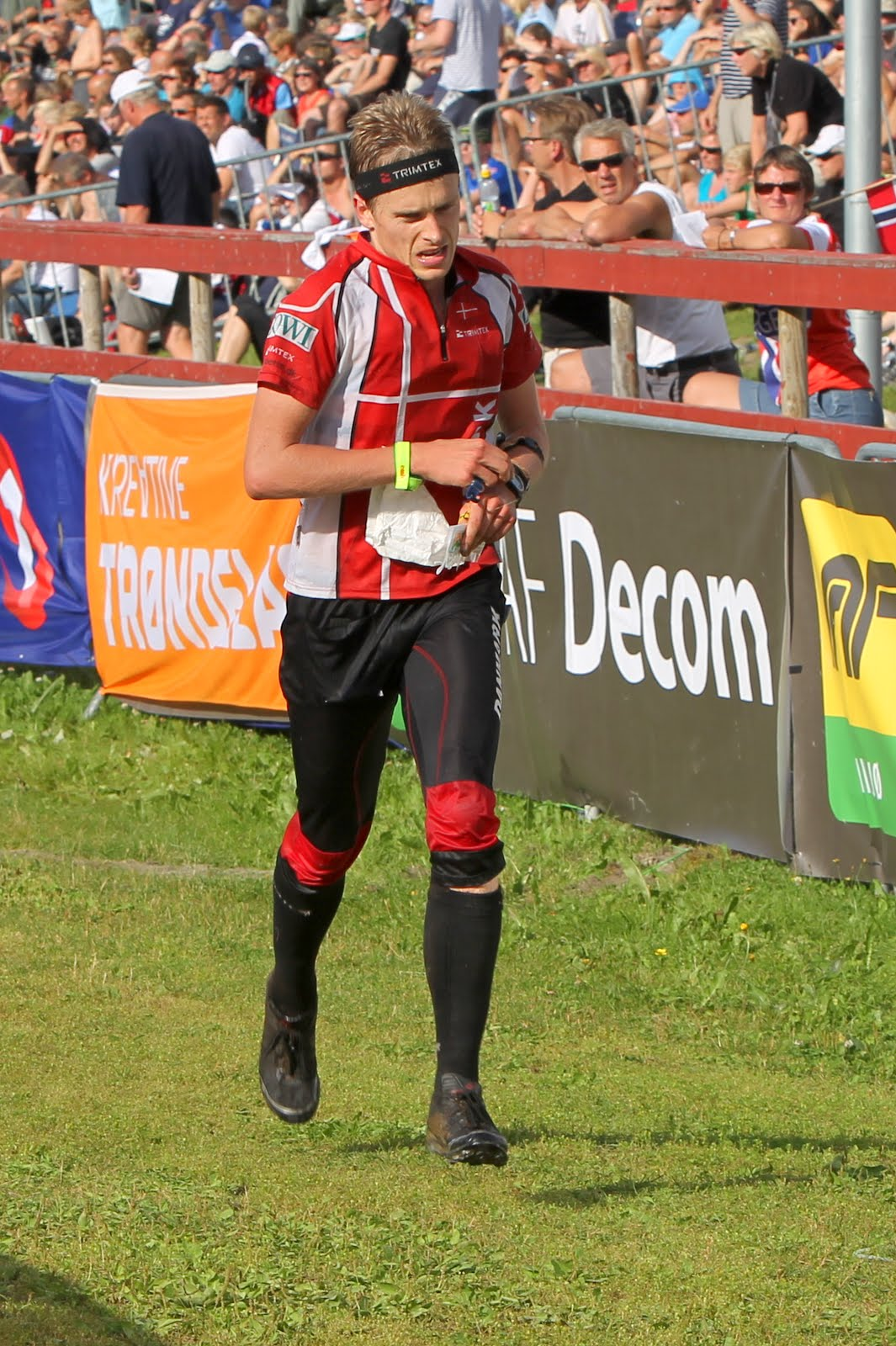

Medal record

Men's orienteering

Representing Denmark

World Championship
Silver medal – second place	2014 Asiago-Lavarone	Mixed sprint relay
Bronze medal – third place	2014 Asiago-Lavarone	Sprint
Gold medal – first place	2015 Inverness	Mixed sprint relay
Gold medal – first place	2016 Strömstad	Mixed sprint relay
Silver medal – second place	2017 Tartu	Mixed sprint relay

World Games
Silver medal – second place	2013 Cali	Relay

Tue Lassen is a Danish orienteering competitor. At the World Games in 2013 he won a silver medal in the mixed relay with the Danish team. Lassen won the Bronze medal in the sprint at the 2014 World Orienteering Championships. He runs for OK Pan Århus and Silkeborg OK.
