= Søren Bobach =

Danish orienteering competitor (born 1989)

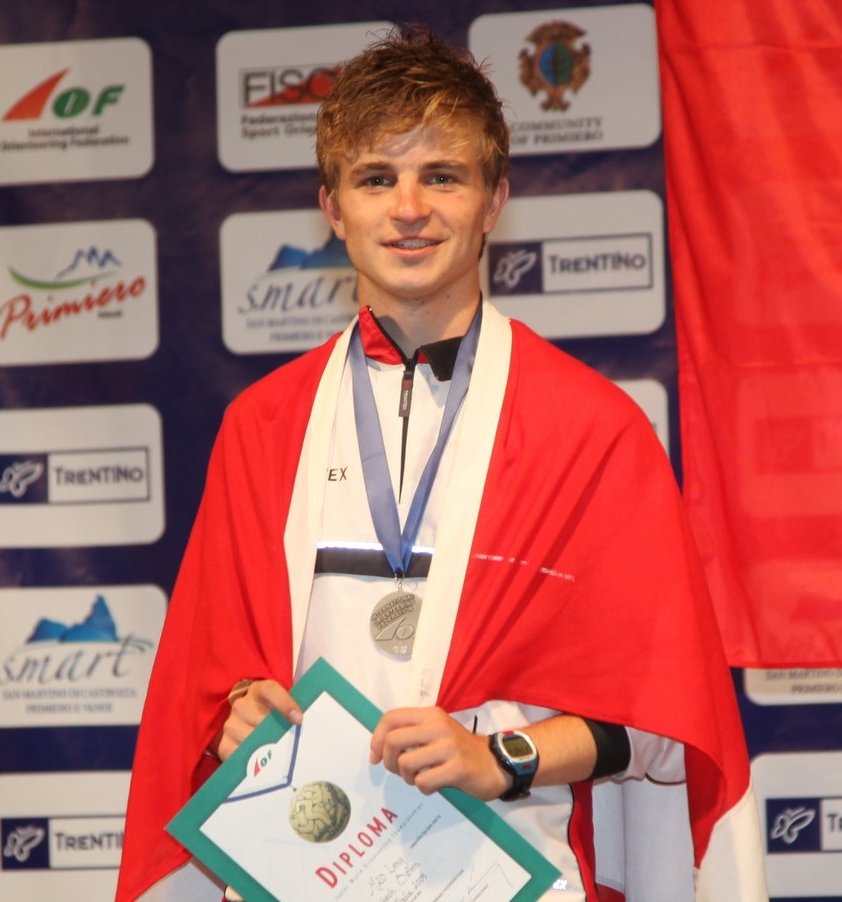
- Bobach with a silver medal of JWOC 2009 (Long)

Personal information
- Born: 25 April 1989 (age 37) Silkeborg, Denmark
Medal record
Men's orienteering
Representing Denmark
World Championships
Gold medal – first place	2014 Trentino-Veneto	Sprint
Gold medal – first place	2015 Inverness	Mixed sprint relay
Gold medal – first place	2016 Strömstad-Tanum	Mixed sprint relay
Silver medal – second place	2014 Trentino-Veneto	Mixed sprint relay
Junior World Championships
Gold medal – first place	2006 Druskininkai	Middle
Silver medal – second place	2009 Primiero	Long
Bronze medal – third place	2008 Göteborg	Middle
Bronze medal – third place	2008 Göteborg	Sprint
Bronze medal – third place	2009 Primiero	Relay

Søren Bobach (born 25 April 1989) is a Danish orienteering competitor, and world champion at both junior and senior level. He runs for OK Pan Århus.

He became Junior World Champion in the middle distance in Druskininkai in 2006, shared with Jan Beneš. He received a bronze medal in sprint in Gothenburg in 2008, behind Štěpán Kodeda and Johan Runesson, and a bronze medal in the middle distance.

He competed at the 2012 World Orienteering Championships. In the sprint competition, he qualified for the final, where he placed 9th.

Bobach won his first Men's World Championship medal at the 2014 World Orienteering Championships, winning the gold in the sprint. Bobach has since won two more gold medals in the Sprint Relay.

Bobach won the 2011 Jukola relay.

== See also ==
- Danish orienteers
- List of orienteers
- List of orienteering events
