= Nackareservatet =

Nature reserve in Sweden

Coordinates: 59°16′56″N 18°09′55″E

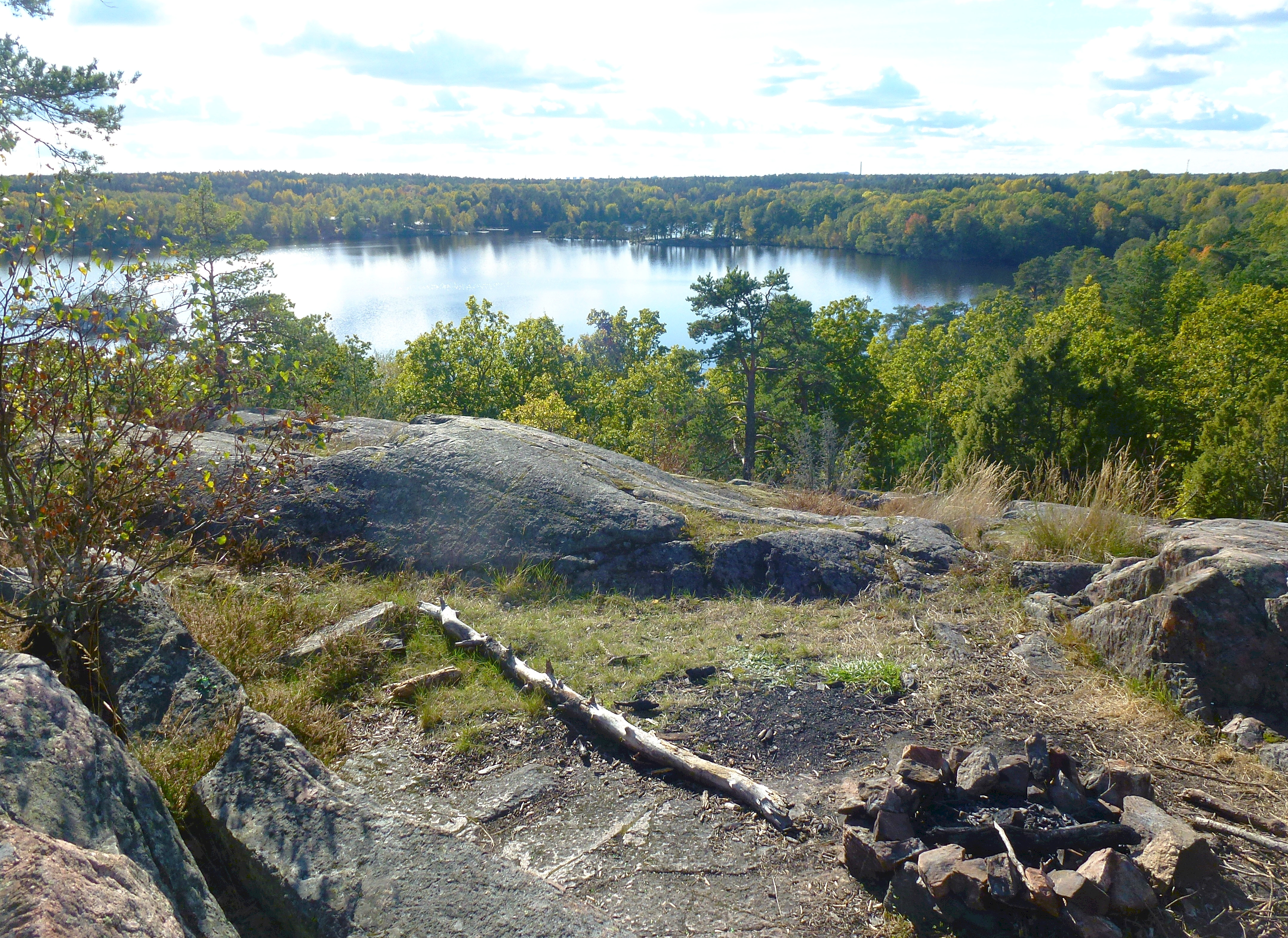
Nackareservat

Nackareservatet is a nature reserve along the border between Stockholm and Nacka Municipality in Sweden.

The area includes small lakes. with a natural setting typical of the southern Stockholm area. There are pine trees, rocky outcrops, and wetlands with small brooks. The area is used for several outdoor activities like walking and jogging, orienteering, skiing, ice skating, and summer and winter bathing. A golf course lies close to the district of Björkhagen.

== See also ==
- Tourism in Sweden
