= Hästhagen, Nacka Municipality =

Hästhagen
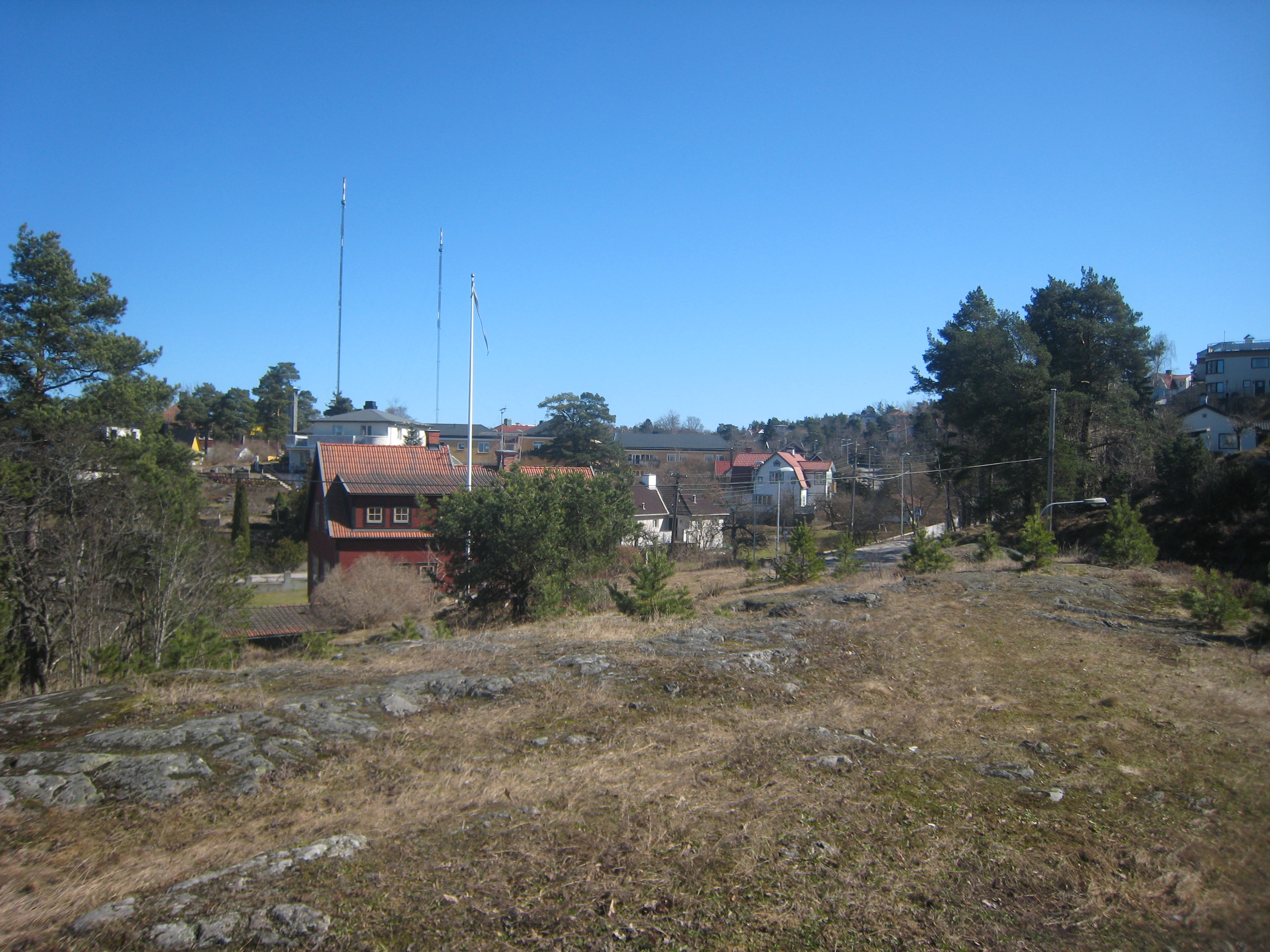
- Hästhagen

- Location within Stockholm Location within Sweden Location within European Union
- Coordinates: 59°18′N 18°09′E
- Country: Sweden
- Province: Södermanland
- County: Stockholm County
- Municipality: Nacka Municipality

Area
  - Total: 0.33 km^{2} (0.13 sq mi)

Population (31 December 2020)
  - Total: 496
  - Density: 1,500/km^{2} (3,900/sq mi)
- Time zone: UTC+1 (CET)
  - Summer (DST): UTC+2 (CEST)

Hästhagen is a locality situated in Nacka Municipality, Stockholm County, Sweden with 499 inhabitants in 2010.
