= Tiomila =

Swedish orienteering relay

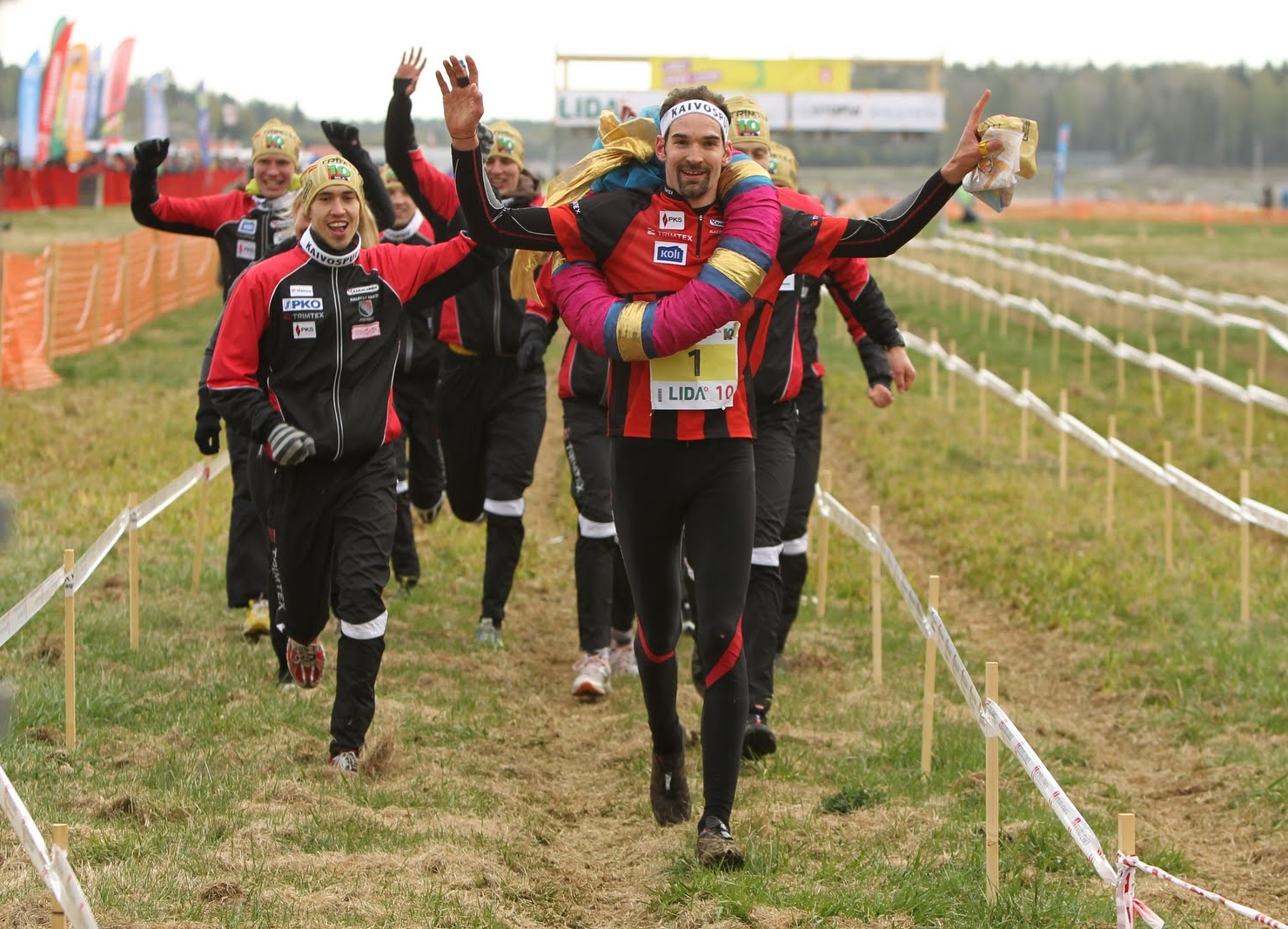
- Winner of Tiomila 2011 Kalevan Rasti
- Status: active
- Genre: sporting event
- Date: April–May
- Frequency: annual
- Country: Sweden
- Inaugurated: 1945 (men); 1977 (women); 1992 (youth)

Tiomila or 10-mila is an orienteering race held annually in Sweden since 1945, usually in late April or early May. It is a 10-man relay which includes both nighttime and daytime legs. The women's race consists of five daylight legs. Tiomila attracts club teams from all the major orienteering nations. In 2008, both the men's and the women's race consisted of about 350 teams. In 2019, there were 336 women's teams and 310 men's teams.

The name means "ten mil" (100 km) and refers to the total distance run by each team. The actual distance, however, varies from year to year. The 2015 edition was measured to 116 kilometres (72 mi) along the straight line between the controls.

== Upcoming events ==
Year	Dates	Location	Official Website
2025	3–4 May	Finspång	https://www.10mila.se/index.php/en/
2026	2–3 May	Tranås	https://www.10mila.se/index.php/en/

== Classes, rules and arrangement ==
The following classes are available within Tiomila:

- 10-milakavlen (open class but in practice with mostly male runners) is carried out with ten legs between Saturday evening and Sunday morning, the original race since 1945. At the longest stage of the roll – the fourth stage's "Long Night", during the darkest part of the night – a night light is necessary to orientate in the terrain. The stretch often covers around 100 minutes of the men's heat's ten hours and was decided during the 2017 Ten Mile from just before midnight to around 1.30am. This year, this equated to almost 17 kilometers (11 mi) of cross-country running in the dark.
- Damkavlen (only ladies) is carried out with five legs on Saturday afternoon and was added in 1977. Over the years it has grown to approximately 400 participating teams.
- Ungdomskavlen (for young people 12-16 years old) is carried out with four sections (two of which consist of girls only) at lunchtime on Saturday. The competition was introduced in 1992.

These rules apply to competitors in Tiomila (in addition to the usual rules in orienteering):

- It is permitted for girls and boys who have run the youth race to participate in the 10-mile race. The girls are also allowed to participate in the female breeding.
- It is not permitted to participate more than once in the same class.

== List of events and winners ==
Year	Location	Men	Women	Youth
1945	Uppsala–Enebyberg	(Sweden) SoIK Hellas	—	—
1946	Gripsholm–Älvsjöbadet	(Sweden) IF Goterna	—	—
1947	Uppsala–Helenelund	(Sweden) UoIF Matteuspojkarna	—	—
1948	Nynäs gård–Mälarhöjden	(Sweden) Skogsuvarnas IK	—	—
1949	Norrtälje–Hägernäs	(Sweden) Turebergs IF	—	—
1950	Sala–Läby Vad	(Sweden) OK Fyrismalm	—	—
1951	Trosa–Södertälje	(Sweden) IFK Lidingö	—	—
1952	Tyresö–Tullinge	(Sweden) SoIK Hellas	—	—
1953	Malmköping–Bränninge	(Sweden) Arboga OK	—	—
1954	Enebyberg–Gamla Uppsala	(Finland) Helsingin Suunnistajat	—	—
1955	Tveta–Saltskog	(Sweden) Arboga OK	—	—
1956	Barkarby–Knivsta	(Sweden) IF Thor	—	—
1957	Rådmansö–Åkersberga	(Sweden) IFK Hedemora	—	—
1958	Flen–Nyköping	(Sweden) Nyköpings OK	—	—
1959	Rimbo–Länna Bruk	(Sweden) Stockholms OK	—	—
1960	Eskilstuna–Mariefred	(Sweden) IFK Hedemora	—	—
1961	Edsviken–Norrtälje	(Sweden) Södertälje IF	—	—
1962	cancelled due to jaundice infection			
1963	Sjösa–Trosa	(Sweden) Rotebro IS	—	—
1964	Mölnbo–Malma Hed	(Sweden) Stora Tuna IK	—	—
1965	Hälleforsnäs–Strängnäs	(Sweden) OK Malmia	—	—
1966	Östra Kolmården	(Sweden) Tierps IF	—	—
1967	Riala	(Sweden) Kristinehamns OK	—	—
1968	Tullinge	(Sweden) Järfälla OK	—	—
1969	Åkers Styckebruk	(Sweden) IK Hakarpspojkarna	—	—
1970	Järna	(Sweden) IK Hakarpspojkarna	—	—
1971	Bogesund	(Sweden) IK Fyris	—	—
1972	Västerhaninge	(Sweden) Järfälla OK	—	—
1973	Skeppsta	(Sweden) Ludvika OK	—	—
1974	Sorunda	(Sweden) IK Hakarpspojkarna	—	—
1975	Kårsta	(Sweden) Hagaby GoIF	—	—
1976	Riala	(Sweden) Hagaby GoIF	—	—
1977	Tyresta By	(Sweden) OK Ravinen	(Sweden) Gävle OK	—
1978	Fiskeså	(Sweden) Gustavsbergs IF	(Sweden) IK Jarl	—
1979	Enhörna	(Sweden) OK Ravinen	(Sweden) OK Ravinen	—
1980	Ösmo	(Sweden) Gustavsbergs IF	(Sweden) OK Ravinen	—
1981	Kungsängen	(Sweden) OK Ravinen	(Sweden) OK Ravinen	—
1982	Eskilstuna	(Finland) Liedon Parma	(Sweden) Stora Tuna IK	—
1983	Skeppsta	(Finland) Kalevan Rasti	(Norway) Romerikslaget	—
1984	Uppsala	(Sweden) Tullinge SK	(Sweden) Stora Tuna IK	—
1985	Dunker	(Sweden) Almby IK	(Norway) NTHI	—
1986	Tullinge	(Sweden) IFK Södertälje	(Norway) NTHI	—
1987	Gimo	(Sweden) OK Pan-Önos	(Norway) NTHI	—
1988	Långdunker	(Sweden) Malmby IF	(Sweden) Tullinge SK	—
1989	Bogesund	(Sweden) OK Tyr	(Sweden) IFK Södertälje	—
1990	Norrtälje	(Sweden) OK Tyr	(Finland) Tampereen Pyrintö	—
1991	Ånhammar	(Finland) Angelniemen Ankkuri	(Finland) Tampereen Pyrintö	—
1992	Sorunda	(Sweden) IFK Södertälje	(Norway) NTHI	(Finland) Turun Suunnistajat
1993	Österbybruk	(Sweden) IFK Södertälje	(Sweden) Tullinge SK	(Finland) Turun Suunnistajat
1994	Hälleforsnäs	(Finland) Turun Suunnistajat	(Finland) Hämeenlinnan Suunnistajat	—
1995	Riala	(Sweden) IK Hakarpspojkarna	(Sweden) Sundsvalls OK	(Norway) Fredrikstad SK
1996	Salinge Gård	(Sweden) IFK Södertälje	(Sweden) Sundsvalls OK	(Finland) Tampereen Pyrintö
1997	Eskilstuna	(Norway) Bækkelagets SK	(Norway) Bækkelagets SK	(Sweden) Kristinehamns OK
1998	Rudan	(Norway) Halden SK	(Norway) Bækkelagets SK	(Sweden) Järfälla OK
1999	Enköping	(Norway) Halden SK	(Finland) Pargas IF	(Sweden) IK Hakarpspojkarna
2000	Solbacka	(Norway) Halden SK	(Sweden) Domnarvets GoIF	(Sweden) Gustavsberg/Järla
2001	Strängnäs	(Norway) Bækkelagets SK	(Finland) Kalevan Rasti	(Sweden) OK Denseln
2002	Surahammar	(Norway) Halden SK	(Norway) Halden SK	(Sweden) Alfta-Ösa OK
2003	Kungsör	(Norway) Halden SK	(Finland) Turun Suunnistajat	(Sweden) OK Tisaren
2004	Kolmården	(Norway) Halden SK	(Sweden) Ulricehamns OK	(Sweden) Järla IF
2005	Kungsängen	(Sweden) Södertälje-Nykvarn	(Sweden) Domnarvets GoIF	(Sweden) Halmstad/Löftan
2006	Hallsberg	(Norway) Halden SK	(Norway) Nydalens SK	(Sweden) Stora Tuna IK
2007	Eskilstuna	(Norway) Halden SK	(Sweden) SoIK Hellas	(Sweden) Stora Tuna IK
2008	Rosersberg	(Norway) Kristiansand OK	(Sweden) Stora Tuna OK	(Finland) Turun Suunnistajat
2009	Perstorp	(Norway) Kristiansand OK	(Norway) Halden SK	(Sweden) Södertälje-Nykvarn
2010	Finspång	(Finland) Kalevan Rasti	(Sweden) IFK Lidingö	(Norway) Raumar
2011	Tullinge	(Finland) Kalevan Rasti	(Finland) Tampereen Pyrintö	(Sweden) Södertälje-Nykvarn
2012	Kvarn	(Norway) Halden SK	(Norway) Halden SK	(Finland) Ounasvaaran Hiihtoseura
2013	Gällöfsta	(Finland) Kalevan Rasti	(Sweden) Domnarvets GoIF	(Finland) Helsingin Suunnistajat
2014	Eksjö	(Finland) Kalevan Rasti	(Denmark) OK Pan Århus	(Finland) MS Parma
2015	Skepptuna	(Sweden) IFK Göteborg	(Sweden) Domnarvets GoIF	(Norway) Nydalens SK
2016	Falun	(Sweden) Södertälje-Nykvarn	(Denmark) OK Pan Århus	(Sweden) Stora Tuna OK
2017	Partille	(Sweden) IFK Göteborg	(Sweden) Stora Tuna OK	(Sweden) IK Hakarpspojkarna
2018	Nynäshamn	(Sweden) IFK Göteborg	(Sweden) Järla Orientering	(Finland) Espoon Suunta
2019	Glimåkra	(Sweden) IFK Göteborg	(Finland) Tampereen Pyrintö	(Sweden) Karlskrona SOK
2020	cancelled due to the COVID-19 pandemic			
2021	cancelled due to the COVID-19 pandemic			
2022	Ånnaboda, Örebro	(Sweden) OK Linné	(Norway) Nydalens SK	(Sweden) Göteborg-Majorna OK
2023	Skellefteå	(Norway) NTNUI	(Sweden) IFK Göteborg	(Sweden) IFK Göteborg
2024	Nynäshamn	(Sweden) Stora Tuna OK	(Sweden) Stora Tuna OK	(Finland) Turun Suunnistajat
2025	Finspång	(Norway) NTNUI	(Sweden) IFK Göteborg	(Sweden) IFK Göteborg
2026	Tranås			

=== Record winners ===
==== 10-milakavlen ====
Wins	Club	Editions
9	(Norway) Halden SK	1998, 1999, 2000, 2002, 2003, 2004, 2006, 2007, 2012
5	(Finland) Kalevan Rasti	1983, 2010, 2011, 2013, 2014
4	(Sweden) IFK Göteborg	2015, 2017, 2018, 2019
4	(Sweden) IFK Södertälje	1986, 1992, 1993, 1996
4	(Sweden) IK Hakarpspojkarna	1969, 1970, 1974, 1995
3	(Sweden) OK Ravinen	1977, 1979, 1981
2	(Sweden) Stora Tuna IK/OK	1964, 2024
2	(Sweden) Södertälje-Nykvarn	2005, 2016
2	(Norway) Kristiansand OK	2008, 2009
2	(Norway) Bækkelagets SK	1999, 2001
2	(Sweden) OK Tyr	1989, 1990
2	(Sweden) Gustavsbergs IF	1978, 1980
2	(Sweden) Hagaby GoIF	1975, 1976
2	(Sweden) Järfälla OK	1968, 1973
2	(Sweden) IFK Hedemora	1957, 1960
2	(Sweden) Arboga OK	1953, 1955
2	(Sweden) SoIK Hellas	1945, 1952

==== Damkavlen ====
Wins	Club	Editions
5	(Sweden) Stora Tuna IK/OK	1982, 1984, 2008, 2017, 2024
4	(Finland) Tampereen Pyrintö	1990, 1991, 2011, 2019
4	(Sweden) Domnarvets GoIF	2000, 2005, 2013, 2015
4	(Norway) NTHI	1985, 1986, 1987, 1992
3	(Norway) Halden SK	2002, 2009, 2012
3	(Sweden) OK Ravinen	1979, 1980, 1981
2	(Denmark) OK Pan Århus	2014, 2016
2	(Sweden) Sundsvalls OK	1995, 1996
2	(Sweden) Tullinge SK	1988, 1993

==== Ungdomskavlen ====
Wins	Club	Editions
4	(Finland) Turun Suunnistajat	1992, 1993, 2008, 2024
3	(Sweden) Stora Tuna OK	2006, 2007, 2016
2	(Sweden) IK Hakarpspojkarna	1999, 2017
2	(Sweden) IFK Södertälje	2009, 2011

== Gallery ==
Start of Tiomila 2011
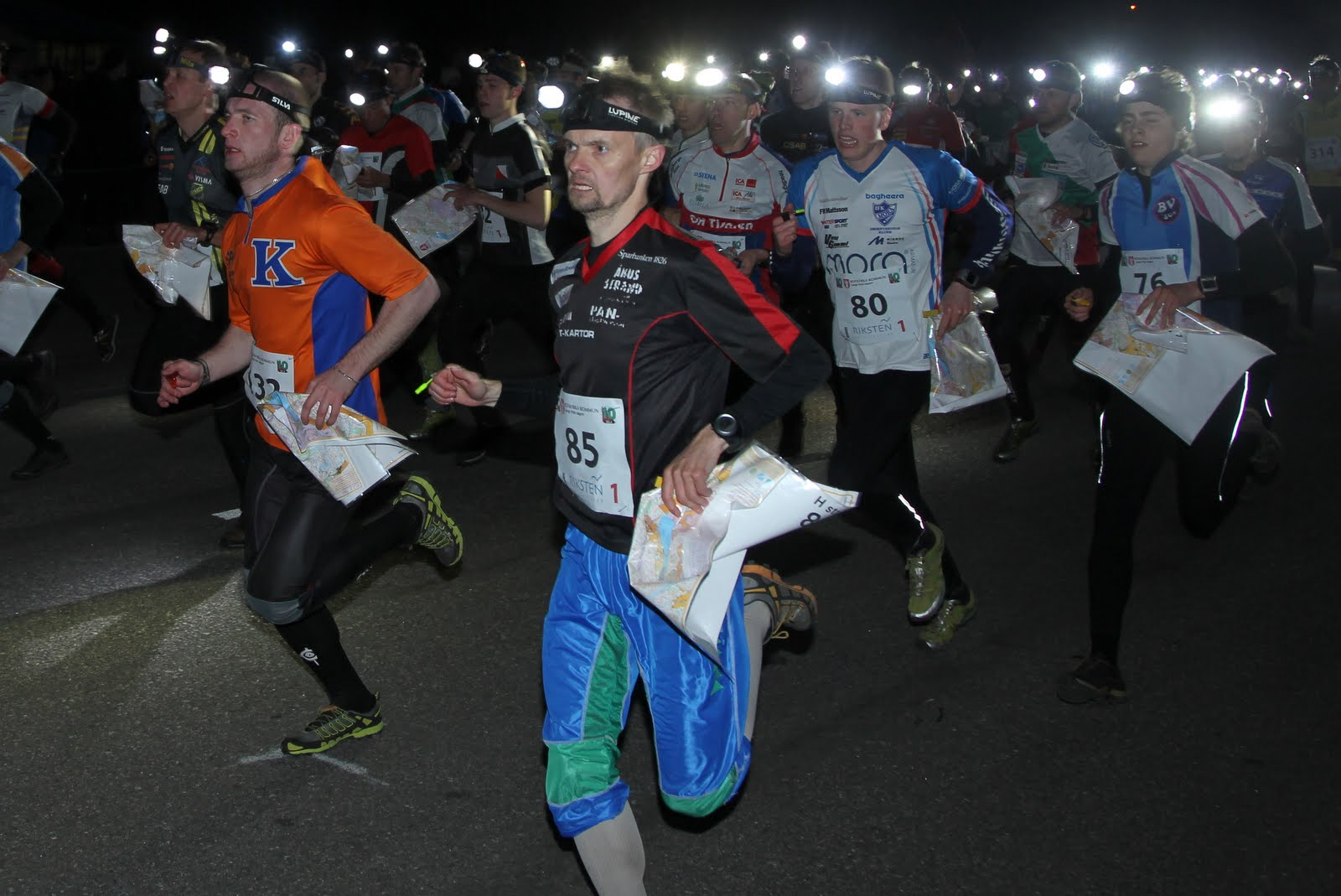
Men

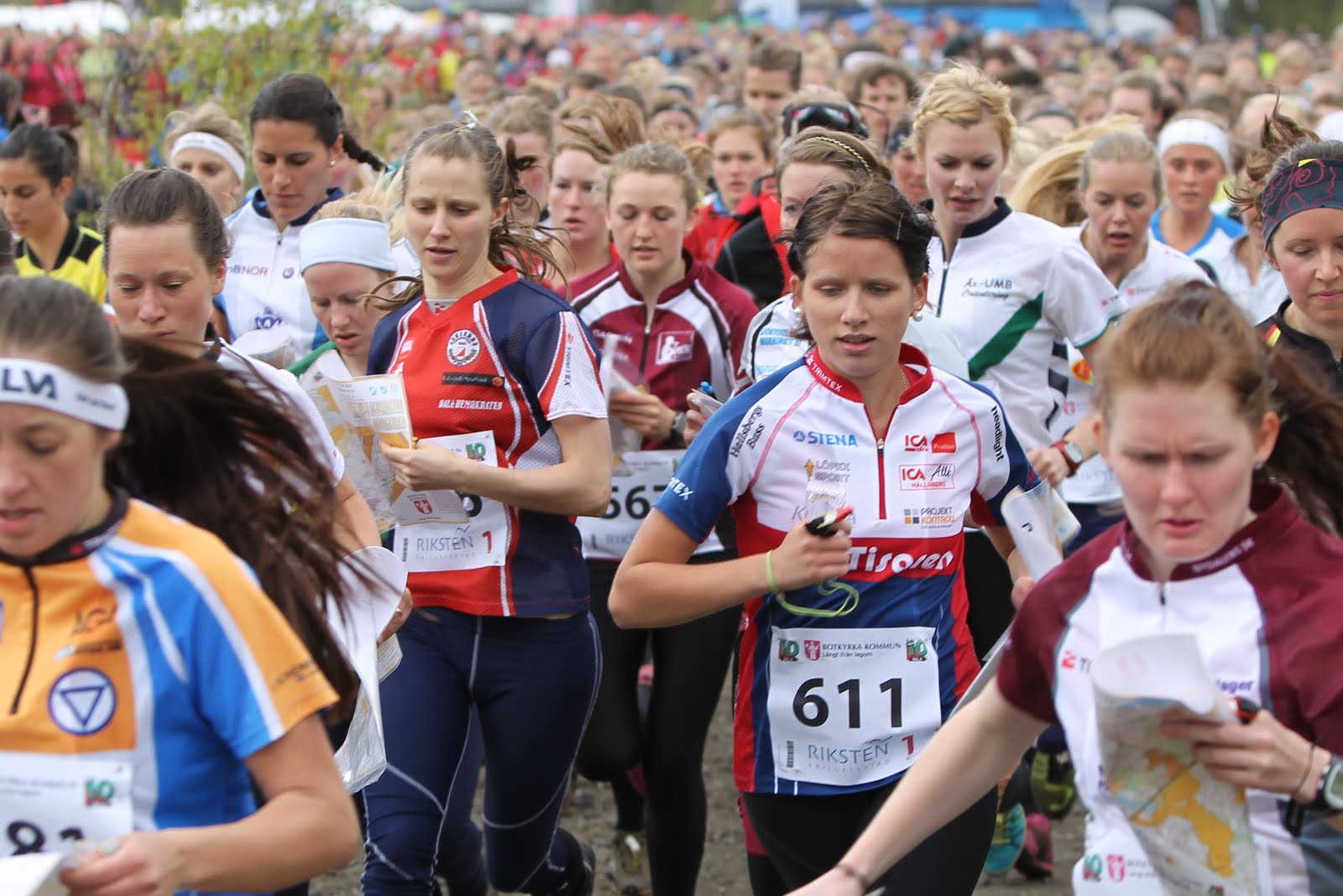
Women

== See also ==
- Jukola relay
- O-Ringen
- List of sporting events in Sweden
