= Emma Klingenberg =

Danish orienteering competitor

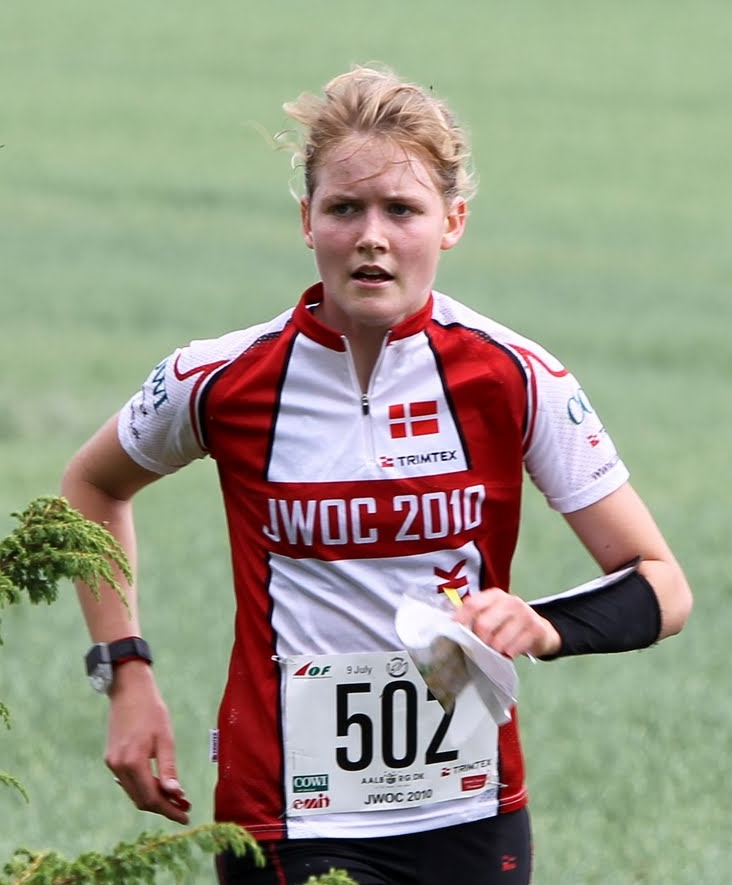

Medal record

Women's orienteering

Representing Denmark

World Championship
| Gold medal – first place | 2015 Inverness | Relay |
| Gold medal – first place | 2015 Inverness | Mixed sprint relay |
| Silver medal – second place | 2014 Trento | Relay |
| Silver medal – second place | 2014 Trento | Mixed sprint relay |

Junior World Championships
| Gold medal – first place | 2008 Göteborg | Sprint |
| Gold medal – first place | 2010 Aalborg | Relay |
| Gold medal – first place | 2012 Košice | Relay |
| Silver medal – second place | 2011 Lębork | Sprint |
| Silver medal – second place | 2011 Wejherowo | Long |
| Bronze medal – third place | 2009 Primiero | Relay |
| Bronze medal – third place | 2011 Wejherowo | Middle |
| Bronze medal – third place | 2011 Wejherowo | Relay |

Emma Klingenberg (born 18 May 1992) is a Danish orienteering competitor, and junior World champion.

== Early life ==
Klingenberg has done orienteering since she was seven years old. Before 2008 she participated in the European Youth Orienteering Championships. Her club is OK Pan Århus and she is from the southern part of Denmark.

== Junior career ==
Emma Klingenberg became Junior World Champion in sprint in Gothenburg in 2008, before Silje Ekroll Jahren and Jenny Lönnkvist, with less than three seconds between winner and third place. She was the youngest person to ever win a junior world orienteering championship, at the age of 16.

The junior world championship, and Klingenberg's victory in the sprint event, has been covered or referred to in news magazines and sports magazines worldwide. Danish newspapers had more in-depth presentations of the winner.

Klingenberg went on to win two more gold medals as a junior, both in the Relay. She became a senior after the 2012 Junior World Championships.

== Senior career ==
two years after becoming a senior, Klingenberg won her first medal in the 2014 World Orienteering Championships in Italy. In 2015, the Danish women's team won 4 of the 5 gold medals at the championships in Inverness. Emma was a member of both relay teams, bringing back two gold medals.

To date, Klingenberg has not won any individual gold medals at a senior championship.

== See also ==
- Danish orienteers
- List of orienteers
- List of orienteering events
