= List of Muaythai practitioners at the 2022 World Games =

This is a list of the Muay Thai practitioners (Note: Muaythai is the official name of Muay Thai, recognized by International World Games Association and International Olympic Committee.) who participated at the 2022 World Games in Birmingham, Alabama, United States from 15 to 17 July 2022. 89 Muay Thai practitioners competed in the Games across 12 events.

== Male Muay Thai practitioners ==
| NOC | Name | Age | Events |
|---|---|---|---|
| Brazil | Cristiano Zanchettin | 31 October 1987 (aged 34) | Men's 81 kg |
| Czech Republic | Jakub Klauda | 28 December 1992 (aged 29) | Men's 91 kg |
| France | Jimmy Vienot | 19 June 1995 (aged 27) | Men's 71 kg |
| Greece | Dimos Asimakopoulos | 22 December 1993 (aged 28) | Men's 67 kg |
| Hungary | Speth Norbert Attila | 30 April 1995 (aged 27) | Men's 67 kg |
| Iran | Hamidreza Kordabadi | 9 January 1995 (aged 27) | Men's 91 kg |
| Iraq | Mustafa Al Tekreeti | 14 January 1998 (aged 24) | Men's 81 kg |
| Iraq | Ali Kinanah | 1 February 1997 (aged 25) | Men's 57 kg |
| Israel | Itai Gershon | 27 May 1993 (aged 29) | Men's 71 kg |
| Italy | Cosimo Frantoni | | Men's 63.5 kg |
| Kazakhstan | Abil Galiyev | 12 May 1996 (aged 26) | Men's 63.5 kg |
| Kazakhstan | Almaz Sarsembekov | 20 February 1996 (aged 26) | Men's 57 kg |
| Malaysia | Ahmad Nor Iman Aliff Bin Rakib | 4 February 2004 (aged 18) | Men's 57 kg |
| Malaysia | Muhammad Syahidi Bin Ruslan | 17 December 1981 (aged 40) | Men's 67 kg |
| Mauritius | James Aghate | 15 May 1983 (aged 39) | Men's 91 kg |
| Mexico | Miguel Angel Padilla Robles | 6 May 1990 (aged 32) | Men's 81 kg |
| Morocco | Zahidi Abdelali | 8 July 1999 (aged 22) | Men's 71 kg |
| Morocco | Rachid Hamza | 1 September 1999 (aged 22) | Men's 67 kg |
| Peru | Matteo Celli | 22 April 1989 (aged 33) | Men's 81 kg |
| Philippines | Phillip Delarmino | 9 November 1990 (aged 31) | Men's 57 kg |
| Poland | Lukasz Radosz | 8 June 1993 (aged 29) | Men's 91 kg |
| Portugal | Rui Botelho | 25 November 1994 (aged 27) | Men's 57 kg |
| Portugal | Diogo Calado | 17 July 1990 (aged 31) | Men's 81 kg |
| Saudi Arabia | Wesam Alalawi | 16 September 1989 (aged 32) | Men's 91 kg |
| Saudi Arabia | Abdullah Alqahtani | 25 April 1986 (aged 36) | Men's 67 kg |
| Slovakia | Lukas Mandinec | 5 October 1989 (aged 32) | Men's 63.5 kg |
| South Korea | Young Cheol Kwon | | Men's 63.5 kg |
| Thailand | Anueng Khatthamarasri | 24 March 1993 (aged 29) | Men's 67 kg |
| Thailand | Thanet Nitutorn | 23 February 2001 (aged 21) | Men's 71 kg |
| Thailand | Weerasak Tharakhajad | 27 October 1996 (aged 25) | Men's 63.5 kg |
| Turkey | Enis Yunusoglu | 24 May 1999 (aged 23) | Men's 81 kg |
| Ukraine | Igor Liubchenko | 16 March 1996 (aged 26) | Men's 63.5 kg |
| Ukraine | Vladyslav Mykytas | 16 September 1995 (aged 26) | Men's 57 kg |
| Ukraine | Oleh Pryimachov | 11 November 1989 (aged 32) | Men's 91 kg |
| Ukraine | Oleksandr Yefimenko | 2 October 2001 (aged 20) | Men's 71 kg |
| United Arab Emirates | Amine El Moatassime | 8 September 1994 (aged 27) | Men's 71 kg |
| United Arab Emirates | Ilyass Hbibali | 26 August 1991 (aged 30) | Men's 81 kg |
| United Arab Emirates | Mohammed Mardi | 26 September 2001 (aged 20) | Men's 67 kg |
| United Arab Emirates | Noureddine Samir | 20 March 1990 (aged 32) | Men's 63.5 kg |
| United States | Austin Amell | 13 August 1996 (aged 25) | Men's 57 kg |
| United States | Matt Baker | 21 May 1991 (aged 31) | Men's 91 kg |
| United States | Luke Lessei | 30 April 1996 (aged 26) | Men's 71 kg |
| United States | Joseph Mueller | 30 November 1989 (aged 32) | Men's 63.5 kg |
| United States | Aaron Ortiz | 2 October 1998 (aged 23) | Men's 81 kg |
| United States | Travis Petralba | 23 June 1988 (aged 34) | Men's 67 kg |
| Uzbekistan | Fanat Kakhramonov | 23 December 1996 (aged 25) | Men's 91 kg |
| Uzbekistan | Bobirjon Tagiev | | Men's 71 kg |
| Vietnam | Nguyễn Trần Duy Nhất | 21 March 1989 (aged 33) | Men's 57 kg |

== Female Muay Thai practitioners ==
| NOC | Name | Age | Events |
|---|---|---|---|
| Afghanistan | Freshta Sherzad | 31 March 2000 (aged 22) | Women's 51 kg |
| Afghanistan | Kawsar Sherzad | 7 October 2003 (aged 18) | Women's 48 kg |
| Australia | Zoe Putorak | 3 August 1999 (aged 22) | Women's 63.5 kg |
| Australia | Yolanda Schmidt | | Women's 54 kg |
| Austria | Rebecca Hoedl | 6 January 1988 (aged 34) | Women's 51 kg |
| Austria | Nina Scheucher | 8 August 1986 (aged 35) | Women's 60 kg |
| Brazil | Graziela Gouveia da Silva | 27 February 1994 (aged 28) | Women's 57 kg |
| Canada | Savannah Foden | 19 April 2000 (aged 22) | Women's 63.5 kg |
| Canada | Yumiko Kawano | 7 January 1982 (aged 40) | Women's 54 kg |
| Czech Republic | Viktorie Bulnov | 21 April 1998 (aged 24) | Women's 54 kg |
| Finland | Tessa Kakkonen | 8 March 1993 (aged 29) | Women's 48 kg |
| France | Anaelle Angerville | 5 August 1989 (aged 32) | Women's 57 kg |
| France | Nora Cornolle | 6 December 1989 (aged 32) | Women's 63.5 kg |
| Germany | Atenea Flores | 13 December 1986 (aged 35) | Women's 54 kg |
| Great Britain | Iman Yasmin Barlow | 14 April 1993 (aged 29) | Women's 57 kg |
| Great Britain | Niamh Kinehan | | Women's 60 kg |
| Hong Kong | Alex Tsang | 11 February 1992 (aged 30) | Women's 57 kg |
| Hungary | Ajsa Adel Sandorfi | 28 March 2001 (aged 21) | Women's 60 kg |
| Iran | Nadiya Etemad Moghaddam | 21 August 1995 (aged 26) | Women's 63.5 kg |
| Iran | Zahra Nasiri Sooreh Bargh | 24 July 1998 (aged 23) | Women's 57 kg |
| Israel | Nili Block | 16 January 1995 (aged 27) | Women's 60 kg |
| Italy | Sveva Melillo | 20 July 1994 (aged 27) | Women's 54 kg |
| Poland | Dominika Filec | 12 April 1998 (aged 24) | Women's 60 kg |
| Poland | Gabriela Kuzawinska | 26 March 1993 (aged 29) | Women's 51 kg |
| Mauritius | Diksha Jeeloll | 7 May 1999 (aged 23) | Women's 51 kg |
| Morocco | Oumayma Belourat | 1 January 1999 (aged 23) | Women's 48 kg |
| Morocco | Meriem El Moubarik | 16 July 1991 (aged 30) | Women's 51 kg |
| Philippines | Leeana Bade | 18 November 1995 (aged 26) | Women's 63.5 kg |
| Singapore | Cheryl Gwa | 5 August 1990 (aged 31) | Women's 48 kg |
| Slovakia | Monika Chochlikova | 13 January 1996 (aged 26) | Women's 51 kg |
| Spain | Sarai Medina | 26 January 1989 (aged 33) | Women's 48 kg |
| Sweden | Ewin Ates | 24 January 1991 (aged 31) | Women's 60 kg |
| Sweden | Patricia Axling | 16 December 1987 (aged 34) | Women's 57 kg |
| Sweden | Erica Bjornestrand | 14 August 1986 (aged 35) | Women's 63.5 kg |
| Thailand | Janejira Wankrue | 28 October 1996 (aged 25) | Women's 63.5 kg |
| Thailand | Wansawang Srila Or | 21 January 1998 (aged 24) | Women's 51 kg |
| Turkey | Kbra Akta | 25 December 1997 (aged 24) | Women's 54 kg |
| Turkey | Erivan Barut | 26 June 2000 (aged 22) | Women's 48 kg |
| Turkey | Kubra Kocakus | 24 July 1996 (aged 25) | Women's 60 kg |
| Ukraine | Anastasiia Kulinich | 14 January 1996 (aged 26) | Women's 48 kg |
| United States | Angela Bahr | 1 August 1982 (aged 39) | Women's 51 kg |
| United States | Tierra Brand | 15 November 2001 (aged 20) | Women's 57 kg |
| United States | Erin Clayton | 1 November 1992 (aged 29) | Women's 63.5 kg |
| United States | Janet Garcia Borbon | 19 April 1991 (aged 31) | Women's 48 kg |
| United States | Charlsey Maner | 16 September 1997 (aged 24) | Women's 60 kg |
| United States | Ashley Thinner | 12 November 1993 (aged 28) | Women's 54 kg |
| Uzbekistan | Aziza Mamurova | | Women's 57 kg |
| Vietnam | Bùi Yến Ly | 26 February 1995 (aged 27) | Women's 54 kg |
