= Muaythai at the 2022 World Games =

- The pictogram of Muaythai.
- Venue: Boutwell Memorial Auditorium
- Dates: 15–17 July 2022
- No. of events: 12
- Competitors: 96 from 39 nations

The muaythai (Note: Muaythai is the official name of Muay Thai, recognized by International World Games Association and International Olympic Committee.) tournaments at the 2022 World Games in Birmingham, Alabama, United States were held from 15 to 17 July 2022 at the Boutwell Memorial Auditorium. Originally scheduled to take place in 2021, the Games were rescheduled for July 2022 as a result of the 2020 Summer Olympics postponement due to the COVID-19 pandemic. It was the second time of muaythai including in the World Games.

== Competition format ==
The number of weight classes for men was reduced from 8 to 6, with the women's weight classes having a corresponding increase from 3 to 6. It was the first time that Muaythai event achieved full gender equality.

Men will contest matches in these six weight classes:

- Featherweight (57 kg)
- Light welterweight (63.5 kg)
- Welterweight (67 kg)
- Light middleweight (71 kg)
- Light heavyweight (81 kg)
- Heavyweight (91 kg)

Women will contest matches in these six weight classes:

- Light flyweight (48 kg)
- Flyweight (51 kg)
- Bantamweight (54 kg)
- Featherweight (57 kg)
- Lightweight (60 kg)
- Light welterweight (63.5 kg)

== Qualification ==
A total of 96 athletes could qualify for muaythai at the 2022 World Games. Each National Olympic Committee could enter a maximum of 12 muaythai practitioners (one in each division). Host nation United States has reserved a spot in each of all 12 events.

== Competition schedule ==
All times are in local time (UTC−5), according to the official schedule correct as of July 2021. This schedule may be subject to change in due time.

Legend
QF	Quarterfinals	SF	Semifinals	F	Finals

M = Morning session, A = Afternoon session, E = Evening session

Date →	Jul 15			Jul 16			Jul 17		
Event ↓	M	A	E	M	A	E	M	A	E
Men's 57 kg		QF			SF		F		
Men's 63.5 kg		QF			SF		F		
Men's 67 kg		QF			SF		F		
Men's 71 kg		QF			SF		F		
Men's 81 kg		QF			SF		F		
Men's 91 kg		QF			SF		F		
Women's 48 kg		QF			SF		F		
Women's 51 kg		QF			SF		F		
Women's 54 kg		QF			SF		F		
Women's 57 kg		QF			SF		F		
Women's 60 kg		QF			SF		F		
Women's 63.5 kg		QF			SF		F		

== Medal table ==
* Host nation (United States)

Rank	Nation	Gold	Silver	Bronze	Total
1	United States*	3	2	3	8
2	Ukraine	3	1	1	5
3	Thailand	2	1	0	3
4	Australia	1	0	1	2
5	Great Britain	1	0	0	1
5	Slovakia	1	0	0	1
5	Vietnam	1	0	0	1
8	Morocco	0	2	0	2
9	Canada	0	1	0	1
9	France	0	1	0	1
9	Israel	0	1	0	1
9	Kazakhstan	0	1	0	1
9	Mexico	0	1	0	1
9	Portugal	0	1	0	1
15	Hungary	0	0	2	2
15	Poland	0	0	2	2
15	United Arab Emirates	0	0	2	2
18	Sweden	0	0	1	1
Totals (18 entries)		12	12	12	36

== Medalists ==
=== Men ===
Event	Gold	Silver	Bronze
– 57 kg	Nguyễn Trần Duy Nhất; Vietnam	Almaz Sarsembekov; Kazakhstan	Vladyslav Mykytas; Ukraine
– 63.5 kg	Igor Liubchenko; Ukraine	Weerasak Tharakhajad; Thailand	Nouredine Samir; United Arab Emirates
– 67 kg	Anueng Khatthamarasri; Thailand	Hamza Rachid; Morocco	Norbert Speth; Hungary
– 71 kg	Thanet Nitutorn; Thailand	Oleksandr Yefimenko; Ukraine	Jordan Weiland; United States
– 81 kg	Aaron Ortiz; United States	Diogo Calado; Portugal	Ilyass Hbibali; United Arab Emirates
– 91 kg	Oleh Pryimachov; Ukraine	Mathew Baker; United States	Łukasz Radosz; Poland

=== Women ===
Event	Gold	Silver	Bronze
– 48 kg	Anastasiia Kulinich; Ukraine	Regan Gowing; Canada	Janet Garcia Borbon; United States
– 51 kg	Monika Chochlíková; Slovakia	Meriem El Moubarik; Morocco	Gabriela Kuzawińska; Poland
– 54 kg	Ashley Thiner; United States	Laura Burgos; Mexico	Yolanda Schmidt; Australia
– 57 kg	Iman Barlow; Great Britain	Tierra Brandt; United States	Patricia Axling; Sweden
– 60 kg	Charlsey Maner; United States	Nili Block; Israel	Ajsa Adel Sandorfi; Hungary
– 63.5 kg	Zoe Putorak; Australia	Nora Cornolle; France	Erin Clayton; United States

== Participating nations ==
The following National Olympic Committees earned spots to compete, with the number of athletes in parentheses. 96 athletes from 39 NOCs are expected to participate. United States was the only delegation to qualify the maximum number of entries (12 athletes total).

- Afghanistan (2)
- Australia (2)
- Austria (2)
- Brazil (2)
- Canada (2)
- Czech Republic (2)
- Finland (1)
- France (3)
- Germany (1)
- Great Britain (2)
- Greece (1)
- Hong Kong (1)
- Hungary (2)
- Iran (3)
- Iraq (2)
- Israel (2)
- Italy (2)
- Kazakhstan (2)
- Malaysia (2)
- Mauritius (2)
- Mexico (1)
- Morocco (4)
- Peru (1)
- Philippines (2)
- Poland (3)
- Portugal (2)
- Saudi Arabia (2)
- Singapore (1)
- Slovakia (2)
- South Korea (1)
- Spain (1)
- Sweden (3)
- Thailand (5)
- Ukraine (5)
- United Arab Emirates (4)
- United States (12)
- Uzbekistan (3)
- Vietnam (2)
