= List of World Games medalists in muaythai =

Muaythai (Note: Muaythai is the official name of Muay Thai, recognized by International World Games Association and International Olympic Committee.) was featured in the World Games official programme for the first time at the 2017 World Games in Wrocław, Poland. It has been played at all editions since then. Muaythai was added to the World Games following the decision of the IWGA Annual General Meeting in May 2013.

The International Federation of Muaythai Associations is governing body for muaythai at the World Games.

== Current events ==
=== Men ===
==== Featherweight (57 kg) ====
Games	Gold	Silver	Bronze
2017 Wrocław	Wiwat Khamtha; Thailand	Aleksandr Abramov; Russia	Almaz Sarsembekov; Kazakhstan
2022 Birmingham	Nguyễn Trần Duy Nhất; Vietnam	Almaz Sarsembekov; Kazakhstan	Vladyslav Mykytas; Ukraine
2025 Chengdu			

==== Light middleweight (71 kg) ====
Games	Gold	Silver	Bronze
2017 Wrocław	Suppachai Muensang; Thailand	Masoud Minaei; Iran	Gabrielle David Mazzetti; Peru
2022 Birmingham	Thanet Nitutorn; Thailand	Oleksandr Yefimenko; Ukraine	Jordan Weiland; United States
2025 Chengdu			

==== Cruiserweight (86 kg) ====
Games	Gold	Silver	Bronze
2025 Chengdu			

=== Women ===
==== Light flyweight (48 kg) ====
Games	Gold	Silver	Bronze
2022 Birmingham	Anastasiia Kulinich; Ukraine	Regan Gowing; Canada	Janet Garcia Borbon; United States
2025 Chengdu			

==== Bantamweight (54 kg) ====
Games	Gold	Silver	Bronze
2017 Wrocław	Sofia Olofsson; Sweden	Valeriya Drozdova; Russia	Meltem Baş; Turkey
2022 Birmingham	Ashley Thiner; United States	Laura Burgos; Mexico	Yolanda Schmidt; Australia
2025 Chengdu			

==== Lightweight (60 kg) ====
Games	Gold	Silver	Bronze
2017 Wrocław	Svetlana Vinnikova; Russia	Gia Winberg; Finland	Nili Block; Israel
2022 Birmingham	Charlsey Maner; United States	Nili Block; Israel	Ajsa Adel Sandorfi; Hungary
2025 Chengdu			

== Discontinued events ==
=== Men ===
==== Bantamweight (54 kg) ====
Games	Gold	Silver	Bronze
2017 Wrocław	Elaman Sayasatov; Kazakhstan	Kevin Martinez; Spain	Aslanbek Zikreev; Russia

==== Light welterweight (63.5 kg) ====
Games	Gold	Silver	Bronze
2017 Wrocław	Igor Liubchenko; Ukraine	Ali Zarinfar; Iran	Oskar Siegert; Poland
2022 Birmingham	Igor Liubchenko; Ukraine	Weerasak Tharakhajad; Thailand	Nouredine Samir; United Arab Emirates

==== Welterweight (67 kg) ====
Games	Gold	Silver	Bronze
2017 Wrocław	Serhii Kuliaba; Ukraine	Vladimir Kuzmin; Russia	Anueng Khatthamarasri; Thailand
2022 Birmingham	Anueng Khatthamarasri; Thailand	Hamza Rachid; Morocco	Norbert Speth; Hungary

==== Middleweight (75 kg) ====
Games	Gold	Silver	Bronze
2017 Wrocław	Vital Hurkou; Belarus	Vasyl Sorokin; Ukraine	Ivan Grigorev; Russia

==== Light heavyweight (81 kg) ====
Games	Gold	Silver	Bronze
2017 Wrocław	Ali Dogan; Turkey	Constantino Nanga; Sweden	Mikita Shostak; Belarus
2022 Birmingham	Aaron Ortiz; United States	Diogo Calado; Portugal	Ilyass Hbibali; United Arab Emirates

==== Heavyweight (91 kg) ====
Games	Gold	Silver	Bronze
2017 Wrocław	Oleh Pryimachov; Ukraine	Łukasz Radosz; Poland	Jakub Klauda; Czech Republic
2022 Birmingham	Oleh Pryimachov; Ukraine	Mathew Baker; United States	Łukasz Radosz; Poland

=== Women ===
==== Flyweight (51 kg) ====
Games	Gold	Silver	Bronze
2017 Wrocław	Bùi Yến Ly; Vietnam	Apasara Koson; Thailand	Janet Todd; United States
2022 Birmingham	Monika Chochlíková; Slovakia	Meriem El Moubarik; Morocco	Gabriela Kuzawińska; Poland

==== Featherweight (57 kg) ====
Games	Gold	Silver	Bronze
2022 Birmingham	Iman Barlow; Great Britain	Tierra Brandt; United States	Patricia Axling; Sweden

==== Light welterweight (63.5 kg) ====
Games	Gold	Silver	Bronze
2022 Birmingham	Zoe Putorak; Australia	Nora Cornolle; France	Erin Clayton; United States

== Statistics ==
=== Medals per year ===
×	NOC did not exist	#	Number of medals won by the NOC	–	NOC did not win any medals

Nation	1981–2013	17	22	Total
Australia		–	2	2
Belarus		2	–	2
Canada		–	1	1
Czech Republic		1	–	1
Finland		1	–	1
France		–	1	1
Great Britain		–	1	1
Hungary		–	1	1
Iran		2	–	2
Israel		1	1	2
Kazakhstan		2	1	3
Mexico		–	1	1
Morocco		–	2	2
Peru		1	–	1
Poland		2	2	4
Portugal		–	1	1
Russia		6	–	6
Slovakia		–	1	1
Spain		1	–	1
Sweden		2	1	3
Thailand		4	3	7
Turkey		2	–	2
Ukraine		4	5	9
United Arab Emirates		–	2	2
United States		1	8	9
Vietnam		1	1	2
