= Muaythai at the 2022 World Games – Men's 71 kg =

World Games muaythai event

Men's 71 kg at the 2022 World Games
- Muaythai pictogram
- Venue: Boutwell Memorial Auditorium
- Dates: 15–17 July 2022
- Competitors: 7 from 7 nations

Medalists
| 1st place, gold medalist(s) | | Thanet Nitutorn | Thailand |
| 2nd place, silver medalist(s) | | Oleksandr Yefimenko | Ukraine |
| 3rd place, bronze medalist(s) | | Jordan Weiland | United States |

The men's 71 kg muaythai (Note: Muaythai is the official name of Muay Thai, recognized by International World Games Association and International Olympic Committee.) event at the 2022 World Games was held from 15 to 17 July 2022 at the Boutwell Memorial Auditorium.

== Competition format ==
Like all World Games muaythai events and other martial arts events, the competition is a straight single-elimination tournament. The competition begins with a quarterfinal round, then a semifinal round, and concludes with a gold medal match. Both semifinal losers compete in a bronze medal match.

Bouts consist of three three-minute rounds with a one-minute break between rounds. A Muay Thai practitioner may win by referee stop contest, knockout or by points. Scoring is on the "10-point-must" system, with 5 judges scoring each round. Judges consider "number of muaythai skills and forcefulness of muaythai skills." Each judge determines a winner for each round, who receives 10 points for the round and assigns the round's loser a number of points between 7 and 9 based on the difference of muaythai skills. The judge's scores for each round are added to give a total score for that judge. The Muay Thai practitioner with the higher score from a majority of the judges is the winner.

== Competition schedule ==
All times are in local time (UTC-5), according to the official schedule.

| Date | Time | Event |
|---|---|---|
| 15 July 2022 | 17:30 | Quarterfinals |
| 16 July 2022 | 15:00 | Semifinals |
| 17 July 2022 | 13:00 | Bronze medal match |
| 17 July 2022 | 13:00 | Gold medal match |

== Results ==
=== Legend ===
- WO — Won by Walkover

=== Bracket ===
Quarterfinals
Oleksandr Yefimenko (UKR) | 29
Gonçalo Noites (POR) | 28
Amine Al-Moatassime (UAE) | 27
Abdelali Zahidi (MAR) | 30
Thanet Nitutorn (THA) | 30
Itai Gershon (ISR) | 27

Semifinals
Jordan Weiland (USA) | 27
Oleksandr Yefimenko (UKR) | 30
Abdelali Zahidi (MAR)
Thanet Nitutorn (THA) | WO

Gold medal match
Oleksandr Yefimenko (UKR) | 27
Thanet Nitutorn (THA) | 30
Bronze medal match
Jordan Weiland (USA) | WO
Abdelali Zahidi (MAR)
