= Greece at the 2022 World Games =

- IOC code: GRE
- NOC: Hellenic Olympic Committee

in Birmingham, United States 7 July 2022 – 17 July 2022
- Competitors: 15 (10 men and 5 women) in 6 sports
- Medals Ranked 34th: Gold 1 Silver 3 Bronze 4 Total 8

World Games appearances (overview)
- 1981; 1985; 1989; 1993; 1997; 2001; 2005; 2009; 2013; 2017; 2022; 2025

Greece competed at the 2022 World Games held in Birmingham, United States from 7 to 17 July 2022. Athletes representing Greece won one gold medal, three silver medals and four bronze medals. The country finished in 34th place in the medal table.

== Medalists ==
Medal	Name	Sport	Event	Date
Gold	Ioakeim Theodoridis	Parkour	Men's freestyle	10 July
Silver	Stylianos Chatziiliadis	Finswimming	Men's 50 m bi-fins	9 July
Silver	Athanasia Zariopi	Ju-jitsu	Women's fighting 48 kg	15 July
Silver	Christina Koutoulaki	Ju-jitsu	Women's fighting 57 kg	15 July
Bronze	Dionysios Xenos	Karate	Men's kumite 67 kg	8 July
Bronze	Christos Bonias	Finswimming	Men's 50 m bi-fins	9 July
Bronze	Christos Bonias	Finswimming	Men's 100 m bi-fins	8 July
Bronze	Anastasios Mylonakis	Finswimming	Men's 100 m surface	8 July

== Competitors ==
The following is the list of number of competitors in the Games.

Sport	Men	Women	Total
Finswimming	6	2	8
Ju-jitsu	0	2	2
Karate	1	1	2
Muaythai	1	0	1
Parkour	1	0	1
Water skiing	1	0	1
Total	10	5	15

== Finswimming ==
Eight swimmers represented Greece in finswimming; in total, they won four medals.

Men

Athlete	Event	Time	Rank
Anastasios Mylonakis	Men's 50 m apnoea	14.75	7
Anastasios Mylonakis	Men's 100 m surface	36.39	3rd place, bronze medalist(s)
Antonios Tsourounakis	Men's 400 m surface	3:06.57	8
Christos Bonias	Men's 50 m bi-fins	18.99	3rd place, bronze medalist(s)
Stylianos Chatziiliadis	Men's 50 m bi-fins	18.74	2nd place, silver medalist(s)
Christos Bonias	Men's 100 m bi-fins	42.59	3rd place, bronze medalist(s)
Stylianos Chatziiliadis	Men's 100 m bi-fins	42.68	4
Georgios Kaltsoukalas; Anastasios Mylonakis; Georgios Panagoitidis; Antonios Tsourounakis	Men's 4 × 50 m surface relay	1:02.87	4
Georgios Kaltsoukalas; Anastasios Mylonakis; Georgios Panagoitidis; Antonios Tsourounakis	Men's 4 × 100 m surface relay	2:23.68	4

Women

Athlete	Event	Time	Rank
Eirini Deligianni	Women's 200 m surface	1:32.96	5
Aikaterini Maniati	Women's 100 m bi-fins	49.90	8

== Ju-jitsu ==
Greece won two medals in ju-jitsu.

Athlete	Event	Elimination round			Semifinal	Final / BM	
Athlete	Event	Opposition Result	Opposition Result	Rank	Opposition Result	Opposition Result	Rank
Athanasia Zariopi	Women's fighting 48 kg	Phattaraboonsorn (THA); L 0–14	Guzman Sanchez (COL); W 8–0	2 Q	Staub (SUI); W 14–0	Phattaraboonsorn (THA); L 0–14	2nd place, silver medalist(s)
Christina Koutoulaki	Women's fighting 57 kg	Pourtois (BEL); L 2–10	Campos Obando (COL); W 14–0	2 Q	Bogers (NED); W 16–10	Pourtois (BEL); L WO	2nd place, silver medalist(s)

== Karate ==
Greece won one medal in karate.

Men

Athlete	Event	Elimination round				Semifinal	Final / BM	
Athlete	Event	Opposition Result	Opposition Result	Opposition Result	Rank	Opposition Result	Opposition Result	Rank
Dionysios Xenos	Men's kumite 67 kg	Nakano (JPN); W 1–0	Pavlov (MKD); W 6–0	Figueira (BRA); D 0–0	1 Q	Tadissi (HUN); L 0–3	Maresca (ITA); W 1–0	3rd place, bronze medalist(s)

Women

Athlete	Event	Elimination round				Semifinal	Final / BM	
Athlete	Event	Opposition Result	Opposition Result	Opposition Result	Rank	Opposition Result	Opposition Result	Rank
Eleni Chatziliadou	Women's kumite +68 kg	Jemi (TUN); D 1–1	Keinänen (FIN); L 0–3	Okila (EGY); W 3–1	3	Did not advance		5

== Muaythai ==
Greece competed in muaythai.

Athlete	Event	Quarterfinal	Semifinal	Final / BM	
Athlete	Event	Opposition Result	Opposition Result	Opposition Result	Rank
Dimos Asimakopoulous	–67 kg	Khatthamarasri (THA); L 27–30	Did not advance		

== Parkour ==
Greece won one gold medal in parkour.

Athlete	Event	Qualification		Final	
Athlete	Event	Result	Rank	Result	Rank
Ioakeim Theodoridis	Men's speedrun	24.68	6 Q	28.70	6
Ioakeim Theodoridis	Men's freestyle	23.5	1 Q	26.0	1st place, gold medalist(s)

== Water skiing ==
Filippos Kyprios was scheduled to represent Greece in water skiing. He did not start in the event.

Athlete	Event	Qualification		Final	
Athlete	Event	Result	Rank	Result	Rank
Filippos Kyprios	Slalom	DNS			

== See also ==
- Greece at the World Games
