= Ju-jitsu at the 2022 World Games – Women's fighting 48 kg =

Women's fighting 48 kg at the 2022 World Games
- Venue: Birmingham–Southern College
- Date: 15 July 2022
- Competitors: 6 from 6 nations

Medalists
1st place, gold medalist(s)		(Thailand) Kanjutha Phattaraboonsorn
2nd place, silver medalist(s)		(Greece) Athanasia Zariopi
3rd place, bronze medalist(s)		(France) Sandra Badie

The women's fighting 48 kg competition in ju-jitsu at the 2022 World Games took place on 15 July 2022 at the Birmingham–Southern College in Birmingham, United States.

== Results ==
=== Elimination round ===
==== Group A ====
Rank	Athlete	B	W	L	Pts	Score
1	Kanjutha Phattaraboonsorn (THA)	2	2	0	28–0	+28
2	Athanasia Zariopi (GRE)	2	1	1	8–14	–6
3	Katherine Guzman Sanchez (COL)	2	0	2	0–22	–22

	Score	
Kanjutha Phattaraboonsorn (THA)	14–0	Katherine Guzman Sanchez (COL)
Kanjutha Phattaraboonsorn (THA)	14–0	Athanasia Zariopi (GRE)
Katherine Guzman Sanchez (COL)	0–8	Athanasia Zariopi (GRE)

==== Group B ====
Rank	Athlete	B	W	L	Pts	Score
1	Sina Staub (SUI)	2	2	0	24–5	+19
2	Sandra Badie (FRA)	2	1	1	19–13	+6
3	Anna Fuhrmann (AUT)	2	0	2	0–25	–25

	Score	
Sina Staub (SUI)	11–0	Anna Fuhrmann (AUT)
Sina Staub (SUI)	13–5	Sandra Badie (FRA)
Anna Fuhrmann (AUT)	0–14	Sandra Badie (FRA)

=== Finals ===
Semifinals
Kanjutha Phattaraboonsorn (THA)	11
Sandra Badie (FRA)	7
Sina Staub (SUI)	0
Athanasia Zariopi (GRE)	14

Final
Kanjutha Phattaraboonsorn (THA)	14
Athanasia Zariopi (GRE)	0
Third place
Sandra Badie (FRA)	8
Sina Staub (SUI)	6
