= Air sports at the 2022 World Games =

- Venue: Barber Motorsports Park
- Dates: 9–12 July 2022
- No. of events: 2

The air sports competition at the 2022 World Games took place in July 2022, in Birmingham, Alabama, United States, at the Barber Motorsports Park. Originally scheduled to take place in July 2021, the Games have been rescheduled for July 2022 as a result of the 2020 Summer Olympics postponement due to the COVID-19 pandemic. Drone racing was included in the World Games programme as an exhibition, and the results could be included in the medal table.

== Participating nations ==
- Argentina (2)
- Australia (1)
- Belarus (1)
- Czech Republic (1)
- Denmark (1)
- France (4)
- Germany (4)
- Italy (3)
- Lithuania (2)
- Norway (1)
- New Zealand (1)
- Russia (4)
- Slovakia (1)
- United Arab Emirates (2)
- United States (10)

== Medal table ==
* Host nation (United States)

Rank	Nation	Gold	Silver	Bronze	Total
1	France	2	0	0	2
2	Poland	0	1	0	1
2	United States*	0	1	0	1
4	Spain	0	0	1	1
4	United Arab Emirates	0	0	1	1
Totals (5 entries)		2	2	2	6

== Events ==
Event	Gold	Silver	Bronze
Drone racing	Killian Rousseau; France	Paweł Laszczak; Poland	Álex Zamora; Spain
Parachuting	Cédric Veiga Rios; France	Nick Batsch; United States	Abdulbari Al-Qubaisi; United Arab Emirates
