= Ju-jitsu at the 2022 World Games – Women's fighting 57 kg =

Women's fighting 57 kg at the 2022 World Games
- Venue: Birmingham–Southern College
- Date: 15 July 2022
- Competitors: 6 from 6 nations

Medalists
1st place, gold medalist(s)		(Belgium) Licai Pourtois
2nd place, silver medalist(s)		(Greece) Christina Koutoulaki
3rd place, bronze medalist(s)		(Denmark) Rebekka Dahl

The women's fighting 57 kg competition in ju-jitsu at the 2022 World Games took place on 15 July 2022 at the Birmingham–Southern College in Birmingham, United States.

== Results ==
=== Elimination round ===
==== Group A ====
Rank	Athlete	B	W	L	Pts	Score
1	Licai Pourtois (BEL)	2	2	0	24–2	+22
2	Christina Koutoulaki (GRE)	2	1	1	16–10	+6
3	Margarita Rosa Campos Obando (COL)	2	0	2	0–28	–28

	Score	
Licai Pourtois (BEL)	14–0	Margarita Rosa Campos Obando (COL)
Licai Pourtois (BEL)	10–2	Christina Koutoulaki (GRE)
Margarita Rosa Campos Obando (COL)	0–14	Christina Koutoulaki (GRE)

==== Group B ====
Rank	Athlete	B	W	L	Pts	Score
1	Genevieve Bogers (NED)	2	2	0	25–9	+16
2	Rebekka Dahl (DEN)	2	1	1	21–14	+7
3	Nuchanat Singchalad (THA)	2	0	2	2–25	–23

	Score	
Nuchanat Singchalad (THA)	2–11	Genevieve Bogers (NED)
Nuchanat Singchalad (THA)	0–14	Rebekka Dahl (DEN)
Genevieve Bogers (NED)	14–7	Rebekka Dahl (DEN)

=== Finals ===
Semifinals
Licai Pourtois (BEL)	16
Rebekka Dahl (DEN)	4
Genevieve Bogers (NED)	10
Christina Koutoulaki (GRE)	16

Final
Licai Pourtois (BEL)	0
Christina Koutoulaki (GRE)	0
Third place
Rebekka Dahl (DEN)	6
Genevieve Bogers (NED)	6
