= Mauritius at the 2022 World Games =

- IOC code: MRI
- NOC: Mauritius Olympic Committee

in Birmingham, United States 7 July 2022 – 17 July 2022
- Competitors: 2 (1 man and 1 woman) in 2 sports and 2 events
- Medals: Gold 0 Silver 0 Bronze 0 Total 0

World Games appearances
- 1981; 1985; 1989; 1993; 1997; 2001; 2005; 2009; 2013; 2017; 2022

Mauritius competed at the 2022 World Games held in Birmingham, United States from 7 to 17 July 2022.

== Competitors ==
The following is the list of number of competitors in the Games.

Sport	Men	Women	Total
Ju-jitsu	0	1	1
Muaythai	1	0	1
Total	1	1	2

== Ju-jitsu ==
Mauritius competed in ju-jitsu.

Athlete	Category	Group stage			Semifinals	Final/Bronze medal bout	
Athlete	Category	Opposition Result	Opposition Result	Rank	Opposition Result	Opposition Result	Rank
Marie Chandrine Perrine	Women's fighting 63 kg	Ferreira (FRA); W 14–0	Van der Brugge (NED); L 0–16	3	did not advance		

== Muaythai ==
Mauritius competed in muaythai.

Athlete	Category	Quarterfinals	Semifinals	Final/Bronze medal bout	
Athlete	Category	Opposition Result	Opposition Result	Opposition Result	Rank
James Agathe	Men's 81 kg	Ortiz (USA); L WO	did not advance		
