= Ju-jitsu at the 2022 World Games =

- Venue: Birmingham–Southern College
- Dates: 15–16 July
- No. of events: 18

The ju-jitsu competition at the 2022 World Games took place in July 2022, in Birmingham in United States, at the Birmingham–Southern College. Originally scheduled to take place in July 2021, the Games were rescheduled for July 2022 as a result of the 2020 Summer Olympics postponement due to the COVID-19 pandemic.

== Medal table ==
* Host nation (United States)

Rank	Nation	Gold	Silver	Bronze	Total
1	Germany	3	1	3	7
1	Israel	3	1	3	7
3	Thailand	2	2	0	4
4	France	2	1	2	5
4	United Arab Emirates	2	1	2	5
6	Belgium	2	1	0	3
7	Serbia	1	1	0	2
7	Ukraine	1	1	0	2
9	Canada	1	0	1	2
9	Slovenia	1	0	1	2
11	Greece	0	2	0	2
12	Netherlands	0	1	3	4
13	Denmark	0	1	2	3
14	Bahrain	0	1	0	1
14	Colombia	0	1	0	1
14	Kazakhstan	0	1	0	1
14	Kyrgyzstan	0	1	0	1
14	Morocco	0	1	0	1
19	Switzerland	0	0	1	1
Totals (19 entries)		18	18	18	54

== Medalists ==
=== Fighting ===
Event	Gold	Silver	Bronze
Men's 62 kg	Bohdan Mochulskyi; Ukraine	Alejandro Viviescas; Colombia	Ecco van der Veer; Netherlands
Men's 69 kg	Jaschar Salmanow; Germany	Ivan Della Croce; Serbia	Tim Toplak; Slovenia
Men's 77 kg	Simon Attenberger; Germany	Lucas Andersen; Denmark	Boy Vogelzang; Netherlands
Men's 85 kg	Nikola Trajković; Serbia	Donny Donker; Netherlands	Daniel Zmeev; Germany
Women's 48 kg	Kanjutha Phattaraboonsorn; Thailand	Athanasia Zariopi; Greece	Sandra Badie; France
Women's 57 kg	Licai Pourtois; Belgium	Christina Koutoulaki; Greece	Rebekka Dahl; Denmark
Women's 63 kg	Juliana Ferreira; France	Orapa Senatham; Thailand	Lilian Weiken; Germany
Women's 70 kg	Annalena Bauer; Germany	Chloé Lalande; France	Liva Tanzer; Denmark

=== Ne-waza ===
Event	Gold	Silver	Bronze
Men's 69 kg	Florian Bayili; Belgium	Mohamed Al-Suwaidi; United Arab Emirates	Viki Dabush; Israel
Men's 77 kg	Nimrod Ryeder; Israel	Ali Munfaredi; Bahrain	Michael Sheehan; Canada
Men's 85 kg	Faisal Al-Ketbi; United Arab Emirates	Abdurahmanhaji Murtazaliev; Kyrgyzstan	Saar Shemesh; Israel
Men's open	Faisal Al-Ketbi; United Arab Emirates	Seif-Eddine Houmine; Morocco	Saar Shemesh; Israel
Women's 48 kg	Vicky Hoang; Canada	Kanjutha Phattaraboonsorn; Thailand	Irina Brodski; Germany
Women's 57 kg	Meshy Rosenfeld; Israel	Galina Duvanova; Kazakhstan	Laurence Fouillat; France
Women's 63 kg	Maja Povšnar; Slovenia	Rony Nisimian; Israel	Shamma Al-Kalbani; United Arab Emirates
Women's open	Meshy Rosenfeld; Israel	Bogdana Golub; Ukraine	Shamma Al-Kalbani; United Arab Emirates

=== Team ===
Event	Gold	Silver	Bronze
Mixed duo	Thailand; Lalita Yuennan; Warawut Saengsriruang	Belgium; Charis Gravensteyn; Ian Lodens	Switzerland; Sofia Jokl; Thomas Schönenberger
National team competition	France; Sandra Badie; Valentin Blumental; Juliana Ferreira; Laurence Fouillat; Percy Kunsa; Chloé Lalande; Julien Mathieu	Germany; Simon Attenberger; Annalena Bauer; Irina Brodski; Julia Paszkiewicz; Jaschar Salmanow; Johannes Tourbeslis; Lilian Weiken; Daniel Zmeev	Netherlands; Genevieve Bogers; Anne van der Brugge; Lidija Caković; Donny Donker; Aafke van Leeuwen; Ecco van der Veer; Boy Vogelzang; Stefan Vukotić
