= Bowling at the 2022 World Games – Men's singles =

Bowling – Men's singles at the 2022 World Games
- Venue: Birmingham–Jefferson Convention Complex, Birmingham, United States
- Dates: 8–11 July 2022
- Competitors: 32 from 16 nations

Medalists
gold medal	(Australia) Sam Cooley
silver medal	(Czech Republic) Jaroslav Lorenc
bronze medal	(Canada) Graham Fach

The men's singles event in bowling at the 2022 World Games took place from 8 to 11 July 2022 at the Birmingham–Jefferson Convention Complex in Birmingham, United States.

== Competition format ==
A total of 32 athletes entered the competition. They competed in knock-out system.

== Results ==
=== Competition bracket ===
Round of 32; 8 July
(France) Valentin Saulnier	1
(Colombia) Andrés Gómez	2
(Malaysia) Timmy Tan	2
(South Africa) Jivi Sewchuran	1
(Kuwait) Mostafa Al-Mousawi	0
(Italy) Salvatore Polizzotto	2
(Canada) Darren Alexander	2
(China) Wang Hongbo	0
(Australia) Sam Cooley	2
(Costa Rica) Jonaykel Conejo	1
(United States) Trent Mitchell	2
(Puerto Rico) Edgar J Burgos	1
(South Korea) Park Dong-hyun	2
(Germany) Pascal Winternheimer	1
(Denmark) Jesper Agerbo	2
(Czech Republic) Jan Macek	1
(China) Jianchao Du	2
(Denmark) Dan Ostergaard-Poulsen	0
(Italy) Pierpaolo De Filippi	2
(France) Gaetan Mouveroux	0
(South Africa) Cherng-Shiaw Ju	0
(Czech Republic) Jaroslav Lorenc	2
(Puerto Rico) David Marquez	0
(Colombia) Jaime González	2
(South Korea) Kim Dong-hyeon	2
(Kuwait) Hassan Qassem	0
(Australia) Callum Borck	0
(Malaysia) Rafiq Ismail	2
(United States) Alec Kiplinger	2
(Costa Rica) Juan Jose Rodriguez	1
(Germany) Andreas Hernitschek	1
(Canada) Graham Fach	2

Round of 16; 10 July
(Colombia) Andrés Gómez	0
(Malaysia) Timmy Tan	2
(Italy) Salvatore Polizzotto	1
(Canada) Darren Alexander	2
(Australia) Sam Cooley	2
(United States) Trent Mitchell	0
(South Korea) Park Dong-hyun	2
(Denmark) Jesper Agerbo	1
(China) Jianchao Du	2
(Italy) Pierpaolo De Filippi	0
(Czech Republic) Jaroslav Lorenc	2
(Colombia) Jaime González	1
(South Korea) Kim Dong-hyeon	0
(Malaysia) Rafiq Ismail	2
(United States) Alec Kiplinger	0
(Canada) Graham Fach	2

Quarter-finals; 10 July
(Malaysia) Timmy Tan	1
(Canada) Darren Alexander	2
(Australia) Sam Cooley	2
(South Korea) Park Dong-hyun	1
(China) Jianchao Du	0
(Czech Republic) Jaroslav Lorenc	2
(Malaysia) Rafiq Ismail	1
(Canada) Graham Fach	2

Semi-finals; 10 July
(Canada) Darren Alexander	0
(Australia) Sam Cooley	2
(Czech Republic) Jaroslav Lorenc	2
(Canada) Graham Fach	1

Finals; 11 July
(Australia) Sam Cooley	2
(Czech Republic) Jaroslav Lorenc	1
Third place
(Canada) Darren Alexander	1
(Canada) Graham Fach	2
