= Australia at the 2022 World Games =

- IOC code: AUS
- NOC: Australian Olympic Committee

in Birmingham, United States 7 July 2022 – 17 July 2022
- Competitors: 98 (35 men and 63 women)
- Medals Ranked 23rd: Gold 3 Silver 1 Bronze 2 Total 6

World Games appearances
- 1981; 1985; 1989; 1993; 1997; 2001; 2005; 2009; 2013; 2017; 2022; 2025

Australia competed at the 2022 World Games held in Birmingham, United States from 7 to 17 July 2022. Athletes representing Australia won three gold medals, one silver medal and two bronze medals. The country finished in 23rd place in the medal table.

== Medallists ==
Medal	Name	Sport	Event	Date
Gold	Sam Cooley	Bowling	Men's singles	11 July
Gold	Nic Rapa	Water skiing	Men's wakeboard	16 July
Gold	Zoe Putorak	Muaythai	Women's 63.5 kg	17 July
Silver	Mixed team	Flying disc	Mixed tournament	16 July
Bronze	Women's team	Lacrosse	Women's tournament	16 July
Bronze	Breanah Cauchi	Trampoline gymnastics	Women's tumbling	16 July

== Acrobatic gymnastics ==
Australia competed in acrobatic gymnastics.

== Archery ==
Australia competed in archery.

Athlete	Event	Ranking round		Round of 32	Round of 16	Quarterfinals	Semifinals	Final / BM
Athlete	Event	Score	Rank	Opposition Result	Opposition Result	Opposition Result	Opposition Result	Opposition Result
Danie Oosthuizen	Men's compound	696	16	(South Korea) Kim; L 144^{9}–144^{9+}	did not advance			

== Beach handball ==
Australia competed in beach handball.

== Bowling ==
Australia won one gold medal in bowling.

== Duathlon ==
Australia competed in duathlon.

== Flying disc ==
Australia won the silver medal in the flying disc competition.

== Karate ==
Australia competed in karate.

Men

Athlete	Event	Elimination round				Semifinal	Final / BM	
Athlete	Event	Opposition Result	Opposition Result	Opposition Result	Rank	Opposition Result	Opposition Result	Rank
Daniel Tielen	Men's kumite +84 kg	Kvesić (CRO); L 0–9	Irr (USA); L 0–3	Tarek (EGY); L 1–4	4	Did not advance		7

== Lacrosse ==
Australia won the bronze medal in the women's tournament.

== Muaythai ==
Australia won one gold medal in muaythai.

== Orienteering ==
Australia competed in orienteering.

== Parkour ==
Australia competed in parkour.

== Rhythmic gymnastics ==
Australia competed in rhythmic gymnastics.

== Softball ==
Australia finished in 4th place in the softball tournament.

== Sport climbing ==
Australia competed in sport climbing.

== Squash ==
Australia competed in squash.

== Trampoline gymnastics ==
Australia won one bronze medal in trampoline gymnastics.

== Water skiing ==
Australia won one gold medal in water skiing / wakeboarding.
