= Canada at the 2022 World Games =

- IOC code: CAN
- NOC: Canadian Olympic Committee

in Birmingham, United States 7 July 2022 – 17 July 2022
- Competitors: 132 (70 men and 62 women) in 22 sports
- Medals Ranked 14th: Gold 5 Silver 5 Bronze 5 Total 15

World Games appearances
- 1981; 1985; 1989; 1993; 1997; 2001; 2005; 2009; 2013; 2017; 2022; 2025

Canada competed at the 2022 World Games held in Birmingham, Alabama, from 7 to 17 July 2022. Athletes representing Canada won five gold medals, five silver medals and five bronze medals. The country finished in 14th place in the medal table.

== Medallists ==
Medal	Name	Sport	Event	Date
Gold	Rhaea Stinn	Powerlifting	Women's super heavyweight	10 July
Gold	Neilly Ross	Water skiing	Women's tricks	15 July
Gold	Vicky Hoang	Ju-jitsu	Women's ne-waza 48 kg	15 July
Gold	Women's team	Lacrosse	Women's tournament	16 July
Silver	Graham Fach; Darren Alexander	Bowling	Men's doubles	11 July
Silver	Jaimee Bull	Water skiing	Women's slalom	15 July
Silver	Taryn Grant	Water skiing	Women's jump	16 July
Silver	Regan Gowing	Muaythai	Women's 48 kg	17 July
Bronze	Christopher Perkins	Archery	Men's compound individual	9 July
Bronze	Graham Fach	Bowling	Men's singles	11 July
Bronze	Cole McCormick	Water skiing	Men's slalom	15 July
Bronze	Michael Sheehan	Ju-jitsu	Men's ne-waza 77 kg	15 July

=== Invitational sports ===
Medal	Name	Sport	Event	Date
Gold	Men's team	Lacrosse	Men's tournament	12 July
Silver	Winnie Cai	Wushu	Women's jianshu & qiangshu	12 July
Bronze	Jason Chen-Leung	Wushu	Men's jianshu & qiangshu	13 July

== Competitors ==
The following is the list of number of competitors in the Games.

Sport	Men	Women	Total
Archery	1	0	1
Boules sports	0	2	2
Bowling	2	0	2
Cue sports	1	1	2
Dancesport	1	1	2
Floorball	14	0	14
Flying disc	7	8	15
Inline hockey	14	0	14
Ju-jitsu	1	1	2
Karate	0	3	3
Kickboxing	1	2	3
Lacrosse	12	12	24
Muaythai	1	3	4
Orienteering	2	2	4
Powerlifting	0	1	1
Racquetball	1	1	2
Softball	0	13	13
Squash	1	2	3
Trampoline gymnastics	2	3	5
Water skiing	1	3	4
Wheelchair rugby	6	2	8
Wushu	2	2	4
Total	70	62	132

== Archery ==
Canada competed in archery.

Men

Athlete	Event	Ranking round		Round of 32	Round of 16	Quarterfinals	Semi-finals	Final / BM	
Athlete	Event	Score	Seed	Opposition Result	Opposition Result	Opposition Result	Opposition Result	Opposition Result	Rank
Christopher Perkins	Men's compound	713	2	Bye	(United States) Lutz; W 148–146	(Poland) Przybylski; W 148–145	(Mexico) Becerra; L 145–147	(India) Verma; W 148–145	3rd place, bronze medalist(s)

== Boules sports ==
Canada competed in boules sports.

== Bowling ==
Canada won two medals in bowling.

== Cue sports ==
Canada competed in cue sports.

== Floorball ==
Canada competed in the floorball tournament.

Summary

Team	Event	Group stage				Semi-final	Final / BM / Pl.	
Team	Event	Opposition Score	Opposition Score	Opposition Score	Rank	Opposition Score	Opposition Score	Rank
Canada men's	Men's tournament	Finland; L 0–18	United States; W 9–3	Czech Republic; L 0–17	3	Did not advance	Switzerland; L 1–12	6

Group play

Pos	Team	Pld	W	D	L	GF	GA	GD	Pts	Qualification
1	Finland	3	3	0	0	39	3	+36	6	Semifinals
2	Czech Republic	3	2	0	1	33	6	+27	4	Semifinals
3	Canada	3	1	0	2	9	38	−29	2	Fifth place game
4	United States (H)	3	0	0	3	4	38	−34	0	Seventh place game

Source: IFF
(H) Hosts

8 July 2022; 12:00	Finland	18–0 (5–0, 6–0, 7–0)	Canada	BJCC East Exhibition Hall, Birmingham; Attendance: 119

IFF

9 July 2022; 18:00	United States	3–9 (0–2, 1–2, 2–5)	Canada	BJCC East Exhibition Hall, Birmingham; Attendance: 703

IFF

10 July 2022; 15:30	Czech Republic	17–0 (4–0, 7–0, 6–0)	Canada	BJCC East Exhibition Hall, Birmingham; Attendance: 204

IFF

Fifth place game

11 July 2022; 17:45	Switzerland	12–1 (2–1, 0–0, 10–0)	Canada	BJCC East Exhibition Hall, Birmingham; Attendance: 112

IFF

== Flying disc ==
Canada competed in the flying disc competition.

== Inline hockey ==
Canada competed in the inline hockey tournament.

== Ju-jitsu ==
Canada won two medals in ju-jitsu.

== Karate ==
Canada competed in karate.

Women

Athlete	Event	Elimination round				Semi-final	Final / BM	
Athlete	Event	Opposition Result	Opposition Result	Opposition Result	Rank	Opposition Result	Opposition Result	Rank
Kathryn Campbell	Women's kumite 55 kg	Allen (USA); L 1–8	Youssef (EGY); L 1–9	Messerschmidt (GER); L 0–6	4	Did not advance		7
Haya Jumaa	Women's kumite 61 kg	Suchánková (SVK); W 3–2	Nilsson (SWE); W 2–0	Grande (PER); L 0–2	3	Did not advance		5
Melissa Bratic	Women's kumite 68 kg	Lingl (USA); L 2–3	Semeraro (ITA); L 0–4	Buchinger (AUT); L 0–2	4	Did not advance		7

== Kickboxing ==
Canada competed in kickboxing.

== Lacrosse ==
Canada won the gold medal in both the men's and women's lacrosse tournaments.

== Muaythai ==
Canada competed in muaythai.

== Orienteering ==
Canada competed in orienteering.

== Powerlifting ==
Canada won one gold medal in powerlifting.

Women

Athlete	Event	Exercises			Total weight	Total points	Rank
Athlete	Event	Squat	Bench press	Deadlift	Total weight	Total points	Rank
Rhaea Stinn	Women's super heavyweight	255.0	227.0	215.0	697.0	110.01	1st place, gold medalist(s)

== Racquetball ==
Canada competed in racquetball.

== Softball ==
Canada finished in 6th place in the softball tournament.

== Squash ==
Canada competed in squash.

== Trampoline gymnastics ==
Canada competed in trampoline gymnastics.

== Water skiing ==
Canada won four medals in water skiing.

== Wheelchair rugby ==
Canada competed in wheelchair rugby.

== Wushu ==
Canada won two medals in wushu.
