= Zoe Putorak =

Australian Muay Thai fighter (born 1999)

- Born: August 3, 1999 (age 27); Canberra, Australia
- Nickname: My Way
- Height: 177 cm (5 ft 10 in)
- Weight: 63.5 kg (140 lb; 10 st 0 lb)
- Style: Muay Thai
- Stance: Orthodox
- Fighting out of: Canberra, Australia
- Team: Sabai Muay Thai
- Trainer: Lee Fook

Professional boxing record
- Total: 4
- Losses: 2
- Draws: 2

Kickboxing record
- Total: 49
- Wins: 46
- By knockout: 14
- Losses: 3
- Draws: 0

Other information
- Boxing record from BoxRec

Zoe Putorak (born August 3, 1999) is an Australian Muay Thai fighter.

== Biography and career ==
Putorak started training in Muay Thai at the age 9 and made her fighting debut in 2013 at the age of 14. She quickly rose to prominence and captured the 2016 IFMA Youth World Champinship gold medal.

On August 27, 2022, Putorak faced Steph Glew at NT Fight Series IV in Darwin, Australia, for the vacant WBC Muay Thai Australia Welterweight title. She won the fight by decision.

Putorak won her second WBC Muay Thai Australian title on February 18, 2023, when she defeated Jessie Geyl by third-round technical knockout at Muay Thai League 6.

On February 17, 2024, Putorak faced Bree Knitter for the inaugural WBC Muay Thai World Super-Lightweight title.at 1774 Muaythai Series 9. She won the fight by split decision.

On January 25, 2025, Putorak defended her WBC Muay Thai World Super-Lightweight title.against Kendall Stewart at NT Fight Series. She won the fight by first-round technical knockout.

On February 28, 2026, Putorak successfully defended her WBC Muay Thai World Super-Lightweight title for the fourth time, defeating Sigrid Kapanen by unanimous decision at Capital Combat Club.

== Titles and accomplishments ==
=== Professional ===
==== Muay Thai ====
- World Boxing Council
  - 2022 WBC Muay Thai Australia Welterweight (147 lbs) Champion
  - 2023 WBC Muay Thai Australia Super-Lightweight (140 lbs) Champion
  - 2024 WBC Muay Thai World Super-Lightweight (140 lbs) Champion
    - Four successful title defenses
- World Muaythai Council
  - 2018 WMC Australia 63.5 kg Champion
    - One successful title defense
  - 2026 WMC World Welterweight Champion
- World Kickboxing Federation
  - 2017 WKBF Muay Thai NSW State Champion

==== Kickboxing ====
- Spartans Cup Championship
  - 2026 SCC World Super Lightweight (-64 kg) Champion
- World Association of Kickboxing Organizations
  - 2017 WAKO K-1 Oceania Champion

=== Amateur ===
==== Muay Thai ====
- International Federation of Muaythai Associations
  - 2016 IFMA Youth World Championships (U-17) -67 kg (gold)
  - 2018 IFMA World Championships -67 kg (silver)
  - 2019 IFMA World Championships -63.5 kg (gold)
  - 2019 IFMA Rising Star Award
  - 2019 IFMA Breakthrough of the Year Award
  - 2023 IFMA World Championships -63.5 kg (gold)
  - 2024 IFMA World Championships -63.5 kg (gold)
  - 2025 IFMA World Championships -63.5 kg (gold)
  - 2026 IFMA World Championships -63.5 kg (gold)
- World Games
  - 2022 World Games Muay Thai -63.5 kg (gold)
- World Combat Games
  - 2023 World Combat Games Muay Thai -63.5 kg (gold)
- Arafura Games
  - 2019 Arafura Games Muay Thai -63.5 kg (gold)

==== Kickboxing ====
- World Association of Kickboxing Organizations
  - 2023 WAKO World Championships K-1 -65 kg (gold)

== Muay Thai and Kickboxing record ==
Professional Muay Thai and Kickboxing record
31 Wins (12 (T)KOs), 3 Losses, 0 Draw
Date	Result	Opponent	Event	Location	Method	Round	Time
2026-09-05	Win	(New Zealand) Emma Diprose	Infliction Fight Series 40	Gold Coast, Queensland, Australia	TKO (Body kick)	2	2:59
Wins the vacant WMC World Welterweight title.
2026-04-18	Win	(Australia) Michaela Jenkins	Spartans Cup Championship 26	Melbourne, Australia	Decision (Unanimous)	5	3:00
Wins the vacant SCC World Super Lightweight (-64kg) title.
2026-02-28	Win	(Estonia) Sigrid Kapanen	Capital Combat Club	Canberra, Australia	Decision (Unanimous)	5	3:00
Defends WBC Muay Thai World Super-Lightweight (140 lbs) title.
2025-02-22	Win	(Australia) Katie Rose Mitchell	1774 Muaythai Series 12	Sydney, Australia	Decision (Split)	5	3:00
Defends WBC Muay Thai World Super-Lightweight (140 lbs) title.
2025-01-25	Win	(Australia) Kendall Stewart	NT Fight Series	Darwin, Australia	TKO (Elbows)	1	
Defends WBC Muay Thai World Super-Lightweight (140 lbs) title.
2024-04-27	Win	(New Zealand) Kaitlyn Tucker	Muay Thai League 10	Southport, Australia	Decision (Unanimous)	5	3:00
Defends WBC Muay Thai World Super-Lightweight (140 lbs) title.
2024-02-17	Win	(United States) Bree Knitter	1774 Muaythai Series 9	Sydney, Australia	Decision (Split)	5	3:00
Wins the inaugural WBC Muay Thai World Super-Lightweight (140 lbs) title.
2023-02-18	Win	(Australia) Jessie Geyl	Muay Thai League 6	Southport, Australia	TKO (Doctor stoppage)	3	0:34
Wins the WBC Muay Thai Australia Super-Lightweight (140 lbs) title.
2022-08-27	Win	(Australia) Steph Glew	NT Fight Series IV	Darwin, Australia	Decision	5	3:00
Wins the vacant WBC Muay Thai Australia Welterweight (147 lbs) title.
2020-02-29	Win	(Australia) Victoria Sullivan	Futures Muay Thai 2	Mandurah, Australia	Decision (Unanimous)	5	3:00
Defends the WMC Muay Thai Australia Super-Lightweight 63.5kg title.
2019-03-23	Win	(Australia) Claire Baxter	Siam 2 Sydney Pro	Sydney, Australia	Decision (Split)	5	3:00
2018-10-13	Win	(Australia) Leonie Macks	Phoenix Combat Sports	Australia	Decision (Unanimous)	5	3:00
Wins the WMC Muay Thai Australia Super-Lightweight 63.5kg title.
2018-03-23	Loss	(Australia) Steph Glew	EPIC 18	Perth, Australia	Decision	5	2:00
2017-11-04	Win	(Australia) Hannah Bradicich	Coastal Warfare 13	Australia	Decision	5	2:00
2017-04-29	Win	(Australia) Whitney Geohagen		Australia			
Wins the WKBF NSW State title.
2017-03-18	Win	(New Zealand)		Melbourne, Australia	Decision (Unanimous)	3	3:00
Wins the WAKO K-1 Oceania title.
2016-11-12	Win	(Australia) Janelle Adamczyk	Knees of Fury 61	Adelaide, Australia	Decision (Unanimous)	5	2:00
Legend: Win Loss Draw/No contest Notes

Amateur Muay Thai and Kickboxing record
Date	Result	Opponent	Event	Location	Method	Round	Time
2026-06-25	Win	(Russia) Marina Changelia	2026 IFMA Senior World Championship, Final	Kuala Lumpur, Malaysia	Decision (30:27)	3	3:00
Wins the 2026 IFMA World Championship -63.5kg Gold medal.
2026-06-24	Win	(Belarus) Darya Bialkova	2026 IFMA Senior World Championship, Semifinals	Kuala Lumpur, Malaysia	Decision (30:27)	3	3:00
2026-06-23	Win	(Finland) Eveliina Rauhansalo	2026 IFMA Senior World Championship, Quarterfinals	Kuala Lumpur, Malaysia	TKO	1	
2025-05-31	Win	(United States) Jordan Smelker	2025 IFMA Senior World Championship, Final	Kemer, Turkey	Decision (30:27)	3	3:00
Wins the 2025 IFMA World Championship -63.5kg Gold medal.
2025-05-30	Win	(Poland) Nikola Błąkała	2025 IFMA Senior World Championship, Semifinals	Kemer, Turkey	TKO	1	
2024-06-09	Win	(Turkey) Bediha Sahin	2024 IFMA Senior World Championship, Final	Patras, Greece	Decision (29:28)	3	3:00
Wins the 2024 IFMA World Championship -63.5kg Gold medal.
2024-06-07	Win	(France) Léa Fouchier	2024 IFMA Senior World Championship, Semifinals	Patras, Greece	Decision (30:27)	3	3:00
2024-06-06	Win	(Greece) Anastasia Sarafidou	2024 IFMA Senior World Championship, Quarterfinals	Patras, Greece	Decision (30:25)	3	3:00
2023-11-	Win	(Czech Republic) Sarka Melinova	2023 WAKO World Championship, Final	Albufeira, Portugal	Decision (Unanimous)	3	2:00
Wins the 2023 WAKO World Championship K-1 -65kg Gold medal.
2023-11-	Win	(Finland) Mari Hankilanoja	2023 WAKO World Championship, Semifinals	Albufeira, Portugal	Decision (Unanimous)	3	2:00
2023-11-	Win	(Turkey) Nagihan Karakus	2023 WAKO World Championship, Quarterfinals	Albufeira, Portugal	Decision (Unanimous)	3	2:00
2023-11-	Win	(Serbia) Milana Bjelogrlic	2023 WAKO World Championship, First Round	Albufeira, Portugal	Decision (Unanimous)	3	2:00
2023-10-30	Win	(Turkey) Bediha Sahin	2023 World Combat Games, Tournament Final	Riyadh, UAE	Walkover		
Wins the 2023 World Combat Games Muay Thai -63.5kg Gold medal.
2023-10-29	Win	(Turkey) Bediha Sahin	2023 World Combat Games, Tournament Semifinals	Riyadh, UAE	TKO	2	
2023-10-28	Win	(China) Zhang Ruohan	2023 World Combat Games, Tournament Quarterfinals	Riyadh, UAE	TKO	1	
2023-05-12	Win	(Turkey) Bediha Sahin	2023 IFMA Senior World Championship, Final	Bangkok, Thailand	TKO	1	
Wins the 2023 IFMA World Championship -63.5kg Gold medal.
2023-05-10	Win	(Poland) Sandra Bolkowska	2023 IFMA Senior World Championship, Final	Bangkok, Thailand	Decision (30:24)	3	3:00
2023-05-08	Win	(United Arab Emirates) Miryam Chalghomi	2023 IFMA Senior World Championship, Quarterfinals	Bangkok, Thailand	TKO	1	
2022-07-17	Win	(France) Nora Cornolle	2022 World Games, Tournament Final	Birmingham, United States	TKO	3	
Wins the 2022 World Games Muay Thai -63.5kg Gold medal.
2022-07-16	Win	(United States) Erin Clayton	2022 World Games, Tournament Semifinals	Birmingham, United States	Decision (30:27)	3	3:00
2019-07-28	Win	(United States) Angela Whitley	2019 IFMA Senior World Championship, Final	Bangkok, Thailand	Decision (30:27)	3	3:00
Wins the 2019 IFMA World Championship -63.5kg Gold medal.
2019-07-27	Win	(Sweden) Sara Matsson	2019 IFMA Senior World Championship, Semifinals	Bangkok, Thailand	TKO	3	
2019-07-25	Win	(Ukraine) Anita Khodieieva	2019 IFMA Senior World Championship, Quarterfinals	Bangkok, Thailand	TKO	2	
2019-05-02	Win	(Thailand) Janejira Wankrue	2019 Arafura Games, Tournament Final	Darwin, Australia	Decision (30:27)	3	3:00
Wins the 2019 Arafura Games Muay Thai -63.5kg medal.
2019-04-30	Win	(France) Nora Cornolle	2019 Arafura Games, Tournament Semifinals	Darwin, Australia	Decision (30:27)	3	3:00
2018-05-18	Loss	(Russia) Anastasiia Nepianidi	2018 IFMA Senior World Championship, Semifinals	Cancun, Mexico	Decision (30:27)	3	3:00
Wins the 2018 IFMA World Championship -67kg Silver medal.
2018-05-16	Win	(United States) Angela Whitley	2018 IFMA Senior World Championship, Semifinals	Cancun, Mexico	Decision (30:26)	3	3:00
2018-05-14	Win	(Finland) Riikka J	2018 IFMA Senior World Championship, Quarterfinals	Cancun, Mexico	TKO	3	
2016-08-31	Win	(Turkey) Sari Cansu	2016 IFMA Youth World Championship, Final	Bangkok, Thailand	Decision (30:27)	3	3:00
Wins the 2016 IFMA Youth World Championship (U-17) -67kg Gold medal.
Legend: Win Loss Draw/No contest Notes
