= Capitan Petchyindee Academy =

Thai Muay Thai fighter

Capitan
- Born: Anueng Khatthamarasri; March 24, 1993 (age 33); Nong Bua Lamphu Province, Thailand
- Other names: Diesellek Aoodonmuang (ดีเซลเล็ก อู๊ดดอนเมือง); Diesellek Phran 26; Diesellek Petchisirgym; Diesellek Pangkongprab
- Height: 169 cm (5 ft 6 1/2 in)
- Weight: 65 kg (143 lb; 10.2 st)
- Reach: 68 1/2 in (174 cm)
- Stance: Orthodox
- Fighting out of: Bangkok, Thailand
- Team: Petchyindee Academy (2019–present); Pangkongprab-Paeminburi (former); Petsiri (former)

Kickboxing record
- Total: 209
- Wins: 159
- Losses: 47
- Draws: 3

Medal record

Men's Muay Thai

Representing Thailand

IFMA World Championships
Gold medal – first place	2022 Abu Dhabi	67 kg
Gold medal – first place	2021 Bangkok	67 kg

World Games
Bronze medal – third place	2017 Wrocław	67 kg
Gold medal – first place	2022 Birmingham	67 kg

Southeast Asian Games
Gold medal – first place	2017 Kuala Lumpur	71 kg

Capitan Petchyindee Academy (Thai: กัปปิตัน เพชรยินดีอะคาเดมี; born March 24, 1993) is a Muay Thai fighter and kickboxer from Thailand. He used to be known by the ring name Diesellek Aoodonmuang. His given name is Anueng Khatthamarasri. He is a former ONE Bantamweight Kickboxing World Champion and former Lumpinee Stadium Super Welterweight champion.

As of December 2020 he is the number 7 pound-for-pound Muay Thai fighter in the world according to The Nation. According to Combat Press, he was the #5 ranked featherweight kickboxer in the world as of February 2021.

== Fighting career ==
Capitan was scheduled to defend his Lumpinee Stadium Super Welterweight title in January 2020 against Yodkhunpon Sitmonchai. Capitan won the fight by unanimous decision, and was also awarded 300,000 baht as a bonus. The two of them fought a rematch a month later, with Capitan once again winning a decision.

=== SEA Games ===
At the 29th SEA Games, he had a close match with Meun Sophea of Cambodia before winning the 71 kg gold medal.

=== One Championship ===
He signed a contract with ONE Championship in January 2020.

Capitan was scheduled to fight the former Enfusion and Wu Lin Feng champion Petchtanong Banchamek at ONE Championship: A New Breed 3. He set a ONE Super Series record by knocking Petchtanong out with the first punch of the fight, after just 6 seconds.

In October 2020, Capitan fought Chamuaktong Fightermuaythai in the Rangsit Stadium. He won the fight by decision.

Capitan is expected to face Sangmanee Sor Tienpo in a Petchyindee Promotions event on December 11, 2020. He won the fight, and the vacant True4U super lightweight title, by decision.

On January 22, 2021, Capitan defeated Alaverdi Ramazanov by KO via leg kicks for the ONE Bantamweight Kickboxing World Championship at ONE Championship: Unbreakable.

Capitan faced Nuenglanlek Jitmuangnon on March 26, 2021, in a True4U event. After a controversial final round, the bout ended in a draw. Subsequently, Capitan's manager insinuated that the fighter would be fighting exclusively in ONE Championship.

Capitan was next scheduled to defend his ONE Bantamweight Kickboxing World Championship against Mehdi Zatout at ONE Championship: Revolution on September 24, 2021. He won the fight by unanimous decision.

Capitan made his second title defense against Hiroki Akimoto at ONE: X on March 25, 2022. He lost the fight by unanimous decision, after losing the final four rounds of the bout. Capitan was twice warned for illegal clinching and was deducted a point for it in the fourth round.

Capitan faced Alaverdi Ramazanov at ONE 161 on September 29, 2022. He lost the close bout via split decision.

Due to a disagreement between his gym, Petchyindee Academy, and ONE Championship, all Petchyindee fighters were released from the promotion at the request of the gym.

== Championships and accomplishments ==
=== Muay Thai ===
Professional

- Professional Boxing Association of Thailand (PAT)
  - 2016 Thailand 154 lbs Champion
- Siam Omnoi Stadium
  - 2016 Isuzu Cup Runner-up
- World Professional Muaythai Federation (WPMF)
  - 2016 WPMF World Super Welterweight 154 lbs Champion
- Petchyindee True4U/PRYDE TV
  - 2019 True4U Middleweight (160 lbs) Champion
  - 2020 True4U Super Lightweight (140 lbs) Champion
  - 2025 PRYDE TV Welterweight (147 lbs) Champion
- Lumpinee Stadium
  - 2019 Lumpinee Stadium Super-welterweight (154 lbs) Champion (1 Defense)
- Rajadamnern Stadium
  - 2023 Rajadamnern World Series 140 lbs Winner

Amateur

- International Federation of Muaythai Associations
  - 2021 IFMA World Championships −67 kg (gold) & Most Outstanding Athlete Award
  - 2022 IFMA World Championships −67 kg (gold)
- World Games
  - 2017 IFMA Muay Thai at the World Games -67 kg (bronze)
  - 2022 IFMA Muay Thai at the World Games -67 kg (gold)
- Southeast Asian Games
  - 2017 Southeast Asian Games Muay Thai -71 kg (gold)
- World Combat Games
  - 2023 World Combat Games Muay Thai -67 kg (silver)

=== Kickboxing ===
- ONE Championship
  - 2021 ONE Bantamweight Kickboxing World Champion (1 Defense)
- Beyond Kickboxing
  - 2022 Beyond Kick "Fight of the Year" (vs. Hiroki Akimoto)

== Fight record ==
Muay Thai Record
159 Wins, 47 Losses, 3 Draws
Date	Result	Opponent	Event	Location	Method	Round	Time
2026-12-30		(Japan) Taiumu Hisai	KNOCK OUT.17 ～K.O CLIMAX 2026～	Tokyo, Japan			
2026-08-08	Loss	(Thailand) Dam Parunchai	Rajadamnern World Series, Rajadamnern Stadium	Bangkok, Thailand	Decision (Unanimous)	5	3:00
For the Rajadamnern Stadium Super Lightweight (140 lbs) title.
2026-03-28	Win	(Japan) Taiju Shiratori	RISE ELDORADO 2026	Tokyo, Japan	Tech. Decision (Majority)	4	0:28
2025-12-02	Draw	(Australia) Max McVicker	Amazing MuayThai Fight Night 2	Bangkok, Thailand	Decision (Split)	5	3:00
For the WBC Muay Thai Diamond Welterweight (147 lbs) title.
2025-09-25	Win	(Thailand) Nuenglanlek Jitmuangnon	Petchyindee, Rajadamnern Stadium	Bangkok, Thailand	Decision (Unanimous)	5	3:00
Wins the vacant PRYDE TV Welterweight (147 lbs) title.
2025-08-09	Win	(Thailand) Chujaroen Dabransarakarm	Yod Muay Isan Fight	Maha Sarakham province, Thailand	KO (Left hook)	2	
2025-06-21	Loss	(Iran) Sajad Sattari	Rajadamnern World Series	Bangkok, Thailand	Decision (Unanimous)	3	3:00
2025-04-19	Win	(United States) Chris Cocores	Rajadamnern World Series	Bangkok, Thailand	TKO (Elbows)	1	2:48
2025-02-12	Win	(Thailand) Kaonar P.K. Saenchai Muaythaigym	WMC Samui, Phetchbuncha Stadium	Koh Samui, Thailand	Decision	5	3:00
2024-10-12	Loss	(Thailand) Nuenglanlek Jitmuangnon	Rajadamnern World Series	Bangkok, Thailand	Decision (Unanimous)	5	3:00
For the interim Rajadamnern Stadium Welterweight (147 lbs) title.
2024-06-29	Win	(Thailand) Khunhanlek Singhamawynn	Rajadamnern World Series - Group Stage	Bangkok, Thailand	Decision (Unanimous)	3	3:00
2024-05-25	Win	(France) Alexis Laugeois	Rajadamnern World Series	Bangkok, Thailand	Decision (Unanimous)	3	3:00
2023-12-27	Loss	(Thailand) Tapaokaew Singmawynn	Rajadamnern Stadium 78th Birthday Show	Bangkok, Thailand	Decision	5	3:00
2023-09-30	Win	(Thailand) Nuenglanlek Jitmuangnon	Rajadamnern World Series - Final	Bangkok, Thailand	Decision (Unanimous)	5	3:00
Wins the 2023 Rajadamnern World Series Super Lightweight (140 lbs) title.
2023-08-19	Win	(Thailand) Chujaroen Dabransarakarm	Rajadamnern World Series - Final 4	Bangkok, Thailand	Decision (Unanimous)	3	3:00
2023-07-15	Win	(Turkey) Soner VenumMuayThai	Rajadamnern World Series - Group Stage	Bangkok, Thailand	Decision (Unanimous)	3	3:00
2023-06-10	Loss	(Thailand) Petchthongchai T.B.M Gym	Rajadamnern World Series - Group Stage	Bangkok, Thailand	Decision (Unanimous)	3	3:00
2023-05-06	Win	(Thailand) Sakulchailek Pangkongpap	Rajadamnern World Series - Group Stage	Bangkok, Thailand	Decision (Unanimous)	3	3:00
2023-04-11	Win	(Thailand) Chujaroen Dabransarakarm	Muaymansananmuang Mahasarakham	Maha Sarakham province, Thailand	Decision	5	3:00
2023-03-11	Win	(Thailand) Nuenglanlek Jitmuangnon	RWS + Petchyindee, Rajadamnern Stadium	Bangkok, Thailand	Decision (Unanimous)	3	3:00
2022-12-28	Win	(Thailand) Thaksinlek Kiatniwat	Muay Thai Rakya Soosakon + SAT Super Fight Withee Tin Thai + Petchyindee	Bangkok, Thailand	KO (Straight to the body)	3	1:18
2022-09-29	Loss	(Russia) Alaverdi Ramazanov	ONE 161	Kallang, Singapore	Decision (Split)	3	3:00
2022-03-25	Loss	(Japan) Hiroki Akimoto	ONE: X	Kallang, Singapore	Decision (Unanimous)	5	3:00
Lost the ONE Kickboxing Bantamweight title
2021-09-24	Win	(France) Mehdi Zatout	ONE Championship: Revolution	Singapore	Decision	5	3:00
Defends the ONE Kickboxing Bantamweight title
2021-03-26	Draw	(Thailand) Nuenglanlek Jitmuangnon	Muaymumwansuk True4u, Rangsit Stadium	Rangsit, Thailand	Decision	5	3:00
2021-01-22	Win	(Russia) Alaverdi Ramazanov	ONE Championship: Unbreakable	Kallang, Singapore	KO (Leg Kick + right cross)	2	1:56
Wins the ONE Kickboxing Bantamweight title
2020-12-11	Win	(Thailand) Sangmanee Sor.Cafemuaythai	Muaymumwansuk True4u, Rangsit Stadium	Rangsit, Thailand	Decision	5	3:00
Wins the vacant True4U 140lbs title
2020-10-02	Win	(Thailand) Chamuaktong Fightermuaythai	Muaymumwansuk True4u, Rangsit Stadium	Rangsit, Thailand	Decision	5	3:00
2020-09-18	Win	(Thailand) Petchtanong Banchamek	ONE Championship: A New Breed 3	Bangkok, Thailand	KO (Right cross)	1	0:06
2020-02-07	Win	(Thailand) Yodkhunpon Sitmonchai	Lumpinee Stadium	Bangkok, Thailand	Decision	5	3:00
2020-01-03	Win	(Thailand) Yodkhunpon Sitmonchai	Lumpinee Stadium	Bangkok, Thailand	Decision	5	3:00
Defends the Lumpinee Stadium Super-welterweight (154 lbs) title.
2019-11-22	Win	(Iran) Shahoo Gheisarian	Toyota Marathon	Chonburi Province, Thailand	Decision	5	3:00
Wins the True4U 160lbs title
2019-10-28	Win	(Iran) Mojtaba Taravati	Muay Thai Super Champ	Bangkok, Thailand	Decision	3	3:00
2019-09-06	Win	(China) Meng Qinghao	Wu Lin Feng 2019: WLF at Lumpinee – China vs Thailand	Bangkok, Thailand	Decision	3	3:00
2019-08-18	Win	(Cambodia) Sophea Meun	Muay Thai Super Champ	Bangkok, Thailand	TKO (Punches)	2	
2019-06-01	Win	(Thailand) Dechrid Sathian Muaythai Gym	Lumpinee Stadium	Bangkok, Thailand	Decision	5	3:00
Wins vacant Lumpinee Stadium Super-welterweight (154 lbs) title.
2019-04-21	Win	(Italy) Luca Lombardo	Muay Thai Super Champ	Bangkok, Thailand	Decision	3	3:00
2019-03-17	Win	(Iran) Keivan Soleimani	Muay Thai Super Champ	Bangkok, Thailand	Decision	3	3:00
2018-12-16	Win	(Cambodia) Roeung Sophorn	SeaTV Khmer Boxing	Cambodia	Decision	5	3:00
2018-03-17	Loss	(Thailand) Yodkhunpon Sitmonchai	Topking World Series 18, Semi Final	Thailand	Decision	3	3:00
2017-12-15	Win	(Poland) Patryk Beszta	MX Muay Xtreme	Thailand	Decision	5	3:00
2017-02-06	Win	(Armenia) Yurik Davtyan	Nimbutr Stadium – Muaythai Day, Final	Bangkok, Thailand	Decision	3	3:00
2016-12-17	Loss	(Thailand) Saensatharn P.K. Saenchai Muaythaigym	Omnoi Stadium	Bangkok, Thailand	Decision	5	3:00
2016-10-30	Draw	(Cambodia) Long Sovandoeun	PNN Sports	Phnom Penh, Cambodia	Decision	5	3:00
2016-09-10	Win	(Thailand) Talaytong Sor.Thanaphet	Lumpinee Stadium	Bangkok, Thailand	KO	4	
2016-07-26	Win	(Thailand) Dechrid Sathian Muaythai Gym	Prince's Birthday	Bangkok, Thailand	Decision	5	3:00
Wins WPMF World and Thailand 154 lbs title.
2016-07-03	Win	(Thailand) Kwanchai Petchniroth	Rangsit Stadium	Thailand	Decision	5	3:00
2016-05-22	Win	(Thailand) Sang-Uthai Sor.Jor.Piek-Uthai	Channel 7 Stadium	Bangkok, Thailand	KO	3	
2016-02-27	Loss	(Thailand) Por.Tor.Thor. Petchrungruang	Omnoi Stadium – Isuzu Cup Final	Samut Sakhon, Thailand	Decision	5	3:00
For the Isuzu Cup 154 lbs title.
2015-12-26	Win	(Thailand) Yodkhunpon Sitmonchai	Omnoi Stadium – Isuzu Cup	Bangkok, Thailand	Decision	5	3:00
2015-09-12	Loss	(Thailand) Por.Tor.Thor. Petchrungruang	Omnoi Stadium	Samut Sakhon, Thailand	Decision	5	3:00
2015-08-15	Win	(Thailand) Auisiewpor Sujibamikiew	Omnoi Stadium	Bangkok, Thailand	Decision	5	3:00
2015-06-03	Win	(Thailand) Khunsuk Sit KamnanPrasert		Maha Sarakham, Thailand	Decision	5	3:00
2015-05-08	Win	(Thailand) Kwanchai SomsakKorsang		Maha Sarakham, Thailand	KO	4	
2015-02-16	Win	(Thailand) Koban Suranareegym		Thailand	Decision	5	3:00
2014-11-30	Loss	(Thailand) Manasak Sor.Jor.Lekmuangnon	Rajadamnern Stadium	Bangkok, Thailand	Decision	5	3:00
2014-10-06	Win	(Thailand) Nopakrit Kor.Kumpanart	Rajadamnern Stadium	Bangkok, Thailand	Decision	5	3:00
2014-08-27	Loss	(Thailand) Kwanchai Petchnirot		Nakhon Ratchasima, Thailand	Decision	5	3:00
2013-11-15	Win	(Thailand) Phetasawin Seatranferry	Lumpinee Stadium	Bangkok, Thailand	KO (Punches)	4	
2013-06-29	Loss	(France) Fabio Pinca	MAX Muay Thai 2, Semi Finals	Pattaya, Thailand	Decision	3	3:00
2013-05-31	Win	(Thailand) Chok Sagami	Lumpinee Stadium	Bangkok, Thailand	Decision	5	3:00
2013-04-05	Win	(Thailand) Pakorn PKSaenchaimuaythaigym	Lumpinee Stadium	Bangkok, Thailand	Decision	5	3:00
2013-01-26	Loss	(Thailand) Saenchai	Yokkao Extreme 2013	Milan, Italy	Decision (unanimous)	5	3:00
2012-12-07	Loss	(Thailand) Petchboonchu FA Group	Lumpinee Stadium	Bangkok, Thailand	Decision	5	3:00
For the Thailand 135 lbs title.
2012-10-12	Win	(France) Damien Alamos	Lumpinee Stadium	Bangkok, Thailand	Decision	5	3:00
2012-09-07	Win	(Thailand) F-16 Rachanon	Lumpinee Stadium	Bangkok, Thailand	TKO	5	
2012-07-31	Win	(Thailand) F-16 Rachanon	Lumpinee Stadium	Bangkok, Thailand	KO (High Kick)	3	
2012-06-17	Win	(Thailand) Nopakrit Kor.Kampanat	Channel 7 Stadium	Bangkok, Thailand	Decision	5	3:00
2012-05-15	Win	(Thailand) Nopakrit Kor.Kampanat	Kiatpetch, Lumpinee Stadium	Bangkok, Thailand	Decision	5	3:00
2012-03-03	Win	(Thailand) Aphisak K.T. Gym	Muay Dee Withee Thai, Ladprao Stadium	Thailand	Decision	5	3:00
2011-09-23	Loss	(France) Damien Alamos	Kiatphet, Lumpinee Stadium	Bangkok, Thailand	Decision	5	3:00
For the WPMF World −63.5kg title.
2011-06-22	Win	(Thailand) Dung Kiatrenchai	Pattaya Stadium	Pattaya, Thailand	TKO	4	
Legend: Win Loss Draw/No contest Notes

Amateur Muay Thai Record
Date	Result	Opponent	Event	Location	Method	Round	Time
2023-10-30	Loss	(Morocco) Rachid Hamza	2023 World Combat Games, Grand Final	Riyadh, Saudi Arabia	Doctor stop/eye injury		
Wins the 2023 World Combat Games Muay Thai −67kg Silver Medal.
2023-10-29	Win	(United Arab Emirates) Mohammad Mardi	2023 World Combat Games, Winner bracket Semifinals	Riyadh, Saudi Arabia	Decision (30:27)	3	3:00
2023-10-28	Win	(Morocco) Rachid Hamza	2023 World Combat Games, Quarterfinals	Riyadh, Saudi Arabia	Decision (29:28)	3	3:00
2022-07-17	Win	(Morocco) Rachid Hamza	IFMA at the 2022 World Games, Final	Birmingham, Alabama, United States	Decision (30:27)	3	3:00
Wins 2022 World Games Muay Thai −67kg Gold Medal.
2022-07-16	Win	(Hungary) Spéth Norbert Attila	IFMA at the 2022 World Games, Semi Finals	Birmingham, Alabama, United States	Decision (30:27)	3	3:00
2022-07-15	Win	(Greece) Dimos Asimakopoulos	IFMA at the 2022 World Games, Quarter Finals	Birmingham, Alabama, United States	Decision (30:27)	3	3:00
2022-06-04	Win	(Kazakhstan) Zhanibek Kanatbayev	IFMA Senior World Championships 2022, Final	Abu Dhabi, United Arab Emirates	KO (Body shot)	2	
Wins 2022 IFMA World Championships −67kg Gold Medal.
2022-06-02	Win	(Poland) Oskar Siegert	IFMA Senior World Championships 2022, Semi Finals	Abu Dhabi, United Arab Emirates	Decision	3	3:00
2022-05-31	Win	(Australia) Benjamin Cant	IFMA Senior World Championships 2022, Quarter Finals	Abu Dhabi, United Arab Emirates	Decision (Unanimous)	3	3:00
2022-05-28	Win	(Sweden) Kenny Hong	IFMA Senior World Championships 2022, Second Round	Abu Dhabi, United Arab Emirates	Decision (Unanimous)	3	3:00
2021-12-11	Win	(Hungary) Spéth Norbert Attila	2021 IFMA World Championships, Final	Bangkok, Thailand	Decision (Unanimous)	3	
Wins 2021 IFMA World Championships −67kg Gold Medal.
2021-12-10	Win	(Belarus) Dmitry Varats	2021 IFMA World Championships, Semi Finals	Bangkok, Thailand	Decision (Split)	3	3:00
2021-12-09	Win	(Poland) Oskar Siegert	2021 IFMA World Championships, Quarter Finals	Bangkok, Thailand	Decision (Unanimous)	3	3:00
2021-12-08	Win	(Turkey) Erdem Dincer	2021 IFMA World Championships, Second Round	Bangkok, Thailand	Decision (Unanimous)	3	3:00
2021-12-06	Win	(Malaysia) Mohammed Bin Mahmoud	2021 IFMA World Championships, First Round	Bangkok, Thailand	TKO (Low Kicks)	1	
2017-09-21	Win	(China) Guo Dongwang	2017 Asian Indoor and Martial Arts Games, Final	Ashgabat, Turkmenistan	Decision (29:28)	3	3:00
Wins 2017 Asian Indoor and Martial Arts Games Muay Thai -71kg Gold Medal.
2017-09-20	Win	(Vietnam) Nguyễn Thanh Tùng	2017 Asian Indoor and Martial Arts Games, Semifinals	Ashgabat, Turkmenistan	TKO		
2017-09-19	Win	(Iran) Kaveh Soleimani	2017 Asian Indoor and Martial Arts Games, Quarterfinals	Ashgabat, Turkmenistan	Decision (30:26)	3	3:00
2017-09-18	Win	(Lebanon) Eddy Tuuhia	2017 Asian Indoor and Martial Arts Games, First Round	Ashgabat, Turkmenistan	Decision (30:26)	3	3:00
2017-08-29	Win	(Cambodia) Meun Sophea	2017 Southeast Asian Games, Final	Kuala Lumpur, Malaysia	Decision	3	3:00
Wins 2017 SEA Games Muay Thai -71kg Gold Medal.
2017-08-28	Win	(Vietnam) Trương Quốc Hưng	2017 Southeast Asian Games, Semi Finals	Kuala Lumpur, Malaysia	Decision	3	3:00
2017-07-29	Loss	(Ukraine) Sergey Kulyaba	I.F.M.A. World Muaythai at The World Games 2017, Semi Finals	Wroclaw, Poland	Decision (29:28)	3	3:00
Wins the I.F.M.A. World Muaythai at the World Games -67kg Bronze Medal.
2017-07-28	Win	(Belarus) Pavel Hryshanovich	I.F.M.A. World Muaythai at The World Games 2017, Quarter Finals	Wroclaw, Poland	RSC	1	
Legend: Win Loss Draw/No contest Notes

== See also ==
- List of male kickboxers
- List of multi-sport athletes
- List of multi-sport champions
