= Portugal at the 2022 World Games =

- IOC code: POR
- NOC: Olympic Committee of Portugal

in Birmingham, United States 7 July 2022 – 17 July 2022
- Competitors: 47 (20 men and 27 women) in 10 sports
- Medals Ranked 36th: Gold 1 Silver 3 Bronze 1 Total 5

World Games appearances
- 1981; 1985; 1989; 1993; 1997; 2001; 2005; 2009; 2013; 2017; 2022; 2025

Portugal competed at the 2022 World Games held in Birmingham, United States from 7 to 17 July 2022. Athletes representing Portugal won one gold medal, three silver medals and one bronze medal. The country finished in 36th place in the medal table.

== Medalists ==
Medal	Name	Sport	Event	Date
Gold	Ana Luísa Walgode; Pedro Walgode	Artistic roller skating	Couple dance	17 July
Silver	Rita Teixeira; Rita Ferreira	Acrobatic gymnastics	Women's pair	15 July
Silver	Francisca Maia; Beatriz Carneiro; Barbara Sequeira	Acrobatic gymnastics	Women's group	16 July
Silver	Diogo Calado	Muaythai	Men's 81 kg	17 July
Bronze	José Ramalho	Canoe marathon	Men's short distance	11 July

== Competitors ==
The following is the list of number of competitors in the Games.

Sport	Men	Women	Total
Acrobatic gymnastics	3	6	9
Aerobic gymnastics	0	8	8
Artistic roller skating	2	1	3
Canoe marathon	1	1	2
Kickboxing	1	1	2
Korfball	7	7	14
Muaythai	3	1	4
Road speed skating Track speed skating	1	0	1
Trampoline gymnastics	2	2	4
Total	20	27	47

== Acrobatic gymnastics ==
Portugal won two medals in acrobatic gymnastics.

== Aerobic gymnastics ==
Portugal competed in aerobic gymnastics.

== Artistic roller skating ==
Portugal won one gold medal in artistic roller skating.

== Canoe marathon ==
Portugal won one medal in canoe marathon.

== Kickboxing ==
Portugal competed in kickboxing.

Men

Athlete	Category	Quarterfinals	Semifinals	Final/Bronze medal bout	
Athlete	Category	Opposition Result	Opposition Result	Opposition Result	Rank
Tiago Santos	Men's 63.5 kg	Tlemissov (KAZ); L 1–2	did not advance		

Women

Athlete	Event	Quarterfinals	Semifinals	Final/Bronze medal bout	
Athlete	Event	Opposition Score	Opposition Score	Opposition Score	Rank
Sofia Oliveira	Women's 60 kg	Connart (BEL); L 1–2	did not advance		

== Korfball ==
Portugal competed in korfball.

== Muaythai ==
Portugal won one silver medal in muaythai.

== Road speed skating ==
Portugal competed in road speed skating.

== Track speed skating ==
Portugal competed in track speed skating.

== Trampoline gymnastics ==
Portugal competed in trampoline gymnastics.
