= United Arab Emirates at the 2022 World Games =

- IOC code: UAE
- NOC: United Arab Emirates National Olympic Committee

in Birmingham, United States 7 July 2022 – 17 July 2022
- Competitors: 13 (10 men and 3 women) in 4 sports
- Medals Ranked 28th: Gold 2 Silver 1 Bronze 5 Total 8

World Games appearances
- 1981; 1985; 1989; 1993; 1997; 2001; 2005; 2009; 2013; 2017; 2022

The United Arab Emirates competed at the 2022 World Games held in Birmingham, United States from 7 to 17 July 2022. Athletes representing the United Arab Emirates won two gold medals, one silver medal and five bronze medals. The country finished in 28th place in the medal table.

== Medalists ==
Medal	Name	Sport	Event	Date
Gold	Faisal Al-Ketbi	Ju-jitsu	Men's ne-waza 85 kg	15 July
Gold	Faisal Al-Ketbi	Ju-jitsu	Men's ne-waza open	16 July
Silver	Mohamed Al-Suwaidi	Ju-jitsu	Men's ne-waza 69 kg	15 July
Bronze	Abdulbari Al-Qubaisi	Air sports	Canopy piloting	12 July
Bronze	Shamma Al-Kalbani	Ju-jitsu	Women's ne-waza 63 kg	15 July
Bronze	Shamma Al-Kalbani	Ju-jitsu	Women's ne-waza open	16 July
Bronze	Nouredine Samir	Muaythai	Men's 63.5 kg	17 July
Bronze	Ilyass Hbibali	Muaythai	Men's 81 kg	17 July

== Competitors ==
The following is the list of number of competitors in the Games.

Sport	Men	Women	Total
Air sports	1	1	2
Duathlon	2	0	2
Ju-jitsu	3	2	5
Muaythai	4	0	4
Total	10	3	13

== Air sports ==
United Arab Emirates won one bronze medal in air sports.

== Duathlon ==
United Arab Emirates competed in duathlon.

== Ju-jitsu ==
United Arab Emirates won five medals in ju-jitsu.

== Muaythai ==
United Arab Emirates won two bronze medals in muaythai.
