= Thailand at the 2022 World Games =

- IOC code: THA
- NOC: National Olympic Committee of Thailand
- Website: www.olympicthai.org (in Thai and English)

in Birmingham, United States
- Competitors: 32 (21 men and 11 women) in 9 sports
- Medals Ranked 18th: Gold 4 Silver 3 Bronze 2 Total 9

World Games appearances (overview)
- 1981; 1985; 1989; 1993; 1997; 2001; 2005; 2009; 2013; 2017; 2022

Thailand competed in the 2022 World Games in Birmingham, United States from 7 to 17 July 2022. The games were originally scheduled for July 2021, but were postponed due to the rescheduling of the Tokyo 2020 Olympic Games. Athletes representing Thailand won four gold medals, three silver medals and two bronze medals. The country finished in 18th place in the medal table.

== Medalists ==
Medal	Name	Sport	Event	Date
Gold	Kanjutha Phattaraboonsorn	Ju-jitsu	Women's fighting 48 kg	15 July
Gold	Lalita Yuennan; Warawut Saengsriruang	Ju-jitsu	Mixed duo	16 July
Gold	Anueng Khatthamarasri	Muaythai	Men's 67 kg	17 July
Gold	Thanet Nitutorn	Muaythai	Men's 71 kg	17 July
Silver	Orapa Senatham	Ju-jitsu	Women's fighting 63 kg	15 July
Silver	Kanjutha Phattaraboonsorn	Ju-jitsu	Women's ne-waza 48 kg	15 July
Silver	Weerasak Tharakhajad	Muaythai	Men's 63.5 kg	17 July
Bronze	Phantipha Wongchuvej	Boules sports	Women's Petanque Precision Shooting	12 July
Bronze	Nantawan Fueangsanit; Phantipha Wongchuvej	Boules sports	Women's Petanque Doubles	13 July

== Competitors ==
The following is the list of number of competitors in the Games.

Sport	Men	Women	Total
Air sports	0	1	1
Billiards sports	1	0	1
Boules sports	0	2	2
Floorball	14	0	14
Ju-jitsu	1	4	5
Muaythai	3	2	5
Sumo	0	2	2
Water skiing	1	0	1
Wushu	1	0	1
Total	21	11	32

== Air sports ==
Thailand qualified one pilot in drone racing at the World Games, as a result of the FAI The World Games 2022 Women Selection List.

Athlete	Event	Classification		1/32 Finals		Round 2		Semifinals		Finals	
Athlete	Event	Result	Rank	Result	Rank	Result	Rank	Result	Rank	Result	Rank
Wanraya Wannapong	Drone racing	24.006997	11 Q	1:14.174464	2 Q	Did not start					

== Billiards sports ==
Thailand qualified one snooker player in men's singles snooker at the World Games by finishing as runner-up at the 2022 IBSF World Under-21 Snooker Championships in Doha, Qatar.

Athlete	Event	Round of 16	Quarterfinals	Semifinals	Final / BM	
Athlete	Event	Opposition Result	Opposition Result	Opposition Result	Opposition Result	Rank
Taweesap Kongkitchertchoo	Men's singles snooker	(Qatar) Ali Alobaidli; L 0–3	did not advance			

== Boules sports ==
Thailand qualified two pétanque players in women's pétanque doubles at the World Games. Phantipha Wongchuvej and Nantawan Fueangsanit receive one spot in women's doubles by finishing in the first place at the 2019 FIPJP Women's Doubles Pétanque World Championships in Almería, Spain. Phantipha Wongchuvej also qualified in women's pétanque precision shooting.

Pétanque classic

Athlete	Event	Group matches			Semifinals	Final / BM	
Athlete	Event	Opposition Result	Opposition Result	Rank	Opposition Result	Opposition Result	Rank
Nantawan Fueangsanit; Phantipha Wongchuvej	Women's doubles	(United States); W 15–3	(Germany); W 13–0	1 Q	(Cambodia); L 12–10	(Germany); W 13–0	3rd place, bronze medalist(s)

Pétanque precision shooting

Athlete	Event	Qualification		Semifinals	Final / BM	
Athlete	Event	Result	Rank	Opposition Result	Opposition Result	Rank
Phantipha Wongchuvej	Women's precision shooting	47	5 Q	(United States) Rebeka Howe; L 37–38	(Denmark) Katrine Junge; W 34–20	3rd place, bronze medalist(s)

== Floorball ==
Thailand men's floorball team qualified for the World Games by securing an outright berth as the highest-ranked team from Asia and Oceania at the 2020 IFF Men's World Floorball Championships in Helsinki, Finland.

Summary

Team	Event	Group stage				Semifinal	Final / BM / Pl.	
Team	Event	Opposition Score	Opposition Score	Opposition Score	Rank	Opposition Score	Opposition Score	Rank
Thailand men's	Men's tournament	Switzerland; L 3–10	Sweden; L 1–20	Latvia; L 2–15	4	Did not advance	United States; W 7–3	7

Group play

Pos	Team	Pld	W	D	L	GF	GA	GD	Pts	Qualification
1	Sweden	3	2	1	0	29	7	+22	5	Semifinals
2	Latvia	3	2	1	0	27	13	+14	5	Semifinals
3	Switzerland	3	1	0	2	15	12	+3	2	Fifth place game
4	Thailand	3	0	0	3	6	45	−39	0	Seventh place game

Source: IFF

8 July 2022; 15:30	Switzerland	10–3 (4–0, 2–2, 4–1)	Thailand	BJCC East Exhibition Hall, Birmingham; Attendance: 247

IFF

9 July 2022; 09:30	Thailand	1–20 (0–6, 1–6, 0–8)	Sweden	BJCC East Exhibition Hall, Birmingham; Attendance: 259

IFF

10 July 2022; 09:30	Thailand	2–15 (1–5, 1–3, 0–7)	Latvia	BJCC East Exhibition Hall, Birmingham; Attendance: 156

IFF

Seventh place game

11 July 2022; 15:00	United States	3–7 (2–5, 1–1, 0–1)	Thailand	BJCC East Exhibition Hall, Birmingham; Attendance: 163

IFF

== Ju-jitsu ==
Thailand qualified five (one male and four female) ju-jitsu practitioners into the World Games, as a result of the JIIF The World Games 2022 Qualification Rankings.

Duo

Athlete	Event	Pool matches			Semifinals	Final / BM	
Athlete	Event	Opposition Result	Opposition Result	Rank	Opposition Result	Opposition Result	Rank
Lalita Yuennan; Warawut Saengsriruang	Mixed duo						

Fighting

Athlete	Event	Pool matches			Semifinals	Final / BM	
Athlete	Event	Opposition Result	Opposition Result	Rank	Opposition Result	Opposition Result	Rank
Kanjutha Phattaraboonsorn	Women's 48 kg						
Nuchanat Singchalad	Women's 57 kg						
Orapa Senatham	Women's 63 kg						

Ne-waza

Athlete	Event	Pool matches			Semifinals	Final / BM	
Athlete	Event	Opposition Result	Opposition Result	Rank	Opposition Result	Opposition Result	Rank
Kanjutha Phattaraboonsorn	Women's 48 kg						
Orapa Senatham	Women's 63 kg						

== Muaythai ==
Thailand competed in muaythai.

== Sumo ==
Thailand competed in sumo.

=== Middleweight ===
Main rounds

Athlete	Event	1/64 finals	1/32 finals	1/16 finals	Quarterfinals	Semifinals	Final	
Athlete	Event	1/64 finals	1/32 finals	1/16 finals	Quarterfinals	Semifinals	Opposition	Rank
Kamonchanok Amnuaypol	Women's middleweight	Daniela (GER); W	Sakura (JPN); L	did not advance				

Repechages

Athlete	Event	1/64 finals	1/32 finals	1/16 finals	Quarterfinals	Semifinals	Bronze medal final	
Athlete	Event	1/64 finals	1/32 finals	1/16 finals	Quarterfinals	Semifinals	Opposition	Rank
Kamonchanok Amnuaypol	Women's middleweight	—		Helen (USA); W	Monika (POL); L	did not advance		

=== Openweight ===
Main rounds

Athlete	Event	1/64 finals	1/32 finals	1/16 finals	Quarterfinals	Semifinals	Final	
Athlete	Event	1/64 finals	1/32 finals	1/16 finals	Quarterfinals	Semifinals	Opposition	Rank
Viparat Vituteerasan	Women's openweight	Armstrong (USA); L	did not advance					

Repechages

Athlete	Event	1/64 finals	1/32 finals	1/16 finals	Quarterfinals	Semifinals	Bronze medal final	
Athlete	Event	1/64 finals	1/32 finals	1/16 finals	Quarterfinals	Semifinals	Opposition	Rank
Viparat Vituteerasan	Women's openweight	—		Hiyori (JPN); W	Esmeraldo (VEN); L	did not advance		

== Water skiing ==
Thailand competed in water skiing.

== Wushu ==
Thailand competed in wushu.
