= Morocco at the 2022 World Games =

- IOC code: MAR
- NOC: Moroccan Olympic Committee

in Birmingham, United States 7 July 2022 – 17 July 2022
- Competitors: 10 (7 men and 3 women) in 6 sports
- Medals Ranked 52nd: Gold 0 Silver 4 Bronze 0 Total 4

World Games appearances
- 1981; 1985; 1989; 1993; 1997; 2001; 2005; 2009; 2013; 2017; 2022

Morocco competed at the 2022 World Games held in Birmingham, United States from 7 to 17 July 2022. Athletes representing Morocco won four silver medals. The country finished in 52nd place in the medal table.

== Medalists ==
Medal	Name	Sport	Event	Date
Silver	Nabil Ech-chaabi	Karate	Men's kumite 84 kg	9 July
Silver	Seif-Eddine Houmine	Ju-jitsu	Men's ne-waza open	16 July
Silver	Hamza Rachid	Muaythai	Men's 67 kg	17 July
Silver	Meriem El Moubarik	Muaythai	Women's 51 kg	17 July

== Competitors ==
The following is the list of number of competitors in the Games.

Sport	Men	Women	Total
Boules sports	0	1	1
Duathlon	1	0	1
Ju-jitsu	1	0	1
Karate	2	0	2
Muaythai	2	2	4
Water skiing	1	0	1
Total	7	3	10

== Boules sports ==
Morocco competed in boules sports.

== Duathlon ==
Morocco competed in duathlon.

== Ju-jitsu ==
Morocco won one silver medal in ju-jitsu.

== Karate ==
Morocco won one silver medal in karate.

Men

Athlete	Event	Elimination round				Semifinal	Final / BM	
Athlete	Event	Opposition Result	Opposition Result	Opposition Result	Rank	Opposition Result	Opposition Result	Rank
Abdelali Jina	Men's kumite 60 kg	Brose (BRA); L 0–6	Kalniņš (LAT); W 5–3	Shaaban (KUW); L 0–2	3	Did not advance		5
Nabil Ech-chaabi	Men's kumite 84 kg	—	Timmermans (NED); W 3–2	Badawy (EGY); L 0–5	2 Q	Madani (USA); W 5–2	Badawy (EGY); L 6–6	2nd place, silver medalist(s)

== Muaythai ==
Morocco won two silver medals in muaythai.

== Water skiing ==
Kamil Belmrah was registered to compete in water skiing; he did not start in his event.
