= France at the 2022 World Games =

- IOC code: FRA
- NOC: French Olympic Committee

in Birmingham, United States 7 July 2022 – 17 July 2022
- Competitors: 167 (90 men and 77 women) in 26 sports
- Flag bearer: Alizée Agier
- Medals Ranked 5th: Gold 11 Silver 15 Bronze 16 Total 42

World Games appearances
- 1981; 1985; 1989; 1993; 1997; 2001; 2005; 2009; 2013; 2017; 2022; 2025

France competed at the 2022 World Games held in Birmingham, United States from 7 to 17 July 2022. Athletes representing France won 11 gold medals, 15 silver medals and 16 bronze medals. The country finished in 5th place in the medal table.

== Medalists ==
Medal	Name	Sport	Event	Date
Gold	Killian Rousseau	Air sports	Drone racing	10 July
Gold	Magali Rousseau	Lifesaving	Women's 200 m super lifesaver	10 July
Gold	Cédric Veiga Rios	Air sports	Canopy piloting	12 July
Gold	Ophélie Armanet	Boules sports	Women's lyonnaise progressive shooting	12 July
Gold	Juliana Ferreira	Ju-jitsu	Women's fighting 63 kg	15 July
Gold	Mixed team	Ju-jitsu	Mixed national team competition	16 July
Gold	Candy Brière-Vetillard	Trampoline gymnastics	Women's tumbling	16 July
Gold	Victor Crouin	Squash	Men's singles	17 July
Gold	Women's team	Canoe polo	Women's tournament	17 July
Silver	Martin Ferrié	Track speed skating	Men's 10,000 m point elimination race	8 July
Silver	Marine Lefeuvre	Track speed skating	Women's 10,000 m point elimination race	8 July
Silver	Jean-Philippe Boulch	Archery	Men's compound individual	9 July
Silver	Kevin Lasserre	Lifesaving	Men's 200 m super lifesaver	10 July
Silver	Yvan Sivilier	Road speed skating	Men's 1 lap	11 July
Silver	Mathilde Pédronno	Road speed skating	Women's 1 lap	11 July
Silver	Martin Ferrié	Road speed skating	Men's 15,000 m elimination race	11 July
Silver	Ava Prêtre; Magali Rousseau; Leslie Belkacemi; Ludivine Blanc	Lifesaving	Women's 4 × 25 m manikin carry relay	11 July
Silver	Nadège Baussian; Caroline Bourriaud	Boules sports	Women's petanque doubles	13 July
Silver	Chloé Lalande	Ju-jitsu	Women's fighting 70 kg	15 July
Silver	Grégoire Marche	Squash	Men's singles	17 July
Silver	Axel Duriez	Trampoline gymnastics	Men's tumbling	17 July
Silver	Nora Cornolle	Muaythai	Women's 63.5 kg	17 July
Silver	Men's team	Canoe polo	Men's tournament	17 July
Bronze	Elena Salikhova; Charles-Guillaume Schmitt	Dancesport	Latin	8 July
Bronze	Hassan El-Belghiti	Powerlifting	Men's lightweight	8 July
Bronze	Yvan Sivilier	Track speed skating	Men's 200 m time trial	8 July
Bronze	Alizée Agier	Karate	Women's kumite 68 kg	9 July
Bronze	Marine Lefeuvre	Road speed skating	Women's 10,000 m point race	10 July
Bronze	Justine Weyders	Lifesaving	Women's 100 m manikin tow fins	11 July
Bronze	Marine Lefeuvre	Road speed skating	Women's 15,000 m elimination race	11 July
Bronze	Enzo Renou; Théo Faucherand; Baptiste Bouchut; Karl Gabillet; Joan Kerkhove; Sébastien Pasquier; Louis Allo; Damien Lafourcade; Valentin Gonzalez; Elliot Machy; Benoît Ladonne; Maxime Langlois; Lambert Hamon; Théo Fontanille	Inline hockey	Men's tournament	12 July
Bronze	Pierre Ballon	Water skiing	Men's tricks	15 July
Bronze	Sandra Badie	Ju-jitsu	Women's fighting 48 kg	15 July
Bronze	Laurence Cousin	Ju-jitsu	Women's ne-waza 57 kg	15 July
Bronze	Mejdi Schalck	Sport climbing	Men's lead	16 July
Bronze	Maxime Roux	Water skiing	Men's wakeboard	16 July
Bronze	Coline Aumard	Squash	Women's singles	17 July

=== Invitational sports ===
Medal	Name	Sport	Event	Date
Gold	Maxime Hueber-Moosbrugger	Duathlon	Men's individual	16 July
Gold	Maxime Hueber-Moosbrugger; Marion Legrand	Duathlon	Mixed team relay	17 July
Silver	Benjamin Choquert	Duathlon	Men's individual	16 July
Bronze	Loan Drouard	Wushu	Men's daoshu & gunshu	12 July
Bronze	Nathan Guerbeur; Garance Blaut	Duathlon	Mixed team relay	17 July

== Competitors ==
The following is the list of number of competitors in the Games.

Sport	Men	Women	Total
Aerobic gymnastics	0	3	3
Air sports	6	0	6
Archery	4	2	6
Artistic roller skating	0	1	1
Boules sports	0	5	5
Bowling	2	2	4
Canoe marathon	1	1	2
Canoe polo	8	8	16
Dancesport	3	3	6
Duathlon	3	2	5
Finswimming	2	5	7
Flag football	12	12	24
Flying disc	7	7	14
Inline hockey	14	0	14
Ju-jitsu	3	4	7
Karate	1	1	2
Lifesaving	7	6	13
Muaythai	1	3	4
Powerlifting	3	2	5
Road speed skating Track speed skating	2	2	4
Sport climbing	3	4	7
Squash	3	2	5
Trampoline gymnastics	1	1	2
Water skiing	2	0	2
Wushu	2	1	3
Total	90	77	167

== Aerobic gymnastics ==
France competed in aerobic gymnastics.

== Air sports ==
France won two gold medals in air sports.

== Archery ==
France won one silver medal in archery.

== Artistic roller skating ==
France competed in artistic roller skating.

== Boules sports ==
France won two medals in boules sports.

== Bowling ==
France competed in bowling.

== Canoe marathon ==
France competed in canoe marathon.

== Canoe polo ==
France won two medals in canoe polo.

== Dancesport ==
France won one bronze medal in dancesport.

== Duathlon ==
France won four medals in duathlon.

== Finswimming ==
France competed in finswimming.

== Flag football ==
France competed in flag football.

== Flying disc ==
France competed in the flying disc competition.

== Inline hockey ==
France won the bronze medal in the inline hockey tournament.

== Ju-jitsu ==
France won five medals in ju-jitsu.

== Karate ==
France won one bronze medal in karate.

Men

Athlete	Event	Elimination round				Semifinal	Final / BM	
Athlete	Event	Opposition Result	Opposition Result	Opposition Result	Rank	Opposition Result	Opposition Result	Rank
Jessie Da Costa	Men's kumite 84 kg	Huaiquimán (CHI); W 2–2	Kvesić (CRO); L 6–8	Madani (USA); L 2–4	3	Did not advance		5

Women

Athlete	Event	Elimination round				Semifinal	Final / BM	
Athlete	Event	Opposition Result	Opposition Result	Opposition Result	Rank	Opposition Result	Opposition Result	Rank
Alizée Agier	Women's kumite 68 kg	Melnyk (UKR); D 3–3	Quirici (SUI); W 3–0	Zaretska (AZE); W 7–4	1 Q	Zaretska (AUT); L 0–1	Zaretska (AZE); W 8–4	3rd place, bronze medalist(s)

== Lifesaving ==
France won four medals in lifesaving.

== Muaythai ==
France won one silver medal in muaythai.

== Powerlifting ==
France won one bronze medal in powerlifting.

== Road speed skating ==
France won five medals in road speed skating.

== Sport climbing ==
France won one bronze medal in sport climbing.

== Squash ==
France won three medals in squash.

== Track speed skating ==
France won three medals in track speed skating.

== Trampoline gymnastics ==
France won two medals in trampoline gymnastics.

== Water skiing ==
France won two bronze medals in water skiing.

== Wushu ==
France won one bronze medal in wushu.
