= Boutwell Memorial Auditorium =

Multi-purpose arena in Alabama, United States

Coordinates: 33.521590°N 86.811010°W

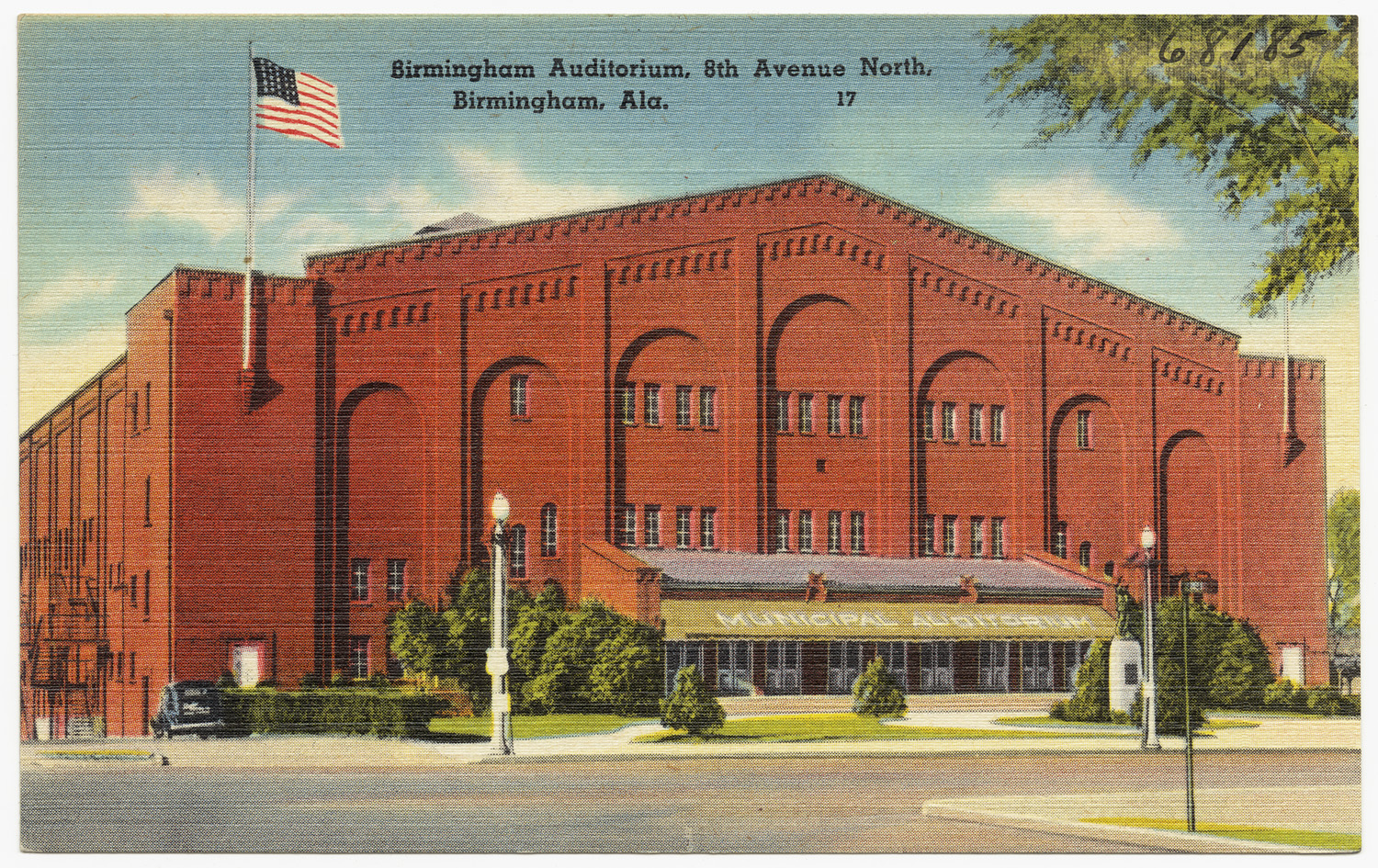
Municipal Auditorium on an old postcard

Boutwell Memorial Auditorium is a 4,300-seat multi-purpose arena located in Birmingham, Alabama. It was built in 1924 as Birmingham's Municipal Auditorium, on a site near City Hall, facing Capitol Park (now Linn Park).

The building was designed by Thomas W. Lamb, working with a committee of local architects. A later renovation added to the lobby and meeting room space in front of the brick facade, giving the street view of the auditorium a decidedly modernist marble, aluminum and glass look. The auditorium was renamed for Mayor Albert Boutwell. The auditorium remains the property of the city. It was home to the Birmingham Power basketball team.

Master plans for the future of the Birmingham Museum of Art, which adjoins Boutwell Auditorium, have included expanding onto its current site.

The interior of the facility includes seating in a horseshoe shape with a stage at the end opposite a balcony. The venue is multi-purpose and can be configured to suit athletic events, theatre and other events.

In 2022, the auditorium hosted muay thai, sumo wrestling, and kickboxing events as part of the 2022 World Games.

Events and tenants
Preceded by Augusta Civic Center; Casino Magic Bay St. Louis	Ultimate Fighting Championship venue UFC 14; UFC 20	Succeeded by Casino Magic Bay St. Louis; Five Seasons Events Center
