= International World Games Association =

Sporting organization

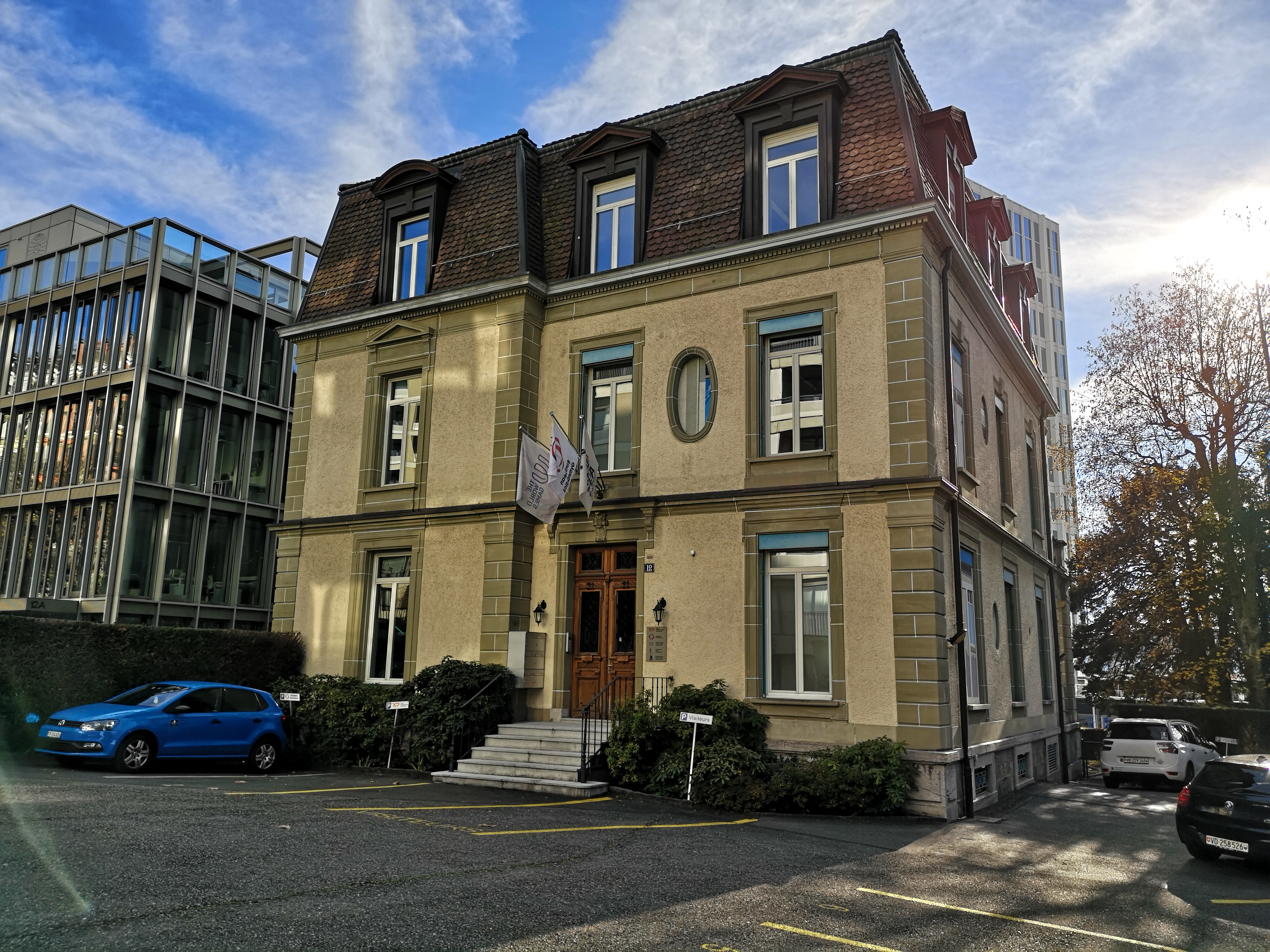
- Headquarters in Lausanne
- Abbreviation: IWGA
- Formation: 21 May 1980; 46 years ago
- Founded at: Seoul, South Korea
- Type: Sports association
- Headquarters: Lausanne, Switzerland
- Members: 40
- Official language: English
- President: Anna Arzhanova
- Website: www.theworldgames.org

The International World Games Association (IWGA) is an international association, recognised by the International Olympic Committee (IOC), that organises every four years, beginning in 1981, the multi-sport event called The World Games.

== History ==
The IWGA was founded on 21 May 1980 in Seoul, South Korea, as World Games Council by 12 international sports federations with a worldwide reach that were not yet part of the Olympic Games. The intention was to increase the popularity of the sports represented by these federations. The IWGA was constituted under Swiss law as a non-governmental and non-profit-making organisation.

In 1984, the World Games Council was renamed as the International World Games Association. Since its creation, the number of member federations has increased to 40 with the most recent admission being the International Chess Federation on 25 April 2026.

== Structure ==
The highest body of the IWGA is the General Meeting. It is chaired by the President. It is composed of representatives from Member Federations, with one vote per federation. General Meetings can be held whenever deemed necessary, but one must be held each year as the Annual General Meeting (AGM). Among other rights, the General Meeting has the power to:

- Approve and amend the Constitution
- Ratify the selection of the Host City of The World Games
- Ratify the selection of the sports, or disciplines of sports, of The World Games
- Establish Committees

== Membership ==
Federations that intend to become a full member of the IWGA must be part of the Association of IOC Recognised International Sports Federations (ARISF). Since 2014, IOC recognition has become a prerequisite for International Federations to become a Member of the IWGA. Sports that want to be recognised by the IWGA need to have a worldwide significance but actually must not be in the programme of the Olympic Games. Increasingly, international sports federations that take part in the Olympic Games have maintained a presence in the World Games for the disciplines and events that cannot be included in the Olympics, e.g. compound and field archery, acrobatic and aerobic gymnastics.

=== Affiliate status ===
Since 2020, Affiliate Status was introduced for full Members of ASOIF and AIOWF.

Affiliate status is temporary, and only open to those Federations that are not a Member of the IWGA and feature on the programme of the next edition of The World Games or of other sport events that the IWGA organises.

=== Member federations ===
The following international sports federations are members of IWGA.

Sport	International federation (IF)
Aikido	International Aikido Federation (IAF)
Air sports	World Air Sports Federation (FAI)
American football	International Federation of American Football (IFAF)
Archery	World Archery
Baseball and softball	World Baseball Softball Confederation (WBSC)
Billiards sports	World Confederation of Billiards Sports (WCBS)
Boules sports	World Pétanque and Bowls Federation (WPBF)
Bowling	International Bowling Federation (IBF)
Canoe	Paddle Worldwide (PW)
Casting	International Casting Sport Federation (ICSF)
Cheerleading	International Cheer Union (ICU)
Chess	International Chess Federation (FIDE)
DanceSport	World DanceSport Federation (WDSF)
Fistball	International Fistball Association (IFA)
Fitness and Bodybuilding	International Fitness and Bodybuilding Federation (IFBB)
Floorball	International Floorball Federation (IFF)
Flying disc sports	World Flying Disc Federation (WFDF)
Gymnastics	World Gymnastics (FIG)
Handball	International Handball Federation (IHF)
Hockey	International Hockey Federation (FIH)
Sport Ju-Jitsu	Ju-Jitsu International Federation (JJIF)
Karate	World Karate Federation (WKF)
Kickboxing	World Association of Kickboxing Organizations (WAKO)
Korfball	International Korfball Federation (IKF)
Lacrosse	World Lacrosse
Life saving	International Life Saving Federation (ILS)
Muay Thai	International Federation of Muaythai Associations (IFMA)
Orienteering	International Orienteering Federation (IOF)
Powerlifting	International Powerlifting Federation (IPF)
Racquetball	International Racquetball Federation (IRF)
Roller sports	World Skate (WSK)
Rugby sevens	World Rugby (WR)
Sambo	International Sambo Federation (FIAS)
Sport climbing	World Climbing (IFSC)
Squash	World Squash (WSF)
Sumo	International Sumo Federation (ISF)
Tug of War	Tug of War International Federation (TWIF)
Underwater sports	World Underwater Federation (CMAS)
Water skiing & wakeboarding	International Water Ski Federation (IWWF)
Wushu	International Wushu Federation (IWUF)

== See also ==
- International Olympic Committee (IOC)
- Association of Summer Olympic International Federations (ASOIF)
- Association of International Olympic Winter Sports Federations (AIOWF)
- Association of IOC Recognised International Sports Federations (ARISF)
- SportAccord
- List of international sport federations
