= List of 2022 World Games medal winners =

The 2022 World Games were held in Birmingham, Alabama, United States, from July 7 to July 17, 2022.

== Acrobatic gymnastics ==
Event	Gold	Silver	Bronze
Men's pair	Ukraine; Bohdan Pohranychnyi; Danylo Stetsiuk	United States; Braiden McDougall; Angel Felix	Kazakhstan; Daniyel Dil; Vadim Shulyar
Men's group	Great Britain; Bradley Gold; Archie Goonesekera; Finlay Gray; Andrew Morris-Hunt	Belgium; Simon De Wever; Jonas Raus; Viktor Vermeire; Wannes Vlaeminck	Ukraine; Stanislav Kukurudz; Yurii Push; Yuriy Savka; Taras Yarush
Women's pair	Ukraine; Viktoriia Kozlovska; Taisiia Marchenko	Portugal; Rita Teixeira; Rita Ferreira	United States; Katie Borcherding; Cierra McKown
Women's group	Belgium; Kim Bergmans; Lise De Meyst; Bo Hollebosch	Portugal; Beatriz Carneiro; Francisca Maia; Bárbara Sequeira	Ukraine; Viktoriia Kunitska; Oleksandra Malchuk; Daryna Pomianovska
Mixed pair	Belgium; Bram Röttger; Helena Heijens	Germany; Daniel Blintsov; Pia Schuetze	Israel; Meron Weissman; Adi Horwitz

== Aerobic gymnastics ==
Event	Gold	Silver	Bronze
Mixed pair	Brazil; Lucas Barbosa; Tamires Silva	Hungary; Dániel Bali; Fanni Mazács	Bulgaria; Antonio Papazov; Ana-Maria Stoilova
Trio	Hungary; Dániel Bali; Balázs Farkas; Fanni Mazács	Italy; Sara Cutini; Davide Nacci; Francesco Sebastio	Romania; Gabriel Bocșer; Miruna Iordache; Daniel Țavoc
Group	Italy; Sara Cutini; Matteo Falera; Davide Nacci; Marcello Patteri; Francesco Sebastio	Hungary; Balázs Farkas; Zoltán Lőcsei; Fanni Mazács; Panna Szőllősi; Dániel Bali	Romania; Gabriel Bocșer; Leonard Manta; Mihai Alin Popa; Antonio Surdu; Daniel Țavoc
Dance	Hungary; Balázs Farkas; Kata Hajdú; Zoltán Lőcsei; Anna Makranszki; Janka Ökrös; Vanessza Ruzicska; Zsófia Simon; Panna Szőllősi	Romania; Darius Branda; Sandra Dincă; Mirela Frîncu; Leonard Manta; Daria Mihaiu; Sarmiza Niculescu; Mihai Alin Popa; Antonio Surdu	Azerbaijan; Vladimir Dolmatov; Madina Mustafayeva; Khadija Guliyeva; Rauf Hajiyev; Sanan Mahmudlu; Nigar Mir Jalalli; Nazrin Mustafayeva; Aykhan Ahmadli

== Air sports ==
Event	Gold	Silver	Bronze
Drone racing	Killian Rousseau; France	Paweł Laszczak; Poland	Alejandro Zamora; Spain
Parachuting canopy piloting	Cédric Veiga Rios; France	Nick Batsch; United States	Abdulbari Al-Qubaisi; United Arab Emirates

== Archery ==
Event	Gold	Silver	Bronze
Men's compound	Miguel Becerra; Mexico	Jean-Philippe Boulch; France	Christopher Perkins; Canada
Men's field recurve	Florian Unruh; Germany	Brady Ellison; United States	Marco Morello; Italy
Men's field barebow	Erik Jonsson; Sweden	Leo Pettersson; Sweden	Ryan Davis; United States
Women's compound	Ella Gibson; Great Britain	Sara López; Colombia	Paige Pearce; United States
Women's field recurve	Chiara Rebagliati; Italy	Bryony Pitman; Great Britain	Elisa Tartler; Germany
Women's field barebow	Cinzia Noziglia; Italy	Christina Lyons; United States	Lina Björklund; Sweden
Mixed team compound	Colombia; Daniel Muñoz; Sara López	Netherlands; Mike Schloesser; Jody Beckers	India; Abhishek Verma; Jyothi Surekha

== Artistic roller skating ==
Event	Gold	Silver	Bronze
Men's free skating	Pau García; Spain	Alessandro Liberatore; Italy	Tim Schubert; Germany
Women's free skating	Rebecca Tarlazzi; Italy	Andrea Silva; Spain	Carla Escrich; Spain
Dance	Portugal; Pedro Walgode; Ana Luísa Walgode	Italy; Giovanni Piccolantonio; Asya Sofia Testoni	Colombia; Brayan Carreño; Daniela Gerena

== Beach handball ==
Event	Gold	Silver	Bronze
Men	Croatia; Tomislav Lauš; Ivan Dumenčić; Ivan Jurić; Filip Goričanec; Dominik Marković; Lucian Bura; Josip Đukes; Valentino Valentaković; Josip Leko; Nikola Finek	Qatar; Mutasem Mohamed; Mohamed Hassan; Ali Mohamed; Abdulrazzaq Murad; Mohsin Yafai; Mohamed Soussi; Amir Denguir; Sid Kenaoui; Hani Kakhi; Mohamed Saleh	Brazil; Cristiano Rossa; André Simões; Renan Carvalho; Bruno Gomes; Nailson Amaral; Bruno Oliveira; Gil Pires; Thiago Barcellos; Marcelo Tuller; Hugo Fernandes
Women	Germany; Kirsten Walter; Michelle Schäfer; Belen Gettwart; Isabel Kattner; Lena Klingler; Katharina Filter; Carolin Hübner; Lucie Kretzschmar; Liv Süchting; Amelie Möllmann	Norway; Thea Granlund; Elisabeth Hammerstad; Martine Welfler; Marielle Martinsen; Hanne Olsvik; Susanne Pettersen; Maren Sjaamo; Ine Grimsrud; Tonje Lerstad; Thina Øyesvold	Argentina; Agustina Mirotta; Gisella Bonomi; Carolina Ponce; Fiorella Corimberto; Ivana Eliges; Gisela Thurmann; Micaela Corimberto; Florencia Bericio; Celeste Meccia; Luciana Scordamaglia

== Boules sports ==
Event	Gold	Silver	Bronze
Women's lyonnaise precision	Nives Jelovica; Croatia	Marika Depetris; Italy	Nataša Antonjak; Serbia
Women's lyonnaise progressive	Ophélie Armanet; France	Ria Vojković; Croatia	Gaia Gamba; Italy
Women's pétanque shooting	Ouk Sreymom; Cambodia	Bekah Howe; United States	Phantipha Wongchuvej; Thailand
Women's pétanque doubles	Cambodia; Ouk Sreymom; Un Sreya	France; Nadège Baussian; Caroline Bourriaud	Thailand; Nantawan Fueangsanit; Phantipha Wongchuvej

== Bowling ==
Event	Gold	Silver	Bronze
Men's singles	Sam Cooley; Australia	Jaroslav Lorenc; Czech Republic	Graham Fach; Canada
Men's doubles	Denmark; Jesper Agerbo; Dan Østergaard-Poulsen	Canada; Darren Alexander; Graham Fach	South Korea; Kim Dong-hyeon; Park Dong-hyuk
Women's singles	Shannon O'Keefe; United States	Clara Guerrero; Colombia	Jenny Wegner; Sweden
Women's doubles	Denmark; Mika Guldbæk; Mai Ginge Jensen	United States; Julia Bond; Shannon O'Keefe	Malaysia; Natasha Roslan; Jane Sin

== Canoe marathon ==
Event	Gold	Silver	Bronze
Men's K-1 short distance	Mads Pedersen; Denmark	Nico Paufler; Germany	José Ramalho; Portugal
Men's K-1 standard distance	Andy Birkett; South Africa	Mads Pedersen; Denmark	Iván Alonso; Spain
Women's K-1 short distance	Vanda Kiszli; Hungary	Eva Barrios; Spain	Zsóka Csikós; Hungary
Women's K-1 standard distance	Vanda Kiszli; Hungary	Cathrine Rask; Denmark	Eva Barrios; Spain

== Canoe polo ==
Event	Gold	Silver	Bronze
Men	Germany; Julian Prescher; Lennart Unterfeld; Tim Riecke; Jonas Gauselmann; Arne Beckmann; René Kirchhoff; Jonas Vieren; Marco Hoppstock	France; Alan Lignel; Baptiste Cotta; David Linet; Antoine Le Floch Decorchemont; Patrice Belat; Clément Kindig; Benoît Richer; Christophe Belat	Spain; Javier Arego; Ángel Gordo; Sergio Corbella; Samuel Pardavila; Iván Hoyo; Alejandro Gordo; Alejandro Casal; Alejandro Valls
Women	France; Eloïse Frigot; Mélissa Ledormeur; Marion Robert; Claire Moal; Céleste Louis; Aline Roulland; Clotilde Lemasle; Camille Meyer	Germany; Jill Rutzen; Katharina Kruse; Jule Schwarz; Svenja Schaeper; Nele Schmalenbach; Leonie Wagner; Hilke Vogt; Elena Gilles	New Zealand; Klara Richter; Emma Sutherland; Georgia Wheeler; Julie Bolton; Kate Bolton; Sophie Winton; Erin Moore; Casey Hales

== Cue sports ==
Event	Gold	Silver	Bronze
Men's three-cushion carom	Dick Jaspers; Netherlands	José Juan García; Colombia	Eddy Merckx; Belgium
Men's nine-ball pool	Joshua Filler; Germany	Sanjin Pehlivanović; Bosnia and Herzegovina	Aloysius Yapp; Singapore
Men's snooker	Cheung Ka Wai; Hong Kong	Abdelrahman Shahin; Egypt	Darren Morgan; Great Britain
Women's nine-ball pool	Kelly Fisher; Great Britain	Chou Chieh-yu; Chinese Taipei	Yuki Hiraguchi; Japan

== Dancesport ==
Event	Gold	Silver	Bronze
Men's breaking	Victor Montalvo; United States	Jeffrey Louis; United States	Shigeyuki Nakarai; Japan
Women's breaking	Ami Yuasa; Japan	Sunny Choi; United States	Ayumi Fukushima; Japan
Standard	Lithuania; Evaldas Sodeika; Ieva Žukauskaitė	Italy; Francesco Galuppo; Debora Pacini	Lithuania; Vaidotas Lacitis; Veronika Golodneva
Latin	Moldova; Gabriele Goffredo; Anna Matus	Germany; Marius-Andrei Balan; Khrystyna Moshenska	France; Charles-Guillaume Schmitt; Elena Salikhova
Rock 'n' Roll	Germany; Tobias Bludau; Michelle Uhl	Switzerland; Nicolas Kuran-Pellegatta; Noëmi Kuran-Pellegatta	Austria; Matthias Feichtinger; Anna Sturm

== Duathlon ==
Event	Gold	Silver	Bronze
Men's individual	Maxime Hueber-Moosbrugger; France	Benjamin Choquert; France	Víctor Zambrano; Mexico
Women's individual	Maurine Ricour; Belgium	Ai Ueda; Japan	Joselyn Brea; Venezuela
Mixed relay	France; Maxime Hueber-Moosbrugger; Marion Legrand	Belgium; Arnaud Dely; Maurine Ricour	France; Nathan Guerbeur; Garance Blaut

== Finswimming ==
Event	Gold	Silver	Bronze
Men's 100 m surface	Max Poschart; Germany	Filip Strikinac; Croatia	Anastasios Mylonakis; Greece
Men's 200 m surface	Max Poschart; Germany	Alex Mozsár; Hungary	Ádám Bukor; Hungary
Men's 400 m surface	Alex Mozsár; Hungary	Yoon Young-joong; South Korea	Ádám Bukor; Hungary
Men's 50 m bi-fins	Szymon Kropidłowski; Poland	Stylianos Chatziiliadis; Greece	Christos Bonias; Greece
Men's 100 m bi-fins	Péter Holoda; Hungary	Szymon Kropidłowski; Poland	Christos Bonias; Greece
Men's 50 m apnoea	Zhang Siqian; China	Tong Zhenbo; China	Kim Chan-yeong; South Korea
Men's 4 × 50 m surface relay	Colombia; Juan Rodríguez; Juan Duque; Mauricio Fernández; Juan Ocampo	China; Zhang Siqian; Shan Yongan; Wang Zhihao; Tong Zhenbo	Germany; Justus Mörstedt; Malte Striegler; Robert Golenia; Max Poschart
Men's 4 × 100 m surface relay	Germany; Robert Golenia; Malte Striegler; Justus Mörstedt; Max Poschart	Colombia; Juan Rodríguez; Juan Duque; Mauricio Fernández; Juan Ocampo	China; Wang Zhihao; Tong Zhenbo; Zhang Siqian; Shan Yongan
Women's 100 m surface	Shu Chengjing; China	Xu Yichuan; China	Grace Fernández; Colombia
Women's 200 m surface	Sofiia Hrechko; Ukraine	Dora Bassi; Croatia	Csilla Károlyi; Hungary
Women's 400 m surface	Johanna Schikora; Germany	Sofiia Hrechko; Ukraine	Anastasiia Antoniak; Ukraine
Women's 50 m bi-fins	Petra Senánszky; Hungary	Choi Min-ji; South Korea	Krisztina Varga; Hungary
Women's 100 m bi-fins	Petra Senánszky; Hungary	Krisztina Varga; Hungary	Zuzana Hrašková; Slovakia
Women's 50 m apnoea	Hu Yaoyao; China	Shu Chengjing; China	Paula Aguirre; Colombia
Women's 4 × 50 m surface relay	China; Shu Chengjing; Hu Yaoyao; Chen Sijia; Xu Yichuan	Colombia; Paula Aguirre; Diana Moreno; Viviana Retamozo; Grace Fernández	South Korea; Moon Ye-jin; Kim Min-jeong; Jang Ye-sol; Seo Ui-jin
Women's 4 × 100 m surface relay	China; Shu Chengjing; Hu Yaoyao; Chen Sijia; Xu Yichuan	Hungary; Sára Suba; Petra Senánszky; Csilla Károlyi; Krisztina Varga	Colombia; Grace Fernández; Viviana Retamozo; Diana Moreno; Paula Aguirre

== Fistball ==
Event	Gold	Silver	Bronze
Men	Germany; Patrick Thomas; Fabian Sagstetter; Philip Hofmann; Rouven Kadgien; Jonas Schröter; Ole Schachtsiek; Nick Trinemeier; Philipp Kübler; Felix Klassen; Tim Albrecht	Switzerland; Raphael Schlattinger; Joël Fehr; Ueli Rebsamen; Silvan Jung; Tim Egolf; Nicolas Fehr; Rico Strassmann; Leon Heitz; Cedric Steinbauer; Luca Flückiger	Brazil; Rafael Ceccon; Alexandre Passos; Fernando Tedesco; Douglas Brados; Mateus Kuntzler; Gabriel Heck; Sérgio Mueller; Gabriel Drumm; Bruno Arnold; Gabriel Araújo
Women	Germany; Theresa Schröder; Hinrike Seitz; Sonja Pfrommer; Luca von Loh; Helle Großmann; Ida Hollmann; Svenja Schröder; Michaela Grzywatz; Anna-Lisa Aldinger; Henriette Schell	Switzerland; Noëmi Egolf; Mirjam Schlattinger; Jamie Bucher; Adéla Lang; Sarina Mattle; Tanja Bognar; Seraina Schenker; Fabienne Frischknecht; Rahel Hess; Sara Peterhans	Brazil; Isabella Lucchin; Melissa Knebel; Giovanna Lucchin; Cecília Jaques; Angela Melo; Tatiane Schneider; Rejane Sinhori; Bianca Süffert; Cristiane Huaska; Sabine Süffert

== Flag football ==
Event	Gold	Silver	Bronze
Men	United States; Bruce Mapp; Johnny Rembert; Jordan Oquendo; Laval Davis; Dezmin Lewis; Darrell Doucette; Aamir Brown; Laderrick Smith; Frankie Solomon; James Calhoun; David Price; Geoffrey Bryan	Italy; Luke Zahradka; Mark Simone; Gerardo Frazzetto; Matteo Galante; Jared Gerbino; Tamsir Seck; Gianluca Santagostino; Lorenzo Scaperrotta; Giuseppe Della Vecchia; Riccardo Petrilli; Flavio Piccinni; Matteo Mozzanica	Mexico; Víctor Balderramos; Bruno Quijano; Carlos Espinoza; Said Salazar; David Ramírez; Alejandro Esquer; Jorge Olivera; Sebastián Olvera; Cosme Lozano; Guillermo Villalobos; Iván Méndez; Joshua Olivo
Women	Mexico; Sheilla Silva; Silvia Contreras; Mónica Rangel; Pamela Reyes; Rebeca Landa; Ana Gabriela Rojano; Ingrid Ramírez; Andrea Delgadillo; Diana Flores; Arianna Lora; Indra Fernández; Xiomara Ríos	United States; Jo Overstreet; Mariah Gearhart; Vanita Krouch; Sheneika Comice; Nadia Bibbs; Ashley Whisonant; Deliah Autry; Mary Kate Bula; Ayanna Pate; Michelle Roque; Crystal Winter; Crystal Daniels	Panama; Arlen Hernández; Leslie Del Cid; Orlanda Castro; María Gallimore; Titiana Dos Santos; Ayín Rodríguez; Thaymiluz Santos; Valerie Castillero; María Rodríguez; Andrea Castillo; Ana Paula De León; Ángela Evans

== Floorball ==
Event	Gold	Silver	Bronze
Men	Sweden; Jon Hedlund; Johan Samuelsson; Rasmus Enström; Albin Sjögren; Ludwig Persson; Tobias Gustafsson; Jesper Sankell; Kevin Haglund; Linus Holmgren; Emil Johansson; Hampus Ahrén; Malte Lundmark; Niklas Ramirez; Måns Parsjö Tegnér	Finland; Eemeli Akola; Konsta Tykkyläinen; Eemeli Salin; Eetu Sikkinen; Joonas Pylsy; Nico Salo; Lassi Toriseva; Ville Lastikka; Mikko Leikkanen; Joona Rantala; Justus Kainulainen; Sami Johansson; Otto Lehkosuo; Oskari Fälden	Czech Republic; Lukáš Punčochář; Mikuláš Krbec; Adam Delong; Adam Hemerka; Filip Forman; Matěj Havlas; Matyáš Šindler; Ondřej Němeček; Jiří Besta; Dominik Beneš; Filip Langer; Martin Beneš; Josef Rýpar; Lukáš Bauer

== Flying disc ==
Event	Gold	Silver	Bronze
Mixed ultimate	United States; Carolyn Finney; Kaela Helton; Opi Payne; Dylan Freechild; Grant Lindsley; Nate Goff; Claire Chastain; Jimmy Mickle; Jack Williams; Chris Kocher; Carolyn Normile; Claire Trop; Sarah Meckstroth; Khalif El-Salaam	Australia; Sally Yu; Kyal Oh; Sam McGuckin; Alex Prentice; Alex Gan; Mish Phillips; Olivia Carr; Caro Ma; Georgia Egan-Griffiths; Rob Andrews; Alex Ladomatos; Cat Phillips; Tom Tulett; Alex Shepherd	Colombia; Alejandra Torres; Manuela Cárdenas; Julio Duque; Alexander Ford; Iván Alba; Elizabeth Mosquera; Yina Cartagena; Simón Ramírez; Valeria Cárdenas; Andrés Ramírez; José Jiménez; Ximena Montaña; Jonathan Cantor; María Angélica Forero

== Inline hockey ==
Event	Gold	Silver	Bronze
Men	United States; P. J. Kavaya; Travis Noe; Brandon Hawkins; Nathan Sigmund; Tyler Kraft; Joey DiMartino; Michael Maczynski; Troy Redmann; Peter DiMartino; Derrick Burnett; Garret Ross; Brett Olinger; Billy Pascalli; Jack Combs	Czech Republic; Aleš Chamrád; Mikuláš Zbořil; Jakub Bernard; Štěpán Turek; Oscar Flynn; Dominik Frodl; Daniel Brabec; Patrik Šebek; Petr Kafka; Martin Fiala; Tomáš Rubeš; Jan Vyoral; Marek Loskot; Filip Kuťák	France; Enzo Renou; Théo Faucherand; Baptiste Bouchut; Karl Gabillet; Joan Kerkhove; Sébastien Pasquier; Louis Allo; Damien Lafourcade; Valentin Gonzalez; Elliot Machy; Benoît Ladonne; Maxime Langlois; Lambert Hamon; Théo Fontanille

== Ju-jitsu ==
Event	Gold	Silver	Bronze
Men's fighting 62 kg	Bohdan Mochulskyi; Ukraine	Alejandro Viviescas; Colombia	Ecco van der Veer; Netherlands
Men's fighting 69 kg	Jaschar Salmanow; Germany	Ivan Della Croce; Serbia	Tim Toplak; Slovenia
Men's fighting 77 kg	Simon Attenberger; Germany	Lucas Andersen; Denmark	Boy Vogelzang; Netherlands
Men's fighting 85 kg	Nikola Trajković; Serbia	Donny Donker; Netherlands	Daniel Zmeev; Germany
Men's ne-waza 69 kg	Florian Bayili; Belgium	Mohamed Al-Suwaidi; United Arab Emirates	Viki Dabush; Israel
Men's ne-waza 77 kg	Nimrod Ryeder; Israel	Ali Munfaredi; Bahrain	Michael Sheehan; Canada
Men's ne-waza 85 kg	Faisal Al-Ketbi; United Arab Emirates	Abdurahmanhaji Murtazaliev; Kyrgyzstan	Saar Shemesh; Israel
Men's ne-waza openweight	Faisal Al-Ketbi; United Arab Emirates	Seif-Eddine Houmine; Morocco	Saar Shemesh; Israel
Women's fighting 48 kg	Kanjutha Phattaraboonsorn; Thailand	Athanasia Zariopi; Greece	Sandra Badie; France
Women's fighting 57 kg	Licaï Pourtois; Belgium	Christina Koutoulaki; Greece	Rebekka Dahl; Denmark
Women's fighting 63 kg	Juliana Ferreira; France	Orapa Senatham; Thailand	Lilian Weiken; Germany
Women's fighting 70 kg	Annalena Bauer; Germany	Chloé Lalande; France	Liva Tanzer; Denmark
Women's ne-waza 48 kg	Vicky Hoang; Canada	Kanjutha Phattaraboonsorn; Thailand	Irina Brodski; Germany
Women's ne-waza 57 kg	Meshy Rosenfeld; Israel	Galina Duvanova; Kazakhstan	Laurence Fouillat; France
Women's ne-waza 63 kg	Maja Povšnar; Slovenia	Rony Nisimian; Israel	Shamma Al-Kalbani; United Arab Emirates
Women's ne-waza openweight	Meshy Rosenfeld; Israel	Bogdana Golub; Ukraine	Shamma Al-Kalbani; United Arab Emirates
Mixed duo	Thailand; Warawut Saengsriruang; Lalita Yuennan	Belgium; Ian Lodens; Charis Gravensteyn	Switzerland; Thomas Schönenberger; Sofia Sokl
Mixed team	France; Sandra Badie; Valentin Blumental; Juliana Ferreira; Laurence Fouillat; Percy Kunsa; Chloé Lalande; Julien Mathieu	Germany; Simon Attenberger; Annalena Bauer; Irina Brodski; Julia Paszkiewicz; Jaschar Salmanow; Johannes Tourbeslis; Lilian Weiken; Daniel Zmeev	Netherlands; Géneviève Bogers; Lidija Caković; Donny Donker; Anne van der Brugge; Ecco van der Veer; Aafke van Leeuwen; Boy Vogelzang; Stefan Vukotić

== Karate ==
Event	Gold	Silver	Bronze
Men's kata	Kazumasa Moto; Japan	Damián Quintero; Spain	Gakuji Tozaki; United States
Men's kumite 60 kg	Ayoub Anis Helassa; Algeria	Douglas Brose; Brazil	Angelo Crescenzo; Italy
Men's kumite 67 kg	Vinícius Figueira; Brazil	Yves Martial Tadissi; Hungary	Dionysios Xenos; Greece
Men's kumite 75 kg	Abdalla Abdelaziz; Egypt	Stanislav Horuna; Ukraine	Dastonbek Otabolaev; Uzbekistan
Men's kumite 84 kg	Youssef Badawy; Egypt	Nabil Ech-Chaabi; Morocco	Kamran Madani; United States
Men's kumite +84 kg	Babacar Seck; Spain	Anđelo Kvesić; Croatia	Taha Tarek; Egypt
Women's kata	Sandra Sánchez; Spain	Hikaru Ono; Japan	Grace Lau; Hong Kong
Women's kumite 50 kg	Junna Tsukii; Philippines	Yorgelis Salazar; Venezuela	Miho Miyahara; Japan
Women's kumite 55 kg	Anzhelika Terliuga; Ukraine	Ahlam Youssef; Egypt	Trinity Allen; United States
Women's kumite 61 kg	Anita Serogina; Ukraine	Alexandra Grande; Peru	Ingrida Suchánková; Slovakia
Women's kumite 68 kg	Silvia Semeraro; Italy	Alisa Buchinger; Austria	Alizée Agier; France
Women's kumite +68 kg	Sofya Berultseva; Kazakhstan	María Torres; Spain	Chehinez Jemi; Tunisia

== Kickboxing ==
Event	Gold	Silver	Bronze
Men's K1 63.5 kg	Miguel Martínez; Mexico	Orfan Sananzade; Ukraine	Ikbol Fozilzhonov; Kyrgyzstan
Men's K1 75 kg	Or Moshe; Israel	Vitalii Dubina; Ukraine	Petr Dvořáček; Czech Republic
Men's K1 +91 kg	Bahram Rajabzadeh; Azerbaijan	Anto Širić; Croatia	Roman Shcherbatiuk; Ukraine
Women's K1 52 kg	Shir Cohen; Israel	Iwona Nieroda-Zdziebko; Poland	Daryna Ivanova; Ukraine
Women's K1 60 kg	Stella Hemetsberger; Austria	Milana Bjelogrlić; Serbia	Alina Martyniuk; Ukraine
Women's K1 70 kg	Aleksandra Krstić; Serbia	Alexandra Filipová; Slovakia	Virve Vanhakoski; Finland

== Korfball ==
Event	Gold	Silver	Bronze
Mixed	Netherlands; Jessica Lokhorst; Esther Cordus; Barbara Brouwer; Brett Zuijdwegt; Sanne van der Werff; Daan Preuninger; Fleur Hoek; Olav van Wijngaarden; Terrenc Griemink; Harjan Visscher; Alwin Out; Laurens Leeuwenhoek; Jelmer Jonker; Anouk Haars	Belgium; Stien Reyntjens; Lisa Pauwels; Shiara Driesen; Julie Caluwé; Lauren Denis; Saar Seys; Lars Courtens; Jordan De Vogelaere; Kian Amorgaste; Cédric Schoumacker; Jari Hardies; Amber Engels; Lennert Impens; Brent Struyf	Chinese Taipei; Lin Ya-wen; Chen Cin; Peng Chien-chin; Chang Shu-chi; Wang Yi-wen; Lo Kai-yeh; Chan Ya-han; Wu Chun-hsien; Chang Chieh-sheng; Chiu Han-sheng; Chen Chun-ta; Tai Wei-jhe; Kao Chen-yu; Huang Tzu-yao

== Lacrosse ==
Event	Gold	Silver	Bronze
Men's sixes	Canada; Wesley Berg; Josh Byrne; Challen Rogers; Jordan MacIntosh; Reid Bowering; Clarke Petterson; Drake Porter; Brett Dobson; Jeff Teat; Bryan Cole; Zach Currier; Dhane Smith	United States; Connor Kirst; Colin Heacock; Ryan Tierney; Adam Ghitelman; Brian Tevlin; Justin Guterding; Liam Byrnes; Ryan Conrad; Zach Goodrich; Tom Schreiber; Jack Kelly; Matt Brandau	Japan; Shinya Tateishi; Kazuki Obana; Yuto Komatsu; Kiyoshi Sano; Dai Sato; Hiroki Kanaya; Tomoki Umehara; Seiya Natsume; Junichi Suzuki; Soya Tokumasu; Yuki Fukushima; Kinori Sugihara
Women's sixes	Canada; Lauren Black; Aurora Cordingley; Emily Boissonneault; Brooklyn Walker-Welch; Nicole Perroni; Megan Kinna; Lydia Sutton; Annabel Child; Dana Dobbie; Erica Evans; Lauren Spence	United States; Paige Petty; Kasey Choma; Belle Smith; Madison Doucette; Madison Ahern; Danielle Pavinelli; Ellie Masera; Sam Swart; Meaghan Tyrrell; Caitlyn Wurzburger; Marge Donovan; Haley Hicklen	Australia; Sarah Smith; Rebecca Lane; Indyah Williams; Abby Thorne; Sarah Mollison; Addie Cunningham; Theadora Kwas; Cassidy Doster; Olivia Parker; Tegan Brown; Bonnie Yu; Georgia Latch

== Lifesaving ==
Event	Gold	Silver	Bronze
Men's 200 m obstacle	Andreas Hansen; Denmark	Francesco Ippolito; Italy	Enzo Nardozza; Italy
Men's 50 m manikin carry	Danny Wieck; Germany	Francesco Ippolito; Italy	Joshua Perling; Germany
Men's 100 m manikin carry fins	Jan Malkowski; Germany	Fabio Pezzotti; Italy	Tim Brang; Germany
Men's 100 m manikin tow fins	Tim Brang; Germany	Javier Catalá; Spain	Alberto Turrado; Spain
Men's 200 m super lifesaver	Francesco Ippolito; Italy	Kevin Lasserre; France	Federico Gilardi; Italy
Men's 4 × 50 m obstacle relay	Hungary; Szebasztián Szabó; Bence Gyárfás; Krisztián Takács; Gábor Balog	Italy; Mauro Ferro; Simone Locchi; Francesco Ippolito; Davide Marchese	Japan; Naoya Hirano; Takahiro Itaba; Yoshiharu Takasu; Suguru Ando
Men's 4 × 25 m manikin carry relay	Germany; Fabian Ende; Joshua Perling; Fabian Thorwesten; Danny Wieck	Italy; Mauro Ferro; Fabio Pezzotti; Francesco Ippolito; Simone Locchi	Poland; Wojciech Kotowski; Adam Dubiel; Cezary Kępa; Hubert Nakielski
Men's 4 × 50 m medley relay	Hungary; Krisztián Takács; Gábor Balog; Szebasztián Szabó; Bence Gyárfás	Italy; Davide Marchese; Fabio Pezzotti; Simone Locchi; Francesco Ippolito	Germany; Fabian Ende; Jan Malkowski; Danny Wieck; Fabian Thorwesten
Women's 200 m obstacle	Nina Holt; Germany	Anna Pirovano; Italy	Alicja Tchórz; Poland
Women's 50 m manikin carry	Nina Holt; Germany	Helene Giovanelli; Italy	Kerstin Lange; Germany
Women's 100 m manikin carry fins	Undine Lauerwald; Germany	Antía García; Spain	Nina Holt; Germany
Women's 100 m manikin tow fins	Federica Volpini; Italy	Paola Lanzilotti; Italy	Justine Weyders; France
Women's 200 m super lifesaver	Magali Rousseau; France	Paola Lanzilotti; Italy	Silvia Meschiari; Italy
Women's 4 × 50 m obstacle relay	Hungary; Petra Senánszky; Fanni Gyurinovics; Zsuzsanna Jakabos; Evelyn Verrasztó	Shared gold	Italy; Helene Giovanelli; Lucrezia Fabretti; Francesca Pasquino; Silvia Meschiari
Women's 4 × 50 m obstacle relay	Poland; Kornelia Fiedkiewicz; Klaudia Naziębło; Paula Żukowska; Alicja Tchórz	Shared gold	Italy; Helene Giovanelli; Lucrezia Fabretti; Francesca Pasquino; Silvia Meschiari
Women's 4 × 25 m manikin carry relay	Germany; Undine Lauerwald; Nina Holt; Vivian Zander; Kerstin Lange	France; Ava Prêtre; Magali Rousseau; Leslie Belkacemi; Ludivine Blanc	Belgium; Sofie Boogaerts; Stefanie Lindekens; Nele Vanbuel; Aurélie Romanini
Women's 4 × 50 m medley relay	Germany; Nina Holt; Vivian Zander; Kerstin Lange; Undine Lauerwald	Hungary; Zsuzsanna Jakabos; Panna Ugrai; Fanni Gyurinovics; Petra Senánszky	Italy; Helene Giovanelli; Lucrezia Fabretti; Francesca Pasquino; Federica Volpini

== Muaythai ==
Event	Gold	Silver	Bronze
Men's 57 kg	Nguyễn Trần Duy Nhất; Vietnam	Almaz Sarsembekov; Kazakhstan	Vladyslav Mykytas; Ukraine
Men's 63.5 kg	Igor Liubchenko; Ukraine	Weerasak Tharakhajad; Thailand	Nouredine Samir; United Arab Emirates
Men's 67 kg	Anueng Khatthamarasri; Thailand	Hamza Rachid; Morocco	Norbert Spéth; Hungary
Men's 71 kg	Thanet Nitutorn; Thailand	Oleksandr Yefimenko; Ukraine	Jordan Weiland; United States
Men's 81 kg	Aaron Ortiz; United States	Diogo Calado; Portugal	Ilyass Hbibali; United Arab Emirates
Men's 91 kg	Oleh Pryimachov; Ukraine	Matt Baker; United States	Łukasz Radosz; Poland
Women's 48 kg	Anastasiia Kulinich; Ukraine	Regan Gowing; Canada	Janet Garcia-Borbon; United States
Women's 51 kg	Monika Chochlíková; Slovakia	Meriem El-Moubarik; Morocco	Gabriela Kuzawińska; Poland
Women's 54 kg	Ashley Thiner; United States	Laura Burgos; Mexico	Yolanda Schmidt; Australia
Women's 57 kg	Iman Barlow; Great Britain	Tierra Brandt; United States	Patricia Axling; Sweden
Women's 60 kg	Charlsey Maner; United States	Nili Block; Israel	Ajsa Sándorfi; Hungary
Women's 63.5 kg	Zoe Putorak; Australia	Nora Cornolle; France	Erin Clayton; United States

== Orienteering ==
Event	Gold	Silver	Bronze
Men's sprint	Tim Robertson; New Zealand	Martin Regborn; Sweden	Tomáš Křivda; Czech Republic
Men's middle distance	Kasper Fosser; Norway	Matthias Kyburz; Switzerland	Martin Regborn; Sweden
Women's sprint	Simona Aebersold; Switzerland	Tereza Janošíková; Czech Republic	Elena Roos; Switzerland
Women's middle distance	Simona Aebersold; Switzerland	Karolin Ohlsson; Sweden	Ingrid Lundanes; Norway
Mixed relay	Switzerland; Simona Aebersold; Joey Hadorn; Matthias Kyburz; Elena Roos	Norway; Victoria Hæstad Bjørnstad; Håvard Eidsmo; Kasper Fosser; Ingrid Lundanes	Great Britain; Cecilie Andersen; Ralph Street; Jonny Crickmore; Charlotte Ward

== Parkour ==
Event	Gold	Silver	Bronze
Men's freestyle	Ioakeim Theodoridis; Greece	Elis Torhall; Sweden	Jérémy Lorsignol; Belgium
Men's speed	Bohdan Kolmakov; Ukraine	Andrea Consolini; Italy	David Nelmes; Great Britain
Women's freestyle	Noa Diorgina Man; Netherlands	Miranda Tibbling; Sweden	Hikari Izumi; Japan
Women's speed	Miranda Tibbling; Sweden	Noa Diorgina Man; Netherlands	Hikari Izumi; Japan

== Powerlifting ==
Event	Gold	Silver	Bronze
Men's lightweight	Yusuke Satake; Japan	Hsieh Tsung-ting; Chinese Taipei	Hassan El-Belghiti; France
Men's middleweight	Kjell Egil Bakkelund; Norway	Mykola Barannik; Ukraine	Paul Douglas; Virgin Islands
Men's heavyweight	Volodymyr Rysiyev; Ukraine	Ian Bell; Virgin Islands	Danylo Kovalov; Ukraine
Men's super heavyweight	Oleksiy Bychkov; Ukraine	Yang Sen; Chinese Taipei	Tony Cliffe; Great Britain
Women's lightweight	Yukako Fukushima; Japan	Zuzanna Kula; Poland	Anastasiia Derevianko; Ukraine
Women's middleweight	Carola Garra; Italy	Taylor LaChapelle; Virgin Islands	Larysa Soloviova; Ukraine
Women's heavyweight	Agata Sitko; Poland	Kelsey McCarthy; Virgin Islands	Cicera Tavares; Brazil
Women's super heavyweight	Rhaea Stinn; Canada	Bonica Brown; United States	Tetyana Melnyk; Ukraine

== Racquetball ==
Event	Gold	Silver	Bronze
Men's singles	Andrés Acuña; Costa Rica	Rodrigo Montoya; Mexico	Andree Parrilla; Mexico
Women's singles	Paola Longoria; Mexico	Gabriela Martínez; Guatemala	Angélica Barrios; Bolivia

== Rhythmic gymnastics ==
Event	Gold	Silver	Bronze
Women's hoop	Boryana Kaleyn; Bulgaria	Sofia Raffaeli; Italy	Fanni Pigniczki; Hungary
Women's ball	Daria Atamanov; Israel	Sofia Raffaeli; Italy	Fanni Pigniczki; Hungary
Women's clubs	Sofia Raffaeli; Italy	Daria Atamanov; Israel	Ekaterina Vedeneeva; Slovenia
Women's ribbon	Daria Atamanov; Israel	Boryana Kaleyn; Bulgaria	Viktoriia Onopriienko; Ukraine

== Road speed skating ==
Event	Gold	Silver	Bronze
Men's 100 m sprint	Jorge Martínez; Mexico	Kuo Li-yang; Chinese Taipei	Duccio Marsili; Italy
Men's 1 lap sprint	Duccio Marsili; Italy	Yvan Sivilier; France	Simon Albrecht; Germany
Men's 10000 m points	Bart Swings; Belgium	Daniel Zapata; Colombia	Mike Páez; Mexico
Men's 15000 m elimination	Bart Swings; Belgium	Martin Ferrié; France	Francisco Peula; Spain
Women's 100 m sprint	Geiny Pájaro; Colombia	Chen Ying-chu; Chinese Taipei	Asja Varani; Italy
Women's 1 lap sprint	Nerea Langa; Spain	Mathilde Pédronno; France	Chen Ying-chu; Chinese Taipei
Women's 10000 m points	Gabriela Vargas; Ecuador	Johana Viveros; Colombia	Marine Lefeuvre; France
Women's 15000 m elimination	Johana Viveros; Colombia	Valentina Letelier; Mexico	Marine Lefeuvre; France

== Softball ==
Event	Gold	Silver	Bronze
Women	United States; Ally Carda; Charla Echols; Haylie McCleney; Kinzie Hansen; Jailyn Ford; Monica Abbott; Michelle Moultrie; Taylor Pleasants; Amanda Lorenz; Janae Jefferson; Megan Faraimo; Dejah Mulipola; Hannah Flippen; Montana Fouts; Bubba Nickles	Japan; Sakura Miwa; Kanna Kudo; Yuka Ichiguchi; Kyoko Ishikawa; Yui Sakamoto; Nodoka Harada; Ayane Nakagawa; Hitomi Kawabata; Minori Naito; Yamato Fujita; Misaki Katsumata; Urara Fujimoto; Yume Kiriishi; Haruka Agatsuma; Miu Goto	Chinese Taipei; Shen Chia-wen; Ke Hsia-ai; Li Szu-shih; Lin Feng-chen; Ko Chia-hui; Tsai Chia-chen; Ho Yi-fan; Lin Chih-ying; Liu Hsuan; Chiu An-ju; Chiang Ting-en; Yang Yi-ting; Chen Chia-yi; Chang Chia-yun; Tu Ya-ting

== Sport climbing ==
Event	Gold	Silver	Bronze
Men's bouldering	Nicolas Collin; Belgium	Kokoro Fujii; Japan	Yoshiyuki Ogata; Japan
Men's lead	Sascha Lehmann; Switzerland	Masahiro Higuchi; Japan	Mejdi Schalck; France
Men's speed	Veddriq Leonardo; Indonesia	Kiromal Katibin; Indonesia	Yaroslav Tkach; Ukraine
Women's bouldering	Miho Nonaka; Japan	Katja Debevec; Slovenia	Mao Nakamura; Japan
Women's lead	Jessica Pilz; Austria	Natsuki Tanii; Japan	Lana Skušek; Slovenia
Women's speed	Emma Hunt; United States	Natalia Kałucka; Poland	Franziska Ritter; Germany

== Squash ==
Event	Gold	Silver	Bronze
Men's singles	Victor Crouin; France	Grégoire Marche; France	Miguel Ángel Rodríguez; Colombia
Women's singles	Tinne Gilis; Belgium	Lucy Beecroft; Great Britain	Coline Aumard; France

== Sumo ==
Event	Gold	Silver	Bronze
Men's 85 kg	Abdelrahman El-Sefy; Egypt	Demid Karachenko; Ukraine	Sviatoslav Semykras; Ukraine
Men's 115 kg	Vazha Daiauri; Ukraine	Shion Fujisawa; Japan	Aron Rozum; Poland
Men's +115 kg	Hidetora Hanada; Japan	Daiki Nakamura; Japan	Rui Júnior; Brazil
Men's openweight	Daiki Nakamura; Japan	Baasandorjiin Badral; Mongolia	Oleksandr Veresiuk; Ukraine
Women's 65 kg	Yuka Okutomi; Japan	Miku Yamanaka; Japan	Magdalena Macios; Poland
Women's 80 kg	Sakura Ishii; Japan	Karyna Kolesnik; Ukraine	Monika Skiba; Poland
Women's +80 kg	Svitlana Iaromka; Ukraine	Ivanna Berezovska; Ukraine	Airi Hisano; Japan
Women's openweight	Ivanna Berezovska; Ukraine	Hiyori Kon; Japan	Svitlana Iaromka; Ukraine

== Track speed skating ==
Event	Gold	Silver	Bronze
Men's 200 m time trial	Duccio Marsili; Italy	Andrés Jiménez; Colombia	Yvan Sivilier; France
Men's 500 m sprint	Andrés Jiménez; Colombia	Duccio Marsili; Italy	Kuo Li-yang; Chinese Taipei
Men's 1000 m sprint	Duccio Marsili; Italy	Ricardo Verdugo; Chile	Bart Swings; Belgium
Men's 10000 m elimination	Bart Swings; Belgium	Daniel Zapata; Colombia	Giuseppe Bramante; Italy
Men's 10000 m points elimination	Bart Swings; Belgium	Martin Ferrié; France	Nils Bühnemann; Germany
Women's 200 m time trial	Geiny Pájaro; Colombia	Asja Varani; Italy	Chen Ying-chu; Chinese Taipei
Women's 500 m sprint	Laethisia Schimek; Germany	None awarded	None awarded
Women's 1000 m sprint	Johana Viveros; Colombia	Angy Quintero; Venezuela	Gabriela Vargas; Ecuador
Women's 10000 m elimination	Johana Viveros; Colombia	Alejandra Traslaviña; Chile	Gabriela Vargas; Ecuador
Women's 10000 m points elimination	Johana Viveros; Colombia	Marine Lefeuvre; France	Gabriela Vargas; Ecuador

== Trampoline gymnastics ==
Event	Gold	Silver	Bronze
Men's double mini	David Franco; Spain	Daniel Schmidt; Germany	Ryohei Taniguchi; Japan
Men's tumbling	Kaden Brown; United States	Axel Duriez; France	Rasmus Steffensen; Denmark
Women's double mini	Melania Rodríguez; Spain	Bronwyn Dibb; New Zealand	Lina Sjöberg; Sweden
Women's tumbling	Candy Brière-Vetillard; France	Miah Bruns; United States	Breanah Cauchi; Australia

== Tug of war ==
Event	Gold	Silver	Bronze
Men's outdoor 640 kg	Switzerland; Martin Arnold; Thomas Arnold; Walter Bernhard; Robin Burch; Ueli Christen; Samuel Gräni; Ruedi Odermatt; Fabian Rölli; Emanuel Zumbühl; Johannes Zumbühl	Great Britain; Marshall Drew; Daniel Kenny; William Lee; Ian Murphy; Tony Peck; Andy Rebori; Ian Robinson; Lee Robinson; Peter Sellars; Aidan Wheeler	Belgium; Wim Broeckx; Wim De Schutter; Jan Hendrickx; Joeri Janssens; Luc Mertens; Raf Mertens; Wouter Raeymaekers; Johny Schuermans; Ief Smets; Dries Vermeiren; Joris Vermeiren
Women's outdoor 540 kg	Chinese Taipei; Gu Tsai-rong; Huang Yu-an; Lai Ting-yu; Li Ju-chun; Lin Meng-zhu; Shih Chih-hsin; Tien Chia-hsin; Tien Chia-jung; Tung Han	Sweden; Jennie Andersson; Johanna Eriksson; Frida Hed; Karin Jacobson; Ellen Lilja; Lina Lindquist Olsson; Magdalena Persson; Sofia Persson; Hanna Westerling	Switzerland; Stéphanie Arnet; Elena Beier; Petra Käslin; Michaela Koch; Stefanie Ott; Jasmin Villiger; Melanie Villiger; Sarah Villiger; Brigitte Ziegler; Erika Zumbühl
Mixed outdoor 580 kg	Great Britain; Richard Keightley; Daniel Kenny; William Lee; Ian Robinson; Lee Robinson; Aidan Wheeler; Tara Adams; Lucie Gray; Emma Stone; Charlotte Williams	Germany; Lukas Maier; Lorenz Mühl; Florian Resch; Rainer Vogel; Thomas Wegmann; Fabien Elias; Julia Frieß; Ramona Mühl; Nicole Pflüger	Netherlands; Robert Bentsink; Ruud Geerdes; Gerben Jansen; Jan Klumpers; Arjan Oude Nijhuis; Aloysius Ribberink; Jolanda Klumpers; Nanda Oude Egberink; Annieta Nieuwland; Trude Zonneveld

== Water skiing ==
Event	Gold	Silver	Bronze
Men's jump	Danylo Filchenko; Ukraine	Taylor Garcia; United States	Tobías Giorgis; Argentina
Men's slalom	Nate Smith; United States	Brando Caruso; Italy	Cole McCormick; Canada
Men's tricks	Adam Pickos; United States	Danylo Filchenko; Ukraine	Pierre Ballon; France
Men's wakeboarding	Nic Rapa; Australia	Stefano Comollo; Italy	Maxime Roux; France
Women's jump	Lauren Morgan; United States	Taryn Grant; Canada	Valentina González; Chile
Women's slalom	Regina Jaquess; United States	Jaimee Bull; Canada	Geena Krüger; Germany
Women's tricks	Neilly Ross; Canada	Anna Gay; United States	Aaliyah Yoong; Malaysia
Women's wakeboarding	Hinata Yoshihara; Japan	Eugenia De Armas; Argentina	Taylor McCullough; United States

== Wheelchair rugby ==
Event	Gold	Silver	Bronze
Mixed	Great Britain; Myles Pearson; Sam Dickinson; Kylie Grimes; Nick Cummins; Ryan Cowling; Luke Wilson; Dan Kellett	Japan; Hidefumi Wakayama; Yuki Hasegawa; Kae Kurahashi; Tomoaki Imai; Kotaro Kishi; Takayuki Norimatsu; Seiya Norimatsu; Hitoshi Ogawa	Germany; Peter Schreiner; Christian Riedel; Britta Kripke; Thomas Schuwje; Robert Teichmann; Florian Bongard; Niklas Braschoß

== Wushu ==
Event	Gold	Silver	Bronze
Men's changquan	Edgar Xavier Marvelo; Indonesia	Lee Ha-sung; South Korea	Roman Reva; Ukraine
Men's nanquan & nangun	Liu Zhongxin; China	Harris Horatius; Indonesia	Lai Po-wei; Chinese Taipei
Men's taijiquan & taijijian	Yu Won-hee; South Korea	Hosea Wong; Brunei	Yeung Chung Hei; Hong Kong
Men's daoshu & gunshu	Wu Zhaohua; China	Jowen Lim; Singapore	Loan Drouard; France
Men's jianshu & qiangshu	Brian Wang; United States	Alfonso Barbarisi; Italy	Jason Chen-Leung; Canada
Women's changquan	Lai Xiaoxiao; China	Nandhira Mauriskha; Indonesia	Michele Santos; Brazil
Women's nanquan & nandao	Zhang Yaling; China	Darya Latisheva; Uzbekistan	Lee Wing Yung; Hong Kong
Women's taijiquan & taijijian	Basma Lachkar; Brunei	Liu Pei-hsun; Chinese Taipei	Vera Tan; Singapore
Women's daoshu & gunshu	Mia Tian; United States	Alina Krysko; Ukraine	Michelle Yeung; Hong Kong
Women's jianshu & qiangshu	Dương Thúy Vi; Vietnam	Winnie Cai; Canada	Seo Hee-ju; South Korea
