= Sport climbing at the 2022 World Games – Men's speed =

Sport climbing – Men's speed at the 2022 World Games
- Venue: Sloss Furnaces, Birmingham, United States
- Dates: 14 July
- Competitors: 12 from 8 nations

Medalists
gold medal	Veddriq Leonardo	Indonesia
silver medal	Kiromal Katibin	Indonesia
bronze medal	Yaroslav Tkach	Ukraine

The men's speed competition in sport climbing at the 2022 World Games took place on 14 July 2022 at the Sloss Furnaces in Birmingham, United States.

== Competition format ==
A total of 12 athletes entered the competition. In qualification every athlete has 2 runs, best time counts. Top 8 climbers qualify to main competition.

== Results ==
=== Qualification ===
Rank	Athlete	Nation	Lane A	Lane B	Best	Note
1	Kiromal Katibin	Indonesia	6.42	5.27	5.27	Q
2	Veddriq Leonardo	Indonesia	5.28	5.30	5.28	Q
3	John Brosler	United States	7.02	5.43	5.43	Q
4	Yaroslav Tkach	Ukraine	5.56	5.80	5.56	Q
5	Danyil Boldyrev	Ukraine	5.78	5.660	5.660	Q
6	Rishat Khaibullin	Kazakhstan	5.666	5.94	5.666	Q
7	Marcin Dzieński	Poland	5.79	6.06	5.79	Q
8	Guillaume Moro	France	5.81	5.85	5.81	Q
9	Noah Bratschi	United States	6.69	6.11	6.11	
10	Lawrence Bogeschdorfer	Austria	8.13	6.27	6.27	
11	Christopher Cosser	South Africa	10.39	6.78	6.78	
12	Tobias Plangger	Austria	8.53	10.40	8.53	

=== Competition bracket ===
Quarterfinals
1 Kiromal Katibin (INA)	5.27
8 Guillaume Moro (FRA)	5.60
4 Yaroslav Tkach (UKR)	5.76
5 Danyil Boldyrev (UKR)	5.82
2 Veddriq Leonardo (INA)	5.31
7 Marcin Dzieński (POL)	5.92
3 John Brosler (USA)	5.92
6 Rishat Khaibullin (KAZ)	5.61

Semifinals
1 Kiromal Katibin (INA)	5.45
4 Yaroslav Tkach (UKR)	6.27
2 Veddriq Leonardo (INA)	5.25
6 Rishat Khaibullin (KAZ)	5.39

Gold medal
1 Kiromal Katibin (INA)	Fall
2 Veddriq Leonardo (INA)	7.23
Bronze medal
4 Yaroslav Tkach (UKR)	5.56
6 Rishat Khaibullin (KAZ)	5.60
