= Sport climbing at the 2022 World Games =

Competition climbing event

- Venue: Sloss Furnaces
- Dates: 14–16 July
- No. of events: 6

Competition climbing at the 2022 World Games took place from 14 to 16 July 2022, at the Sloss Furnaces, Birmingham, United States. Originally scheduled to take place in July 2021, the Games were rescheduled for July 2022 as a result of the 2020 Summer Olympics postponement due to the COVID-19 pandemic. It served as a qualifying event for the 2024 Summer Olympics in Paris, France.

== Qualification ==
Athletes qualified for the World Games through their placement in various international and continental championships held in 2020 and 2021 in the disciplines of competition lead climbing, competition bouldering, and competition speed climbing. If a quota for a particular event is not used, then it is allocated to the next eligible athlete in the same event.

| Standard | Lead | | Speed | | Boulder | |
| Standard | Male | Female | Male | Female | Male | Female |
|---|---|---|---|---|---|---|
1. International quota
| 2021 World Championships | 1 | 1 | 1 | 1 | 1 | 1 |
| 2021 World Cup rankings | 3 | 3 | 3 | 3 | 3 | 3 |
| World Youth Junior | 1 | 1 | 1 | 1 | 1 | 1 |
| World Youth A | 1 | 1 | 1 | 1 | 1 | 1 |
2. Continental quota
| 2021 Asian Championships | 1 | 1 | 1 | 1 | 1 | 1 |
| 2021 African Championships | 1 | 1 | 1 | 1 | 1 | 1 |
| 2020 European Championships | 1 | 1 | 1 | 1 | 1 | 1 |
| 2021 Oceanian Championships | 1 | 1 | 1 | 1 | 1 | 1 |
| 2021 Pan American Championships | 1 | 1 | 1 | 1 | 1 | 1 |
3. Host nation quota
| United States | 1 | 1 | 1 | 1 | 1 | 1 |
| Subtotals | 12 | 12 | 12 | 12 | 12 | 12 |
| Total | 72 | | | | | |

== Participating nations ==
59 climbers from 17 nations participated.

- Australia (1)
- Austria (6)
- Belgium (3)
- Chile (2)
- Ecuador (1)
- France (7)
- Germany (2)
- Indonesia (2)
- Israel (2)
- Japan (7)
- Kazakhstan (2)
- Poland (3)
- Slovenia (5)
- South Africa (3)
- Switzerland (2)
- Ukraine (4)
- United States (7)

== Medal table ==
* Host nation (United States)

| Rank | Nation | Gold | Silver | Bronze | Total |
|---|---|---|---|---|---|
| 1 | Japan | 1 | 3 | 2 | 6 |
| 2 | Indonesia | 1 | 1 | 0 | 2 |
| 3 | Austria | 1 | 0 | 0 | 1 |
| 3 | Belgium | 1 | 0 | 0 | 1 |
| 3 | Switzerland | 1 | 0 | 0 | 1 |
| 3 | United States* | 1 | 0 | 0 | 1 |
| 7 | Slovenia | 0 | 1 | 1 | 2 |
| 8 | Poland | 0 | 1 | 0 | 1 |
| 9 | France | 0 | 0 | 1 | 1 |
| 9 | Germany | 0 | 0 | 1 | 1 |
| 9 | Ukraine | 0 | 0 | 1 | 1 |
| Totals (11 entries) | | 6 | 6 | 6 | 18 |

== Events ==
=== Men ===
| Event | Gold | Silver | Bronze |
|---|---|---|---|
| Boulder | Nicolas Collin (BEL) | Kokoro Fujii (JPN) | Yoshiyuki Ogata (JPN) |
| Speed | Veddriq Leonardo (INA) | Kiromal Katibin (INA) | Yaroslav Tkach (UKR) |
| Lead | Sascha Lehmann (SUI) | Masahiro Higuchi (JPN) | Mejdi Schalck (FRA) |

=== Women ===
| Event | Gold | Silver | Bronze |
|---|---|---|---|
| Boulder | Miho Nonaka (JPN) | Katja Debevec (SLO) | Mao Nakamura (JPN) |
| Speed | Emma Hunt (USA) | Natalia Kałucka (POL) | Franziska Ritter (GER) |
| Lead | Jessica Pilz (AUT) | Natsuki Tanii (JPN) | Lana Skušek (SLO) |
