= Wushu at the 2022 World Games =

- Venue: Bill Battle Coliseum, Birmingham–Southern College
- Dates: July 12–13, 2022
- No. of events: 10
- Competitors: from 24 nations

The wushu (taolu) competition at the 2022 World Games took place in July 2022, in Birmingham, Alabama, at the Bill Battle Coliseum. Originally scheduled to take place in July 2021, the Games were rescheduled for July 2022 as a result of the 2020 Summer Olympics postponement due to the COVID-19 pandemic.

Wushu featured as a sport selected by the host organizing committee, alongside duathlon, flag football, men's lacrosse, and wheelchair rugby. Wushu had been an invitational sport at the World Games in 2009 and 2013. In May 2021, the International Wushu Federation was admitted into the International World Games Association, and wushu will again be an official event in the 2025 World Games. José Perurena, IWGA President, stated, "In Birmingham [2022], for the first time, invitational sports were no longer presented separately but were also part of the official programme."

== Qualification ==
Qualification was done according to the results of the 2019 World Wushu Championships in Shanghai. This is a taolu exclusive competition and so no sanda events took place compared to previous renditions. There were five events for male and female athletes which included: changquan, daoshu/gunshu combined, jianshu/qiangshu combined, nanquan/nangun combined (for men), nanquan/nandao combined (for women), and taijiquan/taijijian combined. The qualification list was later revised in February 2022 due to Macau's IOC ineligibility to compete and the start of the Russian invasion of Ukraine, and thus eight new spots were opened.

== Participating nations ==
- Argentina (1)
- Brazil (2)
- Brunei (2)
- China (4)
- Canada (4)
- Egypt (1)
- France (3)
- Great Britain (1)
- Hong Kong (4)
- Indonesia (4)
- India (1)
- Iran (4)
- Italy (1)
- South Korea (4)
- Mexico (2)
- Nepal (2)
- Senegal (1)
- Singapore (4)
- Thailand (1)
- Chinese Taipei (4)
- Ukraine (3)
- United States (4)
- Uzbekistan (1)
- Vietnam (3)

== Medal table ==
* Host nation (United States)

Rank	Nation	Gold	Silver	Bronze	Total
1	China	4	0	0	4
2	United States*	2	0	0	2
3	Indonesia	1	2	0	3
4	South Korea	1	1	1	3
5	Brunei	1	1	0	2
6	Vietnam	1	0	0	1
7	Canada	0	1	1	2
7	Chinese Taipei	0	1	1	2
7	Singapore	0	1	1	2
7	Ukraine	0	1	1	2
11	Italy	0	1	0	1
11	Uzbekistan	0	1	0	1
13	Hong Kong	0	0	3	3
14	Brazil	0	0	1	1
14	France	0	0	1	1
Totals (15 entries)		10	10	10	30

== Events ==
=== Men ===
Event	Gold	Silver	Bronze
Changquan	Edgar Xavier Marvelo; Indonesia	Lee Ha-sung; South Korea	Roman Reva; Ukraine
Daoshu / Gunshu	Wu Zhaohua; China	Jowen Lim; Singapore	Loan Drouard; France
Jianshu / Qiangshu	Brian Wang; United States	Barbarisi Alfonso; Italy	Jason Chen-Leung; Canada
Nanquan / Nangun	Liu Zhongxin; China	Harris Horatius; Indonesia	Lai Po-Wei; Chinese Taipei
Taijiquan / Taijijian	Yu Won-Hee; South Korea	Hosea Wong Zheng Yu; Brunei	Yeung Chung Hei; Hong Kong

=== Women ===
Event	Gold	Silver	Bronze
Changquan	Lai Xiaoxiao; China	Nandhira Mauriskha; Indonesia	Michele Santos; Brazil
Daoshu / Gunshu	Mia Tian; United States	Alina Krysko; Ukraine	Michelle Yeung; Hong Kong
Jianshu / Qiangshu	Dương Thúy Vi; Vietnam	Winnie Cai; Canada	Seo Hee-ju; South Korea
Nanquan / Nandao	Zhang Yaling; China	Darya Latisheva; Uzbekistan	Lee Wing Yung; Hong Kong
Taijiquan / Taijijian	Basma Lachkar; Brunei	Liu Pei-Hsun; Chinese Taipei	Vera Tan Yan Ning; Singapore

== Results ==
=== Men's changquan ===
Rank	Athlete	Score
1	Edgar Xavier Marvelo (INA)	9.553
2	Lee Ha-sung (KOR)	9.503
3	Roman Reva (UKR)	9.253
4	Alex Ni (USA)	9.013
5	Dante Gamboa (MEX)	DNS
6	Jesse Adalia (SIN)	DNS

=== Men's daoshu & gunshu combined ===
Rank	Athlete	Daoshu	Gunshu	Total
1	Wu Zhaohua (CHN)	9.627	9.657	19.284
2	Jowen Lim (SIN)	9.520	9.564	19.084
3	Loan Drouard (FRA)	9.313	9.500	18.813
4	Amr Kasem Kasem (EGY)	9.457	9.130	18.587
5	Chen-Ming Wang (TPE)	9.133	9.453	18.586
6	Giordano Domenico (ITA)	9.107	9.340	18.447

=== Men's jianshu & qiangshu combined ===
Rank	Athlete	Jianshu	Qiangshu	Total
1	Brian Wang (USA)	9.523	9.503	19.026
2	Barbarisi Alfonso (ITA)	9.467	9.463	18.930
3	Jason Chen-Leung (CAN)	9.430	9.300	18.730
4	Samuel Mak (GBR)	9.240	9.443	18.683
5	Benoit Denolle (FRA)	8.933	8.827	17.760
6	Benjamin Muller (SUI)	8.390	8.693	17.083

=== Men's nanquan & nangun combined ===
Rank	Athlete	Nanquan	Nangun	Total
1	Liu Zhongxin (CHN)	9.567	9.567	19.134
2	Harris Horatius (INA)	9.510	9.520	19.030
3	Lai Po-Wei (TPE)	9.503	9.513	19.016
4	Phạm Quốc Khánh (VIE)	9.477	9.470	18.947
5	Ngan Lok Man (HKG)	8.717	8.720	17.437
6	Ousmanne Gueye (SEN)	7.637	7.837	15.474
7	Hamal Deepak (NEP)	DNS	DNS	

=== Men's taijiquan & taijijian combined ===
Rank	Athlete	Taijiquan	Taijijian	Total
1	Yu Won-Hee (KOR)	9.427	9.553	18.980
2	Zheng Yu Hosea Wong (BRU)	9.487	9.437	18.924
3	Yeung Chung Hei (HKG)	9.253	9.650	18.903
4	Brahmna Sanma (IND)	9.133	9.047	18.180
5	Murray Cheung (CAN)	9.023	8.917	17.940
6	Jo Saelee (THA)	DNS	DNS	

=== Women's changquan ===
Rank	Athlete	Score
1	Lai Xiaoxiao (CHN)	9.587
2	Nandhira Mauriskha (INA)	9.483
3	Michele Santos (BRA)	9.387
4	Lissy Liu (CAN)	9.237
5	Juliette Vauchez (FRA)	9.163
6	Melina Fiorela Arevalo (ARG)	8.900

=== Women's daoshu & gunshu combined ===
Rank	Athlete	Gunshu	Daoshu	Total
1	Mia Tian (USA)	9.303	9.487	18.790
2	Alina Krysko (UKR)	9.373	9.293	18.666
3	Michelle Yeung (HKG)	9.220	9.360	18.580
4	Alexa Cruz (MEX)	8.997	9.270	18.267
5	Camila Cid Urtubia (CHI)	8.707	8.050	16.757
6	Hoàng Thị Phương Giang (VIE)	DNS	DNS	

=== Women's jianshu & qiangshu combined ===
Rank	Athlete	Jianshu	Qiangshu	Total
1	Dương Thúy Vi (VIE)	9.513	9.527	19.040
2	Winnie Cai (CAN)	9.190	9.150	18.340
3	Seo Hee-ju (KOR)	9.320	9.000	18.320
4	Yana Poltoratska (UKR)	9.060	9.120	18.180
5	Anastasia Chirliuc (ISR)	8.423	9.730	18.153
6	Isabel Xin Ting Chua (SIN)	DNS	DNS	

=== Women's nanquan & nandao combined ===
Rank	Athlete	Nanquan	Nangun	Total
1	Zhang Yaling (CHN)	9.570	9.583	19.153
2	Darya Latisheva (UZB)	9.293	9.423	18.716
3	Lee Wing Yung (HKG)	8.977	9.117	18.094
4	Nima Gharti Magar (NEP)	DNS	DNS	

=== Women's taijiquan & taijijian combined ===
Rank	Athlete	Taijiquan	Taijijian	Total
1	Basma Lachkar (BRU)	9.517	9.523	19.040
2	Liu Pei-Hsun (TPE)	9.500	9.513	19.013
3	Vera Yan Ning Tan (SIN)	9.477	9.470	18.947
4	Choi Yujeong (KOR)	9.373	9.403	18.776
5	Alisya Mellynar (INA)	9.360	9.343	18.603
6	Judy Liu (USA)	DNS	DNS	
