= Indonesia at the 2022 World Games =

- IOC code: INA
- NOC: Indonesian Olympic Committee

in Birmingham, United States 7 July 2022 – 17 July 2022
- Competitors: 6 (4 men and 2 women) in 2 sports
- Medals Ranked 25th: Gold 2 Silver 3 Bronze 0 Total 5

World Games appearances (overview)
- 1981; 1985; 1989; 1993; 1997; 2001; 2005; 2009; 2013; 2017; 2022; 2025

Indonesia competed in the 2022 World Games in Birmingham, United States, from 7 to 17 July 2022. The games were originally scheduled for July 2021, but were postponed due to the rescheduling of the Tokyo 2020 Olympic Games. Athletes representing Indonesia won two gold medals and three silver medals. The country finished in 25th place in the medal table.

== Competitors ==
The following is the list of number of competitors in the Games.

Sport	Men	Women	Total
Sport climbing	2	0	2
Wushu	2	2	4
Total	4	2	6

== Medalists ==
Medal	Name	Sport	Event	Date
Gold	Edgar Xavier Marvelo	Wushu	Men's changquan	12 July
Gold	Veddriq Leonardo	Sport climbing	Speed	14 July
Silver	Harris Horatius	Wushu	Men's nanquan and nangun	13 July
Silver	Nandhira Mauriskha	Wushu	Women's chanquan	13 July
Silver	Kiromal Katibin	Sport climbing	Speed	14 July

== Sport climbing ==
Indonesia entered two climbers into the world games competition. Veddriq Leonardo and Kiromal Katibin secured their place after being in the top three of the 2021 World Cup ranking.

Speed

Athlete	Event	Qualification		Quarterfinals	Semifinals	Final / BM	
Athlete	Event	Time	Rank	Opposition Result	Opposition Result	Opposition Result	Rank
Veddriq Leonardo	Men's	5.286	2	(Poland) Marcin Dzieński; W 5.31 - 5.92	(Kazakhstan) Rishat Khaibullin; W 5.25 - 5.39	(Indonesia) Kiromal Katibin; W 7.23 - Fall	1st place, gold medalist(s)
Kiromal Katibin	Men's	5.277	1	(France) Guillaume Moro; W 5.27 - 5.60	(Ukraine) Yaroslav Tkach; W 5.45 - 6.27	(Indonesia) Veddriq Leonardo; L Fall - 7.23	2nd place, silver medalist(s)

== Wushu ==
Indonesia qualified four athletes into this tournament. 2019 world championship and 2019 Southeast Asian Games gold medalist Edgar Xavier Marvelo and Harris Horatius will compete with Nandhira Mauriskha and Alisya Mellynar.

Athlete	Event	Qualifying		Final	
Athlete	Event	Result	Rank	Result	Rank
Edgar Xavier Marvelo	Men's changquan	N/A		9.533	1st place, gold medalist(s)
Harris Horatius	Men's nanquan and nangun	9.510	2	19.030	2nd place, silver medalist(s)
Nandhira Mauriskha	Women's changquan	N/A		9.483	2nd place, silver medalist(s)
Alisya Mellynar	Women's taijiquan and taijijian	9.260	5	18.603	5

== See also ==
- 2022 World Games
