= Vietnam at the 2022 World Games =

- IOC code: VIE
- NOC: Vietnam Olympic Committee
- Website: www.voc.org.vn (in Vietnamese and English)

in Birmingham, U.S.
- Competitors: 5 in 3 sports
- Medals Ranked 31st: Gold 2 Silver 0 Bronze 0 Total 2

World Games appearances
- 1981; 1985; 1989; 1993; 1997; 2001; 2005; 2009; 2013; 2017; 2022

Vietnam competed in the 2022 World Games in Birmingham, United States, from 7 to 17 July 2022. The games were originally scheduled for July 2021, but were postponed due to the rescheduling of the Tokyo 2020 Olympic Games. Athletes representing Vietnam won two gold medals and the country finished in 31st place in the medal table.

== Medalists ==
Medal	Name	Sport	Event	Date
Gold	Nguyễn Trần Duy Nhất	Muaythai	Men's 57 kg	17 July

=== Invitational sports ===
Medal	Name	Sport	Event	Date
Gold	Dương Thúy Vi	Wushu	Women's jianshu and qiangshu	12 July

== Competitors ==
The following is the list of number of competitors in the Games.

Sport	Men	Women	Total
Billiards sports	1	0	1
Muay Thai	1	0	1
Wushu	1	2	3
Total	3	2	5

== Billiards sports ==
Vietnam qualified one athlete to compete at the games.

Athlete	Event	Round of 16	Quarterfinal	Semifinal	Final / BM	
Athlete	Event	Opposition Result	Opposition Result	Opposition Result	Opposition Result	Rank
Trần Quyết Chiến	Men's 3-cushion carom	Teran (ECU); W 40–19	Garcia (COL); L 26–40	Did not advance		

== Muay Thai ==
Vietnam entered one athlete into the muaythai competition at the World Games. Bùi Yến Ly has also secured her place in the women's 54 kg event, but she didn't participate.

Athlete	Event	Quarterfinals	Semifinals	Final / BM	
Athlete	Event	Opposition Result	Opposition Result	Opposition Result	Rank
Nguyễn Trần Duy Nhất	Men's 57 kg	Botelho (POR); W 30–27	Mykytas (UKR); W 29–28	Sarsembekov (KAZ); W 29–28	1st place, gold medalist(s)

== Wushu ==
Vietnam qualified three athletes into this tournament. 2019 world championship silver and bronze medalist Dương Thúy Vi and Hoàng Thị Phương Giang competed with Phạm Quốc Khánh, the 2019 Southeast Asian Games gold medalist.

Athlete	Event	First routine		Second routine		Final score	
Athlete	Event	Result	Rank	Result	Rank	Result	Rank
Phạm Quốc Khánh	Men's nanquan and nangun	9.477	4	9.470	4	18.947	4
Hoàng Thị Phương Giang	Women's daoshu and gunshu	DNS					6
Dương Thúy Vi	Women's jianshu and qiangshu	9.513	1	9.527	1	19.040	1st place, gold medalist(s)
