= Hong Kong at the 2022 World Games =

- IOC code: HKG
- NOC: Sports Federation and Olympic Committee of Hong Kong, China

in Birmingham, United States 7 July 2022 – 17 July 2022
- Competitors: 17 (6 men and 11 women) in 8 sports
- Medals Ranked 43rd: Gold 1 Silver 0 Bronze 4 Total 5

World Games appearances
- 1981; 1985; 1989; 1993; 1997; 2001; 2005; 2009; 2013; 2017; 2022; 2025

Hong Kong competed at the 2022 World Games held in Birmingham, United States from 7 to 17 July 2022. Athletes representing Hong Kong won one gold medal and four bronze medals. The country finished in 43rd place in the medal table.

== Medalists ==
| Medal | Name | Sport | Event | Date |
|---|---|---|---|---|
| Gold | Cheung Ka Wai | Cue sports | Men's snooker | 17 July |
| Bronze | Grace Lau | Karate | Women's kata | 8 July |

=== Invitational sports ===
| Medal | Name | Sport | Event | Date |
|---|---|---|---|---|
| Bronze | Yeung Chung Hei | Wushu | Men's taijiquan & taijijian | 13 July |
| Bronze | Lee Wing Yung | Wushu | Women's nanquan & nandao | 13 July |
| Bronze | Michelle Yeung | Wushu | Women's daoshu & gunshu | 13 July |

== Competitors ==
The following list specifies the number of competitors for Hong Kong in each sport.

| Sport | Men | Women | Total |
|---|---|---|---|
| Air sports | 0 | 1 | 1 |
| Billiards sports | 1 | 0 | 1 |
| Karate | 0 | 1 | 1 |
| Muaythai | 0 | 1 | 1 |
| Orienteering | 2 | 2 | 4 |
| Road speed skating Track speed skating | 0 | 2 | 2 |
| Squash | 1 | 2 | 3 |
| Wushu | 2 | 2 | 4 |
| Total | 6 | 11 | 17 |

== Air sports ==
Hong Kong competed in drone racing.

Drone racing

| Athlete | Event | Qualification | | Round of 32 | | Round of 16 | | Quarterfinal | | Semifinal | | Repechage 1 | | Repechage 2 | | Repechage 3 | | Repechage 4 | | Repechage quarterfinal | | Repechage semifinal | | Final | | | |
| Athlete | Event | Time | Rank | Time | Rank | Time | Rank | Time | Rank | Time | Rank | Time | Rank | Time | Rank | Time | Rank | Time | Rank | Time | Rank | Time | Rank | Time | Rank | Time | Rank |
|---|---|---|---|---|---|---|---|---|---|---|---|---|---|---|---|---|---|---|---|---|---|---|---|---|---|---|---|
| Lai Ka Ki | Drone racing | 40.100523 | 30 | DNF | 3 R | Did not advance | | | | | | DNF | 4 | Did not advance | | | | | | | | | | | | | 30 |

== Cue sports ==
Hong Kong won one gold medal in cue sports.

| Athlete | Event | Round of 16 | Quarterfinal | Semifinal | Final / BM | |
| Athlete | Event | Opposition Score | Opposition Score | Opposition Score | Opposition Score | Rank |
|---|---|---|---|---|---|---|
| Cheung Ka Wai | Men's snooker | Brown (GBR); W 3–0 | Ramzan (PAK); W 3–1 | Al-Obaidli (BHR); W 3–0 | Shahin (EGY); W 3–1 | 1st place, gold medalist(s) |

== Karate ==
Hong Kong won one bronze medal in karate.

| Athlete | Event | Elimination round | | | | Semifinal | Final / BM | |
| Athlete | Event | Opposition Result | Opposition Result | Opposition Result | Rank | Opposition Result | Opposition Result | Rank |
|---|---|---|---|---|---|---|---|---|
| Grace Lau | Women's kata | Kokumai (USA); W 24.94–24.32 | Ismail (EGY); W 24.68–24.54 | Ono (JPN); L 25.06–25.52 | 2 Q | Sánchez (ESP); L 25.66–26.92 | Casale (ITA); W 26.28–25.54 | 3rd place, bronze medalist(s) |

== Muaythai ==
Hong Kong competed in muaythai.

| Athlete | Event | Quarterfinal | Semifinal | Final / BM | |
| Athlete | Event | Opposition Result | Opposition Result | Opposition Result | Rank |
|---|---|---|---|---|---|
| Alex Tsang | –57 kg | Bye | Brandt (USA); L 27–30 | Bronze medal final Axling (SWE); L 17–20 | 4 |

== Orienteering ==
Hong Kong competed in orienteering.

Men

| Athlete | Event | Time | Rank |
|---|---|---|---|
| Li Chun Ho | Men's sprint | 19:09.00 | 37 |
| Yu Tsz Wai | Men's sprint | 18:51.00 | 35 |
| Li Chun Ho | Men's middle distance | 1:00:17.00 | 34 |
| Yu Tsz Wai | Men's middle distance | 58:52.00 | 32 |

Women

| Athlete | Event | Time | Rank |
|---|---|---|---|
| Lam Cho Yu | Women's sprint | 19:20.00 | 26 |
| Leung Ka Ki | Women's sprint | 20:24.00 | 30 |
| Lam Cho Yu | Women's middle distance | 1:03:26.00 | 28 |
| Leung Ka Ki | Women's middle distance | 1:08:16.00 | 29 |

Mixed

| Athlete | Event | Time | Rank |
|---|---|---|---|
| Li Chun Ho; Yu Tsz Wai; Lam Cho Yu; Leung Ka Ki | Mixed team relay | 59:17.00 | 12 |

== Roller skating ==
=== Road ===
Hong Kong competed in road speed skating.

| Athlete | Event | Heat | | Quarterfinal | | Semifinal | | Final | |
| Athlete | Event | Time | Rank | Time | Rank | Time | Rank | Result | Rank |
|---|---|---|---|---|---|---|---|---|---|
| Karinne Tsz Ching Tam | Women's 100 m | 11.861 | 2 | Did not advance | | | | | 12 |
| Karinne Tsz Ching Tam | Women's 1 lap | 1:18.98 | 3 | —N/a | | Did not advance | | | 12 |
| Vanessa Natalie Wong | Women's 10,000 m point race | —N/a | | | | | | DNF | |
| Vanessa Natalie Wong | Women's 15,000 m elimination race | —N/a | | | | | | EL | 15 |

=== Track ===
Hong Kong competed in track speed skating.

| Athlete | Event | Qualification | | Heat | | Semifinal | | Final | |
| Athlete | Event | Time | Rank | Time | Rank | Time | Rank | Result | Rank |
|---|---|---|---|---|---|---|---|---|---|
| Karinne Tsz Ching Tam | 200 m time trial | 20.813 | 14 | —N/a | | | | Did not advance | 14 |
| Karinne Tsz Ching Tam | 500 m sprint | —N/a | | 49.324 | 4 | Did not advance | | | 14 |
| Karinne Tsz Ching Tam | 1000 m sprint | —N/a | | 1:37.420 | 6 | Did not advance | | | 25 |
| Vanessa Natalie Wong | 1000 m sprint | —N/a | | 1:33.128 | 5 | Did not advance | | | 20 |
| Vanessa Natalie Wong | 10,000 elimination race | —N/a | | | | | | EL | 14 |
| Vanessa Natalie Wong | 10,000 m points race | —N/a | | | | | | DNF | |

== Squash ==
Hong Kong competed in squash.

| Athlete | Event | Round of 32 | Round of 16 / CR | Quarterfinal / CQ | Semifinal / CS | Final / BM / CF | |
| Athlete | Event | Opposition Result | Opposition Result | Opposition Result | Opposition Result | Opposition Result | Rank |
|---|---|---|---|---|---|---|---|
| Lam Yat Ting | Men's singles | Wilhelmi (SUI); L 11–9, 10–12, 3–11 | Did not advance | Classification round Omlor (GER); L 7–11, 11–2, 3–11 | Did not advance | | =17 |

== Wushu ==
Hong Kong won three medals in wushu.

| Athlete | Event | Apparatus 1 | | Apparatus 2 | | Total | |
| Athlete | Event | Score | Rank | Score | Rank | Score | Rank |
|---|---|---|---|---|---|---|---|
| Ngan Lok Man | Men's nanquan / nangun | 8.717 | 5 | 8.720 | 5 | 17.437 | 5 |
| Yeung Chung Hei | Men's taijiquan / taijijian | 9.253 | 3 | 9.650 | 1 | 18.903 | 3rd place, bronze medalist(s) |
| Michelle Yeung | Women's daoshu / gunshu | 9.220 | 3 | 9.360 | 2 | 18.580 | 3rd place, bronze medalist(s) |
| Lee Wing Yung | Women's nanquan / nandao | 8.977 | 3 | 9.117 | 3 | 18.094 | 3rd place, bronze medalist(s) |
