= Avondale Park Historic District =

Historic district in Alabama, United States

- U.S. National Register of Historic Places
- U.S. Historic district
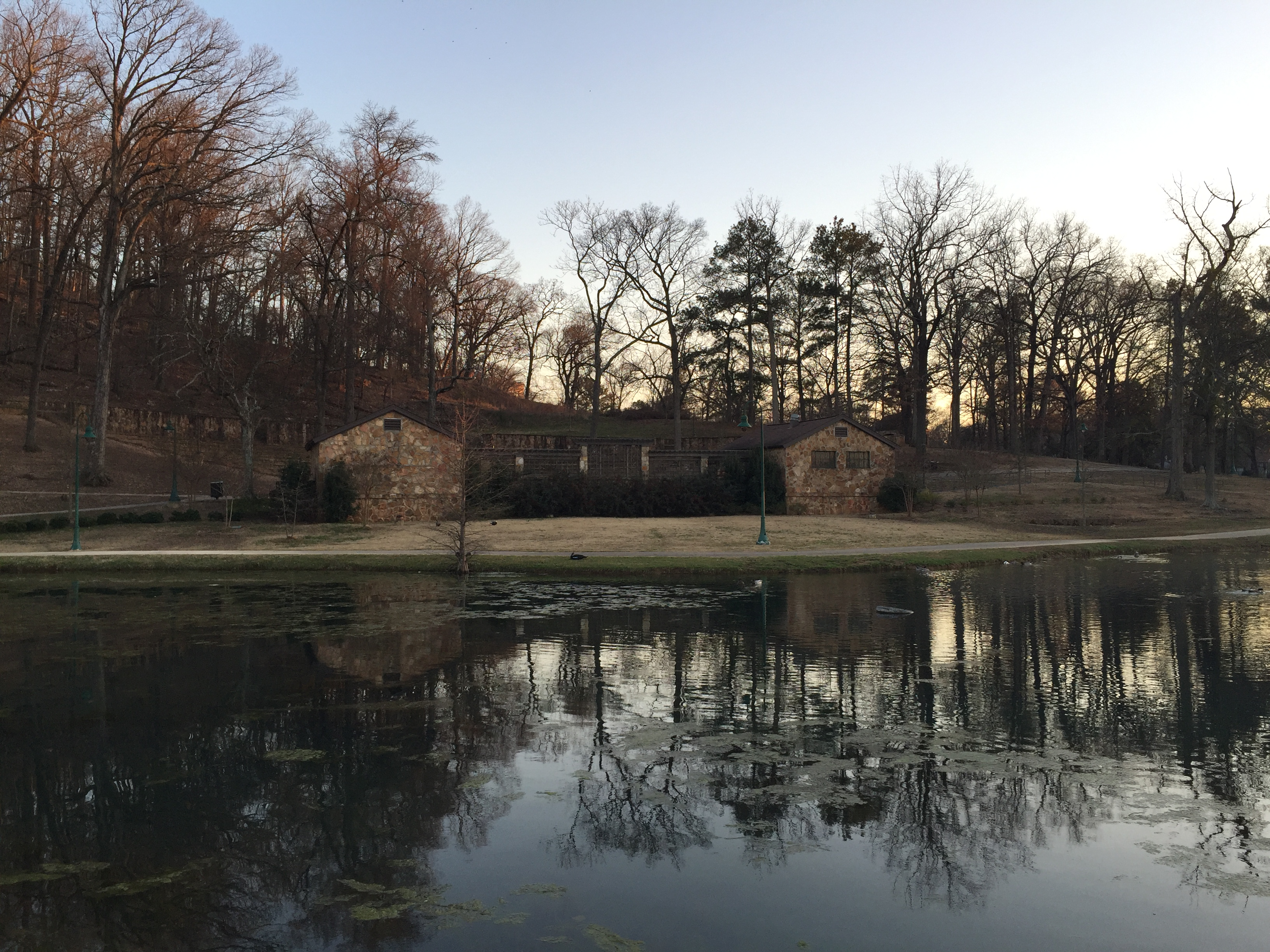
- Pond at Avondale Park

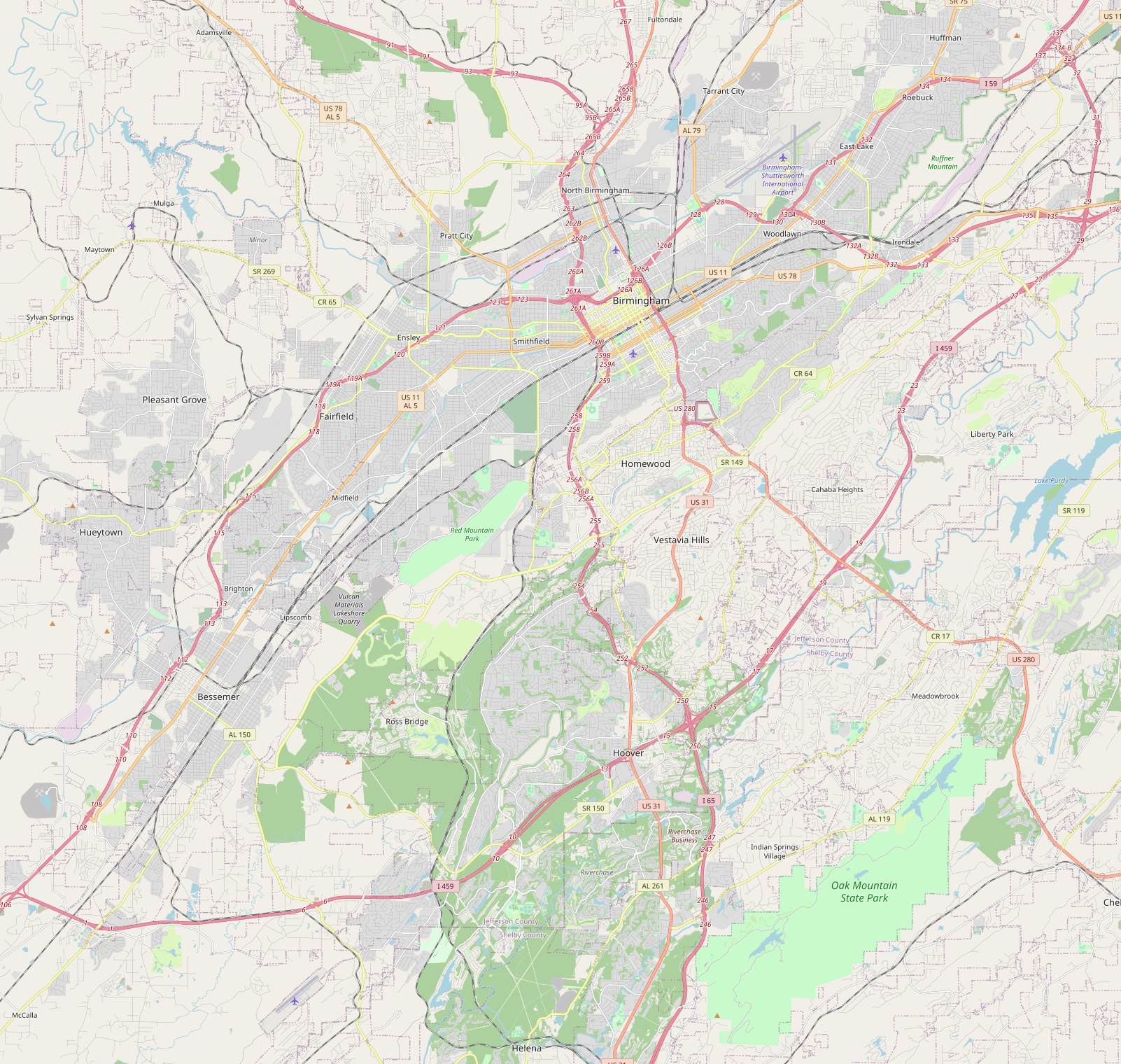
- Location within Birmingham, Alabama Location within Alabama Location within the United States
- Location: Roughly bounded by 47th st., 7th Ave., 8th Court, 34th St., and AL 4, Birmingham, Alabama
- Coordinates: 33.52214°N 86.77122°W
- Area: 200 acres (81 ha)
- Built: 1886
- Architect: Burnhum & Greer
- Architectural style: Queen Anne, Colonial Revival, Tudor Revival
- NRHP reference No.: 98000106
- Added to NRHP: February 20, 1998

The Avondale Park Historic District in Birmingham, Alabama, United States, is a 200-acre (81 ha) historic district that was listed on the National Register of Historic Places in 1998. It is in the Avondale section of the city. It includes work dating to 1886 and work by Burnhum & Greer. It includes Queen Anne, Colonial Revival, and Tudor Revival architecture. The listing included 425 contributing buildings, one contributing site, and two contributing structures.

At least four of the contributing buildings are houses of worship including Avondale United Methodist Church, the Birmingham Baha'i Center, the Birmingham Friends Meeting, and Redeemer Community Church. The Baha'i center and the Friends meetinghouse were originally houses. Redeemer's domed building was built for South Avondale Baptist Church.

== Avondale Park ==
The district is centered around Avondale Park, a city park that has been reserved for green space since the urban development of the neighborhood in 1887. It was the venue for archery during the 2022 World Games.
