= Loan Drouard =

French wushu practitioner

Personal information
- Born: January 25, 2002 (age 24) France
- Occupation(s): Martial artist, athlete

Sport
- Sport: Wushu
- Event(s): Changquan, Daoshu, Gunshu
- Team: France Wushu Team
Medal record
Men's Wushu Taolu
Representing France
World Games
Bronze medal – third place	2022 Birmingham	Daoshu+Gunshu
World Championships
Silver medal – second place	2025 Brasília	Gunshu
European Championships
Gold medal – first place	2024 Stockholm	Changquan
Gold medal – first place	2024 Stockholm	Gunshu
Silver medal – second place	2024 Stockholm	Daoshu
Mediterranean Championships
Gold medal – first place	2019 Marseille	Changquan
Gold medal – first place	2019 Marseille	Daoshu
Gold medal – first place	2019 Marseille	Gunshu
World Kungfu Championships
Gold medal – first place	2017 Emeishan	Shaolinquan B
European Junior Championships
Silver medal – second place	2018 Moscow	Daoshu A
Silver medal – second place	2018 Moscow	Gunshu A
Bronze medal – third place	2018 Moscow	Changquan A

Loan Drouard (born 2002) is a wushu practitioner from France.

== Career ==
Drouard first encountered wushu at the age of seven after seeing a documentary of Shaolin kung fu. At the age of nine, he began his training at a traditional Shaolin school in Henan, and later began training modern wushu in France at the age of twelve. In 2017, he competed in the World Kungfu Championships and won a gold medal in shaolinquan. He then made his contemporary junior continental debut at the 2018 European Junior Wushu Championships where he won silver medals in daoshu and gunshu and bronze in changquan. Shortly after, he competed in the 2018 World Junior Wushu Championships and finished 10th in changquan and 5th in daoshu and gunshu. A year later, he competed in the 2019 Mediterranean Wushu Championships and won three gold medals in his events. Shortly after, Drouard made his senior international debut at the 2019 World Wushu Championships.

After the COVID-19 pandemic, Drouard's first appearance was at the 2022 World Games where he won the bronze medal in men's daoshu and gunshu combined. A year later, he competed in the 2023 World Wushu Championships and finished with high placements. This qualified him for the 2024 Taolu World Cup where he finished 4th in daoshu and 5th in gunshu. The same year, he competed in the 2024 European Wushu Championships and became the European champion in changquan and gunshu and won a silver medal in daoshu. A year later, Drouard competed in the 2025 World Games and finished 5th in men's changquan but dropped out of the other events. A few weeks later, he competed in the 2025 World Wushu Championships and won the silver medal in gunshu.
