= Senegal at the 2022 World Games =

- IOC code: SEN
- NOC: Senegalese National Olympic and Sports Committee

in Birmingham, United States 7 July 2022 – 17 July 2022
- Competitors: 1 (1 man) in 1 sport and 1 event
- Medals: Gold 0 Silver 0 Bronze 0 Total 0

World Games appearances
- 1981; 1985; 1989; 1993; 1997; 2001; 2005; 2009; 2013; 2017; 2022

Senegal competed at the 2022 World Games held in Birmingham, United States from 7 to 17 July 2022.

== Competitors ==
The following is the list of number of competitors in the Games.

Sport	Men	Women	Total
Wushu	1	0	1
Total	1	0	1

== Wushu ==
Senegal competed in wushu.

Athlete	Event	Apparatus 1		Apparatus 2		Total	
Athlete	Event	Score	Rank	Score	Rank	Score	Rank
Ousmanne Gueye	Men's nanquan / nangun	7.637	6	7.837	6	15.474	6
