= Senegal at the 2017 World Games =

Senegal at the World Games 2017
- IOC code: SEN
- NOC: Senegalese National Olympic and Sports Committee

in Wrocław, Poland 20 July 2017 – 30 July 2017
- Competitors: 2 in 1 sport

World Games appearances
- 1981; 1985; 1989; 1993; 1997; 2001; 2005; 2009; 2013; 2017; 2022; 2025

Senegal competed at the World Games 2017 in Wrocław, Poland, from 20 to 30 July 2017.

== Competitors ==
Sports	Men	Women	Total	Events
Karate	1	1	2	1
Total	1	1	2	1

== Karate ==
Senegal has qualified at the 2017 World Games:

- Men's Kumite -60kg - 1 quota (Saliou Diouf)
- Women's Kumite -61kg – 1 quota (Magatte Seck)
