= Cue sports at the 2022 World Games =

- Venue: Birmingham Jefferson Convention Complex
- Dates: 13–17 July 2022
- No. of events: 5
- Competitors: 64 from 35 nations

The 2022 World Games had four cue sports events, which took place in July 2022, in Birmingham, Alabama in United States, at the Birmingham Jefferson Convention Complex. Originally scheduled to take place in July 2021, the Games were rescheduled for July 2022 as a result of the 2020 Summer Olympics postponement due to the COVID-19 pandemic.

== Participating nations ==
- Argentina (1)
- Austria (2)
- Bahrain (1)
- Belgium (1)
- Bosnia and Herzegovina (1)
- Brazil (1)
- Canada (2)
- Chinese Taipei (2)
- Colombia (2)
- Costa Rica (2)
- Ecuador (1)
- Egypt (2)
- Germany (5)
- Great Britain (3)
- Hong Kong (1)
- India (2)
- Italy (1)
- Japan (2)
- Kuwait (1)
- Netherlands (1)
- New Zealand (2)
- Pakistan (1)
- Peru (1)
- Philippines (2)
- Poland (3)
- Qatar (2)
- Singapore (1)
- South Africa (1)
- South Korea (2)
- Spain (2)
- Sweden (1)
- Thailand (1)
- Turkey (2)
- United States (8)
- Vietnam (1)

== Medal table ==
* Host nation (United States)

Rank	Nation	Gold	Silver	Bronze	Total
1	Great Britain	1	0	1	2
2	Germany	1	0	0	1
2	Hong Kong	1	0	0	1
2	Netherlands	1	0	0	1
5	Bosnia and Herzegovina	0	1	0	1
5	Chinese Taipei	0	1	0	1
5	Colombia	0	1	0	1
5	Egypt	0	1	0	1
9	Belgium	0	0	1	1
9	Japan	0	0	1	1
9	Singapore	0	0	1	1
Totals (11 entries)		4	4	4	12

== Medalists ==
Event	Gold	Silver	Bronze
Men's 3-cushion carom	Dick Jaspers; Netherlands	José Juan García; Colombia	Eddy Merckx; Belgium
Men's 9-ball pool	Joshua Filler; Germany	Sanjin Pehlivanović; Bosnia and Herzegovina	Aloysius Yapp; Singapore
Women's 9-ball pool	Kelly Fisher; Great Britain	Chou Chieh-yu; Chinese Taipei	Yuki Hiraguchi; Japan
Men's snooker	Cheung Ka Wai; Hong Kong	Abdelrahman Shahin; Egypt	Darren Morgan; Great Britain
