= Nepal at the 2022 World Games =

- IOC code: NEP
- NOC: Nepal Olympic Committee

in Birmingham, United States 7 July 2022 – 17 July 2022
- Competitors: 2 (1 man and 1 woman) in 1 sport
- Medals: Gold 0 Silver 0 Bronze 0 Total 0

World Games appearances
- 1981; 1985; 1989; 1993; 1997; 2001; 2005; 2009; 2013; 2017; 2022; 2025

Nepal competed at the 2022 World Games in Birmingham, Alabama, United States from 7 July to 17 July 2022.

== Competitors ==
Two athletes from Nepal qualified for the Games.

Sport	Men	Women	Total
Wushu	1	1	2
Total	1	1	2

== Wushu ==
Both of Nepal's athletes competed in wushu.

Athlete	Event	Apparatus 1		Apparatus 2		Total	
Athlete	Event	Score	Rank	Score	Rank	Score	Rank
Hamal Deepak	Men's nanquan / nangun	DNS				—N/a	
Nima Gharti Magar	Women's nanquan / nandao	DNS				—N/a	
