= Singapore at the 2022 World Games =

- IOC code: SGP
- NOC: Singapore National Olympic Council

in Birmingham, United States 7 July 2022 – 17 July 2022
- Competitors: 15 (3 men and 12 women) in 5 sports
- Medals Ranked 63rd: Gold 0 Silver 1 Bronze 3 Total 4

World Games appearances
- 1981; 1985; 1989; 1993; 1997; 2001; 2005; 2009; 2013; 2017; 2022; 2025

Singapore competed at the 2022 World Games held in Birmingham, United States from 7 to 17 July 2022. Athletes representing Singapore won one silver medal and two bronze medals. The country finished in 57th place in the medal table.

== Medalists ==
Medal	Name	Sport	Event	Date
Bronze	Aloysius Yapp	Cue sports	Men's 9-ball pool	16 July

=== Invitational sports ===
Medal	Name	Sport	Event	Date
Silver	Jowen Lim	Wushu	Men's daoshu & gunshu	12 July
Bronze	Vera Tan	Wushu	Women's taijiquan & taijijian	12 July

== Competitors ==
The following is the list of number of competitors in the Games:

Sport	Men	Women	Total
Billiards sports	1	0	1
Bowling	0	2	2
Canoe polo	0	7	7
Ju-jitsu	0	1	1
Wushu	2	2	4
Total	3	12	15

== Bowling ==
Singapore competed in bowling.

Athlete	Event	Round of 32	Round of 16	Quarterfinal	Semifinal	Final / BM	
Athlete	Event	Opposition Result	Opposition Result	Opposition Result	Opposition Result	Opposition Result	Rank
Hui Fen New	Women's singles	Blankenzee (NED); L 159–203, 222–226	did not advance				
Cherie Tan	Women's singles	Lopes D'Andrade (FRA); W 215–193, 235–226	Dammers (ARU); W 246–177, 216–161	Ribguth (GER); L 247–206, 182–208, 181–258	did not advance		
Hui Fen New; Cherie Tan	Women's doubles	—N/a	Yang/Kim (KOR); L 181–195, 166–266	did not advance			

== Canoe polo ==
Singapore competed in canoe polo.

Athletes	Event	Preliminary round				Quarterfinal	Semifinal / CS	Final / BM / PF	
Athletes	Event	Opposition Result	Opposition Result	Opposition Result	Rank	Opposition Result	Opposition Result	Opposition Result	Rank
Li Ling Tan; Kasxier Low; Shu Wen Ong; Fang Hui Leow; Carmellia Kiong; Konstanze Kwek; Hui Xuan Ng	Women's tournament	Italy (ITA); L 1–3	Netherlands (NED); L 3–4	Great Britain (GBR); W 6–5	3	Germany (GER); L 0–5	Consolation Semifinal; United States (USA); W 6–2	5th place final Netherlands (NED); L 1–4	6

== Cue sports ==
Singapore competed in cue sports. Aloysius Yapp won the bronze medal in nine-ball pool.

Athlete	Event	Round of 16	Quarterfinal	Semifinal	Final / BM	
Athlete	Event	Opposition Result	Opposition Result	Opposition Result	Opposition Result	Rank
Aloysius Yapp	Nine-ball	Edwards (NZL); W 11–3	Sánchez Ruíz (ESP); W 11–7	Pehlivanović (BIH); L 7–11	Biado (PHI); W 11–8	3rd place, bronze medalist(s)

== Ju-jitsu ==
Singapore competed in ju-jitsu.

Athlete	Event	Elimination round			Semifinal	Final / BM	
Athlete	Event	Opposition Result	Opposition Result	Rank	Opposition Result	Opposition Result	Rank
May Yong Teh	Women's ne-waza 48 kg	Brodski (GER); L 0–14	Hoang (CAN); L 0–25	3	did not advance		

== Wushu ==
Singapore won two medals in wushu.

Athlete	Event	Apparatus 1		Apparatus 2		Total	
Athlete	Event	Score	Rank	Score	Rank	Score	Rank
Jesse Adalia	Men's changquan	DNS		—N/a			
Jowen Lim	Men's daoshu / gunshu	9.520	2	9.564	2	19.084	2nd place, silver medalist(s)
Isabel Xin Ting Chua	Women's jianshu / qiangshu	DNS					6
Vera Tan	Women's taijijian / taijiquan	9.477	3	9.470	3	18.947	3rd place, bronze medalist(s)
