= David Benck =

American lawyer

David M. Benck is a dual American and Luxembourg lawyer. He graduated from Birmingham–Southern College (BA Economics 1990) and the University of Alabama School of Law (JD 1993). Benck is the Senior Vice President, general counsel, and secretary for JD Sports in North America, formerly Hibbett Sports, Inc. as well as a well-known commercial and sport arbitrator.

In 2025, LAW.com named him a finalist for General Counsel of the year.

In May 2012, the American Arbitration Association announced that Benck had been named to the AAA's global Board of Directors, and indicated that "Mr. Benck has served as an international arbitrator in numerous matters in both the commercial, sport and employment areas and has been published in the AAA’s Dispute Resolution Journal. Mr. Benck is an adjunct professor at Cumberland School of Law where he teaches Practicing Law In House. Mr. Benck is on the Norton Board of Advisors for Birmingham–Southern College, is the current President of the Alabama Chapter of the Association of Corporate Counsel, and is the legal counsel to the Alabama Sports Hall of Fame. In 2011, the Association of Corporate Counsel named Benck “General Counsel of the Year.”

Benck is a member of the International Court of Arbitration for Sport in Switzerland, frequently referred to as the global Supreme Court of Sport. Judges on the Court routinely oversee global sport disputes involving FIFA, anti-doping, Hyperandrogenism, sport integrity, corruption and bribery issues.

Benck briefly served on the Board of Directors of USA Gymnastics. According to ESPN, he was brought in to oversee the complete Board restructuring and CEO replacement in response to the sex abuse allegations.

In January 2016, the Federal Reserve Bank of Atlanta announced that Benck had been appointed to the Board of Directors where he served two - 3 year terms; subsequently appointed to the Federal Reserve’s Special Committee on Payment Innovation and Inclusion.

He was a member of the bid team that won World Games 2021 for Birmingham, Alabama, United States.

Benck was appointed to the NCAA inaugural Independent Resolution Panel to oversee adjudication of Division 1 compliance issues as part of Condoleezza Rice investigation into college basketball corruption, including adjudicating the NCAA v. Mark Gottfried/North Carolina State case, and the NCAA v. Rick Pitino/University of Louisville case.

Benck has been published in national publications including for the NACD, The Society for Human Resource Management, the Association of Corporate Counsel, The Docket, HostingTech, the Web Hosting Industry Review, and The Computer Law Associates Bulletin.
