= Panama at the 2022 World Games =

- IOC code: PAN
- NOC: Panama Olympic Committee

in Birmingham, United States 7 July 2022 – 17 July 2022
- Competitors: 26 (14 men and 12 women) in 3 sports
- Medals Ranked 70th: Gold 0 Silver 0 Bronze 1 Total 1

World Games appearances
- 1981; 1985; 1989; 1993; 1997; 2001; 2005; 2009; 2013; 2017; 2022; 2025

Panama competed at the 2022 World Games held in Birmingham, United States from 7 to 17 July 2022. Athletes representing Panama won one bronze medal and the country finished in 70th place in the medal table.

== Medalists ==
=== Invitational sports ===
Medal	Name	Sport	Event	Date
Bronze	Women's team	Flag football	Women's tournament	July 14

== Competitors ==
The following is the list of number of competitors in the Games.

Sport	Men	Women	Total
Flag football	12	12	24
Ju-jitsu	1	0	1
Karate	1	0	1
Total	14	12	26

== Flag football ==
Panama won one bronze medal in flag football.

== Ju-jitsu ==
Panama competed in ju-jitsu.

== Karate ==
Panama competed in karate.

Athlete	Event	Elimination round				Semifinal	Final / BM	
Athlete	Event	Opposition Result	Opposition Result	Opposition Result	Rank	Opposition Result	Opposition Result	Rank
Héctor Cención	Men's kata	Moto (JPN); L 23.98–25.74	Tozaki (USA); L 24.00–25.46	Heydarov (AZE); L 24.54–24.78	4	Did not advance		6
