= Harris Horatius =

Indonesian wushu practitioner

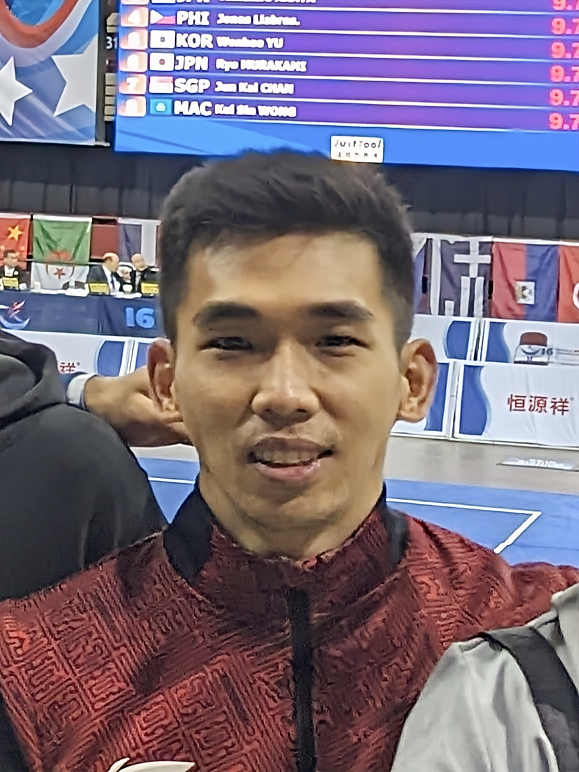
- Harris Horatius at the 2023 World Wushu Championships in Fort Worth, USA

Personal information
- Born: 11 October 1995 (age 30) Medan, Indonesia
- Education: Universitas Prima Indonesia (Law)
- Occupation(s): Athlete, martial artist, public servant
- Height: 1.64 m (5 ft 5 in)
- Weight: 64 kg (141 lb)
- Spouse: Janice Jeconiah

Sport
- Sport: Wushu
- Event(s): Nanquan, Nangun
- Club: North Sumatra
- Team: Indonesia Wushu Team
- Coached by: Novita (National); Zhang Yueping (International)
Medal record
Men's wushu taolu
Representing Indonesia
World Games
Silver medal – second place	2022 Birmingham	Nanquan+Nangun
World Championships
Gold medal – first place	2019 Shanghai	Duilian
Gold medal – first place	2023 Fort Worth	Nandao
Bronze medal – third place	2015 Jakarta	Nangun
Bronze medal – third place	2023 Fort Worth	Nangun
Bronze medal – third place	2019 Shanghai	Nangun
Asian Games
Gold medal – first place	2022 Hangzhou	Nanquan+Nangun
SEA Games
Gold medal – first place	2015 Singapore	Nanquan+Nangun
Gold medal – first place	2019 Philippines	Duilian
Silver medal – second place	2019 Philippines	Nanquan
Silver medal – second place	2019 Philippines	Nandao+Nangun
Silver medal – second place	2021 Vietnam	Nanquan
Silver medal – second place	2023 Cambodia	Nandao+Nangun
Bronze medal – third place	2021 Vietnam	Nangun
ASEAN University Games
Gold medal – first place	2018 Naypyidaw	Nanquan
Silver medal – second place	2022 Ubon Ratchathani	Duilian
Bronze medal – third place	2022 Ubon Ratchathani	Nanquan
World Junior Championships
Silver medal – second place	2010 Singapore	Nandao (B)
Bronze medal – third place	2012 Macau	Nangun (A)
Asian Junior Championships
Gold medal – first place	2009 Macau	Nandao (B)
Gold medal – first place	2011 Shanghai	Nangun (A)
Gold medal – first place	2013 Manila	Nandao (A)
Bronze medal – third place	2011 Shanghai	Nanquan (A)
Bronze medal – third place	2013 Manila	Nanquan (A)

Harris Horatius (born 11 October 1995) is a wushu taolu athlete from Indonesia. He is a two-time world wushu champion, and gold medalist at the Asian Games and SEA Games.

== Career ==
=== Senior ===
Horatius' first major debut was at the 2015 SEA Games where he won the gold medal in nanquan and nangun combined. Four years later, he won a gold medal in duilian with Edgar Xavier Marvelo and Seraf Naro Siregar and a bronze medal in nangun at the 2019 World Wushu Championships. A few months later, he competed in the 2019 SEA Games where he won another gold medal in duilian and silver medals in nanquan and nandao/nangun combined.

After the start of the COVID-19 pandemic, Horatius competed in the 2021 SEA Games held in May 2022 where he won a silver medal in nanquan and a bronze medal in nangun. Shortly after, he won the silver medal in nanquan/nangun combined at the 2022 World Games. He won the gold medal in men's nanquan at the 2022 Asian Games. He won the silver medal in nandao and nangun combined at the 2023 SEA Games. Competing in the 2023 World Wushu Championships, he became the world champion in nandao and won a bronze medal in nangun.

== See also ==
- List of Asian Games medalists in wushu
