= Edgar Xavier Marvelo =

Indonesian wushu practitioner

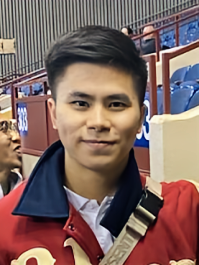
- Marvelo at the 2023 World Wushu Championships in Fort Worth, USA

Personal information
- Born: 16 December 1998 (age 27) Jakarta, Indonesia
- Education: Bhayangkara Jakarta Raya University
- Occupations: Martial artist, athlete, public servant
- Height: 1.73 m (5 ft 8 in)
- Weight: 65 kg (143 lb)

Sport
- Sport: Wushu
- Events: Changquan, Daoshu, Gunshu
- Club: DKI Jakarta
- Team: Indonesia Wushu Team
- Coached by: Novita (National); Zhang Yuening (International)
Medal record
Men's wushu taolu
Representing Indonesia
World Games
Gold medal – first place	2022 Birmingham	Changquan
World Championships
Gold medal – first place	2019 Shanghai	Changquan
Gold medal – first place	2019 Shanghai	Gunshu
Gold medal – first place	2019 Shanghai	Duilian
Silver medal – second place	2017 Kazan	Daoshu
Silver medal – second place	2025 Brasília	Duilian
Bronze medal – third place	2025 Brasília	Changquan
Asian Games
Silver medal – second place	2018 Jakarta–Palembang	Changquan
Silver medal – second place	2022 Hangzhou	Changquan
World University Games
Silver medal – second place	2021 Chengdu	Changquan
Silver medal – second place	2021 Chengdu	Daoshu
University World Cup
Gold medal – first place	2022 Samsun	Changquan
SEA Games
Gold medal – first place	2019 Philippines	Daoshu+Gunshu
Gold medal – first place	2019 Philippines	Duilian
Gold medal – first place	2023 Cambodia	Changquan
Gold medal – first place	2025 Thailand	Changquan+Daoshu+Gunshu
Silver medal – second place	2023 Cambodia	Daoshu+Gunshu
Silver medal – second place	2025 Thailand	Duilian
Bronze medal – third place	2017 Kuala Lumpur	Changquan
ASEAN University Games
Gold medal – first place	2022 Ubon Ratchathani	Changquan
Gold medal – first place	2022 Ubon Ratchathani	Daoshu
Silver medal – second place	2022 Ubon Ratchathani	Duilian
World Junior Championships
Gold medal – first place	2010 Singapore	Gunshu (C)
Gold medal – first place	2016 Burgas	Daoshu (A)
Silver medal – second place	2016 Burgas	Changquan (A)
Silver medal – second place	2016 Burgas	Gunshu (A)
ASEAN School Games
Gold medal – first place	2014 Marikina	Changquan+Gunshu

Edgar Xavier Marvelo (born December 16, 1998) is a retired wushu taolu athlete from Indonesia. He is one of the most renowned male wushu athletes from Indonesia of all time.

== Career ==
=== Junior ===
Marvelo began practicing wushu at the age of six. He won a gold medal in gunshu at the 2010 World Junior Wushu Championships. He won a gold medal at the 2014 ASEAN School Games and a year later in 2015, Marvelo was the Indonesian youth national champion.

=== Senior ===
Marvelo's first major international appearance was at the 2017 SEA Games where he won a bronze medal in the men's changquan event. He then debuted at the 2017 World Wushu Championships where he won a silver medal in men's daoshu. A year later, Marvelo won Indonesia's first medal at the 2018 Asian Games by placing second in the men's changquan event.

In 2019, he competed again at the World Wushu Championships and earned three gold medals in men's changquan, gunshu, and in the duilian event with Harris Horatius and Seraf Naro Siregar. His three gold medals made him the most prolific non-Chinese wushu athlete during a single rendition of the championships. A few weeks after the competition, Marvelo won two more gold medals at the 2019 SEA Games in the men's daoshu and gunshu combined event and duilian. He dedicated his victory at the games to his late father, who died on the morning of his event.

Marvelo's first major competition after the start of the COVID-19 pandemic was at the 2021 Pekan Olahraga Nasional (National Sports Week) in Java where he won gold medals in changquan as well as in daoshu and gunshu combined. Following this, he competed in the 2021 SEA Games (which was rescheduled to 2022) where he did not place in any event. Two months later, he won the gold medal in men's changquan at the 2022 World Games.

The following year at the 2023 Southeast Asian Games, Marvelo avenged his former losses and won a gold medal in changquan and a silver medal in daoshu and gunshu combined. Shortly thereafter, he won silver medals in changquan and daoshu at the 2021 Summer World University Games. About two months later, Marvelo repeated his silver medal victory in men's changquan at the 2022 Asian Games.

At the 2023 World Wushu Championships, Marvelo was injured in the middle of his changquan routine and was not able to complete his event. He took a long pause from training and competing to recover. He made his major international return at the 2025 World Wushu Championships where he was able to secure the bronze medal in changquan and silver medal in duilian. Marvelo's final competition was at the 2025 SEA Games where he won the gold medal in the changquan, daoshu, and gunshu all-around event and the silver medal in duilian. He retired from competitive wushu to focus on his family and career.

== Competitive History ==
Year	Event	CQ	DS	GS	DL	AA
Junior
2010	World Junior Championships	9		1st place, gold medalist(s)		
2014	ASEAN School Games	1		1		1st place, gold medalist(s)
2015	Asian Junior Championships	?		?		
2016	World Junior Championships	2nd place, silver medalist(s)	1st place, gold medalist(s)	2nd place, silver medalist(s)		
Senior
2017	SEA Games	3rd place, bronze medalist(s)	?	?		5
2017	World Championships	28	2nd place, silver medalist(s)	22		
2018	Asian Games	2nd place, silver medalist(s)				
2019	World Championships	1st place, gold medalist(s)	14	1st place, gold medalist(s)	1st place, gold medalist(s)	
2019	SEA Games	4	1	1	1st place, gold medalist(s)	1st place, gold medalist(s)
2020	did not compete due to COVID-19 pandemic					
2021	National Sports Week	1st place, gold medalist(s)	1	1		1st place, gold medalist(s)
2022	SEA Games	7	2	8		5
2022	World Games	1st place, gold medalist(s)				
2022	ASEAN University Games	1st place, gold medalist(s)	1st place, gold medalist(s)		2nd place, silver medalist(s)	
2022	University World Cup	1st place, gold medalist(s)				
2023	SEA Games	1st place, gold medalist(s)	2	2		2nd place, silver medalist(s)
2023	World University Games	2nd place, silver medalist(s)	2nd place, silver medalist(s)			
2023	Asian Games	2nd place, silver medalist(s)				
2023	World Combat Games	DNS				
2023	World Championships	DNF	DNS	DNS	DNS	
2025	World Championships	3rd place, bronze medalist(s)			2nd place, silver medalist(s)	
2025	SEA Games	1st place, gold medalist(s)			2nd place, silver medalist(s)	

== Awards ==
- Indonesian Journalists Association: Best male athlete (2020, 22)
- Ministry of Youth and Sports: Outstanding sports player (2020)
- Fila: Indonesian brand ambassador (2022)

== See also ==
- List of Asian Games medalists in wushu
