= Brunei at the 2022 World Games =

- IOC code: BRU
- NOC: Brunei Darussalam National Olympic Council

in Birmingham, United States 7 July 2022 – 17 July 2022
- Competitors: 2 (1 man and 1 woman) in 1 sport and 2 events
- Medals Ranked 42nd: Gold 1 Silver 1 Bronze 0 Total 2

World Games appearances
- 1981; 1985; 1989; 1993; 1997; 2001; 2005; 2009; 2013; 2017; 2022

Brunei competed at the 2022 World Games held in Birmingham, United States from 7 to 17 July 2022. Athletes representing Brunei won one gold medal and one silver medal. The country finished in 42nd place in the medal table.

== Medalists ==
=== Invitational sports ===
Medal	Name	Sport	Event	Date
Gold	Basma Lachkar	Wushu	Women's taijiquan & taijijian	12 July
Silver	Hosea Wong Zheng Yu	Wushu	Men's taijiquan & taijijian	13 July

== Competitors ==
The following is the list of number of competitors in the Games.

Sport	Men	Women	Total
Wushu	1	1	1
Total	1	1	2

== Wushu ==
Brunei won two medals in wushu.
