= Moldova at the 2022 World Games =

- IOC code: MDA
- NOC: National Olympic Committee of the Republic of Moldova

in Birmingham, United States 7 July 2022 – 17 July 2022
- Competitors: 2 (1 man and 1 woman) in 1 sport and 1 event
- Medals Ranked 47th: Gold 1 Silver 0 Bronze 0 Total 1

World Games appearances
- 1981; 1985; 1989; 1993; 1997; 2001; 2005; 2009; 2013; 2017; 2022

Moldova competed at the 2022 World Games held in Birmingham, United States from 7 to 17 July 2022. Athletes representing Moldova won one gold medal and the country finished in 47th place in the medal table.

== Medalists ==
Medal	Name	Sport	Event	Date
Gold	Anna Matus; Gabriele Pasquale Goffredo	Dancesport	Latin	8 July

== Competitors ==
The following is the list of number of competitors in the Games.

Sport	Men	Women	Total
Dancesport	1	1	2
Total	1	1	2

== Dancesport ==
Moldova won one gold medal in dancesport.
