= Bill Battle Coliseum =

Multi-purpose arena in Birmingham, Alabama

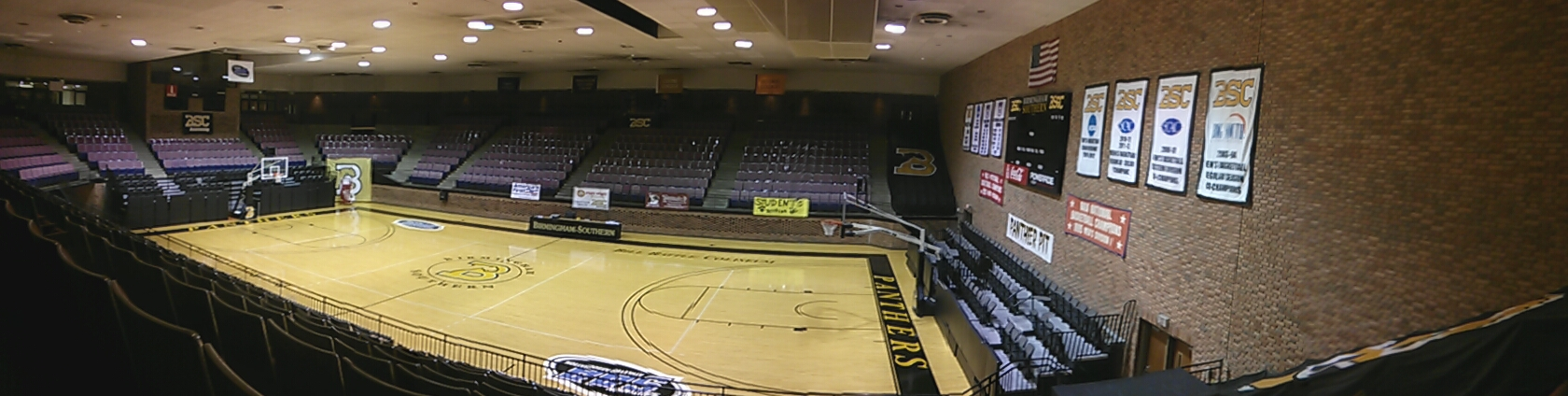
- Interactive map of Bill Battle Coliseum
- Location: 900 Arkadelphia Rd, Birmingham, Alabama 35254
- Coordinates: 33.5155°N 86.8516°W
- Owner: Birmingham–Southern College
- Capacity: Basketball:1,600

Construction
- Opened: 1981
- Closed: 2024
- Cost: $3.2 million

Tenant
- Birmingham–Southern College Panthers

Website
- BCS Facilities Page

Bill Battle Coliseum is a 2,000-seat multi-purpose arena in Birmingham, Alabama. The arena opened in 1981 and was home to the Birmingham–Southern College Panthers basketball team.

The arena was the venue for karate, jujitsu, and wushu taolu (invitational) during the 2022 World Games.

The arena was shuttered after BSC closed in 2024. Its fate is unknown.
