= Kyrgyzstan at the 2022 World Games =

- IOC code: KGZ
- NOC: National Olympic Committee of the Kyrgyz Republic

in Birmingham, United States 7 July 2022 – 17 July 2022
- Competitors: 2 (2 men) in 2 sports and 2 events
- Medals Ranked 60th: Gold 0 Silver 1 Bronze 1 Total 2

World Games appearances
- 1981; 1985; 1989; 1993; 1997; 2001; 2005; 2009; 2013; 2017; 2022; 2025

Kyrgyzstan competed at the 2022 World Games held in Birmingham, United States from 7 to 17 July 2022. Athletes representing Kyrgyzstan won one silver medal and one bronze medal. The country finished in 60th place in the medal table.

== Medalists ==
Medal	Name	Sport	Event	Date
Silver	Abdurahmanhaji Murtazaliev	Ju-jitsu	Men's ne-waza 85 kg	15 July
Bronze	Ikbol Fozilzhonov	Kickboxing	Men's 63.5 kg	14 July

== Competitors ==
The following is the list of number of competitors in the Games.

Sport	Men	Women	Total
Ju-jitsu	1	0	1
Kickboxing	1	0	1
Total	2	0	2

== Ju-jitsu ==
Kyrgyzstan won one silver medal in ju-jitsu.

Athlete	Category	Quarterfinals	Semifinals	Final/Bronze medal bout	
Athlete	Category	Opposition Result	Opposition Result	Opposition Result	Rank
Abdurahmanhaji Murtazaliev	Men's ne-waza 85 kg	Kozak (POL); W 2–0	Shemesh (ISR); W 4–2	Al-Ketbi (UAE); L 0–0	2nd place, silver medalist(s)

== Kickboxing ==
Kyrgyzstan won one bronze medal in kickboxing.

Athlete	Category	Quarterfinals	Semifinals	Final/Bronze medal bout	
Athlete	Category	Opposition Result	Opposition Result	Opposition Result	Rank
Ikbol Fozilzhonov	Men's 63.5 kg	Ivanović (BIH); W 3–0	Martínez (MEX); L WO	Tlemissov (KAZ); W 3–0	3rd place, bronze medalist(s)
