= Bahrain at the 2022 World Games =

- IOC code: BHR
- NOC: Bahrain Olympic Committee

in Birmingham, United States 7 July 2022 – 17 July 2022
- Competitors: 3 (3 men) in 3 sports
- Medals Ranked 63rd: Gold 0 Silver 1 Bronze 0 Total 1

World Games appearances
- 1981; 1985; 1989; 1993; 1997; 2001; 2005; 2009; 2013; 2017; 2022

Bahrain competed at the 2022 World Games held in Birmingham, United States from 7 to 17 July 2022. Athletes representing Bahrain won one silver medal and the country finished in 63rd place in the medal table.

== Medalists ==
Medal	Name	Sport	Event	Date
Silver	Ali Munfaredi	Ju-jitsu	Men's ne-waza 77 kg	15 July

== Competitors ==
The following is the list of number of competitors in the Games.

Sport	Men	Women	Total
Cue sports	1	0	1
Duathlon	1	0	1
Ju-jitsu	1	0	1
Total	3	0	3

== Cue sports ==
Bahrain competed in cue sports.

Athlete	Event	Round of 16	Quarterfinal	Semifinal	Final / BM
Athlete	Event	Opposition Result	Opposition Result	Opposition Result	Opposition Result
Habib Subah	Snooker	Dikme (GER); L 0–3	did not advance		

== Duathlon ==
Bahrain competed in duathlon.

== Ju-jitsu ==
Bahrain won one silver medal in ju-jitsu.
