= Yaroslav Tkach =

Ukrainian speed climber (born 2001)

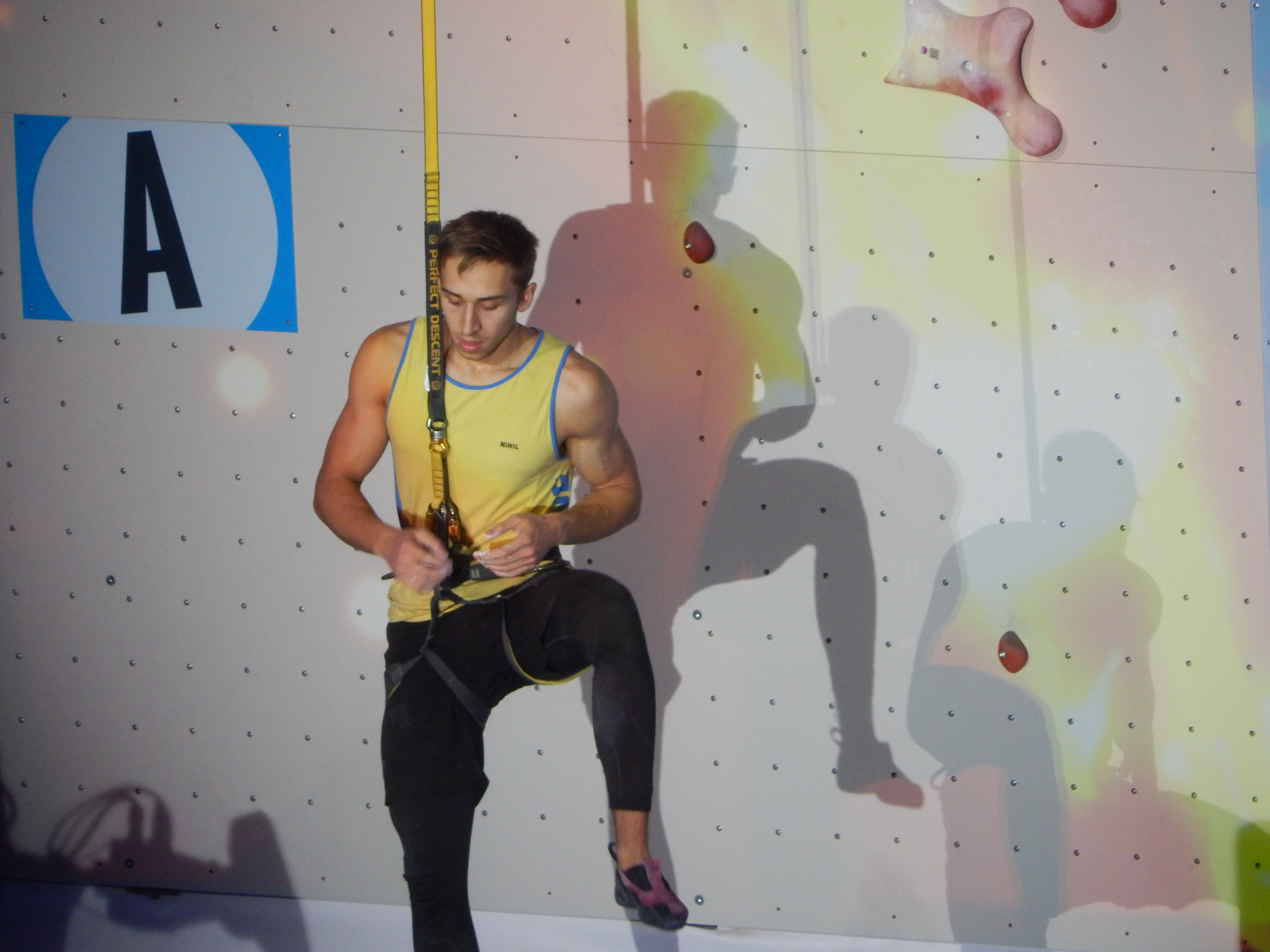
- Yaroslav Tkach at the 2020 European Championships

Personal information
- Native name: Ярослав Ткач
- Nationality: Ukrainian
- Born: 31 October 2001 (age 24) Kremenchuk, Ukraine
- Years active: 2015–present
- Height: 1.82 m (6 ft 0 in)

Sport
- Country: Ukraine
- Sport: Competition climbing
- Event(s): Competition speed climbing, combined
Medal record
Men's competition climbing
Representing Ukraine
Event / 1st / 2nd / 3rd; World Games / – / – / 1
World Games
Bronze medal – third place	2022 Birmingham	Speed

Yaroslav Tkach (Ukrainian: Ярослав Ткач, born 31 October 2001) is a Ukrainian competition speed climber. He is 2022 World Games bronze medalist.

== Career ==
He competed in the 2018 Summer Youth Olympics in Buenos Aires, Argentina. There he was 11th (out of 21 competitors) in the boys' combined competition.

Tkach debuted at the senior level in 2018 when he participated at the 2018 World Championships. He finished 5th at the 2020 European Championships. In the 2021 season, Tkach finished 10th in the men's IFSC World Cup in the competition speed discipline. He finished 10th in the combined classification at the 2021 World Championships.

In the qualification seeding round of the 2024 Summer Olympics, Tkach received the 7th with the best time of 5.11. He finished the competition after losing 0.01 seconds to France's Bassa Mawem in the next round and placed in the 9th position.

== Major results ==
=== Olympic Games ===
Discipline	2024
Speed	9

=== World championships ===
Discipline	2018	2019	2021	2023
Speed	110	—	30	11
Bouldering	—	—	94	—
Lead	—	—	96	—
Combined	—	—	10	—

=== World Cup ===
Discipline	2018	2019	2021	2022	2023	2024
Speed	48	—	10	59	22	18

=== European championships ===
Discipline	2019	2020	2022	2024
Speed	14	5	9	7
