= New Zealand at the 2022 World Games =

- IOC code: NZL
- NOC: New Zealand Olympic Committee

7 July 2022 – 17 July 2022
- Competitors: 46 (22 men and 24 women) in 10 sports
- Medals Ranked 40th: Gold 1 Silver 1 Bronze 1 Total 3

World Games appearances (overview)
- 1981; 1985; 1989; 1993; 1997; 2001; 2005; 2009; 2013; 2017; 2022; 2025

New Zealand competed at the 2022 World Games held in Birmingham, United States from 7 to 17 July 2022. Athletes representing New Zealand won one gold medal, one silver medal and one bronze medal. The country finished in 40th place in the medal table.

== Medalists ==
Medal	Name	Sport	Event	Date
Gold	Tim Robertson	Orienteering	Men's sprint	15 July
Silver	Bronwyn Dibb	Trampoline gymnastics	Women's double mini-trampoline	17 July
Bronze	Women's team	Canoe polo	Women's tournament	17 July

== Competitors ==
The following is the list of number of competitors in the Games.

Sport	Men	Women	Total
Air sports	1	0	1
Archery	1	2	3
Beach handball	10	0	10
Canoe polo	8	8	16
Cue sports	1	1	2
Fistball	0	10	10
Karate	0	1	1
Orienteering	1	0	1
Trampoline gymnastics	0	1	1
Water skiing	0	1	1
Total	22	24	46

== Air sports ==
New Zealand competed in air sports.

== Archery ==
New Zealand competed in archery.

== Beach handball ==
New Zealand competed in beach handball.

== Canoe polo ==
New Zealand won the bronze medal in the women's canoe polo tournament.

== Cue sports ==
New Zealand competed in cue sports.

== Fistball ==
New Zealand competed in fistball.

== Karate ==
New Zealand competed in karate.

Athlete	Event	Elimination round				Semifinal	Final / BM	
Athlete	Event	Opposition Result	Opposition Result	Opposition Result	Rank	Opposition Result	Opposition Result	Rank
Alexandrea Anacan	Women's kata	Sánchez (ESP); L 23.54—25.74	Casale (ITA); L 23.58—24.66	Jüttner (GER); L 23.72—24.46	4	Did not advance		6

== Orienteering ==
New Zealand won one gold medal in orienteering.

== Trampoline gymnastics ==
New Zealand won one silver medal in trampoline gymnastics.

== Water skiing ==
New Zealand competed in water skiing.
