= Kazakhstan at the 2022 World Games =

- IOC code: KAZ
- NOC: National Olympic Committee of the Republic of Kazakhstan

in Birmingham, United States 7 July 2022 – 17 July 2022
- Competitors: 16 (11 men and 5 women) in 8 sports
- Medals Ranked 37th: Gold 1 Silver 2 Bronze 1 Total 4

World Games appearances
- 1981; 1985; 1989; 1993; 1997; 2001; 2005; 2009; 2013; 2017; 2022; 2025

Kazakhstan competed at the 2022 World Games held in Birmingham, United States from 7 to 17 July 2022. Athletes representing Kazakhstan won one gold medal, two silver medals and one bronze medal. The country finished in 37th place in the medal table.

== Medalists ==
Medal	Name	Sport	Event	Date
Gold	Sofya Berultseva	Karate	Women's kumite +68 kg	9 July
Silver	Galina Duvanova	Ju-jitsu	Women's ne-waza 57 kg	15 July
Silver	Almaz Sarsembekov	Muaythai	Men's 57 kg	17 July
Bronze	Daniyel Dil; Vadim Shulyar	Acrobatic gymnastics	Men's pair	16 July

== Competitors ==
The following is the list of number of competitors in the Games.

Sport	Men	Women	Total
Acrobatic gymnastics	2	2	4
Archery	1	0	1
Dancesport	1	0	1
Ju-jitsu	1	1	2
Karate	2	1	3
Kickboxing	1	0	1
Muaythai	2	0	2
Sport climbing	1	1	2
Total	11	5	16

== Acrobatic gymnastics ==
Kazakhstan won one bronze medal in acrobatic gymnastics.

== Archery ==
Kazakhstan competed in archery.

Athlete	Event	Ranking round		Round of 32	Round of 16	Quarterfinals	Semifinals	Final / BM	
Athlete	Event	Score	Seed	Opposition Result	Opposition Result	Opposition Result	Opposition Result	Opposition Result	Rank
Sergey Khristich	Men's compound	694	21	(France) Gontier; L 146–150	did not advance				

== Dancesport ==
Kazakhstan competed in dancesport (breaking).

== Ju-jitsu ==
Kazakhstan won one silver medal in ju-jitsu.

== Karate ==
Kazakhstan won one gold medal in karate.

Men

Athlete	Event	Elimination round				Semifinal	Final / BM	
Athlete	Event	Opposition Result	Opposition Result	Opposition Result	Rank	Opposition Result	Opposition Result	Rank
Darkhan Assadilov	Men's kumite 60 kg	Ruiz (USA); L 0–3	Ayoub Anis (ALG); W 5–2	Crescenzo (ITA); D 0–0	3	Did not advance		5
Nurkanat Azhikanov	Men's kumite 75 kg	Mahauden (BEL); D 5–5	Abdelaziz (EGY); L 3–5	Horuna (UKR); L 3–8	3	Did not advance		5

Women

Athlete	Event	Elimination round				Semifinal	Final / BM	
Athlete	Event	Opposition Result	Opposition Result	Opposition Result	Rank	Opposition Result	Opposition Result	Rank
Sofya Berultseva	Women's kumite +68 kg	Torres (ESP); W 7–7	Lingl (USA); W 4–1	Šáchová (CZE); W 3–1	1 Q	Jemi (TUN); W 3–1	Torres (ESP); W 7–1	1st place, gold medalist(s)

== Kickboxing ==
Kazakhstan competed in kickboxing.

Athlete	Category	Quarterfinals	Semifinals	Final/Bronze medal bout	
Athlete	Category	Opposition Result	Opposition Result	Opposition Result	Rank
Chingiskhan Tlemissov	Men's 63.5 kg	Santos (POR); W 2–1	Sananzade (UKR); L 0–3	Fozilzhonov (KGZ); L 0–3	4

== Muaythai ==
Kazakhstan won one silver medal in muaythai.

== Sport climbing ==
Kazakhstan competed in sport climbing.
