= 2022 World Games =

Multi-sport event in Birmingham, Alabama, U.S.

The World Games 2022
- Host city: Birmingham, Alabama, U.S.
- Nations: 99
- Athletes: 3,457
- Events: 223
- Opening: July 7, 2022
- Closing: July 17, 2022
- Opened by: Randall Woodfin; Mayor of Birmingham
- Main venue: Protective Stadium
- Website: twg2022.com (archived)

The 2022 World Games, also known as Birmingham 2022, were an international multi-sport event held from July 7 to 17, 2022, in Birmingham, Alabama, United States. They were the 11th World Games, a multi-sport event featuring disciplines of Olympic sports and other competitions that are not currently contested at the Olympic Games; the Games featured 3,457 athletes competing in 223 medal events over 34 total sports.

They were originally scheduled to be held from July 29 to August 8, 2021, but were postponed by one year due to the COVID-19 pandemic and the postponement of the 2020 Summer Olympics in Tokyo to 2021. They were the second edition of the World Games to be hosted by the United States since their inaugural edition in 1981.

== Bidding process ==
The cities that bid for the 2022 Games were:

- Lima, Peru
- Ufa, Russia
- Birmingham, United States

Barcelona and Santiago also considered bids. Cities paid a $125,000 application fee, and submitted information about "venues, infrastructure, volunteers, budget, transportation[,] and other elements".

Birmingham's bid, publicly announced in June 2014, was presented by Edgar Welden, Scotty Myers, and David Benck. It was the only American city authorized to make a bid for these games. Myers, the executive director of the Alabama Sports Hall of Fame and Museum, said the bid was "a dream, but it's not a pipe dream. It's attainable." At the time, organizers projected a budget of $75 million, and the Greater Birmingham Convention and Visitors Bureau anticipated an economic impact of between $224.4 million and $288.6 million in out-of-town dollars.

On January 22, 2015, at its meeting in Lausanne, the International World Games Association (IWGA) elected Birmingham as host of the 2021 World Games.

Lima would later host the 2019 Pan American Games.

On April 4, 2020, the Games were postponed to 2022 due to the COVID-19 pandemic and the associated postponement of the 2020 Summer Olympics.

== Venues ==
Venues for The World Games 2022 include:

- Avondale Park – archery
- Barber Motorsports Park – air sports (canopy piloting)
- Bessie Estell Park (next to PNC Field) – boules sports
- Birmingham CrossPlex

- Bill Harris Arena: artistic skating, inline hockey
- Natatorium: canoe polo, finswimming, lifesaving
- Indoor Track: wheelchair rugby

- Birmingham Jefferson Convention Complex

- Concert Hall: powerlifting
- East Exhibition Hall: floorball, korfball
- Legacy Arena: dancesport (Latin, rock n roll, standard), gymnastics (acrobatic, aerobic, rhythmic, trampoline and tumbling)
- North Exhibition Hall: bowling
- Sheraton Hotel Ballroom: billiards sports

- Birmingham Southern College

- Bill Battle Coliseum: ju-jitsu, karate, wushu
- BSC Panther Soccer Field: fistball
- campus: orienteering (sprint)

- Boutwell Auditorium – kickboxing, muay thai, sumo
- Hoover Metropolitan Stadium – softball
- John Carroll Catholic High School – flying disc
- Legion Field – flag football
- Oak Mountain State Park

- Double Oak Lake: canoe marathon, water skiing and wakeboard
- nature: orienteering (middle distance)

- Powell Steam Plant – track speedskating, road speedskating
- Protective Stadium – opening and closing ceremonies, air sports (drone racing)
- Railroad Park – duathlon (start and finish), orienteering (sprint relay)
- Regions Field – orienteering (part of sprint relay)
- Sloss Furnaces – beach handball, dancesport (breaking), gymnastics (parkour), sport climbing
- University of Alabama at Birmingham

- PNC Field: lacrosse
- University Recreation Center: racquetball, squash
- track and field complex: tug of war

== The Games ==
=== Sports ===
The 2022 World Games programme was first published featuring 30 official sports, including 54 disciplines encompassing 206 events. This was the first time that drone racing, canoe marathon, breaking, women's fistball, kickboxing, and parkour were included in the World Games as official sports. Softball and racquetball returned to the official World Games programme. Sports selected by the host organizing committee, at first called "invitational sports" but later added to the official programme, comprised 17 events included duathlon, flag football, wheelchair rugby, wushu (taolu) and men's lacrosse. Both men's and women's field lacrosse were played in a six-a-side format. José Perurena, IWGA President, stated, "In Birmingham, for the first time, invitational sports were no longer presented separately but were also part of the official programme." The numbers in parentheses indicate the number of medal events contested in each sports discipline.

- Air sports (2) ^{T}
- Archery (7) ^{P}
- Beach handball (2) ^{B}
- Billiards sports (4) ^{P}
- Boules sports (4) ^{P}
- Bowling (4) ^{P}
- Canoe marathon (4) ^{T}
- Canoe polo (2) ^{B}
- Dancesport (5) ^{AD}
- Duathlon (3) ^{O}
- Finswimming (16) ^{T}
- Fistball (2) ^{B}
- Flag football (2) ^{O}
- Floorball (1) ^{B}
- Flying disc (1) ^{T}
- Gymnastics
  - Acrobatic gymnastics (5) ^{AD}
  - Aerobic gymnastics (4) ^{AD}
  - Rhythmic gymnastics (4) ^{AD}
  - Trampoline gymnastics (4) ^{AD}
- Ju-jitsu (18) ^{M}
- Karate (12) ^{M}
- Kickboxing (6) ^{M}
- Korfball (1) ^{B}
- Lacrosse (2) ^{B(W) O(M)}
- Lifesaving (16) ^{T}
- Muaythai (12) ^{M}
- Orienteering (5) ^{T}
- Parkour (4) ^{AD}
- Powerlifting (8) ^{S}
- Racquetball (2) ^{B}
- Roller sports
  - Artistic roller skating (3) ^{AD}
  - Inline hockey (1) ^{B}
  - Road speed skating (8) ^{T}
  - Track speed skating (10) ^{T}
- Softball (1) ^{B}
- Sport climbing (6) ^{T}
- Squash (2) ^{B}
- Sumo (8) ^{M}
- Tug of war (3) ^{S}
- Water skiing (8) ^{T}
- Wheelchair rugby (1) ^{O}
- Wushu (10) ^{O}

AD: Artistic and Dance sports
B: Ball sports
O: Optional sports, selected by the host city
M: Martial arts
P: Precision sports
S: Strength sports
T: Trend sports

=== Participating nations ===
On February 19, 2021, the International Olympic Committee announced that certain Russian athletes would be allowed to compete under the designation "ROC" (for Russian Olympic Committee) at the Tokyo 2020 and Beijing 2022 Winter Games. This penalty also applied through end of 2022 and would have been applied to events affiliated with the International Olympic Committee, such as The World Games.

Following the 2022 Russian invasion of Ukraine, athletes from Russia along with Belarus were barred from the 2022 World Games, per the IOC's recommendations. Russia originally qualified 62 athletes while Belarus was set to send 11 athletes. Part of the ticket revenue was donated to Ukraine for rebuilding sports venues after the Russian invasion of the country.

Athletes from 110 National Olympic Committees were scheduled to participate. In total, athletes from 99 delegations competed at the 2022 World Games. The only representative team in the 2022 World Games not represented by a National Olympic Committee were the Haudenosaunee teams competing in lacrosse. They were originally not allowed to enter by the International World Games Association due to not having a NOC. A special dispensation was made possible by an act of sportsmanship by the Ireland lacrosse team, who withdrew from its qualifying position to allow the Haudenosaunee to compete.

Participating Nations
- Afghanistan (3)
- Algeria (1)
- Argentina (46)
- Aruba (2)
- Australia (98)
- Austria (72)
- Azerbaijan (15)
- Bahrain (3)
- Belgium (77)
- Bosnia and Herzegovina (3)
- Bolivia (2)
- Brazil (74)
- Brunei (2)
- Bulgaria (10)
- Cambodia (2)
- Canada (132)
- Chile (28)
- China (40)
- Colombia (70)
- Costa Rica (9)
- Croatia (21)
- Cuba (1)
- Czech Republic (87)
- Denmark (44)
- Dominican Republic (2)
- Ecuador (13)
- Egypt (21)
- El Salvador (2)
- Estonia (8)
- Finland (37)
- France (167)
- Germany (237)
- Great Britain (110)
- Greece (15)
- Guatemala (6)
- Haudenosaunee (24)
- Hong Kong (17)
- Hungary (59)
- Iceland (4)
- India (10)
- Indonesia (6)
- Ireland (8)
- Israel (51)
- Italy (185)
- Japan (138)
- Jordan (3)
- Kazakhstan (16)
- Kuwait (4)
- Kyrgyzstan (2)
- Latvia (33)
- Lithuania (11)
- Luxembourg (1)
- Malaysia (5)
- Mauritius (2)
- Mexico (78)
- Moldova (2)
- Mongolia (7)
- Montenegro (3)
- Morocco (10)
- Namibia (1)
- Nepal (2)
- Netherlands (80)
- New Zealand (46)
- North Macedonia (2)
- Norway (28)
- Pakistan (1)
- Panama (26)
- Paraguay (2)
- Peru (4)
- Philippines (9)
- Poland (71)
- Portugal (47)
- Puerto Rico (31)
- Qatar (12)
- Romania (21)
- Senegal (1)
- Serbia (5)
- Singapore (15)
- Slovakia (12)
- Slovenia (18)
- South Africa (21)
- South Korea (30)
- Spain (57)
- Suriname (14)
- Sweden (56)
- Switzerland (102)
- Chinese Taipei (74)
- Thailand (32)
- Tunisia (1)
- Turkey (3)
- Ukraine (105)
- United Arab Emirates (13)
- United States (340) (host)
- Uruguay (2)
- Uzbekistan (5)
- Venezuela (16)
- Vietnam (5)
- Virgin Islands (9)

== Calendar ==
- All dates are in Central Daylight Time (UTC-05:00)

OC	Opening ceremony	●	Event competitions	1	Gold medal events	CC	Closing ceremony

July	7 Thu	8 Fri	9 Sat	10 Sun	11 Mon	12 Tue	13 Wed	14 Thu	15 Fri	16 Sat	17 Sun	Events
Ceremonies	OC										CC	—N/a
Acrobatic gymnastics									2	2	1	5
Aerobic gymnastics						2	2					4
Air sports			●	1	●	1						2
Archery		●	3	●	●	2	●	●	2			7
Artistic roller skating										●	3	3
Beach handball					●	●	●	●	2			2
Billiards sports							●	●	●	2	2	4
Boules sports						2	2					4
Bowling		●	●	●	4							4
Canoe marathon					2	2						4
Canoe polo								●	●	●	2	2
Dancesport		1	2	2								5
Finswimming		8	8									16
Fistball				●	●	●	●	2				2
Floorball		●	●	●	●	1						1
Flying disc						●	●	●	●	1		1
Inline hockey		●	●	●	●	1						1
Ju-jitsu									9	9		18
Karate		6	6									12
Kickboxing (K-1)							●	6				6
Korfball							●	●	●	●	1	1
Lacrosse (women)						●	●	●	●	1		1
Lifesaving				8	8							16
Muay Thai									●	●	12	12
Orienteering									2	2	1	5
Parkour gymnastics				2	2							4
Powerlifting		3	3	2								8
Racquetball				●	●	●	2					2
Rhythmic gymnastics						2	2					4
Road speed skating				4	4							8
Softball			●	●	●	●	1					1
Sport climbing								2	2	2		6
Squash							●	●	●	●	2	2
Sumo			6	2								8
Track speed skating		6	4									10
Trampoline gymnastics									1	1	2	4
Tug of war								1	1	1		3
Water skiing								●	4	4		8
Daily medal events		24	32	21	20	13	9	11	25	25	26	206
Cumulative total		24	56	77	97	110	119	130	155	180	206	
Duathlon^{1}										2	1	3
Flag football^{1}				●	●	●	●	2				2
Lacrosse (men)^{1}		●	●	●	●	1						1
Wheelchair rugby^{1}								●	●	●	1	1
Wushu (taolu)^{1}						5	5					10
Daily medal events			0	0	0	6	5	2	0	2	2	17
Cumulative total			0	0	0	6	11	13	13	15	17	
July	7 Thu	8 Fri	9 Sat	10 Sun	11 Mon	12 Tue	13 Wed	14 Thu	15 Fri	16 Sat	17 Sun	Events

Note

^{1} Optional sports selected by the host organizing committee

== Medal table ==
* Host nation (United States)

Rank	Nation	Gold	Silver	Bronze	Total
1	Germany	24	7	16	47
2	United States*	16	18	10	44
3	Ukraine	16	12	17	45
4	Italy	13	24	12	49
5	France	11	15	16	42
6	Hungary	11	7	9	27
7	Belgium	11	4	5	20
8	Japan	10	11	12	33
9	Colombia	9	10	6	25
10	China	9	4	1	14
11	Israel	7	3	4	14
12	Spain	6	6	7	19
13	Great Britain	6	3	4	13
14	Canada	5	5	5	15
15	Switzerland	5	4	3	12
16	Mexico	5	2	5	12
17	Denmark	4	3	3	10
18	Thailand	4	3	2	9
19	Sweden	3	6	5	14
20	Poland	3	5	7	15
21	Netherlands	3	3	4	10
22	Egypt	3	2	1	6
23	Australia	3	1	2	6
24	Croatia	2	5	0	7
25	Indonesia	2	3	0	5
26	Norway	2	2	1	5
26	Serbia	2	2	1	5
28	Brazil	2	1	5	8
28	United Arab Emirates	2	1	5	8
30	Austria	2	1	1	4
31	Cambodia	2	0	0	2
31	Vietnam	2	0	0	2
33	Chinese Taipei	1	6	6	13
34	Greece	1	3	4	8
34	South Korea	1	3	4	8
36	Portugal	1	3	1	5
37	Kazakhstan	1	2	1	4
38	Slovenia	1	1	3	5
39	Slovakia	1	1	2	4
40	Bulgaria	1	1	1	3
40	New Zealand	1	1	1	3
42	Brunei	1	1	0	2
43	Hong Kong	1	0	4	5
44	Ecuador	1	0	3	4
45	Azerbaijan	1	0	1	2
45	Lithuania	1	0	1	2
47	Algeria	1	0	0	1
47	Costa Rica	1	0	0	1
47	Moldova	1	0	0	1
47	Philippines	1	0	0	1
47	South Africa	1	0	0	1
52	Morocco	0	4	0	4
53	Czech Republic	0	3	3	6
54	Virgin Islands	0	3	1	4
55	Chile	0	2	1	3
55	Venezuela	0	2	1	3
57	Argentina	0	1	2	3
57	Romania	0	1	2	3
57	Singapore	0	1	2	3
60	Finland	0	1	1	2
60	Kyrgyzstan	0	1	1	2
60	Uzbekistan	0	1	1	2
63	Bahrain	0	1	0	1
63	Bosnia and Herzegovina	0	1	0	1
63	Guatemala	0	1	0	1
63	Mongolia	0	1	0	1
63	Peru	0	1	0	1
63	Qatar	0	1	0	1
69	Malaysia	0	0	2	2
70	Bolivia	0	0	1	1
70	India	0	0	1	1
70	Panama	0	0	1	1
70	Tunisia	0	0	1	1
Totals (73 entries)		224	221	222	667

In the Women's 4 × 50 m obstacle relay of the lifesaving competition, two gold medals were awarded and thus no silver medal was awarded. In the Women's 500 m sprint of the track speed skating competition, only the one gold medal was awarded as the remaining competitors in the final were disqualified.

=== Medal design ===
The event's medal design was unveiled in February 2022.

== Community engagement ==
=== The World Games 2022 Experience Delivered by Shipt ===
In March 2019, The World Games 2022 unveiled a mobile experience, designed to generate excitement for the event and educate the local community on the sports of The 2022 Games. The traveling Mercedes Sprinter Van includes a rock climbing wall, a sumo wrestling activity, photo opportunities and an interactive trivia game where guests can win prizes. The van made its official debut at the 15th Annual MortgageBanc Chili Cook-Off on March 2, 2019. It continues to tour throughout 2019, 2020, 2021 and 2022.

=== World of Opportunity ===
In June 2019, The World Games 2022 announced the kickoff of their supplier diversity program, World of Opportunity. The program, which was unveiled to an audience of 400 at the Birmingham CrossPlex, allows certified, diverse businesses to compete for contracts to provide goods and services for The World Games 2022. The categories accepted include (but are not limited to) transportation services, event production, security, promotional items, merchandise, sports equipment, food service, technology, printing, medical supplies, event equipment, waste removal and construction services.

== Broadcasting ==
In July 2021, it was announced that CBS Sports Network would broadcast one-hour highlights shows on each of the ten days of competition, and two additional one-hour specials will be shown on other CBS channels and on Paramount+. Olympic Channel also carried coverage.
