= United States at the 2022 World Games =

- IOC code: USA
- NOC: United States Olympic Committee

in Birmingham, United States 7 July 2022 – 17 July 2022
- Competitors: 340 (183 men and 157 women) in 38 sports
- Medals Ranked 2nd: Gold 16 Silver 18 Bronze 10 Total 44

World Games appearances (overview)
- 1981; 1985; 1989; 1993; 1997; 2001; 2005; 2009; 2013; 2017; 2022; 2025

The United States competed as host country at the 2022 World Games held in Birmingham, United States from 7 to 17 July 2022. Athletes representing the United States won 16 gold medals, 18 silver medals and 10 bronze medals. The country finished in 2nd place in the medal table.

== Medalists ==
The following U.S. competitors won medals at the games. In the by discipline sections below, medalists' names are bolded.

Medal	Name	Sport	Event	Date
Gold	Victor Montalvo	Dancesport	B-Boys	July 10
Gold	Shannon O'Keefe	Bowling	Women's singles	July 11
Gold	Derrick Bunett; Jack Combs; Joseph DiMartino; Peter DiMartino Jr.; Brandon Hawkins; Peter Kavaya; Tyler Kraft; Michael Maczynski; Travis Noe; Brett Onlinger; William Pascalli; Troy Redmann; Garret Ross; Nathan Sigmund	Inline hockey	Men's tournament	July 12
Gold	United States women's national softball team: Monica Abbott; Ally Carda; Charla Echols; Megan Faraimo; Hannah Flippen; Jailyn Ford; Montana Fouts; Kinzie Hansen; Janae Jefferson; Amanda Lorenz; Haylie McCleney; Michelle Moultrie; Dejah Mulipola; Bubba Nickles; Taylor Pleasants	Softball	Women's tournament	July 14
Gold	Emma Hunt	Sport climbing	Women's speed	July 14
Gold	Nate Smith	Water skiing	Men's slalom	July 15
Gold	Adam Pickos	Water skiing	Men's trick	July 15
Gold	Regina Jaquess	Water skiing	Women's slalom	July 15
Gold	Lauren Morgan	Water skiing	Women's jump	July 16
Gold	Claire Chastain; Khalif El-Salaam; Carolyn Finney; Dylan Freechild; Nate Goff; Kaela Helton; Chris Kocher; Grant Lindsley; Sarah Meckstroth; Jimmy Mickle; Carolyn Normile; Opi Payne; Claire Trop; Jack Williams	Flying disc	Mixed tournament	16 July
Gold	Aaron Ortiz	Muaythai	Men's 81 kg	July 17
Gold	Charlsey Maner	Muaythai	Women's 60 kg	July 17
Gold	Kaden Brown	Trampoline gymnastics	Men's tumbling	July 17
Silver	Jeffrey Louis	Dancesport	B-Boys	July 10
Silver	Sunny Choi	Dancesport	B-Girls	July 10
Silver	Bonica Brown	Powerlifting	Women's super heavyweight	July 10
Silver	Julia Bond; Shannon O'Keefe	Bowling	Women's doubles	July 11
Silver	Nick Batsch	Air sports	Canopy piloting	July 12
Silver	Brady Ellison	Archery	Men's recurve individual	July 12
Silver	Rebeka Howe	Boules sports	Women's petanque precision	July 12
Silver	Christina Lyons	Archery	Women's individual barebow	July 15
Silver	Anna Gay	Water skiing	Women's trick	July 15
Silver	Braiden McDougall; Angel Felix	Acrobatic gymnastics	Men's pair	July 16
Silver	United States women's national lacrosse team: Madison Ahern; Kasey Choma; Marge Donovan; Madison Doucette; Haley Hicklen; Ellie Masera; Danielle Pavinelli; Paige Petty; Belle Smith; Sam Swart; Meaghan Tyrrell; Caitlyn Wurzburger	Lacrosse	Women's tournament	July 16
Silver	Miah Bruns	Trampoline gymnastics	Women's tumbling	July 16
Silver	Taylor Garcia	Water skiing	Men's jump	July 16
Silver	Mathew Baker	Muaythai	Men's 91 kg	July 17
Silver	Ashley Thiner	Muaythai	Women's 54 kg	July 17
Silver	Tierra Brandt	Muaythai	Women's 57 kg	July 17
Bronze	Gakuji Tozaki	Karate	Men's kata	July 8
Bronze	Trinity Allen	Karate	Women's 55 kg	July 8
Bronze	Paige Pearce	Archery	Women's compound	July 9
Bronze	Kamran Madani	Karate	Men's kumite 84 kg	July 9
Bronze	Katie Borcherding; Cierra McKown	Acrobatic gymnastics	Women's pair	July 15
Bronze	Ryan Davis	Archery	Men's individual barebow	July 15
Bronze	Taylor McCullough	Water skiing	Women's wakeboard	July 16
Bronze	Jordan Weiland	Muaythai	Men's 71 kg	July 17
Bronze	Janet Garcia Borbon	Muaythai	Women's 48 kg	July 17
Bronze	Erin Clayton	Muaythai	Women's 63.5 kg	July 17

=== Invitational sports ===
Medal	Name	Sport	Event	Date
Gold	Brian Wang	Wushu	Men's jianshu / qiangshu	July 13
Gold	Mia Tian	Wushu	Women's daoshu / gunshu	July 13
Gold	Aamir Brown; Geoffrey Bryan; James Calhoun; Laval Davis; Darrell Doucette; Dezmin Lewis; Bruce Mapp; Jordan Oquendo; David Price; Johnny Rembert; Ladderick Smith; Frankie Solomon	Flag football	Men's tournament	July 14
Silver	United States men's national lacrosse team: Matt Brandau; Liam Byrnes; Ryan Conrad; Adam Ghitelman; Zach Goodrich; Justin Guterding; Colin Heacock; Jack Kelly; Connor Kirst; Tom Schreiber; Brian Tevlin; Ryan Tierney	Lacrosse	Men's tournament	July 12
Silver	Deliah Autry; Nadia Bibbs; Mary Kate Bula; Sheneika Comice; Crystal Daniels; Mariah Gearhart; Vanita Krouch; Joann Overstreet; Ayanna Pate; Michelle Roque; Ashley Whisonant; Crystal Winter	Flag football	Women's tournament	July 14

Medals by sport
Sport	1st place, gold medalist(s)	2nd place, silver medalist(s)	3rd place, bronze medalist(s)	Total
Water skiing	4	2	1	**7**
Muaythai	2	3	3	**8**
Wushu	2	0	0	**2**
Dancesport	1	2	0	**3**
Bowling	1	1	0	**2**
Flag football	1	1	0	**2**
Trampoline gymnastics	1	1	0	**2**
Flying disc	1	0	0	**1**
Inline hockey	1	0	0	**1**
Softball	1	0	0	**1**
Sport climbing	1	0	0	**1**
Archery	0	2	2	**4**
Lacrosse	0	2	0	**2**
Acrobatic gymnastics	0	1	1	**2**
Air sports	0	1	0	**1**
Boules sports	0	1	0	**1**
Powerlifting	0	1	0	**1**
Karate	0	0	3	**3**
Total	16	18	10	44

Medals by gender
Gender	1st place, gold medalist(s)	2nd place, silver medalist(s)	3rd place, bronze medalist(s)	Total
Female	7	11	6	**24**
Male	8	6	4	**18**
Mixed	1	1	0	**2**
Total	16	18	10	44

Multiple medalists
**Name**	**Sport**	1st place, gold medalist(s)	2nd place, silver medalist(s)	3rd place, bronze medalist(s)	**Total**
Shannon O'Keefe	Bowling	1	1	0	**2**

== Competitors ==
The following is the list of number of competitors in the Games.

Sport	Men	Women	Total
Acrobatic gymnastics	2	5	7
Air sports	7	3	10
Archery	6	5	11
Artistic roller skating	2	2	4
Beach handball	10	10	20
Boules sports	0	2	2
Bowling	2	2	4
Canoe marathon	1	1	2
Canoe polo	8	8	16
Cue sports	6	2	8
Dancesport	6	5	11
Duathlon	2	2	4
Finswimming	4	4	8
Fistball	10	10	20
Flag football	12	12	24
Floorball	14	0	14
Flying disc	7	7	14
Inline hockey	14	0	14
Ju-jitsu	3	2	5
Karate	6	6	12
Kickboxing	2	2	4
Lacrosse	12	12	24
Muaythai	6	6	12
Orienteering	2	2	4
Parkour	0	1	1
Powerlifting	2	2	4
Racquetball	2	2	4
Rhythmic gymnastics	—N/a	2	2
Road speed skating Track speed skating	2	2	4
Softball	0	15	15
Sport climbing	4	3	7
Squash	3	2	5
Sumo	10	9	19
Trampoline gymnastics	2	2	4
Water skiing	4	5	9
Wheelchair rugby	8	0	8
Wushu	2	2	4
Total	183	157	340

== Air sports ==
United States competed in air sports.

Drone racing

Athlete	Event	Qualification		Round of 32		Round of 16		Quarterfinal		Semifinal		Repechage 1		Repechage 2		Repechage 3		Repechage 4		Repechage quarterfinal		Repechage semifinal		Final			
Athlete	Event	Time	Rank	Time	Rank	Time	Rank	Time	Rank	Time	Rank	Time	Rank	Time	Rank	Time	Rank	Time	Rank	Time	Rank	Time	Rank	Time	Rank	Time	Rank
Ryan Lessard	Drone racing	31.55456	27	1:34.043272	4 R	Did not advance						-2 lap	4	Did not advance													28
Evan Turner	Drone racing	20.537685	2	1:03.332352	1 Q	1:01.601792	1 Q	1:01.05088	1 Q	DNF		Bye										-2 lap	3	Did not advance			5

Parachuting

Athlete	Event	Round 1				Round 2				Round 3				Total	
Athlete	Event	Accuracy	Distance	Speed	Freestyle	Accuracy	Distance	Speed	Freestyle	Accuracy	Distance	Speed	Freestyle	Points	Rank
Curt Bartholomew	Canopy piloting	1	24	30	18	4	8	1	32	8	15	32	4	178	11
Jeannie Bartholomew	Canopy piloting	17	31	28	33	2	18	28	13	12	26	29	3	240	23
Nicholas Batsch	Canopy piloting	4	3	22	1	7	1	30	1	2	1	1	6	80	2nd place, silver medalist(s)
Robin Jandle	Canopy piloting	17	25	13	30	34	20	19	26	12	7	26	18	245	25
Travis Mills	Canopy piloting	4	6	5	4	19	13	5	12	12	23	2	14	117	4
Justin Price	Canopy piloting	13	21	2	32	11	29	4	7	25	19	32	28	215	19
Matt Shull	Canopy piloting	31	8	10	13	26	32	9	32	27	18	14	25	242	24
Greg Windmiller	Canopy piloting	21	34	30	34	27	31	14	22	28	34	15	15	312	31

== Archery ==
United States competed in archery. American archers competed in each of the archery events.

Barebow/recurve

Athlete	Event	Qualification		Elimination 1	Elimination 2	Elimination 3	Elimination 4	Semifinal	Final / BM	
Athlete	Event	Score	Rank	Opposition Result	Opposition Result	Opposition Result	Opposition Result	Opposition Result	Opposition Result	Rank
Ryan Davis	Men's barebow	305	10	Spinelli (SLO); W 80–70	Molnar (HUN); W 85–76	Jackson (FRA); W 80–74	Garcia (ESP); W 83–80	Pettersson (SWE); L 49–50	Bronze medal final Meyer (GER); W 52–51	3rd place, bronze medalist(s)
Brady Ellison	Men's recurve	388	1	Bye				Huston (GBR); W 64–55	Unruh (GER); L 61–66	2nd place, silver medalist(s)
Matt Nofel	Men's recurve	358	6	Bye		Andersson (SWE); L 79–85	Did not advance			
Christina Lyons	Women's barebow	284	4	Bye			Boscher (GER); W 83–65	Viljanen (FIN); W 43–36	Nozigila (ITA); L 44–48	2nd place, silver medalist(s)
Molly Nugent	Women's recurve	333	6	Bye		Schloesser (NED); W 89–85	Rebagliati (ITA); L 82–92	Did not advance		

Compound

Athlete	Event	Ranking round		Round of 32	Round of 16	Quarterfinals	Semifinals	Final / BM	
Athlete	Event	Score	Seed	Opposition Result	Opposition Result	Opposition Result	Opposition Result	Opposition Result	Rank
Braden Gellenthien	Men's compound	704	11	van Tonder (NZL); W 146–143	Becerra (MEX); L 147–147*	Did not advance			
James Lutz	Men's compound	699	15	Krippendorf (GER); W 145*–145	Perkins (CAN); L 146–148	Did not advance			
Benjamin Thompson	Men's compound	677	24	Verma (IND); L 140–148	Did not advance				
Linda Ochoa-Anderson	Women's compound	704	4	Bye	Mlinarić (CRO); W 145–142	Pearce (USA); L 142–145	Did not advance		
Paige Pearce	Women's compound	704	5	Bye	Prieels (BEL); W 147–146	Ochoa-Anderson (USA); W 145–142	Gibson (GBR); L 146–146*	Bronze medal final Ellison (SLO); W 148–145	3rd place, bronze medalist(s)
Wendy Gardner	Women's compound	633	24	Gibson (GBR); L 131–146	Did not advance				
Linda Ochoa-Anderson; Braden Gellenthien	Mixed compound team	1408	3	—N/a		Netherlands (NED); L 154–158	Did not advance		

== Beach handball ==
United States competed in beach handball.

== Boules sports ==
United States competed in boules sports.

Athlete	Event	Qualification				Group play				Semifinal	Final / BM	
Athlete	Event	Round 1	Round 2	Total	Rank	Opposition Result	Opposition Result	Opposition Result	Rank	Opposition Result	Opposition Result	Rank
Rebeka Howe	Petanque precision	32	31	77	2 Q	—N/a				Wongchuvej (THA); W 38–37	Sreymom (CAM); L 21–41	2nd place, silver medalist(s)
Janice Bissonnette; Rebeka Howe	Petanque doubles	—N/a				Fue Angsanit / Wongchuvej (THA); L 5–13	Barzin / Meskens (BEL); W 13–0	Gabe / Jenal (GER); L 1–13	3	Did not advance		

== Bowling ==
United States competed in bowling.

Athlete	Event	Round of 32	Round of 16	Quarterfinal	Semifinal	Final / BM	
Athlete	Event	Opposition Result	Opposition Result	Opposition Result	Opposition Result	Opposition Result	Rank
Alec Kiplinger	Men's singles	Rodriguez (CRC); W 192–170, 175–267, 212–172	Fach (CAN); L 217–229, 198–226	Did not advance			
Trent Mitchell	Men's singles	Burgos (PUR); W 230–146, 160–187, 236–182	Cooley (AUS); L 233–276, 184–221	Did not advance			
Alec Kiplinger; Trent Mitchell	Men's doubles	—N/a	Ismail/Tan (MAS); W 214–256, 254–212, 245–199	Kim/Park (KOR); L 191–205, 165–233	Did not advance		
Julia Bond	Women's singles	Dammers (ARU); L 176–182, 182–214	Did not advance				
Shannon O'Keefe	Women's singles	Jensen (DEN); W 268–234, 184–155	Commane (AUS); W 235–173, 225–181	Goron (FRA); W 225–194, 192–209, 235–215	Wegner (SWE); W 229–300, 225–174, 218–203	Guerrero (COL); W 279–194, 205–216, 242–225	1st place, gold medalist(s)
Julia Bond; Shannon O'Keefe	Women's doubles	—N/a	Wegner/Wegner (SWE); W 256–176, 225–201	Commane/Martin (AUS); W 220–159, 201–192	Franco/Guerrero (COL); W 236–225, 190–215, 216–190	Guldbaek/Jensen (DEN); L 184–199, 226–182, 177–226	2nd place, silver medalist(s)

== Canoe marathon ==
United States competed in canoe marathon.

Athlete	Event	Heat		Final	
Athlete	Event	Time	Rank	Time	Rank
Jesse Lishchuk	Men's short distance	16:33.00	10	Did not advance	19
Jesse Lishchuk	Men's long distance	—N/a		DNF	
Kaitlyn McElroy	Women's short distance	17:15.24	9	Did not advance	16
Kaitlyn McElroy	Women's long distance	—N/a		1:48:26.51	18

== Canoe polo ==
United States competed in canoe polo.

== Cue sports ==
United States competed in cue sports.

Men

Athlete	Event	Round of 16	Quarterfinal	Semifinal	Final / BM	
Athlete	Event	Opposition Result	Opposition Result	Opposition Result	Opposition Result	Rank
Hunter Lombardo	Nine-ball	Morra (CAN); L 5–11	Did not advance			
Tyler Styer	Nine-ball	Filler (GER); L 10–11	Did not advance			
Shane Van Boening	Nine-ball	Gerson (PER); W 11–5	Filler (GER); L 3–11	Did not advance		
Renat Denkha	Snooker	Neussle (AUT); L 0–3	Did not advance			
Ahmed El Sayed	Snooker	Ramzan (PAK); L 1–3	Did not advance			
Pedro Piedrabuena	Three-cushion billiards	Jaspers (NED); L 11–40	Did not advance			

Women

Athlete	Event	Round of 16	Quarterfinal	Semifinal	Final / BM	
Athlete	Event	Opposition Result	Opposition Result	Opposition Result	Opposition Result	Rank
Jennifer Barretta	Nine-ball	Bryant (CAN); L 8–9	Did not advance			
Monica Webb	Nine-ball	Park (KOR); L 8–9	Did not advance			

== Dancesport ==
United States competed in dancesport.

Breakdancing

Athlete	Event	Group stage				Quarterfinal	Semifinal	Final / BM	
Athlete	Event	Opposition Result	Opposition Result	Opposition Result	Rank	Opposition Result	Opposition Result	Opposition Result	Rank
Morris Isby	B-Boys	Caboni (NED); W 2–0	Civil (FRA); L 0–2	Matias (CHI); L 0–2	2 Q	Montalvo (USA); L 0–2	Did not advance		8
Jeffrey Louis	B-Boys	Montalvo (USA); L 0–2	Dos Santos (BRA); W 2–0	Grindeland (NOR); W 2–0	2 Q	Civil (FRA); W 2–1	Sanchez (ESP); W 4–0	Montalvo (USA); L 1–3	2nd place, silver medalist(s)
Victor Montalvo	B-Boys	Louis (USA); W 2–0	Grindeland (NOR); W 2–0	Dos Santos (BRA); W 2–0	1 Q	Isby (USA); W 2–0	Nakarai (JPN); W 3–1	Louis (USA); W 3–1	1st place, gold medalist(s)
Vicki Chang	B-Girls	Rasul (GER); L 0–2	Sandrini (ITA); L 0–2	Yuasa (JPN); L 0–2	4	Did not advance			16
Sunny Choi	B-Girls	Starus (POL); W 2–0	Blieck (BEL); T 1–1	Van Hoof (BEL); W 2–0	1 Q	Rasul (GER); W 2–0	Liu (CHN); W 3–2	Yuasa (JPN); L 0–4	2nd place, silver medalist(s)

Latin

Athlete	Event	First round							Semifinal							Final						
Athlete	Event	CC	J	PD	R	S	Total	Rank	CC	J	PD	R	S	Total	Rank	CC	J	PD	R	S	Total	Rank
Anastasiya Rubashevsky; Daniel Rubashevsky	Latin	30.67	30.60	30.65	31.25	31.50	154.67	20	Did not advance													

Standard

Athlete	Event	Round 1							Semifinal							Final						
Athlete	Event	QS	SF	T	VW	W	Total	Rank	QS	SF	T	VW	W	Total	Rank	QS	SF	T	VW	W	Total	Rank
Anna Jonczyk; Denis Matveev	Standard	30.58	30.92	30.67	30.83	30.87	153.87	20	Did not advance													
Anna Sheedy; Alexander Munteanu	Standard	33.58	33.83	33.50	33.83	33.50	168.25	11 Q	34.00	33.25	33.33	33.33	33.42	167.33	13	Did not advance						

== Duathlon ==
United States competed in duathlon.

Athlete	Event	Run 1 (10 km)	T1	Bike (40 km)	T2	Run 2 (5 km)	Total time	Rank
Alex Arman	Men's							
Albert Harrison	Men's							
Kari Giles	Women's	LAP						
Deanna Newman	Women's	DSQ						

== Finswimming ==
United States competed in finswimming.

Athlete	Event	Time	Rank
Drew Modrov	Men's 50 m bi-fins	19.66	7
Edward McLawson; Drew Modrov; Santiago Mora; Nicholas Restrepo	Men's 4 × 50 m surface relay	1:15.79	7
Edward McLawson; Drew Modrov; Santiago Mora; Nicholas Restrepo	Men's 4 × 100 m surface relay	3:03.04	7
Julia Golovina; Sofia Hernandez; Sofia Osorio Gomez; Alix Rubio	Women's 4 × 50 m surface relay	1:26.31	8
Julia Golovina; Sofia Hernandez; Sofia Osorio Gomez; Alix Rubio	Women's 4 × 100 m surface relay	3:27.33	8

== Fistball ==
United States competed in fistball.

== Flag football ==
United States won two medals in flag football.

== Floorball ==
United States competed in the floorball tournament.

Summary

Team	Event	Preliminary round				Semifinal	Final / BM / PF	
Team	Event	Opposition Result	Opposition Result	Opposition Result	Rank	Opposition Result	Opposition Result	Rank
United States men	Men's tournament	Czech Republic; L 1–13	Canada; L 3–9	Finland; L 0–16	4	Did not advance	7th place final Thailand; L 3–7	8

Group play

Pos	Team	Pld	W	D	L	GF	GA	GD	Pts	Qualification
1	Finland	3	3	0	0	39	3	+36	6	Semifinals
2	Czech Republic	3	2	0	1	33	6	+27	4	Semifinals
3	Canada	3	1	0	2	9	38	−29	2	Fifth place game
4	United States (H)	3	0	0	3	4	38	−34	0	Seventh place game

Source: IFF
(H) Hosts

8 July 2022; 18:15	Czech Republic	13–1 (3–0, 6–0, 4–1)	United States	BJCC East Exhibition Hall, Birmingham; Attendance: 179

IFF

9 July 2022; 18:00	United States	3–9 (0–2, 1–2, 2–5)	Canada	BJCC East Exhibition Hall, Birmingham; Attendance: 703

IFF

10 July 2022; 18:00	United States	0–16 (0–6, 0–6, 0–4)	Finland	BJCC East Exhibition Hall, Birmingham; Attendance: 228

IFF

Seventh place game

11 July 2022; 15:00	United States	3–7 (2–5, 1–1, 0–1)	Thailand	BJCC East Exhibition Hall, Birmingham; Attendance: 163

IFF

== Flying disc ==
United States won the gold medal in the flying disc competition.

== Gymnastics ==
=== Acrobatic ===
United States won two medals in acrobatic gymnastics.

Athlete	Event	Qualification				Final	
Athlete	Event	Balance	Dynamic	Total	Rank	Score	Rank
Angel Felix; Braiden McDougall	Men's pair	28.550	28.100	56.650	2 Q	28.750	2nd place, silver medalist(s)
Katherine Borcherding; Cierra McKown	Women's pair	27.550	26.050	53.600	3 Q	27.120	3rd place, bronze medalist(s)
Isabel Chang; Sydney Martin; Maria Wooden	Women's group	27.530	27.170	54.700	5	Did not advance	

=== Rhythmic ===
United States competed in rhythmic gymnastics.

Athlete	Event	Qualification		Final	
Athlete	Event	Score	Rank	Score	Rank
Evita Griskenas	Ball	29.850	9	Did not advance	
Lili Mizuno	Ball	29.650	10 q	29.650	8
Evita Griskenas	Clubs	29.850	11	Did not advance	
Lili Mizuno	Clubs	28.100	18	Did not advance	
Evita Griskenas	Hoop	32.300	6 Q	29.600	7
Lili Mizuno	Hoop	30.400	11	Did not advance	
Evita Griskenas	Ribbon	30.700	6 Q	30.650	5
Lili Mizuno	Ribbon	30.300	7 Q	28.250	7

=== Trampoline ===
United States won two medals in trampoline gymnastics.

Athlete	Event	Qualification		Final 1		Final 2	
Athlete	Event	Score	Rank	Score	Rank	Score	Rank
Ruben Padilla	Men's double mini-trampoline	61.000	1 Q	29.600	1 Q	24.000	4
Kaden Brown	Men's tumbling						
Tristan Van Natta	Women's double mini-trampoline						
Miah Bruns	Women's tumbling						

== Inline hockey ==
United States competed in the inline hockey tournament.

== Ju-jitsu ==
United States competed in ju-jitsu.

Athlete	Event	Elimination round			Round of 16	Quarterfinal	Semifinal	Repechage 1	Repechage 2	Final / BM	
Athlete	Event	Opposition Result	Opposition Result	Rank	Opposition Result	Opposition Result	Opposition Result	Opposition Result	Opposition Result	Opposition Result	Rank
Carlos Velasquez	Men's ne-waza 69 kg	Dabush (ISR); L 0–14	Al Suwaidi (UAE); L 0–14	3	—N/a		Did not advance	—N/a		Did not advance	
Kim Edmund	Men's ne-waza 77 kg	Henek (POL); L 0–0	Ryeder (ISR); W 14–0	1 Q	—N/a		Munfaredi (BRN); L 0–14	—N/a		Bronze medal final Sheehan (CAN); L 0–14	4
Elioenai de Abreu Campos	Men's ne-waza 85 kg	—N/a				Shemesh (ISR); L 0–4	Did not advance	Kozak (POL); L 0–14	Did not advance		
Elioenai de Abreu Campos	Men's ne-waza open	—N/a			Bye	Shemesh (ISR); L 0–6	Did not advance	—N/a		Did not advance	
Ashley Matan	Women's ne-waza 57 kg	Fouillat (FRA); L 0–14	Ramirez (PHI); L 0–14	3	—N/a		Did not advance	—N/a		Did not advance	
Tainara Weidgenand	Women's ne-waza 63 kg	Povsnar (SLO); L 0–14	Golub (UKR); L 0–14	3	—N/a		Did not advance	—N/a		Did not advance	
Tainara Weidgenand	Women's ne-waza open	—N/a				Rosenfeld (ISR); L 0–14	Did not advance	—N/a		Did not advance	
Elioenai de Abreu Campos; Kim Edmund; Ashley Matan; Tainara Weidgenand	Mixed team	—N/a			Bye	Denmark (DEN); L 0–4	Did not advance	—N/a		Did not advance	

== Karate ==
United States competed in karate.

Men

Athlete	Event	Elimination round				Semifinal	Final / BM	
Athlete	Event	Opposition Result	Opposition Result	Opposition Result	Rank	Opposition Result	Opposition Result	Rank
Gakuji Tozaki	Kata	Heydarov (AZE); W 25.40–23.46	Cención (PAN); W 25.46–24.00	Moto (JPN); L 25.94–26.46	2 Q	Quintero (ESP); L 25.86–26.26	Busato (ITA); W 26.20–25.92	3rd place, bronze medalist(s)
Frank Ruiz	Kumite 60 kg	Assadilov (KAZ); W 3–0	Crescenzo (ITA); L 1–5	Ayoub Anis (ALG); L 1–3	4	Did not advance		7
Josue Hernandez	Kumite 67 kg	Velozo (CHI); L 0–1	Tadissi (HUN); L 0–1	Maresca (ITA); L 1–9	4	Did not advance		7
Thomas Scott	Kumite 75 kg	Otabolaev (UZB); D 1–1	Hárspataki (HUN); W 2–0	Hsu (TPE); W 3–2	1 Q	Abdelaziz (EGY); L 5–10	Otabolaev (UZB); L 1–2	4
Kamran Madani	Kumite 84 kg	Kvesić (CRO); W 2–1	Huaiquimán (CHI); L 3–7	Da Costa (FRA); W 4–2	1 Q	Ech-chaabi (MAR); L 2–5	Kvesić (CRO); W 4–0	3rd place, bronze medalist(s)
Brian Irr	Kumite +84 kg	Tarek (EGY); L 4–5	Daniel (AUS); W 3–0	Kvesić (CRO); W 2–0	3	Did not advance		5

Women

Athlete	Event	Elimination round				Semifinal	Final / BM	
Athlete	Event	Opposition Result	Opposition Result	Opposition Result	Rank	Opposition Result	Opposition Result	Rank
Sakura Kokumai	Kata	Lau (HKG); L 24.32–24.94	Ono (JPN); L 24.00–25.46	Ismail (EGY); W 24.40–24.38	3	Did not advance		5
Eva Alexander	Kumite 50 kg	Gu (TPE); L 0–2	Kryva (UKR); W 3–1	Miyahara (JPN); L 1–1	3	Did not advance		5
Trinity Allen	Kumite 55 kg	Campbell (CAN); W 8–1	Messerschmidt (GER); W 1–0	Youssef (EGY); D 0–0	2 Q	Terliuga (UKR); L 1–8	Warling (LUX); W 6–0	3rd place, bronze medalist(s)
Christina Klinepeter	Kumite 61 kg	Serogina (UKR); L 2–7	Snel (NED); L 0–9	Ali (EGY); L 0–9	4	Did not advance		7
Skylar Lingl	Kumite 68 kg	Bratic (CAN); W 3–2	Buchinger (AUT); L 0–2	Semeraro (ITA); L 0–3	3	Did not advance		5
Cirrus Lingl	Kumite +68 kg	Šáchová (CZE); W 3–1	Berultseva (KAZ); L 1–4	Torres (ESP); L 0–4	3	Did not advance		5

== Kickboxing ==
United States competed in kickboxing.

Athlete	Event	Quarterfinal	Semifinal	Final / BM	
Athlete	Event	Opposition Result	Opposition Result	Opposition Result	Rank
Austin Bybee	Men's 75 kg	Moshe (ISR); L 0–3	Did not advance		
Eryk Anders	Men's +91 kg	Rajabzadeh (AZE); L WO	Did not advance		
Lillie Helton	Women's 52 kg	Cohen (ISR); L 0–3	Did not advance		
Amanda Ginski	Women's 70 kg	Meijer (NED); L 1–2	Did not advance		

== Lacrosse ==
United States won the silver medal in both the men's and women's lacrosse tournaments.

Summary

Team	Event	Preliminary round				Semifinal	Final / BM	
Team	Event	Opposition Result	Opposition Result	Opposition Result	Rank	Opposition Result	Opposition Result	Rank
United States men	Men's tournament	Germany; W 27–10	Great Britain; W 17–9	Australia; W 19–10	1 Q	Japan; W 17–12	Canada; L 9–23	2nd place, silver medalist(s)
United States women	Women's tournament	Australia; W 16–6	Japan; W 16–10	Czech Republic; W 25–6	1 Q	Great Britain; W 21–5	Canada; L 12–14	2nd place, silver medalist(s)

== Muaythai ==
United States competed in muaythai.

Men

Athlete	Event	Quarterfinal	Semifinal	Final / BM	
Athlete	Event	Opposition Result	Opposition Result	Opposition Result	Rank
Austin Amell	–57 kg	Zakzook (JOR); L 0–0 RSC	Did not advance		
Joe Mueller	–63.5 kg	Kwon (KOR); W 29–28	Liubchenko (UKR); L 27–30	Bronze medal final Samir (UAE); L 9–10	4
Travis Petralba	–67 kg	Speth (HUN); L 17–20	Did not advance		
Jordan Weiland	–71 kg	Bye	Yefimenko (UKR); L 27–30	Bronze medal final Zahidi (MAR); W WO	3rd place, bronze medalist(s)
Aaron Ortiz	–81 kg	Agathe (MRI); W WO	Hbibali (UAE); W 30–27	Calado (POR); W 29–28	1st place, gold medalist(s)
Mathew Baker	–91 kg	Klauda (CZE); W 29–28	Radosz (POL); W 30–27	Pryimachov (UKR); L 27–30	2nd place, silver medalist(s)

Women

Athlete	Event	Quarterfinal	Semifinal	Final / BM	
Athlete	Event	Opposition Result	Opposition Result	Opposition Result	Rank
Janet Garcia Borbon	–48 kg	Kakkonen (FIN); W 29–28	Kulinich (UKR); L 28–29	Bronze medal final Medina (ESP); W WO	3rd place, bronze medalist(s)
Angela Bahr	–51 kg	Chochlikova (SVK); L 28–29	Did not advance		
Ashley Thiner	–54 kg	Bulinova (CZE); W 30–27	Schmidt (AUS); W 30–27	Melillo (ITA); L 28–29	2nd place, silver medalist(s)
Tierra Brandt	–57 kg	Bye	Tsang (HKG); W 30–27	Barlow (GBR); L 28–29	2nd place, silver medalist(s)
Charlsey Maner	–60 kg	Scheucher (AUT); W 30–27	Sandorfi (HUN); W 29–28	Block (ISR); W 30–27	1st place, gold medalist(s)
Erin Clayton	–63.5 kg	Bye	Putorak (AUS); L 27–30	Wankrue (THA); W 30–27	3rd place, bronze medalist(s)

== Orienteering ==
United States competed in orienteering.

Athlete	Event	Time	Rank
Greg Ahlswede	Men's sprint	17:43.00	32
Joseph Barrett	Men's sprint	17:05.00	29
Greg Ahlswede	Men's middle distance	47:47	30
Joseph Barrett	Men's middle distance	44:21	27
Alison Campbell	Women's sprint	20:44.00	31
Alison Crocker	Women's sprint	17:54.00	24
Alison Campbell	Women's middle distance	1:02:32	27
Alison Crocker	Women's middle distance	52:00	23

== Parkour ==
United States competed in parkour.

Athlete	Event	Qualification		Final	
Athlete	Event	Result	Rank	Result	Rank
Reagan Anderson	Women's freestyle	15.0	5 Q	16.0	5
Reagan Anderson	Women's speedrun	39.80	5 Q	39.57	5

== Powerlifting ==
United States competed in powerlifting.

Athlete	Event	Squat		Bench press		Deadlift		Total		
Athlete	Event	Result	Rank	Result	Rank	Result	Rank	Result	Points	Rank
Noah Johnson	Men's heavyweight	382.5	7	210.0	10	327.5	4	920.0	100.31	6
Steve Mann	Men's super heavyweight	387.5	11	300.0	8	305.0	10	992.5	96.00	7
Bonica Brown	Women's super heavyweight	322.5	1	215.0	3	247.5	1	785.0	108.48	2nd place, silver medalist(s)

== Racquetball ==
United States competed in racquetball.

Athlete	Event	Round of 16	Quarterfinal	Semifinal	Final / BM	
Athlete	Event	Opposition Result	Opposition Result	Opposition Result	Opposition Result	Rank
Jake Bredenbeck	Men's singles	Connell (CAN); W 15–14, 15–5, 15–12	Parrilla (MEX); L 8–15, 12–15, 10–15	Did not advance		=5
Alejandro Landa	Men's singles	Tynan (IRL); W 15–8, 15–9, 15–4	Montoya (MEX); L 7–15, 8–15, 15–11, 10–15	Did not advance		=5
Kelani Lawrence	Women's singles	Haverty (IRL); W 15–0, 15–8, 15–3	Salas (MEX); L 14–15, 15—13, 15–10, 6–15, 9–11	Did not advance		=5
Rhonda Rajsich	Women's singles	Hickey (IRL) 'W 15–1, 15–2, 15–7	Martínez (GUA); L 8–15, 9–15, 8–15	Did not advance		=5

== Roller skating ==
=== Artistic ===
United States competed in artistic roller skating.

Athlete	Event	SP / SD		FS / FD		Total	
Athlete	Event	Score	Rank	Score	Rank	Score	Rank
Collin Motley	Men's singles	35.35	8				
Ashley Clifford	Women's singles	44.89	6				
Madison Kellis; Raphael Amador	Pairs	38.40	4				

=== Road ===
United States competed in road speed skating.

Athlete	Event	Heat		Quarterfinal		Semifinal		Final	
Athlete	Event	Time	Rank	Time	Rank	Time	Rank	Result	Rank
James Sadler	Men's 100 m	10.796	1	Did not advance					13
James Sadler	Men's 1 lap	1:08.29	3 q	—N/a		1:11.48	4	Did not advance	8
Michael Garcia	Men's 10,000 m point race	—N/a						0	7
Michael Garcia	Men's 15,000 m elimination race	—N/a						EL	13
Jazzmyn Foster	Women's 100 m	11.357	1 q	11.492	2	Did not advance			8
Jazzmyn Foster	Women's 1 lap	1:14.06	3	—N/a		Did not advance			11
Kelsey Rodgers	Women's 10,000 m point race	—N/a						0	14
Kelsey Rodgers	Women's 15,000 m elimination race	—N/a						EL	13

=== Track ===
United States competed in track speed skating.

Men

Athlete	Event	Qualification		Heat		Semifinal		Final	
Athlete	Event	Time	Rank	Time	Rank	Time	Rank	Result	Rank
James Sadler	200 m time trial	19.277	13	—N/a				Did not advance	
James Sadler	500 m sprint	—N/a		45.145	5	Did not advance			13
James Sadler	1000 m sprint	—N/a		1:28.276	7	Did not advance			24
Michael Garcia	1000 m sprint	—N/a		1:28.446	6	Did not advance			25
Michael Garcia	10,000 m elimination race	—N/a						EL	
Michael Garcia	10,000 m points race	—N/a						DNF	

Women

Athlete	Event	Qualification		Heat		Semifinal		Final	
Athlete	Event	Time	Rank	Time	Rank	Time	Rank	Result	Rank
Jazzmyn Foster	200 m time trial	20.299	11	—N/a				Did not advance	
Jazzmyn Foster	500 m sprint	—N/a		46.868	3	Did not advance			11
Jazzmyn Foster	1000 m sprint	—N/a		1:33.813	6	Did not advance			23
Kelsey Rodgers	1000 m sprint	—N/a		1:33.542	5	Did not advance			21
Kelsey Rodgers	10,000 elimination race	—N/a						EL	
Kelsey Rodgers	10,000 m points race	—N/a						DNF	

== Softball ==
United States won the softball tournament.

Summary

Team	Event	Group play				Semifinal	Final / BM	
Team	Event	Opposition Result	Opposition Result	Opposition Result	Rank	Opposition Result	Opposition Result	Rank
United States women	Women's tournament	Italy; W 6–0	Chinese Taipei; W 7–0	Canada; W 10–0	1 Q	Australia; W 5–0	Japan; W 3–2	1st place, gold medalist(s)

== Sport climbing ==
United States competed in sport climbing.

Boulder

Athlete	Event	Qualification			Final		
Athlete	Event	Top	Zone	Rank	Top	Zone	Rank
Joe Goodacre	Men's boulder	0	2	11	Did not advance		
Cloe Coscoy	Women's boulder	2	4	9	Did not advance		
Kylie Cullen	Women's boulder	4	4	2 Q	1	4	5

Lead

Athlete	Event	Qualification			Final		
Athlete	Event	Holds	Time	Rank	Holds	Time	Rank
Jesse Grupper	Men's lead	38+	–	1 Q			
Cloe Coscoy	Women's lead	26+	–	10	Did not advance		

Speed

Athlete	Event	Qualification		Quarterfinal	Semifinal	Final / BM	
Athlete	Event	Time	Rank	Opposition Result	Opposition Result	Opposition Result	Rank
Noah Bratschi	Men's speed	6.117	9	Did not advance			
John Brosler	Men's speed	5.431	3 Q	Khaibullin (KAZ); L 5.92–5.61	Did not advance		5
Emma Hunt	Women's speed	7.303	2 Q	Ulzhabayeva (KAZ); W 7.49–X	Ritter (GER); W 7.16–7.40	Kałucka (POL); W 7.24–8.88	1st place, gold medalist(s)

== Squash ==
United States competed in squash.

Athlete	Event	Round of 32	Round of 16 / CR	Quarterfinal / CQ	Semifinal / CS	Final / BM / CF	
Athlete	Event	Opposition Result	Opposition Result	Opposition Result	Opposition Result	Opposition Result	Rank
Christopher Gordon	Men's singles	Dowling (AUS); L 5–11, 8–11	Did not advance	Classification round Pollan (ESP); W 13–11, 11–7	Classification round Jarota (POL); W 11–7, 11–3, 11–2	Consolation final Farkas (HUN); L 3–11, 7–11, 3–11	=17
Faraz Khan	Men's singles	Pollan (ESP); W 11–7, 11–6	Baillargeon (CAN); L 11–9, 10–12, 5–11	Did not advance			=9
Shahjahan Khan	Men's singles	Rodrigues (BRA); W 14–12, 11–8	White (AUS); W 11–5, 11–9	Crouin (FRA); L 11–8, 11–13, 3–11	Did not advance		=5
Haley Mendez	Women's singles	Herring (JPN); W 11–2, 11–13, 11–6	Tyma (POL); W 7–11, 11–3, 11–7	Alvès (FRA); W 6–11, 11–4, 11–9	Beecroft (GBR); L 8–11, 3–11, 6–11	Bronze medal final Aumard (FRA); L 6–11, 11–5, 9–11, 11–6, 8–11	4
Marina Stefanoni	Women's singles	Tovar (COL); W 11–9, 11–3	Watanabe (JPN); W 14–12, 11–7	Gillis (BEL); L 5–11, 7–11	Did not advance		=5

== Sumo ==
United States competed in sumo.

Men

Athlete	Event	Round of 64	Round of 32	Round of 16	Quarterfinal	Semifinal	Repechage 1	Repechage 2	Repechage 3	Repechage 4	Repechage 5	Final / BM	
Athlete	Event	Opposition Result	Opposition Result	Opposition Result	Opposition Result	Opposition Result	Opposition Result	Opposition Result	Opposition Result	Opposition Result	Opposition Result	Opposition Result	Rank
Justin Kizzart	Lightweight	—N/a		Karachenko (UKR); L	Did not advance		Svensson (NOR); L	Did not advance		—N/a		Did not advance	
Justin Jones	Lightweight	—N/a		Szilagyi (HUN); L	Did not advance					—N/a		Did not advance	
Trent Sabo	Lightweight	—N/a		Khliusin (UKR); L	Did not advance					—N/a		Did not advance	
Eric Huynh	Middleweight	—N/a		Perez (ECU); L	Did not advance					—N/a		Did not advance	
Jordan Karst	Middleweight	—N/a		Rivas (VEN); L	Did not advance		Baasandori (MGL); W	Luto (POL); L	Did not advance	—N/a		Did not advance	
Andrew Roden	Middleweight	—N/a		Rozum (POL); L	Did not advance					—N/a		Did not advance	
Angel de la Torre	Heavyweight	—N/a		Junior (BRA); L	Did not advance					—N/a		Did not advance	
Gilberto de la Torre	Heavyweight	—N/a		Obiad (EGY); L	Did not advance		Kerstner (HUN); L	Did not advance		—N/a		Did not advance	
Robert Fuimaono	Heavyweight	—N/a		Hanada (JPN); L	Did not advance		Piersiak (POL); L	Did not advance		—N/a		Did not advance	
Roy Sims	Heavyweight	—N/a		Perez (VEN); L	Did not advance					—N/a		Did not advance	
Angel de la Torre	Openweight	Svensson (NOR); W	Piersiak (POL); L	Did not advance									
Gilberto de la Torre	Openweight	Nakamura (JPN); L	Did not advance				Salles (BRA); W	Semykras (UKR); L	Did not advance				
Robert Fuimaono	Openweight	Kerstner (HUN); L	Did not advance										
Eric Huynh	Openweight	Igarashi (JPN); W	Luto (POL); L	Did not advance									
Justin Jones	Openweight	Fukano (JPN); L	Did not advance										
Jordan Karst	Openweight	Hanada (JPN); W	Obaid (EGY); W	Junior (BRA); L	Did not advance								
Justin Kizzart	Openweight	Daiauri (UKR); L	Did not advance										
Andrew Roden	Openweight	Veresiuk (UKR); L	Did not advance				Riihioja (FIN); W	Rozum (POL); W	Fujisawa (JPN); W	Semykras (UKR); L	Did not advance		
Trent Sabo	Openweight	Huang (TPE); L	Did not advance										
Roy Sims	Openweight	Bye	Semykras (UKR); L	Did not advance									

Women

Athlete	Event	Round of 64	Round of 32	Round of 16	Quarterfinal	Semifinal	Repechage 1	Repechage 2	Repechage 3	Repechage 4	Repechage 5	Final / BM	
Athlete	Event	Opposition Result	Opposition Result	Opposition Result	Opposition Result	Opposition Result	Opposition Result	Opposition Result	Opposition Result	Opposition Result	Opposition Result	Opposition Result	Rank
Ketzel Jefferson-Vandusen	Lightweight	—N/a		Duzhenko (UKR); L	Did not advance		Andrzejak (POL); L	Did not advance		—N/a		Did not advance	
Liesel Rickhoff	Lightweight	—N/a		Santillan (ARG); L	Did not advance					—N/a		Did not advance	
Elizabeth Salazar	Lightweight	—N/a		Steinmetz (GER); L	Did not advance					—N/a		Did not advance	
Jenni Crook	Middleweight	—N/a		Kolesnik (UKR); L	Did not advance		Matsumoto (JPN); L	Did not advance		—N/a		Did not advance	
Helen Delpopolo	Middleweight	—N/a		Ishii (JPN); L	Did not advance		Amnuaypol (THA); L	Did not advance		—N/a		Did not advance	
Christina Griffin-Jones	Middleweight	—N/a		Skrainowska (POL); L	Did not advance					—N/a		Did not advance	
Eros Armstrong	Heavyweight	—N/a		Vituteerasan (THA); W	Kon (JPN); W	Berezovska (UKR); L	Bye		Hisano (JPN); L	—N/a		Did not advance	
Kellyann Ball	Heavyweight	—N/a		Yu (TPE); L	Did not advance					—N/a		Did not advance	
Yaleidy Galindo	Heavyweight	—N/a		Schulze (GER); W	Tsaruk (UKR); L	Did not advance	Bum-Erdene (MGL); L	Did not advance		—N/a		Did not advance	
Eros Armstrong	Openweight	Kon (JPN); L	Did not advance										
Kellyann Au Ball	Openweight	Bye	Tsaruk (UKR); W	Matsumoto (JPN); L	Did not advance								
Jenni Crook	Openweight	Kolesnik (UKR); L	Did not advance				Higuchi (BRA); L	Did not advance					
Helen Delpopolo	Openweight	Bye	Okutomi (JPN); L	Did not advance									
Yaleidy Galindo	Openweight	Bye	Pelegrini (BRA); L	Did not advance									
Christina Griffin-Jones	Openweight	Skiba (POL); L	Did not advance										
Ketzel Jefferson-Vandusen	Openweight	Duzhenko (UKR); W	Yu (TPE); L	Did not advance									
Liesel Rickhoff	Openweight	Jorgensen (NOR); L	Did not advance										
Elizabeth Salazar	Openweight	Skrainowska (POL); L	Did not advance										

== Water skiing ==
United States competed in water skiing.

Men

Athlete	Event	Qualification		Quarterfinal		Repechage		Semifinal		Final	
Athlete	Event	Result	Rank	Result	Rank	Result	Rank	Result	Rank	Result	Rank
Taylor Garcia	Jump	62.7	1 Q	—N/a						63.9	2nd place, silver medalist(s)
Nate Smith	Slalom	3.00/58/10.75	2 Q	—N/a						5.00/58/10.75	1st place, gold medalist(s)
Adam Pickos	Trick	11040	2 Q	—N/a						11290	1st place, gold medalist(s)
Jake Pelot	Wakeboard	—N/a		64.78	3 Q	Bye		37.67	5	Did not advance	

Women

Athlete	Event	Qualification		Repechage		Semifinal		Final	
Athlete	Event	Result	Rank	Result	Rank	Result	Rank	Result	Rank
Lauren Morgan	Jump	49.8	1 Q	—N/a				52.7	1st place, gold medalist(s)
Regina Jaquess	Slalom	1.00/55/10.75	1 Q	—N/a				6.00/55/11.25	1st place, gold medalist(s)
Anna Gay	Trick	9190	2 Q	—N/a				9190	2nd place, silver medalist(s)
Taylor McCullough	Wakeboard	—N/a		58.45	2 Q	Bye		56.22	3rd place, bronze medalist(s)
Taylor Mikacich	Wakeboard	—N/a		52.22	4 R	69.00	1 Q	49.89	5

== Wheelchair rugby ==
United States competed in wheelchair rugby.

Summary

Team	Event	Preliminary round						Final / BM / PF	
Team	Event	Opposition Result	Opposition Result	Opposition Result	Opposition Result	Opposition Result	Rank	Opposition Result	Rank
United States	Mixed tournament	Japan; L 14–50	Great Britain; L 12–47	Germany; L 15–59	Canada; L 28–45	Switzerland; L 30–40	6	5th place final Switzerland; L 32–34	6

== Wushu ==
United States competed in wushu.

Athlete	Event	Apparatus 1		Apparatus 2		Total	
Athlete	Event	Score	Rank	Score	Rank	Score	Rank
Alex Ni	Men's changquan	9.013	4	—N/a			
Brian Wang	Men's jianshu / qiangshu	9.523	1	9.503	1	19.026	1st place, gold medalist(s)
Mia Tian	Women's daoshu / gunshu	9.303	2	9.487	1	18.790	1st place, gold medalist(s)
Judy Liu	Women's taijijian / taijiquan	DNS					
