= Archery at the 2022 World Games – Women's individual recurve =

Women's individual recurve at the 2022 World Games
- Venue: Avondale Park Historic District, Birmingham, United States
- Dates: 10–12 July
- Competitors: 12 from 11 nations

Medalists
gold medal	Chiara Rebagliati	Italy
silver medal	Bryony Pitman	Great Britain
bronze medal	Elisa Tartler	Germany

The women's individual recurve archery competition at the 2022 World Games took place from 10 to 12 July 2022 at the Avondale Park Historic District in Birmingham, United States.

== Results ==
=== Ranking round ===
Rank	Archer	Nation	Score	6s	5s
1	Elisa Tartler	Germany	366	25	29
2	Bryony Pitman	Great Britain	353	19	27
3	Chiara Rebagliati	Italy	352	24	21
4	Jindřiška Vaněčková	Czech Republic	335	13	28
5	Lauréna Villard	France	334	20	16
6	Molly Nugent	United States	333	16	22
7	Gaby Schloesser	Netherlands	331	15	24
8	Urška Čavič	Slovenia	325	12	21
9	Daniela Klesmann	Germany	324	15	27
10	Denisa Baránková	Slovakia	323	15	27
11	Erika Jangnäs	Sweden	314	11	18
12	Valentine de Giuli	Switzerland	313	10	17

=== Elimination round ===
Pool A

Match 1
Denisa Baránková (SVK)	86
Erika Jangnäs (SWE)	75

Match 2
Gaby Schloesser (NED)	85
Denisa Baránková (SVK)	81

Match 3
Molly Nugent (USA)	89
Gaby Schloesser (NED)	85

Match 4
Chiara Rebagliati (ITA)	97
Molly Nugent (USA)	82

Pool B

Match 1
Valentine de Giuli (SUI)	77
Daniela Klesmann (GER)	73

Match 2
Valentine de Giuli (SUI)	85
Urška Čavič (SLO)	88

Match 3
Urška Čavič (SLO)	88
Lauréna Villard (FRA)	76

Match 4
Urška Čavič (SLO)	87
Jindřiška Vaněčková (CZE)	78

=== Finals ===
Semi-finals
Elisa Tartler (GER)	57
Chiara Rebagliati (ITA)	61
Urška Čavič (SLO)	53
Bryony Pitman (GBR)	56

Gold medal match
Chiara Rebagliati (ITA)	64
Bryony Pitman (GBR)	53
Bronze medal match
Elisa Tartler (GER)	57
Urška Čavič (SLO)	53
