= Archery at the 2022 World Games – Women's individual compound =

Women's individual compound at the 2022 World Games
- Venue: Avondale Park Historic District, Birmingham, United States
- Dates: 8–9 July
- Competitors: 24 from 17 nations

Medalists
gold medal	Ella Gibson	Great Britain
silver medal	Sara López	Colombia
bronze medal	Paige Pearce	United States

The women's individual compound archery competition at the 2022 World Games took place from 8 to 9 July 2022 at the Avondale Park Historic District in Birmingham, United States.

== Competition format ==
A total of 24 athletes entered the competition. Ranking round was held to determine seeding. Athletes competed in single-elimination tournament.

== Results ==
=== Ranking round ===
Rank	Archer	Nation	Score	10s	Xs
1	Tanja Gellenthien	Denmark	708	60	26
2	Sara López	Colombia	706	58	29
3	Toja Ellison	Slovenia	706	58	29
4	Linda Ochoa-Anderson	United States	704	59	21
5	Paige Pearce	United States	704	56	23
6	Jyothi Surekha Vennam	India	702	54	27
7	Muskan Kirar	India	700	53	19
8	Elizabeth Randle	New Zealand	699	53	20
9	Ella Gibson	Great Britain	699	52	23
10	Paola Ramírez	Puerto Rico	697	50	16
11	Sofía Paiz	El Salvador	696	50	22
12	Sarah Prieels	Belgium	694	47	18
13	Amanda Mlinarić	Croatia	693	47	18
14	Jody Beckers	Netherlands	691	45	19
15	Jeanine van Kradenburg	South Africa	690	44	12
16	Andrea Muñoz	Spain	688	43	18
17	Sim Soo-in	South Korea	685	41	19
18	Sanne de Laat	Netherlands	685	39	15
19	Andrea Becerra	Mexico	683	40	22
20	Ryu Ye-in	South Korea	679	40	17
21	Mariana Zúñiga	Chile	675	37	18
22	Lisa Walker	New Zealand	673	33	13
23	Gerda Roux	South Africa	659	26	12
24	Wendy Gardner	United States	633	24	4

=== Competition bracket ===
Round of 32; 8 July
17	Sim (KOR)	141
16	Muñoz (ESP)	143
9	Gibson (GBR)	146
24	Gardner (USA)	131
21	Zúñiga (CHI)	135
12	Prieels (BEL)	136
13	Mlinarić (CRO)	139
20	Ryu (KOR)	133
19	Becerra (MEX)	147
14	Beckers (NED)	137
11	Paiz (ESA)	146
22	Walker (NZL)	134
23	Roux (RSA)	133
10	Ramírez (PUR)	142
15	Van Kradenburg (RSA)	142
18	De Laat (NED)	143

Round of 16; 8 July
1	Gellenthien (DEN)	147
16	Muñoz (ESP)	141
9	Gibson (GBR)	148
8	Randle (NZL)	143
5	Pearce (USA)	147
12	Prieels (BEL)	146
13	Mlinarić (CRO)	142
4	Ochoa-Anderson (USA)	145
3	Ellison (SLO)	144
19	Becerra (MEX)	143
11	Paiz (ESA)	143
6	Vennam (IND)	149
7	Kirar (IND)	146
10	Ramírez (PUR)	145
18	De Laat (NED)	145
2	López (COL)	148

Quarterfinals; 8 July
1	Gellenthien (DEN)	147
9	Gibson (GBR)	150
5	Pearce (USA)	145
4	Ochoa-Anderson (USA)	142
3	Ellison (SLO)	149
6	Vennam (IND)	148
7	Kirar (IND)	143
2	López (COL)	148

Semi-finals; 9 July
9	Gibson (GBR)	146^{9+}
5	Pearce (USA)	146^{9}
3	Ellison (SLO)	143
2	López (COL)	148

Finals; 9 July
9	Gibson (GBR)	148
2	López (COL)	142
Third place 9 July
5	Pearce (USA)	148
3	Ellison (SLO)	145
