= Archery at the 2022 World Games – Men's individual recurve =

Men's individual recurve at the 2022 World Games
- Venue: Avondale Park Historic District, Birmingham, United States
- Dates: 10–12 July
- Competitors: 12 from 11 nations

Medalists
| gold medal | Florian Unruh | Germany |
| silver medal | Brady Ellison | United States |
| bronze medal | Marco Morello | Italy |

The men's individual recurve archery competition at the 2022 World Games took place from 10 to 12 July 2022 at the Avondale Park Historic District in Birmingham, United States.

== Results ==
=== Ranking round ===
| Rank | Archer | Nation | Score | 6s | 5s |
|---|---|---|---|---|---|
| 1 | Brady Ellison | United States | 388 | 38 | 24 |
| 2 | Florian Unruh | Germany | 379 | 37 | 21 |
| 3 | Patrick Huston | Great Britain | 371 | 28 | 28 |
| 4 | Marco Morello | Italy | 363 | 24 | 30 |
| 5 | Alen Remar | Croatia | 360 | 24 | 27 |
| 6 | Matthew Nofel | United States | 358 | 25 | 26 |
| 7 | Jonathan Andersson | Sweden | 357 | 29 | 21 |
| 8 | Wataru Oonuki | Japan | 353 | 24 | 28 |
| 9 | Den Habjan Malavašič | Slovenia | 351 | 17 | 33 |
| 10 | Sam Herlicq | France | 343 | 17 | 27 |
| 11 | Tadeáš Kalvas | Czech Republic | 337 | 15 | 26 |
| 12 | Carlos Iglesias | Spain | 307 | 13 | 17 |

=== Elimination round ===
Pool A

Match 1
Sam Herlicq (FRA) | 84
Tadeáš Kalvas (CZE) | 86

Match 2
Jonathan Andersson (SWE) | 96
Tadeáš Kalvas (CZE) | 86

Match 3
Matthew Nofel (USA) | 79
Jonathan Andersson (SWE) | 85

Match 4
Patrick Huston (GBR) | 97
Jonathan Andersson (SWE) | 91

Pool B

Match 1
Carlos Iglesias (ESP) | 76
Den Habjan Malavašič (SLO) | 89

Match 2
Den Habjan Malavašič (SLO) | 92
Wataru Oonuki (JPN) | 93

Match 3
Wataru Oonuki (JPN) | 80^{4}
Alen Remar (CRO) | 80^{5}

Match 4
Alen Remar (CRO) | 81
Marco Morello (ITA) | 87

=== Finals ===
Semi-finals
Brady Ellison (USA) | 64
Patrick Huston (GBR) | 55
Marco Morello (ITA) | 58
Florian Unruh (GER) | 64

Gold medal match
Brady Ellison (USA) | 61
Florian Unruh (GER) | 66
Bronze medal match
Patrick Huston (GBR) | 52
Marco Morello (ITA) | 61
