= Water skiing at the 2022 World Games – Men's jump =

Water skiing - Men's jump at the 2022 World Games
- Venue: Oak Mountain State Park, Birmingham, United States
- Dates: 15–16 July 2022
- Competitors: 10 from 10 nations

Medalists
gold medal	Danylo Filchenko	Ukraine
silver medal	Taylor Garcia	United States
bronze medal	Tobías Giorgis	Argentina

The men's jump competition in water skiing at the 2022 World Games took place from 15 to 16 July 2022 at the Oak Mountain State Park in Birmingham, United States.

== Competition format ==
A total of 10 athletes entered the competition. From preliminary round the best 5 skiers qualify to final.

== Results ==
=== Preliminary round ===
Rank	Athlete	Nation	Result	Note
1	Taylor Garcia	United States	62.7	Q
2	Danylo Filchenko	Ukraine	61.4	Q
3	Emile Ritter	Chile	60.8	Q
4	Tobías Giorgis	Argentina	60.6	Q
5	Edoardo Marenzi	Italy	57.5	Q
6	Claudio Köstenberger	Austria	56.9	
7	Jeong Ji-min	South Korea	53.6	
8	Alvaro Noguera	Spain	51.9	
9	Luke Outram	Great Britain	47.6	
	Martin Kolman	Czech Republic	DNS	

=== Final ===
Rank	Athlete	Nation	Result
1st place, gold medalist(s)	Danylo Filchenko	Ukraine	64.9
2nd place, silver medalist(s)	Taylor Garcia	United States	63.9
3rd place, bronze medalist(s)	Tobías Giorgis	Argentina	62.1
4	Emile Ritter	Chile	60.4
5	Edoardo Marenzi	Italy	59.9
