= Archery at the 2022 World Games – Women's individual barebow =

Women's individual barebow at the 2022 World Games
- Venue: Avondale Park Historic District, Birmingham, United States
- Dates: 13–15 July
- Competitors: 12 from 11 nations

Medalists
gold medal	Cinzia Noziglia	Italy
silver medal	Christina Lyons	United States
bronze medal	Lina Björklund	Sweden

The women's individual barebow archery competition at the 2022 World Games took place from 13 to 15 July 2022 at the Avondale Park Historic District in Birmingham, United States.

== Results ==
=== Ranking round ===
Rank	Archer	Nation	Score	6s	5s
1	Cinzia Noziglia	Italy	312	14	19
2	Anne Viljanen	Finland	291	9	24
3	Tina Gutman	Slovenia	288	7	17
4	Christina Lyons	United States	284	14	11
5	Christine Gauthe	France	282	9	9
6	Ana Cano	Spain	282	8	17
7	Lina Björklund	Sweden	280	6	20
8	Stine Åséll	Sweden	279	12	10
9	Martina Boscher	Germany	270	10	14
10	Orla O'Connor	Ireland	260	6	12
11	Andrea Payer	Austria	255	6	11
12	Victoria Williams	Great Britain	242	4	12

=== Elimination round ===
Pool A

Match 1
Orla O'Connor (IRL)	68
Andrea Payer (AUT)	76

Match 2
Lina Björklund (SWE)	84
Andrea Payer (AUT)	72

Match 3
Ana Cano (ESP)	58
Lina Björklund (SWE)	82

Match 4
Tina Gutman (SLO)	70
Lina Björklund (SWE)	76

Pool B

Match 1
Victoria Williams (GBR)	51
Martina Boscher (GER)	72

Match 2
Martina Boscher (GER)	67^{1}
Stine Åséll (SWE)	67^{M}

Match 3
Martina Boscher (GER)	70
Christine Gauthe (FRA)	67

Match 4
Martina Boscher (GER)	65
Christina Lyons (USA)	83

=== Finals ===
Semi-finals
Cinzia Noziglia (ITA)	51
Lina Björklund (SWE)	50
Christina Lyons (USA)	43
Anne Viljanen (FIN)	36

Gold medal match
Cinzia Noziglia (ITA)	48
Christina Lyons (USA)	44
Bronze medal match
Lina Björklund (SWE)	53
Anne Viljanen (FIN)	32
