= Archery at the 2022 World Games – Men's individual barebow =

Men's individual barebow at the 2022 World Games
- Venue: Avondale Park Historic District, Birmingham, United States
- Dates: 13–15 July
- Competitors: 12 from 11 nations

Medalists
gold medal	Erik Jonsson	Sweden
silver medal	Leo Pettersson	Sweden
bronze medal	Ryan Davis	United States

The men's individual barebow archery competition at the 2022 World Games took place from 13 to 15 July 2022 at the Avondale Park Historic District in Birmingham, United States.

== Results ==
=== Ranking round ===
Rank	Archer	Nation	Score	6s	5s
1	Erik Jonsson	Sweden	340	19	24
2	Leo Pettersson	Sweden	335	16	27
3	David García	Spain	334	16	22
4	Michael Meyer	Germany	333	19	18
5	Giuseppe Seimandi	Italy	328	15	24
6	David Jackson	France	324	15	18
7	József Molnár	Hungary	320	13	22
8	James Annall	Great Britain	315	11	22
9	Alois Steinwender	Austria	312	8	21
10	Ryan Davis	United States	305	10	18
11	Iztok Spinelli	Slovenia	303	11	18
12	Lars Sørlie	Norway	290	8	17

=== Elimination round ===
Pool A

Match 1
Ryan Davis (USA)	80
Iztok Spinelli (SLO)	70

Match 2
József Molnár (HUN)	76
Ryan Davis (USA)	85

Match 3
David Jackson (FRA)	74
Ryan Davis (USA)	80

Match 4
David García (ESP)	80
Ryan Davis (USA)	83

Pool B

Match 1
Lars Sørlie (NOR)	74
Alois Steinwender (AUT)	76

Match 2
Alois Steinwender (AUT)	82
James Annall (GBR)	71

Match 3
Alois Steinwender (AUT)	78
Giuseppe Seimandi (ITA)	82

Match 4
Giuseppe Seimandi (ITA)	81
Michael Meyer (GER)	84

=== Finals ===
Semifinals
Leo Pettersson (SWE)	50
Ryan Davis (USA)	49
Michael Meyer (GER)	47^{4}
Erik Jonsson (SWE)	47^{4+}

Gold medal match
Leo Pettersson (SWE)	52
Erik Jonsson (SWE)	57
Bronze medal match
Ryan Davis (USA)	52
Michael Meyer (GER)	51
