= Squash at the 2022 World Games =

International squash competition to be held in USA

- Venue: University of Alabama Birmingham; Birmingham, United States
- Dates: 13–17 July 2022
- No. of events: 2

The squash competition at the 2022 World Games took place in July 2022, in Birmingham in United States, at the University of Alabama Birmingham. Originally scheduled to take place in July 2021, the Games were rescheduled for July 2022 as a result of the 2020 Summer Olympics postponement due to the COVID-19 pandemic.

== Schedule ==
All times are Alabama Time (UTC-5)

| P | Preliminaries | ¼ | Quarterfinals | ½ | Semifinals | B | Bronze medal match | F | Final |

| Date → | Wed 13 | | | Thu 14 | | | Fri 15 | | | Sat 16 | | Sun 17 | |
| Event ↓ | M | A | E | M | A | E | M | A | E | A | E | M | A |
|---|---|---|---|---|---|---|---|---|---|---|---|---|---|
| Men's singles | P | | | | | | ¼ | | | ½ | | B | F |
| Women's singles | P | | | | | | ¼ | | | ½ | | B | F |

M = Morning session, A = Afternoon session, E = Evening session

== Medal table ==
* Host nation (United States)

| Rank | Nation | Gold | Silver | Bronze | Total |
|---|---|---|---|---|---|
| 1 | France | 1 | 1 | 1 | 3 |
| 2 | Belgium | 1 | 0 | 0 | 1 |
| 3 | Great Britain | 0 | 1 | 0 | 1 |
| 4 | Colombia | 0 | 0 | 1 | 1 |
| Totals (4 entries) | | 2 | 2 | 2 | 6 |

== Events ==
| Event | Gold | Silver | Bronze |
|---|---|---|---|
| Men's singles | Victor Crouin; France | Grégoire Marche; France | Miguel Ángel Rodríguez; Colombia |
| Women's singles | Tinne Gilis; Belgium | Lucy Beecroft; Great Britain | Coline Aumard; France |
