= Sport climbing at the 2022 World Games – Women's lead =

Women's lead at the 2022 World Games
- Venue: Sloss Furnaces, Birmingham, United States
- Dates: 16 July
- Competitors: 12 from 10 nations

Medalists
gold medal	Jessica Pilz	Austria
silver medal	Natsuki Tanii	Japan
bronze medal	Lana Skušek	Slovenia

The women's lead competition in sport climbing at the 2022 World Games took place on 16 July 2022 at the Sloss Furnaces in Birmingham, United States.

== Results ==
Rank	Athlete	Qualification		Final	
Rank	Athlete	HR	Rank	HR	Rank
1st place, gold medalist(s)	Jessica Pilz (AUT)	35+	2	42+	1
2nd place, silver medalist(s)	Natsuki Tanii (JPN)	Top	1	35	2
3rd place, bronze medalist(s)	Lana Skušek (SLO)	31+	6	34+	3
4	Ignacia Mellado (CHI)	31+	6	33	4
5	Ievgeniia Kazbekova (UKR)	32+	3	32+	5
5	Salomé Romain (FRA)	32+	3	32+	5
7	Momoko Abe (JPN)	32+	3	31+	7
8	Chloé Caulier (BEL)	28+	8	29	8
9	Ayala Kerem (ISR)	27+	9	Did not advance	
10	Cloe Coscoy (USA)	26+	10	Did not advance	
11	Lucija Tarkuš (SLO)	15	11	Did not advance	
12	Lauren Mukheibir (RSA)	14	12	Did not advance	
