= Tug of war at the 2022 World Games =

- Venue: University of Alabama Birmingham
- Dates: 14–16 July 2022
- No. of events: 3

The tug of war competition at the 2022 World Games took place in July 2022, in Birmingham in United States, at the University of Alabama Birmingham. Originally scheduled to take place in July 2021, the Games were rescheduled for July 2022 as a result of the 2020 Summer Olympics postponement due to the COVID-19 pandemic. This was the first time when mixed event in tug of war took place as part of the World Games.

== Participating nations ==
- Belgium
- Chinese Taipei
- Germany
- Great Britain
- Italy
- Netherlands
- Switzerland
- Sweden

== Medal table ==
* Host nation (United States)

Rank	Nation	Gold	Silver	Bronze	Total
1	Great Britain	1	1	0	2
2	Switzerland	1	0	1	2
3	Chinese Taipei	1	0	0	1
4	Germany	0	1	0	1
4	Sweden	0	1	0	1
6	Belgium	0	0	1	1
6	Netherlands	0	0	1	1
Totals (7 entries)		3	3	3	9

== Medalists ==
Event	Gold	Silver	Bronze
Men's outdoor 640 kg	Switzerland; Martin Arnold; Thomas Arnold; Walter Bernhard; Robin Burch; Ueli Christen; Samuel Grani; Ruedi Odermatt; Fabian Rolli; Emanuel Zumbuhl; Johannes Zumbuhl	Great Britain; Marshall Drew; Daniel Paul Kenny; Will Lee; Ian Murphy; Tony Peck; Andy Rebori; Ian Robinson; Leeboy Robinson; Peter Darren Sellars; Aidan Wheeler	Belgium; Wim Broeckx; Jan Hendrickx; Joeri Janssens; Luc Mertens; Raf Mertens; Wouter Raeymaekers; Johny Schuermans; Wim de Schutter; Ief Smets; Dries Vermeiren; Joris Vermeiren
Women's outdoor 540 kg	Chinese Taipei; Gu Tsai-rong; Huang Yu-an; Lai Ting-yu; Li Ju-chun; Lin Meng-zhu; Shih Chih-hsin; Tien Chia-hsin; Tien Chia-jung; Tung Han	Sweden; Justin Andersson; Knif Eriksson; Knif Frida Hed; Karin Jacobson; Ellen Lilja; Stor Lindquist Olsson; Magdalena Persson; Sofia Persson; Hanna Maria Westerling	Switzerland; Stephanie Arnet; Elena Beier; Petra Kaslin; Michaela Koch; Stefanie Rita Ott; Jasmin Villiger; Melanie Villiger; Sarah Villiger; Brigitte Regula Ziegler; Erika Sara Zumbuhl
Mixed outdoor 580 kg	Great Britain; Tara Adams; Lucie Gray; Richard John Keightley; Daniel Paul Kenny; Will Lee; Ian Robinson; Leeboy Robinson; Emma Stone; Aidan Wheeler; Charlotte Wiliams	Germany; Fabien Elias; Julia Agnes Frieß; Lukas Maier; Lorenz Alexander Mühl; Ramona Susanne Mühl; Nicole Pflüger; Florian Resch; Rainer Vogel; Thomas Wegmann	Netherlands; Robert Bentsink; Ruud Geerdes; Gerben Jansen; Jan Willem Klumpers; Jolanda Klumpers-Floors; Annieta Nieuwland; Nanda Martrude Oude Egberink; Arjan Martijn Oude Nijhuis; Aloysius Maria Ribberink; Trude Zonneveld
