= Archery at the 2022 World Games =

- The pictogram of Archery.
- Venue: Avondale Park Historic District
- Dates: 8–15 July
- Competitors: 97 from 35 nations

The archery competition at the 2022 World Games took place in July 2022, in Birmingham in United States, at the Avondale Park Historic District. Originally scheduled to take place in July 2021, the Games were rescheduled for July 2022 as a result of the 2020 Summer Olympics postponement due to the COVID-19 pandemic. It served as a qualifying event for the 2024 Summer Olympics in Paris, France.

== Participating nations ==
- Australia (1)
- Austria (3)
- Belgium (1)
- Canada (1)
- Chile (1)
- Colombia (2)
- Croatia (2)
- Czech Republic (2)
- Denmark (2)
- El Salvador (2)
- Estonia (1)
- Finland (1)
- France (6)
- Germany (6)
- Great Britain (5)
- Hungary (1)
- India (4)
- Ireland (1)
- Italy (4)
- Japan (1)
- Kazakhstan (1)
- Mexico (2)
- Netherlands (4)
- New Zealand (3)
- Norway (1)
- Poland (1)
- Puerto Rico (1)
- Slovakia (2)
- Slovenia (5)
- South Africa (4)
- South Korea (4)
- Spain (4)
- Sweden (6)
- Switzerland (1)
- United States (11)

== Medal table ==
* Host nation (United States)

| Rank | Nation | Gold | Silver | Bronze | Total |
|---|---|---|---|---|---|
| 1 | Italy | 2 | 0 | 1 | 3 |
| 2 | Sweden | 1 | 1 | 1 | 3 |
| 3 | Colombia | 1 | 1 | 0 | 2 |
| 3 | Great Britain | 1 | 1 | 0 | 2 |
| 5 | Germany | 1 | 0 | 1 | 2 |
| 6 | Mexico | 1 | 0 | 0 | 1 |
| 7 | United States* | 0 | 2 | 2 | 4 |
| 8 | France | 0 | 1 | 0 | 1 |
| 8 | Netherlands | 0 | 1 | 0 | 1 |
| 10 | Canada | 0 | 0 | 1 | 1 |
| 10 | India | 0 | 0 | 1 | 1 |
| Totals (11 entries) | | 7 | 7 | 7 | 21 |

== Medalists ==
=== Men ===
| Event | Gold | Silver | Bronze |
|---|---|---|---|
| Compound | Miguel Becerra; Mexico | Jean-Philippe Boulch; France | Christopher Perkins; Canada |
| Barebow | Erik Jonsson; Sweden | Leo Pettersson; Sweden | Ryan Davis; United States |
| Recurve | Florian Unruh; Germany | Brady Ellison; United States | Marco Morello; Italy |

=== Women ===
| Event | Gold | Silver | Bronze |
|---|---|---|---|
| Compound | Ella Gibson; Great Britain | Sara López; Colombia | Paige Pearce; United States |
| Barebow | Cinzia Noziglia; Italy | Christina Lyons; United States | Lina Björklund; Sweden |
| Recurve | Chiara Rebagliati; Italy | Bryony Pitman; Great Britain | Elisa Tartler; Germany |

=== Mixed ===
| Event | Gold | Silver | Bronze |
|---|---|---|---|
| Compound team | Colombia; Sara López; Daniel Muñoz | Netherlands; Jody Beckers; Mike Schloesser | India; Jyothi Surekha Vennam; Abhishek Verma |
