= Great Britain at the 2022 World Games =

- IOC code: GBR
- NOC: British Olympic Committee

in Birmingham, United States 7 July 2022 – 17 July 2022
- Competitors: 110 (58 men and 52 women) in 17 sports
- Medals Ranked 13th: Gold 6 Silver 3 Bronze 4 Total 13

World Games appearances
- 1981; 1985; 1989; 1993; 1997; 2001; 2005; 2009; 2013; 2017; 2022; 2025

Great Britain competed at the 2022 World Games held in Birmingham, United States from 7 to 17 July 2022. Athletes representing Great Britain won six gold medals, three silver medals and four bronze medals. The country finished in 13th place in the medal table.

== Medalists ==
Medal	Name	Sport	Event	Date
Gold	Ella Gibson	Archery	Women's individual compound	9 July
Gold	Mixed team	Tug of war	Mixed outdoor 580 kg	16 July
Gold	Kelly Fisher	Cue sports	Women's nine-ball pool	16 July
Gold	Iman Barlow	Muaythai	Women's 57 kg	17 July
Gold	Bradley Gold; Archie Goonesekera; Finlay Gray; Andrew Morris-Hunt	Acrobatic gymnastics	Men's group	17 July
Silver	Bryony Pitman	Archery	Women's individual recurve	12 July
Silver	Men's team	Tug of war	Men's outdoor 640 kg	14 July
Silver	Lucy Beecroft	Squash	Women's singles	17 July
Bronze	Tony Cliffe	Powerlifting	Men's super heavyweight	10 July
Bronze	David Nelmes	Parkour	Men's speedrun	11 July
Bronze	Mixed team	Orienteering	Mixed sprint relay	17 July
Bronze	Darren Morgan	Cue sports	Men's snooker	16 July

=== Invitational sports ===
Medal	Name	Sport	Event	Date
Gold	Mixed team	Wheelchair rugby	Mixed tournament	17 July

== Competitors ==
The following is the list of number of competitors in the Games.

Sport	Men	Women	Total
Acrobatic gymnastics	6	0	6
Archery	2	3	5
Canoe marathon	1	1	2
Canoe polo	0	8	8
Cue sports	2	1	3
Flying disc	8	7	15
Lacrosse	12	12	24
Muaythai	0	2	2
Orienteering	2	2	4
Parkour	1	0	1
Powerlifting	1	2	3
Squash	0	1	1
Trampoline gymnastics	2	2	4
Tug of war	11	10	21
Water skiing	3	0	3
Wheelchair rugby	6	1	7
Wushu	1	0	1
Total	58	52	110

== Acrobatic gymnastics ==
Great Britain won one gold medal in acrobatic gymnastics.

== Archery ==
Great Britain won two medals in archery.

Recurve / barebow

Athlete	Event	Qualification		Elimination 1	Elimination 2	Elimination 3	Elimination 4	Semifinal	Final / BM	
Athlete	Event	Score	Rank	Opposition Result	Opposition Result	Opposition Result	Opposition Result	Opposition Result	Opposition Result	Rank
Patrick Huston	Men's recurve									
James Annall	Men's barebow									
Bryony Pitman	Women's recurve	353	2	Bye				(Slovenia) Čavič; W 56–53	(Italy) Rebagliati; L 53–64	2nd place, silver medalist(s)
Victoria Williams	Women's barebow	242	12	(Germany) Boscher; L 51–72	did not advance					

Compound

Athlete	Event	Ranking round		Round of 32	Round of 16	Quarterfinals	Semifinals	Final / BM	
Athlete	Event	Score	Seed	Opposition Result	Opposition Result	Opposition Result	Opposition Result	Opposition Result	Rank
Ella Gibson	Women's compound	699	9	(United States) Gardner; W 146–131	(New Zealand) Randle; W 148–143	(Denmark) Gellenthien; W 150–147	(United States) Pearce; W 146*–146	(Colombia) López; W 148–142	1st place, gold medalist(s)

== Canoe marathon ==
Great Britain competed in canoe marathon.

== Canoe polo ==
Great Britain competed in canoe polo.

== Cue sports ==
Great Britain won two medals in cue sports.

== Flying disc ==
Great Britain competed in the flying disc competition.

== Lacrosse ==
Great Britain competed in lacrosse.

== Muaythai ==
Great Britain won one gold medal in muaythai.

== Orienteering ==
Great Britain won one bronze medal in orienteering.

== Parkour ==
Great Britain won one bronze medal in parkour.

== Powerlifting ==
Great Britain won one bronze medal in powerlifting.

Men

Athlete	Event	Exercises			Total weight	Total points	Rank
Athlete	Event	Squat	Bench press	Deadlift	Total weight	Total points	Rank
Tony Cliffe	Men's super heavyweight	420.0	322.5	370.0	1112.5	105.33	3rd place, bronze medalist(s)

Women

Athlete	Event	Exercises			Total weight	Total points	Rank
Athlete	Event	Squat	Bench press	Deadlift	Total weight	Total points	Rank
Emma Goodwin	Women's lightweight	177.5	80.0	—	—	—	DSQ
Ellie Steel	Women's middleweight	200.0	145.0	172.5	517.5	98.28	7

== Squash ==
Great Britain won one silver medal in squash.

== Trampoline gymnastics ==
Great Britain competed in trampoline gymnastics.

== Tug of war ==
Great Britain won two medals in tug of war.

== Water skiing ==
Great Britain competed in water skiing.

== Wheelchair rugby ==
Great Britain won the gold medal in the wheelchair rugby tournament.

== Wushu ==
Great Britain competed in wushu.
