= Canoe marathon at the 2022 World Games =

- Venue: Oak Mountain State Park
- Dates: 11–12 July
- No. of events: 4
- Competitors: 40 from 22 nations

The canoe marathon competition at the 2022 World Games took place in July 2022, in Birmingham in United States, at the Oak Mountain State Park. Originally scheduled to take place in July 2021, the Games have been rescheduled for July 2022 as a result of the 2020 Summer Olympics postponement due to the COVID-19 pandemic. This was the first time, when canoe marathon was an official discipline in The World Games programme (in 2013 it was an invitational event).

== Participating nations ==
- Argentina (2)
- Belgium (1)
- Czech Republic (2)
- Chile (1)
- Denmark (2)
- France (2)
- Germany (2)
- Great Britain (2)
- Hungary (3)
- Ireland (1)
- Italy (2)
- Japan (2)
- Netherlands (1)
- Norway (2)
- Poland (2)
- Portugal (2)
- Slovakia (1)
- South Africa (2)
- Spain (2)
- Sweden (2)
- Ukraine (2)
- United States (2)

== Medal table ==
Rank	Nation	Gold	Silver	Bronze	Total
1	Hungary	2	0	1	3
2	Denmark	1	2	0	3
3	South Africa	1	0	0	1
4	Spain	0	1	2	3
5	Germany	0	1	0	1
6	Portugal	0	0	1	1
Totals (6 entries)		4	4	4	12

== Medalists ==
=== Men ===
Event	Gold		Silver		Bronze	
Short distance	Mads Pedersen; Denmark	13:50.92	Nico Paufler; Germany	14:01.41	José Ramalho; Portugal	14:04.06
Standard distance	Andy Birkett; South Africa	1:23:52.83	Mads Pedersen; Denmark	1:23:53.13	Iván Alonso; Spain	1:25:14.82

=== Women ===
Event	Gold		Silver		Bronze	
Short distance	Vanda Kiszli; Hungary	15:22.46	Eva Barrios; Spain	15:34.49	Zsóka Csikós; Hungary	15:34.68
Standard distance	Vanda Kiszli; Hungary	1:32:40.76	Cathrine Rask; Denmark	1:32:56.66	Eva Barrios; Spain	1:34:16.65
