= Water skiing at the 2022 World Games – Women's slalom =

Water skiing - Women's slalom at the 2022 World Games
- Venue: Oak Mountain State Park, Birmingham, United States
- Dates: 14–15 July 2022
- Competitors: 6 from 6 nations

Medalists
gold medal	Regina Jaquess	United States
silver medal	Jaimee Bull	Canada
bronze medal	Geena Krueger	Germany

The women's slalom competition in water skiing at the 2022 World Games took place from 14 to 15 July 2022 at the Oak Mountain State Park in Birmingham, United States.

== Competition format ==
A total of 6 athletes entered the competition. From preliminary round the best 5 skiers qualify to final.

== Results ==
=== Preliminary round ===
Rank	Athlete	Nation	Result	Note
1	Regina Jaquess	United States	1.00/55/10.75	Q
2	Jaimee Bull	Canada	4.00/55/11.25	Q
3	Luisa Jaramillo	Colombia	5.00/55/12.00	Q
3	Geena Krueger	Germany	5.00/55/12.00	Q
5	Alice Bagnoli	Italy	4.00/55/12.00	Q
6	Natascha Rottcher	Namibia	4.00/55/14.25	

=== Final ===
Rank	Athlete	Nation	Result
1st place, gold medalist(s)	Regina Jaquess	United States	6.00/55/11.25
2nd place, silver medalist(s)	Jaimee Bull	Canada	3.00/55/11.25
3rd place, bronze medalist(s)	Geena Krueger	Germany	2.00/55/11.25
4	Luisa Jaramillo	Colombia	1.00/55/11.25
5	Alice Bagnoli	Italy	3.50/55/13.00
