= Parkour at the 2022 World Games =

- Venue: Sloss Furnaces
- Dates: 10–11 July 2022
- No. of events: 4

The parkour competition at the 2022 World Games took place in July 2022, in Birmingham in United States, at the Sloss Furnaces. Originally scheduled to take place in July 2021, the Games were rescheduled for July 2022 as a result of the 2020 Summer Olympics postponement due to the COVID-19 pandemic. Parkour competition made its debut as official sport of The World Games programme.

== Participating nations ==
- Australia (1)
- Belgium (1)
- Bulgaria (1)
- Czech Republic (2)
- Spain (1)
- Great Britain (1)
- Greece (1)
- Italy (1)
- Japan (2)
- Netherlands (1)
- Sweden (2)
- Ukraine (2)
- United States (1)

== Medal table ==
* Host nation (United States)

Rank	Nation	Gold	Silver	Bronze	Total
1	Sweden	1	2	0	3
2	Netherlands	1	1	0	2
3	Greece	1	0	0	1
3	Ukraine	1	0	0	1
5	Italy	0	1	0	1
6	Japan	0	0	2	2
7	Belgium	0	0	1	1
7	Great Britain	0	0	1	1
Totals (8 entries)		4	4	4	12

== Events ==
=== Men ===
Event	Gold	Silver	Bronze
Speedrun	Bohdan Kolmakov; Ukraine	Andrea Consolini; Italy	David Nelmes; Great Britain
Freestyle	Ioakeim Theodoridis; Greece	Elis Torhall; Sweden	Jérémy Lorsignol; Belgium

=== Women ===
Event	Gold	Silver	Bronze
Speedrun	Miranda Tibbling; Sweden	Noa Man; Netherlands	Hikari Izumi; Japan
Freestyle	Noa Man; Netherlands	Miranda Tibbling; Sweden	Hikari Izumi; Japan
