= Austria at the 2022 World Games =

- IOC code: AUT
- NOC: Austrian Olympic Committee

in Birmingham, United States 7 July 2022 – 17 July 2022
- Competitors: 72 (36 men and 36 women) in 16 sports
- Medals Ranked 30th: Gold 2 Silver 1 Bronze 1 Total 4

World Games appearances
- 1981; 1985; 1989; 1993; 1997; 2001; 2005; 2009; 2013; 2017; 2022; 2025

Austria competed at the 2022 World Games held in Birmingham, United States from 7 to 17 July 2022. Athletes representing Austria won two gold medals, one silver medal and one bronze medal. The country finished in 30th place in the medal table.

== Medalists ==
Medal	Name	Sport	Event	Date
Gold	Stella Hemetsberger	Kickboxing	Women's 60 kg	14 July
Gold	Jessica Pilz	Sport climbing	Women's lead	16 July
Silver	Alisa Buchinger	Karate	Women's kumite 68 kg	9 July
Bronze	Anna Sturm; Matthias Feichtinger	Dancesport	Rock 'n' Roll	9 July

== Competitors ==
The following is the list of number of competitors in the Games.

Sport	Men	Women	Total
Archery	2	1	3
Cue sports	2	0	2
Dancesport	1	1	2
Duathlon	0	1	1
Fistball	10	10	20
Flag football	12	12	24
Ju-jitsu	0	2	2
Karate	0	1	1
Kickboxing	0	1	1
Muaythai	0	2	2
Orienteering	2	2	4
Powerlifting	1	1	2
Road speed skating Track speed skating	1	0	1
Sport climbing	4	2	6
Water skiing	1	0	1
Total	36	36	72

== Archery ==
Austria competed in archery.

Barebow

Athlete	Event	Qualification		Elimination 1	Elimination 2	Elimination 3	Elimination 4	Semifinal	Final / BM	
Athlete	Event	Score	Rank	Opposition Result	Opposition Result	Opposition Result	Opposition Result	Opposition Result	Opposition Result	Rank
Alois Steinwender	Men's barebow									
Andrea Payer	Women's barebow									

Compound

Athlete	Event	Ranking round		Round of 32	Round of 16	Quarterfinals	Semifinals	Final / BM	
Athlete	Event	Score	Seed	Opposition Result	Opposition Result	Opposition Result	Opposition Result	Opposition Result	Rank
Nico Wiener	Men's compound	707	7	Bye	(Poland) Łukasz Przybylski; L 146–150	did not advance			

== Cue sports ==
Austria competed in cue sports.

== Dancesport ==
Austria won one bronze medal in dancesport.

== Duathlon ==
Austria competed in duathlon.

== Fistball ==
Austria competed in fistball.

== Flag football ==
Austria competed in flag football.

== Ju-jitsu ==
Austria competed in ju-jitsu.

== Karate ==
Austria won one silver medal in karate.

Women

Athlete	Event	Elimination round				Semifinal	Final / BM	
Athlete	Event	Opposition Result	Opposition Result	Opposition Result	Rank	Opposition Result	Opposition Result	Rank
Alisa Buchinger	Women's kumite 68 kg	Semeraro (ITA); L 2–4	Lingl (USA); W 2–0	Bratic (CAN); W 2–0	2 Q	Agier (FRA); W 1–0	Semeraro (ITA); L 1–4	2nd place, silver medalist(s)

== Kickboxing ==
Austria won one gold medal in kickboxing.

Athlete	Category	Quarterfinals	Semifinals	Final/Bronze medal bout	
Athlete	Category	Opposition Result	Opposition Result	Opposition Result	Rank
Stella Hemetsberger	Women's 60 kg	Pöyhönen (FIN); W 3–0	Martyniuk (UKR); W 2–1	Bjelogrlić (SRB); W 3–0	1st place, gold medalist(s)

== Muaythai ==
Austria competed in muaythai.

== Orienteering ==
Austria competed in orienteering.

== Powerlifting ==
Austria competed in powerlifting.

Men

Athlete	Event	Exercises			Total weight	Total points	Rank
Athlete	Event	Squat	Bench press	Deadlift	Total weight	Total points	Rank
Alexander Huber	Men's middleweight	310.0	227.5	290.0	827.5	95.66	9

Women

Athlete	Event	Exercises			Total weight	Total points	Rank
Athlete	Event	Squat	Bench press	Deadlift	Total weight	Total points	Rank
Ines Kahrer	Women's heavyweight	227.5	130.0	180.0	537.5	92.92	10

== Road speed skating ==
Austria competed in road speed skating.

== Sport climbing ==
Austria won one gold medal in sport climbing.

== Track speed skating ==
Austria competed in track speed skating.

== Water skiing ==
Austria competed in water skiing.
