= Floorball at the 2022 World Games =

- Venue: BJCC East Exhibition Hall, Birmingham, United States
- Dates: 8–12 July 2022
- No. of events: 1
- Competitors: from 8 nations

Medalists
1st place, gold medalist(s)		Sweden
2nd place, silver medalist(s)		Finland
3rd place, bronze medalist(s)		Czech Republic

Floorball at the 2022 World Games
Tournament statistics
- Games played: 18
- Goals scored: 219 (12.17 per game)
- Attendance: 5,687 (316 per game)
- Scoring leader: (Finland) Eemeli Salin (15 points)

The floorball competition at the 2022 World Games took place in July 2022, in Birmingham, United States, at the BJCC East Exhibition Hall. Originally scheduled to take place in July 2021, the Games were rescheduled for July 2022 as a result of the 2020 Summer Olympics postponement due to the COVID-19 pandemic.

As in the previous edition, matches were played in a tested format of three 15-minute periods (instead of the usual 20 minutes) with rosters limited to 14 players. Once again, only a men's tournament was held. Eight teams competed, two more than in the previous Games.

The Swedish national team successfully defended their title from both the previous World Games and the most recent World Championship. Czechia defeated Latvia in the bronze medal match to win their first medal at the Games. This marked the first time Latvia competed for a medal at a major international tournament.

== Qualification ==
Qualification for the floorball event of the 2022 World Games was determined through the 2020 Men's World Floorball Championships. The United States as host qualified automatically. The top five finishing teams at the 2020 World Championships as well as the best finishing team from the Americas and Asia Oceania qualified for the World Games. However the qualified Asia-Oceania team had to be confirmed by the IFF Central Board and General Assembly since qualification for Asia Oceania teams for the World Championship was not held.

=== Qualified teams ===
Team	Method of qualification
United States	Hosts
Sweden	2020 World Championships winners
Finland	2020 World Championships runners-up
Czech Republic	2020 World Championships third-placed team
Switzerland	2020 World Championships fourth-placed team
Latvia	2020 World Championships fifth-placed team
Canada	2020 World Championships best finishing team from the Americas
Thailand	2020 World Championships best finishing team from Asia-Oceania

== Medal table ==
Rank	Nation	Gold	Silver	Bronze	Total
1	Sweden	1	0	0	1
2	Finland	0	1	0	1
3	Czech Republic	0	0	1	1
Totals (3 entries)		1	1	1	3

== Medallists ==
Event	Gold	Silver	Bronze
Men's tournament	Sweden; Hampus Ahrén; Rasmus Enström; Tobias Gustafsson; Kevin Haglund; Jon Hedlund; Linus Holmgren; Emil Johansson; Malte Lundmark; Måns Parsjö-Tegnér; Ludwig Persson; Niklas Ramirez; Johan Samuelsson; Jesper Sankell; Albin Sjögren	Finland; Eemeli Akola; Oskari Fälden; Sami Johansson; Justus Kainulainen; Ville Lastikka; Otto Lehkosuo; Mikko Leikkanen; Joonas Pylsy; Joona Rantala; Eemeli Salin; Nico Salo; Eetu Sikkinen; Lassi Toriseva; Konsta Tykkyläinen	Czech Republic; Lukáš Bauer; Dominik Beneš; Martin Beneš; Jiří Besta; Adam Delong; Filip Forman; Matěj Havlas; Adam Hemerka; Mikuláš Krbec; Filip Langer; Ondřej Němeček; Lukáš Punčochář; Josef Rýpar; Matyáš Šindler

== Tournament format ==
Eight teams were divided into two groups. In the group stage each team played each other once from 8 to 10 July 2022.

The top two teams from each group advanced to a two-round play-off, which took place on 11 and 12 July. The remaining teams played in placement matches.

== Results ==
=== Preliminary round ===
All times are local (UTC–5).

==== Group A ====
Pos	Team	Pld	W	D	L	GF	GA	GD	Pts	Qualification
1	Sweden	3	2	1	0	29	7	+22	5	Semifinals
2	Latvia	3	2	1	0	27	13	+14	5	Semifinals
3	Switzerland	3	1	0	2	15	12	+3	2	Fifth place game
4	Thailand	3	0	0	3	6	45	−39	0	Seventh place game

Source: IFF

8 July 2022; 09:30	Sweden	6–6 (2–1, 2–4, 2–1)	Latvia	BJCC East Exhibition Hall, Birmingham; Attendance: 456

IFF

8 July 2022; 15:30	Switzerland	10–3 (4–0, 2–2, 4–1)	Thailand	BJCC East Exhibition Hall, Birmingham; Attendance: 247

IFF

9 July 2022; 09:30	Thailand	1–20 (0–6, 1–6, 0–8)	Sweden	BJCC East Exhibition Hall, Birmingham; Attendance: 259

IFF

9 July 2022; 15:30	Switzerland	5–6 (2–2, 2–2, 1–2)	Latvia	BJCC East Exhibition Hall, Birmingham; Attendance: 603

IFF

10 July 2022; 09:30	Thailand	2–15 (1–5, 1–3, 0–7)	Latvia	BJCC East Exhibition Hall, Birmingham; Attendance: 156

IFF

10 July 2022; 12:00	Switzerland	0–3 (0–2, 0–1, 0–0)	Sweden	BJCC East Exhibition Hall, Birmingham; Attendance: 281

IFF

==== Group B ====
Pos	Team	Pld	W	D	L	GF	GA	GD	Pts	Qualification
1	Finland	3	3	0	0	39	3	+36	6	Semifinals
2	Czech Republic	3	2	0	1	33	6	+27	4	Semifinals
3	Canada	3	1	0	2	9	38	−29	2	Fifth place game
4	United States (H)	3	0	0	3	4	38	−34	0	Seventh place game

Source: IFF
(H) Hosts

8 July 2022; 12:00	Finland	18–0 (5–0, 6–0, 7–0)	Canada	BJCC East Exhibition Hall, Birmingham; Attendance: 119

IFF

8 July 2022; 18:15	Czech Republic	13–1 (3–0, 6–0, 4–1)	United States	BJCC East Exhibition Hall, Birmingham; Attendance: 179

IFF

9 July 2022; 12:00	Finland	5–3 (2–0, 2–1, 1–2)	Czech Republic	BJCC East Exhibition Hall, Birmingham; Attendance: 667

IFF

9 July 2022; 18:00	United States	3–9 (0–2, 1–2, 2–5)	Canada	BJCC East Exhibition Hall, Birmingham; Attendance: 703

IFF

10 July 2022; 15:30	Czech Republic	17–0 (4–0, 7–0, 6–0)	Canada	BJCC East Exhibition Hall, Birmingham; Attendance: 204

IFF

10 July 2022; 18:00	United States	0–16 (0–6, 0–6, 0–4)	Finland	BJCC East Exhibition Hall, Birmingham; Attendance: 228

IFF

=== Final round ===
==== Bracket ====
Semifinals
11 July
Sweden	6
Czech Republic	1
11 July
Finland	5
Latvia	1

Final
12 July
Sweden	6
Finland	5
Third place
12 July
Czech Republic	7
Latvia	3

==== Semifinals ====
11 July 2022; 09:30	Sweden	6–1 (3–0, 2–0, 1–1)	Czech Republic	BJCC East Exhibition Hall, Birmingham; Attendance: 135

IFF

11 July 2022; 12:15	Finland	5–1 (1–0, 1–0, 3–1)	Latvia	BJCC East Exhibition Hall, Birmingham; Attendance: 131

IFF

==== Seventh place game ====
11 July 2022; 15:00	United States	3–7 (2–5, 1–1, 0–1)	Thailand	BJCC East Exhibition Hall, Birmingham; Attendance: 163

IFF

==== Fifth place game ====
11 July 2022; 17:45	Switzerland	12–1 (2–1, 0–0, 10–0)	Canada	BJCC East Exhibition Hall, Birmingham; Attendance: 112

IFF

==== Bronze medal game ====
12 July 2022; 10:00	Czech Republic	7–3 (1–0, 2–1, 4–2)	Latvia	BJCC East Exhibition Hall, Birmingham; Attendance: 237

IFF

==== Gold medal game ====
12 July 2022; 13:00	Sweden	6–5 (0–1, 3–0, 3–4)	Finland	BJCC East Exhibition Hall, Birmingham; Attendance: 807

IFF

== Final ranking ==
Rank	Team
1st place, gold medalist(s)	Sweden
2nd place, silver medalist(s)	Finland
3rd place, bronze medalist(s)	Czech Republic
4	Latvia
5	Switzerland
6	Canada
7	Thailand
8	United States
