= Sweden at the 2022 World Games =

- IOC code: SWE
- NOC: Swedish Olympic Committee

in Birmingham, United States 7 July 2022 – 17 July 2022
- Competitors: 56 (32 men and 24 women) in 15 sports
- Medals Ranked 19th: Gold 3 Silver 6 Bronze 5 Total 14

World Games appearances
- 1981; 1985; 1989; 1993; 1997; 2001; 2005; 2009; 2013; 2017; 2022; 2025

Sweden competed at the 2022 World Games held in Birmingham, United States from 7 to 17 July 2022. Athletes representing Sweden won three gold medals, six silver medals and five bronze medals. The country finished in 19th place in the medal table.

== Medalists ==
Medal	Name	Sport	Event	Date
Gold	Miranda Tibbling	Parkour	Women's speedrun	10 July
Gold	Men's team	Floorball	Men's tournament	12 July
Gold	Erik Jonsson	Archery	Men's individual barebow	15 July
Silver	Elis Torhall	Parkour	Men's freestyle	10 July
Silver	Miranda Tibbling	Parkour	Women's freestyle	11 July
Silver	Martin Regborn	Orienteering	Men's sprint	15 July
Silver	Leo Pettersson	Archery	Men's individual barebow	15 July
Silver	Women's team	Tug of war	Women's outdoor 540 kg	15 July
Silver	Sofia Ohlsson	Orienteering	Women's middle distance	16 July
Bronze	Jenny Wegner	Bowling	Women's singles	11 July
Bronze	Lina Björklund	Archery	Women's individual barebow	15 July
Bronze	Martin Regborn	Orienteering	Men's middle distance	16 July
Bronze	Lina Sjöberg	Trampoline gymnastics	Women's double mini-trampoline	17 July
Bronze	Patricia Axling	Muaythai	Women's 54 kg	17 July

== Competitors ==
The following is the list of number of competitors in the Games.

Sport	Men	Women	Total
Air sports	2	0	2
Archery	3	3	6
Bowling	0	2	2
Canoe marathon	1	1	2
Cue sports	1	0	1
Floorball	14	0	14
Ju-jitsu	0	1	1
Karate	0	1	1
Muaythai	0	2	2
Orienteering	3	2	5
Parkour	1	1	2
Powerlifting	1	0	1
Trampoline gymnastics	1	1	2
Tug of war	5	9	14
Water skiing	0	1	1
Total	32	24	56

== Air sports ==
Sweden competed in air sports and drone racing.

== Archery ==
Sweden won three medals in archery.

== Bowling ==
Sweden won one bronze medal in bowling.

== Canoe marathon ==
Sweden competed in canoe marathon.

== Cue sports ==
Sweden competed in cue sports.

== Floorball ==
Sweden won the floorball tournament.

Summary

Team	Event	Group stage				Semifinal	Final / BM / Pl.	
Team	Event	Opposition Score	Opposition Score	Opposition Score	Rank	Opposition Score	Opposition Score	Rank
Sweden men's	Men's tournament	Latvia; D 6–6	Thailand; W 20–1	Switzerland; W 3–0	1 Q	Czech Republic; W 6–1	Finland; W 6–5	1st place, gold medalist(s)

Group play

Pos	Team	Pld	W	D	L	GF	GA	GD	Pts	Qualification
1	Sweden	3	2	1	0	29	7	+22	5	Semifinals
2	Latvia	3	2	1	0	27	13	+14	5	Semifinals
3	Switzerland	3	1	0	2	15	12	+3	2	Fifth place game
4	Thailand	3	0	0	3	6	45	−39	0	Seventh place game

Source: IFF

8 July 2022; 09:30	Sweden	6–6 (2–1, 2–4, 2–1)	Latvia	BJCC East Exhibition Hall, Birmingham; Attendance: 456

IFF

9 July 2022; 09:30	Thailand	1–20 (0–6, 1–6, 0–8)	Sweden	BJCC East Exhibition Hall, Birmingham; Attendance: 259

IFF

10 July 2022; 12:00	Switzerland	0–3 (0–2, 0–1, 0–0)	Sweden	BJCC East Exhibition Hall, Birmingham; Attendance: 281

IFF

Semifinal

11 July 2022; 09:30	Sweden	6–1 (3–0, 2–0, 1–1)	Czech Republic	BJCC East Exhibition Hall, Birmingham; Attendance: 135

IFF

Gold medal game

12 July 2022; 13:00	Sweden	6–5 (0–1, 3–0, 3–4)	Finland	BJCC East Exhibition Hall, Birmingham; Attendance: 807

IFF

== Ju-jitsu ==
Sweden competed in ju-jitsu.

== Karate ==
One competitor represented Sweden in karate.

Athlete	Event	Elimination round				Semifinal	Final / BM	
Athlete	Event	Opposition Result	Opposition Result	Opposition Result	Rank	Opposition Result	Opposition Result	Rank
Anna-Johanna Nilsson	Women's kumite 61 kg	Grande (PER); L 2–3	Jumaa (CAN); L 0–2	Suchánková (SVK); L 2–4	4	Did not advance		7

== Muaythai ==
Sweden won one bronze medal in muaythai.

== Orienteering ==
Sweden won three medals in orienteering.

== Parkour ==
Sweden won three medals in parkour.

== Powerlifting ==
Sweden competed in powerlifting.

Athlete	Event	Exercises			Total weight	Total points	Rank
Athlete	Event	Squat	Bench press	Deadlift	Total weight	Total points	Rank
Oliver Dahlkvist	Men's heavyweight	400.0	300.0	300.0	1000.0	102.44	4

== Trampoline gymnastics ==
Sweden won one bronze medal in trampoline gymnastics.

== Tug of war ==
Sweden won one silver medal in tug of war.

== Water skiing ==
Sweden competed in water skiing.
