= Bowling at the 2022 World Games – Women's singles =

Bowling – Women's singles at the 2022 World Games
- Venue: Birmingham–Jefferson Convention Complex, Birmingham, United States
- Dates: 8–11 July 2022
- Competitors: 32 from 16 nations

Medalists
gold medal	(United States) Shannon O'Keefe
silver medal	(Colombia) Clara Guerrero
bronze medal	(Sweden) Jenny Wegner

The women's singles event in bowling at the 2022 World Games took place from 8 to 11 July 2022 at the Birmingham–Jefferson Convention Complex in Birmingham, United States.

== Competition format ==
A total of 32 athletes entered the competition. They competed in knock-out system.

== Results ==
=== Competition bracket ===
Round of 32; 8 July
(Puerto Rico) Taishaye Naranjo	2
(Malaysia) Natasha Mohamed Roslan	1
(France) Solene Goron	2
(Mexico) Iliana Lomeli	1
(United States) Shannon O'Keefe	2
(Denmark) Mai Ginge Jensen	0
(Germany) Birgit Noreiks	1
(Australia) Rebekah Commane	2
(South Korea) Yang Soo-jin	2
(Chinese Taipei) Huang Chiung-yao	1
(Sweden) Jenny Wegner	2
(South Africa) Ursula Ekermans	0
(Netherlands) Denise Blankenzee	2
(Singapore) Hui Fen New	0
(Colombia) Juliana Franco	2
(Aruba) Eva Maduro	0
(Mexico) Aseret Zetter	1
(Sweden) Cajsa Wegner	2
(Netherlands) Samantha Greiner	0
(Germany) Janin Ribguth	2
(Singapore) Cherie Tan	2
(France) Alexandra Lopes D'Andrade	0
(United States) Julia Bond	0
(Aruba) Kamilah Dammers	2
(Puerto Rico) Pamela Perez	2
(South Africa) Gitabalie Soorajlal	1
(Denmark) Mika Guldbaek	0
(Australia) Rebekah Martin	2
(Colombia) Clara Guerrero	2
(Chinese Taipei) Chien Hsiu-lan	0
(Malaysia) Li Jane Sin	2
(South Korea) Kim Hyun-mi	1

Round of 16; 10 July
(Puerto Rico) Taishaye Naranjo	0
(France) Solene Goron	2
(United States) Shannon O'Keefe	2
(Australia) Rebekah Commane	0
(South Korea) Yang Soo-jin	0
(Sweden) Jenny Wegner	2
(Netherlands) Denise Blankenzee	2
(Colombia) Juliana Franco	0
(Sweden) Cajsa Wegner	0
(Germany) Janin Ribguth	2
(Singapore) Cherie Tan	2
(Aruba) Kamilah Dammers	0
(Puerto Rico) Pamela Perez	0
(Australia) Rebekah Martin	2
(Colombia) Clara Guerrero	2
(Malaysia) Li Jane Sin	0

Quarter-finals; 10 July
(France) Solene Goron	1
(United States) Shannon O'Keefe	2'
(Sweden) Jenny Wegner	2
(Netherlands) Denise Blankenzee	1
(Germany) Janin Ribguth	2
(Singapore) Cherie Tan	1
(Australia) Rebekah Martin	0
(Colombia) Clara Guerrero	2

Semi-finals; 10 July
(United States) Shannon O'Keefe	2
(Sweden) Jenny Wegner	1
(Germany) Janin Ribguth	1
(Colombia) Clara Guerrero	2

Finals; 11 July
(United States) Shannon O'Keefe	2
(Colombia) Clara Guerrero	1
Third place
(Sweden) Jenny Wegner	2
(Germany) Janin Ribguth	1
