= South Africa at the 2022 World Games =

- IOC code: RSA
- NOC: South African Sports Confederation and Olympic Committee

in Birmingham, United States 7 July 2022 – 17 July 2022
- Competitors: 21 (12 men and 9 women) in 10 sports
- Medals Ranked 47th: Gold 1 Silver 0 Bronze 0 Total 1

World Games appearances
- 1981; 1985; 1989; 1993; 1997; 2001; 2005; 2009; 2013; 2017; 2022; 2025

South Africa competed at the 2022 World Games held in Birmingham, United States from 7 to 17 July 2022. Athletes representing South Africa won one gold medal and the country finished in 47th place in the medal table.

== Medalists ==
Medal	Name	Sport	Event	Date
Gold	Andy Birkett	Canoe marathon	Men's standard distance	12 July

== Competitors ==
The following is the list of number of competitors in the Games.

Sport	Men	Women	Total
Air sports	1	0	1
Archery	2	2	4
Bowling	2	2	4
Canoe marathon	1	1	2
Cue sports	1	0	1
Duathlon	2	1	3
Powerlifting	0	1	1
Rhythmic gymnastics	—	1	1
Sport climbing	2	1	3
Water skiing	1	0	1
Total	12	9	21

== Air sports ==
South Africa competed in air sports.

== Archery ==
South Africa competed in archery.

== Bowling ==
South Africa competed in bowling.

== Canoe marathon ==
South Africa won one medal in canoe marathon.

== Cue sports ==
South Africa competed in cue sports.

== Duathlon ==
South Africa competed in duathlon.

== Powerlifting ==
South Africa competed in powerlifting.

Athlete	Event	Exercises			Total weight	Total points	Rank
Athlete	Event	Squat	Bench press	Deadlift	Total weight	Total points	Rank
Christi Rees	Women's super heavyweight	207.5	—	170.0	—	—	DSQ

== Rhythmic gymnastics ==
South Africa competed in rhythmic gymnastics.

== Sport climbing ==
South Africa competed in sport climbing.

== Water skiing ==
South Africa competed in water skiing.
