= Squash at the 2022 World Games – Women's singles =

Squash women's singles at the 2022 World Games
- Venue: University of Alabama Birmingham; Birmingham, United States
- Dates: 13–17 July 2022
- Competitors: 30 from 19 nations

Medalists
gold medal	(Belgium) Tinne Gilis
silver medal	(United Kingdom) Lucy Beecroft
bronze medal	(France) Coline Aumard

The women's singles squash competition at the 2022 World Games took place from 13 to 17 July 2022 at the University of Alabama Birmingham in Birmingham, United States.

== Competition format ==
A total of 30 athletes entered the competition. Players competed in classic cup system.

== Seeds ==
1. (Belgium) Tinne Gilis (champion)
2. (France) Mélissa Alves (quarter-finals)
3. (France) Coline Aumard (third place)
4. (Czech Republic) Anna Serme (round of 32)
5. (Finland) Emilia Soini (round of 16)
6. (United Kingdom) Lucy Beecroft (runner-up)
7. (United States) Haley Mendez (Fourth place)
8. (Japan) Satomi Watanabe (round of 16)

== Results ==
Round of 32
(Ecuador) María Moya	1
9/16	(Canada) Nikki Todd	2
9/16	(United States) Marina Stefanoni	2
(Colombia) Laura Tovar	0
(Ukraine) Nadiya Usenko	0
5/8	(Japan) Satomi Watanabe	2
5/8	(Finland) Emilia Soini	2
(Hong Kong) Heylie Fung	0
(Hungary) Kincső Szász	0
9/16	(Germany) Saskia Beinhard	2
9/16	(Australia) Jessica Turnbull	2
(China) Jia Liu	0
(Switzerland) Céline Walser	0
3/4	(France) Coline Aumard	2
3/4	(Czech Republic) Anna Serme	1
(Germany) Katerina Týcová	2
(Finland) Riina Koskinen	0
9/16	(Australia) Alex Haydon	2
9/16	(Hong Kong) Cheng Nga Ching	2
(Ukraine) Anastasiia Kostiukova	0
(Hungary) Hannah Chukwu	0
5/8	(United Kingdom) Lucy Beecroft	2
5/8	(United States) Haley Mendez	2
(Japan) Erisa Sano Herring	1
(Colombia) Lucía Bautista	0
9/16	(Poland) Karina Tyma	2
9/16	(Switzerland) Nadia Pfister	2
(Canada) Hannah Blatt	1

Round of 16
1	(Belgium) Tinne Gilis	2
9/16	(Canada) Nikki Todd	0
9/16	(United States) Marina Stefanoni	2
5/8	(Japan) Satomi Watanabe	0
5/8	(Finland) Emilia Soini	0
9/16	(Germany) Saskia Beinhard	2
9/16	(Australia) Jessica Turnbull	0
3/4	(France) Coline Aumard	2
(Germany) Katerina Týcová	2
9/16	(Australia) Alex Haydon	0
9/16	(Hong Kong) Cheng Nga Ching	0
5/8	(United Kingdom) Lucy Beecroft	2
5/8	(United States) Haley Mendez	2
(Poland) Karina Tyma	1
9/16	(Switzerland) Nadia Pfister	0
2	(France) Mélissa Alves	2

Quarter finals
1	(Belgium) Tinne Gilis	2
9/16	(United States) Marina Stefanoni	0
9/16	(Germany) Saskia Beinhard	0
3/4	(France) Coline Aumard	2
(Germany) Katerina Týcová	0
5/8	(United Kingdom) Lucy Beecroft	2
5/8	(United States) Haley Mendez	2
2	(France) Mélissa Alves	1

Semi-finals
1	(Belgium) Tinne Gilis	3
3/4	(France) Coline Aumard	0
5/8	(United Kingdom) Lucy Beecroft	3
5/8	(United States) Haley Mendez	0

Finals
1	(Belgium) Tinne Gilis	3
5/8	(United Kingdom) Lucy Beecroft	0

3rd place
3/4	(France) Coline Aumard	3
5/8	(United States) Haley Mendez	2
