= Lucy Beecroft =

English squash player (born 1996)

Personal information
- Nickname: Beeza
- Born: 7 October 1996 (age 29) Northumbria, England

Sport
- Country: England
- Turned pro: 2013
- Coached by: Peter Nicol
- Retired: Active
- Racquet used: 305SQUASH ProCell XE110

Women's singles
- Highest ranking: No. 20 (July 2024)
- Current ranking: No. 38 (14 July 2025)
Medal record
Women's squash
Representing United Kingdom
World Games
Silver medal – second place	2022 Birmingham	Individual
Representing England
European Team Championships
Gold medal – first place	2023 Helsinki	Team

Lucy Beecroft (born 7 October 1996) is a professional squash player who represents England. She reached a career high ranking of number 20 in the world during July 2024.

== Biography ==
In 2023, Beecroft was part of the England squad that won the 2023 European Squash Team Championships in Helsinki.

In 2024, Beecroft was part of the England squad that reached the quarter-final of the 2024 World Team Championships before being eliminated by Malaysia.
