= Avondale (Birmingham) =

- Birmingham Neighborhood
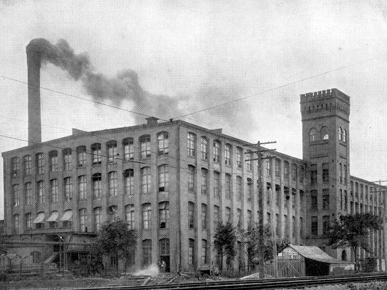
- Avondale Mills

- Location within Alabama
- Coordinates: 33°31′26.43″N 86°46′40.96″W
- Country: United States
- State: Alabama
- City: Birmingham
- Established: March 18, 1887
- Elevation: 643 ft (196 m)
- Time zone: UTC-6 (CST)
  - Summer (DST): UTC-5 (CDT)
- ZIP Codes: 35222
- Area codes: 205, 659

Avondale was a company town built around the Avondale Mills east of Birmingham, Alabama in Jefferson County. The town was incorporated on March 18, 1887. The city was annexed into Birmingham in 1910 and is now divided into three separate neighborhoods, North Avondale, East Avondale and South Avondale.

The first residents of the area were clustered around "King's Spring" on the slopes of Red Mountain, now the site of Avondale Park. There was once a small skirmish near the spring when Confederates fired on Union soldiers watering their horses. The wife of Jefferson County sheriff Abner Killough was struck in the breast by a stray shot while sitting on her porch. Her wound is believed to have been the only blood spilled in the county during the war.

The park was the largest in Birmingham until Ruffner Mountain Park was dedicated. It was known for the spring-fed grotto pool, an extensive rose garden, athletic fields, a secluded pavilion called "The Villa", and a large amphitheater that hosted a spectacular pageant in celebration of Birmingham's 50th anniversary in 1931. The park was also one-time home of the Birmingham Zoo, which at the time consisted mainly of non-exotic species with the exception of "Miss Fancy", an erstwhile circus elephant purchased by the Birmingham Advertising Club as a promotional novelty and then donated to the city.

The spring emerged from a cave, now sealed off and proceeded to flow through the center of Spring Street (now 41st Street), the primary commercial center of Avondale.

By the early seventies Avondale Park had developed a reputation as a drug-dealing area and the vicinity entered a long period of decline. However, the park has since seen a rebirth. In 2011, the city of Birmingham undertook a $2.88 million restoration of the park. In 2013, The Forest Park South Avondale Business Association sponsored the installation of free WiFi throughout the park.

Beginning around 2011, the neighborhood redeveloped as a restaurant and entertainment destination featuring several breweries and concert venues. Avondale Park was a site for events in the 2022 World Games.

The neighborhood is notable for its religious diversity, including Baha'i, Buddhist, and Quaker centers along with the regionally predominant Baptist and Methodist churches.

== Demographics ==
Historical population
| Census | Pop. | Note | %± |
|---|---|---|---|
| 1890 | 1,642 | | — |
| 1900 | 3,060 | | 86.4% |
U.S. Decennial Census

Avondale was listed on the 1890 and 1900 U.S. Censuses as an incorporated town. It was annexed by the city of Birmingham in 1910 and did not appear separately on that census. In 1900, it had 1,585 males (51.8%) and 1,475 females (48.2%).

== Photo Gallery ==
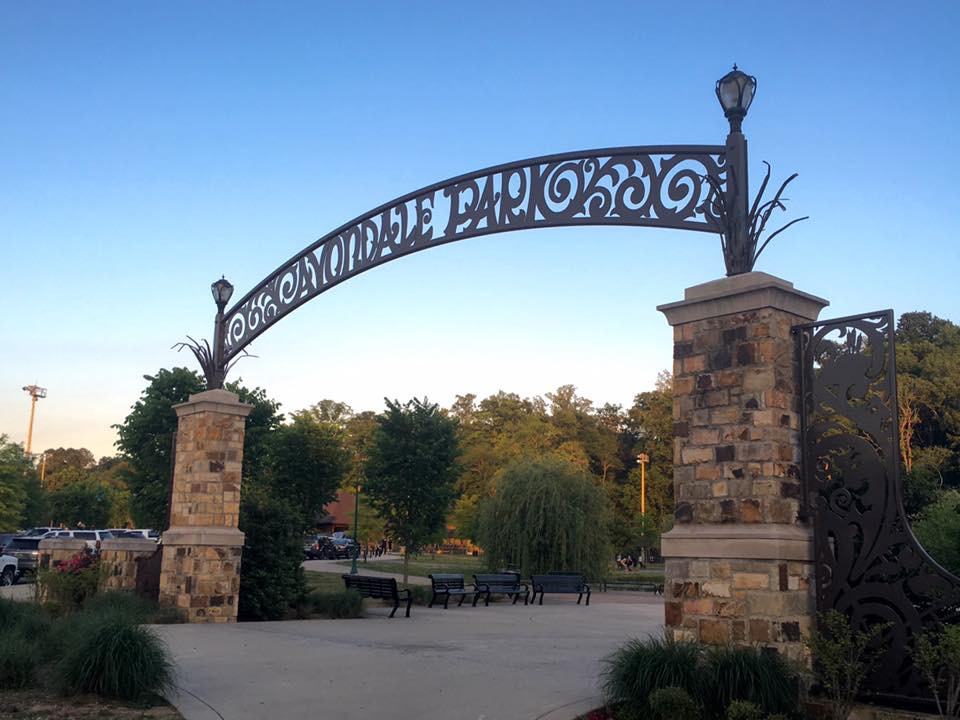
Avondale Park

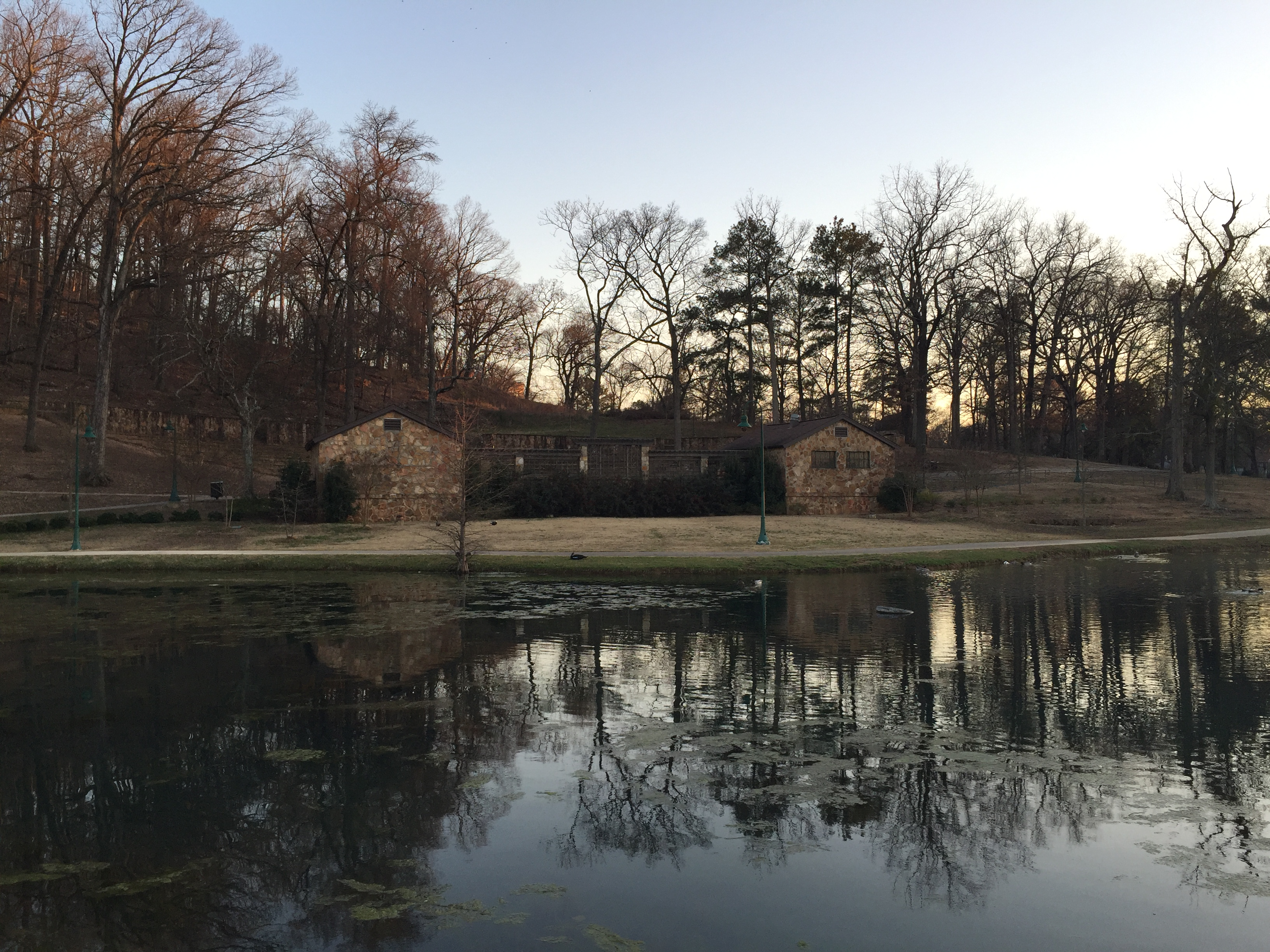
Avondale Park

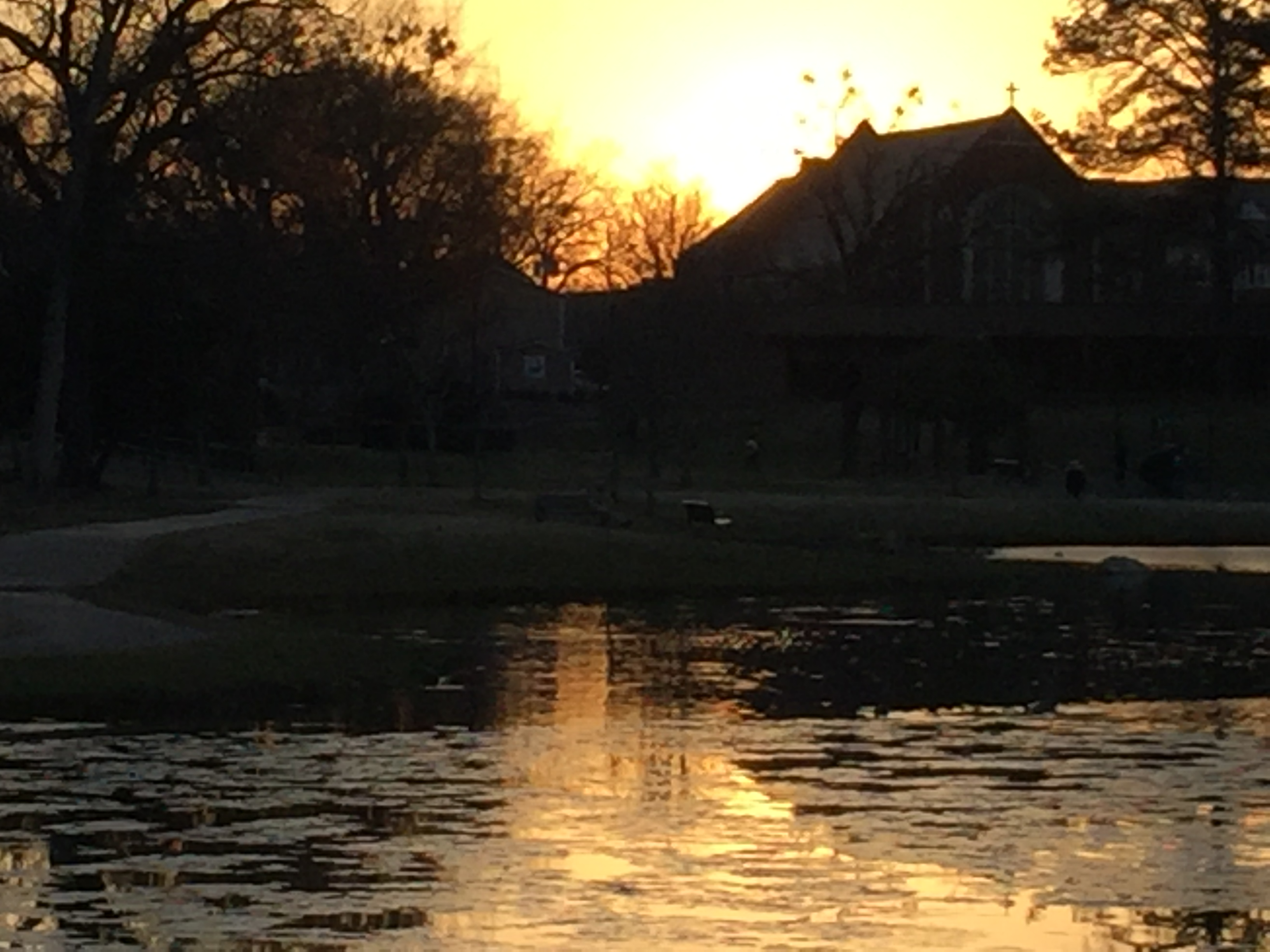
Avondale Park

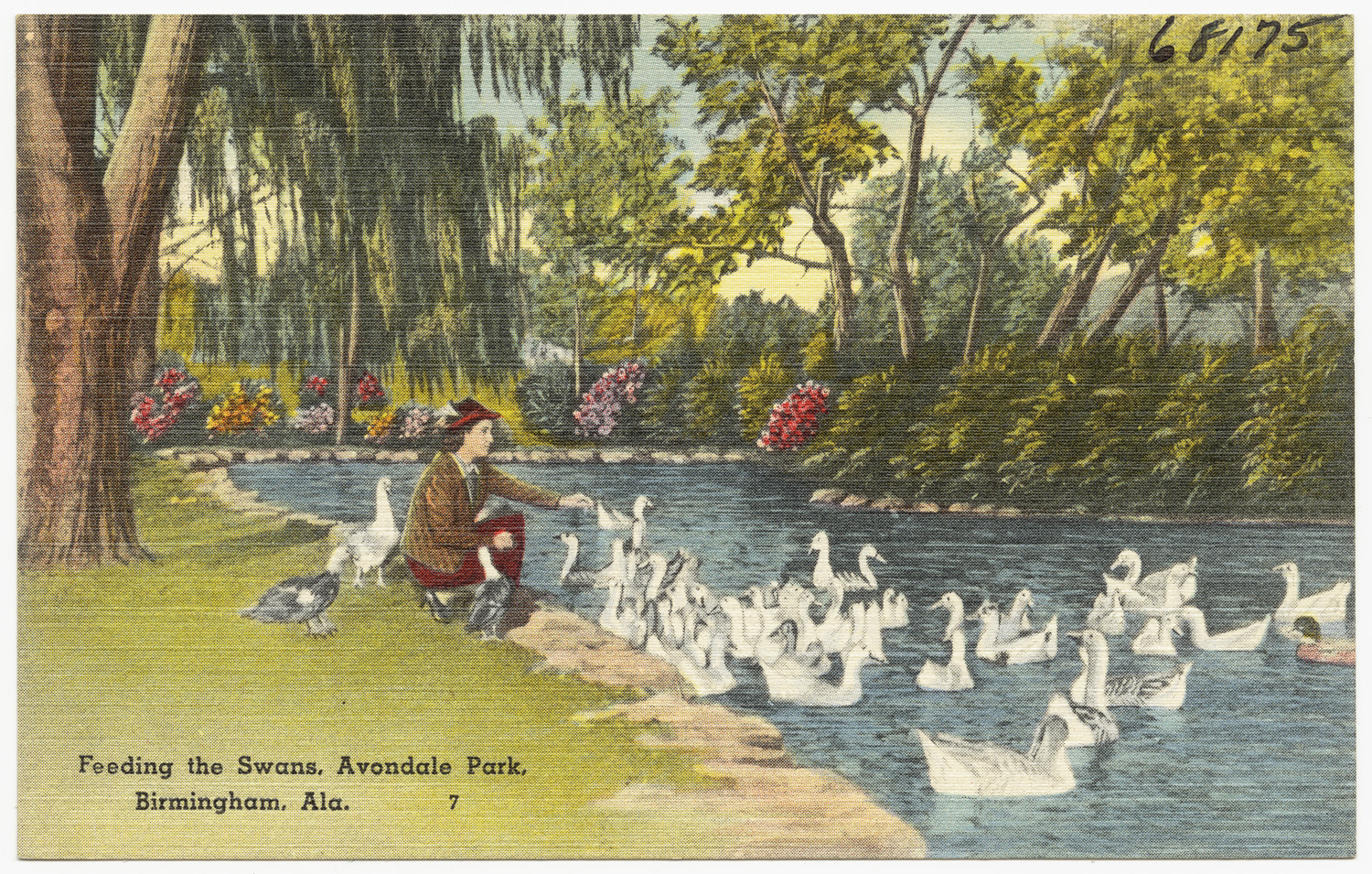
Avondale Park

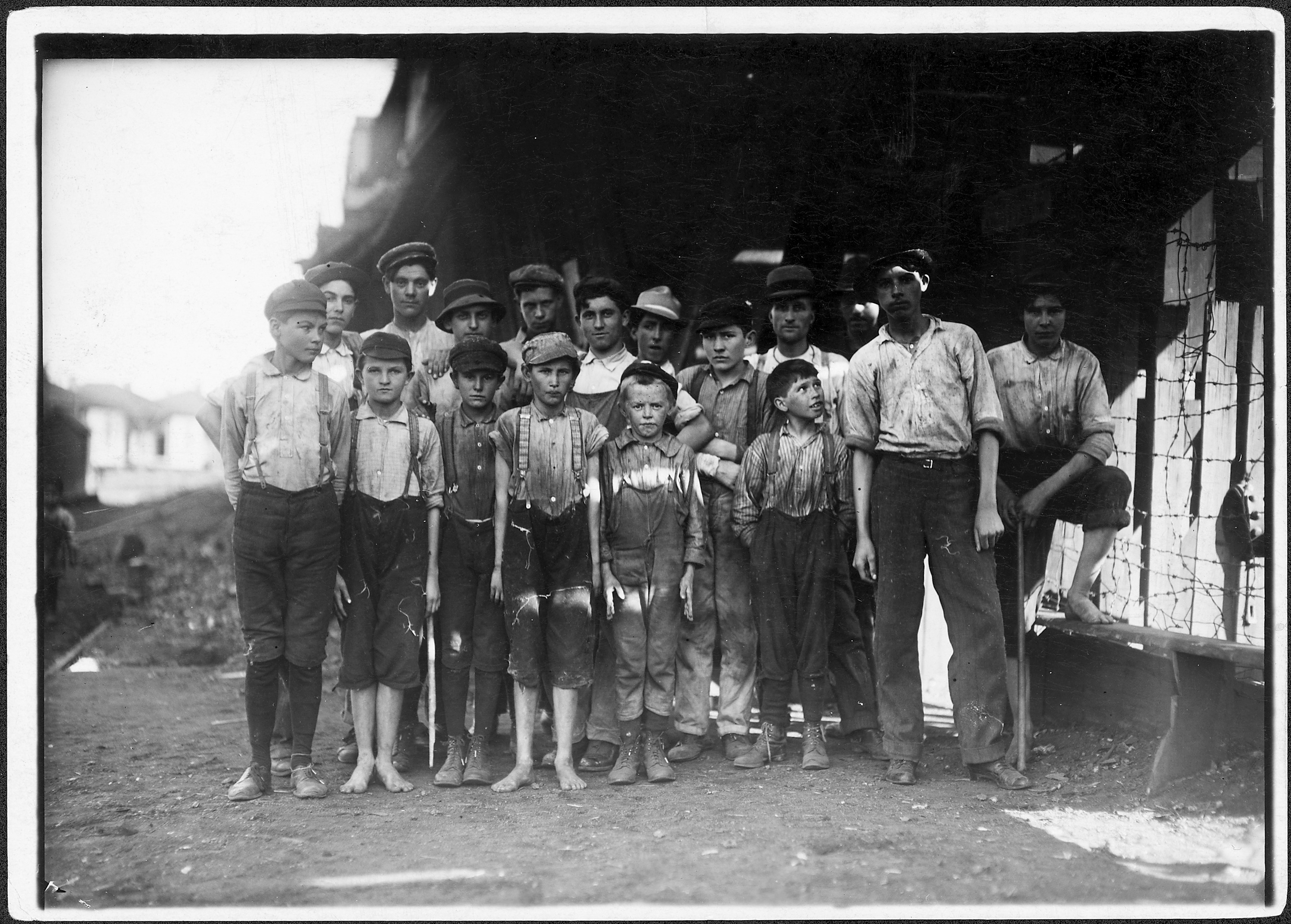
Child laborers at Avondale Mills

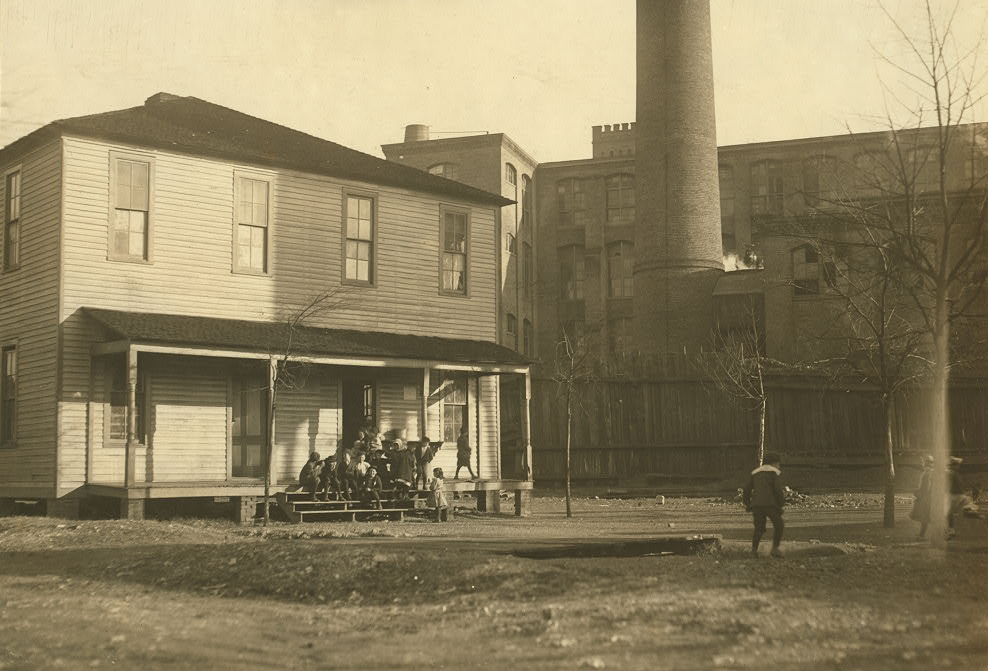
Avondale Mill School

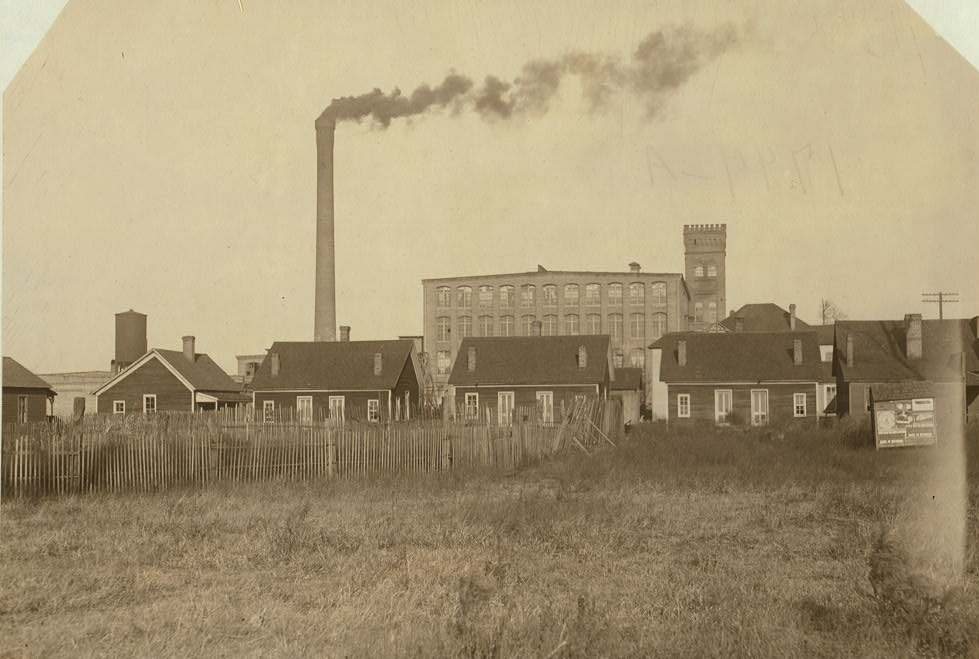
Avondale Mill Village

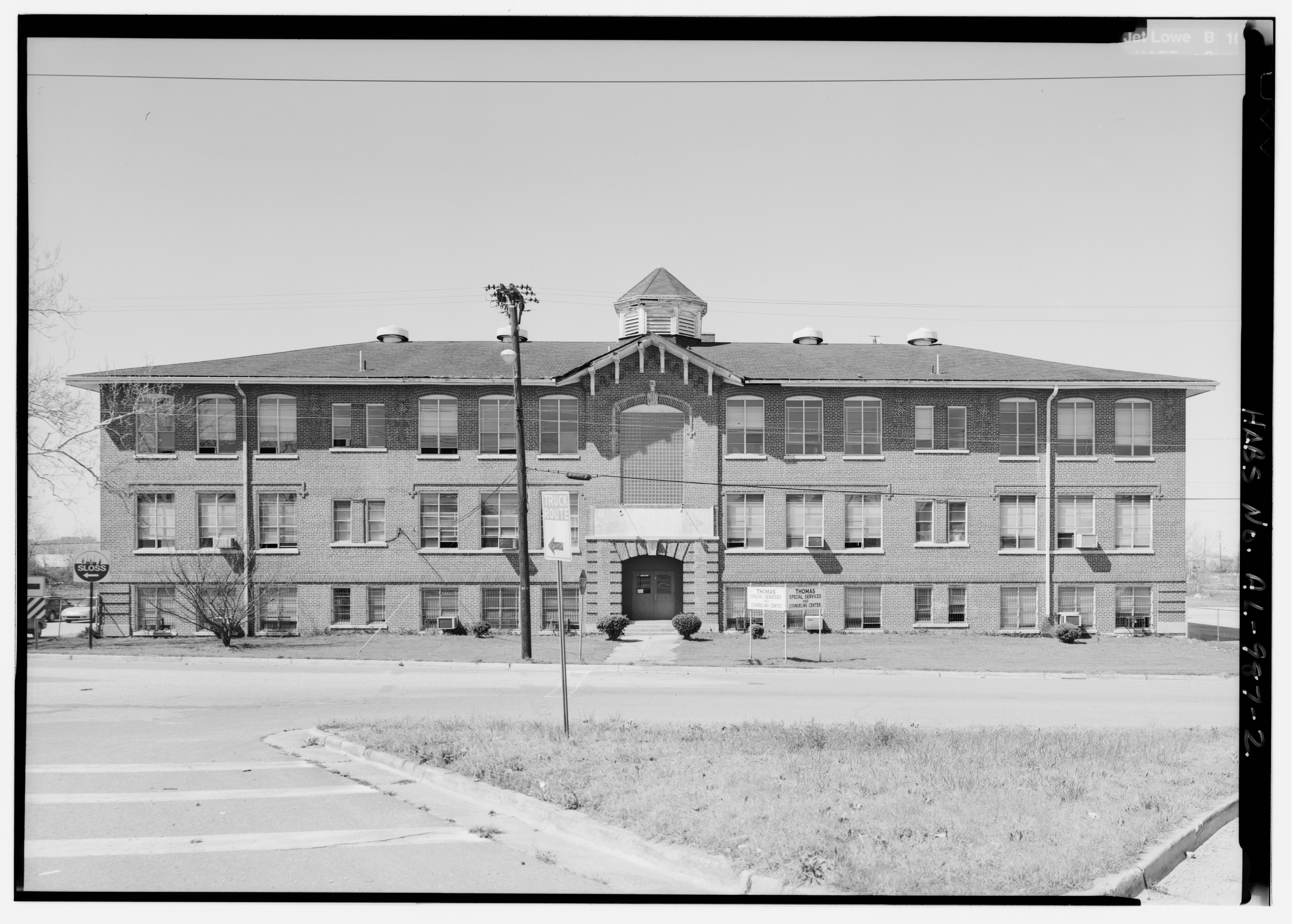
Thomas School, Avondale (Birmingham)

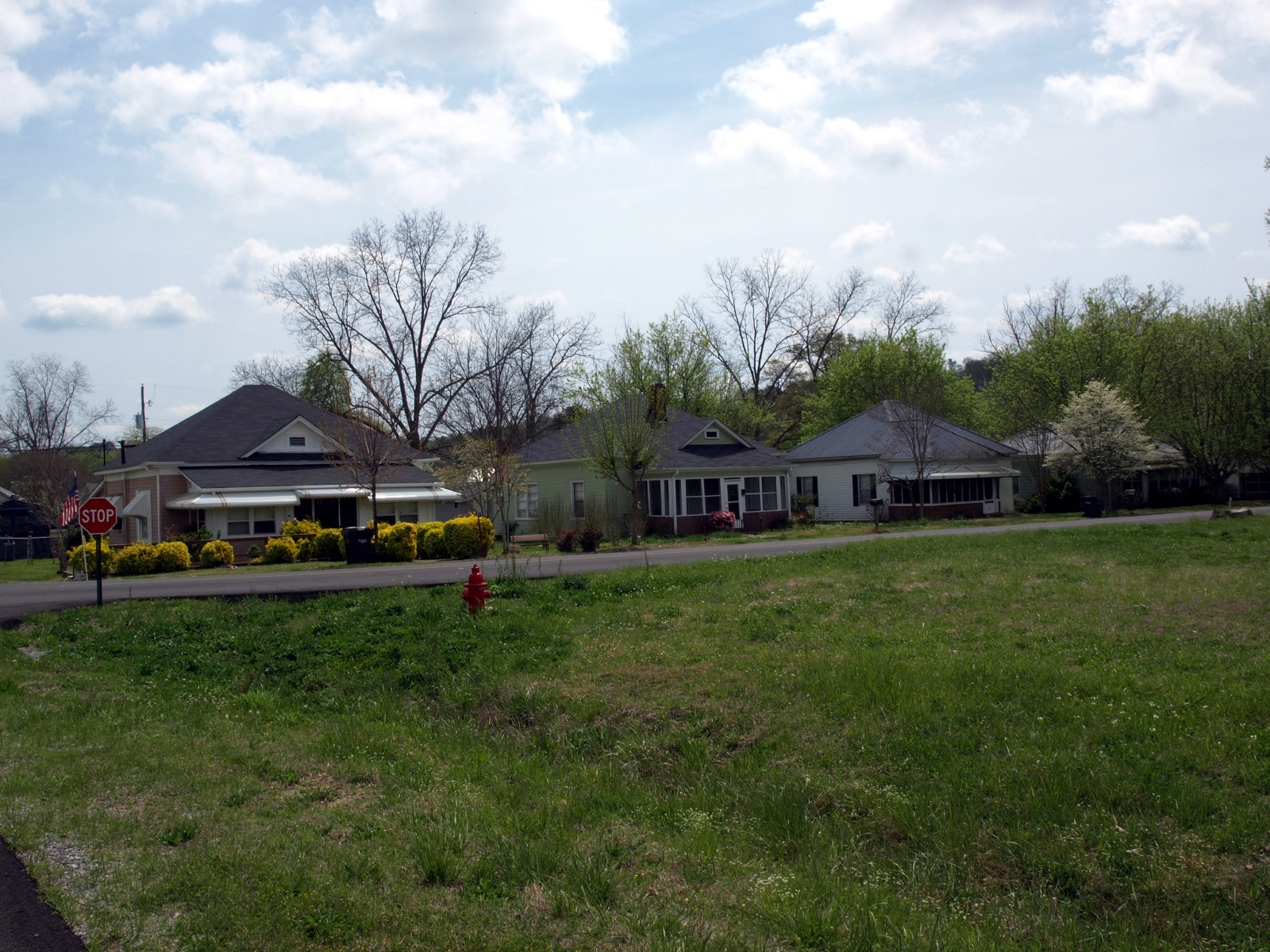
Avondale Historic District Homes

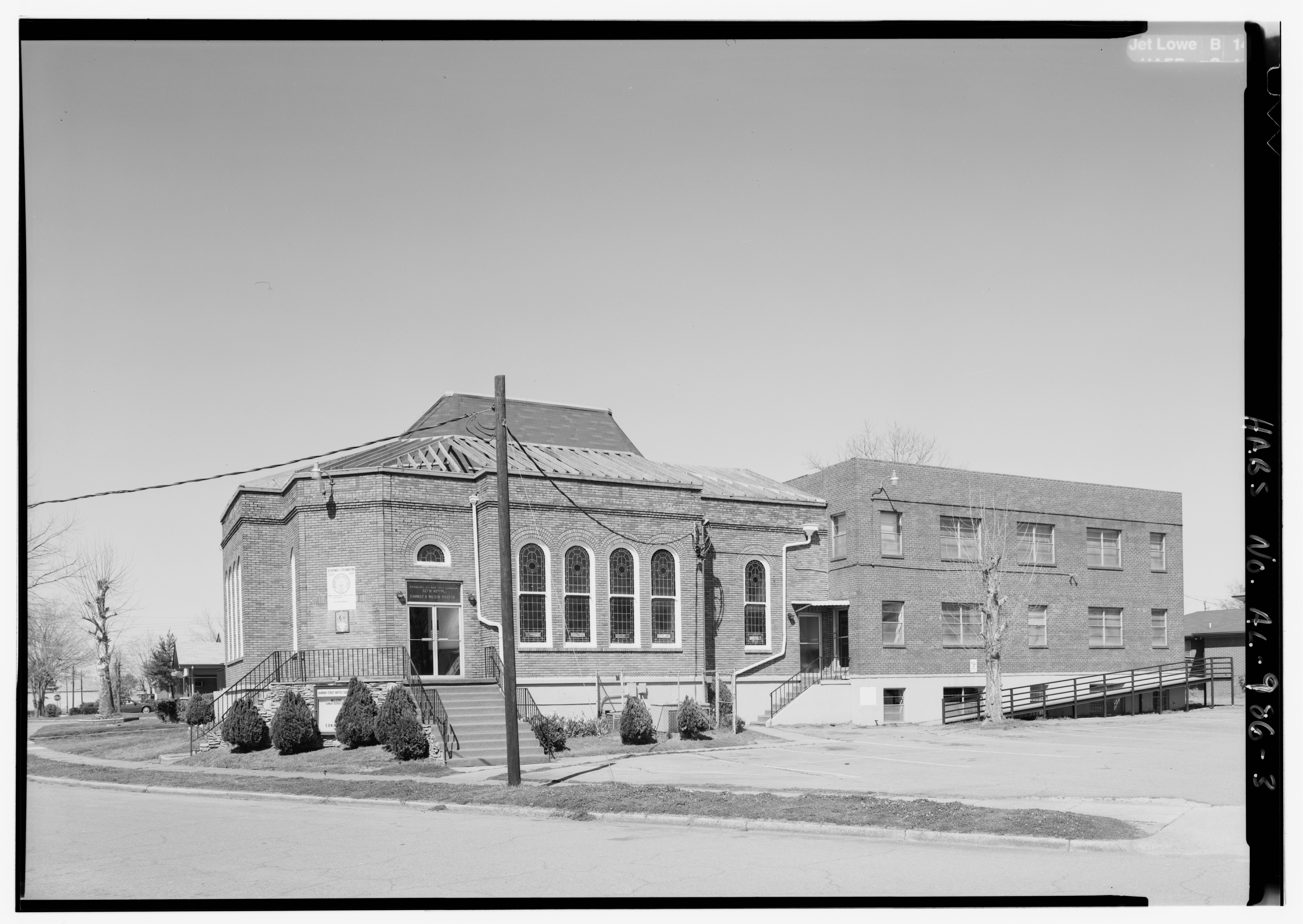
Harmony Street Baptist Church, Avondale (Birmingham)

== See also ==
- Birmingham, Alabama
- Avondale Mills
