= Slovenia at the 2022 World Games =

- IOC code: SLO
- NOC: Slovenian Olympic Committee

in Birmingham, United States 7 July 2022 – 17 July 2022
- Competitors: 18 (7 men and 11 women) in 7 sports
- Medals Ranked 38th: Gold 1 Silver 1 Bronze 3 Total 5

World Games appearances
- 1981; 1985; 1989; 1993; 1997; 2001; 2005; 2009; 2013; 2017; 2022; 2025

Slovenia competed at the 2022 World Games held in Birmingham, United States from 7 to 17 July 2022. Athletes representing Slovenia won one gold medal, one silver medal and three bronze medals. The country finished in 38th place in the medal table.

== Medalists ==
Medal	Name	Sport	Event	Date
Gold	Maja Povšnar	Ju-jitsu	Women's ne-waza 63 kg	15 July
Silver	Katja Debevec	Sport climbing	Women's boulder	15 July
Bronze	Ekaterina Vedeneeva	Rhythmic gymnastics	Clubs	13 July
Bronze	Tim Toplak	Ju-jitsu	Men's fighting 69 kg	16 July
Bronze	Lana Skušek	Sport climbing	Women's lead	16 July

== Competitors ==
The following is the list of number of competitors in the Games.

Sport	Men	Women	Total
Archery	2	3	5
Boules sports	0	2	2
Dancesport	1	1	2
Ju-jitsu	1	1	2
Kickboxing	1	0	1
Rhythmic gymnastics	—N/a	1	1
Sport climbing	2	3	5
Total	7	11	18

== Archery ==
Slovenia competed in archery.

== Boules sports ==
Slovenia competed in boules sports.

== Dancesport ==
Slovenia competed in dancesport.

== Ju-jitsu ==
Slovenia won two medals in ju-jitsu.

== Kickboxing ==
Slovenia competed in kickboxing.

Athlete	Category	Quarterfinals	Semifinals	Final/Bronze medal bout	
Athlete	Category	Opposition Result	Opposition Result	Opposition Result	Rank
Žiga Pečnik	Men's 75 kg	Zeloni (ITA); L 0–3	did not advance		

== Rhythmic gymnastics ==
Slovenia won one bronze medal in rhythmic gymnastics.

== Sport climbing ==
Slovenia won two medals in sport climbing.
