= Track speed skating at the 2022 World Games – Men's 1000 m sprint =

Men's 1000 m sprint at the 2022 World Games
- Venue: Birmingham CrossPlex, Birmingham, United States
- Date: 9 July 2022
- Competitors: 27 from 18 nations

Medalists
gold medal	(Italy) Duccio Marsili
silver medal	(Chile) Ricardo Verdugo
bronze medal	(Belgium) Bart Swings

The men's 1000 m sprint competition in track speed skating at the 2022 World Games took place on 9 July 2022 at the Birmingham CrossPlex in Birmingham, United States.

== Competition format ==
A total of 27 athletes entered the competition. Winners of each preliminary round heats and next 12 fastest athletes advances to the semifinal. Winners of each semifinal and next 6 fastest athletes advances to the final.

== Results ==
=== Preliminary round ===
Heat 1

Rank	Name	Country	Time	Notes
1	Andrés Jiménez	Colombia	1:23.633	Q
2	Duccio Marsili	Italy	1:23.748	Q
3	Giuseppe Bramante	Italy	1:23.786	Q
4	Jorge Luis Martínez	Mexico	1:23.960	
5	Mike Alejandro Paez	Mexico	1:24.302	
6	Jose Moncada	Paraguay	1:26.674	
7	Dhanush Babu	India	1:32.871	

Heat 3

Rank	Name	Country	Time	Notes
1	Yvan Sivilier	France	1:25.276	Q
2	Simon Albrecht	Germany	1:25.406	Q
3	Kuo Li-yang	Chinese Taipei	1:25.464	Q
4	Francisco Peula	Spain	1:25.628	
5	Santiago Roumec	Argentina	1:25.637	
6	Michael Garcia	United States	1:28.446	
7	Bayron Siles	Costa Rica	1:31.308	

Heat 2

Rank	Name	Country	Time	Notes
1	Daniel Zapata	Colombia	1:26.119	Q
2	Martin Ferrié	France	1:26.245	
3	Ku Chang-chin	Chinese Taipei	1:27.054	
4	Francisco Reyes	Argentina	1:27.543	
5	Christian Kromoser	Austria	1:27.598	
6	Walter Urrutia	Guatemala	1:27.725	
7	James Sadler	United States	1:28.276	

Heat 4

Rank	Name	Country	Time	Notes
1	Bart Swings	Belgium	1:24.765	Q
2	David Sarmiento	Ecuador	1:24.866	Q
3	Michal Prokop	Czech Republic	1:25.132	Q
4	Ricardo Verdugo	Chile	1:25.151	Q
5	Hugo Ramirez	Chile	1:25.235	Q
6	Nils Bühnemann	Germany	1:25.936	

=== Semifinals ===
Heat 1

Rank	Name	Country	Time	Notes
1	Andrés Jiménez	Colombia	1:24.449	Q
2	Duccio Marsili	Italy	1:24.668	Q
3	Simon Albrecht	Germany	1:24.773	
4	Daniel Zapata	Colombia	1:24.935	
5	Hugo Ramirez	Chile	1:24.970	
6	Santiago Roumec	Argentina	1:25.246	
7	Mike Alejandro Paez	Mexico	1:25.348	
8	David Sarmiento	Ecuador	1:25.499	

Heat 2

Rank	Name	Country	Time	Notes
1	Bart Swings	Belgium	1:23.931	Q
2	Giuseppe Bramante	Italy	1:24.188	Q
3	Francisco Peula	Spain	1:24.422	Q
4	Ricardo Verdugo	Chile	1:24.499	Q
5	Yvan Sivilier	France	1:24.743	Q
6	Michal Prokop	Czech Republic	1:25.053	
7	Kuo Li-yang	Chinese Taipei	1:25.476	
8	Jorge Luis Martínez	Mexico	1:25.595	

=== Final ===
Rank	Name	Country	Time
1st place, gold medalist(s)	Duccio Marsili	Italy	1:26.974
2nd place, silver medalist(s)	Ricardo Verdugo	Chile	1:27.026
3rd place, bronze medalist(s)	Bart Swings	Belgium	1:27.339
4	Simon Albrecht	Germany	1:27.609
5	Francisco Peula	Spain	1:27.887
6	Andrés Jiménez	Colombia	1:27.974
7	Yvan Sivilier	France	1:27.999
	Giuseppe Bramante	Italy	DSQ
