= Argentina at the 2022 World Games =

- IOC code: ARG
- NOC: Argentine Olympic Committee

in Birmingham, United States 7 July 2022 – 17 July 2022
- Competitors: 46 (25 men and 21 women) in 14 sports
- Medals Ranked 57th: Gold 0 Silver 1 Bronze 2 Total 3

World Games appearances (overview)
- 1981; 1985; 1989; 1993; 1997; 2001; 2005; 2009; 2013; 2017; 2022; 2025

Argentina competed at the 2022 World Games held in Birmingham, United States from 7 to 17 July 2022. Athletes representing Argentina won one silver medal and two bronze medals. The country finished in 57th place in the medal table.

== Medalists ==
Medal	Name	Sport	Event	Date
Silver	Eugenia de Armas	Water skiing	Women's wakeboard	16 July
Bronze	Argentina women's national beach handball team: Florencia Bericio; Gisella Bonomi; Fiorella Corimberto; Micaela Corimberto; Ivana Eliges; Celeste Meccia; Agustina Mirotta; Carolina Ponce; Luciana Scordamaglia; Gisela Thurmann	Beach handball	Women's tournament	15 July
Bronze	Tobías Giorgis	Water skiing	Men's jump	16 July

== Competitors ==
The following is the list of number of competitors in the Games:

Sport	Men	Women	Total
Artistic roller skating	0	1	1
Beach handball	10	10	20
Boules sports	0	1	1
Canoe marathon	1	1	2
Cue sports	0	1	1
Fistball	8	0	8
Racquetball	1	1	2
Road speed skating Track speed skating	2	2	4
Squash	1	0	1
Sumo	0	1	1
Trampoline gymnastics	1	1	2
Water skiing	1	1	2
Wushu	0	1	1
Total	25	21	46

== Beach handball ==
Argentina won one bronze medal in beach handball.

Men

Team	Event	Preliminary round				Main round			Semifinal / PM	Final / BM / PM	
Team	Event	Opposition Result	Opposition Result	Opposition Result	Rank	Opposition Result	Opposition Result	Rank	Opposition Result	Opposition Result	Rank
Argentina men's	Men's tournament	Brazil; L 0–2	United States; L 0–2	Puerto Rico; W 2–0	3	Qatar; L 0–2	Croatia; W 2–1	3	Placement match New Zealand; W 2–0	Placement match Puerto Rico; W 2–0	5

Women

Team	Event	Preliminary round						Semifinal	Final / BM / PM	
Team	Event	Opposition Result	Opposition Result	Opposition Result	Opposition Result	Opposition Result	Rank	Opposition Result	Opposition Result	Rank
Argentina women's	Women's tournament	Australia; W 2–0	Germany; L 1–2	United States; W 2–0	Norway; L 1–2	Mexico; W 0–2	3 Q	Norway; L 0–2	Bronze medal final United States; W 2–0	3rd place, bronze medalist(s)

== Boules sports ==
Argentina competed in boules sports.

Athlete	Event	Qualification				Semifinal	Final / BM	
Athlete	Event	Round 1	Round 2	Total	Rank	Opposition Result	Opposition Result	Rank
Carla Cabrera	Lyonnaise progressive	19	31	50	4 Q	Armanet (FRA); L 25–35	Bronze medal final Gamba (ITA); L 24–29	4

== Canoe marathon ==
Argentina competed in canoe marathon.

Athlete	Event	Heat		Final	
Athlete	Event	Time	Rank	Time	Rank
Franco Balboa	Men's short distance	15:22.38	9	Did not advance	18
Franco Balboa	Men's standard distance	—		DNS	
Cecilia Collueque	Women's short distance	16:34.71	6 Q	16:37.58	11
Cecilia Collueque	Women's standard distance	—		1:39:53.62	12

== Cue sports ==
Argentina competed in cue sports.

Athlete	Event	Round of 16	Quarterfinal	Semifinal	Final / BM	
Athlete	Event	Opposition Result	Opposition Result	Opposition Result	Opposition Result	Rank
Bernarda Ayala	Nine-ball	Ivanovskaia (GER); L 1–9	Did not advance			

== Fistball ==
Argentina competed in fistball.

Team	Event	Preliminary round				Semifinal	Final / BM / PM	
Team	Event	Opposition Result	Opposition Result	Opposition Result	Rank	Opposition Result	Opposition Result	Rank
Argentina men's	Men's tournament	Switzerland (SUI); L 0–3	Chile (CHI); L 0–3	Germany (GER); L 0–3	4	Did not advance	7th place match United States (USA); W 3–0	7

== Racquetball ==
Argentina competed in racquetball.

Athlete	Event	Round of 16	Quarterfinal	Semifinal	Final / BM	
Athlete	Event	Opposition Result	Opposition Result	Opposition Result	Opposition Result	Rank
Diego García	Men's singles	Montoya (MEX); L 14–15, 14–15, 15–12, 8–15	Did not advance			=9
Natalia Méndez	Women's singles	Lee (KOR); W 15–8, 15–4, 15–2	Barrios (BOL); L 9–15, 15—7, 14–15, 9–15	Did not advance		=5

== Roller skating ==
=== Artistic ===
Argentina competed in artistic roller skating.

Athlete	Event	SP / SD		LP / FD		Total	
Athlete	Event	Score	Rank	Score	Rank	Score	Rank
Carolina Burwan	Women's singles	41.71	7	72.19	7	113.90	7

=== Road ===
Argentina competed in road speed skating.

Athlete	Event	Heat		Quarterfinal		Semifinal		Final	
Athlete	Event	Time	Rank	Time	Rank	Time	Rank	Result	Rank
Francisco Manuel Reyes Petrelli	Men's 100 m	10.112	1 Q	10.182	2	Did not advance			7
Francisco Manuel Reyes Petrelli	Men's 1 lap	1:09.00	4	—		Did not advance			10
Santiago Ariel Roumec	Men's 10,000 m point race	—						0	10
Santiago Ariel Roumec	Men's 15,000 m elimination race	—						EL	14
Micaela Siri	Women's 100 m	11.986	2	Did not advance					13
Micaela Siri	Women's 1 lap	1:13.33	3	—		Did not advance			10
Rocio Berber Alt	Women's 10,000 m point race	—						2	6
Rocio Berber Alt	Women's 15,000 m elimination race	—						EL	14

=== Track ===
Argentina competed in track speed skating.

Men

Athlete	Event	Qualification		Heat		Semifinal		Final	
Athlete	Event	Time	Rank	Time	Rank	Time	Rank	Result	Rank
Francisco Manuel Reyes Petrelli	200 m time trial	18.416	8 Q	—				18.193	6
Francisco Manuel Reyes Petrelli	500 m sprint	—		44.813	4	Did not advance			11
Francisco Manuel Reyes Petrelli	1000 m sprint	—		1:27.543	4	Did not advance			21
Santiago Ariel Roumec	1000 m sprint	—		1:25.637	5 Q	1:25.246	6	Did not advance	12
Santiago Ariel Roumec	10,000 m elimination race	—						EL	7
Santiago Ariel Roumec	10,000 m point race	—						DNF	

Women

Athlete	Event	Qualification		Heat		Semifinal		Final	
Athlete	Event	Time	Rank	Time	Rank	Time	Rank	Result	Rank
Micaela Siri	200 m time trial	20.515	13	—				Did not advance	
Micaela Siri	500 m sprint	—		46.401	3 Q	47.412	3	Did not advance	6
Micaela Siri	1000 m sprint	—		1:33.631	6	Did not advance			22
Rocio Berber Alt	1000 m sprint	—		1:31.104	4 Q	1:31.545	5	Did not advance	10
Rocio Berber Alt	10,000 m elimination race	—						EL	13
Rocio Berber Alt	10,000 m point race	—						4	8

== Squash ==
Argentina competed in squash.

Athlete	Event	Round of 32	Round of 16 / CR	Quarterfinal / CQ	Semifinal / CS	Final / BM / CF	
Athlete	Event	Opposition Result	Opposition Result	Opposition Result	Opposition Result	Opposition Result	Rank
Jeremías Azaña	Men's singles	Švec (CZE); W 11–5, 10–12, 11–9	Rodríguez (COL); L 3–11, 4–11	Did not advance			=9

== Sumo ==
Argentina competed in sumo.

Athlete	Event	Round of 64	Round of 32	Round of 16	Quarterfinal	Semifinal	Repechage 1	Repechage 2	Repechage 3	Repechage 4	Repechage 5	Final / BM	
Athlete	Event	Opposition Result	Opposition Result	Opposition Result	Opposition Result	Opposition Result	Opposition Result	Opposition Result	Opposition Result	Opposition Result	Opposition Result	Opposition Result	Rank
Moira Santillan	Lightweight	—		Rickhoff (USA); W	Okutomi (JPN); L	Did not advance	Montgomery Watanabe (BRA); L	Did not advance		—		Did not advance	
Moira Santillan	Openweight	Yamanaka (JPN); L	Did not advance										

== Trampoline gymnastics ==
Argentina competed in trampoline gymnastics.

Athlete	Event	Qualification		Final 1		Final 2	
Athlete	Event	Score	Rank	Score	Rank	Score	Rank
Federico Cury	Men's double mini-trampoline	26.400	9	Did not advance			
Lucila Maldonado	Women's double mini-trampoline	DNF		Did not advance			

== Water skiing ==
Argentina won two medals in water skiing.

Men

Athlete	Event	Qualification		Final	
Athlete	Event	Result	Rank	Result	Rank
Tobías Giorgis	Jump	60.6	4 Q	62.1	3rd place, bronze medalist(s)
Tobías Giorgis	Trick	7970	8	Did not advance	

Women

Athlete	Event	Semifinal		Repechage		Final	
Athlete	Event	Result	Rank	Result	Rank	Result	Rank
Eugenia de Armas	Wakeboard	37.22	4 R	73.56	1 Q	61.67	2nd place, silver medalist(s)

== Wushu ==
Argentina competed in wushu.

Athlete	Event	Apparatus 1		Apparatus 2		Total	
Athlete	Event	Score	Rank	Score	Rank	Score	Rank
Melina Fiorela Arevalo	Women's changquan	8.900	6	—			
