= Track speed skating at the 2022 World Games – Men's 500 m sprint =

Men's 500 m sprint at the 2022 World Games
- Venue: Birmingham CrossPlex, Birmingham, United States
- Date: 8 July 2022
- Competitors: 13 from 13 nations

Medalists
gold medal	(Colombia) Andrés Jiménez
silver medal	(Italy) Duccio Marsili
bronze medal	(Chinese Taipei) Kuo Li-yang

The men's 500 m sprint competition in track speed skating at the 2022 World Games took place on 8 July 2022 at the Birmingham CrossPlex in Birmingham, United States.

== Competition format ==
A total of 13 athletes entered the competition. Eight fastest athletes from preliminary round advances to the semifinal. Best two athletes in each semifinal advances to the final.

== Results ==
=== Preliminary round ===
Heat 1

Rank	Name	Country	Time	Notes
1	Andrés Jiménez	Colombia	42.837	Q
2	Ricardo Verdugo	Chile	43.085	Q
3	Kuo Li-yang	Chinese Taipei	43.172	Q
4	Jose Moncada	Paraguay	44.746	
5	James Sadler	United States	45.145	

Heat 3

Rank	Name	Country	Time	Notes
1	Duccio Marsili	Italy	43.494	Q
2	Yvan Sivilier	France	43.579	Q
3	Bayron Siles	Costa Rica	43.699	Q
4	Walter Urrutia	Guatemala	45.935	

Heat 2

Rank	Name	Country	Time	Notes
1	Simon Albrecht	Germany	44.070	Q
2	Jorge Luis Martínez	Mexico	44.092	Q
3	Dhanush Babu	India	44.517	
4	Francisco Reyes	Argentina	44.813	

=== Semifinals ===
Heat 1

Rank	Name	Country	Time	Notes
1	Andrés Jiménez	Colombia	43.964	Q
2	Duccio Marsili	Italy	44.113	Q
3	Yvan Sivilier	France	44.289	
4	Jorge Luis Martínez	Mexico	44.664	

Heat 2

Rank	Name	Country	Time	Notes
1	Ricardo Verdugo	Chile	43.910	Q
2	Kuo Li-yang	Chinese Taipei	43.989	Q
3	Simon Albrecht	Germany	44.090	
4	Bayron Siles	Costa Rica	44.407	

=== Final ===
Rank	Name	Country	Time
1st place, gold medalist(s)	Andrés Jiménez	Colombia	43.256
2nd place, silver medalist(s)	Duccio Marsili	Italy	43.386
3rd place, bronze medalist(s)	Kuo Li-yang	Chinese Taipei	43.482
4	Ricardo Verdugo	Chile	43.799
