= Track speed skating at the 2022 World Games – Men's 200 m time trial =

Men's 200 m time trial at the 2022 World Games
- Venue: Birmingham CrossPlex, Birmingham, United States
- Dates: 8 July 2022
- Competitors: 13 from 13 nations
- Winning time: 17.835

Medalists
gold medal	Duccio Marsili	Italy
silver medal	Andrés Jiménez	Colombia
bronze medal	Yvan Sivilier	France

The men's 200 m time trial competition in track speed skating at the 2022 World Games took place on 8 July 2022 at the Birmingham CrossPlex in Birmingham, United States.

== Competition format ==
A total of 13 athletes entered the competition. Every athlete competed in the qualifying round, from which the top 8 advanced to the final.

== Results ==
=== Qualification ===
Rank	Athlete	Nation	Time	Notes
1	Duccio Marsili	Italy	17.890	Q
2	Andrés Jiménez	Colombia	17.977	Q
3	Ricardo Verdugo	Chile	18.013	Q
4	Yvan Sivilier	France	18.034	Q
5	Kuo Li-yang	Chinese Taipei	18.059	Q
6	Jorge Luis Martínez	Mexico	18.200	Q
7	Simon Albrecht	Germany	18.205	Q
8	Francisco Reyes	Argentina	18.416	Q
9	Dhanush Babu	India	18.464	
10	Walter Urrutia	Guatemala	18.668	
11	Jose Moncada	Paraguay	18.751	
12	Bayron Siles	Costa Rica	18.956	
13	James Sadler	United States	19.277	

=== Final ===
Rank	Athlete	Nation	Time	Notes
1st place, gold medalist(s)	Duccio Marsili	Italy	17.835	
2nd place, silver medalist(s)	Andrés Jiménez	Colombia	17.873	
3rd place, bronze medalist(s)	Yvan Sivilier	France	18.009	
4	Kuo Li-yang	Chinese Taipei	18.067	
5	Ricardo Verdugo	Chile	18.102	
6	Francisco Reyes	Argentina	18.193	
7	Simon Albrecht	Germany	18.245	
8	Jorge Luis Martínez	Mexico	18.296	
