= Track speed skating at the 2022 World Games – Women's 1000 m sprint =

Women's 1000 m sprint at the 2022 World Games
- Venue: Birmingham CrossPlex, Birmingham, United States
- Date: 9 July 2022
- Competitors: 26 from 18 nations

Medalists
gold medal	(Colombia) Johana Viveros
silver medal	(Venezuela) Angy Quintero
bronze medal	(Ecuador) Gabriela Vargas

The women's 1000 m sprint competition in track speed skating at the 2022 World Games took place on 9 July 2022 at the Birmingham CrossPlex in Birmingham, United States.

== Competition format ==
A total of 26 athletes entered the competition. Winners of each preliminary round heats and next 12 fastest athletes advances to the semifinal. Winners of each semifinal and next 6 fastest athletes advances to the final.

== Results ==
=== Preliminary round ===
Heat 1

Rank	Name	Country	Time	Notes
1	Aarathy Kasturi Raj	India	1:30.848	Q
2	Johana Viveros	Colombia	1:30.947	Q
3	Gabriela Vargas	Ecuador	1:30.997	Q
4	Rocio Berbel Alt	Argentina	1:31.104	Q
5	Solymar Vivas	Venezuela	1:32.973	
6	Jazzmyn Foster	United States	1:33.813	
	Adriana Cantillo	Cuba	DNF	

Heat 3

Rank	Name	Country	Time	Notes
1	Larissa Gaiser	Germany	1:30.741	Q
2	Dominika Gardi	Hungary	1:30.828	Q
3	Carolina Huerta	Mexico	1:31.114	Q
4	Luisa Woolaway	Italy	1:31.225	Q
5	Angelica Diaz	Guatemala	1:31.361	Q
6	María Moya	Chile	1:32.762	Q

Heat 2

Rank	Name	Country	Time	Notes
1	Valentina Letelier	Mexico	1:32.473	Q
2	Angy Quintero	Venezuela	1:32.624	Q
3	Laethisia Schimek	Germany	1:32.850	Q
4	Nerea Langa	Spain	1:33.055	
5	Kelsey Rodgers	United States	1:33.542	
6	Micaela Siri	Argentina	1:33.631	
7	Varsha Sriramakrishna Puranik	India	1:34.059	

Heat 4

Rank	Name	Country	Time	Notes
1	Alejandra Traslaviña	Chile	1:30.768	Q
2	Yang Yung-chi	Chinese Taipei	1:31.476	Q
3	Marine Lefeuvre	France	1:32.254	Q
4	Mathilde Pedronno	France	1:33.079	
5	Vanessa Wong	Hong Kong	1:33.128	
6	Karinne Tam	Hong Kong	1:37.420	

=== Semifinals ===
Heat 1

Rank	Name	Country	Time	Notes
1	Yang Yung-chi	Chinese Taipei	1:31.251	Q
2	Valentina Letelier	Mexico	1:31.402	Q
3	Marine Lefeuvre	France	1:31.469	Q
4	Laethisia Schimek	Germany	1:31.474	
5	Rocio Berbel Alt	Argentina	1:31.545	
6	Dominika Gardi	Hungary	1:31.553	
7	Carolina Huerta	Mexico	1:31.832	
8	Larissa Gaiser	Germany	1:31.929	

Heat 2

Rank	Name	Country	Time	Notes
1	Johana Viveros	Colombia	1:29.264	Q
2	Gabriela Vargas	Ecuador	1:29.369	Q
3	Alejandra Traslaviña	Chile	1:29.435	Q
4	Angy Quintero	Venezuela	1:29.779	Q
5	Angelica Diaz	Guatemala	1:30.858	Q
6	Luisa Woolaway	Italy	1:43.600	
7	María Moya	Chile	1:58.510	
	Aarathy Kasturi Raj	India	DSQ	

=== Final ===
Rank	Name	Country	Time
1st place, gold medalist(s)	Johana Viveros	Colombia	1:35.824
2nd place, silver medalist(s)	Angy Quintero	Venezuela	1:36.045
3rd place, bronze medalist(s)	Gabriela Vargas	Ecuador	1:36.839
4	Yang Yung-chi	Chinese Taipei	1:36.874
5	Valentina Letelier	Mexico	1:37.144
6	Marine Lefeuvre	France	1:37.564
7	Angelica Diaz	Guatemala	1:37.572
	Alejandra Traslaviña	Chile	DSQ
