= Bowling at the 2022 World Games – Men's doubles =

Bowling – Men's doubles at the 2022 World Games
- Venue: Birmingham–Jefferson Convention Complex, Birmingham, United States
- Dates: 9–11 July 2022
- Competitors: 32 from 16 nations

Medalists
gold medal	Denmark
silver medal	Canada
bronze medal	South Korea

The men's doubles event in bowling at the 2022 World Games took place from 9 to 11 July 2022 at the Birmingham–Jefferson Convention Complex in Birmingham, United States.

== Competition format ==
A total of 16 teams entered the competition. They competed in knock-out system.

== Results ==
=== Competition bracket ===
Round of 16; 9 July
Colombia	0
Australia	2
Puerto Rico	2
Czech Republic	1
Italy	1
Denmark	2
China	2
France	0
United States	2
Malaysia	1
Germany	0
South Korea	2
Costa Rica	0
Canada	2
South Africa	1
Kuwait	2

Quarter-finals; 9 July
Australia	1
Puerto Rico	2
Denmark	2
China	1
United States	0
South Korea	2
Canada	2
Kuwait	0

Semi-finals; 10 July
Puerto Rico	1
Denmark	2
South Korea	1
Canada	2

Final; 11 July
Denmark	2
Canada	0
Third place
Puerto Rico	1
South Korea	2
