= Water skiing at the 2022 World Games – Women's jump =

Water skiing - Women's jump at the 2022 World Games
- Venue: Oak Mountain State Park, Birmingham, United States
- Dates: 15–16 July 2022
- Competitors: 6 from 6 nations

Medalists
gold medal	Lauren Morgan	United States
silver medal	Taryn Grant	Canada
bronze medal	Valentina González	Chile

The women's jump competition in water skiing at the 2022 World Games took place from 15 to 16 July 2022 at the Oak Mountain State Park in Birmingham, United States.

== Competition format ==
A total of 6 athletes entered the competition. From preliminary round the best 5 skiers qualify to final.

== Results ==
=== Preliminary round ===
Rank	Athlete	Nation	Result	Note
1	Lauren Morgan	United States	49.8	Q
2	Taryn Grant	Canada	47.7	Q
3	Valentina González	Chile	43.6	Q
4	Aaliyah Yoong Hanifah	Malaysia	41.9	Q
5	Stanislava Prosvietova	Ukraine	37.0	Q
6	Alice Bagnoli	Italy	34.2	

=== Final ===
Rank	Athlete	Nation	Result
1st place, gold medalist(s)	Lauren Morgan	United States	52.7
2nd place, silver medalist(s)	Taryn Grant	Canada	50.1
3rd place, bronze medalist(s)	Valentina González	Chile	46.6
4	Stanislava Prosvietova	Ukraine	43.0
5	Aaliyah Yoong Hanifah	Malaysia	41.6
