= Track speed skating at the 2022 World Games – Women's 200 m time trial =

200 metre speed skating event

Women's 200 m time trial at the 2022 World Games
- Venue: Birmingham CrossPlex, Birmingham, United States
- Dates: 8 July 2022
- Competitors: 14 from 14 nations
- Winning time: 18.894

Medalists
gold medal	Geiny Pájaro	Colombia
silver medal	Asja Varani	Italy
bronze medal	Chen Ying-chu	Chinese Taipei

The women's 200 m time trial competition in track speed skating at the 2022 World Games took place on 8 July 2022 at the Birmingham CrossPlex in Birmingham, United States.

== Competition format ==
A total of 15 athletes entered the competition. Every athlete competed in the qualifying round, from which the top 8 advanced to the final.

== Results ==
=== Qualification ===
Rank	Athlete	Nation	Time	Notes
1	Geiny Pájaro	Colombia	18.926	Q
2	Asja Varani	Italy	18.930	Q
3	Chen Ying-chu	Chinese Taipei	19.188	Q
4	Mathilde Pédronno	France	19.373	Q
5	María Moya	Chile	19.435	Q
6	Laethisia Schimek	Germany	19.643	Q
7	Idalis de León	Guatemala	19.651	Q
8	Nerea Langa	Spain	19.678	Q
9	Carolina Huerta	Mexico	19.883	
10	Solymar Vivas	Venezuela	20.000	
11	Jazzmyn Foster	United States	20.229	
12	Varsha Sriramakrishna Puranik	India	20.472	
13	Micaela Siri	Argentina	20.515	
14	Karinne Tam	Hong Kong	20.813	
	Adriana Cantillo	Cuba	Did not start	

=== Final ===
Rank	Athlete	Nation	Time	Notes
1st place, gold medalist(s)	Geiny Pájaro	Colombia	18.894	
2nd place, silver medalist(s)	Asja Varani	Italy	19.020	
3rd place, bronze medalist(s)	Chen Ying-chu	Chinese Taipei	19.053	
4	María Moya	Chile	19.309	
5	Mathilde Pédronno	France	19.351	
6	Nerea Langa	Spain	19.601	
7	Idalis de León	Guatemala	19.661	
8	Laethisia Schimek	Germany	19.750	
