= Racquetball at the 2022 World Games – Men's singles =

Racquetball – Men's singles at the 2022 World Games
- Venue: University of Alabama Birmingham, Birmingham, United States
- Dates: 10–13 July
- Competitors: 16 from 11 nations

Medalists
gold medal	Andrés Acuña	Costa Rica
silver medal	Rodrigo Montoya	Mexico
bronze medal	Andree Parrilla	Mexico

The men's singles event in racquetball at the 2022 World Games took place from 10 to 13 July 2022 at the University of Alabama Birmingham in Birmingham, United States.

Andrés Acuña of Costa Rica won the competition, defeating Mexican Rodrigo Montoya in the final.

== Competition format ==
A total of 16 athletes entered the competition. They competed in knock-out system.

== Results ==
Round of 16
1	A Landa (USA)	15	15	15
16	E Tynan (IRL)	8	9	4
9	D García (ARG)	14	14	15	8
8	R Montoya (MEX)	15	15	12	15
5	A Parrilla (MEX)	15	15	15
12	R de León (DOM)	6	7	13
13	L Connell (CAN)	14	5	12
4	J Bredenbeck (USA)	15	15	15
3	M Mercado (COL)	15	15	15
14	K Cottrell (IRL)	2	7	7
11	J Cueva (ECU)	11	13	9
6	J Ugalde (ECU)	15	15	15
7	J Salvatierra (GUA)	15	15	15
10	F Camacho (CRC)	14	14	13
15	Lee G-h (KOR)	7	4	6
2	A Acuña (CRC)	15	15	15

Quarter-finals
1	A Landa (USA)	7	8	15	10
8	R Montoya (MEX)	15	15	11	15
5	A Parrilla (MEX)	15	15	15
4	J Bredenbeck (USA)	8	12	10
3	M Mercado (COL)	15	15	15
6	J Ugalde (ECU)	5	14	8
7	J Salvatierra (GUA)	13	14	5
2	A Acuña (CRC)	15	15	15

Semi-finals
8	R Montoya (MEX)	15	15	11	15
5	A Parrilla (MEX)	9	14	15	9
3	M Mercado (COL)	15	13	10	10
2	A Acuña (CRC)	14	15	15	15

Final
8	R Montoya (MEX)	12	13	14
2	A Acuña (CRC)	15	15	15
Third place
5	A Parrilla (MEX)	15	15	15
3	M Mercado (COL)	13	10	11

== See also ==
- Racquetball at the 2022 World Games - Women's singles
