= Bowling at the 2022 World Games – Women's doubles =

Bowling – Women's doubles at the 2022 World Games
- Venue: Birmingham–Jefferson Convention Complex, Birmingham, United States
- Dates: 9–11 July 2022
- Competitors: 32 from 16 nations

Medalists
gold medal	Denmark
silver medal	United States
bronze medal	Malaysia

The women's doubles event in bowling at the 2022 World Games took place from 9 to 11 July 2022 at the Birmingham–Jefferson Convention Complex in Birmingham, United States.

== Competition format ==
A total of 16 teams entered the competition. They competed in knock-out system.

== Results ==
=== Competition bracket ===
Round of 16; 9 July
Sweden	0
United States	2
Aruba	0
Australia	2
South Africa	0
Mexico	2
Colombia	2
Chinese Taipei	0
France	1
Netherlands	2
Malaysia	2
Puerto Rico	0
South Korea	2
Singapore	0
Germany	0
Denmark	2

Quarter-finals; 9 July
United States	2
Australia	0
Mexico	0
Colombia	2
Netherlands	0
Malaysia	2
South Korea	0
Denmark	2

Semi-finals; 10 July
United States	2
Colombia	1
Malaysia	0
Denmark	2

Final; 11 July
United States	1
Denmark	2
Third place
Colombia	0
Malaysia	2
