= Malaysia at the 2022 World Games =

- IOC code: MAS
- NOC: Olympic Council of Malaysia
- Website: www.olympic.org.my (in English)

in Birmingham, United States
- Competitors: 5 in 2 sports
- Medals Ranked 69th: Gold 0 Silver 0 Bronze 2 Total 2

World Games appearances (overview)
- 1981; 1985; 1989; 1993; 1997; 2001; 2005; 2009; 2013; 2017; 2022; 2025

Malaysia participate in the 2022 World Games in Birmingham, United States, from 7 to 17 July 2022. The games were originally scheduled for July 2021, but were postponed due to the rescheduling of the Tokyo 2020 Olympic Games. Athletes representing Malaysia won two bronze medals and the country finished in 69th place in the medal table.

== Medalists ==
Medal	Name	Sport	Event	Date
Bronze	Natasha Mohamed Roslan; Sin Li Jane	Bowling	Women's doubles	July 11
Bronze	Aaliyah Yoong Hanifah	Water skiing	Women's tricks	July 15

== Competitors ==
The following is the list of number of competitors in the Games.

Sport	Men	Women	Total
Bowling	2	2	4
Water skiing	0	1	1
Total	2	3	5

== Bowling ==
Malaysia won one bronze medal in bowling.

Men

Athlete	Event	Round of 32	Round of 16	Quarterfinals	Semifinals	Final / BM	
Athlete	Event	Opposition Score	Opposition Score	Opposition Score	Opposition Score	Opposition Score	Rank
Muhammad Rafiq Ismail	Singles	Callum Borck (AUS); W 2–0	Kim Dong-hyeon (KOR); W 2–0	Graham Fach (CAN); L 1–2	Did not advance		
Tan Chye Chern	Singles	Jivi Sewchuran (RSA); W 2–1	Andrés Gómez (COL); W 2–0	Damen Alexander (CAN); L 1–2	Did not advance		
Muhammad Rafiq Ismail; Tan Chye Chern	Doubles	—	Alec Kiplinger / Trent Mitchell (USA); L 1–2	Did not advance			

Women

Athlete	Event	Round of 32	Round of 16	Quarterfinals	Semifinals	Final / BM	
Athlete	Event	Opposition Score	Opposition Score	Opposition Score	Opposition Score	Opposition Score	Rank
Natasha Mohamed Roslan	Singles	Talshaye Naranjo (PUR); L 1–2	Did not advance				
Sin Li Jane	Singles	Kim Hyun-mi (KOR); W 2–1	Clara Guerrero (COL); L 0–2	Did not advance			
Natasha Mohamed Roslan; Sin Li Jane	Doubles	—	Talshaye Naranjo / Pamela Perez (PUR); W 2–0	Samantha Grenier/ Denise Blankenzee (NED); W 2–0	Mika Guldbaek / Mai Ginge Jensen (DEN); L 0–2	Juliana Franco / Clara Guerrero (COL); W 2–0	3rd place, bronze medalist(s)

== Water skiing ==
Malaysia competed in water skiing.

Athlete	Event	Preliminary round		Final	
Athlete	Event	Result	Rank	Result	Rank
Aaliyah Yoong Hanifah	Women's tricks	6700	4 Q	7960	3rd place, bronze medalist(s)
Aaliyah Yoong Hanifah	Women's jump	41.9	4 Q	41.6	5
