= Racquetball at the 2022 World Games – Women's singles =

Racquetball – Women's singles at the 2022 World Games
- Venue: University of Alabama Birmingham, Birmingham, United States
- Dates: 10–13 July
- Competitors: 16 from 11 nations

Medalists
gold medal	Paola Longoria	Mexico
silver medal	Ana Gabriela Martínez	Guatemala
bronze medal	Angélica Barrios	Bolivia

The women's singles event in racquetball at the 2022 World Games took place from 10 to 13 July 2022 at the University of Alabama Birmingham in Birmingham, United States.

Mexican Paola Longoria won the competition, defeating Guatemalan Gabriela Martinez in the final.

== Competition format ==
A total of 16 athletes entered the competition. They competed in knock-out system.

== Results ==
Round of 16
1	P Longoria (MEX)	15	15	15
16	A Hanashi (JPN)	1	5	6
9	C Muñoz (CHI)	14	15	15	15
8	M Rodríguez (GUA)	15	7	8	13
5	A Barrios (BOL)	15	15	15
12	M Meneses (BOL)	9	13	11
13	Lee S-m (KOR)	8	4	2
4	N Méndez (ARG)	15	15	15
3	R Rajsich (USA)	15	15	15
14	A Hickey (IRL)	1	2	7
11	M Morissette (CAN)	6	8	4
6	AG Martínez (GUA)	15	15	15
7	S Salas (MEX)	15	15	15
10	C Amaya (COL)	9	14	11
15	M Haverty (IRL)	0	8	3
2	K Lawrence (USA)	15	15	15

Quarterfinals
1	P Longoria (MEX)	15	15	15
9	C Muñoz (CHI)	11	5	4
5	A Barrios (BOL)	15	7	15	15
4	N Méndez (ARG)	9	15	14	9
3	R Rajsich (USA)	8	9	8
6	AG Martínez (GUA)	15	15	15
7	S Salas (MEX)	15	13	10	15	11
2	K Lawrence (USA)	14	15	15	6	9

Semifinals
1	P Longoria (MEX)	15	15	15
5	A Barrios (BOL)	12	12	9
6	AG Martínez (GUA)	12	15	15	15
7	S Salas (MEX)	15	5	11	7

Final
1	P Longoria (MEX)	15	9	15	15
6	AG Martínez (GUA)	2	15	8	9
Third place
5	A Barrios (BOL)	15	15	9	15
7	S Salas (MEX)	4	12	15	12

== See also ==
- Racquetball at the 2022 World Games - Men's singles
