= Fistball at the 2022 World Games – Men's tournament =

Men's fistball at the 2022 World Games
- Venue: Berylson Soccer Park
- Location: Birmingham, United States
- Dates: 10–14 July
- Teams: 8

The men's fistball tournament at the 2022 World Games was held from 10 to 14 July at the Berylson Soccer Park in Birmingham, Alabama, United States.

== Group stage ==
All times are local (GMT–5).

=== Group A ===
Pos	Team	Pld	W	L	SF	SA	SD	Pts	Qualification
1	Germany	3	3	0	9	0	+9	6	Semifinals
2	Switzerland	3	2	1	6	3	+3	4	Semifinals
3	Chile	3	1	2	3	6	−3	2	Fifth place game
4	Argentina	3	0	3	0	9	−9	0	Seventh place game

Source: Birmingham 2022

10 July 2022; 12:45	Germany	3–0	Chile	Birmingham Southern College, Birmingham
10 July 2022; 12:45	(11–9, 11–7, 11–5); Results			Birmingham Southern College, Birmingham

10 July 2022; 18:15	Switzerland	3–0	Argentina	Birmingham Southern College, Birmingham
10 July 2022; 18:15	(12–10, 11–6, 11–7); Results			Birmingham Southern College, Birmingham

11 July 2022; 10:00	Chile	3–0	Argentina	Birmingham Southern College, Birmingham
11 July 2022; 10:00	(11–9, 11–9, 11–3); Results			Birmingham Southern College, Birmingham

11 July 2022; 11:15	Germany	3–0	Switzerland	Birmingham Southern College, Birmingham
11 July 2022; 11:15	(15-13, 11–4, 11–6); Results			Birmingham Southern College, Birmingham

12 July 2022; 15:15	Switzerland	3–0	Chile	Birmingham Southern College, Birmingham
12 July 2022; 15:15	(11–6, 11–5, 11–8); Results			Birmingham Southern College, Birmingham

12 July 2022; 17:45	Germany	3–0	Argentina	Birmingham Southern College, Birmingham
12 July 2022; 17:45	(11–5, 11–1, 11–1); Results			Birmingham Southern College, Birmingham

=== Group B ===
Pos	Team	Pld	W	L	SF	SA	SD	Pts	Qualification
1	Brazil	3	3	0	9	2	+7	6	Semifinals
2	Austria	3	2	1	6	3	+3	4	Semifinals
3	Italy	3	1	2	4	6	−2	2	Fifth place game
4	United States (H)	3	0	3	1	9	−8	0	Seventh place game

Source: Birmingham 2022
(H) Hosts

10 July 2022; 14:00	Austria	3–0	Italy	Birmingham Southern College, Birmingham
10 July 2022; 14:00	(11–5, 11–7, 11–7); Results			Birmingham Southern College, Birmingham

10 July 2022; 19:30	Brazil	3–1	United States	Birmingham Southern College, Birmingham
10 July 2022; 19:30	(11–6, 9–11, 11–8, 11–5); Results			Birmingham Southern College, Birmingham

11 July 2022; 12:30	Italy	3–0	United States	Birmingham Southern College, Birmingham
11 July 2022; 12:30	(11–7, 11–7, 11–9); Results			Birmingham Southern College, Birmingham

11 July 2022; 17:00	Austria	0–3	Brazil	Birmingham Southern College, Birmingham
11 July 2022; 17:00	(6–11, 10–12, 6–11); Results			Birmingham Southern College, Birmingham

12 July 2022; 16:30	Brazil	3–1	Italy	Birmingham Southern College, Birmingham
12 July 2022; 16:30	(9–11, 11–5, 11–6, 11–5); Results			Birmingham Southern College, Birmingham

12 July 2022; 19:00	Austria	3–0	United States	Birmingham Southern College, Birmingham
12 July 2022; 19:00	(11–3, 11–7, 13–11); Results			Birmingham Southern College, Birmingham

== Knockout stage ==
=== Bracket ===
Semifinals
13 July
Brazil	2
Switzerland	3
13 July
Germany	3
Austria	1

Gold medal
14 July
Switzerland	1
Germany	4
Bronze medal
14 July
Brazil	3
Austria	2

=== Semifinals ===
13 July 2022; 9:15	Brazil	2–3	Switzerland	Birmingham Southern College, Birmingham
13 July 2022; 9:15	(11–13, 11–8, 11–6, 9–11, 7–11); Results			Birmingham Southern College, Birmingham

13 July 2022; 10:30	Germany	3–1	Austria	Birmingham Southern College, Birmingham
13 July 2022; 10:30	(11–7, 11–13, 11–5, 11–9); Results			Birmingham Southern College, Birmingham

=== Seventh place game ===
13 July 2022; 8:00	Argentina	3–0	United States	Birmingham Southern College, Birmingham
13 July 2022; 8:00	(13–11, 11–9, 11–8); Results			Birmingham Southern College, Birmingham

=== Fifth place game ===
14 July 2022; 9:00	Chile	0–3	Italy	Birmingham Southern College, Birmingham
14 July 2022; 9:00	(6–11, 6–11, 6–11); Results			Birmingham Southern College, Birmingham

=== Bronze medal game ===
14 July 2022; 10:30	Brazil	3–2	Austria	Birmingham Southern College, Birmingham
14 July 2022; 10:30	(11–8, 14–15, 11–9, 9–11, 11–8); Results			Birmingham Southern College, Birmingham

=== Gold medal game ===
14 July 2022; 14:00	Switzerland	1–4	Germany	Birmingham Southern College, Birmingham
14 July 2022; 14:00	(5–11, 11–4, 14–15, 8–11, 6–11); Results			Birmingham Southern College, Birmingham

== Final standings ==
Rank	Team
1st place, gold medalist(s)	Germany
2nd place, silver medalist(s)	Switzerland
3rd place, bronze medalist(s)	Brazil
4	Austria
5	Italy
6	Chile
7	Argentina
8	United States
