= Water skiing at the 2022 World Games – Women's tricks =

Water skiing - Women's Tricks at the 2022 World Games
- Venue: Oak Mountain State Park, Birmingham, United States
- Dates: 14–15 July 2022
- Competitors: 7 from 7 nations

Medalists
gold medal	Neilly Ross	Canada
silver medal	Anna Gay	United States
bronze medal	Aaliyah Yoong Hanifah	Malaysia

The women's tricks competition in water skiing at the 2022 World Games took place from 14 to 15 July 2022 at the Oak Mountain State Park in Birmingham, United States.

== Competition format ==
A total of 7 athletes entered the competition. From preliminary round the best 5 skiers qualify to final.

== Results ==
=== Preliminary round ===
Rank	Athlete	Nation	Result	Note
1	Neilly Ross	Canada	9750	Q
2	Anna Gay	United States	9190	Q
3	Daniela Verswyvel	Colombia	7100	Q
4	Aaliyah Yoong Hanifah	Malaysia	6700	Q
5	Taylah Simmonds	Australia	6640	Q
6	Alice Bagnoli	Italy	5550	
7	Valentina Gonzalez	Chile	5500	

=== Final ===
Rank	Athlete	Nation	Result
1st place, gold medalist(s)	Neilly Ross	Canada	9690
2nd place, silver medalist(s)	Anna Gay	United States	9190
3rd place, bronze medalist(s)	Aaliyah Yoong Hanifah	Malaysia	7960
4	Daniela Verswyvel	Colombia	6380
5	Taylah Simmonds	Australia	6360
