= Finswimming at the 2022 World Games – Women's 50 m apnoea =

Finswimming – Women's Apnoea 50 m at the 2022 World Games
- Venue: Birmingham CrossPlex, Birmingham, United States
- Dates: 8 July 2022
- Competitors: 8 from 5 nations

Medalists
| gold medal | (China) Hu Yaoyao |
| silver medal | (China) Shu Chengjing |
| bronze medal | (Colombia) Paula Aguirre |

The women's apnoea 50 m event in finswimming at the 2022 World Games took place on 8 July 2022 at the Birmingham CrossPlex in Birmingham, United States.

== Competition format ==
A total of 8 athletes entered the competition. Only final was held.

== Results ==
=== Final ===
| Rank | Athlete | Nation | Time |
|---|---|---|---|
| 1st place, gold medalist(s) | Hu Yaoyao | China | 15.75 |
| 2nd place, silver medalist(s) | Shu Chengjing | China | 15.90 |
| 3rd place, bronze medalist(s) | Paula Aguirre | Colombia | 16.27 |
| 4 | Seo Ui-jin | South Korea | 16.29 |
| 5 | Maiwenn Hamon | France | 16.53 |
| 6 | Dora Bassi | Croatia | 16.54 |
| 7 | Maelle Lecoeur | France | 16.76 |
| 8 | Jang Ye-sol | South Korea | 17.43 |
