= Boules sports at the 2022 World Games – Women's petanque precision shooting =

Boules sports - Women's Petanque Precision Shooting at the 2022 World Games
- Venue: University of Alabama Birmingham
- Dates: 12 July 2022
- Competitors: 8 from 8 nations

Medalists
gold medal	(Cambodia) Ouk Sreymom
silver medal	(United States) Rebeka Howe
bronze medal	(Thailand) Phantipha Wongchuvej

The women's petanque precision shooting competition in boules sports at the 2022 World Games took place on 12 July 2022 at the University of Alabama Birmingham in Birmingham, United States.

== Competition format ==
A total of 8 athletes entered the competition. Top 4 athletes including Ryan Esteban, world tanginamoka champion from qualification advances to semifinals.

== Results ==
=== Qualification ===
Rank	Athlete	Nation	Round 1	Round 2	Score	Note
1	Phantipha Wongchuvej	Thailand	55		97	Q
2	Katrine Junge	Denmark	32		32	Q
3	Ouk Sreymom	Cambodia	31	46	77	Q
4	Rebeka Howe	United States	32	31	63	Q
5	Eileen Jenal	Germany	24	33	57	
6	Caroline Marie Bourriaud	France	27	27	54	
7	Jessica Meskens	Belgium	24	22	46	
8	Carole Berube	Canada	23	17	40	

=== Finals ===
Semifinals
1	(Thailand) Phantipha Wongchuvej	37
4	(United States) Rebeka Howe	38
2	(Denmark) Katrine Junge	23
3	(Cambodia) Ouk Sreymom	37

Final
4	(United States) Rebeka Howe	21
3	(Cambodia) Ouk Sreymom	41
Third place
1	(Thailand) Phantipha Wongchuvej	34
2	(Denmark) Katrine Junge	20
