= Finswimming at the 2022 World Games – Women's 50 m bi-fins =

Women's 50 metre bi-fins at the 2022 World Games
- Venue: Birmingham CrossPlex, Birmingham
- Date: 8 July
- Competitors: 8 from 6 nations
- Winning time: 20.54

Medalists
1st place, gold medalist(s)		Petra Senánszky	Hungary
2nd place, silver medalist(s)		Choi Min-ji	South Korea
3rd place, bronze medalist(s)		Krisztina Varga	Hungary

The women's bi-fins 50 m event in finswimming at the 2022 World Games took place on 8 July 2022 at the Birmingham CrossPlex in Birmingham, United States.

== Competition format ==
A total of 8 athletes entered the competition. Only final was held.

== Results ==
=== Final ===
Rank	Athlete	Nation	Time
1st place, gold medalist(s)	Petra Senánszky	Hungary	20.54
2nd place, silver medalist(s)	Choi Min-ji	South Korea	21.59
3rd place, bronze medalist(s)	Krisztina Varga	Hungary	21.64
4	Antonina Dudek	Poland	22.06
5	He Pin-li	Chinese Taipei	22.07
6	Iryna Pikiner	Ukraine	22.11
7	Yevheniia Tymoshenko	Ukraine	22.50
8	Diana Moreno	Colombia	22.82
