= Racquetball at the 2022 World Games =

- Venue: University of Alabama Birmingham
- Dates: 10–13 July
- No. of events: 2
- Competitors: 32 from 14 nations

The racquetball competition at the 2022 World Games took place from July 10 to 13 in Birmingham, Alabama in the United States at the University of Alabama Birmingham. Originally scheduled to take place in July 2021, the Games were rescheduled for July 2022 as a result of the 2020 Summer Olympics postponement due to the COVID-19 pandemic. Racquetball returns to The World Games programme after nine years of absence.

== Schedule ==
All times are Alabama Time (UTC-5)

P	Preliminaries	¼	Quarterfinals	½	Semifinals	B	Bronze medal match	F	Final

Date →	Sun 10		Mon 11		Tue 12		Wed 13	
Event ↓	M	A	M	A	M	A	M	A
Men's singles	P		P		¼		½	B & F
Women's singles	P		P		¼		½	B & F

M = Morning session, A = Afternoon session

== Qualification ==
Sixteen men and sixteen women qualified for the 2022 World Games at the 2021 World Championships in Guatemala City, Guatemala.

== Participating nations ==
- Argentina (2)
- Bolivia (2)
- Canada (2)
- Chile (1)
- Colombia (2)
- Costa Rica (2)
- Dominican Republic (1)
- Ecuador (2)
- Guatemala (3)
- Ireland (4)
- Japan (1)
- Mexico (4)
- South Korea (2)
- United States (4)

== Medal table ==
Rank	Nation	Gold	Silver	Bronze	Total
1	Mexico	1	1	1	3
2	Costa Rica	1	0	0	1
3	Guatemala	0	1	0	1
4	Bolivia	0	0	1	1
Totals (4 entries)		2	2	2	6

== Events ==
Event	Gold	Silver	Bronze
Men's singles	Andrés Acuña; Costa Rica	Rodrigo Montoya; Mexico	Andree Parrilla; Mexico
Women's singles	Paola Longoria; Mexico	Ana Gabriela Martinez; Guatemala	Angélica Barrios; Bolivia
