= Aruba at the 2022 World Games =

- IOC code: ARU
- NOC: Aruban Olympic Committee

in Birmingham, United States 7 July 2022 – 17 July 2022
- Competitors: 2 (2 women) in 1 sport
- Medals: Gold 0 Silver 0 Bronze 0 Total 0

World Games appearances
- 1981; 1985; 1989; 1993; 1997; 2001; 2005; 2009; 2013; 2017; 2022; 2025

Aruba competed at the 2022 World Games in Birmingham, Alabama, United States from 7 July to 17 July 2022.

== Competitors ==
Two athletes from Aruba qualified for the Games.

Sport	Men	Women	Total
Bowling	0	2	2
Total	0	2	2

== Bowling ==
Both of Aruba's athletes competed in bowling.

Athlete	Event	Round of 32	Round of 16	Quarterfinal	Semifinal	Final / BM	
Athlete	Event	Opposition Result	Opposition Result	Opposition Result	Opposition Result	Opposition Result	Rank
Kamilia Dammers	Women's singles	Bond (USA); W 182–176, 214–182	Tan (SGP); L 177–246, 161–216	did not advance			
Eva Maduro	Women's singles	Franco (COL); L 148–203, 167–213	did not advance				
Kamilah Dammers; Eva Maduro	Women's doubles	—N/a	Commane/Martin (AUS); L 155–185, 190–191	did not advance			
