= Artistic roller skating at the 2022 World Games – Couple dance =

Artistic roller skating – men's singles at the 2022 World Games
- Venue: Birmingham CrossPlex, Birmingham, United States
- Dates: 16–17 July 2022
- Competitors: 8 from 4 nations

Medalists
gold medal	(Portugal) Ana Luisa Monteiro; Pedro Monteiro
silver medal	(Italy) Asya Sofia Testoni; Giovanni Piccolantonio
bronze medal	(Colombia) Brayan Carreño; Daniela Gerena

The couple dance competition in artistic roller skating at the 2022 World Games took place from 16 to 17 July 2022 at the Birmingham CrossPlex in Birmingham, United States.

== Competition format ==
A total of 4 couples (4 men & 4 women) entered the competition. Short program and long program were held.

== Results ==
Rank	Skater	Nation	Style dance	Free dance	Total
1st place, gold medalist(s)	Ana Luisa Monteiro; Pedro Monteiro	Portugal	55.2	0 83.54	138.76
2nd place, silver medalist(s)	Asya Sofia Testoni; Giovanni Piccolantonio	Italy	54.18	84.55	138.73
3rd place, bronze medalist(s)	Brayan Carreño; Daniela Gerena	Colombia	46.30	60.38	106.68
4	Madison Marie Kellis; Raphael Amador	United States	38.40	54.02	92.42
