= Cambodia at the 2025 World Games =

- IOC code: CAM
- NOC: National Olympic Committee of Cambodia

in Chengdu, China 7 August 2025 – 17 August 2025
- Competitors: 15 (9 men and 6 women) in 3 sports and 8 events
- Medals: Gold 0 Silver 0 Bronze 0 Total 0

World Games appearances
- 1981; 1985; 1989; 1993; 1997; 2001; 2005; 2009; 2013; 2017; 2022; 2025

Cambodia competed at the 2025 World Games held in Chengdu, China from 7 to 17 August 2025.

== Competitors ==
The following is the list of number of competitors in the Games.

Sport	Men	Women	Total
Canoe dragon boat	6	6	12
Ju-jitsu	2	0	2
Triathlon	1	0	1
Total	9	6	15

== Dragon boat ==
Team	Event	Heat		Semifinal		Final	
Team	Event	Result	Rank	Result	Rank	Result	Rank
Thailand	Open 8-seater 200m	52.64	2 F	Bye		51.05	6
Thailand	Open 8-seater 500m	2:23.73	6	—N/a			
Thailand	Open 8-seater 2000m	—N/a				9:41.58	10
Thailand	Mixed 10-seater 200m	53.19	5 SF	52.68	5	—N/a	
Thailand	Mixed 10-seater 500m	2:35.05	6	—N/a			
Thailand	Mixed 10-seater 2000m	—N/a				DSQ	—

== Ju-jitsu ==
Mixed

Athlete	Event	Qualification round				Final			Rank
Athlete	Event	Technique	Show	Total	Rank	Technique	Show	Total	Rank
Pikada Touch; Mithora Kongmona	Mixed Duo Show Open	19.5	19.0	38.5	7	—N/a			
