= Water skiing at the 2022 World Games =

- Venue: Oak Mountain State Park
- Dates: 14–16 July 2022
- No. of events: 8
- Competitors: 73 from 35 nations

The water skiing and wakeboarding competition at the 2022 World Games took place in July 2022, in Birmingham, Alabama in United States, at the Oak Mountain State Park. Originally scheduled to take place in July 2021, the Games were rescheduled for July 2022 as a result of the 2020 Summer Olympics postponement due to the COVID-19 pandemic.

== Participating nations ==
- Argentina (2)
- Australia (5)
- Austria (1)
- Belgium (1)
- Brazil (1)
- Canada (4)
- Chile (3)
- Chinese Taipei (1)
- Colombia (4)
- Czech Republic (2)
- Denmark (1)
- Dominican Republic (1)
- France (2)
- Germany (3)
- Great Britain (3)
- Greece (1)
- Ireland (1)
- Israel (1)
- Italy (6)
- Japan (2)
- Latvia (1)
- Malaysia (1)
- Mexico (3)
- Morocco (1)
- Namibia (1)
- New Zealand (1)
- Slovakia (1)
- South Africa (1)
- South Korea (1)
- Spain (2)
- Sweden (1)
- Switzerland (1)
- Thailand (1)
- Ukraine (3)
- United States (9)

== Medal table ==
* Host nation (United States)

Rank	Nation	Gold	Silver	Bronze	Total
1	United States*	4	2	1	7
2	Canada	1	2	1	4
3	Ukraine	1	1	0	2
4	Australia	1	0	0	1
4	Japan	1	0	0	1
6	Italy	0	2	0	2
7	Argentina	0	1	1	2
8	France	0	0	2	2
9	Chile	0	0	1	1
9	Germany	0	0	1	1
9	Malaysia	0	0	1	1
Totals (11 entries)		8	8	8	24

== Events ==
=== Men ===
Event	Gold	Silver	Bronze
Tricks	Adam Pickos; United States	Danylo Filchenko; Ukraine	Pierre Ballon; France
Slalom	Nate Smith; United States	Brando Caruso; Italy	Cole McCormick; Canada
Jump	Danylo Filchenko; Ukraine	Taylor Garcia; United States	Tobías Giorgis; Argentina
Wakeboard	Nic Rapa; Australia	Stefano Comollo; Italy	Maxime Roux; France

=== Women ===
Event	Gold	Silver	Bronze
Tricks	Neilly Ross; Canada	Anna Gay; United States	Aaliyah Yoong Hanifah; Malaysia
Slalom	Regina Jaquess; United States	Jaimee Bull; Canada	Geena Krueger; Germany
Jump	Lauren Morgan; United States	Taryn Grant; Canada	Valentina González; Chile
Wakeboard	Hinata Yoshihara; Japan	Eugenia De Armas; Argentina	Taylor McCullough; United States
