= Bolivia at the 2022 World Games =

- IOC code: BOL
- NOC: Bolivian Olympic Committee

in Birmingham, United States 7 July 2022 – 17 July 2022
- Competitors: 2 (2 women) in 1 sport and 1 event
- Medals Ranked 70th: Gold 0 Silver 0 Bronze 1 Total 1

World Games appearances
- 1981; 1985; 1989; 1993; 1997; 2001; 2005; 2009; 2013; 2017; 2022; 2025

Bolivia competed at the 2022 World Games held in Birmingham, United States from 7 to 17 July, 2022. Athletes representing Bolivia won one bronze medal and the country finished in 70th place in the medal table.

== Medalists ==
Medal	Name	Sport	Event	Date
Bronze	Angélica Barrios	Racquetball	Women's singles	13 July

== Competitors ==
The following is the list of number of competitors in the Games.

Sport	Men	Women	Total
Racquetball	0	2	2
Total	0	2	2

== Racquetball ==
Bolivia won one bronze medal in racquetball.

Athlete	Event	Round of 16	Quarterfinal	Semifinal	Final / BM	
Athlete	Event	Opposition Result	Opposition Result	Opposition Result	Opposition Result	Rank
Angélica Barrios	Women's singles	Meneses (BOL); W 15–9, 15–13, 15–11	Méndez (ARG); W 15–9, 7–15, 15–14, 15–9	Longoria (MEX); L 12–15, 12–15, 9–15	Salas (MEX); W 15–4, 15–12, 9–15, 15–12	3rd place, bronze medalist(s)
Micaela Meneses	Women's singles	Barrios (BOL); L 9–15, 13–15, 11–15	did not advance			=9
