= Finswimming at the 2022 World Games – Men's 400 m surface =

Finswimming – Men's 400 m surface at the 2022 World Games
- Venue: Birmingham CrossPlex, Birmingham, United States
- Dates: 8 July 2022
- Competitors: 8 from 7 nations

Medalists
gold medal	(Hungary) Alex Mozsár
silver medal	(South Korea) Yoon Young-joong
bronze medal	(Hungary) Ádám Bukor

The men's 400 m surface event in finswimming at the 2022 World Games took place on 8 July 2022 at the Birmingham CrossPlex in Birmingham, United States.

== Competition format ==
A total of 8 athletes entered the competition. Only final was held.

== Results ==
=== Final ===
Rank	Athlete	Nation	Time
1st place, gold medalist(s)	Alex Mozsár	Hungary	2:56.87 WG
2nd place, silver medalist(s)	Yoon Young-joong	South Korea	2:57.76
3rd place, bronze medalist(s)	Ádám Bukor	Hungary	2:57.83
4	Hugo Meyer	France	2:58.13
5	Oleksii Zakharov	Ukraine	2:58.31
6	Robert Golenia	Germany	3:03.09
7	Derin Toparlak	Turkey	3:03.14
8	Antonios Tsourounakis	Greece	3:06.57
