= Bowling at the 2022 World Games =

- Venue: Birmingham–Jefferson Convention Complex
- Dates: July 8–11, 2022
- No. of events: 4

The bowling competition at the 2022 World Games took place July 8–11, 2022, in Birmingham in United States, at the Birmingham–Jefferson Convention Complex. Originally scheduled to take place in July 2021, the Games have been rescheduled for July 2022 as a result of the 2020 Summer Olympics postponement due to the COVID-19 pandemic.

== Participating nations ==
- Aruba (2)
- Canada (2)
- China (2)
- Chinese Taipei (2)
- Colombia (4)
- Costa Rica (2)
- Czech Republic (2)
- Denmark (2)
- Finland (2)
- France (2)
- Germany (4)
- Italy (2)
- Kuwait (2)
- Malaysia (4)
- Mexico (2)
- Netherlands (2)
- Puerto Rico (4)
- Russia (2)
- Singapore (2)
- South Korea (4)
- Sweden (2)
- United States (4)

== Medal table ==
* Host nation (United States)

Rank	Nation	Gold	Silver	Bronze	Total
1	Denmark	2	0	0	2
2	United States*	1	1	0	2
3	Australia	1	0	0	1
4	Canada	0	1	1	2
5	Colombia	0	1	0	1
5	Czech Republic	0	1	0	1
7	Malaysia	0	0	1	1
7	South Korea	0	0	1	1
7	Sweden	0	0	1	1
Totals (9 entries)		4	4	4	12

== Events ==
=== Men ===
Event	Gold	Silver	Bronze
Singles	Sam Cooley; Australia	Jaroslav Lorenc; Czech Republic	Graham Fach; Canada
Doubles	Denmark; Jesper Agerbo; Dan Östergaard-Poulsen	Canada; Graham Fach; Darren Alexander	South Korea; Kim Dong-hyeon; Park Dong-hyun

=== Women ===
Event	Gold	Silver	Bronze
Singles	Shannon O'Keefe; United States	Clara Guerrero; Colombia	Jenny Wegner; Sweden
Doubles	Denmark; Mika Guldbaek; Mai Ginge Jensen	United States; Shannon O'Keefe; Julia Bond	Malaysia; Li Jane Sin; Natasha Mohamed Roslan
