= Boules sports at the 2022 World Games =

- Venue: University of Alabama Birmingham
- Dates: 12–13 July 2022

The boules sports competition at the 2022 World Games took place in July 2022, in Birmingham in the United States, at Bessie Estelle Park, next to the University of Alabama Birmingham's PNC Field. Originally scheduled to take place in July 2021, the Games were rescheduled for July 2022 as a result of the 2020 Summer Olympics postponement due to the COVID-19 pandemic. This was the first time that only women's events were held as part of the boules sports programme at The World Games. It was also the first time since raffa's introduction at the 2009 World Games that it was not contested.

== Medal table ==
* Host nation (United States)

Rank	Nation	Gold	Silver	Bronze	Total
1	Cambodia	2	0	0	2
2	Croatia	1	1	0	2
2	France	1	1	0	2
4	Italy	0	1	1	2
5	United States*	0	1	0	1
6	Thailand	0	0	2	2
7	Serbia	0	0	1	1
Totals (7 entries)		4	4	4	12

== Participating nations ==
- Argentina
- Belgium
- Cambodia
- Canada
- Chile
- Croatia
- Denmark
- France
- Germany
- Italy
- Morocco
- Serbia
- Slovenia
- Thailand
- United States

== Events ==
=== Women ===
Event	Gold	Silver	Bronze
Lyonnaise precision shooting	Nives Jelovica; Croatia	Marika Depetris; Italy	Nataša Antonjak; Serbia
Lyonnaise progressive shooting	Ophélie Armanet; France	Ria Vojković; Croatia	Gaia Gamba; Italy
Petanque precision shooting	Ouk Sreymom; Cambodia	Bekah Howe; United States	Phantipha Wongchuvej; Thailand
Petanque doubles	Cambodia; Ouk Sreymom; Un Sreya	France; Nadège Baussian; Caroline Bourriaud	Thailand; Nantawan Fueangsanit; Phantipha Wongchuvej
