= Powell Avenue Steam Plant =

Retired steam plant in Alabama, United States

- U.S. National Register of Historic Places
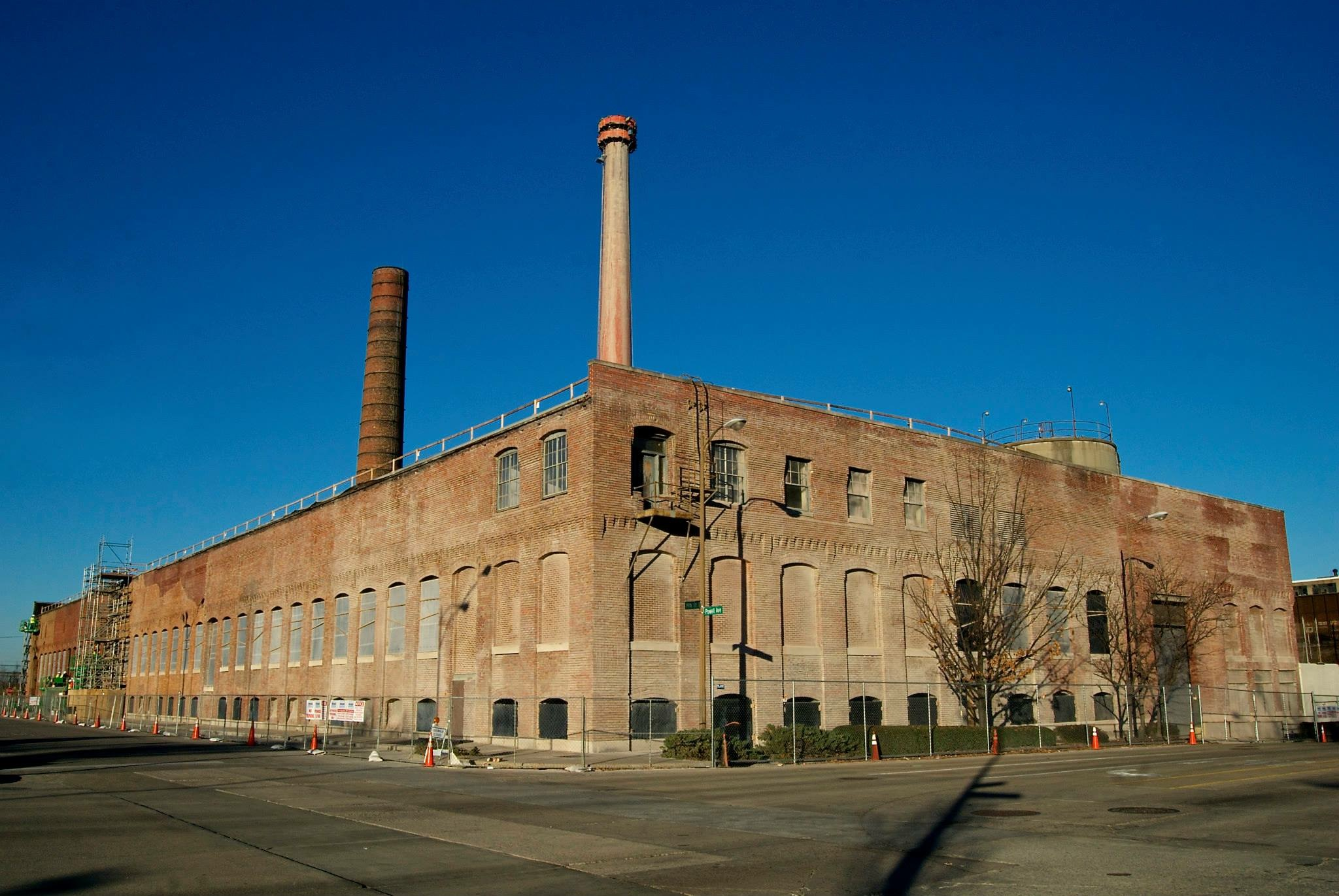
- Powell Avenue Steam Plant in 2015

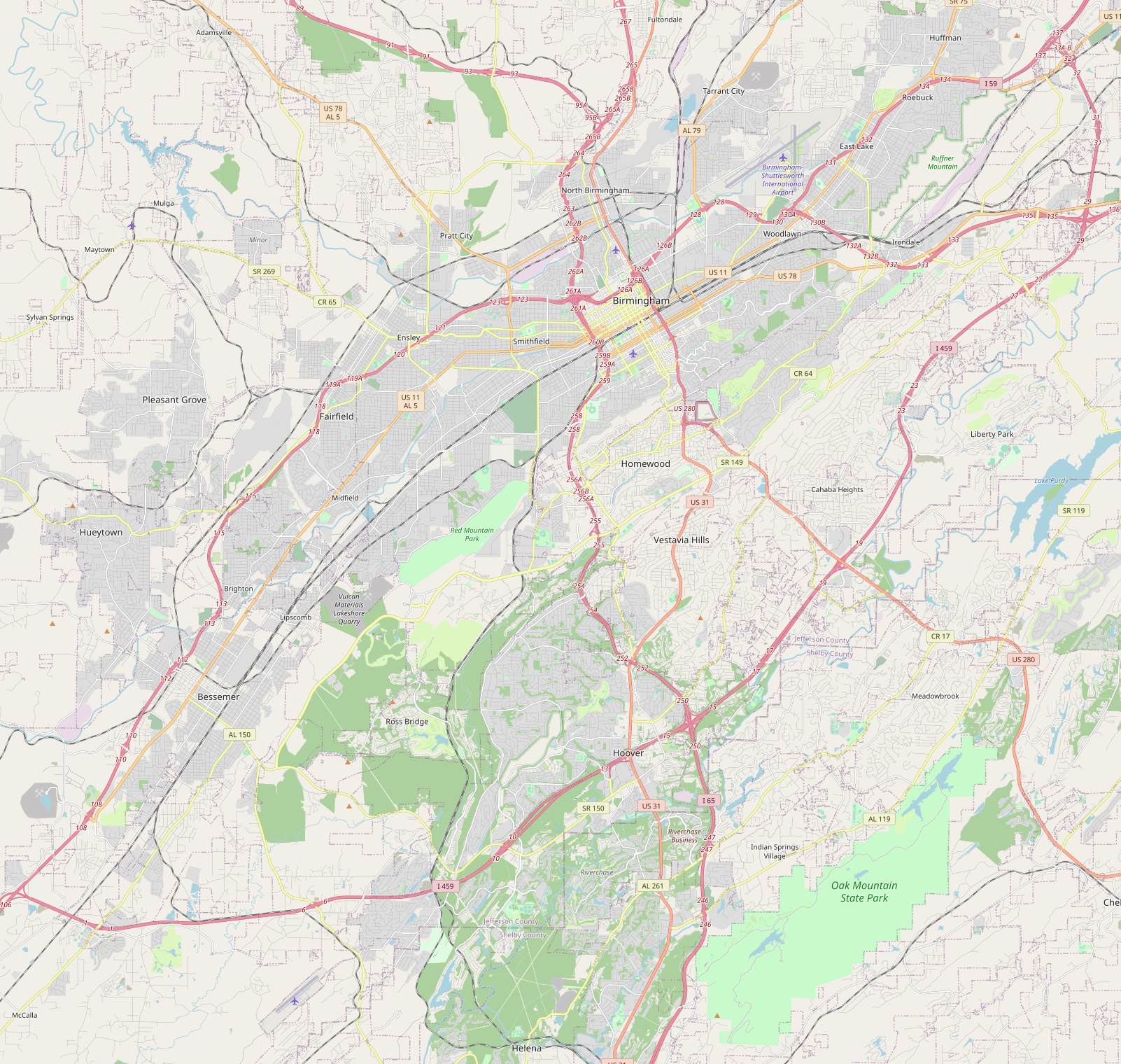
- Location within Birmingham, Alabama Location within Alabama
- Location: 1800 Powell Avenue S., Birmingham, Alabama
- Coordinates: 33°30′41″N 86°48′25″W
- Area: 1.8 acres (0.73 ha)
- Built: 1895
- Architectural style: Late Victorian
- NRHP reference No.: 14001002
- Added to NRHP: December 10, 2014

The Powell Avenue Steam Plant is a retired steam plant and historic building in Birmingham, Alabama, United States, which operated from 1895 to 2013. Initially producing both steam and electricity, the plant stopped producing electricity in 1952. It was listed on the National Register of Historic Places on December 10, 2014.

Since 2014, there have been various plans for the plant to be redeveloped into a mixed-use development. Current owner KultureCity acquired the plant in 2025, with plans to open to the public by 2028.

== History ==
=== Original operation ===
The Powell Avenue Steam Plant was built in 1895 by the Consolidated Electric Light and Power Company. It provided steam and electricity to downtown Birmingham, as well as the city's streetcar system. In 1921, the plant became part of the Birmingham Electric Company, which merged with Alabama Power in 1952. After being acquired by Alabama Power, the plant stopped producing electricity, and was only used for steam production. The steam was used for central heating in some buildings, as well as by hospitals for sterilization and laundry.

The plant, which originally burned coal, was converted to use natural gas as a fuel source in 1967.

=== Switch to coal burning ===
In 1983, Alabama Power announced plans to switch back to burning coal instead of natural gas, due to the rising cost of natural gas at the time. The converted plant would include a baghouse to filter out pollutants. Critics of the switch raised concerns about coal burning releasing sulfur dioxide and nitrogen dioxide into the air, which a baghouse would not filter out. The conversion was put on hold while the Environmental Protection Agency (EPA) studied the proposal.

Initial measurements of the plant's sulfur dioxide emissions showed that, when taken from the rooftops of nearby buildings, the emissions would be in violation of federal air pollution standards. However, if the measurements were taken from ground level, the sulfur dioxide emissions would be within acceptable limits. In June 1984, the EPA ruled that Alabama Power could measure emissions from ground level, allowing Alabama Power to proceed with the conversion. Assistant administrator for air and radiation Joseph Cannon stated that the federal government would not require measurements to be taken from rooftops, although that states could "take such an approach if [the state] so desires".

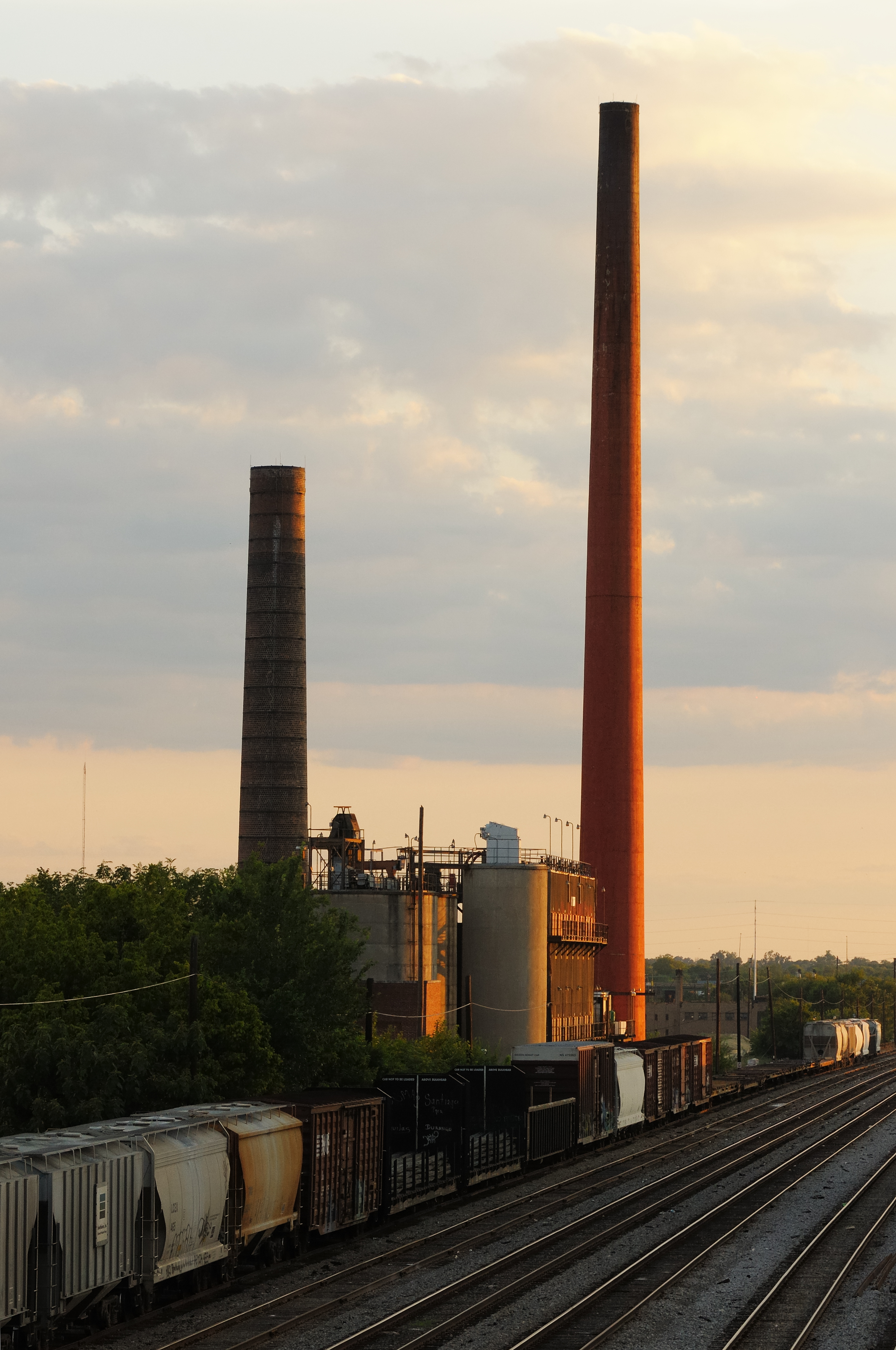
The plant in 2009, showing the smokestacks

In September 1984, the Alabama Department of Environmental Management granted Alabama Power a permit to burn coal at the plant, on the condition that the height of one of the plant's smokestacks was increased from 170 feet to 250 feet. The taller smokestack was intended to spread the pollution over a wider area, reducing the concentration of sulfur dioxide in the air to comply with federal limits. Alabama Power initially disagreed, stating that the current height of the smokestack complied with the EPA's requirements, but ultimately built the taller smokestack. The conversion to coal power cost $9 million in total, and the plant began using coal power in 1986.

=== Closure ===
In 2008, Alabama Power announced that it had plans to close the plant. The University of Alabama at Birmingham, who continued to use steam from the plant for heating and sterilization, had planned to buy the plant for $4.2 million in 2010, although ultimately began constructing a new steam plant in 2011. The plant was decommissioned by Alabama Power in 2013.

=== As historic building ===
In July 2014, Mark Crosswhite, president of Alabama Power, announced the company's intentions to redevelop the building into a mixed-use development, which would include entertainment venues as well as restaurants. Work to stabilize the plant began in September 2014.

During the 2022 World Games, the road speed skating and track speed skating events were held at Powell Avenue Steam Plant on July 8, 2022.

On February 3, 2022, Alamo Drafthouse Cinema announced it had plans to open an Alabama location inside the building in fall 2023. The opening was pushed back to spring 2024, before being cancelled entirely in January of that year. In January 2025, ten years after the initial announcement, Alabama Power cancelled their plans to redevelop the building entirely, and listed it for sale for $10 million. The building was purchased in July 2025 by Alabama non-profit KultureCity for $11 million, who plans to turn it into a mixed-use development inclusive of individuals with sensory processing disorders. KultureCity plans to open the building to the public by 2028.
