= Cambodia at the 2022 World Games =

- IOC code: CAM
- NOC: National Olympic Committee of Cambodia

in Birmingham, United States 7 July 2022 – 17 July 2022
- Competitors: 2 (2 women) in 1 sport and 2 events
- Medals Ranked 31st: Gold 2 Silver 0 Bronze 0 Total 2

World Games appearances
- 1981; 1985; 1989; 1993; 1997; 2001; 2005; 2009; 2013; 2017; 2022

Cambodia competed at the 2022 World Games held in Birmingham, United States from 7 to 17 July 2022. Athletes representing Cambodia won two gold medals and the country finished in 31st place in the medal table.

== Medalists ==
Medal	Name	Sport	Event	Date
Gold	Ouk Sreymom	Boules sports	Women's petanque precision shooting	12 July
Gold	Ouk Sreymom; Un Sreya	Boules sports	Women's petanque doubles	13 July

Multiple medalists
Name	Sport	1st place, gold medalist(s)	2nd place, silver medalist(s)	3rd place, bronze medalist(s)	Total
Ouk Sreymom	Boules sports	2	0	0	2

== Competitors ==
The following is the list of number of competitors in the Games.

Sport	Men	Women	Total
Boules sports	0	2	2
Total	0	2	2

== Boules sports ==
Cambodia won two gold medals in boules sports.
