= Finswimming at the 2022 World Games =

- Venue: Birmingham CrossPlex, Birmingham, United States
- Dates: 8–9 July
- No. of events: 16

The finswimming competition at the 2022 World Games took place on 8 and 9 July 2022, in Birmingham in United States, at the Birmingham CrossPlex. Originally scheduled to take place in July 2021, the Games were rescheduled for July 2022 as a result of the 2020 Summer Olympics postponement due to the COVID-19 pandemic.

== Medal table ==
Rank	Nation	Gold	Silver	Bronze	Total
1	China	5	4	1	10
2	Hungary	4	3	4	11
3	Germany	4	0	1	5
4	Colombia	1	2	3	6
5	Ukraine	1	1	1	3
6	Poland	1	1	0	2
7	South Korea	0	2	2	4
8	Croatia	0	2	0	2
9	Greece	0	1	3	4
10	Slovakia	0	0	1	1
Totals (10 entries)		16	16	16	48

== Medalists ==
=== Men ===
Event	Gold		Silver		Bronze	
50 m apnoea	Zhang Siqian; China	14.02	Tong Zhenbo; China	14.20	Kim Chan-yeong; South Korea	14.23
100 m surface	Max Poschart; Germany	34.50	Filip Strikinac; Croatia	34.90	Anastasios Mylonakis; Greece	36.39
200 m surface	Max Poschart; Germany	1:19.87 GR	Alex Mozsár; Hungary	1:20.03	Ádám Bukor; Hungary	1:20.12
400 m surface	Alex Mozsár; Hungary	2:56.87 GR	Yoon Young-joong; South Korea	2:57.76	Ádám Bukor; Hungary	2:57.83
50 m bi-fins	Szymon Kropidłowski; Poland	18.71	Stylianos Chatziiliadis; Greece	18.74	Christos Bonias; Greece	18.99
100 m bi-fins	Péter Holoda; Hungary	42.35	Szymon Kropidłowski; Poland	42.41	Christos Bonias; Greece	42.59
4x50 m surface relay	Colombia; Juan Rodríguez (15.87); Juan Duque (15.11); Mauricio Fernández (14.54); Juan Ocampo (15.61)	1:01.13 GR	China; Zhang Siqian (15.77); Shan Yongan (15.21); Wang Zhihao (15.37); Tong Zhenbo (14.98)	1:01.33	Germany; Justus Mörstedt (16.11); Malte Striegler (15.79); Robert Golenia (15.17); Max Poschart (14.47)	1:01.54
4x100 m surface relay	Germany; Robert Golenia (35.50); Malte Striegler (35.84); Justus Mörstedt (33.70); Max Poschart (33.09)	2:18.13	Colombia; Juan Rodríguez (35.24); Juan Duque (35.09); Mauricio Fernández (34.18); Juan Ocampo (34.50)	2:19.01	China; Wang Zhihao (36.80); Tong Zhenbo (34.08); Zhang Siqian (35.39); Shan Yongan (33.91)	2:20.18

=== Women ===
Event	Gold		Silver		Bronze	
50 m apnoea	Hu Yaoyao; China	15.75	Shu Chengjing; China	15.90	Paula Aguirre; Colombia	16.27
100 m surface	Shu Chengjing; China	39.32	Xu Yichuan; China	40.05	Grace Fernández; Colombia	40.52
200 m surface	Sofiia Hrechko; Ukraine	1:29.57	Dora Bassi; Croatia	1:30.46	Csilla Károlyi; Hungary	1:30.54
400 m surface	Johanna Schikora; Germany	3:14.22 GR	Sofiia Hrechko; Ukraine	3:16.22	Anastasiia Antoniak; Ukraine	3:18.84
50 m bi-fins	Petra Senánszky; Hungary	20.54	Choi Min-ji; South Korea	21.59	Krisztina Varga; Hungary	21.64
100 m bi-fins	Petra Senánszky; Hungary	45.38	Krisztina Varga; Hungary	47.80	Zuzana Hrašková; Slovakia	48.05
4x50 m surface relay	China; Shu Chengjing (17.47); Hu Yaoyao (16.73); Chen Sijia (18.00); Xu Yichuan (16.75)	1:08.95 GR	Colombia; Paula Aguirre (18.02); Diana Moreno (17.36); Viviana Retamozo (17.45); Grace Fernández (17.28)	1:10.11	South Korea; Moon Ye-jin (18.07); Kim Min-jeong (17.10); Jang Ye-sol (18.27); Seo Ui-jin (17.14)	1:10.58
4x100 m surface relay	China; Shu Chengjing (39.64); Hu Yaoyao (39.26); Chen Sijia (40.83); Xu Yichuan (38.57)	2:38.30	Hungary; Sára Suba (40.75); Petra Senánszky (40.33); Csilla Károlyi (39.25); Krisztina Varga (39.04)	2:39.37	Colombia; Grace Fernández (40.32); Viviana Retamozo (39.69); Diana Moreno (40.41); Paula Aguirre (39.51)	2:39.93
