= Fistball at the 2022 World Games =

- Venue: Birmingham–Southern College
- Dates: 10–14 July
- No. of events: 2

The fistball competition at the 2022 World Games took place in July 2022, in Birmingham in United States, at the Birmingham–Southern College. Originally scheduled to take place in July 2021, the Games were rescheduled for July 2022 as a result of the 2020 Summer Olympics postponement due to the COVID-19 pandemic.

This was the first time when women's tournament in fistball took place as part of the World Games.

== Qualification ==
Men's tournament

Mean of qualification	Dates	Host	Vacancies	Qualified
Host nation	—	—	1	United States
2018 European Championship [de]	24–26 August 2018	(Germany) Adelmannsfelden	1	Germany
2018 Pan American Championship [de]	12–14 October 2018	(Argentina) Buenos Aires	1	Brazil
2019 World Championship [de]	11–17 August 2019	(Switzerland) Winterthur	5	Austria; Switzerland; Italy; Chile; Argentina

Women's tournament

Mean of qualification	Dates	Host	Vacancies	Qualified
Host nation	—	—	1	United States
2018 World Championship [de]	24–28 July 2018	(Austria) Linz	2	Switzerland; Austria
2018 Pan American Championship	12–14 October 2018	(Argentina) Buenos Aires	1	Brazil
2019 Oceania Championship	25–26 May 2019	(New Zealand) Rangiora	1	New Zealand
2019 European Championship [de]	18–20 July 2019	(Czech Republic) Lázně Bohdaneč	1	Germany

== Participating nations ==
- Argentina
- Austria
- Brazil
- Chile
- Germany
- Italy
- New Zealand
- Switzerland
- United States

== Medal table ==
Rank	Nation	Gold	Silver	Bronze	Total
1	Germany	2	0	0	2
2	Switzerland	0	2	0	2
3	Brazil	0	0	2	2
Totals (3 entries)		2	2	2	6

== Medalists ==
Event	Gold	Silver	Bronze
Men	Germany; Tim Albrecht; Philip Hofmann; Rouven Kadgien; Felix Klassen; Philipp Kubler; Fabian Sagstetter; Ole Schachtsiek; Jonas Schroter; Patrick Thomas; Nick Trinemeier	Switzerland; Tim Egolf; Joel Fehr; Nicolas Fehr; Luca Fluckiger; Leon Heitz; Silvan Jung; Ueli Rebsamen; Raphael Schlattinger; Cedric Steinbauer; Rico Strassmann	Brazil; Gabriel Araújo; Bruno Arnold; Douglas Brados; Gabriel Drumm; Rafael Galvão; Gabriel Heck; Mateus Kuntzler; Sérgio Mueller; Alexandre Passos; Fernando Tedesco
Women	Germany; Anna-Lisa Aldinger; Helle Grossmann; Michaela Grzywatz; Ida Hollmann; Luca von Loh; Sonja Pfrommer; Henriette Schell; Svenja Schröder; Theresa Schröder; Hinrike Seitz	Switzerland; Tanja Bognar; Jamie Bucher; Noemi Egolf; Fabienne Frischknecht; Rahel Hess; Adela Lang; Sarina Mattle; Sara Peterhans; Seraina Schenker; Mirjam Schlattinger	Brazil; Cristiane Huaska; Cecília Jaques; Melissa Knebel; Giovanna Lucchin; Isabella Lucchin; Ângela Melo; Tatiane Schneider; Rejane Sinhori; Bianca Suffert; Sabine Suffert
