= China at the 2022 World Games =

- IOC code: CHN
- NOC: Chinese Olympic Committee

in Birmingham, United States 7 July 2022 – 17 July 2022
- Competitors: 40 (19 men and 21 women) in 7 sports
- Medals Ranked 10th: Gold 9 Silver 4 Bronze 1 Total 14

World Games appearances
- 1981; 1985; 1989; 1993; 1997; 2001; 2005; 2009; 2013; 2017; 2022; 2025

China competed at the 2022 World Games held in Birmingham, United States from 7 to 17 July 2022. Athletes representing China won nine gold medals, four silver medals and one bronze medal. The country finished in 10th place in the medal table.

== Medalists ==
Medal	Name	Sport	Event	Date
Gold	Hu Yaoyao	Finswimming	Women's 50 m apnoea	8 July
Gold	Shu Chengjing	Finswimming	Women's 100 m surface	9 July
Gold	Zhang Siqian	Finswimming	Men's 50 m apnoea	9 July
Gold	Shu Chengjing; Hu Yaoyao; Chen Sijia; Xu Yichuan	Finswimming	Women's 4 × 50 metre surface relay	9 July
Gold	Shu Chengjing; Hu Yaoyao; Chen Sijia; Xu Yichuan	Finswimming	Women's 4 × 100 metre surface relay	8 July
Silver	Shu Chengjing	Finswimming	Women's 50 m apnoea	8 July
Silver	Zhang Siqian; Shan Yongan; Wang Zhihao; Tong Zhenbo	Finswimming	Men's 4 × 50 metre surface relay	8 July
Silver	Xu Yichuan	Finswimming	Women's 100 m surface	9 July
Silver	Tong Zhenbo	Finswimming	Men's 50 m apnoea	9 July
Bronze	Wang Zhihao; Tong Zhenbo; Zhang Siqian; Shan Yongan	Finswimming	Men's 4 × 100 metre surface relay	9 July

=== Invitational sports ===
Medal	Name	Sport	Event	Date
Gold	Liu Zhongxin	Wushu	Men's nanquan & nangun	12 July
Gold	Wu Zhaohua	Wushu	Men's daoshu & gunshu	12 July
Gold	Lai Xiaoxiao	Wushu	Women's changquan	13 July
Gold	Zhang Yaling	Wushu	Women's nanquan & nandao	13 July

== Competitors ==
The following is the list of number of competitors in the Games.

Sport	Men	Women	Total
Air sports	1	1	2
Bowling	2	0	2
Dancesport	4	6	10
Finswimming	4	4	8
Korfball	6	7	13
Squash	0	1	1
Wushu	2	2	4
Total	19	21	40

== Air sports ==
China competed in drone racing.

== Bowling ==
China competed in bowling.

== Finswimming ==
China won ten medals in finswimming.

== Korfball ==
China finished in 5th place in the korfball tournament.

== Squash ==
China competed in squash.

== Wushu ==
China won four gold medals in wushu.
