= Taryn Grant =

Canadian water skier (born 1994)

Personal information
- Born: November 19, 1994 (age 31)

Sport
- Country: Canada
- Sport: Water skiing
Medal record
Representing Canada
World Games
Water skiing
Silver medal – second place	2022 Birmingham	Women's jump

Taryn Grant (born November 19, 1994) is a Canadian water skier. She competed at the 2022 World Games in the water skiing competition, winning the silver medal in the women's jump event.
