= Lauren Morgan =

American water skier

Personal information
- Nickname: Poochie
- Born: April 28, 1993 (age 33) Tampa, Florida, U.S.

Sport
- Country: United States
- Sport: Water skiing
- Event: Jump
Medal record
Representing United States
World Games
Water skiing
Gold medal – first place	2022 Birmingham	Women's jump

Lauren Morgan (born April 28, 1993) is an American water skier. She participated at the 2022 World Games in the water skiing competition, where she won the gold medal in the women's jump event. Lauren also won the bronze medal at the 2021 and 2023 World Water Ski Championships.
