= Sumo at the 2022 World Games – Women's lightweight =

Sumo – Women's Lightweight at the 2022 World Games
- Venue: Boutwell Auditorium, Birmingham, United States
- Dates: 9 July 2022
- Competitors: 16 from 11 nations

Medalists
gold medal
silver medal
bronze medal

The women's lightweight competition in sumo at the 2022 World Games took place on 9 July 2022 at the Boutwell Auditorium in Birmingham, United States.

== Competition format ==
A total of 16 athletes entered the competition. They fought in the cup system with repechages.

== Results ==
=== Main draw ===
Round of 16
(Poland) Aleksandra Rozum	W
(Norway) Sofie Jorgensen
(Chinese Taipei) Mai-Shang Ni-Ka-Le
(Japan) Miku Yamanaka	W
(Ukraine) Alina Duzhenko	W
(United States) Ketzel Jefferson-Vanduzen
(Estonia) Eva-Maria Raudsepp
(Poland) Lena Andrzejak	W
(Germany) Stephanie Steinmetz	W
(United States) Elizabeth Salazar
(Mongolia) Otgonchimeg Purevjargal
(Poland) Magdalena Macios	W
(Japan) Yuka Okutomi	W
(Brazil) Luciana Montgomery Watanabe
(Argentina) Moira Santillan	W
(United States) Liesel Rickhoff

Quarter-finals
(Poland) Aleksandra Rozum
(Japan) Miku Yamanaka	W
(Ukraine) Alina Duzhenko	W
(Poland) Lena Andrzejak
(Germany) Stephanie Steinmetz
(Poland) Magdalena Macios	W
(Japan) Yuka Okutomi	W
(Argentina) Moira Santillan

Semi-finals
(Japan) Miku Yamanaka	W
(Ukraine) Alina Duzhenko
(Poland) Magdalena Macios
(Japan) Yuka Okutomi	W

Final
(Japan) Miku Yamanaka
(Japan) Yuka Okutomi	W

=== Repechages ===
Round of 16 Repechage
(Poland) Aleksandra Rozum	W
(Chinese Taipei) Mai-Shang Ni-Ka-Le
(Poland) Lena Andrzejak	W
(United States) Ketzel Jefferson-Vanduzen
(Germany) Stephanie Steinmetz	W
(Mongolia) Otgonchimeg Purevjargal
(Argentina) Moira Santillan
(Brazil) Luciana Montgomery Watanabe	W

Quarter-finals repechage
(Poland) Aleksandra Rozum	W
(Poland) Lena Andrzejak
(Germany) Stephanie Steinmetz
(Brazil) Luciana Montgomery Watanabe	W

Semi-finals reprechage
(Poland) Magdalena Macios	W
(Poland) Aleksandra Rozum
(Brazil) Luciana Montgomery Watanabe
(Ukraine) Alina Duzhenko	W

Bronze medal contest
(Poland) Magdalena Macios	W
(Ukraine) Alina Duzhenko
