= Switzerland at the 2022 World Games =

- IOC code: SUI
- NOC: Swiss Olympic Association

in Birmingham, United States 7 July 2022 – 17 July 2022
- Competitors: 102 (72 men and 30 women) in 15 sports
- Medals Ranked 15th: Gold 5 Silver 4 Bronze 3 Total 12

World Games appearances
- 1981; 1985; 1989; 1993; 1997; 2001; 2005; 2009; 2013; 2017; 2022; 2025

Switzerland competed at the 2022 World Games held in Birmingham, United States from 7 to 17 July 2022. Athletes representing Switzerland won five gold medals, four silver medals and three bronze medals. The country finished in 15th place in the medal table.

== Medalists ==
Medal	Name	Sport	Event	Date
Gold	Men's team	Tug of war	Men's outdoor 640 kg	14 July
Gold	Simona Aebersold	Orienteering	Women's sprint	15 July
Gold	Simona Aebersold	Orienteering	Women's middle distance	16 July
Gold	Sascha Lehmann	Sport climbing	Men's lead	16 July
Gold	Mixed team	Orienteering	Mixed sprint relay	17 July
Silver	Noëmi Kuran-Pellegatta; Nicolas Kuran-Pellegatta	Dancesport	Rock 'n' Roll	9 July
Silver	Men's team	Fistball	Men's tournament	14 July
Silver	Women's team	Fistball	Women's tournament	14 July
Silver	Matthias Kyburz	Orienteering	Men's middle distance	16 July
Bronze	Elena Roos	Orienteering	Women's sprint	15 July
Bronze	Women's team	Tug of war	Women's outdoor 540 kg	15 July
Bronze	Sofia Sokl; Thomas Schönenberger	Ju-jitsu	Mixed duo	16 July

== Competitors ==
The following is the list of number of competitors in the Games.

Sport	Men	Women	Total
Archery	0	1	1
Dancesport	1	1	2
Duathlon	3	0	3
Fistball	10	10	20
Floorball	14	0	0
Inline hockey	14	0	14
Ju-jitsu	1	2	3
Karate	1	1	2
Orienteering	3	2	5
Sport climbing	1	1	2
Squash	2	2	4
Tug of war	12	10	22
Water skiing	1	0	1
Wheelchair rugby	8	0	8
Wushu	1	0	1
Total	72	30	102

== Archery ==
Switzerland competed in archery.

Athlete	Event	Qualification		Elimination 1	Elimination 2	Elimination 3	Elimination 4	Semifinal	Final / BM	
Athlete	Event	Score	Rank	Opposition Result	Opposition Result	Opposition Result	Opposition Result	Opposition Result	Opposition Result	Rank
Valentine de Giuli	Women's recurve	313	12	Klesmann (GER); W 77–73	Čavič (CRO); L 85–88	Did not advance				

== Dancesport ==
Switzerland won one silver medal in dancesport.

== Duathlon ==
Switzerland competed in duathlon.

== Fistball ==
Switzerland won the silver medal in both the men's and women's fistball tournaments.

== Floorball ==
Switzerland competed in the floorball tournament.

Summary

Team	Event	Group stage				Semifinal	Final / BM / Pl.	
Team	Event	Opposition Score	Opposition Score	Opposition Score	Rank	Opposition Score	Opposition Score	Rank
Switzerland men's	Men's tournament	Thailand; W 10–3	Latvia; L 5–6	Sweden; L 0–3	3	Did not advance	Canada; W 12–1	5

Group play

Pos	Team	Pld	W	D	L	GF	GA	GD	Pts	Qualification
1	Sweden	3	2	1	0	29	7	+22	5	Semifinals
2	Latvia	3	2	1	0	27	13	+14	5	Semifinals
3	Switzerland	3	1	0	2	15	12	+3	2	Fifth place game
4	Thailand	3	0	0	3	6	45	−39	0	Seventh place game

Source: IFF

8 July 2022; 15:30	Switzerland	10–3 (4–0, 2–2, 4–1)	Thailand	BJCC East Exhibition Hall, Birmingham; Attendance: 247

IFF

9 July 2022; 15:30	Switzerland	5–6 (2–2, 2–2, 1–2)	Latvia	BJCC East Exhibition Hall, Birmingham; Attendance: 603

IFF

10 July 2022; 12:00	Switzerland	0–3 (0–2, 0–1, 0–0)	Sweden	BJCC East Exhibition Hall, Birmingham; Attendance: 281

IFF

Fifth place game

11 July 2022; 17:45	Switzerland	12–1 (2–1, 0–0, 10–0)	Canada	BJCC East Exhibition Hall, Birmingham; Attendance: 112

IFF

== Inline hockey ==
Switzerland competed in the inline hockey tournament.

== Ju-jitsu ==
Switzerland won one bronze medal in ju-jitsu.

== Karate ==
Switzerland competed in karate.

Men

Athlete	Event	Elimination round				Semifinal	Final / BM	
Athlete	Event	Opposition Result	Opposition Result	Opposition Result	Rank	Opposition Result	Opposition Result	Rank
Yuki Ujihara	Men's kata	Busato (ITA); L 24.20–24.98	Quintero (ESP); L 24.66–25.80	Díaz (VEN); L 24.60–24.82	4	Did not advance		6

Women

Athlete	Event	Elimination round				Semifinal	Final / BM	
Athlete	Event	Opposition Result	Opposition Result	Opposition Result	Rank	Opposition Result	Opposition Result	Rank
Elena Quirici	Women's kumite 68 kg	Zaretska (AZE); L 1–9	Agier (FRA); L 0–3	Melnyk (UKR); W 5–1	3	Did not advance		5

== Orienteering ==
Switzerland won five medals in orienteering.

== Sport climbing ==
Switzerland won one gold medal in sport climbing.

== Squash ==
Switzerland competed in squash.

== Tug of war ==
Switzerland won two medals in tug of war.

== Water skiing ==
One competitor was scheduled to represent Switzerland in water skiing. He did not start in his event.

== Wheelchair rugby ==
Switzerland competed in wheelchair rugby.

== Wushu ==
Switzerland competed in wushu.
