= Denmark at the 2022 World Games =

- IOC code: DEN
- NOC: National Olympic Committee and Sports Confederation of Denmark

in Birmingham, United States 7 July 2022 – 17 July 2022
- Competitors: 44 (28 men and 16 women) in 13 sports
- Medals Ranked 17th: Gold 4 Silver 3 Bronze 3 Total 10

World Games appearances
- 1981; 1985; 1989; 1993; 1997; 2001; 2005; 2009; 2013; 2017; 2022; 2025

Denmark competed at the 2022 World Games held in Birmingham, United States from 7 to 17 July 2022. Athletes representing Denmark won four gold medals, three silver medals and three bronze medals. The country finished in 17th place in the medal table.

== Medalists ==
Medal	Name	Sport	Event	Date
Gold	Andreas Hansen	Lifesaving	Men's 200 m obstacle swim	10 July
Gold	Jesper Agerbo; Dan Østergaard-Poulsen	Bowling	Men's doubles	11 July
Gold	Mika Guldbæk; Mai Ginge Jensen	Bowling	Women's doubles	11 July
Gold	Mads Pedersen	Canoe marathon	Men's short distance	11 July
Silver	Mads Pedersen	Canoe marathon	Men's standard distance	12 July
Silver	Cathrine Rask	Canoe marathon	Women's standard distance	12 July
Silver	Lucas Andersen	Ju-jitsu	Men's fighting 77 kg	15 July
Bronze	Rebekka Dahl	Ju-jitsu	Women's fighting 57 kg	15 July
Bronze	Liva Tanzer	Ju-jitsu	Women's fighting 70 kg	15 July
Bronze	Rasmus Steffensen	Trampoline gymnastics	Men's tumbling	17 July

== Competitors ==
The following is the list of number of competitors in the Games.

Sport	Men	Women	Total
Air sports	2	0	2
Archery	1	1	2
Boules sports	0	2	2
Bowling	2	2	4
Canoe marathon	1	1	2
Dancesport	2	2	4
Flag football	12	0	12
Ju-jitsu	2	2	4
Lifesaving	1	0	1
Orienteering	2	2	4
Powerlifting	1	3	4
Trampoline gymnastics	1	1	2
Water skiing	1	0	1
Total	28	16	44

== Air sports ==
Denmark competed in air sports.

== Archery ==
Denmark competed in archery.

== Boules sports ==
Denmark competed in boules sports.

== Bowling ==
Denmark won two gold medals in bowling.

== Canoe marathon ==
Denmark won three medals in canoe marathon.

== Dancesport ==
Denmark competed in dancesport.

== Flag football ==
Denmark competed in flag football.

== Ju-jitsu ==
Denmark won three medals in ju-jitsu.

== Lifesaving ==
Denmark won one gold medal in lifesaving.

== Orienteering ==
Denmark competed in orienteering.

== Powerlifting ==
Denmark competed in powerlifting.

== Trampoline gymnastics ==
Denmark won one bronze medal in trampoline gymnastics.

== Water skiing ==
Denmark competed in water skiing.
