= Ouk Sreymom =

Cambodian pétanque player

Personal information
- Born: 3 April 1975 (age 51) Cambodia

Sport
- Sport: Pétanque
Medal record
World Championships
Gold medal – first place	2017 Ghent	Singles
Gold medal – first place	2021 Santa Susanna	Precision shooting
Bronze medal – third place	2013 Montauban	Triple
Bronze medal – third place	2017 Kaihua	Triple
Bronze medal – third place	2019 Phnom Penh	Triple
Bronze medal – third place	2023 Cotonou	Singles
World Games
Gold medal – first place	2022 Birmingham	Precision shooting
Gold medal – first place	2022 Birmingham	Doubles
Southeast Asian Games
Gold medal – first place	2017 Kuala Lumpur	Doubles
Silver medal – second place	2007 Nakhon Ratchasima	Singles
Silver medal – second place	2009 Vientiane	Singles
Silver medal – second place	2013 Naypyidaw	Doubles
Bronze medal – third place	2015 Singapore	Doubles
Bronze medal – third place	2021 Hanoi	Shooting
Bronze medal – third place	2023 Phnom Penh	Triples

Ouk Sreymom (Khmer: អ៊ុក ស្រីមុំ; born 3 April 1975) is a Cambodian pétanque player.

== Biography ==
At the Pétanque World Championships, Sreymom won gold in the singles category in 2017. She also won gold in the precision shooting category in 2021 and three bronze medals in the triple category in 2013, 2017 and 2019. At the 2022 World Games, Sreymom won both gold medals at the precision shooting and doubles category.
