= Ecuador at the 2022 World Games =

- IOC code: ECU
- NOC: Ecuadorian National Olympic Committee

in Birmingham, United States 7 July 2022 – 17 July 2022
- Competitors: 13 (9 men and 4 women)
- Medals Ranked 44th: Gold 1 Silver 0 Bronze 3 Total 4

World Games appearances
- 1981; 1985; 1989; 1993; 1997; 2001; 2005; 2009; 2013; 2017; 2022; 2025

Ecuador competed at the 2022 World Games held in Birmingham, United States from 7 to 17 July 2022. Athletes representing Ecuador won one gold medal and three bronze medals. The country finished in 44th place in the medal table.

== Medalists ==
Medal	Name	Sport	Event	Date
Gold	Gabriela Vargas	Road speed skating	Women's 10,000 m point race	10 July
Bronze	Gabriela Vargas	Track speed skating	Women's 1000 m sprint	9 July
Bronze	Gabriela Vargas	Track speed skating	Women's 10,000 m elimination race	9 July
Bronze	Gabriela Vargas	Track speed skating	Women's 10,000 m point elimination race	8 July

== Competitors ==
The following is the list of number of competitors in the Games.

Sport	Men	Women	Total
Cue sports	1	0	1
Finswimming	1	0	1
Powerlifting	4	1	5
Racquetball	2	0	2
Road speed skating Track speed skating	1	1	2
Sport climbing	0	1	1
Squash	0	1	1
Total	9	4	13

== Cue sports ==
Ecuador competed in cue sports.

== Finswimming ==
Ecuador competed in finswimming.

== Powerlifting ==
Ecuador competed in powerlifting.

== Racquetball ==
Ecuador competed in racquetball.

== Road speed skating ==
Ecuador won one gold medal in road speed skating.

== Sport climbing ==
Ecuador competed in sport climbing.

== Squash ==
Ecuador competed in squash.

== Track speed skating ==
Ecuador won three bronze medals in track speed skating.
