= Dhanush Babu =

Indian inline speed skater

Personal information
- Native name: Dhanush Babu
- Nationality: Indian
- Born: 6 January 1995 (age 30) Bangalore, Karnataka, India
- Education: High School
- Occupation: Indian speed skater
- Years active: 1999 – present
- Employer: City Skaters
- Height: 6 ft (183 cm)

Sport
- Country: India
- Sport: Inline Speed Skating

Achievements and titles
- World finals: Asian Speed Skating Championship 2018, World Speed Skating Championship 2018

Dhanush Babu is an Indian speed skater. Most recently, Babu represented India in the 2019 World Roller Games held in Spain from 4 to 14 July 2019. He was the first Indian to secure an international roller skating medal for India in 2016 at the Asian Speed Skating Championship and to finish fifth in the 500+D event on the track in 2019.

As of 2019, Babu has won more than 14 gold medals, 10 silver medals, and five bronze medals at India's National Championship. He has won the 100-metre dash in India since it was introduced in 2015, setting a new national record and earning him the nickname "Triple Crown King of the 100-metre". Dhanush has been named national champion and India's best skater six times.

He was conferred with the Karnataka Kreeda Ratna Award in 2018 by Karnataka Government Chief Minister Siddaramaiah for outstanding achievement in national sports. Dhanush is coached by his father Balaji Babu.

== Early life and education ==
Dhanush Babu, originally from Bangalore, Karnataka, India, started skating in 1999 when he was four years old. He graduated from Carmel High School and has represented India more than 15 times in national and international speed skating competitions. His first national championship was in 2002 at Vishakapatnam, where he won one silver and one bronze medal.

== Competitions ==
National level
Year	Competition	Venue	Event	Medal/Participation
January 2013	50th National Roller Sports Championship, Speed Skating.	Virar, Mumbai	Rink 3; Rink 4; Relay	Bronze; Bronze; Gold
January 2015	52nd National Roller Sports Championship, Speed Skating.	Virar, Mumbai	Rink 3; Rink 4; Road 2; Relay; Marathon	Silver; Gold; Gold; Gold; Gold
January 2016	53rd National Roller Sports Championship, Speed Skating.	Pune	Rink 4; Rink 5; Rink 6; Road 2; Relay; Marathon	Silver; Silver; Gold; Silver; Gold; Gold
January 2017	54th National Roller Sports Championship, Speed Skating.	Bangalore	Rink 4; Rink 5; Road 2; Relay	Gold; Gold; Gold; Gold
January 2018	55th National Roller Sports Championship, Speed Skating.	Chennai	Rink 4; Rink 5; Road 2; Road 3	Gold; Bronze; Silver; Gold
December 2018	56th National Roller Sports Championship, Speed Skating.	Vishakapatnam	Rink 4; Rink 5; Road 2; Road 3	Gold; Bronze; Silver; Gold

International level
Year	Competition	Venue	Event	Medal/Participation
September 2012	World Roller Speed Skating Championship.	San Benedetto del Tronto, Italy	Rink 3; Rink 4; Road 2; Marathon	Participation; Participation
October 2012	15th Asian Roller Skating Championship.	Hefei, China	Rink 3; Rink 4; Road 2; Relay; Marathon	Participation; Participation
August 2013	World Roller Speed Skating Championship.	Oostede, Belgium	Rink 3; Rink 4; Road 2; Relay; Marathon	Participation; Participation
September 2014	16th Asian Roller Skating Championship.	Haining, China	Rink 3; Rink 4; Rink relay; Road relay	6th place; 5th place; 4th place; 5th place
November 2015	World Roller Speed Skating Championship.	Kaohsiung, Chinese Taipei	Rink 3; Rink 4; Road 2	Participation; Participation; Participation
September 2016	World Roller Speed Skating Championship.	Nanjing, China	Rink 3; Rink 4; Road 2	Participation; Participation; Participation
October 2016	17th Asian Roller Skating Championship.	Lishui, China	3000 meter rink relay; 5000 meter road relay	Bronze; Bronze
September 2018	18th Asian Roller Skating Championship.	Namwon, South Korea	3000 meter rink relay	Bronze
July 2019	World Roller Games.	Barcelona, Spain	Rink 500+D; Road 100 meters; Road one lap	Ranked 5th; Participation; Participation

== Event specialty and performance ==
- Men's 100m sprint road
- Men's 200m time trial road
- Men's 500m sprint piste
- Men's 1 lap circuit

== See also ==
- Inline Skating
- List of Indian skaters
