= Costa Rica at the 2022 World Games =

- IOC code: CRC
- NOC: Costa Rican Olympic Committee

in Birmingham, United States 7 July 2022 – 17 July 2022
- Competitors: 9 (7 men and 2 women) in 6 sports
- Medals Ranked 47th: Gold 1 Silver 0 Bronze 0 Total 1

World Games appearances
- 1981; 1985; 1989; 1993; 1997; 2001; 2005; 2009; 2013; 2017; 2022; 2025

Costa Rica competed at the 2022 World Games held in Birmingham, United States from 7 to 17 July, 2022. Athletes representing Costa Rica won one gold medal and the country finished in 47th place in the medal table.

== Medalists ==
Medal	Name	Sport	Event	Date
Gold	Andrés Acuña	Racquetball	Men's singles	13 July

== Competitors ==
The following is the list of number of competitors in the Games.

Sport	Men	Women	Total
Bowling	2	0	2
Cue sports	1	1	2
Powerlifting	1	0	1
Racquetball	2	0	2
Road speed skating Track speed skating	1	1	2
Total	7	2	9

== Bowling ==
Costa Rica competed in bowling.

== Cue sports ==
Costa Rica competed in cue sports.

== Powerlifting ==
Costa Rica competed in powerlifting.

Athlete	Event	Exercises			Total weight	Total points	Rank
Athlete	Event	Squat	Bench press	Deadlift	Total weight	Total points	Rank
Manuel Campos	Men's super heavyweight	395.0	295.0	360.0	1050.0	95.58	8

== Racquetball ==
Costa Rica won one gold medal in racquetball.

== Road speed skating ==
Costa Rica competed in road speed skating.

== Track speed skating ==
Costa Rica competed in track speed skating.
