= Road speed skating at the 2022 World Games =

- Venue: Powell Steam Plant; Birmingham, Alabama, U.S.
- Dates: 10–11 July
- No. of events: 8

The road speed skating competition at the 2022 World Games took place on July 10 and 11 2022, in Birmingham, Alabama, United States, at the Powell Steam Plant. Originally scheduled to take place in July 2021, the Games were rescheduled for July 2022 as a result of the 2020 Summer Olympics postponement due to the COVID-19 pandemic.

== Medal table ==
Rank	Nation	Gold	Silver	Bronze	Total
1	Colombia	2	2	0	4
2	Belgium	2	0	0	2
3	Mexico	1	1	1	3
4	Italy	1	0	2	3
5	Spain	1	0	1	2
6	Ecuador	1	0	0	1
7	France	0	3	2	5
8	Chinese Taipei	0	2	1	3
9	Germany	0	0	1	1
Totals (9 entries)		8	8	8	24

== Events ==
=== Men ===
Event	Gold		Silver		Bronze	
100 m	Jorge Martínez; Mexico		Kuo Li-yang; Chinese Taipei		Duccio Marsili; Italy	
1 lap	Duccio Marsili; Italy	1:03.75	Yvan Sivilier; France	1:04.97	Simon Albrecht; Germany	1:05.57
10,000 m point race	Bart Swings; Belgium	27 pts	Daniel Zapata; Colombia	8 pts	Mike Páez; Mexico	2 pts
15,000 m elimination race	Bart Swings; Belgium	25:43.092	Martin Ferrié; France	26:28.464	Francisco Peula; Spain	26:30.817

=== Women ===
Event	Gold		Silver		Bronze	
100 m	Geiny Pájaro; Colombia		Chen Ying-chu; Chinese Taipei		Asja Varani; Italy	
1 lap	Nerea Langa; Spain	1:09.28	Mathilde Pédronno; France	1:09.95	Chen Ying-chu; Chinese Taipei	1:12.29
10,000 m point race	Gabriela Vargas; Ecuador	12 pts	Johana Viveros; Colombia	10 pts	Marine Lefeuvre; France	8 pts
15,000 m elimination race	Johana Viveros; Colombia	29:32.728	Valentina Letelier; Mexico	29:33.173	Marine Lefeuvre; France	29:33.895
