= Guatemala at the 2022 World Games =

- IOC code: GUA
- NOC: Guatemalan Olympic Committee

in Birmingham, United States 7 July 2022 – 17 July 2022
- Competitors: 6 (2 men and 4 women) in 3 sports
- Medals Ranked 63rd: Gold 0 Silver 1 Bronze 0 Total 1

World Games appearances
- 1981; 1985; 1989; 1993; 1997; 2001; 2005; 2009; 2013; 2017; 2022

Guatemala competed at the 2022 World Games held in Birmingham, United States from 7 to 17 July 2022. Athletes representing Guatemala won one silver medal and the country finished in 63rd place in the medal table.

== Medalists ==
Medal	Name	Sport	Event	Date
Silver	Gabriela Martínez	Racquetball	Women's singles	13 July

== Competitors ==
The following is the list of number of competitors in the Games.

Sport	Men	Women	Total
Racquetball	1	2	3
Road speed skating Track speed skating	1	2	3
Total	2	4	6

== Racquetball ==
Guatemala won one silver medal in racquetball.

== Road speed skating ==
Guatemala competed in road speed skating.

== Track speed skating ==
Guatemala competed in track speed skating.
