= Italy at the 2022 World Games =

- IOC code: ITA
- NOC: Italian Olympic Committee

in Birmingham, United States 7 July 2022 – 17 July 2022
- Competitors: 185 (106 men and 79 women) in 28 sports
- Medals Ranked 4th: Gold 13 Silver 24 Bronze 12 Total 49

World Games appearances (overview)
- 1981; 1985; 1989; 1993; 1997; 2001; 2005; 2009; 2013; 2017; 2022; 2025

Italy competed at the 2022 World Games held in Birmingham, United States from 7 to 17 July 2022. Athletes representing Italy won 13 gold medals, 24 silver medals and 12 bronze medals. The country finished in 4th place in the medal table.

== Medalists ==
Medal	Name	Sport	Event	Date
Gold	Silvia Semeraro	Karate	Women's kumite 68 kg	9 July
Gold	Duccio Marsili	Track speed skating	Men's 1000 m sprint	9 July
Gold	Francesco Ippolito	Lifesaving	Men's 200 m super lifesaver	10 July
Gold	Federica Volpini	Lifesaving	Women's 100 m manikin tow fins	11 July
Gold	Duccio Marsili	Road speed skating	Men's 1 lap	11 July
Gold	Duccio Marsili	Track speed skating	Men's 200 m time trial	8 July
Gold	Carola Garra	Powerlifting	Women's middleweight	8 July
Gold	Chiara Rebagliati	Archery	Women's recurve individual	12 July
Gold	Sara Cutini; Matteo Falera; Davide Nacci; Marcello Patteri; Francesco Sebastio	Aerobic gymnastics	Group	13 July
Gold	Sofia Raffaeli	Rhythmic gymnastics	Clubs	13 July
Gold	Cinzia Noziglia	Archery	Women's individual barebow	15 July
Gold	Rebecca Tarlazzi	Artistic roller skating	Women's singles	17 July
Gold	Sveva Melillo	Muaythai	Women's 54 kg	17 July
Silver	Duccio Marsili	Track speed skating	Men's 500 m sprint	8 July
Silver	Asja Varani	Track speed skating	Women's 200 m time trial	8 July
Silver	Debora Pacini; Francesco Galuppo	Dancesport	Standard	9 July
Silver	Francesco Ippolito	Lifesaving	Men's 200 m obstacle swim	10 July
Silver	Fabio Pezzotti	Lifesaving	Men's 100 m manikin carry fins	10 July
Silver	Mauro Ferro; Simone Locchi; Francesco Ippolito; Davide Marchese	Lifesaving	Men's 4 × 50 m obstacle relay	10 July
Silver	Anna Pirovano	Lifesaving	Women's 200 m obstacle	10 July
Silver	Paola Lanzilotti	Lifesaving	Women's 200 m super lifesaver	10 July
Silver	Helene Giovanelli	Lifesaving	Women's 50 m manikin carry	11 July
Silver	Mauro Ferro; Fabio Pezzotti; Francesco Ippolito; Simone Locchi	Lifesaving	Men's 4 × 25 m manikin carry relay	11 July
Silver	Davide Marchese; Fabio Pezzotti; Simone Locchi; Francesco Ippolito	Lifesaving	Men's 4 × 50 m medley relay	11 July
Silver	Paola Lanzilotti	Lifesaving	Women's 100 m manikin tow fins	11 July
Silver	Francesco Ippolito	Lifesaving	Men's 50 m manikin carry	11 July
Silver	Andrea Consolini	Parkour	Men's speedrun	11 July
Silver	Sofia Raffaeli	Rhythmic gymnastics	Ball	12 July
Silver	Sofia Raffaeli	Rhythmic gymnastics	Hoop	12 July
Silver	Sara Cutini; Davide Nacci; Francesco Sebastio	Aerobic gymnastics	Trio	13 July
Silver	Marika Depetris	Boules sports	Women's lyonnaise precision shooting	13 July
Silver	Brando Caruso	Water skiing	Men's slalom	15 July
Silver	Stefano Comollo	Water skiing	Men's wakeboard	16 July
Silver	Alessandro Liberatore	Artistic roller skating	Men's singles	17 July
Silver	Giovanni Piccolantonio; Asya Sofia Testoni	Artistic roller skating	Couple dance	17 July
Bronze	Angelo Crescenzo	Karate	Men's kumite 60 kg	8 July
Bronze	Giuseppe Bramante	Track speed skating	Men's 10,000 m elimination race	10 July
Bronze	Enzo Nardozza	Lifesaving	Men's 200 m obstacle swim	10 July
Bronze	Federico Gilardi	Lifesaving	Men's 200 m super lifesaver	10 July
Bronze	Silvia Meschiari	Lifesaving	Women's 200 m super lifesaver	10 July
Bronze	Helene Giovanelli; Lucrezia Fabretti; Francesca Pasquino; Silvia Meschiari	Lifesaving	Women's 4 × 50 m obstacle relay	10 July
Bronze	Helene Giovanelli; Lucrezia Fabretti; Francesca Pasquino; Federica Volpini	Lifesaving	Women's 4 × 50 m medley relay	11 July
Bronze	Francesca Parrello	Powerlifting	Women's heavyweight	9 July
Bronze	Duccio Marsili	Road speed skating	Men's 100 m	10 July
Bronze	Asja Varani	Road speed skating	Women's 100 m	10 July
Bronze	Marco Morello	Archery	Men's recurve individual	12 July
Bronze	Gaia Gamba	Boules sports	Women's lyonnaise progressive shooting	12 July

=== Invitational sports ===
Medal	Name	Sport	Event	Date
Silver	Alfonso Barbarisi	Wushu	Men's jianshu & qiangshu	13 July
Silver	Men's team	Flag football	Men's tournament	14 July

== Competitors ==
The following is the list of number of competitors in the Games.

Sport	Men	Women	Total
Aerobic gymnastics	6	8	14
Air sports	5	0	5
Archery	2	2	4
Artistic roller skating	2	3	5
Boules sports	0	2	2
Bowling	2	0	2
Canoe marathon	1	1	2
Canoe polo	8	8	16
Cue sports	1	0	1
Dancesport	4	6	10
Finswimming	1	0	1
Fistball	10	0	10
Flag football	12	12	24
Inline hockey	14	0	14
Ju-jitsu	1	0	1
Karate	3	2	5
Kickboxing	1	0	1
Lifesaving	9	8	17
Muaythai	1	1	2
Parkour	1	0	1
Powerlifting	2	3	5
Rhythmic gymnastics	—	2	2
Road speed skating Track speed skating	2	2	4
Softball	0	13	13
Tug of war	12	4	16
Water skiing	4	2	6
Wushu	2	0	2
Total	106	79	185

== Aerobic gymnastics ==
Italy won two medals in aerobic gymnastics.

== Air sports ==
Italy competed in air sports and drone racing.

== Archery ==
Italy won three medals in archery.

== Artistic roller skating ==
Italy won three medals in artistic roller skating.

== Boules sports ==
Italy won two medals in boules sports.

== Bowling ==
Italy competed in bowling.

== Canoe marathon ==
Italy competed in canoe marathon.

== Canoe polo ==
Italy competed in canoe polo.

== Cue sports ==
Italy competed in cue sports.

== Dancesport ==
Italy won one silver medal in dancesport.

== Finswimming ==
Italy competed in finswimming.

== Fistball ==
Italy competed in fistball.

== Flag football ==
Italy won one silver medal in flag football.

== Inline hockey ==
Italy competed in the inline hockey tournament.

== Ju-jitsu ==
Italy competed in ju-jitsu.

== Karate ==
Italy won two medals in karate.

Men

Athlete	Event	Elimination round				Semifinal	Final / BM	
Athlete	Event	Opposition Result	Opposition Result	Opposition Result	Rank	Opposition Result	Opposition Result	Rank
Mattia Busato	Men's kata	Ujihara (SUI); W 24.98–24.20	Díaz (VEN); W 25.38–24.48	Quintero (ESP); L 25.12–26.08	2 Q	Moto (JPN); L 25.52–27.12	Tozaki (USA); L 25.92–26.20	4
Angelo Crescenzo	Men's kumite 60 kg	Ayoub Anis (ALG); L 1–1	Ruiz (USA); W 5–1	Assadilov (KAZ); D 0–0	2 Q	Brose (BRA); L 2–4	Shaaban (KUW); W 1–1	3rd place, bronze medalist(s)
Luca Maresca	Men's kumite 67 kg	Tadissi (HUN); W 1–0	Velozo (CHI); W 1–0	Hernandez (USA); W 9–1	1 Q	Figueira (BRA); L 0–1	Xenos (GRE); L 0–1	4

Women

Athlete	Event	Elimination round				Semifinal	Final / BM	
Athlete	Event	Opposition Result	Opposition Result	Opposition Result	Rank	Opposition Result	Opposition Result	Rank
Carola Casale	Women's kata	Jüttner (GER); W 24.34–23.60	Anacan (NZL); W 24.66–23.58	Sánchez (ESP); L 25.00–26.40	2 Q	Ono (JPN); L 25.08–26.34	Lau (HKG); L 25.54–26.28	4
Silvia Semeraro	Women's kumite 68 kg	Buchinger (AUT); W 4–2	Bratic (CAN); W 4–0	Lingl (USA); W 3–0	1 Q	Zaretska (AZE); W 3–1	Buchinger (AUT); W 4–1	1st place, gold medalist(s)

== Kickboxing ==
Italy competed in kickboxing.

Athlete	Category	Quarterfinals	Semifinals	Final/Bronze medal bout	
Athlete	Category	Opposition Result	Opposition Result	Opposition Result	Rank
Alessio Zeloni	Men's 75 kg	Pečnik (SLO); W 3–0	Moshe (ISR); L 1–2	Dvořáček (CZE); L WO	4

== Lifesaving ==
Italy won 17 medals in lifesaving.

== Muaythai ==
Italy won one gold medal in muaythai.

== Parkour ==
Italy won one silver medal in parkour.

== Powerlifting ==
Italy won two medals in powerlifting.

== Rhythmic gymnastics ==
Italy won three medals in rhythmic gymnastics.

== Road speed skating ==
Italy won three medals in road speed skating.

== Softball ==
Italy finished in 7th place in the softball tournament.

== Track speed skating ==
Italy won five medals in track speed skating.

== Tug of war ==
Italy competed in tug of war.

== Water skiing ==
Italy won two medals in water skiing / wakeboarding.

== Wushu ==
Italy won one silver medal in wushu.
