= Mexico at the 2022 World Games =

- IOC code: MEX
- NOC: Mexican Olympic Committee

in Birmingham, United States 7 July 2022 – 17 July 2022
- Competitors: 78 (29 men and 49 women) in 15 sports
- Medals Ranked 16th: Gold 5 Silver 3 Bronze 4 Total 12

World Games appearances
- 1981; 1985; 1989; 1993; 1997; 2001; 2005; 2009; 2013; 2017; 2022; 2025

Mexico competed at the 2022 World Games held in Birmingham, United States from 7 to 17 July 2022. Athletes representing Mexico won five gold medals, two silver medals and five bronze medals. The country finished in 16th place in the medal table.

== Medalists ==
Medal	Name	Sport	Event	Date
Gold	Miguel Becerra	Archery	Men's compound individual	July 9
Gold	Jorge Luis Martínez	Road speed skating	Men's 100 m	July 10
Gold	Paola Longoria	Racquetball	Women's singles	July 13
Gold	Miguel Martínez Aceves	Kickboxing	Men's 63.5 kg	July 14
Silver	Valentina Letelier	Road speed skating	Women's 15,000 m elimination race	July 11
Silver	Rodrigo Montoya	Racquetball	Men's singles	July 13
Silver	Laura Burgos	Muaythai	Women's 54 kg	July 17
Bronze	Mike Páez	Road speed skating	Men's 10,000 m point race	July 10
Bronze	Andree Parilla	Racquetball	Men's singles	July 13

=== Invitational sports ===
Medal	Name	Sport	Event	Date
Gold	Silvia Contreras; Andrea Delgadillo; Diana Flores; Rebeca Landa; Arianna Lora; Indra Montes; Ingrid Ramirez; Monica Rangel; Pamela Reyes; Xiomara Rios; Ana Valeria Rojano; Sheilla Silva	Flag football	Women's tournament	July 14
Bronze	Victor Balderramos; Bruno Espinoza; Carlos Espinoza; Alejandro Esquer; Cosme Hernandez; Ivan Roberto Mendez; Jorge Olivera; Joshua Olivo; Carlos Olvera; David Ramirez; Said Salazar; Guillermo Villalobos	Flag football	Men's tournament	July 14
Bronze	Víctor Zambrano	Duathlon	Men's individual	July 16

Medals by sport
Sport	1st place, gold medalist(s)	2nd place, silver medalist(s)	3rd place, bronze medalist(s)	Total
Racquetball	1	1	1	3
Road speed skating	1	1	1	3
Flag football	1	0	1	2
Archery	1	0	0	1
Kickboxing	1	0	0	1
Muaythai	0	1	0	1
Duathlon	0	0	1	1
Total	5	3	4	12

Medals by gender
Gender	1st place, gold medalist(s)	2nd place, silver medalist(s)	3rd place, bronze medalist(s)	Total
Male	3	1	4	8
Female	2	2	0	4
Total	5	3	4	12

== Competitors ==
The following is the list of number of competitors in the Games.

Sport	Men	Women	Total
Archery	1	1	2
Beach handball	0	10	10
Bowling	0	2	2
Dancesport	1	1	2
Duathlon	2	2	4
Flag football	12	12	24
Ju-jitsu	3	1	4
Kickboxing	1	0	1
Muaythai	1	1	2
Racquetball	2	2	4
Road speed skating Track speed skating	2	2	4
Softball	0	14	14
Water skiing	3	0	3
Wushu	1	1	2
Total	29	49	78

== Archery ==
Mexico won one gold medal in archery.

Compound

Athlete	Event	Ranking round		Round of 32	Round of 16	Quarterfinals	Semifinals	Final / BM	
Athlete	Event	Score	Seed	Opposition Result	Opposition Result	Opposition Result	Opposition Result	Opposition Result	Rank
Miguel Becerra	Men's compound	708	6	Bye	Gellenthien (USA); W 147*–147	Hernandez (ESA); W 149–148	Perkins (CAN); W 147–145	Boulch (FRA); W 147–146	1st place, gold medalist(s)

== Beach handball ==
Mexico competed in beach handball.

== Bowling ==
Mexico competed in bowling.

== Dancesport ==
Mexico competed in dancesport.

== Duathlon ==
Mexico won one bronze medal in duathlon.

== Flag football ==
Mexico won two medals in flag football.

== Ju-jitsu ==
Mexico competed in ju-jitsu.

== Kickboxing ==
Mexico won one gold medal in kickboxing.

Athlete	Category	Quarterfinals	Semifinals	Final/Bronze medal bout	
Athlete	Category	Opposition Result	Opposition Result	Opposition Result	Rank
Miguel Martínez	Men's 63.5 kg	Oliveira Mestrinier (BRA); W 3–0	Fozilzhonov (KGZ); W WO	Sananzade (UKR); W 3–0	1st place, gold medalist(s)

== Muaythai ==
Mexico won one bronze medal in muaythai.

== Racquetball ==
Mexico won three medals in racquetball.

== Road speed skating ==
Mexico won three medals in road speed skating.

== Softball ==
Mexico finished in 8th place in the softball tournament.

== Track speed skating ==
Mexico competed in track speed skating.

== Water skiing ==
Mexico competed in water skiing.

== Wushu ==
Mexico competed in wushu.
