= South Korea at the 2022 World Games =

- IOC code: KOR
- NOC: Korean Olympic Committee

in Birmingham, United States 7 July 2022 – 17 July 2022
- Medals Ranked 34th: Gold 1 Silver 3 Bronze 4 Total 8

World Games appearances
- 1981; 1985; 1989; 1993; 1997; 2001; 2005; 2009; 2013; 2017; 2022; 2025

South Korea competed at the 2022 World Games held in Birmingham, United States from 7 to 17 July 2022. Athletes representing South Korea won one gold medal, three silver medals and four bronze medals. The country finished in 34th place in the medal table.

== Medalists ==
Medal	Name	Sport	Event	Date
Silver	Yoon Young-joong	Finswimming	Men's 400 m surface	8 July
Silver	Choi Min-ji	Finswimming	Women's 50 m bi-fins	8 July
Bronze	Kim Chan-yeong	Finswimming	Men's 50 m apnoea	9 July
Bronze	Moon Ye-ji; Kim Min-jeong; Jang Ye-sol; Seo Ui-jin	Finswimming	Women's 4x50 m surface relay	9 July
Bronze	Kim Dong-hyeon; Park Dong-hyuk	Bowling	Men's Doubles	9 July

=== Invitational sports ===
Medal	Name	Sport	Event	Date
Gold	Yu Won-hee	Wushu	Men's Taolu Taijiquan & Taijijian	13 July
Silver	Lee Ha-sung	Wushu	Men's changquan	12 July
Bronze	Seo Hee-ju	Wushu	Women's Taolu Jianshu & Qiangshu	12 July

== Air sports ==
South Korea competed in drone racing.

== Archery ==
South Korea competed in archery.

== Bowling ==
South Korea won one bronze medal in bowling.

== Cue sports ==
South Korea competed in cue sports.

== Finswimming ==
South Korea won four medals in finswimming.

== Muaythai ==
South Korea competed in muaythai.

== Racquetball ==
South Korea competed in racquetball.

== Rhythmic gymnastics ==
South Korea competed in rhythmic gymnastics.

== Water skiing ==
South Korea competed in water skiing.

== Wushu ==
South Korea won three medals in wushu.
