= Chile at the 2022 World Games =

- IOC code: CHI
- NOC: Chilean Olympic Committee

in Birmingham, United States 7 July 2022 – 17 July 2022
- Competitors: 28 (18 men and 10 women) in 12 sports
- Medals Ranked 55th: Gold 0 Silver 2 Bronze 1 Total 3

World Games appearances
- 1981; 1985; 1989; 1993; 1997; 2001; 2005; 2009; 2013; 2017; 2022; 2025

Chile competed at the 2022 World Games held in Birmingham, United States from 7 to 17 July 2022. Athletes representing Chile won two silver medals and one bronze medal. The country finished in 55th place in the medal table.

== Medalists ==
| Medal | Name | Sport | Event | Date |
|---|---|---|---|---|
| Silver | Ricardo Verdugo | Track speed skating | Men's 1000 m sprint | 9 July |
| Silver | Alejandra Traslaviña | Track speed skating | Women's 10000 m elimination | 9 July |
| Bronze | Valentina González | Water skiing | Women's jump | 16 July |

== Competitors ==
The following is the list of number of competitors in the Games.

| Sport | Men | Women | Total |
|---|---|---|---|
| Archery | 0 | 1 | 1 |
| Boules sports | 0 | 2 | 2 |
| Canoe marathon | 0 | 1 | 1 |
| Dancesport | 1 | 0 | 1 |
| Fistball | 10 | 0 | 10 |
| Karate | 2 | 0 | 2 |
| Racquetball | 0 | 1 | 1 |
| Road speed skating Track speed skating | 2 | 2 | 4 |
| Sport climbing | 1 | 1 | 2 |
| Water skiing | 2 | 1 | 3 |
| Wushu | 0 | 1 | 1 |
| Total | 18 | 10 | 28 |

== Archery ==
Chile competed in archery.

| Athlete | Event | Qualification | | Elimination 1 | Elimination 2 | Elimination 3 | Elimination 4 | Semifinal | Final / BM | |
| Athlete | Event | Score | Rank | Opposition Result | Opposition Result | Opposition Result | Opposition Result | Opposition Result | Opposition Result | Rank |
|---|---|---|---|---|---|---|---|---|---|---|
| Mariana Zúñiga | Women's compound | 675 | 21 | Prieels (BEL); L 135–136 | did not advance | | | | | |

== Boules sports ==
Chile competed in boules sports.

== Canoe marathon ==
Chile competed in canoe marathon.

== Dancesport ==
Chile competed in dancesport.

== Fistball ==
Chile competed in fistball.

== Karate ==
Chile competed in karate.

| Athlete | Event | Elimination round | | | | Semifinal | Final / BM | |
| Athlete | Event | Opposition Result | Opposition Result | Opposition Result | Rank | Opposition Result | Opposition Result | Rank |
|---|---|---|---|---|---|---|---|---|
| Camilo Velozo | Men's kumite 67 kg | Hernandez (USA); W 1–0 | Maresca (ITA); L 0–1 | Tadissi (HUN); L 4–6 | 3 | Did not advance | | 5 |
| Fabián Huaiquimán | Men's kumite 84 kg | Da Costa (FRA); L 2–2 | Madani (USA); W 7–3 | Kvesić (CRO); L 1–7 | 4 | Did not advance | | 7 |

== Racquetball ==
Chile competed in racquetball.

== Road speed skating ==
Chile competed in road speed skating.

== Sport climbing ==
Chile competed in sport climbing.

== Track speed skating ==
Chile won two silver medals in track speed skating.

== Water skiing ==
Chile won one bronze medal in water skiing.

== Wushu ==
Chile competed in wushu.
