= Colombia at the 2022 World Games =

- IOC code: COL
- NOC: Colombian Olympic Committee
- Website: www.olimpicocol.co (in Spanish)

in Birmingham, United States 7 July 2022 – 17 July 2022
- Competitors: 70 (45 men and 25 women) in 14 sports
- Medals Ranked 9th: Gold 9 Silver 10 Bronze 6 Total 25

World Games appearances
- 1981; 1985; 1989; 1993; 1997; 2001; 2005; 2009; 2013; 2017; 2022; 2025

Colombia competed at the 2022 World Games held in Birmingham, United States from 7 to 17 July 2022. Athletes representing Colombia won nine gold medals, ten silver medals and six bronze medals. The country finished in 9th place in the medal table.

== Medalists ==
Medal	Name	Sport	Event	Date
Gold	Sara López; Daniel Muñoz	Archery	Mixed team compound	9 July
Gold	Juan Rodríguez; Juan Duque; Mauricio Fernández; Juan Ocampo	Finswimming	Men's 4 × 50 metre surface relay	8 July
Gold	Geiny Pájaro	Road speed skating	Women's 100 m	10 July
Gold	Johana Viveros	Road speed skating	Women's 15,000 m elimination race	11 July
Gold	Andrés Jiménez	Track speed skating	Men's 500 m sprint	8 July
Gold	Geiny Pájaro	Track speed skating	Women's 200 m time trial	8 July
Gold	Johana Viveros	Track speed skating	Women's 1000 m sprint	9 July
Gold	Johana Viveros	Track speed skating	Women's 10,000 m elimination race	9 July
Gold	Johana Viveros	Track speed skating	Women's 10,000 m point elimination race	8 July
Silver	Clara Guerrero	Bowling	Women's singles	11 July
Silver	Sara López	Archery	Women's individual compound	9 July
Silver	Juan Rodríguez; Juan Duque; Mauricio Fernández; Juan Ocampo	Finswimming	Men's 4 × 100 metre surface relay	9 July
Silver	Paula Aguirre; Diana Moreno; Viviana Retamozo; Grace Fernández	Finswimming	Women's 4 × 50 metre surface relay	9 July
Silver	Daniel Zapata	Road speed skating	Men's 10,000 m point race	10 July
Silver	Johana Viveros	Road speed skating	Women's 10,000 m point race	10 July
Silver	Andrés Jiménez	Track speed skating	Men's 200 m time trial	8 July
Silver	Daniel Zapata	Track speed skating	Men's 10,000 m elimination race	10 July
Silver	Alejandro Viviescas	Ju-jitsu	Men's fighting 62 kg	16 July
Silver	José Juan García	Cue sports	Men's three-cushion carom	17 July
Bronze	Paula Aguirre	Finswimming	Women's 50 m apnoea	8 July
Bronze	Grace Fernández	Finswimming	Women's 100 m surface	9 July
Bronze	Grace Fernández; Viviana Retamozo; Diana Moreno; Paula Aguirre	Finswimming	Women's 4 × 100 metre surface relay	8 July
Bronze	Mixed team	Flying disc	Mixed tournament	16 July
Bronze	Miguel Ángel Rodríguez	Squash	Men's singles	17 July
Bronze	Brayan Carreño; Daniela Gerena	Artistic roller skating	Couple dance	17 July

== Competitors ==
The following is the list of number of competitors in the Games.

Sport	Men	Women	Total
Archery	1	1	2
Artistic roller skating	2	1	3
Bowling	2	2	4
Cue sports	2	0	2
Duathlon	3	0	3
Finswimming	4	4	8
Flying disc	8	8	16
Inline hockey	14	0	14
Ju-jitsu	2	2	4
Racquetball	1	1	2
Road speed skating Track speed skating	2	2	4
Squash	2	2	4
Water skiing	2	2	4
Total	45	25	70

== Archery ==
Colombia won two medals in archery.

== Artistic roller skating ==
Colombia won one bronze medal in artistic roller skating.

== Bowling ==
Colombia won one silver medal in bowling.

== Cue sports ==
Colombia won one silver medal in cue sports.

== Duathlon ==
Colombia competed in duathlon.

== Finswimming ==
Colombia won six medals in finswimming.

== Flying disc ==
Colombia won the bronze medal in the flying disc competition.

== Inline hockey ==
Colombia competed in the inline hockey tournament.

== Ju-jitsu ==
Colombia won one silver medal in ju-jitsu.

== Racquetball ==
Colombia competed in racquetball.

== Road speed skating ==
Colombia won four medals in road speed skating.

== Squash ==
Colombia won one bronze medal in squash.

== Track speed skating ==
Colombia won seven medals in track speed skating.

== Water skiing ==
Colombia competed in water skiing.
