= Birmingham CrossPlex =

Indoor sports center in Birmingham, Alabama

Coordinates: 33.4961°N 86.8732°W

The Birmingham CrossPlex is a $46 million indoor track and aquatic facility developed by the City of Birmingham, Alabama as the centerpiece of the redevelopment of the Alabama State Fairgrounds near Five Points West. The facility's 200-meter hydraulically-banked running track and 50-meter swimming and diving pool are used by high school and college teams for training and competition.

The CrossPlex facility opened on August 20, 2011. The Greater Birmingham Convention and Visitors Bureau has projected a $13 million economic impact for the venue's first year of operation, based on events which had been booked prior to opening. An additional warm-up pool, which would be usable by the public when not needed for events, was added soon later.

== History ==
Shortly after taking office in November 2007 Birmingham Mayor Larry Langford proposed a large-scale redevelopment of Fair Park which would combine athletic facilities with residential, retail and entertainment facilities. The centerpiece of the redevelopment would be indoor track and swimming facilities. On April 8, 2008 the Birmingham City Council approved the use of $48 million in city funds to initiate construction.

According to the mayor's office, $29 million of the city's funding for the project would come from business license fees which were increased in the Birmingham Economic and Community Revitalization Ordinance. Those revenues were earmarked to service bonds for construction of a domed stadium, but that proposal has been delayed indefinitely. Other funding would come from money earmarked for schools in the Bell Plan (to be used for the athletic facilities), from an economic development fund created by a sales tax increase in the community revitalization ordinance, and from money budgeted to completed or inactive projects and previous allocations to the park.

The Birmingham International Raceway was demolished in 2009 as part of the redevelopment. In September of that year, the City Council approved $7.5 million in contracts to Davis Architects and Brasfield & Gorrie for design and construction management services.

In April 2011, as construction neared completion, the Alabama High School Athletic Association agreed to a five-year contract to use the building for its state track meets and other events beginning in 2012. Birmingham-Southern College agreed to house their swimming and diving teams at the Crossplex in August 2011.

Redevelopment of adjoining property for mixed retail, entertainment and residential uses has been discussed since the beginning of the CrossPlex development. After several false starts, the city contracted with Bob Nesbitt (acting as the Urban Community Development Consortium) in February 2016 to head the development of a 31-acre parcel under a long-term lease agreement. The project is expected to open in the Summer of 2017.

During the 2022 World Games, the Birmingham CrossPlex was the venue for inline hockey, artistic roller skating, speed skating, wheelchair rugby, lifesaving, finswimming, and canoe polo.

== Major events ==
- NCAA Division II Winter Festival: Men's and Women's Indoor Track & Field, Men's and Women's Swimming & Diving and Wrestling championships
  - 2013, 2017
- NCAA Division II Men's and Women's Indoor Track & Field championships
  - 2015, 2017
- NCAA Division I Men's and Women's Indoor Track & Field championships
  - 2016, 2019, 2022
- NCAA Division III Men's and Women's Indoor Track & Field championships
  - 2018, 2023
- 2022 NCAA Division II Women's Basketball finals
