= Lifesaving at the 2025 World Games – Women's 4x50-metres pool life saver relay =

Women's 4x50-metres pool life saver relay at the 2025 World Games
- Venue: Chengdu Sport University Sancha Lake Campus Natatorium, Chengdu, China
- Date: 8 August
- Competitors: 32 from 8 nations

Medalists
1st place, gold medalist(s)		Nina Holt; Julia Hennig; Lena Oppermann; Undine Lauerwald	Germany
2nd place, silver medalist(s)		Francesca Pasquino; Valentina Pasquino; Helene Giovanelli; Federica Volpini	Italy
3rd place, bronze medalist(s)		Piper Asquith; Rachel Eddy; Mariah Jones; Cyra Bender	Australia

The women's 4x50-metres pool life saver relay competition at the 2025 World Games took place on 8 August at the Chengdu Sport University Sancha Lake Campus Natatorium in Chengdu, China.

== Background ==
=== Competition format ===
A total of eight teams of four athletes each qualified based on a qualifying time.

=== World Record ===
Record	Athlete (nation)	Time (s)	Location	Date
World record	Italy	1:53.78	Riccione, Italy	26 May 2024

== Results ==
The results were a follows:

Rank	Lane	Athlete	Nation	Time	Note
1st place, gold medalist(s)	8	Germany	Nina Holt (24.98); Julia Hennig (3.19); Lena Oppermann (22.01); Undine Lauerwald (1:00.89)	1:51.07	WR
2nd place, silver medalist(s)	4	Italy	Francesca Pasquino (26.76); Valentina Pasquino (10.95); Helene Giovanelli (20.83); Federica Volpini (56.60)	1:55.14	
3rd place, bronze medalist(s)	3	Australia	Piper Asquith (26.61); Rachel Eddy (12.89); Mariah Jones (41.15); Cyra Bender (37.88)	1:58.53	
4	6	France	Margaux Fabre (25.90); Camille Julien (2.65); Romane Boudes (38.45); Magali Rousseau (52.21)	1:59.21	
5	2	Spain	Yael Mantecon (26.99); María Rodríguez Sierra (2.48); Nuria Payola (54.13); Antía García (35.64)	1:59.24	
6	5	Belgium	Marine Harze (27.39); Bo Van de Plas (11.31); Aurelie Romanini (26.36); Elise Croes (55.74)	2:00.80	
7	7	Japan	Saaya Nasukawa (27.02); Hinata Machii (2.17); Yurika Horibe (23.19); Yui Yamada (1:11.54)	2:03.92	
8	1	Poland	Aleksandra Cieplak (26.86); Paula Zukowska (20.19); Victoria Kocjan (36.31); Wiktoria Zemojdzin (43.52)	2:06.88	
