= Archery at the 2025 World Games – Women's individual compound =

Women's individual compound at the 2025 World Games
- Venue: Qinglong Lake, Chengdu, China
- Dates: 7–9 August
- Competitors: 25 from 18 nations

Medalists
gold medal	Andrea Becerra	Mexico
silver medal	Lisell Jäätma	Estonia
bronze medal	Meeri-Marita Paas	Estonia

The women's individual compound archery competition at the 2025 World Games took place from 7 to 9 August 2025 at the Qinglong Lake in Chengdu, China.

== Competition format ==
A total of 25 athletes entered the competition. Ranking round was held to determine seeding. Athletes competed in single-elimination tournament.

== Results ==
=== Ranking round ===
Rank	Archer	Nation	Score	10s	Xs
1	Andrea Becerra	Mexico	706	59	27
2	Alexis Ruiz	United States	705	58	23
3	Madhura Dhamangaonkar	India	705	58	21
4	Alejandra Usquiano	Colombia	703	56	30
5	Mariana Bernal	Mexico	702	55	28
6	Lisell Jäätma	Estonia	701	54	25
7	Begüm Yuva	Turkey	699	53	17
8	Öznur Cüre	Turkey	699	52	32
9	Ella Gibson	Great Britain	699	51	30
10	Meeri-Marita Paas	Estonia	699	51	28
11	Moon Ye-eun	South Korea	698	50	24
12	Parneet Kaur	India	695	49	27
13	Elisa Roner	Italy	694	49	19
14	Sofie Marcussen	Denmark	692	48	17
15	Mariya Klein	Luxembourg	692	47	21
16	Amanda Mlinarić	Croatia	692	46	24
17	Wu Guangjie	China	689	42	16
18	Carson Krahe	United States	687	42	19
19	Geesa Bybordy	Iran	685	42	17
20	Hazal Burun	Turkey	681	37	13
21	Jeanine van Kradenburg	South Africa	679	39	17
22	Rhiannon Mills	Australia	674	38	14
23	Roxana Yunussova	Kazakhstan	673	37	16
24	Elisabeth Taljaard	Namibia	668	34	13
25	Lin Yueshan	China	654	29	12

=== Competition bracket ===
Round of 32; 8 August
17	Wu (CHN)	145
16	Mlinarić (CRO)	147
9	Gibson (GBR)	145
24	Taljaard (NAM)	138
25	Lin (CHN)	138
8	Cüre (TUR)	145
21	Van Kradenburg (RSA)	141
12	Kaur (IND)	144
13	Roner (ITA)	143
20	Burun (TUR)	145
19	Bybordy (IRN)	145
14	Marcussen (DEN)	142
11	Moon (KOR)	146
22	Mills (AUS)	140
23	Yunussova (KAZ)	142
10	Paas (EST)	146
15	Klein (LUX)	146
18	Krahe (USA)	144

Round of 16; 8 August
1	Becerra (MEX)	147
16	Mlinarić (CRO)	142
9	Gibson (GBR)	150
8	Cüre (TUR)	145
5	Bernal (MEX)	145
12	Kaur (IND)	145
20	Burun (TUR)	143
4	Usquiano (COL)	147
3	Dhamangaonkar (IND)	141
19	Bybordy (IRN)	136
11	Moon (KOR)	143
6	Jäätma (EST)	145
7	Yuva (TUR)	141
10	Paas (EST)	146
15	Klein (LUX)	143
2	Ruiz (USA)	144

Quarterfinals; 9 August
1	Becerra (MEX)	148
9	Gibson (GBR)	147
12	Kaur (IND)	140
4	Usquiano (COL)	145
3	Dhamangaonkar (IND)	145
6	Jäätma (EST)	149
10	Paas (EST)	146
2	Ruiz (USA)	144

Semi-finals; 9 August
1	Becerra (MEX)	148
4	Usquiano (COL)	147
6	Jäätma (EST)	145
10	Paas (EST)	144

Final; 9 August
1	Becerra (MEX)	147
6	Jäätma (EST)	146
Third place 9 August
4	Usquiano (COL)	143
10	Paas (EST)	148
