= Air sports at the 2025 World Games – Qualification =

This article details the qualifying phase for air sports at the 2025 World Games. The qualification pathway will be determined primarily based on the rankings maintained by the Fédération Aéronautique Internationale (FIA).

== Qualifying criteria ==
The qualification process for the TWG 2025 allocates quota places to individual athletes by name (nominal qualification), subject to approval by the relevant FAI Member (National Airsport Control, NAC). It adheres to The World Games rules, the Olympic Charter, and the TWG Qualification System Principles, ensuring fair, transparent selection, equitable opportunities for the best athletes, and broad global representation from at least three continents. FAI aims to balance world ranking positions with the participation of as many member nations as possible, with only existing FAI-sanctioned events used for qualification. Athletes must hold a valid FAI Sporting License for Aeromodelling and Spacemodelling. Reference ranking lists for men and women will be based on results from the 2024 World Drone Racing Championship (WDRC) in Hangzhou, China, or, if not held, the 2023 WDRC in Namwon, Republic of Korea, and from 2024 Drone Racing World Cup events. For ranking purposes, only one event per organising country will be counted (the higher score if two events are held), and each competitor's total score will comprise their best three results, including, where applicable, the WDRC. In the case of a tie, World Cup rankings will determine the order, followed by the best single-event result if needed.

Qualification event schedule is as below:

Event	City	Date
FAI Drone Racing World Cup	(Philippines) Tarlac	16 – 18 February 2024
Aircrasher FAI Worldcup	(Germany) Aichtal	11 – 12 May 2024
Paris Drone Racing World Cup	(France) La Queue-en-Brie	18 – 19 May 2024
FAI Korea Drone Racing World Cup	(South Korea) Seoul	1 – 2 June 2024
Drone Racing World Cup Hungary	(Hungary) Mogyoród	7 – 9 June 2024
Trofeo F9U World Cup Italia	(Italy) Sumirago	22 – 23 June 2024
Drone Club Varna Cup	(Bulgaria) Varna	20 – 21 July 2024
DX Racing Serbia	(Serbia) Bela Crkva	27 – 28 July 2024
Phoenix Drone Racing	(North Macedonia) Prilep	14 – 15 September 2024
Gaelic Cup	(Spain) Madrid	20 – 21 September 2024
Türkiye Drone Race	(Turkey) Istanbul	28 – 29 September 2024
Namwon World Drane Racing Masters	(South Korea) Namwon	4 – 6 October 2024
FAI World Drone Racing Championships	(China) Hangzhou	31 October – 3 November 2024

== Qualified players ==
The following tables reflect the official entry lists for the event.

Ranking figures for all lists are based on the reference rankings of 17 November 2024.

^{a}	Player did not enter due to: Withdraw; Declined to compete; Was not selected by their governing body.
^{b}	Player is ineligible because of the three-player limit per NOC
^{w}	Player entry as wildcard

=== Men ===
No.	Rank	Player	NOC	Points	NOC Rank
1	1	Kim Min-jae (born 2008)	South Korea	146	1
2	2	Killian Rousseau	France	136	1
3	3	Choi Won-kyun	South Korea	130	2
^{a}	4	Lee Min-seo	South Korea	117	–
4	5	Yuki Hashimoto	Japan	115	1
4	5	Kim Tae-yang	South Korea	115	3
4	5	Paweł Laszczak	Poland	115	1
7	8	Arvin Schröder	Germany	113	1
8	9	Tomass Pētersons	Latvia	106	1
9	10	Dorlan Couailles	France	104	2
10	11	Huang Yueqi	China	103	1
10	11	Marvin Schäpper	Liechtenstein	103	1
^{a}	13	Antoni Georgiev	Bulgaria	99	–
12	14	Peng Longxin	China	98	2
^{b}	15	Kim Min-chan	South Korea	95	–
^{a}	16	Dimo Shterev	Bulgaria	94	–
^{b}	17	Guillaume Bailleau	France	93	–
^{b}	18	Jang Hyeon-jin	South Korea	92	–
^{b}	19	Lucas Beaudouin	France	87	–
13	20	Felix Strohmeier	Germany	86	2
^{b}	20	Um Jeong-woong	South Korea	86	–
14	22	Maximilien Pellichero	Belgium	85	1
^{b}	22	Swan Versmissen	France	85	–
15	24	Vicent Mayans	Spain	84	1
^{b}	25	Wei Xu	China	83	–
16	26	David Špaček	Czech Republic	78	1
^{b}	26	Arthur Valtier	France	78	–
^{b}	28	Alexander Daskalov	Bulgaria	76	–
17	29	Elmārs Misevičs	Latvia	73	2
^{b}	30	Cheng Guo	China	71	–
^{a}	30	Youran Tian	United States	71	–
18	32	Patrick Schwarz	Austria	70	1
^{b}	33	Bai Xize	China	69	–
19	33	Nazım Tüzün	Turkey	69	1
^{b}	35	Aleksandrs Jemeljanovs	Latvia	68	–
20	36	Kwan Chun Yan	Hong Kong	67	1
21	37	Jacob Capobres	United States	64	1
^{b}	38	Li Haozhe	China	63	–
^{b}	39	Arthur Poli	France	61	–
^{b}	40	Liu Quanliang	China	60	–
^{a}	40	Batu Erilkun	Turkey	60	–
22	42	Rodrigo Martínez	Spain	59	2
23	43	Roland Rontó	Hungary	58	1
^{b}	43	Jurjs Masaļskis	Latvia	58	–
^{b}	43	Ali Mercımek	Turkey	57	–
^{b}	45	Marc Espuña	Spain	55	–
^{b}	46	Kim Min-jae (born 2006)	South Korea	55	–
^{b}	46	Timothée Levionnais	France	53	–
24	48	Iosif Grunner	Romania	53	1
^{a}	50	Victor Van der Elst	Belgium	52	–
^{b}	50	Wang Siqing	China	52	–

=== Women ===
No.	Rank	Player	NOC	Points	NOC Rank
1	1	Luisa Rizzo	Italy	85	
2	2	Natalia Astakhova	Serbia	73	
3	3	He Yutong	China	64	
4	4	Wanraya Wannapong	Thailand	31	
5	5	Li Tianxing	China	26	
^{b}	6	Luo Yimeng	China	22	–
6	7	Mo Ga-yeon	South Korea	13	
7^{b}	–	Kalli Ames	United States	–	–
7^{b}	–	Hina Sato	Japan	–	–
