= Lifesaving at the 2025 World Games – Women's 200 metres super lifesaver =

Women's 200 metres super lifesaver at the 2025 World Games
- Venue: Chengdu Sport University Sancha Lake Campus Natatorium, Chengdu, China
- Date: 8 August
- Competitors: 8 from 4 nations

Medalists
1st place, gold medalist(s)		Lucrezia Fabretti	Italy
2nd place, silver medalist(s)		Alica Gebhardt	Germany
3rd place, bronze medalist(s)		Camille Julien	France

The women's 200 metres super lifesaver competition at the 2025 World Games took place on 8 August at the Chengdu Sport University Sancha Lake Campus Natatorium in Chengdu, China.

== Background ==
=== Competition format ===
A total of eight athletes from four nations qualified based on a qualifying time.

=== World Record ===
Record	Athlete (nation)	Time (s)	Location	Date
World record	Magali Rousseau (FRA)	2:16.07	Saint Malo, France	22 May 2022

== Results ==
The results were a follows:

Rank	Lane	Athlete	Nation	Time	Note
1st place, gold medalist(s)	4	Lucrezia Fabretti	Italy	2:23.09	
2nd place, silver medalist(s)	2	Alica Gebhardt	Germany	2:27.19	
3rd place, bronze medalist(s)	8	Camille Julien	France	2:27.33	
4	3	Elisa Dibellonia	Italy	2:29.88	
5	6	María Rodríguez Sierra	Spain	2:30.15	
6	1	Chelsea Jones	Australia	2:30.57	
7	7	Mariah Jones	Australia	2:37.17	
	5	Magali Rousseau	France	DSQ	
