= Archery at the 2025 World Games – Men's individual recurve =

Men's individual recurve at the 2025 World Games
- Venue: Qinglong Lake, Chengdu, China
- Dates: 11–13 August
- Competitors: 12 from 11 nations

Medalists
gold medal	Matteo Borsani	Italy
silver medal	Patrick Huston	Great Britain
bronze medal	Willem Bakker	Netherlands

The men's individual recurve archery competition at the 2025 World Games took place from 11 to 13 August 2025 at the Qinglong Lake in Chengdu, China.

== Competition format ==
A total of 12 athletes entered the competition. Ranking round was held to determine seeding. Athletes competed in single-elimination tournament.

== Results ==
=== Ranking round ===
Rank	Archer	Nation	Score	6s	5s
1	Matteo Borsani	Italy	395	46	20
2	Florian Unruh	Germany	380	33	28
3	Willem Bakker	Netherlands	369	27	29
4	Patrick Huston	Great Britain	368	31	20
5	Ryan Tyack	Australia	364	24	29
6	Florent Mulot	France	360	27	23
7	Cui Jingxuan	China	357	25	23
8	Žiga Ravnikar	Slovenia	356	25	24
9	Alen Remar	Croatia	351	21	24
10	Jelle Daman	Belgium	318	11	21
11	Andrew Querol	United States	303	13	15
12	Gary Yamaguchi	United States	261	5	12

=== Elimination round ===
Pool A

Match 1
Jelle Daman (BEL)	70
Andrew Querol (USA)	67

Match 2
Cui Jingxuan (CHN)	80
Jelle Daman (BEL)	77

Match 3
Florent Mulot (FRA)	85
Cui Jingxuan (CHN)	87

Match 4
Willem Bakker (NED)	88
Cui Jingxuan (CHN)	87

Pool B

Match 1
Alen Remar (CRO)	86
Gary Yamaguchi (USA)	65

Match 2
Alen Remar (CRO)	81
Žiga Ravnikar (SLO)	83

Match 3
Žiga Ravnikar (SLO)	79
Ryan Tyack (AUS)	91

Match 4
Ryan Tyack (AUS)	85
Patrick Huston (GBR)	88

=== Finals ===
Semi-finals
Matteo Borsani (ITA)	61
Willem Bakker (NED)	57
Patrick Huston (GBR)	64
Florian Unruh (GER)	61

Gold medal match
Matteo Borsani (ITA)	61
Patrick Huston (GBR)	58
Bronze medal match
Willem Bakker (NED)	60
Florian Unruh (GER)	59
