= Dancesport at the 2025 World Games – Latin =

Latin at the 2025 World Games
- Venue: Chengbei Gymnasium, Chengdu, China
- Date: 8 August
- Competitors: 48 from 14 nations

Medalists
1st place, gold medalist(s)		Marius-Andrei Balan; Khrystyna Moshenka	Germany
2nd place, silver medalist(s)		Charles Schmitt; Elena Salikhova	France
3rd place, bronze medalist(s)		Guillem Pascual Iniesta; Diandra Illes	Spain

The Latin competition in dancesport at the 2025 World Games took place on 8 August 2025 at the Chengbei Gymnasium in Chengdu, China.

A total of 24 couples participated from fourteen nations.

== Results ==
=== First Round ===
The results were as follows:

Rank	Dancers	Nation	Samba	Cha Cha Cha	Rumba	Paso Doble	Jive	Total
1	Marius-Andrei Balan; Khrystyna Moshenka	Germany	38.33	38.50	38.50	38.42	38.42	192.17
2	Charles Schmitt; Elena Salikhova	France	38.17	38.17	38.00	38.33	38.17	190.84
3	Guillem Pascual Iniesta; Diandra Illes	Spain	37.42	37.42	37.42	37.50	37.33	187.09
4	Bangbang Yan; Yujun Du	China	37.10	36.75	37.00	37.08	36.67	184.60
5	Ionut Miculescu; Andra Pocurar	Romania	36.17	36.67	36.83	36.58	36.42	182.67
6	Konstantin Gorodilov; Polina Figurenko	Estonia	36.25	36.08	36.08	36.17	36.58	181.16
7	Jakub Lipowski; Tereza Kucerova	Czech Republic	35.50	35.75	35.83	35.67	35.67	178.42
8	Eric Testa; Federica Brezzo	Italy	35.17	35.08	35.75	35.08	35.42	176.50
9	Artur Balandin; Anna Salita	Germany	34.83	35.08	35.42	35.08	35.08	175.49
10	Shao Huinan; Quifan Yu	China	34.75	34.33	34.25	34.32	34.50	172.15
11	Vincenc Torremade; Megija Morite	Latvia	34.17	34.25	34.33	34.67	34.33	171.75
12	Alexey Korobchenko; Liana Odikadze	Israel	34.00	33.75	33.83	34.33	34.00	169.91
13	Tomer Zveniatsky; Elizabeta Pustornakova	Israel	33.50	33.75	34.08	34.08	34.25	169.66
14	Razvan Dumitrescu; Jacky Joos	Germany	33.42	33.33	33.50	33.75	33.75	167.75
15	Zhengmin Yu; Zitong Huo	China	32.92	33.42	33.08	32.92	34.00	166.34
16	Bartosz Lewandowski; Anna Walachowska	Poland	33.00	33.50	33.33	33.25	33.07	166.15
17	Andrea Bolzoni; Michelle Maritan	Italy	32.83	33.50	33.08	33.17	33.17	165.75
18	Egor Kondratenko; Mie Funch	Denmark	33.33	33.42	32.83	32.42	33.25	165.25
19	Balazs Hidi; Violetta Kis	Hungary	32.58	33.08	33.08	33.25	33.00	164.99
20	Tudor Ionescu; Daniela Ilco	Romania	33.00	32.75	32.92	32.33	33.25	164.25
21	Tomas Gal; Sabina Karaskova	Czech Republic	32.33	32.75	33.25	32.50	33.00	163.83
22	Florian Baudoux; Natalia Sadowska	France	31.67	31.92	32.00	31.83	32.25	159.67
23	Kairat Algadaev; Julia Seleznyov	United States	32.33	32.00	31.67	31.67	31.58	159.25
24	Cristian Pontarelli; Anastasia Razheva	Italy	31.30	31.67	32.08	31.67	31.42	158.14

=== Semifinal ===
The results were as follows:

Rank	Dancers	Nation	Samba	Cha Cha Cha	Rumba	Paso Doble	Jive	Total
1	Marius-Andrei Balan; Khrystyna Moshenka	Germany	38.67	38.50	38.67	38.58	38.58	193.00
2	Charles Schmitt; Elena Salikhova	France	38.42	38.42	38.42	38.58	38.58	192.42
3	Bangbang Yan; Yujun Du	China	37.33	37.33	37.25	37.33	37.42	186.66
4	Guillem Pascual Iniesta; Diandra Illes	Spain	37.75	37.75	37.58	37.83	37.67	188.58
5	Ionut Miculescu; Andra Pocurar	Romania	36.50	36.50	36.75	36.83	37.08	183.66
6	Konstantin Gorodilov; Polina Figurenko	Estonia	36.25	36.25	36.42	36.33	36.50	181.75
7	Jakub Lipowski; Tereza Kucerova	Czech Republic	36.00	35.83	36.00	35.92	35.92	179.67
8	Eric Testa; Federica Brezzo	Italy	35.50	35.50	35.50	35.67	35.42	177.59
9	Artur Balandin; Anna Salita	Germany	34.92	35.17	35.25	35.42	35.67	176.43
10	Vincenc Torremade; Megija Morite	Latvia	34.67	35.17	35.08	35.33	35.33	175.58
11	Alexey Korobchenko; Liana Odikadze	Israel	34.25	34.25	34.25	34.08	34.50	171.33
12	Tomer Zveniatsky; Elizabeta Pustornakova	Israel	33.92	34.00	34.25	34.00	33.92	170.09
13	Shao Huinan; Quifan Yu	China	34.00	34.08	34.00	33.75	34.17	170.00
14	Razvan Dumitrescu; Jacky Joos	Germany	33.75	34.08	33.83	33.75	33.83	169.24

=== Final ===
The results were as follows:

Rank	Dancers	Nation	Samba	Cha Cha Cha	Rumba	Paso Doble	Jive	Total
1st place, gold medalist(s)	Marius-Andrei Balan; Khrystyna Moshenka	Germany	39.29	39.00	39.33	38.83	39.25	195.70
2nd place, silver medalist(s)	Charles Schmitt; Elena Salikhova	France	38.92	38.75	38.92	38.83	38.58	194.00
3rd place, bronze medalist(s)	Guillem Pascual Iniesta; Diandra Illes	Spain	37.83	37.58	37.88	37.83	37.33	188.45
4	Bangbang Yan; Yujun Du	China	37.67	37.17	37.71	37.08	37.33	186.96
5	Ionut Miculescu; Andra Pocurar	Romania	37.08	36.58	37.08	37.00	36.58	184.32
6	Konstantin Gorodilov; Polina Figurenko	Estonia	36.75	35.92	36.79	36.17	36.25	181.88
