= Lifesaving at the 2025 World Games – Men's 100 metres rescue medley =

Men's 100 metres rescue medley at the 2025 World Games
- Venue: Chengdu Sport University Sancha Lake Campus Natatorium, Chengdu, China
- Date: 8 August
- Competitors: 8 from 6 nations

Medalists
1st place, gold medalist(s)		Kacper Majchrzak	Poland
2nd place, silver medalist(s)		Simone Locchi	Italy
3rd place, bronze medalist(s)		Francesco Ippolito	Italy

The men's 100 metres rescue medley competition at the 2025 World Games took place on 8 August at the Chengdu Sport University Sancha Lake Campus Natatorium in Chengdu, China.

== Background ==
=== Competition format ===
A total of eight athletes from six nations qualified based on a qualifying time.

=== World Record ===
Record	Athlete (nation)	Time (s)	Location	Date
World record	Francesco Ippolito (ITA)	57.66	Lignano Sabbiadoro, Italy	27 January 2021

== Results ==
The results were a follows:

Rank	Lane	Athlete	Nation	Time	Note
1st place, gold medalist(s)	3	Kacper Majchrzak	Poland	57.64	WR
2nd place, silver medalist(s)	5	Simone Locchi	Italy	58.15	
3rd place, bronze medalist(s)	4	Francesco Ippolito	Italy	58.66	
4	6	Jake Smith	Australia	1:00.15	
5	2	Goroco Koindredi	France	1:00.18	
6	1	Raúl Szpunar	Spain	1:01.74	
7	7	James Koch	Australia	1:02.33	
8	8	Samuel Lawman	Great Britain	1:02.71	
