= Duathlon at the 2025 World Games – Men's individual =

Men's individual at the 2025 World Games
- Venue: Xinglong Lake, Chengdu, China
- Date: 14 August
- Competitors: 34 from 20 nations
- Winning time: 1:14:14

Medalists
1st place, gold medalist(s)		Benjamin Choquert	France
2nd place, silver medalist(s)		Arnaud Dely	Belgium
3rd place, bronze medalist(s)		Vincent Bierinckx	Belgium

The men's individual competition at the 2025 World Games took place on 14 August at the Xinglong Lake in Chengdu, China.

== Competition format ==
A total of thirty-four athletes from twenty different nations participated in the race.

== Results ==
The results were a follows:

Rank	Athlete	Nation	Time
1st place, gold medalist(s)	Benjamin Choquert	France	1:14:14
2nd place, silver medalist(s)	Arnaud Dely	Belgium	1:14:23
3rd place, bronze medalist(s)	Vincent Bierinckx	Belgium	1:14:33
4	Thibaut De Smet	Belgium	1:15:05
5	Mohamed Nemsi	Morocco	1:15:25
6	Valentin van Wersch	Netherlands	1:15:31
7	Ondrej Kubo	Slovakia	1:15:42
8	Hugo Figueiredo	Portugal	1:15:47
9	Thomas Cremers	Netherlands	1:15:51
10	Mickael Chaumond	Cambodia	1:16:07
11	David Nuñez Gomez	Mexico	1:16:25
12	Fabian Holbach	Germany	1:16:54
13	Fumiya Tanaka	Japan	1:17:21
14	Thomas Laurent	France	1:18:01
15	Javier Martín Morales	Spain	1:18:46
16	Duan Zhengyu	China	1:18:48
17	Abbas Kiani Falavarjani	Iran	1:18:51
18	Rohan Hickey	Australia	1:19:20
18	Tong Yujia	China	1:19:24
20	Meysam Rezaei Layeh	Iran	1:19:29
21	Anel Acosta	Panama	1:19:37
22	Albion Ymeri	Kosovo	1:19:54
23	Reo Ishizeki	Japan	1:20:06
24	Franklin Yee	Philippines	1:20:37
25	Sam Mileham	Australia	1:21:39
26	Krilan Le Bihan	France	1:21:39
27	Eduardo Nuñez Gomez	Mexico	1:22:39
28	Maynard Pecson	Philippines	1:23:59
29	Ryosuke Kaneda	Japan	1:25:47
30	John Patrick Ciron	Philippines	1:26:50
31	Enkhtaivan Bolor-Erdene	Mongolia	1:27:07
32	Abdulrahman Al-Ghamdi	Saudi Arabia	1:28:13
33	Seyedjavad Hosseini	Iran	1:28:41
34	Brian Moya	Colombia	DNF
