= Archery at the 2025 World Games – Women's individual barebow =

Women's individual barebow at the 2025 World Games
- Venue: Qinglong Lake, Chengdu, China
- Dates: 14–16 August
- Competitors: 11 from 11 nations

Medalists
gold medal	Alicia Baumert	France
silver medal	Cinzia Noziglia	Italy
bronze medal	Fawn Girard	United States

The women's individual barebow archery competition at the 2025 World Games took place from 14 to 16 August 2025 at the Qinglong Lake in Chengdu, China.

== Competition format ==
A total of 11 athletes entered the competition. Ranking round was held to determine seeding. Athletes competed in single-elimination tournament.

== Results ==
=== Ranking round ===
Rank	Archer	Nation	Score	6s	5s	Shoot Off
1	Cinzia Noziglia	Italy	329	21	16	
2	Alicia Baumert	France	310	11	21	3
3	Fawn Girard	United States	310	16	15	2
4	Nicky Fairweather	Australia	305	12	17	
5	He Jingrong	China	299	11	17	
6	Rosemarie Leitner	Austria	297	12	15	
7	Lina Björklund	Sweden	297	8	20	
8	Ana Cano	Spain	295	12	18	
9	Florentina Cristina Bacin	Romania	287	2	21	
10	Claudia Carcacha	Argentina	286	6	17	
11	Christine Schafer	Germany	276	4	17	

=== Elimination round ===
Pool A

Match 1
Claudia Carcacha (ARG)	56
Christine Schafer (GER)	61

Match 2
Lina Björklund (SWE)	61
Christine Schafer (GER)	63

Match 3
Rosemarie Leitner (AUT)	60
Christine Schafer (GER)	57

Match 4
Fawn Girard (USA)	73
Rosemarie Leitner (AUT)	61

Pool B

Match 1

Match 2
Florentina Cristina Bacin (ROU)	68
Ana Cano (ESP)	74

Match 3
Ana Cano (ESP)	62
He Jingrong (CHN)	59

Match 4
Ana Cano (ESP)	64
Nicky Fairweather (AUS)	76

=== Finals ===
Semi-finals
Alicia Baumert (FRA)	43
Fawn Girard (USA)	36
Nicky Fairweather (AUS)	42
Cinzia Noziglia (ITA)	51

Gold medal match
Alicia Baumert (FRA)	50
Cinzia Noziglia (ITA)	43
Bronze medal match
Fawn Girard (USA)	50
Nicky Fairweather (AUS)	42
