= Archery at the 2025 World Games – Women's individual recurve =

Women's individual recurve at the 2025 World Games
- Venue: Qinglong Lake, Chengdu, China
- Dates: 11–13 August
- Competitors: 11 from 9 nations

Medalists
gold medal	Denisa Baránková	Slovakia
silver medal	Chiara Rebagliati	Italy
bronze medal	Roberta Di Francesco	Italy

The women's individual recurve archery competition at the 2025 World Games took place from 11 to 13 August 2025 at the Qinglong Lake in Chengdu, China.

== Competition format ==
A total of 11 athletes entered the competition. Ranking round was held to determine seeding. Athletes competed in single-elimination tournament.

== Results ==
=== Ranking round ===
Rank	Archer	Nation	Score	10s	Xs
1	Elisa Tartler	Germany	370	29	26
2	Denisa Baránková	Slovakia	370	25	34
3	Chiara Rebagliati	Italy	357	23	30
4	Bryony Pitman	Great Britain	353	19	30
5	Roberta Di Francesco	Italy	351	19	28
6	Gaby Schloesser	Netherlands	349	26	21
7	Eleanor Brug	Canada	348	23	18
8	Urška Čavič	Slovenia	346	22	25
9	Aurélie Autret	France	345	16	27
10	Jess Lloyd	Australia	332	13	25
11	Bao Yuning	China	328	14	25

=== Elimination round ===
Pool A

Match 1
Jess Lloyd (AUS)	69
Bao Yuning (CHN)	85

Match 2
Eleanor Brug (CAN)	79
Bao Yuning (CHN)	79

Match 3
Gaby Schloesser (NED)	78
Eleanor Brug (CAN)	82

Match 4
Chiara Rebagliati (ITA)	83
Eleanor Brug (CAN)	79

Pool B

Match 1

Match 2
Urška Čavič (SLO)	79
Aurélie Autret (FRA)	78

Match 3
Urška Čavič (SLO)	78
Roberta Di Francesco (ITA)	88

Match 4
Roberta Di Francesco (ITA)	85
Bryony Pitman (GBR)	82

=== Finals ===
Semi-finals
Elisa Tartler (GER)	53 (4)
Chiara Rebagliati (ITA)	53 (4+)
Roberta Di Francesco (ITA)	56
Denisa Baránková (SVK)	59

Gold medal match
Chiara Rebagliati (ITA)	57
Denisa Baránková (SVK)	59
Bronze medal match
Elisa Tartler (GER)	56
Roberta Di Francesco (ITA)	61
