= Duathlon at the 2025 World Games – Women's individual =

Women's individual at the 2025 World Games
- Venue: Xinglong Lake, Chengdu, China
- Date: 15 August
- Competitors: 29 from 15 nations
- Winning time: 1:25:31

Medalists
1st place, gold medalist(s)		Anahí Álvarez	Mexico
2nd place, silver medalist(s)		María Varo	Spain
3rd place, bronze medalist(s)		Jeanne Dupont	Belgium

The women's individual competition at the Duathlon at the 2025 World Games took place on 15 August at the Xinglong Lake in Chengdu, China.

== Competition format ==
A total of twenty-nine athletes from fifteen different nations participated in the race.

== Results ==
The results were a follows:

Rank	Athlete	Nation	Time
1st place, gold medalist(s)	Anahí Álvarez	Mexico	1:25:31
2nd place, silver medalist(s)	María Varo	Spain	1:25:33
3rd place, bronze medalist(s)	Jeanne Dupont	Belgium	1:25:58
4	Lisa Isebaert	Belgium	1:27:19
5	Mao Shimazaki	Japan	1:27:30
6	Aline Kootstra	Netherlands	1:27:35
7	Yayoi Fukushima	Japan	1:27:43
8	Nelly Rassmann	Germany	1:27:52
9	Lu Ziqing	China	1:28:16
10	Diana Castillo	Colombia	1:28:39
11	Selene Martinez	Mexico	1:29:52
12	Eléonore Hiller	Belgium	1:31:04
13	Narumi Kanke	Japan	1:31:10
14	Edita Pozlerová	Czech Republic	1:31:23
15	Nikola Čorbová	Slovakia	1:31:31
16	Louisa Middleditch	Singapore	1:31:47
17	Genesis Ruiz	Venezuela	1:31:51
18	Kim Mangrobang	Philippines	1:32:10
18	Merry Joy Trupa	Philippines	1:32:40
20	Faezeh Sadat Abedini Nezhad	Iran	1:33:20
21	Annika Faber	Germany	1:33:29
22	Hadis Nasr Azadani	Iran	1:35:58
23	Ng Xuan Jie	Singapore	1:38:10
24	Johaneth Vargas	Venezuela	1:41:40
25	Shokouh Tayyareh Khajouie	Iran	1:41:59
26	Bea Marie Quiambao	Philippines	1:43:17
27	Yong Man Yun	Singapore	1:45:59
28	Mariam Alshamsi	United Arab Emirates	2:05:21
	Julia Klein	Germany	DNF
