= Archery at the 2025 World Games =

- Venue: Qinglong Lake
- Dates: 7–16 August 2025
- No. of events: 7
- Competitors: 100 from 36 nations

The archery competition at the 2025 World Games took place from 7 to 16 August 2025 at the Qinglong Lake in Chengdu, China. The discipline had seven events, three for men, three for women, and one mixed.

== Qualification ==
A total of 26 (compound) and 12 (recurve and barebow) athletes qualified for each event. Multiple qualification events took place during various continental competitions. Additionally, world ranking results also provided with qualification places for the compound events.

== Medal table ==
* Host nation (China)

Rank	Nation	Gold	Silver	Bronze	Total
1	Italy	2	2	1	5
2	Mexico	1	1	0	2
3	Netherlands	1	0	1	2
4	Denmark	1	0	0	1
4	France	1	0	0	1
4	Slovakia	1	0	0	1
7	United States	0	1	2	3
8	Estonia	0	1	1	2
9	Australia	0	1	0	1
9	Great Britain	0	1	0	1
11	India	0	0	1	1
11	Spain	0	0	1	1
Totals (12 entries)		7	7	7	21

== Medalists ==
=== Men ===
Event	Gold	Silver	Bronze
Compound	Mike Schloesser; Netherlands	Curtis Broadnax; United States	Rishabh Yadav; India
Barebow	Simone Barbieri; Italy	Simon Fairweather; Australia	César Vera Bringas; Spain
Recurve	Matteo Borsani; Italy	Patrick Huston; Great Britain	Willem Bakker; Netherlands

=== Women ===
Event	Gold	Silver	Bronze
Compound	Andrea Becerra; Mexico	Lisell Jäätma; Estonia	Meeri-Marita Paas; Estonia
Barebow	Alicia Baumert; France	Cinzia Noziglia; Italy	Fawn Girard; United States
Recurve	Denisa Baránková; Slovakia	Chiara Rebagliati; Italy	Roberta Di Francesco; Italy

=== Mixed ===
Event	Gold	Silver	Bronze
Compound team	Denmark; Mathias Fullerton; Sofie Marcussen	Mexico; Andrea Becerra; Sebastián García Flores	United States; Alexis Ruiz; Curtis Broadnax

== Participating nations ==
- Argentina (1)
- Australia (5)
- Austria (2)
- Belgium (1)
- Canada (2)
- China (7)
- Colombia (3)
- Croatia (2)
- Denmark (2)
- Estonia (2)
- France (5)
- Germany (4)
- Great Britain (4)
- Guatemala (1)
- Hungary (1)
- India (5)
- Iran (1)
- Israel (1)
- Italy (7)
- Kazakhstan (1)
- Luxembourg (1)
- Malaysia (1)
- Mexico (3)
- Namibia (1)
- Netherlands (3)
- New Zealand (1)
- Puerto Rico (1)
- Romania (1)
- Slovakia (2)
- Slovenia (2)
- South Africa (3)
- South Korea (2)
- Spain (3)
- Sweden (2)
- Turkey (4)
- United States (10)
