= Lifesaving at the 2025 World Games – Women's 100 metres manikin carry with fins =

Women's 100 metres manikin carry with fins at the 2025 World Games
- Venue: Chengdu Sport University Sancha Lake Campus Natatorium, Chengdu, China
- Date: 8 August
- Competitors: 8 from 4 nations

Medalists
1st place, gold medalist(s)		Lucrezia Fabretti	Italy
2nd place, silver medalist(s)		Lena Oppermann	Germany
3rd place, bronze medalist(s)		Antía García	Spain

The women's 100 metres manikin carry with fins competition at the 2025 World Games took place on 8 August at the Chengdu Sport University Sancha Lake Campus Natatorium in Chengdu, China.

== Background ==
=== Competition format ===
A total of eight athletes from four nations qualified based on a qualifying time.

=== World Record ===
Record	Athlete (nation)	Time (s)	Location	Date
World record	Lucrezia Fabretti (ITA)	49.30	Milan, Italy	23 April 2022

== Results ==
The results were a follows:

Rank	Lane	Athlete	Nation	Time	Note
1st place, gold medalist(s)	4	Lucrezia Fabretti	Italy	51.09	
2nd place, silver medalist(s)	5	Lena Oppermann	Germany	51.26	
3rd place, bronze medalist(s)	2	Antía García	Spain	51.27	
4	3	María Rodríguez Sierra	Spain	51.37	
5	7	Federica Volpini	Italy	51.46	
6	1	Undine Lauerwald	Germany	51.87	
7	6	Zoe Crawford	New Zealand	52.39	
8	8	Madison Kidd	New Zealand	52.62	
