= Lifesaving at the 2025 World Games =

- Venue: Chengdu Sport University Sancha Lake Campus Natatorium
- Dates: 8–9 August 2025
- No. of events: 16

The lifesaving competition at the 2025 World Games took place from 8 to 9 August 2025 at the Natatorium within the Chengdu Sport University Sancha Lake Campus in Chengdu, China. The discipline had sixteen events, eight for men and eight for women. The obstacle swim events were replaced with rescue medley ones.

== Qualification ==
A total of eight athletes qualified for each event, based on a qualifying time:

=== Qualifying times for the individual events ===
Event	Men	Women
500m Manikin Carry	30.68	36.78
100m Rescue Medley	1:04.87	1:15.25
100m Manikin Carry with Fins	49.55	55.46
100m Manikin Tow with Fins	55.15	1:02.33
200m Super Lifesaver	2:18.35	2:33.08

=== Qualifying times for the team events ===
Event	Men	Women
4x50m Pool Lifesaver Relay	2:02.08	2:02.08
4x25m Manikin Relay	1:13.65	1:28.42
4x50m Medley Relay	1:39.12	1:50.25

== Participating nations ==
- Australia
- Belgium
- France
- Germany
- Hungary
- Italy
- Japan
- New Zealand
- Poland
- Spain

== Medal table ==
* Host nation (China)

Rank	Nation	Gold	Silver	Bronze	Total
1	Italy	6	6	5	17
2	Germany	5	6	2	13
3	France	2	2	3	7
4	New Zealand	2	0	2	4
5	Poland	1	2	0	3
6	Australia	0	0	2	2
6	Spain	0	0	2	2
Totals (7 entries)		16	16	16	48

== Medalists ==
=== Men ===
Event	Gold	Silver	Bronze
50m Manikin Carry	Fergus Eadie; New Zealand	Kacper Majchrzak; Poland	Francesco Ippolito; Italy
100m Manikin Carry with Fins	Tom Durager; France	Davide Cremonini; Italy	Fergus Eadie; New Zealand
100m Manikin Tow with Fins	Davide Cremonini; Italy	Mathieu Perillon; France	Fabio Pezzotti; Italy
100m Rescue Medley	Kacper Majchrzak; Poland	Simone Locchi; Italy	Francesco Ippolito; Italy
200m Super Lifesaver	Francesco Ippolito; Italy	Fabio Pezzotti; Italy	Felix Hofmann; Germany
4x25m Manikin Relay	Italy; Davide Cremonini; Francesco Ippolito; Fabio Pezzotti; Simone Locchi	Poland; Wojciech Kotowski; Adam Dubiel; Mateusz Grabski; Kacper Majchrzak	Australia; Callum Brennan; Jake Smith; Harrison Hynes; Riley Brennan
4x50m Medley Relay	France; Goroco Koindredi; Tom Durager; Kevin Lasserre; Arnaud Cordoba	Italy; Gabriele Brembillaschi; Simone Locchi; Francesco Ippolito; Davide Cremonini	Germany; Sebastien Pierre Louis; Jan Malkowski; Danny Wieck; David Laukfotter
4x50m Pool Life Saver Relay	Italy; Gabriele Brambillaschi; Davide Cremonini; Simone Locchi; Fabio Pezzotti	Germany; Sebastien Pierre Louis; Jan Malkowski; Danny Wieck; Tim Brang	France; Goroco Koindredi; Tom Durager; Elouan Deffin; Arnaud Cordoba

=== Women ===
Event	Gold	Silver	Bronze
50m Manikin Carry	Nina Holt; Germany	Lena Oppermann; Germany	Magali Rousseau; France
100m Manikin Carry with Fins	Lucrezia Fabretti; Italy	Lena Oppermann; Germany	Antia Garcia; Spain
100m Manikin Tow with Fins	Zoe Crawford; New Zealand	Undine Lauerwald; Germany	Madison Kidd; New Zealand
100m Rescue Medley	Nina Holt; Germany	Lena Oppermann; Germany	Helena Giovanelli; Italy
200m Super Lifesaver	Lucrezia Fabretti; Italy	Alica Gebhardt; Germany	Camille Julien; France
4x25m Manikin Relay	Germany; Nina Holt; Undine Lauerwald; Alica Gebhardt; Lena Oppermann	France; Romane Boudes; Magali Rousseau; Camille Bouteloup; Camille Julien	Italy; Francesca Pasquino; Valentina Pasquino; Lucrezia Fabretti; Helene Giovanelli
4x50m Medley Relay	Germany; Nina Holt; Lena Oppermann; Alica Gebhardt; Undine Lauerwald	Italy; Helene Giovanelli; Valentina Pasquino; Francesca Pasquino; Federica Volpini	Spain; Antía García Silva; Núria Payola Anglada; Yael Mantecón Ruiz; María Rodríguez Sierra
4x50m Pool Life Saver Relay	Germany; Nina Holt; Julia Hennig; Lena Oppermann; Undine Lauerwald	Italy; Francesca Pasquino; Valentina Pasquino; Helene Giovanelli; Federica Volpini	Australia; Piper Asquith; Rachel Eddy; Mariah Jones; Cyra Bender
