= France at the 2025 World Games =

- IOC code: FRA
- NOC: French National Olympic and Sports Committee

in Chengdu, China 7 August 2025 – 17 August 2025
- Competitors: 123 (78 men and 45 women) in 21 sports and 104 events
- Medals Ranked 5th: Gold 11 Silver 11 Bronze 16 Total 38

World Games appearances
- 1981; 1985; 1989; 1993; 1997; 2001; 2005; 2009; 2013; 2017; 2022; 2025

France competed at the 2025 World Games held in Chengdu, China from 7 to 17 August 2025. Athletes representing France won 11 gold medals, 11 silver medals and 16 bronze medals. The country finished in fifth place in the medal table.

== Medalists ==
Medal	Name	Sport	Event	Date
Gold	Tom Durager	Lifesaving	Men's 100 metres manikin carry with fins	8 August
Gold	Goroco Koindredi; Tom Durager; Kevin Lasserre; Arnaud Cordoba	Lifesaving	Men's 4x50-metres medley relay	9 August
Gold	Enzo Berthon	Karate	Men's kumite 75 kg	9 August
Gold	Loic Deschaux	Wakeboarding	Men's Cable Wakeboard	10 August
Gold	Estelle Gaspard	Ju-jitsu	Women's 52 kg fighting	11 August
Gold	Marine Lefeuvre	Road speed skating	Women's point race 10,000 metres	12 August
Gold	Victor Crouin	Squash	Men's singles	12 August
Gold	Benjamin Choquert	Duathlon	Men's individual	14 August
Gold	Tiffany Chapon	Powerlifting	Women's classic lightweight	14 August
Gold	Frédéric Marsens	Boules sports	Men's lyonnaise progressive	15 August
Gold	Alicia Baumert	Archery	Women's individual barebow	16 August
Silver	Elena Salikhova; Charles Schmitt	Dancesport	Latin	8 August
Silver	Romane Boudes; Camille Bouteloup; Camille Julien; Magali Rousseau	Lifesaving	Women's 4x25-metres manikin relay	9 August
Silver	Mathieu Perrillon	Lifesaving	Men's 100 metres tow carry with fins	9 August
Silver	Candy Brière-Vetillard	Trampoline gymnastics	Women's tumbling	9 August
Silver	Alexandre Boscari	Freediving	Men's dynamic no fins FFS1-FFS2	10 August
Silver	Farid Ben Ali	Ju-jitsu	Men's 69 kg fighting	10 August
Silver	Eloan Hitz	Parkour	Men's freestyle	12 August
Silver	Marie Stephan	Squash	Women's singles	12 August
Silver	Marine Lefeuvre	Road speed skating	Women's elimination race 15,000 metres	13 August
Silver	Haila Brunet	Road speed skating	Women's sprint 100 metres	13 August
Silver	Haila Brunet	Track speed skating	Women's dual time trial 200 metres	14 August
Bronze	Goroco Koindredi; Tom Durager; Elouan Deffin; Arnaud Cordoba	Lifesaving	Men's 4x50-metres pool life saver relay	8 August
Bronze	Camille Julien	Lifesaving	Women's 200 metres super lifesaver	8 August
Bronze	Magali Rousseau	Lifesaving	Women's 50 metres manikin carry	9 August
Bronze	Stephanie Faure	Ju-jitsu	Women's 63 kg Ne-Waza	10 August
Bronze	Daren Rolland	Muaythai	Men's 57 kg	10 August
Bronze	Alexandre Boscari	Freediving	Men's dynamic with fins FFS1-FFS2	11 August
Bronze	Martin Ferrie	Road speed skating	Men's point race 10,000 metres	12 August
Bronze	Yvan Sivilier	Road speed skating	Men's 1 lap	12 August
Bronze	Martin Ferrie	Road speed skating	Men's elimination race 15,000 metres	13 August
Bronze	Frédéric Marsens; Lisa Gouilloud	Boules sports	Mixed lyonnaise quick shooting doubles	15 August
Bronze	Martin Ferrie	Track speed skating	Men's elimination race 10,000 metres	15 August
Bronze	Marine Lefeuvre	Track speed skating	Women's elimination race 10,000 metres	15 August
Bronze	Nicolas Peyraud	Powerlifting	Men's classic super heavyweight	15 August
Bronze	Hassan El Belghiti	Powerlifting	Men's equipped lightweight	16 August
Bronze	Gael Ancelin; Paul Benvegnen; Camille Blanc; Elliot Bonnet; Zoe Forget; Tifaine Latchy; Chloe Ollivier; Sacha Poitte-Sokolsky; Salome Raulet; Sullivan Roblet; Simon Ruelle; Leo Stanguennec; Chloe Vallet	Flying disc	Mixed ultimate	16 August
Bronze	Lucas Desport; Sandrine Poinsot	Boules sports	Mixed petanque classic doubles	17 August

Medals by sport
Sport	1st place, gold medalist(s)	2nd place, silver medalist(s)	3rd place, bronze medalist(s)	Total
Lifesaving	2	2	3	7
Road speed skating	1	2	3	6
Ju-jitsu	1	1	1	3
Squash	1	1	0	2
Boules sports	1	0	2	3
Powerlifting	1	0	2	3
Archery	1	0	0	1
Duathlon	1	0	0	1
Karate	1	0	0	1
Wakeboarding	1	0	0	1
Track speed skating	0	1	2	3
Freediving	0	1	1	2
Dancesport	0	1	0	1
Parkour	0	1	0	1
Trampoline gymnastics	0	1	0	1
Flying disc	0	0	1	1
Muaythai	0	0	1	1
Total	11	11	16	38

== Competitors ==
The following is the list of number of competitors in the Games.

Sport	Men	Women	Total
Air sports	2	0	2
Archery	2	2	4
Billards	1	0	1
Boules sports	2	2	4
Canoe marathon	2	2	4
Canoe polo	8	0	8
Dancesport	1	2	3
Kickboxing	1	0	1
Flying disc	7	7	14
Gymnastics - Aerobic	4	4	8
Gymnastics - Parkour	1	0	1
Gymnastics - Trampoline	1	1	2
Inline hockey	14	0	14
Ju-jitsu	2	2	4
Karate	2	3	5
Kickboxing	1	0	1
Lifesaving	5	4	9
Muaythai	1	0	1
Powerlifting	5	4	9
Roller sports	2	2	4
Sambo	0	1	1
Squash	2	3	5
Triathlon	3	1	4
Underwater sports	6	3	9
Wakeboarding	2	1	3
Wushu	1	1	2
Total	78	45	123

== Archery ==
Athlete	Event	Ranking round		Elimination round				Semifinals	Final / BM	
Athlete	Event	Score	Seed	Opposition Score	Opposition Score	Opposition Score	Opposition Score	Opposition Score	Opposition Score	Rank
David Jackson	Men's individual barebow	332	6	—N/a						
Alicia Baumert	Women's individual recurve	310	2	—N/a				Girard (USA); W 43–36	Noziglia (ITA); W 50–43	1st place, gold medalist(s)

== Gymnastics ==
=== Parkour ===
Men

Athlete	Event	Qualification		Final	
Athlete	Event	Result	Rank	Result	Rank
Eloan Hitz	Men's speed	DNS			
Eloan Hitz	Men's freestyle	21.8	5 Q	27.1	2nd place, silver medalist(s)

== Inline hockey ==
Summary

Team	Event	Group stage				Semifinal	Final / BM	
Team	Event	Opposition Score	Opposition Score	Opposition Score	Rank	Opposition Score	Opposition Score	Rank
France men	Men's tournament	Czech Republic; L 2–1	Italy; W 4–3	Argentina; W 1–2	2 Q	United States; L 2–1	Namibia; L 3–2	4

== Powerlifting ==
Classic

Athlete	Event	Exercises			Total weight	Total points	Rank
Athlete	Event	Squat	Bench press	Deadlift	Total weight	Total points	Rank
Prescillia Bavoil	Women's heavyweight	192.5	127.5	235.0	555.0	110.65	4
Jade Hai-Ha Jacob	Women's middleweight	180.0	95.0	220.0	495.0	118.60	4
Sovannphaktra Sarah Pal	Women's middleweight	182.5	100.0	202.5	485.0	114.85	6
Tiffany Chapon	Women's lightweight	165.0	107.5	177.5	450.0	124.45	1st place, gold medalist(s)
Noemie Allabert	Women's lightweight	152.2	87.5	190.0	430.0	110.50	7
Antoine Garca	Men's lightweight	232.5	140.0	252.5	625.0	103.59	7
Nicolas Peyroud	Men's Super heavyweight	332.5	220.0	377.5	930.0	109.83	3rd place, bronze medalist(s)

Equipped

Athlete	Event	Exercises			Total weight	Total points	Rank
Athlete	Event	Squat	Bench press	Deadlift	Total weight	Total points	Rank
Hassan El Belghitti	Men's lightweight	290.0	177.5	310.0	777.5	104.92	3rd place, bronze medalist(s)
Sofiane Belkesir	Men's Super heavyweight	425.0	310.0	335.0	1070.0	104.22	4

== Squash ==
Athlete	Event	Round of 32	Round of 16 / CR	Quarterfinals / CQ	Semi-finals / CS	Final / BM / CF	
Athlete	Event	Opposition Score	Opposition Score	Opposition Score	Opposition Score	Opposition Score	Rank
Victor Crouin	Men's singles	Bye	Tsukue (JPN); W 3–1	Wilhelmi (SUI); W 3–0	Rodriguez (COL); W 3–2	Farkas (HUN); W 3–0	1st place, gold medalist(s)
Toufik Mekhalfi	Men's singles	Pena (ROU); W 0–3	Leung (HKG); L 3–1	Classification round White (AUS); L 0–3	Did not advance		=13
Kara Lincou	Women's singles	Bautista (COL); W 1–3	Lee (HKG); L 0–3	Classification round Tycova (GER); L 3–1	Did not advance		=13
Marie Stephan	Women's singles	Zhang (CHN); W 3–0	Tyma (POL); W 3–0	Beinhard (GER); W 3–0	Ho (HKG); W 3–2	Watanabe (JPN); L 3–0	2nd place, silver medalist(s)
Lea Barbeau	Women's singles	Merlo (SUI); L 3–0	Classification round Sugimoto (JPN); W 3–1	Classification round Liu (CHN); W 3–0	Classification round Bushma (UKR); L 3–0	Did not advance	19
