= Lifesaving at the 2022 World Games =

- Venue: Birmingham CrossPlex – Natatorium
- Dates: 10–11 July
- No. of events: 16

The lifesaving competition at the 2022 World Games took place in July 2022, in Birmingham in United States, at the Birmingham CrossPlex. Originally scheduled to take place in July 2021, the Games were rescheduled for July 2022 as a result of the 2020 Summer Olympics postponement due to the COVID-19 pandemic.

== Medal table ==
Rank	Nation	Gold	Silver	Bronze	Total
1	Germany	9	0	5	14
2	Hungary	3	1	0	4
3	Italy	2	10	5	17
4	France	1	2	1	4
5	Poland	1	0	2	3
6	Denmark	1	0	0	1
7	Spain	0	2	1	3
8	Belgium	0	0	1	1
8	Japan	0	0	1	1
Totals (9 entries)		17	15	16	48

== Events ==
=== Men ===
Event	Gold	Silver	Bronze
50 m manikin carry	Danny Wieck; Germany	Francesco Ippolito; Italy	Joshua Perling; Germany
100 m manikin carry with fins	Jan Malkowski; Germany	Fabio Pezzotti; Italy	Tim Brang; Germany
100 m manikin tow with fins	Tim Brang; Germany	Javier Catalá; Spain	Alberto Turrado; Spain
200 m obstacle swim	Andreas Hansen; Denmark	Francesco Ippolito; Italy	Enzo Nardozza; Italy
200 m super lifesaver	Francesco Ippolito; Italy	Kévin Lasserre; France	Federico Gilardi; Italy
4x25 m manikin relay	Germany; Fabian Ende; Joshua Perling; Fabian Thorwesten; Danny Wieck	Italy; Mauro Ferro; Fabio Pezzotti; Francesco Ippolito; Simone Locchi	Poland; Wojciech Kotowski; Adam Dubiel; Cezary Kępa; Hubert Nakielski
4x50 m obstacle relay	Hungary; Szebasztián Szabó; Bence Gyárfás; Krisztián Takács; Gábor Balog	Italy; Mauro Ferro; Simone Locchi; Francesco Ippolito; Davide Marchese	Japan; Naoya Hirano; Takahiro Itaba; Yoshiharu Takasu; Suguru Ando
4x50 m medley relay	Hungary; Krisztián Takács; Gábor Balog; Szebasztián Szabó; Bence Gyárfás	Italy; Davide Marchese; Fabio Pezzotti; Simone Locchi; Francesco Ippolito	Germany; Fabian Ende; Jan Malkowski; Danny Wieck; Fabian Thorwesten

=== Women ===
Event	Gold	Silver	Bronze
50 m manikin carry	Nina Holt; Germany	Helene Giovanelli; Italy	Kerstin Lange; Germany
100 m manikin carry with fins	Undine Lauerwald; Germany	Antía García; Spain	Nina Holt; Germany
100 m manikin tow with fins	Federica Volpini; Italy	Paola Lanzilotti; Italy	Justine Weyders; France
200 m obstacle swim	Nina Holt; Germany	Anna Pirovano; Italy	Alicja Tchórz; Poland
200 m super lifesaver	Magali Rousseau; France	Paola Lanzilotti; Italy	Silvia Meschiari; Italy
4x25 m manikin relay	Germany; Undine Lauerwald; Nina Holt; Vivian Zander; Kerstin Lange	France; Ava Prêtre; Magali Rousseau; Leslie Belkacemi; Ludivine Blanc	Belgium; Sofie Boogaerts; Stefanie Lindekens; Nele Vanbuel; Aurélie Romanini
4x50 m obstacle relay	Hungary; Petra Senánszky; Fanni Gyurinovics; Zsuzsanna Jakabos; Evelyn Verrasztó Poland; Kornelia Fiedkiewicz; Klaudia Naziębło; Paula Żukowska; Alicja Tchórz	Shared gold	Italy; Helene Giovanelli; Lucrezia Fabretti; Francesca Pasquino; Silvia Meschiari
4x50 m medley relay	Germany; Nina Holt; Vivian Zander; Kerstin Lange; Undine Lauerwald	Hungary; Zsuzsanna Jakabos; Panna Ugrai; Fanni Gyurinovics; Petra Senánszky	Italy; Helene Giovanelli; Lucrezia Fabretti; Francesca Pasquino; Federica Volpini
