= Finland at the 2025 World Games =

- IOC code: FIN
- NOC: Finnish Olympic Committee

in Chengdu, China 7 August 2025 – 17 August 2025
- Competitors: 47 (22 men and 25 women) in 6 sports and 8 events
- Medals Ranked 42nd: Gold 1 Silver 2 Bronze 0 Total 3

World Games appearances
- 1981; 1985; 1989; 1993; 1997; 2001; 2005; 2009; 2013; 2017; 2022; 2025

Finland competed at the 2025 World Games held in Chengdu, China from 7 to 17 August 2025.

Athletes representing Finland won one gold medal and two silver medals. The country finished in 42nd place in the medal table.

== Medalists ==
Medal	Name	Sport	Event	Date
Gold	Finland women	Floorball	Women's tournament	13 August
Silver	Finland men	Floorball	Men's tournament	13 August
Silver	Eveliina Salonen; Nestori Tuhkanen	Flying disc	Disc golf	10 August

== Competitors ==
The following is the list of number of competitors in the Games.

Sport	Men	Women	Total
Cheerleading	0	2	2
Floorball	14	14	28
Flying disc	7	7	14
Muaythai	0	1	1
Powerlifting	0	1	1
Underwater sports	1	0	1
Total	22	25	47

== Floorball ==
Summary

Team	Event	Preliminary round				Semifinal	Final / BM / PF	
Team	Event	Opposition Result	Opposition Result	Opposition Result	Rank	Opposition Result	Opposition Result	Rank
Finland men	Men's tournament	China; W 0–42	Canada; W 24–1	Czech Republic; W 8–2	1	Switzerland; W 4–0	Sweden; L 2–1	2nd place, silver medalist(s)
Finland women	Women's tournament	Canada; W 36–0	Singapore; W 0–20	Czech Republic; W 3–2	1	Switzerland; W 5–1	Sweden; W 2–3	1st place, gold medalist(s)

== Powerlifting ==
Equipped

Athlete	Event	Exercises			Total weight	Total points	Rank
Athlete	Event	Squat	Bench press	Deadlift	Total weight	Total points	Rank
Olivia Kyosti	Women's Lightweight	190.0	120.0	155.0	465.0	94.70	6
