= Freediving at the 2025 World Games =

- Venue: Chengdu Sport University Sancha Lake Campus Natatorium
- Dates: 10–11 August
- No. of events: 10
- Competitors: 42 from 14 nations

The freediving competition at the 2025 World Games took place from 10 to 11 August 2025, in Chengdu in China, at the Natatorium of the Chengdu Sport University Sancha Lake Campus. The discipline will include ten events (five for men and five for women). Freediving and Ju-jitsu will debut para sports events. Six events were added for athletes with impairment.

== Qualification ==
A total of ten swimmers for freediving and eight freediving for athletes with impairment qualified for each event, based on the World Freediving Rankings.

== Participating nations ==
- China (6)
- Chinese Taipei (1)
- Croatia (2)
- Colombia (3)
- Cuba (1)
- Denmark (1)
- France (4)
- Hungary (1)
- Individual Neutral Athletes (4)
- Italy (13)
- Japan (1)
- Poland (3)
- San Marino (1)
- Ukraine (1)

== Medal table ==
* Host nation (China)

Rank	Nation	Gold	Silver	Bronze	Total
1	China*	4	0	1	5
2	Poland	3	1	1	5
3	Italy	2	2	3	7
4	Hungary	1	1	0	2
5	Individual Neutral Athletes	0	2	0	2
6	Colombia	0	1	1	2
6	Denmark	0	1	1	2
6	France	0	1	1	2
9	Cuba	0	1	0	1
10	Croatia	0	0	2	2
Totals (10 entries)		10	10	10	30

== Medalists ==
=== Freediving ===
Event	Gold	Silver	Bronze
Men's dynamic with fins	Mateusz Malina; Poland	Alexey Molchanov; Individual Neutral Athletes	Mauro Generali; Italy
Men's dynamic no fins	Mateusz Malina; Poland	Rolando Salgado; Cuba	Vanja Peleš; Croatia
Women's dynamic with fins	Zsófia Törőcsik; Hungary	Julia Kozerska; Poland	Mirela Kardašević; Croatia
Women's dynamic no fins	Julia Kozerska; Poland	Zsófia Törőcsik; Hungary	Magdalena Solich-Talanda; Poland

=== Freediving for athletes with impairment ===
Event	Gold	Silver	Bronze
Men's dynamic with fins FFS1-FFS2	Long Dengxi; China	Casper Marti-Beckmann; Denmark	Alexandre Boscari; France
Men's dynamic no fins FFS1-FFS2	Long Dengxi; China	Alexandre Boscari; France	Casper Marti-Beckmann; Denmark
Men's dynamic no fins FFS3-FFS4	Alessandro Cianfoni; Italy	Alexander Kusakin; Individual Neutral Athletes	Fabrizio Pagani; Italy
Women's dynamic with fins FFS1-FFS2	Huang Shiyu; China	Marta Pozzi; Italy	María Rodríguez Angarita; Colombia
Women's dynamic no fins FFS1-FFS2	Huang Jingqiu; China	María Rodríguez Angarita; Colombia	Marta Pozzi; Italy
Women's dynamic no fins FFS3-FFS4	Ilenia Colanero; Italy	Katia Aere; Italy	Kong Tianci; China
