= Road speed skating at the 2025 World Games =

- Venue: Chengdu Roller Sports Centre
- Dates: 12–13 August 2025
- No. of events: 8
- Competitors: 60 from 25 nations

The road speed skating competition at the 2025 World Games took place from 12 to 13 August 2025 at the Chengdu Roller Sports Centre in Chengdu, China. The discipline included eight events (four for men and four for women).

== Qualification ==
A total of fifteen skaters qualified for each event. Aside for the spot designated to the host nation, the remaining fourteen skaters qualified through the 2024 Inline Speed Skating World Championships.

== Participating nations ==
- Austria (1)
- Belgium (2)
- Brazil (1)
- Chile (4)
- China (4)
- Chinese Taipei (3)
- Colombia (4)
- Czech Republic (2)
- Ecuador (4)
- El Salvador (1)
- France (4)
- Germany (4)
- Guatemala (2)
- Hungary (1)
- India (2)
- Italy (4)
- Mexico (2)
- Netherlands (1)
- New Zealand (1)
- Paraguay (1)
- Portugal (2)
- South Korea (2)
- Spain (3)
- Switzerland (2)
- United States (1)
- Venezuela (2)

== Medal table ==
* Host nation (China)

Rank	Nation	Gold	Silver	Bronze	Total
1	Colombia	3	2	0	5
2	Spain	3	0	0	3
3	France	1	2	3	6
4	El Salvador	1	0	0	1
5	Ecuador	0	1	1	2
6	Belgium	0	1	0	1
6	Italy	0	1	0	1
6	Paraguay	0	1	0	1
9	Germany	0	0	2	2
10	Guatemala	0	0	1	1
10	Mexico	0	0	1	1
Totals (11 entries)		8	8	8	24

== Medalists ==
=== Men ===
Event	Gold	Silver	Bronze
100 m sprint	Jhoan Guzmán; Spain	Vincenzo Maiorca; Italy	Ron Pucklitzsch; Germany
1 lap	Jhoan Guzmán; Spain	Jhon Tascon; Colombia	Yvan Sivilier; France
10,000 m point race	Francisco Peula; Spain	Julio Mirena; Paraguay	Martin Ferrié; France
15,000 m elimination race	Juan Mantilla; Colombia	Nicolás García; Ecuador	Martin Ferrié; France

=== Women ===
Event	Gold	Silver	Bronze
100 m sprint	Ivonne Nóchez; El Salvador	Haila Brunet; France	Dalia Soberanis; Guatemala
1 lap	María Fernanda Timms; Colombia	Fran Vanhoutte; Belgium	Laethisia Schimek; Germany
10,000 m point race	Marine Lefeuvre; France	Gabriela Rueda; Colombia	Gabriela Vargas; Ecuador
15,000 m elimination race	Gabriela Rueda; Colombia	Marine Lefeuvre; France	Valentina Letelier; Mexico
