= Cuba at the 2022 World Games =

- IOC code: CUB
- NOC: Cuban Olympic Committee

in Birmingham, United States 7 July 2022 – 17 July 2022
- Competitors: 1 (1 woman) in 2 sports and 5 events
- Medals: Gold 0 Silver 0 Bronze 0 Total 0

World Games appearances
- 1981; 1985; 1989; 1993; 1997; 2001; 2005; 2009; 2013; 2017; 2022; 2025

Cuba competed at the 2022 World Games held in Birmingham, United States from 7 to 17 July 2022.

== Competitors ==
The following is the list of number of competitors in the Games.

Sport	Men	Women	Total
Road speed skating Track speed skating	0	1	1
Total	0	1	1

== Road speed skating ==
Adriana Cantillo Tundidor was scheduled to compete in the women's 1 lap and women's 100 metres sprint events. She did not start in either event.

== Track speed skating ==
Adriana Cantillo Tundidor competed in track speed skating.
