= Archery at the 2025 World Games – Men's individual barebow =

Men's individual barebow at the 2025 World Games
- Venue: Qinglong Lake, Chengdu, China
- Dates: 14–16 August
- Competitors: 12 from 11 nations

Medalists
gold medal	Simone Barbieri	Italy
silver medal	Simon Fairweather	Australia
bronze medal	Cesar Vera	Spain

The men's individual barebow archery competition at the 2025 World Games took place from 14 to 16 August 2025 at the Qinglong Lake in Chengdu, China.

== Competition format ==
A total of 12 athletes entered the competition. Ranking round was held to determine seeding. Athletes competed in single-elimination tournament.

== Results ==
=== Ranking round ===
Rank	Archer	Nation	Score	6s	5s
1	Simone Barbieri	Italy	371	30	24
2	Erik Jonsson	Sweden	343	17	31
3	Simon Fairweather	Australia	340	21	18
4	Michael Meyer	Germany	340	16	25
5	Cesar Vera	Spain	333	17	22
6	David Jackson	France	332	17	21
7	Ryan Davis	United States	324	12	22
8	Wang Lei	China	323	13	27
9	Chris Kent-Rodgman	Canada	318	11	25
10	David García	Spain	316	15	27
11	James Annall	Great Britain	310	16	21
12	József Molnár	Hungary	303	9	16

=== Elimination round ===
Pool A

Match 1

Match 2
David García (ESP)	75
James Annall (GBR)	58

Match 3
David García (ESP)	71
Ryan Davis (USA)	75

Match 4
Ryan Davis (USA)	70
Simon Fairweather (AUS)	73

Pool B

Match 1
József Molnár (HUN)	82
Chris Kent-Rodgman (CAN)	79

Match 2
József Molnár (HUN)	73
Wang Lei (CHN)	82

Match 3
Wang Lei (CHN)	78
Cesar Vera (ESP)	78

Match 4
Cesar Vera (ESP)	82
Michael Meyer (GER)	78

=== Finals ===
Semi-finals
Erik Jonsson (SWE)	48
Simon Fairweather (AUS)	49
Cesar Vera (ESP)	47
Simone Barbieri (ITA)	55

Gold medal match
Simon Fairweather (AUS)	54
Simone Barbieri (ITA)	54
Bronze medal match
Erik Jonsson (SWE)	40
Cesar Vera (ESP)	55
