= 2024 European Indoor Archery Championships =

International archery competition

- Location: Croatia, Varaždin
- Start date: 19 February
- End date: 24 February
- Competitors: 231 from 24 nations

The 2024 European Indoor Archery Championships was the 20th edition of the European Indoor Archery Championships. The event was held in Varaždin, Croatia from 19 to 24 February 2024. A maximum number of three (3) athletes per country can be registered into each category and divisions of the event. This Competition was organized following the WA and WAE competition rules in divisions Recurve, Compound and Barebow with both age categories of Senior Men and Women and Under 21 Men and Women.

== Competition schedule ==
All times are (UTC+1)

Date	Time	Event
20 February	09:30-12:30	Qualification Round - CM & CW & BM & BW
20 February	14:30-17:30	Qualification Round - RM & RW & BU21M & BU21W
21 February	09:30-13:00	Individual Matches
21 February	14:30-17:30	Individual Matches
22 February	09:00-13:00	Individual Matches
22 February	14:30-18:00	Team Matches
23 February	09:30-12:25	Team Matches Bronze & Gold Finals
23 February	14:50-18:55	Team Matches Bronze & Gold Finals
24 February	09:00-12:55	Individual Matches Bronze & Gold Finals
24 February	14:00-17:45	Individual Matches Bronze & Gold Finals

== Medals table ==
* Host nation (Croatia)

Rank	Nation	Gold	Silver	Bronze	Total
1	Italy	6	8	5	19
2	Ukraine	5	2	2	9
3	Israel	3	3	0	6
4	Great Britain	3	1	2	6
5	Turkey	2	1	1	4
6	Iceland	1	2	2	5
7	Slovenia	1	1	0	2
8	Denmark	1	0	0	1
8	San Marino	1	0	0	1
8	Sweden	1	0	0	1
11	Croatia*	0	3	1	4
12	France	0	1	3	4
13	Romania	0	1	0	1
14	Moldova	0	0	2	2
14	Serbia	0	0	2	2
16	Belgium	0	0	1	1
16	Georgia	0	0	1	1
Totals (17 entries)		24	23	22	69

== Medal summary ==
=== Recurve ===
Event	Gold	Silver	Bronze
Men's individual	(Italy) Mauro Nespoli	(Israel) Itay Shanny	(Ukraine) Mykhailo Usach
Women's individual	(Italy) Tatiana Andreoli	(Ukraine) Anastasia Pavlova	(Italy) Lucilla Boari
Men's team	Ukraine; Ivan Kozhokar; Viktor Ruban; Mykhailo Usach	Italy; Matteo Borsani; Mauro Nespoli; Alessandro Paoli	Croatia; Lovro Cerni; Adam Gradiscak; Alen Remar
Women's team	Ukraine; Solomiya Hnyp; Anastasia Pavlova; Iryna Tretiakova	Italy; Tatiana Andreoli; Lucilla Boari; Chiara Rebagliati	Moldova; Nadejda Celan; Alexandra Mîrca; Varvara Tisliuc
U-21 Men's individual	(Israel) Roy Dror	(Israel) Niv Frenkel	(Georgia (country)) Aleksandre Machavariani
U-21 Women's individual	(Ukraine) Dzvenyslava Chernyk	(Slovenia) Žana Pintarič	(Italy) Ginevra Landi
U-21 Men's team	Israel; Roy Dror; Niv Frenkel; Ori Yosef Rozmarin Berlad	Ukraine; Oleh Drabik; Ivan Romaniuk; Kostiantyn Vaksman	Belgium; Arne Collas; Feel Stinkens; Wout van Dun
U-21 Women's team	Ukraine; Olha Chebotarenko; Dzvenyslava Chernyk; Daria Koval	Italy; Chiara Compagno; Ginevra Landi; Lucia Mosna	Moldova; Kasandra Berzan; Nicoleta Clima; Nikoli Streapunina

=== Compound ===
Event	Gold	Silver	Bronze
Men's individual	(Israel) Shamai Yamrom	(France) Adrien Gontier	(France) Nicolas Girard
Women's individual	(Italy) Elisa Roner	(Italy) Andrea Nicole Moccia	(United Kingdom) Ella Gibson
Men's team	Denmark; Tore Bjarnarson; Martin Damsbo; Mathias Fullerton	Croatia; Domagoj Buden; Matija Mihalic; Mario Vavro	Italy; Marco Bruno; Valerio Della Stua; Michea Godano
Women's team	Great Britain; Grace Chappell; Ella Gibson; Patience Wood	Italy; Andrea Nicole Moccia; Elisa Roner; Marcella Tonioli	Iceland; Anna Maria Alfredsdottir; Matthildur Magnusdottir; Ewa Ploszaj
U-21 Men's individual	(Ukraine) Vitalii Vdovenko	(Israel) Yiftach Hadar	(Turkey) Yağız Sezgin
U-21 Women's individual	(Turkey) Hazal Burun	(Turkey) Hatice Efdal Köse	(France) Lea Girault
U-21 Men's team	Italy; Fabrizio Aloisi; Lorenzo Gubbini; Andrea Marchetti	Croatia; Mihael Curic; Nikola Portner Pavićević; Mihovil Srebren	Ukraine; Sviatoslav Karpenko; Daniil Nedelko; Vitalii Vdovenko
U-21 Women's team	Turkey; Hazal Burun; Hatice Efdal Köse; Helin Satıcı	Great Britain; Chloe A'Bear; Grace Coulam; Mia McGuane	Italy; Martina Del Duca; Giulia Di Nardo; Martina Serafini

=== Barebow ===
Event	Gold	Silver	Bronze
Men's individual	(Slovenia) Gregor Dolar	(Italy) Giuseppe Seimandi	(Italy) Simone Barbieri
Women's individual	(San Marino) Kristina Maria Pruccoli	(Italy) Cinzia Noziglia	(France) Lisa Andre
Men's team	Italy; Simone Barbieri; Valter Basteri; Giuseppe Seimandi	Croatia; Goran Curic; Dario Marosevic; Zoran Velagic	Serbia; Dragoljub Majovic; Srdjan Pilipovic; Dejan Stojanovic
Women's team	Italy; Alessandra Bigogno; Cinzia Noziglia; Fabia Rovatti	Romania; Florentina Cristina Bacin; Maria Loredana Mogos; Elena Topliceanu	Serbia; Natasa Stojkovic; Ingrid Vasiljevic; Katarina Vranjkovic
U-21 Men's individual	(Sweden) Ludvig Rohlin	(Italy) Giulio Locchi	(Iceland) Baldur Freyr Arnason
U-21 Women's individual	(United Kingdom) Isabel Plowman	(Iceland) Loa Margret Hauksdottir	(United Kingdom) Evie Finnegan
U-21 Men's team	Iceland; Baldur Freyr Arnason; Audunn Andri Johannesson; Ragnar Smari Jónasson	Only 1 team	
U-21 Women's team	Great Britain; Evie Finnegan; Isabel Plowman; Emily Summers	Iceland; Loa Margret Hauksdottir; Maria Kozak; Heba Robertsdottir	Only 2 teams

== Participating nations ==
231 archers from 24 countries:

1. Austria (3)
2. Belgium (5)
3. Bulgaria (7)
4. Croatia (22) (Host)
5. Czech Republic (1)
6. Denmark (5)
7. France (6)
8. Faroe Islands (4)
9. United Kingdom (14)
10. Georgia (4)
11. Hungary (1)
12. Iceland (34)
13. Israel (13)
14. Italy (32)
15. Moldova (10)
16. Portugal (5)
17. Romania (9)
18. Slovenia (4)
19. San Marino (1)
20. Serbia (10)
21. Slovakia (15)
22. Sweden (4)
23. Turkey (7)
24. Ukraine (15)
