= Cuba at the 2025 World Games =

- IOC code: CUB
- NOC: Cuban Olympic Committee

in Chengdu, China 7 August 2025 – 17 August 2025
- Competitors: 1 (1 man and 0 women) in 1 sport and 2 events
- Medals Ranked 71st: Gold 0 Silver 1 Bronze 0 Total 1

World Games appearances
- 1981; 1985; 1989; 1993; 1997; 2001; 2005; 2009; 2013; 2017; 2022; 2025

Cuba competed at the 2025 World Games held in Chengdu, China from 7 to 17 August 2025.

Only one athlete represented Cuba at this Games. Freediver Rolando Salgado won the first ever World Games medal for the country, which is one silver medal. The country finished in 71st place in the medal table.

== Medalists ==
Medal	Name	Sport	Event	Date
Silver	Rolando Salgado Martinez	Freediving	Men's dynamic no fins	10 August

== Competitors ==
The following is the list of number of competitors in the Games.

Sport	Men	Women	Total
Freediving	1	0	1
Total	1	0	1
