= Kickboxing at the 2025 World Games – Men's point fighting 63 kg =

Men's point fighting 63 kg at the 2025 World Games
- Venue: Sichuan Provincial Gymnasium
- Location: Chengdu, China
- Dates: 12–14 August 2025
- Competitors: 8 from 8 nations

Medalists
gold medal	Roland Veres	Hungary
silver medal	Gabriele Lanzilao	Italy
bronze medal	Borislav Radulov	Bulgaria

The men's point fighting 63 kg competition in kickboxing at the 2025 World Games will take place from 12 to 14 August 2025 at the Sichuan Provincial Gymnasium in Chengdu, China.

== Competition format ==
A total of 8 athletes entered the competition. They fought in the cup system.

== Results ==
Quarterfinals
Roland Veres (HUN)	11
Sergey Kosolapov (UZB)	1
Kevin Eduardo Cordoba (CHI)	1
Roland Viczian (GER)	1
Gabriele Lanzilao (ITA)	9
Raul Campuzano (MEX)	3
Ahmad Mahomed (RSA)	5
Borislav Radulov (BUL)	15

Semifinals
Roland Veres (HUN)	15
Roland Viczian (GER)	5
Gabriele Lanzilao (ITA)	12
Borislav Radulov (BUL)	11

Final
Roland Veres (HUN)	14
Gabriele Lanzilao (ITA)	11

Third place
Roland Viczian (GER)	9
Borislav Radulov (BUL)	19
