= Cheerleading at the 2025 World Games =

- Venue: Dong'an Lake Sports Park Gymnasium
- Dates: 15–16 August 2025
- No. of events: 1
- Competitors: 11 teams from 11 nations

The cheerleading competition at the 2025 World Games took place from 15 to 16 August 2025 at the Dong'an Lake Sports Park Gymnasium in Chengdu, China. The competition was one of the disciplines introduced for the 2025 World Games. It had one team event.

== Qualification ==
A total of eleven teams qualified:

Event	Location	Dates	Total places	Qualified NOCs
Mixed pom doubles– 11 teams
Host nation	—	—	2	China
2024 ICU European; Cheerleading Championships	(Norway) Oslofjord	28–30 June 2024	1	Ukraine
2024 ICU Asian; Cheerleading Championships	(Indonesia) Bali	13–15 September 2024	1	Japan
2024 ICU Pan American; Cheerleading Championships	(Canada) Ottawa	27–30 September 2024	1	Mexico
2024 The World Games; Series	Hong Kong	11–13 October 2024	1	United States
Worldwide global video submission	—	From 1 April 2025	2	Croatia; Finland
2024 ICU World; Cheerleading Championships	(United States) Orlando	23–25 April 2025	3	Ecuador; Australia; Great Britain

== Medal table ==
* Host nation (China)

Rank	Nation	Gold	Silver	Bronze	Total
1	United States	1	0	0	1
2	Ecuador	0	1	0	1
3	Australia	0	0	1	1
Totals (3 entries)		1	1	1	3

== Medalists ==
Event	Gold	Silver	Bronze
Mixed pom	United States (USA); Sydney Martin; Allison Hoeft	Ecuador (ECU); Jennifer García; Fabiana Vélez	Australia (AUS); Shayla Myerscough; Emily Growdon
