= Duathlon at the 2025 World Games =

- Venue: Xinglong Lake
- Dates: 14–17 August
- No. of events: 3
- Competitors: 63 from 24 nations

The duathlon competition at the 2025 World Games took place from 14 to 17 August 2025, in Chengdu in China, at the Xinglong Lake. The competition included three events (men, women and mixed).

== Qualification ==
A total of 40 male duathletes and 36 female qualified for the events through various continental championships.

== Participating nations ==
- Australia (2)
- Belgium (6)
- Cambodia (1)
- China (3)
- Colombia (2)
- Czech Republic (1)
- France (3)
- Germany (4)
- Iran (6)
- Japan (6)
- Kosovo (1)
- Mexico (4)
- Mongolia (1)
- Morocco (1)
- Netherlands (3)
- Panama (1)
- Philippines (6)
- Portugal (1)
- Saudi Arabia (1)
- Singapore (3)
- Slovakia (2)
- Spain (2)
- United Arab Emirates (1)
- Venezuela (2)

== Medal table ==
* Host nation (China)

Rank	Nation	Gold	Silver	Bronze	Total
1	Spain	1	1	0	2
2	France	1	0	0	1
2	Mexico	1	0	0	1
4	Belgium	0	1	3	4
5	Netherlands	0	1	0	1
Totals (5 entries)		3	3	3	9

== Medalists ==
=== Men ===
Event	Gold	Silver	Bronze
Individual	Benjamin Choquert; France	Arnaud Dely; Belgium	Vincent Bierinckx; Belgium

=== Women ===
Event	Gold	Silver	Bronze
Individual	Anahí Álvarez; Mexico	María Varo; Spain	Jeanne Dupont; Belgium

=== Mixed ===
Event	Gold	Silver	Bronze
Mixed relay	Spain 1 María Varo; Javier Martín Morales	Netherlands 1 Aline Kootstra; Valentin van Wersch	Belgium 1 Jeanne Dupont; Arnaud Dely
