= Flying disc at the 2025 World Games =

- Venue: Chengdu Sport University Sancha Lake Campus; Guixi Park
- Dates: 8–10 August 2025 (Disc golf); 12–16 August 2025 (Ultimate)
- No. of events: 2
- Competitors: 24 teams from 17 nations

The flying disc competition at the 2025 World Games took place from 8 to 16 August 2025 in Chengdu, China. The ultimate event took place at the Chengdu Sport University Sancha Lake Campus while the disc golf was held at Guixi Park.

== Qualification ==
The total of qualified teams for the events are sixteen for disc golf and eight for ultimate. The qualification was based on the WFDF World Rankings.

Event	Location	Dates	Total places	Qualified NOCs
Disc golf – 16 teams
Host nation	—N/a	—N/a	1	China
WFDF World Rankings	—N/a	—N/a	15	Australia; Austria; Canada; Czech Republic; Estonia; Finland; France; Germany; Great Britain; Japan; Latvia; Lithuania (Note: Lithuania replaced New Zealand (refused participation)); Norway; Slovakia; United States
Ultimate – 8 teams
Host nation	—N/a	—N/a	1	China
WFDF World Rankings	—N/a	—N/a	7	Australia; Canada; Colombia; France; Germany; Japan; United States

== Medal table ==
* Host nation (China)

Rank	Nation	Gold	Silver	Bronze	Total
1	United States	2	0	0	2
2	Canada	0	1	0	1
2	Latvia	0	1	0	1
4	Finland	0	0	1	1
4	France	0	0	1	1
Totals (5 entries)		2	2	2	6

== Events ==
=== Mixed ===
Event	Gold	Silver	Bronze
Disc golf	United States; Gannon Buhr; Missy Gannon	Finland; Nestori Tuhkanen; Eveliina Salonen	Latvia; Rainers Balodis; Elizabete Peksena
Ultimate	United States (USA); Marques Brownlee; Claire Chastain; Dawn Culton; Carolyn Finney; Dylan Freechild; Kameryn Groom; Raphael Hayes; Kaela Helton; Christopher Kocher; Henry Ing; Grant Lindsley; Anna Thompson; Claire Trop	Canada (CAN); Malik Auger-Semmar; Anouchka Beaudry; Malcolm Bryson; Gagandeep Chatha; Florence Dionne; Brittney dos Santos; Thomas Edmonds; Sarah Beth Jacobson; Lauren Kimura; Mika Kurahashi; Mark Lloyd; Martin-Leo Savoie-Gallant; Quinn Snider; Molly Wedge	France (FRA); Gael Ancelin; Paul Benvegnen; Camille Blanc; Elliot Bonnet; Lison Bornot; Zoe Forget; Tifaine Latchy; Chloe Ollivier; Sacha Poitte-Sokolsky; Salome Raulet; Sullivan Roblet; Simon Ruelle; Leo Stanguennec; Chloe Vallet
