= Nigeria at the 2025 World Games =

- IOC code: NGR
- NOC: Nigeria Olympic Committee

in Chengdu, China 7 August 2025 – 17 August 2025
- Competitors: 1 (1 man and 0 women) in 1 sport and 1 event

World Games appearances
- 1981; 1985; 1989; 1993; 1997; 2001; 2005; 2009; 2013; 2017; 2022; 2025

Nigeria will compete at the 2025 World Games held in Chengdu, China from 7 to 17 August 2025.

== Competitors ==
The following is the list of number of competitors in the Games.

Sport	Men	Women	Total
Squash	1	0	1
Total	1	0	1

== Squash ==
Athlete	Event	Round of 32	Round of 16 / CR	Quarterfinals / CQ	Semi-finals / CS	Final / BM / CF	
Athlete	Event	Opposition Score	Opposition Score	Opposition Score	Opposition Score	Opposition Score	Rank
Onaopemipo Adegoke	Men's singles	Lau (HKG); L 3–1	Classification round Zhou (CHN); W 3–0	Classification round Zhang (CHN); W 3–0	Classification round Solnicky (CZE); W 2–3	Classification final Gaeano (COL); L 0–3	18
