= Croatia at the 2025 World Games =

- IOC code: CRO
- NOC: Croatian Olympic Committee

in Chengdu, China 7 August 2025 – 17 August 2025
- Competitors: 40 (21 men and 19 women) in 10 sports and 22 events
- Medals Ranked 59th: Gold 0 Silver 2 Bronze 3 Total 5

World Games appearances
- 1981; 1985; 1989; 1993; 1997; 2001; 2005; 2009; 2013; 2017; 2022; 2025

Croatia competed at the 2025 World Games held in Chengdu, China from 7 to 17 August 2025.

Athletes representing Croatia won two silver medals and three bronze medals. The country finished in 59th place in the medal table.

== Medalists ==
| Medal | Name | Sport | Event | Date |
|---|---|---|---|---|
| Silver | Ivan Kvesić | Karate | Men's kumite 84 kg | 9 August |
| Silver | Anđelo Kvesić | Karate | Men's kumite +84 kg | 9 August |
| Bronze | Ema Sgardelli | Karate | Women's kumite 50 kg | 8 August |
| Bronze | Vanja Peleš | Freediving | Men's dynamic no fins | 10 August |
| Bronze | Mirela Kardašević | Freediving | Women's dynamic with fins | 11 August |

== Competitors ==
The following is the list of number of competitors in the Games.

| Sport | Men | Women | Total |
|---|---|---|---|
| Archery | 1 | 1 | 2 |
| Boules sports | 1 | 1 | 2 |
| Cheerleading | 0 | 2 | 2 |
| Handball | 10 | 10 | 20 |
| Karate | 2 | 1 | 3 |
| Muaythai | 1 | 0 | 1 |
| Sambo | 1 | 1 | 2 |
| Squash | 2 | 1 | 3 |
| Underwater sports | 2 | 2 | 4 |
| Wakeboarding | 1 | 0 | 1 |
| Total | 21 | 19 | 40 |

== Beach handball ==
| Team | Event | Preliminary round | | | | Quarterfinal | Semifinal | Final / BM / PM | |
| Team | Event | Opposition Result | Opposition Result | Opposition Result | Rank | Opposition Result | Opposition Result | Opposition Result | Rank |
|---|---|---|---|---|---|---|---|---|---|
| Croatia men's | Men's tournament | Germany; L 1–2 | Brazil; L 2–0 | Portugal; L 0–2 | 4 | Spain; L 2–0 | Consolation semifinal Tunisia; W 2–0 | 5th place game Denmark; W 2–1 | 5 |
| Croatia women's | Women's tournament | China; L 2–1 | Argentina; L 0–2 | Portugal; W 0–2 | 3 | Denmark; L 0–2 | Consolation semifinal China; L 2–0 | 7th place game Vietnam; W 1–2 | 7 |

== Squash ==
| Athlete | Event | Round of 32 | Round of 16 / CR | Quarterfinals / CQ | Semi-finals / CS | Final / BM / CF | |
| Athlete | Event | Opposition Score | Opposition Score | Opposition Score | Opposition Score | Opposition Score | Rank |
|---|---|---|---|---|---|---|---|
| Martin Kegel | Men's singles | Tsukue (JPN); L 0–3 | Bye | Classification round Solnicky (CZE); L 1–3 | Did not advance | | =21 |
| Franka Vidović | Women's singles | Bushma (UKR); W 3–2 | Beinhard (GER); L 3–2 | Classification round Tyma (POL); W 2–3 | Classification round Ward (RSA); W 3–2 | Classification Final; Chukwu (HUN); L 3–0 | 10 |
