= Mirela Kardašević =

Croatian female freediver

Mirela Kardašević is a Croatian female freediver and current world record holder.

== Career ==
At the 2024 World Championships in Athens, she set a world record in the monofin dynamic discipline (284 m).

She won bronze medal in dynamic with fins at the 2025 World Games in Chengdu.

At the 2026 World Championships in Novi Sad, she set a world record in the bifin dynamic discipline (278.5 m), swimming 15 m more than the previous record. She also won gold in the monofin dynamic discipline and silver in the finless dynamic discipline, thus winning three medals in three appearances.

== Awards ==
In 2022, she won the Croatian Olympic Committee's Award for outstanding results in non-Olympic sports and disciplines.
