= Kacper Majchrzak =

Polish swimmer (born 1992)

Personal information
- National team: Poland
- Born: 22 September 1992 (age 33) Poznań, Greater Poland, Poland
- Height: 1.90 m (6 ft 3 in)
- Weight: 88 kg (194 lb)

Sport
- Sport: Swimming
- Strokes: Freestyle
- Club: Cali Condors
Medal record
Representing Poland
Men's swimming
European Championships (LC)
Bronze medal – third place	2018 Glasgow	4×100 m freestyle
Summer Universiade
Silver medal – second place	2017 Taipei	100 m freestyle
Silver medal – second place	2017 Taipei	200 m freestyle
Military World Games
Bronze medal – third place	2019 Wuhan	100 m freestyle
Bronze medal – third place	2019 Wuhan	200 m freestyle
Bronze medal – third place	2019 Wuhan	4×200 m freestyle
Bronze medal – third place	2019 Wuhan	4×100 m medley
Men's lifesaving
World Games
Gold medal – first place	2025 Chengdu	100 m rescue medley
Silver medal – second place	2025 Chengdu	50 m manikin carry
Silver medal – second place	2025 Chengdu	4x25 m manikin
World Championships
Gold medal – first place	2024 Gold Coast	200 m obstacle
Gold medal – first place	2024 Gold Coast	4×50 m obstacle

Kacper Majchrzak (born 22 September 1992) is a Polish swimmer. He currently represents the Cali Condors which is part of the International Swimming League. Majchrzak competed in the 50 m freestyle and 4 × 100m medley relay events at the 2012 Summer Olympics. He finished 10th in the 200 metre freestyle at the 2016 Summer Olympics setting a new national record of 1:46.30.

== Career ==
=== International Swimming League ===
In 2019, he was a member of the inaugural International Swimming League representing the Cali Condors, who finished third place in the final match in Las Vegas, Nevada in December. Majchrzak competed in the 100 meter and 200 meter freestyle events as well as all 3 relay events throughout the season.
