= Poland at the 2025 World Games =

- IOC code: POL
- NOC: Polish Olympic Committee

in Chengdu, China 7 August 2025 – 17 August 2025
- Competitors: 64 (40 men and 24 women) in 15 sports and 46 events
- Medals Ranked 12th: Gold 6 Silver 6 Bronze 2 Total 14

World Games appearances
- 1981; 1985; 1989; 1993; 1997; 2001; 2005; 2009; 2013; 2017; 2022; 2025

Poland competed at the 2025 World Games held in Chengdu, China from 7 to 17 August 2025. Athletes representing Poland won six gold medals, six silver medals and two bronze medals. The country finished in 12th place in the medal table.

== Medalists ==
| Medal | Name | Sport | Event | Date |
|---|---|---|---|---|
| Gold | Kacper Majchrzak | Lifesaving | Men's 100 metres rescue medley | 8 August |
| Gold | Julia Kozerska | Freediving | Women's dynamic no fins | 10 August |
| Gold | Mateusz Malina | Freediving | Men's dynamic no fins | 10 August |
| Gold | Szymon Kropidłowski | Finswimming | Men's 100 metre bi-fins | 10 August |
| Gold | Mateusz Malina | Freediving | Men's dynamic with fins | 11 August |
| Gold | Zuzanna Kula | Powerlifting | Women's equipped lightweight | 16 August |
| Silver | Kacper Majchrzak | Lifesaving | Men's 50 metres manikin carry | 9 August |
| Silver | Adam Dubiel; Mateusz Grabski; Wojciech Kotowski; Kacper Majchrzak | Lifesaving | Men's 4x25-metres manikin relay | 9 August |
| Silver | Martyna Kierczyńska | Muaythai | Women's 54 kg | 10 August |
| Silver | Julia Kozerska | Freediving | Women's dynamic with fins | 11 August |
| Silver | Szymon Kropidłowski | Finswimming | Men's 50 metre bi-fins | 11 August |
| Silver | Arkadiusz Janora; Rozalia Janora | Powerboating | Mixed Nations Cup | 17 August |
| Bronze | Dariusz Mycka; Madara Freiberga | Dancesport | Standard | 9 August |
| Bronze | Magdalena Solich-Talanda | Freediving | Women's dynamic no fins | 10 August |

Medals by sport
| Sport | 1st place, gold medalist(s) | 2nd place, silver medalist(s) | 3rd place, bronze medalist(s) | Total |
| Freediving | 3 | 1 | 1 | 5 |
| Lifesaving | 1 | 2 | 0 | 3 |
| Finswimming | 1 | 1 | 0 | 2 |
| Powerlifting | 1 | 0 | 0 | 1 |
| Muaythai | 0 | 1 | 0 | 1 |
| Powerboating | 0 | 1 | 0 | 1 |
| Dancesport | 0 | 0 | 1 | 1 |
| Total | 6 | 6 | 2 | 14 |

== Competitors ==
The following is the list of number of competitors in the Games.

| Sport | Men | Women | Total |
|---|---|---|---|
| Air sports | 1 | 0 | 1 |
| Billards | 2 | 0 | 2 |
| Canoe marathon | 2 | 0 | 2 |
| Canoe polo | 8 | 0 | 8 |
| Dancesport | 4 | 3 | 7 |
| Finswimming | 2 | 0 | 2 |
| Freediving | 1 | 2 | 3 |
| Kickboxing | 1 | 0 | 1 |
| Korfball | 6 | 0 | 6 |
| Lifesaving | 13 | 12 | 25 |
| Muaythai | 0 | 2 | 2 |
| Orienteering | 6 | 6 | 12 |
| Powerboating | 1 | 1 | 2 |
| Powerlifting | 1 | 2 | 3 |
| Sport climbing | 0 | 5 | 5 |
| Squash | 1 | 2 | 3 |
| Wakeboarding | 1 | 1 | 2 |
| Total | 24 | 40 | 64 |

== Korfball ==
Beach

Poland qualified in beach korfball at the 2024 World Beach Korfball Championship.

| Athlete | Event | Group stage | | | | Quarterfinal | Semi-final | Final / BM | |
| Athlete | Event | Opposition Score | Opposition Score | Opposition Score | Rank | Opposition Score | Opposition Score | Opposition Score | Rank |
|---|---|---|---|---|---|---|---|---|---|
| Team Poland | Beach Korfball | Belgium; L 6-16 | Australia; W 16-3 | Netherlands; L 5-16 | 3 | Hungary; L 8–7 | United States; W 8-12 | China; W 6-10 | 5 |

== Powerlifting ==
Equipped

| Athlete | Event | Exercises | | | Total weight | Total points | Rank |
| Athlete | Event | Squat | Bench press | Deadlift | Total weight | Total points | Rank |
|---|---|---|---|---|---|---|---|
| Zuzanna Kula | Women's lightweight | 223.0 WR | 155.0 | 185.0 | 563.0 | 114.81 | (gold) WR |
| Jaroslaw Olech | Men's middleweight | DSQ | | | | | |

== Squash ==
| Athlete | Event | Round of 32 | Round of 16 / CR | Quarterfinals / CQ | Semi-finals / CS | Final / BM / CF | |
| Athlete | Event | Opposition Score | Opposition Score | Opposition Score | Opposition Score | Opposition Score | Rank |
|---|---|---|---|---|---|---|---|
| Leon Krysiak | Men's singles | Wilhelmi (SUI); L 1–3 | Classification round Solnicky (CZE); L 3–0 | Bye | Consolation round Zhou (CHN); W 3–0 | Consolation Final; Shcherbakov (UKR); L 1–3 | 26 |
| Tola Otrzasek | Women's singles | Tycova (GER); L 0–3 | Classification round Cheng (CHN); W 0–3 | Classification round Bautista (COL); L 0–3 | Did not advance | | =21 |
| Karina Tyma | Women's singles | Cepova (CZE); W 0–3 | Stephan (FRA); L 3–0 | Classification round Vidovic (CRO); L 2–3 | Did not advance | | =13 |
