= Luxembourg at the 2025 World Games =

- IOC code: LUX
- NOC: Luxembourg Olympic and Sporting Committee

in Chengdu, China 7 August 2025 – 17 August 2025
- Competitors: 2 (0 men and 2 women) in 2 sports and 2 events

World Games appearances
- 1981; 1985; 1989; 1993; 1997; 2001; 2005; 2009; 2013; 2017; 2022; 2025

Luxembourg will compete at the 2025 World Games held in Chengdu, China from 7 to 17 August 2025.

== Competitors ==
The following is the list of number of competitors in the Games.

| Sport | Men | Women | Total |
|---|---|---|---|
| Archery | 0 | 1 | 1 |
| Powerlifting | 0 | 1 | 1 |
| Total | 0 | 2 | 2 |

== Powerlifting ==
Equipped

| Athlete | Event | Exercises | | | Total weight | Total points | Rank |
| Athlete | Event | Squat | Bench press | Deadlift | Total weight | Total points | Rank |
|---|---|---|---|---|---|---|---|
| Ankie Timmers | Women's Super Heavyweight | 172.5 | 207.5 | 175.0 | 555.0 | 87.14 | 7 |
