= Squash at the 2025 World Games =

- Venue: Chengdu Hi-Tech Zone Sports Centre
- Dates: 8–12 August
- No. of events: 2
- Competitors: 63 from 21 nations

The Squash competition at the 2025 World Games took place from 8 to 12 August 2025 in Chengdu, China.

Both the men and women's matches were played in the Public Fitness Gymnasium section of the Chengdu Hi-Tech Zone Sports Centre.

== Qualification ==
32 men and 32 women qualified for the 2025 World Games.

== Participating nations ==
- Australia (2)
- Austria (2)
- China (11)
- Colombia (3)
- Croatia (2)
- Czech Republic (4)
- Egypt (2)
- France (5)
- Germany (3)
- Guatemala (2)
- Hong Kong (4)
- Hungary (2)
- Japan (3)
- Nigeria (1)
- Pakistan (2)
- Poland (3)
- Romania (2)
- South Africa (2)
- Spain (2)
- Switzerland (4)
- Ukraine (2)

== Medal table ==
Rank	Nation	Gold	Silver	Bronze	Total
1	France	1	1	0	2
2	Japan	1	0	0	1
3	Hungary	0	1	0	1
4	Colombia	0	0	1	1
4	Spain	0	0	1	1
Totals (5 entries)		2	2	2	6

== Events ==
Event	Gold	Silver	Bronze
Men's singles	Victor Crouin; France	Balázs Farkas; Hungary	Miguel Ángel Rodríguez; Colombia
Women's singles	Satomi Watanabe; Japan	Marie Stephan; France	Marta Domínguez; Spain
