= Estonia at the 2025 World Games =

- IOC code: EST
- NOC: Estonian Olympic Committee

in Chengdu, China 7 August 2025 – 17 August 2025
- Competitors: 24 (10 men and 14 women) in 6 sports and 8 events
- Medals Ranked 67th: Gold 0 Silver 1 Bronze 1 Total 2

World Games appearances
- 1981; 1985; 1989; 1993; 1997; 2001; 2005; 2009; 2013; 2017; 2022; 2025

Estonia competed at the 2025 World Games held in Chengdu, China from 7 to 17 August 2025.

Athletes representing Estonia won one silver medal and one bronze medal. The country finished in 67th place in the medal table

== Medalists ==
Medal	Name	Sport	Event	Date
Silver	Lisell Jäätma	Archery	Women's individual compound	9 August
Bronze	Meeri-Marita Paas	Archery	Women's individual compound	9 August

== Competitors ==
The following is the list of number of competitors in the Games.

Sport	Men	Women	Total
Archery	0	2	2
Billards	1	0	1
Canoe marathon	0	2	2
Dancesport	2	2	4
Flying disc	7	7	14
Muaythai	0	1	1
Total	10	14	24
