= Simone Barbieri =

Italian archer (born 1992)

Personal information
- Born: 29 November 1992 (age 33)

Sport
- Sport: Archery
- Event: Barebow
Medal record
Men's archery
Representing Italy
World Games
Gold medal – first place	2025 Chengdu	Individual
World Archery 3D Championships
Silver medal – second place	2024 Mokrice (SLO)	Individual
Indoor Archery World Series
Silver medal – second place	Nîmes (FRA) 2024	individual
Bronze medal – third place	Nîmes (FRA) 2025	individual
Gold medal – first place	Nîmes (FRA) 2026	individual
European Indoor Championships
Silver medal – second place	2022 Laško	Team
Bronze medal – third place	2024 Varaždin	Individual
Gold medal – first place	2024 Varaždin	Team
Silver medal – second place	2025 Samsun	Individual
Gold medal – first place	2025 Samsun	Team
Gold medal – first place	2026 Plovdiv	Team
Gold medal – first place	2026 Plovdiv	Mixed Team

Simone Barbieri (born 29 November 1992) is an Italian archer who competes in barebow events.

== Biography ==
Barbieri won the silver medal in the men's team event at the 2022 European Indoor Championships held in Laško, Slovenia. He returned in the 2024 edition as the top seed, winning the bronze medal in the individual event and gold medal in the team event. Later in the year, he won the silver medal in the individual event at the 2024 World Archery 3D Championships. Barbieri entered the 2025 European Indoor Championships, winning the silver medal in the individual event and once again the gold medal in the team event. Several months later, he competed in the 2025 World Games. Having led the standings in the ranking round, he reached the final he won the gold medal in the men's individual event.
