= Chiara Rebagliati =

Italian archer (born 1997)

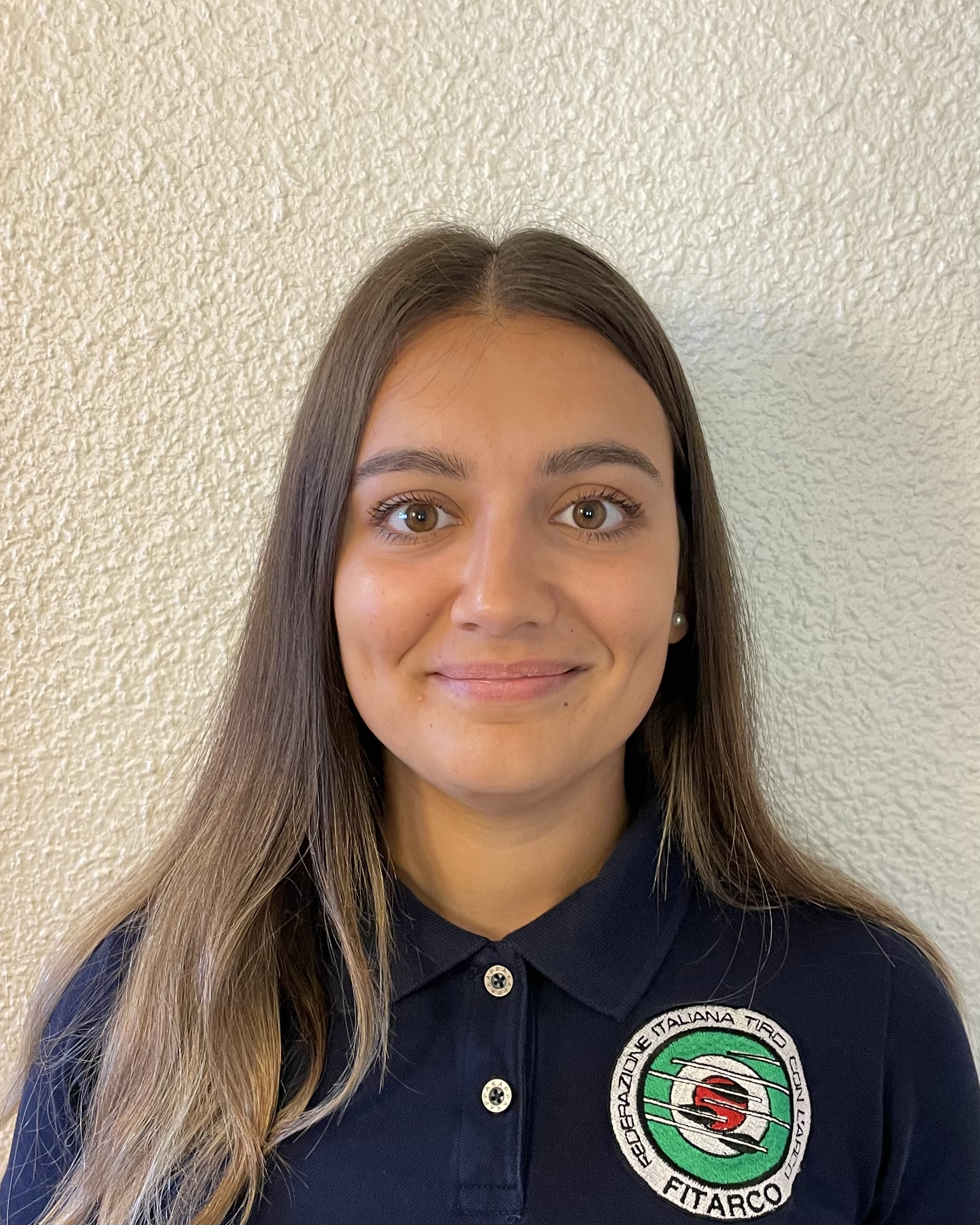

Personal information
- Born: 23 January 1997 (age 29) Savona, Italy

Sport
- Sport: Archery
Medal record
Women's recurve archery
Representing Italy
World Games
Gold medal – first place	2022 Birmingham	Individual
Silver medal – second place	2025 Chengdu	Individual
World Field Championships
Gold medal – first place	2022 Yankton	Individual
Gold medal – first place	2022 Yankton	Team
Gold medal – first place	2022 Yankton	Mixed team
Bronze medal – third place	2024 Lac La Biche	Individual
European Games
Bronze medal – third place	2023 Kraków-Małopolska	Individual
Bronze medal – third place	2023 Kraków-Małopolska	Team
European Championships
Bronze medal – third place	2026 Antalya	Team
European Indoor Championships
Gold medal – first place	2025 Samsun	Team
Silver medal – second place	2024 Varaždin	Team
Mediterranean Games
Silver medal – second place	2022 Oran	Team

Chiara Rebagliati (born 23 January 1997) is an Italian archer. She won the gold medal in the women's recurve event at the 2022 World Games held in Birmingham, Alabama, United States. She competed in the women's individual, women's team and mixed team events at the 2020 Summer Olympics held in Tokyo, Japan. She studied at University of Insubria.

Rebagliati won the silver medal in the women's team event at the 2022 Mediterranean Games held in Oran, Algeria. She also competed in the women's individual event.

She won the silver medal in the women's individual recurve event at the 2025 World Games held in Chengdu, China.
