= Slovenia at the 2025 World Games =

- IOC code: SVN
- NOC: Olympic Committee of Slovenia

in Chengdu, China 7 August 2025 – 17 August 2025
- Competitors: 7 (3 men and 4 women) in 4 sports and 8 events
- Medals Ranked 63rd: Gold 0 Silver 1 Bronze 3 Total 4

World Games appearances
- 1981; 1985; 1989; 1993; 1997; 2001; 2005; 2009; 2013; 2017; 2022; 2025

Slovenia competed at the 2025 World Games held in Chengdu, China from 7 to 17 August 2025.

Athletes representing Slovenia won one silver medal and three bronze medals. The country finished in 63rd place in the medal table.

== Medalists ==
Medal	Name	Sport	Event	Date
Silver	Gasper Povh	Boules sports	Men's lyonnaise progressive	15 August
Bronze	Tyra Barada	Kickboxing	Women's point fighting 50 kg	14 August
Bronze	Tina Baloh	Kickboxing	Women's point fighting 70 kg	14 August
Bronze	Jacqueline Košir	Boules sports	Women's lyonnaise progressive	17 August

== Competitors ==
The following is the list of number of competitors in the Games.

Sport	Men	Women	Total
Archery	1	1	2
Boules sports	1	1	2
Ju-jitsu	1	0	1
Kickboxing	0	2	2
Total	3	4	7
