= Lucrezia Fabretti =

Italian lifesaving athlete

Personal information
- Born: 5 November 2001 (age 24)

Sport
- Country: Italy
- Sport: Lifesaving
Medal record
Women's lifesaving
Representing Italy
World Games
Gold medal – first place	2025 Chengdu	100 m manikin carry with fins
Gold medal – first place	2025 Chengdu	200 m super lifesaver
Bronze medal – third place	2022 Birmingham	4x50 m obstacle
Bronze medal – third place	2022 Birmingham	4x50 m medley
Bronze medal – third place	2025 Chengdu	4x25 m manikin

Lucrezia Fabretti (born 5 November 2001) is an Italian lifesaving athlete. She is the current open and youth world record holder in the 100m manikin carry with fins. She is also a bronze medalist at the 2022 World Games in lifesaving.

== See also ==
- List of world records in life saving
