= Benjamin Choquert =

French runner and duathlete (born 1986)

Personal information
- Born: 17 April 1986 (age 40)

Sport
- Country: France
- Sport: Long-distance running; Cross-country running; Duathlon
Medal record
Representing France
Men's athletics
Mediterranean Games
Silver medal – second place	2022 Oran	Half marathon
Men's duathlon
World Games
Gold medal – first place	2025 Chengdu	Individual
Silver medal – second place	2022 Birmingham	Individual
World Championships
Gold medal – first place	2019 Pontevedra	Elite
Gold medal – first place	2025 Pontevedra	Elite
Silver medal – second place	2022 Targu Mures	Elite
Silver medal – second place	2023 Ibiza	Elite
Silver medal – second place	2024 Townsville	Elite
European Championships
Silver medal – second place	2018 Ibiza	Elite
Gold medal – first place	2019 Targu Mues	Elite
Gold medal – first place	2020 Punta Umbria	Elite
Gold medal – first place	2021 Targu Mures	Elite
Silver medal – second place	2022 Bilbao	Elite
Gold medal – first place	2023 Venica-Caorle	Elite
Bronze medal – third place	2024 Coimbra	Elite
Bronze medal – third place	2025 Rumia-Pomorskie	Elite

Benjamin Choquert (born 17 April 1986) is a French long-distance runner and duathlete. He won the silver medal in the men's individual duathlon event at the 2022 World Games held in Birmingham, United States.

In 2018, he competed in the men's half marathon at the 2018 IAAF World Half Marathon Championships held in Valencia, Spain. He finished in 40th place.

In 2019, he won the men's event at the ITU Duathlon World Championships held in Pontevedra, Spain.
