= Alina Bushma =

Ukrainian squash player (born 2000)

Personal information
- Born: 6 December 2000 (age 25) Kyiv, Ukraine

Sport
- Country: Ukraine
- Handedness: Right
- Retired: Active
- Racquet used: Prince

Women's singles
- Highest ranking: No. 62 (March 2025)
- Current ranking: No. 66 (April 2025)

Alina Bushma (born 6 December 2000) is a Ukrainian professional squash player. She reached a career high ranking of 62 in the world during March 2025.

She won the 2023 PAC Open tournament of the world tour. In March 2025, Bushma won her second PSA title after securing victory in the St. James Open during the 2024–25 PSA Squash Tour.
