= Italy at the 2025 World Games =

- IOC code: ITA
- NOC: Italian National Olympic Committee

in Chengdu, China 7 August 2025 – 17 August 2025
- Competitors: 176 (78 men and 98 women) in 24 sports and 130 events
- Medals Ranked 4th: Gold 13 Silver 25 Bronze 19 Total 57

World Games appearances (overview)
- 1981; 1985; 1989; 1993; 1997; 2001; 2005; 2009; 2013; 2017; 2022; 2025

Italy competed at the 2025 World Games held in Chengdu, China from 7 to 17 August 2025. Athletes representing Italy won 13 gold medals, 25 silver medals and 19 bronze medals. The country finished in fourth place in the medal table.

== Medalists ==
Medal	Name	Sport	Event	Date
Gold	Gabriele Brambillaschi; Davide Cremonini; Simone Locchi; Fabio Pezzotti	Lifesaving	Men's 4x50-metres pool life saver relay	8 August
Gold	Lucrezia Fabretti	Lifesaving	Women's 100 metres manikin carry with fins	8 August
Gold	Lucrezia Fabretti	Lifesaving	Women's 200 metres super lifesaver	8 August
Gold	Francesco Ippolito	Lifesaving	Men's 200 metres super lifesaver	8 August
Gold	Davide Cremonini; Francesco Ippolito; Simone Locchi; Fabio Pezzotti	Lifesaving	Men's 4x25-metres manikin relay	9 August
Gold	Davide Cremonini	Lifesaving	Men's 100 metres tow carry with fins	9 August
Gold	Alessandro Cianfoni	Freediving	Men's dynamic no fins FFS3-FFS4	10 August
Gold	Ilenia Colanero	Freediving	Women's dynamic no fins FFS3-FFS4	11 August
Gold	Pietro Napoli; Giovanni Napoli	Ju-jitsu	Mixed duo para mental	12 August
Gold	Matteo Borsani	Archery	Men's individual recurve	13 August
Gold	Federica Travolusci	Kickboxing	Women's point fighting 50 kg	14 August
Gold	Ivan Soligon; Natalie Gamba	Boules sports	Mixed lyonnaise quick shooting doubles	15 August
Gold	Simone Barbieri	Archery	Men's individual barebow	16 August
Silver	Francesco Mariani	Orienteering	Men's middle distance	8 August
Silver	Simone Locchi	Lifesaving	Men's 100 metres rescue medley	8 August
Silver	Francesca Pasquino; Valentina Pasquino; Helene Giovanelli; Federica Volpini	Lifesaving	Women's 4x50-metres pool life saver relay	8 August
Silver	Davide Cremonini	Lifesaving	Men's 100 metres manikin carry with fins	8 August
Silver	Fabio Pezzotti	Lifesaving	Men's 200 metres super lifesaver	8 August
Silver	Helene Giovanelli; Valentina Pasquino; Francesca Pasquino; Federica Volpini	Lifesaving	Women's 4x50-metres medley relay	9 August
Silver	Gabriele Brambillaschi; Simone Locchi; Francesco Ippolito; Davide Cremonini	Lifesaving	Men's 4x50-metres medley relay	9 August
Silver	Vanessa Tittarelli	Wakeboarding	Women's Cable Wakeboard	10 August
Silver	Marta Pozzi	Freediving	Women's dynamic with fins FFS1-FFS2	10 August
Silver	Alice Virag	Wakeboarding	Women's Freestyle	10 August
Silver	Gianluca Franzosi	Muaythai	Men's 71 kg	10 August
Silver	Katia Aere	Freediving	Women's dynamic no fins FFS3-FFS4	11 August
Silver	Antonella Farne	Ju-jitsu	Women's 52 kg fighting	11 August
Silver	Chiara Fiorelli	Ju-jitsu	Women's 63 kg fighting	11 August
Silver	Vincenzo Maiorca	Road speed skating	Men's 100 metre sprint	13 August
Silver	Chiara Rebagliati	Archery	Women's individual recurve	13 August
Silver	Sara Naldi	Powerlifting	Women's classic middleweight	14 August
Silver	Gabriele Lanzilao	Kickboxing	Men's point fighting 63 kg	14 August
Silver	Carola Garra	Powerlifting	Women's classic heavyweight	15 August
Silver	Marcelo Patteri; Davide Nacci; Francesco Sebastio; Matteo Falera; Sara Cutini	Aerobic gymnastics	Groups	15 August
Silver	Andrea Chiapello	Boules sports	Men's petanque precision shooting	16 August
Silver	Cinzia Noziglia	Archery	Women's individual barebow	16 August
Silver	Davide Nacci; Francesco Sebastio; Sara Cutini	Aerobic gymnastics	Trios	16 August
Silver	Andrea Bertelloni; Andrea Costagliola; Gianmarco Emanuele; Jan Haack; Tommaso Lampo; Fabrizia Massa; Giuseppe Ruggiero; Alessandro Schiano	Canoe polo	Men;s tournament	16 August
Silver	Valerio Degli Agostini	Freestyle inline skating	Men's classic slalom	17 August
Bronze	Helene Giovanelli	Lifesaving	Women's 100 metres rescue medley	8 August
Bronze	Francesco Ippolito	Lifesaving	Men's 100 metres rescue medley	8 August
Bronze	Alessio Ghinami	Karate	Men's kata	8 August
Bronze	Francesco Ippolito	Lifesaving	Men's 50 metres manikin carry	9 August
Bronze	Lucrezia Fabretti; Helene Giovanelli; Francesca Pasquino; Valentina Pasquino	Lifesaving	Women's 4x25-metres manikin relay	9 August
Bronze	Fabio Pezzotti	Lifesaving	Men's 100 metres tow carry with fins	9 August
Bronze	Susanna Cicali	Canoe marathon	Women's K1 short distance	9 August
Bronze	Clio Ferracuti	Karate	Women's kumite +68 kg	9 August
Bronze	Fabrizio Pagani	Freediving	Men's dynamic no fins FFS3-FFS4	10 August
Bronze	Erasmo Pagano	Ju-jitsu	Men's 69 kg fighting	10 August
Bronze	Salah Brahim; Erisa Marcantoni	Ju-jitsu	Mixed duo team open	10 August
Bronze	Mauro Generali	Freediving	Men's dynamic with fins	11 August
Bronze	Marta Pozzi	Freediving	Women's dynamic no fins FFS1-FFS2	11 August
Bronze	Marco Orsi	Finswimming	Men's 50 metre bi-fins	11 August
Bronze	Roberta Di Francesco	Archery	Women's individual recurve	13 August
Bronze	Andrea Consolini	Parkour	Men's speed	13 August
Bronze	Francesca Ceci	Kickboxing	Women's point fighting 60 kg	14 August
Bronze	Ivan Soligon	Boules sports	Men's single lyonnaise progressive	15 August
Bronze	Alessandra Cernigliaro	Powerlifting	Women's equipped middleweight	16 August

Medals by sport
Sport	1st place, gold medalist(s)	2nd place, silver medalist(s)	3rd place, bronze medalist(s)	Total
Lifesaving	6	6	5	17
Freediving	2	2	3	7
Archery	2	2	1	5
Ju-jitsu	1	2	2	5
Boules sports	1	1	1	3
Kickboxing	1	1	1	3
Powerlifting	0	2	1	3
Aerobic gymnastics	0	2	0	2
Wakeboarding	0	2	0	2
Canoe polo	0	1	0	1
Freestyle inline skating	0	1	0	1
Muaythai	0	1	0	1
Orieentering	0	1	0	1
Road speed skating	0	1	0	1
Karate	0	0	2	2
Canoe marathon	0	0	1	1
Finswimming	0	0	1	1
Parkour	0	0	1	1
Total	13	25	19	57

== Competitors ==
The following is the list of number of competitors in the Games.

Sport	Men	Women	Total
Air sports	0	1	1
American football	0	12	12
Archery	3	4	7
Boules sports	2	2	4
Canoe marathon	2	2	4
Canoe polo	8	8	16
Dancesport	2	6	8
Fistball	10	0	10
Gymnastics	9	8	17
Ju-jitsu	4	5	9
Karate	2	3	5
Kickboxing	1	2	3
Lifesaving	4	4	8
Muaythai	1	0	1
Orienteering	4	4	8
Powerlifting	0	4	4
Racquetball	1	1	2
Speed skating	2	2	4
Sambo	1	0	1
Sport climbing	4	4	8
Squash	0	1	1
Tug of war	5	6	11
Underwater sports	8	9	17
Wakeboarding	3	4	7
Wushu	2	2	4
Total	78	98	176

== Flag football ==
Women

Team	Event	Group play				Quarterfinals	Semifinal	Final / BM	
Team	Event	Opposition Result	Opposition Result	Opposition Result	Rank	Opposition Result	Opposition Result	Opposition Result	Rank
Italy women	Women's tournament	Great Britain; L 26–13	Mexico; L 46–7	Japan; L 33–6	4	United States; L 33–12	Consolation semifinalsGreat Britain; L 28–35	7th place gameJapan; L 0–33	8

== Fistball ==
Team	Event	Group Stage				Quarterfinal	Semifinal	Final / BM	
Team	Event	Opposition Score	Opposition Score	Opposition Score	Rank	Opposition Score	Opposition Score	Opposition Score	Rank
Italy Men's	Men's tournament	Chile; L 3–2	Argentina; W 1–3	New Zealand; W 3–0	2	Austria; L 3–0	Argentina; W 3–0	Chile; W 2–3	5

== Gymnastics ==
=== Parkour ===
Men

Athlete	Event	Qualification		Final	
Athlete	Event	Result	Rank	Result	Rank
Andrea Consolini	Men's speed	27.47	4 Q	27.27	3rd place, bronze medalist(s)

== Inline hockey ==
Summary

Team	Event	Group stage				Semifinal	Final / BM	
Team	Event	Opposition Score	Opposition Score	Opposition Score	Rank	Opposition Score	Opposition Score	Rank
Italy men	Men's tournament	Argentina; W 9–0	France; L 4–3	Czech Republic; L 3–2	3	China; W 7–1	Chinese Taipei; W 2–1	5

== Racquetball ==
Athlete	Event	Round of 16	Quarterfinal	Semifinal	Final / BM	
Athlete	Event	Opposition Result	Opposition Result	Opposition Result	Opposition Result	Rank
Carlo Papini	Men's singles					
Cristina Amaya	Women's singles					
Carlo Papini; Cristina Amaya	Double					

== Powerlifting ==
Classic

Athlete	Event	Exercises			Total weight	Total points	Rank
Athlete	Event	Squat	Bench press	Deadlift	Total weight	Total points	Rank
Carola Garra	Women's heavyweight	220.0	137.5	210.0	567.5	122.26	2nd place, silver medalist(s)
Chiara Bernardi	Women's middleweight	DSQ					
Sara Naldi	Women's middleweight	202.5	107.5	220.0	530.0	123.48	2nd place, silver medalist(s)
Annalisa Motta	Women's lightweight	145.0	87.5	175.0	407.5	114.37	5

Equipped

Athlete	Event	Exercises			Total weight	Total points	Rank
Athlete	Event	Squat	Bench press	Deadlift	Total weight	Total points	Rank
Alessandra Cernigliaro	Women's middleweight	225.0	140.0	200.0	565.0	110.61	3rd place, bronze medalist(s)

== Squash ==
Athlete	Event	Round of 32	Round of 16	Quarterfinals	Semi-finals	Final / BM	
Athlete	Event	Opposition Score	Opposition Score	Opposition Score	Opposition Score	Opposition Score	Rank
	Women's singles						

== Tug of war ==
Athlete	Event	Group stage						Semi-final	Final / BM	
Athlete	Event	Opposition Score	Opposition Score	Opposition Score	Opposition Score	Opposition Score	Rank	Opposition Score	Opposition Score	Rank
Team Italy	Mixed outdoor 580 kg									
