= Colombia at the 2025 World Games =

- IOC code: COL
- NOC: Colombian Olympic Committee
- Website: www.olimpicocol.co (in Spanish)

in Chengdu, China 7 August 2025 – 17 August 2025
- Competitors: 44 (24 men and 20 women) in 13 sports and 54 events
- Medals Ranked 10th: Gold 7 Silver 8 Bronze 6 Total 21

World Games appearances
- 1981; 1985; 1989; 1993; 1997; 2001; 2005; 2009; 2013; 2017; 2022; 2025

Colombia will compete at the 2025 World Games held in Chengdu, China from 7 to 17 August 2025. Athletes representing Colombia won seven gold medals, eight silver medals and six bronze medals. The country finished in 10th place in the medal table.

== Competitors ==
The following is the list of number of competitors in the Games.

| Sport | Men | Women | Total |
|---|---|---|---|
| Archery | 1 | 2 | 3 |
| Billards | 1 | 1 | 2 |
| Flying disc | 7 | 7 | 14 |
| Gymnastic | 1 | 0 | 1 |
| Ju-jitsu | 1 | 1 | 2 |
| Karate | 0 | 1 | 1 |
| Road speed skating Track speed skating | 2 | 2 | 4 |
| Sambo | 1 | 0 | 1 |
| Squash | 2 | 1 | 3 |
| Duathlon | 1 | 1 | 2 |
| Underwater sports | 5 | 4 | 9 |
| Wakeboarding | 1 | 0 | 1 |
| Wushu | 1 | 0 | 1 |
| Total | 24 | 20 | 44 |

== Medalists ==
| Medal | Name | Sport | Event | Date |
|---|---|---|---|---|
| Gold | María Fernanda Timms | Road speed skating | Women's 1 lap | 12 August |
| Gold | Gabriela Rueda | Road speed skating | Women's elimination race 15,000 metre | 13 August |
| Gold | Juan Mantilla | Road speed skating | Men's elimination race 15,000 metre | 13 August |
| Gold | Gabriela Rueda | Track speed skating | Women's point race 5,000 metre | 14 August |
| Gold | María Fernanda Timms | Track speed skating | Women's sprint 1,000 metre | 15 August |
| Gold | Gabriela Rueda | Track speed skating | Women's elimination race 10,000 metre | 15 August |
| Gold | Juan Mantilla | Track speed skating | Men's elimination race 10,000 metre | 15 August |
| Silver | Grace Fernández; Paula Aguirre; Viviana Retamozo; Diana Moreno | Finswimming | Women's 4x100 metre surface relay | 10 August |
| Silver | María Rodríguez | Freediving | Women's dynamic no fins FFS1-FFS2 | 11 August |
| Silver | Grace Fernández; Paula Aguirre; Viviana Retamozo; Diana Moreno | Finswimming | Women's 4x50 metre surface relay | 11 August |
| Silver | Jhon Tascon | Road speed skating | Men's 1 lap | 12 August |
| Silver | Gabriela Rueda | Road speed skating | Women's point race 10,000 metre | 12 August |
| Silver | Jhon Tascon | Track speed skating | Men's sprint 500 metre + d | 14 August |
| Silver | Gabriela Rueda | Track speed skating | Women's sprint 1,000 metre | 15 August |
| Silver | Jhon Tascon | Track speed skating | Men's sprint 1,000 metre | 15 August |
| Bronze | María Rodríguez | Freediving | Women's dynamic with fins FFS1-FFS2 | 10 August |
| Bronze | Mauricio Fernández; Juan Rodríguez; Juan Duque; Juan Ocampo | Finswimming | Men's 4x50 metre surface relay | 10 August |
| Bronze | Juan Ocampo | Finswimming | Men's 200 metre surface | 11 August |
| Bronze | Jeison Mora; Edgar Castillo | Ju-jitsu | Mixed duo para visual | 12 August |
| Bronze | Miguel Rodríguez | Squash | Men's singles | 12 August |
| Bronze | Jhon Tascon | Track speed skating | Men's dual time trial 200 metre | 14 August |

Medals by sport
| Sport | 1st place, gold medalist(s) | 2nd place, silver medalist(s) | 3rd place, bronze medalist(s) | Total |
| Track speed skating | 4 | 3 | 1 | 8 |
| Road speed skating | 3 | 2 | 0 | 5 |
| Finswimming | 0 | 2 | 2 | 4 |
| Freediving | 0 | 1 | 1 | 2 |
| Ju-jitsu | 0 | 0 | 1 | 1 |
| Squash | 0 | 0 | 1 | 1 |
| Total | 7 | 8 | 6 | 21 |

== Archery ==
Target - Compound

| Athlete | Event | Qualification | | Round of 32 | Round of 16 | Quarterfinals | Semifinal | Final / BM | |
| Athlete | Event | Score | Rank | Opposition Result | Opposition Result | Opposition Result | Opposition Result | Opposition Result | Rank |
|---|---|---|---|---|---|---|---|---|---|
| Daniel Munoz | Men's Compound | 699 | 20 | Sullivan (USA); L 150–145 | Did not advance | | | | 17 |

== Gymnastics ==
=== Parkour ===
Men

| Athlete | Event | Qualification | | Final | |
| Athlete | Event | Result | Rank | Result | Rank |
|---|---|---|---|---|---|
| Carlos Pena | Men's speed | 26.33 | 2 Q | 27.30 | 4 |

== Squash ==
| Athlete | Event | Round of 32 | Round of 16 / CR | Quarterfinals / CQ | Semi-finals / CS | Final / BM / CF | |
| Athlete | Event | Opposition Score | Opposition Score | Opposition Score | Opposition Score | Opposition Score | Rank |
|---|---|---|---|---|---|---|---|
| Ronald Palomino | Men's singles | E. Franco (GUA); L 0–3 | Classification round Li (CHN); W 3–0 | Classification round Kandra (GER); W 1–3 | Classification round Iqbal (PAK); W 3–1 | Classification final Adegoke (NGR); W 0–3 | 17 |
| Miguel Ángel Rodríguez | Men's singles | Zhang (CHN); W 0–3 | Zaman (PAK); W 2–3 | Lau (HKG); W 0–3 | Crouin (FRA); L 3–2 | Steinmann (SUI); W 3–1 | 3rd place, bronze medalist(s) |
| Lucía Bautista | Women's singles | Lincou (FRA); L 1–3 | Classification round Ghiorghisor (ROU); W 3–0 | Classification round Otrzasek (ROU); W 0–3 | Classification round Peychar (AUT); W 1–3 | Classification final Bushma (UKR); W 3–2 | 17 |
