= Romania at the 2025 World Games =

- IOC code: ROU
- NOC: Romanian Olympic and Sports Committee

in Chengdu, China 7 August 2025 – 17 August 2025
- Competitors: 34 (20 men and 14 women) in 6 sports and 13 events
- Medals Ranked 67th: Gold 0 Silver 1 Bronze 1 Total 2

World Games appearances
- 1981; 1985; 1989; 1993; 1997; 2001; 2005; 2009; 2013; 2017; 2022; 2025

Romania competed at the 2025 World Games held in Chengdu, China from 7 to 17 August 2025.

Athletes representing Romania won one silver medal and one bronze medal. The country finished in 67th place in the medal table.

== Medalists ==
| Medal | Name | Sport | Event | Date |
|---|---|---|---|---|
| Silver | Rares Cojoc; Andreea Matei | Dancesport | Standard | 9 August |
| Bronze | Leonard Manta; Daniel Țavoc; Darius Branda; Vlăduț Popa; Claudia Ristea | Aerobic gymnastics | Groups | 15 August |

== Competitors ==
The following is the list of number of competitors in the Games.

| Sport | Men | Women | Total |
|---|---|---|---|
| Air sports | 1 | 0 | 1 |
| Archery | 0 | 1 | 1 |
| Dancesport | 3 | 3 | 6 |
| Gymnastics | 8 | 8 | 16 |
| Ju-jitsu | 7 | 1 | 8 |
| Squash | 1 | 1 | 2 |
| Total | 20 | 14 | 34 |

== Squash ==
| Athlete | Event | Round of 32 | Round of 16 / CR | Quarterfinals / CQ | Semi-finals / CS | Final / BM / CF | |
| Athlete | Event | Opposition Score | Opposition Score | Opposition Score | Opposition Score | Opposition Score | Rank |
|---|---|---|---|---|---|---|---|
| Radu Pena | Men's singles | Mekhalfi (FRA); L 0–3 | Classification round Zhu (CHN); W 0–3 | Classification round Iqbal (PAK); L 0–3 | Did not advance | | =21 |
| Andreea Ghiorghisor | Women's singles | Lee (HKG); L 0–3 | Classification round Bautista (COL); L 3–0 | Consolation round Cheng (CHN); W 3–0 | Consolation round Yin (CHN); L 3–0 | Did not advance | =27 |
