= Magali Rousseau =

French swimmer

Personal information
- Full name: Magali Rousseau
- Nickname: Mag
- Nationality: France
- Born: 10 March 1988 (age 38) Neuilly-sur-Seine, France
- Height: 1.75 m (5 ft 9 in)
- Weight: 63 kg (139 lb)

Sport
- Sport: Swimming
- Strokes: Butterfly
- Club: Canet 66
- Coach: Philippe Lucas
Medal record
Women's lifesaving
Representing France
The World Games
Gold medal – first place	2013 Cali	50 m manikin carry
Gold medal – first place	2013 Cali	200 m super lifesaver
Gold medal – first place	2013 Cali	4x50m medley
Gold medal – first place	2013 Cali	4x50m obstacle
Gold medal – first place	2017 Wrocław	4x50m obstacle
Gold medal – first place	2022 Birmingham	200 m super lifesaver
Silver medal – second place	2022 Birmingham	4x25 m manikin
Silver medal – second place	2025 Chengdu	4x25m manikin
Bronze medal – third place	2013 Cali	200 m obstacle
Bronze medal – third place	2025 Chengdu	50 m manikin carry

Magali Rousseau (born 10 March 1988) is a French swimmer, who specialized in butterfly events. She represented her nation France in the 200 m butterfly at the 2008 Summer Olympics, and has been a member of Canet 66 in Canet-en-Roussillon throughout her swimming career under the tutelage of her coach Philippe Lucas. Rousseau is the daughter of three-time Olympic freestyle swimmer Michel Rousseau.

Rousseau competed as a lone French swimmer in the women's 200 m butterfly at the 2008 Summer Olympics in Beijing. Leading up to the Games, she topped the field with a personal best of 2:10.07 to eclipse both the nation's own Olympic standard and the FINA A-cut (2:10.84) at the French Championships in Dunkirk. Swimming on the far outside in heat three, Rousseau chased the rest of the swimmers throughout the race to round out the field with a seventh-place time in 2:13.12. Rousseau failed to advance to the semifinals, as she placed twenty-eighth overall in the prelims.

Rousseau is a very successful World Games athlete. In 2013, she won four gold medals and one bronze in life saving. In 2017, she won another gold medal in lifesaving.
