= Spain at the 2025 World Games =

- IOC code: ESP
- NOC: Spanish Olympic Committee

in Chengdu, China 7 August 2025 – 17 August 2025
- Competitors: 117 (60 men and 57 women) in 17 sports and 77 events
- Medals Ranked 8th: Gold 8 Silver 2 Bronze 13 Total 23

World Games appearances
- 1981; 1985; 1989; 1993; 1997; 2001; 2005; 2009; 2013; 2017; 2022; 2025

Spain will compete at the 2025 World Games held in Chengdu, China from 7 to 17 August 2025. Athletes representing Spain won 8 gold medals, 2 silver medals and 13 bronze medals. The country finished in 8th place in the medal table.

== Medalists ==
Medal	Name	Sport	Event	Date
Gold	Juan Daniel Molina; José Moreno	Acrobatic gymnastics	Men's pairs	9 August
Gold	Francisco Peula	Road speed skating	Men's 10,000 metre point race	12 August
Gold	Jhoan Guzmán	Road speed skating	Men's 1 lap	12 August
Gold	Jhoan Guzmán	Road speed skating	Men's sprint 100 metre	13 August
Gold	Jhoan Guzmán	Track speed skating	Men's dual time trial 200 metre	14 August
Gold	Jhoan Guzmán	Track speed skating	Men's sprint 500 metre + d	14 August
Gold	Jhoan Guzmán	Track speed skating	Men's sprint 1,000 metre	15 August
Gold	María Varo; Javier Martín	Duathlon	Mixed team relay	17 August
Silver	María Torres	Karate	Women's kumite 68 kg	9 August
Silver	María Varo	Duathlon	Women's individual	15 August
Bronze	Antia Garcia	Lifesaving	Women's 100 metres manikin carry with fins	8 August
Bronze	Paola García	Karate	Women's kata	8 August
Bronze	Diandra Illes; Guillem Pascual Iniesta	Dancesport	Latin	8 August
Bronze	Antia Garcia; Nuria Payola; Yael Mantecon; Maria Rodríguez	Lifesaving	Women's 4x50-metres medley relay	9 August
Bronze	Loreto Macho; Iago Monteagudo; Jakub Michalowicz; Luis Ourille; Nerea Novo; Lara Feijoo; Carmen Villar; Pablo Silva; Antia Landeira; Noa Conde Franco	Dragon boat	Open 8-seater 2000 metres	9 August
Bronze	Maria Prieto Del Campo	Orienteering	Women's sprint	10 August
Bronze	Loreto Macho; Iago Monteagudo; Jakub Michalowicz; Luis Ourille; Nerea Novo; Lara Feijoo; Carmen Villar; Pablo Silva; Antia Landeira; Noa Conde Franco; Miguel Ordonez; Jorge Alonso	Dragon boat	Mixed 10-seater 2000 metre	10 August
Bronze	Melania Rodríguez	Trampoline gymnastics	Women's double mini trampoline	10 August
Bronze	Asunción Batista Portero; Alba Díaz González; Patricia Encinas; Mariam Gonzalez; Violeta González Poudereux; Jimena Laguna; Gemma Sánchez; Miriam Sempere; Mireia Torras; Maria Trujillo Arteaga	Beach handball	Women's tournament	12 August
Bronze	Marta Domínguez	Squash	Women's singles	12 August
Bronze	André Fandiño	Wushu	Men's 85 kg	12 August
Bronze	César Vera	Archery	Men's individual barebow	16 August
Bronze	Laura Oria	Freestyle inline skating	Women's classic slalom	17 August

Medals by sport
Sport	1st place, gold medalist(s)	2nd place, silver medalist(s)	3rd place, bronze medalist(s)	Total
Road speed skating	3	0	0	3
Track speed skating	3	0	0	3
Duathlon	1	1	0	2
Acrobatic gymnastics	1	0	0	1
Karate	0	1	1	2
Dragon boat	0	0	2	2
Lifesaving	0	0	2	2
Archery	0	0	1	1
Beach handball	0	0	1	1
Dancesport	0	0	1	1
Freestyle inline skating	0	0	1	1
Orieentering	0	0	1	1
Squash	0	0	1	1
Trampoline gymnastics	0	0	1	1
Wushu	0	0	1	1
Total	8	2	13	23

== Competitors ==
The following is the list of number of competitors in the Games.

Sport	Men	Women	Total
Air sports	1	0	1
Archery	2	1	2
Billiards	0	1	1
Boules sports	1	1	2
Canoe dragon boat	11	11	22
Canoe marathon	2	2	4
Canoe polo	8	8	16
Dancesport	2	1	3
Gymnastics	3	3	6
Handball	10	10	20
Karate	1	2	3
Lifesaving	4	4	8
Orienteering	4	4	8
Powerlifting	2	0	2
Roller sports	4	3	7
Squash	1	1	2
Triathlon	3	1	4
Wakeboarding	0	3	3
Wushu	1	1	2
Total	60	57	117

== Acrobatic gymnastics ==
Spain qualified athlete at the 2024 Acrobatic Gymnastics World Championships.

Athletes	Event	Qualification						Final	
Athletes	Event	Balance exercise		Dynamic exercise		Total		Final exercise	
Athletes	Event	Result	Rank	Result	Rank	Result	Rank	Result	Rank
José Moreno; Juan Daniel Molina	Men's pairs								1st place, gold medalist(s)

== Aerobic gymnastics ==
Spain qualified athlete at the 2024 Aerobic Gymnastics World Championships.

Athlete	Event	Qualification		Final	
Athlete	Event	Result	Rank	Result	Rank
Miquel Mañé; Raúl Toro; Sonia Vidal; Nacho Viguer; Carles Guillem	Group	18.492	5		

== Air sports ==
Spain qualified one pilot in drone racing at the World Games, as a result of the FAI The World Games 2025 men Selection List.

Drone Racing

Athlete	Event	Classification		Round 1		Round 2		Semifinals		Finals	
Athlete	Event	Result	Rank	Result	Rank	Result	Rank	Result	Rank	Result	Rank
Vicent Mayans Cervera	Drone racing										

== Archery ==
Barebow – Men

Athlete	Elimination rounds		Semifinal	Final / BM	
Athlete	Opposition Score	Opposition Score	Opposition Score	Opposition Score	Rank
Césarr Vera Bringas	Wang (CHN); W 78–78	Meyer (GER); W 82–78	Barbieri (ITA); L 47–55	Jonnson (SWE); W 55–40	3rd place, bronze medalist(s)
David García Fernández					

Barebow – Women

Athlete	Ranking round		Round of 32	Round of 16	Quarterfinal	Semifinal	Final / BM	
Athlete	Score	Seed	Opposition Score	Opposition Score	Opposition Score	Opposition Score	Opposition Score	Rank
Ana María Cano García								

== Beach handball ==
Men

Team	Event	Preliminary round				Quarter-final	Semifinal / PM	Final / BM / PM	
Team	Event	Opposition Result	Opposition Result	Opposition Result	Rank	Opposition Result	Opposition Result	Opposition Result	Rank
Spain men's	Men's tournament	Denmark W 2–1	China W 2–0	Tunisia W 2–0	1	Croatia W 2–0	Portugal L 1–2	Brazil L 1–2	4

Women

Team	Event	Preliminary round				Quarter-final	Semifinal	Final / BM / PM	
Team	Event	Opposition Result	Opposition Result	Opposition Result	Rank	Opposition Result	Opposition Result	Opposition Result	Rank
Spain women's	Women's tournament	Germany L 0–2	Denmark W 2–0	Vietnam W 2–1	2	Portugal W 2–0	Argentina L 1–2	Denmark W 2–0	3rd place, bronze medalist(s)

== Billiards sports ==
Spain qualified one athlete to compete at the games.

Athlete	Event	Round of 16	Quarterfinal	Semifinal	Final / BM	
Athlete	Event	Opposition Result	Opposition Result	Opposition Result	Opposition Result	Rank
María Teresa Ropero García	Women's 10-Ball pool					

== Boules Sports ==
Pétanque precision shooting

Athlete	Event	Qualification		Semifinals	Final / BM	
Athlete	Event	Result	Rank	Opposition Result	Opposition Result	Rank
Jesús Escacho	Men's precision shooting					
Sara Díaz	Women's precision shooting					

Pétanque classic

Athlete	Event	Group matches			Semifinals	Final / BM	
Athlete	Event	Opposition Result	Opposition Result	Rank	Opposition Result	Opposition Result	Rank
Jesús Escacho & Sara Díaz	Mixed doubles						

== Duathlon ==
Individual

Athlete	Event	Time						Rank
Athlete	Event	Run	Trans 1	Bike	Trans 2	Run	Total	Rank
María Varo	Women's				00:19	23:03	1:25:33	2nd place, silver medalist(s)

Mixed

Athlete	Event	Time						Rank
Athlete	Event	Run	Trans 1	Bike	Trans 2	Run	Total	Rank
María Varo; Javier Martín	Mixed relay						1:19:21	1st place, gold medalist(s)

== Gymnastics ==
=== Parkour ===
Women

Athlete	Event	Qualification		Final	
Athlete	Event	Result	Rank	Result	Rank
Steffany Navarro	Women's speed	46.44	7 R	Did not advance	
Steffany Navarro	Women's freestyle	19.3	6 Q	19.0	6

== Karate ==
Kata

Athlete	Event	Elimination round		Semi-finals	Final / BM	
Athlete	Event	Score	Rank	Opposition Result	Opposition Result	Rank
Paola García	Women's kata			Ono (JPN); L 40.8–42.7	Sadeghi (IRI); W 41.6–40.1	3rd place, bronze medalist(s)

Kumite

Athlete	Event	Elimination round				Semi-finals	Final / BM	
Athlete	Event	Opposition Result	Opposition Result	Opposition Result	Rank	Opposition Result	Opposition Result	Rank
Paola García	Women's kumite +68kg	Kneer (GER); W 1–1	Okila (EGY); W 4–1	Sullivan (AUS); W 3–1	1	Berultseva (KAZ); W 2–1	Kneer (GER); L 3–0	2nd place, silver medalist(s)

== Orienteering ==
Spain competed in orienteering.

Men

Athlete	Event	Time	Rank
David Rojas	Sprint	DNS	
David Rojas	Middle distance	56.31	13
Quim Vich	Sprint	17.57	28
Quim Vich	Middle distance	DNF	

Women

Athlete	Event	Time	Rank
María Prieto	Sprint	16.25	3rd place, bronze medalist(s)
María Prieto	Middle distance	54.05	12
Ana Defez	Middle distance	1:11.45	30

== Powerlifting ==
Classic

Athlete	Event	Exercises			Total weight	Total points	Rank
Athlete	Event	Squat	Bench press	Deadlift	Total weight	Total points	Rank
Ivan Campano Diaz	Men's lightweight	220.0	152.5	270.0	642.5	105.49	6
Victor Vazquez H-Carrillo	Men's Super heavyweight	325.0	210.0	125.0	660.0	76.92	7

== Roller sports ==
Spain competed in:

Road speed skating

Athlete	Event	Time	Rank
Jhoan Guzmán	100m sprint		1st place, gold medalist(s)
Jhoan Guzmán	1 lap		1st place, gold medalist(s)
Francisco Peula	10,000m point race		1st place, gold medalist(s)

Track speed skating

Athlete	Event	Time	Rank
Jhoan Guzmán	200m time trial		1st place, gold medalist(s)
Jhoan Guzmán	500m sprint		1st place, gold medalist(s)
Jhoan Guzmán	1,000m sprint		1st place, gold medalist(s)

== Squash ==
Athlete	Event	Round of 32	Round of 16 / CR	Quarterfinals / CQ	Semi-finals / CS	Final / BM / CF	
Athlete	Event	Opposition Score	Opposition Score	Opposition Score	Opposition Score	Opposition Score	Rank
Marta Domínguez	Women's singles	Cheng (CHN) W 3–0	Tycova (GER) W 3–0	Lee Ka (HKG) W 3–2	Watanabe (JPN) L 0–3	Ho (HKG) W 3–0	3rd place, bronze medalist(s)
Cristina Gómez	Women's singles	Sugimoto (JPN) W 3–0	Classification round Merlo (SUI) L 0–3	Did not advance			=13

== Trampoline gymnastics ==
Spain qualified athletes at the 2023 Trampoline Gymnastics World Championships.

Athlete	Event	Qualification		Final	
Athlete	Event	Score	Rank	Score	Rank
Melania Rodríguez	Double Mini Women				3rd place, bronze medalist(s)
Carlos del Ser	Double Mini Men				

== Wushu ==
Spain qualified two athlete at the 2023 World Wushu Championships.

Sanda

Athlete	Event	Qualification		Final	
Athlete	Event	Opponent	Result	Opponent	Result
Marta Coral García Carazo	Women's sanda 60 kg				
André Fandiño Bonet	Men's sanda 80 kg				3rd place, bronze medalist(s)
