= Australia at the 2025 World Games =

- IOC code: AUS
- NOC: Australian Olympic Committee

in Chengdu, China 7 August 2025 – 17 August 2025
- Competitors: 138 (61 men and 77 women) in 22 sports and 66 events
- Medals Ranked 43rd: Gold 1 Silver 1 Bronze 5 Total 7

World Games appearances
- 1981; 1985; 1989; 1993; 1997; 2001; 2005; 2009; 2013; 2017; 2022; 2025

Australia competed at the 2025 World Games held in Chengdu, China from 7 to 17 August 2025.

Athletes representing Australia won one gold medal, one silver medal and five bronze medals. The country finished in 43rd place in the medal table.

== Medalists ==
Medal	Name	Sport	Event	Date
Gold	Noah Bollard	Wakeboarding	Men's freestyle	10 August
Silver	Simon Fairweather	Archery	Men's barebow	16 August
Bronze	Piper Asquith; Rachel Eddy; Mariah Jones; Cyra Bender	Lifesaving	Women's 4x50-metres pool life saver relay	8 August
Bronze	Callum Brennan; Riley Brennan; Harrison Hynes; Jake Smith	Lifesaving	Men's 4x25-metres manikin relay	9 August
Bronze	Australia women's national lacrosse team: Hannah Nielsen; Stephanie Kelly; Rebecca Lane; Abby Thorne; Addy Cunningham; Olivia Parker; Theo Kwas; Ocea Leavy; Ashtyn Hiron; Georgia Latch; Mim Suares-Jury; Bonnie Yu	Lacrosse	Women's tournament	11 August
Bronze	Natalie Soli'ai Laalaai	Powerlifting	Women's super heavyweight	15 August
Bronze	Emily Growdon; Shayla Myerscough	Cheerleading	Pom doubles mixed	16 August

== Competitors ==
The following is the list of number of competitors in the Games.

Sport	Men	Women	Total
Archery	3	4	7
Baseball	15	15	30
Billards	1	1	2
Boules sports	1	1	2
Canoe marathon	2	2	4
Cheerleading	0	2	2
Dancesport	1	0	1
Flying disc	7	7	14
Acrobatic gymnastics	0	2	2
Aerobic gymnastics	0	8	8
Parkour gymnastics	0	1	1
Trampoline gymnastics	2	2	4
Karate	1	1	2
Kickboxing	2	1	3
Korfball	3	3	6
Lacrosse	0	12	12
Lifesaving	4	2	6
Muaythai	0	1	1
Orienteering	4	4	8
Powerlifting	0	1	1
Sambo	1	0	1
Squash	1	1	2
Triathlon	2	0	2
Wakeboarding	1	1	2
Wushu	1	0	1
Total	61	77	138

== Baseball ==
Men

Team	Event	Group play				Semifinal	Final / BM	
Team	Event	Opposition Result	Opposition Result	Opposition Result	Rank	Opposition Result	Opposition Result	Rank
Australia men	Men's tournament	Singapore (SGP) L 10–9	Canada (CAN) L 11–2	United States (USA) L 3–14	4	Argentina (ARG) L 1–12	Singapore (SGP) W 5–12	7

Women

Team	Event	Group play				Semifinal	Final / BM	
Team	Event	Opposition Result	Opposition Result	Opposition Result	Rank	Opposition Result	Opposition Result	Rank
Australia women	Women's tournament	Japan; L 3–10	Canada; L 9–0	Puerto Rico; W 9–1	3	China; W 3–4	Puerto Rico; Cancelled	5

== Gymnastics ==
=== Parkour ===
Women

Athlete	Event	Qualification		Final	
Athlete	Event	Result	Rank	Result	Rank
Stephania Zitis	Women's speed	58.17	2 R	Did not advance	
Stephania Zitis	Women's freestyle	16.0	9 R	Did not advance	

== Korfball ==
Beach

Australia qualified in beach korfball at the 2024 World Beach Korfball Championship.

Athlete	Event	Group stage				Quarterfinal	Semi-final	Final / BM	
Athlete	Event	Opposition Score	Opposition Score	Opposition Score	Rank	Opposition Score	Opposition Score	Opposition Score	Rank
Team Australia	Beach Korfball	Netherlands; L 18-0	Poland; L 16-3	Belgium; L 15-3	4	Chinese Taipei; L 15–11	China; L 13-6	United States; L 7-3	8

== Lacrosse ==
Summary

Team	Event	Preliminary round				Semifinal	Final / BM	
Team	Event	Opposition Result	Opposition Result	Opposition Result	Rank	Opposition Result	Opposition Result	Rank
Australia women	Women's tournament							

== Powerlifting ==
Classic

Athlete	Event	Exercises			Total weight	Total points	Rank
Athlete	Event	Squat	Bench press	Deadlift	Total weight	Total points	Rank
Natalie Soli'ai Laalaai	Women's Super Heavyweight	267.5	137.5	287.5 WR	692.5	155.81	3rd place, bronze medalist(s)

== Squash ==
Athlete	Event	Round of 32	Round of 16 / CR	Quarterfinals / CQ	Semi-finals / CS	Final / BM / CF	
Athlete	Event	Opposition Score	Opposition Score	Opposition Score	Opposition Score	Opposition Score	Rank
Joseph White	Men's singles	Lutz (AUT); W 3–0	Steinmann (SUI); L 2–3	Classification round Mekhalfi (FRA); W 0–3	Classification round van Niekerk (RSA); L 3–2	Did not advance	=11
Emily Lamb	Women's singles	Ward (RSA); L 3–1	Classification round Liu (CHN); L 2–3	Did not advance			=29
