= 2019 Orienteering World Cup =

25. Orienteering World Cup

World Cup events
- Individual: 9
- Relay: 4

Men's World Cup
- 1st: Gustav Bergman (SWE)
- 2nd: Joey Hadorn (SUI)
- 3rd: Daniel Hubmann (SUI)
- Most wins: Gustav Bergman (SWE) (3)

Women's World Cup
- 1st: Tove Alexandersson (SWE)
- 2nd: Simona Aebersold (SUI)
- 3rd: Natalia Gemperle (RUS)
- Most wins: Tove Alexandersson (SWE) (8)

Team World Cup
- 1st: Sweden
- 2nd: Switzerland
- 3rd: Finland
- Most wins: Sweden (3)

The 2019 Orienteering World Cup was the 25th edition of the Orienteering World Cup. The 2019 Orienteering World Cup consisted of nine individual events and four relay events. The events are located in Finland, Norway, Switzerland and China. The 2019 World Orienteering Championships in Østfold, Norway are included in the World Cup.

== Events ==
=== Men ===
No.	Venue	Distance	Date	Winner	Second	Third	Ref.
Round 1 - Finland
1	Helsinki, Finland	Middle	8 June	(Sweden) Gustav Bergman	(France) Frédéric Tranchand	(Norway) Olav Lundanes	
2	Helsinki, Finland	Pursuit	9 June	(Sweden) Gustav Bergman	(France) Frédéric Tranchand	(Norway) Magne Dæhli	
Round 2 - World Championships
3	Østfold, Norway	Long (WOC)	14 August	(Norway) Olav Lundanes	(Norway) Kasper Fosser	(Switzerland) Daniel Hubmann	
4	Østfold, Norway	Middle (WOC)	16 August	(Norway) Olav Lundanes	(Sweden) Gustav Bergman	(Norway) Magne Dæhli	
Round 3 - Switzerland
5	Laufen, Switzerland	Middle	27 September	(Switzerland) Joey Hadorn	(Switzerland) Daniel Hubmann	(Sweden) Martin Regborn	
6	Laufen, Switzerland	Knockout Sprint	28 September	(Czech Republic) Vojtech Kral	(Switzerland) Joey Hadorn	(United Kingdom) Ralph Street	
7	Laufen, Switzerland	Sprint	29 September	(Belgium) Yannick Michiels	(United Kingdom) Kristian Jones	(Switzerland) Matthias Kyburz	
Round 4 - Finals
8	Guangzhou, China	Middle	26 October	(Sweden) Gustav Bergman	(Switzerland) Joey Hadorn	(France) Lucas Basset	
9	Guangzhou, China	Sprint	29 October	(Belgium) Yannick Michiels	(France) Maxime Rauturier	(China) Li ZhouYe	

=== Women ===
No.	Venue	Distance	Date	Winner	Second	Third	Ref.
Round 1 - Finland
1	Helsinki, Finland	Middle	8 June	(Sweden) Tove Alexandersson	(Russia) Natalia Gemperle	(Finland) Marika Teini	
2	Helsinki, Finland	Long Pursuit	9 June	(Sweden) Tove Alexandersson	(Finland) Marika Teini	(Norway) Kamilla Olaussen	
Round 2 - World Championships
3	Østfold, Norway	Long (WOC)	14 August	(Sweden) Tove Alexandersson	(Sweden) Lina Strand	(Switzerland) Simona Aebersold	
4	Østfold, Norway	Middle (WOC)	16 August	(Sweden) Tove Alexandersson	(Switzerland) Simona Aebersold	(Russia) Natalia Gemperle (Finland) Venla Harju	
Round 3 - Switzerland
5	Laufen, Switzerland	Middle	27 September	(Sweden) Tove Alexandersson	(Switzerland) Simona Aebersold	(Switzerland) Sabine Hauswirth	
6	Laufen, Switzerland	Knockout Sprint	28 September	(Sweden) Tove Alexandersson	(Czech Republic) Tereza Janosikova	(Switzerland) Elena Roos	
7	Laufen, Switzerland	Sprint	29 September	(Sweden) Tove Alexandersson	(Switzerland) Elena Roos	(Switzerland) Simona Aebersold	
Round 4 - Finals
8	Guangzhou, China	Middle	26 October	(Sweden) Tove Alexandersson	(Russia) Natalia Gemperle	(Switzerland) Julia Jakob	
9	Guangzhou, China	Sprint	29 October	(China) Shuangyan Hao	(Switzerland) Simona Aebersold	(Sweden) Sara Hagström	

The results of the last round (sprint) were contested after excellent performances by Chinese competitors, leading to a delay of the official results. The International Orienteering Federation deemed that the results stood in March 2020 following a review, stating that "none of the alleged elements of the cheating claims occurred or can be substantiated", and that "analyses show that those who produced the best results are shown and known to be capable of such running speeds". The review was requested after the 2019 Military World Games, also held in China, in which Chinese competitors were disqualified from the middle race. This decision was upheld by the ethics committee (i.e the competitors remain disqualified).

=== Relay ===
No.	Venue	Distance	Date	Winner	Second	Third	Ref.
1	Helsinki, Finland	Sprint Relay	11 June	Sweden Tove Alexandersson; Emil Svensk; Gustav Bergman; Karolin Ohlsson	Switzerland Simona Aebersold; Matthias Kyburz; Daniel Hubmann; Elena Roos	Czech Republic Denisa Kosova; Miloš Nykodým; Vojtěch Král; Tereza Janosikova	
2	Østfold, Norway	Women's relay (WOC)	17 August	Sweden Lina Strand; Tove Alexandersson; Karolin Ohlsson	Switzerland Sabine Hauswirth; Simona Aebersold; Julia Jakob	Russia Anastasia Rudnaya; Tatiana Ryabkina; Natalia Gemperle	
3	Østfold, Norway	Men's relay (WOC)	17 August	Sweden Johan Runesson; Emil Svensk; Gustav Bergman	Finland Aleksi Niemi; Elias Kuukka; Miika Kirmula	France Nicolas Rio; Frédéric Tranchand; Lucas Basset	
4	Guangzhou, China	Sprint Relay	27 October	Switzerland Simona Aebersold; Matthias Kyburz; Joey Hadorn; Elena Roos	Sweden Alva Olsson; Max Peter Bejmer; Martin Regborn; Sara Hagstrom	Norway Victoria Haestad Bjornstad; Gaute Hallan Steiwer; Kasper Fosser; Andrine Benjaminsen	

== Points distribution ==
The 40 best runners in each event are awarded points. The winner is awarded 100 points. In WC events 1 to 7, the six best results counts in the overall classification. In the finals (WC 8 and WC 9), both results counts.

Rank	1	2	3	4	5	6	7	8	9	10	11	12	13	14	15	16	17	18	19	20	21	22	23	24	25	26	27	28	29	30	31	32	33	34	35	36	37	38	39	40
Points	100	80	60	50	45	40	37	35	33	31	30	29	28	27	26	25	24	23	22	21	20	19	18	17	16	15	14	13	12	11	10	9	8	7	6	5	4	3	2	1

== Overall standings ==
This section shows the overall standings after all nine individual events.

=== Men ===
Rank	Athlete	Points
1	(Sweden) Gustav Bergman	499
2	(Switzerland) Joey Hadorn	394
3	(Switzerland) Daniel Hubmann	378
4	(Norway) Olav Lundanes	370
5	(Czech Republic) Vojtech Kral	338
6	(France) Frédéric Tranchand	308
7	(Switzerland) Matthias Kyburz	305
8	(Sweden) Martin Regborn	257
9	(Belgium) Yannick Michiels	250
10	(France) Lucas Basset	239

=== Women ===
Rank	Athlete	Points
1	(Sweden) Tove Alexandersson	600
2	(Switzerland) Simona Aebersold	343
3	(Russia) Natalia Gemperle	340
4	(Switzerland) Sabine Hauswirth	270
5	(Switzerland) Elena Roos	248
6	(Switzerland) Julia Jakob	224
7	(Finland) Venla Harju	223
8	(Finland) Marika Teini	162
9	(Sweden) Sara Hagstrom	159
10	(Czech Republic) Denisa Kosova	158

=== Relay ===
The table shows the standings after all four relay events. All results count in the overall standings.

Rank	Nation	1 (SR)	2 (W)	3 (M)	4 (SR)	Points
1	Sweden	100	100	100	80	380
2	Switzerland	80	80	40	100	300
3	Finland	40	40	80	50	210
4	Norway	50	50	45	60	205
5	Czech Republic	60	45	50	45	200
6	Russia	45	60	29	29	163
7	Austria	31	31	37	33	132
8	United Kingdom	37	33	24	35	129
9	Denmark	33	35	28	30	126
10	Poland	35	25	25	40	125
