= 2018 Orienteering World Cup =

International orienteering competition

World Cup events
- Individual: 11
- Relay: 9

Men's World Cup
- 1st: Matthias Kyburz (SUI)
- 2nd: Daniel Hubmann (SUI)
- 3rd: Olav Lundanes (NOR)
- Most wins: Matthias Kyburz (SUI) (2); Olav Lundanes (NOR) (2); Daniel Hubmann (SUI) (2)

Women's World Cup
- 1st: Tove Alexandersson (SWE)
- 2nd: Karolin Ohlsson (SWE)
- 3rd: Natalia Gemperle (RUS)
- Most wins: Tove Alexandersson (SWE) (6)

Team World Cup
- 1st: Switzerland
- 2nd: Sweden
- 3rd: Norway
- Most wins: Switzerland (4)

The 2018 Orienteering World Cup was the 24th edition of the Orienteering World Cup. The 2018 Orienteering World Cup consisted of 11 individual events and 9 relay events. The events were located in Switzerland, Latvia, Norway and Czech Republic. The European Orienteering Championships in Ticino, Switzerland and the 2018 World Orienteering Championships in Riga, Latvia were included in the World Cup.

Matthias Kyburz of Switzerland won his third consecutive overall title in the men's World Cup, his fifth title in total. Tove Alexandersson of Sweden won her fifth overall title in the women's World Cup.

== Events ==
=== Men ===
No.	Venue	Distance	Date	Winner	Second	Third	Ref.
Round 1 - European Championships
1	Ticino, Switzerland	Sprint	6 May	(Switzerland) Daniel Hubmann (Switzerland) Matthias Kyburz	none	(United Kingdom) Kristian Jones	
2	Ticino, Switzerland	Middle	9 May	(Switzerland) Matthias Kyburz	(Switzerland) Florian Howald	(Norway) Olav Lundanes	
3	Ticino, Switzerland	Long	13 May	(Norway) Olav Lundanes	(Switzerland) Matthias Kyburz	(Austria) Gernot Kerschbaumer	
Round 2 - World Championships
4	Riga, Latvia	Sprint (WOC)	4 August	(Switzerland) Daniel Hubmann	(New Zealand) Tim Robertson	(Switzerland) Andreas Kyburz	
5	Riga, Latvia	Middle (WOC)	7 August	(Norway) Eskil Kinneberg	(Switzerland) Daniel Hubmann	(Switzerland) Florian Howald	
6	Riga, Latvia	Long (WOC)	11 August	(Norway) Olav Lundanes	(Ukraine) Ruslan Glibov	(Switzerland) Fabian Hertner	
Round 3 - Norway
7	Østfold, Norway	Long	31 August	(Sweden) Gustav Bergman	(Norway) Olav Lundanes	(Switzerland) Matthias Kyburz	
8	Østfold, Norway	Prologue + Middle Pursuit	1 September	(Sweden) William Lind	(Sweden) Gustav Bergman	(France) Frederic Tranchand	
Round 4 - Finals
9	Prague, Czech Republic	Knockout Sprint	4 October	(Czech Republic) Vojtěch Král	(Sweden) Jonas Leandersson	(Sweden) Gustav Bergman	
10	Prague, Czech Republic	Middle	6 October	(Czech Republic) Miloš Nykodým	(Switzerland) Andreas Kyburz	(Austria) Gernot Kerschbaumer	
11	Prague, Czech Republic	Sprint	7 October	(Sweden) Jonas Leandersson	(Belgium) Yannick Michiels	(Switzerland) Matthias Kyburz	

=== Women ===
No.	Venue	Distance	Date	Winner	Second	Third	Ref.
Round 1 - European Championships
1	Ticino, Switzerland	Sprint	6 May	(Sweden) Tove Alexandersson	(Switzerland) Judith Wyder	(Russia) Natalia Gemperle	
2	Ticino, Switzerland	Middle	9 May	(Finland) Marika Teini	(Sweden) Tove Alexandersson	(Switzerland) Simona Aebersold	
3	Ticino, Switzerland	Long	13 May	(Sweden) Tove Alexandersson	(Russia) Natalia Gemperle	(Switzerland) Julia Gross	
Round 2 - World Championships
4	Riga, Latvia	Sprint (WOC)	4 August	(Denmark) Maja Alm	(Sweden) Tove Alexandersson	(Switzerland) Judith Wyder	
5	Riga, Latvia	Middle (WOC)	7 August	(Russia) Natalia Gemperle	(Finland) Marika Teini	(France) Isia Basset	
6	Riga, Latvia	Long (WOC)	11 August	(Sweden) Tove Alexandersson	(Denmark) Maja Alm	(Switzerland) Sabine Hauswirth	
Round 3 - Norway
7	Østfold, Norway	Long	31 August	(Sweden) Tove Alexandersson	(Norway) Kamilla Olaussen	(Sweden) Karolin Ohlsson	
8	Østfold, Norway	Prologue + Middle Pursuit	1 September	(Sweden) Tove Alexandersson	(Sweden) Karolin Ohlsson	(Russia) Anastasia Rudnaya	
Round 4 - Finals
9	Prague, Czech Republic	Knockout Sprint	4 October	(Switzerland) Judith Wyder	(Sweden) Karolin Ohlsson	(Sweden) Tove Alexandersson	
10	Prague, Czech Republic	Middle	6 October	(Sweden) Karolin Ohlsson	(Switzerland) Julia Jakob	(Sweden) Lina Strand	
11	Prague, Czech Republic	Sprint	7 October	(Sweden) Tove Alexandersson	(Finland) Maija Sianoja	(Switzerland) Judith Wyder	

=== Relay ===
No.	Venue	Distance	Date	Winner	Second	Third	Ref.
1	Ticino, Switzerland	Sprint Relay (EOC)	10 May	Switzerland Judith Wyder; Florian Howald; Martin Hubmann; Elena Roos	Sweden Lina Strand; Emil Svensk; Jonas Leandersson; Karolin Ohlsson	Norway Sigrid Alexandersen; Trond Einar Moen Pedersli; Øystein Kvaal Østerbø; Andrine Benjaminsen	
2	Ticino, Switzerland	Women's relay (EOC)	12 May	Switzerland Judith Wyder; Elena Roos; Julia Gross	Sweden Lina Strand; Sara Hagström; Karolin Ohlsson	Denmark Cecilie Friberg Klysner; Ida Bobach; Maja Alm	
3	Ticino, Switzerland	Men's relay (EOC)	12 May	Norway Eskil Kinneberg; Magne Dæhli; Olav Lundanes	Switzerland Florian Howald; Matthias Kyburz; Daniel Hubmann	France Nicolas Rio; Lucas Basset; Frederic Tranchand	
4	Riga, Latvia	Sprint Relay (WOC)	5 August	Sweden Tove Alexandersson; Emil Svensk; Jonas Leandersson; Karolin Ohlsson	Switzerland Elena Roos; Florian Howald; Fabian Hertner; Judith Wyder	Denmark Amanda Falck Weber; Tue Lassen; Jakob Edsen; Maja Alm	
5	Riga, Latvia	Women's relay (WOC)	9 August	Switzerland Elena Roos; Julia Jakob; Judith Wyder	Sweden Helena Bergman; Karolin Ohlsson; Tove Alexandersson	Russia Anastasia Rudnaya; Tatyana Riabkina; Natalia Gemperle	
6	Riga, Latvia	Men's relay (WOC)	9 August	Norway Gaute Hallan Steiwer; Eskil Kinneberg; Magne Dæhli	Switzerland Florian Howald; Daniel Hubmann; Matthias Kyburz	France Nicolas Rio; Lucas Basset; Frederic Tranchand	
7	Østfold, Norway	Women's relay	2 September	Sweden Lina Strand; Karolin Ohlsson; Tove Alexandersson	Norway Silje Ekroll Jahren; Marianne Andersen; Kamilla Olaussen	Finland Sari Anttonen; Lotta Karhola; Henna Riikka Haikonen	
8	Østfold, Norway	Men's relay	2 September	Norway Eskil Kinneberg; Olav Lundanes; Magne Dæhli	Sweden Albin Ridefeldt; Gustav Bergman; William Lind	Sweden 2 Martin Regborn; Jonas Leandersson; Emil Svensk	
9	Prague, Czech Republic	Sprint Relay	5 October	Switzerland 1 Sabine Hauswirth; Andreas Kyburz; Florian Howald; Judith Wyder	Sweden 1 Lina Strand; Emil Svensk; Jonas Leandersson; Tove Alexandersson	Switzerland 2 Julia Jakob; Thomas Curiger; Jonas Egger; Martina Ruch	

== Points distribution ==
The 40 best runners in each event were awarded points. The winner was awarded 100 points. In WC events 1 to 9, the eight best results counted in the overall classification. In the finals (WC 10 and WC 11), both results counted.

Rank	1	2	3	4	5	6	7	8	9	10	11	12	13	14	15	16	17	18	19	20	21	22	23	24	25	26	27	28	29	30	31	32	33	34	35	36	37	38	39	40
Points	100	80	60	50	45	40	37	35	33	31	30	29	28	27	26	25	24	23	22	21	20	19	18	17	16	15	14	13	12	11	10	9	8	7	6	5	4	3	2	1

== Overall standings ==
This section shows the final standings after all 10 individual events.

=== Men ===
Rank	Athlete	Points
1	(Switzerland) Matthias Kyburz	596
2	(Switzerland) Daniel Hubmann	538
3	(Norway) Olav Lundanes	470
4	(Sweden) Gustav Bergman	414
5	(Czech Republic) Vojtech Kral	393
6	(Ukraine) Ruslan Glibov	353
7	(France) Frederic Tranchand	310
8	(Sweden) Jonas Leandersson	264
9	(Austria) Gernot Kerschbaumer	261
10	(Norway) Eskil Kinneberg	260

=== Women ===
Rank	Athlete	Points
1	(Sweden) Tove Alexandersson	851
2	(Sweden) Karolin Ohlsson	535
3	(Russia) Natalia Gemperle	438
4	(Finland) Marika Teini	393
5	(Switzerland) Sabine Hauswirth	393
6	(Switzerland) Judith Wyder	335
7	(Finland) Maija Sianoja	306
8	(Switzerland) Julia Jakob	302
9	(Denmark) Maja Alm	275
10	(Sweden) Lina Strand	257

=== Relay ===
The table shows the final standings after all 9 relay events. All results counted in the overall standings.

Rank	Nation	1 (SR)	2 (W)	3 (M)	4 (SR)	5 (W)	6 (M)	7 (W)	8 (M)	9 (SR)	Points
1	Switzerland	100	100	80	80	100	80	50	45	100	735
2	Sweden	80	80	30	100	80	33	100	80	80	663
3	Norway	60	50	100	50	50	100	80	100	50	640
4	Czech Republic	50	27	50	45	33	45	37	60	60	407
5	Finland	33	40	31	35	45	37	60	50	45	376
6	Russia	35	45	40	40	60	31	40	26	33	350
7	Austria	45	35	33	28	35	50	45	33	35	339
8	Denmark	37	60	28	60	40	29	33	0	28	315
9	France	28	33	60	27	60	0	29	30	40	307
10	(United Kingdom) Great Britain	40	37	45	37	40	0	27	35	31	292

== Achievements ==
Only individual competitions.
