= 2017 Orienteering World Cup =

International orienteering competition

World Cup events
- Individual: 10
- Relay: 7

Men's World Cup
- 1st: Matthias Kyburz (SUI)
- 2nd: Olav Lundanes (NOR)
- 3rd: Daniel Hubmann (SUI)
- Most wins: Matthias Kyburz (SUI) (2); Olav Lundanes (NOR) (2)

Women's World Cup
- 1st: Tove Alexandersson (SWE)
- 2nd: Natalia Gemperle (RUS)
- 3rd: Sabine Hauswirth (SUI)
- Most wins: Tove Alexandersson (SWE) (5)

Team World Cup
- 1st: Sweden
- 2nd: Switzerland
- 3rd: Norway
- Most wins: Sweden (5)

The 2017 Orienteering World Cup was the 23rd edition of the Orienteering World Cup. The 2017 Orienteering World Cup consisted of 10 individual events, four relays and three sprint relay events. The events were located in Finland, Estonia, Latvia and Switzerland. The 2017 World Orienteering Championships in Tartu, Estonia are included in the World Cup.

Matthias Kyburz of Switzerland won his second consecutive overall title in the men's World Cup, his fourth title in total. Tove Alexandersson of Sweden won her fourth consecutive overall title in the women's World Cup.

== Events ==
=== Men ===
No.	Venue	Distance	Date	Winner	Second	Third	Ref.
Round 1 - Finland Tour
1	Lohja, Finland	Sprint	25 May	(Belgium) Yannick Michiels	(Switzerland) Matthias Kyburz	(Sweden) Emil Svensk	
2	Lohja, Finland	Middle	27 May	(Sweden) Martin Regborn	(Norway) Olav Lundanes	(Sweden) William Lind	
3	Lohja, Finland	Long Pursuit	28 May	(Norway) Magne Dæhli	(Sweden) William Lind	(Sweden) Emil Svensk	
Round 2 - World Championships
4	Tartu, Estonia	Sprint (WOC)	1 July	(Switzerland) Daniel Hubmann	(France) Frederic Tranchand	(Sweden) Jerker Lysell	
5	Tartu, Estonia	Long (WOC)	4 July	(Norway) Olav Lundanes	(Russia) Leonid Novikov	(Sweden) William Lind	
6	Tartu, Estonia	Middle (WOC)	6 July	(France) Thierry Gueorgiou	(Switzerland) Fabian Hertner	(Ukraine) Oleksandr Kratov	
Round 3 - Latvia
7	Cēsis, Latvia	Middle	25 August	(Norway) Olav Lundanes	(Switzerland) Matthias Kyburz	(Sweden) Gustav Bergman	
8	Cēsis, Latvia	Sprint	28 August	(Czech Republic) Vojtech Kral	(Sweden) Jerker Lysell	(Switzerland) Matthias Kyburz	
Round 4 - Finals
9	Grindelwald, Switzerland	Long	29 September	(Switzerland) Matthias Kyburz	(Norway) Olav Lundanes	(Norway) Magne Dæhli	
10	Grindelwald, Switzerland	Middle	30 September	(Switzerland) Matthias Kyburz	(Switzerland) Daniel Hubmann	(Sweden) Emil Svensk	

=== Women ===
No.	Venue	Distance	Date	Winner	Second	Third	Ref.
Round 1 - Finland Tour
1	Lohja, Finland	Sprint	25 May	(Denmark) Maja Alm	(Sweden) Tove Alexandersson	(Sweden) Lina Strand	
2	Lohja, Finland	Middle	27 May	(Sweden) Helena Jansson	(Russia) Natalia Gemperle	(Sweden) Lina Strand	
3	Lohja, Finland	Long Pursuit	28 May	(Sweden) Tove Alexandersson	(Sweden) Helena Jansson	(Denmark) Maja Alm	
Round 2 - World Championships
4	Tartu, Estonia	Sprint (WOC)	1 July	(Denmark) Maja Alm	(Russia) Natalia Gemperle	(Russia) Galina Vinogradova	
5	Tartu, Estonia	Long (WOC)	4 July	(Sweden) Tove Alexandersson	(Denmark) Maja Alm	(Russia) Natalia Gemperle	
6	Tartu, Estonia	Middle (WOC)	6 July	(Sweden) Tove Alexandersson	(Norway) Marianne Andersen	(Finland) Venla Harju	
Round 3 - Latvia
7	Cēsis, Latvia	Middle	25 August	(Russia) Natalia Gemperle	(Switzerland) Sabine Hauswirth	(Finland) Marika Teini	
8	Cēsis, Latvia	Sprint	28 August	(Sweden) Tove Alexandersson	(Russia) Natalia Gemperle	(Switzerland) Sabine Hauswirth	
Round 4 - Finals
9	Grindelwald, Switzerland	Long	29 September	(Switzerland) Elena Roos	(Switzerland) Sabine Hauswirth	(Russia) Natalia Gemperle	
10	Grindelwald, Switzerland	Middle	30 September	(Sweden) Tove Alexandersson	(Switzerland) Elena Roos	(Russia) Natalia Gemperle	

== Points distribution ==
The 40 best runners in each event are awarded points. The winner is awarded 100 points. In WC events 1 to 8, the seven best results counts in the overall classification. In the finals (WC 9 and WC 10), both results counts.

Rank	1	2	3	4	5	6	7	8	9	10	11	12	13	14	15	16	17	18	19	20	21	22	23	24	25	26	27	28	29	30	31	32	33	34	35	36	37	38	39	40
Points	100	80	60	50	45	40	37	35	33	31	30	29	28	27	26	25	24	23	22	21	20	19	18	17	16	15	14	13	12	11	10	9	8	7	6	5	4	3	2	1

== Overall standings ==
This section shows the final standings after all 10 individual events.

=== Men ===
Rank	Athlete	Points
1	(Switzerland) Matthias Kyburz	588
2	(Norway) Olav Lundanes	468
3	(Switzerland) Daniel Hubmann	463
4	(Sweden) Martin Regborn	384
5	(Czech Republic) Vojtech Kral	361
6	(Norway) Eskil Kinneberg	296
7	(France) Frederic Tranchand	296
8	(Norway) Magne Dæhli	295
9	(Sweden) Emil Svensk	274
10	(Sweden) Gustav Bergman	256

=== Women ===
Rank	Athlete	Points
1	(Sweden) Tove Alexandersson	679
2	(Russia) Natalia Gemperle	610
3	(Switzerland) Sabine Hauswirth	450
4	(Sweden) Helena Bergman	426
5	(Denmark) Maja Alm	380
6	(Switzerland) Elena Roos	363
7	(Finland) Venla Harju	334
8	(Switzerland) Julia Gross	249
9	(Sweden) Karolin Ohlsson	235
10	(Finland) Sari Anttonen	227

=== Relay ===
The table shows the final standings after all 7 relay events. The six best results counts in the overall standings, which means that each team's worst results (in brackets) does not count.

Rank	Nation	1	2	3 M	3 W	4 M	4 W	5	Points
1	Sweden	100	100	(60)	100	100	80	100	580
2	Switzerland	80	60	(45)	50	80	100	60	430
3	Norway	40	(37)	100	40	50	37	80	347
4	Russia	50	45	(40)	80	60	50	50	335
5	Finland	45	(31)	35	60	37	60	45	282
6	France	31	(28)	80	33	40	31	35	250
7	(United Kingdom) Great Britain	60	40	(26)	37	33	45	30	245
8	Denmark	35	80	33	31	24	(0)	33	236
9	Czech Republic	37	50	(30)	35	35	35	40	232
10	Latvia	(0)	29	37	45	45	40	27	223

== Achievements ==
Only individual competitions.
