= Orienteering World Cup =

International orienteering competitions

- Status: Active
- Genre: Sports event
- Date: January–October
- Frequency: Annual
- Location: Various
- Inaugurated: 1983
- Area: Europe
- Organiser: International Orienteering Federation (IOF)
- Website: orienteering.sport/worldcup-page/
- 2024 Orienteering World Cup

The Orienteering World Cup is a series of orienteering competitions organized annually by the International Orienteering Federation. Two unofficial cups were organized in 1983 and 1984. The official World Cup was held first in 1986, and then every second year up to 2004. From 2004 the World Cup has been held annually.

== Hosting nations ==
Year	Hosting nations	Notes
1986	Norway, Canada, United States, France, Sweden, (Czech Republic) Czechoslovakia, Hungary, Switzerland	8 events
1988	Hong Kong, Australia, (United Kingdom) Great Britain, Finland, (Czech Republic) Czechoslovakia, Hungary, Sweden	8 events
1990	Poland, Denmark, Norway, Canada, United States, Switzerland, France, Germany	8 events
1992	Sweden, Finland, Russia, Hungary, Austria, Italy, Canada, United States	8 events
1994	New Zealand, Australia, Norway, Denmark, Germany, Czech Republic	9 events (6 individual, 3 relays)
1996	Lithuania, Latvia, Sweden, Norway, Switzerland, France	10 events (7 individual, 3 relays)
1998	(Republic of Ireland) Ireland, (United Kingdom) Great Britain, Sweden, Poland, Slovakia, Estonia, Finland	13 events (10 individual, 3 relays).
2000	Japan, Australia, Ukraine, Finland, Portugal	12 events (9 individual, 3 relays)
2002	Belgium, Switzerland, Norway, Sweden, Hungary, Czech Republic	17 events (13 individual, 4 relays).
2004	Denmark, Sweden, Germany	12 events (9 individual, 3 relays)
2005	(United Kingdom) Great Britain, Japan, Italy	12 events (9 individual, 3 relays)
2006	Estonia, Denmark, France	12 events (9 individual, 3 relays)
2007	Finland, Norway, Sweden, Ukraine, Switzerland	10 events (all individual)
2008	Latvia, Norway, Czech Republic, Sweden, Switzerland	13 events (all individual)
2009	Finland, Norway, Hungary, Switzerland	9 events (all individual)
2010	Bulgaria, Finland, Sweden, Norway, France, Switzerland	12 events (all individual)
2011	Czech Republic, Finland, France, Norway, Sweden, Switzerland	10 events (all individual)
2012	Sweden, Switzerland, Norway, Finland	13 events (all individual)
2013	New Zealand, Norway, Sweden, Finland, Switzerland	13 events (all individual)
2014	Turkey, Spain, Portugal, Norway, Finland, Italy, Switzerland	14 events (all individual)
2015	Australia, Norway, Sweden, (United Kingdom) Great Britain, Switzerland	14 events (11 individual, 3 sprint relays)
2016	Czech Republic, Poland, Sweden, Switzerland	14 events (10 individual, 4 sprint relays)
2017	Finland, Estonia, Latvia, Switzerland	15 events (10 individual, 5 relays)
2018	Switzerland, Latvia, Norway, Czech Republic	20 events (11 individual, 9 relays)
2019	Finland, Norway, Switzerland, China	13 events (9 individual, 4 relays)
~~2020~~	~~Switzerland, Estonia, Italy~~ ^{(Events cancelled due to the COVID-19 pandemic)}	~~9 events (7 individual, 2 relays)~~
2021	Switzerland, Sweden, Italy	9 events (6 individual, 3 relays)
2022	Sweden, Estonia, Switzerland	9 events (6 individual, 3 relays)
2023	Norway, Czech Republic, Italy	10 events (7 individual, 3 relays)
2024	Switzerland, Italy, Hungary, Finland	11 events (7 individual, 4 relays)
2025	Sweden, Belgium, Switzerland	9 events (6 individual, 3 relays)
2026	Switzerland, Sweden, Czech Republic, Lithuania	12 events (8 individual, 4 relays)
2027	Sweden, Czech Republic, Switzerland, Spain	11 events (7 individual, 4 relays)

== Scoring ==
=== Individual ===
The object of the World Cup is to collect points during the season. The total score for an individual is the sum of all points scored in each competition. The 40 best runners in each individual event are awarded points, where the winner is awarded 100 points. Any runner places below 40th is not awarded points. If a tie occurs, both runners are awarded the points as if they were placed in the highest of the tied positions. As of 2024, the current points distribution are as follows:

Individual
Place	Points
1st	100
2nd	80
3rd	60
4th	50
5th	45
6th	40
7th	37
8th	35
9th	33
10th to 40th	-n + 41*

*For example, 10th place gains 31 points (-10 + 41 = 31)

KO Sprint
Race	Place	Points
Final	1st to 6th	Same as individual places 1 to 6
Semi-finals	3rd	35
Semi-finals	4th	30
Semi-finals	5th	27
Semi-finals	6th	24
Quarter-finals	4th	20
Quarter-finals	5th	14
Quarter-finals	6th	8
Qualification	13th	4
Qualification	14th	1

Runners who are not placed in any given round are awarded points for last place in the given round.

=== Team ===
The total team score is the sum of scores from both individual and relay events.

For individual races: the sum of the four best places runners, both men and women.

Relay: The individual table * 10.

Sprint relay: The table above * 20.

== World Cup overall results ==
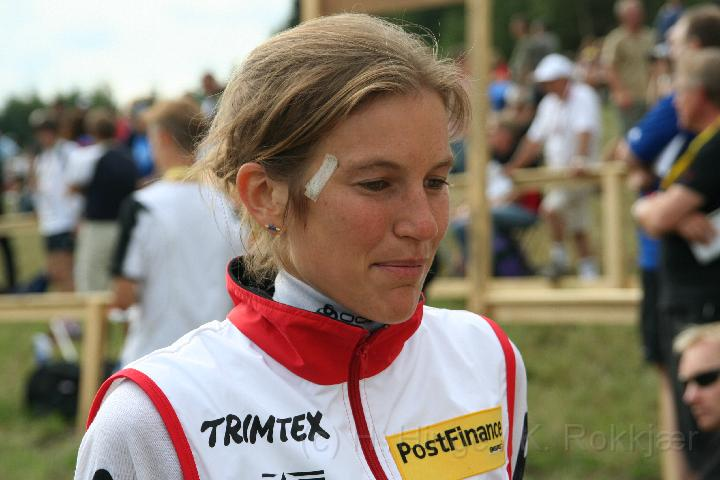
Simone Niggli-Luder, nine-time winner

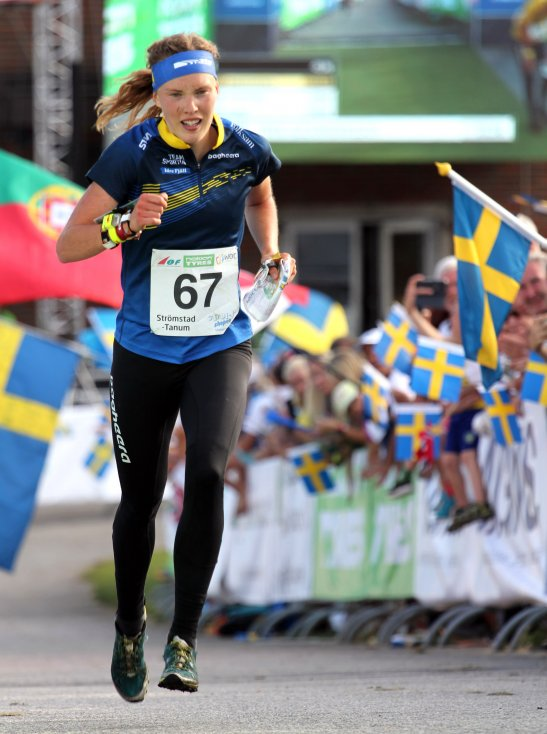
Tove Alexandersson won nine consequtive titles in 2014–2023 seasons

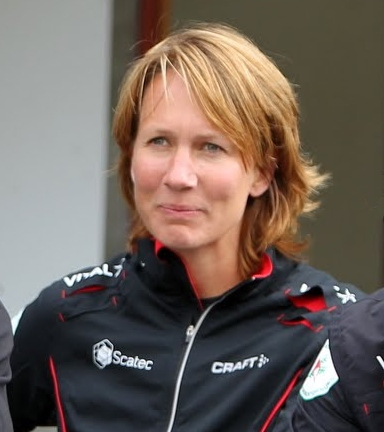
Hanne Staff won twice in 1998 and 2000

=== Women ===
Year	1st	2nd	3rd	Notes
1986	(Norway) Ellen Sofie Olsvik	(Norway) Jorunn Teigen	(Sweden) Karin Rabe	
1988	(Norway) Ragnhild Bratberg	(Norway) Brit Volden	(Czech Republic) Jana Galíková	
1990	(Norway) Ragnhild Bente Andersen	(Norway) Ragnhild Bratberg	(Sweden) Katarina Borg	
1992	(Sweden) Marita Skogum	(Czech Republic) Jana Cieslarova	(United Kingdom) Yvette Hague	
1994	(Sweden) Marlena Jansson	(United Kingdom) Yvette Hague	(Norway) Hanne Staff	
1996	(Sweden) Gunilla Svärd	(Sweden) Marlena Jansson	(Norway) Hanne Staff	
1998	(Norway) Hanne Staff	(Finland) Johanna Asklöf	(Sweden) Katarina Borg	
2000	(Norway) Hanne Staff (2)	(Switzerland) Simone Luder	(United Kingdom) Heather Monro	
2002	(Switzerland) Simone Luder	(Switzerland) Vroni König-Salmi	(Norway) Hanne Staff	
2004	(Switzerland) Simone Niggli-Luder (2)	(Russia) Tatiana Ryabkina	(Sweden) Karolina Arewång-Höjsgaard	
2005	(Switzerland) Simone Niggli-Luder (3)	(Switzerland) Vroni König-Salmi	(Norway) Anne Margrethe Hausken	
2006	(Switzerland) Simone Niggli-Luder (4)	(Norway) Marianne Andersen	(Finland) Minna Kauppi	
2007	(Switzerland) Simone Niggli-Luder (5)	(Finland) Heli Jukkola	(Finland) Minna Kauppi	
2008	(Norway) Anne Margrethe Hausken	(Finland) Minna Kauppi	(Sweden) Helena Jansson	
2009	(Switzerland) Simone Niggli-Luder (6)	(Norway) Marianne Andersen	(Sweden) Helena Jansson	
2010	(Switzerland) Simone Niggli-Luder (7)	(Sweden) Helena Jansson	(Denmark) Maja Alm	
2011	(Sweden) Helena Jansson	(Finland) Minna Kauppi	(Sweden) Lena Eliasson	
2012	(Switzerland) Simone Niggli-Luder (8)	(Finland) Minna Kauppi	(Russia) Tatiana Ryabkina	
2013	(Switzerland) Simone Niggli-Luder (9)	(Sweden) Tove Alexandersson	(Sweden) Annika Billstam	
2014	(Sweden) Tove Alexandersson	(Switzerland) Judith Wyder	(Denmark) Maja Alm	
2015	(Sweden) Tove Alexandersson (2)	(Switzerland) Sara Lüscher	(Ukraine) Nadiya Volynska	
2016	(Sweden) Tove Alexandersson (3)	(Switzerland) Judith Wyder	(Denmark) Maja Alm	
2017	(Sweden) Tove Alexandersson (4)	(Russia) Natalia Gemperle	(Switzerland) Sabine Hauswirth	
2018	(Sweden) Tove Alexandersson (5)	(Sweden) Karolin Ohlsson	(Russia) Natalia Gemperle	
2019	(Sweden) Tove Alexandersson (6)	(Switzerland) Simona Aebersold	(Russia) Natalia Gemperle	
2020	World Cup cancelled due to the COVID-19 pandemic.			
2021	(Sweden) Tove Alexandersson (7)	(Switzerland) Simona Aebersold	(Sweden) Hanna Lundberg	
2022	(Sweden) Tove Alexandersson (8)	(Switzerland) Simona Aebersold	(Norway) Andrine Benjaminsen	
2023	(Sweden) Tove Alexandersson (9)	(Sweden) Sara Hagström	(Switzerland) Simona Aebersold	
2024	(Switzerland) Simona Aebersold (1)	(Sweden) Tove Alexandersson	(Switzerland) Natalia Gemperle	
2025	(Switzerland) Simona Aebersold (2)	(Norway) Pia Young Vik	(France) Celine Calandry	

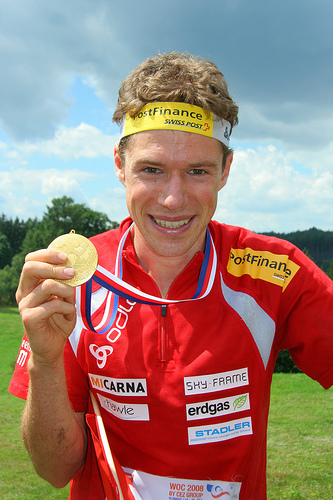
Daniel Hubmann, a six-time winner

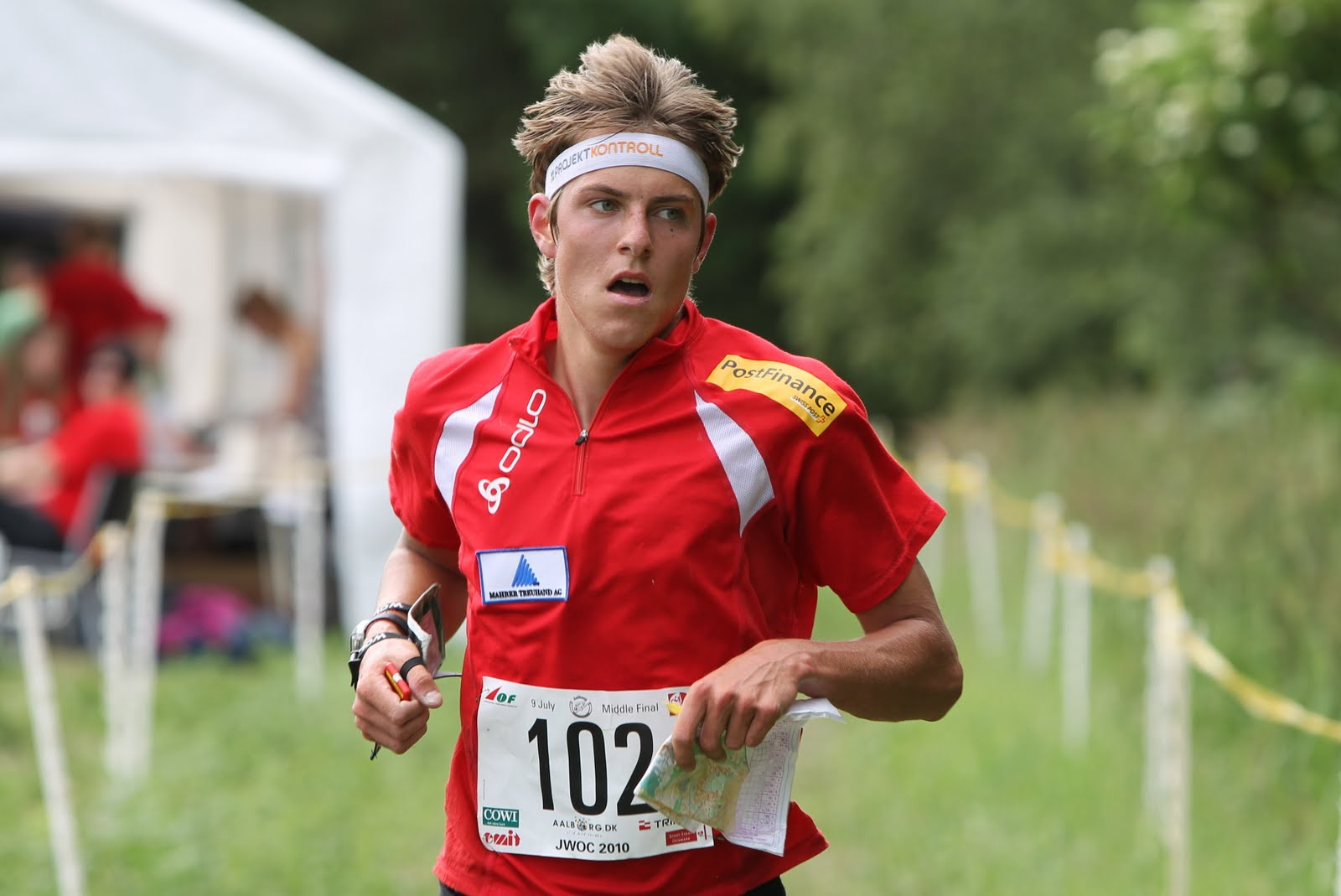
Matthias Kyburz won the title six times

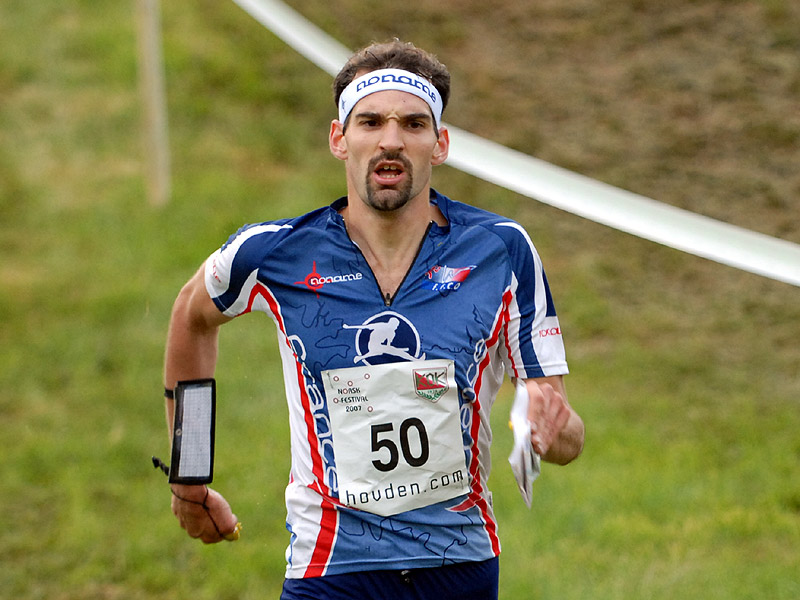
Thierry Gueorgiou, winner twice in 2006 and 2007

=== Men ===
Year	1st	2nd	3rd	Notes
1986	(Sweden) Kent Olsson	(Norway) Øyvin Thon	(Sweden) Michael Wehlin	
1988	(Norway) Øyvin Thon	(Sweden) Jörgen Mårtensson	(Norway) Håvard Tveite	
1990	(Norway) Håvard Tveite	(Sweden) Niklas Löwegren	(Sweden) Jörgen Mårtensson	
1992	(Sweden) Joakim Ingelsson	(Sweden) Martin Johansson	(Norway) Petter Thoresen	
1994	(Norway) Petter Thoresen	(Finland) Janne Salmi	(Finland) Mika Kuisma	
1996	(Sweden) Johan Ivarsson	(Sweden) Jörgen Mårtensson	(Finland) Timo Karppinen	
1998	(Denmark) Chris Terkelsen	(Sweden) Johan Ivarsson	(Norway) Bjørnar Valstad	
2000	(Finland) Jani Lakanen	(Norway) Tore Sandvik	(Denmark) Allan Mogensen	
2002	(Norway) Bjørnar Valstad	(Russia) Michael Mamleev	(Finland) Mats Haldin	
2004	(Norway) Holger Hott Johansen	(Russia) Andrey Khramov	(Norway) Øystein Kvaal Østerbø	
2005	(Russia) Andrey Khramov	(France) Thierry Gueorgiou	(Switzerland) Daniel Hubmann	
2006	(France) Thierry Gueorgiou	(Switzerland) Daniel Hubmann	(Russia) Valentin Novikov	
2007	(France) Thierry Gueorgiou (2)	(Norway) Anders Nordberg	(Switzerland) Daniel Hubmann	
2008	(Switzerland) Daniel Hubmann	(France) Thierry Gueorgiou	(Switzerland) Matthias Merz	
2009	(Switzerland) Daniel Hubmann (2)	(France) Thierry Gueorgiou	(Sweden) Peter Öberg	
2010	(Switzerland) Daniel Hubmann (3)	(Switzerland) Matthias Müller	(France) Thierry Gueorgiou	
2011	(Switzerland) Daniel Hubmann (4)	(France) Thierry Gueorgiou	(Switzerland) Matthias Merz	
2012	(Switzerland) Matthias Kyburz	(Norway) Olav Lundanes	(Switzerland) Matthias Merz	
2013	(Switzerland) Matthias Kyburz (2)	(Switzerland) Daniel Hubmann	(Switzerland) Fabian Hertner	
2014	(Switzerland) Daniel Hubmann (5)	(Switzerland) Fabian Hertner	(Switzerland) Matthias Kyburz	
2015	(Switzerland) Daniel Hubmann (6)	(Switzerland) Matthias Kyburz	(Norway) Olav Lundanes	
2016	(Switzerland) Matthias Kyburz (3)	(Switzerland) Daniel Hubmann	(Norway) Olav Lundanes	
2017	(Switzerland) Matthias Kyburz (4)	(Norway) Olav Lundanes	(Switzerland) Daniel Hubmann	
2018	(Switzerland) Matthias Kyburz (5)	(Switzerland) Daniel Hubmann	(Norway) Olav Lundanes	
2019	(Sweden) Gustav Bergman	(Switzerland) Joey Hadorn	(Switzerland) Daniel Hubmann	
2020	World Cup cancelled due to the COVID-19 pandemic.			
2021	(Norway) Kasper Fosser	(Switzerland) Matthias Kyburz	(Switzerland) Daniel Hubmann	
2022	(Norway) Kasper Fosser (2)	(Sweden) Martin Regborn	(Sweden) Gustav Bergman	
2023	(Switzerland) Matthias Kyburz (6)	(Norway) Kasper Fosser	(Sweden) Gustav Bergman	
2024	(Norway) Kasper Fosser (3)	(Sweden) Martin Regborn	(Norway) Eirik Langedal Breivik	
2025	(Sweden) Max Peter Bejmer	(Norway) Kasper Fosser	(Czech Republic) Tomas Krivda	

== Records ==
=== Most overall wins ===
The table shows all winners of the overall World Cup who achieved minimum two top 3 finishes.

- Active athletes are **bolded**.

As of 10 October 2023

==== Men ====
No.	Athlete	Wins	2nd	3rd
1	(Switzerland) **Daniel Hubmann**	6	4	5
2	(Switzerland) **Matthias Kyburz**	6	2	1
3	(France) Thierry Gueorgiou	2	4	1
4	(Norway) **Kasper Fosser**	3	1	-
5	(Norway) Øyvin Thon	1	1	-
=	(Sweden) Johan Ivarsson	1	1	-
=	(Russia) **Andrey Khramov**	1	1	-
8	(Sweden) **Gustav Bergman**	1	-	2
9	(Norway) Håvard Tveite	1	-	1
=	(Norway) Petter Thoresen	1	-	1
=	(Norway) Bjørnar Valstad	1	-	1
12	(Sweden) **Martin Regborn**	-	2	-

==== Women ====
No.	Athlete	Wins	2nd	3rd
1	(Sweden) **Tove Alexandersson**	9	2	-
2	(Switzerland) Simone Niggli	9	1	-
3	(Norway) Hanne Staff	2	-	3
4	(Switzerland) **Simona Aebersold**	1	3	1
5	(Sweden) Helena Bergman	1	1	2
6	(Switzerland) **Natalia Gemperle**	-	2	3
7	(Norway) Ragnhild Bratberg	1	1	-
=	(Sweden) Marlena Jansson	1	1	-
9	(Norway) **Anne Margrethe Hausken**	1	-	1

=== Most race victories ===
This is a list of the orienteers who have won two or more World Cup races.

- Results from the World Cup's inception in 1986 until the 1996 are incomplete.
- Active athletes are **bolded**.

As of 3 October 2022

==== Men ====
No.	Athlete	Wins
1	(Switzerland) **Daniel Hubmann**	32
2	(France) Thierry Gueorgiou	29
3	(Switzerland) **Matthias Kyburz**	23
4	(Norway) Olav Lundanes	15
5	(Sweden) Emil Wingstedt	8
6	(Sweden) Jonas Leandersson	7
7	(Norway) **Kasper Harlem Fosser**	5
8	(Switzerland) Fabian Hertner	4
=	(Finland) Pasi Ikonen	4
=	(Russia) **Andrey Khramov**	4
=	(Finland) Jani Lakanen	4
=	(Sweden) **Jerker Lysell**	4
=	(Denmark) Chris Terkelsen	4
=	(Norway) Bjørnar Valstad	4
15	(Sweden) **Gustav Bergman**	4
=	(Sweden) Johan Ivarsson	3
=	(Norway) Carl Godager Kaas	3
=	(Denmark) Allan Mogensen	3
=	(Russia) **Valentin Novikov**	3
=	(Sweden) Peter Öberg	3
21	(Finland) Tero Föhr	2
=	(Norway) Holger Hott Johansen	2
=	(Czech Republic) **Vojtěch Král**	2
=	(Ukraine) **Oleksandr Kratov**	2
=	(Russia) / (Italy) Mikhail Mamleev	2
=	(Switzerland) Matthias Müller	2
=	(Sweden) Jörgen Mårtensson	2
=	(Ukraine) Yuri Omeltchenko	2
=	(Czech Republic) Rudolf Ropek	2
=	(Finland) Janne Salmi	2
=	(Soviet Union) / (Estonia) Sixten Sild	2
=	(Norway) Audun Weltzien	2
=	(Belgium) **Yannick Michiels**	2
=	(Switzerland) **Joey Hadorn**	2

==== Women ====
No.	Athlete	Wins
1	(Switzerland) Simone Niggli	66
2	(Sweden) **Tove Alexandersson**	41
3	(Finland) Minna Kauppi	12
4	(Norway) Hanne Staff	11
5	(Norway) **Anne Margrethe Hausken**	10
6	(Sweden) Helena Bergman	9
=	(Switzerland) **Judith Wyder**	9
8	(Denmark) Maja Alm	5
=	(Sweden) Gunilla Svärd	5
10	(Sweden) Annika Billstam	4
=	(Switzerland) Vroni König-Salmi	4
12	(Denmark) Ida Bobach	3
=	(Czech Republic) Dana Brožková	3
=	(Czech Republic) Jana Cieslarova	3
=	(Sweden) Emma Claesson	3
=	(Switzerland) **Simona Aebersold**	3
17	(United Kingdom) Yvette (Hague) Baker	2
=	(Russia) **Natalia Gemperle**	2
=	(Sweden) Linnea Gustafsson	2
=	(Sweden) Marlena Jansson	2
=	(Sweden) Jenny Johansson	2
=	(Finland) Heli Jukkola	2
=	(Denmark) Emma Klingenberg	2
=	(United Kingdom) Heather Monro	2
=	(Russia) **Tatjana Rjabkina**	2
=	(Sweden) Marita Skogum	2
=	(Sweden) Sara Hagström	2

== See also ==
- International Orienteering Federation (IOF)
- World Orienteering Championships
- Junior World Orienteering Championships
- European Orienteering Championships
