= 2019 World Orienteering Championships =

2019 edition of the World Orienteering Championships

- Country: Norway
- Events: 6
- Dates: 13–17 August 2019
- Website: woc2019.no/en

The 36th World Orienteering Championships were held in Østfold, Norway in August 2019.

The competitions consisted of middle distance, long distance and relay, for women and men, respectively. Both individual women’s competitions were won by Sweden’s Tove Alexandersson. She won the long distance with a margin of six minutes ahead of Lina Strand, and the middle distance with a margin of five seconds ahead of Simona Aebersold. Norway’s Olav Lundanes won both the long and middle distances for men, ahead of Kasper Fosser and Gustav Bergman, respectively. Sweden won the women’s relay ahead of Switzerland and Russia. Sweden also won the men’s relay, ahead of Finland and France.

== Competition format ==
From 2019 the world championships are split in two (forest and park), each being held every second year. The 2019 edition is a pure "forest" format. The competitions are the middle and long distances, and relay.

== Schedule ==
Date	Event	Location
13 Aug	Middle qualification	
14 Aug	Long distance	
15 Aug	Rest day	
16 Aug	Middle distance final	
17 Aug	Relay	

== Medal summary ==
=== Men ===
Event	Gold		Silver		Bronze	
Long distance	Olav Lundanes (NOR)	1:30:09	Kasper Fosser (NOR)	1:31:48	Daniel Hubmann (SUI)	1:33:07
Middle distance	Olav Lundanes (NOR)	34:18	Gustav Bergman (SWE)	34:29	Magne Daehli (NOR)	34:47
Relay	Sweden Johan Runesson; Emil Svensk; Gustav Bergman	1:40:42	Finland Aleksi Niemi; Elias Kuukka; Miika Kirmula	1:42:16	France Nicolas Rio; Frédéric Tranchand; Lucas Basset	1:42:25

=== Women ===
Event	Gold		Silver		Bronze	
Long distance	Tove Alexandersson (SWE)	1:09:00	Lina Strand (SWE)	1:15:16	Simona Aebersold (SUI)	1:15:50
Middle distance	Tove Alexandersson (SWE)	38:20	Simona Aebersold (SUI)	38:25	Natalia Gemperle (RUS); Venla Harju (FIN)	40:05
Relay	Sweden Lina Strand; Tove Alexandersson; Karolin Ohlsson	1:35:49	Switzerland Sabine Hauswirth; Simona Aebersold; Julia Jakob	1:35:53	Russia Anastasia Rudnaya; Tatiana Ryabkina; Natalia Gemperle	1:36:56

== Results ==
=== Men's long distance ===
WOC 2019 – Long – Men (16.6 km, 26 controls)
Rank	Competitor	Nation	Time
1st place, gold medalist(s)	Olav Lundanes	Norway	1:30:09
2nd place, silver medalist(s)	Kasper Fosser	Norway	1:31:48
3rd place, bronze medalist(s)	Daniel Hubmann	Switzerland	1:33:07
4	Matthias Kyburz	Switzerland	1:33:10
5	Ruslan Glibov	Ukraine	1:33:24
6	Magne Daehli	Norway	1:35:37
7	Vojtěch Král	Czech Republic	1:36:03
8	Albin Ridefelt	Sweden	1:36:11
9	Gernot Ymsén	Austria	1:36:22
10	Frédéric Tranchand	France	1:36:28
11	Martin Hubmann	Switzerland	1:36:45
12	Gustav Bergman	Sweden	1:36:46
13	Emil Svensk	Sweden	1:37:43
14	Elias Kuukka	Finland	1:37:47
15	Timo Sild	Estonia	1:39:14
16	Miika Kirmula	Finland	1:39:55

=== Women's long distance ===
WOC 2019 – Long – Women (11.7 km, 21 controls)
Rank	Competitor	Nation	Time
1st place, gold medalist(s)	Tove Alexandersson	Sweden	1:09:00
2nd place, silver medalist(s)	Lina Strand	Sweden	1:15:16
3rd place, bronze medalist(s)	Simona Aebersold	Switzerland	1:15:50
4	Marika Teini	Finland	1:16:02
5	Sabine Hauswirth	Switzerland	1:18:26
6	Karolin Ohlsson	Sweden	1:19:14
6	Venla Harju	Finland	1:19:14
8	Julia Jakob	Switzerland	1:19:54
9	Sara Hagström	Sweden	1:20:25
9	Anastasia Rudnaya	Russia	1:20:25
11	Natalia Gemperle	Russia	1:21:10
12	Vendula Horcicková	Czech Republic	1:21:25
13	Kamilla Olaussen	Norway	1:21:34
14	Svetlana Mironova	Russia	1:21:42
15	Marianne Andersen	Norway	1:21:59
16	Denisa Kosova	Czech Republic	1:22:07

=== Women's middle final ===
WOC 2019 – Middle – Women (5.5 km, 20 controls)
Rank	Competitor	Nation	Time
1st place, gold medalist(s)	Tove Alexandersson	Sweden	38:20
2nd place, silver medalist(s)	Simona Aebersold	Switzerland	38:25
3rd place, bronze medalist(s)	Natalia Gemperle	Russia	40:05
3rd place, bronze medalist(s)	Venla Harju	Finland	40:05
5	Anne Margrethe Hausken Nordberg	Norway	40:07
6	Sabine Hauswirth	Switzerland	40:08
7	Lina Strand	Sweden	40:12
8	Denisa Kosova	Czech Republic	40:37
9	Marika Teini	Finland	41:06
10	Cecilie Friberg Klysner	Denmark	41:27
11	Merja Rantanen	Finland	41:37
12	Marianne Andersen	Norway	42:39
13	Anastasia Rudnaya	Russia	42:54
14	Karolin Ohlsson	Sweden	43:00
15	Lenka Mechlová	Czech Republic	43:15
16	Kamilla Olaussen	Norway	43:18

=== Men's middle final ===
WOC 2019 – Long – Men (6.1 km, 23 controls)
Rank	Competitor	Nation	Time
1st place, gold medalist(s)	Olav Lundanes	Norway	34:18
2nd place, silver medalist(s)	Gustav Bergman	Sweden	34:29
3rd place, bronze medalist(s)	Magne Daehli	Norway	34:47
4	Emil Svensk	Sweden	34:48
5	Lucas Basset	France	35:20
6	Frédéric Tranchand	France	36:09
7	Miika Kirmula	Finland	36:15
8	Florian Howald	Switzerland	36:29
9	Andreas Kyburz	Switzerland	36:37
10	Daniel Hubmann	Switzerland	36:48
11	Ruslan Glibov	Ukraine	36:55
12	Aleksi Niemi	Finland	36:59
13	Timo Sild	Estonia	37:12
14	Vojtěch Král	Czech Republic	37:28
15	Milos Nykodym	Czech Republic	37:53
16	Tue Lassen	Denmark	38:04
