= Amanda Falck Weber =

Danish orienteering competitor

Personal information
- Born: 1996 (age 29–30) Frederiksværk-Hundested, Denmark

Sport
- Sport: Orienteering
- Club: Tisvilde Hegn OK
Medal record
Women's orienteering
Representing Denmark
World Championships
Bronze medal – third place	2018 Riga	Mixed sprint relay

Amanda Falck Weber (born 1996) is a Danish orienteering competitor. She was born in Frederiksværk-Hundested, and resides in Aarhus. She competed at the 2018 World Orienteering Championships in Latvia, where she won a bronze medal in the mixed sprint relay, together with Tue Lassen, Jakob Edsen and Maja Alm.

She competed in the Orienteering World Cup in 2017 and 2018, and represented Denmark in the 2018 European Orienteering Championships.
