= Joakim Ingelsson =

Swedish orienteering competitor

Medal record

Men's orienteering

Representing Sweden

World Cup
Gold medal – first place	1992	WC Overall

Joakim Ingelsson (born 1963) is a Swedish orienteering competitor. He won the overall world cup in 1992. He has placed second in Jukola twice and has finished in third place as many times.

== World cup ==
Ingelsson finished first overall in the 1992 Orienteering World Cup. The cup consisted of eight races in eight countries, in North America (Toronto, Ontario, Canada and Boston, Massachusetts, USA) and Europe (Russia, Hungary, Austria, Italy, Finland and Sweden). He finished tenth overall in 1986, 10th in 1988, and 36th in 1994.
