= SkySnow =

Skyrunning discipline

SkySnow is a discipline in skyrunning that involves running on snow wearing microcrampons. The discipline hosted the first ever world championships in Andalusia, Spain, on 4–5 February 2022.

== History ==
SkySnow as a discipline was inspired by the early days of skyrunning, which often included running over snowfields and glaciers. The discipline started in 2012 with the first edition of Snow Running Sierra Nevada, hosted in Andalusia. The first World Championships was held in 2022 with 48 finishers.

== World championships ==
The SkySnow World Championships has been held since 2022. The first edition was held in Andalusia at the Sierra Nevada Ski and Mountain Resort.

=== Editions ===
Edition	Year	Nation	Vertical		Classic		details
1st	2022	Spain (Sierra Nevada)	Sierra Nevada Ski Station	4 February	Sierra Nevada Ski Station	5 February	
2nd	2024	Italy (Tarvisio)	Tarvisio	8 March	Mangart	9 March	

=== Men's Vertical ===
Year	Gold	Silver	Bronze
2022	(Italy) Luca Del Pero	(Russia) Vitalii Chernov	(Italy) Lorenzo Rota Martir
2024	(Italy) Tadei Pivk	(Spain) Diego Díaz Ortega	(Italy) Luca Del Pero

=== Women's vertical ===
Year	Gold	Silver	Bronze
2022	(Sweden) Lina El Kott Helander	(Spain) Silvia Lara Diez	(Spain) Virginia Perez Mesonero
2024	(Sweden) Tove Alexandersson	(Germany) Madlen Kappler	(Italy) Corinna Ghirardi

=== Men's classic ===
Year	Gold	Silver	Bronze
2022	(Italy) Luca Del Pero	(United States) Mike Popejoy	(Russia) Aleksei Pagnuev
2024	(Sweden) Martin Nilsson	(Italy) Luca Del Pero	(Slovenia) Timotej Becan

=== Women's classic ===
Year	Gold	Silver	Bronze
2022	(Spain) Virginia Perez Mesonero	(Portugal) Joana Soares	(Sweden) Sanna El Kott Helander
2024	(Sweden) Tove Alexandersson	(Germany) Madlen Kappler	(Italy) Corinna Ghirardi

=== Men's combined ===
Year	Gold	Silver	Bronze
2022	(Italy) Luca Del Pero	(Italy) Lorenzo Rota Martir	(Italy) Daniele Cappelletti
2024	(Italy) Luca Del Pero	(Sweden) Martin Nilsson	(Spain) Diego Díaz Ortega

=== Women's combined ===
Year	Gold	Silver	Bronze
2022	(Sweden) Lina El Kott Helander	(Spain) Virginia Perez Mesonero	(Portugal) Joana Soares
2024	(Sweden) Tove Alexandersson	(Germany) Madlen Kappler	(Italy) Corinna Ghirardi
