= Elias Kuukka =

Finnish orienteering competitor

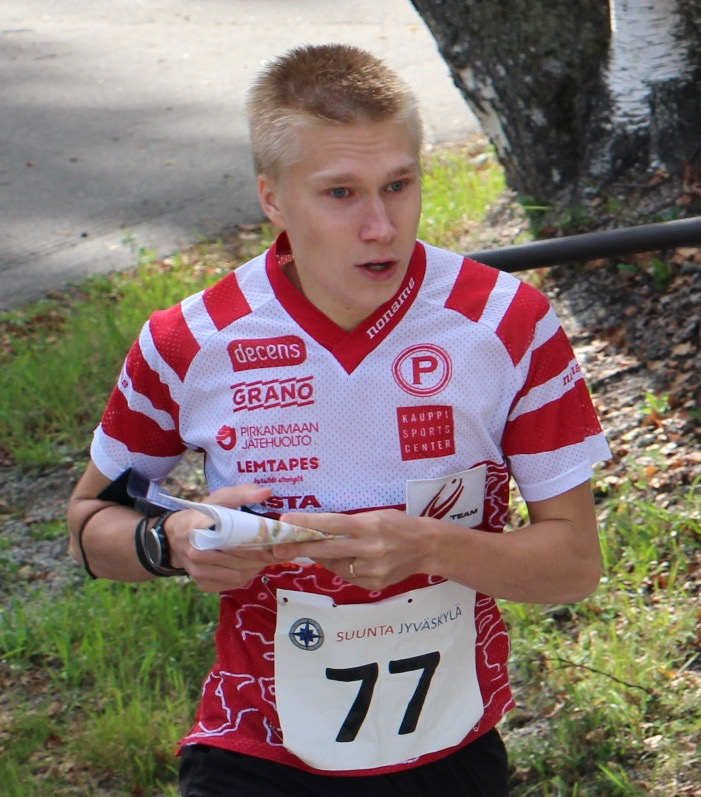

Personal information
- Nationality: Finnish
- Born: 12 February 1994 (age 32) Tampere, Finland

Sport
- Sport: Orienteering
Medal record
Representing Finland
Men's orienteering
World Championships
Silver medal – second place	2019 Østfold	Relay

Elias Kuukka (born 12 February 1994) is a Finnish orienteering competitor, born in Tampere. He competed at the 2019 World Orienteering Championships in Østfold, where placed 14th in the long distance, and won a silver medal with the Finnish relay team, along with Aleksi Niemi and Miika Kirmula.
