= Joey Hadorn =

Swiss orienteering competitor (born 1997)

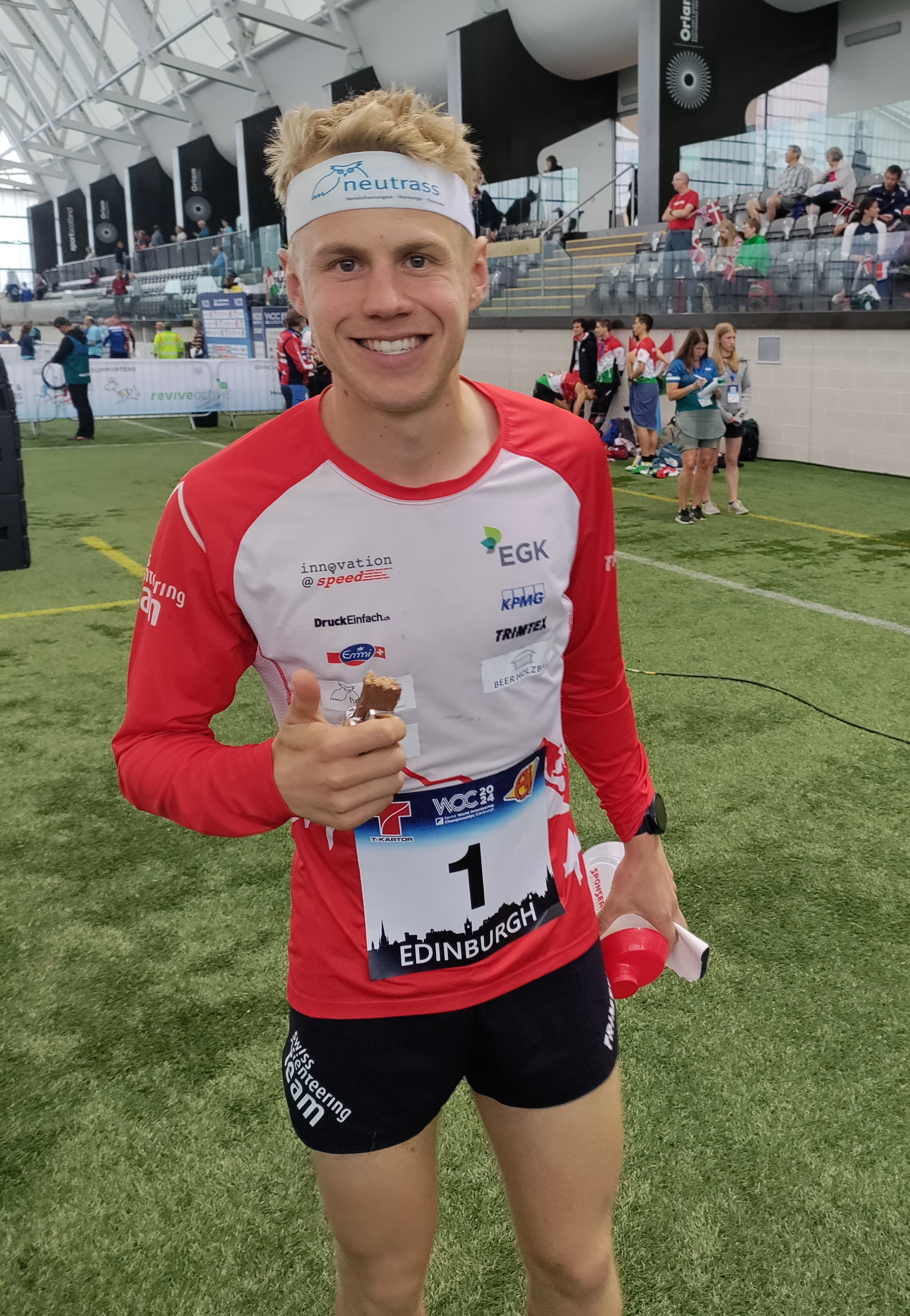
- Joey Hadorn at the 2024 World Orienteering Championships

Personal information
- Nationality: Swiss
- Born: 11 April 1997 (age 29) Bern, Switzerland

Sport
- Sport: Orienteering
Medal record
Representing Switzerland
Men's orienteering
World Championships
Gold medal – first place	2023 Flims Laax	Relay
Gold medal – first place	2024 Edinburgh	Sprint relay
Silver medal – second place	2023 Flims Laax	Middle
Bronze medal – third place	2021 Doksy	Sprint relay
European Championships
Gold medal – first place	2021 Neuchâtel	Sprint relay
Silver medal – second place	2021 Neuchâtel	Knock-out Sprint
Silver medal – second place	2021 Trentino	Sprint relay
World Games
Gold medal – first place	2022 Birmingham	Mixed sprint relay
World Cup
Silver medal – second place	2019	World Cup Overall
Junior World Championships
Gold medal – first place	2016 Engadin	Long
Gold medal – first place	2016 Engadin	Sprint
Gold medal – first place	2016 Engadin	Relay
Silver medal – second place	2016 Engadin	Middle
Bronze medal – third place	2017 Tampere	Sprint

Joey Hadorn (born 11 April 1997) is a Swiss orienteering competitor.

== Life ==
He was born in Bern.

== Career ==
=== Junior years 2016–2017 ===
Hadorn won three gold medals at the 2016 Junior World Orienteering Championships in Engadin, in the long distance, sprint and relay respectively, and a silver medal in the middle distance. At the 2017 Junior World Orienteering Championships, he won a bronze medal in sprint.

=== 2018–2019 ===
He became Swiss champion in middle distance in 2018. His achievements at the 2019 Orienteering World Cup include a victory in the middle distance and a second place in knockout sprint in Laufen, Switzerland, and a second place in the middle distance at the world cup final in China.

=== 2023 ===
Hadorn won a silver medal in the middle distance at the 2023 World Orienteering Championships held in Switzerland, and was also part of the Swiss relay team winning the gold medals.

=== 2024 ===
Competing at the 2024 World Orienteering Championships in Edinburgh, he ran the third leg for Switzerland in the mixed sprint relay, and won the gold medal with the Swiss team, which also included Natalia Gemperle, Riccardo Rancan and Simona Aebersold. He also qualified for the final in the knockout sprint at the world championships, where he placed fourth, 0.2 seconds from the bronze medal.

== Results ==
=== World Cup victories ===
No.	Date	Venue	Distance
1	27 September 2019	(Switzerland) Laufen	Middle distance
