= Aleksi Niemi =

Finnish orienteering competitor

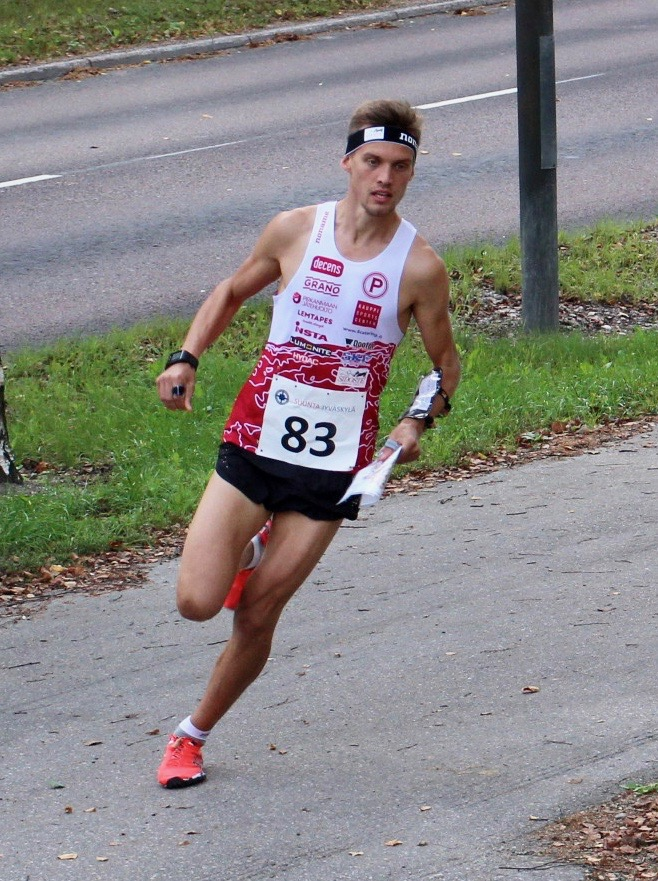

Personal information
- Nationality: Finnish
- Born: 12 April 1995 (age 31) Tampere, Finland

Sport
- Sport: Orienteering
Medal record
Representing Finland
Men's orienteering
World Championships
Silver medal – second place	2019 Østfold	Relay
Junior World Championships
Gold medal – first place	2015 Rauland	Relay
Silver medal – second place	2015 Rauland	Sprint

Aleksi Niemi (born 12 April 1995) is a Finnish orienteering competitor, born in Tampere. He competed at the 2019 World Orienteering Championships in Østfold, where he placed 12th in the middle final, and won a silver medal with the Finnish relay team, along with Elias Kuukka and Miika Kirmula. He won a silver medal in sprint at the 2015 Junior World Orienteering Championships in Rauland, and a gold medal in the relay with the Finnish team.
