= Max Peter Bejmer =

Swedish orienteering competitor

Personal information
- Born: 3 June 1992 (age 34)

Sport
- Sport: Orienteering
Medal record
Men's orienteering
Representing Sweden
World Championships
| Gold medal – first place | 2022 Triangle Region | Sprint Relay |
World Cup
| Gold medal – first place | 2025 | WC Overall |

Max Peter Bejmer (born 3 June 1992) is a Swedish orienteering competitor and world champion. He won a gold medal in the mixed sprint relay at the 2022 World Orienteering Championships.

Bejmer represents IFK Göteborg Orientering. He won the Jukola relay with them in 2017.
