= Nicolas Rio =

French orienteering competitor

Personal information
- Born: April 22, 1995 (age 31) Vénissieux, France

Sport
- Sport: Orienteering
- Club: Orient'Express 42 (FRA); Pan Kristianstad (SWE)
Medal record
Men's orienteering
Representing France
World Championships
Bronze medal – third place	2018 Latvia	Relay
Bronze medal – third place	2019 Østfold	Relay

Nicolas Rio (born 1995) is a French orienteering competitor. He was born in Vénissieux, and resides in Lyon.

He won a bronze medal in the relay at the 2018 World Orienteering Championships in Latvia, together with Lucas Basset and Frederic Tranchand. He also competed in the 2016 and 2017 World Orienteering Championships.
