= Matthias Kyburz =

Swiss athlete

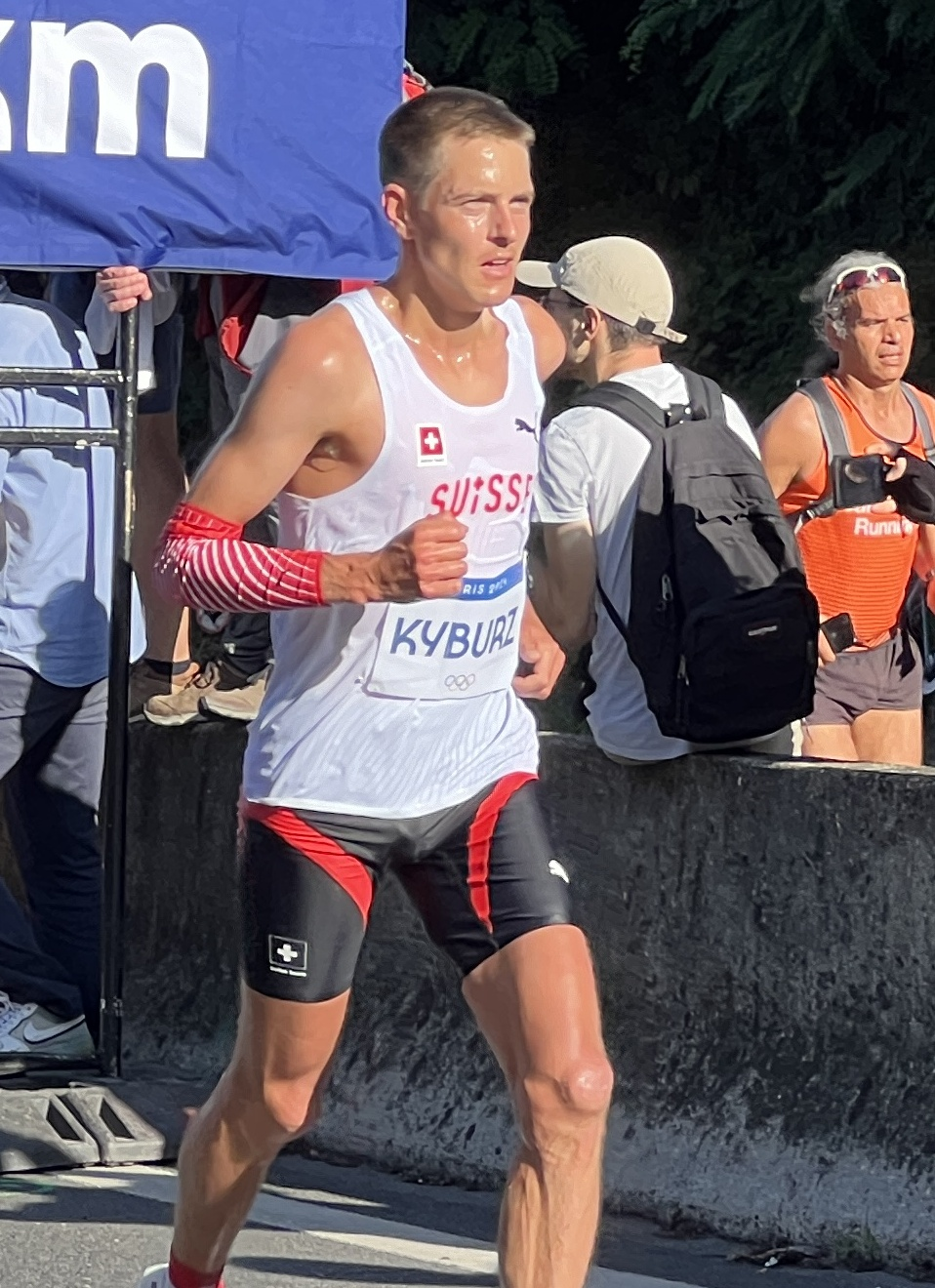
- Kyburz competing at the 2024 Summer Olympics

Personal information
- Born: 5 March 1990 (age 36) Rheinfelden District, Switzerland
- Height: 5 ft 11 in (180 cm)

Sport
- Sport: Orienteering; Athletics
- Event: Marathon
- Club: OLK Fricktal, IL Tyrving
- Coached by: Viktor Röthlin

Achievements and titles
- Personal bests: Marathon: 2:06:48 (Sevilla 2025); Half marathon: 1:01:29 (Berlin 2026)
Medal record
Men's orienteering
Representing Switzerland
World Championships
Gold medal – first place	2012 Lausanne	Sprint
Gold medal – first place	2014 Trentino-Veneto	Mixed sprint relay
Gold medal – first place	2015 Inverness	Relay
Gold medal – first place	2016 Strömstad/Tanum	Middle
Gold medal – first place	2021 Doksy	Middle
Gold medal – first place	2022 Triangle region	Knock Out
Gold medal – first place	2023 Flims-Laax	Middle
Gold medal – first place	2023 Flims-Laax	Relay
Silver medal – second place	2014 Trentino-Veneto	Relay
Silver medal – second place	2016 Strömstad/Tanum	Relay
Silver medal – second place	2016 Strömstad/Tanum	Sprint
Silver medal – second place	2018 Riga	Relay
Silver medal – second place	2021 Doksy	Long
Silver medal – second place	2023 Grisons	Long
Silver medal – second place	2023 Flims-Laax	Long
Silver medal – second place	2025 Kuopio	Relay
Bronze medal – third place	2021 Doksy	Relay
Bronze medal – third place	2025 Kuopio	Long
World Cup
Gold medal – first place	2012	WC Overall
Gold medal – first place	2013	WC Overall
Gold medal – first place	2016	WC Overall
Gold medal – first place	2017	WC Overall
Gold medal – first place	2018	WC Overall
Gold medal – first place	2023	WC Overall
Silver medal – second place	2015	WC Overall
Silver medal – second place	2021	WC Overall
Bronze medal – third place	2014	WC Overall
World Games
Gold medal – first place	2013 Cali	Sprint
Gold medal – first place	2013 Cali	Middle
Gold medal – first place	2013 Cali	Mixed sprint relay
Gold medal – first place	2017 Wrocław	Middle
Gold medal – first place	2022 Birmingham	Mixed sprint relay
Silver medal – second place	2017 Wrocław	Relay
Silver medal – second place	2022 Birmingham	Individual
Bronze medal – third place	2017 Wrocław	Sprint
European Championships
Gold medal – first place	2012 Falun	Relay
Gold medal – first place	2016 Jesenik	Sprint
Gold medal – first place	2016 Jesenik	Middle
Gold medal – first place	2018 Cadempino	Sprint
Gold medal – first place	2018 Cadempino	Middle
Gold medal – first place	2021 Neuchâtel	Knock Out Sprint
Gold medal – first place	2021 Neuchâtel	Sprint Relay
Silver medal – second place	2018 Cadempino	Long
Silver medal – second place	2018 Cadempino	Relay
Junior World Championships
Gold medal – first place	2009 Primiero	Sprint
Silver medal – second place	2009 Primiero	Relay
Bronze medal – third place	2008 Gothenburg	Long
Bronze medal – third place	2010 Aalborg	Long
World Military Games
Gold medal – first place	2015 South Korea	Long
Bronze medal – third place	2015 South Korea	Middle

Matthias Kyburz (born 5 March 1990) is a Swiss long-distance runner who competes in the marathon, and a former world champion in international orienteering. On 7 April 2024 Kyburz ran 2:07:44 in his Marathon debut, becoming the third fastest Swiss athlete of all time over the distance after Tadesse Abraham and his coach Viktor Röthlin, and achieving the qualifying standard for the 2024 Olympic Games. In the Olympic marathon, Kyburz finished in 30th place. In orienteering, Kyburz has won eight gold medals at the World Orienteering Championships, making him the fourth most successful male orienteer in history by number of gold medals won at world championships at the time of his retirement in 2025.

== Career ==
=== Orienteering ===
Kyburz won a bronze medal in the Long Distance at the 2008 Junior World Orienteering Championships in Gothenburg, Sweden before achieving his only gold medal in the Sprint distance in 2009, and a bronze medal in his last year of eligibility in 2010. Following this, Kyburz took two years to win his first gold medal in the World Championships, winning the sprint distance at the 2012 World Orienteering Championships in Lausanne, ahead of Matthias Merz and Matthias Müller.

Following his 2012 success in the Sprint, Kyburz became an important competitor on the world stage, an all round orienteer with the ability to win any of the three individual orienteering disciplines. This has allowed him to win the Orienteering World Cup on six occasions: 2012, 2013, 2016, 2017, 2018 and 2023. For eleven years in a row (2008 to 2018) one of the two Swiss orienteers Matthias Kyburz or Daniel Hubmann won the Orienteering World Cup.

Kyburz has won eight World Orienteering Championships gold medals in five different disciplines: Sprint (2012, Lausanne), Sprint Relay (2014, Trentino), Knock Out Sprint (2022, Vejle), Relay (2015, Inverness and 2023, Flims-Laax) and Middle (2016, Strömstad, 2021, Doksy and 2023, Flims-Laax).

Kyburz has also won European Orienteering Championships gold medals in five different disciplines: Relay (2012), Sprint Relay (2021), Sprint (2016, 2018 and 2023), Knock Out Sprint (2021 and 2023), and Middle (2016 and 2018). Kyburz has won eight World Games medals of which three were gold in Cali 2013, one of each color at The World Games 2017, and a gold and a silver in 2022.

2023 was the best season for Kyburz, where he won the 2023 Orienteering World Cup, two gold medals and one silver medal at the 2023 World Orienteering Championships, and two gold medals and one silver medal at the European Orienteering Championships.

Following the introduction of the Knock-out sprint format in the 2021 orienteering season, Kyburz won every international event in the format until 2023, including in the 2021 European Orienteering Championships, the 2022 Orienteering World Cup and 2022 World Orienteering Championships, and the 2023 European Orienteering Championships.

Kyburz was not present at the 2024 World Orienteering Championships due to a focus on the 2024 Summer Olympics. Kyburz retired from international orienteering following the 2025 Orienteering World Cup final.

=== Athletics ===
Kyburz attained the world record in 50 km on a treadmill of 2:56:35 on 16 April 2020, breaking a record held by Florian Neuschwander. On 26 July 2020, Kyburz broke the course record in the K43-M category at the Swiss Alpine Marathon by 10 minutes, over 42.7 kilometers and 1324 meters of climb. Kyburz also won the Bern Grand Prix over 10 miles in 2022.

In around 2014, a sports doctor reportedly told Kyburz following a performance test that his test results were optimal for marathon running. The same doctor also had former World Championship bronze medallist Viktor Röthlin on his list of patients, and apparently told Röthlin that there was an orienteering competitor that had better results than either Röthlin or Tadesse Abraham. Following a successful 2023 orienteering season, Kyburz called Röthlin and asked Röthlin to coach him for the 2024 Paris Marathon in an attempt to beat the Olympic qualifying time.

In 2024, during his preparation for the Paris Marathon, Kyburz won the Swiss Championships in the Half Marathon in a time of 1:02:25, breaking his personal best by six minutes.

On 7 April 2024 Kyburz finished 7th in the Paris Marathon in a time of 2:07:44, within the qualification standard of 2:08:10 for the 2024 Paris Olympic Games.

On 9 June 2024, Kyburz came 21st at the 2024 European Athletics Championships in the half marathon in Rome in a time of 1:03:07.

In the Olympic Marathon, Kyburz finished in 30th place.

In 2025, Kyburz overtook his coach Viktor Röthlin as the second fastest Swiss in the marathon, with a time of 2:06:48 at the Sevilla Marathon. On 2 November, Kyburz came fifth in the 2025 New York City Marathon in a time of 2:09:55.

== Personal life ==
His brother, Andreas Kyburz, is also an international orienteering competitor. Kyburz has a child with fellow orienteer Sarina born in January 2024. As of 2017, Kyburz lived in Möhlin.

== Orienteering results ==
=== World Championship results ===
Year
Year	Age	Long	Middle	Sprint	Relay	Sprint; Relay	Knock Out; Sprint
2011	21	—	—	20	—	—N/a	—N/a
2012	22	19	—	1	—	—N/a	—N/a
2013	23	—	4	5	4	—N/a	—N/a
2014	24	5	—	5	2	1	—N/a
2015	25	6	40	—	1	4	—N/a
2016	26	7	1	2	2	—	—N/a
2017	27	DSQ	10	4	5	—	—N/a
2018	28	8	4	5	2	—	—N/a
2019	29	4	18	—N/a	—	—N/a	—N/a
2021	31	2	1	8	3	—	—N/a
2022	32	—N/a	—N/a	7	—N/a	4	1
2023	33	2	1	—N/a	1	—N/a	—N/a
2024	34	2024 Summer Olympics; did not compete					
2025	35	3	4	—N/a	2	—N/a	—N/a

=== World Cup victories ===
No.	Date	Venue	Distance
1	16 June 2011	(Finland) Porvoo	Sprint
2	23 June 2012	(Switzerland) St. Gallen	Middle Distance
3	14 July 2012	(Switzerland) Lausanne	Sprint (WOC)
4	4 September 2012	(Sweden) Gothenburg	Knock-Out Sprint
5	8 September 2012	(Finland) Vuokatti	Middle Distance (p)
6	7 January 2013	(New Zealand) Wellington	Sprint
7	1 June 2013	(Norway) Oslo	Sprint
8	7 June 2013	(Finland) Turku	Sprint
9	6 October 2013	(Switzerland) Baden	Sprint
10	3 January 2015	(Australia) Tasmania	Sprint
11	10 January 2015	(Australia) Tasmania	Long Distance
12	4 June 2015	(Norway) Halden	Long Distance
13	1 May 2016	(Poland) Wrocław	Long Distance
14	22 May 2016	(Czech Republic) Jeseník	Sprint (EOC)
15	27 May 2016	(Czech Republic) Jeseník	Middle Distance (EOC)
16	23 August 2016	(Sweden) Tanum	Middle Distance (EOC)
17	15 October 2016	(Switzerland) Aarau	Long Distance
18	29 September 2017	(Switzerland) Grindelwald	Long Distance
19	30 September 2017	(Switzerland) Grindelwald	Middle Distance
20	6 May 2018	(Switzerland) Ticino	Sprint
21	9 May 2018	(Switzerland) Tessin	Middle Distance
22	15 May 2021	(Switzerland) Neuchâtel	Knock-Out Sprint (EOC)
23	28 May 2022	(Sweden) Borås	Knock-Out Sprint
24	4 October 2023	(Italy) Verona	Sprint
25	8 October 2023	(Italy) Verona	Knock-Out Sprint

- (p) = pursuit
