= Sari Anttonen =

Finnish orienteering competitor

Personal information
- Born: 15 November 1991 (age 34)

Sport
- Sport: Orienteering
Medal record
Women's orienteering
Representing Finland
World Championships
Bronze medal – third place	2016 Strömstad	Relay

Sari Anttonen (born 15 November 1991) is a Finnish orienteering competitor. At the 2016 World Orienteering Championships in Strömstad she won a bronze medal with the Finnish relay team, along with Marika Teini and Merja Rantanen.
