= Tove Alexandersson =

Swedish orienteer (born 1992)

- Tove Alexandersson at Kendal Mountain Festival 2026, UK.

Personal information
- Born: Tove Malin Frida Alexandersson; 7 September 1992 (age 34) Borlänge, Dalarna County, Sweden

Sport
- Sport: Orienteering; Ski orienteering; Skyrunning; Ski mountaineering; Trail running; SkySnow
- Club: Stora Tuna OK; Alfta-Ösa OK
Medal record
Representing Sweden
Women's orienteering
World Championships
| Gold medal – first place | 2016 Strömstad–Tanum | Middle |
| Gold medal – first place | 2016 Strömstad–Tanum | Long |
| Gold medal – first place | 2017 Tartu | Middle |
| Gold medal – first place | 2017 Tartu | Long |
| Gold medal – first place | 2017 Tartu | Relay |
| Gold medal – first place | 2018 Riga | Mixed sprint relay |
| Gold medal – first place | 2018 Riga | Long |
| Gold medal – first place | 2019 Østfold | Long |
| Gold medal – first place | 2019 Østfold | Middle |
| Gold medal – first place | 2019 Østfold | Relay |
| Gold medal – first place | 2021 Doksy | Sprint |
| Gold medal – first place | 2021 Doksy | Mixed sprint relay |
| Gold medal – first place | 2021 Doksy | Middle |
| Gold medal – first place | 2021 Doksy | Relay |
| Gold medal – first place | 2021 Doksy | Long |
| Gold medal – first place | 2022 Triangle region | Mixed sprint relay |
| Gold medal – first place | 2022 Triangle region | Knock out sprint |
| Gold medal – first place | 2023 Flims-Lax | Middle |
| Gold medal – first place | 2023 Flims-Lax | Relay |
| Gold medal – first place | 2024 Edinburgh | Sprint |
| Gold medal – first place | 2024 Edinburgh | Knock out sprint |
| Gold medal – first place | 2025 Kuopio | Middle |
| Gold medal – first place | 2025 Kuopio | Relay |
| Silver medal – second place | 2012 Lausanne | Middle |
| Silver medal – second place | 2012 Lausanne | Relay |
| Silver medal – second place | 2013 Vuokatti | Middle |
| Silver medal – second place | 2013 Vuokatti | Long |
| Silver medal – second place | 2014 Trentino–Veneto | Sprint |
| Silver medal – second place | 2014 Trentino–Veneto | Long |
| Silver medal – second place | 2018 Riga | Sprint |
| Silver medal – second place | 2018 Riga | Relay |
| Silver medal – second place | 2023 Flims-Lax | Long |
| Silver medal – second place | 2025 Kuopio | Long |
| Bronze medal – third place | 2011 Savoie | Relay |
| Bronze medal – third place | 2014 Trentino–Veneto | Middle |
| Bronze medal – third place | 2014 Trentino–Veneto | Relay |
World Games
| Silver medal – second place | 2013 Cali | Middle |
World Cup
| Gold medal – first place | 2014 | WC Overall |
| Gold medal – first place | 2015 | WC Overall |
| Gold medal – first place | 2016 | WC Overall |
| Gold medal – first place | 2017 | WC Overall |
| Gold medal – first place | 2018 | WC Overall |
| Gold medal – first place | 2019 | WC Overall |
| Gold medal – first place | 2021 | WC Overall |
| Gold medal – first place | 2022 | WC Overall |
| Gold medal – first place | 2023 | WC Overall |
| Silver medal – second place | 2013 | WC Overall |
| Silver medal – second place | 2024 | WC Overall |
European Championships
| Gold medal – first place | 2016 Jeseník | Middle |
| Gold medal – first place | 2016 Jeseník | Long |
| Gold medal – first place | 2018 Ticino | Sprint |
| Gold medal – first place | 2018 Ticino | Long |
| Gold medal – first place | 2021 Neuchâtel | Sprint |
| Gold medal – first place | 2022 Rakvere | Relay |
| Gold medal – first place | 2024 Mór | Long |
| Silver medal – second place | 2016 Jeseník | Relay |
| Silver medal – second place | 2018 Ticino | Middle |
| Silver medal – second place | 2022 Rakvere | Long |
| Bronze medal – third place | 2012 Falun | Relay |
| Bronze medal – third place | 2014 Palmela | Middle |
Junior World Championships
| Gold medal – first place | 2009 Trentino | Middle |
| Gold medal – first place | 2010 Aalborg | Middle |
| Gold medal – first place | 2011 Wejherowo | Relay |
| Gold medal – first place | 2012 Kosice | Sprint |
| Gold medal – first place | 2012 Kosice | Middle |
| Silver medal – second place | 2011 Wejherowo | Middle |
| Silver medal – second place | 2012 Kosice | Relay |
| Bronze medal – third place | 2011 Wejherowo | Long |
Women's ski-orienteering
World Championships
| Gold medal – first place | 2011 Tänndalen | Sprint |
| Gold medal – first place | 2013 Ridder | Sprint |
| Gold medal – first place | 2013 Ridder | Sprint Relay |
| Gold medal – first place | 2015 Hamar/Løten | Sprint |
| Gold medal – first place | 2015 Hamar/Løten | Relay |
| Gold medal – first place | 2017 Krasnoyarsk | Sprint |
| Gold medal – first place | 2017 Krasnoyarsk | Middle |
| Gold medal – first place | 2017 Krasnoyarsk | Relay |
| Gold medal – first place | 2019 Piteå | Sprint |
| Gold medal – first place | 2019 Piteå | Long |
| Silver medal – second place | 2013 Ridder | Relay |
| Silver medal – second place | 2019 Piteå | Relay |
| Silver medal – second place | 2019 Piteå | Middle |
| Bronze medal – third place | 2013 Ridder | Long |
Junior World Championships
| Silver medal – second place | 2009 Dalarna | Long |
| Silver medal – second place | 2009 Dalarna | Middle |
Skyrunning
World Championships
| Gold medal – first place | 2018 Kinlochleven | Sky |
Ski mountaineering
World Championships (Note: Ski Mountaineering World Championships are held odd years and European Championships even years)
| Gold medal – first place | 2021 La Massana | Combined |
| Gold medal – first place | 2025 Morgins | Individual |
| Silver medal – second place | 2021 La Massana | Individual |
| Silver medal – second place | 2025 Morgins | Vertical |
| Bronze medal – third place | 2021 La Massana | Vertical |
European Championships
| Gold medal – first place | 2024 Flaine | Individual |
World Cup
| Silver medal – second place | 2021 | Combined |
Trail running
World Championships
| Gold medal – first place | 2025 Canfranc | Short Trail individual |
| Gold medal – first place | 2025 Canfranc | Short Trail team |
| Silver medal – second place | 2023 Innsbruck | Up and Down |
SkySnow
World Championships
| Gold medal – first place | 2024 Tarvisio | Vertical |
| Gold medal – first place | 2024 Tarvisio | Classic |
| Gold medal – first place | 2024 Tarvisio | Combined |

Tove Alexandersson (born 7 September 1992) is a Swedish foot orienteer, ski orienteer, skyrunner, trail runner, ski mountaineer and skysnow runner. Alexandersson has won gold medals at world championships in six different sports, and has won a total of 23 gold medals at the World Orienteering Championships, making her the most successful female orienteer in history by number of gold medals at the World Championships along with Simone Niggli-Luder. Alexandersson holds the record for the number of gold medals in a row at the World Orienteering Championships, winning 11 in a row between 2018 and 2022.

In addition to her success in orienteering, Alexandersson has excelled in multiple other sports. Alexandersson has won 10 gold medals at the World Ski Orienteering Championships, and in 2018, she won the Sky Marathon event at the Skyrunning World Championships, in her second skyrunning race ever. In 2021, she won the combined discipline at the World Championships of Ski Mountaineering, and in 2023 she won a gold medal in the short trail discipline at the World Mountain and Trail Running Championships. In 2024 Alexandersson won all three events in the SkySnow World Championships in her first such event ever. She competes for Stora Tuna OK in orienteering and Alfta-Ösa OK in ski orienteering.

== Orienteering ==
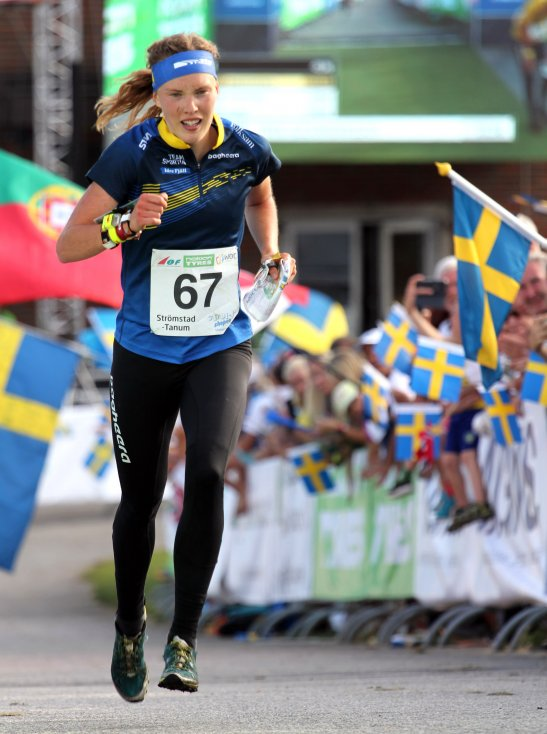
Tove Alexandersson in 2016

=== Junior World Championships ===
Alexandersson became Middle Distance Junior World Champion in orienteering in 2009. She was 16 years old at the time, running against competitors up to four years older than her. She maintained her Middle Distance title in both 2010 and 2012, with two further gold medals in the sprint and in the relay, two silvers, and one bronze in the long distance.

=== World Orienteering Championships ===
After her success as a junior prodigy Alexandersson took several years to achieve her gold medal, receiving only silvers and bronzes in 2011, 2012, 2013, 2014 and 2015 despite being one of the favourites.

She made her breakthrough in 2016, a season which saw her take #1 in the world ranking as well as dominate in the Orienteering World Cup and the World Orienteering Championships, where she won both individual forest titles.

In 2017 she continued to dominate at the 2017 World Orienteering Championships in Estonia, where she won all forest classes (Middle, Long and Relay).

In the 2018 WOC she won the silver medal in sprint and the gold medal in mixed sprint relay.

In the 2019 WOC she won the gold medals in the long and middle distances and also participated in the winning Swedish relay team together with Lina Strand and Karolin Ohlsson.

In the 2021 WOC she won gold in all five events and became the first person to win five gold medals in a single championship. Alexandersson set a record for the number of gold medals in World Orienteering Championships in a row won, winning eleven in a row for four years between 2018 and 2022, before finally coming sixth place in the sprint at the 2022 World Orienteering Championships following several errors.

By winning gold medals both in the sprint and in the knock-out sprint at the 2024 World Orienteering Championships in Edinburgh, she brought her count up to 21 gold medals in the world orienteering championships. At the 2025 World Orienteering Championships, Alexandersson won the middle distance, bringing her total number of gold medals to 22, only one behind the record held by Simone Niggli-Luder. At the Long Distance, Alexandersson nearly won the championship but ended up being second place by nine seconds behind Simona Aebersold. By winning the relay with Hanna Lundberg and Sanna Fast, Alexandersson finally equalled Niggli's record of gold medals. With more silver medals than Niggli, Alexandersson is now the most decorated orienteer of all time.

She also won the Venla Relay in 2018 together with Julia Gross, Anna Mårsell and Magdalena Olsson.

=== World Championship results ===
Year
| Year | Age | Forest events | | | Urban events | | |
| Year | Age | Long | Middle | Relay | Sprint | Knockout; Sprint | Sprint; Relay |
| 2011 | 18 | — | — | Bronze | — | —N/a | —N/a |
| 2012 | 19 | — | Silver | Silver | — | —N/a | —N/a |
| 2013 | 20 | Silver | Silver | 4 | — | —N/a | —N/a |
| 2014 | 21 | Silver | Bronze | Bronze | Silver | —N/a | — |
| 2015 | 22 | 4 | — | — | — | —N/a | — |
| 2016 | 23 | Gold | Gold | 5 | — | —N/a | — |
| 2017 | 24 | Gold | Gold | Gold | — | —N/a | — |
| 2018 | 25 | Gold | DSQ | Silver | Silver | —N/a | Gold |
| 2019 | 26 | Gold | Gold | Gold | —N/a | —N/a | —N/a |
| 2021 | 28 | Gold | Gold | Gold | Gold | —N/a | Gold |
| 2022 | 29 | —N/a | —N/a | —N/a | 6 | Gold | Gold |
| 2023 | 30 | Silver | Gold | Gold | —N/a | —N/a | —N/a |
| 2024 | 31 | —N/a | —N/a | —N/a | Gold | Gold | |
| 2025 | 32 | Silver | Gold | Gold | —N/a | —N/a | —N/a |

=== Orienteering World Cup ===
Alexandersson won the Orienteering World Cup nine times in a row from 2014 to 2023 (there was no World Cup in 2020 due to the COVID-19 pandemic).

=== European Orienteering Championships ===
Year
| Year | Age | Forest events | | | Urban events | | |
| Year | Age | Long | Middle | Relay | Sprint | Knockout; Sprint | Sprint; Relay |
| 2012 | 19 | 4 | 5 | Bronze | — | —N/a | —N/a |
| 2014 | 21 | 16 | Bronze | — | — | —N/a | —N/a |
| 2016 | 23 | Gold | Gold | Silver | — | —N/a | — |
| 2018 | 25 | Gold | Silver | — | Gold | —N/a | — |
| 2021 | 28 | —N/a | —N/a | —N/a | Gold | —N/a | — |
| 2022 | 29 | Silver | 14 | Gold | —N/a | —N/a | —N/a |
| 2023 | 30 | —N/a | —N/a | —N/a | Silver | —N/a | Gold |
| 2024 | 31 | Gold | 4 | Bronze | —N/a | —N/a | —N/a |
| 2026 | 33 | Gold | 39 | Gold | —N/a | —N/a | —N/a |

== Ski orienteering ==
She won a gold medal in the sprint distance at the 2011 World Ski Orienteering Championships in Sweden. In 2015, she once again won the women's World Ski Orienteering Championships (WSOC) sprint distance event. Alexandersson is one of the few orienteers who participates in both ski orienteering and the more popular foot orienteering. Alexandersson has been dominant in ski orienteering in recent years; at the championships in Russia in 2017 she won three gold medals. In December 2018, Alexandersson became the first athlete to be ranked #1 in three separate disciplines by the International Orienteering Federation (SkiO, FootO Sprint, and FootO Middle and Long).

== Skyrunning, Trail running and SkySnow ==
In 2017 Alexandersson took a surprise victory in the 29 kilometer Limone Extreme SkyRace with a margin of 12 minutes ahead of established skyrunning specialists, and despite taking several downhill running falls that required medical attention to arms, hands and legs.

In September 2018 Alexandersson won a gold medal in the Sky discipline of the biennial Skyrunning World Championships held on the Ring of Steall Skyrace course at Kinlochleven in Scotland. She won by more than seven minutes, setting a new course record by 19 minutes on the demanding and technical 29 km (18 mi) course with about 2,500 m (8,200 ft) of climb. Said Alexandersson: "I did not have a big expectation of this race because I am new to skyraces but it was a nice day for me. It was a fantastic course and it feels amazing to be world champion."

In October 2018 Tove Alexandersson triumphed for the second year in a row in the Limone Extreme SkyRace, this time by a margin of nine minutes. This was Alexandersson's third skyrunning race ever, and she remained undefeated.

In July 2020 Alexandersson won the Salomon 27K Fjällmaraton race in Sweden with a new course record. A few days later she won the 43K Fjällmaraton race, again with a new course record. In October Alexandersson won the Skyrace des Matheysins in France. A week later Alexandersson missed victory in a skyrunning race for the first time ever. In the four-day stage race Golden Trail Championship in the Azores she had a huge lead after the first day, but performed increasingly less well over the next three days to finish fourth overall.

In October 2021 Alexandersson won the KM de Chando in Switzerland, where the runners ascend 2,000 vertical meters to the top of Illhorn.

In June 2023 Alexandersson took a silver medal in the 2023 World Mountain and Trail Running Championships World Championship in the Up and Downhill Mountain class. In September 2025 she took her first trail running gold medal in Short Trail 45K in the World Mountain and Trail Running Championships, 34 minutes ahead of the runner-up. Tove also won gold medal with team Sweden.

In March 2024 Alexandersson participated in the first World Championships of the running discipline SkySnow which consists of running on snow at high altitude wearing micro crampons. She had never competed in this sport but nevertheless won all three gold medals up for grabs: Vertical, Classic and Combined.

== Ski mountaineering ==
In November 2019 Alexandersson stated that she would limit her ski orienteering competitions during the upcoming winter, in order to practice ski mountaineering. She said that she intended to participate in five world cup competitions plus the upcoming European Championships. Her best result that year was a fifth-place finish, but the European championships was cancelled due to the Coronavirus pandemic.

In February 2021, into her second season of Ski mountaineering, Alexandersson won her first World Cup race, following four second-place finishes. In March 2021, Alexandersson participated in the World Championships in La Massana, Andorra, becoming the combined world champion, and placing second in the individual event, third in the vertical event, fourth in the sprint event and fifth in the team relay representing Sweden.

Alexandersson would have won the ISMF World Cup Ski Mountaineering overall title in 2021, had she not missed the prize-giving ceremony following the sprint race, held at the world cup final in Madonna di Campiglio. She had finished fifth in the race and, due to a misunderstanding, she was under the impression that only the top three athletes were to attend the ceremony. The mistake resulted in Alexandersson's disqualification and as a consequence the overall title was instead awarded to French competitor Axelle Mollaret, while Alexandersson had to settle for second place.

In 2024 Alexandersson won the individual race in the European Championships of Ski Mountaineering. The following year Alexandersson won the individual race in the World Championships of Ski Mountaineering, and a silver medal in the vertical race.

== World Championships gold medal summary ==
| Year | Age | OR | SkiOR | SkyR | SkiM | Trail | SkyS | Total |
|---|---|---|---|---|---|---|---|---|
| 2011 | 18 | — | 1 | — | — | — | — | 1 |
| 2012 | 19 | — | — | — | — | — | — | — |
| 2013 | 20 | — | 2 | — | — | — | — | 2 |
| 2014 | 21 | — | — | — | — | — | — | — |
| 2015 | 22 | — | 2 | — | — | — | — | 2 |
| 2016 | 23 | 2 | — | — | — | — | — | 2 |
| 2017 | 24 | 3 | 3 | — | — | — | — | 6 |
| 2018 | 25 | 2 | — | 1 | — | — | — | 3 |
| 2019 | 26 | 3 | 2 | — | — | — | — | 5 |
| 2020 | 27 | — | — | — | — | — | — | — |
| 2021 | 28 | 5 | — | — | 1 | — | — | 6 |
| 2022 | 29 | 2 | — | — | — | — | — | 2 |
| 2023 | 30 | 2 | — | — | — | — | — | 2 |
| 2024 | 31 | 2 | — | — | — | — | 3 | 5 |
| 2025 | 32 | 2 | — | — | 1 | 2 | — | 5 |
| Total | — | 23 | 10 | 1 | 2 | 2 | 3 | 41 |

== Awards ==
=== Svenska Dagbladet Gold Medal ===
Tove Alexandersson was awarded the Svenska Dagbladet Gold Medal in early December 2019.

=== Jerring Award ===
During Svenska idrottsgalan in January 2020, she received the Jerring Award. She was also awarded "Swedish Sportswoman of the Year 2019".

=== H. M. The King's Medal ===
Alexandersson received the H. M. The King's Medal for outstanding contributions to orienteering, ski orienteering and skyrunning in 2022.

== Notes ==
Awards and achievements
| Preceded by Hanna Öberg | Svenska Dagbladet Gold Medal; 2019 | Succeeded by Armand Duplantis |
