= Jakob Edsen =

Danish orienteering competitor

Personal information
- Born: 1993 (age 32–33) Aarhus, Denmark

Sport
- Sport: Orienteering
- Club: Aarhus 1900 Orientering (DEN); OK Pan Aarhus (DEN)
Medal record
Men's orienteering
Representing Denmark
World Championships
Bronze medal – third place	2018 Riga	Mixed sprint relay
Junior World Championships
Silver medal – second place	2012 Kosice	Relay

Jakob Edsen (born 1993) is a Danish orienteering competitor. He was born in Aarhus. He competed at the 2018 World Orienteering Championships in Latvia, where he placed 15th in the sprint final, and won a bronze medal in the mixed sprint relay with the Danish team. He won a silver medal in the relay at the 2012 Junior World Orienteering Championships in Kosice, and placed fourth in the sprint and seventh in the long distance in the same championship.
