= Anastasia Rudnaya =

Russian orienteering competitor

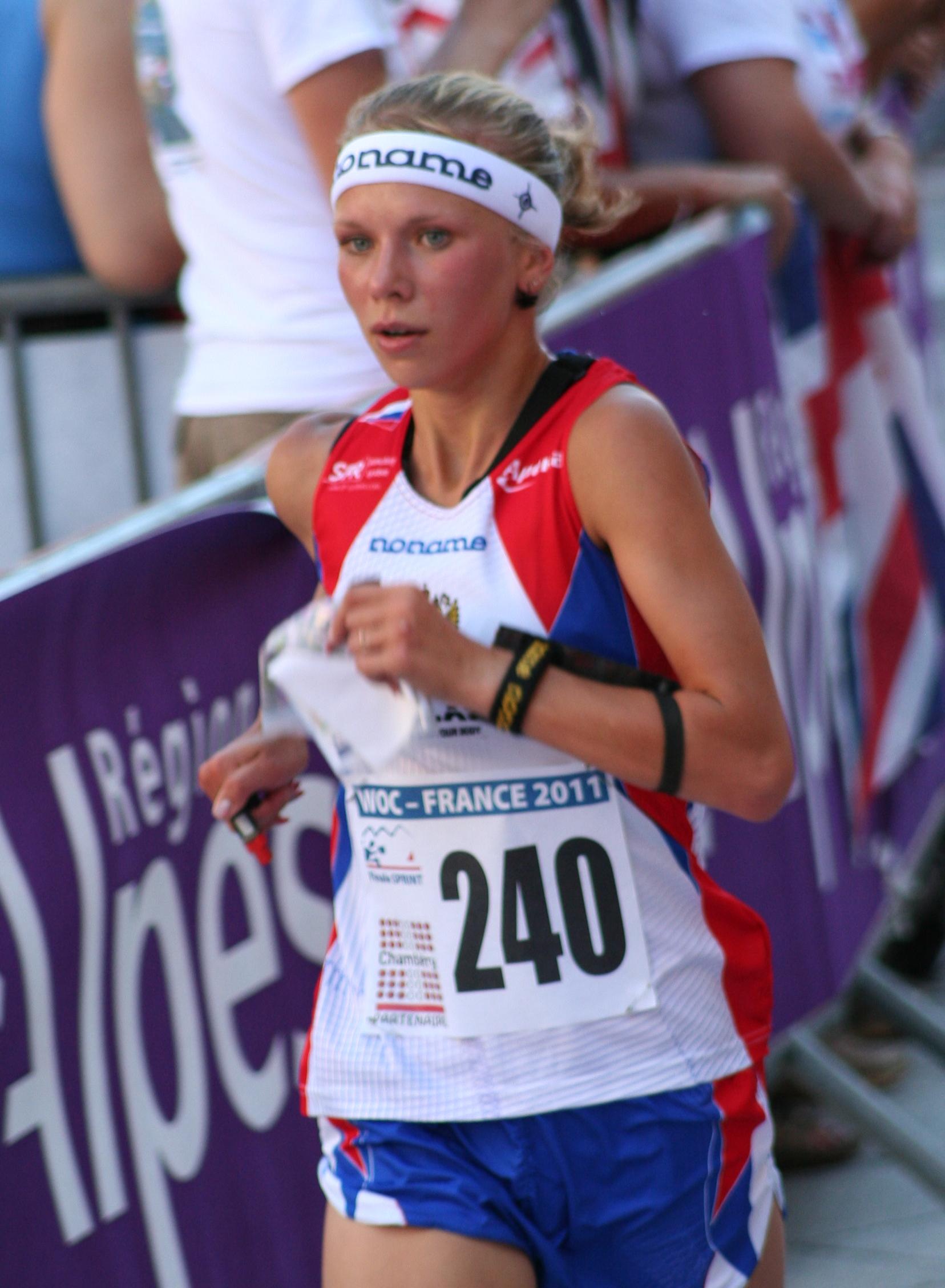
- Tikhonova at WOC 2011

Personal information
- Full name: Anastasia Aleksandrovna Rudnaya
- Born: 4 October 1990 (age 35)

Sport
- Sport: Orienteering
- Club: MS Parma; Velikiy Novgorod CSP
Medal record
Women's orienteering
Representing Russia
Junior World Championships
Bronze medal – third place	2010 Aalborg	Relay
World Championships
Gold medal – first place	2016 Strömstad	Relay
Silver medal – second place	2017 Tartu	Relay
Bronze medal – third place	2014 Asiago-Lavarone	Mixed sprint relay
Bronze medal – third place	2019 Østfold	Relay
Military World Games
Gold medal – first place	2019 Wuhan	Middle
Gold medal – first place	2019 Wuhan	Long
Gold medal – first place	2019 Wuhan	Relay
Gold medal – first place	2019 Wuhan	Team

Anastasia Aleksandrovna Rudnaya (Russian: Анастасия Александровна Рудная; born 4 October 1990; née Tikhonova) is a Russian orienteering competitor. She was born in Leningrad.

As a junior, she won a bronze medal in the relay at the 2010 Junior World Championships in Aalborg.

She won a bronze medal in the mixed relay in the 2014 World Orienteering Championships in Asiago-Lavarone with the Russian team.

At the 2016 World Orienteering Championships in Strömstad she placed 13th in the long distance, and won a gold medal with the Russian relay team.
