= William Lind (orienteer) =

Swedish orienteering competitor (born 1985)

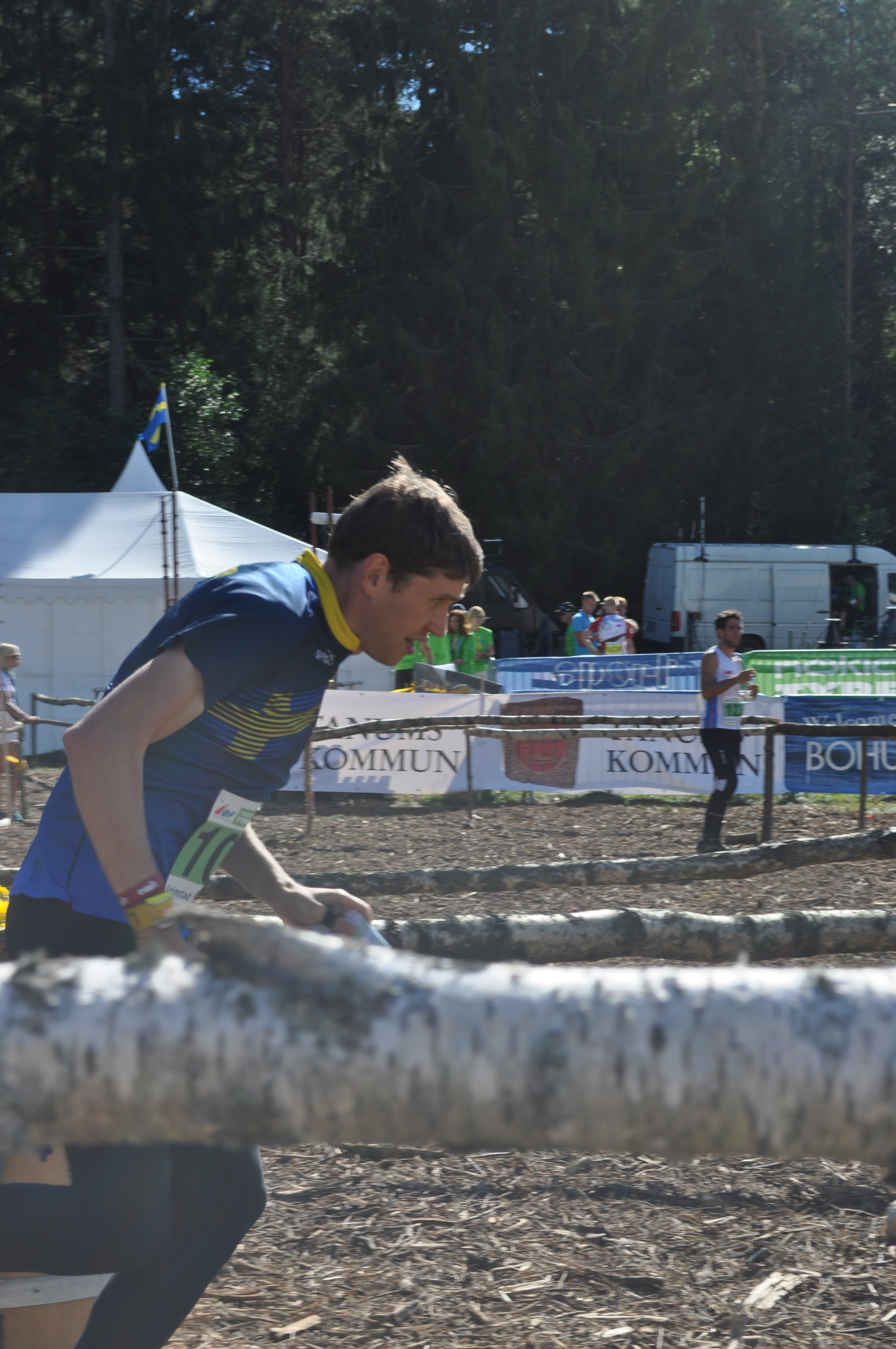
- Lind at WOC 2016

Personal information
- Born: 12 February 1985 (age 41)

Sport
- Sport: Orienteering
Medal record
Men's orienteering
Representing Sweden
World Championships
Bronze medal – third place	2016 Strömstad	Relay
Bronze medal – third place	2017 Tartu	Long
Bronze medal – third place	2017 Tartu	Relay

William Lind (born 12 February 1985) is a Swedish orienteering competitor. At the 2016 World Orienteering Championships in Strömstad he won a bronze medal in relay with the Swedish team, along with Gustav Bergman and Fredrik Bakkman. He won his first individual medal in the 2017 long championships in Estonia, receiving a bronze medal behind Norwegian Olav Lundanes and Russian runner Leonid Novikov.
