= Kamilla Steiwer =

Norwegian orienteering competitor

Personal information
- Nationality: Norwegian
- Born: 1993 (age 32–33)

Sport
- Sport: Orienteering
- Club: Fredrikstad SK
Medal record
Representing Norway
Women's orienteering
World Championships
Bronze medal – third place	2021 Doksy	Relay
European Championships
Silver medal – second place	2024 Mór	Relay

Kamilla Steiwer (née Olaussen; born 1993) is a Norwegian orienteering competitor who represents the club Fredrikstad SK.

== Career ==
Competing at the 2018 World Orienteering Championships in Latvia, Steiwer placed fourth in the relay with the Norwegian team, and 5th in the long distance. At the 2019 World Orienteering Championships in Østfold, Norway, she placed fourth in the relay, 16th in the middle distance, and 13th in the long distance.

She competed at the 2021 World Orienteering Championships in the Czech Republic, where she placed fourth in the middle distance after a close fight for the bronze medal, two seconds behind Simona Aebersold. She won a bronze medal in the relay with the Norwegian team, together with Marie Olaussen and Andrine Benjaminsen.

Steiwer was running the first leg in the relay at the 2024 European Orienteering Championships, winning silver medal for Norway along with Marie Olaussen and Andrine Benjaminsen.

== Personal life ==
She is a sister of Marie Olaussen and in a relationship with Gaute Hallan Steiwer, and sister-in-law of Kine Hallan Steiwer.
