= Miika Kirmula =

Finnish orienteering competitor

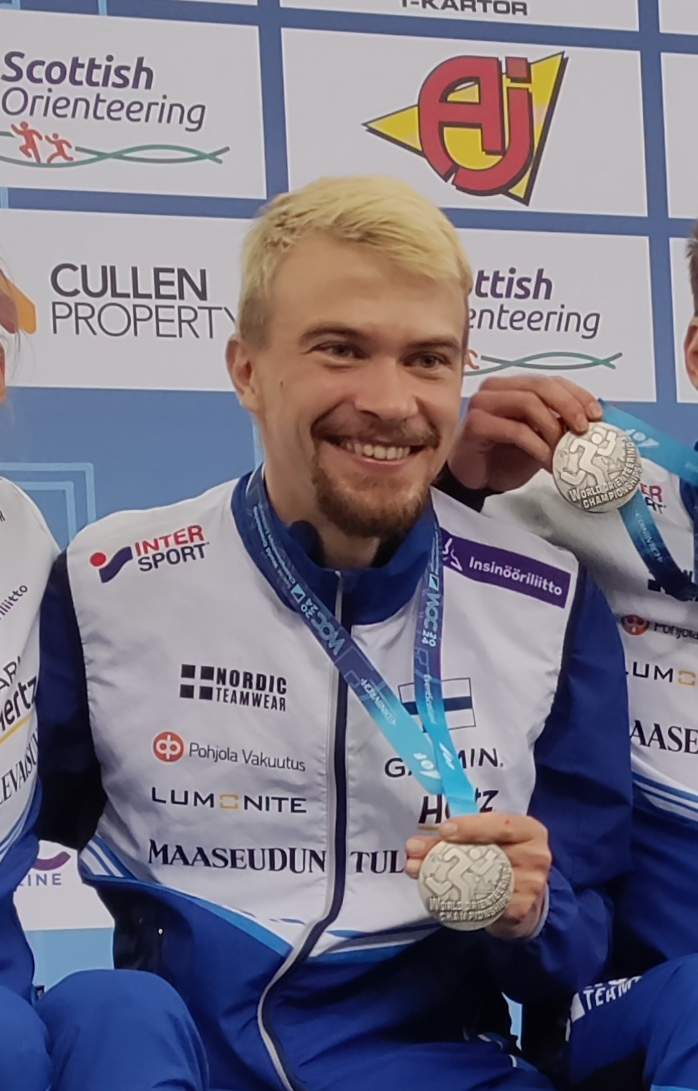
- Kirmula at the 2024 World Orienteering Championships.

Personal information
- Nationality: Finnish
- Born: 12 December 1994 (age 31) Vantaa, Finland

Sport
- Sport: Orienteering
- Club: Kalevan Rasti
Medal record
Representing Finland
Men's orienteering
World Championships
Silver medal – second place	2019 Østfold	Relay
Silver medal – second place	2024 Edinburgh	Sprint relay
Bronze medal – third place	2025 Kuopio	Relay
Junior World Championships
Gold medal – first place	2014 Bulgaria	Middle

Miika Kirmula (born 12 December 1994) is a Finnish orienteering competitor, born in Vantaa. He competed at the 2019 World Orienteering Championships in Østfold, where placed 16th in the long distance, 7th in the middle final, and won a silver medal with the Finnish relay team. He won a gold medal in the middle distance at the 2014 Junior World Orienteering Championships.

At the 2025 World Orienteering Championships, he placed 5th in the middle distance, 6th in the long distance, and won a bronze medal in the relay with the Finnish team.
