= Julia Jakob =

Swiss orienteer (born 1991)

Personal information
- Born: 15 April 1991 (age 35)

Sport
- Sport: Orienteering
- Club: OL Zimmerberg; Stora Tuna OK
Medal record
Representing Switzerland
Women's orienteering
World Championships
Gold medal – first place	2018 Latvia	Relay
Silver medal – second place	2019 Østfold	Relay
European Championships
Gold medal – first place	2014 Palmela	Relay
Gold medal – first place	2018 Tessin	Relay
Bronze medal – third place	2014 Palmela	Sprint
Bronze medal – third place	2018 Ticino	Long
Junior World Championships
Gold medal – first place	2009 Primiero	Relay

Julia Jakob, formerly Julia Gross (born 15 April 1991) is a Swiss orienteer. She was born in Richterswil and resides in Zürich.

She won a bronze medal in the sprint at the 2014 European Orienteering Championships in Palmela. At the 2017 World Orienteering Championships in Tartu, Estonia, she placed 15th in the long distance, 15th in the sprint final, and fourth in the relay with the Swiss team.

She won a gold medal in the relay at the 2018 World Orienteering Championships in Latvia, together with Elena Roos and Judith Wyder. She also won the Venla Relay in 2018 together with Tove Alexandersson, Anna Mårsell and Magdalena Olsson.
