= Lucas Basset =

French orienteering competitor (born 1991)

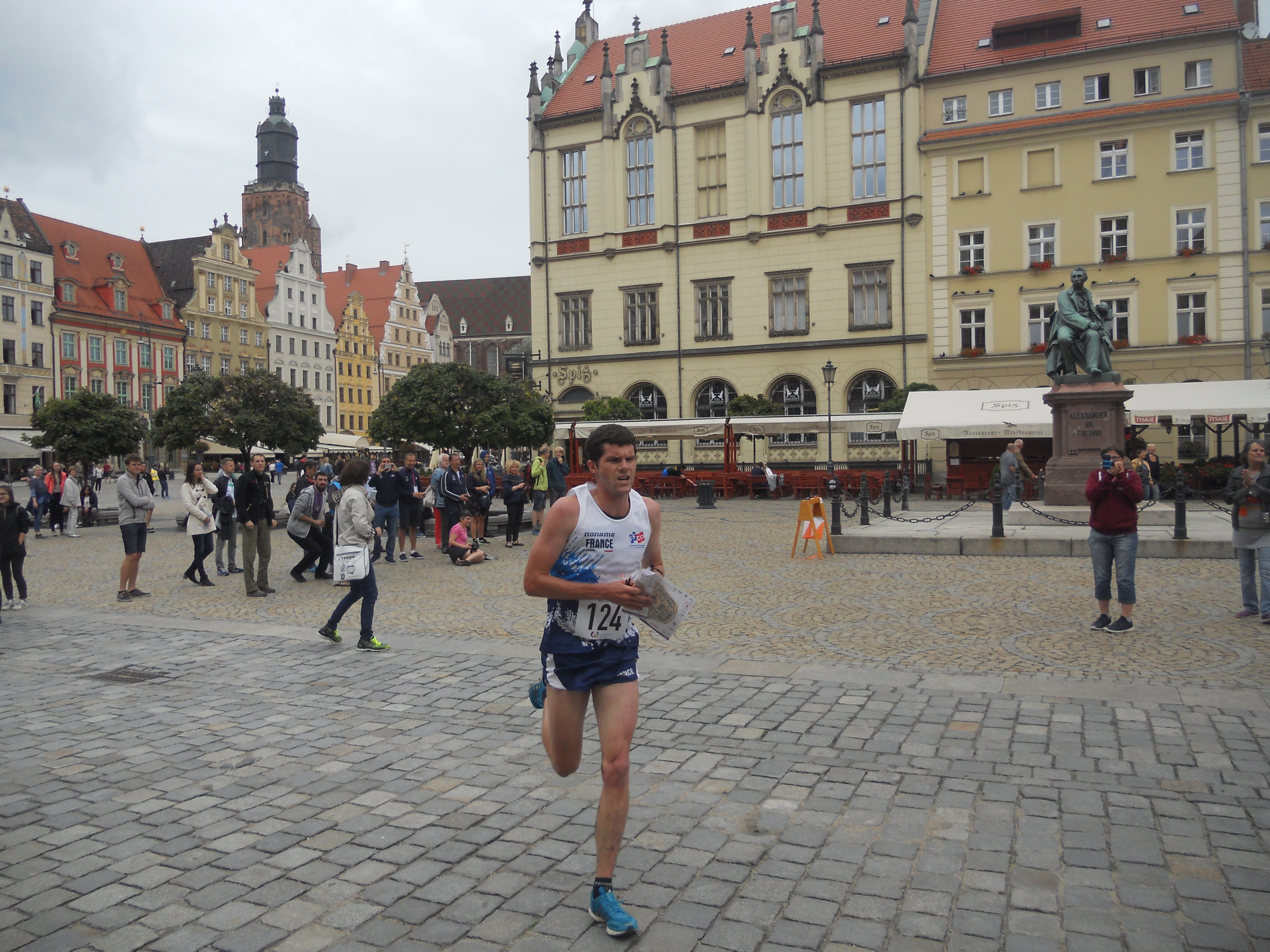
- Lucas Basset during World Games 2017

Sport
- Sport: Orienteering
Medal record
Men's orienteering
Representing France
World Championships
Silver medal – second place	2015 Inverness	Middle
Silver medal – second place	2017 Tartu	Relay
Bronze medal – third place	2015 Inverness	Relay
Bronze medal – third place	2019 Østfold	Relay
European Championships
Bronze medal – third place	2012 Palmela	Relay
Junior World Championships
Gold medal – first place	2011 Rumia–Wejherowo	Sprint
Bronze medal – third place	2011 Rumia–Wejherowo	Long
European Youth Championships
Silver medal – second place	2008 Solothurn	Long

Lucas Basset (born 28 March 1991) is a French orienteering competitor.
