= Sara Hagström =

Swedish orienteering competitor

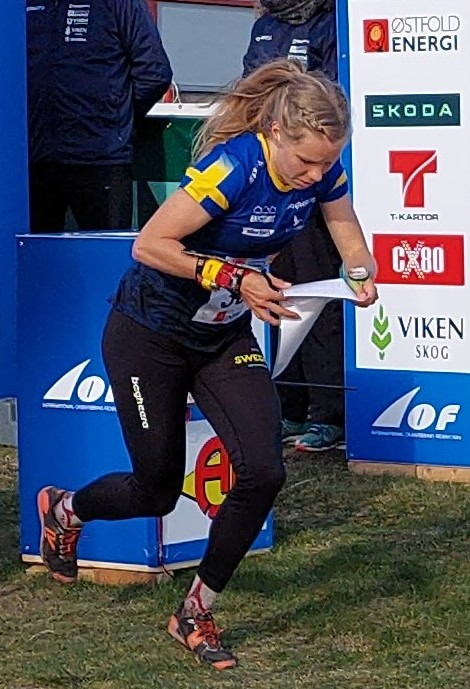
- Hagström in 2023

Personal information
- Born: 25 March 1995 (age 31) Skövde, Sweden

Sport
- Sport: Orienteering
- Club: IFK Göteborg
Medal record
Women's orienteering
Representing Sweden
World Championships
Gold medal – first place	2021 Doksy	Relay
Gold medal – first place	2021 Doksy	Sprint Relay
Gold medal – first place	2023 Flims-Laax	Relay
European Championships
Gold medal – first place	2023 Italy	Sprint
Gold medal – first place	2022 Estonia	Relay
Bronze medal – third place	2018 Switzerland	Relay
Junior World Championships
Gold medal – first place	2014 Bulgaria	Sprint
Gold medal – first place	2014 Bulgaria	Relay
Gold medal – first place	2015 Rauland	Long
Gold medal – first place	2015 Rauland	Relay
Silver medal – second place	2013 Czech Republic	Long
Silver medal – second place	2014 Bulgaria	Middle
Silver medal – second place	2014 Bulgaria	Long

Sara Hagström (born 25 March 1995) is a Swedish orienteering competitor. Her achievements include winning three world championship gold medals with the Swedish relay teams.

== Biography ==
Hagström was born in Skövde.

She won individual gold medals at the Junior World Orienteering Championships in 2014 and 2015, and was part of the Swedish team that won the relay in 2014 and 2015. She competed at the 2016 World Orienteering Championships, and won a bronze medal in the relay at the 2018 European Orienteering Championships. She placed sixth in the middle distance at the 2018 World Orienteering Championships in Latvia.

She represented Sweden at the 2021 World Orienteering Championships in the Czech Republic, where she placed fifth in the middle distance. She won a gold medal in the women's relay with the Swedish team, along with Lisa Risby and Tove Alexandersson.

At the 2023 World Orienteering Championships she won a gold medal as a team member for Sweden, where she was running the second leg.

During the 2023 European Orienteering Championships Hagström won the gold medal. Her first individual medal in a championship.

Her sister Johanna Hagström is a cross-country skier.
