= Lina Strand =

Swedish orienteering competitor

Personal information
- Nationality: Swedish
- Born: 23 December 1988 (age 37) Gothenburg

Sport
- Sport: Orienteering
Medal record
Women's orienteering
Representing Sweden
World Games
Bronze medal – third place	2017 Wrocław	Sprint
World Championships
Gold medal – first place	2017 Tartu	Sprint relay
Gold medal – first place	2019 Østfold	Relay
Silver medal – second place	2019 Østfold	Long
Bronze medal – third place	2016 Strömstad	Mixed sprint relay
European Championships
Bronze medal – third place	2012 Falun	Relay
Gold medal – first place	2022 Rakvere	Relay

Lina Strand (born 23 December 1988) is a Swedish orienteering competitor, born in Gothenburg. She won a bronze medal in the relay at the 2012 European Orienteering Championships in Falun.

She competed at the 2012 World Orienteering Championships. In the middle distance she qualified for the final, where she placed 11th. To date, her greatest achievements at the World Orienteering Championships have been coming second in the Long Distance in 2019, first in the Sprint Relay in 2017 and third in the Mixed Sprint Relay in 2016.

Strand ranked third at the 2017 World Games in Wrocław, Poland.
