= Sabine Hauswirth =

Swiss orienteering competitor

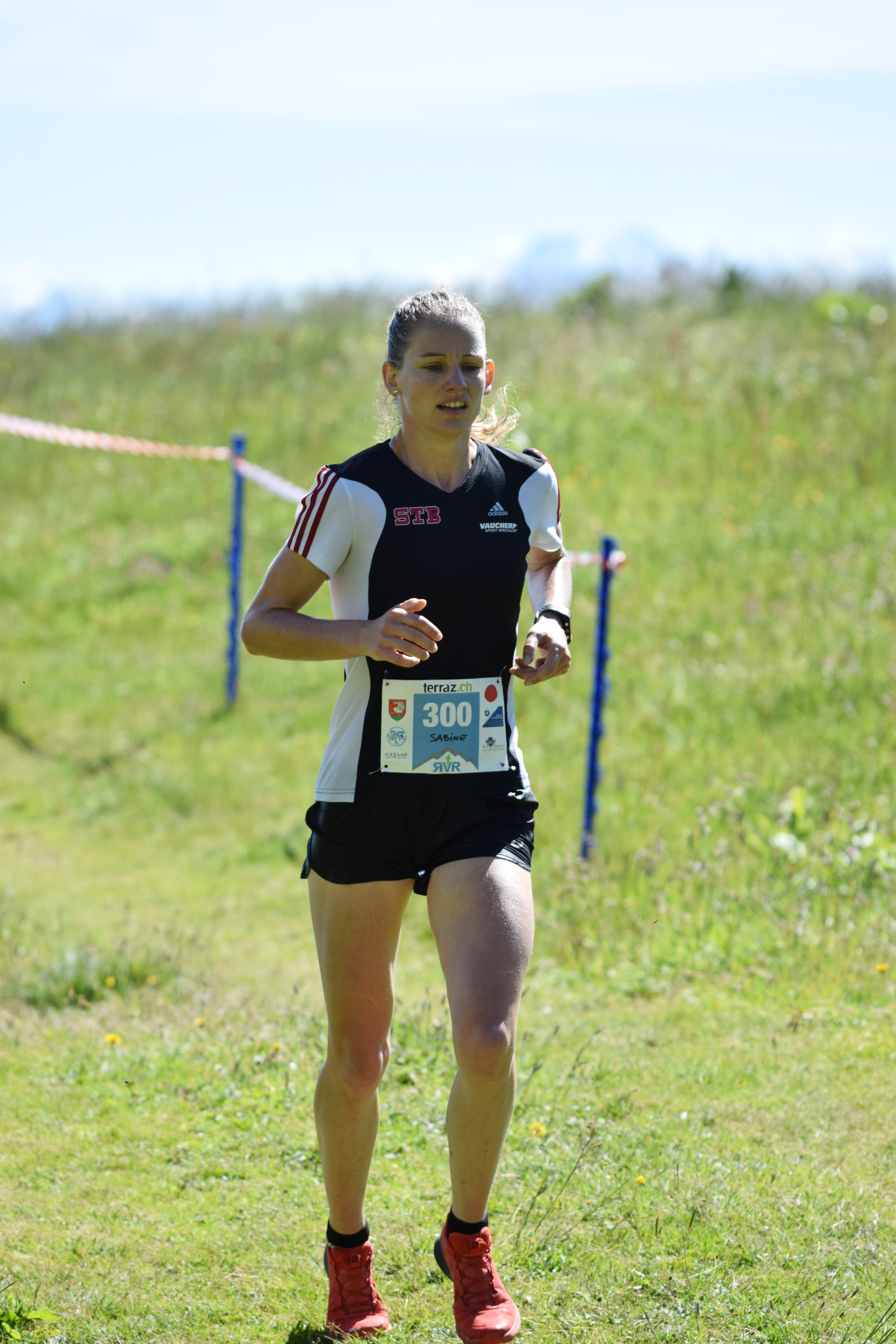

Medal record

Women's orienteering

Representing Switzerland

World Games
Silver medal – second place	2017 Wrocław	Mixed sprint relay
Bronze medal – third place	2017 Wrocław	Middle

World Championships
Gold medal – first place	2014 Asiago-Lavarone	Relay
Silver medal – second place	2019 Østfold	Relay
Bronze medal – third place	2017 Tartu	Mixed sprint relay
Bronze medal – third place	2018 Riga	Long

European Championships
Gold medal – first place	2014 Palmela	Relay

Junior World Championships
Bronze medal – third place	2007 Dubbo	Relay

Sabine Hauswirth (born 8 December 1987) is a Swiss orienteering competitor.

She won a gold medal in the relay in the 2014 World Orienteering Championships in Asiago-Lavarone with the Swiss team, and placed 14th in the middle distance.

She ranked third at the 2017 World Games in Wrocław, Poland in the middle-distance and second in the mixed sprint relay.

As a junior, she won a bronze medal in the relay at the 2007 Junior World Championships in Dubbo, where she also placed fourth in the long course.
