= Karolin Ohlsson =

Swedish orienteering competitor (1991)

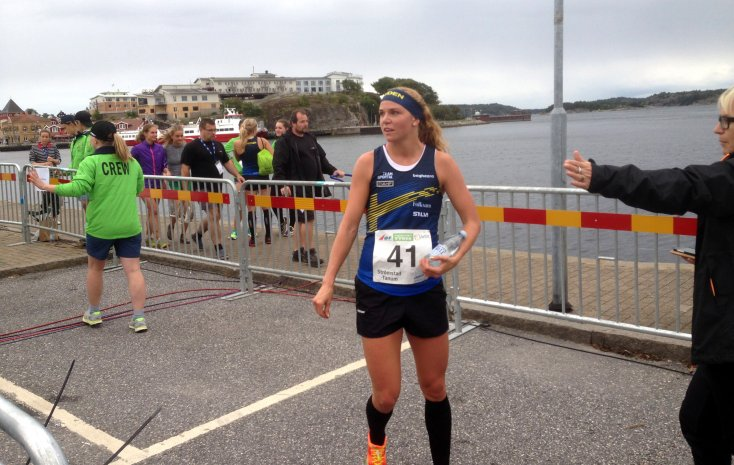
- WOC Sprint Final - Karolin Ohlsson

Personal information
- Born: 1991 (age 34–35) Stockholm, Sweden

Sport
- Sport: Orienteering
- Club: Järla Orientering
Medal record
Women's orienteering
Representing Sweden
World Games
Silver medal – second place	2022 Birmingham	Middle
World Championships
Gold medal – first place	2018 Latvia	Mixed sprint relay
Gold medal – first place	2019 Østfold	Relay
Silver medal – second place	2018 Latvia	Relay
Silver medal – second place	2024 Edinburgh	Knock out sprint
Silver medal – second place	2026 Genova	Knock out sprint
Silver medal – second place	2026 Genova	Mixed sprint relay
European Championships
Silver medal – second place	2014 Palmela	Relay
Silver medal – second place	2018 Switzerland	Mixed sprint relay
Silver medal – second place	2018 Switzerland	Relay

Karolin Ohlsson (born 29 August 1991) is a Swedish orienteering competitor who competes internationally. She became world champion in the sprint relay in 2018.

== Personal life ==
Ohlsson was born in Stockholm, and works as a silversmith in Stockholm.

== Career ==
Ohlsson won a silver medal in the relay at the 2014 European Orienteering Championships in Portugal with the Swedish team, and placed 12th in the sprint, and 17th in the long distance. At the 2015 World Orienteering Championships in Inverness, she placed fifth in the mixed sprint relay, and tenth in the sprint final. In the 2016 European Championships she placed 20th in the sprint and 35th in the long distance, and she placed 13th in the sprint at the 2016 World Orienteering Championships in Strömstad, Sweden. She competed at the 2017 World Orienteering Championships in Tartu, Estonia, where she placed 11th in the sprint, and 27th in the long distance.

At the 2018 European Orienteering Championships in Switzerland she won a silver medal in the mixed sprint relay, and a silver medal in women's relay. She placed eighth in the sprint and ninth in the long distance. She competed at the 2018 World Orienteering Championships in Latvia, where she placed fifth the sprint final, and won a gold medal in the mixed sprint relay, together with Emil Svensk, Jonas Leandersson and Tove Alexandersson. She was running the second leg in the women's relay at the 2018 World Championships, where Sweden won the silver medal, with Helena Bergman on the first leg and Tove Alexandersson on the final leg. She placed 21st in the middle course, and seventh in the long distance in the 2018 World Championships.

Ohlsson won silver medals at both the 2024 and the 2026 World Orienteering Championships. In Genova 2024 she came third in one of the semifinals, but after a jury decision concerning obstructions, she was placed second. By that jury decision she was admitted to the final, and could successfully win her second silver medal in knockout sprint.

In 2018 she was on the Järla IF club team which won the Tiomila relay.

She participated in World Games 2022 in Birmingham, Alabama where she won a silver medal in the Middle Distance and placed 4th in the Individual Sprint.
