= Marika Teini =

Finnish orienteering competitor

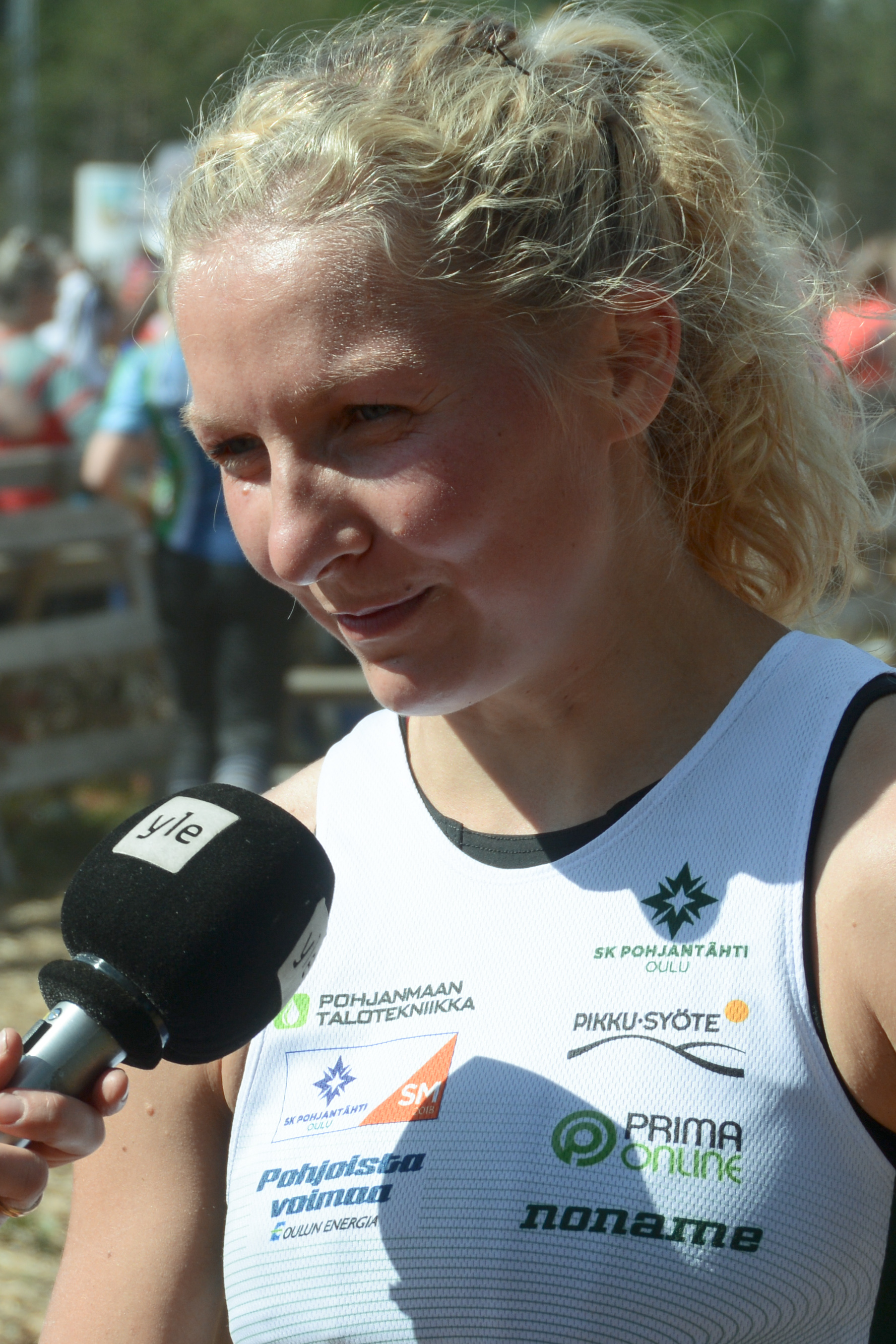

Personal information
- Born: 31 January 1989 (age 37)

Sport
- Sport: Orienteering
- Club: Kalevan Rasti
Medal record
Women's orienteering
Representing Finland
World Championships
Bronze medal – third place	2016 Strömstad	Relay
Bronze medal – third place	2017 Tartu	Relay
European Championships
Gold medal – first place	2018 Ticino	Middle

Marika Teini (born 31 January 1989) is a Finnish orienteering competitor. At the 2016 World Orienteering Championships in Strömstad she placed 6th in the middle distance, and won a bronze medal with the Finnish relay team. She repeated her relay bronze medal in 2017, before winning the gold medal at the 2018 European Orienteering Championships in Switzerland, ahead of Swedish runner Tove Alexandersson.
