= Vojtěch Král =

Czech orienteering competitor

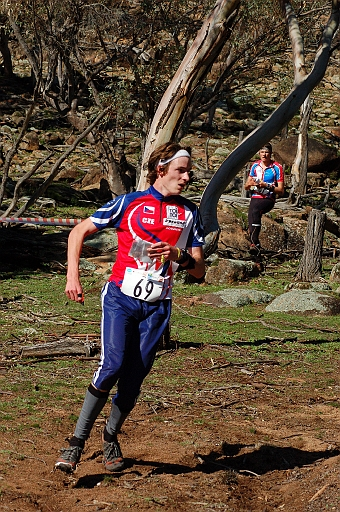

Personal information
- Born: 4 July 1988 (age 37) Šumperk, Czechoslovakia
Medal record
Men's orienteering
Representing Czech Republic
European Championships
Silver medal – second place	2014 Palmela	Relay
Bronze medal – third place	2016 Jeseník	Relay
World Games
Bronze medal – third place	2017 Wrocław	Middle distance
Junior World Championships
Gold medal – first place	2007 Dubbo	Sprint

Vojtěch Král (born 4 July 1988) is a Czech orienteer. He became Junior World Champion in sprint in Dubbo in 2007.

He competed at the 2012 World Orienteering Championships. In the sprint competition he qualified for the final, where he placed 10th.

== See also ==
- List of orienteers
- List of orienteering events
