= 2021 Orienteering World Cup =

International orienteering competition

World Cup events
- Individual: 6
- Relay: 4

Men's World Cup
- 1st: Kasper Harlem Fosser (NOR)
- 2nd: Matthias Kyburz (SUI)
- 3rd: Daniel Hubmann (SUI)
- Most wins: Kasper Harlem Fosser (NOR) (3)

Women's World Cup
- 1st: Tove Alexandersson (SWE)
- 2nd: Simona Aebersold (SUI)
- 3rd: Hanna Lundberg (SWE)
- Most wins: Tove Alexandersson (SWE) (4)

Team World Cup
- 1st: Sweden
- 2nd: Switzerland
- 3rd: Norway
- Most wins: Sweden (2)

The 2021 Orienteering World Cup was the 26th edition of the Orienteering World Cup. The 2021 Orienteering World Cup consisted of six individual events and four relay events. The events were located in Switzerland, Sweden, and Italy. The 2021 World Orienteering Championships in the Czech Republic were not included in the World Cup.

== Events ==
=== Men ===
No.	Venue	Distance	Date	Winner	Second	Third	Ref.
Round 1 - Switzerland
1	Neuchâtel, Switzerland	Knock-out sprint	15 May	(Switzerland) Matthias Kyburz	(Switzerland) Joey Hadorn	(Norway) Kasper Harlem Fosser	
2	Neuchâtel, Switzerland	Sprint	16 May	(Sweden) Emil Svensk	(Belgium) Yannick Michiels	(Sweden) Gustav Bergman	
Round 2 - Sweden
3	Idre, Sweden	Long	12 August	(Norway) Kasper Harlem Fosser	(Norway) Magne Dæhli	(Switzerland) Daniel Hubmann	
4	Idre, Sweden	Middle	14 August	(Switzerland) Joey Hadorn	(Switzerland) Daniel Hubmann	(Sweden) Simon Hector	
Round 3 - Finals
5	Cansiglio, Italy	Long	30 September	(Norway) Kasper Harlem Fosser	(Switzerland) Matthias Kyburz	(Switzerland) Daniel Hubmann	
6	Cansiglio, Italy	Middle	2 October	(Norway) Kasper Harlem Fosser	(Switzerland) Matthias Kyburz	(Italy) Riccardo Scalet	

=== Women ===
No.	Venue	Distance	Date	Winner	Second	Third	Ref.
Round 1 - Switzerland
1	Neuchâtel, Switzerland	Knock-out sprint	15 May	(Sweden) Tove Alexandersson	(Switzerland) Simona Aebersold	(Norway) Andrine Benjaminsen	
2	Neuchâtel, Switzerland	Sprint	16 May	(Sweden) Tove Alexandersson	(Switzerland) Elena Roos	(Switzerland) Simona Aebersold	
Round 2 - Sweden
3	Idre, Sweden	Long	12 August	(Switzerland) Simona Aebersold	(Norway) Andrine Benjaminsen	(Sweden) Tove Alexandersson	
4	Idre, Sweden	Middle	14 August	(Sweden) Hanna Lundberg	(Switzerland) Simona Aebersold	(Russia) Natalia Gemperle	
Round 3 - Finals
5	Cansiglio, Italy	Long	30 September	(Sweden) Tove Alexandersson	(Switzerland) Simona Aebersold	(Russia) Natalia Gemperle	
6	Cansiglio, Italy	Middle	2 October	(Sweden) Tove Alexandersson	(Switzerland) Simona Aebersold	(Norway) Andrine Benjaminsen	

=== Relay ===
No.	Venue	Distance	Date	Winner	Second	Third	Ref.
1	Neuchâtel, Switzerland	Sprint relay	13 May	Switzerland Simona Aebersold; Joey Hadorn; Matthias Kyburz; Elena Roos	Sweden Lina Strand; Gustav Bergman; Emil Svensk; Sara Hagström	Norway Victoria Hæstad Bjørnstad; Eskil Kinneberg; Kasper Harlem Fosser; Andrine Benjaminsen	
2	Idre, Sweden	Men's relay	15 August	Sweden1 Albin Ridefelt; Simon Hector; Gustav Bergman	Norway1 Eskil Kinneberg; Magne Dæhli; Kasper Harlem Fosser	Switzerland1 Daniel Hubmann; Florian Howald; Matthias Kyburz	
3	Idre, Sweden	Women's relay	15 August	Sweden2 Emma Bjessmo; Johanna Öberg; Sara Hagström	Sweden1 Lisa Risby; Hanna Lundberg; Karolin Ohlsson	Russia1 Anastasia Rudnaya; Svetlana Mironova; Natalia Gemperle	
4	Cansiglio, Italy	Sprint Relay	3 October	Norway Victoria Hæstad Bjørnstad; Audun Heimdal; Kasper Harlem Fosser; Andrine Benjaminsen	Sweden Tove Alexandersson; Isac von Krusenstierna; Emil Svensk; Sara Hagström	Switzerland Paula Gross; Joey Hadorn; Matthias Kyburz; Simona Aebersold	

== Points distribution ==
The 40 best runners in each event are awarded points. The winner is awarded 100 points. In WC events 1 to 7, the six best results counts in the overall classification. In the finals (WC 8 and WC 9), both results count.

Rank	1	2	3	4	5	6	7	8	9	10	11	12	13	14	15	16	17	18	19	20	21	22	23	24	25	26	27	28	29	30	31	32	33	34	35	36	37	38	39	40
Points	100	80	60	50	45	40	37	35	33	31	30	29	28	27	26	25	24	23	22	21	20	19	18	17	16	15	14	13	12	11	10	9	8	7	6	5	4	3	2	1

== Overall standings ==
This section shows the overall standings after all events.

=== Men ===
Rank	Athlete	Points
1	(Norway) Kasper Harlem Fosser	460
2	(Switzerland) Matthias Kyburz	363
3	(Switzerland) Daniel Hubmann	304
4	(Switzerland) Joey Hadorn	242
5	(Sweden) Emil Svensk	195
6	(Norway) Audun Heimdal	180
7	(Switzerland) Florian Howald	168
8	(Sweden) Isac von Krusenstierna	145
9	(Norway) Lukas Liland	142
10	(Sweden) Gustav Bergman	133

=== Women ===
Rank	Athlete	Points
1	(Sweden) Tove Alexandersson	505
2	(Switzerland) Simona Aebersold	480
3	(Sweden) Hanna Lundberg	305
4	(Norway) Andrine Benjaminsen	290
5	(Russia) Natalia Gemperle	247
6	(Sweden) Sara Hagström	222
7	(Sweden) Karolin Ohlsson	203
8	(Switzerland) Elena Roos	167
9	(Switzerland) Sarina Kyburz	148
10	(Finland) Lotta Karhola	146

=== Team ===
The table shows the standings after all events. This was the first year where individual results counted towards the team world cup, meaning competitors contributed to the team's score in both relay and individual events.

Rank	Nation	Points
1	Sweden	7404
2	Switzerland	6432
3	Norway	6115
4	Finland	3774
5	Czech Republic	3451
6	Russia	2904
7	Denmark	2501
8	Austria	2235
9	France	2052
10	Poland	2020
