= 2024 Orienteering World Cup =

Orienteering competition edition

World Cup events
- Individual: 7
- Relay: 3

Men's World Cup
- 1st: Kasper Harlem Fosser (NOR)
- 2nd: Martin Regborn (SWE)
- 3rd: Eirik Langedal Breivik (NOR)
- Most wins: Kasper Fosser (NOR)(2); Eirik Langedal Breivik (NOR)(2)

Women's World Cup
- 1st: Simona Aebersold (SUI)
- 2nd: Tove Alexandersson (SWE)
- 3rd: Natalia Gemperle (SUI)
- Most wins: Tove Alexandersson (SWE) (4)

Team World Cup
- 1st: Sweden
- 2nd: Norway
- 3rd: Switzerland
- Most wins: Sweden(2); Switzerland(2)

The 2024 Orienteering World Cup is the 29th edition of the Orienteering World Cup. It consists of seven individual events and three relay events. These are split over four rounds taking place in Switzerland, Italy, Hungary and Finland. The World Cup was broadcast on public television in Sweden (SVT) Finland (YLE) and Switzerland (SRF)

This edition of the World Cup started with Sprint races in Switzerland and Italy. In Switzerland, Joey Hadorn and Tove Alexandersson won the first race of the first round, held in Knock-out sprint format. The second race was a sprint won by Natalia Gemperle and Emil Svensk. The second round was the first time the World Cup had been in Genoa, and was held in Voltri and Nervi. Kasper Harlem Fosser and Simona Aebersold won the sprint race, and the next day the Sprint relay was won by Switzerland.

The third round of the World Cup was held in Hungary, and was characterized by hot conditions. The world cup round was combined with the European Orienteering Championships. The first race was won by Eirik Langedal Breivik and Simona Aebersold In the long distance the next day, Kasper Fosser and Tove Alexandersson were the victors. The relay event was won by Switzerland and Norway.

== Events ==
=== Men ===
No.	Venue	Distance	Date	Winner	Second	Third	Ref.
Round 1 – Switzerland
1	Olten, Switzerland	Knock-out sprint	25 May	Joey Hadorn (SUI)	Jonatan Gustafsson (SWE)	Tuomas Heikkila (FIN)	
2	Olten, Switzerland	Sprint	26 May	Emil Svensk (SWE)	Tuomas Heikkila (FIN)	Martin Regborn (SWE)	
Round 2 – Italy
3	Genoa, Italy	Sprint	1 June	Kasper Fosser (NOR)	Martin Regborn (SWE)	Tomas Krivda (CZE)	
Round 3 – Hungary
4	Mór, Hungary	Middle	17 August	Eirik Langedal Breivik (NOR)	Kasper Fosser (NOR)	Albin Ridefelt (SWE)	
5	Mór, Hungary	Long	18 August	Kasper Fosser (NOR)	Daniel Hubmann (SUI)	Miika Kirmula (FIN)	
Round 4 – Finland
6	Kuopio, Finland	Long	26 September	Miika Kirmula (FIN)	Martin Regborn (SWE)	Eetu Savolainen (FIN)	
7	Kuopio, Finland	Middle	28 September	Eirik Langedal Breivik (NOR)	Kasper Fosser (NOR)	Max Peter Bejmer (SWE)	

=== Women ===
No.	Venue	Distance	Date	Winner	Second	Third	Ref.
Round 1 – Switzerland
1	Olten, Switzerland	Knock-out sprint	25 May	Tove Alexandersson (SWE)	Simona Aebersold (SUI)	Natalia Gemperle (SUI)	
2	Olten, Switzerland	Sprint	26 May	Natalia Gemperle (SUI)	Simona Aebersold (SUI)	Tereza Janosikova (CZE)	
Round 2 – Italy
3	Genoa, Italy	Sprint	1 June	Simona Aebersold (SUI)	Natalia Gemperle (SUI)	Ane Dyrkorn (NOR)	
Round 3 – Hungary
4	Mór, Hungary	Middle	17 August	Simona Aebersold (SUI)	Natalia Gemperle (SUI)	Andrine Benjaminsen (NOR)	
5	Mór, Hungary	Long	18 August	Tove Alexandersson (SWE)	Simona Aebersold (SUI)	Andrine Benjaminsen (NOR)	
Round 4 – Finland
6	Kuopio, Finland	Long	26 September	Tove Alexandersson (SWE)	Simona Aebersold (SUI)	Hanna Lundberg (SWE)	
7	Kuopio, Finland	Middle	28 September	Tove Alexandersson (SWE)	Simona Aebersold (SUI)	Marie Olaussen (NOR)	

=== Relay ===
No.	Venue	Distance	Date	Winner	Second	Third	Ref.
1	Genoa, Italy	Sprint relay	2 June	Switzerland Natalia Gemperle; Riccardo Rancan; Joey Hadorn; Simona Aebersold	Finland Maja Sianoja; Miika Kirmula; Tuomas Heikkila; Venla Harju	Czech Republic Barbora Matejkova; Jakub Glonek; Tomas Krivda; Tereza Janosikova	
2	Mór, Hungary	Men's relay	20 August	Norway 1 Eskil Kinneberg; Eirik Langedal Breivik; Kasper Harlem Fosser	Sweden 1 Viktor Svensk; Albin Ridefelt; Emil Svensk	Switzerland 1 Daniel Hubmann; Fabian Aebersold; Joey Hadorn	
3	Mór, Hungary	Women's relay	20 August	Switzerland 1 Ines Berger; Natalia Gemperle; Simona Aebersold	Norway 1 Kamilla Steiwer; Marie Olaussen; Andrine Benjaminsen	Sweden 1 Johanna Ridefelt; Hanna Lundberg; Tove Alexandersson	
4	Kuopio, Finland	Men's relay	29 September	Sweden 2 Albin Ridefelt; Emil Svensk; Gustav Bergman	Norway 1 Jørgen Baklid; Eirik Langedal Breivik; Kasper Harlem Fosser	Finland 1 Teemu Oksanen; Eetu Savolainen; Miika Kirmula	
5	Kuopio, Finland	Women's relay	29 September	Sweden 1 Hanna Lundberg; Sanna Fast; Tove Alexandersson	Norway 1 Ane Dyrkorn; Marie Olaussen; Andrine Benjaminsen	Finland 1 Marika Teini; Maija Sianoja; Venla Harju	

== Overall standings ==
This section shows the standings after the events in Finland.

=== Men ===
Rank	Athlete	Points
1	Kasper Harlem Fosser (NOR)	444
2	Martin Regborn (SWE)	346
3	Eirik Langedal Breivik (NOR)	294
4	Emil Svensk (SWE)	258
5	Daniel Hubmann (SUI)	239
6	Miika Kirmula (FIN)	232
7	Joey Hadorn (SUI)	225
8	Tomas Krivda (CZE)	213
9	Fabian Aebersold (SUI)	189
10	Albin Ridefelt (SWE)	156

=== Women ===
Rank	Athlete	Points
1	Simona Aebersold (SUI)	600
2	Tove Alexandersson (SWE)	537
3	Natalia Gemperle (SUI)	405
4	Andrine Benjaminsen (NOR)	308
5	Hanna Lundberg (SWE)	283
6	Venla Harju (FIN)	238
7	Marie Olaussen (NOR)	213
8	Victoria Haestad Bjornstad (NOR)	198
9	Evely Kaasiku (EST)	181
10	Maija Sianoja (FIN)	178

=== Team ===
The table shows the standings after the final stage in Finland.

Rank	Nation	Points
1	Sweden	5887
2	Norway	5525
3	Switzerland	4938
4	Finland	3735
5	Czech Republic	2330
6	France	2086
7	Denmark	1673
8	(United Kingdom) Great Britain	1609
9	Estonia	1461
10	Austria	1453
