= 2025 Orienteering World Cup =

Athletic competition

The 2025 Orienteering World Cup is the 30th edition of the Orienteering World Cup. The 2025 Orienteering World Cup consists of six individual events and four relay events. The events are located in Sweden, Belgium and Switzerland.

== Events ==
=== Men ===
No.	Venue	Distance	Date	Winner	Second	Third	Ref.
Round 1 - Sweden
1	Idre, Sweden	Long	19 June	(Norway) Kasper Harlem Fosser	(Switzerland) Matthias Kyburz	(Sweden) Viktor Svensk	
2	Idre, Sweden	Middle	21 June	(Sweden) Max Peter Bejmer	(Sweden) Anton Johansson	(Sweden) Gustav Bergman	
Round 2 - Belgium
3	Hasselt, Belgium	Knockout sprint	29 August	(Sweden) August Mollén	(Sweden) Jonatan Gustafsson	(Finland) Akseli Ruohola	
4	Hasselt, Belgium	Sprint	31 August	(France) Mathias Barros Vallet	(Norway) Kasper Fosser	(Norway) Eirik Langedal Breivik	
Round 3 - Switzerland
5	Uster, Switzerland	Sprint	26 September	(Czech Republic) Tomas Krivda	(Switzerland) Matthias Kyburz	(Belgium) Yannick Michiels	
6	Uster, Switzerland	Knockout sprint	28 September	(Switzerland) Tino Polsini	(Sweden) Max Peter Bejmer	(Switzerland) Fabian Aebersold	

=== Women ===
No.	Venue	Distance	Date	Winner	Second	Third	Ref.
Round 1 - Sweden
1	Idre, Sweden	Long	19 June	(Sweden) Tove Alexandersson	(Switzerland) Simona Aebersold	(Norway) Andrine Benjaminsen	
2	Idre, Sweden	Middle	21 June	(Sweden) Tove Alexandersson	(Switzerland) Simona Aebersold	(France) Cecile Calandry	
Round 2 - Belgium
3	Hasselt, Belgium	Knockout sprint	29 August	(France) Cecile Calandry	(Norway) Pia Young Vik	(Switzerland) Simona Aebersold	
4	Hasselt, Belgium	Sprint	31 August	(Norway) Pia Young Vik	(Sweden) Hanna Lundberg	(Finland) Inka Nurminen	
Round 3 - Switzerland
5	Uster, Switzerland	Sprint	26 September	(Switzerland) Simona Aebersold	(Switzerland) Natalia Gemperle	(Norway) Pia Young Vik	
6	Uster, Switzerland	Knockout Sprint	28 September	(Switzerland) Simona Aebersold	(United Kingdom) Grace Molloy	(Czech Republic) Tereza Rauturier	

=== Relay ===
No.	Venue	Distance	Date	Winner	Second	Third	Ref.
1	Idre, Sweden	Women's relay	22 June	Switzerland Paula Gross; Natalia Gemperle; Simona Aebersold	Norway Ingrid Lundanes; Victoria Hæstad Bjørnstad; Andrine Benjaminsen	Finland Amy Nymalm; Ida Haapala; Lotta Karhola	
2	Idre, Sweden	Men's relay	22 June	Sweden Viktor Svensk; Anton Johansson; Max Peter Bejmer	Norway Lukas Liland; Kasper Harlem Fosser; Eirik Langedal Breivik	France Mathieu Perrin; Quentin Moulet; Lucas Basset	
3	Hasselt, Belgium	Sprint Relay	27 August	Norway Victoria Haestad Bjornstad; Eirik Langedal Breivik; Kasper Harlem Fosser; Andrine Benjaminsen	Switzerland Natalia Gemperle; Riccardo Rancan; Joey Hadorn; Simona Aebersold	Sweden Alva Sonesson; Jonatan Gustafsson; Martin Regborn; Hanna Lundberg	
4	Uster, Switzerland	Sprint Relay	27 September	Sweden Alva Sonesson; Jonatan Gustafsson; Martin Regborn; Hanna Lundberg	Switzerland Natalia Gemperle; Timo Suter; Tino Polsini; Simona Aebersold	Norway Victoria Haestad Bjornstad; Eirik Langedal Breivik; Kasper Harlem Fosser; Pia Young Vik	
