= 2022 Orienteering World Cup =

International orienteering competition

World Cup events
- Individual: 6
- Relay: 5

Men's World Cup
- 1st: Kasper Fosser (NOR)
- 2nd: Martin Regborn (SWE)
- 3rd: Gustav Bergman (SWE)
- Most wins: Kasper Fosser (NOR) (2)

Women's World Cup
- 1st: Tove Alexandersson (SWE)
- 2nd: Simona Aebersold (SUI)
- 3rd: Andrine Benjaminsen (NOR)
- Most wins: Tove Alexandersson (SWE) (3)

Team World Cup
- 1st: Sweden
- 2nd: Switzerland
- 3rd: Norway
- Most wins: Sweden & Switzerland (2)

The 2022 Orienteering World Cup is the 27th edition of the Orienteering World Cup. The 2022 Orienteering World Cup consists of six individual events and four relay events. The events are located in Sweden, Estonia, and Switzerland. The 2022 World Orienteering Championships in Denmark are not included in the World Cup. But the European Orienteering Championships in Estonia are part of the world cup, and non-European Orienteers can hence participate in the European Championships as well. By winning the fifth race, middle distance in Davos, Tove Alexandersson secured her eight total world cup win. Later the same day, Kasper Fosser secured his second total world cup win.

== Events ==
=== Men ===
No.	Venue	Distance	Date	Winner	Second	Third	Ref.
Round 1 – Sweden
1	Borås, Sweden	Sprint	26 May	Kasper Harlem Fosser (NOR)	Tim Robertson (NZL)	Yannick Michiels (BEL)	
2	Borås, Sweden	Knock-out sprint	28 May	Matthias Kyburz (SUI)	Tim Robertson (NZL)	August Mollén (SWE)	
Round 2 – Estonia
3	Rakvere, Estonia	Long	4 August	Martin Regborn (SWE)	Eskil Kinneberg (NOR)	Elias Kuukka (FIN)	
4	Rakvere, Estonia	Middle	6 August	Albin Ridefelt (SWE)	Anton Johansson (SWE)	Gustav Bergman (SWE)	
Round 3 – Finals
5	Davos Klosters, Switzerland	Middle	2 October	Kasper Harlem Fosser (NOR)	Albin Ridefelt (SWE)	Daniel Hubmann (SUI)	
6	Davos Klosters, Switzerland	Long	3 October	Daniel Hubmann (SUI)	Max Peter Bejmer (SWE)	Kasper Harlem Fosser (NOR)	

=== Women ===
No.	Venue	Distance	Date	Winner	Second	Third	Ref.
Round 1 – Sweden
1	Borås, Sweden	Sprint	26 May	Tove Alexandersson (SWE)	Lina Strand (SWE)	Hanna Lundberg (SWE); Simona Aebersold (SUI)	
2	Borås, Sweden	Knock-out sprint	28 May	Tove Alexandersson (SWE)	Megan Carter Davies (GBR)	Andrine Benjaminsen (NOR)	
Round 2 – Estonia
3	Rakvere, Estonia	Long	4 August	Venla Harju (FIN)	Tove Alexandersson (SWE)	Marika Teini (FIN)	
4	Rakvere, Estonia	Middle	6 August	Simona Aebersold (SUI)	Evely Kaasiku (EST)	Venla Harju (FIN)	
Round 3 – Finals
5	Davos Klosters, Switzerland	Middle	2 October	Tove Alexandersson (SWE)	Andrine Benjaminsen (NOR)	Lisa Risby (SWE)	
6	Davos Klosters, Switzerland	Long	3 October	Simona Aebersold (SUI)	Andrine Benjaminsen (NOR)	Elena Roos (SUI)	

=== Relay ===
No.	Venue	Distance	Date	Winner	Second	Third	Ref.
1	Borås, Sweden	Sprint relay	29 May	Sweden 2 Lina Strand; Martin Regborn; Emil Svensk; Karolin Ohlsson	Switzerland Simona Aebersold; Joey Hadorn; Matthias Kyburz; Elena Roos	Sweden 1 Hanna Lundberg; Max Peter Bejmer; Gustav Bergman; Tove Alexandersson	
2	Rakvere, Estonia	Men's relay	7 August	Norway 1 Magne Dæhli; Kasper Harlem Fosser; Eskil Kinneberg	Sweden 3 Viktor Svensk; Isak von Krusenstierna; Max Peter Bejmer	Switzerland 1 Daniel Hubmann; Florian Howald; Matthias Kyburz	
3	Rakvere, Estonia	Women's relay	7 August	Sweden 1 Lina Strand; Sara Hagström; Tove Alexandersson	Czech Republic 1 Vendula Horcickova; Adela Finstrlova; Tereza Janošíková	Norway 1 Ane Dyrkorn; Ingrid Lundanes; Andrine Benjaminsen	
4	Davos Klosters, Switzerland	Men's relay	1 October	Switzerland 1 Daniel Hubmann; Florian Howald; Joey Hadorn	Norway 1 Magne Dæhli; Kasper Harlem Fosser; Eskil Kinneberg	Sweden 3 Viktor Svensk; Emil Svensk; Anton Johansson	
5	Davos Klosters, Switzerland	Women's relay	1 October	Switzerland 1 Elena Roos; Sabine Hauswirth; Simona Aebersold	Sweden 1 Lisa Risby; Sara Hagström; Sanna Fast	Norway 1 Tone Bergerud Lye; Marie Olaussen; Andrine Benjaminsen	

== Points distribution ==
The 40 best runners in each event are awarded points. The winner is awarded 100 points. In WC events 1 to 7, the six best results count in the overall classification. In the finals (WC 8 and WC 9), both results count.

Rank	1	2	3	4	5	6	7	8	9	10	11	12	13	14	15	16	17	18	19	20	21	22	23	24	25	26	27	28	29	30	31	32	33	34	35	36	37	38	39	40
Points	100	80	60	50	45	40	37	35	33	31	30	29	28	27	26	25	24	23	22	21	20	19	18	17	16	15	14	13	12	11	10	9	8	7	6	5	4	3	2	1

== Overall standings ==
This section shows the overall standings after all events.

=== Men ===
Rank	Athlete	Points
1	Kasper Harlem Fosser (NOR)	382
2	Martin Regborn (SWE)	247
3	Gustav Bergman (SWE)	231
4	Emil Svensk (SWE)	214
5	Daniel Hubmann (SUI)	213
6	Olli Ojanaho (FIN)	190
7	Eskil Kinneberg (NOR)	189
8	Albin Ridefelt (SWE)	180
9	Max Peter Bejmer (SWE)	169
10	Tim Robertson (NZL)	165

=== Women ===
Rank	Athlete	Points
1	Tove Alexandersson (SWE)	452
2	Simona Aebersold (SUI)	362
3	Andrine Benjaminsen (NOR)	281
4	Lina Strand (SWE)	237
5	Marika Teini (FIN)	206
6	Venla Harju (FIN)	194
7	Elena Roos (SUI)	185
8	Tereza Janošíková (CZE)	180
9	Sabine Hauswirth (SUI)	177
10	Lisa Risby (SWE)	170

=== Team ===
The table shows the standings after all events. This was the first year when individual results counted towards the team world cup, meaning competitors contributed to the team's score in both relay and individual events.

Rank	Nation	Points
1	Sweden	7677
2	Switzerland	6293
3	Norway	5901
4	Finland	4064
5	Czech Republic	3367
6	France	2580
7	(United Kingdom) Great Britain	2525
8	Denmark	2324
9	Austria	2190
10	Poland	2185
