= 2023 Orienteering World Cup =

28th edition of the Orienteering World Cup

World Cup events
- Individual: 7
- Relay: 3

Men's World Cup
- 1st: Matthias Kyburz (SUI)
- 2nd: Kasper Fosser (NOR)
- 3rd: Gustav Bergman (SWE)
- Most wins: Kasper Fosser (NOR) (3)

Women's World Cup
- 1st: Tove Alexandersson (SWE)
- 2nd: Sara Hagström (SWE)
- 3rd: Simona Aebersold (SUI)
- Most wins: Tove Alexandersson (SWE) (5)

Team World Cup
- 1st: Sweden
- 2nd: Switzerland
- 3rd: Norway
- Most wins: Sweden (3)

The 2023 Orienteering World Cup is the 28th edition of the Orienteering World Cup. The 2023 Orienteering World Cup consists of seven individual events and three relay events. The events are located in Norway, the Czech Republic, and Italy. The 2023 World Orienteering Championships in Switzerland are not included in the World Cup, but the European Orienteering Championships in Italy are part of the World Cup program. Non-European Orienteers can hence participate in the European Championships as well. Russian and Belarusian competitors are still banned, but this season saw Natalia Gemperle returning to the world cup, now competing for Switzerland.

The season started in Østfold, Norway, with a long distance race won by reigning champions Tove Alexandersson and Kasper Harlem Fosser. Fosser also won the middle distance but Alexandersson finished in second place, ten seconds behind teammate Sara Hagström. Both the relays were won by Swedish teams.

When the season continued in Česká Lípa all individual women's races were won by Tove Alexandersson, giving her a 130 point lead ahead of Sara Hagström in the world cup, almost securing her ninth total world cup win. On the men's side the races were won by Ralph Street, Jannis Bonek and Kasper Fosser. The relay was won by the Swiss team before the Czech and Swedish teams.

The World Cup Finals included the European Orienteering Championships and competitions were held in northern Italy. In the Sprint, Matthias Kyburz won with 4 seconds ahead of Kasper Fosser, putting Kyburz only 23 points behind Fosser in the World Cup standings heading into the Knock Out Sprint. In the Women's class, Hagström was the winner ahead of Alexandersson, but Alexandersson's 80 points for finishing second place was still enough to guarantee her the overall world cup victory with one round still to go, her score of 560 points now being impossible to reach for second placed Hagström even if Alexandersson did not finish and Hagström won the final round. By winning the overall world cup, Tove Alexandersson tied with Simone Niggli with 9 overall wins and one overall second place.

In the Knock Out Sprint, Alexandersson won the final round to end her season with 5 victories from 7 races. In the Men's class, a quarter final collision between current world cup leader Kasper Fosser and Swiss runner Joey Hadorn lead to both runners being unable to finish, leaving the World Cup open to Kyburz to overtake Fosser and win the World Cup if he finished in 4th place or better in his semi-final. In the end, Kyburz easily surpassed this, winning the Knock Out Sprint outright to take his 6th World Cup overall victory and his first since 2018.

== Events ==
=== Men ===
No.	Venue	Distance	Date	Winner	Second	Third	Ref.
Round 1 – Norway
1	Østfold, Norway	Long	27 April	Kasper Harlem Fosser (NOR)	Emil Svensk (SWE)	Martin Regborn (SWE)	
2	Østfold, Norway	Middle	29 April	Kasper Harlem Fosser (NOR)	Matthias Kyburz (SUI)	Gustav Bergman (SWE)	
Round 2 – Czech Republic
3	Česká Lípa, Czech Republic	Sprint	2 August	Ralph Street (GBR)	Gustav Bergman (SWE)	Yannick Michiels (BEL)	
4	Česká Lípa, Czech Republic	Middle	5 August	Jannis Bonek (AUT)	Albin Ridefelt (SWE)	Matthias Kyburz (SUI)	
5	Česká Lípa, Czech Republic	Long	6 August	Kasper Fosser (NOR)	Matthias Kyburz (SUI)	Gustav Bergman (SWE)	
Round 3 – Italy
6	Verona, Italy	Sprint	4 October	Matthias Kyburz (SUI)	Kasper Fosser (NOR)	Tuomas Heikkila (FIN)	
7	Verona, Italy	Knock-Out sprint	8 October	Matthias Kyburz (SUI)	Jonatan Gustafsson (SWE)	Emil Svensk (SWE)	

=== Women ===
No.	Venue	Distance	Date	Winner	Second	Third	Ref.
Round 1 – Norway
1	Østfold, Norway	Long	26 April	Tove Alexandersson (SWE)	Sara Hagström (SWE)	Marie Olaussen (NOR)	
2	Østfold, Norway	Middle	28 April	Sara Hagström (SWE)	Tove Alexandersson (SWE)	Natalia Gemperle (SUI)	
Round 2 – Czech Republic
3	Česká Lípa, Czech Republic	Sprint	2 August	Tove Alexandersson (SWE)	Natalia Gemperle (SUI)	Sara Hagström (SWE)	
4	Česká Lípa, Czech Republic	Middle	5 August	Tove Alexandersson (SWE)	Simona Aebersold (SUI)	Sanna Fast (SWE)	
5	Česká Lípa, Czech Republic	Long	6 August	Tove Alexandersson (SWE)	Simona Aebersold (SUI)	Sara Hagström (SWE)	
Round 3 – Finals
6	Verona, Italy	Sprint	4 October	Sara Hagström (SWE)	Tove Alexandersson (SWE)	Simona Aebersold (SUI)	
7	Vicenza, Italy	Knock-Out sprint	8 October	Tove Alexandersson (SWE)	Elena Roos (SUI)	Natalia Gemperle (SUI)	

=== Relay ===
No.	Venue	Distance	Date	Winner	Second	Third	Ref.
1	Østfold, Norway	Men's relay	30 April	Sweden 1 Martin Regborn; Emil Svensk; Gustav Bergman	Finland 1 Topi Syrjalainen; Olli Ojanaho; Miika Kirmula	Norway 2 Gaute Steiwer; Eirik Langedal Breivik; Havard Sandstad Eidsmo	
2	Østfold, Norway	Women's relay	30 April	Sweden 2 Karolin Ohlsson; Elin Månsson; Lisa Risby	Switzerland 1 Elena Roos; Natalia Gemperle; Simona Aebersold	Norway 1 Marianne Andersen; Tone Bergerud Lye; Andrine Benjaminsen	
3	Česká Lípa, Czech Republic	Sprint relay	3 August	Switzerland 1 Simona Aebersold; Joey Hadorn; Matthias Kyburz; Elena Roos	Czech Republic 1 Denisa Kosová; Jakub Glonek; Tomáš Křivda; Tereza Janošíková	Sweden 1 Sara Hagström; Jonatan Gustafsson; Gustav Bergman; Emma Bjessmo	
4	Soave, Italy	Sprint relay	6 October	Sweden Tove Alexandersson; Jonatan Gustafsson; Martin Regborn; Sara Hagstrom	Switzerland Simona Aebersold; Joey Hadorn; Matthias Kyburz; Elena Roos	Finland Inka Nurminen; Teemu Oksanen; Tuomas Heikkila; Venla Harju	

== Points distribution ==
The 40 best runners in each event are awarded points. The winner is awarded 100 points. In WC events 1 to 7, the six best results count in the overall classification. In the finals (WC 8 and WC 9), both results count.

Rank	1	2	3	4	5	6	7	8	9	10	11	12	13	14	15	16	17	18	19	20	21	22	23	24	25	26	27	28	29	30	31	32	33	34	35	36	37	38	39	40
Points	100	80	60	50	45	40	37	35	33	31	30	29	28	27	26	25	24	23	22	21	20	19	18	17	16	15	14	13	12	11	10	9	8	7	6	5	4	3	2	1

== Overall standings ==
This section shows the standings after the events in Italy.

=== Men ===
Rank	Athlete	Points
1	Matthias Kyburz (SUI)	520
2	Kasper Harlem Fosser (NOR)	461
3	Gustav Bergman (SWE)	290
4	Emil Svensk (SWE)	260
5	Ralph Street (GBR)	243
6	Martin Regborn (SWE)	237
7	Jannis Bonek (AUT)	220
8	Tomas Krivda (CZE)	184
9	Joey Hadorn (SUI)	182
10	Jonatan Gustafsson (SWE)	157

=== Women ===
Rank	Athlete	Points
1	Tove Alexandersson (SWE)	660
2	Sara Hagström (SWE)	495
3	Simona Aebersold (SUI)	367
4	Natalia Gemperle (SUI)	365
5	Elena Roos (SUI)	246
6	Marie Olaussen (NOR)	191
7	Aleksandra Hornik (POL)	166
8	Hanna Lundberg (SWE)	160
9	Andrea Svensson (SWE)	149
10	Elin Månsson (SWE)	143

=== Team ===
The table shows the standings after the final stage in Italy.

Rank	Nation	Points
1	Sweden	8135
2	Switzerland	7510
3	Norway	4715
4	Finland	4104
5	Czech Republic	3806
6	France	3021
7	Denmark	2549
8	(United Kingdom) Great Britain	2365
9	Poland	2123
10	Spain	2120
