= 2026 European Orienteering Championships =

Overview of the 2026 edition of European Orienteering Championships

- Venue: Petroškai–Klepočiai forest area
- Location: Druskininkai, Lithuania
- Dates: 23–27 September

The 2026 European Orienteering Championships were held from 23 to 27 September 2026 in Druskininkai, Lithuania.

== Medal table ==
Rank	Nation	Gold	Silver	Bronze	Total
1	Sweden	3	1	3	7
2	Norway	2	2	0	4
3	Switzerland	1	3	1	5
4	Finland	0	0	2	2
Totals (4 entries)		6	6	6	18

== Men ==
Event	Gold		Silver		Bronze	
Middle distance	Kasper Harlem Fosser; Norway	32:56	Anton Johansson; Sweden	34:30	Fabian Aebersold; Switzerland	34:55
Long distance	Kasper Harlem Fosser; Norway	1:34:03	Fabian Aebersold; Switzerland	1:35:12	Viktor Svensk; Sweden	1:35:23
Team	Switzerland 1 Daniel Hubmann; Matthieu Bührer; Fabian Aebersold	1:38:24	Norway 1 Lukas Liland; Eirik Langedal Breivik; Kasper Fosser	1:38:26	Sweden 2 Simon Imark; Simon Hector; Emil Svensk	1:38:30

== Women ==
Event	Gold		Silver		Bronze	
Middle distance	Hanna Lundberg; Sweden	33:20	Pia Young Vik; Norway	33:36	Venla Harju; Finland	34:03
Long distance	Tove Alexandersson; Sweden	1:29:40	Simona Aebersold; Switzerland	1:30:29	Sanna Fast; Sweden	1:34:05
Team	Sweden 1 Hanna Lundberg; Sanna Fast; Tove Alexandersson	1:37:35	Switzerland 1 Sofie Bachmann; Natalia Gemperle; Simona Aebersold	1:38:38	Finland 2 Eeva-Liina Ojanaho; Hanne Hilo; Ida Haapala	1:39:13
