= 2023 European Orienteering Championships =

203 European Orienteering Championships
- Location: Verona, Italy
- Dates: 4–8 October 2023

The 2023 European Orienteering Championships was held from 4 to 8 October 2023 in Verona, Italy.

== Men ==
Event	Gold		Silver		Bronze	
Sprint	Matthias Kyburz; Switzerland	12:26	Kasper Fosser; Norway	12:30	Tuomas Heikkilä; Finland	12:31
Knock-out sprint	Matthias Kyburz; Switzerland	5:51,2	Jonatan Gustafsson; Sweden	5:53,1	Emil Svensk; Sweden	5:53,2

== Women ==
Event	Gold		Silver		Bronze	
Sprint	Sara Hagström; Sweden	12:17	Tove Alexandersson; Sweden	12:25	Simona Aebersold; Switzerland	12:40
Knock-out sprint	Tove Alexandersson; Sweden	6:38,7	Elena Roos; Switzerland	6:42,3	Natalie Gemperle; Switzerland	6:46,8

== Mixed ==
Event	Gold		Silver		Bronze	
Sprint relay	Sweden; Tove Alexandersson; Jonatan Gustafsson; Martin Regborn; Sara Hagström	1:02.35,20	Switzerland; Simona Aebersold; Joey Hadorn; Matthias Kyburz; Elena Roos	1:03.11,30	Finland; Inka Nurminen; Teemu Oksanen; Tuomas Heikkilä; Venla Harju	1:03.28,60
