= 2021 European Orienteering Championships =

- Location: Neuchâtel, Switzerland
- Dates: 13–16 May

The 2021 European Orienteering Championships was held from 13 to 16 May 2021 in Neuchâtel, Switzerland.

== Medal summary ==
=== Medal table ===
* Host nation (Switzerland)

Rank	Nation	Gold	Silver	Bronze	Total
1	Sweden	3	1	1	5
2	Switzerland*	2	3	1	6
3	Belgium	0	1	0	1
4	Norway	0	0	4	4
Totals (4 entries)		5	5	6	16

=== Men ===
Event	Gold		Silver		Bronze	
Sprint	Emil Svensk; Sweden	16:06	Yannick Michiels; Belgium	16:19	Kasper Fosser; Norway Gustav Bergman; Sweden	16:28
Knock-out sprint	Matthias Kyburz; Switzerland	6:30	Joey Hadorn; Switzerland	6:31	Kasper Fosser; Norway	6:33

=== Women ===
Event	Gold		Silver		Bronze	
Sprint	Tove Alexandersson; Sweden	16:10	Elena Roos; Switzerland	16:15	Simona Aebersold; Switzerland	16:16
Knock-out sprint	Tove Alexandersson; Sweden	6:49	Simona Aebersold; Switzerland	6:57	Andrine Benjaminsen; Norway	7:07

=== Mixed ===
Event	Gold		Silver		Bronze	
Sprint relay	Switzerland; Simona Aebersold; Joey Hadorn; Matthias Kyburz; Elena Roos	56:55	Sweden; Lina Strand; Gustav Bergman; Emil Svensk; Sara Hagström	57:50	Norway; Victoria Hæstad Bjørnstad; Eskil Kinneberg; Kasper Fosser; Andrine Benjaminsen	58:24
