= Riccardo Scalet =

Italian orienteer

Medal record
Representing Italy
Junior World Championships
Silver medal – second place	2014 Zheleznica	Middle

Riccardo Scalet is an Italian foot orienteering competitor and medalist in the Junior World Championships. He now lives in Transacqua.

In 2021, Scalet became one of the first Italian orienteers to receive a medal in a World Cup event. In the World Cup Finals, held in Cansiglio in northern Italy, Scalet came third behind Kasper Harlem Fosser and Matthias Kyburz.

== See also ==
- Italian orienteers
- List of orienteers
