= Kasper Fosser =

Norwegian orienteer (born 1999)

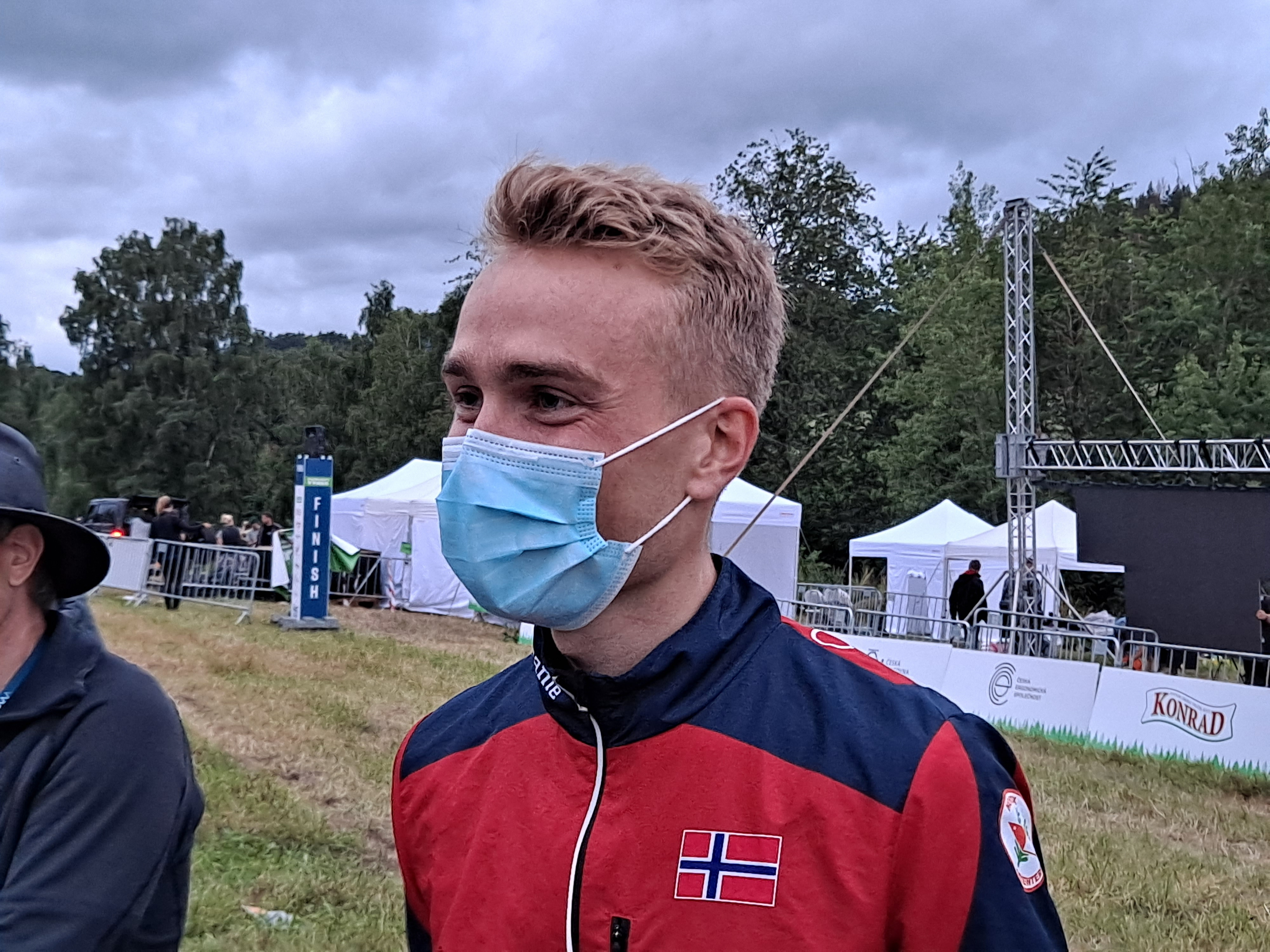
- Kasper Harlem Fosser at WOC 2021

Personal information
- Nationality: Norwegian
- Born: 1999 (age 26–27)
- Relatives: Per Fosser (grandfather)
- Awards: Egebergs Ærespris (2025)

Sport
- Sport: Orienteering
- Club: IL Heming; IFK Göteborg
Medal record
Representing Norway
Men's orienteering
World Championships
Gold medal – first place	2021 Doksy	Long
Gold medal – first place	2022 Triangle Region	Sprint
Gold medal – first place	2023 Grisons	Long
Gold medal – first place	2025 Kuopio	Long
Gold medal – first place	2025 Kuopio	Relay
Gold medal – first place	2026 Genova	Sprint
Silver medal – second place	2019 Østfold	Long
Silver medal – second place	2021 Doksy	Sprint
Silver medal – second place	2021 Doksy	Mixed sprint relay
Silver medal – second place	2021 Doksy	Relay
Silver medal – second place	2025 Kuopio	Middle
Bronze medal – third place	2022 Triangle Region	Mixed sprint relay
Bronze medal – third place	2024 Edinburgh	Mixed sprint relay
Bronze medal – third place	2026 Genova	Mixed sprint relay
World Cup
Gold medal – first place	2021	WC Overall
Gold medal – first place	2022	WC Overall
Silver medal – second place	2023	WC Overall
Gold medal – first place	2024	WC Overall
Silver medal – second place	2025	WC Overall
Gold medal – first place	2026	WC Overall
World Games
Gold medal – first place	2022 Birmingham	Individual
Silver medal – second place	2022 Birmingham	Mixed sprint relay
European Championships
Gold medal – first place	2022 Rakvere	Relay
Gold medal – first place	2024 Mór	Long
Gold medal – first place	2024 Mór	Relay
Gold medal – first place	2025 Hasselt	Mixed sprint relay
Gold medal – first place	2026 Druskininkai	Long
Gold medal – first place	2026 Druskininkai	Middle
Silver medal – second place	2023 Verona	Sprint
Silver medal – second place	2024 Mór	Middle
Silver medal – second place	2025 Hasselt	Sprint
Silver medal – second place	2026 Druskininkai	Relay
Bronze medal – third place	2021 Neuchâtel	Sprint
Bronze medal – third place	2021 Neuchâtel	Knock-out sprint
Bronze medal – third place	2021 Neuchâtel	Mixed sprint relay
Junior World Championships
Gold medal – first place	2017 Tampere	Relay
Gold medal – first place	2018 Kecskemét	Long
Gold medal – first place	2018 Kecskemét	Relay
Gold medal – first place	2019 Silkeborg	Long
Gold medal – first place	2019 Silkeborg	Middle
Gold medal – first place	2019 Silkeborg	Relay
Bronze medal – third place	2018 Kecskemét	Sprint

Kasper Harlem Fosser (born 1999) is a Norwegian orienteering competitor who represents Norwegian club IL Heming and Swedish club IFK Göteborg.

His achievements include winning the overall Orienteering World Cup three times, in 2021, 2022 and 2024, and four individual gold medals at the World Orienteering Championships.

He was awarded the Egebergs Ærespris in 2025.

== Orienteering career ==
=== 2019 ===
Fosser won a silver medal at the 2019 World Orienteering Championships in Østfold, and has won gold medals in both long distance, middle distance and relay in the Junior World Orienteering Championships.

=== 2021 ===
He won a gold medal in long distance at the 2021 World Orienteering Championships in Doksy, and silver medal in the sprint at the same championships, behind Isac von Krusenstierna. Fosser won the long distance, held near Heřmánky, in a time of 1:35:55, ahead of Matthias Kyburz and Magne Daehli.

He won the overall 2021 Orienteering World Cup ahead of Matthias Kyburz, with 460 points, having three race victories.

=== 2022 ===
At the 2022 World Orienteering Championships he won the gold medal in the individual sprint, and a bronze in the mixed sprint relay.

He also won the overall 2022 Orienteering World Cup ahead of Martin Regborn, scoring 382 points, with two individual race victories.

=== 2023 ===
He won a gold medal in the long distance at the 2023 World Orienteering Championships, after a close fight with Matthias Kyburz. In October 2023 he won a silver medal in sprint at the European Orienteering Championships in Verona.

He placed second overall in the 2023 Orienteering World Cup, behind Kyburz.

=== 2024 ===
Competing at the 2024 World Orienteering Championships in Edinburgh in July 2024, he qualified for the sprint final, where he placed 17th. Two days later Fosser ran the third leg for Norway in the mixed sprint relay. The Norwegian team, which also included Victoria Hæstad Bjørnstad, Eirik Langedal Breivik and Andrine Benjaminsen, won bronze medals in the relay.

He won a silver medal in the middle distance at the 2024 European Orienteering Championships in Hungary, behind Eirik Langedal Breivik. The next day he won a gold medal in the long distance at the championships, ahead of Daniel Hubmann. Fosser was running the last leg in the relay at the 2024 European Championships, winning gold medal for Norway along with Eirik Langedal Breivik and Eskil Kinneberg.

=== 2025 ===
In 2025, Fosser won the silver medal in the middle distance at the 2025 World Orienteering Championships, behind Eirik Langedal Breivik. He went on to win the gold medal in the long distance the following day. He won a gold medal in the relay with the Norwegian team, along with Jørgen Baklid and Eirik Langedal Breivik, ahead of Switzerland (silver) and Finland (bronze).

At the European Orienteering Championships in Belgium in August 2025, Fosser won a gold medal in the mixed sprint relay with the Norwegian team, along with Victoria Hæstad Bjørnstad, Eirik Langedal Breivik, and Andrine Benjaminsen. He later won a silver medal in sprint at the same championships.

In September 2025 he won a national title in the middle distance, which also earned hin the Kongepokal trophy.

=== 2026 ===
In July 2026, Fosser won the gold medal in individual sprint at the 2026 World Orienteering Championships. He also won a bronze medal in the mixed sprint relay, along with Victoria Hæstad Bjørnstad, Eirik Langedal Breivik, and Pia Young Vik.

At the European Orienteering Championships in Lithuania in September 2026, Fosser won gold medals both in the long distance and the middle distance.

== Skyrunning ==
Fosser has also competed in skyrunning, winning the U23 category in the combined Youth Skyrunning World Championships in 2021.

== Personal life ==
Fosser is a grandson of former international orienteer Per Fosser.

== Awards and recognition ==
In 2025 Fosser was awarded Egebergs Ærespris ("Honorary Prize of Egeberg") for excelling in both orientering and cross country running.

== Results ==
=== World Championship results ===
Year
Year	Age	Long	Middle	Sprint	Relay	Sprint; Relay	Knock Out; Sprint
2019	20	2	—	—N/a	—	—N/a	—N/a
2021	22	1	5	2	2	2	—N/a
2022	23	—N/a	—N/a	1	—N/a	3	—
2023	24	1	7	—N/a	4	—N/a	—N/a
2024	25	—N/a	—N/a	17	—N/a	3	sf
2025	26	1	2	—N/a	1	—N/a	—N/a
