= 2021 World Orienteering Championships =

2021 edition of the World Orienteering Championships

- Location: Doksy, Czech Republic
- Dates: 3–9 July

The 2021 World Orienteering Championships were held from 3 to 9 July 2021 in Doksy, Czech Republic.

== Schedule ==
Date	Event	Location
3 July	Sprint	Terezín
4 July	Sprint relay	Doksy
5 July	Rest day	
6 July	Middle distance	Smržovka
7 July	Rest day	
8 July	Relay	Heřmánky
9 July	Long distance	Heřmánky

== Medal summary ==
=== Medal table ===
Rank	Nation	Gold	Silver	Bronze	Total
1	Sweden	7	1	0	8
2	Norway	1	4	2	7
3	Switzerland	1	2	4	7
4	Neutral Athletes	0	2	0	2
5	Denmark	0	0	1	1
5	New Zealand	0	0	1	1
5	Ukraine	0	0	1	1
Totals (7 entries)		9	9	9	27

=== Men ===
Event	Gold		Silver		Bronze	
Sprint	Isac von Krusenstierna; Sweden	13:46	Kasper Fosser; Norway	13:53	Tim Robertson; New Zealand	13:59
Middle distance	Matthias Kyburz; Switzerland	39:31	Gustav Bergman; Sweden	40:11	Ruslan Glibov; Ukraine	40:18
Long distance	Kasper Fosser; Norway	1:35:55	Matthias Kyburz; Switzerland	1:39:00	Magne Dæhli; Norway	1:41:53
Relay	Sweden; Albin Ridefelt; William Lind; Gustav Bergman	1:53:06	Norway; Gaute Hallan Steiwer; Kasper Harlem Fosser; Eskil Kinneberg	1:53:57	Switzerland; Martin Hubmann; Florian Howald; Matthias Kyburz	1:55:06

=== Women ===
Event	Gold		Silver		Bronze	
Sprint	Tove Alexandersson; Sweden	14:03	Natalia Gemperle; Neutral Athletes	14:12	Maja Alm; Denmark	14:20
Middle distance	Tove Alexandersson; Sweden	38:12	Andrine Benjaminsen; Norway	40:33	Simona Aebersold; Switzerland	41:33
Long distance	Tove Alexandersson; Sweden	1:17:11	Natalia Gemperle; Neutral Athletes	1:20:09	Simona Aebersold; Switzerland	1:20:28
Relay	Sweden; Lisa Risby; Sara Hagström; Tove Alexandersson	1:45:45	Switzerland; Elena Roos; Sabine Hauswirth; Simona Aebersold	1:48:18	Norway; Marie Olaussen; Kamilla Steiwer; Andrine Benjaminsen	1:52:46

=== Mixed ===
Event	Gold		Silver		Bronze	
Sprint relay	Sweden; Tove Alexandersson; Emil Svensk; Gustav Bergman; Sara Hagström	1:02:19	Norway; Victoria Hæstad Bjørnstad; Audun Heimdal; Kasper Fosser; Andrine Benjaminsen	1:02:45	Switzerland; Simona Aebersold; Joey Hadorn; Martin Hubmann; Elena Roos	1:02:48
