= Tuomas Heikkilä =

Finnish orienteer (born 1998)

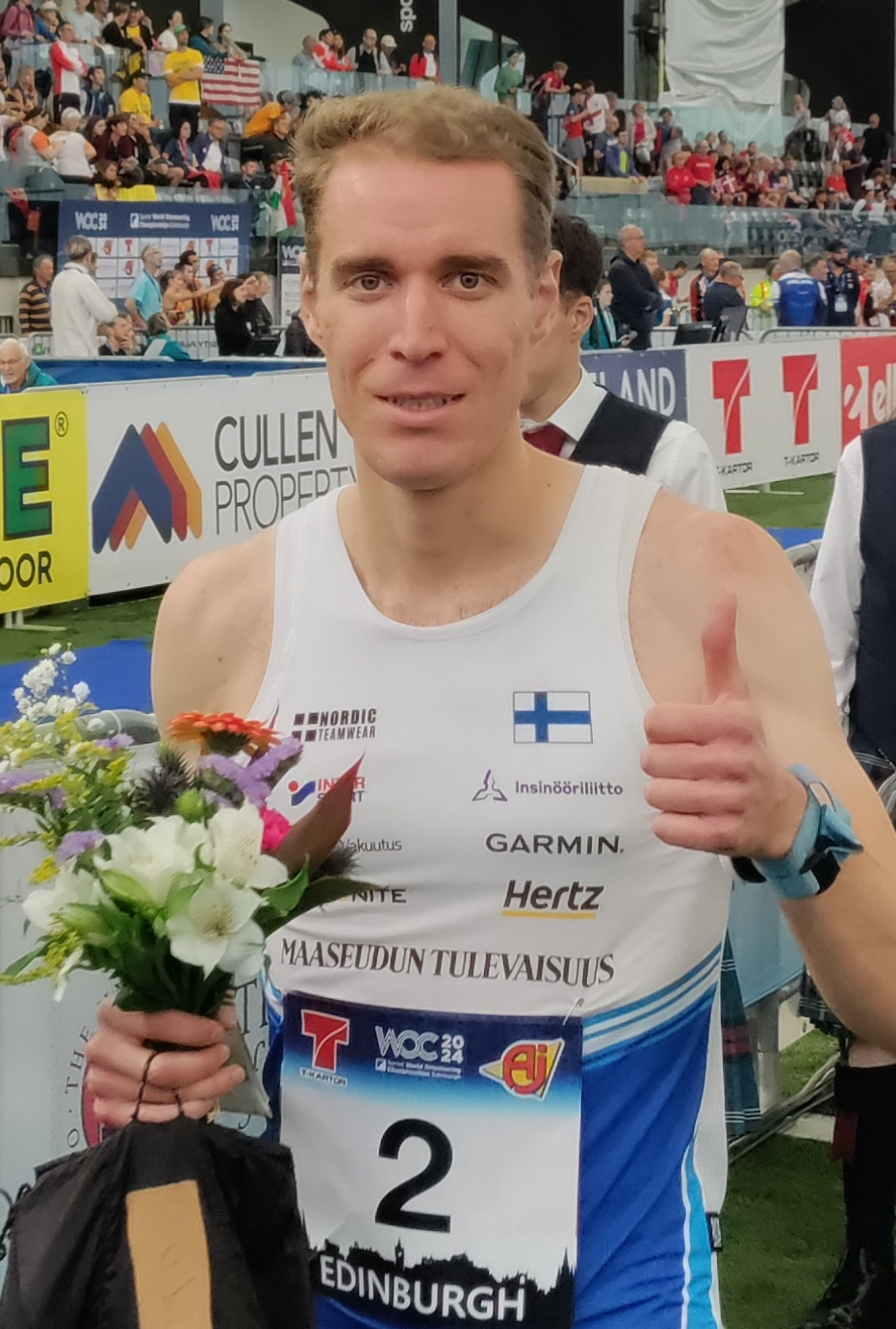
- Tuomas Heikkilä at the 2024 World Orienteering Championships

Personal information
- Born: 1998 (age 27–28)

Sport
- Sport: Orienteering; Athletics (long-distance running)
- Club: Helsingin Suunnistajat
Medal record
Representing Finland
Men's orienteering
World Championships
| Silver medal – second place | 2024 Edinburgh | Sprint relay |
European Championships
| Bronze medal – third place | 2023 Verona | Sprint |
| Bronze medal – third place | 2023 Verona | Mixed sprint relay |

Tuomas Heikkilä (born 1998) is a Finnish orienteering competitor and long-distance runner. His achievements in orienteering include winning national title, and bronze medals at the European Orienteering Championships.

== Sports career ==
Born in 1998, Heikkilä competes in orienteering, representing the club Helsingin Suunnistajat. He also competes in athletics, in long-distance running.

=== 2023 ===
Heikkilä won a bronze medal in sprint at the 2023 European Orienteering Championships, one second behind silver medalist Kasper Fosser, and one second ahead of Martin Regborn and Ralph Street. At the same championships he won a bronze medal in the mixed relay, with the Finnish team. In 2023 he also won the national title in sprint orienteering.

=== 2024 ===
Competing at the 2024 World Orienteering Championships in Edinburgh, he qualified for the sprint final, where he placed eighth.

=== 2026 ===
In July 2026 Heikkilä won a bronze medal in individual sprint at the 2026 World Orienteering Championships in Genova.
