= Eskil Kinneberg =

Norwegian orienteer (born 1992)

Personal information
- Born: 17 May 1992 (age 34)
- Spouse: Lisa Risby

Sport
- Sport: Orienteering
- Club: IFK Göteborg; OK Kåre
Medal record
Representing Norway
Men's orienteering
World Championships
Gold medal – first place	2017 Tartu	Relay
Gold medal – first place	2018 Latvia	Middle
Gold medal – first place	2018 Latvia	Relay
Silver medal – second place	2021 Doksy	Relay
European Championships
Gold medal – first place	2018 Cadempino	Relay
Gold medal – first place	2022 Rakvere	Relay
Gold medal – first place	2024 Mór	Relay
Silver medal – second place	2016 Jeseník	Relay
Silver medal – second place	2022 Rakvere	Long
Bronze medal – third place	2021 Neuchâtel	Mixed sprint relay
Junior World Championships
Gold medal – first place	2010 Aalborg	Relay
Gold medal – first place	2012 Košice	Long
Bronze medal – third place	2012 Košice	Sprint
Bronze medal – third place	2012 Košice	Relay

Eskil Kinneberg (born 17 May 1992) is a Norwegian orienteer. In addition to winning individual gold medal at the Orienteering World Championships and individual silver medal at the European championships, he has won eight medals with Norwegian teams in the relays at the world and European championships, including several victories.

== Career ==
At the 2017 World Orienteering Championships in Tartu, Estonia, Kinneberg placed fifth in the long distance, eighth in the middle distance, and won a gold medal in the relay (with Olav Lundanes and Magne Dæhli).

He won a gold medal in the middle distance at the 2018 World Orienteering Championships in Latvia, ahead of Daniel Hubmann and Florian Howald. This was Kinneberg's first individual world championships medal. He was also part of the Norwegian gold-winning relay team at the 2018 World Championships, running the second leg, with Gaute Hallan Steiwer running the first leg, and Magne Dæhli the third. He won a gold medal in the relay at the 2018 European Championships, along with Magne Dæhli and Olav Lundanes.

At the 2021 World Orienteering Championships Kinneberg was part of the Norwegian relay team tha won silver medal, along with Gaute Steiwer and Kasper Fosser. He took part in the mixed sprint relay at the 2021 European championships in Neuchâtel, where the Norwegian team (Victoria Hæstad Bjørnstad, Kinneberg, Kasper Fosser and Andrine Benjaminsen) won a bronze medal.

He won a silver medal in the long distance at the 2022 European Orienteering Championships, behind Martin Regborn. He was also part of the Norwegian relay team that won gold medals at the 2022 European championships.

He placed seventh in the middle distance at the 2024 European Orienteering Championships in Hungary. Kinneberg was running the first leg in the relay at the 2024 European Championships, winning gold medal for Norway along with Eirik Langedal Breivik and Kasper Fosser.

With his club IFK Göteborg, Kinneberg won the 2017 Jukola relay.

== World Championship results ==
Year
Year	Age	Long	Middle	Sprint	Relay	Sprint; Relay
2016	24	—	18	11	—	5
2017	25	5	8	—	1	—
2018	26	6	1	—	1	—
