= Eirik Langedal Breivik =

Norwegian orienteer (born 1998)

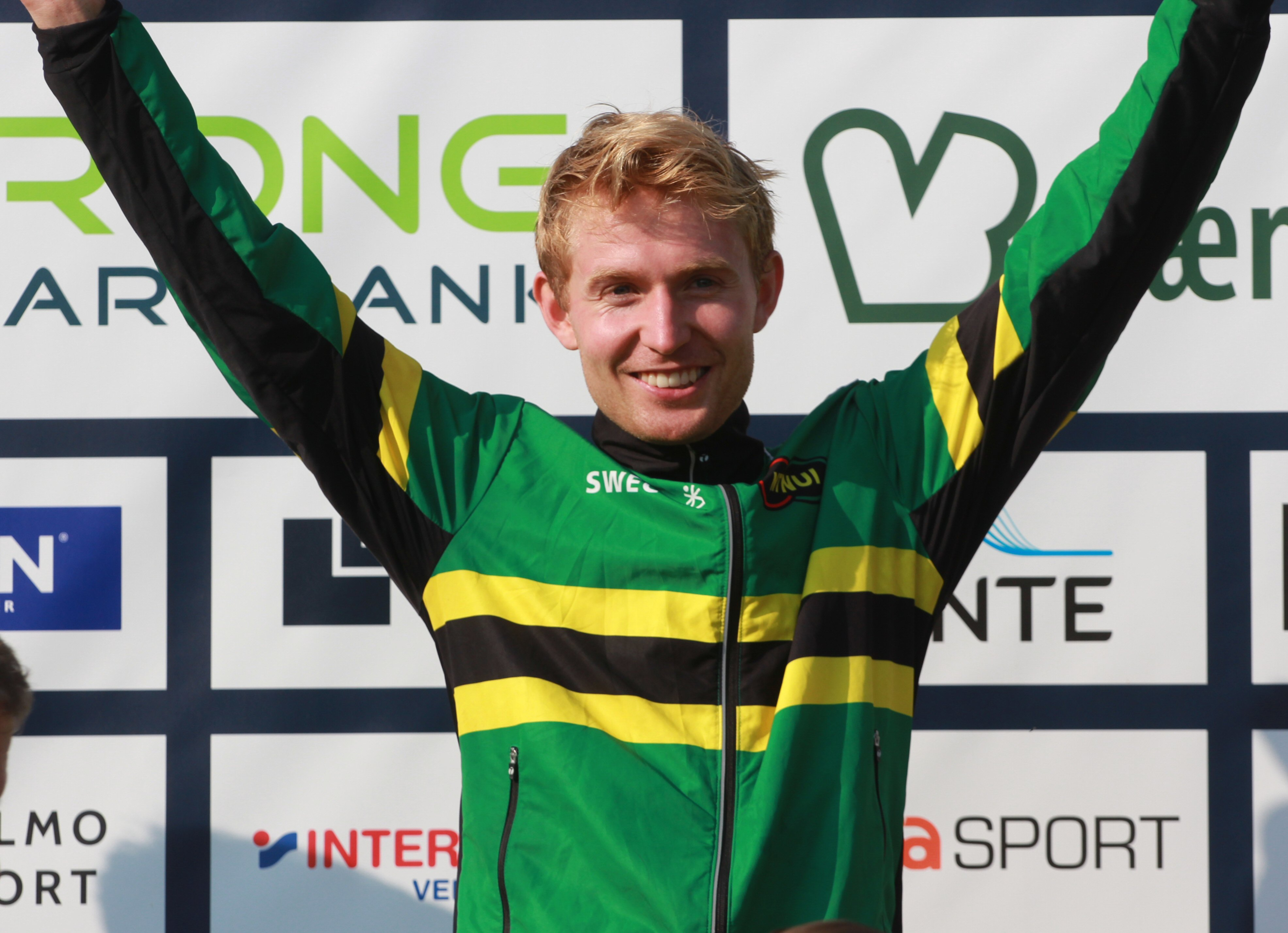

Personal information
- Born: 1998 (age 27–28)

Sport
- Sport: Orienteering
- Club: NTNUI; Nydalens SK
Medal record
Representing Norway
Men's orienteering
World Championships
Gold medal – first place	2025 Kuopio	Middle
Gold medal – first place	2025 Kuopio	Relay
Bronze medal – third place	2024 Edinburgh	Mixed sprint relay
Bronze medal – third place	2026 Genova	Mixed sprint relay
European Championships
Gold medal – first place	2024 Mór	Middle
Gold medal – first place	2024 Mór	Relay
Gold medal – first place	2025 Hasselt	Mixed sprint relay
Bronze medal – third place	2025 Hasselt	Sprint

Eirik Langedal Breivik (born 1998) is a Norwegian World and European champion in orienteering. He won the 2024 European Championships and 2025 World Orienteering Championships, both in the middle distance.

== Personal life ==
Born in 1998, Breivik hails from Korsvoll and is educated as a physiotherapist. As of 2024, he worked as an apprentice physiotherapist at a children's department in Trondheim.

== Sports career ==
Breivik represents the clubs NTNUI and Nydalens SK.

=== 2023 ===
Competing in the 2023 Orienteering World Cup, Breivik placed 27th overall, with 72 points. In April 2023 he was part of a team placing third in a world cup relay event.

Also in 2023, Breivik was a part of the NTNUI team that won the Tiomila relay held in Skellefteå, which was the first time NTNUI had ever won the relay. Breivik ran the 8th leg.

=== 2024 ===
Competing at the 2024 World Orienteering Championships in Edinburgh, he qualified for the sprint final, but in the final he was disqualified after mispunching. Two days later Breivik ran the second leg for Norway in the mixed sprint relay. The Norwegian team, which also included Victoria Hæstad Bjørnstad, Kasper Fosser, and Andrine Benjaminsen, won bronze medals in the relay.

He won a gold medal in the middle distance at the 2024 European Orienteering Championships in Hungary, ahead of Kasper Fosser. Breivik was running the second leg in the relay at the 2024 European Championships, winning gold medal for Norway along with Eskil Kinneberg and Kasper Fosser.

=== 2025 ===
In May 2025, Breivik ran the last leg for the victorious NTNUI team at the Tiomila relay in Finspång. This was the second time that Breivik won the relay, and Breivik decided the relay on the last leg, breaking away early from a group including Gustav Bergman, Emil Svensk and Albin Ridefelt.

In July 2025, Breivik won the Middle Distance at the World Orienteering Championships, also ahead of Kasper Fosser in second place, similar to his European Championships victory the previous year. He won a gold medal in the relay at the world championships with the Norwegian team, along with Jørgen Baklid and Kasper Fosser, ahead of Switzerland (silver) and Finland (bronze).

At the European Orienteering Championships in Belgium in August 2025, Breivik won a gold medal in the mixed sprint relay with the Norwegian team, along with Victoria Hæstad Bjørnstad, Kasper Fosser, and Andrine Benjaminsen. Breivik run the second leg, and finished his leg in the lead. He later won a bronze medal in sprint at the same championships.

=== 2026 ===
In July 2026 he won a bronze medal in the mixed sprint relay at the 2026 World Orienteering Championships in Genova, along with Victoria Hæstad Bjørnstad, Kasper Fosser, and Pia Young Vik.
