= 2017 World Orienteering Championships =

2017 edition of the World Orienteering Championships

- Host city: Tartu
- Country: Estonia
- Opening: 30 June 2017
- Closing: 7 July 2017
- Website: www.woc2017.ee

The 34th World Orienteering Championships were held in Tartu, Estonia in June/July 2017. The official name of the event is Nokian Tyres World Orienteering Championships 2017 after the title sponsor Nokian Tyres.

== Event dates and locations ==
Event locations within Estonia

Date	Discipline	Location
30.06.	Sprint Qualification	Tartu
30.06.	Opening Ceremony	Tartu
01.07.	Sprint Final	Tartu
02.07.	Sprint Relay	Viljandi
03.07.	rest day	
04.07.	Long Distance	Rõuge
05.07.	rest day	
06.07.	Middle Distance	Vitipalu (Nõo)
07.07.	Relay	Vitipalu (Nõo)

== Results ==
Event	Gold		Silver		Bronze	
Men's sprint	Daniel Hubmann (SUI)	14:30.6	Frederic Tranchand (FRA)	14:33.5	Jerker Lysell (SWE)	14:35.8
Women's sprint	Maja Alm (DEN)	13:55.5	Natalia Gemperle (RUS)	14:32.5	Galina Vinogradova (RUS)	14:34.2
Sprint relay	Sweden (SWE): Lina Strand; Jerker Lysell; Jonas Leandersson; Helena Jansson	1:03:32	Denmark (DEN): Cecilie Friberg Klysner; Andreas Hougaard Boesen; Tue Lassen; Maja Alm	1:04:02	Switzerland (SUI): Elena Roos; Florian Howald; Martin Hubmann; Sabine Hauswirth	1:04.26
Men's middle distance	Thierry Gueorgiou (FRA)	33:12	Fabian Hertner (SUI)	33:37	Oleksandr Kratov (UKR)	33:42
Women's middle distance	Tove Alexandersson (SWE)	32:34	Marianne Andersen (NOR)	34:44	Venla Harju (FIN)	36:44
Men's long distance	Olav Lundanes (NOR)	1:45:25	Leonid Novikov (RUS)	1:47:15	William Lind (SWE)	1:47:38
Women's long distance	Tove Alexandersson (SWE)	1:19:10	Maja Alm (DEN)	1:20:42	Natalia Gemperle (RUS)	1:24:46
Men's relay	Norway (NOR): Eskil Kinneberg; Olav Lundanes; Magne Dæhli	1:34:50	France (FRA): Frederic Tranchand; Lucas Basset; Thierry Gueorgiou	1:36:06	Sweden (SWE): Johan Runesson; William Lind; Gustav Bergman	1:36:53
Women's relay	Sweden (SWE): Emma Johansson; Helena Jansson; Tove Alexandersson	1:41:12	Russia (RUS): Anastasia Rudnaya; Svetlana Mironova; Natalia Gemperle	1:43:53	Finland (FIN): Venla Harju; Marika Teini; Merja Rantanen	1:45:35

== Medal summary ==
=== Medal table ===
Rank	Nation	Gold	Silver	Bronze	Total
1	Sweden (SWE)	4	0	3	7
2	Norway (NOR)	2	1	0	3
3	Denmark (DEN)	1	2	0	3
3	France (FRA)	1	2	0	3
5	Switzerland (SUI)	1	1	1	3
6	Russia (RUS)	0	3	2	5
7	Finland (FIN)	0	0	2	2
8	Ukraine (UKR)	0	0	1	1
Totals (8 entries)		9	9	9	27
