= IFK Göteborg (sports club) =

Sports club in Gothenburg, Sweden

- Full name: Idrottsföreningen Kamraterna Göteborg
- Founded: 4 October 1904, Gothenburg
- Based in: Gothenburg, Sweden
- Colours: Blue, White

Idrottsföreningen Kamraterna Göteborg, commonly known as IFK Göteborg, is a Swedish multisports club located in Gothenburg. It was established on 4 October 1904, and today functions as an alliance association (Swedish: Alliansförening) for seven separate clubs competing in different sports. The club is best known for its professional football team, one of the most successful in the Nordic countries.

== History ==
IFK Göteborg was founded on 4 October 1904 as the second iteration of an Idrottsföreningen Kamraterna association in Gothenburg, the previous start-up in 1895 did not live for long. While most members focused on football from the start in 1904, committees were also created for winter sports and parties. The club was founded at Café Olivedal, a café in the Linnéstaden district, and most sports activities at the start were held on nearby Karlsrofältet or in the area that today is the Gothenburg Botanical Garden. From its inception until 31 December 2017, all sections were part of the same organisation. Starting on 1 January 2018, all sections became separate organisations, under a new parent, or alliance, organisation named IFK Göteborg. The previous organisation number was taken over by the football organisation, which was renamed IFK Göteborg Fotboll.

== Member clubs ==
The following clubs are members of the alliance association and also members of the IFK central organisation as of 2025:

Member club name	Sports	Members
IFK Göteborg Bowling Dam	Bowling	11 (Note: Reported in 2024.)
IFK Göteborg Bowling Herr	Bowling	27 (Note: Reported in 2022.)
IFK Göteborg Fotboll	Football	7,180
IFK Göteborg Friidrott	Athletics	350
IFK Göteborg Futsal	Futsal	64
IFK Göteborg Orientering	Orienteering; Cross-country skiing	530
IFK Göteborg Skridskoförening	Speed skating	20

== Current sports ==
=== Athletics ===
Athletics has been present within IFK Göteborg since the start, and the first footballers also were successful athletes. The section won its first Olympic medal through Charles Luther at the 1912 Summer Olympics. Long-distance runner Eric Backman, with four Olympic medals at the 1920 Summer Olympics, also competed for IFK Göteborg. IFK was the best club overall at the 1957 Swedish Championships in athletics, and the period from 1985 to 1995 was one of the most successful in terms of medals won, including hurdler Robert Kronberg who competed for IFK Göteborg in his youth years. The main focus of the section since 2000 has been youth development, with the section operating mainly at Slottsskogsvallen and Friidrottens Hus in western Gothenburg.

=== Bowling ===
The bowling section traces its origins back to the 29 August 1917, when Kägelklubben IFK was founded by members of IFK Göteborg. This club was incorporated as a section of IFK Göteborg in 1931, though 1938 is also claimed as the starting year. The IFK bowler Gösta Algeskog won two gold medals (individual and 8-man team) at the first World Tenpin Bowling Championships in 1954, silver the following year, and another gold in the 8-man discipline in 1958. The most successful female Swedish bowler of all time, Åsa Larsson, represented IFK from 1987 to 2002, winning the World Tenpin Bowling Championships in 1983 (5-man team) and the World Cup in 1991, in addition to a number of gold medals at the European Championships. Two bowling clubs are members of the alliance, the women's club IFK Göteborg Bowling Dam and the men's club IFK Göteborg Bowling Herr.

=== Cross-country skiing ===
The cross-country skiing section was created in 1967, and has mainly seen local success, with the best position in a Swedish championship competition being a 14th place in ski-orienteering. On district level, IFK skiers won 34 championships in the first 20 years of the section, almost half of the titles in ski-orienteering. A major goal for many of the section members is Vasaloppet, and in recent times between 10 and 15 skiers usually have competed for IFK Göteborg in the races each year. Skiing on the west coast of Sweden can be a challenge due to lack of snow, Prioritet Serneke Arena with its newly built all-season indoor skiing trail may mend the situation somewhat.

=== Football ===
The football team has won 18 Swedish championship titles, eight national cup titles, and is the only club in the Nordic countries that has won a pan-European competition, as the club won the UEFA Cup in 1982 and 1987. IFK is the most popular football club in Sweden, with diverse country-wide support. IFK Göteborg play in the highest Swedish league, Allsvenskan, where they have played for the majority of their history. They have played in the Swedish first tier continuously since 1977. The club won its first Swedish championship in 1908, and has won at least one championship title in all decades since, except the 1920s, 1970s and 2010s. IFK Göteborg's most successful period was from 1982 to 1996, when the team prospered in European football and won 10 out of 15 Swedish championships. The current home ground is Gamla Ullevi. A senior women's team was created in 2019, playing in Division 4 Göteborg for the inaugural 2020 season.

=== Futsal ===
In October 2015, futsal club Göteborg Futsal Club (founded in 2007) initiated a cooperation with IFK Göteborg, changing its name to IFK Göteborg Futsal. The club has a men's team playing in the Swedish Futsal League, claiming three championship titles as of 2016. The women's team of IFK Göteborg Futsal was playing in a regional league at the time, but has advanced through the league pyramid and won the Swedish championship in 2020. Both teams play their home matches in Prioritet Serneke Arena.

=== Orienteering ===
IFK Göteborg first competed in orienteering in 1921, and is one of Sweden's oldest orienteering clubs, but a separate section was not created until 1945. Many successful orienteers have competed for the section, including world champions (at the time they ran for IFK) Torben Skovlyst, Chris Terkelsen, Jamie Stevenson, François Gonon, and current runner Kasper Fosser, as well as individual Swedish champions Thomas Asp, Arto Rautiainen, Erik Engstrand, and Jenny Johansson. IFK Göteborg also has won the Swedish relay championships, in 2000 and 2002. IFK Göteborg has won the two most prestigious club relay competitions in the world in recent years. Tiomila in Sweden was won by the men's team in 2015, 2017, 2018 and 2019 (finishing second in 2016), and the Jukola relay in Finland was won in 2017 (which was the first victory by a Swedish club in 25 years). The women's team have finished second and third in Tiomila in recent years, and the side was further strengthened in 2022 by signing Simona Aebersold who joins world champion Sara Hagström at the club.

=== Speed skating ===
Even though the first club competition in speed skating was arranged already in January 1905, it was not until 1956 that speed skating got its own section within IFK Göteborg. Three years later the section had over 100 members and arranged the 1959 European Speed Skating Championships for Men together with IK Wega. Manne Lavås became the first olympian of the section, competing both at the 1964 and 1968 Winter Olympics. Two other well-known IFK speed skaters are Ann-Sofie Järnström and Jasmin Krohn, the later winning 38 Swedish championships for IFK Göteborg. The section has its home at Ruddalens IP's skating rink, which was rebuilt to an indoor hall in 2002.

== Former sports ==
=== Racewalking ===
A racewalking section of IFK Göteborg was active for two periods in the 20th century. First during the early years of the club until the mid-1910s when racewalking fell out of fashion, and later from 1934—when the Swedish Walking Association was founded—until the 1990s. Competitors for the club have won multiple Swedish championships and set multiple Swedish records, most notably in the 1940s and 1950s (mainly through Harry Olsson), and the late 1980s (through Bo Gustafsson who also finished seventh in the 50 kilometres race at the 1988 Olympics while competing for IFK).

=== Wrestling ===
Wrestling was practiced by members of the club from its foundation, and the first competition was held in 1905, though wrestling was only officially on the programme for the club between 1908 and 1910. Olympian Harry Larsson competed for IFK Göteborg and won a Swedish championship for the club in 1910.

=== Other ===
The club has also competed in korgboll (a predecessor to korfball), handball, weightlifting, bandy and tennis.

== Cooperations ==
IFK Göteborg cooperated with the ice hockey club BK Bäcken from 1975 on, as part of the umbrella organisation Föreningen Göteborgsidrott (handball club IK Heim was another member). BK Bäcken changed their colours to blue and white and also changed the name to IFK Bäcken in line with the agreement, but were never part of IFK Göteborg. Bäcken changed its name to Gothia HC in 1990 before changing name once again in 1994 to Bäcken HC.
