= Ane Dyrkorn =

Norwegian orienteer (born 1999)

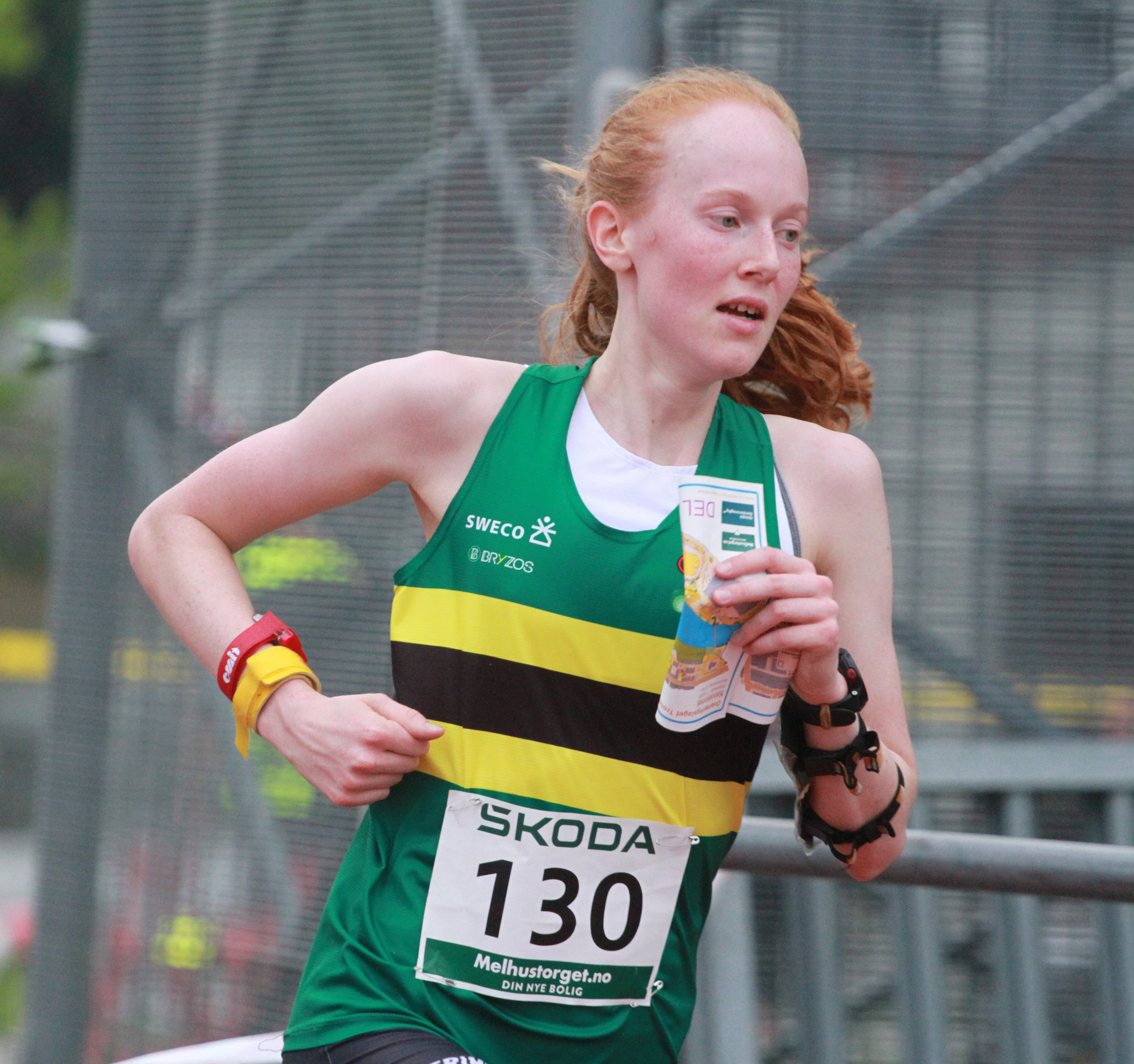

Personal information
- Born: 1999 (age 26–27)

Sport
- Sport: Orienteering
- Club: NTNUI
Medal record
Representing Norway
Women's orienteering
World Championships
| Bronze medal – third place | 2022 Denmark | Mixed sprint relay |
European Championships
| Bronze medal – third place | 2022 Rakvere | Relay |

Ane Dyrkorn (born 1999) is a Norwegian orienteering competitor who represents the club NTNUI.

== Sports career ==
=== 2022 ===
Dyrkorn won a bronze medal in the mixed sprint relay at the 2022 World Orienteering Championships. She also placed fourteenth in the sprint at the same championships.

At the 2022 European Orienteering Championships, she won a bronze medal in the relay with the Norwegian team, and placed fourth in the middle distance. She was also Norwegian champion in sprint in 2022.

=== 2023 ===
She placed fourth in the middle distance at the 2023 World Orienteering Championships.

By winning the final in the Norwegian cup in September, she also won the overall national cup in 2023.

=== 2024 ===
Competing at the 2024 World Orienteering Championships in Edinburgh, she qualified for the sprint final, where she placed 12th.

=== 2026 ===
In July 2026 she placed 6th in the individual sprint at the 2026 World Orienteering Championships in Genova.
