= Tino Polsini =

Swiss orienteer (born 1999)

Personal information
- Born: 24 May 1999 (age 27)

Sport
- Sport: Orienteering
- Club: OLV Baselland; Södertälje-Nykvarn orientering
Medal record
Representing Switzerland
Men's orienteering
World Games
Gold medal – first place	2025 Chengdu	Mixed sprint relay
World Championships
Silver medal – second place	2024 Edinburgh	Sprint

Tino Polsini (born 24 May 1999) is a Swiss orienteer who represents the Swiss club OLV Baselland and the Swedish club Södertälje-Nykvarn orientering.

He won a silver medal in the sprint at the 2024 World Orienteering Championships in Edinburgh, behind Martin Regborn, in his first ever WOC competition.

Polsini won a national title in the sprint in 2024, his first individual medal in the Swiss championships.
