= Sanna Fast =

Swedish orienteer (born 1998)

Personal information
- Born: August 1, 1998 (age 27)

Sport
- Sport: Orienteering
- Club: IFK Goteborg
Medal record
Representing Sweden
Women's orienteering
World Championships
Silver medal – second place	2025 Kuopio	Middle
Junior World Championships
Gold medal – first place	2017 Tampere	Relay
Silver medal – second place	2018 Kecskemét	Middle

Sanna Fasth (born 1 August 1998) is a Swedish orienteering competitor who competes internationally. She was awarded the silver medal in the middle distance at the 2025 World Orienteering Championships.

Fasth's hometown is Boxholm, where she grew up, competing for the local club Boxholm-Mjölby OL. She has worked towards a degree in medical studies. She joined Eksjö OK after leaving Boxholm-Mjölby, and now lives and works in Gothenburg where she competes for IFK Goteborg.
