= Lisa Risby =

Swedish orienteering competitor

Personal information
- Nationality: Swedish
- Born: 1993 (age 32–33)

Sport
- Sport: Orienteering
- Club: OK Kåre
Medal record
Representing Sweden
Women's orienteering
World Championships
Gold medal – first place	2021 Doksy	Relay
Junior World Championships
Gold medal – first place	2013 Hradec Králové	Long
Silver medal – second place	2013 Hradec Králové	Middle

Lisa Risby (born 6 July 1993) is a Swedish orienteering competitor who runs for the club OK Kåre.

She represented Sweden at the 2021 World Orienteering Championships in the Czech Republic, where she placed sixth in the middle distance. She won a gold medal in the women's relay with the Swedish team, along with Sara Hagström and Tove Alexandersson.
