= Lukas Liland =

Norwegian orienteer

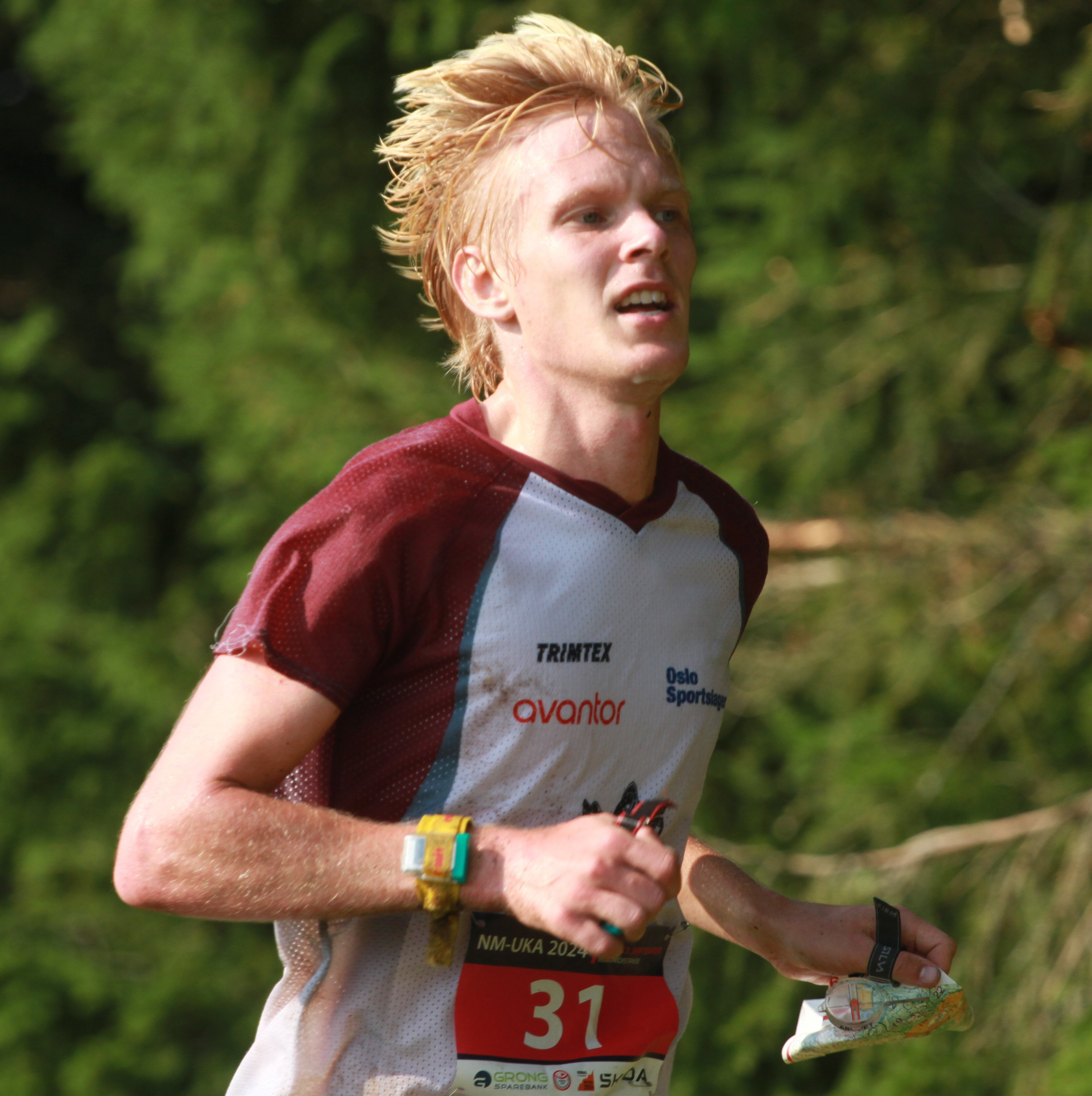

Personal information
- Born: 1999 (age 26–27)

Sport
- Sport: Orienteering
Medal record
Representing Norway
Men's orienteering
World Championships
Bronze medal – third place	2022 Triangle Region	Sprint relay

Lukas Liland (born 1999) is a Norwegian orienteering competitor.

== Career ==
At the 2022 World Orienteering Championships in Denmark, Liland won a bronze medal with the Norwegian sprint relay team. In the individual sprint, he was 28th. At the European Orienteering Championships, Liland's best achievement is 10th in the knockout sprint in Neuchâtel in 2021. This is also his best finish at the Orienteering World Cup. At the Junior World Orienteering Championships, he won the relay event with the Norwegian team and bronze in the middle distance in 2019.

In 2025, he placed eighth in the long distance at the 2025 World Orienteering Championships in Kuopio.
