= Victoria Hæstad Bjørnstad =

Norwegian orienteer (born 1999)

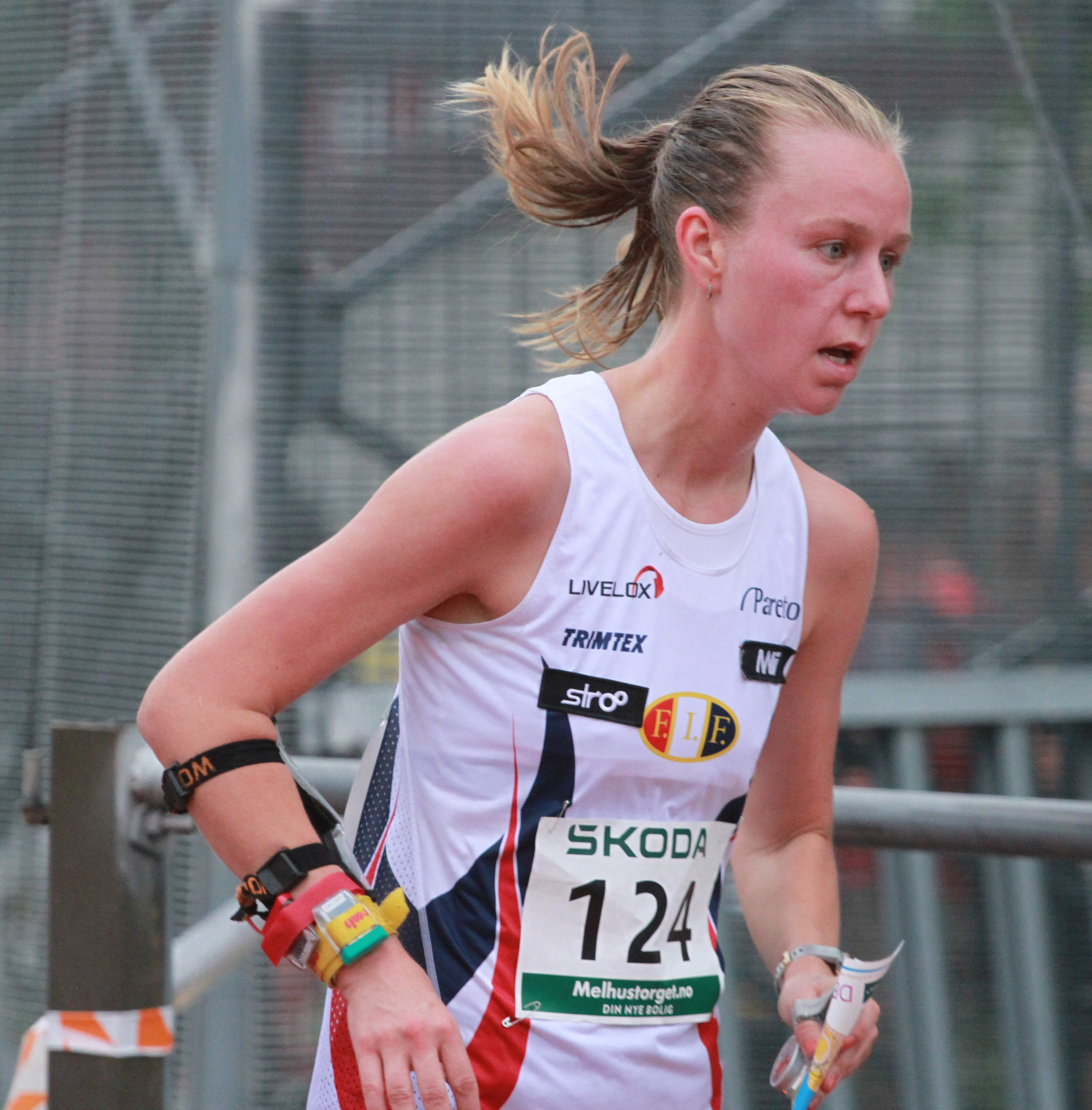

Personal information
- Born: 1999 (age 26–27)

Sport
- Sport: Orienteering
- Club: Fossum IF
Medal record
Women's orienteering
Representing Norway
World Games
Silver medal – second place	2022 Birmingham	Mixed sprint relay
World Championships
Silver medal – second place	2021 Doksy	Sprint relay
Bronze medal – third place	2024 Edinburgh	Sprint relay
European Championships
Bronze medal – third place	2021 Switzerland	Sprint relay
Junior World Championships
Bronze medal – third place	2017 Tampere	Relay
Bronze medal – third place	2018 Kecskemét	Relay

Victoria Hæstad Bjørnstad (born 1999) is a Norwegian orienteer who competes internationally, and runs for the club Fossum IF.

== Career ==
Bjørnstad represented Norway at the 2021 European Orienteering Championships, where she won a bronze medal in the Sprint relay with the Norwegian team, along with Eskil Kinneberg, Kasper Fosser and Andrine Benjaminsen. She also competed in the Knock-out sprint, where she qualified for the quarter-finals.

At the 2021 World Orienteering Championships in the Czech Republic, she won a silver medal in the mixed sprint relay with the Norwegian team, along with Audun Heimdal, Kasper Fosser and Andrine Benjaminsen.

At the 2024 World Orienteering Championships in Edinburgh she was running first leg for Norway in the mixed sprint relay, were the Norwegian team won bronze medals.

At the European Orienteering Championships in Belgium in August 2025, Bjørnstad won a gold medal in the mixed sprint relay with the Norwegian team, along with Eirik Langedal Breivik, Kasper Fosser, and Andrine Benjaminsen.

She won a bronze medal in the mixed sprint relay at the 2026 World Orienteering Championships in Genova, along with Eirik Langedal Breivik, Kasper Fosser, and Pia Young Vik.
