= Gustav Bergman (orienteer) =

Swedish orienteer (born 1990)

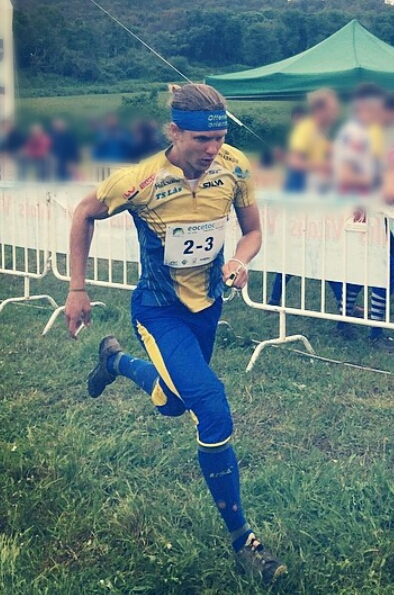
- Gustav Bergman in 2014

Personal information
- Born: 4 December 1990 (age 35) Stockholm, Sweden

Sport
- Sport: Orienteering
Medal record
Men's orienteering
Representing Sweden
World Championships
| Gold medal – first place | 2014 Trentino | Relay |
| Gold medal – first place | 2019 Østfold | Relay |
| Gold medal – first place | 2021 Doksy | Sprint Relay |
| Gold medal – first place | 2021 Doksy | Relay |
| Gold medal – first place | 2022 Triangle Region | Sprint Relay |
| Silver medal – second place | 2013 Vuokatti | Relay |
| Silver medal – second place | 2019 Østfold | Middle |
| Silver medal – second place | 2021 Doksy | Middle |
| Silver medal – second place | 2022 Triangle Region | Sprint |
| Bronze medal – third place | 2013 Vuokatti | Middle |
| Bronze medal – third place | 2016 Strömstad | Relay |
| Bronze medal – third place | 2016 Strömstad | Mixed sprint relay |
| Bronze medal – third place | 2017 Tartu | Relay |
| Bronze medal – third place | 2023 Flims Laax | Relay |
World Cup
| Gold medal – first place | 2019 | WC Overall |
| Bronze medal – third place | 2022 | WC Overall |
| Bronze medal – third place | 2023 | WC Overall |
European Championships
| Gold medal – first place | 2014 Palmela | Relay |
| Silver medal – second place | 2016 Jesenik | Middle |
| Silver medal – second place | 2016 Jesenik | Sprint |
| Silver medal – second place | 2022 Rakvere | Relay |
| Bronze medal – third place | 2021 Neuchâtel | Sprint |
| Bronze medal – third place | 2022 Rakvere | Middle |
Junior World Championships
| Gold medal – first place | 2009 Primiero | Relay |
| Gold medal – first place | 2009 Primiero | Long |
| Silver medal – second place | 2010 Aalborg | Relay |

Gustav Bergman (born 4 December 1990) is a Swedish orienteering competitor. Bergman has won five gold medals for Sweden in relay events at the World Orienteering Championships, and four medals in individual events.

== Career ==
At the Junior World Orienteering Championships, Bergman won two gold medals in 2009 in the Relay and the Long at the championships in Italy and a silver medal in the Relay with Sweden in 2010 before becoming part of the Swedish senior squad. After a disappointing year in 2011 (his first year as a senior), in which Bergman was not selected for the Swedish national team, in 2012 Bergman made his breakthrough to the senior team and came 5th at the European Orienteering Championships in his first senior appearance for Sweden.

In 2013, Bergman won a bronze medal in the middle distance at the 2013 World Orienteering Championships. In 2014, Bergman was one of the favourites to win the World Championships Middle Distance in Vuokatti, Finland, but finished in a disappointing 9th place; following this, Bergman had one of the best performances of his career in the Relay event, in which he ran away from seasoned orienteering stars Thierry Gueorgiou and Matthias Kyburz to win the relay for Sweden- his first gold medal at the World Championships. Following this, Bergman became a fixture in the Swedish orienteering relay team. At the 2014 European Orienteering Championships, Bergman won a gold medal in the relay with Sweden as well. As of 2024, this was his only gold medal at the European Championships.

At the 2016 World Orienteering Championships in Strömstad he won a bronze medal in relay with the Swedish team, along with Fredrik Bakkman and William Lind, as well as a bronze medal in the mixed sprint relay. He repeated the bronze medal in the relay the following year at the World Championships.

At the 2019 World Orienteering Championships in Østfold he won a silver medal at the middle distance and a gold medal in the relay with the Swedish team, along with Johan Runesson and Emil Svensk. Bergman won the 2019 Orienteering World Cup, becoming the first orienteer apart from Daniel Hubmann or Matthias Kyburz to win since 2007. Bergman had another successful season in 2021, winning two gold medals in the relay events and a silver medal in the Middle Distance at the 2021 World Orienteering Championships. In 2022, Bergman won a surprise silver medal in the Sprint at the 2022 World Orienteering Championships, a discipline in which he had not competed at the World Championships since 2013.

At the 2023 World Orienteering Championships in Flims-Laax he won a bronze medal as a member of the Swedish team in the relay along with Albin Ridefeldt and Emil Svensk.

Competing at the 2024 World Orienteering Championships in Edinburgh, he placed fourth in the sprint final, two seconds behind bronze winner Emil Svensk.

== Results ==
=== World Championship results ===
Year
| Year | Age | Long | Middle | Sprint | Relay | Sprint; Relay |
| 2012 | 21 | — | 8 | — | — | —N/a |
| 2013 | 22 | — | 3 | 17 | 2 | —N/a |
| 2014 | 23 | — | 9 | — | 1 | — |
| 2015 | 24 | 8 | 17 | — | 7 | — |
| 2016 | 25 | 23 | 7 | — | 3 | 3 |
| 2017 | 26 | — | 6 | — | 3 | — |
| 2018 | 27 | 5 | 10 | — | 9 | — |
| 2019 | 28 | 12 | 2 | —N/a | 1 | —N/a |
| 2021 | 30 | DSQ | 2 | —N/a | 1 | 1 |
| 2022 | 31 | —N/a | —N/a | 2 | —N/a | 1 |
| 2023 | 32 | —N/a | 5 | —N/a | 3 | —N/a |
| 2024 | 33 | —N/a | —N/a | 4 | —N/a | |

=== World Cup victories ===
| No. | Date | Venue | Distance |
|---|---|---|---|
| 1 | 31 August 2018 | (Norway) Aremark | Long distance |
| 2 | 8 June 2019 | (Finland) Helsinki | Middle distance |
| 3 | 9 June 2019 | (Finland) Helsinki | Pursuit |
| 4 | 26 October 2019 | (China) Guangzhou | Middle distance |

== Personal life ==
He was born in Stockholm, represents OK Ravinen, and is married to Helena Bergman. Bergman lives in Bagarmossen.
