= Andrine Benjaminsen =

Norwegian orienteer (born 1995)

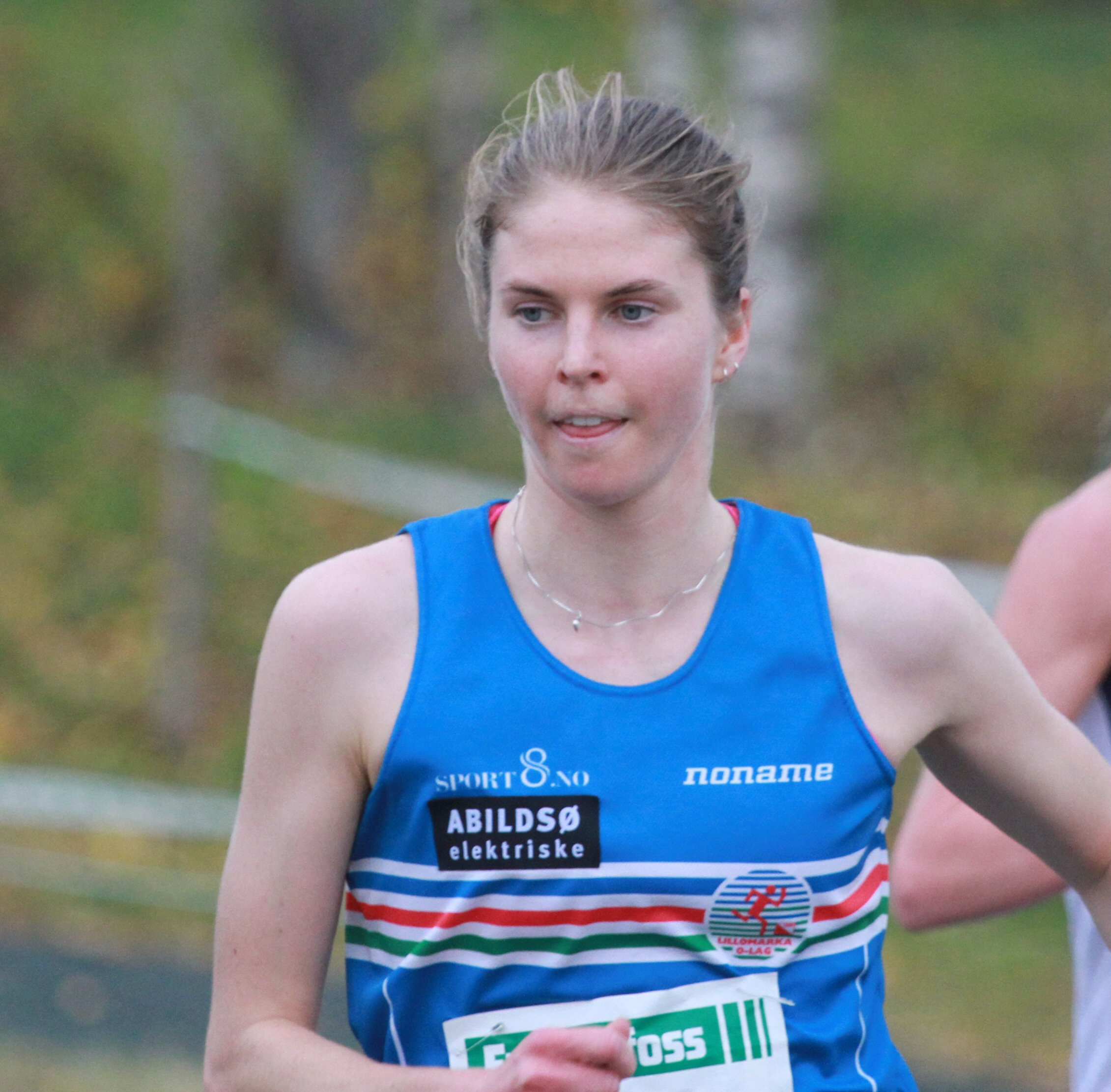

Personal information
- Born: 23 August 1995 (age 30)

Sport
- Sport: Orienteering; Ski orienteering
- Club: Lillomarka OL
Medal record
Representing Norway
Women's orienteering
World Championships
Silver medal – second place	2021 Doksy	Mixed sprint relay
Silver medal – second place	2021 Doksy	Middle
Silver medal – second place	2025 Kuopio	Relay
Bronze medal – third place	2021 Doksy	Relay
Bronze medal – third place	2022 Denmark	Mixed sprint relay
Bronze medal – third place	2023 Grisons	Long
Bronze medal – third place	2023 Grisons	Relay
Bronze medal – third place	2024 Edinburgh	Mixed sprint relay
Bronze medal – third place	2025 Kuopio	Long
European Championships
Gold medal – first place	2025 Hasselt	Mixed sprint relay
Silver medal – second place	2024 Mór	Relay
Bronze medal – third place	2024 Mór	Long
Bronze medal – third place	2024 Mór	Middle
Bronze medal – third place	2018 Switzerland	Mixed sprint relay
Bronze medal – third place	2021 Switzerland	Knock-out sprint
Bronze medal – third place	2021 Switzerland	Mixed sprint relay
Bronze medal – third place	2022 Rakvere	Relay
Women's ski-orienteering
Junior World Championships
Bronze medal – third place	2013 Madona	Sprint
Bronze medal – third place	2015 Hamar/Løten	Sprint

Andrine Benjaminsen (born 23 August 1995) is a Norwegian orienteer and ski orienteer.

Her achievements in ski orienteering include winning two bronze medals in the Junior World Championships. In foot orienteering, she has won medals at the World Orienteering Championships and the European Orienteering Championships, both in the individual competitions, and with relay teams for Norway.

== Career ==
=== Junior career ===
As a junior, Benjaminsen excelled in ski orienteering, and she won a bronze medal at the 2013 and 2015 Junior World Ski Orienteering Championships.

In foot orienteering, Benjaminsen represented Norway at the 2017 World Orienteering Championships in Tartu, Estonia, where her best result was ninth place in the long distance.

=== 2021 ===
At the 2021 European Orienteering Championships she won a bronze medal in the Knock-out sprint, and a bronze medal in the Sprint relay with the Norwegian team.

At the 2021 World Orienteering Championships in the Czech Republic, she placed 10th in the sprint. She won a silver medal in the mixed sprint relay with the Norwegian team, after a close fight with Swiss Elena Roos on the last leg. She also won a silver medal in the middle distance, behind winner Tove Alexandersson, and a bronze medal in the relay with the Norwegian team, along with Kamilla Steiwer and Marie Olaussen.

=== 2022 ===
In 2022, Benjaminsen won a bronze medal in the mixed sprint relay at the 2022 World Orienteering Championships. She also placed fourth in the sprint at the same championships. At the 2022 European Orienteering Championships, she won a bronze medal in the relay with the Norwegian team.

=== 2023 ===
She won a bronze medal in the long distance at the 2023 World Orienteering Championships. She also won a bronze medal in the relay with the Norwegian team, and placed fifth in the middle distance.

=== 2024 ===
In May 2024 Benjaminsen won a national title in knockout sprint, which earned her the Kongepokal trophy.

Competing at the 2024 World Orienteering Championships in Edinburgh in July 2024, she qualified for the sprint final, where she placed 23rd. Two days later Benjaminsen ran the last leg for Norway in the mixed sprint relay. The Norwegian team, which also included Victoria Hæstad Bjørnstad, Eirik Langedal Breivik and Kasper Fosser, won bronze medals in the relay.

She won a bronze medal in the middle distance at the 2024 European Orienteering Championships in Hungary, behind Simona Aebersold and Natalia Gemperle. The next day she won another bronze medal in the long distance at the championships, behind winner Tove Alexandersson and silver medalist Simona Aebersold. Benjaminsen was running the last leg in the relay at the 2024 European Championships, winning silver medal for Norway along with Kamilla Steiwer and Marie Olaussen.

=== 2025 ===
In 2025, Benjaminsen was awarded the Bronze medal in the long distance at the 2025 World Orienteering Championships behind Simona Aebersold and Tove Alexandersson. She won a silver medal in the relay with the Norwegian team, along with Pia Young Vik and Marie Olaussen. She was running the last leg of the relay, and Norway finally placed second behind Sweden, ahead of the Swiss team.

At the European Orienteering Championships in Belgium in August 2025, Benjaminsen won a gold medal in the mixed sprint relay with the Norwegian team, along with Victoria Hæstad Bjørnstad, Eirik Langedal Breivik, and Kasper Fosser.

== Personal life ==
Benjaminsen's parents are Finnish orienteer Anne Benjaminsen and Norwegian orienteer Vidar Benjaminsen. Figure skater Juni Marie Benjaminsen is her sister.
