= Simona Aebersold =

Swiss orienteering competitor

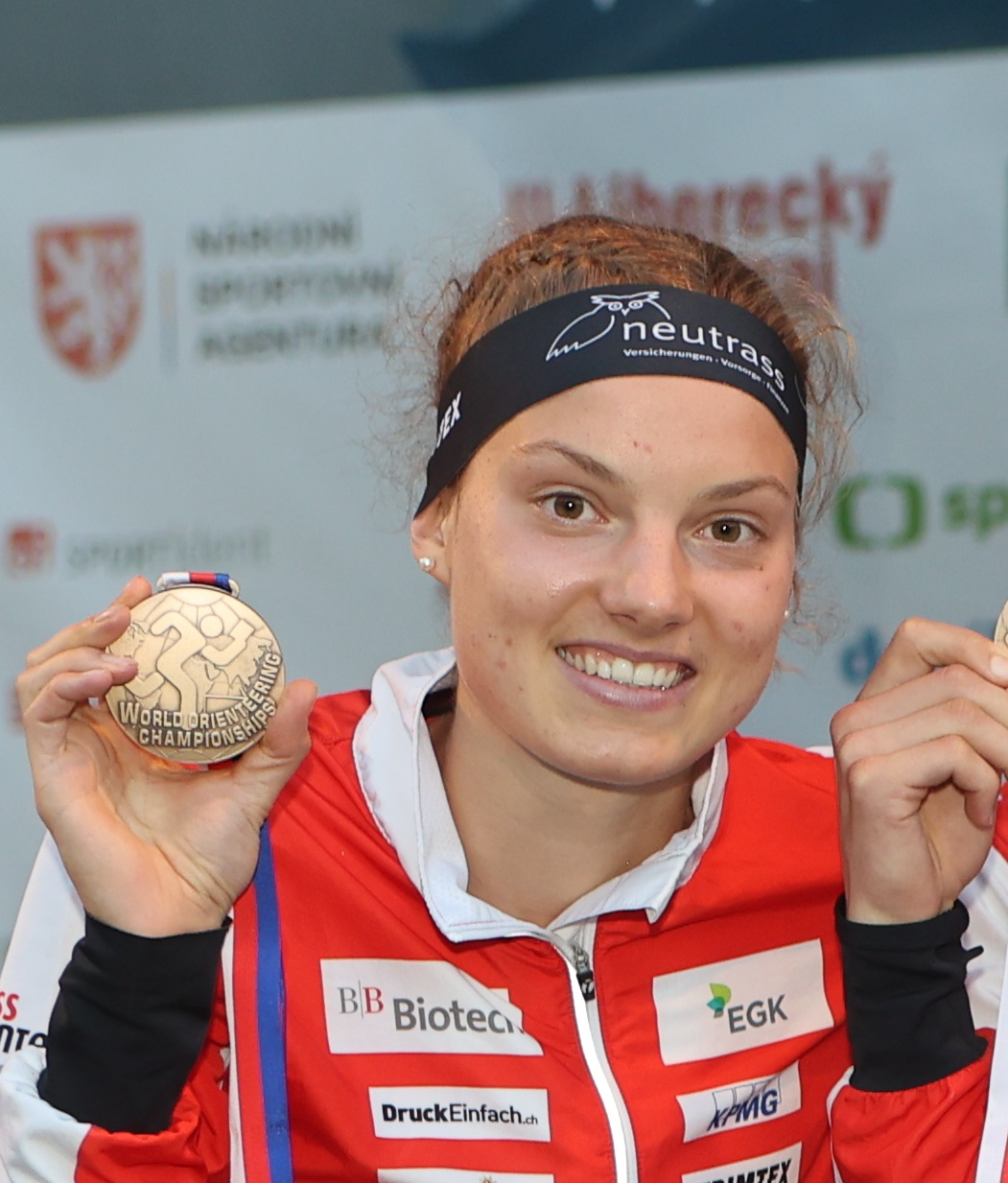
- Aebersold in 2021

Personal information
- Nationality: Swiss
- Born: April 13, 1998 (age 28) Bern, Switzerland

Sport
- Sport: Orienteering
- Club: IFK Göteborg
Medal record
Women's orienteering
World Championships
Gold medal – first place	2025 Kuopio	Long
Gold medal – first place	2024 Edinburgh	Sprint relay
Gold medal – first place	2023 Grisons	Long
Silver medal – second place	2024 Edinburgh	Sprint
Silver medal – second place	2023 Grisons	Relay
Silver medal – second place	2022 Triangle Region	Sprint
Silver medal – second place	2021 Doksy	Relay
Silver medal – second place	2019 Østfold	Middle
Silver medal – second place	2019 Østfold	Relay
Bronze medal – third place	2024 Edinburgh	Knock out sprint
Bronze medal – third place	2021 Doksy	Sprint Relay
Bronze medal – third place	2021 Doksy	Middle
Bronze medal – third place	2021 Doksy	Long
Bronze medal – third place	2019 Østfold	Long
World Cup
Gold medal – first place	2025	WC Overall
Gold medal – first place	2024	WC Overall
Silver medal – second place	2022	WC Overall
Silver medal – second place	2021	WC Overall
Silver medal – second place	2019	WC Overall
World Games
Gold medal – first place	2022 Birmingham	Sprint
Gold medal – first place	2022 Birmingham	Middle
Gold medal – first place	2022 Birmingham	Mixed sprint relay
Gold medal – first place	2025 Chengdu	Sprint
Gold medal – first place	2025 Chengdu	Middle
Gold medal – first place	2025 Chengdu	Mixed sprint relay
European Championships
Gold medal – first place	2021 Neuchâtel	Sprint Relay
Silver medal – second place	2021 Neuchâtel	Knock-out sprint
Bronze medal – third place	2021 Neuchâtel	Sprint
Bronze medal – third place	2018 Ticino	Middle
Junior World Championships
Gold medal – first place	2018 Kecskemét	Long
Gold medal – first place	2018 Kecskemét	Sprint
Gold medal – first place	2017 Tampere	Sprint
Gold medal – first place	2017 Tampere	Middle
Gold medal – first place	2017 Tampere	Long
Gold medal – first place	2016 Engadin	Sprint
Gold medal – first place	2016 Engadin	Middle
Gold medal – first place	2016 Engadin	Relay
Gold medal – first place	2015 Rauland	Sprint
Silver medal – second place	2017 Tampere	Relay
Silver medal – second place	2015 Rauland	Relay

Simona Aebersold (born 13 April 1998) is a Swiss orienteering competitor. She is the daughter of Christian Aebersold, who won the World Orienteering Championships 3 times.

== Career ==
Aebersold dominated the Junior World Championships between 2015 and 2018, achieving her first gold medal at the age of 17 in the Sprint distance. She won every Junior World sprint event for the next four years, as well as medalling in three relay events, with two silvers and one gold.

In 2017, Aebersold won all 3 individual golds and a further medal in the relay, matching the feat achieved the same year by Finnish runner Olli Ojanaho in the men's class.

At the start of 2018, Aebersold won her first medal at a senior level in the European Championships, despite still being a junior and eligible to compete at the Junior World Championships. She won the Bronze in the Middle behind Swedish world champion Tove Alexandersson and Marika Teini from Finland.

In 2019, at her first World Orienteering Championships appearance, Aebersold won the bronze medal in the long distance after Alexandersson and Lina Strand. She also won second place in the middle-distance race, 5 seconds behind Alexandersson.

In 2021, Aebersold came second in the World Cup, the same position she attained in 2019. On the last race, a middle-distance event in Cansiglio, Italy, she came second behind Alexandersson by only 23 seconds- a win would have guaranteed Aebersold the overall World Cup title, with her score only being 25 points behind Alexandersson at the end of the season.

Aebersold signed for Swedish club IFK Göteborg in 2022.

Aebersold won her first gold medal in the world championships at the 2023 World Orienteering Championships in Flims ahead of Tove Alexandersson.

She won a gold medal in the middle distance at the 2024 European Orienteering Championships in Hungary, ahead of Natalia Gemperle.

In 2025, she defended her Long Distance title at the 2025 World Orienteering Championships, again defeating Tove Alexandersson, this time by just nine seconds.

In July 2026 she won the gold medal in individual sprint at the 2026 World Orienteering Championships in Genova, with a margin of one minute ahead of Pia Young Vik.
