= Magne Dæhli =

Norwegian orienteer (born 1987)

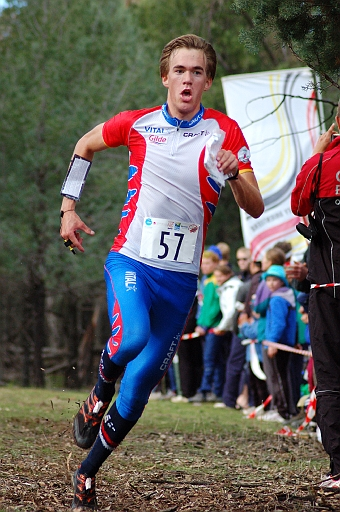
- Dæhli at JWOC 2007

Personal information
- Born: 24 April 1987 (age 39) Løten, Norway
- Father: Sigurd Dæhli

Sport
- Sport: Orienteering; Ski orienteering
- Club: Halden SK
Medal record
Men's orienteering
Representing Norway
World Championships
Gold medal – first place	2016 Strömstad	Relay
Gold medal – first place	2017 Tartu	Relay
Gold medal – first place	2018 Latvia	Relay
Silver medal – second place	2012 Lausanne	Relay
Silver medal – second place	2015 Inverness	Relay
Bronze medal – third place	2019 Østfold	Middle
European Championships
Gold medal – first place	2018 Tessin	Relay
Silver medal – second place	2016 Jesenik	Long
Silver medal – second place	2016 Jesenik	Relay
Junior World Championships
Gold medal – first place	2005 Tenero	Relay
Silver medal – second place	2007 Dubbo	Long
Silver medal – second place	2007 Dubbo	Relay
Men's ski-orienteering
Junior World Championships
Silver medal – second place	2006 Ivanovo	Relay
Bronze medal – third place	2006 Ivanovo	Middle
Bronze medal – third place	2006 Ivanovo	Long

Magne Dæhli (born 24 April 1987) is a Norwegian orienteering competitor, ski-orienteer, and cross-country skier. His achievements include five medals in the relay at the World Orienteering Championships, of which three are gold medals. His best individual performances include a silver medal in the long distance from the European Orienteering Championships, and a bronze medal in the middle distance from the 2019 World Orienteering Championships.

== Junior career ==
Dæhli competed at the 2005 Junior World Orienteering Championships in Tenero, where he received a gold medal in the relay event. He won two silver medals in the 2007 junior world championships, in the long distance and in the relay. He competed at the 2005 Junior World Ski Orienteering Championships, where he placed seventh in the sprint, ninth in the middle distance, and fourth in the relay. At the 2006 Junior World Ski Orienteering Championships, he won a bronze medal in the middle distance, a bronze medal in the long distance, placed sixth in the sprint, and won a silver medal in the relay with the Norwegian team.

== Senior career ==
Dæhli competed for Norway at the 2012 World Orienteering Championships. In the middle distance he qualified for the final, where he placed seventh, 1:23 minutes behind winner Edgars Bertuks. He was part of the Norwegian team that placed second in the relay at the 2012 World Championships, along with Carl Waaler Kaas and Olav Lundanes. He placed 20th overall in the Orienteering World Cup in 2012. At the 2013 World Orienteering Championships he placed fifth in the long distance, and sixth in the relay with the Norwegian team. In 2013 he placed 17th overall in the World Cup. He competed in the 2014 World Orienteering Championships in Italy, where he placed 11th in the long course. In 2014 he placed 10th overall in the World Cup. He achieved a silver medal in the relay in the 2015 World Orienteering Championships in Inverness, where he also placed fourth in the middle distance, and 13th in the long distance. In 2015 he placed fifth overall in the World Cup. He was part of the winning team in the relay at the 2016 World Orienteering Championships in Strömstad, where he also placed sixth in the middle and sixth in the long distance. In 2016 he placed seventh overall in the World Cup. At the 2017 World Orienteering Championships in Tartu he won a gold medal in the relay for the second time, and placed fourth in the long and ninth in the middle distance.

In 2018, Dæhli won a gold medal in the relay at the European Orienteering Championships in Switzerland. Dæhli won the overall O-Ringen in Sweden in 2018. He won a gold medal in the relay at the 2018 World Orienteering Championships in Latvia, together with Gaute Hallan Steiwer and Eskil Kinneberg. Dæhli was running the last leg of the world championship relay, winning the race with a few seconds margin ahead of Switzerland and France. This was the third consecutive World Championships gold medal for Dæhlie in the men's relay, being part of the winning Norwegian relay team in 2016, 2017 and 2018. He placed seventh in the long distance at the 2018 World Championships. At the 2019 World Orienteering Championships in Østfold, he won a bronze medal in the middle distance, placed sixth in the long distance, and was running the last leg in the relay, where the Norwegian team placed fifth.

== Personal life ==
Dæhli was born in Løten, and is son of orienteer and ski-orienteer Sigurd Dæhli.
