= Natalia Gemperle =

Swiss orienteering competitor

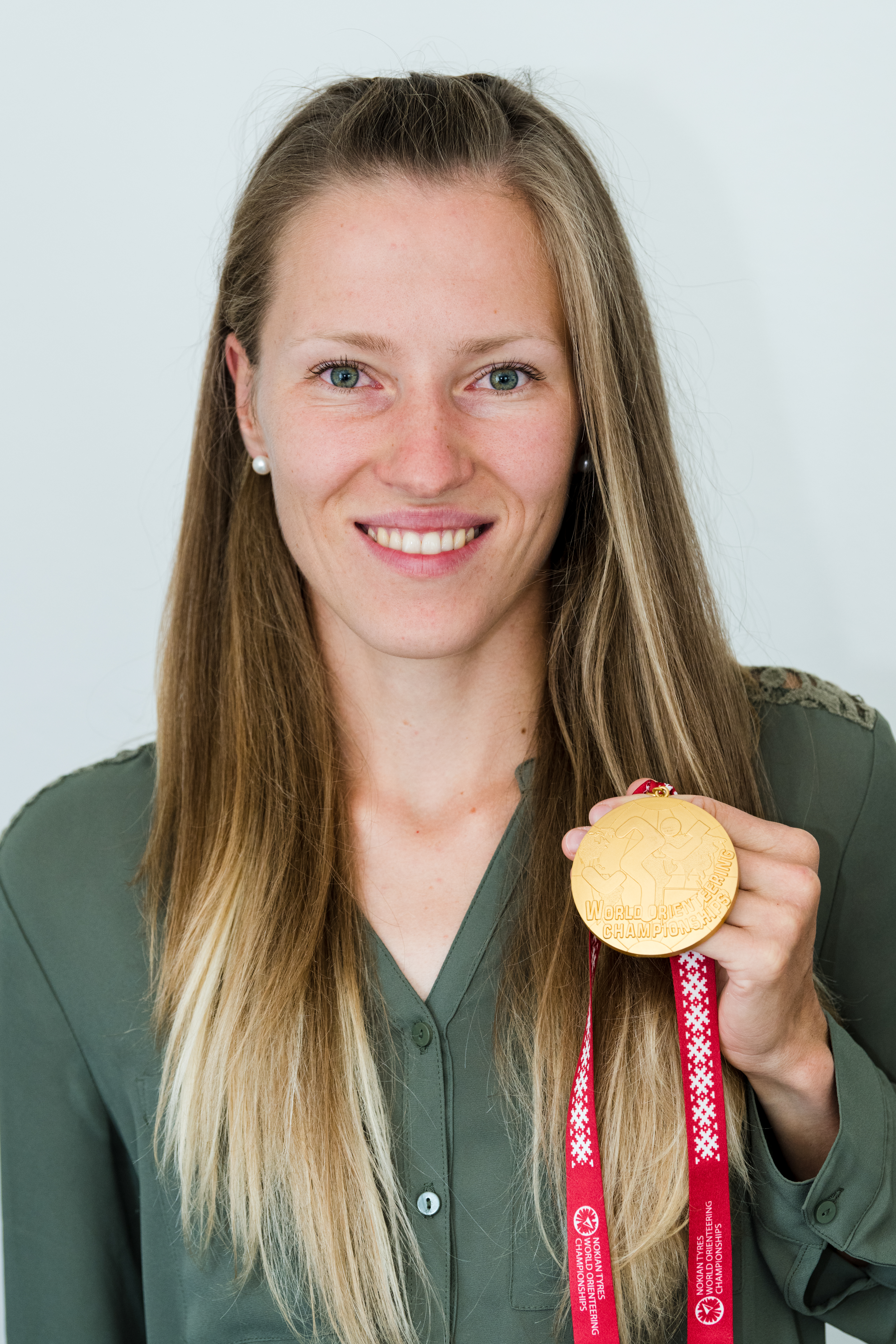
- Gemperle with a gold medal in 2018

Personal information
- Born: 9 December 1990 (age 35) Moscow, Russian SFSR, Soviet Union

Sport
- Sport: Foot orienteering
Medal record
Women's orienteering
Representing Switzerland
World Games
Gold medal – first place	2025 Chengdu	Mixed sprint relay
Silver medal – second place	2025 Chengdu	Sprint
World Championships
Gold medal – first place	2024 Edinburgh	Sprint relay
Silver medal – second place	2023 Graubünden	Middle
Silver medal – second place	2023 Graubünden	Relay
Bronze medal – third place	2024 Edinburgh	Sprint
Representing Neutral athletes
World Championships
Silver medal – second place	2021 Doksy	Long
Silver medal – second place	2021 Doksy	Sprint
Representing Russia
World Championships
Gold medal – first place	2016 Strömstad	Relay
Gold medal – first place	2018 Riga	Middle
Silver medal – second place	2016 Strömstad	Long
Silver medal – second place	2017 Tartu	Sprint
Silver medal – second place	2017 Tartu	Relay
Bronze medal – third place	2016 Strömstad	Middle
Bronze medal – third place	2017 Tartu	Long
Bronze medal – third place	2018 Riga	Relay
Bronze medal – third place	2019 Østfold	Middle
Bronze medal – third place	2019 Østfold	Relay
European Championships
Silver medal – second place	2018 Ticino	Long
Bronze medal – third place	2018 Ticino	Sprint
World Games
Silver medal – second place	2017 Wrocław	Middle
Bronze medal – third place	2017 Wrocław	Mixed relay

Natalia Mikhailovna Gemperle (Russian: Наталья Михайловна Гемперле, née Vinogradova, born 9 December 1990) is a Russian-born Swiss orienteering competitor. She competes for the clubs Alfta-Ösa and OLK Aargus

== Early life ==
Natalia Mikhailovna Vinogradova was born and raised in Moscow. At the time of her birth, Moscow was still the capital of the Soviet Union. According to Gemperle, she started orienteering with her twin sister Olga at the age of ten. At the age of 17, Gemperle was told by a professional orienteering coach after an hour observing her, that she would become a top 5 world athlete within 3 years. This prediction was eerily accurate, as Gemperle came fifth at the 2011 World Orienteering Championships 3 years later in her first year as a senior orienteer.

Gemperle won a bronze medal in her last year of eligibility at the 2010 Junior World Orienteering Championships in Denmark. This was in the relay, running with Anastasia Tikhonova and Anastasia Trubkina.

== Career ==
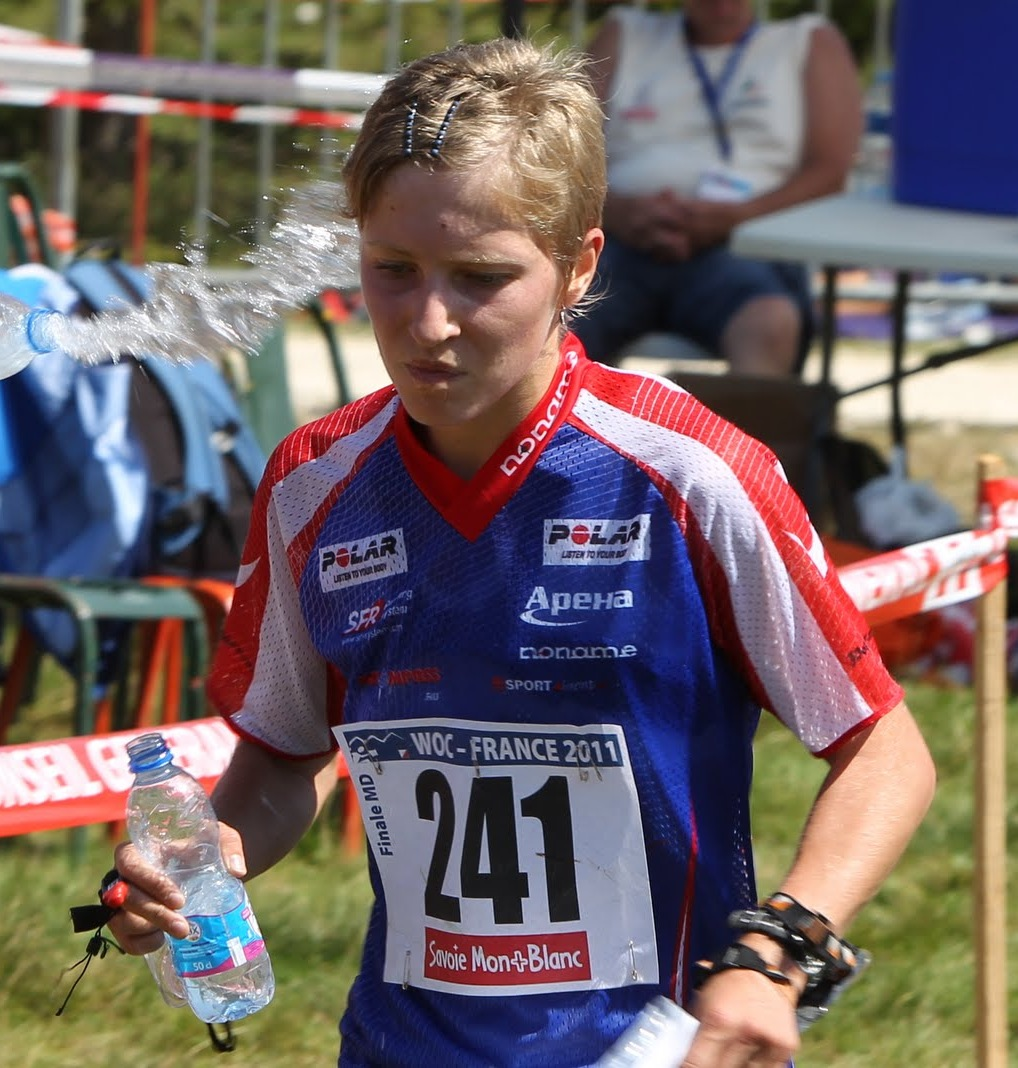
Gemperle competing in the Middle Distance at the 2011 World Orienteering Championships, held in Savoie, France.

In her first year as a senior in 2011, Gemperle came fifth at the World Orienteering Championships in the middle distance. Following this, Gemperle struggled to reach this level of performance for the next four years, matching her fifth place in the long distance at the 2015 World Orienteering Championships. Gemperle turned professional in 2015.

2016 was Gemperle's breakthrough season. At the 2016 World Orienteering Championships in Strömstad she won a silver medal in the long distance, a bronze medal in the middle distance, and a gold medal with the Russian relay team. Gemperle became a consistent performer following this season, winning medals in the World Championships every season from 2016 to 2019. Gemperle participated in the 2017 World Games in Wrocław, Poland, winning a silver at the middle-distance race and a bronze medal in the mixed relay.

Gemperle's best performance came in the 2018 World Orienteering Championships, where she won her first individual gold medal in the middle distance after favourite Tove Alexandersson was disqualified.

=== Conversion from Russia to Switzerland ===
In 2016, Gemperle married Swiss orienteering coach Rolf Gemperle, previously the head coach of the Austrian national team. Gemperle credits Rolf with improving her orienteering to the level required to compete for medals. Following her marriage, Gemperle moved to Hallwil in Switzerland. Following the commencement of the Russian Invasion of Ukraine, on 28 February 2022, the IOC banned Russia and Belarus and recommended that other international sporting organizers do the same, leading to the International Orienteering Federation banning athletes from those countries.

Gemperle became eligible for Swiss citizenship in 2022, which according to World Athletics was granted before 11 January 2022, and received her passport in March 2022. However, Gemperle was unable to compete for Switzerland in Orienteering until 2023 due to IOF rules stating runners can only compete for one country in a calendar year (Gemperle competed for Russia in a World Ranking Event in Turkey in early 2022.) Gemperle was planning to make the change to Switzerland already before the Russian invasion of Ukraine.

Despite being banned from Orienteering, Gemperle was still able to compete for Switzerland in athletics during 2022, where she came 7th at the European championships in the Mountain Running Up & Down Senior Race.

=== Competing for Switzerland ===
Gemperle made her debut for Switzerland in 2023. In her first year of eligibility, Gemperle won a silver medal in the middle distance at the World Orienteering Championships held in Switzerland, and was also part of the Swiss relay team winning the silver medals. She won her first gold medal for Switzerland with the Swiss sprint relay team in the 2024 World Orienteering Championships.

She won a silver medal in the middle distance at the 2024 European Orienteering Championships in Hungary, behind Simona Aebersold.

== Personal life ==
Gemperle has a twin named Olga. In 2020, Gemperle gave birth to a daughter. Gemperle's husband has a previous child from an earlier marriage, Eline Gemperle (born 2000), who also competes for Switzerland at an international level.
