= Emil Svensk =

Swedish orienteer (born 1993)

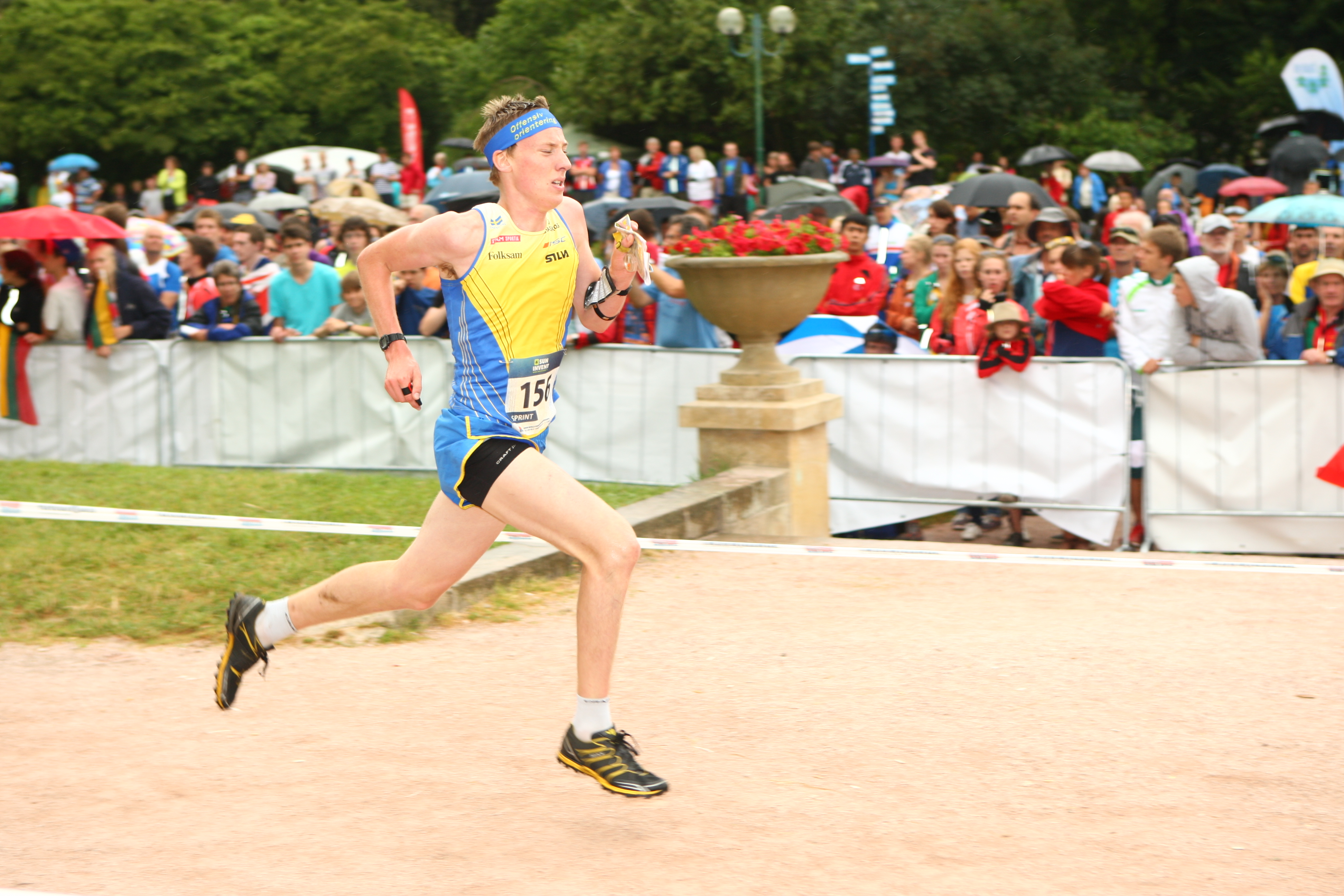
- Svensk in 2013

Personal information
- Born: 12 July 1993 (age 32) Borlänge, Sweden

Sport
- Sport: Orienteering
- Club: Stora Tuna OK
Medal record
Men's orienteering
Representing Sweden
World Championships
Gold medal – first place	2018 Riga	Mixed sprint relay
Gold medal – first place	2019 Østfold	Relay
Gold medal – first place	2021 Doksy	Mixed sprint relay
Bronze medal – third place	2023 Flims-Laax	Relay
Bronze medal – third place	2024 Edinburgh	Sprint
European Championships
Gold medal – first place	2021 Neuchâtel	Sprint
Silver medal – second place	2018 Cadempino	Mixed sprint relay
Silver medal – second place	2024 Mór	Relay
Junior World Championships
Gold medal – first place	2013 Czech Republic	Middle
Silver medal – second place	2013 Czech Republic	Relay

Emil Svensk (born 12 July 1993) is a Swedish orienteering competitor. His achievements include winning gold medals both in the World Orienteering Championships and the European Orienteering Championships.

== Sports career ==
=== Junior years ===
He won a gold medal in the middle distance at the 2013 Junior World Orienteering Championships.

=== 2017 – 2019 ===
Svensk had his senior career breakthrough at the first round of the 2017 Orienteering World Cup, where he came third in both the Sprint and the Long distance pursuit. At the 2018 European Orienteering Championships in Cadempino he won a silver medal in the mixed sprint relay with the Swedish team. He competed at the 2018 World Orienteering Championships in Latvia, where he placed sixth in the sprint final, and won a gold medal in the mixed sprint relay, together with Karolin Ohlsson, Jonas Leandersson and Tove Alexandersson. In the 2019 World Orienteering Championships in Norway he participated in the winning Swedish relay team together with Johan Runesson and Gustav Bergman.

=== 2020- ===
Due to the COVID-19 pandemic, Svensk did not participate in any international races from March 2020 to March 2021. Within 2 months of returning to competitive orienteering, Svensk attained his biggest individual success- a gold medal in the sprint distance at the 2021 European Orienteering Championships in Neuchâtel.

In the 2023 World Orienteering Championships he participated together with Albin Ridefeldt and Gustav Bergman in the Swedish relay team which won the bronze medal.

He won a bronze medal in sprint at the 2024 World Orienteering Championships in Edinburgh, behind Martin Regborn and Tino Polsini.

He placed sixth in the middle distance at the 2024 European Orienteering Championships in Hungary, and came second in the Relay with the Swedish team.

He finished 4th in the World Orienteering Championships 2025 - Long distance, just before his brother Viktor Svensk.

=== Club Orienteering ===
Svensk is well-known for his achievements in club orienteering, where he runs for Stora Tuna OK. With Stora Tuna, Svensk won the Jukola relay 7 times consecutively in 2019, 21, 22, 23, 24, 25 and 26, with Svensk as the last-leg runner every year except 2022 and 2026. Stora Tuna also won the 2024 Tiomila relay for the first time since 1964, with Svensk again being on last leg. This achievement meant that Stora Tuna won the men's and women's relay at both Tiomila and Jukola in the same year- the first club ever to achieve this feat.

=== Athletics ===
Svensk has won a bronze medal in the 10 km road race at the 2018 Swedish Athletics Championships, and in 2022, the Swedish was third in the Lidingöloppet over 30 km.

== Personal life ==
Svensk was born in Borlänge in 1993. Svensk has three brothers, Joakim (born 1991), Jesper (born 1998) and Viktor (born 2001), who are all competitive orienteers that contributed to Stora Tuna's victories at Tiomila and Jukola. Both Jesper and Viktor have competed for Sweden at either senior or junior level.

== Achievements ==
- EOC 2018 Silver medal in mixed sprint relay
- WOC 2018 6th place in the sprint final
- WOC 2018 Gold Medal in the mixed sprint relay
- WOC 2019 Gold Medal in the Swedish relay team
- WOC 2021 Gold Medal in the Swedish mixed sprint relay team
- EOC 2021 Gold Medal in the sprint final
- JWOC 2013 middle gold medal
- Jukola 2019 1st place with Stora Tuna OK
