= Martin Regborn =

Swedish orienteer (born 1992)

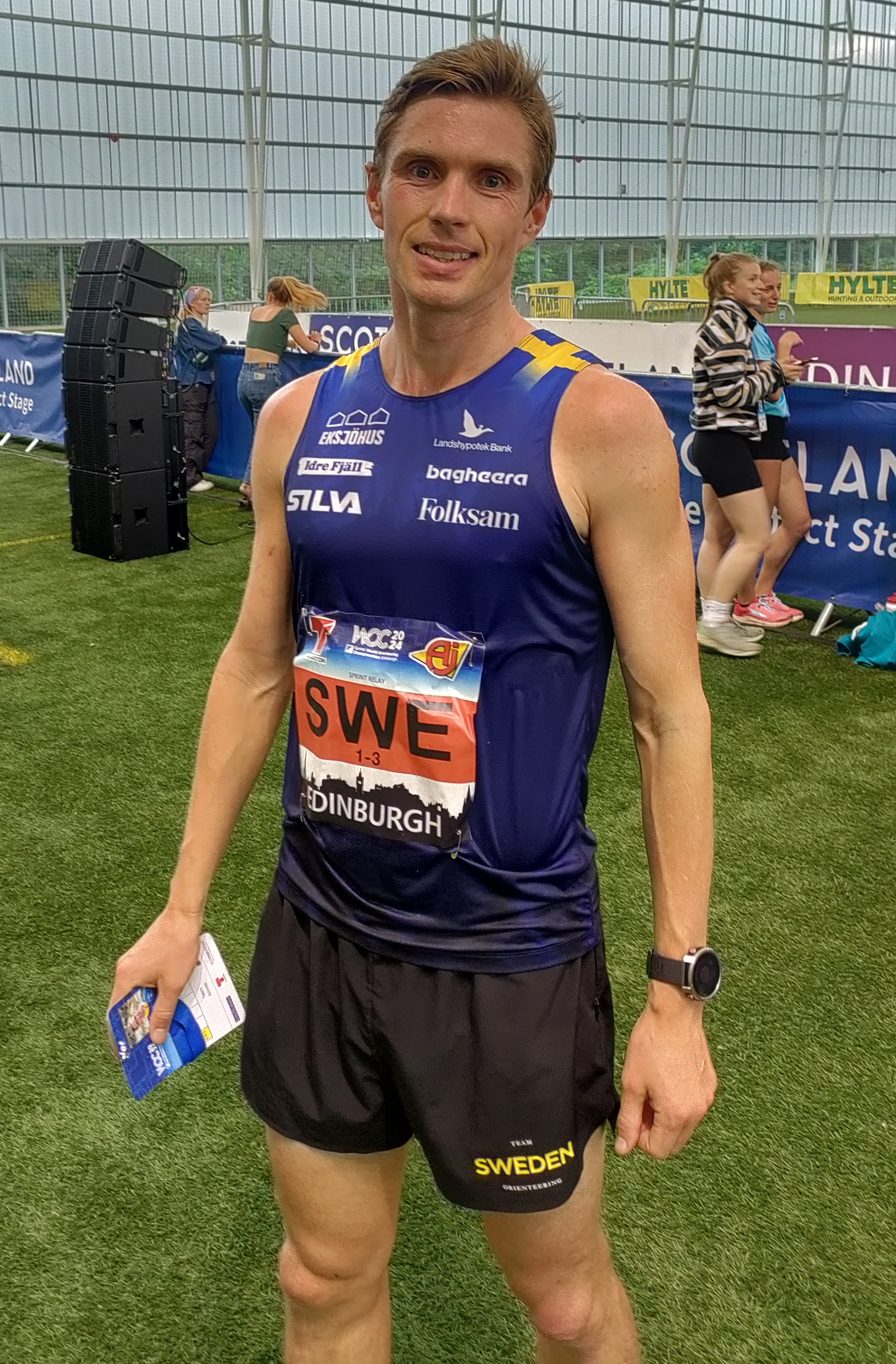
- Regborn at the 2024 World Orienteering Championships

Personal information
- Born: 10 December 1992 (age 33)

Sport
- Sport: Orienteering
- Club: Hagaby GoIF
Medal record
Representing Sweden
Men's orienteering
World Games
Silver medal – second place	2022 Birmingham	Sprint
Bronze medal – third place	2022 Birmingham	Individual
European Championships
Gold medal – first place	2022 Rakvere	Long
Bronze medal – third place	2016 Jeseník	Long
World Championships
Gold medal – first place	2024 Edinburgh	Sprint
Silver medal – second place	2025 Kuopio	Long

Martin Regborn (born 10 December 1992) is a Swedish orienteer. He won a gold medal in the long distance event at the 2022 European Orienteering Championships in Rakvere, Estonia.

Regborn won a bronze medal in the long distance at the 2016 European Orienteering Championships in Jeseník, Czech Republic. At the 2017 World Orienteering Championships in Tartu, Estonia, he placed ninth in the long distance, and seventh in the sprint final.

He won a gold medal in sprint at the 2024 World Orienteering Championships in Edinburgh, ahead of Tino Polsini and Emil Svensk. The win was Regborn's first medal in the world orienteering championships. He also qualified for the final in the knockout sprint at the world championships, where he placed fifth. In 2025, he won a silver medal in the long distance at the 2025 World Orienteering Championships in Kuopio.

As of 2024, Regborn was based in Örebro and was coaching orienteering at a high school in Hallsberg. Regborn named Emil Wingstedt as one of his orienteering idols growing up.
