= Orienteering at the 2025 World Games – Men's sprint =

Men's middle distance at the 2025 World Games
- Venue: Eastern New Area Orienteering Venue, Chengdu, China
- Date: 10 August
- Competitors: 38 from 21 nations
- Winning time: 14:59

Medalists
1st place, gold medalist(s)		Yannick Michiels	Belgium
2nd place, silver medalist(s)		Tomáš Křivda	Czech Republic
3rd place, bronze medalist(s)		Zoltán Bujdosó	Hungary

The men's sprint competition at the 2025 World Games took place on 10 August at the Eastern New Area Orienteering Venue in Chengdu, China.

== Competition format ==
A total of forty athletes from twenty-one different nations qualified, based on a point system, taking in consideration both the Orienteering World Ranking and the results from the 2024 World Orienteering Championships.

== Results ==
The results were a follows:

Rank	Athlete	Nation	Time
1st place, gold medalist(s)	Yannick Michiels	Belgium	14:59
2nd place, silver medalist(s)	Tomáš Křivda	Czech Republic	15:15
3rd place, bronze medalist(s)	Zoltán Bujdosó	Hungary	15:22
4	Riccardo Rancan	Switzerland	15:28
5	Fabian Aebersold	Switzerland	15:33
6	Tino Polsini	Switzerland	15:34
7	Jakub Glonek	Czech Republic	15:43
8	Ferenc Jónás	Hungary	15:44
9	Tim Robertson	New Zealand	15:46
10	August Mollén	Sweden	15:47
11	Joseph Lynch	New Zealand	15:49
12	Jim Bailey	Great Britain	15:55
13	Jonatan Gustafsson	Sweden	16:01
14	Anselm Reichenbach	Germany	16:02
15	Piotr Parfianowicz	Poland	16:34
16	Jannis Bonek	Austria	16:38
17	Michał Olejnik	Poland	16:39
18	Uldis Upītis	Latvia	16:41
18	Bojan Blumenstein	Germany	16:41
20	Freddie Carcas	Great Britain	17:02
21	Tang Jianda	China	17:10
22	Martin Roháč	Slovakia	17:12
23	Illia Otreshko	Ukraine	17:35
24	Alastair George	Australia	17:36
25	Shin Futamata	Japan	17:45
25	Angus Haines	Australia	17:45
27	Vegard Westergard	Canada	17:52
28	Quim Vich	Spain	17:57
29	Damian Konotopetz	Canada	18:04
30	Matthias Reiner	Austria	18:06
31	Leandro Nascimento	Brazil	18:31
32	Endijs Titomers	Latvia	18:59
33	Liu Xiaoming	China	19:13
34	Joshua Au	Hong Kong	19:19
35	Kento Kato	Japan	19:23
36	Ma Lok Hin	Hong Kong	20:09
37	Douglas Schmitz	Brazil	23:31
	Francesco Mariani	Italy	DSQ
	David Rojas	Spain	DNS
	Mattia Debertolis	Italy	DNS
