= Orienteering at the 2025 World Games – Men's middle distance =

Men's middle distance at the 2025 World Games
- Venue: Eastern New Area Orienteering Venue, Chengdu, China
- Date: 8 August
- Competitors: 40 from 21 nations
- Winning time: 45:22

Medalists
1st place, gold medalist(s)		Riccardo Rancan	Switzerland
2nd place, silver medalist(s)		Francesco Mariani	Italy
3rd place, bronze medalist(s)		Vegard Westergard	Canada

The men's middle-distance competition at the 2025 World Games took place on 8 August at the Eastern New Area Orienteering Venue in Chengdu, China.

The competition was characterized by extreme heat, with temperatures of 37 degrees Celsius seen out on the course. During the competition, Italian orienteer Mattia Debertolis collapsed and was taken to hospital, where he died two days later, receiving international attention. He was classified among 12 athletes that did not finish in the official results.

== Competition format ==
A total of forty athletes from twenty-one different nations qualified, based on a point system, taking in consideration both the Orienteering World Ranking and the results from the 2024 World Orienteering Championships.

== Results ==
The results were a follows:

Rank	Athlete	Nation	Time
1st place, gold medalist(s)	Riccardo Rancan	Switzerland	45:22
2nd place, silver medalist(s)	Francesco Mariani	Italy	47:43
3rd place, bronze medalist(s)	Vegard Westergard	Canada	47:48
4	Tim Robertson	New Zealand	48:09
5	Michał Olejnik	Poland	48:27
6	Zoltán Bujdosó	Hungary	52:12
7	Jonatan Gustafsson	Sweden	52:24
8	Yannick Michiels	Belgium	53:40
9	Tino Polsini	Switzerland	54:41
10	Jim Bailey	Great Britain	55:25
11	Bojan Blumenstein	Germany	56:13
12	Alastain George	Australia	56:16
13	David Rojas	Spain	56:31
14	Matthias Reiner	Austria	57:58
15	Joseph Lynch	New Zealand	59:33
16	August Mollén	Sweden	59:35
17	Uldis Upītis	Latvia	1:00:14
18	Tang Jianda	China	1:03:07
19	Fabian Aebersold	Switzerland	1:03:11
20	Martin Roháč	Slovakia	1:03:41
21	Douglas Schmitz	Brazil	1:04:49
22	Illia Otreshko	Ukraine	1:05:45
23	Liu Xiaoming	China	1:11:20
24	Freddie Carcas	Great Britain	1:12:09
25	Kento Kato	Japan	1:13:32
26	Damian Konotopetz	Canada	1:13:35
27	Shin Futamata	Japan	1:17:48
28	Ma Lok Hin	Hong Kong	1:20:07
	Angus Haines	Australia	DSQ
	Leandro Nascimento	Brazil	DNF
	Joshua Au	Hong Kong	DNF
	Endijs Titomers	Latvia	DNF
	Piotr Parfianowicz	Poland	DNF
	Anselm Reichenbach	Germany	DNF
	Jakub Glonek	Czech Republic	DNF
	Quim Vich	Spain	DNF
	Mattia Debertolis	Italy	DNF
	Tomáš Křivda	Czech Republic	DNF
	Ferenc Jónás	Hungary	DNF
	Jannis Bonek	Austria	DNF
