= Orienteering at the 2025 World Games =

- Venue: Eastern New Area Orienteering Venue
- Dates: 8–11 August 2025
- No. of events: 5
- Competitors: 80 from 24 nations

The orienteering competition at the 2025 World Games took place from 8 to 11 August 2025 at the Eastern New Area Orienteering Venue in Chengdu, China. The discipline had seven events, three for men, three for women, and one mixed.

== Qualification ==
A total of 80 athletes (40 men and 40 women) qualified for each event. Qualification was based on a point system, taking in consideration both the Orienteering World Ranking and the results from the 2024 World Orienteering Championships.

== Summary ==
The events started with a Middle Distance on 8 August 2025 in Gaota Village, with the terrain consisting mainly of orange groves and dense bushes. The race was noted for its heat and humidity, with a temperature of 37 degrees Celsius recorded on the course. The winners were Riccardo Rancan and Simona Aebersold, both from Switzerland. Vegard Jarvis Westergård attained Canada's first ever medal in any senior international orienteering competition with a Bronze, and Tereza Šmelíková won Slovakia's first ever international orienteering medal as well with her Silver in the Women's competition. During the Middle Distance competition, Italian runner Mattia Debertolis collapsed on the course and was admitted to hospital. Debertolis died four days later, receiving international attention.

== Participating nations ==
- Australia (4)
- Austria (4)
- Belgium (2)
- Brazil (4)
- China (4)
- Chinese Taipei (1)
- Czech Republic (4)
- Germany (4)
- Great Britain (4)
- Hong Kong (2)
- Hungary (4)
- Italy (4)
- Japan (4)
- Kazakhstan (2)
- Latvia (4)
- New Zealand (4)
- Portugal (1)
- Poland (4)
- Romania (1)
- Slovakia (2)
- Spain (4)
- Switzerland (4)
- Sweden (4)
- Ukraine (2)

== Medal table ==
* Host nation (China)

| Rank | Nation | Gold | Silver | Bronze | Total |
|---|---|---|---|---|---|
| 1 | Switzerland | 4 | 1 | 0 | 5 |
| 2 | Belgium | 1 | 0 | 0 | 1 |
| 3 | Czech Republic | 0 | 1 | 1 | 2 |
| 3 | Sweden | 0 | 1 | 1 | 2 |
| 5 | Italy | 0 | 1 | 0 | 1 |
| 5 | Slovakia | 0 | 1 | 0 | 1 |
| 7 | Canada | 0 | 0 | 1 | 1 |
| 7 | Hungary | 0 | 0 | 1 | 1 |
| 7 | Spain | 0 | 0 | 1 | 1 |
| Totals (9 entries) | | 5 | 5 | 5 | 15 |

== Medalists ==
=== Men ===
| Event | Gold | Silver | Bronze |
|---|---|---|---|
| Sprint | Yannick Michiels; Belgium | Tomáš Křivda; Czech Republic | Zoltán Bujdosó; Hungary |
| Middle distance | Riccardo Rancan; Switzerland | Francesco Mariani; Italy | Vegard Westergard; Canada |

=== Women ===
| Event | Gold | Silver | Bronze |
|---|---|---|---|
| Sprint | Simona Aebersold; Switzerland | Natalia Gemperle; Switzerland | María Prieto; Spain |
| Middle distance | Simona Aebersold; Switzerland | Tereza Šmelíková; Slovakia | Alva Sonesson; Sweden |

=== Mixed ===
| Event | Gold | Silver | Bronze |
|---|---|---|---|
| Sprint relay | Switzerland; Natalia Gemperle; Riccardo Rancan; Tino Polsini; Simona Aebersold | Sweden; Emma Bjessmo; Jonatan Gustafsson; August Mollén; Alva Sonesson | Czech Republic; Denisa Králová; Jakub Glonek; Tomáš Křivda; Tereza Rauturier |
