= 2025 World Orienteering Championships =

Orienteering event in Finland

- Location: Kuopio, Finland
- Dates: 7–12 July 2025

The 2025 World Orienteering Championships were held from 7 to 12 July in Kuopio, Finland. The championships consist of six forest competitions: middle distance, long distance and relay, for women and men, respectively. A total of 18 medals were awarded.

== Schedule ==
Date	Event	Comment
8 July	Middle – Qualification	
9 July	Middle distance – Final	
10 July	Long distance	
11 July	Rest day	
12 July	Relay	

== Results ==
The competition started with a middle qualifier on the 8 July. On 9 July, the middle final was held, where the Women's podium was a clean sweep for Sweden, with defending champion Tove Alexandersson winning the gold and Sanna Fast and Hanna Lundberg claiming the other medals. This was the first time a World Championship podium was filled by only one nation since 2011, when the Swedish women won all available medals at the sprint. In the Men's final, European champion Eirik Langedal Breivik won ahead of Kasper Fosser, with the bronze being won by Anton Johansson by only one second ahead of defending world champion Matthias Kyburz from Switzerland.

In the Long Distance on 10 July, Kasper Harlem Fosser and Simona Aebersold both successfully defended their titles from the previous world championships in 2023, with Aebersold defeating Tove Alexandersson by only nine seconds after Alexandersson made some mistakes late on the course. The women's podium was exactly the same as the podium in 2023, with Andrine Benjaminsen retaining her bronze medal. On the men's side, Matthias Kyburz received the bronze ahead of Emil Svensk by a margin of only 11 seconds, with Sprint world champion Martin Regborn attaining the silver medal.

On 12 July, the relay event was held, with Sweden dominating the women's race with strong races from the three medalists from the middle distance, Tove Alexandersson, Sanna Fast and Hanna Lundberg. Norway came second, with Switzerland coming third. On the men's race, defending champions Switzerland were defeated by Norway, with the relay being decided by Eirik Langedal Breivik and Kasper Fosser on the last two legs for Norway's first victory in the relay since 2018. Switzerland came second, and Finland came third, after Max Peter Bejmer from Sweden's team made a mistake on the last leg and missed a control. Miika Kirmula from Finland decided the relay on the last few controls, after a competitive battle with Lucas Basset of France, who took fourth place.

=== Women's Middle ===
WOC 2025 – Middle – Women
Rank	Competitor	Nation	Time
1st place, gold medalist(s)	Tove Alexandersson	Sweden	33:17
2nd place, silver medalist(s)	Sanna Fast	Sweden	34:19
3rd place, bronze medalist(s)	Hanna Lundberg	Sweden	35:43
4	Andrine Benjaminsen	Norway	36:50
5	Simona Aebersold	Switzerland	36:57
6	Natalia Gemperle	Switzerland	37:17
7=	Marika Teini	Finland	37:30
7=	Evely Kaasiku	Estonia	37:30
9	Ida Haapala	Finland	37:33
10	Aleksandra Hornik	Poland	37:46

=== Men's Middle ===
WOC 2025 – Middle – Men
Rank	Competitor	Nation	Time
1st place, gold medalist(s)	Eirik Langedal Breivik	Norway	33:42
2nd place, silver medalist(s)	Kasper Harlem Fosser	Norway	34:16
3rd place, bronze medalist(s)	Anton Johansson	Sweden	34:49
4	Matthias Kyburz	Switzerland	34:50
5	Miika Kirmula	Finland	35:24
6	Gustav Bergman	Sweden	35:30
7	Matthieu Perrin	France	35:55
8	Max Peter Bejmer	Sweden	36:17
9=	Lukas Liland	Norway	36:34
9=	Daniel Hubmann	Switzerland	36:34

=== Women's Long ===
WOC 2025 – Long – Women
Rank	Competitor	Nation	Time
1st place, gold medalist(s)	Simona Aebersold	Switzerland	1:34:51
2nd place, silver medalist(s)	Tove Alexandersson	Sweden	1:35:00
3rd place, bronze medalist(s)	Andrine Benjaminsen	Norway	1:37:16
4	Natalia Gemperle	Switzerland	1:38:22
5	Sanna Fast	Sweden	1:39:11
6	Venla Harju	Finland	1:41:27
7	Sara Hagstrom	Sweden	1:44:21
8	Ida Haapala	Finland	1:45:21
9	Hanna Lundberg	Sweden	1:46:24
10	Marie Olaussen	Norway	1:48:17

=== Men's Long ===
WOC 2025 – Long – Men
Rank	Competitor	Nation	Time
1st place, gold medalist(s)	Kasper Harlem Fosser	Norway	1:37:50
2nd place, silver medalist(s)	Martin Regborn	Sweden	1:40:47
3rd place, bronze medalist(s)	Matthias Kyburz	Switzerland	1:41:30
4	Emil Svensk	Sweden	1:41:41
5	Viktor Svensk	Sweden	1:43:10
6	Miika Kirmula	Finland	1:43:33
7	Martin Hubmann	Switzerland	1:44:44
8	Lukas Liland	Norway	1:44:51
9	Akseli Ruohola	Finland	1:46:00
10	Jannis Bonek	Austria	1:49:48

== Medal summary ==
=== Men ===
Event	Gold		Silver		Bronze	
Middle distance	Eirik Langedal Breivik; Norway	33:42	Kasper Harlem Fosser; Norway	34:16	Anton Johansson; Sweden	34:49
Long distance	Kasper Harlem Fosser; Norway	1:37:50	Martin Regborn; Sweden	1:40:47	Matthias Kyburz; Switzerland	1:41:30
Relay	Norway; Jørgen Baklid; Eirik Langedal Breivik; Kasper Harlem Fosser	1:41:38	Switzerland; Daniel Hubmann; Fabian Aebersold; Matthias Kyburz	1:43:28	Finland; Topi Syrjäläinen; Akseli Ruohola; Miika Kirmula	1:46:27

=== Women ===
Event	Gold		Silver		Bronze	
Middle distance	Tove Alexandersson; Sweden	33:17	Sanna Fast; Sweden	34:19	Hanna Lundberg; Sweden	35:43
Long distance	Simona Aebersold; Switzerland	1:34:51	Tove Alexandersson; Sweden	1:35:00	Andrine Benjaminsen; Norway	1:37:16
Relay	Sweden; Hanna Lundberg; Sanna Fast; Tove Alexandersson	1:41:32	Norway; Pia Young Vik; Marie Olaussen; Andrine Benjaminsen	1:44:00	Switzerland; Paula Gross; Natalia Gemperle; Simona Aebersold	1:45:32

=== Medal table ===
* Host nation (Finland)

Rank	Nation	Gold	Silver	Bronze	Total
1	Norway	3	2	1	6
2	Sweden	2	3	2	7
3	Switzerland	1	1	2	4
4	Finland*	0	0	1	1
Totals (4 entries)		6	6	6	18
