= Dancesport at the 2025 World Games – Standard =

Standard at the 2025 World Games
- Venue: Chengbei Gymnasium, Chengdu, China
- Date: 9 August
- Competitors: 46 from 15 nations

Medalists
| 1st place, gold medalist(s) | | Alexey Glukhov; Anastasia Glazunova | Moldova |
| 2nd place, silver medalist(s) | | Rareș Cojoc; Andreea Matei | Romania |
| 3rd place, bronze medalist(s) | | Dariusz Myćka; Madara Freiberga | Poland |

The Standard competition in dancesport at the 2025 World Games took place on 9 August 2025 at the Chengbei Gymnasium in Chengdu, China.

A total of 23 couples participated from 15 nations.

== Results ==
=== First Round ===
The results were as follows:

| Rank | Dancers | Nation | Walz | Tango | Viennese Waltz | Slow Foxtrot | Quickstep | Total |
|---|---|---|---|---|---|---|---|---|
| 1 | Alexey Glukhov; Anastasia Glazunova | Moldova | 38.50 | 38.58 | 38.50 | 38.58 | 38.67 | 192.84 |
| 2 | Rareș Cojoc; Andreea Matei | Romania | 37.58 | 37.83 | 37.92 | 38.00 | 38.08 | 189.42 |
| 3 | Dariusz Myćka; Madara Freiberga | Poland | 37.08 | 37.17 | 37.08 | 37.33 | 37.25 | 185.91 |
| 4 | Vadim Shurin; Anastasia Meshkova | Latvia | 36.50 | 36.92 | 36.83 | 36.92 | 36.92 | 184.08 |
| 5 | Georgy Kalashnikov; Daria Grigore | Romania | 36.25 | 36.87 | 36.58 | 36.95 | 37.03 | 183.68 |
| 6 | Andrea Roccatti; Julia Maria Mozdyniewicz | Italy | 36.00 | 36.17 | 35.92 | 36.08 | 36.08 | 180.25 |
| 7 | Simonas Seikauskas; Liucija Norusaite | Lithuania | 34.83 | 35.25 | 35.08 | 35.08 | 35.42 | 175.67 |
| 8 | Bartlomiej Szkutnik; Agata Brychcy | Poland | 34.83 | 34.75 | 35.17 | 34.75 | 34.75 | 174.25 |
| 9 | Tan Ran; Zhou Xinning | China | 34.50 | 34.67 | 34.33 | 34.50 | 35.08 | 173.08 |
| 10 | Vladislav Kozhevnikov; Eleonora Metelitsa | Israel | 34.42 | 34.50 | 34.33 | 34.58 | 34.33 | 172.16 |
| 11 | Dusan Grula; Giada Cragnolini | Slovakia | 34.33 | 34.42 | 34.17 | 34.58 | 34.42 | 171.92 |
| 12 | Ilia Rotar; Silvia Susanne Barjabin | Estonia | 34.50 | 34.00 | 34.08 | 34.25 | 34.42 | 171.25 |
| 13 | Emanuele Cannistraro; Anna Lubianetska | Ukraine | 34.00 | 34.17 | 34.08 | 34.33 | 33.92 | 170.50 |
| 14 | Romans Dobrecovs; Violetta Levchenko | Latvia | 33.83 | 34.08 | 33.75 | 34.00 | 33.92 | 169.58 |
| 15 | Nikita Anikeev; Elina Kokotova | Individual Neutral Athletes | 33.83 | 34.00 | 33.83 | 33.92 | 33.58 | 169.17 |
| 16 | Karolis Burneikis; Fabien Lax | Germany | 33.83 | 33.42 | 33.75 | 33.92 | 34.08 | 169.00 |
| 17 | Matteo del Gaone; Ekaterina Utkina | Italy | 34.08 | 33.42 | 33.42 | 33.83 | 33.75 | 168.50 |
| 18 | Xu Ziyin; Yan Xinru | China | 33.42 | 33.75 | 33.33 | 33.50 | 33.42 | 167.42 |
| 19 | Xie Ziang; Shao Yawen | China | 33.33 | 33.42 | 33.25 | 33.00 | 33.17 | 166.17 |
| 20 | Mark Ziv; Marika Odikadze | Israel | 33.17 | 33.42 | 33.00 | 33.08 | 33.00 | 165.67 |
| 21 | Earle Williamson; Veronika Myshko | Ukraine | 32.75 | 32.58 | 32.55 | 32.58 | 32.92 | 163.39 |
| 22 | Kim Ki-hwan; Park Ye-rang | South Korea | 31.33 | 31.17 | 31.25 | 31.75 | 31.50 | 157.00 |
| 23 | Egor Bezukladnikov; Irene Lee | United States | 30.67 | 30.75 | 30.50 | 30.17 | 30.25 | 152.33 |

=== Semifinal ===
The results were as follows:

| Rank | Dancers | Nation | Walz | Tango | Viennese Waltz | Slow Foxtrot | Quickstep | Total |
|---|---|---|---|---|---|---|---|---|
| 1 | Alexey Glukhov; Anastasia Glazunova | Moldova | 38.75 | 38.75 | 38.58 | 38.67 | 38.83 | 193.58 |
| 2 | Rareș Cojoc; Andreea Matei | Romania | 38.17 | 38.17 | 38.17 | 38.17 | 38.17 | 190.84 |
| 3 | Dariusz Myćka; Madara Freiberga | Poland | 37.33 | 37.42 | 37.42 | 37.58 | 37.58 | 187.33 |
| 4 | Georgy Kalashnikov; Daria Grigore | Romania | 37.00 | 37.00 | 36.67 | 37.00 | 36.83 | 184.50 |
| 5 | Vadim Shurin; Anastasia Meshkova | Latvia | 36.83 | 36.67 | 36.67 | 36.83 | 36.92 | 183.92 |
| 6 | Andrea Roccatti; Julia Maria Mozdyniewicz | Italy | 36.17 | 36.33 | 35.92 | 36.00 | 36.00 | 180.42 |
| 7 | Simonas Seikauskas; Liucija Norusaite | Lithuania | 35.25 | 35.67 | 35.33 | 35.58 | 35.83 | 177.67 |
| 8 | Bartlomiej Szkutnik; Agata Brychcy | Poland | 34.75 | 34.67 | 34.67 | 34.83 | 34.75 | 173.67 |
| 9 | Vladislav Kozhevnikov; Eleonora Metelitsa | Israel | 34.50 | 34.58 | 34.50 | 34.67 | 34.75 | 173.00 |
| 10 | Tan Ran; Zhou Xinning | China | 34.58 | 34.42 | 34.42 | 34.50 | 34.67 | 172.58 |
| 11 | Dusan Grula; Giada Cragnolini | Slovakia | 34.50 | 34.17 | 34.42 | 34.42 | 34.08 | 171.59 |
| 12 | Ilia Rotar; Silvia Susanne Barjabin | Estonia | 34.50 | 34.17 | 34.17 | 34.42 | 34.25 | 171.50 |
| 13 | Romans Dobrecovs; Violetta Levchenko | Latvia | 34.08 | 33.92 | 33.58 | 33.92 | 34.17 | 169.67 |
| 14 | Emanuele Cannistraro; Anna Lubianetska | Ukraine | 34.00 | 34.00 | 33.67 | 33.83 | 33.58 | 169.08 |

=== Final ===
The results were as follows:

| Rank | Dancers | Nation | Walz | Tango | Viennese Waltz | Slow Foxtrot | Quickstep | Total |
|---|---|---|---|---|---|---|---|---|
| 1st place, gold medalist(s) | Alexey Glukhov; Anastasia Glazunova | Moldova | 39.33 | 39.33 | 39.17 | 39.42 | 39.33 | 196.58 |
| 2nd place, silver medalist(s) | Rareș Cojoc; Andreea Matei | Romania | 38.75 | 38.67 | 38.33 | 38.67 | 38.58 | 193.00 |
| 3rd place, bronze medalist(s) | Dariusz Myćka; Madara Freiberga | Poland | 37.75 | 37.63 | 37.42 | 37.67 | 37.58 | 188.04 |
| 4 | Vadim Shurin; Anastasia Meshkova | Latvia | 37.17 | 37.29 | 36.67 | 37.00 | 37.00 | 185.12 |
| 5 | Georgy Kalashnikov; Daria Grigore | Romania | 37.04 | 36.92 | 36.58 | 37.25 | 36.75 | 184.54 |
| 6 | Andrea Roccatti; Julia Maria Mozdyniewicz | Italy | 36.00 | 36.25 | 35.67 | 36.08 | 36.00 | 180.00 |
