= Disc golf at the 2025 World Games =

- Venue: Guixi Park, Chengdu, United States
- Dates: 8–10 August 2025
- Competitors: 32 from 16 nations

The mixed team disc golf event at the 2025 World Games will take place from 8 to 10 August 2025 at Guixi Park in Chengdu. 32 players from 16 countries will compete in a mixed team match play tournament. This will be disc golf's second appearance at the world games, the first coming in 2001 in Akita, Japan.

== Competition format and schedule ==
16 nations will compete; each country will select one male and one female athlete for a total of 32 participants. Teams will be divided into four pools and play a round robin schedule, with the top two teams in each pool advancing to an eight team single elimination knockout tournament. Individual matches will be played in a match play format, using the PDGA Alternate Shot format in which "each team member throws from the lie resulting from the other team member's throw until they complete the hole". Each player must tee off on 9 of the 18 holes, and no player can tee off more than two times in a row; teams will designate which player will tee off which holes prior to the match beginning.

== Course ==
Hole	Meters	Par	Hole	Meters	Par
1	184	4	10	88	3
2	97	3	11	122	3
3	72	3	12	136	4
4	75	3	13	130	4
5	125	3	14	101	3
6	108	3	15	160	4
7	105	4	16	90	3
8	133	4	17	98	3
9	76	3	18	111	3
Out	975	30	In	1,036	30
Source:		Total		2,011	60

== Schedule ==
The competition will begin with all three pool play matches on 8 August. The following day will hold the quarterfinals and semifinals in both the medal bracket and the consolation bracket. The tournament will conclude on 10 August with both medal matches as well as all of the placement matches.

Date	Time	Round
Friday, 8 August 2025	8:30	Preliminary round, Game 1
Friday, 8 August 2025	14:00	Preliminary round, Game 2
Friday, 8 August 2025	16:30	Preliminary round, Game 3
Saturday, 9 August 2025	9:00	Quarterfinals
Saturday, 9 August 2025	9:00	Placings 9-16
Saturday, 9 August 2025	14:30	Placings 9-12
Saturday, 9 August 2025	14:30	Placings 13-16
Saturday, 9 August 2025	14:45	Placings 5-8
Saturday, 9 August 2025	15:15	Semifinals
Sunday, 10 August 2025	8:30	15th Place Game
Sunday, 10 August 2025	8:40	13th Place Game
Sunday, 10 August 2025	8:50	11th Place Game
Sunday, 10 August 2025	9:00	9th Place Game
Sunday, 10 August 2025	9:10	7th Place Game
Sunday, 10 August 2025	9:20	5th Place Game
Sunday, 10 August 2025	14:30	Bronze Medal Match
Sunday, 10 August 2025	14:45	Gold Medal Match

== Teams ==
Team	Players	
Australia	Blake Houston	Cassie Sweetten
Austria	Stanislaus Amann	Raphaela Narath
Canada	Thomas Gilbert	Sofia Donnecke
China	ChenFei Zhao	Yanwen Ma
Czech Republic	Petr Striegler	Kristyna Jurcikova
Estonia	Silver Lätt	Kristin Lätt
Finland	Nestori Tuhkanen	Eveliina Salonen
France	Dorian Legendre	Maria Buitrago
Germany	Timo Hartmann	Wiebke Jahn
Great Britain	Ben Holding	Rachel Turton
Japan	Manabu Kajiyama	Rika Tsukamoto
Latvia	Rainers Balodis	Elizabete Peksena
Lithuania	Gabrielius Gricius	Miret Jurgeleviciut
Norway	Oyvind Jarnes	Anniken Kristiansen Steen
Slovakia	Thomas Mozola	Katarina Bodova
United States	Gannon Buhr	Missy Gannon

== Preliminary round ==
=== Group A ===
Pos	Team	Pld	W	D	L	Pts	Qualification	EST	GBR	AUT	CHN
1	Estonia	3	2	1	0	5	Quarterfinals	—	5–1	1–1	5–0
2	Great Britain	3	2	0	1	4	Quarterfinals	1–5	—	4–2	4–1
3	Austria	3	1	1	1	3	Placement Matches	1–1	2–4	—	5–4
4	China	3	0	0	3	0	Placement Matches	0–5	1–4	4–5	—

Hole	1	2	3	4	5	6	7	8	9	10	11	12	13	14	15	16	17	18	Result
Estonia	6	3	3	3	2	2	3	3	2										5
Great Britain	5	4	4	3	3	3	3	4	2										1
Score	1U	AS	1U	1U	1U	2U	3U	4U	4U										4&3
Starting Hole: 1, reduced to 12 holes due to heat. Report:

Hole	1	2	3	4	5	6	7	8	9	10	11	12	13	14	15	16	17	18	Result
Austria			3	4	3	3	4	4	3	2	4	5	4	3					6
China			4	3	4	4	3	3	4	2	3	4	5	4					5
Score			1U	AS	1U	2U	1U	AS	1U	1U	AS	1U	AS	1U					1U
Starting Hole: 3, reduced to 12 holes due to heat. Report:

Hole	1	2	3	4	5	6	7	8	9	10	11	12	13	14	15	16	17	18	Result
Estonia	3	3	2	3	3											3	3	2	5
China	6	3	3	3	4											4	3	3	0
Score	3U	3U	4U	4U	5U											1U	1U	2U	5&4
Starting Hole: 16, reduced to 12 holes due to heat. Report:

Hole	1	2	3	4	5	6	7	8	9	10	11	12	13	14	15	16	17	18	Result
Austria	4	4	3	3	4	3	4							3	4	4	4	3	2
Great Britain	4	4	4	4	3	3	3							3	4	3	3	3	4
Score	2U	2U	1U	AS	1U	1U	2U							AS	AS	1U	2U	2U	2U
Starting Hole: 14, reduced to 12 holes due to heat. Report:

Hole	1	2	3	4	5	6	7	8	9	10	11	12	13	14	15	16	17	18	Result
Estonia	4	3	3							2	4	3	3	3	4	3	3	2	1
Austria	5	3	3							2	3	3	3	3	4	3	3	2	1
Score	AS	AS	AS							AS	1U	1U	1U	1U	1U	1U	1U	1U	AS
Starting Hole: 10, reduced to 12 holes due to heat. Report:

Hole	1	2	3	4	5	6	7	8	9	10	11	12	13	14	15	16	17	18	Result
Great Britain	6	4	2									4	3	3	3	4	2	2	4
China	5	4	3									4	3	3	4	4	3	3	1
Score	2U	2U	3U									AS	AS	AS	1U	1U	2U	3U	3&2
Starting Hole: 12, reduced to 12 holes due to heat. Report:

=== Group B ===
Pos	Team	Pld	W	D	L	Pts	Qualification	CAN	NOR	AUS	LTU
1	Canada	3	2	1	0	5	Quarterfinals	—	3–3	4–3	5–0
2	Norway	3	2	1	0	5	Quarterfinals	3–3	—	5–0	3–0
3	Australia	3	0	1	2	1	Placement Matches	3–4	0–5	—	3–3
4	Lithuania	3	0	1	2	1	Placement Matches	0–5	0–3	3–3	—

Hole	1	2	3	4	5	6	7	8	9	10	11	12	13	14	15	16	17	18	Result
Canada					4	3	3	3	2	2	3	3	4	3	3	3			3
Norway					4	4	3	3	2	3	2	3	3	2	4	3			3
Score					AS	1U	1U	1U	1U	2U	1U	1U	AS	1U	AS				AS
Starting Hole: 5, reduced to 12 holes due to heat. Report:

Hole	1	2	3	4	5	6	7	8	9	10	11	12	13	14	15	16	17	18	Result
Australia							3	4	2	3	3	4	3	3	5	3	2	3	3
Lithuania							3	4	3	2	3	3	3	4	4	3	3	3	3
Score							AS	AS	1U	AS	AS	1U	1U	AS	1U	AS	AS	AS	AS
Starting Hole: 7, reduced to 12 holes due to heat. Report:

Hole	1	2	3	4	5	6	7	8	9	10	11	12	13	14	15	16	17	18	Result
Canada	5											3	2	3	3	3	3	3	5
Lithuania	6											3	3	4	4	4	3	3	0
Score	5U											AS	1U	2U	3U	4U	4U	4U	5&4
Starting Hole: 12, reduced to 12 holes due to heat. Report:

Hole	1	2	3	4	5	6	7	8	9	10	11	12	13	14	15	16	17	18	Result
Australia										3	4	4	3	3	5	3	3		0
Norway										3	3	3	2	3	4	2	3		5
Score										AS	1U	2U	3U	3U	4U	5U	5U		5&4
Starting Hole: 10, reduced to 12 holes due to heat. Report:

Hole	1	2	3	4	5	6	7	8	9	10	11	12	13	14	15	16	17	18	Result
Canada	4	4	2	3	2	3								3	4	4	3	3	4
Australia	5	3	3	3	3	3								4	3	4	3	3	2
Score	1U	AS	1U	1U	2U	2U								1U	AS	AS	AS	AS	2&1
Starting Hole: 14, reduced to 12 holes due to heat. Report:

Hole	1	2	3	4	5	6	7	8	9	10	11	12	13	14	15	16	17	18	Result
Norway	5	3	3	3	3	3	3									3	3	3	3
Lithuania	5	4	3	3	3	3	4									3	3	4	0
Score	1U	2U	2U	2U	2U	2U	3U									AS	AS	1U	3&2
Starting Hole: 16, reduced to 12 holes due to heat. Report:

=== Group C ===
Pos	Team	Pld	W	D	L	Pts	Qualification	FIN	LAT	FRA	GER
1	Finland	3	2	0	1	4	Quarterfinals	—	4–3	3–2	2–4
2	Latvia	3	2	0	1	4	Quarterfinals	3–4	—	5–0	3–2
3	France	3	1	0	2	2	Placement Matches	2–3	0–5	—	5–1
4	Germany	3	1	0	2	2	Placement Matches	4–2	2–3	1–5	—

Hole	1	2	3	4	5	6	7	8	9	10	11	12	13	14	15	16	17	18	Result
Finland	4	4	2							2	3	4	3	3	3	3	3	2	3
France	4	5	3							2	3	3	2	3	3	3	3	3	2
Score	1U	AS	1U							AS	AS	1U	2U	2U	2U	2U	2U	1U	1U
Starting Hole: 10, reduced to 12 holes due to heat. Report:

Hole	1	2	3	4	5	6	7	8	9	10	11	12	13	14	15	16	17	18	Result
Germany	4	3	3	3	3							4	4	3	4	2	3	2	2
Latvia	4	2	3	2	3							4	3	3	4	3	3	3	3
Score	1U	AS	AS	1U	1U							AS	1U	1U	1U	AS	AS	1U	1U
Starting Hole: 12, reduced to 12 holes due to heat. Report:

Hole	1	2	3	4	5	6	7	8	9	10	11	12	13	14	15	16	17	18	Result
Finland							3	3	3	3	4	4	3	3	4	3	2	3	4
Latvia							4	3	3	3	3	3	4	2	5	3	3	3	3
Score							1U	1U	1U	1U	AS	1U	AS	1U	AS	AS	1U	1U	1U
Starting Hole: 7, reduced to 12 holes due to heat. Report:

Hole	1	2	3	4	5	6	7	8	9	10	11	12	13	14	15	16	17	18	Result
France					2	2	3	4	3	2	4	4	3						5
Germany					3	3	4	4	2	3	4	4	4						1
Score					1U	2U	3U	3U	2U	3U	3U	3U	4U						4&3
Starting Hole: 5, reduced to 12 holes due to heat. Report:

Hole	1	2	3	4	5	6	7	8	9	10	11	12	13	14	15	16	17	18	Result
Finland	5	3	4	3	3	3	3	3	2	2	3	4							2
Germany	4	3	3	2	3	3	3	3	3	3	3	3							4
Score	1U	1U	2U	3U	3U	3U	3U	3U	2U	1U	1U	2U							2U
Starting Hole: 1, reduced to 12 holes due to heat. Report:

Hole	1	2	3	4	5	6	7	8	9	10	11	12	13	14	15	16	17	18	Result
France			3	4	3	4	4	3	3	2									0
Latvia			3	3	3	3	3	2	2	2									5
Score			AS	1U	1U	2U	3U	4U	5U	5U									5&4
Starting Hole: 3, reduced to 12 holes due to heat. Report:

=== Group D ===
Pos	Team	Pld	W	D	L	Pts	Qualification	USA	CZE	SVK	JPN
1	United States	3	2	1	0	5	Quarterfinals	—	4–4	4–2	3–0
2	Czech Republic	3	1	1	1	3	Quarterfinals	4–4	—	5–0	2–3
3	Slovakia	3	1	0	2	2	Placement Matches	2–4	0–5	—	4–1
4	Japan	3	1	0	2	2	Placement Matches	0–3	3–2	1–4	—

Hole	1	2	3	4	5	6	7	8	9	10	11	12	13	14	15	16	17	18	Result
United States	4	4	2	3	3	3								2	3	3	3	2	3
Japan	4	4	3	3	4	4								2	3	3	3	2	0
Score	AS	AS	1U	1U	2U	3U								AS	AS	AS	AS	AS	3&1
Starting Hole: 14, reduced to 12 holes due to heat. Report:

Hole	1	2	3	4	5	6	7	8	9	10	11	12	13	14	15	16	17	18	Result
Czech Republic	4	3	3	3	3											3	2	3	5
Slovakia	5	3	4	4	3											4	3	3	0
Score	3U	3U	4U	5U	5U											1U	2U	2U	5&4
Starting Hole: 14, reduced to 12 holes due to heat. Report:

Hole	1	2	3	4	5	6	7	8	9	10	11	12	13	14	15	16	17	18	Result
United States			2	3	3	3	3	3	2	3	4	3	3						4
Slovakia			4	3	3	2	3	4	3	3	3	3	4						2
Score			1U	1U	1U	AS	AS	1U	2U	2U	1U	1U	2U						2&1
Starting Hole: 3, reduced to 12 holes due to heat. Report:

Hole	1	2	3	4	5	6	7	8	9	10	11	12	13	14	15	16	17	18	Result
Czech Republic	4	3	4	3	3	3	4	3	3	3	4	4							2
Japan	5	4	3	3	3	3	4	3	3	2	4	3							3
Score	1U	2U	1U	1U	1U	1U	1U	1U	1U	AS	AS	1U							1U
Starting Hole: 1, reduced to 12 holes due to heat. Report:

Hole	1	2	3	4	5	6	7	8	9	10	11	12	13	14	15	16	17	18	Result
United States					2	2	3	3	2	3	5	3	3	3	5	3			4
Czech Republic					4	4	4	3	2	2	3	4	3	2	4	3			4
Score					1U	2U	3U	3U	3U	2U	1U	2U	2U	1U	AS	AS			AS
Starting Hole: 5, reduced to 12 holes due to heat. Report:

Hole	1	2	3	4	5	6	7	8	9	10	11	12	13	14	15	16	17	18	Result
Japan							3	3	4	2	3	3	5	3	6	3			1
Slovakia							3	3	3	3	3	2	3	3	5	3			4
Score							AS	AS	1U	AS	AS	1U	2U	2U	3U	3U			3&2
Starting Hole: 7, reduced to 12 holes due to heat. Report:

== Consolation rounds ==
=== Placings 9-12 ===
13th place
Austria	1 UP
Australia
15th place
China
Germany	7 UP

Placings 13-16
Austria	2 UP
China
Germany
Australia	2 UP

Placings 9-16
Austria
Japan	5 UP
Slovakia	3 UP
China
Lithuania	2 UP
Germany
France	1 UP
Australia

Placings 9-12
Japan	1 UP
Slovakia
Lithuania
France	5 UP

9th place
Japan
France	3 UP
11th place
Slovakia	5 UP
Lithuania

=== Placings 5-8 ===
Placings 5-8
Great Britain
Czech Republic	3 UP
Norway	3 UP
Canada

5th place
Czech Republic
Norway	1 UP
7th place
Great Britain
Canada	1 UP

== Final round ==
Quarterfinals
Estonia	4 UP
Czech Republic
United States	7 UP
Great Britain
Canada
Latvia	3 UP
Finland	3 UP
Norway

Semifinals
Estonia
United States	3 UP
Latvia
Finland	1 UP

Finals
United States	5 UP
Finland
Third place
Estonia
Latvia	1 UP

== Final ranking ==
Rank	Team
1st place, gold medalist(s)	United States
2nd place, silver medalist(s)	Finland
3rd place, bronze medalist(s)	Latvia
4	Estonia
5	Norway
6	Czech Republic
7	Canada
8	Great Britain
9	France
10	Japan
11	Slovakia
12	Lithuania
13	Austria
14	Australia
15	Germany
16	China
