= Anton Johansson =

Anton Johansson may refer to:

- Anton Johanson (1877–1952), sometimes Johansson, Swedish football player and manager
- Anton Johansson (orienteer) (born 1994), Swedish orienteering competitor
- Anton Johansson (ice hockey) (born 2004), Swedish ice hockey player
