= Moldova at the 2025 World Games =

- IOC code: MDA
- NOC: National Olympic Committee of the Republic of Moldova

in Chengdu, China 7 August 2025 – 17 August 2025
- Competitors: 4 (3 men and 1 woman) in 3 sports and 3 events
- Medals Ranked 34th: Gold 2 Silver 0 Bronze 0 Total 2

World Games appearances
- 1981; 1985; 1989; 1993; 1997; 2001; 2005; 2009; 2013; 2017; 2022; 2025

Moldova competed at the 2025 World Games held in Chengdu, China from 7 to 17 August 2025.

Athletes representing Moldova won two gold medals. The country finished in 34th place in the medal table.

== Medalists ==
| Medal | Name | Sport | Event | Date |
|---|---|---|---|---|
| Gold | Alexey Glukhov; Anastasia Glazunova | Dancesport | Standard | 9 August |
| Gold | Artiom Livadari | Muaythai | Men's 86 kg | 10 August |

== Competitors ==
The following is the list of number of competitors in the Games.

| Sport | Men | Women | Total |
|---|---|---|---|
| Dancesport | 1 | 1 | 2 |
| Kickboxing | 1 | 0 | 1 |
| Muaythai | 1 | 0 | 1 |
| Total | 3 | 1 | 4 |
