= Muaythai at the 2025 World Games – Men's 86 kg =

World Games muaythai event

Men's 86 kg at the 2025 World Games
- Muaythai pictogram
- Venue: Sichuan Provincial Gymnasium
- Dates: 8–10 August 2025
- Competitors: 8 from 8 nations

Medalists
1st place, gold medalist(s)		Artiom Livadari	Moldova
2nd place, silver medalist(s)		Aaron Ortiz	United States
3rd place, bronze medalist(s)		Zhang Chengcheng	China

The men's 86 kg muaythai (Note: Muaythai is the official name of Muay Thai, recognized by International World Games Association and International Olympic Committee.) event at the 2025 World Games will be held from 8 to 10 August 2025 at the Sichuan Provincial Gymnasium. 8 Muay Thai practitioners from 8 nations participated in the event.

== Competition schedule ==
All times are in local time (UTC+8), according to the official schedule.

Date	Time	Event
8 August 2025	20:00	Quarterfinals
9 August 2025	20:30	Semifinals
10 August 2025	19:15	Bronze medal match
10 August 2025	20:45	Gold medal match

== Results ==
=== Legend ===
- RET — Won by Retirement
- RSC-H — Won by Referee Stopping Contest - Hard Head Blows
- WO — Won by Walkover

=== Bracket ===
Quarterfinals
Aaron Ortiz (USA)	WO
Andreas Lilliecrona (SWE)
Damian Collins (RSA)	30
Khumoyun Pulatov (UZB)	27
Zhang Chengcheng (CHN)	30
Antonio Totomol (MEX)	27
Artiom Livadari (MDA)	30
Vito Košar (CRO)	27

Semifinals
Aaron Ortiz (USA)	30
Damian Collins (RSA)	27
Zhang Chengcheng (CHN)
Artiom Livadari (MDA)	30

Gold medal bout
Aaron Ortiz (USA)	27
Artiom Livadari (MDA)	30
Bronze medal bout
Damian Collins (RSA)
Zhang Chengcheng (CHN)	RSC-H
