= Pia Young Vik =

Norwegian orienteering competitor

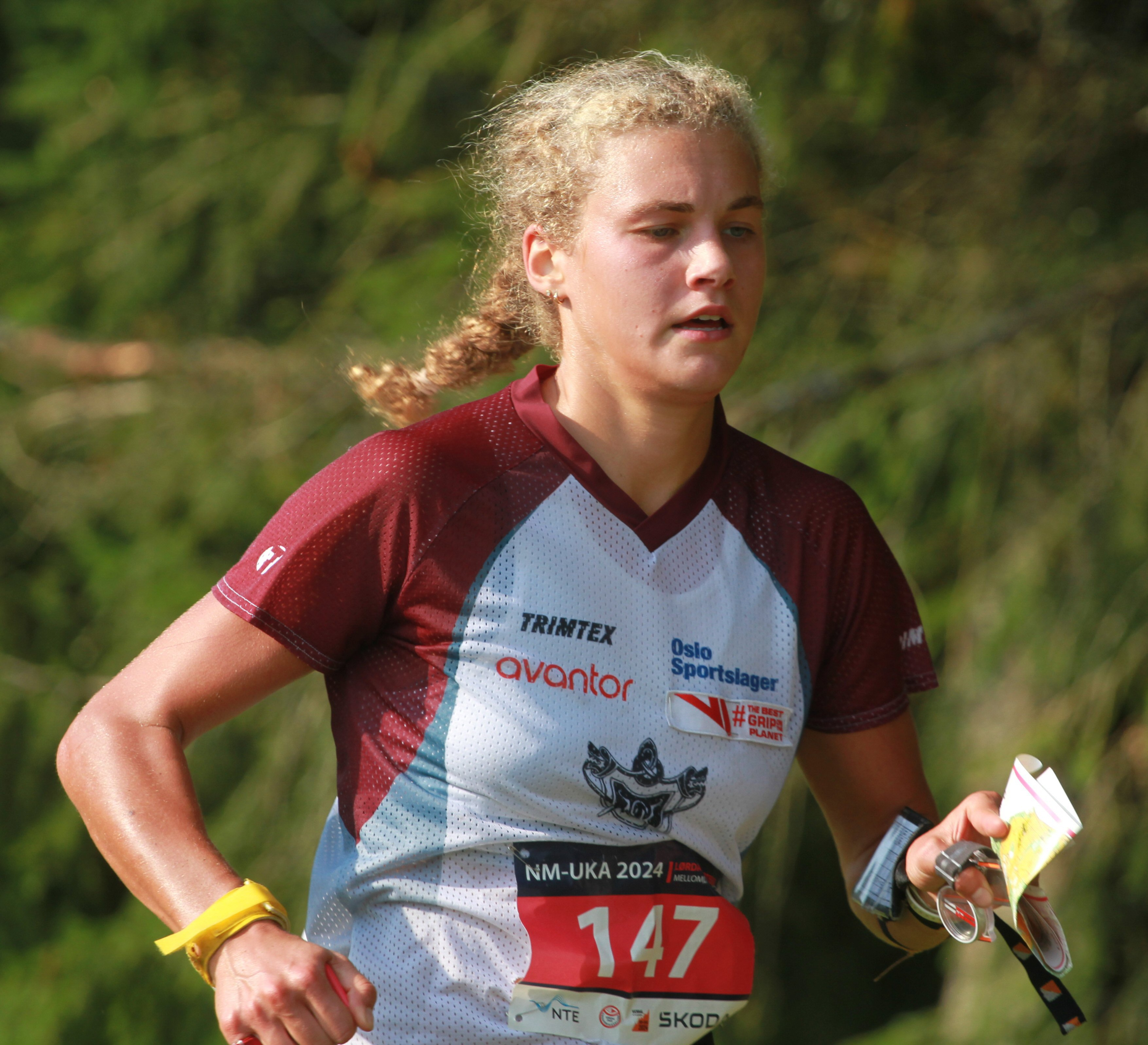

Personal information
- Nationality: Norwegian
- Born: 2003 (age 22–23)

Sport
- Sport: Orienteering
- Club: Nydalens SK; OK Linné
Medal record
Representing Norway
Women's orienteering
World Championships
Silver medal – second place	2025 Finland	Relay
Silver medal – second place	2026 Genova	Sprint
Bronze medal – third place	2026 Genova	Knockout sprint
Bronze medal – third place	2026 Genova	Mixed sprint relay
European Championships
Gold medal – first place	2025 Belgium	Sprint
Silver medal – second place	2025 Belgium	Knockout sprint
Silver medal – second place	2026 Lithuania	Middle
Junior World Championships
Gold medal – first place	2022 Portugal	Mixed sprint relay
Silver medal – second place	2023 Romania	Sprint
Silver medal – second place	2023 Romania	Mixed sprint relay
Bronze medal – third place	2023 Romania	Long
Bronze medal – third place	2023 Romania	Middle
Bronze medal – third place	2023 Romania	Relay

Pia Young Vik (born 2003) is a Norwegian orienteering competitor who runs for the clubs Nydalens SK and OK Linné.

As junior she won both individual medals and relay medals at the Junior World Orienteering Championships. Her achievements as senior include winning national titles in 2024 and 2025, a silver medal in the relay at the World Orienteering Championships, and individual gold and silver medals at the European Orienteering Championships.

== Career ==
=== Junior career ===
Representing Norway at the 2022 Junior World Orienteering Championships, Vik won a gold medal in the mixed sprint relay with the Norwegian team.

She won a silver medal in sprint at the 2023 Junior World Championships, and went on to win several further medals at the 2023 championships.

=== 2024 ===
As senior, Vik won the national title in sprint in 2024.

=== 2025 ===
In May 2025, Vik won the national title in knockout sprint.

Vik represented Norway at the 2025 World Orienteering Championships in Finland, where she won a silver medal in the relay with the Norwegian team, along with Marie Olaussen and Andrine Benjaminsen. She was running the first leg, and finished her leg in the lead, and Norway finally placed second behind Sweden.

In August 2025 she won a silver medal in knockout-sprint at the European Orienteering Championships in Belgium, behind Cecile Calandry from France, and ahead of Simona Aebersold. She followed up winning the gold medal in individual sprint in Lier two days later, three seconds ahead of Hanna Lundberg. This was her first major individual international title. According to the post analysis, she lost a few seconds to the lead from an unfavorable route choice to the second control, and later surpassed until then leading Aebersold on the 11th leg, and Lundgren on the 16th leg.

In September 2025 she won another national title, by winning the middle distance ahead of Anne Margrethe Hausken Nordberg. This was her first national title in forest disciplines, and also earned her the first Kongepokal trophy.

=== 2026 ===
In July 2026 she won a silver medal in individual sprint at the 2026 World Orienteering Championships in Genova, behind Simona Aebersold. She won a bronze medal in the knockout sprint, behind Tereza Rauturier and Karolin Ohlsson. She also won a bronze medal in the mixed sprint relay, along with Victoria Hæstad Bjørnstad, Eirik Langedal Breivik, and Kasper Fosser.

At the European Orienteering Championships in Lithuania in September 2026, Vik won a silver medal in the middle distance, behind Hanna Lundberg.
