= Tomáš Křivda =

Czech orienteering competitor

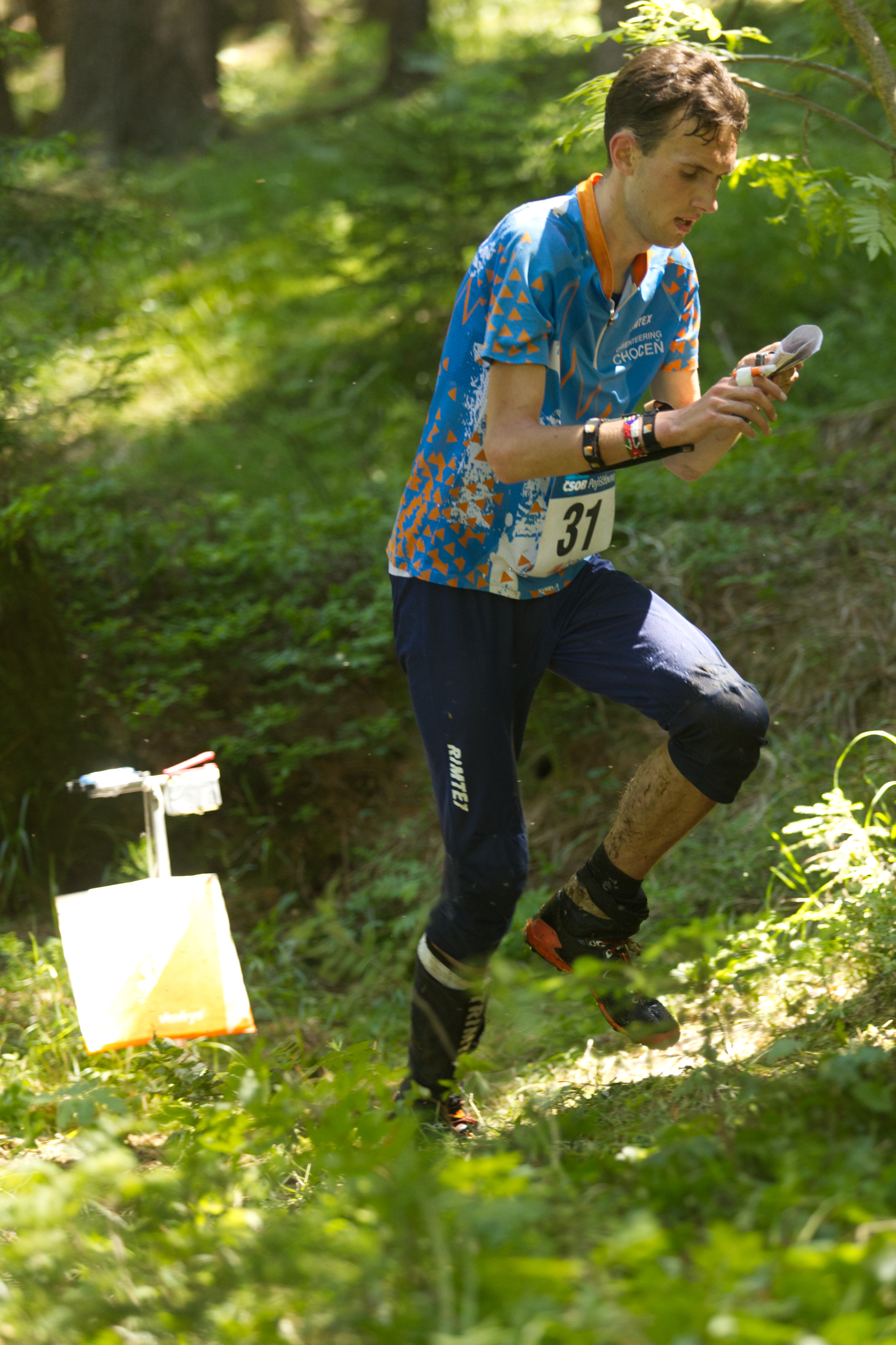

Personal information
- Nationality: Czech
- Born: 15 September 1999 (age 26) Opočno, Czech Republic

Sport
- Sport: Orienteering
- Club: Kalevan Rast; KOB Chocen
Medal record
Representing Czech Republic
Men's orienteering
World Games
Silver medal – second place	2025 Chengdu	Sprint
Bronze medal – third place	2022 Birmingham	Sprint
Bronze medal – third place	2025 Chengdu	Mixed sprint relay
Junior World Championships
Bronze medal – third place	2018 Kecskemét	Relay

Tomáš Křivda (born 15 September 1999) is a Czech orienteering competitor.

== Career ==
Křivda was born in Opočno on 15 September 1999. He represents the clubs Kalevan Rast and KOB Choceň.

He won a bronze in the sprint at the 2022 World Games, behind Tim Robertson and Martin Regborn, and captured the bronze three seconds ahead of Kasper Fosser.

He placed fourth in the long distance at the 2023 World Orienteering Championships.

He placed fourth in the middle distance at the 2024 European Orienteering Championships in Hungary.
