= Albin Ridefelt =

Swedish orienteer (born 1991)

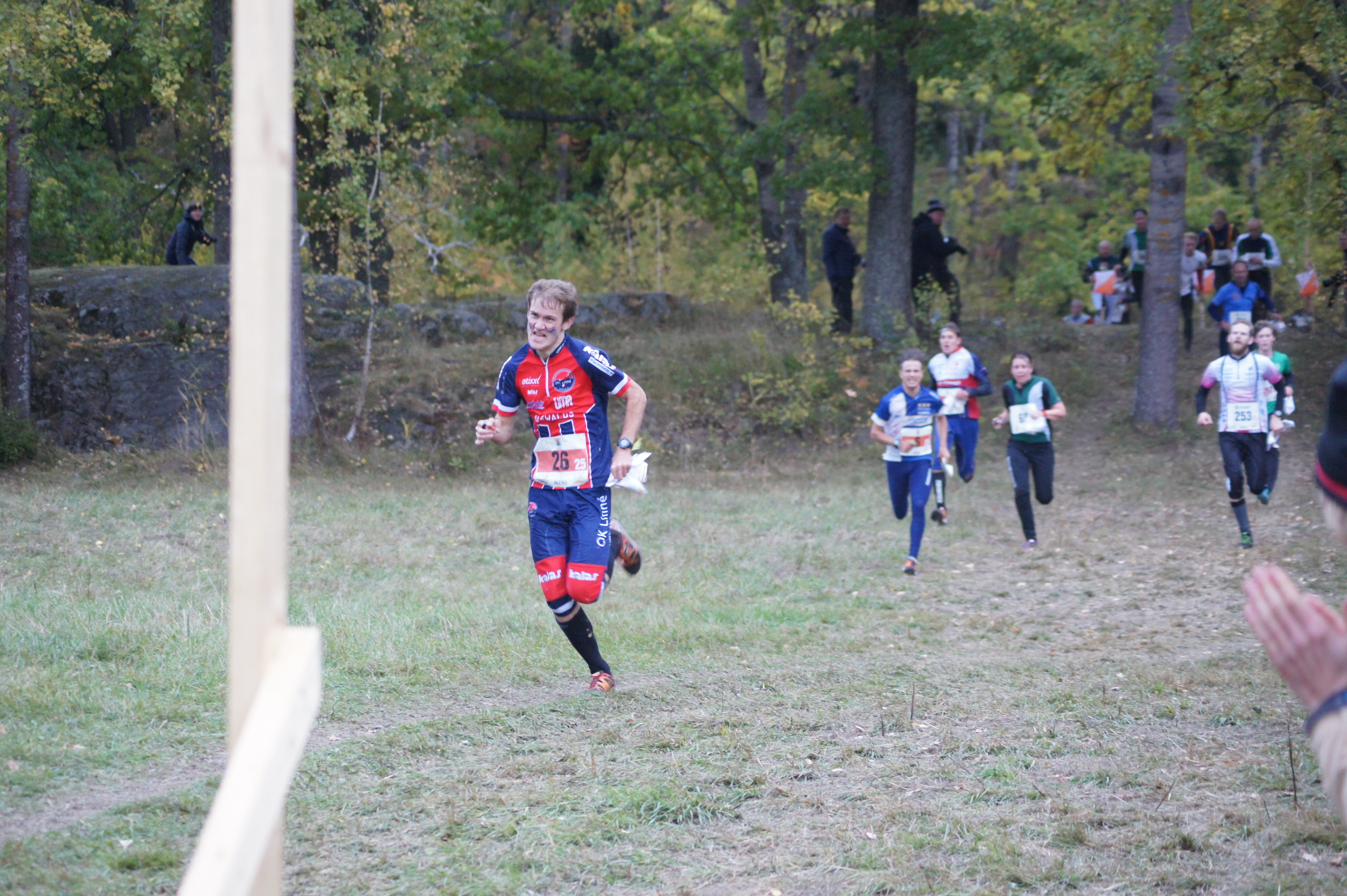

Personal information
- Nationality: Swedish
- Born: November 23, 1991 (age 34)

Sport
- Sport: Orienteering
- Club: OK Linné
Medal record
Representing Sweden
Men's orienteering
World Championships
Gold medal – first place	2021 Doksy	Relay
Bronze medal – third place	2023 Flims-Laax	Relay
European Championships
Gold medal – first place	2022 Rakvere	Middle distance
Silver medal – second place	2024 Mór	Relay
Bronze medal – third place	2024 Mór	Middle distance
Junior World Championships
Gold medal – first place	2009 Primiero	Relay
Silver medal – second place	2011 Wejherowo	Relay

Albin Ridefelt (born 23 November 1991) is a Swedish orienteering competitor from Uppsala, who runs for the club OK Linné.

As a child he did many different sports, but settled on orienteering when he choose to go to the orienteering high school in Sandviken, where he learned a lot about both the sport and life in general. After high school he returned to Uppsala to study medicine at the university. Alongside his studies, he invested more and more time into his training. This resulted in his debut with the Swedish National Team at the 2016 World Orienteering Championships, where he placed 12th in the middle distance.

He represented Sweden at the 2021 World Orienteering Championships in the Czech Republic, where he placed 12th in the middle distance. He won a gold medal in the men's relay with the Swedish team, along with William Lind and Gustav Bergman.

At the 2022 European Orienteering Championships he won a gold medal in the men's middle distance.

At the 2023 World Orienteering Championships he won a bronze medal in the men's relay with the Swedish team, along with Gustav Bergman and Emil Svensk. In the individual middle distance race he placed 4th.

He won a bronze medal in the middle distance at the 2024 European Orienteering Championships in Hungary, behind Eirik Langedal Breivik and Kasper Fosser. He won a silver in the men's relay with the Swedish, along with Viktor Svensk and Emil Svensk.

He retired from the Swedish national team after failing to qualify to the 2025 World Orienteering Championships, which was held in Finland. The final team selection were made based on the World Cup results in Idre, Sweden, where he placed 16th, but only as the 7th best Swedish runner.

Albin was competing for OK Linné since his childhood. He was a key part in many success achieved by the club's relay teams. Most memorably he run the anchor leg in 2022 at Tiomila, when OK Linné won. He was also part of the club's winning team at 25Manna in 2023 and 2024. In 2023 he also placed 2nd with OK Linné at Jukola, which is the biggest orienteering relay in the world.
