= Hanna Lundberg =

Swedish orienteering competitor

Personal information
- Nationality: Swedish
- Born: 16 July 2002 (age 24)

Sport
- Sport: Orienteering, ski orienteering
- Club: OK Renen
Medal record
Representing Sweden
Women's orienteering
World Orienteering Championships
Gold medal – first place	2023 Flims-Laax	Relay
Bronze medal – third place	2023 Flims-Laax	Middle
Bronze medal – third place	2025 Kuopio	Middle
European Championships
Silver medal – second place	2025 Belgium	Sprint
Bronze medal – third place	2025 Belgium	Sprint relay
World Cup
Bronze medal – third place	2021	WC Overall
Junior World Championships
Gold medal – first place	2022 Aguiar da Beira	Middle
Gold medal – first place	2022 Aguiar da Beira	Relay
Gold medal – first place	2022 Aguiar da Beira	Long
Gold medal – first place	2021 Kocaeli	Middle
Gold medal – first place	2021 Kocaeli	Relay
Silver medal – second place	2021 Kocaeli	Sprint
Women's ski orienteering
Junior World Championships
Gold medal – first place	2021 Estonia	Sprint
Gold medal – first place	2021 Estonia	Long
Gold medal – first place	2021 Estonia	Middle
Silver medal – second place	2021 Estonia	Relay

Hanna Lundberg (born 16 July 2002) is a Swedish orienteering competitor who represents the club OK Renen.

== Career ==
=== Orienteering ===
In 2021 Lundberg won a gold medal in the middle distance at the Junior World Orienteering Championships in Turkey, as well as being part of the Swedish winning team in the relay, where she ran the last leg, and winning a silver medal in sprint, five seconds behind the winner.

In 2022 Lundberg won three gold medals. In the middle distance, in the relay, where she ran the third leg in the Swedish winning team, and in the long distance

Competing at the 2021 European Orienteering Championships, she placed 8th in the sprint, and reached the semifinal in the knockout sprint.

At her first participation in the World Orienteering Championships 2023 she won a bronze medal in the middle distance, and a gold medal in the relay as start runner for the Swedish winning team.

At the European Orienteering Championships in Belgium in August 2025, Lundberg won a bronze medal in the mixed sprint relay with the Swedish team. She later won a silver medal in individual sprint at the same championships, in Lier, three seconds behind Pia Young Vik.

In July 2026 she placed fifth in individual sprint at the 2026 World Orienteering Championships in Genova.

=== Ski orienteering ===
In ski orienteering, Lundberg won three gold medals at the 2021 Junior World Ski Orienteering Championships, in sprint, long and middle distances, in addition to a silver medal in the relay.
