= Marie Olaussen =

Norwegian orienteering competitor

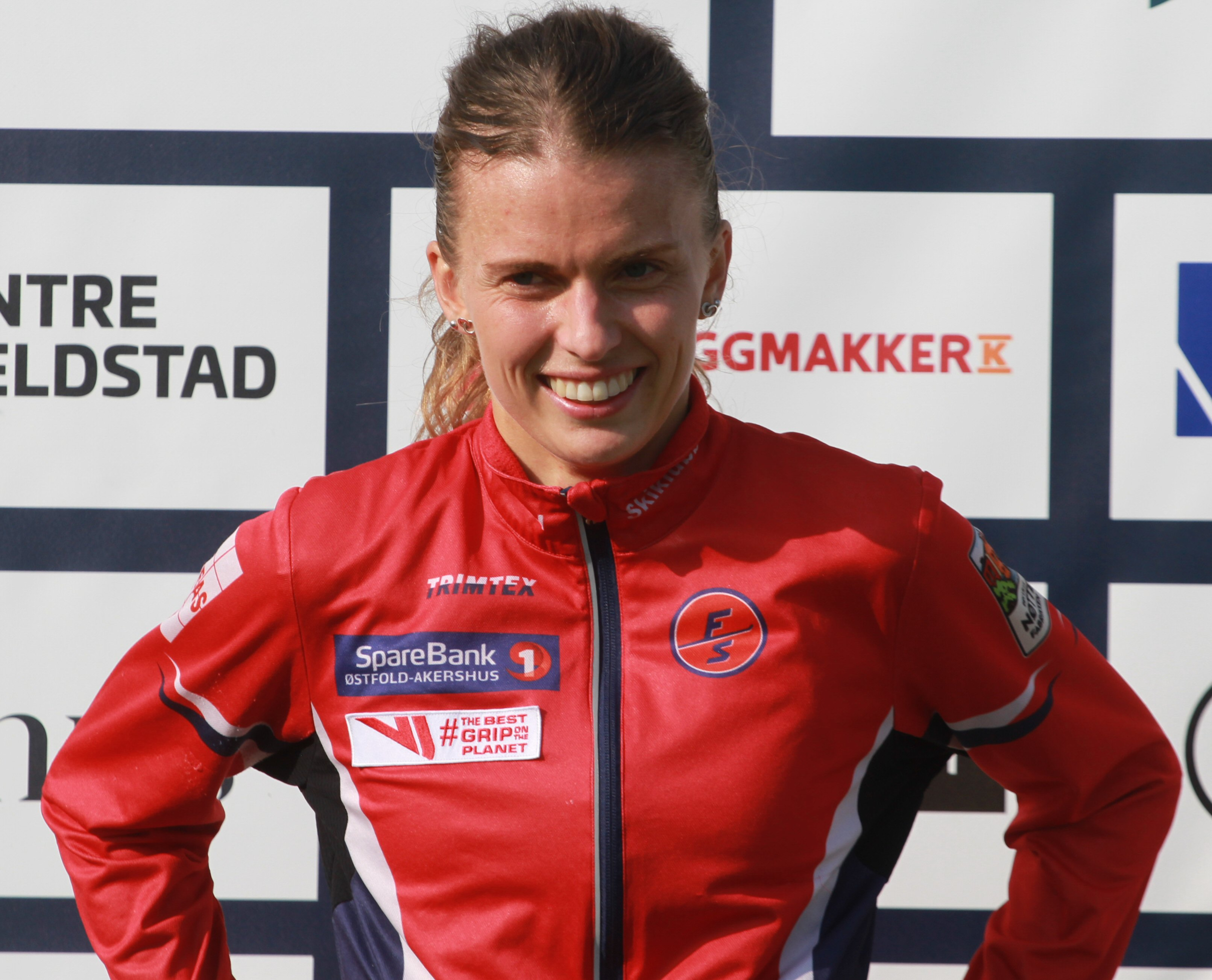

Personal information
- Nationality: Norwegian
- Born: 1997 (age 28–29)

Sport
- Sport: Orienteering
- Club: Fredrikstad SK
Medal record
Representing Norway
Women's orienteering
World Championships
Silver medal – second place	2025 Kuopio	Relay
Bronze medal – third place	2021 Doksy	Relay
Bronze medal – third place	2023 Grisons	Relay
European Championships
Silver medal – second place	2024 Mór	Relay
Junior World Championships
Bronze medal – third place	2015 Rauland	Relay
Bronze medal – third place	2017 Tampere	Relay

Marie Olaussen (born 1997) is a Norwegian orienteering competitor who runs for the club Fredrikstad SK.

== Biography ==
Olaussen represented Norway at the 2021 World Orienteering Championships in the Czech Republic, where she placed 11th in the middle distance. She won a bronze medal in the relay with the Norwegian team, along with Kamilla Steiwer and Andrine Benjaminsen.

She placed eighth in the long distance at the 2023 World Orienteering Championships, and won a bronze medal in the relay with the Norwegian team.

She placed seventh in the middle distance at the 2024 European Orienteering Championships in Hungary. Olaussen was running the second leg in the relay at the 2024 European Championships, winning silver medal for Norway along with Kamilla Steiwer and Andrine Benjaminsen.

Olaussen represented Norway at the 2025 World Orienteering Championships in Finland, where she won a silver medal in the relay with the Norwegian team, along with Pia Young Vik and Andrine Benjaminsen.
