= Yannick Michiels =

Belgian orienteer

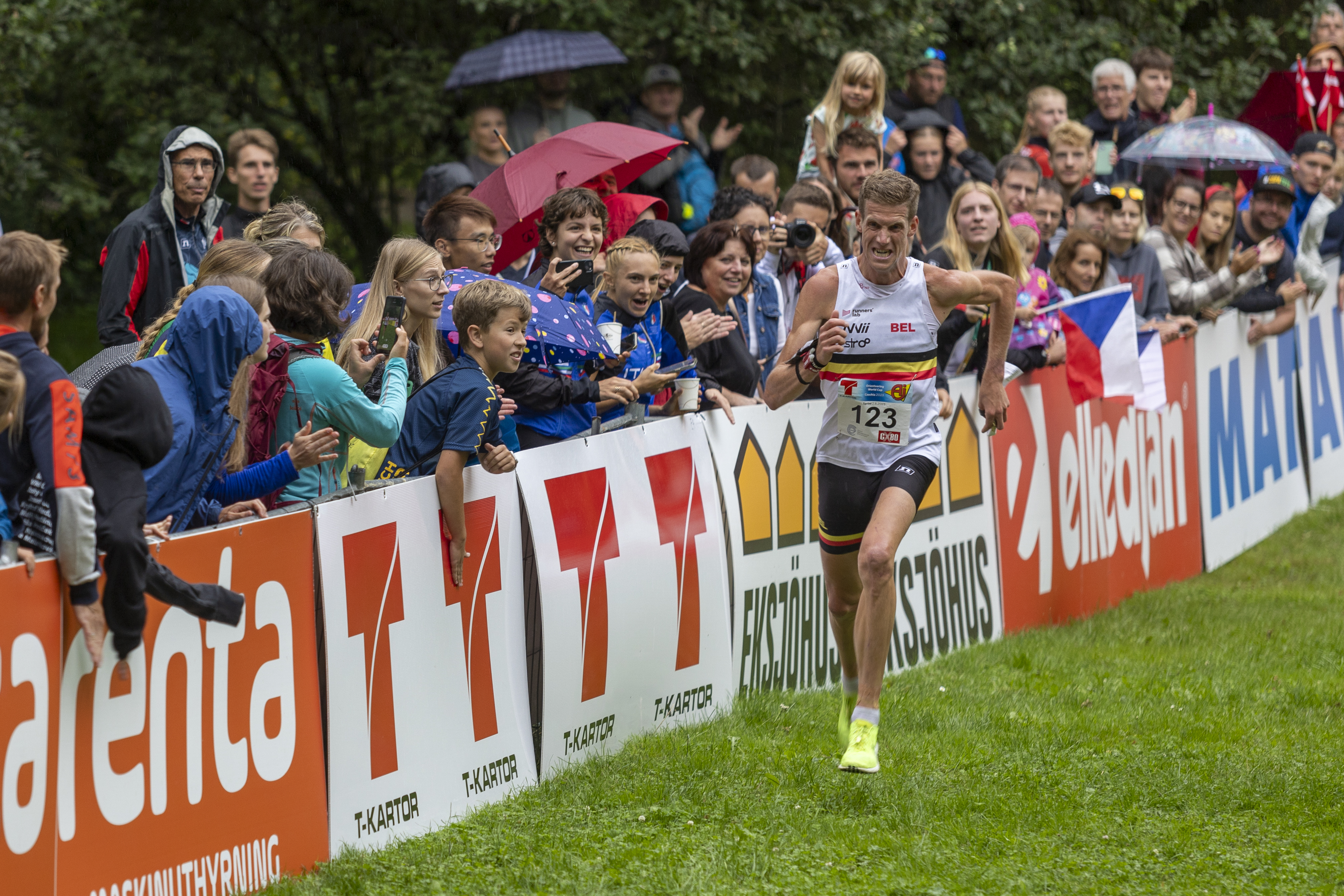

Personal information
- Born: 29 July 1991 (age 34)

Sport
- Sport: Orienteering
- Club: Antwerp Orienteers; Turun Metsankavijat
Medal record
Men's orienteering
Representing Belgium
World Games
Gold medal – first place	2025 Chengdu	Sprint
Silver medal – second place	2017 Wrocław	Sprint
World Championships
Bronze medal – third place	2022 Triangle Region	Sprint
European Championships
Silver medal – second place	2021 Neuchâtel	Sprint

Yannick Michiels (born 29 July 1991) is a Belgian orienteer. He is the first Belgian orienteer to receive a medal at the World Orienteering Championships, receiving a bronze medal in the sprint discipline at the 2022 World Orienteering Championships in Denmark.

== Orienteering ==
He represented Belgium at the 2017 World Games in Poland, where he won a silver medal in the sprint distance.

Michiels competed at the 2012, 2013, 2014 (7th in sprint), 2015 (5th in sprint) and 2017 World Orienteering Championships. In 2021, he became the first Belgian to receive a medal in the European Orienteering Championships.

In 2022, Michiels won Belgium's first medal at the World Orienteering Championships. In the sprint final, held in Vejle, Michiels won the bronze medal, coming behind Kasper Harlem Fosser and Gustav Bergman. Originally, Michiels placed fourth, but the runner who finished in third place (Kris Jones) was disqualified, giving Michiels the bronze medal.

At the 2025 World Games, held in Chengdu, Michiels won the Sprint competition, receiving Belgium's third gold medal at the games.

== Athletics ==
Michiels has also competed for Belgium in Athletics, taking 59th place at the 2015 European Cross Country Championships in France.

== Personal life ==
Michiels is from Mol, Belgium.
