= Topi Syrjäläinen =

Finnish orienteer

Personal information
- Born: 1997 (age 28–29)

Sport
- Sport: Orienteering
Medal record
Representing Finland
Men's orienteering
World Championships
Silver medal – second place	2023 Grisons	Relay

Topi Syrjäläinen (born 1997) is an orienteering competitor who runs for Helsingin Suunnistajat and the Finnish national team.

== Career ==
At the World Orienteering Championships, Syrjäläinen's best achievement in individual distances is 25th place in the middle distance at the 2019 World Orienteering Championships in Norway. At the 2023 World Orienteering Championships in Switzerland, he won silver with the Finnish relay team.

At the Junior World Orienteering Championships, his best finishes in the individual distance are 19th place in both the sprint and middle distance, and in 2017 Syrjäläinen was also part of Finland's fourth-placed relay team. In the Orienteering World Cup, Syrjäläinen's best finish is 10th place in the long-distance race in 2021.

Syrjäläinen was part of the third-placed team of Helsingin Suunnistajat in the 2021 Jukola Relay. His brother Arttu was also in the team.
