= Evely Kaasiku =

Estonian orienteer (born 1993)

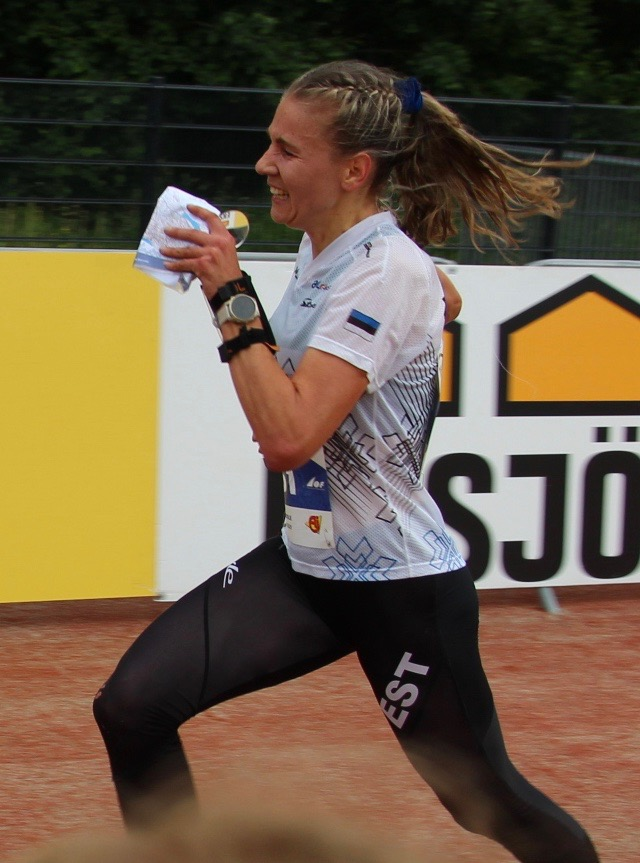
- Kaasiku in 2025

Personal information
- Born: 13 September 1993 (age 32) Paide, Estonia

Sport
- Sport: Orienteering
- Club: Helsingin Suunnistajat; JOKA
Medal record
Representing Estonia
Women's orienteering
European Championships
Silver medal – second place	2022 Rakvere	Middle

Evely Kaasiku (born 13 September 1993) is an Estonian orienteering competitor who represents the clubs Helsingin Suunnistajat and JOKA.

At the European Orienteering Championships 2022 she won a silver medal in the middle distance.

She represented Estonia at the 2023 World Orienteering Championships in Flims and Laax, Switzerland. Qualifying for the final, she placed 10th in the middle distance.
