= Anton Johansson (orienteer) =

Swedish orienteer (born 1994)

Personal information
- Born: 1994 (age 31–32)

Sport
- Sport: Orienteering
- Club: OK Orion
Medal record
Representing Sweden
Men's orienteering
World Championships
| Bronze medal – third place | 2025 Kuopio | Middle |
European Championships
| Silver medal – second place | 2022 Rakvere | Middle |
Junior World Championships
| Gold medal – first place | 2014 Borovets | Long |
| Gold medal – first place | 2014 Borovets | Relay |

Anton Johansson (born 1994) is a Swedish orienteering competitor who competes internationally. He was awarded the bronze medal in the middle distance at the 2025 World Orienteering Championships.

Johansson won the Junior World Orienteering Championships in 2014 in Bulgaria in both the long distance and the relay.

Johansson was selected for the Swedish team for the Orienteering World Cup in 2016, 2018, 2021 and 2022. He won a silver medal in the European Orienteering Championships in 2022, but only made his senior debut in the World Orienteering Championships in 2023. In 2025, Johansson won the bronze in the middle distance at the 2025 World Orienteering Championships in Finland, defeating defending champion Matthias Kyburz by one second at the finish.

Martin is the son of Martin Johansson, who won a bronze medal in the middle distance at the 1991 World Orienteering Championships and 1993 World Orienteering Championships.
