= Dancesport at the 2025 World Games =

- Venue: Chengbei Gymnasium
- Dates: 8–9 August 2025 (Latin & Standard); 16–17 August 2025 (Breaking)
- No. of events: 4
- Competitors: 128 from 29 nations

The dancesport competition at the 2025 World Games took place from 8 to 17 August 2025, in Chengdu in China, at the Chengbei Gymnasium. The competition included four events (two for breaking, one for standard and one for Latin). The Rock'n'Roll event, held during the previous games, was dropped.

== Qualification ==
A total of 128 athletes qualified for the dancesport events. Sixteen men and sixteen women qualified for the breaking events. 48 couples qualified for the dancing disciplines (24 couples for Latin and 24 for standard).

== Participating nations ==
- Australia (1)
- Belgium (1)
- Brazil (3)
- Chile (1)
- China (20)
- Chinese Taipei (1)
- Czech Republic (4)
- Denmark (2)
- Estonia (4)
- France (3)
- Germany (8)
- Hong Kong (4)
- Hungary (2)
- Individual Neutral Athletes (2)
- Israel (8)
- Italy (12)
- Japan (6)
- Latvia (6)
- Lithuania (3)
- Netherlands (1)
- Poland (7)
- Portugal (1)
- South Korea (2)
- Moldova (2)
- Romania (8)
- Slovenia (2)
- Spain (3)
- Ukraine (7)
- United States (4)

== Medal table ==
* Host nation (China)

Rank	Nation	Gold	Silver	Bronze	Total
1	China*	2	1	0	3
2	Germany	1	0	0	1
2	Moldova	1	0	0	1
4	Japan	0	1	1	2
5	France	0	1	0	1
5	Romania	0	1	0	1
7	Lithuania	0	0	1	1
7	Poland	0	0	1	1
7	Spain	0	0	1	1
Totals (9 entries)		4	4	4	12

== Medalists ==
Event	Gold	Silver	Bronze
Standard	Moldova; Alexey Glukhov; Anastasia Glazunova	Romania; Rareș Cojoc; Andreea Matei	Poland; Dariusz Myćka; Madara Freiberga
Latin	Germany; Khrystyna Moshenska; Marius Balan	France; Elena Salikhova; Charles Schmitt	Spain; Diandra Illes; Guillem Pascual
B-Boys	Lithe-ing; China	Issin; Japan	Shigekix; Japan
B-Girls	Royal; China	671; China	Nicka; Lithuania
