= 2023 World Orienteering Championships =

Orienteering event in Switzerland

- Location: Flims/Laax, Switzerland
- Dates: 11–16 July 2023

The 2023 World Orienteering Championships were held from 11 to 16 July 2023 in Flims/Laax in the Canton of the Grisons (German: Graubünden), Switzerland.

The championships consisted of six forest competitions: middle distance, long distance and relay, for women and men, respectively. A total of 18 medals were shared among five nations. The host nation Switzerland won three of the six gold medals, with victories in the women's long distance, men's middle distance, and men's relay. Sweden won two gold medals, winning the women's relay and the women's middle distance. Norway won one gold medal, in the men's long distance. Finland and Austria were also among the medal winners.

== Schedule ==
| Date | Event | Comment |
|---|---|---|
| 12 July | Middle – Qualification | |
| 13 July | Long distance | |
| 14 July | Rest day | |
| 15 July | Middle distance – Final | |
| 16 July | Relay | |

== Medal summary ==
=== Men ===
| Event | Gold | | Silver | | Bronze | |
|---|---|---|---|---|---|---|
| Middle distance | Matthias Kyburz; Switzerland | 38:19 | Joey Hadorn; Switzerland | 40:19 | Jannis Bonek; Austria | 40:26 |
| Long distance | Kasper Fosser; Norway | 1:33:06 | Matthias Kyburz; Switzerland | 1:33:57 | Olli Ojanaho; Finland | 1:37:37 |
| Relay | Switzerland; Daniel Hubmann; Joey Hadorn; Matthias Kyburz | 1:57:16 | Finland; Topi Syrjäläinen; Olli Ojanaho; Miika Kirmula | 1:57:59 | Sweden; Albin Ridefelt; Gustav Bergman; Emil Svensk | 1:58:13 |

=== Women ===
| Event | Gold | | Silver | | Bronze | |
|---|---|---|---|---|---|---|
| Middle distance | Tove Alexandersson; Sweden | 37:26 | Natalia Gemperle; Switzerland | 39:44 | Hanna Lundberg; Sweden | 40:00 |
| Long distance | Simona Aebersold; Switzerland | 1:21:43 | Tove Alexandersson; Sweden | 1:22:14 | Andrine Benjaminsen; Norway | 1:29:03 |
| Relay | Sweden; Hanna Lundberg; Sara Hagström; Tove Alexandersson | 1:47:26 | Switzerland; Elena Roos; Natalia Gemperle; Simona Aebersold | 1:51:54 | Norway; Marianne Andersen; Marie Olaussen; Andrine Benjaminsen | 1:57:25 |

=== Medal table ===
* Host nation (Switzerland)

| Rank | Nation | Gold | Silver | Bronze | Total |
|---|---|---|---|---|---|
| 1 | Switzerland* | 3 | 4 | 0 | 7 |
| 2 | Sweden | 2 | 1 | 2 | 5 |
| 3 | Norway | 1 | 0 | 2 | 3 |
| 4 | Finland | 0 | 1 | 1 | 2 |
| 5 | Austria | 0 | 0 | 1 | 1 |
| Totals (5 entries) | | 6 | 6 | 6 | 18 |

== Results ==
=== Women's long distance ===
WOC 2023 – Long – Women (11.0 km, 23 controls)
| Rank | Competitor | Nation | Time |
|---|---|---|---|
| 1st place, gold medalist(s) | Simona Aebersold | Switzerland | 1:21:43 |
| 2nd place, silver medalist(s) | Tove Alexandersson | Sweden | 1:22:14 |
| 3rd place, bronze medalist(s) | Andrine Benjaminsen | Norway | 1:29:03 |
| 4 | Natalia Gemperle | Switzerland | 1:29:09 |
| 5 | Sara Hagström | Sweden | 1:29:23 |
| 6 | Elena Roos | Switzerland | 1:30:09 |
| 7 | Megan Carter Davies | Great Britain | 1:30:50 |
| 8 | Marie Olaussen | Norway | 1:31:47 |
| 9 | Venla Harju | Finland | 1:33:13 |
| 10 | Marianne Andersen | Norway | 1:36:31 |

=== Men's long distance ===
WOC 2023 – Long – Men (14.0 km, 35 controls)
| Rank | Competitor | Nation | Time |
|---|---|---|---|
| 1st place, gold medalist(s) | Kasper Fosser | Norway | 1:33:06 |
| 2nd place, silver medalist(s) | Matthias Kyburz | Switzerland | 1:33:57 |
| 3rd place, bronze medalist(s) | Olli Ojanaho | Finland | 1:37:37 |
| 4 | Emil Svensk | Sweden | 1:37:51 |
| 4 | Tomas Krivda | Czech Republic | 1:37:51 |
| 6 | Daniel Hubmann | Switzerland | 1:38:30 |
| 7 | Joey Hadorn | Switzerland | 1:38:33 |
| 8 | Ruslan Glibov | Ukraine | 1:39:53 |
| 9 | Miika Kirmula | Finland | 1:41:02 |
| 10 | Milos Nykodym | Czech Republic | 1:42:35 |

=== Women's middle distance ===
WOC 2023 – Middle – Women (4.8 km)
| Rank | Competitor | Nation | Time |
|---|---|---|---|
| 1st place, gold medalist(s) | Tove Alexandersson | Sweden | 37:26 |
| 2nd place, silver medalist(s) | Natalia Gemperle | Switzerland | 39:44 |
| 3rd place, bronze medalist(s) | Hanna Lundberg | Sweden | 40:00 |
| 4 | Ane Dyrkorn | Norway | 41:49 |
| 5 | Andrine Benjaminsen | Norway | 42:01 |
| 6 | Venla Harju | Finland | 43:11 |
| 7 | Sandra Grosberga | Latvia | 43:14 |
| 8 | Tereza Janošíková | Czech Republic | 43:46 |
| 9 | Sara Hagström | Sweden | 44:11 |
| 10 | Evely Kaasiku | Estonia | 44:48 |

=== Men's middle distance ===
WOC 2023 – Middle – Men(5.9 km)
| Rank | Competitor | Nation | Time |
|---|---|---|---|
| 1st place, gold medalist(s) | Matthias Kyburz | Switzerland | 38:19 |
| 2nd place, silver medalist(s) | Joey Hadorn | Switzerland | 40:19 |
| 3rd place, bronze medalist(s) | Jannis Bonek | Austria | 40:26 |
| 4 | Albin Ridefelt | Sweden | 40:51 |
| 5 | Gustav Bergman | Sweden | 40:59 |
| 6 | Olli Ojanaho | Finland | 41:03 |
| 7 | Kasper Harlem Fosser | Norway | 41:43 |
| 8 | Eskil Kinneberg | Norway | 41:50 |
| 9 | Lucas Basset | France | 41:54 |
| 10 | Emil Svensk | Sweden | 42:16 |
