= Artiom Livadari =

Moldovan Muay Thau fighter (born 2001)

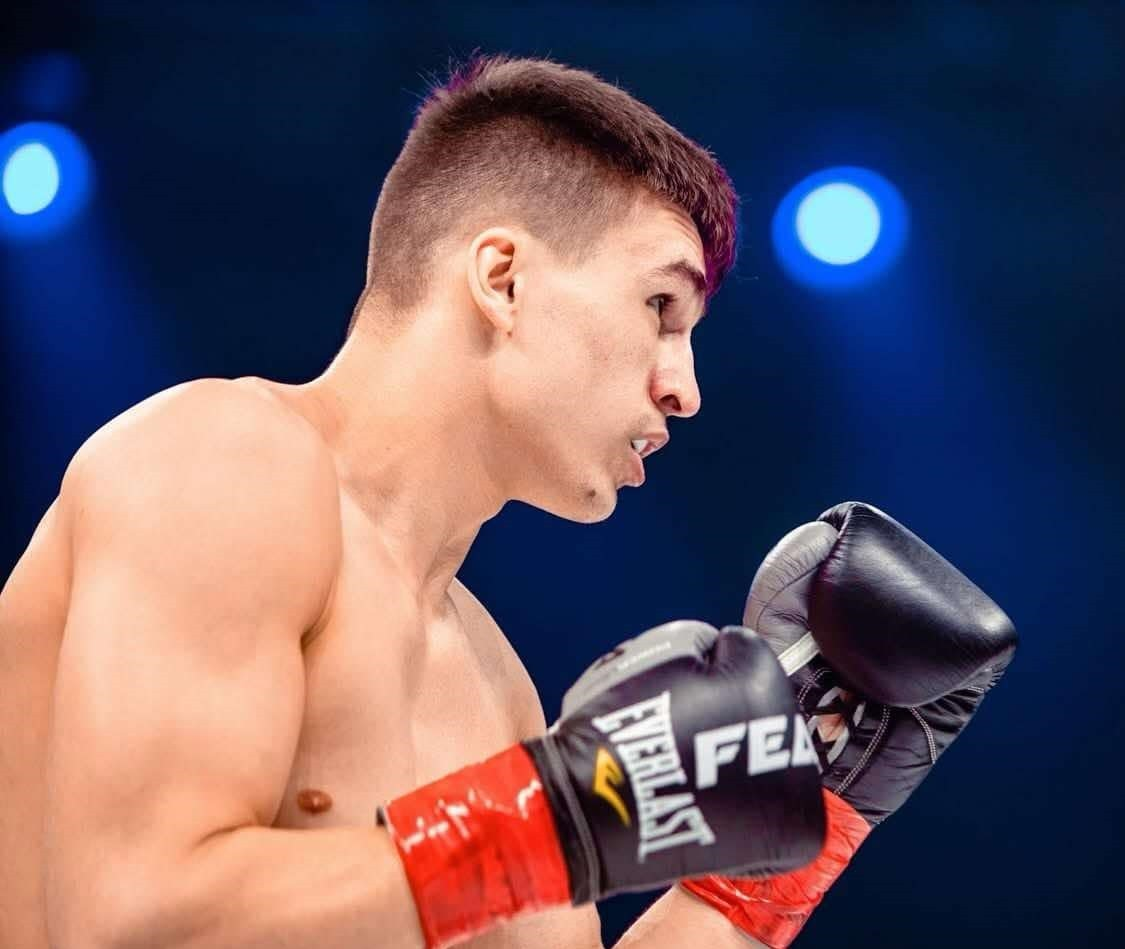
- Born: December 6, 2001 (age 24); Făurești, Moldova
- Native name: Artiom Livădari
- Height: 1.87 m (6 ft 1 1/2 in)
- Weight: 80 kg (180 lb; 13 st)
- Style: Muay Thai, Kickboxing
- Stance: Orthodox
- Fighting out of: Chișinău, Moldova
- Team: Bercut Fight Club
- Trainer: Andrei Grosu, Vladimir Dima
- Years active: 2019–present

Kickboxing record
- Total: 16
- Wins: 12
- By knockout: 4
- Losses: 4
- By knockout: 1

Artiom Livădari (born December 6, 2001), is a Moldovan-Romanian Muay Thai fighter and kickboxer.

He is the current IFMA World Champion, FEA Welterweight and Middleweight Champion, as well as the 2025 World Games Muay Thai Champion and European Games Champion.

Artiom Livadari became the first athlete from Moldova to qualify for the World Games in Muay Thai, and the first in the country's history to win gold in Muay Thai at both World Games and the European Games.

== Background ==
Artiom Livadari was born in the village of Făurești (part of Ciorescu), Moldova. He is the only child of his parents, Serghei and Natalia Livadari.

Livadari began his athletic journey during his school years, joining the Taekwondo section under the guidance of coach Alexandru Sevastian.

At the age of 16, he transitioned to Muay Thai, initially training a few years with Andrei Grosu at Bercut Fight Club and later with Vlad Dima at the same gym.

During his teenage years, he was also passionate about basketball and considered quitting Muay Thai for this sport. However, advice from his coach, Andrei Grosu, convinced him to continue his career in combat sports.

== Professional career ==
Livadari has a professional record of 10 wins and 3 losses.

He is the FEA Champion in the 77 kg category. On the way to the title Artiom Livadari defeated Unal Alkayis, an experienced fighter from Turkey, by knockout.

Already holding the FEA title at 77 kg, Livadari decided to take on a new challenge by competing in a tournament at 85 kg on March 15, 2025, aiming to win his second FEA belt in a higher weight class. In the semifinals he faced Gasham Mammadov from Azerbaijan winning by TKO. The final fight was against Ali Yuzeir from Bulgaria. It ended with the Yuzeir's victory due to Livadari's injury.

On 29 November 2025, Artiom Livadari faced fellow Moldovan fighter Maxim Zaplitnii. After five rounds, Livadari secured the victory and became FEA Middleweight Champion.

== Education ==
Artiom Livadari graduated from the Police Academy of the Republic of Moldova and is currently pursuing a master's degree in Economic Law. Additionally, he is a fourth-year student at the University of Physical Education and Sports in Moldova.

== Championships and awards ==
=== Professional ===
- Fighting Entertainment Association
  - 2025 FEA Middleweight (-85 kg) Champion
  - 2024 FEA Welterweight (-77 kg) Champion

=== Amateur ===
- International Federation of Muaythai Associations
  - 2021 IFMA World Championship U23 -81 kg (silver)
  - 2022 FISU World University Cup Combat Sports -81 kg (gold)
  - 2022 IFMA World Championship -81 kg (silver)
  - 2023 IFMA World Championship -81 kg (silver)
  - 2024 IFMA World Championship -81 kg (gold)
- CIS Games
  - 2021 CIS Games U23 -81 kg (bronze)
- European Games
  - 2023 European Games Muay Thai -81 kg (gold)
- World Games
  - 2025 World Games Muay Thai -86 kg (gold)

== Kickboxing and Muay Thai record ==
Professional Muay Thai & Kickboxing record
12 Wins (4 (T)KOs), 4 Losses, 0 Draw
| Date | Result | Opponent | Event | Location | Method | Round | Time |
| 2026-09-05 | Loss | (Spain) Fikri Sabri | Glory 109 | Rotterdam, Netherlands | TKO (Left hook/nose injury) | 2 | 0:36 |
| 2026-06-26 | Win | (Morocco) Nouri de Jager | Colosseum Tournament 50: Romania vs Africa | Suceava, Romania | Decision (Unanimous) | 3 | 3:00 |
| 2026-06-18 | Win | (Brazil) Dengue Silva | FCE 5 | Lisbon, Portugal | Decision (Majority) | 3 | 3:00 |
| 2025-11-29 | Win | (Moldova) Maxim Zaplitnîi | FEA Championship | Chișinău, Moldova | Decision (Unanimous) | 5 | 3:00 |
Wins the FEA Championship Middleweight (-85kg) title.
| 2025-03-15 | Loss | (Bulgaria) Ali Yuzeir | FEA Championship - Middleweight Grand Prix, Final | Chișinău, Moldova | TKO (retirement) | 4 | 0:22 |
| 2025-03-15 | Win | (Azerbaijan) Gasham Mammadov | FEA Championship - Middleweight Grand Prix, Semifinals | Chișinău, Moldova | KO (Punch) | 2 | 0:59 |
| 2024-03-30 | Win | (Turkey) Ünal Alkayış | FEA Championship : Legacy | Ciorescu, Moldova | KO (Knee to the body) | 2 | 0:10 |
Wins the vacant FEA Championship Welterweight (-77kg) title.
| 2023-09-23 | Loss | (Bulgaria) Ali Yuzeir | FEA Championship : Equinox | Chișinău, Moldova | Decision | 3 | 3:00 |
| 2023-04-08 | Win | (Turkey) Mehmet Ali Meriç | FEA Championship : Take Off - Welterweight Contender Tournament, Final | Ciorescu, Moldova | TKO (Punches) | 3 | 0:43 |
| 2023-04-08 | Win | (Romania) Anghel Cardoș | FEA Championship : Take Off - Welterweight Contender Tournament, Semifinals | Ciorescu, Moldova | Ext.R Decision (Unanimous) | 4 | 3:00 |
| 2022-12-17 | Loss | (Turkey) Mehmet Ali Meriç | FEA Championship : Full Drive | Ciorescu, Moldova | Decision (Split) | 3 | 3:00 |
| 2022-09-17 | Win | (Turkey) Fatih Erman | FEA Championship | Moldova | TKO | 1 | 2:02 |
| 2020-12-23 | Win | (Belarus) Robert Ismail | BFC 65 | Minsk, Belarus | Decision | 3 | 3:00 |
| 2019-12-07 | Win | (Belarus) Dzmitry Zarubin | FEA Championship: Keep Grinding 2 | Chișinău, Moldova | Decision (Unanimous) | 3 | 3:00 |
| 2019-08-26 | Win | (Ukraine) Sergey Drozd | FEA Championship: Keep Grinding 1 | Odesa, Ukraine | Decision (Unanimous) | 3 | 3:00 |
| 2019-06-22 | Win | (Moldova) Daniel Baleca | FEA Eagles | Moldova | Decision (Unanimous) | 3 | 3:00 |
Legend: Win Loss Draw/No contest Notes

Amateur Muay Thai & Kickboxing record
| Date | Result | Opponent | Event | Location | Method | Round | Time |
|---|---|---|---|---|---|---|---|
| 2025-08-10 | Win | (United States) Aaron Ortiz | 2025 World Games - Muay Thai Tournament, Final | Chengdu, China | Decision (30:27) | 3 | 3:00 |
Wins the 2025 World Games Muay Thai -86kg Gold Medal.
| 2025-08-09 | Win | (China) Zhang Chengcheng | 2025 World Games - Muay Thai Tournament, Semifinals | Chengdu, China | Decision (30:27) | 3 | 3:00 |
| 2025-08-08 | Win | (Croatia) Vito Košar | 2025 World Games - Muay Thai Tournament, Semifinals | Chengdu, China | Decision (30:27) | 3 | 3:00 |
| 2024-06-09 | Win | (Russia) Daniil Chashin | 2024 IFMA World Championship, Final | Patras, Greece | Decision (29:28) | 3 | 3:00 |
Wins the 2024 IFMA World Championship -81kg Gold Medal.
| 2024-06-07 | Win | (Iraq) Mustafa Al Tekreeti | 2024 IFMA World Championship, Semifinals | Patras, Greece | Decision (29:28) | 3 | 3:00 |
| 2024-06-05 | Win | (United States) Jibril Alim | 2024 IFMA World Championship, Quarterfinals | Patras, Greece | TKO | 1 | |
| 2024-06-02 | Win | (Italy) Nicholas Vasta | 2024 IFMA World Championship, First Round | Patras, Greece | Decision (30:27) | 3 | 3:00 |
| 2023-06-28 | Win | (Ukraine) Yehor Skurikhin | 2023 European Games - Muay Thai Tournament, Final | Myślenice, Poland | Decision (30:27) | 3 | 3:00 |
Wins the 2023 European Games Muay Thai -81kg Gold Medal.
| 2023-06-27 | Win | (Turkey) Enis Yunusoğlu | 2023 European Games - Muay Thai Tournament, Semifinals | Myślenice, Poland | Decision (29:28) | 3 | 3:00 |
| 2023-06-26 | Win | (France) Bilal Bakhouche-Chareuf | 2023 European Games - Muay Thai Tournament, Quarterfinals | Myślenice, Poland | Decision (30:27) | 3 | 3:00 |
| 2023-05-12 | Loss | (Iraq) Mustafa Al Tekreeti | 2023 IFMA World Championship, Final | Bangkok, Thailand | Decision (29:28) | 3 | 3:00 |
Wins the 2023 IFMA World Championship -81kg Silver Medal.
| 2023-05-10 | Win | (Saudi Arabia) Abdulrahman Bajaba | 2023 IFMA World Championship, Semifinals | Bangkok, Thailand | TKO | 2 | |
| 2023-05-08 | Win | (Czech Republic) Ondrej Malina | 2023 IFMA World Championship, Quarterfinals | Bangkok, Thailand | Decision (30:27) | 3 | 3:00 |
| 2023-05-06 | Win | (Mauritius) Veejaye Agathe | 2023 IFMA World Championship, First Round | Bangkok, Thailand | Decision (30:27) | 3 | 3:00 |
| 2022-09-28 | Win | (Ukraine) Artur Struchenkov | 2022 IFMA-FISU Championship, Final | İlkadım, Turkey | Decision (30:27) | 3 | 3:00 |
Wins the 2022 IFMA-FISU Championship -81kg Gold Medal.
| 2022-09-27 | Win | (France) Melvin Saint Pierre | 2022 IFMA-FISU Championship, Semifinals | İlkadım, Turkey | Decision (30:27) | 3 | 3:00 |
| 2022-09-24 | Win | (Kazakhstan) Alexandr Tsarikov | 2022 IFMA-FISU Championship, Quarterfinals | İlkadım, Turkey | Decision (30:27) | 3 | 3:00 |
| 2022-06-04 | Loss | (United Arab Emirates) Ilyass Hbibali | 2022 IFMA World Championship, Final | Abu Dhabi, United Arab Emirates | Decision (30:27) | 3 | 3:00 |
Wins the 2022 IFMA World Championship -81kg Silver Medal.
| 2022-06-02 | Win | (Switzerland) Manuel Rifa | 2022 IFMA World Championship, Semifinals | Abu Dhabi, United Arab Emirates | Decision (30:27) | 3 | 3:00 |
| 2022-05-31 | Win | (Peru) Matteo Celi | 2022 IFMA World Championship, Quarterfinals | Abu Dhabi, United Arab Emirates | Decision (30:27) | 3 | 3:00 |
| 2022-05-29 | Win | (Sweden) Marcus Liljedorff | 2022 IFMA World Championship, First Round | Abu Dhabi, United Arab Emirates | Decision (30:27) | 3 | 3:00 |
| 2022-02-17 | Loss | (Russia) Daniil Chashin | 2022 IFMA European Championship, Quarterfinals | Istanbul, Turkey | Decision (30:26) | 3 | 3:00 |
| 2021-12-11 | Loss | (Russia) Daniil Chashin | 2021 IFMA World Championship, Final | Bangkok, Thailand | Decision (30:27) | 3 | 3:00 |
Wins the 2021 IFMA World Championship U23 -81kg Silver Medal.
| 2021-12-10 | Win | (Hungary) Barnabás Kiss | 2021 IFMA World Championship, Semifinals | Bangkok, Thailand | Decision (30:27) | 3 | 3:00 |
| 2021-12-08 | Win | (Turkey) Hasan Çetİn | 2021 IFMA World Championship, Quarterfinals | Bangkok, Thailand | Decision (29:28) | 3 | 3:00 |
Legend: Win Loss Draw/No contest Notes
