= August Mollén =

Swedish orienteering competitor

Personal information
- Born: 26 August 1999 (age 26) Kimstad

Sport
- Sport: Orienteering
- Club: Ok Denseln
Medal record
Men's orienteering
Representing Sweden
World Games
| Silver medal – second place | 2025 Chengdu | Mixed sprint relay |
World Championships
| Silver medal – second place | 2022 Triangle Region | Knock-out sprint |
World Cup
| Bronze medal – third place | 2022 Borås | Knock-out sprint |
Nordic Student Championship
| Gold medal – first place | 2022 Linköping | Relay |
| Bronze medal – third place | 2022 Linköping | Sprint |

August Mollén (born 26 August 1999) is an orienteering competitor from Sweden. He won a silver medal in the 2022 World Orienteering Championships, coming second in the first ever knock-out sprint event behind Matthias Kyburz. Mollén was just one second behind Kyburz at the finish.

Mollén only completed his first ranking FootO event in 2021, one year before World Orienteering Championships success. In 2022, he came fourth at the Swedish sprint orienteering championships, leading him to be selected for a sprint event at the 2022 Orienteering World Cup on the 28th May, where he came third in the knock-out sprint. Just over a month later, Mollén achieved his first medal at a World Championships event.

Mollén competes for OK Denseln.

Mollén is currently studying Industrial Engineering and Management at Chalmers University of Technology.
