= Jonatan Gustafsson =

Swedish orienteer

Personal information
- Born: 28 December 1999 (age 26)

Sport
- Sport: Orienteering
- Club: KFUM Örebro
Medal record
Representing Sweden
Men's orienteering
World Games
Silver medal – second place	2025 Chengdu	Mixed sprint relay
World Championships
Bronze medal – third place	2022 Fredericia	Sprint
Bronze medal – third place	2024 Edinburgh	Knockout sprint
European Championships
Gold medal – first place	2023 Soave	Sprintrelay
Silver medal – second place	2023 Vicenza	Knock-Out sprint

Jonatan Gustafsson (born 28 December 1999) is a Swedish orienteer.

Gustafsson won a bronze medal in sprint at the 2022 World Orienteering Championships held in Fredericia, Denmark. The same year he won a gold medal in sprint and a silver medel in Sprintrelay at the World University Orienteering Championships. During the 2023 European Championships in Verona, Italy he won a gold medal in sprintrelay, and a silver medal in Knock-out sprint

Competing at the 2024 World Orienteering Championships in Edinburgh, Gustafsson won a bronze medal in the knockout sprint.
