= Zoltán Bujdosó =

Hungarian orienteer

Personal information
- Born: 2002 (age 23–24)

Sport
- Sport: Orienteering
Medal record
Representing Hungary
Men's orienteering
World Games
Bronze medal – third place	2025 Chengdu	Sprint
Junior World Championships
Gold medal – first place	2022 Aguiar da Beira	Middle
Silver medal – second place	2022 Aguiar da Beira	Sprint Relay
Silver medal – second place	2021 Kocaeli	Relay

Zoltán Bujdosó (born 2002) is an orienteering competitor who runs for the Hungarian national team. In 2025, Bujdoso became the first Hungarian ever to win a medal in orienteering at the World Games, winning bronze in the World Games Sprint in Chengdu.

== Career ==
Bujdoso was a promising junior, winning silver medals in relay events at the 2021 and 2022 Junior World Orienteering Championships and becoming Junior World Champion in the Middle Distance at the 2022 Junior World Championships in Portugal. This was the first gold medal for a Hungarian male orienteer at the Junior World Championships since 1996.

In 2025, Bujdoso won a bronze medal in the Sprint discipline at the 2025 World Games. It was the third medal of the games for the Hungarian team.
