= Francesco Mariani =

Italian orienteer

Personal information
- Born: 2001 (age 24–25)

Sport
- Sport: Orienteering
Medal record
Representing Italy
Men's orienteering
World Games
Silver medal – second place	2025 Chengdu	Middle
Junior World Championships
Gold medal – first place	2021 Kocaeli	Sprint

Francesco Mariani (born 2001) is an orienteering competitor who runs for the Italian national team.

== Career ==
Starting orienteering at the age of 7, Mariani was first selected for the junior Italian orienteering team in 2017. Mariani won a gold medal as a junior in the Sprint race at the 2021 Junior World Orienteering Championships in Turkey. The gold medal was the first time an Italian had ever won any international championship in Foot orienteering.

In 2024, Mariani came 5th place at the 2024 World Orienteering Championships in the Sprint discipline.

In the Middle Distance at the 2025 World Games, Mariani received a silver medal, his first medal at a senior international championships. It was the first ever medal for Italy in orienteering at the World Games, and Italy's first medal at the 2025 World Games.

== Personal life ==
Originally from Perugia, Mariani studied Statistical Sciences at the University of Bologna.
