= Vegard Jarvis Westergård =

Canadian orienteer

Personal information
- Born: 1996 (age 29–30) Bergen, Norway

Sport
- Sport: Orienteering
Medal record
Representing Canada
Men's orienteering
World Games
| Bronze medal – third place | 2025 Chengdu | Middle |

Vegard Jarvis Westergård (born 1996) is an orienteering competitor who runs for the Canadian national team. In 2025, Westergård became the first Canadian ever to win a medal at a major international orienteering competition, winning Bronze in the World Games Middle Distance in Chengdu.

== Career ==
Westergård is Norwegian Canadian, and spent most of his early orienteering career competing for the Norwegian national team, including competing for Norway at the Junior World Orienteering Championships in 2016. In 2019, Westergård won the bronze medal at a Red Bull 400 event hosted in Trondheim.

== Personal life ==
Westergård was born in Bergen, Norway. He moved to Halden near the Swedish border in 2015 after living in Bergen for his entire early life. Westergård is the youngest of three brothers, all of whom have competed at the Junior World Orienteering Championships. As of 2025, Westergård lives in Oslo.
