= Lithuania at the 2025 World Games =

- IOC code: LTU
- NOC: Lithuanian National Olympic Committee

in Chengdu, China 7 August 2025 – 17 August 2025
- Competitors: 21 (10 men and 11 women) in 2 sports and 3 events
- Medals Ranked 77th: Gold 0 Silver 0 Bronze 1 Total 1

World Games appearances
- 1981; 1985; 1989; 1993; 1997; 2001; 2005; 2009; 2013; 2017; 2022; 2025

Lithuania competed at the 2025 World Games held in Chengdu, China from 7 to 17 August 2025.

Athletes representing Lithuania won one bronze medal and the country finished in 77th place in the medal table.

== Medalist ==
Medal	Name	Sport	Event	Date
Bronze	Dominika Banevič	Dancesport	B-Girls	17 August

== Competitors ==
The following is the list of number of competitors in the Games.

Sport	Men	Women	Total
Dancesport	1	2	3
Flying disc	1	1	2
Total	2	3	5
