= Riccardo Rancan =

Swiss orienteer

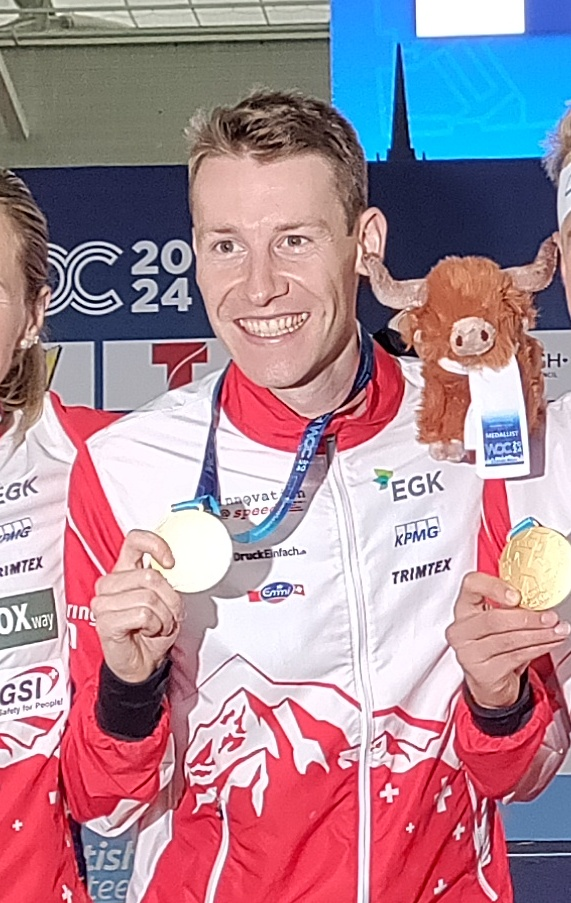
- Rancan at the 2024 World Orienteering Championships.

Personal information
- Born: 1996 (age 29–30) Uster, Switzerland

Sport
- Sport: Orienteering
Medal record
Representing Switzerland
Men's orienteering
World Games
Gold medal – first place	2025 Chengdu	Middle
Gold medal – first place	2025 Chengdu	Mixed sprint relay
World Championships
Gold medal – first place	2024 Edinburgh	Knockout sprint
Gold medal – first place	2024 Edinburgh	Sprint relay

Riccardo Rancan (born 1996) is an orienteering competitor who runs for the Swiss national team.

== Career ==
At the 2024 World Orienteering Championships, Rancan won a gold medal with the Swiss sprint relay team, along with Natalia Gemperle, Joey Hadorn and Simona Aebersold.
