= Mattia Debertolis =

Italian orienteering athlete (1996–2025)

Personal information
- Citizenship: Italian
- Born: 4 August 1996 Feltre, Italy
- Died: 12 August 2025 (aged 29) Chengdu, China
- Education: University of Trento; KTH Royal Institute of Technology (Note: Did not graduate)

Sport
- Sport: Orienteering
- Club: IFK Lidingö SOK; Park World Tour Italia

Achievements and titles
- World finals: 2023 World Championships; World Cup; 2025 World Games (Note: Did not complete)
- Regional finals: 2018 European Championships
- National finals: 2015 Maddalene Sky Marathon

Mattia Debertolis (4 August 1996 – 12 August 2025) was an Italian orienteering athlete.

== Life and career ==
Debertolis was born in Feltre, Italy on 4 August 1996. He was a member of the IFK Lidingö SOK, and the Park World Tour Italia clubs. On 30 August 2015, he competed in the Maddalene Sky Marathon.

He competed at the 2018 European Orienteering Championships, 2023 World Orienteering Championships, and the Orienteering World Cup.

He held a civil engineering degree from the University of Trento and was a Ph.D. student studying at KTH Royal Institute of Technology at the time of his death.

Debertolis died at a hospital in Chengdu, China, on 12 August 2025, at the age of 29. He had been found unconscious on August 8 during the men's middle-distance competition at the World Games. Following his death, the International World Games Association and the International Orienteering Federation issued a joint statement announcing his death.
