= 2024 World Orienteering Championships =

- Location: Edinburgh, Scotland
- Dates: 12–16 July 2024

The 2024 World Orienteering Championships was held from 12 to 16 July 2024 in Edinburgh, Scotland.

The championships consisted of 5 days of races, plus a warm-up event one day prior to the start of the competition.

== Schedule ==
Date	Event	Comment
12 July	Sprint	
13 July	Rest day	
14 July	Sprint relay	
15 July	Rest day	
16 July	Knock-out sprint	

== Medal summary ==
=== Men ===
Event	Gold		Silver		Bronze	
Sprint	Martin Regborn; Sweden	15:58	Tino Polsini; Switzerland	16:21	Emil Svensk; Sweden	16:25
Knock-out Sprint	Riccardo Rancan; Switzerland	07:35.6	Jørgen Baklid; Norway	07:36.7	Jonatan Gustafsson; Sweden	07:37.5

=== Women ===
Event	Gold		Silver		Bronze	
Sprint	Tove Alexandersson; Sweden	16:14	Simona Aebersold; Switzerland	16:29	Natalia Gemperle; Switzerland	16:33
Knock-out Sprint	Tove Alexandersson; Sweden	09:05.6	Karolin Ohlsson; Sweden	09:10.4	Simona Aebersold; Switzerland	09:11.0

=== Mixed ===
Event	Gold		Silver		Bronze	
Sprint relay	Switzerland; Natalia Gemperle; Riccardo Rancan; Joey Hadorn; Simona Aebersold	58:43.3	Finland; Maija Sianoja; Miika Kirmula; Tuomas Heikkila; Venla Harju	59:22.1	Norway; Victoria Hæstad Bjørnstad; Eirik Langedal Breivik; Kasper Fosser; Andrine Benjaminsen	59:46.6

=== Medal table ===
Rank	Nation	Gold	Silver	Bronze	Total
1	Sweden	3	1	2	6
2	Switzerland	2	2	2	6
3	Norway	0	1	1	2
4	Finland	0	1	0	1
Totals (4 entries)		5	5	5	15

== Results ==
=== Women's Sprint ===
WOC 2024 – Sprint – Women
Rank	Competitor	Nation	Time
1st place, gold medalist(s)	Tove Alexandersson	Sweden	16:14
2nd place, silver medalist(s)	Simona Aebersold	Switzerland	16:29
3rd place, bronze medalist(s)	Natalia Gemperle	Switzerland	16:33
4	Aleksandra Hornik	Poland	16:38
5	Malin Agervig Kristiansson	Denmark	16:56
6	Grace Molloy	Great Britain	17:00
7	Isia Basset	France	17:12
8	Sara Hagström	Sweden	17:17
9	Megan Carter Davies	Great Britain	17:20
10	Eline Gemperle	Switzerland	17:26

=== Men's Sprint ===
WOC 2024 – Sprint – Men
Rank	Competitor	Nation	Time
1st place, gold medalist(s)	Martin Regborn	Sweden	15:58
2nd place, silver medalist(s)	Tino Polsini	Switzerland	16:21
3rd place, bronze medalist(s)	Emil Svensk	Sweden	16:25
4	Gustav Bergman	Sweden	16:27
5	Francesco Mariani	Italy	16:40
6	Tim Robertson	New Zealand	16:41
7	Joseph Lynch	New Zealand	16:44
8	Tuomas Heikkila	Finland	16:45
9	Henry McNulty	Australia	16:52
10	Daniel Hubmann	Switzerland	16:53

=== Women's Knock-out sprint ===
WOC 2024 – Knock-out sprint – Women
Rank	Competitor	Nation	Time
1st place, gold medalist(s)	Tove Alexandersson	Sweden	09:05.6
2nd place, silver medalist(s)	Karolin Ohlsson	Sweden	09:10.4
3rd place, bronze medalist(s)	Simona Aebersold	Switzerland	09:11.0
4	Cecile Calandry	France	09:12.7
5	Megan Carter Davies	Great Britain	09:21.0
6	Venla Harju	Finland	09:27.7

=== Men's Knock-out sprint ===
WOC 2024 – Knock-out sprint – Men
Rank	Competitor	Nation	Time
1st place, gold medalist(s)	Riccardo Rancan	Switzerland	07:35.6
2nd place, silver medalist(s)	Jørgen Baklid	Norway	07:36.7
3rd place, bronze medalist(s)	Jonatan Gustafsson	Sweden	07:37.5
4	Joey Hadorn	Switzerland	07:37.7
5	Martin Regborn	Sweden	07:38.7
6	Alvaro Casado	Spain	07:44.7
