= Slovakia at the 2025 World Games =

- IOC code: SVK
- NOC: Slovak Olympic and Sports Committee

in Chengdu, China 7 August 2025 – 17 August 2025
- Competitors: 48 (16 men and 32 women) in 12 sports and 23 events
- Medals Ranked 39th: Gold 1 Silver 2 Bronze 3 Total 6

World Games appearances (overview)
- 1981; 1985; 1989; 1993; 1997; 2001; 2005; 2009; 2013; 2017; 2022; 2025

Slovakia competed at the 2025 World Games held in Chengdu, China from 7 to 17 August 2025.

Athletes representing Slovakia won one gold medal, two silver medals and three bronze medals. The country finished in 39th place in the medal table

== Medalists ==
Medal	Name	Sport	Event	Date
Gold	Denisa Baránková	Archery	Women's recurve	13 August
Silver	Tereza Šmelíková	Orienteering	Women's middle distance	8 August
Silver	Lucia Cmárová	Kickboxing	Women's K1 style 60 kg	14 August
Bronze	Monika Chochlíková	Muaythai	Women's 54 kg	10 August
Bronze	Emma Strculová	Powerboating	Women's single motosurf	17 August
Bronze	Marek Skamla; Sára Žuborová	Powerboating	Mixed Nations Cup	17 August

== Competitors ==
The following is the list of number of competitors in the Games.

Sport	Men	Women	Total
Archery	1	1	2
Canoe marathon	0	2	2
Dancesport	1	1	2
Floorball	0	14	14
Flying disc	7	7	14
Gymnastics	1	0	1
Karate	1	0	1
Kickboxing	0	2	2
Muaythai	0	1	1
Orienteering	2	2	4
Powerboating	2	2	4
Triathlon	1	1	2
Total	16	32	48

== Floorball ==
Summary

Team	Event	Preliminary round				Semifinal	Final / BM / PF	
Team	Event	Opposition Result	Opposition Result	Opposition Result	Rank	Opposition Result	Opposition Result	Rank
Slovakia women	Women's tournament	Switzerland; L 8–2	Thailand; W 14–0	Sweden; L 15–4	3	—	Singapore; W 13–2	5

== Gymnastics ==
=== Parkour ===
Men

Athlete	Event	Qualification		Final	
Athlete	Event	Result	Rank	Result	Rank
Esteban Malaga	Men's speed	27.79	6 Q	27.82	5
