= Jannis Bonek =

Austrian orienteer (born 1999)

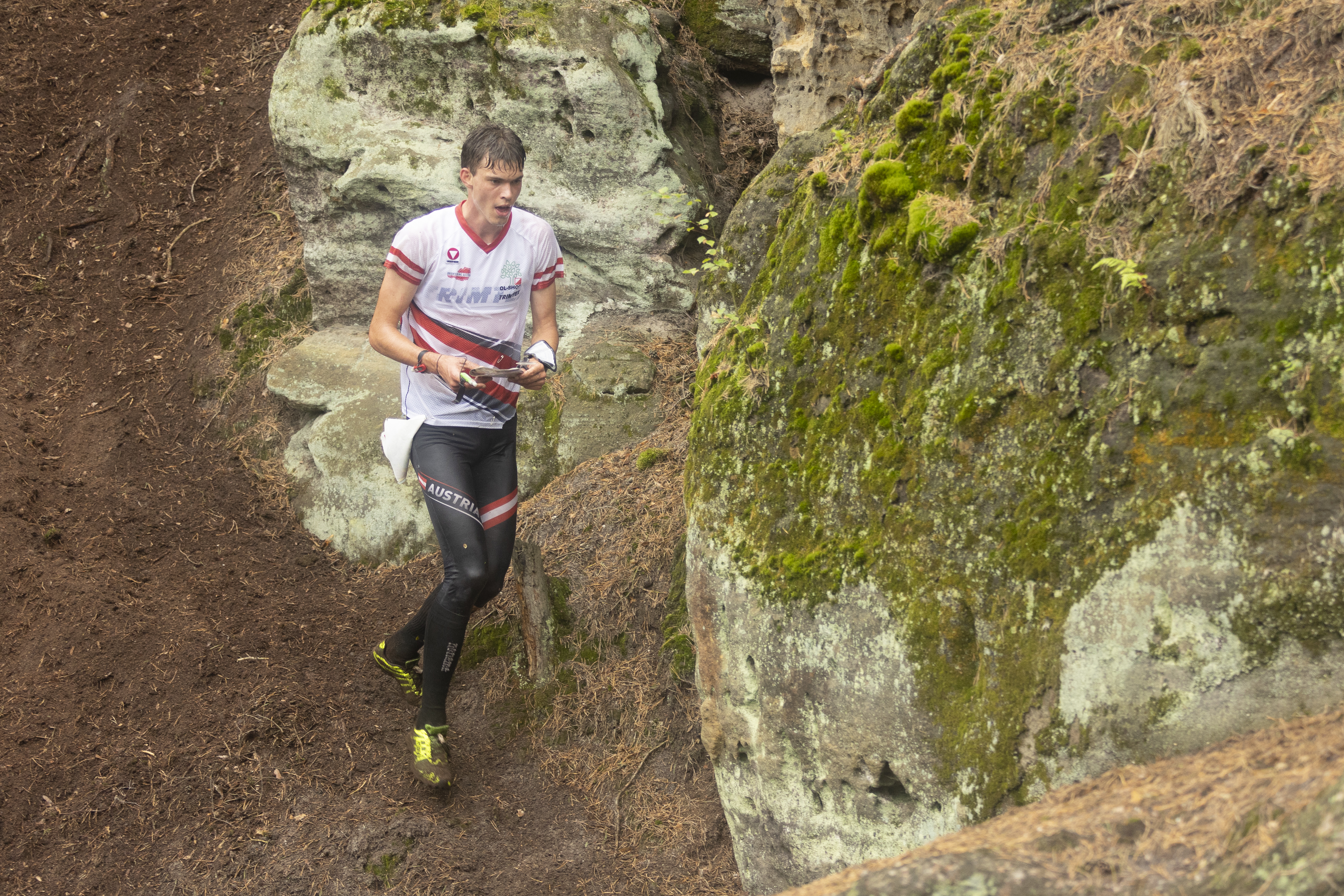
- Jannis Bonek (2023)

Personal information
- Born: 1999 (age 26–27)

Sport
- Sport: Orienteering
Medal record
Representing Austria
Men's orienteering
World Championships
Bronze medal – third place	2023 Grisons	Middle

Jannis Bonek (born 1999) is an Austrian orienteering competitor.

He won a bronze medal in the middle distance at the 2023 World Orienteering Championships. This was the first medal ever for Austrian men in the world orienteering championships.

Bonek was born in Vienna. His parents and grandparents are also orienteers, and Bonek first tried orienteering as a toddler, completing his first courses unaccompanied at the age of 8 or 9. Bonek spent half a year in Uppsala at a specialized orienteering school. Bonek has been a professional orienteer since at least 2019. Bonek runs for OK Linne in club events.
