= Latvia at the 2025 World Games =

- IOC code: LAT
- NOC: Latvian Olympic Committee

in Chengdu, China 7 August 2025 – 17 August 2025
- Competitors: 29 (23 men and 6 women) in 6 sports and 11 events
- Medals Ranked 77th: Gold 0 Silver 0 Bronze 1 Total 1

World Games appearances
- 1981; 1985; 1989; 1993; 1997; 2001; 2005; 2009; 2013; 2017; 2022; 2025

Latvia competed at the 2025 World Games held in Chengdu, China from 7 to 17 August 2025.

Athletes representing Latvia won one bronze medal and the country finished in 77th place in the medal table.

== Medalists ==
Medal	Name	Sport	Event	Date
Bronze	Rainers Balodis; Elizabete Pēkšena	Flying disc	Disc golf	10 August

== Competitors ==
The following is the list of number of competitors in the Games.

Sport	Men	Women	Total
Air sports	2	0	2
Dancesport	3	3	6
Floorball	14	0	14
Flying disc	1	1	2
Orienteering	2	2	4
Wakeboarding	1	0	1
Total	23	6	29

== Floorball ==
Summary

Team	Event	Preliminary round				Semifinal	Final / BM / PF	
Team	Event	Opposition Result	Opposition Result	Opposition Result	Rank	Opposition Result	Opposition Result	Rank
Latvia men	Men's tournament	Switzerland; L 3–4	Philippines; W 12–2	Sweden; L 7–1	3	—	Canada; W 12–3	5
