= Tim Robertson (orienteer) =

New Zealand orienteering competitor

Personal information
- Citizenship: New Zealand
- Born: 5 August 1995 (age 30) Lower Hutt, New Zealand
Medal record
Men's orienteering
Representing New Zealand
World Orienteering Championships
Silver medal – second place	2018 Latvia	Sprint
Bronze medal – third place	2021 Czech Republic	Sprint
World Games
Gold medal – first place	2022 Birmingham	Sprint
Junior World Championships
Gold medal – first place	2014 Bulgaria	Sprint
Gold medal – first place	2015 Norway	Sprint
Bronze medal – third place	2013 Czech Republic	Sprint
World University Championships
Gold medal – first place	2018 Finland	Sprint
- Updated on 29 January 2016

Tim Robertson (born 5 August 1995) is a New Zealand orienteering competitor. He won the gold medal in the sprint course at the Junior World Orienteering Championships in 2014, and 2015. He also co-hosts the popular podcast 'Orienteer Pod' alongside Ralph Street and Magnus Dewett.

Robertson was born in Lower Hutt, New Zealand. He has competed at the New Zealand Orienteering Championships, receiving many silver, gold, and bronze medals. Robertson's favourite orienteering competition is the Jukola relay.

== Junior World Orienteering Championships ==
Robertson competed at the Junior World Orienteering Championships for the first time in 2011. He placed 78 in the sprint, and a 93 place in the long. Robertson return in 2012 with a placing of 32 in the sprint, 29 place in the long, and 7 in the relay.

In 2013 Robertson won his first world championships medal, taking third place in the sprint. He also placed 25th in the long, and 20th in the relay.

He followed up with a gold medal at the 2014 championships taking first place in the sprint. He successfully defended his title in 2015 winning the gold medal in sprint with a 3 second edge over Aleksi Niemi from Finland.

== World Orienteering Championships ==
Robertson competed at the 2015 World Orienteering Championships. He was a member of the New Zealand sprint relay team that placed 12th. In the sprint, Robertson finished 20th. In the middle distance race, Robertson fell and dislocated his shoulder which had been dislocated twice earlier in the year. Because of the injury, he was unable to complete the race.

At the 2018 World Orienteering Championships in Latvia, Robertson won a silver medal in the men's sprint competition losing out on the gold medal by only 1.1 seconds. This was New Zealand's first ever World Championship medal at any orienteering discipline.

After the COVID-19 pandemic caused a two-year hiatus for the World Orienteering Championships, Robertson was selected by Orienteering NZ for the 2021 World Orienteering Championships. The New Zealand contingent was limited to two members due to the inability for NZ-based athletes to travel out of the country. Robertson was allowed to compete due to being based in Sweden prior to the pandemic.

At the 2021 World Championships Sprint in the Czech Republic, Robertson won bronze - continuing to cement his legacy as one of New Zealand's most successful orienteers. In Terezín, Robertson finished 3rd in the 1st heat, qualifying himself for the final. In the final, Robertson finished with the bronze medal, 13 seconds off the Swedish champion Isac Von Krusenstierna.

== World University Orienteering Championships ==
At the 2018 World University Orienteering Championships, Robertson won a gold medal in the men's sprint competition.
