= Smola =

Smola or Smøla may refer to:

== People ==
- Josef von Smola (1764–1820), officer and holder of the Knight's and Commander's Crosses of the Order of Maria Theresa
- Josef von Smola (1805–1856), Austrian officer
- Karl von Smola, Austrian officer
- Michal Smola, Czech orienteering competitor
- Todd Smola, American politician from Massachusetts
- Tomáš Smola, Czech footballer

== Places ==
- Smøla Municipality, a municipality in Møre og Romsdal county, Norway
- Smøla (island), an island in Smøla Municipality in Møre og Romsdal county, Norway
- Smøla Wind Farm, a windfarm on the island of Smøla in Møre og Romsdal county, Norway
