= Orienteering at the 2005 World Games – Men's middle distance =

Orienteering men's middle distance at the 2005 World Games
- Venue: Jahnstadion, Bottrop, Germany
- Date: 16 July 2005
- Competitors: 39 from 16 nations

Medalists
gold medal	(France) Thierry Gueorgiou
silver medal	(Switzerland) Daniel Hubmann
bronze medal	(Norway) Øystein Kvaal Østerbø

The men's middle distance competition in orienteering at the 2005 World Games took place on 16 July 2005 in the Jahnstadion in Bottrop, Germany.

== Competition format ==
A total of 39 athletes entered the competition. Every athlete had to check in at control points, which were located across the course.

== Results ==
Rank	Athlete	Nation	Time
1st place, gold medalist(s)	Thierry Gueorgiou	France	38:10.1
2nd place, silver medalist(s)	Daniel Hubmann	Switzerland	38:31.1
3rd place, bronze medalist(s)	Øystein Kvaal Østerbø	Norway	38:36.5
4	Christian Nielsen	Denmark	38:55.4
5	Yuri Omeltchenko	Ukraine	39:09.1
6	Damien Renard	France	39:14.8
7	Ingo Horst	Germany	39:18.1
8	Martin Johansson	Sweden	39:37.3
9	Holger Hott	Norway	39:41.6
10	Mārtiņš Sirmais	Latvia	39:55.0
11	Svajūnas Ambrazas	Lithuania	39:58.5
12	Grant Bluett	Australia	40:06.6
13	Johan Näsman	Sweden	40:10.0
14	Matthew Crane	(United Kingdom) Great Britain	40:17.8
15	Marián Dávidík	Slovakia	40:23.1
16	Matthias Merz	Switzerland	40:23.8
17	Simonas Krėpšta	Lithuania	40:29.1
18	Sergey Detkov	Russia	41:01.3
19	Tomáš Dlabaja	Czech Republic	41:13.1
20	Juha-Matti Huhtanen	Finland	41:16.8
21	Maxim Davydov	Russia	41:19.8
22	Claus Bloch	Denmark	41:21.0
23	Troy de Haas	Australia	41:49.3
24	Andreas Kraas	Estonia	42:00.6
25	Troels Nielsen	Denmark	42:04.4
26	Jonas Pilblad	Sweden	42:13.4
27	Petr Losman	Czech Republic	42:28.4
28	Nicolas Girsch	France	42:32.0
29	Jonne Lehto	Finland	42:35.8
30	Alexander Shcherbakov	Russia	42:50.1
31	Kristaps Jeudzems	Latvia	42:51.0
32	Nicholas Barrable	(United Kingdom) Great Britain	43:23.2
33	François Gonon	France	43:43.5
34	Ramūnas Šimanskas	Lithuania	43:44.5
35	Oskars Zernis	Latvia	43:47.2
36	Christian Ott	Switzerland	44:38.8
37	Axel Fischer	Germany	44:49.3
	Thormod Berg	Norway	DSQ
	Jörgen Wickholm	Finland	DNS
