= Sanna Nymalm =

Finnish orienteering competitor

Medal record

Women's orienteering

Representing Finland

World Championships
Silver medal – second place	1999 Inverness	Relay

Sanna Nymalm (born 1972) is a Finnish orienteering competitor. She received a silver medal in the relay event at the 1999 World Orienteering Championships in Inverness, together with Reeta-Mari Kolkkala, Kirsi Tiira and Johanna Asklöf. She finished 4th in the short distance at the 1999 World Championship, two seconds behind bronze medalist Frauke Schmitt Gran.

== See also ==
- Finnish orienteers
- List of orienteers
- List of orienteering events
