= Orienteering at the 2005 World Games – Women's middle distance =

Orienteering women's middle distance at the 2001 World Games
- Venue: Jahnstadion, Bottrop, Germany
- Date: 16 July 2005
- Competitors: 39 from 16 nations

Medalists
gold medal	(Switzerland) Simone Niggli-Luder
silver medal	(Germany) Karin Schmalfeld
bronze medal	(United Kingdom) Heather Monro

The women's middle-distance competition in orienteering at the 2005 World Games took place on 16 July 2005 in the Jahnstadion in Bottrop, Germany.

== Competition format ==
A total of 39 athletes entered the competition. Every athlete had to check in at control points, which were located across the course.

== Results ==
Rank	Athlete	Nation	Time
1st place, gold medalist(s)	Simone Niggli-Luder	Switzerland	36:44.1
2nd place, silver medalist(s)	Karin Schmalfeld	Germany	37:10.1
3rd place, bronze medalist(s)	Heather Monro	(United Kingdom) Great Britain	38:26.0
4	Tatiana Ryabkina	Russia	38:50.6
5	Ieva Sargautytė	Lithuania	40:01.1
6	Lea Müller	Switzerland	40:22.3
7	Merja Rantanen	Finland	40:27.5
8	Brigitte Grüniger	Switzerland	40:37.1
9	Dana Brožková	Czech Republic	40:38.9
10	Marta Štěrbová	Czech Republic	40:43.1
11	Katri Kerkola	Finland	40:52.8
12	Inga Dambe	Latvia	41:04.1
13	Camilla Berglund	Sweden	41:17.0
14	Monika Depta	Poland	41:28.3
15	Aija Skrastina	Latvia	41:29.4
16	Sarah Rollins	(United Kingdom) Great Britain	41:44.5
17	Lina Bäckström	Sweden	42:09.5
18	Céline Dodin	France	42:14.7
19	Elisa Dresen	Germany	42:23.2
20	Seline Stalder	Switzerland	42:31.2
21	Linda Take	Sweden	42:45.6
22	Vendula Klechová	Czech Republic	42:53.4
23	Kirti Rebane	Estonia	42:55.9
24	Signe Søes	Denmark	43:18.9
25	Helen Winskill	(United Kingdom) Great Britain	43:34.2
26	Juliette Soulard	France	43:44.1
27	Sandra Paužaitė	Lithuania	43:46.4
28	Lene Bergersen	Norway	44:04.5
29	Aliya Sitdikova	Russia	44:09.7
30	Vilma Rudzenskaitė	Lithuania	44:47.9
31	Salla Sukki	Finland	44:53.1
32	Allison Jones	Australia	45:00.1
33	Tatiana Yaxanova	Russia	45:00.1
34	Meike Jaeger	Germany	46:04.1
35	Linda Antonsen	Norway	46:10.6
36	Karina Boen Knudsen	Denmark	47:32.2
37	Tone Wigemyr	Norway	47:43.2
38	Veronica Minoiu	Romania	48:16.7
39	Danielle Winslow	Australia	50:03.6
