= Josef von Smola =

Josef von Smola may refer to:

- Josef von Smola (1764–1820), officer
- Josef von Smola (1805–1856), Austrian officer
