= Delta (orienteering club) =

Finnish sports club

Delta was an orienteering club in western Uusimaa of Finland. It formed in 1992 when three clubs started with joint teams and activities. Delta later dissolved in 2012. Hiidenkiertäjät then promised to keep training the best runners.

The initial participating clubs were Hiidenkiertäjät from Lohja, Karkki-Rasti from Karkkila, and Rasti-Vihti from Vihti.

== Results ==
Delta won the Jukola relay in 2008 with a team formed by Panu Piiparinen, Janne Heikka, Leonid Novikov, Petri Noponen, Oskari Liukkonen, Olle Kärner, and Valentin Novikov. Heikka and Novikov went first.

In 2012, the club's final year, they placed fourth in the Jukola relay.

== Members ==
Other runners for the club were Jani Lakanen, Jonne Lakanen, and Jarkko Huovila.
