= François Gonon =

French orienteering competitor

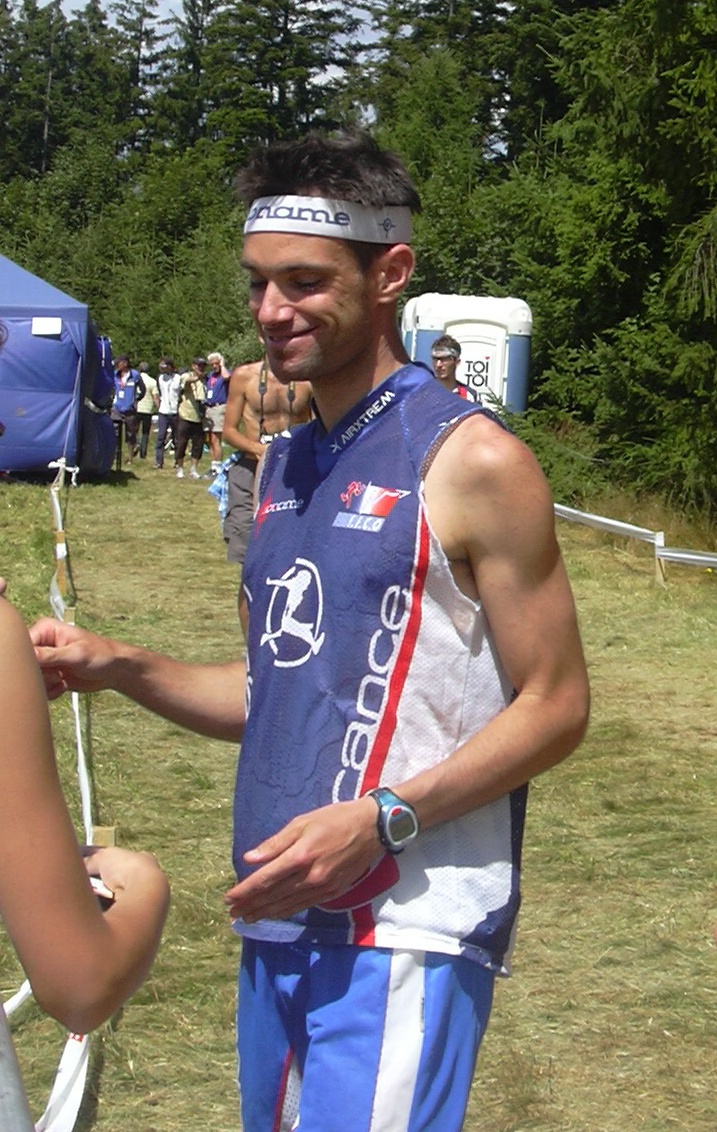
- Gonon at WOC 2008

Personal information
- Born: 23 April 1979 (age 47) Saint Etienne, France

Sport
- Sport: Orienteering; Skyrunning
- Club: O'JURA; IFK Göteborg
Medal record
Representing France
Orienteering
World Championships
Gold medal – first place	2011 Savoie	Relay
Silver medal – second place	2005 Aichi	Relay
Bronze medal – third place	2008 Olomouc	Long
Bronze medal – third place	2011 Savoie	Long
European Championships
Silver medal – second place	2006 Otepää	Relay
Bronze medal – third place	2012 Falun	Relay
Junior World Championships
Silver medal – second place	1999 Varna	Relay
Bronze medal – third place	1998 Reims	Relay
Skyrunning
European Championships
Gold medal – first place	2015 Chamoniz	Vertical Kilometer

François Gonon (born 23 April 1979) is a French orienteering competitor. He has received gold and silver medals with the French relay team in both world championships and European championships. He currently competes for the French orienteering club O'JURA and for the Swedish orienteering club IFK Göteborg.

== Biography ==
He competed at the 2005 World Orienteering Championships in Aichi, where he received a silver medal in relay with the French team. He received a silver medal in the relay event at the 2006 European Orienteering Championships in Otepää, together with Damien Renard and Thierry Gueorgiou. He finished 6th overall in the Orienteering World Cup in 2007. He received a bronze medal in the long distance event at the 2008 World Orienteering Championships in Olomouc. He received a gold medal in the relay event and a bronze medal in the long distance event at the 2011 World Orienteering Championships in Savoie.
