= Carl Henrik Bjørseth =

Norwegian orienteer (born 1968)

Medal record

Men's orienteering

Representing Norway

World Championships
Silver medal – second place	1999 Inverness	Classic distance
Silver medal – second place	2001 Tampere	Relay
Bronze medal – third place	2001 Tampere	Classic distance

Carl Henrik Bjørseth (born 8 February 1968) is a Norwegian orienteering competitor.

== Medals and Ranks ==
He received a silver medal in the classic course at the 1999 World Orienteering Championships, and a bronze medal in 2001. He received a silver medal in the relay event in 2001, together with Bernt Bjørnsgaard, Tore Sandvik and Bjørnar Valstad.

He won the Jukola relay in 1990 and 1995.

He finished 6th in the overall World Cup 1998, and 10th in 2000.
