= Marianne Riddervold =

Norwegian orienteer (born 1980)

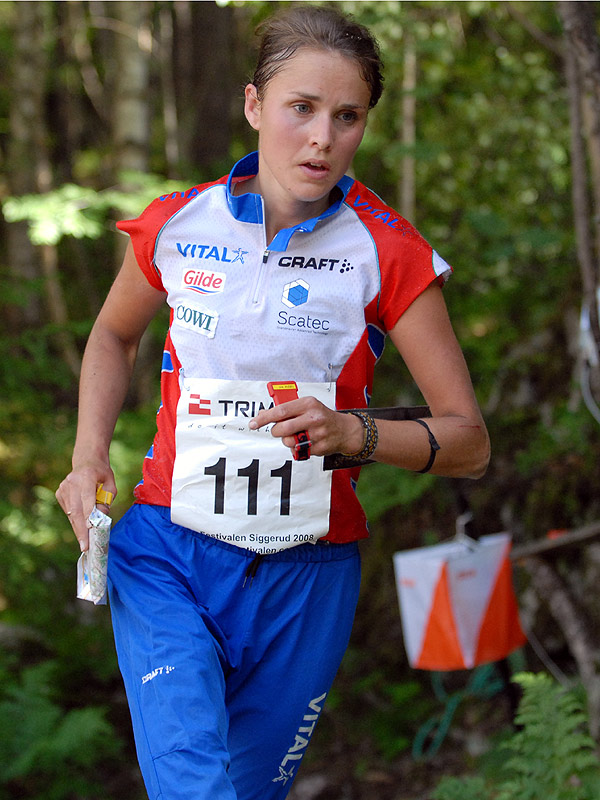
- Riddervold at the World Cup event at Siggerud, Norway 2008

Medal record

Women's orienteering

Representing Norway

World Championships
Silver medal – second place	2005 Aichi	Relay

Junior World Championships
Silver medal – second place	2000 Nové Město na Moravě	Long distance

Marianne Riddervold (born 5 March 1980) is a Norwegian orienteering competitor. She received a silver medal in the relay event at the 2005 World Orienteering Championships in Aichi, together with Marianne Andersen and Anne Margrethe Hausken.

She finished fourth with the Norwegian team in the relay event at the 2006 European Orienteering Championships in Otepää, and again 4th in Ventspils in 2008.
