= Jörgen Olsson =

Jörgen Olsson may refer to:

- Jörgen Olsson (badminton) (born 1976), Swedish badminton player
- Jörgen Olsson (orienteer) (born 1971), Swedish orienteer
- Jörgen Olsson (wrestler) (born 1968), Swedish Greco-Roman wrestler
