= Bjørlo =

Bjørlo is a surname. Notable people with the surname include:

- Alfred Bjørlo (born 1972), Norwegian politician
- Kjetil Bjørlo (born 1968), Norwegian orienteering competitor
- Morten Bjørlo (born 1995), Norwegian footballer
- Per Inge Bjørlo (born 1952), Norwegian sculptor, painter, graphic designer, and visual artist
