= Mats Haldin =

Finnish orienteer

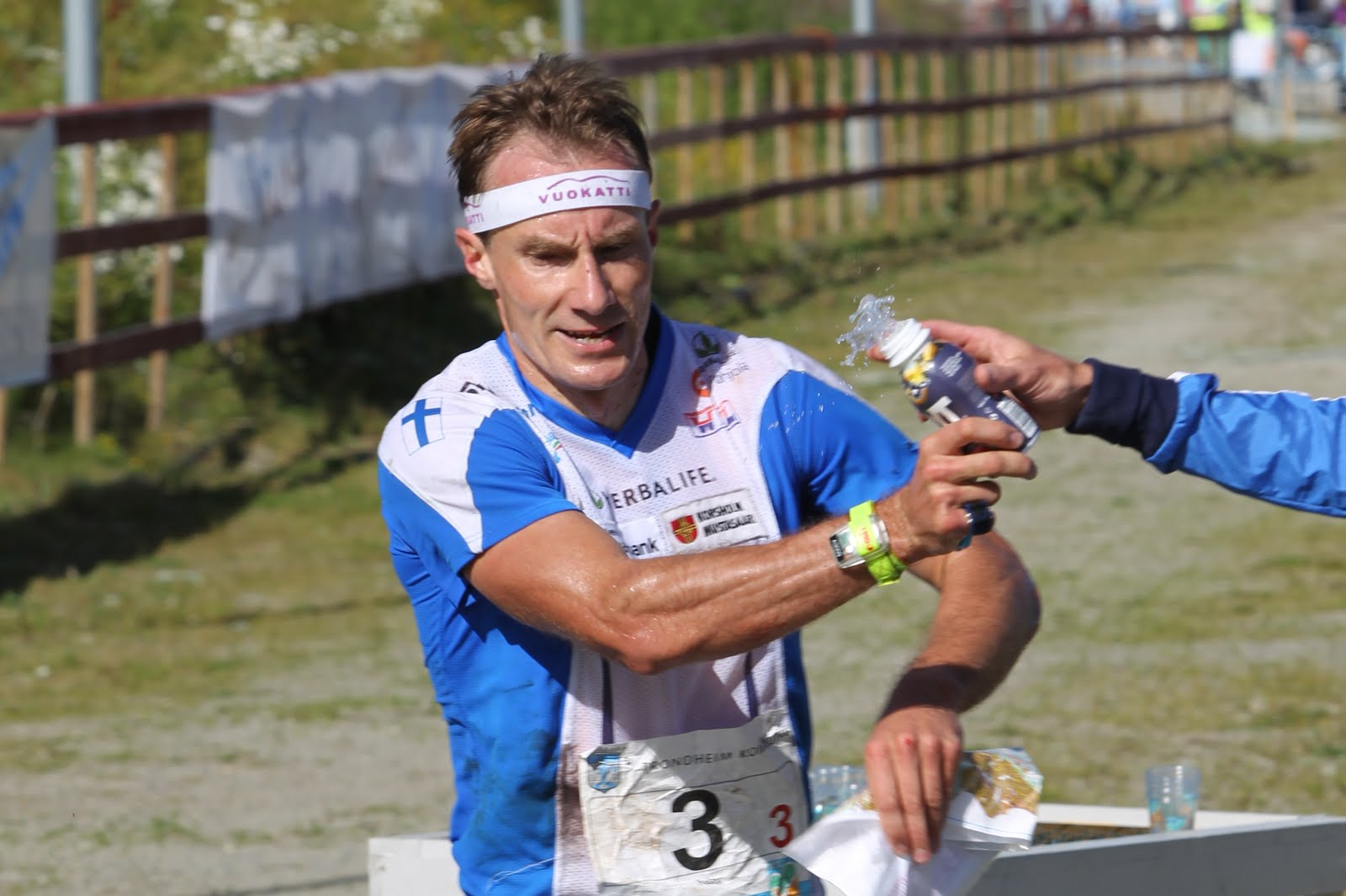
- Haldin at WOC 2010

Medal record

Men's orienteering

Representing Finland

World Championships
Silver medal – second place	2003 Rapperswil-Jona	Relay
Silver medal – second place	2006 Aarhus	Relay
Bronze medal – third place	2007 Kyiv	Relay
Bronze medal – third place	2009 Miskolc	Relay

European Championships
Gold medal – first place	2002 Sümeg	Relay
Gold medal – first place	2004 Roskilde	Relay
Silver medal – second place	2004 Roskilde	Long distance
Bronze medal – third place	2008 Ventspils	Relay

Mats Haldin (born 17 May 1975) is a Finnish orienteer and two-time European champion with the Finnish relay team. He received a silver medal with the Finnish relay team at the 2003 World Orienteering Championships in Rapperswil and Jona, Switzerland and again in 2006 in Aarhus, Denmark. He received a bronze medal in relay at the 2007 World Orienteering Championships in Kyiv, Ukraine. At the 2009 World Orienteering Championships in Miskolc, Hungary, he earned a bronze medal in relay with Topi Anjala and Tero Föhr.

His wife is Czech orienteer Vendula Klechová. Their daughter Hanna was born on 25 May 2011.

Haldin won the Jukola relay three times, in 2003, 2010 and 2011, for Halden SK.

== Awards ==
- Finnish Orienteer of the Year 2002

== See also ==
- Finnish orienteers
- List of orienteers
- List of orienteering events
