= Jukola relay =

Orienteering relay race held annually in Finland

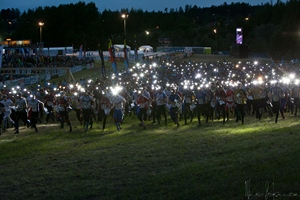
The Jukola 2012 relay start had 1600 men with their headlamps

350 half-platoon tents provided by Finnish Defense forces were used to host the teams in Kuopio-Jukola. Video of building the tent village.

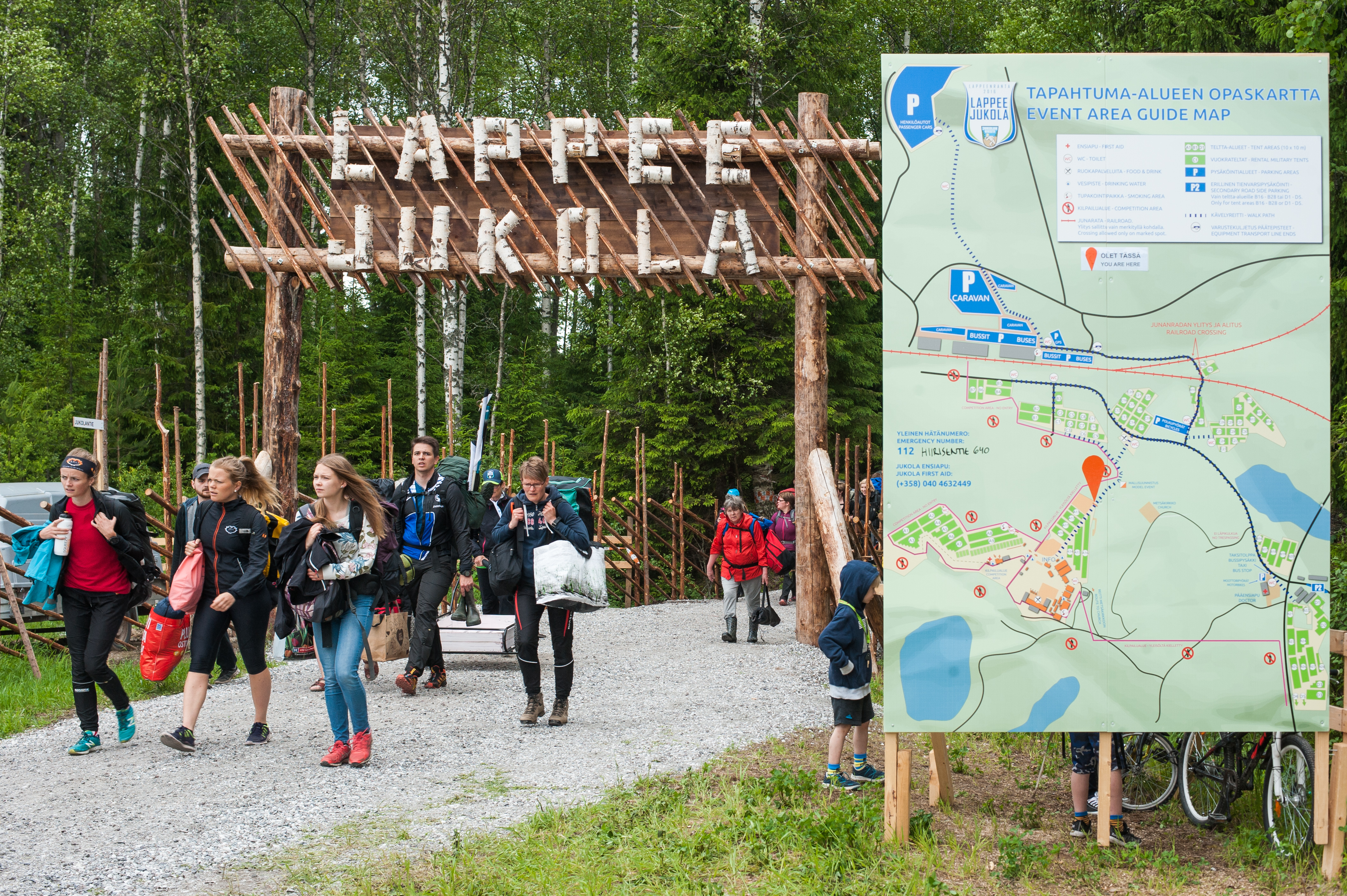
The Jukola 2016 relay

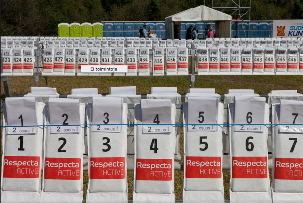
Jukola 2012: 1250 maps waiting Venla orienteers from the first leg

The Jukola Relay is an orienteering relay race held annually in Finland since 1949. Jukola is the biggest orienteering relay event in the world. The race takes place on a Saturday between 13 and 19 June in sites around Finland. The northernmost location has been 50 km north of the Arctic Circle. The name Jukola is a family name in the classic Finnish novel, "Seven Brothers". The women's relay, known as the Venla Relay, is a daytime race on the Saturday afternoon. It is named after the main female character from the novel.

The Jukola relay has seven legs with varying distances. The starting time is around 11 pm when the sun sets. Runners for the first three legs usually wear headlights, depending on the geographical site (northern or southern Finland) of the relay and the weather conditions. The winning team crosses the finishing line early on Sunday morning, around 6 or 7 am, and the last teams finish just before the finish is closed in the afternoon. Women can participate in the Jukola relay in non-official teams (non-sports club teams, like company, family or other teams).

For the women, an individual race with a mass start was organized in 1951. This was turned into a three-leg relay race in 1978 and then a four-leg relay race in 1981. In 2012 the Jukola relay attracted close to 1700 teams and the Venla relay more than 1250. Clubs from 20 countries took part.

The "Kaukametsäläiset" association is the founder of the Jukola relay and it is also the owner of the rights to the Jukola event.

== The Youth Jukola relay ==
Since 1986, a Jukola relay event for young orienteers has been organized as a separate event in August each year. The Youth Jukola relay is the world's most attended junior orienteering relay.

== History of Jukola and Venla ==
=== Winning clubs ===
Year	Location	Jukola Starters	Jukola Finishers	Jukola Winner	Venla Starters	Venla Finishers	Venla Winner
1949	Helsinki surroundings	41	15	(Finland) Helsingin Suunnistajat	-	-	-
1950	Rural municipality of Helsinki to City of Helsinki	62	45	(Finland) Helsingin Suunnistajat	-	-	-
1951	Hollola, airport	71	37	(Finland) IK Örnen	-	-	-
1952	Vanaja, Miemala	83	57	(Finland) Helsingin Suunnistajat	-	-	-
1953	Valkeala, Savero	82	31	(Finland) Helsingin Suunnistajat	-	-	-
1954	Lahti, Arkiomaa	96	71	(Finland) Hämeenlinnan Suunnistajat	-	-	-
1955	Kangasala, Säynäjärvi	115	83	(Finland) Asikkalan Raikas	-	-	-
1956	Riihimäki, Paalijärvi	127	38	(Finland) Helsingin Suunnistajat	-	-	-
1957	Virolahti, Ravijoki	108	59	(Finland) Helsingin Suunnistajat	-	-	-
1958	Pyhäjärvi Ul, Vuotinainen	119	95	(Finland) XYZ	-	-	-
1959	Tyrvää, Vaununperä	134	112	(Finland) Asikkalan Raikas	-	-	-
1960	Kouvola-Valkeala	132	111	(Finland) Helsingin Suunnistajat	-	-	-
1961	Tammela, Valkeaviita	143	113	(Finland) Tampereen Pyrintö	-	-	-
1962	Orimattila, Luhtikylä	173	119	(Finland) Tampereen Pyrintö	-	-	-
1963	Kiikala, Johannislund	154	86	(Finland) Tampereen Pyrintö	-	-	-
1964	Joutseno, Vesikkola	178	136	(Finland) Tampereen Poliisi-Urheilijat	-	-	-
1965	Petäjävesi, Kintaus	210	195	(Sweden) IFK Hedemora	-	-	-
1966	Padasjoki, Tarusjärvi	225	176	(Finland) Tampereen Kilpa-Veljet	-	-	-
1967	Halikko, Hajala	264	214	(Finland) Asikkalan Raikas	-	-	-
1968	Mäntsälä, Kaukalampi	300	238	(Finland) Asikkalan Raikas	-	-	-
1969	Tyrvää, Roismala	327	280	(Finland) Liedon Parma	-	-	-
1970	Riihimäki, Paarijoki	383	250	(Finland) Helsingin Suunnistajat	-	-	-
1971	Vehkalahti, Pyhältö	329	264	(Finland) IK Örnen	-	-	-
1972	Paimio, Motelli	443	365	(Finland) Liedon Parma	-	-	-
1973	Hämeenlinna, Miemala	435	308	(Finland) Angelniemen Ankkuri	-	-	-
1974	Puumala, Pistohiekka	411	344	(Finland) Liedon Parma	-	-	-
1975	Kankaanpää, Niinisalo	475	384	(Finland) Alavuden Urheilijat	-	-	-
1976	Tenala, Spjutsböle	453	406	(Sweden) Gustavsbergs IF	-	-	-
1977	Ruokolahti, Virmutjoki	471	395	(Finland) Tampereen Yritys	-	-	-
1978	Kuorevesi, Halli	595	490	(Finland) Järvenpään Palo	190	174	(Finland) Sippurasti
1979	Lapua, Simpsiönvuori	594	523	(Norway) Lyn	225	209	(Finland) Kalevan Rasti
1980	Rovaniemi, Ounasvaara	508	455	(Sweden) OK Ravinen	191	178	(Finland) Hiidenkiertäjät
1981	Hyvinkää, Kytäjä	753	495	(Sweden) Almby IK	271	199	(Norway) Bäkkelagets SK
1982	Liperi, Pärnävaara	728	647	(Sweden) OK Ravinen	237	228	(Sweden) Stora Tuna IK
1983	Valkeala, Selänpää	807	742	(Finland) Vehkalahden Veikot	310	285	(Sweden) Almby IK
1984	Rural municipality of Heinola, Vierumäki	920	859	(Sweden) Almby IK	371	350	(Sweden) Stora Tuna IK
1985	Laitila, Tulejärvi	937	838	(Sweden) Almby IK	403	386	(Sweden) Stora Tuna IK
1986	Tampere, Kaanaa	991	945	(Sweden) IFK Södertälje	441	419	(Norway) Halden SK
1987	Hollola, airport	1052	989	(Finland) Hiidenkiertäjät	476	447	(Sweden) OK Hedströmmen
1988	Pudasjärvi, Isosyöte	976	874	(Norway) Bækkelagets SK	423	398	(Norway) Halden SK
1989	Joutseno, Myllymäki	1067	956	(Norway) NTNUI	519	483	(Finland) Helsingin NMKY
1990	Juva, Koikkala	1109	1011	(Norway) NTNUI	573	548	(Norway) Halden SK
1991	Vimpeli, Lakeaharju	1144	1061	(Sweden) IFK Södertälje	543	512	(Sweden) IFK Södertälje
1992	Virolahti, Ravijoki	1131	1050	(Sweden) IK Hakarpspojkarna	578	554	(Finland) Kalevan Rasti
1993	Paimio, Vista	1051	982	(Norway) Halden SK	545	518	(Finland) Rastikarhut
1994	Pelkosenniemi, PyhäLuosto	982	873	(Finland) Turun Suunnistajat	486	455	(Finland) Tampereen Pyrintö
1995	Sipoo, Sipoo kk.	1107	989	(Norway) NTNUI	597	537	(Finland) Liedon Parma
1996	Rautavaara, Harsukangas	1049	963	(Finland) Turun Suunnistajat	535	511	(Norway) Bäkkelagets SK
1997	Jyväskylä, Killerjärvi	1172	1057	(Norway) Halden SK	645	604	(Norway) Bäkkelagets SK
1998	Siuntio, Svartbäck	1224	1113	(Norway) Halden SK	667	635	(Finland) Angelniemen Ankkuri
1999	Eurajoki, Rikantila	1226	1109	(Norway) Bækkelagets SK	678	630	(Finland) Tampereen Pyrintö
2000	Liperi, Pänävaara	1134	960	(Norway) Halden SK	622	575	(Finland) Liedon Parma
2001	Jurva, Tainuskylä	1189	1042	(Finland) Turun Suunnistajat	689	639	(Finland) Liedon Parma
2002	Asikkala, Vesivehmaa	1256	1063	(Norway) Bækkelagets SK	728	694	(Finland) Turun Suunnistajat
2003	Sulkava, Sulkava kk.	1205	1053	(Norway) Halden SK	708	646	(Finland) Tampereen Pyrintö
2004	Jämijärvi, Jämi	1314	1137	(Finland) Kalevan Rasti	796	764	(Sweden) Ulricehamns OK
2005	Anjalankoski, Sippola	1331	1130	(Finland) Kalevan Rasti	841	770	(Sweden) Ulricehamns OK
2006	Salo, Karjaskylä	1337	1115	(Finland) Vehkalahden Veikot	854	798	(Sweden) Ulricehamns OK
2007	Lapua, Simpsiönvuori	1345	1151	(Finland) Kalevan Rasti	881	798	(Finland) Asikkalan Raikas
2008	Tampere, Kaanaa	1389	1172	(Finland) Delta	951	870	(Sweden) Domnarvets GoIF
2009	Mikkeli, Kalevankangas	1412	1265	(Norway) Kristiansand OK	978	911	(Sweden) Ulricehamns OK
2010	Hyvinkää, Kytäjä–Usmi	1537	1232	(Norway) Halden SK	1083	997	(Finland) Tampereen Pyrintö
2011	Virolahti, Ravijoki	1504	1298	(Norway) Halden SK	1048	981	(Sweden) Domnarvets GoIF
2012	Vantaa, Sotunki	1685	1378	(Finland) Kalevan Rasti	1246	1145	(Norway) Halden SK
2013	Jämsä, Myllymäki	1632	1383	(Finland) Kalevan Rasti	1210	1141	(Denmark) OK Pan Århus
2014	Kuopio, Vehmersalmi	1628	1357	(Finland) Kalevan Rasti	1211	1139	(Denmark) OK Pan Århus
2015	Paimio, Mäntyrinne–Hiekkahelmi	1787	1514	(Norway) Kristiansand OK	1286	1305	(Sweden) Domnarvets GoIF
2016	Lappeenranta, Raippo–Simola	1683	1374	(Finland) Koovee	1358	1237	(Norway) Halden SK
2017	Joensuu, Harpatti	1600	1351	(Sweden) IFK Göteborg	1269	1182	(Sweden) Alfta-Ösa OK
2018	Lahti–Hollola, Hälvälä	1901	1644	(Finland) Koovee	1632	1518	(Sweden) Stora Tuna OK
2019	Kangasala, Heponiemi	1950	1652	(Sweden) Stora Tuna OK	1692	1624	(Norway) Fredrikstad SK
2020	cancelled due to the COVID-19 pandemic						
2021	Rovaniemi, Mäntyvaara	1252	750	(Sweden) Stora Tuna OK	1014	692	(Sweden) Alfta-Ösa OK
2022	Mynämäki, Kallavuori	1592	1270	(Sweden) Stora Tuna OK	1432	1270	(Sweden) IFK Göteborg
2023	Porvoo Borgå, Epoo	1704	1411	(Sweden) Stora Tuna OK	1558	1437	(Sweden) IFK Göteborg
2024	Kauhava	1655	1403	(Sweden) Stora Tuna OK	1426	1246	(Sweden) Stora Tuna OK
2025	Mikkeli, Tikkala	1731	1318	(Sweden) Stora Tuna OK	1475	1365	(Sweden) IFK Göteborg
2026	Kotka	1879	1579	(Sweden) Stora Tuna OK	1551	1399	(Sweden) IFK Göteborg

=== Men's winners ===
Year	Winning Time	Runner 1	Runner 2	Runner 3	Runner 4	Runner 5	Runner 6	Runner 7
1949	11.56.39	E. Seväkivi	E. Kupiainen	A. Kokko	R. Heurlin	E. Aro	A. Salminen	E. Huuhka
1950	11.59.08	V. Salonen	T. Haarma	R. Harmo	A. Salminen	J. Salmenkylä	E. Aro	E. Huuhka
1951	12.45.42	H. Sell	K-E. Sjödahl	R. Sell	T. Knichter	S-E. Fagerholm	B. Malmström	L. Backman
1952	12.39.49	J. Hämäläinen	R. Harmo	O. Mäenpää	E. Huuhka	A. Ek	J. Salmenkylä	E. Aro
1953	12.26.58	M. Salmenkylä	J. Hämäläinen	E. Virtanen	O. Mäenpää	J. Salmenkylä	E. Aro	A. Ek
1954	12.11.07	E. Majuri	V. Talvisilta	E. Lemmetty	S. Lehtinen	A. Laine	E. Hakala	E. Ravea
1955	10.12.26	M. Tuomaila	A. Kivistö	S. Jussila	E. Nurminen	E. Vainio	S. Peltonen	M. Salokannel
1956	13.09.12	S. Hakoniemi	A. Ek	O. Mäenpää	E. Kupiainen	T. Laurikainen	E. Aro	J. Salmenkylä
1957	11.58.52	M. Niemi	O. Mäenpää	T. Laurikainen	E. Kupiainen	E. Aro	S. Hakoniemi	J. Salmenkylä
1958	11.02.05	S. Hakoniemi	Y. Teeriaho	A. Niemelä	M. Varuskivi	H. Virolainen	T. Luonteri	O. Niemelä
1959	10.22.11	E. Riukka	E. Vainio	S. Jussila	H. Avikainen	M. Salokannel	J. Tommola	A. Kivistö
1960	10.00.23	E. Virtanen	M. Salmenkylä	M. Niemi	E. Aro	T. Laurikainen	M. Mattila	J. Salmenkylä
1961	10.42.28	R. Hakala	E. Kuusniemi	M. Järvinen	V. Kotkaslahti	H. Virtanen	R. Vehviläinen	J. Syrjänen
1962	11.16.15	R. Hakala	E. Kuusniemi	V. Kotkaslahti	M. Järvinen	R. Vehviläinen	H. Virtanen	J. Syrjänen
1963	12.47.16	R. Hakala	E. Kuusniemi	K. Tarvainen	J. Syrjänen	V. Kotkaslahti	R. Vehviläinen	H. Virtanen
1964	9.58.53	E. Pekarila	V. Harjula	A. Rantala	K. Laurila	H. Rantala	M. Rantala	M. Rantala
1965	9.18.32	I. Johansson	O. Johansson	B. Gustafsson	K. Johansson	B. Sjögren	S. Gustafsson	B. Norman
1966	12.46.43	E. Rantanen	P. Heikkonen	I. Sandström	T. Moilanen	T. Vilen	R. Kujansuu	P. Reunamäki
1967	10.00.57	T. Ala-Heikkilä	T. Rautavuo	E. Vainio	V. Tahvanainen	P. Rautavuo	A. Kivistö	H. Avikainen
1968	10.26.30	T. Ala-Heikkilä	T. Rautavuo	P. Pökälä	H. Avikainen	P. Rautavuo	A. Kivistö	V. Tahvanainen
1969	10.16.09	J. Siivonen	R. Lehkonen	R. Jalonen	T. Grönroos	T. Torpo	T. Peltola	T. Peltola
1970	10.05.28	R. Hirn	V. Turku	M. Mattila	J. Salminen	S. Korhonen	J. Salmenkylä	M. Salminen
1971	10.06.14	H. Eklundh	K. Lagerbohm	A. Sell	H-G. Gustavsen	A. Pasonen	K. Lillandt	R. Koskinen
1972	9.09.48	R. Lehkonen	R. Jalonen	T. Grönroos	T. Torpo	T. Peltola	V. Kiili	T. Peltola
1973	10.09.44	M. Mannonen	H. Laine	H. Paganus	O. Knaapi	J. Salusvuori	M. Mäkinen	S. Väli-Klemelä
1974	8.12.09	R. Jalonen	T. Mäkeläinen	R. Lehkonen	T. Grönroos	T. Peltola	V. Kiili	T. Peltola
1975	8.17.47	J. Taimisto	M. Hautala	J. Pikkarainen	T. Järvinen	M. Taimisto	J. Rönnqvist	H. Mäkirinta
1976	8.50.10	T. Wester	L-G. Fransson	M. Haraldsson	T. Johansson	L. Strandberg	G. Andersson	B. Nordin
1977	8.18.25	J. Jokela	P. Nyman	T. Huhta	J. Mäki	A. Anjala	E. Ylikoski	K. Rauhamäki
1978	8.44.01	U. Kervinen	J. Torvikoski	V. Parviainen	H. Kurppa	K. Juvonen	P. Jauhiainen	M. Salminen
1979	8.15.07	J. Kaarby	R. Röed	E. Ulseth	J. Nielsen	I. Formo	S. Jakobsen	V. Åberg
1980	7.27.59	L. Forsberg	S. Olsson	T. Tjernlund	C. Gustavsson	A. Nåbo	O. Nåbo	L. Lönnkvist
1981	10.26.33	H. Stridh	S. Branth	L. Olsson	K. Fegerfelt	B. Stenberg	J. Mårtensson	K. Lauri
1982	8.52.16	S. Olsson	A. Nåbo	T. Tjernlund	L. Forsberg	B. Rosendahl	O. Nåbo	L. Lönnkvist
1983	8.11.04	P. Fincke	M. Joensuu	J. Tepponen	V. Tervo	P. Jokimies	H. Lehtikangas	T. Harju
1984	9.10.40	J. Granstedt	R. Lönn	S. Brandth	B. Stenberg	K. Lauri	B. Levin	J. Mårtensson
1985	8.41.37	J. Granstedt	R. Lönn	S. Brandth	U. Larsson	B. Stenberg	K. Lauri	J. Mårtensson
1986	8.27.18	A. Lillstrand	A. Friberg	K. Nilsson	M. Wehlin	M. Hellstadius	A. Hansen	B. Stenberg
1987	7.57.28	A. Paulin	J. Tikkala	J. Tepponen	J. Herva	P. Forsman	J. Liukkonen	K. Sallinen
1988	8.44.40	L. Drage	Y. Christiansen	E. Johansen	T. Rönneberg	J. S. Edström	P. Thoresen	Ö. Thon
1989	8.59.38	B. Engdahl	M. Davidson	A. Dengerud	J. Wicklund	B. Haavengen	K. Björlo	H. Tveite
1990	8.38.27	B. T. Krong	Ö. Holo	A. Dengerud	J. Wicklund	C. H. Björseth	B. Haavengen	H. Tveite
1991	7.15.52	G. Eriksson	P. Jonsson	K. Enckell	A. Mogensen	P. Forsman	M. Wehlin	M. Karlsson
1992	8.04.21	A. Rangert	B. Granstedt	F. Eskilsson	L. Söderberg	M. Granstedt	L. Nordgren	J. Ivarsson
1993	7.55.42	L. Johansen	J. S. Mjölneröd	T. Snilsberg	H. Vestlund	P. Olaussen	Ö. Holo	P. Thoresen
1994	7.04.56	J. Nieminen	J. Hannula	R. Ödum	T. Tölkkö	J. Nikulainen	P. Forsman	J. Salmi
1995	8.56.54	L. Virtanen	B. Lynum	C. Vogelsang	H. Bakke	T. Sandvik	C. H. Björseth	B. Valstad
1996	7.49.37	J. Eskola	J. Laine	J. Nieminen	L. Virtanen	V. Repo	T. Tölkkö	J. Salmi
1997	8.04.46	D. Jones	T. Snilsberg	J. Carlsson	A. Björnsgaard	C. Terkelsen	B. Björnsgaard	P. Thoresen
1998	8.09.36	J. Carlsson	T. Berg	T. Sandvik	B. Björnsgaard	C. Terkelsen	K. Björlo	P. Thoresen
1999	7.40.10	A. Berger	J. Moe	J. Ivarsson	B. Engdahl	J. Rostrup	H. Johansen	B. Valstad
2000	8.21.11	B. Eriksen	K. Björlo	Ö. Kristiansen	C. Terkelsen	B. Björnsgaard	J. Huovila	T. Sandvik
2001	7.28.12	J. Svihovsky	J. Laine	T. de Haas	V. Repo	M. Niggli	J. Rostrup	J. Salmi
2002	7.47.37	U. Brenna	J. Ivarsson	H-O Amblie	J. Sundby	B. Valstad	T. Berg	B. Björnsgaard
2003	7.35.48	J. Carlsson	E. Wingstedt	Ö. Kristiansen	P. Thoresen	T. Sandvik	J. Huovila	M. Haldin
2004	6.51.51	M. Boström	S. Launiainen	T. Tölkkö	H. Romppanen	A. Harju	S. Martomaa	T. Gueorgiou
2005	7:41:17	H. Romppanen	M. Boström	T. Tölkkö	H. Airila	A. Harju	S. Martomaa	T. Gueorgiou
2006	8:18:06	J. Lehto	T. Mattila	J. Liuha	J. Weckman	B. Rollier	S. Fincke	T. Föhr
2007	7:44:16	P. Adamski	S. Launiainen	T. Tölkkö	H. Airila	M. Hernelahti	S. Martomaa	T. Gueorgiou
2008	8:18:04	P. Piiparinen	J. Heikka	L. Novikov	P. Noponen	O. Liukkonen	O. Kärner	V. Novikov
2009	8:02:43	J. Duncan	N. Audun Bjerkreim	B. Rollier	J. Andersen	D. Renard	H. Hott	D. Hubmann
2010	8:32:41	K. Nikolov	E. Axelsson	A. Nordberg	M. Karlsson	M. Haldin	E. Wingstedt	O. Lundanes
2011	7:37:27	S. Bobach	J. Pedersen	E. Axelsson	M. Bjugan	M. Haldin	E. Wingstedt	O. Lundanes
2012	7:56:02	K. Nikolov	J. Huovila	S-P. Fincke	H. Airila	J. Pajunen	P. Adamski	F. Hertner
2013	7:27:58	J. Pajunen	S-P. Fincke	P. Adamski	H. Airila	J. Prochazka	F. Hertner	T. Gueorgiou
2014	7:59:01	J. Pajunen	P. Adamski	A. Asikainen	H. Airila	S-P. Fincke	F. Hertner	T. Gueorgiou
2015	8:07:27	V. Danielsen	M. Nykodym	B. Rollier	M. Dahlen	H. G. Omdal	M. Hubmann	D. Hubmann
2016	8:03:46	T. Anjala	L. Sild	T. Sild	J. Myllärinen	J. Lakanen	O. Kratov	D. Hubmann
2017	7:31:45	M. P. Bejmer	J. Högstrand	V. R. Bråten	J. Pilblad	F. Edn	F. Bakkman	E. Kinneberg
2018	7:27:18	J. Hirvikallio	T. Anjala	L. Sild	O. Kratov	K. Kivikas	T. Sild	D. Hubmann
2019	7:14:39	Je. Svensk	H. Johannesson	O. Kalered	Jo. Svensk	V. Svensk	A. Sjökvist	E. Svensk
2021	8:02:32	A. Sjökvist	H. Johannesson	O. Kalered	Je. Svensk	Jo. Svensk	V. Svensk	E. Svensk
2022	7:56:08	Je. Svensk	O. Kalered	Jo. Svensk	A. Sjökvist	H. Johannesson	E. Svensk	V. Svensk
2023	8:21:23	Je. Svensk	O. Kalered	Jo. Svensk	A. Sjökvist	H. Johannesson	V. Svensk	E. Svensk
2024	7:58:21	O. Kalered	Jo. Svensk	Je. Svensk	V. Johansson	H. Johannesson	V. Svensk	E. Svensk
2025	8:24:01	O. Kalered	Jo. Svensk	Je. Svensk	V. Johansson	H. Johannesson	V. Svensk	E. Svensk
2026	7:52:43	O. Kalered	V. Johansson	Jo. Svensk	Je. Svensk	E. Svensk	H. Johannesson	V. Svensk

== Upcoming events ==
Year	Dates	Location	Organizing clubs	Official Website
2026	June	Kotka	Kymin Suunnistajat & Vehkalahden Veikot	
2027	June	Sotkamo	Sotkamon Jymy & Vuokatti Sport Resort Oy	
2028	June	Espoo	Espoon Suunta	
