= Martin Johansson (orienteer, born 1984) =

Swedish orienteering competitor (born 1984)

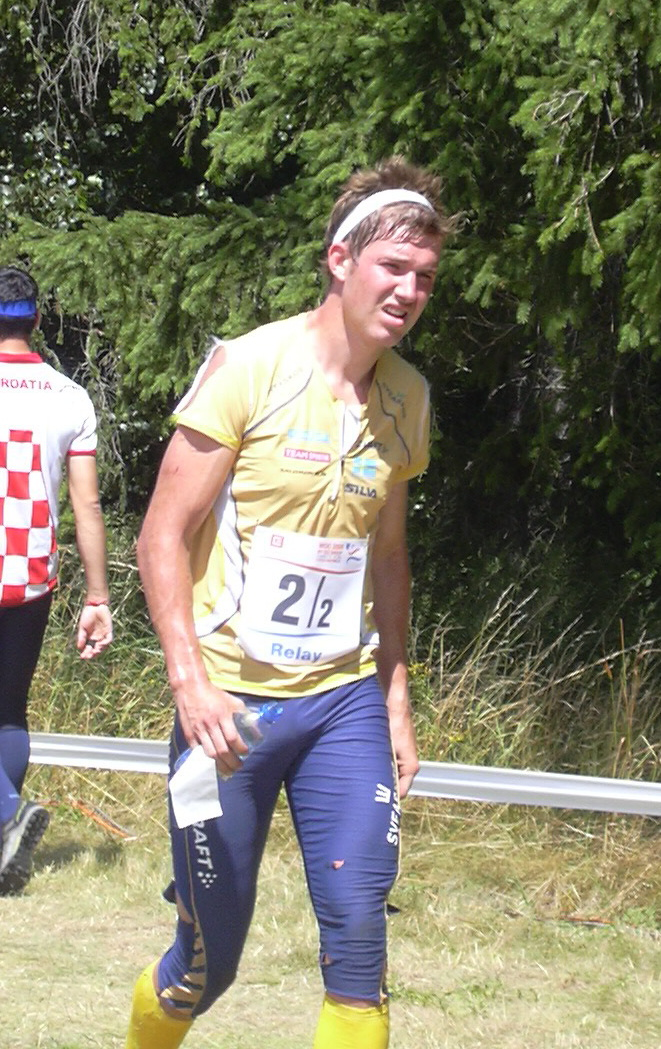
- Johansson at the World Orienteering Championships 2008

Personal information
- Nationality: Swedish
- Born: 26 September 1984 (age 41)
- Website: www.martin-johansson.se

Sport
- Sport: Orienteering; Ski orienteering Cross-country skiing
Medal record
Representing Sweden
Men's orienteering
World Championships
Bronze medal – third place	2007 Kyiv	Sprint
Bronze medal – third place	2008 Olomouc	Sprint
Junior World Championships
Gold medal – first place	2004 Gdańsk	Relay
Silver medal – second place	2004 Gdańsk	Long
Men's ski orienteering
Junior World Championships
Silver medal – second place	2004 Vuokatti	Relay

Martin Johansson (born 26 September 1984) is a Swedish orienteering, ski-orienteering, and cross-country skiing competitor, a medallist at the orienteering world championships, and a 2004 Junior World Champion in relay. He received bronze medals in sprint at the World Orienteering Championships in Kyiv 2007 and Olomouc 2008. His brother, Lars, is a member of the Rockford Icehogs

== Early life ==
Johansson was born on 26 September 1984 in Avesta, a locality of 15,000 people in Dalarna province of Sweden. He had broken a clavicle at birth, a minor defect which he still carries. Johansson participated in various sports as a child, including hockey, track and field athletics, skiing, and table tennis. Hockey was his favorite sport, but as he was small and skinny (just over 50 kg at the age of 16), he had to abandon it at the age of 13-14. He switched to skiing in winter and running in summer, combining both with orienteering and training in the club IFK Mora. Extensive training gradually his built muscles and success in local competitions, both in ski and foot orienteering. Overtraining put him out of competitions for 6 month before the 2004 season. However, he recovered and won silver in ski relay in Vuokatti 2004 Junior World Orienteering Championship, as well as gold in relay and silver in long distance at the Gdańsk 2004 Junior World foot Orienteering Championship.

== Foot orienteering ==
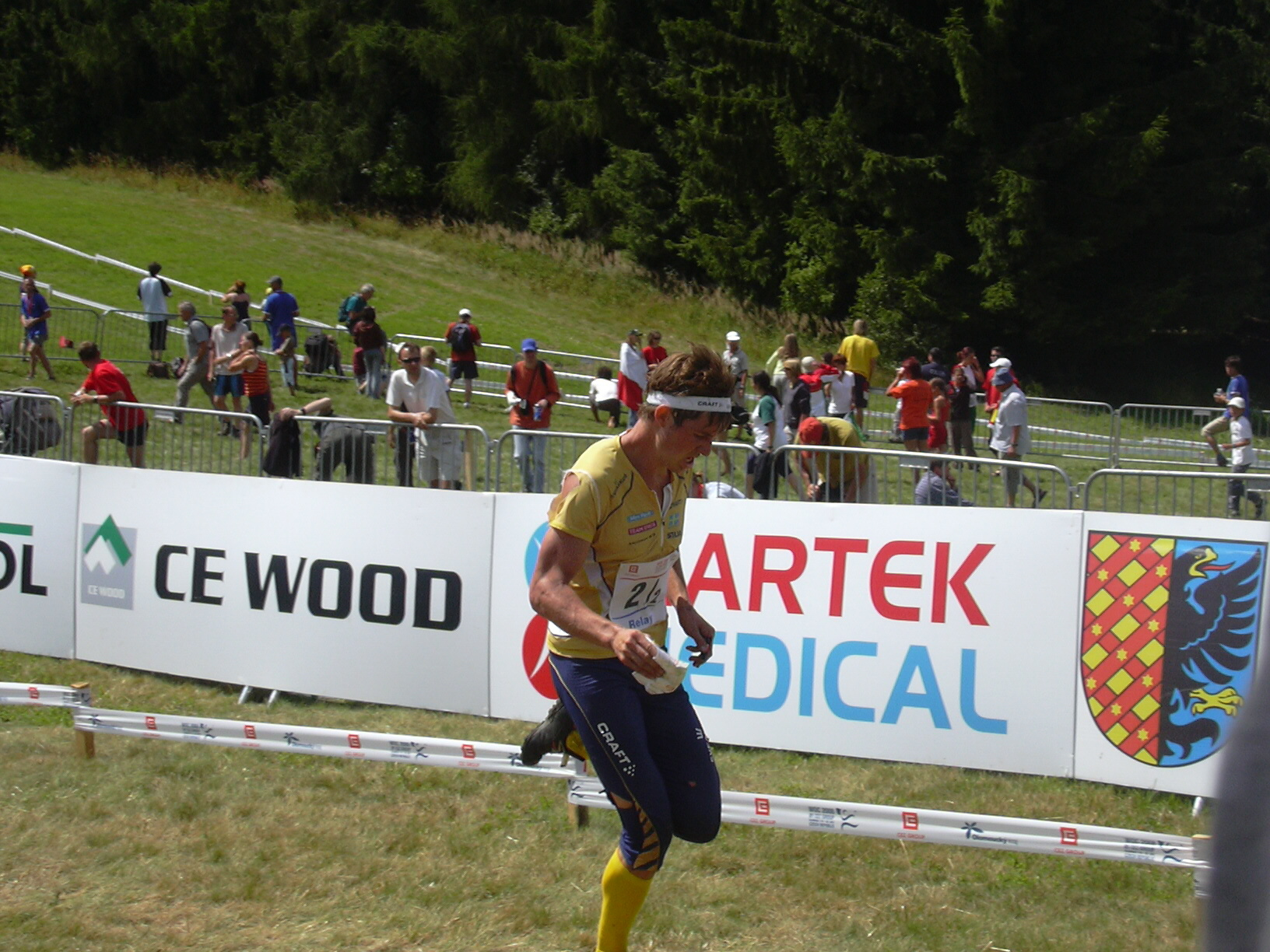
Martin Johansson (Olomouc 2008)

In 2005, Johansson debuted in adult competitions. At the 2005 World Games he finished 8th in the men's middle distance event. Although he was a Swedish champion in sprint, he was not included into the Swedish team for the 2005 World Orienteering Championships (WOC) in Aichi, however he was competing for the team in other events. At the 2007 World Orienteering Championships in Kyiv he had collapsed on the long distance run, but amazingly recovered to win bronze medal in the sprint just a few days after that. Before the 2008 World Orienteering Championships in Olomouc he had a serious toe injury, but recovered and again won a bronze medal in sprint.

=== 2009 WOC injury ===
His injuries did not stop and the most serious one came during the 2009 World Orienteering Championships in Miskolc, Hungary. He finished 5th in sprint and his next discipline was relay on 21 August. The Swedish team was battling for the victory with France and Norway, and each team put the strongest runner on the last leg. French Thierry Gueorgiou was a favorite and was leading the race, but made an orienting mistake and fell behind Johansson. At the end of the race, Johansson got injured in an event witnessed by nobody, including Johansson himself. He described it as he was running downhill and suddenly something hit him in a quadriceps. He made a few steps, but had to stop and found a big tree branch sticking out of his leg. He fell and panicked anticipating a splash of blood, but saw Gueorgiou coming and yelled for help. Gueorgiou stopped and was soon joined by Norwegian Anders Nordberg and Czech Michal Smola. Johansson told them to keep running, but they refused and started working as a team. Nordberg ran to the finish line for help, whereas Gueorgiou and Smola removed the branch, which pierced the leg to a 12-cm depth, and harnessed the wound using Gueorgiou's shirt and the straps of his GPS device. Then they carried Johansson, who passed out several times in the meantime, to the road where an ambulance car was waiting. After Johansson was on his way to the hospital, Smola, Gueorgiou and Nordberg continued the course. They jogged together finishing at 25th, 26th, and 27th places.

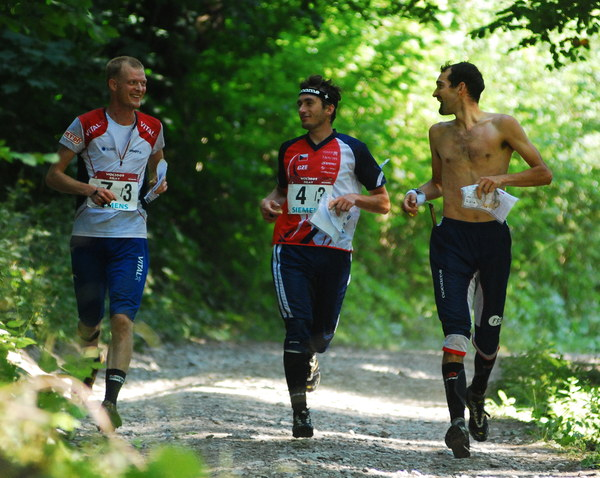
Nordberg, Smola, and Gueorgiou finishing the race after aiding Johansson; Gueorgiou has the stick in his pocket.

All of this was witnessed by spectators worldwide who were following the men's relay race, via GPS tracking shown live on the Internet. Foot orienteering races are cross-country, off-rail races and the preferred route choice often is through forests. Thus spectators have limited access on course. Spectators who were watching a map of the race in progress witnessed the strange behavior of the four leaders' GPS tracks – the tracks stopped. Soon Nordberg’s track started moving again, but it went to the road and then to the finish area. Viewer-controlled replays of the race are available for analysis, in a RouteGadget web tool.

Interpretation of International Orienteering Federation (IOF) competition rules was at issue: rule 26.13 states "The organiser must void a competition if at any point it becomes clear that circumstances have arisen which make the competition unfair or dangerous for the competitors". After much deliberation on whether or not to void the relay, the organizers declared that it stood. IOF president Åke Jacobson told Gueorgiou, Nordberg and Smola "What you did today is a great example of extreme sportsmanship and fair play. You are an inspiration for all of us!" As an orienteering relay team has 3 runners, orienteers have dubbed Gueorgiou, Nordberg and Smola "Team Fairplay".

Johansson underwent an operation to clean the infection in his wound. The operation went successfully and already on 26 August 2009 he returned home, praising Hungarian doctors.

== Ski ==
At the Junior World Ski Orienteering Championships in Vuokatti, Finland in 2004, apart from the silver in relay, Johansson also finished 5th in the long distance and 6th in the short distance disciplines.

As a strong cross-country skier, competing regularly on the FIS Cross-Country World Cup circuit in the winter seasons, he participated in the 2006 Vasaloppet – a 90-km race held annually in northwestern Dalarna, Sweden, the oldest and one of the biggest cross-country ski marathons in the world. He was in the front group, but finished around 50th place.

Johansson represented Sweden at the cross-country skiing World Championship in 2007, 2015 and 2017.

== Trivia ==
As of 28 August 2009, Johansson was placed 7th at the World foot-orienteering ranking qualification. His best results were achieved at the World Cups – two bronze medals in sprint and long run in 2007 and a gold medal the long run in Oslo 2009. His best WOC results are two bronze medals in sprint, and his best WOC achievements in other disciplines are more modest – 9th in the long run and 8th in relay, both in Olomouc 2008. He did not compete in the WOC middle run. Johansson participated in the European Orienteering Championship (foot) in Ventspils Latvia (2008) and was 5th in the long distance, 12th in sprint and 6th in relay. When free from sport, Johansson is studying construction engineering. He has two sisters and one brother.

== Cross-country skiing results ==
All results are sourced from the International Ski Federation (FIS).

=== World Championships ===
Year	Age	15 km individual	30 km skiathlon	50 km mass start	Sprint	4 × 10 km relay	Team sprint
2015	30	—	25	—	—	—	—
2017	32	—	—	19	—	—	—

=== World Cup ===
==== Season standings ====
Season	Age	Discipline standings			Ski Tour standings			
Season	Age	Overall	Distance	Sprint	Nordic Opening	Tour de Ski	World Cup Final	Ski Tour Canada
2006	21	NC	NC	—	—N/a	—N/a	—N/a	—N/a
2010	25	136	85	—	—N/a	—	—	—N/a
2013	28	143	89	NC	70	49	—	—N/a
2014	29	101	68	NC	66	28	—	—N/a
2015	30	80	57	NC	20	DNF	—N/a	—N/a
2016	31	50	33	NC	15	DNF	—N/a	30
2017	32	62	41	NC	20	—	29	—N/a
