= Espoon Suunta =

Finnish orienteering club

Espoon Suunta (EsSu) is an orienteering club based in Espoo, Finland with a strong interest in advancing the elite orienteering as well as youth orienteering and adult fitness orienteering in the western Helsinki capital area. Espoon Suunta is one of biggest Finnish orienteering clubs having 680 members (2013).

Espoon Suunta was founded in 1988, when two clubs: Espoon Rasti and Reima -34 (originally Helsinki-based Kruununhaan Reima) joined to form a new and strong club based on the developing youth work. Reima's youth team had won the Nuorten Jukola Relay in 1988 (Jukola for Youth).

Reima was one of the clubs to take part in the first Jukola Relay in 1949. EsSu's best placing in the relay has been in 1998 as 5th.

Individual achievements of EsSu members include a silver medal in World Orienteering Championships, Ms Marika Mikkola and a World Championship in Mountain Bike Orienteering, Mr Jussi Mäkilä.

Espoon Suunta has terrain maps predominantly of the coastal area of the Helsinki region and urban area maps of Espoo.

== Events organised by Espoon Suunta ==
eGames is a (inter)national orienteering competition organized annually in early August in the vicinity of Espoo.

Huippuliiga, the Finnish top orienteers' competition league, has got a leg in eGames 2008 - 2011. In 2012 Huippuliiga was not organized. In 2013 Espoon Suunta had the Huippuliiga event in April and the race was a sprint orienteering.

eCross was a cross country running event organized annually 2002–2009 in early September in Leppävaara, Espoo. Including running, Nordic walking and youth races it has a splendid reputation among the participants.
