= Alfta-Ösa OK =

Swedish sport club

Alfta-Ösa OK is a Swedish sport club from Alfta, specialising in orienteering and ski orienteering. It was established in 1980 by merging Alfta SOK and ÖSA OK.

Alfta-Ösa OK won the Venla relay in 2017 with a team consisting of Galina Vinogradova, Josefine Heikka, Sara Eskilsson and Natalia Gemperle.
