= Katarina Allberg =

Swedish and Canadian orienteering competitor

Medal record

Women's orienteering

Representing Sweden until 2002

World Championships
Silver medal – second place	2001 Tampere	Relay
Bronze medal – third place	1999 Inverness	Relay

Junior World Championships
Bronze medal – third place	1991 Berlin	Classic distance

Katarina Smith (née Allberg, born 17 January 1971) is a former Swedish, later Canadian orienteering competitor. She received a silver medal for Sweden on the relay at the 2001 World Orienteering Championships in Tampere, and a bronze medal in 1999.

She finished 8th overall in the 1998 Orienteering World Cup, and 4th in 2000. She finished 5th overall in the World Cup 2002, this time for Canada.

She received a bronze medal in the classic course at the Junior World Orienteering Championships in 1991.

She has been ranked among the top female orienteers on the North American continent by the North American Orienteering League.
