= Daniel Hubmann =

Swiss orienteering competitor

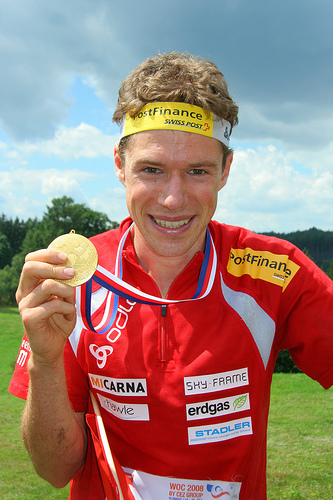
- Hubmann with gold medal at WOC 2008

Personal information
- Born: 16 April 1983 (age 43) Eschlikon

Sport
- Sport: Orienteering
- Club: Koovee; OL Regio Wil
Medal record
Men's orienteering
Representing Switzerland
World Championships
Gold medal – first place	2008 Olomouc	Long
Gold medal – first place	2009 Miskolc	Long
Gold medal – first place	2009 Miskolc	Relay
Gold medal – first place	2011 Savoie	Sprint
Gold medal – first place	2015 Inverness	Middle
Gold medal – first place	2015 Inverness	Relay
Gold medal – first place	2017 Tartu	Sprint
Gold medal – first place	2018 Riga	Sprint
Gold medal – first place	2023 Flims Laax	Relay
Silver medal – second place	2005 Aichi	Sprint
Silver medal – second place	2006 Aarhus	Sprint
Silver medal – second place	2008 Olomouc	Sprint
Silver medal – second place	2009 Miskolc	Middle
Silver medal – second place	2014 Asiago-Lavarone	Sprint
Silver medal – second place	2014 Asiago-Lavarone	Long
Silver medal – second place	2015 Inverness	Long
Silver medal – second place	2016 Stromstad	Relay
Silver medal – second place	2018 Riga	Middle
Silver medal – second place	2018 Riga	Relay
Silver medal – second place	2025 Kuopio	Relay
Bronze medal – third place	2005 Aichi	Relay
Bronze medal – third place	2008 Olomouc	Relay
Bronze medal – third place	2009 Miskolc	Sprint
Bronze medal – third place	2010 Trondheim	Middle
Bronze medal – third place	2010 Trondheim	Relay
Bronze medal – third place	2016 Stromstad	Long
Bronze medal – third place	2016 Stromstad	Sprint
Bronze medal – third place	2016 Stromstad	Middle
Bronze medal – third place	2019 Østfold	Long
World Games
Gold medal – first place	2009 Kaohsiung	Middle
Gold medal – first place	2013 Cali	Relay
Silver medal – second place	2005 Duisburg	Middle
Silver medal – second place	2009 Kaohsiung	Sprint
Silver medal – second place	2013 Cali	Middle
World Cup
Gold medal – first place	2008	WC Overall
Gold medal – first place	2009	WC Overall
Gold medal – first place	2010	WC Overall
Gold medal – first place	2011	WC Overall
Gold medal – first place	2014	WC Overall
Gold medal – first place	2015	WC Overall
Silver medal – second place	2006	WC Overall
Silver medal – second place	2013	WC Overall
Silver medal – second place	2016	WC Overall
Bronze medal – third place	2005	WC Overall
Bronze medal – third place	2007	WC Overall
Bronze medal – third place	2017	WC Overall
European Championships
Gold medal – first place	2010 Primorsko	Long
Gold medal – first place	2018 Ticino	Sprint
Silver medal – second place	2006 Otepää	Middle
Silver medal – second place	2008 Ventspils	Long
Silver medal – second place	2008 Ventspils	Sprint
Silver medal – second place	2008 Ventspils	Relay
Silver medal – second place	2010 Primorsko	Sprint
Silver medal – second place	2018 Ticino	Relay
Bronze medal – third place	2010 Primorsko	Middle
Bronze medal – third place	2012 Falun	Sprint
Junior World Championships
Gold medal – first place	2002 Alicante	Long
Gold medal – first place	2002 Alicante	Relay
Bronze medal – third place	2003 Põlva	Long
Bronze medal – third place	2003 Põlva	Relay

Daniel Hubmann (born 16 April 1983 in Eschlikon, Thurgau) is a Swiss orienteering competitor. Hubmann is the most successful male Swiss orienteer of all time, with 9 Gold medals at the World Orienteering Championships. In 2023, with his victory in the relay at the 2023 World Orienteering Championships, Hubmann became the oldest competitor to win a gold medal at the World Orienteering Championships, at the age of 40 years and 61 days. Hubmann is currently the third most successful male orienteer of all time, behind Thierry Gueorgiou and Olav Lundanes, and has won more medals in total than any other male orienteer.

== Early life ==
Hubmann started orienteering at the age of 12. Hubmann originally trained to be a carpenter from 1999-2003. He became Junior World Champion in 2002 in Alicante, both in the long distance and with the Swiss relay team. He first competed at the World Orienteering Championships for Switzerland in 2004- his first year as a senior- where he finished in the top 10 twice.

== Career ==
=== Early results ===
Hubmann received a silver medal at the Sprint World Orienteering Championships in 2005, and again in 2006, and a bronze medal in the relay event in 2005 as member of the Swiss Relay team. Hubmann turned professional in 2007.

=== 2008 ===
Hubmann won the men's overall World Cup in 2008, before Thierry Gueorgiou and Matthias Merz.

He won the long distance at the 2008 World Orienteering Championships in Olomouc (before Anders Nordberg), and finished second in the sprint event after Andrey Khramov. He received a bronze medal in the relay event with the Swiss team, together with Baptiste Rollier and Matthias Merz.

He also had success in the European Orienteering Championships, receiving three silver medals.

=== 2009 ===
In the 2009 season, Hubmann, together with teammate Matthias Merz, became the first man to take World Championship medals in all four orienteering disciplines. He accomplished this feat by earning the silver medal in the middle distance at the World Championships in Miskolc, Hungary on 19 August 2009. He followed this up a day later by winning the bronze medal in the sprint distance. In addition Hubmann anchored Kristiansand OK's relay teams to victory in both Tiomila and Jukola. After transferring to Koovee orienteering club he anchored the team to victory in Jukola in 2016 and 2018.

=== 2010-2012 ===
From 2010 to 2012, Hubmann struggled with injuries. In 2012, he missed the World Championships in his home country of Switzerland due to an achilles tendon rupture. Despite this, Hubmann still won medals in the middle distance and the sprint during this time.

=== 2013-2019 ===
From 2013 to 2019, Hubmann had his most dominant period. From 2006 to 2021, Hubmann only finished outside of the top 10 at a World Championships on one occasion- the middle distance in 2014, where he came 11th- and from 2013 to 2017 Hubmann was in the top 3 in the Orienteering World Cup every year, winning two medals in the Sprint distance and one in the Middle distance. From 2008 to 2018, either Hubmann or fellow swiss Matthias Kyburz won the world cup every year.

=== 2020- ===
In 2023, Hubmann won a gold medal in the relay in the home World Championships in Switzerland, winning with teammates Joey Hadorn and Matthias Kyburz, at the age of 40. This made Hubmann the oldest competitor to win a gold medal at the World Championships.

== World ranking ==
Hubmann was ranked no. 1 on the IOF (International Orienteering Federation) World Ranking per October 2006, and was also ranked no. 1 on the list at the end of the 2008 season (per 10 October 2008). For a brief period in 2015 he was ranked as no. 1 in both Sprint, and Classic orienteering.

== World Championship results ==
Year
Year	Age	Long	Middle	Sprint	Relay	Sprint; Relay
2004	21	—	—	9	9	—N/a
2005	22	—	29	2	3	—N/a
2006	23	—	6	2	4	—N/a
2007	24	—	7	4	5	—N/a
2008	25	1	4	2	3	—N/a
2009	26	1	2	3	1	—N/a
2010	27	7	3	7	3	—N/a
2011	28	5	—	1	4	—N/a
2012	29	injured: did not compete				
2013	30	7	5	—	4	—N/a
2014	31	2	11	2	2	—
2015	32	2	1	6	1	—
2016	33	3	3	3	2	—
2017	34	6	5	1	5	—
2018	35	4	2	1	2	—
2019	36	3	10	—N/a	6	—N/a
2020	37	—N/a	—N/a	—N/a	—N/a	—N/a
2021	38	4	8	10	—	—
2022	39	—N/a	—N/a	12	—N/a	—
2023	40	6	—	—N/a	1	—N/a
2024	41	—N/a	—N/a	10	—N/a	—
2025	42	—	10	—N/a	2	—N/a

== Personal life ==
Hubmann married his long-term partner, Annette Kindschi, in June 2015. He is the brother of Martin Hubmann. Daniel also has his own fan club which is run by New Zealand Orienteer Joseph Lynch.
