= Jørgen Rostrup =

Norwegian orienteering competitor (born 1978)

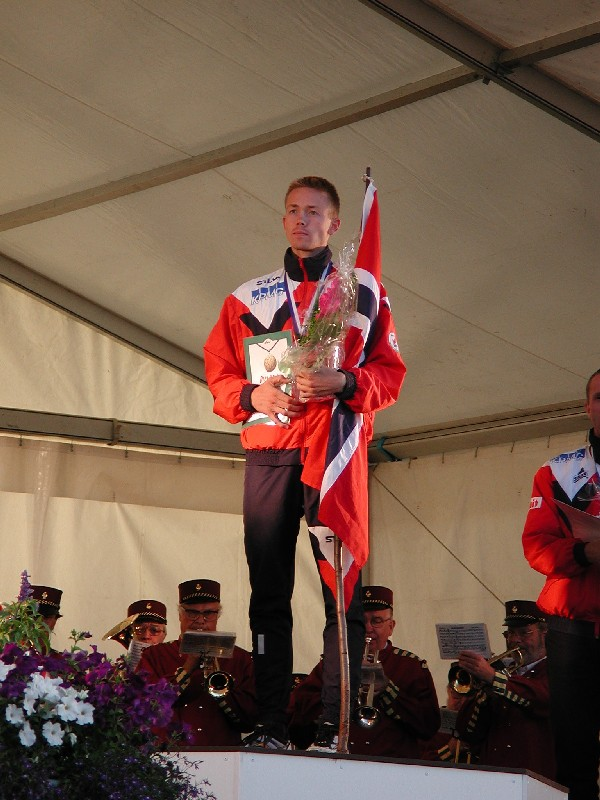
- Rostrup at WOC 2001

Personal information
- Born: 5 November 1978 (age 47) Arendal, Norway

Sport
- Sport: Orienteering
Medal record
Men's orienteering
Representing Norway
World Championships
Gold medal – first place	1999 Inverness	Short
Gold medal – first place	2001 Tampere	Classic
Gold medal – first place	2004 Västerås	Relay
Gold medal – first place	2005 Aichi	Relay
Bronze medal – third place	2001 Tampere	Short
Junior World Championships
Gold medal – first place	1997 Leopoldsburg	Short
Gold medal – first place	1998 Reims	Short
Bronze medal – third place	1998 Reims	Long

Jørgen Rostrup (born 5 November 1978) is a Norwegian orienteering competitor, two times winner of the World Orienteering Championships, Short distance in 1999, and Classic distance in 2001. He also obtained bronze on the Short distance in 2001. He is two times Relay World Champion, as member of the Norwegian winning teams in 2004 in Sweden, and 2005 in Japan. He also won the Jukola relay in 1999 and 2001.

He won gold medal twice in the Junior World Championships, in 1997 and 1998.

In 1997, he was about to enter Norway's compulsory military service, but was not accepted as his eyesight scores were too low. He instead moved to Oslo to study, and changed clubs from IK Grane to Bækkelagets SK.

Rostrup was head of the Norwegian national orienteering team between 2017 and 2020.

== Personal life ==
Rostrup was born in Arendal on 5 November 1978.
