= Thierry Gueorgiou =

French orienteering competitor

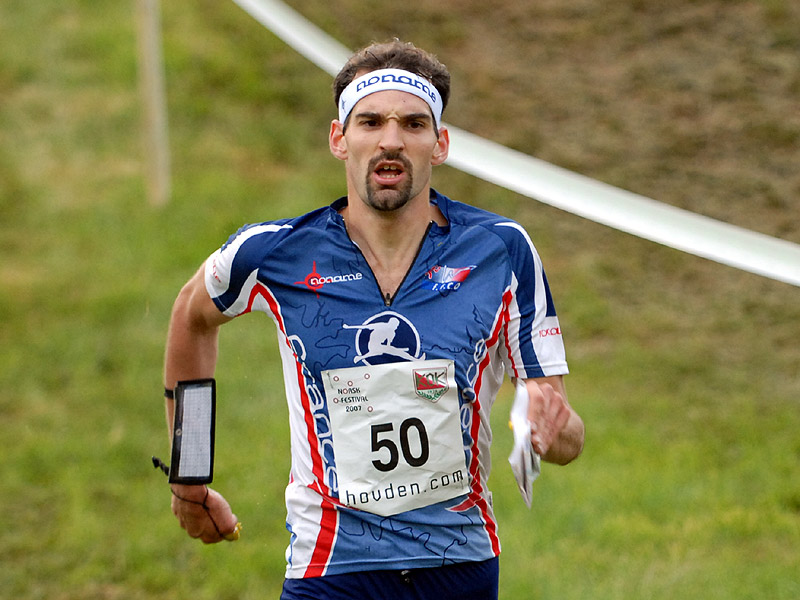
- Gueorgiou at the World Cup event in Norway 2007

Personal information
- Born: 30 March 1979 (age 47) St. Étienne, France
- Years active: 1997-2017
- Spouse: Annika Billstam
- Children: 2

Sport
- Sport: Orienteering
- Club: Kalevan Rasti; NO St-Etienne
Medal record
Men's orienteering
Representing France
World Championships
Gold medal – first place	2003 Rapperswil/Jona	Middle
Gold medal – first place	2004 Västerås	Middle
Gold medal – first place	2005 Aichi	Middle
Gold medal – first place	2007 Kyiv	Middle
Gold medal – first place	2007 Kyiv	Sprint
Gold medal – first place	2008 Olomouc	Middle
Gold medal – first place	2009 Miskolc	Middle
Gold medal – first place	2011 Savoie	Middle
Gold medal – first place	2011 Savoie	Long
Gold medal – first place	2011 Savoie	Relay
Gold medal – first place	2013 Vuokatti	Long
Gold medal – first place	2014 Asiago-Lavarone	Long
Gold medal – first place	2015 Inverness	Long
Gold medal – first place	2017 Tartu	Middle
Silver medal – second place	2005 Aichi	Relay
Silver medal – second place	2009 Miskolc	Long
Silver medal – second place	2013 Vuokatti	Middle
Silver medal – second place	2016 Stromstad	Long
Silver medal – second place	2017 Tartu	Relay
Bronze medal – third place	2003 Rapperswil/Jona	Sprint
Bronze medal – third place	2010 Trondheim	Middle
Bronze medal – third place	2010 Trondheim	Long
Bronze medal – third place	2014 Asiago-Lavarone	Relay
World Games
Gold medal – first place	2005 Duisburg	Middle
World Cup
Gold medal – first place	2006	WC Overall
Gold medal – first place	2007	WC Overall
Silver medal – second place	2005	WC Overall
Silver medal – second place	2008	WC Overall
Silver medal – second place	2009	WC Overall
Silver medal – second place	2011	WC Overall
Bronze medal – third place	2010	WC Overall
European Championships
Gold medal – first place	2004 Roskilde	Middle
Gold medal – first place	2006 Otepää	Middle
Gold medal – first place	2008 Ventspils	Middle
Silver medal – second place	2010 Primorsko	Relay
World University Championships
Gold medal – first place	2000 Roanne	Short
Gold medal – first place	2000 Roanne	Long
Gold medal – first place	2000 Roanne	Relay
Gold medal – first place	2002 Varna	Short
Gold medal – first place	2002 Varna	Relay
Junior World Championships
Silver medal – second place	1998 Reims	Long
Silver medal – second place	1999 Varna	Relay
Bronze medal – third place	1998 Reims	Relay
Bronze medal – third place	1999 Varna	Short

Thierry Gueorgiou (French pronunciation: [tjɛʁi ʒɔʁʒu]; born 30 March 1979) is a French orienteer who holds the record for gold medals won at the World Orienteering Championships for a male athlete, with 14 gold medals between 2003 and 2017. Gueorgiou has won more than 20 gold medals in international competitions, including the World Orienteering Championships (WOC) middle distance event a record eight times: 2003–2005, 2007–2009, 2011 and 2017.

In November 2016 it was announced he will become the Sweden national team head coach following his retirement at the 2017 World Championships. From October 2021 he has been the head coach of the Finnish national orienteering team.

== Early life ==
Gueorgiou was born in St. Étienne, France in 1979. Gueorgiou stated in an interview that his interest in being a World Champion in Orienteering started when he spectated the 1987 World Orienteering Championships, held in Gérardmer, which was the first time the World Championships was held in France. Gueorgiou was 8 years old at the time. In 1991, Gueorgiou won his age category at the spectator races for the 1991 World Orienteering Championships in Czechoslovakia.

Running for Fédération Française de Course d'Orientation, Gueorgiou made his debut at the 1995 Junior World Orienteering Championships in Denmark at the age of 16, coming 60th in the Short distance and 10th in the relay. He would finish his junior career by achieving two silver medals and two bronze medals in the 1998 and 1999 Junior World Championships. Gueorgiou made his senior international debut at the 1997 World Orienteering Championships in Grimstad, Norway, at the age of 18.

== World Orienteering Championships ==
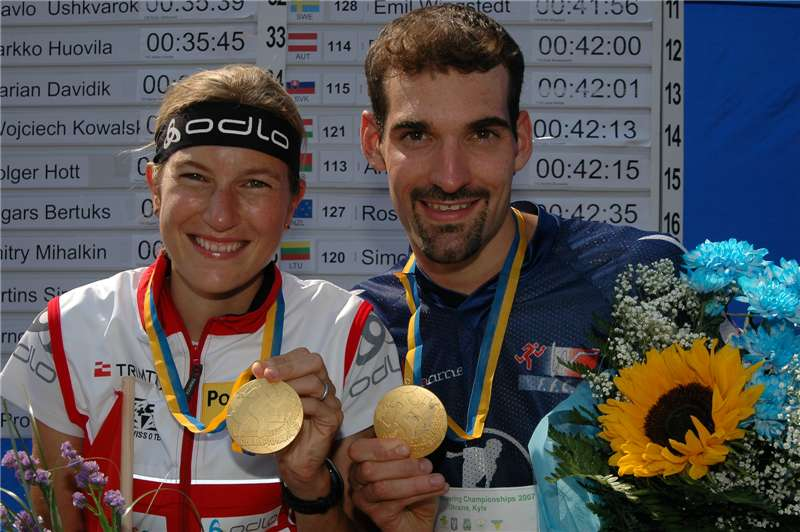
Thierry Gueorgiou and Simone Niggli-Luder, WOC 2007 middle distance champions

After his Debut in 1997, it took Gueorgiou 6 years to achieve his first medal. Gueorgiou has said that this was his hardest period in orienteering. In 2001 Gueorgiou came 19th in the Short distance after a near perfect run, which led him to make changes to his technique that would eventually lead him to multiple world championship victories.

His breakthrough season came in 2003, where he won his first gold medal in the Middle Distance. Gueorgiou has since won all 3 individual disciplines, winning the Sprint Distance for the first time in Kyiv in 2007 and the Long Distance for the first time in 2011. Gueorgiou won his most recent Long Distance gold medal in 2015, winning the gold in the Long Distance at Glen Affric ahead of Daniel Hubmann and Olav Lundanes. Thierry has won 14 gold medals at world championships.

Gueorgiou announced his retirement from international competition after the 2017 World Orienteering Championships in Estonia, where he won his final gold medal in the Middle Distance.

Gueorgiou was a member of the French relay team at WOC 2008 in Olomouc, Czech Republic. While running in a clear lead on the third leg, he suffered a bee sting on the back of his tongue. He left the course to go directly to the finish, where he collapsed, barely able to breathe. He was transported by helicopter to a hospital.

At WOC 2009 in Miskolc, Hungary, during the last leg of the relay race Gueorgiou, Anders Nordberg (Norway), and Michal Smola (Czech Republic) were close behind the lead runner, Martin Johansson (Sweden), when Johansson suffered a 12 cm deep penetrating trauma from a stick in his right thigh. While Nordberg ran for help, Gueorgiou and Smola stayed with Johansson. Gueorgiou pulled out the stick, then applied compression to the wound using his own shirt and GPS tracking harness. Gueorgiou and Smola then carried Johansson to a road. Nordberg brought a physician there.

== Style of orienteering ==
Gueorgiou has stated in interviews that his style is "Full speed, no mistakes". Gueorgiou is noted for his incredible map- reading, and is frequently named as "The King of Middle Distance" for his multiple victories at world championships. Alongside his victories in Classic foot orienteering, Gueorgiou was the 2006 European champion in trail orienteering.

== Personal life ==
Gueorgiou's nickname is Tero and he is commonly known as Tero Kettunen in Finland and Terje Gundersen in Norway. He currently lives in Uppsala, Sweden with his partner elite orienteer Annika Billstam. Gueorgiou and Billstam met in 2011 when Gueorgiou was asked to speak to members of the Swedish orienteering team. Gueorgiou has two children with Billstam, named Ines and Leon. His brother, Remi Gueorgiou, also competed for France in Orienteering, coming 36th in the Middle Distance at the 2004 World Orienteering Championships (won by Thierry). Remi was born in 1975.

== Clubs ==
Gueorgiou runs for two orienteering clubs, the French NO St-Etienne and the Finnish Kalevan Rasti. With Kalevan Rasti he has won the Jukola Relay five times (2004, 2005, 2007, 2013 and 2014).

== World Championship results ==
Year
Year	Age	Long	Middle	Sprint	Relay	Sprint; Relay
1997	18	—	50	—N/a	12	—N/a
1999	20	—	24	—N/a	12	—N/a
2001	22	—	18	12	11	—N/a
2003	24	—	1	3	14	—N/a
2004	25	—	1	5	7	—N/a
2005	26	7	1	—	2	—N/a
2006	27	8	4	—	11	—N/a
2007	28	—	1	1	6	—N/a
2008	29	—	1	5	DSQ	—N/a
2009	30	2	1	—	25	—N/a
2010	31	3	3	—	8	—N/a
2011	32	1	1	—	1	—N/a
2012	33	—	4	—	5	—N/a
2013	34	1	2	—	8	—N/a
2014	35	1	DSQ	—	3	—
2015	36	1	7	—	—	—
2016	37	2	4	—	6	—
2017	38	—	1	—	2	—
