= Kjetil Bjørlo =

Norwegian orienteering competitor

Personal information
- Born: 27 March 1968 (age 58)

Sport
- Sport: Orienteering
- Club: NTHI; Halden SK
Medal record
Men's orienteering
Representing Norway
World Championships
Bronze medal – third place	1997 Grimstad	Classic
Bronze medal – third place	1997 Grimstad	Relay

Kjetil Bjørlo (born 27 March 1968) is a Norwegian orienteering competitor, individual bronze medalist in the classic course at the 1997 World Orienteering Championships in Grimstad.

He received a bronze medal in the relay event in 1997, together with Håvard Tveite, Bjørnar Valstad and Petter Thoresen. He won the 1989 Jukola relay with NTHI, and the 1998 and 2000 editions of the Jukola relay with the club Halden SK.

Bjørlo has later been an expert commentator for the Norwegian broadcaster NRK, for instance at the 2024 European Orienteering Championships.
