= Marika Mikkola =

Finnish orienteering competitor

Personal information
- Nationality: Finnish
- Born: 1971 (age 54–55)

Sport
- Sport: Orienteering
Medal record
Women's orienteering
Representing Finland
World Championships
Gold medal – first place	2001 Tampere	Relay
Silver medal – second place	2001 Tampere	Classic
Silver medal – second place	2004 Västerås	Relay
Bronze medal – third place	2004 Västerås	Long

Marika Mikkola is a Finnish orienteering competitor and World champion. She won a gold medal at the 2001 World Orienteering Championships in Tampere and a silver medal in Västerås 2004 with the Finnish relay team. She also received an individual silver medal in 2001 and bronze medal in 2004 in the long distance event. Marika's clubs have been Reima-34, Espoon Suunta, Angelniemen Ankkuri, Bækkelagets SK, and Kalevan Rasti.

== See also ==
- Finnish orienteers
- List of orienteers
- List of orienteering events
