= Outi Borgenström-Anjala =

Finnish orienteering competitor

Medal record

Women's orienteering

Representing Finland

World Championships
Gold medal – first place	1978 Kongsberg	Relay
Gold medal – first place	1979 Tampere	Individual
Silver medal – second place	1976 Aviemore	Relay
Silver medal – second place	1981 Thun	Relay
Bronze medal – third place	1974 Silkeborg	Individual

Outi Borgenström (formerly Borgenström-Anjala; born 24 January 1956 in Tampere) is a Finnish orienteering competitor. She won the 1979 Individual World Orienteering Championships, and took bronze medal 1974. She is also Relay World Champion, as a member of the Finnish winning team 1978 (silver 1976 and 1981).

Borgenström and orienteer Ari Anjala have a son, Topi Anjala, who is also an orienteer.

== See also ==
- Finnish orienteers
- List of orienteers
- List of orienteering events
