= Gunilla Svärd =

Swedish orienteering competitor

Medal record

Women's orienteering

Representing Sweden

World Championships
Gold medal – first place	1997 Grimstad	Relay
Gold medal – first place	2004 Västerås	Relay
Silver medal – second place	2001 Tampere	Relay
Silver medal – second place	2003 Rapperswil/Jona	Relay
Bronze medal – third place	1999 Inverness	Relay
Bronze medal – third place	2001 Tampere	Middle

Junior World Championships
Silver medal – second place	1990 Älvsbyn	Relay

Gunilla Svärd (born 26 March 1970) is a Swedish orienteering competitor. She is two times Relay World Champion as a member of the Swedish winning team in 1997 and 2004, as well as having silver medals from 2001 and 2003, and a bronze medal from 1999. She obtained bronze in the Short distance World Championship in 2001. Svärd won in the Overall World Cup in 1996, and she has obtained three victories in individual World Cup races. She also has a gold medal from 2002 in the European Orienteering Championships (Middle distance), and more than twenty-five medals from the Swedish Championships.
