= Ari Anjala =

Finnish orienteer

Medal record

Men's orienteering

Representing Finland

World Championships
Silver medal – second place	1979 Tampere	Relay
Bronze medal – third place	1981 Thun	Relay
Bronze medal – third place	1991 Mariánské Lázně	Relay

Ari Anjala (born 31 May 1958) is a Finnish orienteering competitor, three times medalist in the relay at the World Orienteering Championships.

He received a silver medal in the relay event in 1979, a bronze medal in 1981, and a bronze medal in 1991.

Anjala and orienteer Outi Borgenström have a son, Topi Anjala, who is also an orienteer.

Anjala won the Jukola relay in 1977.

== See also ==
- Finnish orienteers
- List of orienteers
- List of orienteering events
