= Chris Terkelsen =

Danish orienteering competitor

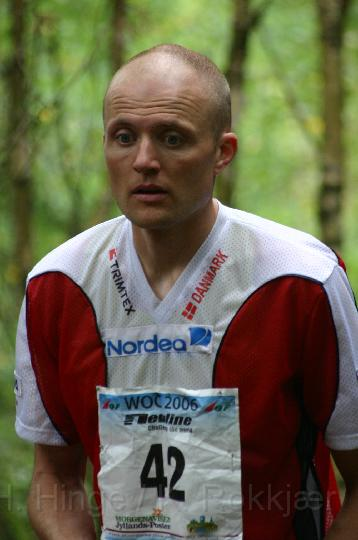
- Terkelsen at WOC 2006

Personal information
- Nationality: Danish
- Born: 16 February 1972 (age 54)

Sport
- Sport: Orienteering
Medal record
Men's orienteering
Representing Denmark
World Championships
Gold medal – first place	1997 Grimstad	Relay
Silver medal – second place	2005 Aichi	Middle
World Cup
Gold medal – first place	1998	WC Overall
European Championships
Silver medal – second place	2004 Roskilde	Relay
Junior World Championships
Silver medal – second place	1992 Jyväskylä	Classic

Chris Terkelsen (born 16 February 1972) is a Danish orienteering competitor and World champion. He won a gold medal in the 1997 World Orienteering Championships in Grimstad with the Danish Relay team. He received a silver medal in the 2005 World Orienteering Championships in Aichi (middle distance). He won the overall World Cup in 1998, and received a silver medal in the 2004 European Championships with the Danish relay team. Terkelsen won the 1997, 1998 and 2000 editions of the Jukola relay.

== See also ==
- Danish orienteers
- List of orienteers
- List of orienteering events
