= Juha Peltola =

Finnish orienteer (born 1975)

Medal record

Men's orienteering

Representing Finland

World Championships
Gold medal – first place	2001 Tampere	Relay
Silver medal – second place	1997 Grimstad	Relay
Silver medal – second place	1999 Inverness	Short
Silver medal – second place	1999 Inverness	Relay

Juha Peltola (born 12 January 1975) is a Finnish orienteering competitor and World Champion. He participated on the Finnish winning team in the 2001 World Orienteering Championships. He also has a silver medal from the 1999 Short Distance, and silver medals from the 1997 and 1999 Team Events.

== See also ==
- Finnish orienteers
- List of orienteers
- List of orienteering events
