= Topi Anjala =

Finnish orienteering competitor

Medal record

Men's Orienteering

Representing Finland

World Championships
Bronze medal – third place	2009 Miskolc	Relay

Topi Anjala (born 5 July 1984) is a Finnish orienteering competitor. He represented Finland at the 2009 World Orienteering Championships in Miskolc, where he placed 15th in the long distance, and won a bronze medal in the relay, together with Tero Föhr and Mats Haldin. His career best personal best is seventh place in the long distance at the 2008 World Championships in the Czech Republic. Anjala has won the Jukola relay in 2016 and 2018.

Anjala's parents Ari Anjala and Outi Borgenström are also orienteers.

Anjala won the Jukola relay twice in 2016 and 2018.
