= Radek Novotný =

Czech orienteering competitor (born 1974)

Medal record

Men's orienteering

Representing Czech Republic

World Championships
Bronze medal – third place	2001 Tampere	Relay

Radek Novotný (born 20 October 1974, Hradec Králové) is a Czech orienteering competitor. He received a bronze medal in the relay at the 2001 World Orienteering Championships with the Czech team.

== See also ==
- Czech orienteers
- List of orienteers
- List of orienteering events
