= Marianne Andersen =

Norwegian orienteer

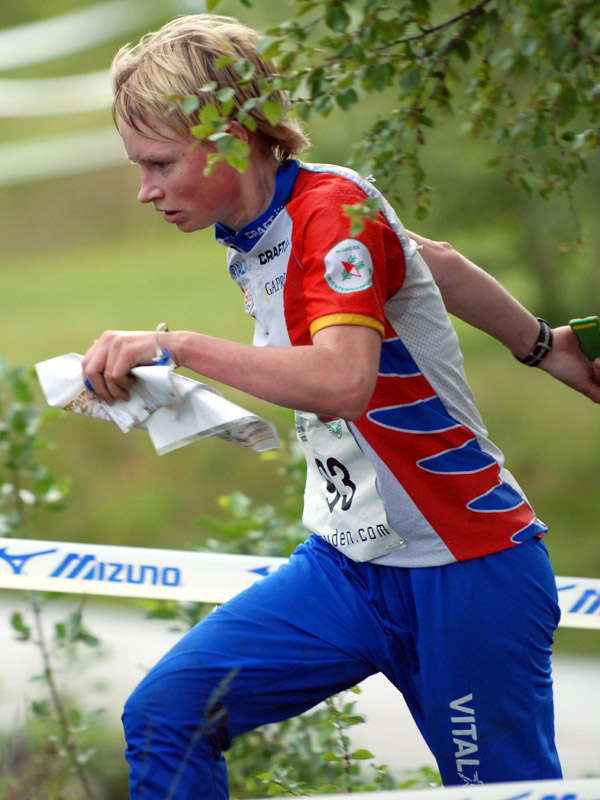
- Marianne Andersen (Hovden 2007)

Personal information
- Nationality: Norwegian
- Born: 26 March 1980 (age 46) Drammen, Norway

Sport
- Sport: Orienteering
Medal record
Women's orienteering
Representing Norway
World Championships
Gold medal – first place	2009 Miskolc	Relay
Silver medal – second place	2005 Aichi	Relay
Silver medal – second place	2006 Aarhus	Long distance
Silver medal – second place	2006 Aarhus	Middle distance
Silver medal – second place	2008 Olomouc	Long
Silver medal – second place	2009 Miskolc	Long
Silver medal – second place	2009 Miskolc	Middle distance
Silver medal – second place	2010 Trondheim	Long
Silver medal – second place	2010 Trondheim	Relay
Silver medal – second place	2017 Tartu	Middle
Bronze medal – third place	2007 Kyiv	Middle distance
Bronze medal – third place	2007 Kyiv	Relay
Bronze medal – third place	2010 Trondheim	Sprint
Bronze medal – third place	2010 Trondheim	Middle
Bronze medal – third place	2023 Grisons	Relay
European Championships
Silver medal – second place	2004 Roskilde	Relay
Silver medal – second place	2006 Otepää	Sprint
Silver medal – second place	2006 Otepää	Middle distance
World Cup
Silver medal – second place	2006	WC Overall
Silver medal – second place	2009	WC Overall

Marianne Andersen (born 26 March 1980 in Drammen) is a Norwegian orienteering competitor. She has won twelve individual medals in the world and European championships, as well as winning nine national championships. In 2017 she won a silver medal in the middle distance after seven years without a medal (mainly due to injury).

== World and European championships ==
Andersen won one gold medal, six silver medals and two bronze medals in the 2005, 2006, 2007, 2008, and 2009 World Orienteering Championships. She received further medals at the 2010 World Championships in her home country of Norway. In the European Championships, she achieved a silver medal in the 2004 European Championships with the Norwegian relay team, and two individual silver medals in the 2006 European Championships (Sprint and Middle distance). Andersen was then effectively away from the sport from 2011 to 2015, struggling with injury. She made a comeback in 2016, her reward being a WOC silver medal at Middle Distance. As of 2017, she has 14 WOC medals (1 gold, 9 silver and 4 bronze).

She placed 10th in long distance at the 2023 World Orienteering Championships, and won a bronze medal in the relay with the Norwegian team.

== World cup ==
Andersen obtained one victory (middle distance, Auvergne, 2006), eleven second places and four third places in the World cup events, during the seasons 2005–2009. She finished second in the overall world cup in 2006, and second in 2009.

== National championships ==
Andersen has won nine gold medals, three silver medals and four bronze medals in the National championships, and was awarded the King's cup in 2004 and 2007. She has represented the clubs Nydalens SK, NTNUI and Konnerud IL. In 2019, she won the Jukola Relay with Fredrikstad SK.
