= Johanna Asklöf =

Finnish orienteer

Medal record

Women's orienteering

Representing Finland

World Championships
Gold medal – first place	2001 Tampere	Relay
Silver medal – second place	1993 West Point	Relay
Silver medal – second place	1999 Inverness	Relay
Silver medal – second place	2001 Tampere	Sprint
Bronze medal – third place	1999 Inverness	Classic

Junior World Championships
Gold medal – first place	1991 Berlin	Relay
Silver medal – second place	1991 Berlin	Short
Silver medal – second place	1992 Jyväskylä	Classic
Silver medal – second place	1992 Jyväskylä	Relay

Johanna Asklöf (née Tiira, born 25 August 1972) is a Finnish orienteering competitor and World champion.

She received a silver medal in the relay event at the 1993 World Orienteering Championships in West Point, USA, together with Kirsi Tiira, Annika Viilo and Eija Koskivaara. She earned a silver medal with the Finnish relay team at the 1999 World Championships in Inverness, and also an individual bronze medal on the Classic distance. She won a gold medal at the 2001 World Orienteering Championships in Tampere with the Finnish relay team, and received a silver medal on the Sprint distance.

She became Junior World Champion with the Finnish relay team in 1991.

== See also ==
- Finnish orienteers
- List of orienteers
- List of orienteering events
