= Frauke Schmitt Gran =

Medal record

Women's orienteering

Representing Germany

World Championships
Bronze medal – third place	1999 Inverness	Short

Frauke Schmitt Gran (born 12 March 1969) is a German orienteer and the first to obtain a medal in the World Orienteering Championships, a bronze in the short course at the 1999 event in Inverness, behind Yvette Baker and Lucie Böhm.
