= Anders Nordberg =

Norwegian orienteer (born 1978)

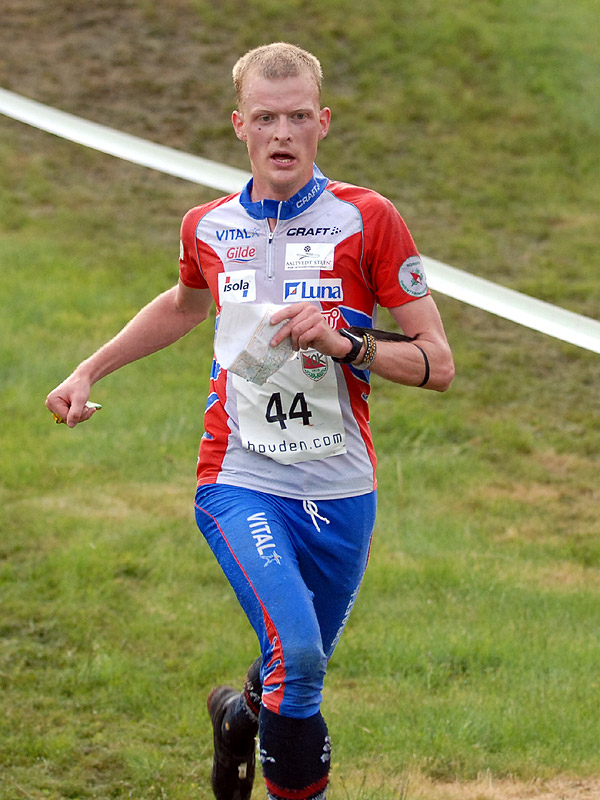
- Nordberg in 2007

Personal information
- Nationality: Norwegian
- Born: 17 February 1978 (age 48) Skien, Norway

Sport
- Sport: Orienteering
Medal record
Men's orienteering
Representing Norway
World Orienteering Championships
Silver medal – second place	2008 Olomouc	Long
Silver medal – second place	2010 Trondheim	Long
Silver medal – second place	2011 Savoie	Relay
Bronze medal – third place	2004 Västerås	Middle distance
Bronze medal – third place	2007 Kyiv	Long distance
Nordic Championships
Gold medal – first place	2005	Long distance
Gold medal – first place	2005	Middle distance
Gold medal – first place	2005	Relay

Anders Nordberg (born 17 February 1978) is a Norwegian orienteering competitor. He received a bronze medal at the 2004 World Orienteering Championship, and again a bronze medal in 2007. He finished second in the overall World Cup 2007.

== Biography ==
Nordberg was born in Skien, a small town of 50,000 people in Telemark county, Norway. He had competed in cross-country skiing, track and field athletics, and football. He started training in orienteering relatively late, at the age of 14, and had no orienteering competitors in his family. However, already the next year he won a silver medal in the Norwegian youth championship in Hovedløpet.

After finishing school in 1997 he served for a year in the Royal Norwegian Navy. Then he began his studies at Agder University College, first for computer engineer (1998–2001) and then changed to the business administration and economics program (Siviløkonom, 2001 — 2005). In 2005, Nordberg completed his studies and became a professional sportsman, occasionally doing various part-time jobs. Before the 2006 World Orienteering Championship (WOC), he moved from Skien to Oslo. During the preparation, he trained in three high-altitude camps — two in winter in South Africa and one in summer in Italy. However, for the next WOC in 2007 he trained in Norway only. In orienteering, Nordberg specializes in long distance events. He is a supporter of Norwegian club Odd Grenland and British Liverpool F.C.

== Nordic and national championships ==
Nordberg collected three gold medals out of total four at Nordic championship in 2005, and received a silver medal in 1997. He won a gold medal at the 1996 National "night" championship, a silver medal in 2003, and a bronze medal in 2004. He was first at the 2006 National championships, and again in 2007 was awarded the King's cup. He was elected Orienteer of the year 2007 by Norwegian sports journalists.

== International championships ==
Nordberg had started competing internationally only at the age of 25 at the Nordic Championship 2003 in Sweden, but failed to win any medal. The next year, he finished third in Västerås 2004 World Orienteering Championship (WOC) in the middle distance run. He also got a bronze medal in Kyiv 2007 WOC in the long distance event. By September 2009, his best career achievement is a silver medal at Olomouc 2008 WOC in the long distance run. Nordberg also competed in other orienteering disciplines with the best results being 11th in sprint at Vasteras 2004 WOC and 4th in relay at Kyiv 2007 Championship. He had participated in several European championships, but never got onto the podium — his best European result was 4th in relay in Roskilde 2004, Denmark.

=== Martin Johansson 2009 WOC injury ===
At WOC 2009 in Miskolc, Hungary, during the last leg of the relay race Thierry Gueorgiou (France), Michal Smola (Czech Republic) and Nordberg were close behind the lead runner, Martin Johansson (Sweden), when Johansson suffered a 12 cm deep penetrating trauma from a stick in his right thigh. While Nordberg ran for help, Gueorgiou and Smola pulled out the stick, harnessed the wound using a shirt and a GPS tracking strap and then carried Johansson to a road where Nordberg brought a physician to.

== Clubs ==
Nordberg has represented the clubs Skien OK (1993–1999), Kristiansand OK (1999–2005), Bækkelagets SK (2006–2007), Halden SK (2008-2011) and Vaajakosken Terä from 2011. He won the Jukola relay in 2010.
