= Baptiste Rollier =

Swiss orienteering competitor

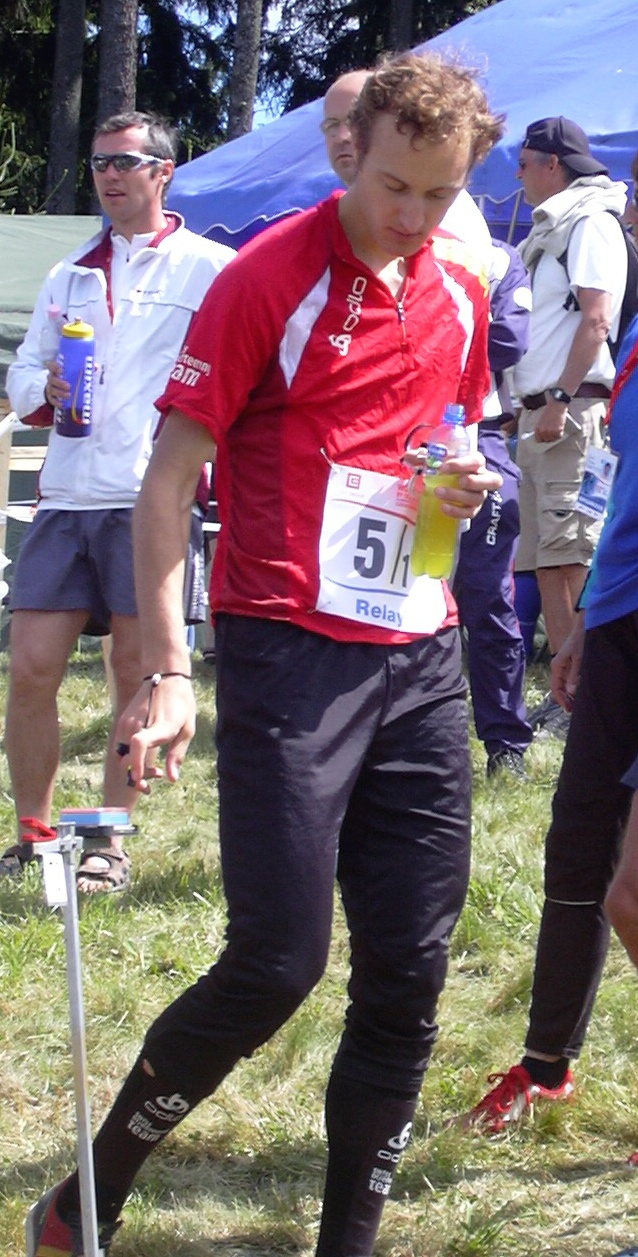
- Baptiste Rollier at WOC 2008

Medal record

Men's orienteering

Representing Switzerland

World Championships
Bronze medal – third place	2008 Olomouc	Relay
Gold medal – first place	2009 Miskolc	Relay

European Championships
Silver medal – second place	2008 Ventspils	Relay

Nordic Championships
Gold medal – first place	2007 Bornholm	Relay

Baptiste Rollier (born 27 August 1982) is a Swiss orienteering competitor.

He received a silver medal with the Swiss team in the relay event at the 2008 European Orienteering Championships in Ventspils, with Matthias Merz and Daniel Hubmann. He finished 6th in the long course.

He finished 11th in the long course at the 2007 World Orienteering Championships in Kyiv.

Rollier retired from international orienteering at the end of 2016. Rollier competes in club competitions with Norwegian club Kristiansand OK.

== Club competitions ==
In the 2008 season Rollier was a member of the Norwegian club Kristansand OK, and won the Tiomila relay with this club in 2008. He was previously a member of the Finnish club Vehkalahden Veikot.
