= Reeta-Mari Kolkkala =

Finnish orienteering competitor

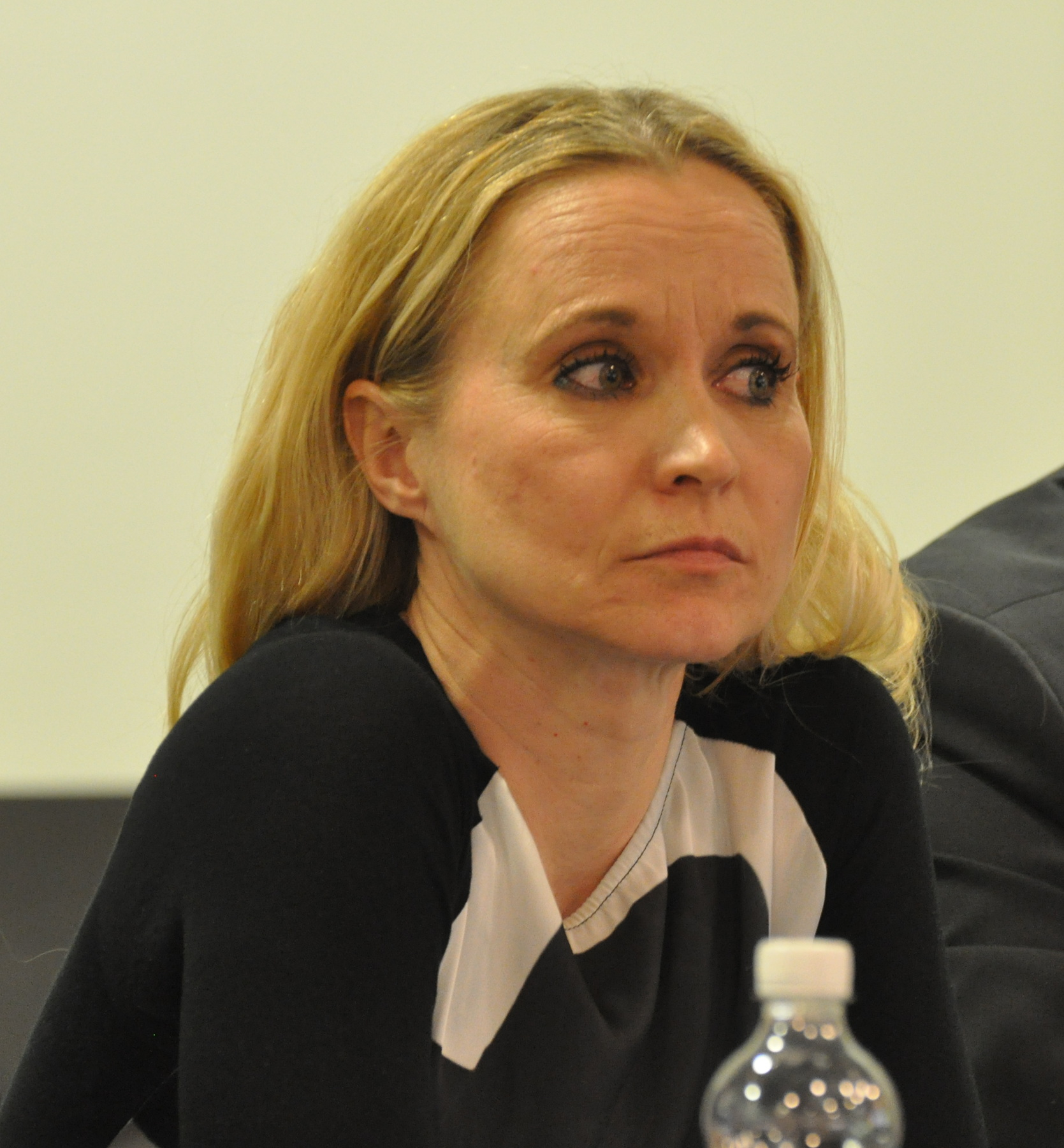
- Kolkkala in 2015

Medal record

Women's orienteering

Representing Finland

World Championships
Gold medal – first place	1995 Detmold	Relay
Gold medal – first place	2001 Tampere	Relay
Silver medal – second place	1999 Inverness	Relay
Bronze medal – third place	2001 Tampere	Classic

Reeta-Mari Kolkkala (born 21 January 1969) is a Finnish orienteering competitor and world champion.

She won a gold medal in the relay event at the 1995 World Orienteering Championships in Detmold, finished 4th in 1997, received a silver medal in 1999, and another gold medal in Tampere in 2001 with the Finnish relay team. She finished 6th in the classic course in 1999. She received an individual bronze medal in the classic course in Tampere in 2001, and finished 5th in the sprint and 5th in the short course.

== World cup ==
She finished 9th overall in the World cup 1994, 15th in 1996, 4th in 1998, and 7th in 2000.

== See also ==
- Finnish orienteers
- List of orienteers
- List of orienteering events
