= Bernt Bjørnsgaard =

Norwegian orienteer

Medal record

Men's orienteering

Representing Norway

World Championships
Gold medal – first place	1999 Inverness	Relay
Silver medal – second place	2001 Tampere	Relay

Junior World Championships
Silver medal – second place	1992 Jyväskylä	Short
Silver medal – second place	1993 Kastelruth	Short
Silver medal – second place	1993 Kastelruth	Relay

Bernt Bjørnsgaard (born 1973) is a Norwegian orienteering competitor and World champion.

== Biography ==
Bjørnsgaard won a gold medal in the relay at the 1999 World Orienteering Championships in Inverness with the Norwegian team, along with Tore Sandvik, Petter Thoresen and Bjørnar Valstad. He placed 7th in the classic distance, and 10th in the short distance.

He won a silver medal in the 2001 World Orienteering Championships in Tampere.

Bjørnsgaard won two individual national titles in orienteering, winning the middle distance in 1998 and 2001. He was awarded the Kongepokal (King's Cup) trophy at the national championships twice, in 1998 and 2001.

He represented Halden SK. He won the Jukola relay in 1997, 1998, 2000 and 2002.
