= Kristiansand OK =

Norwegian orienteering club

Kristiansand OK is an Orienteering club based in Kristiansand, Norway, which competes in the Jukola and Tiomila relays. The club is known for its international representation, including Swiss runners Martin Hubmann and Daniel Hubmann as well as Baptiste Rollier and veteran British runner Jon Duncan. The club last won the Jukola relay in 2015.
