= 2001 World Orienteering Championships =

2001 edition of the World Orienteering Championships

- Host city: Tampere
- Country: Finland
- Events: 8

The 2001 World Orienteering Championships, the 19th World Orienteering Championships, were held in Tampere, Finland, 26 July – 4 August 2001.

The championships had eight events; sprint (new) for men and women, the classic distance (formerly called individual) for men and women, the short distance for men and women, and relays for men and women.

== Medalists ==
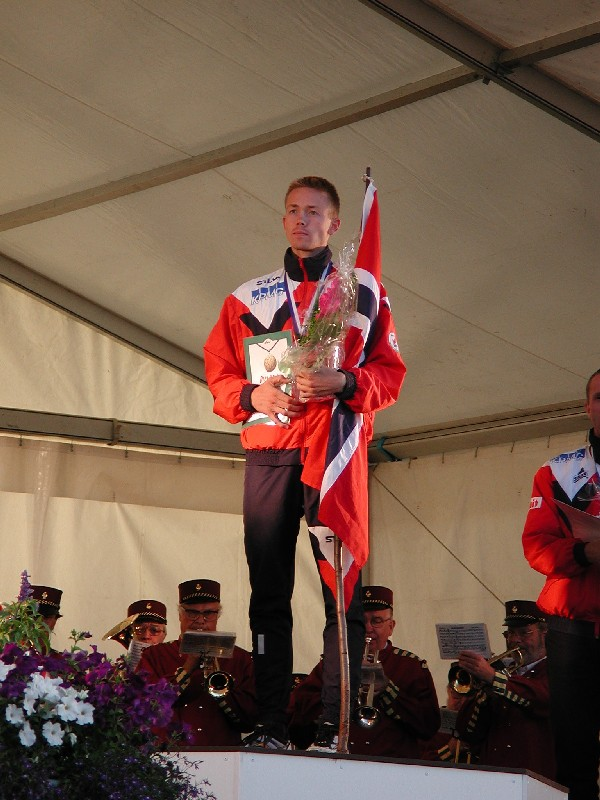
Jørgen Rostrup at the 2001 World Championships.

Event	Gold		Silver	Bronze
Men's sprint	Jimmy Birklin (SWE)	10.55,9	Pasi Ikonen (FIN)	Jörgen Olsson (SWE)
Women's sprint	Vroni König-Salmi (SUI)	10.54,9	Johanna Asklöf (FIN)	Simone Luder (SUI)
Men's classic distance	Jørgen Rostrup (NOR)	1.29.43	Jani Lakanen (FIN)	Carl Henrik Bjørseth (NOR)
Women's classic distance	Simone Luder (SUI)	1.14.57	Marika Mikkola (FIN)	Reeta Kolkkala (FIN)
Men's short distance	Pasi Ikonen (FIN)	23.41	Tore Sandvik (NOR)	Jørgen Rostrup (NOR)
Women's short distance	Hanne Staff (NOR)	25.41	Jenny Johansson (SWE)	Gunilla Svärd (SWE)
Men's relay	Finland (FIN): Jani Lakanen; Jarkko Huovila; Juha Peltola; Janne Salmi	2.48.53	Norway (NOR): Bernt Bjørnsgaard; Carl Henrik Bjørseth; Tore Sandvik; Bjørnar Valstad	Czech Republic (CZE): Michal Horáček; Michal Jedlicka; Radek Novotny; Rudolf Ropek
Women's relay	Finland (FIN): Reeta Kolkkala; Liisa Anttila; Marika Mikkola; Johanna Asklöf	2.37.01	Sweden (SWE): Katarina Allberg; Jenny Johansson; Cecilia Nilsson; Gunilla Svärd	Norway (NOR): Birgitte Husebye; Linda Antonsen; Elisabeth Ingvaldsen; Hanne Staff
