= Vehkalahden Veikot =

Finnish sports club

Vehkalahden Veikot is a sports club in Hamina founded in 1911 with the sports: orienteering, cross-country skiing, athletics and pesäpallo.

== Orienteering ==
The club won the Jukola relay in 1983 and 2006. Tero Föhr, Marc Lauenstein, Simo-Pekka Fincke, Baptiste Rollier and Anni-Maija Fincke have represented the club.

== Awards ==
The club received the award Pohjola-palkinto Hyvälle Seuralle in at the Urheilugaala 2012 for its varied and good activities.
