= Olle Kärner =

Estonian orienteering competitor

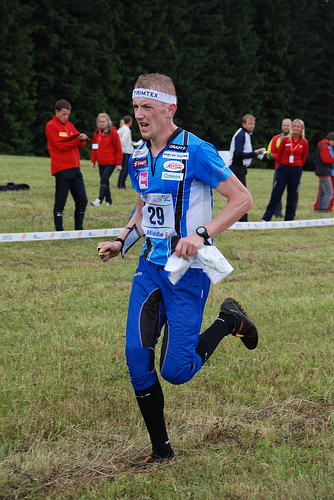
- Olle Kärner at WOC 2008

Medal record

Men's orienteering

Representing Estonia

European Championships
Bronze medal – third place	2006 Otepää	Long

Nordic Championships
Silver medal – second place	2005 Notodden	Long

Olle Kärner (born November 24, 1977, in Tartu) is an Estonian orienteering competitor from Tartu. He received a bronze medal in the long distance at the 2006 European Orienteering Championships in Otepää.

== International results ==
His best result in the World Orienteering Championships is 5th place in the long distance in 2006. He received a silver medal in the open Nordic championships in 2005. He won the Jukola relay in 2008.

== See also ==
- List of orienteers
- List of orienteering events
