= Halden SK =

Norwegian Sports Club

Logo.

Halden Skiklubb is a Norwegian sports club from Halden, founded on 12 January 1891. It has sections for orienteering, skiing, and cycling.

The orienteering in Halden was first organized in the multi-sports club Halden IL, founded 1912. Among its prominent orienteers are Jarkko Huovila, Emil Wingstedt, Anne Margrethe Hausken, Tore Sandvik, Petter Thoresen, Bernt Bjørnsgaard, Anders Nordberg and Olav Lundanes. Halden is known for attracting international orienteers including Elena Roos.

In orienteering Halden SK has won Jukola relay seven times, latest 2011.
