= Karl von Smola =

Karl Freiherr von Smola (15 November 1802 in České Budějovice - 14 February 1862 in Štýrský Hradec) was an Austrian officer.

== Life ==
His father was Josef von Smola (1764–1820), officer and holder of the Knight's Cross of the Military Order of Maria Theresa. He graduated from Theresianischen Ritterakademie in Vienna and in 1817 he joined the artillery, just as his father. In 1819 he rose to the rank of lieutenant, in 1827 to the rank of first lieutenant, and in 1840 to the rank of major. In 1847 he rose to the rank of lieutenant colonel, and subsequently in 1848 to the rank of colonel, and he became chief of staff. Afterwards, he was seriously injured at the town of Udine and he lost one leg. In 1849, he was decorated with the Knight's Cross of the Order of Maria Theresia, just as his father earlier. He continued to work at the general staff until 1852 when he became professor of military organization and military geography. From 1853, he worked as director of the Polytechnic Institute in Vienna, retiring in 1858 with the rank of major general.
