= Jörgen Olsson (orienteer) =

Swedish orienteering competitor (born 1971)

Medal record

Men's orienteering

Representing Sweden

World Championships
Bronze medal – third place	1999 Inverness	Relay
Bronze medal – third place	2001 Tampere	Sprint

European Championships
Bronze medal – third place	2000 Truskavets	Relay

Jörgen Olsson (born 11 October 1971) is a Swedish orienteering competitor. He received a bronze medal in the relay event at the 1999 World Orienteering Championships, and received a bronze medal in the sprint event at the 2001 World Orienteering Championships in Tampere.
