= Helsingin Suunnistajat =

Finnish orienteering club

Helsingin Suunnistajat is a Finnish orienteering club in Helsinki, Finland. It was founded in 1943.

== History ==
The club won the 10-mila relay in 1954 and in 1970. Its team won the HD18 relay in the 10-mila of the youth in August 2013. In April 2016, it was the foreign club with most runners registered for O-Ringen.
