= Michal Smola =

Czech orienteer (born 1981)

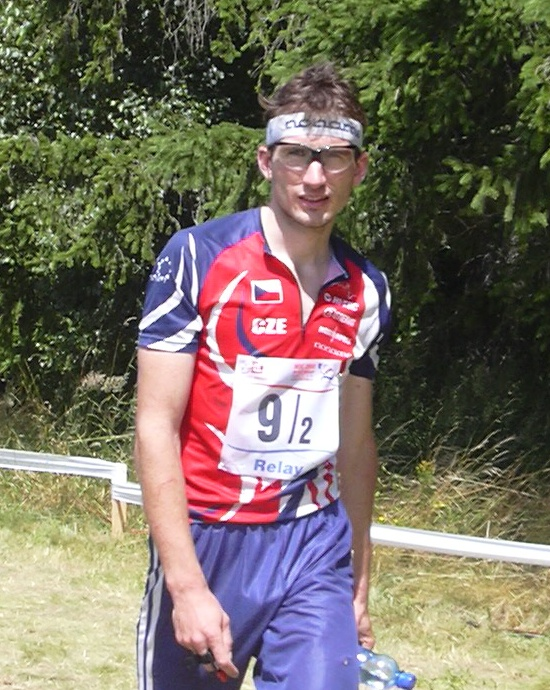
- Smola at WOC 2008

Personal information
- Nationality: Czech
- Born: 21 December 1981 (age 44) Zlín

Sport
- Sport: Orienteering
Medal record
Men's orienteering
Representing Czech Republic
World Championships
Silver medal – second place	2008 Olomouc	Middle
Junior World Championships
Gold medal – first place	2000 Nové Město na Moravě	Short
Gold medal – first place	2000 Nové Město na Moravě	Relay
Gold medal – first place	2001 Miskolc	Relay
Bronze medal – third place	2001 Miskolc	Classic
Bronze medal – third place	2001 Miskolc	Short

Michal Smola (born 21 December 1981) is a Czech orienteering competitor, silver medalist from the world championships, and junior world champion. He became Junior World Champion in the short distance in Nové Město na Moravě in 2000, and with the Czech team in relay in 2000 and in 2001. His best achievement by September 2009 is silver medal in the middle distance at the 2008 World Orienteering Championship in Olomouc.

Smola was born in Zlín, a city of 80,000 people in the Czech Republic. At the age of 12, he joined the local orienteering club SKOB Zlín where he was trained by Jiri Stacke until 1999. In 1995, age 14, Michal gained his first orienteering title in the national championship (short distance, category under 16 years old). In 1998, he won his first international competition, European Youth Championships in Hungary in the under 18 years old category.

== Junior world championships ==
After 2000, Michal started training on his own. The same year he won two Junior world championships (short distance and relay). Together with the Czech team, he defended the relay gold next year and won individual bronze medals in short and long-distance runs.

== World championships ==
His first successes in adult competitions were two gold and one silver medal in University world championships in 2004. However, in 2005 he failed to qualify for the World Orienteering Championship (WOC) and also got a serious ankle injury. Those failures pushed Michal to reconsider his training and to change the club to Swedish Södertalje-Nykvarn Orientering. The changes worked well and Michal progressed to the 4th place at 2006 WOC long-distance competition. In 2008 he won his first, and the only so far WOC medal - a silver in the middle-distance run. In 8 years through August 2009 he has participated in 96 IOF world ranking races. After WOC 2009, Michal ranked 29th in the world in foot orienteering. His highest rank ever was 8th, in 2008.

=== Martin Johansson 2009 WOC injury ===
At WOC 2009 in Miskolc, Hungary, during the last leg of the relay race Thierry Gueorgiou (France), Anders Nordberg (Norway), and Smola were close behind the lead runner, Martin Johansson (Sweden), when Johansson suffered a 12 cm deep penetrating trauma from a stick in his right thigh. While Nordberg ran for help, Gueorgiou and Smola stayed with Johansson; they pulled out the stick, harnessed the wound using a shirt and a GPS tracking strap and then carried Johansson to a road. Nordberg brought a physician there.

== Personal life ==
Michal is a doctoral student at Tomas Bata University in Zlín at the Faculty of Applied Informatics, Department of Electrotechnics and Measurements. His hobbies include travel, cross-country skiing, cycling, climbing, photography, music and watching movies.

== See also ==
- Czech orienteers
- List of orienteers
- List of orienteering events
