= 2005 World Orienteering Championships =

2005 edition of the World Orienteering Championships

- Host city: Aichi
- Country: Japan
- Events: 8

The 2005 World Orienteering Championships, the 22nd World Orienteering Championships, were held in Aichi, Japan, 9 –15 August 2005.

The championships had eight events; sprint for men and women, middle distance for men and women, long distance (formerly called individual or classic distance) for men and women, and relays for men and women.

== Medalists ==
Event	Gold		Silver		Bronze	
Men's sprint	Emil Wingstedt (SWE)	14:31.0	Daniel Hubmann (SUI)		Jani Lakanen (FIN)	
Women's sprint	Simone Niggli (SUI)	14:02.7	Anne Margrethe Hausken (NOR)		Heather Monro (GBR)	
Men's middle distance	Thierry Gueorgiou (FRA)	33:00.3	Chris Terkelsen (DEN)		Jarkko Huovila (FIN)	
Women's middle distance	Simone Niggli (SUI)	32:46.3	Jenny Johansson (SWE)		Minna Kauppi (FIN)	
Men's long distance	Andrey Khramov (RUS)	1:37:22	Marc Lauenstein (SUI)		Holger Hott Johansen (NOR)	
Women's long distance	Simone Niggli (SUI)	1:13:23	Heli Jukkola (FIN)		Vroni König-Salmi (SUI)	
Men's relay	Norway (NOR): Holger Hott Johansen; Øystein Kristiansen; Jørgen Rostrup	2:16:48	France (FRA): Francois Gonon; Damien Renard; Thierry Gueorgiou	2:17:16	Switzerland (SUI): Matthias Merz; Marc Lauenstein; Daniel Hubmann	2:17:48
Women's relay	Switzerland (SUI): Lea Müller; Vroni König-Salmi; Simone Niggli	2:07:46	Norway (NOR): Marianne Andersen; Marianne Riddervold; Anne Margrethe Hausken		Sweden (SWE): Jenny Johansson; Karolina Arewång-Höjsgaard; Emma Engstrand	
