= Linda Antonsen =

Norwegian orienteering competitor

Personal information
- Nationality: Norwegian
- Born: 5 July 1980 (age 45)

Sport
- Sport: Orienteering
Medal record
Women's orienteering
Representing Norway
World Championships
Bronze medal – third place	2001 Tampere	Relay

Linda Antonsen (born 5 July 1980) is a Norwegian orienteering competitor. She competed at the 2001 World Orienteering Championships in Tampere, where she placed 11th in the sprint, and won a bronze medal in the relay event together with Birgitte Husebye, Elisabeth Ingvaldsen and Hanne Staff.
