= Lea Müller =

Swiss orienteering competitor

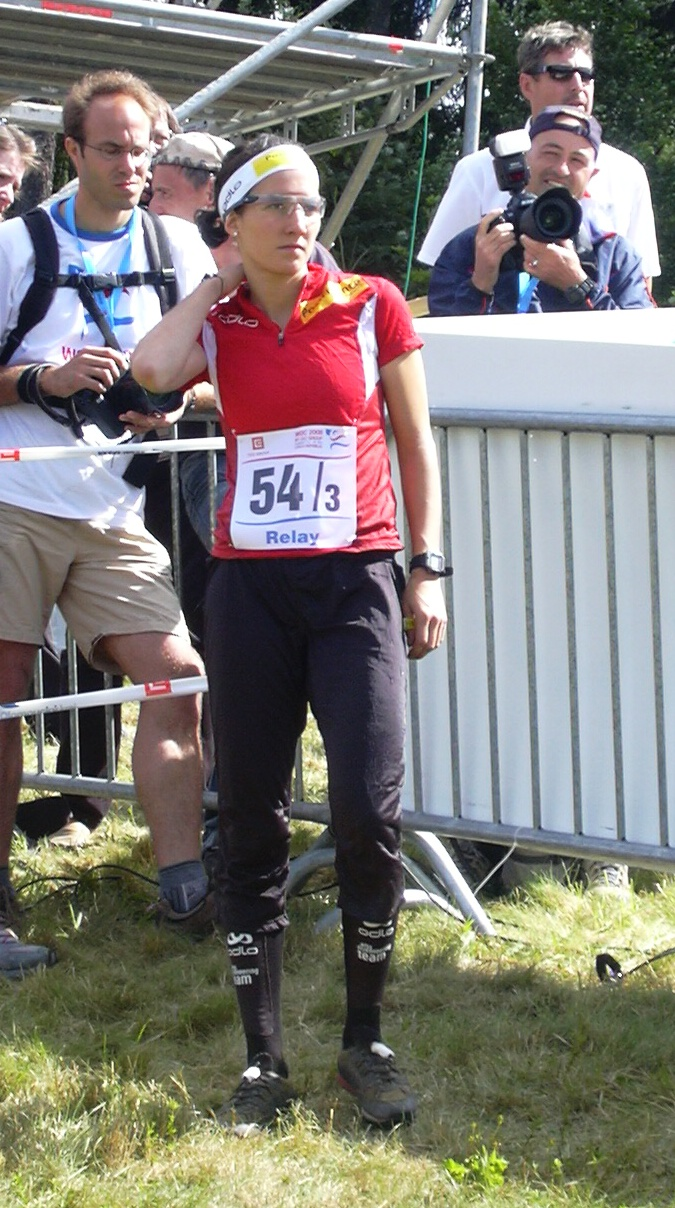
- Müller in 2008

Personal information
- Born: 7 May 1982 (age 44)

Sport
- Sport: Orienteering
Medal record
Women's orienteering
Representing Switzerland
World Championships
Gold medal – first place	2005 Aichi	Relay
European Championships
Silver medal – second place	2006 Otepää	Relay
Junior World Championships
Gold medal – first place	2002 Alicante	Relay

Lea Müller (born 7 May 1982) is a Swiss orienteering competitor and World Champion. She participated on the Swiss winning team (Relay) in the World Orienteering Championships in Aichi 2005. She also won the World Games (Relay) in 2005 with the Swiss team.
