= Lucie Böhm =

Austrian orienteering competitor (born 1974)

Medal record

Women's orienteering

Representing Austria

World Championships
Gold medal – first place	1997 Grimstad	Short distance
Silver medal – second place	1999 Inverness	Short distance

Lucie Rothauer (née Böhm, born 12 October 1974) is an Austrian orienteering competitor. She won the 1997 Short distance World Orienteering Championships, and obtained silver medal in 1999.

== See also ==
- List of orienteers
- List of orienteering events
