= Josef von Smola (1764–1820) =

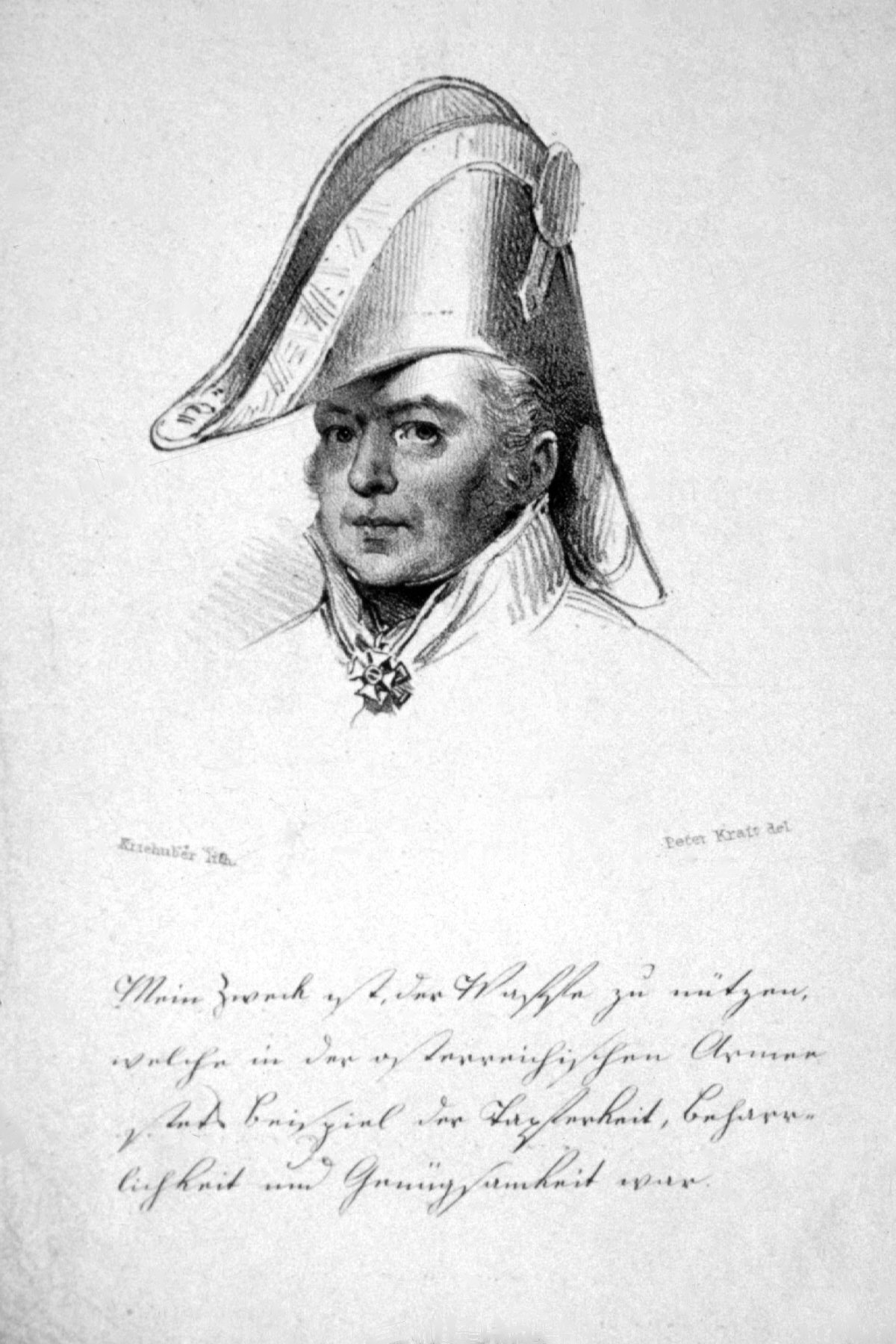
Josef von Smola, lithograph by Josefa Kriehubena, original painting Johann Peter Krafft

Josef Freiherr von Smola (12 June 1764 in Teplice – 29 November 1820 in Vienna) was a (commissioned) officer and holder of the Knight's and Commander's Crosses of the Order of Maria Theresa.

== Life ==
He joined the army as an artillery gunner in 1780. He was awarded the rank of lieutenant in 1786. In the war against the Turks, he significantly participated in the siege of the towns of Sabac and Belgrade. He became famous for fundamental improvement in artillery organization in Flanders in 1790. In 1792 he took part in the crusade against France, among others, in the battle of Jemappes. In 1793 he took charge of Archduke Charles horse battery command. Subsequently, he won at the battle of Neerwiden and he was awarded the Knight's Cross of the Order of Maria Theresa for this victory.

He was badly wounded at the battle of Fleurus in 1794. He was promoted to first lieutenant in 1796 for key help during the defence of Ehrenbreitstein Fortress. He was badly wounded at Meßkirch for the second time in 1800. Then he continued as Major in the Czech Legion. In 1805 he battled in Italy. In 1809 he led the 3rd Army Corps already as colonel in Regensburg. He was awarded the second Cross of the Order of Maria Theresa, this time the Commander's one, and promoted to major general.

He was not, however, only a commander, but also an engineer and an author of many innovations in the artillery. One of the famous ones was, for example, wall gun-mounting in 1807.

He was married to Mary Smola, Baroness of Häring (1771–1807). His two sons Josef von Smola Jr. and Karl von Smola were also officers. The last living descendants being Miloslav von Smola (* 29 August 1949 in Prague) and Miloslav von Smola (* 6 January 1986 in Prague), both currently living in the Czech Republic.
