= Kirsi Boström =

Finnish orienteering competitor

Medal record

Women's orienteering

Representing Finland

World Championships
Gold medal – first place	1995 Detmold	Relay
Gold medal – first place	1999 Inverness	Classic distance
Silver medal – second place	1993 West Point	Relay
Silver medal – second place	1999 Inverness	Relay

Kirsi Boström (née Tiira; born 20 May 1968, in Parikkala) is a Finnish orienteering competitor and World champion. She won the 1999 Classic distance World Orienteering Championships. She won a gold medal at the 1995 World Orienteering Championships in Detmold with the Finnish relay team. She received silver medals with the relay team in 1993 (West Point) and in 1999 (Inverness).

== See also ==
- Finnish orienteers
- List of orienteers
- List of orienteering events
