= Josef von Smola (1805–1856) =

Josef Freiherr von Smola
- Born: November 16, 1805; Vienna, Austrian Empire
- Died: June 29, 1856 (aged 50); Lyon, France
- Alma mater: Theresian Military Academy; Vienna Polytechnic Institute
- Relatives: Josef von Smola (father)
- Military career
- Allegiance: Austrian Empire
- Branch: Austrian Army
- Service years: 1820–1856
- Rank: Major General
- Commands: 8th Field Artillery Regiment

Josef Freiherr von Smola (16 November 1805 – 29 June 1856) was an Austrian officer.

== Life ==
Josef von Smola was born 6 November 1805 in Vienna. His father was Josef von Smola (1764–1820), officer and holder of the Knight's Cross of the Order of Maria Theresia. He graduated from Theresianischen Ritterakademie in Vienna and in 1820 he joined the artillery, just as his father. He continued to study, namely at the Vienna Polytechnic Institute. In 1831, he rose to the rank of battery commander, in 1840 to the rank of captain and company commander, and in 1848 to the rank of major. In 1849 he rose to the rank of colonel, and he joined the general directorate of the artillery as district commander in Vienna. From 1851, he worked as the artillery director in Prague, 1852 in Vienna and subsequently in Galicia. After that, he was promoted to major general and obtained the 8th field artillery regiment. In 1855, he became president of the committee of Artillery. He died 29 June 1856 in Lyon on his study trip.
