= Damien Renard =

French orienteering competitor

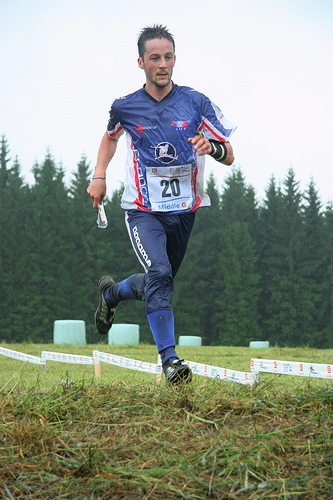
- Renard at WOC 2008

Medal record

Men's orienteering

Representing France

World Championships
| Silver medal – second place | 2005 Aichi | Relay |

European Championships
| Silver medal – second place | 2006 Otepää | Relay |

Damien Renard (born 20 February 1980) is a French orienteering competitor. He has received silver medals with the French relay team in both world championships and European championships. He won Swedish middle-distance championship in 2005.

He competed at the 2005 World Orienteering Championships in Aichi, where he finished 12th in the middle distance, and received a silver medal in relay with the French team.

He received a silver medal in the relay event at the 2006 European Orienteering Championships in Otepää, and finished 4th in the middle distance.

He finished 15th overall in the Orienteering World Cup in 2004, 15th in 2005, 13th in 2006, and 7th in 2007.

== Club competitions ==
In the 2008 season Renard is a member of the Norwegian club Kristansand OK, and won the Tiomila relay in 2008 and Jukola relay in 2009 with this club.
