= Jarkko Huovila =

Finnish orienteering competitor

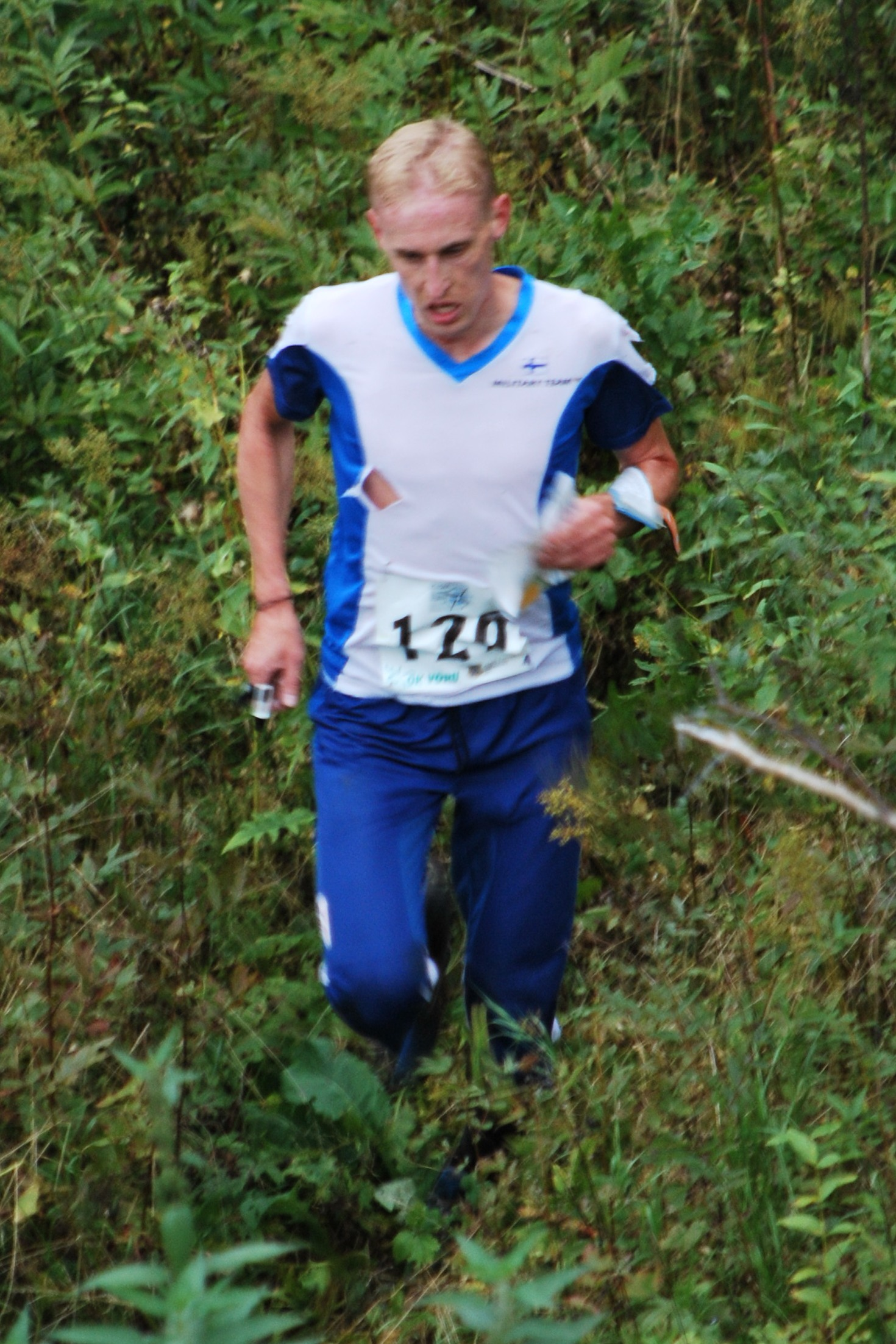
- Huovila in 2009

Medal record

Men's orienteering

Representing Finland

World Championships
Gold medal – first place	2001 Tampere	Relay
Silver medal – second place	2003 Rapperswil/Jona	Relay
Silver medal – second place	2006 Aarhus	Middle
Silver medal – second place	2006 Aarhus	Relay
Bronze medal – third place	2005 Aichi	Middle

Junior World Championships
Silver medal – second place	1994 Gdynia	Relay
Bronze medal – third place	1995 Horsens	Relay

Jarkko Huovila (born 15 November 1975) is a Finnish orienteering competitor and World Champion. He participated on the Finnish winning team in the 2001 World Orienteering Championships. He also has silver medals from the 2003 and 2006 Team Events, and individual medals from the Short Distance (silver in 2006, and a bronze in 2005). He won the Jukola relay in 2000, 2003 and 2012.

== See also ==
- Finnish orienteers
- List of orienteers
- List of orienteering events
