= 1999 World Orienteering Championships =

1999 edition of the World Orienteering Championships

- Host city: Inverness
- Country: Scotland
- Events: 6

The 1999 World Orienteering Championships, the 18th World Orienteering Championships, were held in Inverness, Scotland, 1–8 August 1999.

The championships had six events; the classic distance (formerly called individual) for men and women, the short distance for men and women, and relays for men and women.

== Medalists ==
Event	Gold		Silver	Bronze
Men's classic distance	Bjørnar Valstad (NOR)	1.37.25	Carl Henrik Bjørseth (NOR)	Alain Berger (SUI)
Women's classic distance	Kirsi Boström (FIN)	1.17.56	Hanne Staff (NOR)	Johanna Asklöf (FIN)
Men's short distance	Jørgen Rostrup (NOR)	25.48	Juha Peltola (FIN)	Janne Salmi (FIN)
Women's short distance	Yvette Baker (GBR)	25.55	Lucie Böhm (AUT)	Frauke Schmitt Gran (GER)
Men's relay	Norway (NOR): Tore Sandvik; Bernt Bjørnsgaard; Petter Thoresen; Bjørnar Valstad	3.21.50	Finland (FIN): Jani Lakanen; Mikael Boström; Juha Peltola; Janne Salmi	Sweden (SWE): Jimmy Birklin; Håkan Eriksson; Jörgen Olsson; Johan Ivarsson
Women's relay	Norway (NOR): Birgitte Husebye; Elisabeth Ingvaldsen; Hanne Sandstad; Hanne Staff	2.55.56	Finland (FIN): Sanna Nymalm; Reeta-Mari Kolkkala; Kirsi Boström; Johanna Asklöf	Sweden (SWE): Katarina Allberg; Marlena Jansson; Anette Granstedt; Gunilla Svärd

== Results ==
=== Women's classic distance ===
WOC 1999 – Classic – Women
Rank	Competitor	Nation	Time
1st place, gold medalist(s)	Kirsi Boström	Finland	1:17:56
2nd place, silver medalist(s)	Hanne Staff	Norway	1:18:30
3rd place, bronze medalist(s)	Johanna Asklöf	Finland	1:18:33
4	Yvette Baker	Great Britain	1:19:10
5	Hanne Sandstad	Norway	1:19:37
6	Reeta-Mari Kolkkala	Finland	1:19:46
7	Kylli Kaljus	Estonia	1:19:58

=== Women's short distance ===
WOC 1999 – Short – Women
Rank	Competitor	Nation	Time
1st place, gold medalist(s)	Yvette Baker	Great Britain	25:55
2nd place, silver medalist(s)	Lucie Böhm	Austria	26:57
3rd place, bronze medalist(s)	Frauke Schmitt Gran	Germany	27:48
4	Sanna Nymalm	Finland	27:50
5	Marlena Jansson	Sweden	27:50
6	Hanne Sandstad	Norway	27:55
7	Vroni König-Salmi	Switzerland	28:24

=== Men's classic distance ===
WOC 1999 – Classic – Men
Rank	Competitor	Nation	Time
1st place, gold medalist(s)	Bjørnar Valstad	Norway	1:37:25
2nd place, silver medalist(s)	Carl Henrik Bjørseth	Norway	1:40:20
3rd place, bronze medalist(s)	Alain Berger	Switzerland	1:40:26
4	Jimmy Birklin	Sweden	1:42:30
5	Johan Ivarsson	Sweden	1:42:51
6	Petter Thoresen	Norway	1:42:58
7	Bernt Bjørnsgaard	Norway	1:43:15

=== Men's short distance ===
WOC 1999 – Short – Men
Rank	Competitor	Nation	Time
1st place, gold medalist(s)	Jørgen Rostrup	Norway	25:48
2nd place, silver medalist(s)	Juha Peltola	Finland	26:11
3rd place, bronze medalist(s)	Janne Salmi	Finland	26:14
4	Jani Lakanen	Finland	26:15
5	Håkan Eriksson	Sweden	26:24
6	Johan Ivarsson	Sweden	26:44
7	Petter Thoresen	Norway	26:59
