= List of World Orienteering Championships medalists (men) =

This is a list of medalists from the World Orienteering Championships in men's orienteering.

== Individual/Classic/Long Distance ==
This event was called "Individual" from 1966 to 1989 and "Classic distance" from 1991 to 2001. Since 2003 it is called "Long distance".

Year	Gold	Silver	Bronze	Length and controls
1966	(Norway) Åge Hadler	(Finland) Aimo Tepsell	(Sweden) Anders Morelius	14.1 km, 11 controls
1968	(Sweden) Kalle Johansson	(Sweden) Sture Björk	(Norway) Åge Hadler	14.7 km, 18 controls
1970	(Norway) Stig Berge	(Switzerland) Karl John	(Switzerland) Dieter Hulliger	14.5 km, 19 controls
1972	(Norway) Åge Hadler	(Norway) Stig Berge	(Sweden) Bernt Frilén	13.5 km, 18 controls
1974	(Sweden) Bernt Frilén	(Norway) Jan Fjærestad	(Norway) Eystein Weltzien	15.9 km, 26 controls
1976	(Norway) Egil Johansen	(Sweden) Rolf Pettersson	(Norway) Svein Jacobsen	15.5 km, 24 controls
1978	(Norway) Egil Johansen	(Finland) Risto Nuuros	(Finland) Simo Nurminen	15.7 km, 21 controls
1979	(Norway) Øyvin Thon	(Norway) Egil Johansen	(Norway) Tore Sagvolden	15.1 km, 16 controls
1981	(Norway) Øyvin Thon	(Norway) Tore Sagvolden	(Norway) Morten Berglia	14.1 km, 18 controls
1983	(Norway) Morten Berglia	(Norway) Øyvin Thon	(Norway) Sigurd Dæhli	14.0 km, 24 controls
1985	(Finland) Kari Sallinen	(Norway) Tore Sagvolden	(Norway) Egil Iversen	15.2 km, 23 controls
1987	(Sweden) Kent Olsson	(Norway) Tore Sagvolden	(Switzerland) Urs Flühmann	14.6 km, 21 controls
1989	(Norway) Petter Thoresen	(Sweden) Kent Olsson	(Norway) Håvard Tveite	17.7 km, 24 controls
1991	(Sweden) Jörgen Mårtensson	(Sweden) Kent Olsson	(Soviet Union) Sixten Sild	17.4 km, 25 controls
1993	(Denmark) Allan Mogensen	(Sweden) Jörgen Mårtensson	(Norway) Petter Thoresen	13.5 km, 19 controls
1995	(Sweden) Jörgen Mårtensson	(Finland) Janne Salmi	(Denmark) Carsten Jørgensen	16.2 km, 30 controls
1997	(Norway) Petter Thoresen	(Sweden) Jörgen Mårtensson	(Norway) Kjetil Bjørlo	13.7 km, 24 controls
1999	(Norway) Bjørnar Valstad	(Norway) Carl Henrik Bjørseth	(Switzerland) Alain Berger	15.7 km, 25 controls
2001	(Norway) Jørgen Rostrup	(Finland) Jani Lakanen	(Norway) Carl Henrik Bjørseth	14.4 km, 26 controls
2003	(Switzerland) Thomas Bührer	(Ukraine) Yuri Omeltchenko	(Sweden) Emil Wingstedt	16.7 km, 34 controls
2004	(Norway) Bjørnar Valstad	(Sweden) Mattias Karlsson	(Norway) Holger Hott Johansen	17.1 km, 28 controls
2005	(Russia) Andrey Khramov	(Switzerland) Marc Lauenstein	(Norway) Holger Hott Johansen	12.9 km, 29 controls
2006	(Finland) Jani Lakanen	(Switzerland) Marc Lauenstein	(Russia) Andrey Khramov	17.5 km, 32 controls
2007	(Switzerland) Matthias Merz	(Russia) Andrey Khramov	(Norway) Anders Nordberg	18.17 km, 28 controls
2008	(Switzerland) Daniel Hubmann	(Norway) Anders Nordberg	(France) François Gonon	17.3 km, 36 controls
2009	(Switzerland) Daniel Hubmann	(France) Thierry Gueorgiou	(Italy) Mikhail Mamleev	17.55 km, 33 controls
2010	(Norway) Olav Lundanes	(Norway) Anders Nordberg	(France) Thierry Gueorgiou	15.11 km, 28 controls
2011	(France) Thierry Gueorgiou	(Finland) Pasi Ikonen	(France) François Gonon	15.8 km, 31 controls
2012	(Norway) Olav Lundanes	(Switzerland) Matthias Merz	(Latvia) Edgars Bertuks	18.3 km, 31 controls
2013	(France) Thierry Gueorgiou	(Finland) Jani Lakanen	(Latvia) Edgars Bertuks	19.8 km, 33 controls
2014	(France) Thierry Gueorgiou	(Switzerland) Daniel Hubmann	(Norway) Olav Lundanes	16.36 km, 33 controls
2015	(France) Thierry Gueorgiou	(Switzerland) Daniel Hubmann	(Norway) Olav Lundanes	15.5 km, 32 controls
2016	(Norway) Olav Lundanes	(France) Thierry Gueorgiou	(Switzerland) Daniel Hubmann	15.5 km, 30 controls
2017	(Norway) Olav Lundanes	(Russia) Leonid Novikov	(Sweden) William Lind	17.1 km, 25 controls
2018	(Norway) Olav Lundanes	(Ukraine) Ruslan Glebov	(Switzerland) Fabian Hertner	16.1 km, 24 controls
2019	(Norway) Olav Lundanes	(Norway) Kasper Fosser	(Switzerland) Daniel Hubmann	16.6 km, 26 controls
2021	(Norway) Kasper Harlem Fosser	(Switzerland) Matthias Kyburz	(Norway) Magne Dæhli	13.6 km, 29 controls
2023	(Norway) Kasper Harlem Fosser	(Switzerland) Matthias Kyburz	(Finland) Olli Ojanaho	14.0 km, 35 controls
2025	(Norway) Kasper Harlem Fosser	(Sweden) Martin Regborn	(Switzerland) Matthias Kyburz	16.0 km, 27 controls

== Short/Middle Distance ==
This event was first held in 1991. The format was changed and renamed "Middle Distance" in 2003 with the introduction of the Sprint discipline.

Year	Gold	Silver	Bronze	Length and controls
Short Distance
1991	(Czech Republic) Petr Kozák	(Sweden) Kent Olsson	(Sweden) Martin Johansson	5.8 km, 10 controls
1993	(Norway) Petter Thoresen	(Finland) Timo Karppinen	(Sweden) Martin Johansson	4.7 km, 14 controls
1995	(Ukraine) Yuri Omeltchenko	(Sweden) Jörgen Mårtensson	(Norway) Bjørnar Valstad	5.6 km, 18 controls
1997	(Finland) Janne Salmi	(Finland) Timo Karppinen	(Norway) Bjørnar Valstad	4.2 km, 16 controls
1999	(Norway) Jørgen Rostrup	(Finland) Juha Peltola	(Finland) Janne Salmi	4.5 km, 17 controls
2001	(Finland) Pasi Ikonen	(Norway) Tore Sandvik	(Norway) Jørgen Rostrup	4.1 km, 15 controls
Middle Distance
2003	(France) Thierry Gueorgiou	(Norway) Bjørnar Valstad	(Norway) Øystein Kristiansen	5.0 km, 21 controls
2004	(France) Thierry Gueorgiou	(Russia) Valentin Novikov	(Norway) Anders Nordberg	6.3 km, 18 controls
2005	(France) Thierry Gueorgiou	(Denmark) Chris Terkelsen	(Finland) Jarkko Huovila	5.0 km, 13 controls
2006	(Norway) Holger Hott Johansen	(Finland) Jarkko Huovila	(United Kingdom) Jamie Stevenson	6.3 km, 23 controls
2007	(France) Thierry Gueorgiou	(Finland) Tero Föhr	(Russia) Valentin Novikov	6.15 km, 17 controls
2008	(France) Thierry Gueorgiou	(Czech Republic) Michal Smola	(Russia) Valentin Novikov	5.8 km, 27 controls
2009	(France) Thierry Gueorgiou	(Switzerland) Daniel Hubmann	(Switzerland) Matthias Merz	6.57 km, 25 controls
2010	(Norway) Carl Waaler Kaas	(Sweden) Peter Öberg	(France) Thierry Gueorgiou (Switzerland) Daniel Hubmann	5.47 km, 19 controls
2011	(France) Thierry Gueorgiou	(Sweden) Peter Öberg	(Norway) Olav Lundanes	5.4 km, 21 controls
2012	(Latvia) Edgars Bertuks	(Russia) Valentin Novikov	(Switzerland) Fabian Hertner	6.5 km, 20 controls
2013	(Russia) Leonid Novikov	(France) Thierry Gueorgiou	(Sweden) Gustav Bergman	6.3 km, 19 controls
2014	(Norway) Olav Lundanes	(Switzerland) Fabian Hertner	(Ukraine) Oleksandr Kratov	5.9 km, 19 controls
2015	(Switzerland) Daniel Hubmann	(France) Lucas Basset	(Sweden) Olle Boström	6.2 km, 25 controls
2016	(Switzerland) Matthias Kyburz	(Norway) Olav Lundanes	(Switzerland) Daniel Hubmann	6.3 km, 25 controls
2017	(France) Thierry Gueorgiou	(Switzerland) Fabian Hertner	(Ukraine) Oleksandr Kratov	6.0 km, 24 controls
2018	(Norway) Eskil Kinneberg	(Switzerland) Daniel Hubmann	(Switzerland) Florian Howald	5.9 km, 19 controls
2019	(Norway) Olav Lundanes	(Sweden) Gustav Bergman	(Norway) Magne Dæhli	6.1 km, 21 controls
2021	(Switzerland) Matthias Kyburz	(Sweden) Gustav Bergman	(Ukraine) Ruslan Glibov	5.4 km, 24 controls
2023	(Switzerland) Matthias Kyburz	(Switzerland) Joey Hadorn	(Austria) Jannis Bonek	5.9 km, 22 controls
2025	(Norway) Eirik Langedal Breivik	(Norway) Kasper Harlem Fosser	(Sweden) Anton Johansson	5.8 km, 18 controls

== Sprint ==
This event was first held in 2001.

Year	Gold	Silver	Bronze	Length and controls
2001	(Sweden) Jimmy Birklin	(Finland) Pasi Ikonen	(Sweden) Jörgen Olsson	2.66 km, 12 controls
2003	(United Kingdom) Jamie Stevenson	(Czech Republic) Rudolf Ropek	(France) Thierry Gueorgiou	2.8 km, 18 controls
2004	(Sweden) Niclas Jonasson	(Sweden) Håkan Eriksson	(Ukraine) Yuri Omeltchenko	3.1 km, 12 controls
2005	(Sweden) Emil Wingstedt	(Switzerland) Daniel Hubmann	(Finland) Jani Lakanen	2.4 km, 14 controls
2006	(Sweden) Emil Wingstedt	(Switzerland) Daniel Hubmann	(Denmark) Claus Bloch	3.1 km, 21 controls
2007	(France) Thierry Gueorgiou	(Switzerland) Matthias Merz	(Sweden) Martin Johansson	3.2 km, 15 controls
2008	(Russia) Andrey Khramov	(Switzerland) Daniel Hubmann	(Sweden) Martin Johansson	3.0 km, 17 controls
2009	(Russia) Andrey Khramov	(Switzerland) Fabian Hertner	(Switzerland) Daniel Hubmann	3.2 km, 22 controls
2010	(Switzerland) Matthias Müller	(Switzerland) Fabian Hertner	(France) Frédéric Tranchand	2.7 km, 21 controls
2011	(Switzerland) Daniel Hubmann	(Sweden) Anders Holmberg	(Switzerland) Matthias Müller	2.5 km, 20 controls
2012	(Switzerland) Matthias Kyburz	(Switzerland) Matthias Merz	(Switzerland) Matthias Müller	4.0 km, 20 controls
2013	(Finland) Mårten Boström	(United Kingdom) Scott Fraser	(Sweden) Jonas Leandersson	3.9 km, 24 controls
2014	(Denmark) Søren Bobach	(Switzerland) Daniel Hubmann	(Denmark) Tue Lassen	4.4 km, 20 controls
2015	(Sweden) Jonas Leandersson	(Switzerland) Martin Hubmann	(Sweden) Jerker Lysell	4.1 km, 23 controls
2016	(Sweden) Jerker Lysell	(Switzerland) Matthias Kyburz	(Switzerland) Daniel Hubmann	4.1 km, 22 controls
2017	(Switzerland) Daniel Hubmann	(France) Frédéric Tranchand	(Sweden) Jerker Lysell	4.0 km, 15 controls
2018	(Switzerland) Daniel Hubmann	(New Zealand) Tim Robertson	(Switzerland) Andreas Kyburz	4.3 km, 18 controls
2021	(Sweden) Isac von Krusenstierna	(Norway) Kasper Harlem Fosser	(New Zealand) Tim Robertson	3.9 km, 24 controls
2022	(Norway) Kasper Harlem Fosser	(Sweden) Gustav Bergman	(Belgium) Yannick Michiels	4.3 km, 22 controls
2024	(Sweden) Martin Regborn	(Switzerland) Tino Polsini	(Sweden) Emil Svensk	4.4 km, 22 controls
2026	(Norway) Kasper Harlem Fosser	(France) Guilhem Verove	(Finland) Tuomas Heikkila	3.7km, 23 controls

== Knock-out Sprint ==
This event was first held in 2022.

Year	Gold	Silver	Bronze	Length and controls
2022	(Switzerland) Matthias Kyburz	(Sweden) August Mollén	(Sweden) Jonatan Gustafsson	2.4 km, 11 controls
2024	(Switzerland) Riccardo Rancan	(Norway) Jørgen Baklid	(Sweden) Jonatan Gustafsson	
2026	(France) Guilhem Verove	(Finland) Akseli Ruohola	(Sweden) Isac von Krusenstierna	1.9km, 11 controls

== Relay ==
Year	Gold	Silver	Bronze
1966	Sweden Bertil Norman; Karl Johansson; Anders Morelius; Göran Öhlund	Finland Erkki Kohvakka; Rolf Koskinen; Juhani Salmenkylä; Aimo Tepsell	Norway Dagfinn Olsen; Ola Skarholt; Åge Hadler; Stig Berge
1968	Sweden Sture Björk; Karl Johansson; Sten-Olof Carlström; Göran Öhlund	Finland Rolf Koskinen; Veijo Tahvanainen; Juhani Salmenkylä; Markku Salminen	Norway Per Fosser; Ola Skarholt; Stig Berge; Åge Hadler
1970	Norway Ola Skarholt; Stig Berge; Per Fosser; Åge Hadler	Sweden Björn Nordin; Karl Johansson; Sture Björk; Bernt Frilén	Czechoslovakia Zdeněk Lenhart; Bohuslav Beránek; Jaroslav Jašek; Svatoslav Galík
1972	Sweden Lennart Carlström; Rolf Pettersson; Arne Johansson; Bernt Frilén	Switzerland Dieter Hulliger; Dieter Wolf; Bernard Marti; Karl John	Hungary Zoltán Boros; János Sőtér; Géza Vajda; András Hegedűs
1974	Sweden Rolf Pettersson; Gunnar Öhlund; Arne Johansson; Bernt Frilén	Finland Hannu Mäkirinta; Markku Salminen; Risto Nuuros; Seppo Väli-Klemelä	Norway Svein Jacobsen; Jan Fjærestad; Ivar Formo; Eystein Weltzien
1976	Sweden Erik Johansson; Gert Pettersson; Arne Johansson; Rolf Pettersson	Norway Jan Fjærestad; Øystein Halvorsen; Svein Jacobsen; Egil Johansen	Finland Hannu Mäkirinta; Markku Salminen; Matti Mäkinen; Kimmo Rauhamäki
1978	Norway Jan Fjærestad; Svein Jacobsen; Egil Johansen; Eystein Weltzien	Sweden Rolf Pettersson; Lars Lönnkvist; Kjell Lauri; Olle Nabo	Finland Urho Kujala; Jorma Karvonen; Simo Nurminen; Risto Nuuros
1979	Sweden Rolf Pettersson; Kjell Lauri; Lars Lönnkvist; Björn Rosendahl	Finland Seppo Keskinarkaus; Hannu Kottonen; Risto Nuuros; Ari Anjala	Czechoslovakia Petr Uher; Zdeněk Lenhart; Jiří Ticháček; Jaroslav Kačmarčík
1981	Norway Øyvin Thon; Harald Thon; Tore Sagvolden; Sigurd Dæhli	Sweden Lars-Henrik Undeland; Bengt Levin; Jörgen Mårtensson; Lars Lönnkvist	Finland Kari Sallinen; Ari Anjala; Seppo Rytkönen; Hannu Kottonen
1983	Norway Morten Berglia; Øyvin Thon; Tore Sagvolden; Harald Thon	Czechoslovakia Vlastimil Uchytil; Pavel Ditrych; Josef Pollák; Jaroslav Kačmarčík	Sweden Bengt Levin; Kjell Lauri; Lars Lönnkvist; Kent Olsson
1985	Norway Morten Berglia; Atle Hansen; Tore Sagvolden; Øyvin Thon	Sweden Lars Palmqvist; Michael Wehlin; Kjell Lauri; Jörgen Mårtensson	Switzerland Willi Müller; Martin Howald; Urs Flühmann; Alain Gafner
1987	Norway Morten Berglia; Håvard Tveite; Tore Sagvolden; Øyvin Thon	Switzerland Markus Stappung; Stefan Bolliger; Kaspar Oettli; Urs Flühmann	Sweden Kent Olsson; Hans Melin; Jörgen Mårtensson; Lars Lönnkvist
1989	Norway Øyvin Thon; Rolf Vestre; Petter Thoresen; Håvard Tveite	Sweden Kent Olsson; Michael Wehlin; Jörgen Mårtensson; Håkan Eriksson	Finland Keijo Parkkinen; Ari Kattainen; Peter Ivars; Reijo Mattinen
1991	Switzerland Thomas Bührer; Alain Berger; Urs Flühmann; Christian Aebersold	Norway Petter Thoresen; Bjørnar Valstad; Rolf Vestre; Håvard Tveite	Finland Reijo Mattinen; Ari Anjala; Mika Kuisma; Keijo Parkkinen
1993	Switzerland Dominik Humbel; Christian Aebersold; Urs Flühmann; Thomas Bührer	United Kingdom Jonathan Musgrave; Martin Bagness; Stephen Palmer; Steven Hale	Finland Keijo Parkkinen; Mika Kuisma; Petri Forsman; Timo Karppinen
1995	Switzerland Alain Berger; Daniel Hotz; Christian Aebersold; Thomas Bührer	Finland Keijo Parkkinen; Reijo Mattinen; Timo Karppinen; Janne Salmi	Sweden Lars Holmqvist; Jimmy Birklin; Johan Ivarsson; Jörgen Mårtensson
1997	Denmark Torben Skovlyst; Carsten Jørgensen; Chris Terkelsen; Allan Mogensen	Finland Timo Karppinen; Juha Peltola; Mikael Boström; Janne Salmi	Norway Håvard Tveite; Bjørnar Valstad; Kjetil Bjørlo; Petter Thoresen
1999	Norway Tore Sandvik; Bernt Bjørnsgaard; Petter Thoresen; Bjørnar Valstad	Finland Jani Lakanen; Juha Peltola; Mikael Boström; Janne Salmi	Sweden Jimmy Birklin; Håkan Eriksson; Jörgen Olsson; Johan Ivarsson
2001	Finland Jani Lakanen; Jarkko Huovila; Juha Peltola; Janne Salmi	Norway Bernt Bjørnsgaard; Carl Henrik Bjørseth; Tore Sandvik; Bjørnar Valstad	Czech Republic Michal Horáček; Michal Jedlička; Radek Novotný; Rudolf Ropek
2003	Sweden Niclas Jonasson; Mattias Karlsson; Emil Wingstedt	Finland Jani Lakanen; Jarkko Huovila; Mats Haldin	United Kingdom Daniel Marston; Jon Duncan; Jamie Stevenson
2004	Norway Bjørnar Valstad; Øystein Kristiansen; Jørgen Rostrup	Russia Michael Mamleev; Andrey Khramov; Valentin Novikov	Sweden Mattias Karlsson; Emil Wingstedt; Niclas Jonasson
2005	Norway Holger Hott Johansen; Øystein Kristiansen; Jørgen Rostrup	France François Gonon; Damien Renard; Thierry Gueorgiou	Switzerland Matthias Merz; Marc Lauenstein; Daniel Hubmann
2006	Russia Roman Efimov; Andrey Khramov; Valentin Novikov	Finland Mats Haldin; Jarkko Huovila; Jani Lakanen	Sweden Niclas Jonasson; Emil Wingstedt; Mattias Karlsson
2007	Russia Roman Efimov; Andrey Khramov; Valentin Novikov	Sweden Peter Öberg; David Andersson; Emil Wingstedt	Finland Mats Haldin; Pasi Ikonen; Tero Föhr
2008	United Kingdom Graham Gristwood; Jon Duncan; Jamie Stevenson	Russia Dmitriy Tsvetkov; Andrey Khramov; Valentin Novikov	Switzerland Baptiste Rollier; Matthias Merz; Daniel Hubmann
2009^{[note]}	Switzerland Baptiste Rollier; Daniel Hubmann; Matthias Merz	Russia Dmitriy Tsvetkov; Valentin Novikov; Andrey Khramov	Finland Topi Anjala; Tero Föhr; Mats Haldin
2010	Russia Andrey Khramov; Dmitriy Tsvetkov; Valentin Novikov	Norway Carl Waaler Kaas; Audun Weltzien; Olav Lundanes	Switzerland Daniel Hubmann; Matthias Müller; Matthias Merz
2011	France Philippe Adamski; François Gonon; Thierry Gueorgiou	Norway Carl Waaler Kaas; Anders Nordberg; Olav Lundanes	Sweden Anders Holmberg; Olle Boström; David Andersson
2012	Czech Republic Tomáš Dlabaja; Jan Šedivý; Jan Procházka	Norway Magne Dæhli; Carl Waaler Kaas; Olav Lundanes	Sweden Jonas Leandersson; Peter Öberg; Anders Holmberg
2013	Russia Leonid Novikov; Valentin Novikov; Dmitry Tsvetkov	Sweden Anders Holmberg; Peter Öberg; Gustav Bergman	Ukraine Pavlo Ushkvarok; Oleksandr Kratov; Denys Shcherbakov
2014	Sweden Jonas Leandersson; Fredrik Johansson; Gustav Bergman	Switzerland Fabian Hertner; Daniel Hubmann; Matthias Kyburz	France Frédéric Tranchand; François Gonon; Thierry Gueorgiou
2015	Switzerland Fabian Hertner; Daniel Hubmann; Matthias Kyburz	Norway Øystein Kvaal Østerbø; Carl Waaler Kaas; Magne Dæhli	France Vincent Coupat; Lucas Basset; Frédéric Tranchand
2016	Norway Carl Godager Kaas; Olav Lundanes; Magne Dæhli	Switzerland Fabian Hertner; Daniel Hubmann; Matthias Kyburz	Sweden Fredrik Bakkman; Gustav Bergman; William Lind
2017	Norway Eskil Kinneberg; Olav Lundanes; Magne Dæhli	France Frédéric Tranchand; Lucas Basset; Thierry Gueorgiou	Sweden Johan Runesson; William Lind; Gustav Bergman
2018	Norway Gaute Hallan Steiwer; Eskil Kinneberg; Magne Dæhli	Switzerland Florian Howald; Daniel Hubmann; Matthias Kyburz	France Nicolas Rio; Lucas Basset; Frédéric Tranchand
2019	Sweden Johan Runesson; Emil Svensk; Gustav Bergman	Finland Aleksi Niemi; Elias Kuukka; Miika Kirmula	France Nicolas Rio; Frédéric Tranchand; Lucas Basset
2021	Sweden Albin Ridefelt; William Lind; Gustav Bergman	Norway Gaute Hallan Steiwer; Kasper Harlem Fosser; Eskil Kinneberg	Switzerland Martin Hubmann; Florian Howald; Matthias Kyburz
2023	Switzerland Daniel Hubmann; Joey Hadorn; Matthias Kyburz	Finland Topi Syrjäläinen; Olli Ojanaho; Miika Kirmula	Sweden Albin Ridefelt; Gustav Bergman; Emil Svensk
2025	Norway Jorgen Baklid; Eirik Langedal Breivik; Kasper Harlem Fosser	Switzerland Daniel Hubmann; Fabian Aebersold; Matthias Kyburz	Finland Topi Syrjäläinen; Akseli Ruohola; Miika Kirmula

2009 Note: In the 3rd leg Martin Johansson (Sweden) was in the lead when he suffered a serious injury; Thierry Gueorgiou (France), Anders Nordberg (Norway), and Michal Smola (Czech Republic) gave up their lead positions and rescued him. Interpretation of International Orienteering Federation (IOF) competition rules was at issue: rule 26.13 states "The organiser must void a competition if at any point it becomes clear that circumstances have arisen which make the competition unfair or dangerous for the competitors." After much deliberation on whether or not to void the relay, the organizers declared that it stood.

== Medal table ==
Men's orienteering. Table updated after the 2026 World Orienteering Championships. Does not include mixed events.

Rank	Nation	Gold	Silver	Bronze	Total
1	Norway	46	24	28	98
2	Sweden	23	24	29	76
3	Switzerland	21	30	21	72
4	France	15	8	10	33
5	Russia (1993–present)	8	7	3	18
6	Finland	6	24	15	45
7	Denmark	3	1	3	7
8	Great Britain	2	2	2	6
9	Ukraine	1	2	5	8
10	Czech Republic (1993–present)	1	2	1	4
11	Czechoslovakia (1966–91)	1	1	2	4
12	Latvia	1	0	2	3
13	New Zealand	0	1	1	2
14	Austria	0	0	1	1
14	Belgium	0	0	1	1
14	Hungary	0	0	1	1
14	Italy	0	0	1	1
14	Soviet Union (1966–91)	0	0	1	1
Totals (18 entries)		128	126	127	381

== Multiple medalists ==
Updated to May 2024. Including mixed events.

Rank	Athlete	Country	From	To	Gold	Silver	Bronze	Total
1	Thierry Gueorgiou	France	2003	2017	14	5	4	23
2	Olav Lundanes	Norway	2010	2019	10	4	3	17
3	Daniel Hubmann	Switzerland	2005	2019	9	11	9	28
4	Matthias Kyburz	Switzerland	2012	2023	8	6	1	8
5	Øyvin Thon	Norway	1979	1989	7	1	-	8
6	Andrey Khramov	Russia	2005	2015	6	4	3	13
7	Gustav Bergman	Sweden	2013	2023	5	4	5	8
8	Petter Thoresen	Norway	1989	1997	5	1	2	8
9	Valentin Novikov	Russia	2004	2013	4	5	2	11
10	Bjørnar Valstad	Norway	1991	2004	4	3	3	10

== Best performers by country ==
Updated to May 2024. Including mixed events.

Country	Athlete	From	To	Gold	Silver	Bronze	Total
France	Thierry Gueorgiou	2003	2017	14	5	4	23
Norway	Olav Lundanes	2010	2019	10	4	3	17
Switzerland	Daniel Hubmann	2005	2019	9	11	9	28
Russia	Andrey Khramov	2005	2015	6	4	3	10
Sweden	Gustav Bergman	2012	2023	5	4	5	14
Denmark	Søren Bobach	2014	2015	3	1	-	4
Finland	Jani Lakanen	1999	2006	2	5	1	8
United Kingdom	Jamie Stevenson	2003	2008	2	-	2	4
Ukraine	Yuri Omeltchenko	1995	2004	1	2	-	3
Latvia	Edgars Bertuks*	2012	2013	1	-	2	3
Czech Republic	Tomáš Dlabaja & Jan Procházka & Jan Šedivý (by the gold first ranking system)	2012; 2012; 2012	2012; 2012; 2012	1; 1; 1	- - -	- - -	1; 1; 1
Czech Republic	Rudolf Ropek (by total number of medals)	2001	2003	-	1	1	2
Czechoslovakia	Petr Kozak (by the gold first ranking system)	1991	1991	1	-	-	1
Czechoslovakia	Zdenek Lenhart & Jaroslav Kačmarčík (by total number of medals)	1970; 1979	1979; 1983	- -	- 1	2; 1	2; 2
New Zealand	Tim Robertson*	2018	2021	-	1	1	2
Austria	Jannis Bonek*	2023	2023	-	-	1	1
Belgium	Yannick Michiels*	2022	2022	-	-	1	1
Hungary	Zoltán Boros & János Sotér & Géza Vajda & András Hegedus	1972; 1972; 1972; 1972	1972; 1972; 1972; 1972	- - - -	- - - -	1; 1; 1; 1	1; 1; 1; 1
Italy	Mikhail Mamleev*	2009	2009	-	-	1	1
Soviet Union	Sixten Sild*	1991	1991	-	-	1	1

An asterisk (*) marks athletes who are the only representatives of their respective countries to win a medal.
