= Kainuu Orienteering Week =

Annual orienteering event in Finland

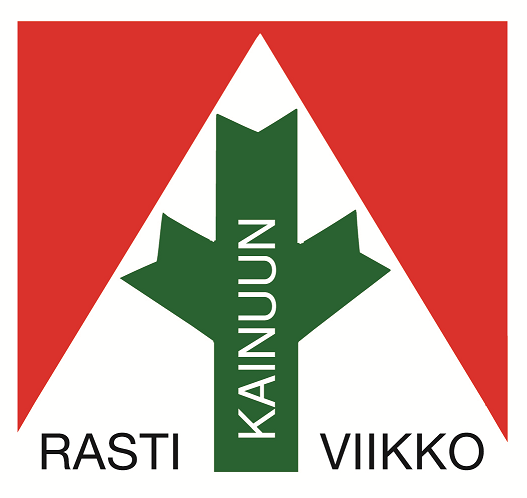
- Sport: Orienteering
- Founded: 1967
- Website: www.rastiviikko.fi

Kainuu Orienteering Week (KOW) is an annual Finnish, international, orienteering event held in the Kainuu region. Kainuu Orienteering Week is organized by Kainuun Rastiviikko Association. Measured by the number of participants, Kainuu Orienteering Week is one of the top-15 sports events in Finland and it is also one of the main events of The Finnish Orienteering Federation.

Kainuu Orienteering Week is the second oldest orienteering week in the world and the first event was arranged in 1966. Since then the event has been held every year, except 1974. The event attracted 315 orienteers in the first year and the participant record is from 2007 when there were 4,884 orienteers in Kainuu Orinteering Week. In 2011 the first city orienteering sprint, organised through the KOW, was run.

== Statistics ==
Year	Participants	H21 E Winner	D21 E Winner
1966	315	Finland Veijo Tahvanainen	Finland Raila Huovi
1967	425	Finland Otto Eronen	Finland Eine Laine
1968	630	Finland Veikko Kostiainen	Finland Eine Laine
1969	712	Finland Veikko Kostiainen	Finland Eine Laine
1970	808	Finland Matti Kattilakoski	Finland Kaarina Karsi
1971	766	Finland Veikko Kostiainen	Finland Eeva Lahtonen
1972	834	Finland Veikko Kostiainen	Finland Aila Flöjt
1973	988	Finland Erkki Oikarinen	Finland Eine Laine
1975	1 247	Finland Veikko Koistinen	Finland Aila Flöjt
1976	1 333	Finland Seppo Keskinarkaus	Finland Sinikka Kukkonen
1977	1 321	Finland Veijo Parviainen	Finland Sirkka Ketola
1978	1 692	Finland Esa Turunen	Finland Sinikka Kukkonen
1979	2 081	Finland Seppo Keskinarkaus	Finland Liisa Veijalainen
1980	2 167	Finland Heikki Peltola	Finland Kaija Dahlman
1981	2 155	Finland Simo Nurminen	Finland Liisa Veijalainen
1982	2 185	Finland Jorma Karvonen	Finland Annariitta Lonka
1983	2 602	Finland Raimo Tolonen	Finland Pirjo Mattila
1984	2 325	Sweden Erik Svensson	Sweden Annichen Kringstad-Svensson
1985	2 630	Finland Taisto Kemppainen	Norway Brit Volden
1986	3 930	Finland Keijo Parkkinen	Finland Annariitta Kottonen
1987	3 660	Finland Keijo Parkkinen	Finland Tellervo Parviainen
1988	4 163	Finland Reijo Mattinen	Finland Annika Viilo
1989	3 034	Finland Keijo Parkkinen	Finland Teresa Mäki-Kamppi
1990	4 020	Finland Matti Karvonen	Finland Riitta Karjalainen
1991	4 552	Finland Jarmo Reiman	Finland Ulla Mänttäri
1992	3 884	Latvia Aigars Leiboms	Czech Republic Jana Cierslarová
1993	3 853	Finland Timo Karppinen	Finland Marja-Liisa Portin
1994	3 130	Finland Timo Karppinen	Finland Kirsi Tiira
1995	3 103	Finland Timo Karppinen	Finland Kirsi Tiira
1996	4 055	Finland Timo Karppinen	Finland Kirsi Tiira
1997	3 013	Finland Timo Karppinen	Finland Johanna Asklöf
1998	3 102	Finland Jani Lakanen	Finland Anniina Paronen
1999	2 542	Finland Timo Karppinen	Finland Johanna Asklöf
2000	2 593	Finland Kenneth Cederberg	Finland Liisa Anttila
2001	2 872	Australia Troy de Haas	Finland Paula Haapakoski
2002	2 500	Finland Simo Martomaa	Finland Salla Sukki
2003	3 800	Finland Jani Lakanen	Finland Minna Kauppi
2004	3 239	Finland Kim Fagerudd	Finland Salla Sukki
2005	3 780	Russia Valentin Novikov	Russia Julia Novikova
2006	3 074	Finland Jani Lakanen	Finland Heli Jukkola
2007	4 884	Finland Pasi Ikonen	Finland Heli Jukkola
2008	3 503	Finland Jonne Lakanen	Finland Sofia Haajanen
2009	3 312	Finland Jonne Lakanen	Finland Anne-Mari Leskinen
2010	3 652	Finland Pasi Ikonen	Finland Minna Kauppi
2011	3 354	Sweden Fredrik Johansson	Latvia Inga Dambe
2012	Kajaani	Finland Jani Lakanen	Finland Karoliina Sundberg
2013	Vuokatti		
2015	Suomussalmi		

== See also ==
- Jukola relay
