= Angelniemen Ankkuri =

Sports club in Finland

Angelniemen Ankkuri is an orienteering club in Salo, Finland. It was founded in 1946 as club for sports and gymnastics, but nowadays it has only orienteering. Its members have won 17 medals in Finnish championships. It has won Tiomila, the Venla relay and the Jukola relay.

The club came second in 25-manna in 1994 when Johan Ivarsson managed to keep the distance to Pekka Pallaspuro.

The orienteers Johanna Asklöf, Kirsi Boström, Ari Kattainen, Mika Kuisma, Marika Mikkola, Matti Mäkinen and Seppo Väli-Klemelä have run for the club.

== Halikko relay ==
The club has organised the Halikko relay in late autumn since 1989. The teams are composed of 15 runners.
