= Petri Forsman =

Finnish orienteering competitor

Medal record

Men's orienteering

Representing Finland

World Championships
Bronze medal – third place	1993 West Point	Relay

Petri Forsman (born 13 December 1968) is a Finnish Adventure Racing World Champion (2001), and a successful orienteering competitor and bronze medalist in orienteering in relay at the World Championships (1993).

Forsman's elite-level career has spanned nearly four decades, starting with his first Jukola relay victory at the age of 18 in 1987, and culminating in his ARWS Hall of Fame nomination in 2025 at the age of 56. He is one of the very few endurance athletes in the world to have remained internationally competitive for such a long period of time.

Petri Forsman won the Adventure Racing World Championship in 2001 (at age of 33 years), and as the captain of the Team Nokia Adventure from Finland. Forsman's team members were Jukka Pinola, Mika Hirvinen, and Elina Maki-Rautila and they did win the first ever Adventure Racing World Championship in Switzerland in 2001. In addition, Forsman has been placed second in 2006 in Team Finland. Furthermore, Forsman has had a long and successful career in adventure racing, mainly representing Halti Adventure Team

- Raid G. 2000, second place

- EURO AR 2005, first place

- EURO AR 2009, first place

- Wulong 2012, second place

- Stockholm Extreme 2012, second place

- Rogua G 2013, first place

- Stockholm Extreme 2014, second place

- Rogua G 2014, first place

- Czech Adventure Race 2017, first place

Adventure Racer Petri Forsman was nominated for the ARWS Hall of Fame 31 August 2025 (at age of 56 years) by ARWS during the AR European Championships in 2025.

In addition, Forsman is orienteering competitor. He received a bronze medal in the relay event at the 1993 (at the age of 25 years) World Orienteering Championships in West Point, together with Keijo Parkkinen, Mika Kuisma and Timo Karppinen.

Forsman won the Jukola relay three times, of which the first gold medal at the age of 18 in 1987:

- in 1987 (Finnish team Hiidenkiertäjät)

- in 1991 (Swedish team IKF Södertälje), and

- in 1994 (Finnish team Turun Suunnistajat).

In addition, Forsman has won the Tiomila relay twice:

- in 1992 (Swedish team IFK Södertälje) and

- in 1994 (Finnish team Turun Suunnistajat).

== See also ==
- List of orienteers
- List of orienteering events
