= Mikael Boström =

Finnish orienteering competitor

Medal record

Men's orienteering

Representing Finland

World Championships
Silver medal – second place	1997 Grimstad	Relay
Silver medal – second place	1999 Inverness	Relay

Junior World Championships
Gold medal – first place	1990 Älvsbyn	Individual
Gold medal – first place	1990 Älvsbyn	Relay

Mikael Boström (born 3 October 1970 in Siuntio) is a Finnish orienteering competitor, and winner of the first Junior World Orienteering Championships in 1990, both individual and relay.

== Senior career ==
He received a silver medal in the relay at the World Orienteering Championships in Grimstad in 1997 (with Timo Karppinen, Juha Peltola and Janne Salmi), and again a silver medal in Inverness in 1999 (with Jani Lakanen, Juha Peltola and Janne Salmi).

== See also ==
- Finnish orienteers
- List of orienteers
- List of orienteering events
