= Katarina Borg =

Swedish orienteering competitor

Medal record

Women's orienteering

Representing Sweden

World Championships
Silver medal – second place	1997 Grimstad	Classic
Silver medal – second place	1987 Gérardmer	Relay

World Cup
Bronze medal – third place	1990	WC Overall
Bronze medal – third place	1998	WC Overall

Katarina Borg (born 21 March 1964) is a Swedish orienteering competitor. She has received two silver medals in the world championships, and finished overall third in the Orienteering World Cup two times.

== World championships ==
She participated at the 1987 World Orienteering Championships, where she received a silver medal with the Swedish team (Arja Hannus, Marita Skogum and Karin Rabe). She received a silver medal in the classic distance at the 1997 World Championships.

== World cup ==
Borg finished third overall at the 1990 Orienteering World Cup, behind Ragnhild Bente Andersen and Ragnhild Bratberg. She finished overall third also in 1998, behind Hanne Staff and Johanna Asklöf.
