= Iva Knapová-Kalibánová-Kusynová =

Czechoslovak orienteer (born 1960)

Medal record

Women's orienteering

Representing Czechoslovakia

World Championships
Silver medal – second place	1983 Zalaegerszeg	Relay
Bronze medal – third place	1987 Gérardmer	Relay

Iva Knapová-Kalibánová-Kusynová (born 2 July 1960) is an orienteering competitor who competed for Czechoslovakia. She won a silver medal in the relay at the 1983 World Orienteering Championships in Zalaegerszeg, together with Eva Bártová, Jana Hlaváčová and Ada Kuchařová. At the 1987 World Orienteering Championships in Gérardmer she won a bronze medal in the relay with the Czechoslovak team, which in addition to Kalibanová consisted of Iva Slaninová, Ada Kuchařová and Jana Galíková.
