= Torben Skovlyst =

Danish orienteering competitor

Medal record

Men's orienteering

Representing Denmark

World Championships
Gold medal – first place	1997 Grimstad	Relay

Torben Skovlyst is a Danish orienteering competitor and World champion. He won a gold medal in the 1997 World Orienteering Championships in Grimstad with the Danish relay team (Carsten Jørgensen, Chris Terkelsen and Allan Mogensen).

== See also ==
- Danish orienteers
- List of orienteers
- List of orienteering events
