= Mária Honzová =

Czech orienteering competitor

Medal record

Women's orienteering

Representing Czech Republic

World Championships
Bronze medal – third place	1993 West Point	Relay
Bronze medal – third place	1995 Detmold	Relay

Mária Honzová (born 17 December 1969) is a Czech orienteering competitor.

== Career ==
Honzová received a bronze medal in the relay event at the 1993 World Orienteering Championships in West Point, together with Petra Novotná, Marcela Kubatková and Jana Cieslarová. In the 1995 World Championships in Detmold she again received a bronze medal in relay, with the same Czech team.

She finished 14th in the classic distance in 1993, 16th in the short distance in 1995, and 20th in the short distance in Grimstad in 1997.

== See also ==
- Czech orienteers
- List of orienteers
- List of orienteering events
