= Kimmo Rauhamäki =

Finnish orienteering competitor

Medal record

Men's orienteering

Representing Finland

World Championships
Bronze medal – third place	1976 Aviemore	Relay

Kimmo Rauhamäki (born 31 March 1951 in Längelmäki) is a Finnish orienteering competitor. He received a bronze medal in the relay event at the 1976 World Orienteering Championships in Aviemore, together with Hannu Mäkirinta, Markku Salminen and Matti Mäkinen. He won the 1977 Jukola relay.

== See also ==
- Finnish orienteers
- List of orienteers
- List of orienteering events
