= Lars Holmqvist =

Swedish orienteering competitor

Medal record

Men's orienteering

Representing Sweden

World Championships
Bronze medal – third place	1995 Detmold	Relay

Lars Holmqvist (born 1 September 1961) is a Swedish orienteering competitor. He received a bronze medal in the relay event at the 1995 World Orienteering Championships in Detmold, together with Jimmy Birklin, Johan Ivarsson and Jörgen Mårtensson, and placed fifth in the short distance. He placed 12th in the overall Orienteering World Cup in 1994.
