= Dominik Humbel =

Swiss orienteering competitor

Medal record

Men's orienteering

Representing Switzerland

World Championships
Gold medal – first place	1993 West Point	Relay

Dominik Humbel is a Swiss orienteering competitor and world champion. He won a gold medal at the 1993 World Orienteering Championships in West Point with the Swiss relay team (Christian Aebersold, Urs Flühmann and Thomas Bührer).
