= Marja Liisa Portin =

Finnish orienteering competitor (born 1966)

Personal information
- Born: 5 January 1966 (age 60)

Sport
- Sport: Orienteering

Achievements and titles
- World finals: 3
Medal record
Women's orienteering
Representing Finland
World Championships
Bronze medal – third place	1989 Skövde	Relay

Marja Liisa Autti (née Portin; born 5 January 1966) is a Finnish orienteering competitor. She won a bronze medal in the relay event at the 1989 World Orienteering Championships in Skövde, together with Ulla Mänttäri, Annika Viilo and Eija Koskivaara.

== Career ==
Marja Liisa Portin participated in three WOC events. In WOC Bendigo, Australia 1985 she placed 22nd in Individual event and a sixth place in relay event with Riitta Karjalainen, Ulla Mänttäri and Annariitta Kottonen. In WOC Sweden 1989 she placed 13th in the individual event. In Karlovy Vary 1991 she took 8th place in short distance, 11th in Classic Distance and 5th place in relay event together with Mari Lukkarinen, Kirsi Tiira and Eija Koskivaara.

Marja Liisa also has a long history in Nordic Orienteering Championships (NOM). She debuted in 1984 in Balsfjord Municipality, Norway, where she placed 5th in women's junior class and received a bronze medal in women's junior relay event together with Annika Heino, Ulla Mänttäri and Tiina Äijälä. in 1986 Saltvik, Åland she placed 6th in women's junior class. 1990 in Fanø, Denmark she took 8th place in senior class. 1992 in Rena, Norway she received a bronze medal in women's senior relay event together with Kirsi Tiira, Annika Viilo and Eija Koskivaara. 1993 in Sibbo, Finland she placed 9th in classic distance and 5th in short distance, as well as received Nordic championship gold medal in relay event together with Marja Pyymäki, Kirsi Tiira and Eija Koskivaara.

Marja Liisa received a Master of Science degree in Electronic Engineering from Helsinki University of Technology in 1991, and works as a Patent Attorney at Boco IP.

== See also ==
- List of orienteers
- List of orienteering events
