= Ulla Mänttäri =

Finnish orienteering competitor

Medal record

Women's orienteering

Representing Finland

World Championships
Bronze medal – third place	1989 Skövde	Relay

Ulla Mänttäri is a Finnish orienteering competitor. She received a bronze medal in the relay event at the 1989 World Orienteering Championships in Skövde, together with Marja Liisa Portin, Annika Viilo and Eija Koskivaara.

== See also ==
- Finnish orienteers
- List of orienteers
- List of orienteering events
