= Peter Ivars =

Finnish orienteering competitor

Medal record

Men's orienteering

Representing Finland

World Championships
Bronze medal – third place	1989 Skövde	Relay

Peter Ivars is a Finnish orienteering competitor. He received a bronze medal in the relay event at the 1989 World Orienteering Championships in Skövde, together with Keijo Parkkinen, Ari Kattainen and Reijo Mattinen.

== See also ==
- List of orienteers
- List of orienteering events
