= Iva Slaninová =

Czechoslovak orienteering competitor (born 1963)

Medal record

Women's orienteering

Representing Czechoslovakia

World Championships
| Bronze medal – third place | 1987 Gérardmer | Relay |

Iva Slaninová (married Mádlová; born 1963 in Hradec Králové) is a Czech orienteering competitor who competed for Czechoslovakia. At the 1987 World Orienteering Championships in Gérardmer she won a bronze medal in the relay with the Czechoslovak team, which in addition to Slaninová consisted of Iva Kalibanová, Ada Kuchařová and Jana Galíková.

In 2022, she was inducted into the Czech Orienteering Hall of Fame.
