= Marcela Kubatková =

Czech orienteering competitor

Medal record

Women's orienteering

Representing Czechoslovakia

World Championships
Bronze medal – third place	1991 Mariánské Lázně	Relay

Junior World Championships
Silver medal – second place	1991 Berlin	Long

Representing Czech Republic

World Championships
Bronze medal – third place	1993 West Point	Relay
Bronze medal – third place	1995 Detmold	Relay

Marcela Kubatková (born 13 January 1971) is a Czech orienteering competitor. She received a bronze medal in the relay event at the 1993 World Orienteering Championships in West Point, together with Petra Novotná, Maria Honzová and Jana Cieslarová. In the 1995 World Championships in Detmold she again received a bronze medal in relay, with the same Czech team. She received a bronze medal with the Czechoslovak relay team in Mariánské Lázně 1991.
