= Lars Palmqvist =

Swedish orienteering competitor

Medal record

Men's orienteering

Representing Sweden

World Championships
Silver medal – second place	1985 Bendigo	Relay

Lars Palmqvist (born 28 September 1961) is a Swedish orienteering competitor. He received a silver medal in the relay event at the 1985 World Orienteering Championships in Bendigo, together with Michael Wehlin, Kjell Lauri and Jörgen Mårtensson.

Palmqvist lives with his wife and children in Barkarby, Stockholm.
