= Maria Gustafsson (orienteer) =

Swedish orienteering competitor

Medal record

Women's orienteering

Representing Sweden

World Championships
Silver medal – second place	1995 Detmold	Relay

Maria Gustafsson (born 16 March 1967) is a Swedish orienteering competitor. She received a silver medal in the relay event at the 1995 World Orienteering Championships in Detmold, together with Anette Granstedt, Anna Bogren and Marlena Jansson.
