= Matti Mäkinen =

Finnish orienteering competitor

Medal record

Men's orienteering

Representing Finland

World Championships
Bronze medal – third place	1976 Aviemore	Relay

Matti Mäkinen (born 18 January 1947 in Paimio) is a Finnish orienteering competitor. He received a bronze medal in the relay event at the 1976 World Orienteering Championships in Aviemore, together with Hannu Mäkirinta, Markku Salminen and Kimmo Rauhamäki. He won the Jukola relay in 1973.

== See also ==
- List of orienteers
- List of orienteering events
