= Petra Novotná (orienteer) =

Czech orienteering competitor (born 1966)

Medal record

Women's orienteering

Representing Czechoslovakia

Representing Czech Republic

World Championships
Silver medal – second place	1989 Skövde	Relay
Bronze medal – third place	1993 West Point	Relay
Bronze medal – third place	1995 Detmold	Relay

Petra Novotná (née Wagnerová, born 23 February 1966) is a Czech orienteering competitor. At the 1989 World Orienteering Championships in Skövde, she won a silver medal in the relay with the Czechoslovak team. She received a bronze medal in the relay event at the 1993 World Orienteering Championships, together with Maria Honzová, Marcela Kubatková and Jana Cieslarová. In the 1995 World championships, she again received a bronze medal in relay, with the same Czech team.

She finished 16th in the short distance and 19th in the classic distance in 1991. She won the B-final in the short distance in 1993.

== See also ==
- Czech orienteers
- Czechoslovak orienteers
- List of orienteers
- List of orienteering events
