= Daniel Hotz =

Swiss orienteering competitor

Sport
- Sport: Orienteering
Medal record
Men's orienteering
Representing Switzerland
World Championships
Gold medal – first place	1995 Detmold	Relay

Daniel Hotz (born 1967) is a Swiss orienteering competitor and World champion. He won a gold medal at the 1995 World Orienteering Championships in Detmold with the Swiss relay team (Alain Berger, Christian Aebersold and Urs Flühmann).
