= Hans Melin =

Swedish orienteering competitor

Medal record

Men's orienteering

Representing Sweden

World Championships
Bronze medal – third place	1987 Gerardmer	Relay

Hans Melin is a Swedish orienteering competitor. He received a bronze medal in the relay event at the 1987 World Orienteering Championships in Gerardmer, together with Kent Olsson, Jörgen Mårtensson and Lars Lönnkvist.
