= Markus Stappung =

Swiss orienteering competitor

Medal record

Men's orienteering

Representing Switzerland

World Championships
Silver medal – second place	1987 Gérardmer	Relay

Markus Stappung is a Swiss orienteering competitor. He participated at the 1987 World Orienteering Championships in Gérardmer, where he won a silver medal in the relay, together with Stefan Bolliger, Kaspar Öttli and Urs Flühmann.
