= Rudolf Ropek =

Czech photographer and orienteering competitor

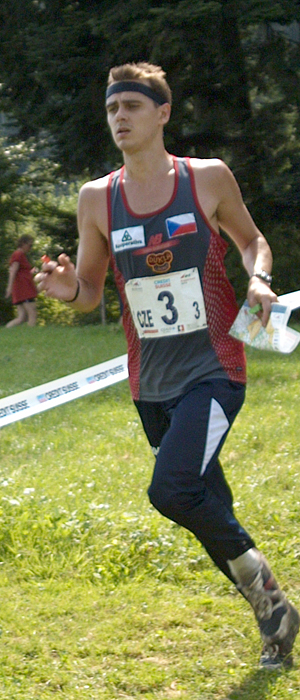

Medal record

Men's orienteering

Representing Czech Republic

World Championships
Silver medal – second place	2003 Rapperswil-Jona	Sprint
Bronze medal – third place	2001 Tampere	Relay

European Championships
Silver medal – second place	2000 Truskavets	Relay

Rudolf Ropek (born 4 October 1970 in Potštejn) is a Czech photographer and former orienteering competitor.

== Orienteering ==
Ropek received a bronze medal in the relay at the 2001 World Orienteering Championships with the Czech team, and a silver medal in the sprint distance in 2003.

He received a silver medal in relay at the 2000 European Orienteering Championships in Truskavets.

== Wander Book project ==
Ropek makes a living as a photographer and entrepreneur. In 2008, he founded the Wander Book (Wander Cards) project whose idea was to create easily storable collectible souvenirs and support tourism. Wander Cards are stickers with photos of tourist destinations or commemorating tourist and cultural events, which mainly cover the Czech Republic, its neighbouring countries (Slovakia, Poland, Austria, Germany) and Hungary.

== See also ==
- Czech orienteers
- List of orienteers
- List of orienteering events
