= Petter Thoresen =

Petter Thoresen may refer to:

- Petter Thoresen (ice hockey) (born 1961), Norwegian ice hockey coach and former player
- Petter Thoresen (orienteer) (born 1966), Norwegian orienteering competitor
- Petter Thoresen (badminton) (born 1955), Norwegian badminton player
