= Bolliger =

Bolliger is a surname. Notable people with the surname include:

- Manfred Bolliger (born 1962), Swiss wheelchair curler, Paralympian 2006 and 2010
- Peter Bolliger (born 1937), Swiss rower
- Stefan Bolliger, orienteer

== See also ==
- Bolliger & Mabillard, an engineering company
