= Seppo Väli-Klemelä =

Finnish orienteering competitor

Medal record

Men's orienteering

Representing Finland

World Championships
Silver medal – second place	1974 Viborg	Relay

Seppo Väli-Klemelä (born 13 November 1949) is a Finnish orienteering competitor. He received a silver medal in the relay event at the 1974 World Orienteering Championships in Viborg, together with Hannu Mäkirinta, Markku Salminen and Risto Nuuros. He won the 1973 Jukola relay.

== See also ==
- List of orienteers
- List of orienteering events
