= 1991 World Orienteering Championships =

1991 edition of the World Orienteering Championships

- Host city: Mariánské Lázně
- Country: Czechoslovakia
- Events: 6

The 1991 World Orienteering Championships, the 14th World Orienteering Championships, were held in Mariánské Lázně, Czechoslovakia, 21–25 August 1991.

The championships had six events; the classic distance (formerly called individual) for men and women, the short distance for men and women, and relays for men and women.

== Medalists ==
Event	Gold		Silver		Bronze	
Men's classic distance	Jörgen Mårtensson (SWE)	1.49.25	Kent Olsson (SWE)	1.53.37	Sixten Sild (URS)	1.53.48
Women's classic distance	Katalin Olah (HUN)	1.19.52	Christina Blomqvist (SWE)	1.21.04	Jana Galíková (TCH)	1.21.18
Men's short distance	Petr Kozák (TCH)	29.20	Kent Olsson (SWE)	29.57	Martin Johansson (SWE)	30.17
Women's short distance	Jana Cieslarová (TCH)	32.09	Ada Kuchařová (TCH)	32.29	Marita Skogum (SWE)	32.41
Men's relay	Switzerland (SUI): Thomas Bührer; Alain Berger; Urs Flühmann; Christian Aebersold	4.42.38	Norway (NOR): Petter Thoresen; Bjørnar Valstad; Rolf Vestre; Håvard Tveite	4.43.00	Finland (FIN): Reijo Mattinen; Ari Anjala; Mika Kuisma; Keijo Parkkinen	4.44.19
Women's relay	Sweden (SWE): Arja Hannus; Christina Blomqvist; Marlena Jansson; Marita Skogum	3.38.29	Norway (NOR): Hanne Sandstad; Heidi Arnesen; Ragnhild Bratberg; Ragnhild Bente Andersen	3.40.20	Czechoslovakia (TCH): Marcela Kubatková; Jana Galíková; Ada Kuchařová; Jana Cieslarová	3.43.30
