= Håkan Eriksson =

Håkan Eriksson may refer to:

- Håkan Eriksson (orienteer) (born 1961), Swedish orienteering competitor
- Håkan Eriksson (ice hockey) (born 1956), retired Swedish ice hockey player
