= Katalin Oláh =

Hungarian orienteering competitor

Medal record

Women's orienteering

Representing Hungary

World Championships
Gold medal – first place	1991 Mariánské Lázně	Classic
Gold medal – first place	1995 Detmold	Classic

Katalin Oláh (born 6 July 1968) is a Hungarian orienteering competitor. She won the 1991 and 1995 Classic distance World Orienteering Championships.
