= Klemelä =

Klemelä is a Finnish-language surname that may refer to:

- Kosti Klemelä (1920–2006), Finnish actor
- Sanni Klemelä (born 1990), Finnish long-distance runner who competed in the 2010 European Team Championships Super League
- Seppo Väli-Klemelä, Finnish orienteer
