= Kerstin Haglund =

Swedish orienteering competitor

Medal record

Women's orienteering

Representing Sweden

World Championships
Gold medal – first place	1989 Skövde	Relay

Kerstin Haglund is a Swedish orienteering competitor. She is Relay World Champion from 1989, as a member of the Swedish winning team.
