= Hotz =

Hotz is a surname. Notable people with the surname include:

- Daniel Hotz, Swiss orienteer
- Eric Hotz, Canadian graphic artist and illustrator
- George Hotz (born 1989), American security hacker
- Günter Hotz (born 1931), German computer scientist
- Jeremy Hotz (born 1963), Canadian actor and comedian
- Jimmy Hotz (1953–2023), American record producer and musician
- Julia Hotz (born 1993), American journalist and author
- Karl Hotz (1877–1941), German engineer and soldier
- Kenny Hotz (born 1967), Canadian producer, writer, director, actor, and comedian
- Kyle Hotz, American comic book writer and artist
- Sven Hotz (1929–2025), Swiss entrepreneur and football president
