= Petra Novotná =

Petra Novotná may refer to:

- Petra Novotná (orienteer)
- Petra Novotná (volleyball)
