= Sabrina Meister-Fesseler =

Swiss orienteering competitor

Medal record

Women's orienteering

Representing Switzerland

World Championships
Bronze medal – third place	1997 Grimstad	Relay

Sabrina Meister-Fesseler (born 1 September 1966) is a Swiss orienteering competitor. At the World Orienteering Championships in Grimstad in 1997 she placed 7th in the classic distance, 14th in the short distance, and won a bronze medal with the Swiss relay team. She placed fifth with the Swiss relay team at the World Orienteering Championships in Inverness in 1999.
