= Maria Gustafsson =

Maria Gustafsson may refer to:

- Maria Gustafsson (writer) (1946–2025), Swedish actress, author and model
- Maria Gustafsson (orienteer) (born 1969), Swedish orienteer

== See also ==
- Pia-Maria Gustafsson (born 1977), Finnish figure skater, competed in 1999 Finnish Figure Skating Championships
- Gustafsson (disambiguation)
