= Håvard Tveite =

Norwegian orienteer (1962–2021)

Personal information
- Born: 5 March 1962 Ås, Norway
- Died: 30 May 2021 (aged 59) Ås, Norway
Medal record
Men's orienteering
World Championships
Gold medal – first place	1987 Gérardmer	Relay
Bronze medal – third place	1989 Skövde	Individual
Gold medal – first place	1989 Skövde	Relay
Silver medal – second place	1991 Mariánské Lázně	Relay
Bronze medal – third place	1997 Grimstad	Relay
World Cup
Gold medal – first place	1990	WC Overall
Bronze medal – third place	1988	WC Overall

Håvard Tveite (5 March 1962 – 30 May 2021) was a Norwegian orienteering competitor. He was Relay World Champion from 1987 and 1989, and has a silver medal from 1991 and a bronze medal from 1997. He also obtained bronze in the individual course at the 1989 World Orienteering Championships.

He was winner of the overall Orienteering World Cup in 1990, and placed third in the overall cup in 1988. He represented the sports clubs Ås IL and NTHI. He won the 1989 and 1990 Jukola relay, with NTHI.

Tveite was a member of the International Orienteering Federation Map Commission. He joined the IOF Map Commission in 2002 and became Chairman of the commission in 2007. He remained as Chairman until 2017. During his term the IOF International Specifications for Orienteering Maps went through multiple important revisions as the digitalisation of mapping and map printing processes became the norm. He was awarded an IOF Silver Pin for his service to the IOF in 2017.

Tveite was also a regular contributor to the QGIS project, contributing to documentation and developing various plugins.
