= William Lind =

William Lind may refer to:

- William S. Lind (born 1947), American conservative author
- William Lind (orienteer) (born 1985), Swedish orienteering competitor
