= 1987 World Orienteering Championships =

1987 edition of the World Orienteering Championships

- Host city: Gérardmer
- Country: France
- Events: 4

The 1987 World Orienteering Championships, the 12th World Orienteering Championships, were held in Gérardmer, France, 3–5 September 1987.

The championships had four events; individual contests for men and women, and relays for men and women.

== Medalists ==
Event	Gold		Silver		Bronze	
Men's individual	Kent Olsson (SWE)	1.37.19	Tore Sagvolden (NOR)	1.38.18	Urs Flühmann (SUI)	1.39.30
Women's individual	Arja Hannus (SWE)	1.07.40	Karin Rabe (SWE)	1.07.56	Jana Galíková (TCH)	1.08.39
Men's relay	Norway (NOR): Morten Berglia; Håvard Tveite; Tore Sagvolden; Øyvin Thon	4.11.21	Switzerland (SUI): Markus Stappung; Stefan Bolliger; Kaspar Oettli; Urs Flühmann	4.16.05	Sweden (SWE): Kent Olsson; Hans Melin; Jörgen Mårtensson; Lars Lönnkvist	4.17.07
Women's relay	Norway (NOR): Ragnhild Bratberg; Ragnhild Bente Andersen; Ellen Sofie Olsvik; Brit Volden	3.44.04	Sweden (SWE): Arja Hannus; Katarina Borg; Marita Skogum; Karin Rabe	3.45.07	Czechoslovakia (TCH): Iva Kalibanová; Iva Slaninová; Ada Kuchařová; Jana Galíková	3.56.32
