= Roman Efimov =

Russian orienteering competitor

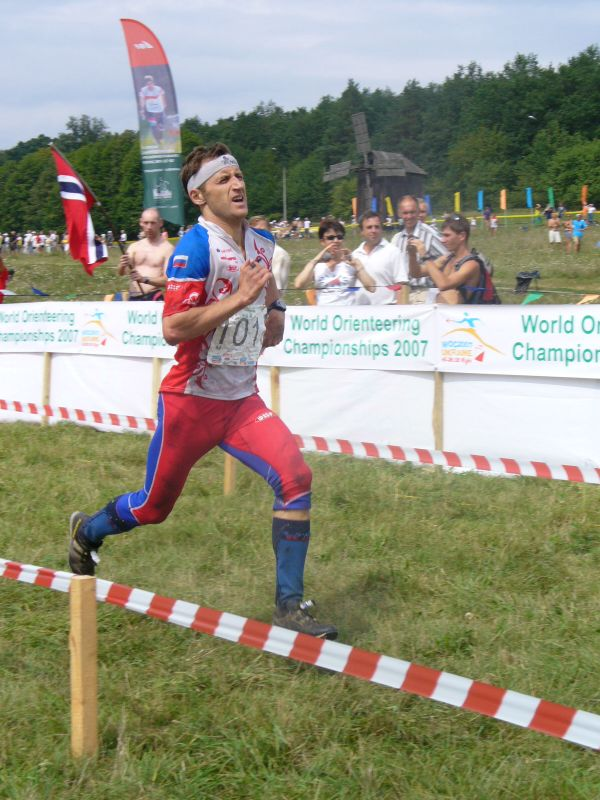

Medal record

Men's orienteering

Representing Russia

World Championships
Gold medal – first place	2006 Aarhus	Relay
Gold medal – first place	2007 Kyiv	Relay

Roman Efimov (born April 7, 1976) is a Russian orienteering competitor. He is two times Relay World Champion, from 2006 in Aarhus, Denmark, and 2007 in Kyiv, Ukraine, as a member of the Russian winning teams.

His wife Natalia Efimova was a member of Russian national orienteering team.

In 2006 the Russian men team (Roman Efimov, Andrey Khramov and Valentin Novikov) won the gold medal in the relay at the World Championships in Denmark (for the first time in Russian history).
