= Eija Koskivaara =

Finnish orienteering competitor

Medal record

Women's orienteering

Representing Finland

World Championships
Gold medal – first place	1995 Detmold	Relay
Silver medal – second place	1995 Detmold	Classic distance
Silver medal – second place	1993 West Point	Relay
Bronze medal – third place	1989 Skaraborg	Relay
Bronze medal – third place	1993 West Point	Short distance

Eija Koskivaara (born 7 May 1965) is a Finnish orienteering competitor and World champion. She won a gold medal at the 1995 World Orienteering Championships in Detmold with the Finnish relay team. She received a silver medal with the relay team in 1993 (West Point), and a bronze medal in 1989 (Skaraborg). She received an individual bronze medal at the 1993 World Championships (Short distance) and a silver medal at the 1995 World Championships (Classic distance).

== See also ==
- Finnish orienteers
- List of orienteers
- List of orienteering events
