= 1993 World Orienteering Championships =

1993 edition of the World Orienteering Championships

- Host city: West Point, New York
- Country: United States
- Events: 6

The 1993 World Orienteering Championships, the 15th World Orienteering Championships, were held in West Point, New York, United States, 9–14 October 1993.

The championships had six events; the classic distance (formerly called individual) for men and women, the short distance for men and women, and relays for men and women.

== Medalists ==
Event	Gold		Silver		Bronze	
Men's classic distance	Allan Mogensen (DEN)	1.27.36	Jörgen Mårtensson (SWE)	1.28.07	Petter Thoresen (NOR)	1.29.28
Women's classic distance	Marita Skogum (SWE)	1.02.47	Annika Viilo (FIN)	1.04.42	Yvette Hague (GBR)	1.06.09
Men's short distance	Petter Thoresen (NOR)	22.34	Timo Karppinen (FIN)	23.00	Martin Johansson (SWE)	23.26
Women's short distance	Anna Bogren (SWE)	20.39	Marita Skogum (SWE)	21.10	Eija Koskivaara (FIN)	21.11
Men's relay	Switzerland (SUI): Dominik Humbel; Christian Aebersold; Urs Flühmann; Thomas Bührer	3.37.16	Great Britain (GBR): Jonathan Musgrave; Martin Bagness; Stephen Palmer; Steven Hale	3.37.31	Finland (FIN): Keijo Parkkinen; Mika Kuisma; Petri Forsman; Timo Karppinen	3.38.20
Women's relay	Sweden (SWE): Anette Nilsson; Marlena Jansson; Anna Bogren; Marita Skogum	2.48.48	Finland (FIN): Johanna Tiira; Kirsi Tiira; Annika Viilo; Eija Koskivaara	2.56.59	Czech Republic (CZE): Petra Novotna; Maria Honzova; Marcela Kubatkova; Jana Cieslarova	3.00.29
