= 1995 World Orienteering Championships =

1995 edition of the World Orienteering Championships

- Host city: Detmold
- Country: Germany
- Events: 6

The 1995 World Orienteering Championships, the 16th World Orienteering Championships, were held in Detmold, Germany, 15–20 August 1995.

The championships had six events; the classic distance (formerly called individual) for men and women, the short distance for men and women, and relays for men and women.

== Medalists ==
Event	Gold		Silver		Bronze	
Men's classic distance	Jörgen Mårtensson (SWE)	1:30:19	Janne Salmi (FIN)	1:32:04	Carsten Jørgensen (DEN)	1:33:37
Women's classic distance	Katalin Olah (HUN)	1:05:50	Yvette Hague (GBR); Eija Koskivaara (FIN)	1:08:39		
Men's short distance	Yuri Omeltchenko (UKR)	30:25	Jörgen Mårtensson (SWE)	31:31	Bjørnar Valstad (NOR)	31:36
Women's short distance	Marie-Luce Romanens (SUI)	28:55	Yvette Hague (GBR)	29:16	Marlena Jansson (SWE); Anna Bogren (SWE)	29:29
Men's relay	Switzerland (SUI): Alain Berger; Daniel Hotz; Christian Aebersold; Thomas Bührer	3:34:21	Finland (FIN): Keijo Parkkinen; Reijo Mattinen; Timo Karppinen; Janne Salmi	3:35:43	Sweden (SWE): Lars Holmqvist; Jimmy Birklin; Johan Ivarsson; Jörgen Mårtensson	3:35:51
Women's relay	Finland (FIN): Kirsi Tiira; Reeta-Mari Kolkkala; Eija Koskivaara; Annika Viilo	2:50:33	Sweden (SWE): Anette Granstedt; Maria Gustafsson; Anna Bogren; Marlena Jansson	2:52:11	Czech Republic (CZE): Petra Novotna; Maria Honzova; Marcela Kubatkova; Jana Cieslarova	2:53:06
