= Cecilia Nilsson =

Cecilia Nilsson may refer to:

- Cecilia Nilsson (actress) (born 1957), Swedish actress
- Cecilia Nilsson (athlete) (born 1979), Swedish retired hammer thrower
- Cecilia Nilsson (orienteer) (born 1966), Swedish orienteering competitor
