= Marlena Jansson =

Swedish orienteering competitor

Medal record

Women's orienteering

Representing Sweden

World Championships
Gold medal – first place	1991 Marianske Lazne	Relay
Gold medal – first place	1993 West Point	Relay
Gold medal – first place	1997 Grimstad	Relay
Silver medal – second place	1995 Detmold	Relay
Bronze medal – third place	1995 Detmold	Short
Bronze medal – third place	1999 Inverness	Relay

World Cup
Gold medal – first place	1994	WC Overall
Silver medal – second place	1996	WC Overall

Junior World Championships
Silver medal – second place	1990 Älvsbyn	Individual
Silver medal – second place	1990 Älvsbyn	Relay

Marlena Jansson (born 20 November 1970) is a Swedish orienteering competitor. She is three times Relay World Champion as a member of the Swedish winning team in 1991, 1993 and 1997, as well as having a silver medal from 1995 and a bronze medal from 1999. She also shared bronze with Anna Bogren in the Short distance World Championship in 1995. She obtained the first place in the Overall World Cup in 1994 and second one in 1996. She is five times individual Swedish Champion (1987, 1990, 1995, 1997 and 1998), and Nordic Relay Champion from 1992.
