= 2006 World Orienteering Championships =

2006 edition of the World Orienteering Championships

- Host city: Aarhus
- Country: Denmark
- Events: 8

The 2006 World Orienteering Championships, the 23rd World Orienteering Championships, were held in Aarhus, Denmark, 1 –5 August 2006.

The championships had eight events; sprint for men and women, middle distance for men and women, long distance (formerly called individual or classic distance) for men and women, and relays for men and women.

== Medalists ==
Event	Gold		Silver		Bronze	
Men's sprint	Emil Wingstedt (SWE)	13:35.3	Daniel Hubmann (SUI)	13:36.3	Claus Bloch (DEN)	13:37.0
Women's sprint	Hanny Allston (AUS)	13:13.3	Simone Niggli-Luder (SUI)	13:19.1	Kajsa Nilsson (SWE)	13:24.3
Men's middle distance	Holger Hott Johansen (NOR)	35:49.4	Jarkko Huovila (FIN)		Jamie Stevenson (GBR)	
Women's middle distance	Simone Niggli-Luder (SUI)	33:58.1	Marianne Andersen (NOR)		Tatiana Ryabkina (RUS)	
Men's long distance	Jani Lakanen (FIN)	1:45:01,0	Marc Lauenstein (SUI)		Andrey Khramov (RUS)	
Women's long distance	Simone Niggli-Luder (SUI)	1:19:50.4	Marianne Andersen (NOR)		Dana Brozková (CZE)	
Men's relay	Russia (RUS): Roman Efimov; Andrey Khramov; Valentin Novikov	2:11:41	Finland (FIN): Mats Haldin; Jarkko Huovila; Jani Lakanen		Sweden (SWE): Niclas Jonasson; Emil Wingstedt; Mattias Karlsson	
Women's relay	Finland (FIN): Paula Haapakoski; Heli Jukkola; Minna Kauppi	2:21:05	Sweden (SWE): Jenny Johansson; Kajsa Nilsson; Karolina Arewång Höjsgaard		Switzerland (SUI): Martina Fritschy; Vroni König-Salmi; Simone Niggli	
