= Allan Mogensen =

Danish orienteering competitor

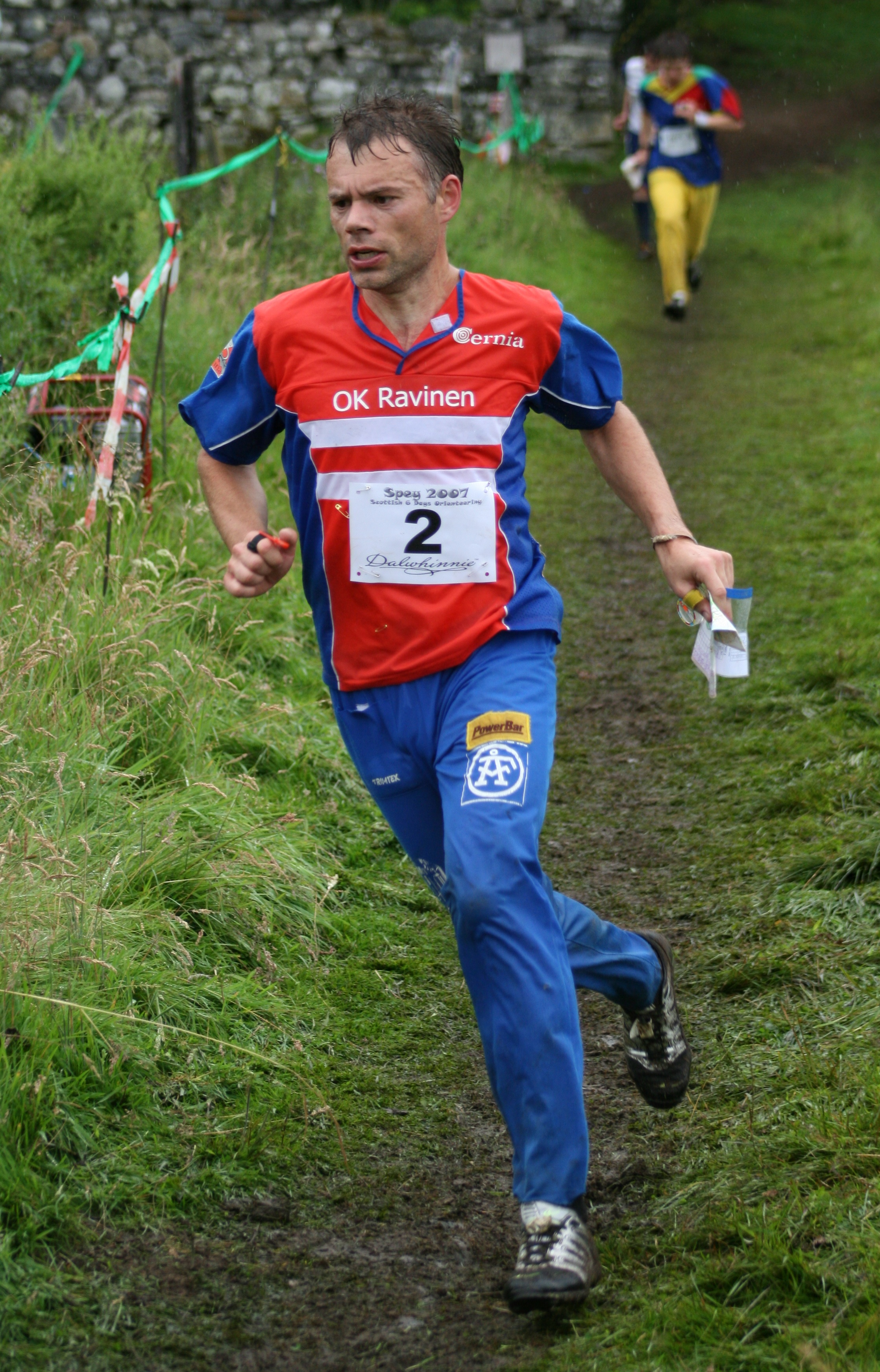
- Mogensen at the Scottish 6 Days (2007)

Personal information
- Nationality: Danish
- Born: 2 November 1967 (age 58)
Medal record
Men's orienteering
Representing Denmark
World Championships
Gold medal – first place	1993 West Point	Classic
Gold medal – first place	1997 Grimstad	Relay
World Cup
Bronze medal – third place	2000	WC Overall

Allan Mogensen (born 2 November 1967) is a Danish orienteering competitor, winner of the 1993 World Orienteering Championship (classic distance), the first male Danish orienteer to win an individual World Championship. He was also a member of the Danish gold-winning team in 1997, and finished 3rd in World Cup 2000. Mogensen won the Jukola relay in 1991.

== See also ==
- Danish orienteers
- List of orienteers
- List of orienteering events
