= 1997 World Orienteering Championships =

1997 edition of the World Orienteering Championships

- Host city: Grimstad
- Country: Norway
- Events: 6

The 1997 World Orienteering Championships, the 17th World Orienteering Championships, were held in Grimstad Municipality, Norway, 11–16 August 1997.

The championships had six events; the classic distance (formerly called individual) for men and women, the short distance for men and women, and relays for men and women.

== Medalists ==
Event	Gold		Silver		Bronze	
Men's classic distance	Petter Thoresen (NOR)	1.40.15	Jörgen Mårtensson (SWE)	1.41.58	Kjetil Bjørlo (NOR)	1.43.04
Women's classic distance	Hanne Staff (NOR)	1.12.56	Katarina Borg (SWE)	1.13.40	Hanne Sandstad (NOR)	1.14.34
Men's short distance	Janne Salmi (FIN)	26.05	Timo Karppinen (FIN)	26.17	Bjørnar Valstad (NOR)	26.27
Women's short distance	Lucie Böhm (AUT)	25.15	Hanne Sandstad (NOR)	25.29	Hanne Staff (NOR); Marie-Luce Romanens (SUI)	25.57
Men's relay	Denmark (DEN); Torben Skovlyst; Carsten Jørgensen; Chris Terkelsen; Allan Mogensen	4.18.58	Finland (FIN); Timo Karppinen; Juha Peltola; Mikael Boström; Janne Salmi	4.19.14	Norway (NOR); Håvard Tveite; Bjørnar Valstad; Kjetil Bjørlo; Petter Thoresen	4.24.27
Women's relay	Sweden (SWE); Anna Bogren; Gunilla Svärd; Cecilia Nilsson; Marlena Jansson	2.51.41	Norway (NOR); Torunn Fossli Sæthre; Elisabeth Ingvaldsen; Hanne Sandstad; Hanne Staff	2.52.56	Switzerland (SUI); Brigitte Wolf; Marie-Luce Romanens; Vroni König; Sabrina Meister	2.56.28

Denmark-Finland-Norway

Sweden-Norway-Switzerland
