= Seppo Keskinarkaus =

Finnish orienteering competitor (born 1949)

Medal record

Men's orienteering

Representing Finland

World Championships
Silver medal – second place	1979 Tampere	Relay

Seppo Keskinarkaus (born 29 September 1949 in Rovaniemi) is a Finnish orienteering competitor. He received a silver medal in the relay event and finished 11th in the individual event at the 1979 World Orienteering Championships in Tampere.

== See also ==
- Finnish orienteers
- List of orienteers
- List of orienteering events
