= 1989 World Orienteering Championships =

1989 edition of the World Orienteering Championships

- Host city: Skövde
- Country: Sweden
- Events: 4

The 1989 World Orienteering Championships, the 13th World Orienteering Championships, were held in Skövde, Sweden, 17–20 August 1989.

The championships had four events; individual contests for men and women, and relays for men and women.

== Medalists ==
Event	Gold		Silver		Bronze	
Men's individual	Petter Thoresen (NOR)	1.36.16	Kent Olsson (SWE)	1.39.26	Håvard Tveite (NOR)	1.39.58
Women's individual	Marita Skogum (SWE)	1.04.06	Jana Galíková (TCH)	1.05.30	Alīda Ābola (URS)	1.08.13
Men's relay	Norway (NOR): Øyvin Thon; Rolf Vestre; Petter Thoresen; Håvard Tveite	4.06.01	Sweden (SWE): Kent Olsson; Michael Wehlin; Jörgen Mårtensson; Håkan Eriksson	4.09.04	Finland (FIN): Keijo Parkkinen; Ari Kattainen; Peter Ivars; Reijo Mattinen	4.10.22
Women's relay	Sweden (SWE): Karin Rabe; Arja Hannus; Kerstin Haglund; Marita Skogum	3.43.46	Czechoslovakia (TCH): Petra Wagnerová; Jana Cieslarová; Ada Kuchařová; Jana Galíková	3.44.01	Finland (FIN): Marja-Liisa Portin; Ulla Mänttäri; Annika Viilo; Eija Koskivaara	3.47.35
