= Petr Kozák =

Czech orienteering competitor (born 1965)

Personal information
- Born: 13 March 1965 (age 61) Prague, Czechoslovakia

Sport
- Sport: Orienteering
Medal record
Men's orienteering
Representing Czechoslovakia
World Championships
Gold medal – first place	1991 Mariánské Lázně	Short

Petr Kozák (born 13 March 1965) is a Czech orienteering competitor, representing Czechoslovakia. He won a gold medal in the short distance at the 1991 World Orienteering Championships.
