= Carsten Jørgensen =

Danish orienteering competitor

Medal record

Representing Denmark

Men's orienteering

World Championships
| Gold medal – first place | 1997 Grimstad | Relay |
| Bronze medal – third place | 1995 Detmold | Classic |

European Championships
| Silver medal – second place | 2004 Roskilde | Relay |
| Bronze medal – third place | 2002 Sümeg | Relay |

Men's athletics

European Cross Country Championships
| Gold medal – first place | 1997 Oeiras | Individual |

Carsten Jørgensen (born 25 October 1970) is a Danish orienteering competitor and World champion. He won a gold medal in the 1997 World Orienteering Championships in Grimstad with the Danish Relay team. He received a bronze medal in the 1995 World Orienteering Championships in Detmold (classic distance).

He has been quite successful in cross country running competitions. He finished fourth at the 1996 European Cross Country Championships and went on to take the gold medal at the 1997 edition. He won the senior race at the Nordic Cross Country Championships consecutively in 1997 and 1998. He competed in the European Championships for a third time in 1998, finishing in fifth place. He was the 1999 winner of the men's race at the Eurocross in Luxembourg.

== National merits ==
Jørgensen is 17 times Danish Orienteering Champion (various disciplines/distances). He has represented Denmark 59 times, on the Danish National Team. He set the Danish record in the 10,000 metres in 1998, and Danish record in the half marathon, also in 1998.

== See also ==
- Danish orienteers
- List of orienteers
- List of orienteering events
