= Michael Wehlin =

Swedish orienteering competitor

Medal record

Men's orienteering

Representing Sweden

World Championships
Silver medal – second place	1985 Bendigo	Relay
Silver medal – second place	1989 Skaraborg	Relay

World Cup
Bronze medal – third place	1986	Overall WC

Michael Wehlin (born 25 February 1962) is a Swedish orienteering competitor. He received silver medals in the relay at the 1985 and 1989 World Orienteering Championships with the Swedish team. He won the Jukola relay in 1986 and 1991.

== World cup ==
He finished 3rd overall in the Orienteering World Cup in 1986, after winner Kent Olsson and 2nd Øyvin Thon.

He finished 5th in 1988, 21st in 1990, and 11th in 1992.
