= Keijo Parkkinen =

Finnish orienteer (born 1965)

Medal record

Men's orienteering

Representing Finland

World Championships
Silver medal – second place	1995 Detmold	Relay
Bronze medal – third place	1989 Skövde	Relay
Bronze medal – third place	1991 Mariánské Lázně	Relay
Bronze medal – third place	1993 West Point	Relay

Keijo Parkkinen (born 28 October 1965) is a Finnish orienteering competitor, four times medalist in the relay at the World Orienteering Championships.

He received a bronze medal in the relay event in 1989, a bronze medal in 1991, a bronze medal in 1993, and a silver medal in 1995. The silver team in 1995 consisted of Parkkinen, Reijo Mattinen, Timo Karppinen, and Janne Salmi.

== See also ==
- Finnish orienteers
- List of orienteers
- List of orienteering events
