= Vroni König-Salmi =

Swiss orienteering competitor

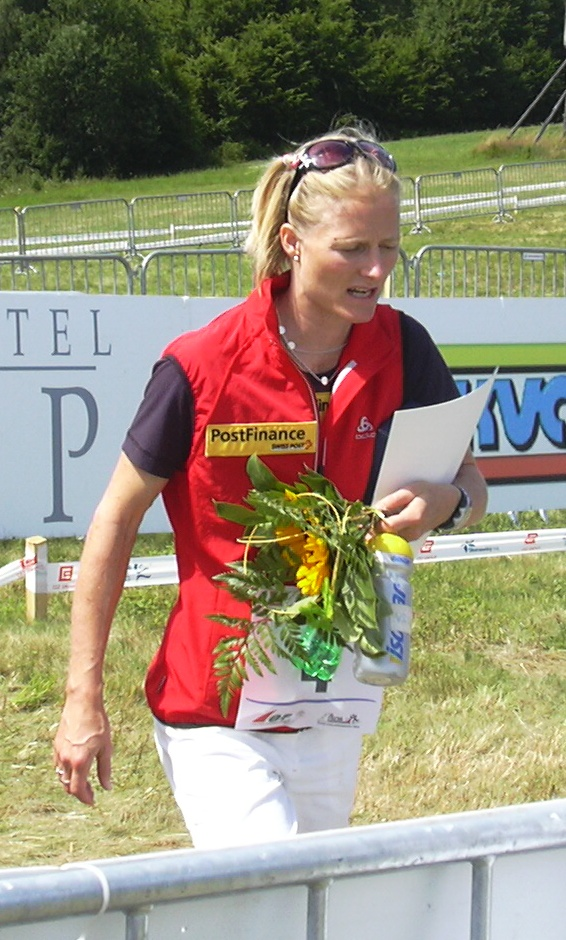
- König-Salmi at WOC 2008

Personal information
- Born: 9 July 1969 (age 56)

Sport
- Sport: Orienteering
Medal record
Women's orienteering
Representing Switzerland
World Championships
Gold medal – first place	2001 Tampere	Sprint
Gold medal – first place	2003 Rapperswil-Jona	Relay
Gold medal – first place	2005 Aichi	Relay
Silver medal – second place	2008 Olomouc	Middle
Bronze medal – third place	1997 Grimstad	Relay
Bronze medal – third place	2005 Aichi	Long
Bronze medal – third place	2006 Aarhus	Relay
World Cup
Silver medal – second place	2002	WC Overall
Silver medal – second place	2005	WC Overall
European Championships
Gold medal – first place	2002 Sümeg	Sprint
Silver medal – second place	2002 Sümeg	Relay
Silver medal – second place	2006 Otepää	Relay
Bronze medal – third place	2010 Primorsko	Relay
Nordic Championships
Gold medal – first place	2005 Notodden	Long
Silver medal – second place	2001 Mikkeli	Short
Bronze medal – third place	2005 Notodden	Relay

Vroni König-Salmi (born 9 July 1969) is a Swiss orienteering competitor and world champion.

== Career ==
König-Salmi won the 2001 Sprint distance World Orienteering Championships, and is two times Relay World Champion, from 2003 and 2005, as member of the Swiss winning teams. Also an individual bronze medal from 2005 (Long distance), and Relay bronze medals from 1997 and 2006. Married to Finnish orienteer Janne Salmi.
