= Martin Johansson (orienteer, born 1964) =

Swedish orienteering competitor (born 1964)

Medal record

Men's orienteering

Representing Sweden

World Championships
Bronze medal – third place	1991 Mariánské Lázně	Short
Bronze medal – third place	1993 West Point	Short

World Cup
Silver medal – second place	1992	Overall WC

Martin Johansson (born 4 December 1964) is a Swedish orienteering competitor who competed in the 1990s. He earned a bronze medal in the short distance at the 1991 World Orienteering Championships. He finished 2nd overall in the Orienteering World Cup in 1992, and won a bronze medal in the short distance at the 1993 World Championships.

Martin is the father of Anton Johansson, who won a bronze medal in the middle distance at the 2025 World Orienteering Championships.
