= Rolf Vestre =

Norwegian orienteer (born 1964)

Medal record

Men's orienteering

Representing Norway

World Championships
Gold medal – first place	1989 Skaraborg	Relay
Silver medal – second place	1991 Marianske Lazne	Relay

Rolf Erlend Vestre (born 1964) is a Norwegian orienteering competitor and World champion. He won a gold medal in the 1989 World Orienteering Championships in Skaraborg with the Norwegian Relay team. He received a silver medal in the 1991 World Orienteering Championships in Mariánské Lázně.

He represented IL Tyrving.
