= Potštejn =

- Municipality
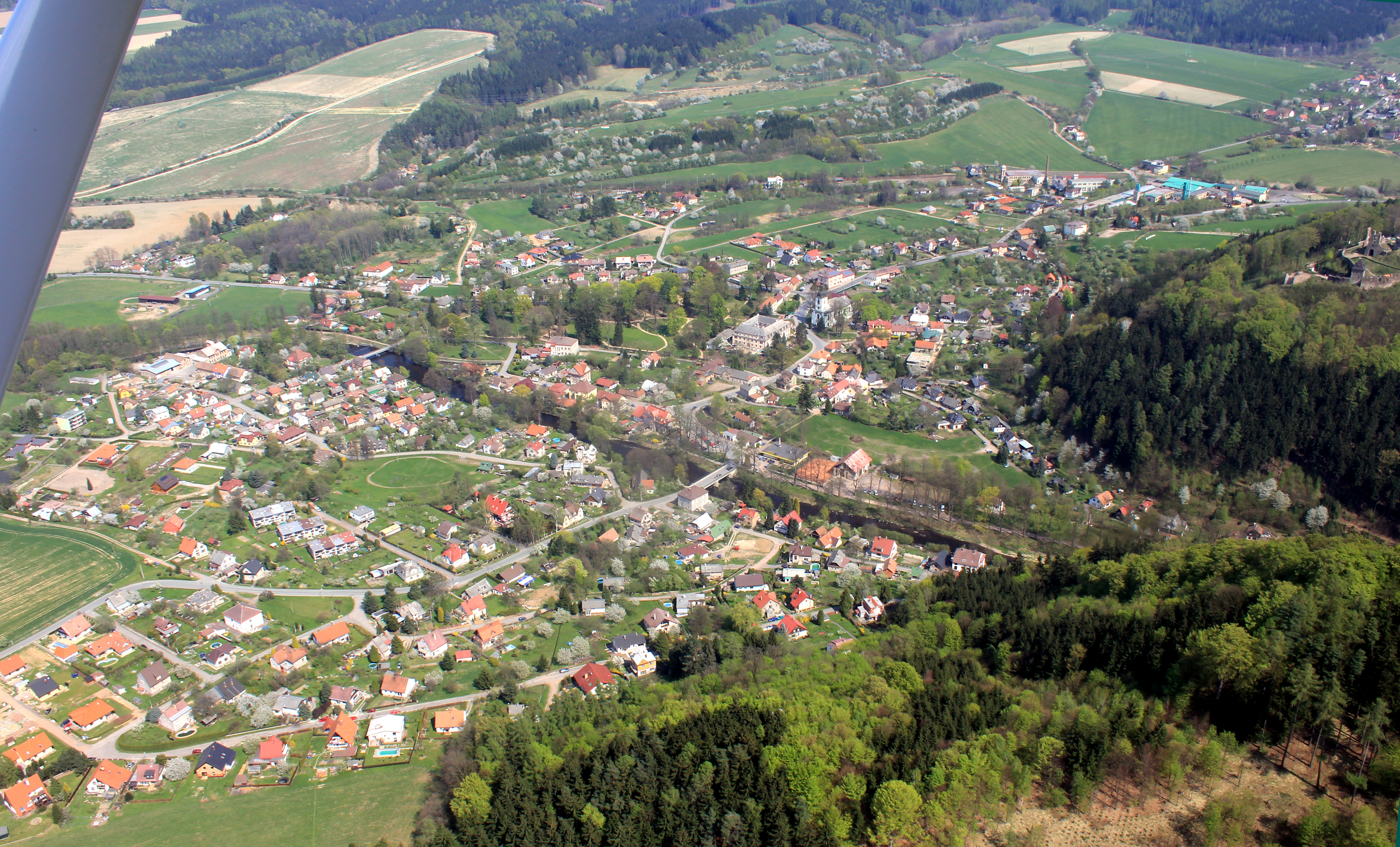
- Aerial view

- Flag Coat of arms

- Location in the Czech Republic
- Coordinates: 50°4′56″N 16°18′32″E
- Country: Czech Republic
- Region: Hradec Králové
- District: Rychnov nad Kněžnou
- First mentioned: 1350

Area
  - Total: 9.03 km^{2} (3.49 sq mi)
- Elevation: 315 m (1,033 ft)

Population (2026-01-01)
  - Total: 971
  - Density: 108/km^{2} (279/sq mi)
- Time zone: UTC+1 (CET)
  - Summer (DST): UTC+2 (CEST)
- Postal code: 517 43
- Website: www.potstejn.cz

Potštejn (German: Pottenstein) is a municipality and village in Rychnov nad Kněžnou District in the Hradec Králové Region of the Czech Republic. It has about 1,000 inhabitants.

== Administrative division ==
Potštejn consists of two municipal parts (in brackets population according to the 2021 census):

- Potštejn (831)
- Brná (143)

== Etymology ==
The name of the municipality was derived from name of castle with the same name, which was named after its founder Půta of Drslavic: Puttenstein, misspelled as Potštejn.

== Geography ==
Potštejn is located about 9 kilometres (6 mi) south of Rychnov nad Kněžnou and 35 km (22 mi) southeast of Hradec Králové. It lies on the border of three geomorphological regions: Orlice Table, Svitavy Uplands and Orlické Foothills. The highest point is at 518 m (1,699 ft) above sea level. The municipality is situated in the valley of the Divoká Orlice River.

== History ==
Lacemakers in Potštejn, between 1890 and 1909, photo by František Krátký

The first written mention of the castle of Potštejn is from 1259, 1287 or 1295. The castle was conquered only once in history, in 1339 by Charles IV before he became king. The village below the castle was first mentioned in 1350. The golden times of the castle were after 1495, when it was bought by Vilém II of Pernštejn, who had rebuilt it.

In the 17th century, economic decline came, the castle fell into disrepair, and the entire Potštejn went bankrupt. In 1746, the estate was bought by the nobleman Jan Ludvík Harbuval Chamaré, who had built here a manor house. After the House of Chamaré died out in the mid-19th century, Potštejn was acquired by marriage by the Dobřenský of Dobřenice family. They owned it until 1945, when their properties were confiscated.

The renewed Unity of the Brethren was founded in Potštejn in 1870.

== Demographics ==
Historical population

| Year | Pop. | ±% |
|---|---|---|
| 1869 | 1,041 | — |
| 1880 | 1,084 | +4.1% |
| 1890 | 1,052 | −3.0% |
| 1900 | 989 | −6.0% |
| 1910 | 970 | −1.9% |

| Year | Pop. | ±% |
|---|---|---|
| 1921 | 916 | −5.6% |
| 1930 | 1,012 | +10.5% |
| 1950 | 1,029 | +1.7% |
| 1961 | 1,107 | +7.6% |
| 1970 | 1,097 | −0.9% |

| Year | Pop. | ±% |
|---|---|---|
| 1980 | 1,041 | −5.1% |
| 1991 | 991 | −4.8% |
| 2001 | 904 | −8.8% |
| 2011 | 896 | −0.9% |
| 2021 | 974 | +8.7% |

Source: Censuses

== Transport ==
Potštejn is located on the railway line Hradec Králové–Letohrad.

== Sights ==
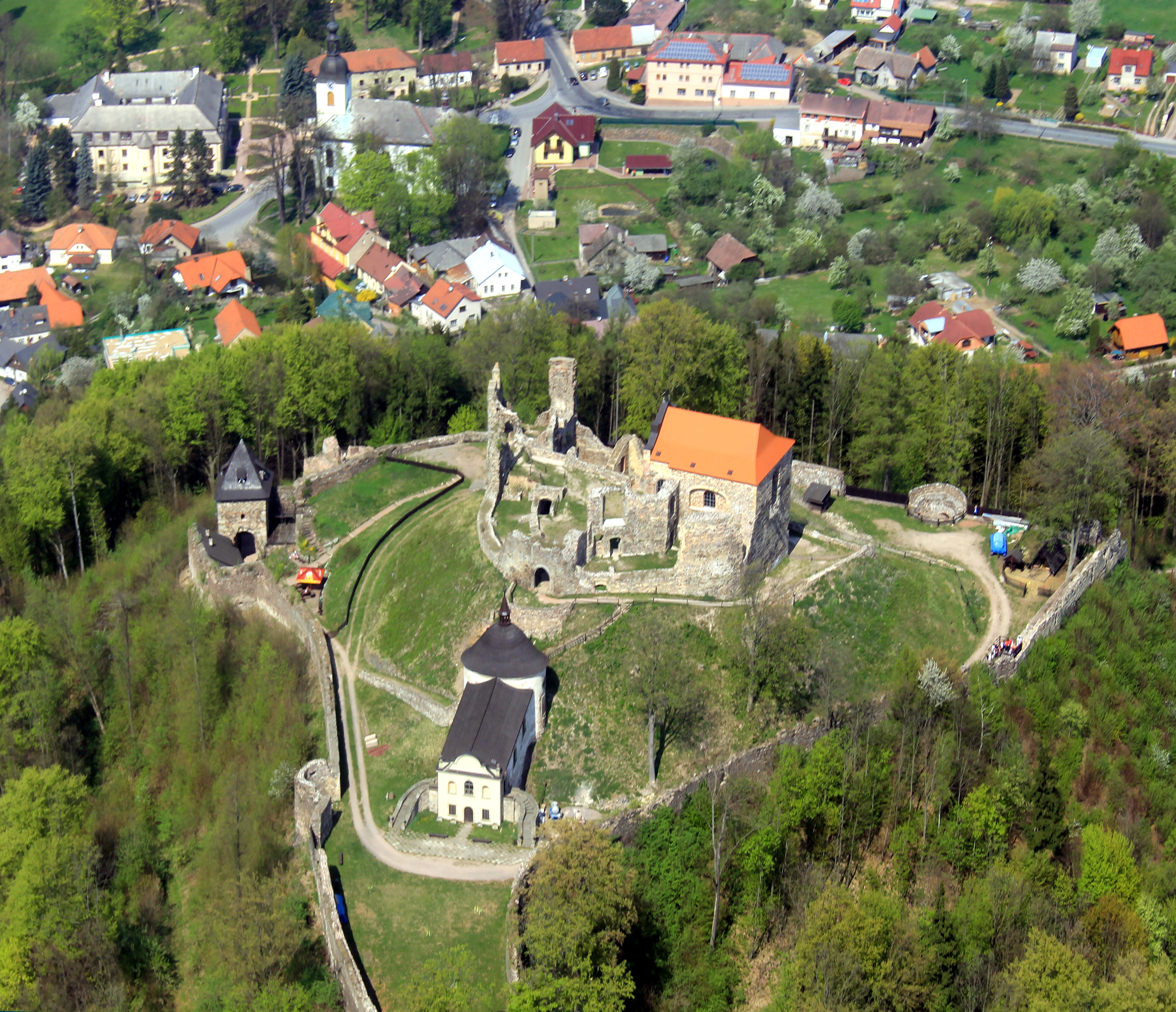
Potštejn Castle above the village

The Potštejn Castle is a castle ruin with an exhibition on the history of the castle. The castle complex includes the Chapel of Saint John of Nepomuk from 1766 and the last station of the Stations of the Cross from 1754.

The Potštejn Manor House is a late Baroque castle, built in 1749–1755. Today it is privately owned, but it is open to the public. There is a castle park next to the castle, which is a combination of a French garden and an English park with rare species of trees.

The Church of Saint Lawrence was built in 1815–1821.

== In literature ==
The Potštejn Castle was famed in Alois Jirásek's novel Poklad.

== Notable people ==
- Rudolf Ropek (born 1970), photographer and orienteer

== Twin towns – sister cities ==
Potštejn is twinned with:

- Pottenstein, Austria
- Pottenstein, Germany
