= Mika Kuisma =

Finnish orienteer

Medal record

Men's orienteering

Representing Finland

World Championships
Bronze medal – third place	1993 West Point	Relay

World Cup
Bronze medal – third place	1994	Overall WC

Mika Kuisma (1967 – 11 January 1995) was a Finnish orienteering competitor. He died in a car crash.

He finished 3rd overall in the Orienteering World Cup in 1994, behind winner Petter Thoresen and Janne Salmi. He finished 25th in the World Cup 1992.

He competed at the 1991 World Orienteering Championships in Mariánské Lázně, where he finished 8th in the short course, and 17th in the classic distance. At the 1993 World Orienteering Championships in West Point, he received a bronze medal in relay with the Finnish team, and finished 19th in the classic distance.

== See also ==
- Finnish orienteers
- List of orienteers
- List of orienteering events
