= Arja Hannus =

Swedish orienteering competitor

Medal record

Women's orienteering

Representing Sweden

World Championships
Gold medal – first place	1981 Thun	Relay
Gold medal – first place	1987 Gérardmer	Individual
Gold medal – first place	1989 Skövde	Relay
Gold medal – first place	1991 Mariánské Lázně	Relay
Silver medal – second place	1987 Gérardmer	Relay

Arja Hannus (born 13 January 1960) is a Swedish orienteering competitor, competing for sports club Selånger SK. She won the 1987 Individual World Orienteering Championships. She is three times Relay World Champion, from 1981, 1989 and 1991, as a member of the Swedish winning teams, and has a silver medal from 1987.
