= Jani Lakanen =

Finnish orienteering competitor

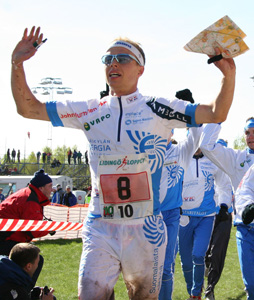

Personal information
- Born: 11 December 1976 (age 49) Lohja, Finland

Sport
- Sport: Orienteering
Medal record
Men's orienteering
Representing Finland
World Championships
Gold medal – first place	2001 Tampere	Relay
Gold medal – first place	2006 Aarhus	Long
Silver medal – second place	1999 Inverness	Relay
Silver medal – second place	2001 Tampere	Classic
Silver medal – second place	2003 Rapperswil-Jona	Relay
Silver medal – second place	2006 Aarhus	Relay
Silver medal – second place	2013 Vuokatti	Long
Bronze medal – third place	2005 Aichi	Sprint
Orienteering World Cup
Gold medal – first place	2000	Overall WC
European Championships
Gold medal – first place	2002 Sümeg	Relay
Gold medal – first place	2006 Otepää	Long
Junior World Championships
Bronze medal – third place	1995 Horsens	Classic
Bronze medal – third place	1996 Govora	Classic

Jani Lakanen (born 11 December 1976 in Lohja) is a Finnish orienteering competitor, winner of the 2006 World Orienteering Championships (Long distance).

He became world champion in relay in 2001, together with Jarkko Huovila, Juha Peltola and Janne Salmi.

He won the overall Orienteering World Cup in 2000.

He received a gold medal in relay at the 2002 European Orienteering Championships in Sümeg, and a gold medal in the long course in 2006 in Otepää.

== See also ==
- Finnish orienteers
- List of orienteers
- List of orienteering events
