= Jana Galíková =

Czech orienteering competitor

Medal record

Women's orienteering

Representing Czechoslovakia

World Championships
| Silver medal – second place | 1983 Zalaegerszeg | Relay |
| Silver medal – second place | 1989 Skövde | Individual |
| Silver medal – second place | 1989 Skövde | Relay |
| Bronze medal – third place | 1987 Gérardmer | Individual |
| Bronze medal – third place | 1987 Gérardmer | Relay |
| Bronze medal – third place | 1991 Mariánské Lázně | Classic |
| Bronze medal – third place | 1991 Mariánské Lázně | Relay |

Jana Galíková (née Hlaváčová; born 22 January 1963 in Brno) is a Czech orienteering competitor who competed for Czechoslovakia. She received two silver medals and four bronze medals at the 1987, 1989 and 1991 World Orienteering Championships.
