= Annika Viilo =

Finnish orienteer

Medal record

Women's orienteering

Representing Finland

World Championships
Gold medal – first place	1995 Detmold	Relay
Silver medal – second place	1993 West Point	Classic distance
Silver medal – second place	1993 West Point	Relay
Bronze medal – third place	1989 Skaraborg	Relay

Annika Viilo (born 12 November 1965) is a Finnish orienteering competitor and world champion. She won a gold medal at the 1995 World Orienteering Championships in Detmold with the Finnish relay team. She received a silver medal on the Classic distance at the 1993 World Championships in West Point, and also a silver medal with the relay team, and she received a bronze medal with the relay team in 1989 (Skaraborg).

After retiring, Viilo has been working as a middle school teacher, teaching health education and P.E.

In 2016 she won a gold medal at the World Masters Orienteering Championships in Estonia on long distance in W50 category.

== See also ==
- Finnish orienteers
- List of orienteers
- List of orienteering events
