= Jimmy Birklin =

Swedish orienteering competitor

Medal record

Men's orienteering

Representing Sweden

World Championships
Gold medal – first place	2001 Tampere	Sprint
Bronze medal – third place	1995 Detmold	Relay
Bronze medal – third place	1999 Inverness	Relay

Junior World Championships
Silver medal – second place	1990 Älvsbyn	Long
Silver medal – second place	1990 Älvsbyn	Relay

Jimmy Birklin (born 12 January 1970) is a Swedish orienteering competitor, winner of the 2001 Sprint World Orienteering Championships.

He was also part of the Swedish team that obtained bronze medal both in the 1995 and 1999 Relay World Championships.
