= Marita Skogum =

Swedish orienteering competitor (born 1961)

Medal record

Women's orienteering

Representing Sweden

World Championships
Gold medal – first place	1983 Zalaegerszeg	Relay
Gold medal – first place	1989 Skövde	Individual
Gold medal – first place	1989 Skövde	Relay
Gold medal – first place	1991 Marianske Lazne	Relay
Gold medal – first place	1993 West Point	Classic
Gold medal – first place	1993 West Point	Relay
Silver medal – second place	1983 Zalaegerszeg	Individual
Silver medal – second place	1987 Gérardmer	Relay
Silver medal – second place	1993 West Point	Short
Bronze medal – third place	1991 Marianske Lazne	Short

World Cup
Gold medal – first place	1992	WC Overall

Marita Skogum (born 3 January 1961) is a Swedish orienteering competitor. She won the 1989 Individual World Orienteering Championships, as well as the 1993 Classic distance. She also obtained silver in the Individual course in 1983, and silver in the Short distance in 1993. She is four times Relay World Champion, from 1983, 1989, 1991 and 1993, as a member of the Swedish winning teams, and has a silver medal from 1987.

Skogum has been coach for the Swedish Women's National Team from 2001, and was nominated for "Swedish Trainer of the Year 2004". She has been coach for the Men's National Team from 2006.
