= Håkan Eriksson (orienteer) =

Swedish orienteering competitor

Personal information
- Nationality: Swedish
- Born: 20 August 1961 (age 64)

Sport
- Sport: Orienteering
Medal record
Men's orienteering
Representing Sweden
World Championships
Silver medal – second place	1989 Skövde	Relay
Silver medal – second place	2004 Västerås	Sprint
Bronze medal – third place	1999 Inverness	Relay

Håkan Eriksson (born 20 August 1961) is a Swedish orienteering competitor. He received a silver medal in the relay at the 1989 World Orienteering Championships in Skövde, and received a bronze medal in 1999. He received a silver medal in the sprint event at the World Orienteering Championships in 2004.

Eriksson won the Swedish 5-days event O-Ringen in 1983, and again in 1991.

Eriksson won his age group at the 2024 Bolder Boulder 10K in Boulder, Colorado with a time of 37:35 at age 62.
