= Ada Kuchařová =

Czech orienteer (born 1958)

Medal record

Women's orienteering

Representing Czechoslovakia

World Championships
Silver medal – second place	1983 Zalaegerszeg	Relay
Silver medal – second place	1989 Skövde	Relay
Silver medal – second place	1991 Mariánské Lázně	Short distance
Bronze medal – third place	1987 Gérardmer	Relay
Bronze medal – third place	1991 Mariánské Lázně	Relay

Ada Kuchařová (born 5 January 1958 in Brno) is a Czech orienteering competitor. She received three silver medals and two bronze medals at the 1983, 1987, 1989 and 1991 World Orienteering Championships.

Kuchařová most recently competed in an event counting towards International Orienteering Federation rankings in September 2001.

== World cup ==
At the Orienteering World Cup, Kuchařová finished overall 9th in 1986, 11th in 1988, and 11th in 1990.
