= Anna Bogren =

Swedish orienteering competitor

Medal record

Women's orienteering

Representing Sweden

World Championships
Gold medal – first place	1993 Harriman	Short
Gold medal – first place	1993 Harriman	Relay
Gold medal – first place	1997 Grimstad	Relay
Silver medal – second place	1995 Detmold	Relay
Bronze medal – third place	1995 Detmold	Short

Anna Bogren (born 3 February 1965) is a Swedish orienteering competitor. She won the 1993 Short distance World Orienteering Championships, and finished third in 1995. She is two times Relay World Champion, from 1993 and 1997, and has a silver medal from 1995, as member of the Swedish winning teams.
