= Markku Salminen =

Finnish orienteer (1946–2004)

Personal information
- Born: 9 September 1946 Kokkola, Finland
- Died: 6 January 2004 (aged 57)

Sport
- Sport: Orienteering; Long-distance running
Medal record
Men's orienteering
Representing Finland
World Championships
Silver medal – second place	1968 Linköping	Relay
Silver medal – second place	1974 Silkeborg	Relay
Bronze medal – third place	1976 Aviemore	Relay

Markku Salminen (9 September 1946 – 6 January 2004) was a Finnish orienteering competitor. He received a silver medal in the relay event and finished 13th in the individual event at the 1968 World Orienteering Championships in Linköping. In 1970 he finished 4th with the Finnish relay team. In 1974 he finished 16th in the individual event, and received a silver medal in the relay with the Finnish team. In 1976 he finished 5th in the individual event, and received a bronze in the relay. Salminen won the 1970 and 1978 Jukola relay.

== See also ==
- Finnish orienteers
- List of orienteers
- List of orienteering events
