= Johan Ivarsson (orienteer) =

Swedish orienteering competitor

Medal record

Men's orienteering

Representing Sweden

World Championships
| Bronze medal – third place | 1995 Detmold | Relay |
| Bronze medal – third place | 1999 Inverness | Relay |

World Cup
| Gold medal – first place | 1996 | WC Overall |
| Silver medal – second place | 1998 | WC Overall |

Johan Ivarsson (born 16 March 1967) is a Swedish orienteering competitor. He won the overall world cup in 1996.

== World championships ==
He participated at the 1995 World Orienteering Championships in Detmold, where he received a bronze medal in the relay event with the Swedish team. He received a bronze medal as part of the Swedish team in the relay also at the 1999 World Championships in Inverness.

== World cup ==
Ivarsson finished first overall in the 1996 Orienteering World Cup, and second in 1998, behind Chris Terkelsen.

== Club orienteering ==
Ivarsson won the Jukola relay in 1992, 1999 and 2002.
