= Hannu Mäkirinta =

Finnish orienteer (1949–1989)

Personal information
- Nationality: Finnish
- Born: 30 April 1949
- Died: 17 February 1989 (aged 39)

Sport
- Sport: Orienteering
Medal record
Men's orienteering
Representing Finland
World Championships
Silver medal – second place	1974 Silkeborg	Relay
Bronze medal – third place	1976 Aviemore	Relay

Hannu Mäkirinta (30 April 1949 – 17 February 1989) was a Finnish orienteering competitor. At the 1974 World Orienteering Championships in Silkeborg he finished 16th in the individual event, and received a silver medal in the relay with the Finnish team. In 1976 he finished 15th in the individual event, and received a bronze in the relay. He won the 1975 Jukola relay.

== See also ==
- Finnish orienteers
- List of orienteers
- List of orienteering events
