= Kent Olsson (orienteer) =

Swedish orienteer

Medal record

Men's orienteering

Representing Sweden

World Championships
Gold medal – first place	1987 Gérardmer	Individual
Silver medal – second place	1989 Skaraborg	Individual
Silver medal – second place	1989 Skaraborg	Relay
Silver medal – second place	1991 Marianske Lazne	Classic
Silver medal – second place	1991 Marianske Lazne	Short
Bronze medal – third place	1983 Zalaegerszeg	Relay
Bronze medal – third place	1987 Gérardmer	Relay

Kent Olsson (born 16 November 1958) is a Swedish orienteering competitor, and winner of the 1987 Individual World Orienteering Championships. He also won silver medals in 1989 and 1991, as well as silver medal on the Short distance in 1991. He was part of the Swedish team that won bronze medals in 1983 and 1987, and silver medal in 1989 (World Championships, Relay).

Olsson was elected "Årets orienterare" by Swedish sports journalists in 1982, 1986 and 1987.
