= Jana Cieslarová =

Czech orienteering competitor

Medal record

Women's orienteering

World Championships

Representing Czechoslovakia
Gold medal – first place	1991 Mariánské Lázně	Short
Silver medal – second place	1989 Skövde	Relay
Bronze medal – third place	1991 Aarhus	Relay

Representing Czech Republic
Bronze medal – third place	1993 West Point	Relay
Bronze medal – third place	1995 Detmold	Relay

Jana Cieslarová (born 6 June 1971 in Třinec) is a Czech orienteering competitor who competed for Czechoslovakia until 1992. She won the 1991 Short distance World Orienteering Championships. She also has a silver medal in the Relay championship from 1989, and bronze medals from 1991, 1993 and 1995.
