= Thomas Bührer =

Swiss orienteering competitor

Personal information
- Nationality: Swiss
- Born: 30 January 1968 (age 58)

Sport
- Sport: Orienteering
Medal record
Men's orienteering
Representing Switzerland
World Championships
Gold medal – first place	1991 Mariánské Lázně	Relay
Gold medal – first place	1993 West Point	Relay
Gold medal – first place	1995 Detmold	Relay
Gold medal – first place	2003 Rapperswil-Jona	Long
European Championships
Gold medal – first place	2000 Truskavets	Relay
Gold medal – first place	2002 Sümeg	Long

Thomas Bührer (born 30 January 1968) is a Swiss orienteering competitor, winner of the 2003 World Orienteering Championships, Long distance. He is also three times Relay world champion, as a member of the Swiss winning teams in 1991, 1993 and 1995.
