= Alain Berger (orienteer) =

Swiss orienteering competitor (born 1970)

Medal record

Men's orienteering

Representing Switzerland

World Championships
Gold medal – first place	1991 Mariánské Lázně	Relay
Gold medal – first place	1995 Detmold	Relay
Bronze medal – third place	1999 Inverness	Classic

Alain Berger (born 13 January 1970) is a Swiss orienteering competitor. He is two times Relay World Champion, as a member of the Swiss winning teams in 1991 and 1995. He also obtained bronze on the Classic distance in the 1999 World Championship. He won the 1999 Jukola relay.
