= Reijo Mattinen =

Finnish orienteer

Medal record

Men's orienteering

Representing Finland

World Championships
Silver medal – second place	1995 Detmold	Relay
Bronze medal – third place	1989 Skövde	Relay
Bronze medal – third place	1991 Mariánské Lázně	Relay

Reijo Mattinen (born 1963) is a Finnish orienteering competitor, three times medalist in the relay at the World Orienteering Championships.

He received a bronze medal in the relay event in 1989, a bronze medal in 1991, and a silver medal in 1995.

== See also ==
- Finnish orienteers
- List of orienteers
- List of orienteering events
