= Petter Thoresen (orienteer) =

Norwegian orienteer

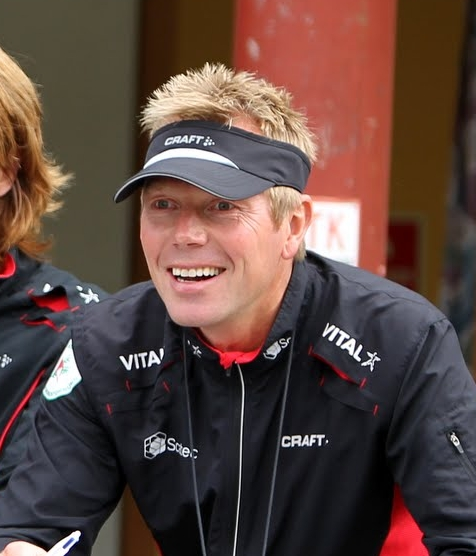

Personal information
- Born: 10 March 1966 (age 60)
- Relative: Ingrid Hadler (aunt)

Sport
- Sport: Orienteering; Ski orienteering
- Club: Halden SK
Medal record
Men's orienteering
Representing Norway
World Championships
Gold medal – first place	1989 Skövde	Individual
Gold medal – first place	1989 Skövde	Relay
Gold medal – first place	1993 Harriman	Short
Gold medal – first place	1997 Grimstad	Classic
Gold medal – first place	1999 Inverness	Relay
Silver medal – second place	1991 Mariánské Lázně	Relay
Bronze medal – third place	1993 Harriman	Classic
Bronze medal – third place	1997 Grimstad	Relay

Petter Thoresen (born 10 March 1966) is a Norwegian orienteering competitor, winner of the 1989 Individual World Orienteering Championships, the Short distance in 1993, and the Classic distance in 1997. He also has a bronze medal on the Classic distance from 1993.

Thoresen is two times Relay World Champion, from 1989 and 1999, as well as having a silver medal from 1991 and a bronze medal from 1997.

He represented Bækkelagets SK and Halden SK. He won the Jukola relay 5 times between 1988 and 2003, first with Bækkelaget in 1988, and then with Halden SK in 1993, 1997, 1998 and 2003.

== Coaching career ==
Thoresen was coach for the French national orienteering team from 2004 to 2008, and head coach for the Norwegian national team from 2008 to 2013.
