= Stefan Bolliger =

Swiss orienteering competitor

Medal record

Men's orienteering

Representing Switzerland

World Championships
Silver medal – second place	1987 Gérardmer	Relay

Stefan Bolliger is a Swiss orienteering competitor. He participated in the 1987 World Orienteering Championships in Gérardmer, where he placed fifth in the individual course, and won a silver medal in the relay. He competed at the 1989 World Championships in Skövde, where he placed fifth in the relay with the Swiss team.
