= Christian Aebersold =

Swiss orienteering competitor (born 1962)

Medal record

Men's orienteering

Representing Switzerland

World Championships
Gold medal – first place	1991 Mariánské Lázně	Relay
Gold medal – first place	1993 West Point	Relay
Gold medal – first place	1995 Detmold	Relay

Christian Aebersold (born 22 February 1962) is a Swiss orienteering competitor. He is three times Relay World Champion, as a member of the Swiss winning teams in 1991, 1993 and 1995. He is also a four time Swiss champion over the long distance (1986 to 1988, and 1990).

Aebersold is the father of Simona Aebersold.
