= Janne Salmi =

Finnish orienteer

Personal information
- Nationality: Finnish
- Born: 17 April 1969 (age 57)
- Spouse: Vroni König-Salmi

Sport
- Sport: Orienteering
- Club: Turun Suunnistajat
Medal record
Men's orienteering
Representing Finland
World Championships
| Gold medal – first place | 1997 Grimstad | Short |
| Gold medal – first place | 2001 Tampere | Relay |
| Silver medal – second place | 1995 Detmold | Classic |
| Silver medal – second place | 1995 Detmold | Relay |
| Silver medal – second place | 1997 Grimstad | Relay |
| Silver medal – second place | 1999 Inverness | Relay |
| Bronze medal – third place | 1999 Inverness | Short |

Janne Juhani Salmi (born 17 April 1969) is a Finnish orienteering competitor and world champion. He won the short distance at the 1997 World Orienteering Championships, and a gold medal in the relay at the 2001 World Orienteering Championships. He won a total of three individual world championship medals and four relay medals, and won the Jukola relay three times with the club Turun Suunnistajat.

After his active career Salmi coached the Finnish national orienteering team between 2005 and 2010, and since 2020 he has been head coach for the Norwegian national team.

== Sports career ==
Salmi won a silver medal in the classic distance at the 1995 World Orienteering Championships, behind winner Jörgen Mårtensson. He was part of the Finnish relay team which won silver medals, and placed eleventh in the short distance. He won a gold medal in the short distance at the 1997 World Orienteering Championships in Grimstad, as well as a second WOC silver medal in the relay. He had one race victory, winning the short distance in Slovakia, and placed ninth overall in the 1998 Orienteering World Cup. At the 1999 World Orienteering Championships he won a bronze medal in the short distance, and his third WOC silver medal in the relay. At the 2001 World Orienteering Championships in Tampere he placed sixth in the long distance, and won a gold medal with the Finnish relay team. He won a bronze medal in the long distance at the 2001 Open Nordic Orieneering Championships (NOC) in Finland. He also won a bronze medal in the middle distance at the 2003 NOC in Sweden. He placed ninth in the middle distance at the 2003 World Orienteering Championships. Married to Swiss orienteer Vroni König-Salmi. Salmi won the Jukola relay in 1994, 1996 and 2001 with his club Turun Suunnistajat.

== Coaching career ==
Salmi coached the Finnish national team from 2005 to 2010. He also worked some years as sports and development manager at a sports academy in Turku. He was assigned head coach for the Norwegian national orienteering team in 2020, succeeding Jørgen Rostrup. In 2023 he extended his coaching engagement for three more years, until 2026.

== See also ==
- Finnish orienteers
- List of orienteers
- List of orienteering events
