= Timo Karppinen =

Finnish orienteering competitor

Personal information
- Nationality: Finnish
- Born: 26 December 1967 (age 58)
Medal record
Men's orienteering
Representing Finland
World Championships
Silver medal – second place	1993 West Point	Short distance
Silver medal – second place	1995 Detmold	Relay
Silver medal – second place	1997 Grimstad	Short distance
Silver medal – second place	1997 Grimstad	Relay
Bronze medal – third place	1993 West Point	Relay

Timo Karppinen (born 26 December 1967) is a Finnish orienteering competitor. He received five medals in the World Orienteering Championships between 1993 and 1997.

== See also ==
- Finnish orienteers
- List of orienteers
- List of orienteering events
