= Urs Flühmann =

Swiss orienteering competitor (born 1962)

Medal record

Men's orienteering

Representing Switzerland

World Championships
Gold medal – first place	1991 Mariánské Lázně	Relay
Gold medal – first place	1993 West Point	Relay
Silver medal – second place	1987 Gérardmer	Relay
Bronze medal – third place	1985 Bendigo	Relay
Bronze medal – third place	1987 Gérardmer	Individual

Urs Flühmann (born 1962) is a Swiss orienteering competitor. He is two times Relay World Champion, as a member of the Swiss winning teams in 1991 and 1993, as well as having a silver medal from 1987 and a bronze medal from 1985. He also obtained bronze in the Individual World Championship in 1987.
