= Jörgen Mårtensson =

Swedish orienteer (born 1959)

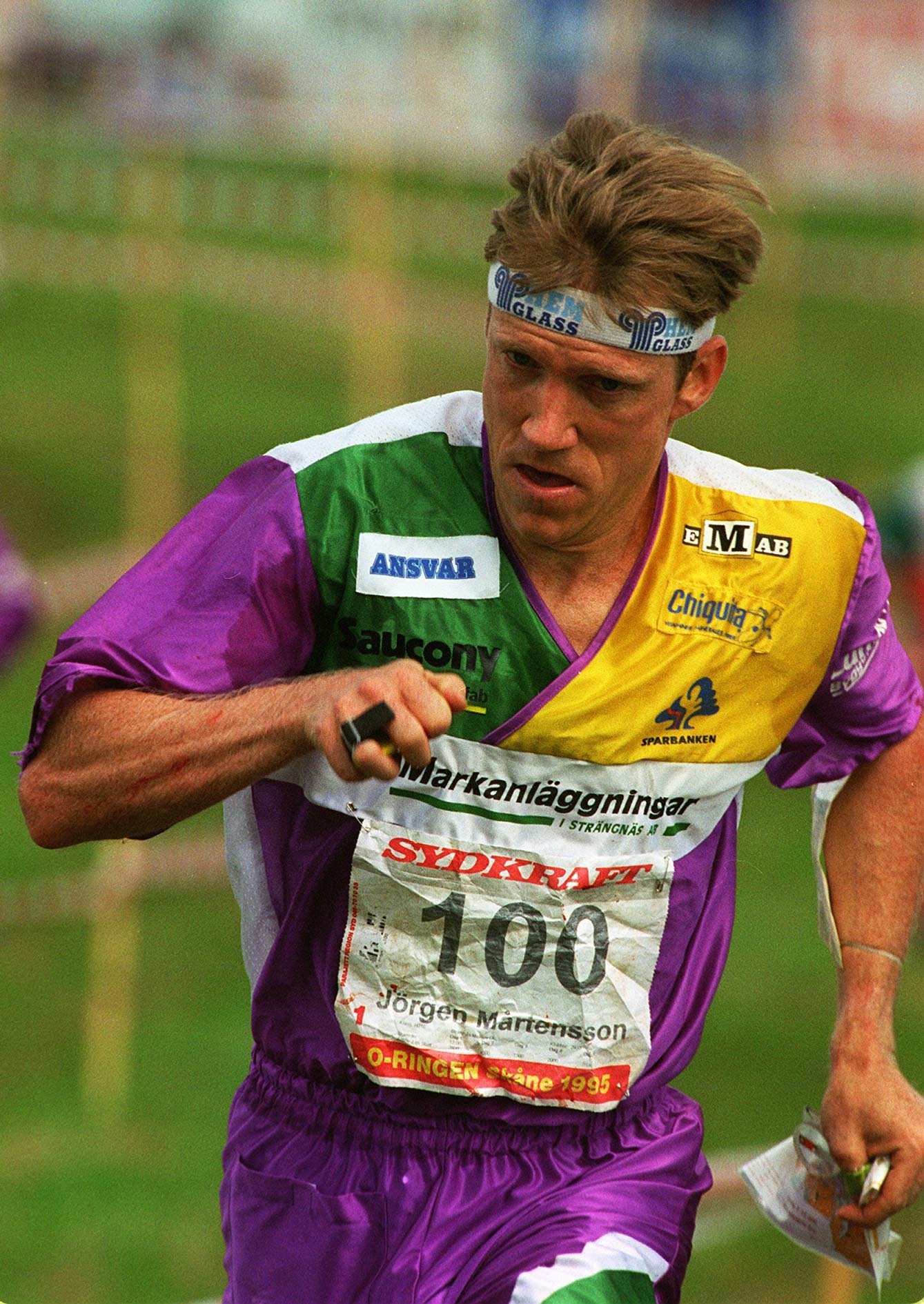
- Mårtensson at O-Ringen 1995

Medal record

Men's orienteering

Representing Sweden

World Championships
Gold medal – first place	1991 Mariánské Lázně	Classic
Gold medal – first place	1995 Detmold	Classic
Silver medal – second place	1981 Thun	Relay
Silver medal – second place	1985 Bendigo	Relay
Silver medal – second place	1989 Skövde	Relay
Silver medal – second place	1993 Harriman	Classic
Silver medal – second place	1995 Detmold	Short
Silver medal – second place	1997 Grimstad	Classic
Bronze medal – third place	1987 Gérardmer	Relay
Bronze medal – third place	1995 Detmold	Relay

Jörgen Mårtensson (born 4 December 1959) is a Swedish orienteer. He is one of the most successful Swedish orienteers of all times.

Twice a winner of the World Orienteering Championships, he also won the 5 days O-Ringen in 1981 (at age 21), 1996 and 1997 (at age 37). Furthermore, he won the Swedish Championship in Marathon at Stockholm Marathon in 1993. Now retired, he had one of the longest spanning careers in orienteering at world class level, taking part in World Championships over a period of twenty years. Starting with the 1978 World Orienteering Championships, where he placed eighth in the individual contest, he competed in every world championship until 1997. He won the Jukola relay in 1981, 1984 and 1985.

== Results ==
World Orienteering Championships

- Gold medals (2)
  - 1991 – long distance – Mariánské Lázně, Czechoslovakia
  - 1995 – long distance – Detmold, Germany
- Silver medals (5)
  - 1981 – relay – Thun, Switzerland
  - 1985 – relay – Bendigo, Australia
  - 1989 – relay – Skaraborg, Sweden
  - 1993 – long distance – West Point, US
  - 1995 – short distance – Detmold, Germany
  - 1997 – long distance – Grimstad, Norway
- Bronze medals (2)
  - 1987 – relay – Gérardmer, France
  - 1995 – relay – Detmold, Germany
