= List of orienteering events =

This is a list of all orienteers events found in Wikipedia and which are notable within the orienteering sport.

== Foot Orienteering Championships ==
=== World Championships ===
- World Orienteering Championships
- Junior World Orienteering Championships
- World Masters Orienteering Championships
- World University Orienteering Championships

=== Regional Championships ===
- European Orienteering Championships
- Asian Orienteering Championships

== Foot Orienteering, open to everyone ==
Non-exhaustive list of foot orienteering events that are open to everyone:

- O-Ringen, The largest five-day event in Sweden. In 2022 more than 20,000 orienteers participate
- Jukola Relay, held annually in Finland since 1949 where more than 18,000 orienteers participate
- Kainuu Orienteering Week, held annually in Finland with four races and ca. 4000 orienteers participate.
- Jan Kjellström International Festival of Orienteering
- The Scottish Six Days Orienteering Event, held biennially in Scotland since 1977, with typically 3,500 individual competitors
- Tiomila, a night relay competition in Sweden with 10 legs, attracting 350 teams
- 25-Manna, a relay race in Sweden where each team has 25 legs for different ages and gender, held since 1974 where about 350 teams participate
- TICBCN - Trofeu Internacional Ciutat de Barcelona Two days orienteering event in a pretty city.
- Troféu de Orientação do Minho 2015, orienteering event in Portugal with three races and a Long World Ranking Event (WRE)

== Ski Orienteering Championships ==
- World Ski Orienteering Championships
- World Cup in Ski Orienteering
- Junior World Ski Orienteering Championships

== Mountain bike orienteering Championships ==
- World MTB Orienteering Championships

== Trail orienteering championships ==
- World Trail Orienteering Championships
- European Trail Orienteering Championships
- European Cup in Trail Orienteering

== Mountain marathon events ==
- Lowe Alpine Mountain Marathon
- Original Mountain Marathon
- Saunders Lakeland Mountain Marathon
- The Highlander Mountain Marathon
- The Capricorn Mountain Marathon

== See also ==
- Orienteering
- List of orienteers
- List of orienteering clubs
- Orienteers category
- Orienteering clubs category
- Orienteering competitions category
