= World Orienteering Championships =

Recurring international orienteering competitions

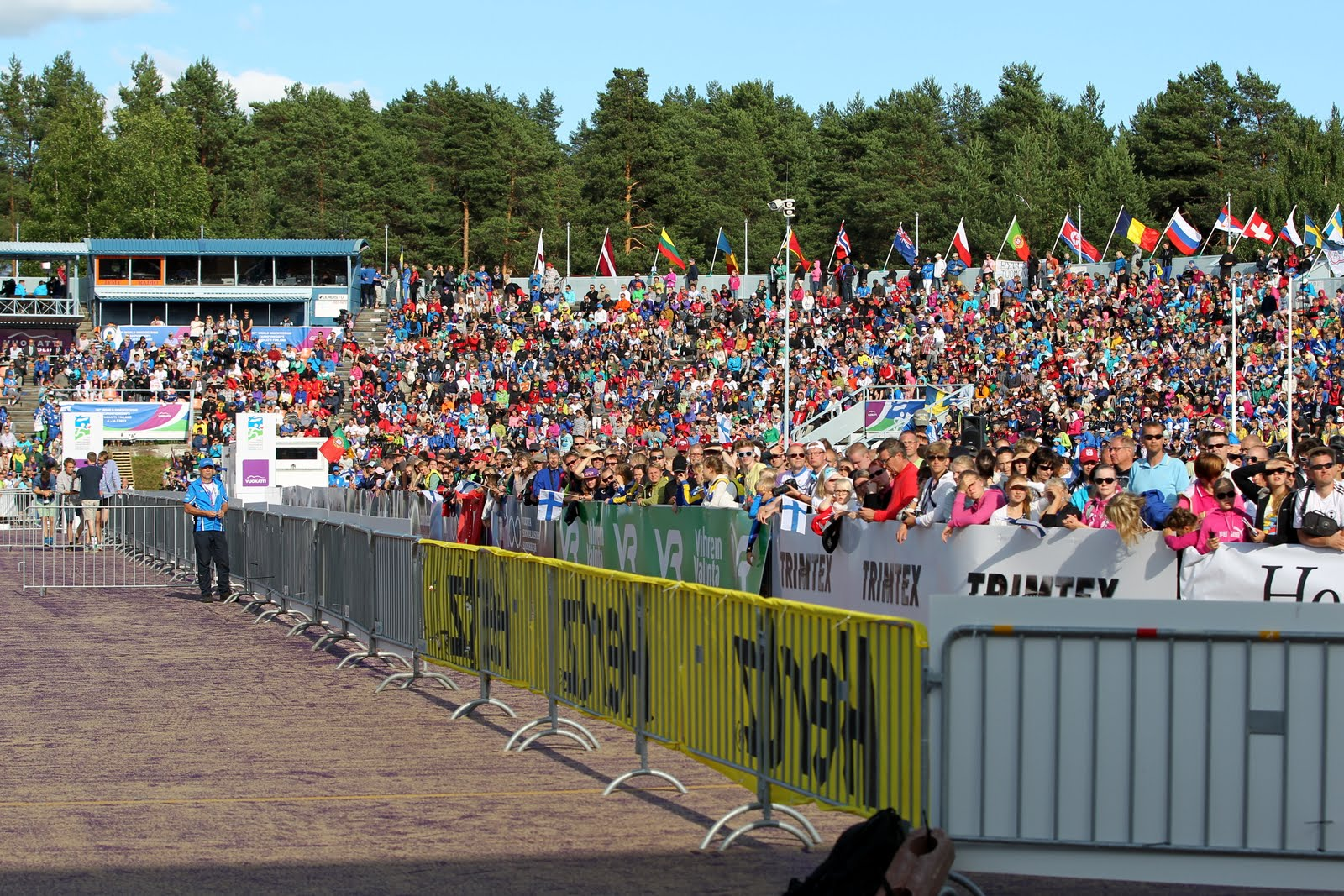
- Sprint event at WOC 2013 in Vuokatti, Finland
- Status: active
- Genre: sporting event
- Date: July–August
- Frequency: annual
- Location: various
- Inaugurated: 1966
- Previous event: 2025
- Next event: 2026
- Organiser: IOF

The World Orienteering Championships (often abbreviated as WOC) is an international orienteering competition which has been organized by the International Orienteering Federation (IOF) since 1966. The World Orienteering Championships is considered to be the most prestigious competition in competitive orienteering. The races are contested between members of the IOF, which are each aligned to a National Olympic Committee.

The first world championships in orienteering was held in Fiskars, Finland from 1–2 October 1966, with two medal events being contested. The championships were held biennially up to 2003, with the exception of the 1978 and 1979 editions. From 2003 to 2021, all medal competitions were held annually, before an alternating biennial system between two different championship formats was implemented starting at the 2022 World Orienteering Championships.

In 1966, there were only two medal events, with one individual event and one team relay event. The world championships now include medal events for six formats, including four individual medal events and two team medal events.

== History ==
=== First championships, 1961–1966 ===
The IOF was founded on 21 May 1961 at a Congress held in Copenhagen, Denmark by the orienteering national federations of Bulgaria, Czechoslovakia, Denmark, the Federal Republic of Germany, the German Democratic Republic, Finland, Hungary, Norway, Sweden and Switzerland. This led to the first official international orienteering competition under the IOF, the 1962 European Orienteering Championships in Løten, Norway. The competition consisted only of an individual race, but two years later at the 1964 European Championships (held in Le Brassus, Switzerland), a relay event was added to the competition program. These two European championships became the template for the first World Orienteering Championships in 1966.

11 different nations participated in the 1966 World Orienteering Championships, all of them from Europe, including all founding members of the IOF except for West Germany along with teams from Great Britain and Austria. The gold medal for the men's individual race went to Åge Hadler from Norway, and the women's winner was Ulla Lindkvist from Sweden.

=== Early championships, 1967–1990 ===
At the 1968 World Orienteering Championships, Swedish Television (SVT) broadcast the individual competition live, which was the first TV broadcast of orienteering in Sweden and worldwide. The first ever competitor at the World Championships from outside of Europe was Robert Kaill from Canada, who participated at the 1970 World Orienteering Championships but was unable to complete the course.

In 1972, Sarolta Monspart from Hungary became the first person from outside of the Nordic countries to win a gold medal at the World Championships or the European Championships. In 1985, the championships were held outside of Europe for the first time, with the races being hosted by Australia; the championships have only been hosted outside of Europe three times, those times being Australia in 1985, the United States in 1993 and Japan in 2005.

Annichen Kringstad from Sweden set a record of winning six gold medals in a row at the championships from 1981 to 1985, winning all available gold medals in that time and being awarded the Svenska Dagbladet Gold Medal in 1981. This record would hold until it was broken by fellow Swede Tove Alexandersson, who won eleven gold medals in a row and was the second orienteer to win the Svenska Dagbladet award. In the men's class, Norway's Øyvin Thon won seven gold medals from 1979 to 1989, and remains one of the most accomplished orienteers by number of gold medals at the championships despite the increase in number of available medals since his retirement.

=== Addition of middle and sprint distances, 1991–2002 ===
In 1991, a short-distance race (roughly 20–25 minutes) was added. 1991 also saw the first gold medal for Switzerland at the world championships, as the relay team of Thomas Bührer, Alain Berger, Urs Flühmann and Christian Aebersold won ahead of Norway and Finland. Switzerland has since become the third most successful nation by number of gold medals, behind only Sweden and Norway.

A sprint race (roughly 12–18 minutes) was added in 2001, with a focus on urban and park areas rather than navigation over rough terrain. Sprint orienteering has since become a popular discipline, with several derivatives being added to the championships since the introduction of the sprint, and many differences between sprint orienteering and forest orienteering, including different mapping standards and different footwear and clothing requirements.

=== Annual championships, 2003–2018 ===
A range of format changes commenced in 2003, with the championships becoming an annual competition. The middle distance (roughly 30–35 minutes) replaced the short distance, and the number of relay legs was decreased from four to three. With the format changes, the number of medal events for both genders more than doubled from three per year in 1999 to eight per year in 2003.

The period from 2003 onwards was dominated by Simone Niggli-Luder from Switzerland in women's orienteering and Thierry Gueorgiou from France in men's orienteering, and the two remain the most decorated orienteers for each gender. Gueorgiou has contributed to all 14 of France's gold medals at the World Championships, while Niggli-Luder remains the most decorated orienteer from either gender with 23 gold medals. Niggli-Luder won her first gold medal in 2001 and retired in 2013, while Gueorgiou won his first medal in 2003 and retired in 2017.

In 2006, Hanny Allston from Australia became the first person from outside of Europe to win a gold medal in the world championships, and the first orienteer to win a gold medal in both the World Orienteering Championships and Junior World Orienteering Championships in the same year.

In 2014, a sprint relay was added with two men and two women participating and with starting order woman-man-man-woman.

=== Alternating biennial system, 2019– ===
In 2019, the World Orienteering Championships was split into two events: Sprint WOC (even-numbered years) consisting of sprint events only, and Forest WOC (odd-numbered years) consisting of forest events only.

Due to the COVID-19 pandemic the first Sprint WOC in 2020 was cancelled. Instead, the sprint and sprint relay disciplines were added to the championships program in 2021, as without this alteration there would not have been sprint competitions in the world championships for four years (2018–2022).

In 2018, Tove Alexandersson from Sweden started a winning streak in the world championships that lasted until 2022. During this time, Alexandersson won a record eleven gold medals in a row, and won all five gold medals available at the 2021 World Orienteering Championships, which remains the record for the number of gold medals won in a single year.

In 2022 the first sprint only WOC was organized in Denmark, and the new competition format Knockout Sprint made its debut.

In 2023, Daniel Hubmann from Switzerland set a record as the oldest orienteer to win a gold medal at the World Championships, at the age of 40 years and 61 days.

== Format ==
The competition format has changed several times. From the beginning in 1966, the World Championships consisted of only two competitions: an individual race and a relay. In 1991, a short-distance race (roughly 20–25 minutes) was added and a sprint race was added in 2001. The middle distance (roughly 30–35 minutes) replaced the short distance in 2003. On IOF's 23rd congress in Lausanne in 2012, it was decided that a sprint relay event would be added in the 2014 World Championships in Italy. The sprint relay is competed in urban areas and consists of four-orienteer mixed-gender teams with starting order woman-man-man-woman. A knock-out sprint format was added in 2022.

=== Current competition format ===
The current championship events are:

Forest WOC (odd years)
Distance	Target Time	Notes
Long distance	90 min	Previously called classic distance
Middle distance	30–35 min	Replaced short distance (20–25 min) in 2003
Relay	3 × 40 min	Three-person teams

Sprint WOC (even years)
Distance	Target Time	Notes
Sprint	12–15 min	
Knock-out sprint	5–8 min	First held in 2022
Sprint relay	4 × 12–15 min	Four-person teams, two men and two women.

== Editions ==
- 1966–2003: Biennial (1–21) except 1978 and 1979
- 2004–Ongoing: Annual (22–Ongoing)
- 2020: Not Held

#	Year	Dates	Location	Events
Biennial
1	1966	1–2 October	Fiskars, Finland	4
2	1968	28–29 September	Linköping, Sweden	4
3	1970	27–29 September	Friedrichroda, East Germany	4
4	1972	14–16 September	Staré Splavy, Czechoslovakia	4
5	1974	20–22 September	Viborg, Denmark	4
6	1976	24–26 September	Aviemore, United Kingdom	4
7	1978	15–17 September	Kongsberg, Norway	4
8	1979	2–4 September	Tampere, Finland	4
9	1981	4–6 September	Thun, Switzerland	4
10	1983	1–4 September	Zalaegerszeg, Hungary	4
11	1985	4–6 September	Bendigo, Australia	4
12	1987	3–5 September	Gérardmer, France	4
13	1989	17–20 August	Skövde, Sweden	4
14	1991	21–25 August	Mariánské Lázně, Czechoslovakia	6
15	1993	9–14 October	West Point, United States	6
16	1995	15–20 August	Detmold, Germany	6
17	1997	11–16 August	Grimstad, Norway	6
18	1999	1–8 August	Inverness, United Kingdom	6
20	2001	29 July – 4 August	Tampere, Finland	8
21	2003	3–9 August	Rapperswil/Jona, Switzerland	8
Annual
22	2004	11–19 September	Västerås, Sweden	8
23	2005	9–15 August	Aichi, Japan	8
24	2006	1–5 August	Århus, Denmark	8
25	2007	18–26 August	Kyiv, Ukraine	8
26	2008	10–20 July	Olomouc, Czech Republic	8
27	2009	16–23 August	Miskolc, Hungary	8
28	2010	8–15 August	Trondheim, Norway	8
29	2011	13–20 August	Savoie, France	8
30	2012	14–22 July	Lausanne, Switzerland	8
31	2013	6–14 July	Vuokatti, Finland	8
32	2014	5–13 July	Trentino-Veneto, Italy	9
33	2015	1–7 August	Inverness, United Kingdom	9
34	2016	20–28 August ]	Strömstad-Tanum, Sweden	9
35	2017	1–7 July	Tartu, Estonia	9
36	2018	4–11 August	Riga, Latvia	9
Alternating
37	2019	13–17 August	Østfold, Norway	6
–	~~2020~~	Cancelled due to the COVID-19 pandemic	~~Triangle Region, Denmark~~	–
38	2021	4–9 July	Doksy, Czech Republic	9
39	2022	26—30 June	Triangle Region, Denmark	5
40	2023	11—16 July	Graubünden, Switzerland	6
41	2024	12–16 July	Edinburgh, United Kingdom	5
42	2025	7–12 July	Kuopio, Finland	6
43	2026	6—11 July	Genova, Italy	5
44	2027	14—18 July	Veszprém, Hungary	
45	2028	26—30 April	Girona, Spain	

== Multiple winners ==
=== Men ===
Boldface denotes active athletes and highest medal count among all athletes (including these who not included in these tables) per type. Updated after the Knock-out Sprint race at the 2026 World Orienteering Championships.

Rank	Athlete	From	To	Gold	Silver	Bronze	Total
1	(France) Thierry Gueorgiou	2003	2017	**14**	5	4	23
2	(Norway) Olav Lundanes	2010	2019	10	4	3	17
3	(Switzerland) **Daniel Hubmann**	2005	2023	9	**11**	**9**	**29**
4	(Switzerland) **Matthias Kyburz**	2012	2025	8	6	2	16
5	(Norway) Øyvin Thon	1979	1989	7	1	0	8
6	(Russia) Andrey Khramov	2005	2015	6	4	3	13
7	(Norway) **Kasper Harlem Fosser**	2019	2026	5	5	2	12
8	(Sweden) **Gustav Bergman**	2012	2023	5	4	5	14
9	(Norway) Petter Thoresen	1989	1997	5	1	2	8
10	(Russia) Valentin Novikov	2004	2013	4	5	2	11
11	(Norway) Bjørnar Valstad	1991	2004	4	3	3	10
12	(Norway) Tore Sagvolden	1979	1987	4	3	1	8
13	(Sweden) Rolf Pettersson	1972	1979	4	2	0	6
14	(Sweden) Jonas Leandersson	2012	2018	4	0	3	7
15	(Norway) Morten Berglia	1981	1987	4	0	1	5
15	(Norway) Jørgen Rostrup	1999	2005	4	0	1	5
17	(Switzerland) Thomas Bührer	1991	2003	4	0	0	4
18	(Norway) **Magne Dæhli**	2012	2019	3	2	2	7
19	(Norway) Egil Johansen	1976	1979	3	2	0	5
20	(Sweden) Emil Wingstedt	2003	2007	3	1	3	7
21	(Sweden) Bernt Frilén	1970	1974	3	1	1	5
22	(Denmark) Søren Bobach	2014	2016	3	1	0	4
23	(Norway) **Eskil Kinneberg**	2017	2021	3	1	0	4
24	(Norway) Åge Hadler	1966	1972	3	0	3	6
25	(Sweden) **Emil Svensk**	2018	2024	3	0	2	5
26	(Switzerland) Christian Aebersold	1991	1995	3	0	0	3
26	(Sweden) Arne Johansson	1972	1976	3	0	0	3
26	(Sweden) Karl Johansson	1966	1970	3	0	0	3
29	(Sweden) Jörgen Mårtensson	1981	1997	2	6	2	10
30	(Finland) Jani Lakanen	1999	2013	2	5	1	8
31	(Finland) Janne Salmi	1995	2001	2	4	1	7
32	(Norway) Carl Godager Kaas	2010	2016	2	4	0	6

=== Women ===
Boldface denotes active athletes and highest medal count among all athletes (including these who not included in these tables) per type. Updated after the 2026 World Orienteering Championships.

Rank	Athlete	From	To	Gold	Silver	Bronze	Total
1	(Sweden) **Tove Alexandersson**	2011	2025	**23**	**10**	3	**36**
2	(Switzerland) Simone Niggli-Luder	2001	2013	**23**	2	6	31
3	(Finland) Minna Kauppi	2004	2013	9	5	3	17
4	(Denmark) Maja Alm	2012	2021	7	7	3	17
5	(Sweden) Marita Skogum	1983	1993	6	3	1	10
6	(Sweden) Annichen Kringstad	1981	1985	6	0	0	6
7	(Switzerland) Judith Wyder	2011	2018	5	3	4	12
8	(Russia) (Switzerland) **Natalia Gemperle**	2016	2026	4	7	8	19
9	(Sweden) Helena Bergman	2012	2018	4	6	**8**	18
10	(Switzerland) **Simona Aebersold**	2019	2026	4	6	6	16
11	(Norway) Hanne Staff	1997	2004	4	4	4	12
12	(Finland) Liisa Veijalainen	1972	1981	4	4	0	8
13	(Sweden) Karin Rabe	1978	1989	4	3	2	9
14	(Sweden) Arja Hannus	1981	1991	4	1	0	5
15	(Norway) Anne Margrethe Hausken	2005	2016	3	5	3	11
16	(Sweden) Annika Billstam	2007	2015	3	3	**8**	14
17	(Finland) Heli Jukkola	2003	2007	3	3	2	8
18	(Sweden) Ulla Lindkvist	1966	1972	3	3	0	6
19	(Finland) Merja Rantanen	2008	2017	3	1	4	8
20	(Switzerland) Vroni König-Salmi	1997	2008	3	1	3	7
21	(Sweden) Marlena Jansson	1991	1999	3	1	2	6
22	(Sweden) Anna Bogren	1993	1997	3	1	1	5
22	(Sweden) Lina Strand	2016	2022	3	1	1	5
24	(Sweden) **Sara Hagström**	2021	2023	3	0	0	3
25	(Sweden) Karolina A. Højsgaard	2003	2009	2	5	1	8
26	(Denmark) Ida Bobach	2011	2016	2	4	0	6
27	(Sweden) Kristin Cullman	1974	1978	2	3	0	5
27	(Sweden) **Karolin Ohlsson**	2018	2026	2	3	0	5
29	(Sweden) Gunilla Svärd	1997	2004	2	2	2	6
30	(Finland) Outi Borgenström	1974	1981	2	2	1	5
30	(Czech Republic) Dana Brožková	2006	2011	2	2	1	5
30	(Norway) Ingrid Hadler	1966	1974	2	2	1	5
33	(Finland) Kirsi Boström (Tiira)	1993	1999	2	2	0	4
33	(Denmark) Emma Klingenberg	2014	2015	2	2	0	4

=== Mixed ===
Sprint Relay

Year	Gold	Silver	Bronze
2014	Switzerland	Denmark	Russia
2015	Denmark	Norway	Russia
2016	Denmark	Switzerland	Sweden
2017	Sweden	Denmark	Switzerland
2018	Sweden	Switzerland	Denmark
2021	Sweden	Norway	Switzerland
2022	Sweden	United Kingdom	Norway
2024	Switzerland	Finland	Norway
2026	Switzerland	Sweden	Norway

== All-time medal table ==
(Updated after WOC 2026)

Rank	Nation	Gold	Silver	Bronze	Total
1	Sweden	74	64	63	201
2	Norway	57	55	52	164
3	Switzerland	54	45	46	145
4	Finland	24	46	35	105
5	France	15	8	11	34
6	Denmark	12	10	7	29
7	Russia	11	12	15	38
8	Great Britain	4	6	5	15
9	Czech Republic	3	2	5	10
10	Hungary	3	1	2	6
11	Czechoslovakia	2	5	8	15
12	Ukraine	1	3	5	9
13	Austria	1	1	1	3
14	Latvia	1	0	2	3
15	Australia	1	0	0	1
–	Independent Athletes	0	2	0	2
16	New Zealand	0	1	1	2
17	Soviet Union	0	0	2	2
18	Belarus	0	0	1	1
18	Belgium	0	0	1	1
18	Germany	0	0	1	1
18	Italy	0	0	1	1
18	Netherlands	0	0	1	1
Totals (22 entries)		263	261	265	789

== See also ==
- List of World Orienteering Championships medalists (men)
- List of World Orienteering Championships medalists (women)
- List of World Orienteering Championships medalists (mixed events)
