= List of World Orienteering Championships medalists (women) =

This is a list of medalists from the World Orienteering Championships in women's orienteering.

== Individual/Classic/Long ==
This event was called "Individual" from 1966 to 1989 and "Classic distance" from 1991 to 2001. Since 2003 it is called "Long distance".

Year	Gold	Silver	Bronze	Length and controls
1966	(Sweden) Ulla Lindkvist	(Switzerland) Katharina Perch-Nielsen	(Finland) Raila Hovi	6.6 km, 6 controls
1968	(Sweden) Ulla Lindkvist	(Norway) Ingrid Hadler	(Sweden) Kerstin Granstedt	7.8 km, 10 controls
1970	(Norway) Ingrid Hadler	(Sweden) Ulla Lindkvist	(Norway) Kristin Danielsen	7.5 km, 10 controls
1972	(Hungary) Sarolta Monspart	(Finland) Pirjo Seppä	(Sweden) Birgitta Larsson	7.1 km, 12 controls
1974	(Denmark) Mona Nørgaard	(Sweden) Kristin Cullmann	(Finland) Outi Borgenström	7.9 km, 14 controls
1976	(Finland) Liisa Veijalainen	(Sweden) Kristin Cullmann	(Sweden) Anne Lundmark	8.9 km, 16 controls
1978	(Norway) Anne Berit Eid	(Finland) Liisa Veijalainen	(Norway) Wenche Jacobsen	8.6 km, 14 controls
1979	(Finland) Outi Borgenström	(Finland) Liisa Veijalainen	(Sweden) Monica Andersson	8.3 km, 10 controls
1981	(Sweden) Annichen Kringstad	(Norway) Brit Volden	(Sweden) Karin Rabe	8.7 km, 12 controls
1983	(Sweden) Annichen Kringstad	(Sweden) Marita Skogum	(Finland) Annariitta Kottonen	8.1 km, 18 controls
1985	(Sweden) Annichen Kringstad	(Norway) Brit Volden	(Sweden) Christina Blomqvist	8.4 km, 14 controls
1987	(Sweden) Arja Hannus	(Sweden) Karin Rabe	(Czech Republic) Jana Galíková	8.8 km, 15 controls
1989	(Sweden) Marita Skogum	(Czech Republic) Jana Galíková	(Soviet Union) Alīda Ābola	9.7 km, 15 controls
1991	(Hungary) Katalin Oláh	(Sweden) Christina Blomqvist	(Czech Republic) Jana Galíková	10.5 km, 16 controls
1993	(Sweden) Marita Skogum	(Finland) Annika Viilo	(United Kingdom) Yvette Hague	8.6 km, 14 controls
1995	(Hungary) Katalin Oláh	(United Kingdom) Yvette Hague (Finland) Eija Koskivaara		9.7 km, 21 controls
1997	(Norway) Hanne Staff	(Sweden) Katarina Borg	(Norway) Hanne Sandstad	8.7 km, 17 controls
1999	(Finland) Kirsi Boström	(Norway) Hanne Staff	(Finland) Johanna Asklöf	10.3 km, 18 controls
2001	(Switzerland) Simone Luder	(Finland) Marika Mikkola	(Finland) Reeta-Mari Kolkkala	9.7 km, 17 controls
2003	(Switzerland) Simone Luder	(Sweden) Karolina Arewång-Höjsgaard	(Switzerland) Brigitte Wolf	11.8 km, 19 controls
2004	(Sweden) Karolina A Höjsgaard	(Norway) Hanne Staff	(Finland) Marika Mikkola	11.0 km, 25 controls
2005	(Switzerland) Simone Niggli-Luder	(Finland) Heli Jukkola	(Switzerland) Vroni König Salmi	8.8 km, 21 controls
2006	(Switzerland) Simone Niggli-Luder	(Norway) Marianne Andersen	(Czech Republic) Dana Brožková	11.7 km, 24 controls
2007	(Finland) Minna Kauppi (Finland) Heli Jukkola		(Switzerland) Simone Niggli-Luder	11.95 km, 23 controls
2008	(Czech Republic) Dana Brožková	(Norway) Marianne Andersen	(Sweden) Annika Billstam	11.9 km, 24 controls
2009	(Switzerland) Simone Niggli-Luder	(Norway) Marianne Andersen	(Finland) Minna Kauppi	11.8 km, 27 controls
2010	(Switzerland) Simone Niggli-Luder	(Norway) Marianne Andersen	(Sweden) Emma Claesson	9.9 km, 23 controls
2011	(Sweden) Annika Billstam	(Czech Republic) Dana Brožková	(Sweden) Helena Jansson	10.3 km, 21 controls
2012	(Switzerland) Simone Niggli-Luder	(Finland) Minna Kauppi	(Sweden) Annika Billstam	12.4 km, 23 controls
2013	(Switzerland) Simone Niggli-Luder	(Sweden) Tove Alexandersson	(Sweden) Lena Eliasson	13.9 km, 23 controls
2014	(Russia) Svetlana Mironova	(Sweden) Tove Alexandersson	(Switzerland) Judith Wyder	11 km, 23 controls
2015	(Denmark) Ida Bobach	(Norway) Mari Fasting	(Russia) Svetlana Mironova	9.7 km, 19 controls
2016	(Sweden) Tove Alexandersson	(Russia) Natalia Gemperle	(Norway) Anne Margrethe Hausken Nordberg	11.2 km, 18 controls
2017	(Sweden) Tove Alexandersson	(Denmark) Maja Alm	(Russia) Natalia Gemperle	11.4 km, 20 controls
2018	(Sweden) Tove Alexandersson	(Denmark) Maja Alm	(Switzerland) Sabine Hauswirth	9.9 km, 18 controls
2019	(Sweden) Tove Alexandersson	(Sweden) Lina Strand	(Switzerland) Simona Aebersold	11.7 km, 21 controls
2021	(Sweden) Tove Alexandersson	(Russia) Natalia Gemperle	(Switzerland) Simona Aebersold	9.5 km, 21 controls
2023	(Switzerland) Simona Aebersold	(Sweden) Tove Alexandersson	(Norway) Andrine Benjaminsen	11.0 km, 23 controls
2025	(Switzerland) Simona Aebersold	(Sweden) Tove Alexandersson	(Norway) Andrine Benjaminsen	13.3 km, 23 controls

== Short/Middle ==
This event was first held in 1991. The format was changed and renamed "Middle Distance" in 2003 with the introduction of the Sprint discipline.

Year	Gold	Silver	Bronze	Length and controls
Short distance
1991	(Czech Republic) Jana Cieslarová	(Czech Republic) Ada Kuchařová	(Sweden) Marita Skogum	5.5 km, 9 controls
1993	(Sweden) Anna Bogren	(Sweden) Marita Skogum	(Finland) Eija Koskivaara	3.7 km, 11 controls
1995	(Switzerland) Marie-Luce Romanens	(United Kingdom) Yvette Hague	(Sweden) Marlena Jansson (Sweden) Anna Bogren	4.6 km, 14 controls
1997	(Austria) Lucie Böhm	(Norway) Hanne Sandstad	(Norway) Hanne Staff (Switzerland) Marie-Luce Romanens	3.3 km, 13 controls
1999	(United Kingdom) Yvette Baker	(Austria) Lucie Böhm	(Germany) Frauke Schmitt Gran	3.6 km, 13 controls
2001	(Norway) Hanne Staff	(Sweden) Jenny Johansson	(Sweden) Gunilla Svärd	3.6 km, 11 controls
Middle distance
2003	(Switzerland) Simone Luder	(Norway) Hanne Staff	(Finland) Heli Jukkola	4.5 km, 18 controls
2004	(Norway) Hanne Staff	(Russia) Tatiana Ryabkina	(Finland) Heli Jukkola	5.3 km, 16 controls
2005	(Switzerland) Simone Niggli-Luder	(Sweden) Jenny Johansson	(Finland) Minna Kauppi	4.1 km, 13 controls
2006	(Switzerland) Simone Niggli-Luder	(Norway) Marianne Andersen	(Russia) Tatiana Ryabkina	5.2 km, 22 controls
2007	(Switzerland) Simone Niggli-Luder	(Finland) Heli Jukkola	(Norway) Marianne Andersen	5.08 km, 14 controls
2008	(Finland) Minna Kauppi	(Switzerland) Vroni König-Salmi	(Czech Republic) Radka Brožková	4.8 km, 23 controls
2009	(Czech Republic) Dana Brožková	(Norway) Marianne Andersen	(Switzerland) Simone Niggli-Luder	5.34 km, 22 controls
2010	(Finland) Minna Kauppi	(Switzerland) Simone Niggli-Luder	(Norway) Marianne Andersen	4.53 km, 16 controls
2011	(Sweden) Helena Jansson	(Denmark) Ida Bobach	(Switzerland) Judith Wyder	3.8 km, 16 controls
2012	(Finland) Minna Kauppi	(Sweden) Tove Alexandersson	(Russia) Tatiana Ryabkina	5.5 km, 18 controls
2013	(Switzerland) Simone Niggli-Luder	(Sweden) Tove Alexandersson	(Finland) Merja Rantanen	5.0 km, 15 controls
2014	(Sweden) Annika Billstam	(Denmark) Ida Bobach	(Sweden) Tove Alexandersson	5.0 km, 16 controls
2015	(Sweden) Annika Billstam	(Finland) Merja Rantanen	(Sweden) Emma Johansson	5.3 km, 21 controls
2016	(Sweden) Tove Alexandersson	(Norway) Heidi Bagstevold	(Russia) Natalia Gemperle	5.1 km, 21 controls
2017	(Sweden) Tove Alexandersson	(Norway) Marianne Andersen	(Finland) Venla Harju	5.1 km, 21 controls
2018	(Russia) Natalia Gemperle	(Finland) Marika Teini	(France) Isia Basset	4.8 km, 17 controls
2019	(Sweden) Tove Alexandersson	(Switzerland) Simona Aebersold	(Finland) Venla Harju (Russia) Natalia Gemperle	5.5 km, 20 controls
2021	(Sweden) Tove Alexandersson	(Norway) Andrine Benjaminsen	(Switzerland) Simona Aebersold	4.5 km, 20 controls
2023	(Sweden) Tove Alexandersson	(Switzerland) Natalia Gemperle	(Sweden) Hanna Lundberg	4.8 km, 19 controls
2025	(Sweden) Tove Alexandersson	(Sweden) Sanna Fast	(Sweden) Hanna Lundberg	5 km, 16 controls

== Sprint ==
This event was first held in 2001.

Year	Gold	Silver	Bronze	Length and controls
2001	(Switzerland) Vroni König-Salmi	(Finland) Johanna Asklöf	(Switzerland) Simone Luder	2.24 km, 10 controls
2003	(Switzerland) Simone Luder	(Switzerland) Marie-Luce Romanens	(Sweden) Jenny Johansson	2.6 km, 17 controls
2004	(Switzerland) Simone Niggli-Luder	(Sweden) Karolina A Höjsgaard	(Norway) Elisabeth Ingvaldsen	2.6 km, 11 controls
2005	(Switzerland) Simone Niggli-Luder	(Norway) Anne Margrethe Hausken	(United Kingdom) Heather Monro	2.1 km, 12 controls
2006	(Australia) Hanny Allston	(Switzerland) Simone Niggli-Luder	(Sweden) Kajsa Nilsson	2.7 km, 15 controls
2007	(Switzerland) Simone Niggli-Luder	(Finland) Minna Kauppi	(Sweden) Lena Eliasson	2.47 km, 14 controls
2008	(Norway) Anne Margrethe Hausken	(Finland) Minna Kauppi	(Sweden) Helena Jansson	2.5 km, 17 controls
2009	(Sweden) Helena Jansson	(Sweden) Linnéa Gustafsson	(Switzerland) Simone Niggli-Luder	2.6 km, 18 controls
2010	(Switzerland) Simone Niggli-Luder	(Sweden) Helena Jansson	(Norway) Marianne Andersen	2.6 km, 21 controls
2011	(Sweden) Linnea Gustafsson	(Sweden) Helena Jansson	(Sweden) Lena Eliasson	2.2 km, 19 controls
2012	(Switzerland) Simone Niggli-Luder	(Denmark) Maja Alm	(Sweden) Annika Billstam	3.7 km, 19 controls
2013	(Switzerland) Simone Niggli-Luder	(Sweden) Annika Billstam	(Finland) Venla Niemi	3.4 km, 21 controls
2014	(Switzerland) Judith Wyder	(Sweden) Tove Alexandersson	(Denmark) Maja Alm	4.05 km, 18 controls
2015	(Denmark) Maja Alm	(Ukraine) Nadiya Volynska	(Russia) Galina Vinogradova	3.8 km, 21 controls
2016	(Denmark) Maja Alm	(Switzerland) Judith Wyder	(Belarus) Anastasia Denisova	3.6 km, 20 controls
2017	(Denmark) Maja Alm	(Russia) Natalia Gemperle	(Russia) Galina Vinogradova	3.4 km, 13 controls
2018	(Denmark) Maja Alm	(Sweden) Tove Alexandersson	(Switzerland) Judith Wyder	3.8 km, 17 controls
2021	(Sweden) Tove Alexandersson	(Russia) Natalia Gemperle	(Denmark) Maja Alm	3.5 km, 20 controls
2022	(United Kingdom) Megan Carter Davies	(Switzerland) Simona Aebersold	(United Kingdom) Alice Leake	3.8 km, 19 controls
2024	(Sweden) Tove Alexandersson	(Switzerland) Simona Aebersold	(Switzerland) Natalia Gemperle	3.8 km, 18 controls
2026	(Switzerland) Simona Aebersold	(Norway) Pia Young Vik	(Czech Republic) Lucie Dittrichová	3.2 km, 19 controls

== Knock-out Sprint ==
This event was first held in 2022.

Year	Gold	Silver	Bronze	Length and controls
2022	(Sweden) Tove Alexandersson	(United Kingdom) Megan Carter Davies	(Netherlands) Eef van Dongen	2.4 km, 11 controls
2024	(Sweden) Tove Alexandersson	(Sweden) Karolin Ohlsson	(Switzerland) Simona Aebersold	
2026	(Czech Republic) Tereza Rauturier	(Sweden) Karolin Ohlsson	(Norway) Pia Young Vik	1.9 km, 11 controls

== Relay ==
Year	Gold	Silver	Bronze
1966	Sweden Kerstin Granstedt; Eivor Steen-Olsson; Gunborg Åhling	Finland Anja Meldo; Pirjo Ruotsalainen; Raila Hovi	Norway Astrid Hansen; Ragnhild Kristensen; Ingrid Thoresen
1968	Norway Astrid Rødmyr; Astrid Hansen; Ingrid Hadler	Sweden Gun-Britt Nyberg; Kerstin Granstedt; Ulla Lindkvist	Finland Pirjo Seppä; Tuula Hovi; Raila Kerkelä
1970	Sweden Birgitta Larsson; Eivor Steen-Olsson; Ulla Lindkvist	Hungary Magda Horváth; Ágnes Hegedűs; Sarolta Monspart	Norway Astrid Rødmyr; Kristin Danielsen; Ingrid Hadler
1972	Finland Sinikka Kukkonen; Pirjo Seppä; Liisa Veijalainen	Sweden Birgitta Johansson; Ulla Lindkvist; Birgitta Larsson	Czechoslovakia Naďa Mertová; Renata Vlachová; Anna Hanzlová
1974	Sweden Birgitta Larsson; Monica Andersson; Kristin Cullman	Norway Kristin Danielsen; Ingrid Hadler; Linda Verde	Czechoslovakia Dana Procházková; Anna Handzlová; Renata Vlachová
1976	Sweden Ingrid Ohlsson; Kristin Cullman; Anne Lundmark	Finland Outi Borgenström; Sinikka Kukkonen; Liisa Veijalainen	Hungary Irén Rostás; Magdolna Kovács; Sarolta Monspart
1978	Finland Outi Borgenström; Marita Ruoho; Liisa Veijalainen	Sweden Eva Moberg; Karin Rabe; Kristin Cullmann	Switzerland Ruth Baumberger; Ruth Humbel; Hanni Fries
1979	Finland Leena Silvennoinen; Leena Salmenkylä; Liisa Veijalainen	Norway Anne Berit Eid; Astrid Carlson; Brit Volden	Sweden Anna-Lena Axelsson; Karin Rabe; Monica Andersson
1981	Sweden Arja Hannus; Barbro Lönnkvist; Karin Rabe; Annichen Kringstad	Finland Helena Mannervesi; Marita Ruoho; Liisa Veijalainen; Outi Borgenström	Switzerland Ruth Schmid; Annelies Meier; Irene Bucher; Ruth Humbel
1983	Sweden Karin Rabe; Marita Skogum; Kerstin Månsson; Annichen Kringstad	Czechoslovakia Iva Knapová-Kalibánová-Kusynová; Eva Bártová; Jana Hlaváčová; Ada Kuchařová	Denmark Mette Filskov; Hanne Birke; Karin Jexner; Dorthe Hansen
1985	Sweden Karin Rabe; Christina Blomqvist; Kerstin Månsson; Annichen Kringstad	Norway Ragnhild Bratberg; Hilde Tellesbø; Helle Johansen; Ellen Sofie Olsvik	Switzerland Susanne Lüscher; Frauke Sonderegger; Brigitte Zürcher; Ruth Humbel
1987	Norway Ragnhild Bratberg; Ragnhild Bente Andersen; Ellen Sofie Olsvik; Brit Volden	Sweden Arja Hannus; Katarina Borg; Marita Skogum; Karin Rabe	Czechoslovakia Iva Knapová-Kalibánová-Kusynová; Iva Slaninová; Ada Kuchařová; Jana Galíková
1989	Sweden Karin Rabe; Arja Hannus; Kerstin Haglund; Marita Skogum	Czechoslovakia Petra Wagnerová; Jana Cieslarová; Ada Kuchařová; Jana Galíková	Finland Marja Liisa Portin; Ulla Mänttäri; Annika Viilo; Eija Koskivaara
1991	Sweden Arja Hannus; Christina Blomqvist; Marlena Jansson; Marita Skogum	Norway Hanne Sandstad; Heidi Arnesen; Ragnhild Bratberg; Ragnhild Bente Andersen	Czech Republic Marcela Kubatková; Jana Galíková; Ada Kuchařová; Jana Cieslarová
1993	Sweden Anette Nilsson; Marlena Jansson; Anna Bogren; Marita Skogum	Finland Johanna Tiira; Kirsi Tiira; Annika Viilo; Eija Koskivaara	Czech Republic Petra Novotná; Mária Honzová; Marcela Kubatková; Jana Cieslarová
1995	Finland Kirsi Tiira; Reeta-Mari Kolkkala; Eija Koskivaara; Annika Viilo	Sweden Anette Granstedt; Maria Gustafsson; Anna Bogren; Marlena Jansson	Czech Republic Petra Novotná; Mária Honzová; Marcela Kubatková; Jana Cieslarová
1997	Sweden Anna Bogren; Gunilla Svärd; Cecilia Nilsson; Marlena Jansson	Norway Torunn Fossli Sæthre; Elisabeth Ingvaldsen; Hanne Sandstad; Hanne Staff	Switzerland Brigitte Wolf; Marie-Luce Romanens; Vroni König; Sabrina Meister-Fesseler
1999	Norway Birgitte Husebye; Elisabeth Ingvaldsen; Hanne Sandstad; Hanne Staff	Finland Reeta-Mari Kolkkala; Sanna Nymalm; Kirsi Tiira; Johanna Asklöf	Sweden Katarina Allberg; Marlena Jansson; Anette Granstedt; Gunilla Svärd
2001	Finland Reeta-Mari Kolkkala; Liisa Anttila; Marika Mikkola; Johanna Asklöf	Sweden Katarina Allberg; Jenny Johansson; Cecilia Nilsson; Gunilla Svärd	Norway Birgitte Husebye; Linda Antonsen; Elisabeth Ingvaldsen; Hanne Staff
2003	Switzerland Birgitte Wolf; Vroni König-Salmi; Simone Luder	Sweden Gunilla Svärd; Karolina Arewång-Höjsgaard; Jenny Johansson	Norway Elisabeth Ingvaldsen; Birgitte Husebye; Hanne Staff
2004	Sweden Gunilla Svärd; Jenny Johansson; Karolina Arewång-Höjsgaard	Finland Marika Mikkola; Minna Kauppi; Heli Jukkola	Norway Birgitte Husebye; Elisabeth Ingvaldsen; Hanne Staff
2005	Switzerland Lea Müller; Vroni König Salmi; Simone Niggli-Luder	Norway Marianne Andersen; Marianne Riddervold; Anne Margrethe Hausken	Sweden Jenny Johansson; Karolina Arewång-Höjsgaard; Emma Engstrand
2006	Finland Paula Haapakoski; Heli Jukkola; Minna Kauppi	Sweden Jenny Johansson; Kajsa Nilsson; Karolina Arewång-Höjsgaard	Switzerland Martina Fritschy; Vroni König-Salmi; Simone Niggli-Luder
2007	Finland Paula Haapakoski; Heli Jukkola; Minna Kauppi	Sweden Annika Billstam; Emma Engstrand; Helena Jansson	Norway Ingunn Hultgreen Weltzien; Marianne Andersen; Anne Margrethe Hausken
2008	Finland Katri Lindeqvist; Merja Rantanen; Minna Kauppi	Russia Galina Vinogradova; Yulia Novikova; Tatiana Ryabkina	Sweden Annika Billstam; Sofie Johansson; Helena Jansson
2009	Norway Betty Ann Bjerkreim Nilsen; Anne Margrethe Hausken; Marianne Andersen	Sweden Karolina A. Höjsgaard; Kajsa Nilsson; Helena Jansson	Finland Bodil Holmström; Merja Rantanen; Minna Kauppi
2010	Finland Anni-Maija Fincke; Merja Rantanen; Minna Kauppi	Norway Elise Egseth; Anne Margrethe Hausken; Marianne Andersen	Sweden Annika Billstam; Emma Claesson; Helena Jansson
2011	Finland Anni-Maija Fincke; Merja Rantanen; Minna Kauppi	Czech Republic Martina Zvěřinová; Eva Juřeníková; Dana Brožková	Sweden Helena Jansson; Tove Alexandersson; Annika Billstam
2012	Switzerland Ines Brodmann; Judith Wyder; Simone Niggli-Luder	Sweden Annika Billstam; Helena Jansson; Tove Alexandersson	Norway Silje Ekroll Jahren; Mari Fasting; Anne Margrethe Hausken
2013	Norway Heidi Bagstevold; Mari Fasting; Anne Marghrete Hausken Nordberg	Finland Venla Niemi; Anni-Maija Fincke; Minna Kauppi	Switzerland Sara Lüscher; Judith Wyder; Simone Niggli-Luder
2014	Switzerland Sara Lüscher; Sabine Hauswirth; Judith Wyder	Denmark Emma Klingenberg; Ida Bobach; Maja Møller Alm	Sweden Helena Jansson; Annika Billstam; Tove Alexandersson
2015	Denmark Maja Møller Alm; Ida Bobach; Emma Klingenberg	Norway Heidi Østlid Bagstevold; Mari Fasting; Anne Margrethe Hausken	Sweden Helena Jansson; Annika Billstam; Emma Johansson
2016	Russia Anastasia Rudnaya; Svetlana Mironova; Natalia Gemperle	Denmark Signe Klinting; Ida Bobach; Maja Møller Alm	Finland Sari Anttonen; Marika Teini; Merja Rantanen
2017	Sweden Emma Johansson; Helena Jansson; Tove Alexandersson	Russia Anastasia Rudnaya; Svetlana Mironova; Natalia Gemperle	Finland Venla Harju; Marika Teini; Merja Rantanen
2018	Switzerland Elena Roos; Julia Jakob; Judith Wyder	Sweden Helena Bergman; Karolin Ohlsson; Tove Alexandersson	Russia Anastasia Rudnaya; Tatyana Riabkina; Natalia Gemperle
2019	Sweden Lina Strand; Tove Alexandersson; Karolin Ohlsson	Switzerland Sabine Hauswirth; Simona Aebersold; Julia Jakob	Russia Anastasia Rudnaya; Tatiana Ryabkina; Natalia Gemperle
2021	Sweden Lisa Risby; Sara Hagström; Tove Alexandersson	Switzerland Elena Roos; Sabine Hauswirth; Simona Aebersold	Norway Marie Olaussen; Kamilla Steiwer; Andrine Benjaminsen
2023	Sweden Hanna Lundberg; Sara Hagström; Tove Alexandersson	Switzerland Elena Roos; Natalia Gemperle; Simona Aebersold	Norway Marianne Andersen; Marie Olaussen; Andrine Benjaminsen
2025	Sweden Hanna Lundberg; Sanna Fast; Tove Alexandersson	Norway Pia Young Vik; Marie Olaussen; Andrine Benjaminsen	Switzerland Paula Gross; Natalia Gemperle; Simona Aebersold

== Medal table ==
Women's orienteering. Does not include mixed events. Updated following the 2026 World Orienteering Championships.

Rank	Nation	Gold	Silver	Bronze	Total
1	Sweden	47	38	32	117
2	Switzerland	30	13	23	66
3	Finland	18	21	20	59
4	Norway	11	28	20	59
5	Denmark	7	7	3	17
6	Russia (1993–present)	3	7	10	20
7	Czech Republic (1993–present)	3	2	5	10
8	Hungary	3	1	1	5
9	Great Britain	2	3	3	8
10	Czechoslovakia (1966–91)	1	4	6	11
11	Austria	1	1	0	2
12	Australia	1	0	0	1
13	Ukraine	0	1	0	1
14	Belarus	0	0	1	1
14	France	0	0	1	1
14	Germany	0	0	1	1
14	Netherlands	0	0	1	1
14	Soviet Union (1966–91)	0	0	1	1
Totals (18 entries)		127	126	128	381

== Multiple medalists ==
Updated following the 2025 World Orienteering Championships.

Rank	Athlete	Country	From	To	Gold	Silver	Bronze	Total
1	Tove Alexandersson	Sweden	2011	2025	23	10	3	36
2	Simone Niggli	Switzerland	2001	2013	23	2	6	31
3	Minna Kauppi	Finland	2004	2013	9	5	3	17
4	Maja Alm	Denmark	2012	2021	7	7	3	17
5	Marita Skogum	Sweden	1983	1993	6	3	1	10
6	Annichen Kringstad	Sweden	1981	1985	6	-	-	6
7	Judith Wyder	Switzerland	2011	2018	5	3	4	12
8	Helena Bergman	Sweden	2012	2018	4	6	8	18
9	Hanne Staff	Norway	1997	2004	4	4	4	12
10	Liisa Veijalainen	Finland	1972	1981	4	4	-	8

== Best performers by country ==
Including mixed events. Updated to following the 2025 World Orienteering Championships

Country	Athlete	From	To	Gold	Silver	Bronze	Total
Sweden	Tove Alexandersson	2011	2025	23	10	3	36
Switzerland	Simone Niggli-Luder	2001	2013	23	2	6	31
Finland	Minna Kauppi	2004	2013	9	5	3	17
Denmark	Maja Alm	2012	2021	7	7	3	17
Norway	Hanne Staff (by the gold first ranking system)	1997	2004	4	4	4	12
Norway	Marianne Andersen (by total number of medals)	2005	2023	1	9	5	15
Russia	Natalia Gemperle	2016	2021	2	4	5	11
Czech Republic	Dana Brožková	2006	2011	2	2	1	5
Hungary	Katalin Oláh (by the gold first ranking system)	1991	1995	2	-	-	2
Hungary	Sarolta Monspart (by total number of medals)	1970	1976	1	1	1	3
United Kingdom	Yvette Baker	1993	1999	1	2	1	4
Czechoslovakia; Czech Republic	Jana Cieslarová	1989	1995	1	1	3	5
Czechoslovakia (as such only)	Jana Cieslarová	1989	1991	1	1	1	3
Austria	Lucie Böhm*	1997	1999	1	1	-	2
Australia	Hanny Allston*	2006	2006	1	-	-	1
Ukraine	Nadiya Volynska*	2015	2015	-	1	-	1
Belarus	Anastasia Denisova*	2016	2016	-	-	1	1
Germany	Frauke Schmitt Gran*	1999	1999	-	-	1	1
France	Isia Basset*	2018	2018	-	-	1	1
Netherlands	Eef van Dongen*	2022	2022	-	-	1	1
Soviet Union	Alīda Ābola*	1989	1989	-	-	1	1

An asterisk (*) marks athletes who are the only representatives of their respective countries to win a medal.
