= 1983 World Orienteering Championships =

1983 edition of the World Orienteering Championships

- Host city: Zalaegerszeg
- Country: Hungary
- Events: 4

The 1983 World Orienteering Championships, the 10th World Orienteering Championships, were held in Zalaegerszeg, Hungary, 1–4 September 1983.

The championships had four events; individual contests for men and women, and relays for men and women.

== Medalists ==
Event	Gold		Silver		Bronze	
Men's individual	Morten Berglia (NOR)	1.36.31	Øyvin Thon (NOR)	1.38.51	Sigurd Dæhli (NOR)	1.41.00
Women's individual	Annichen Kringstad (SWE)	1.08.32	Marita Skogum (SWE)	1.16.05	Annariitta Kottonen (FIN)	1.16.11
Men's relay	Norway (NOR): Morten Berglia; Øyvin Thon; Tore Sagvolden; Harald Thon	3.52.39	Czechoslovakia (TCH): Vlastimil Uchytil; Pavel Ditrych; Jozef Pollak; Jaroslav Kacmarcik	3.54.17	Sweden (SWE): Bengt Levin; Kjell Lauri; Lars Lönnkvist; Kent Olsson	3.54.21
Women's relay	Sweden (SWE): Karin Rabe; Marita Skogum; Kerstin Månsson; Annichen Kringstad	3.10.25	Czechoslovakia (TCH): Iva Kalibanova; Eva Bartova; Jana Hlavacova; Ada Kucharova	3.16.54	Denmark (DEN): Mette Filskov; Hanne Birke; Karin Jexner; Dorthe Hansen	3.24.45

== Results ==
=== Men's individual ===
WOC 1983 – Individual – Men (14.0 km)
Rank	Competitor	Nation	Time
1	Morten Berglia	Norway	1:36:31
2	Øyvin Thon	Norway	
3	Sigurd Dæhli	Norway	
4	Tore Sagvolden	Norway	
5	Kari Sallinen	Finland	
6	Jaroslav Kacmarcik	Czechoslovakia	
7	Kent Olsson	Sweden	
8	Markus Stappung	Switzerland	
9	Zoltán Kiss	Hungary	
10	Willi Müller	Switzerland	

=== Women's individual ===
WOC 1983 – Individual – Women (8.1 km)
Rank	Competitor	Nation	Time
1	Annichen Kringstad-Svensson	Sweden	1:08:32
2	Marita Skogum	Sweden	
3	Annariitta Kottonen	Finland	
4	Brit Volden	Norway	
5	Jorunn Teigen	Norway	
6	Ellen Sofie Olsvik	Norway	
7	Outi Borgenström	Finland	
8	Karin Rabe	Sweden	
9	Irén Rostás	Hungary	
10	Kerstin Månsson	Sweden	
11	Ada Kuchařová	Czechoslovakia	
12	Frauke Sonderegger	Switzerland	
13	Dorthe Hansen	Denmark	
14	Ragnhild Bratberg	Norway	
