= 1979 World Orienteering Championships =

1979 edition of the World Orienteering Championships

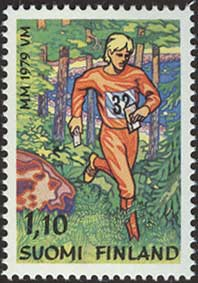
- Host city: Tampere
- Country: Finland
- Events: 4

The 1979 World Orienteering Championships, the 8th World Orienteering Championships, were held in Tampere, Finland, 2–4 September 1979.

The championships had four events; individual contests for men and women, and relays for men and women.

== Medalists ==
Event	Gold		Silver		Bronze	
Men's individual	Øyvin Thon (NOR)	1:36.07	Egil Johansen (NOR)	1:37.17	Tore Sagvolden (NOR)	1:37.27
Women's individual	Outi Borgenström (FIN)	59.13	Liisa Veijalainen (FIN)	59.47	Monica Andersson (SWE)	1:02.31
Men's relay	Sweden (SWE): Rolf Pettersson; Kjell Lauri; Lars Lönnkvist; Björn Rosendahl	4:12.12	Finland (FIN): Seppo Keskinarkaus; Hannu Kottonen; Risto Nuuros; Ari Anjala	4:27.37	Czechoslovakia (TCH): Petr Uher; Zdenek Lenhart; Jiri Tichanek; Jaroslav Kacmarcik	4:39.46
Women's relay	Finland (FIN): Leena Silvennoinen; Leena Salmenkylä; Liisa Veijalainen	3:00.13	Norway (NOR): Anne Berit Eid; Astrid Carlsson; Brit Volden	3:01.38	Sweden (SWE): Anna-Lena Axelsson; Karin Rabe; Monica Andersson	3:02.26

== Results ==
=== Men's individual ===
WOC 1979 – Individual – Men (15.1 km)
Rank	Competitor	Nation	Time
1	Øyvin Thon	Norway	1:36.07
2	Egil Johansen	Norway	1:37.17
3	Tore Sagvolden	Norway	1:37.27
4	Kjell Lauri	Sweden	1:38:54
5	Lars Lönnkvist	Sweden	1:40.28
6	Rolf Pettersson	Sweden	1:41.30
7	Risto Nuuros	Finland	1:42.01
8	Dieter Hulliger	Switzerland	1:42.26
9	Eystein Weltzien	Norway	1:44.03
10	Dieter Wolf	Switzerland	1:45.40
11	Seppo Keskinarkaus	Finland	
12	Jaroslav Kacmarcik	Czechoslovakia	
13	Hannu Kottonen	Finland	
14	Pavel Ditrych	Czechoslovakia	
15	Jörgen Mårtensson	Sweden	
16	Martin Howald	Switzerland	
17	Jiří Ticháček	Czechoslovakia	
18	Willi Müller	Switzerland	
19	Klaus Madsen	Denmark	
20	Ivan Kristensen	Denmark	

=== Women's individual ===
WOC 1979 – Individual – Women (8.3 km)
Rank	Competitor	Nation	Time
1	Outi Borgenström	Finland	59.13
2	Liisa Veijalainen	Finland	59.47
3	Monica Andersson	Sweden	1:02.31
4	Hanni Fries	Switzerland	1:02.32
5	Karin Rabe	Sweden	1:03.05
6	Anne Berit Eid	Norway	1:03.08
7	Carol McNeill	Great Britain	1:03.42
8	Karin Gunnarsson	Sweden	1:04.35
9	Annichen Kringstad	Sweden	1:04.38
10	Brit Volden	Norway	1:04.55
11	Lis Nielsen	Denmark	1:05.16
12	Irén Rostás	Hungary	1:06.33
