= Volden =

Volden is a Norwegian surname. Notable people with the surname include:

- Brit Volden (born 1960), Norwegian orienteer
- Lars Volden (born 1992), Norwegian ice hockey player

== See also ==
- Volden Group, Norwegian seafood company
- Volden, Aarhus, a street in Aarhus, Denmark
