= Urho Kujala =

Finnish orienteering competitor (born 1957)

Medal record

Men's orienteering

Representing Finland

World Championships
| Bronze medal – third place | 1978 Kongsberg | Relay |

Urho Kujala (born 18 May 1957 in Vampula) is a Finnish orienteering competitor. He received a bronze medal in the relay event at the 1978 World Orienteering Championships in Kongsberg, together with Jorma Karvonen, Simo Nurminen and Risto Nuuros.

== See also ==
- List of orienteers
- List of orienteering events
