= 1985 World Orienteering Championships =

1985 edition of the World Orienteering Championships

- Host city: Bendigo
- Country: Australia
- Events: 4

The 1985 World Orienteering Championships, the 11th World Orienteering Championships, were held in Bendigo, Australia, 4–6 September 1985.

The championships had four events; individual contests for men and women, and relays for men and women.

== Medalists ==
| Event | Gold | | Silver | | Bronze | |
|---|---|---|---|---|---|---|
| Men's individual | Kari Sallinen (FIN) | 1.28.08 | Tore Sagvolden (NOR) | 1.30.01 | Egil Iversen (NOR) | 1.30.42 |
| Women's individual | Annichen Kringstad-Svensson (SWE) | 54.14 | Brit Volden (NOR) | 55.07 | Christina Blomqvist (SWE) | 57.11 |
| Men's relay | Norway (NOR): Morten Berglia; Atle Hansen; Tore Sagvolden; Øyvin Thon | 3.52.44 | Sweden (SWE): Lars Palmqvist; Michael Wehlin; Kjell Lauri; Jörgen Mårtensson | 3.54.21 | Switzerland (SUI): Willi Müller; Martin Howald; Urs Flühmann; Alain Gafner | 4.03.33 |
| Women's relay | Sweden (SWE): Karin Rabe; Christina Blomqvist; Kerstin Månsson; Annichen Kringstad-Svensson | 3.01.21 | Norway (NOR): Ragnhild Bratberg; Hilde Tellesbø; Helle Johansen; Ellen Sofie Olsvik | 3.01.31 | Switzerland (SUI): Susanne Lüscher; Frauke Sonderegger; Brigitta Zürscher; Ruth Humbel | 3.21.31 |

== Results ==
=== Men's individual ===
WOC 1985 – Individual – Men (15.2 km)
| Rank | Competitor | Nation | Time |
|---|---|---|---|
| 1 | Kari Sallinen | Finland | 1:28:02 |
| 2 | Tore Sagvolden | Norway | |
| 3 | Egil Iversen | Norway | |
| 4 | Jörgen Mårtensson | Sweden | |
| 5 | Pekka Nikulainen | Finland | |
| 6 | Urs Flühmann | Switzerland | |
| 7 | Øyvin Thon | Norway | |
| 8 | Kjell Lauri | Sweden | |
| 9 | Morten Berglia | Norway | |
| 10 | Ted De St. Croix | Canada | |

=== Women's individual ===
WOC 1985 – Individual – Women (8.4 km)
| Rank | Competitor | Nation | Time |
|---|---|---|---|
| 1 | Annichen Kringstad | Sweden | 54:14 |
| 2 | Brit Volden | Norway | |
| 3 | Christina Blomqvist | Sweden | |
| 4 | Kerstin Månsson | Sweden | |
| 5 | Karin Rabe | Sweden | |
| 6 | Ada Kuchařová | Czechoslovakia | |
| 7 | Charlotte Thrane | Denmark | |
| 8 | Helle Johansen | Norway | |
| 9 | Heidrun Finke | Germany | |
| 10 | Ellen Sofie Olsvik | Norway | |
| 11 | Annariitta Kottonen | Finland | |
| 12 | Riitta Karjalainen | Finland | |
| 13 | Yvette Hague | Great Britain | |
| 14 | Ragnhild Bratberg | Norway | |
| 15 | Frauke Sonderegger | Switzerland | |
| 16 | Eva Bártová | Czechoslovakia | |
