= Toril Hallan =

Norwegian orienteer

Medal record

Representing Norway

Women's Ski-orienteering

World Championships
Gold medal – first place	1986 Batak, Bulgaria	Relay
Silver medal – second place	1988 Kuopio	Relay
Bronze medal – third place	1982 Aigen	Relay

Toril Hallan is a Norwegian ski-orienteering competitor.

She won a bronze medal in the relay event at the 1982 World Ski Orienteering Championships in Austria, together with Ranveig Narbuvold and Sidsel Owren. At the 1986 World Championships in Bulgaria she won the gold medal in the relay, together with Ragnhild Bratberg and Ellen Sofie Olsvik. In Finland in 1988 she won a silver medal, together with Anne Svingheim and Ragnhild Bratberg.
