= Kristina Tollefsen =

Norwegian orienteer

Medal record

Representing Norway

Women's Ski-orienteering

World Championships
Bronze medal – third place	1990 Skellefteå	Relay

Kristina Tollefsen is a Norwegian ski-orienteering competitor.

She won a bronze medal in the relay event at the 1990 World Ski Orienteering Championships in Sweden, together with Anne Svingheim and Ragnhild Bratberg. She placed 12th in the classic distance, and 14th in the short distance.
