= Astrid Carlson =

Norwegian orienteer (1954–2011)

Personal information
- Nationality: Norwegian
- Born: 1954
- Died: 10 February 2011 (aged 56–57)
- Occupation: Schoolteacher
- Awards: Brage Prize (1995)

Sport
- Sport: Orienteering
- Club: Røyken og Spikkestad
Medal record
Women's orienteering
Representing Norway
World Championships
Silver medal – second place	1979 Tampere	Relay

Astrid Carlson (1954 – 10 February 2011) was a Norwegian orienteering competitor who competed in the 1970s. She participated at the 1978 World Orienteering Championships in Kongsberg, where she placed 8th in the individual course. She won a silver medal in the relay at the 1979 World Orienteering Championships in Tampere, together with Anne Berit Eid and Brit Volden.

== National championships ==
Carlson became Norwegian champion (relay event) in 1975, 1977 and 1978 with her club Røyken og Spikkestad, and won an individual bronze medal in 1975.

== Personal life ==
Carlson resided in Buskerud and was a teacher by profession.

She was awarded the Brage Prize in 1995 for the textbook Humanbiologi. She died in February 2011.
