= Anne Svingheim =

Norwegian orienteer

Medal record

Representing Norway

Women's Ski-orienteering

World Championships
Silver medal – second place	1988 Kuopio	Relay
Bronze medal – third place	1990 Skellefteå	Relay

Anne Svingheim is a Norwegian ski-orienteering competitor.

She won a silver medal in the relay event at the 1988 World Ski Orienteering Championships in Finland, together with Toril Hallan and Ragnhild Bratberg. At the 1990 World Championships in Sweden she won a bronze medal in the relay together with Kristina Tollefsen and Ragnhild Bratberg.
