= Sidsel Owren =

Norwegian orienteer

Medal record

Representing Norway

Women's Ski-orienteering

World Championships
Bronze medal – third place	1982 Aigen	Relay

Sidsel Owren is a Norwegian ski-orienteering competitor.

She won a bronze medal in the relay event at the 1982 World Ski Orienteering Championships in Austria, together with Toril Hallan and Ranveig Narbuvold, and placed eleventh in the individual event.
