= Helle Johansen =

Norwegian orienteer

Medal record

Women's orienteering

Representing Norway

World Championships
Silver medal – second place	1985 Bendigo	Relay

Helle Johansen is a Norwegian orienteering competitor. She received a silver medal in the relay event at the 1985 World Orienteering Championships in Bendigo, together with Ragnhild Bratberg, Hilde Tellesbø and Ellen-Sofie Olsvik.

== National championships ==
Johansen became Norwegian champion (relay event) in 1986 with her club NTHI. She was Norwegian champion in night orienteering in 1984 and 1987.
