= Hilde Tellesbø =

Norwegian orienteer (born 1963)

Medal record

Women's orienteering

Representing Norway

World Championships
Silver medal – second place	1985 Bendigo	Relay

Hilde Tellesbø (born 1963) is a Norwegian orienteering competitor. She received a silver medal in the relay event at the 1985 World Orienteering Championships in Bendigo, together with Ragnhild Bratberg, Helle Johansen and Ellen-Sofie Olsvik.
