= Jorunn Teigen =

Norwegian orienteer (born 1961)

Medal record

Women's orienteering

Representing Norway

World Cup
Silver medal – second place	1986	WC Overall

Nordic Championships
Gold medal – first place	1984 Malangen	Relay
Gold medal – first place	1986 Åland	Relay
Silver medal – second place	1984 Malangen	Individual

Jorunn Teigen (born 20 Mary 1961) is a Norwegian orienteering competitor. She finished overall second in the first official Orienteering World Cup in 1986.

== World championships ==
She participated at the 1983 World Orienteering Championships, where she finished 5th in the individual event, and 4th in the relay event.

== World cup ==
Teigen finished second overall at the 1986 Orienteering World Cup, with a total score of 108 points (the four best results from eight events counted). She scored four points less than the winner Ellen Sofie Olsvik (112 points), while third ranked was Karin Rabe (101 points).

She also participated in the first unofficial World Cup in 1983, where she finished second overall, behind Brit Volden (counting the three best results from six events).

== National championships ==
Teigen was Norwegian champion in the long distance in 1986. She was Norwegian champion in the normal distance in 1989, and received the King's Cup, and finished second in 1984 and 1986.
