= 2015 Orienteering World Cup =

International orienteering competition

World Cup events
- Individual: 11

Men's World Cup
- 1st: Daniel Hubmann (SUI)
- 2nd: Matthias Kyburz (SUI)
- 3rd: Olav Lundanes (NOR)
- Most wins: Daniel Hubmann (SUI) (4)

Women's World Cup
- 1st: Tove Alexandersson (SWE)
- 2nd: Sara Lüscher (SUI)
- 3rd: Nadiya Volynska (UKR)
- Most wins: Tove Alexandersson (SWE) (3)

Team World Cup
- 1st: No team events held

The 2015 Orienteering World Cup was the 21st edition of the Orienteering World Cup. The 2015 Orienteering World Cup consisted of 11 events, all individual competitions. The events were located in Australia, Norway, Sweden, United Kingdom and Switzerland. The 2015 World Orienteering Championships in Inverness, Scotland, United Kingdom was included in the World Cup.

Daniel Hubmann of Switzerland won his second consecutive overall title in the men's World Cup, his sixth title in total. Tove Alexandersson of Sweden won her second overall title in the women's World Cup.

== Events ==
=== Men ===
No.	Venue	Distance	Date	Winner	Second	Third	Ref.
Round 1 - Australia
1	Tasmania, Australia	Sprint	3 January	(Switzerland) Matthias Kyburz	(Switzerland) Daniel Hubmann	(Sweden) Gustav Bergman	
2	Tasmania, Australia	Middle	8 January	(Switzerland) Daniel Hubmann	(Norway) Olav Lundanes	(Switzerland) Matthias Kyburz	
3	Tasmania, Australia	Long	13 May	(Switzerland) Matthias Kyburz	(Switzerland) Daniel Hubmann	(Sweden) Gustav Bergman	
Round 2 - Norway/Sweden
4	Halden, Norway	Long	4 June	(Switzerland) Matthias Kyburz	(France) Thierry Gueorgiou	(Sweden) Gustav Bergman	
5	Lysekil, Sweden	Sprint	6 June	Annulled due to problems with timing			
6	Uddevalla, Sweden	Middle	7 June	(France) Thierry Gueorgiou	(Sweden) William Lind	(Switzerland) Matthias Kyburz	
Round 3 - World Championships
7	Inverness, United Kingdom	Sprint (WOC)	2 August	(Sweden) Jonas Leandersson	(Switzerland) Martin Hubmann	(Sweden) Jerker Lysell	
8	Inverness, United Kingdom	Middle (WOC)	4 August	(Switzerland) Daniel Hubmann	(France) Lucas Basset	(Sweden) Olle Boström	
9	Inverness, United Kingdom	Long (WOC)	7 August	(France) Thierry Gueorgiou	(Switzerland) Daniel Hubmann	(Norway) Olav Lundanes	
Round 4 - Finals
10	Arosa, Switzerland	Long	2 October	(Switzerland) Daniel Hubmann	(Norway) Carl Godager Kaas	(Norway) Olav Lundanes	
11	Arosa, Switzerland	Middle	3 October	(Switzerland) Daniel Hubmann	(Ukraine) Ruslan Glibov	(Switzerland) Baptiste Rollier	

=== Women ===
No.	Venue	Distance	Date	Winner	Second	Third	Ref.
Round 1 - Australia
1	Tasmania, Australia	Sprint	3 January	(Sweden) Tove Alexandersson	(Switzerland) Judith Wyder	(Switzerland) Sara Lüscher	
2	Tasmania, Australia	Middle	8 January	(Sweden) Tove Alexandersson	(Norway) Mari Fasting	(Sweden) Maria Magnusson	
3	Tasmania, Australia	Long	10 January	(Sweden) Tove Alexandersson	(Switzerland) Sara Lüscher	(Sweden) Emma Johansson	
Round 2 - Norway/Sweden
4	Halden, Norway	Long	3 June	(Denmark) Ida Bobach	(Sweden) Tove Alexandersson	(Russia) Svetlana Mironova	
5	Lysekil, Sweden	Sprint	6 June	Annulled due to problems with timing			
6	Uddevalla, Sweden	Middle	7 June	(Sweden) Helena Jansson	(Ukraine) Nadiya Volynska	(Sweden) Emma Johansson	
Round 3 - World Championships
7	Inverness, United Kingdom	Sprint (WOC)	2 August	(Sweden) Tove Alexandersson	(Norway) Kamilla Olaussen	(Sweden) Karolin Ohlsson	
8	Inverness, United Kingdom	Middle (WOC)	4 August	(Sweden) Annika Billstam	(Finland) Merja Rantanen	(Sweden) Emma Johansson	
9	Inverness, United Kingdom	Long (WOC)	7 August	(Denmark) Ida Bobach	(Norway) Mari Fasting	(Russia) Svetlana Mironova	
Round 4 - Finals
10	Arosa, Switzerland	Long	2 October	(Norway) Anne Margrethe Hausken Nordberg	(Switzerland) Sabine Hauswirth	(Switzerland) Sara Lüscher	
11	Arosa, Switzerland	Middle	3 October	(United Kingdom) Catherine Taylor	(Ukraine) Nadiya Volynska	(Switzerland) Sara Lüscher	

== Points distribution ==
The 40 best runners in each event were awarded points. In the final race (WC 11), the runners were awarded a double number of points.

Rank	1	2	3	4	5	6	7	8	9	10	11	12	13	14	15	16	17	18	19	20	21	22	23	24	25	26	27	28	29	30	31	32	33	34	35	36	37	38	39	40
Points	100	80	60	50	45	40	37	35	33	31	30	29	28	27	26	25	24	23	22	21	20	19	18	17	16	15	14	13	12	11	10	9	8	7	6	5	4	3	2	1
Points Final (WC 11)	200	160	120	100	90	80	74	70	66	62	60	58	56	54	52	50	48	46	44	42	40	38	36	34	32	30	28	26	24	22	20	18	16	14	12	10	8	6	4	2

== Overall standings ==
This section shows the final standings after all 11 individual events.

=== Men ===
Rank	Athlete	Points
1	(Switzerland) Daniel Hubmann	790
2	(Switzerland) Matthias Kyburz	605
3	(Norway) Olav Lundanes	384
4	(Sweden) Gustav Bergman	353
5	(Norway) Magne Dæhli	322
6	(France) Thierry Gueorgiou	317
7	(Sweden) William Lind	311
8	(Ukraine) Ruslan Glibov	271
9	(Finland) Mårten Boström	249
10	(Ukraine) Oleksandr Kratov	240

=== Women ===
Rank	Athlete	Points
1	(Sweden) Tove Alexandersson	540
2	(Switzerland) Sara Lüscher	487
3	(Ukraine) Nadiya Volynska	459
4	(Denmark) Ida Bobach	421
5	(Sweden) Emma Johansson	362
6	(Switzerland) Sabine Hauswirth	319
7	(United Kingdom) Catherine Taylor	311
8	(Switzerland) Judith Wyder	301
9	(Norway) Anne Margrethe Hausken	279
10	(Switzerland) Julia Gross	275

== Achievements ==
Only individual competitions.
