= Alain Gafner =

Swiss orienteering competitor

Medal record

Men's orienteering

Representing Switzerland

World Championships
Bronze medal – third place	1985 Bendigo	Relay

Alain Gafner is a Swiss orienteering competitor. He participated at the 1985 World Orienteering Championships in Bendigo, where he won a bronze medal in the relay, together with Willi Müller, Urs Flühmann and Martin Howald.
