= Olle Nåbo =

Swedish orienteering competitor

Medal record

Men's orienteering

Representing Sweden

World Championships
Silver medal – second place	1978 Kongsberg	Relay

Olle Nåbo (born 12 April 1956) is a Swedish orienteering competitor. He received a silver medal in the relay event at the 1978 World Orienteering Championships in Kongsberg, together with Rolf Pettersson, Lars Lönnkvist and Kjell Lauri, and placed fifth in the individual event. He won the Jukola relay in 1980 and 1982.
