= Petr Uher =

Medal record

Men's orienteering

Representing Czechoslovakia

World Championships
| Bronze medal – third place | 1979 Tampere | Relay |

Petr Uher is an orienteering competitor who competed for Czechoslovakia. At the 1979 World Orienteering Championships in Tampere he won a bronze medal in the relay, together with Zdenek Lenhart, Jiri Tichacek and Jaroslav Kacmarcik.
