= Eva Moberg (orienteer) =

Swedish orienteering competitor

Medal record

Women's orienteering

Representing Sweden

World Championships
Silver medal – second place	1978 Kongsberg	Relay

Eva Moberg (born 16 April 1954) is a Swedish orienteering competitor. She received a silver medal in the relay event at the 1978 World Orienteering Championships in Kongsberg, together with Karin Rabe and Kristin Cullman.
