= Jiří Ticháček =

Medal record

Men's orienteering

Representing Czechoslovakia

World Championships
Bronze medal – third place	1979 Tampere	Relay

Jiri Ticháček (born 5 January 1951) is a Czech orienteering competitor who competed for Czechoslovakia. At the 1979 World Orienteering Championships in Tampere, he won a bronze medal in the relay, together with Petr Uher, Zdeněk Lenhart and Jaroslav Kačmarčík.

In 2016, he was inducted into the Czech Orienteering Hall of Fame.
