= Josef Pollák =

Czechoslovak orienteer (born 1960)

Medal record

Men's orienteering

Representing Czechoslovakia

World Championships
Silver medal – second place	1983 Zalaegerszeg	Relay

Josef Pollák (born 23 March 1960) is an orienteering competitor who competed for Czechoslovakia. At the 1983 World Orienteering Championships in Zalaegerszeg he won a silver medal in the relay, together with Vlastimil Uchytil, Pavel Ditrych and Jaroslav Kacmarcik.
