= Anna-Lena Axelsson =

Swedish orienteering competitor

Personal information
- Nationality: Swedish
- Born: 1956 (age 69–70)

Sport
- Sport: Orienteering
Medal record
Women's orienteering
Representing Sweden
World Championships
| Bronze medal – third place | 1979 Tampere | Relay |

Anna-Lena Axelsson (born 1956) is a Swedish orienteering competitor. She won a bronze medal in the relay event at the 1979 World Orienteering Championships in Tampere, together with Karin Rabe and Monica Andersson.
