= 1978 World Orienteering Championships =

1978 edition of the World Orienteering Championships

- Host city: Kongsberg
- Country: Norway
- Events: 4

The 1978 World Orienteering Championships, the 7th World Orienteering Championships, were held in Kongsberg, Norway, 15–17 September 1978.

The championships had four events; individual contests for men and women, and relays for men and women.

== Medalists ==
Event	Gold		Silver		Bronze	
Men's individual	Egil Johansen (NOR)	1:31:44	Risto Nuuros (FIN)	1:32:52	Simo Nurminen (FIN)	1:34:00
Women's individual	Anne Berit Eid (NOR)	1:01:40	Liisa Veijalainen (FIN)	1:01:42	Wenche Jacobsen (NOR)	1:02:42
Men's relay	Norway (NOR): Jan Fjærestad; Svein Jacobsen; Egil Johansen; Eystein Weltzien	3:55:33	Sweden (SWE): Rolf Pettersson; Lars Lönnkvist; Kjell Lauri; Olle Nåbo	4:04:05	Finland (FIN): Urho Kujala; Jorma Karvonen; Simo Nurminen; Risto Nuuros	4:16:27
Women's relay	Finland (FIN): Outi Borgenström; Marita Ruoho; Liisa Veijalainen	2:26:48	Sweden (SWE): Eva Moberg; Karin Rabe; Kristin Cullman	2:26:52	Switzerland (SUI): Ruth Baumberger; Ruth Humbel; Hanni Fries	2:38:43

== Results ==
=== Men's individual ===
WOC 1978 – Individual – Men (15.7 km)
Rank	Competitor	Nation	Time
1	Egil Johansen	Norway	1:31:44
2	Risto Nuuros	Finland	
3	Simo Nurminen	Finland	
4	Eystein Weltzien	Norway	
5	Olle Nåbo	Sweden	
6	Jan Fjærestad	Norway	
7	Lars Lönnkvist	Sweden	
8	Jörgen Mårtensson	Sweden	
9	Jorma Karvonen	Finland	
10	Dieter Wolf	Switzerland	

=== Women's individual ===
WOC 1978 – Individual – Women (8.6 km)
Rank	Competitor	Nation	Time
1	Anne Berit Eid	Norway	1:01:40
2	Liisa Veijalainen	Finland	1:01:42
3	Wenche Jacobsen	Norway	1:02:42
4	Kristin Cullman	Sweden	1:03:06
5	Karin Rabe	Sweden	1:05:10
6	Outi Borgenström	Finland	1:06:06
7	Ruth Baumberger	Switzerland	
8	Astrid Carlsson	Norway	
9	Monica Andersson	Sweden	
10	Bibbi Siljeblad-Fahlen	Sweden	
