= Martin Howald =

Swiss orienteering competitor

Sport
- Sport: Orienteering
Medal record
Men's orienteering
Representing Switzerland
World Championships
| Bronze medal – third place | 1985 Bendigo | Relay |

Martin Howald is a Swiss orienteering competitor. He participated at the 1985 World Orienteering Championships in Bendigo, where he won a bronze medal in the team relay, together with Willi Müller, Urs Flühmann and Alain Gafner. At the 1981 World Orienteering Championships he placed 9th in the individual contest, and fifth with the Swiss relay team.
