= Heidi Arnesen =

Norwegian orienteer

Medal record

Women's orienteering

Representing Norway

World Championships
| Silver medal – second place | 1991 Mariánské Lázně | Relay |

Heidi Arnesen is a Norwegian orienteering competitor.

== Biography ==
Arnesen received a silver medal in the relay event at the 1991 World Orienteering Championships in Mariánské Lázně, together with Hanne Sandstad, Ragnhild Bratberg and Ragnhild Bente Andersen.

== National championships ==
Arnesen became Norwegian champion (relay event) in 1985 with her club OL Trollelg. She was Norwegian junior champion in night orienteering in 1986.
