= Jaroslav Kačmarčík =

Czechoslovak orienteer (born 1954)

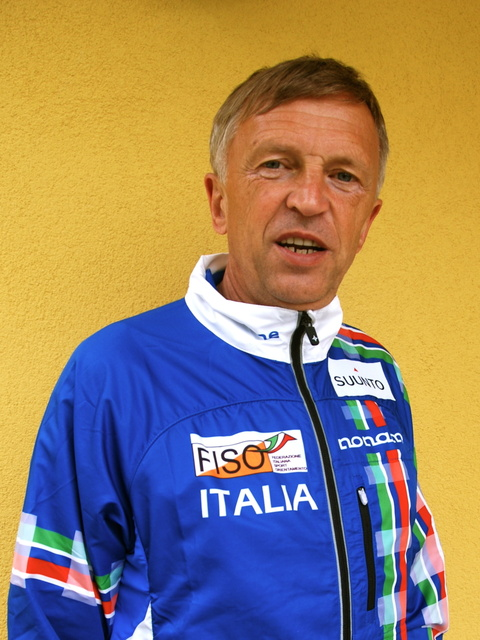
- Kačmarčík with FISO uniform (2011)

Medal record

Men's orienteering

Representing Czechoslovakia

World Championships
Silver medal – second place	1983 Zalaegerszeg	Relay
Bronze medal – third place	1979 Tampere	Relay

Jaroslav Kačmarčík (born 3 March 1954) is an orienteering competitor who competed for Czechoslovakia. At the 1979 World Orienteering Championships in Tampere he won a bronze medal in the relay, together with Petr Uher, Zdeněk Lenhart and Jiří Ticháček.

At the 1981 World Orienteering Championships he placed 7th in the individual contest, and fourth in the relay with the Czechoslovak team.

In 1983 in Zalaegerszeg he placed 6th in the individual contest, and won a silver medal in the relay, together with Vlastimil Uchytil, Pavel Ditrych and Josef Pollák.

Kačmarčík is a Park World Tour council member from year 1996. Member of International Orienteering Federation - Global Development Commission
