= Wenche Jacobsen =

Norwegian orienteer (born 1954)

Medal record

Women's orienteering

Representing Norway

World Championships
| Bronze medal – third place | 1978 Kongsberg | Individual |

Wenche Jacobsen (born 28 July 1954) is a Norwegian orienteering competitor who competed internationally. Her achievements included winning a bronze medal at the world championships in 1978, and she was part of the Norwegian relay team at the world championships in 1976 and 1978, both times placing fourth.

== Career ==
=== International ===
Jacobsen competed at the 1976 World Orienteering Championships in Aviemore, where she placed sixth in the individual course. She was also part of the Norwegian relay team, which placed fourth. She won a bronze medal in the individual event at the 1978 World Orienteering Championships in Kongsberg, behind Anne Berit Eid and Liisa Veijalainen. She was also part of the relay team at the 1978 championships, which placed fourth, two seconds behind the Swiss bronze medalists.

=== National championships ===
Jacobsen became Norwegian champion in orienteering in 1977, in the individual event (classical distance), and was awarded the King's Cup. In 1978 she was Norwegian orienteering champion in the ultra long distance.

== Personal life ==
Jacobsen lived together with cross-country skier Ivar Formo for fifteen years.
