= Hanne Sandstad =

Norwegian orienteer (born 1970)

Personal information
- Nationality: Norwegian
- Born: 1970 (age 55–56)

Sport
- Sport: Orienteering
- Club: NTHI
Medal record
Women's orienteering
Representing Norway
World Championships
Gold medal – first place	1999 Inverness	Relay
Silver medal – second place	1991 Marianske Lazne	Relay
Silver medal – second place	1997 Grimstad	Short
Silver medal – second place	1997 Grimstad	Relay
Bronze medal – third place	1997 Grimstad	Classic
Junior World Championships
Gold medal – first place	1990 Älvsbyn	Relay

Hanne Sandstad (born 1970) is a Norwegian orienteering competitor and World Champion.

== Career ==
At the 1991 World Orienteering Championships she won a silver medal in the relay, together with Heidi Arnesen, Ragnhild Bratberg and Ragnhild Bente Andersen. At the 1997 World Orienteering Championships she won silver medals in the short distance and the relay, and a bronze medal in the classic distance. She became World Champion in the relay in 1999, together with Birgitte Husebye, Elisabeth Ingvaldsen and Hanne Staff.

She was awarded the Kongepokal (King's Cup) trophy at the national championships twice, in 1995 and 1997.

She represented the sports club NTHI.
