= Susanne Lüscher =

Swiss orienteering competitor

Medal record

Women's orienteering

Representing Switzerland

World Championships
Bronze medal – third place	1985 Bendigo	Relay

Susanne Lüscher is a Swiss orienteering competitor. She won a bronze medal in the relay at the 1985 World Orienteering Championships in Bendigo, Victoria.
