= Ragnhild Bente Andersen =

Norwegian orienteering competitor

Personal information
- Born: 31 March 1965 (age 61) Halden, Norwsy

Sport
- Sport: Orienteering
Medal record
Women's orienteering
Representing Norway
World Championships
Gold medal – first place	1987 Gérardmer	Relay
Silver medal – second place	1991 Marianske Lazne	Relay
World Cup
Gold medal – first place	1990	WC Overall

Ragnhild Bente Andersen (born 31 March 1965) is a Norwegian orienteering competitor and World champion. She won a gold medal in relay at the 1987 World Orienteering Championships, together with Bratberg, Olsvik and Volden. She received a silver medal in relay in 1991, together with Sandstad, Arnesen and Bratberg.

Andersen won the overall Orienteering World Cup in 1990.
