= Monica Andersson =

Swedish orienteering competitor

Medal record

Women's orienteering

Representing Sweden

World Championships
Gold medal – first place	1974 Silkeborg	Relay
Bronze medal – third place	1979 Tampere	Individual
Bronze medal – third place	1979 Tampere	Relay

Monica Andersson (born 3 September 1953) is a Swedish orienteering competitor. She is Relay World Champion from 1974, as a member of the Swedish winning team (with Birgitta Larsson and Kristin Cullman). At the 1979 World Championships she won an individual bronze medal as well as a bronze medal in the relay (with Anna-Lena Axelsson and Karin Rabe).
