= Christina Blomqvist =

Swedish orienteering competitor

Medal record

Women's orienteering

Representing Sweden

World Championships
Gold medal – first place	1985 Bendigo	Relay
Gold medal – first place	1991 Mariánské Lázně	Relay
Silver medal – second place	1991 Mariánské Lázně	Classic
Bronze medal – third place	1985 Bendigo	Individual

Christina Blomqvist (born 22 October 1964) is a Swedish orienteering competitor. She is two times Relay World Champion as a member of the Swedish winning team in 1985 and 1991. She obtained silver in the Classic distance World Championship in 1991, and bronze in the 1985 Individual World Championship.
