= Kerstin Månsson =

Swedish orienteering competitor

Medal record

Women's orienteering

Representing Sweden

World Championships
Gold medal – first place	1983 Zalaegerszeg	Relay
Gold medal – first place	1985 Bendigo	Relay

Kerstin Månsson (born 31 August 1960) is a Swedish orienteering competitor. She is two times Relay World Champion as a member of the Swedish winning team in 1983 and 1985.
