= Heli Jukkola =

Finnish orienteering competitor

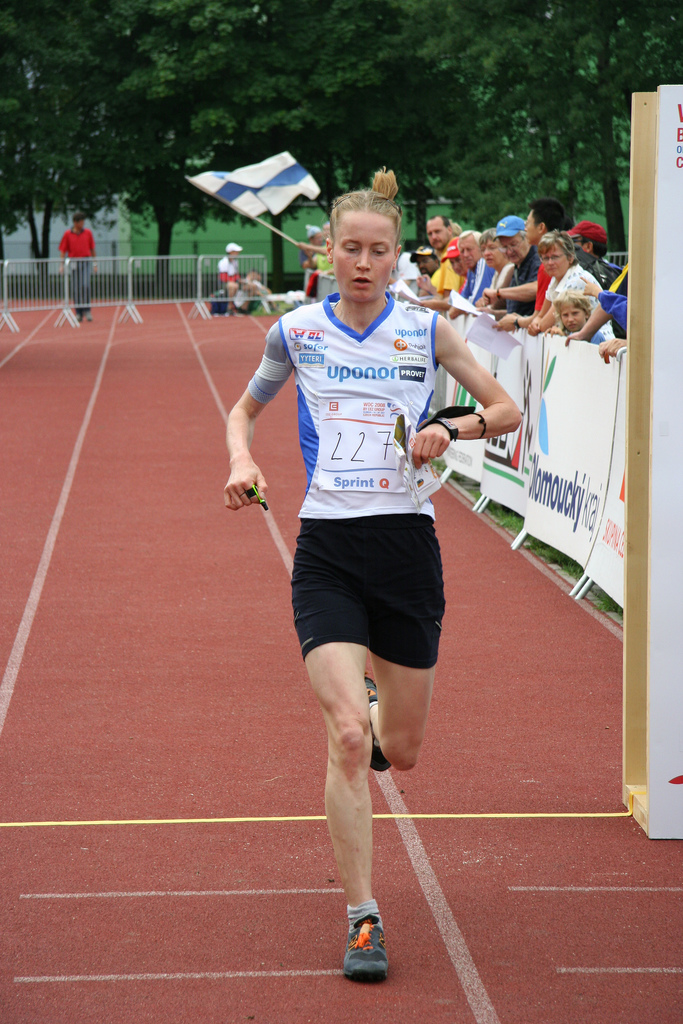
- Jukkola in 2008

Medal record

Women's orienteering

Representing Finland

World Championships
Gold medal – first place	2006 Aarhus	Relay
Gold medal – first place	2007 Kyiv	Long
Gold medal – first place	2007 Kyiv	Relay
Silver medal – second place	2004 Västerås	Relay
Silver medal – second place	2005 Aichi	Long
Silver medal – second place	2007 Kyiv	Middle
Bronze medal – third place	2003 Rapperswil/Jona	Middle
Bronze medal – third place	2004 Västerås	Middle

Junior World Championships
Gold medal – first place	1998 Reims	Relay
Bronze medal – third place	1997 Leopoldsburg	Middle

Heli Jukkola (born 26 November 1979 in Noormarkku) is a Finnish orienteering competitor. She won the Long Distance World Orienteering Championships in 2007, and achieved second place in 2005. In the Middle Distance category, she finished second in 2007 and third in both 2003 and 2004. Jukkola is a two-time Relay World Champion team member, winning in 2006 and 2007 with the Finnish team. She also earned a silver medal in 2004.

== See also ==
- Finnish orienteers
- List of orienteers
- List of orienteering events
