= Pavel Ditrych =

Czechoslovak orienteer

Medal record

Men's orienteering

Representing Czechoslovakia

World Championships
Silver medal – second place	1983 Zalaegerszeg	Relay

Pavel Ditrych is an orienteering competitor who competed for Czechoslovakia. At the 1983 World Orienteering Championships in Zalaegerszeg he won a silver medal in the relay, together with Vlastimil Uchytil, Josef Pollák and Jaroslav Kacmarcik.
