= Cecilia Nilsson (orienteer) =

Swedish orienteering competitor

Sport
- Sport: Orienteering
Medal record
Women's orienteering
Representing Sweden
World Championships
Gold medal – first place	1997 Grimstad	Relay
Silver medal – second place	2001 Tampere	Relay

Cecilia Nilsson (born 29 April 1966) is a Swedish orienteering competitor. She is Relay World Champion from 1997, as a member of the Swedish winning team. She also has a silver medal from 2001.
