= Irén Rostás =

Hungarian orienteering competitor

Medal record

Women's orienteering

Representing Hungary

World Championships
Bronze medal – third place	1976 Aviemore	Relay

Irén Rostás is a Hungarian orienteering competitor. At the 1976 World Orienteering Championships in Aviemore she received a bronze medal in the relay with the Hungarian team (with Magda Kovács and Sarolta Monspart). In 1979 she finished 12th in the individual event, and in 1983 she finished 9th in the individual and 6th in relay event.
