= Marie-Luce Romanens =

Swiss orienteer

Medal record

Women's orienteering

Representing Switzerland

World Championships
Gold medal – first place	1995 Detmold	Short
Silver medal – second place	2003 Rapperswil-Jona	Sprint
Bronze medal – third place	1997 Grimstad	Short
Bronze medal – third place	1997 Grimstad	Relay

Junior World Championships
Gold medal – first place	1993 Kastelruth	Relay

Nordic Championships
Gold medal – first place	2003 Flen	Sprint

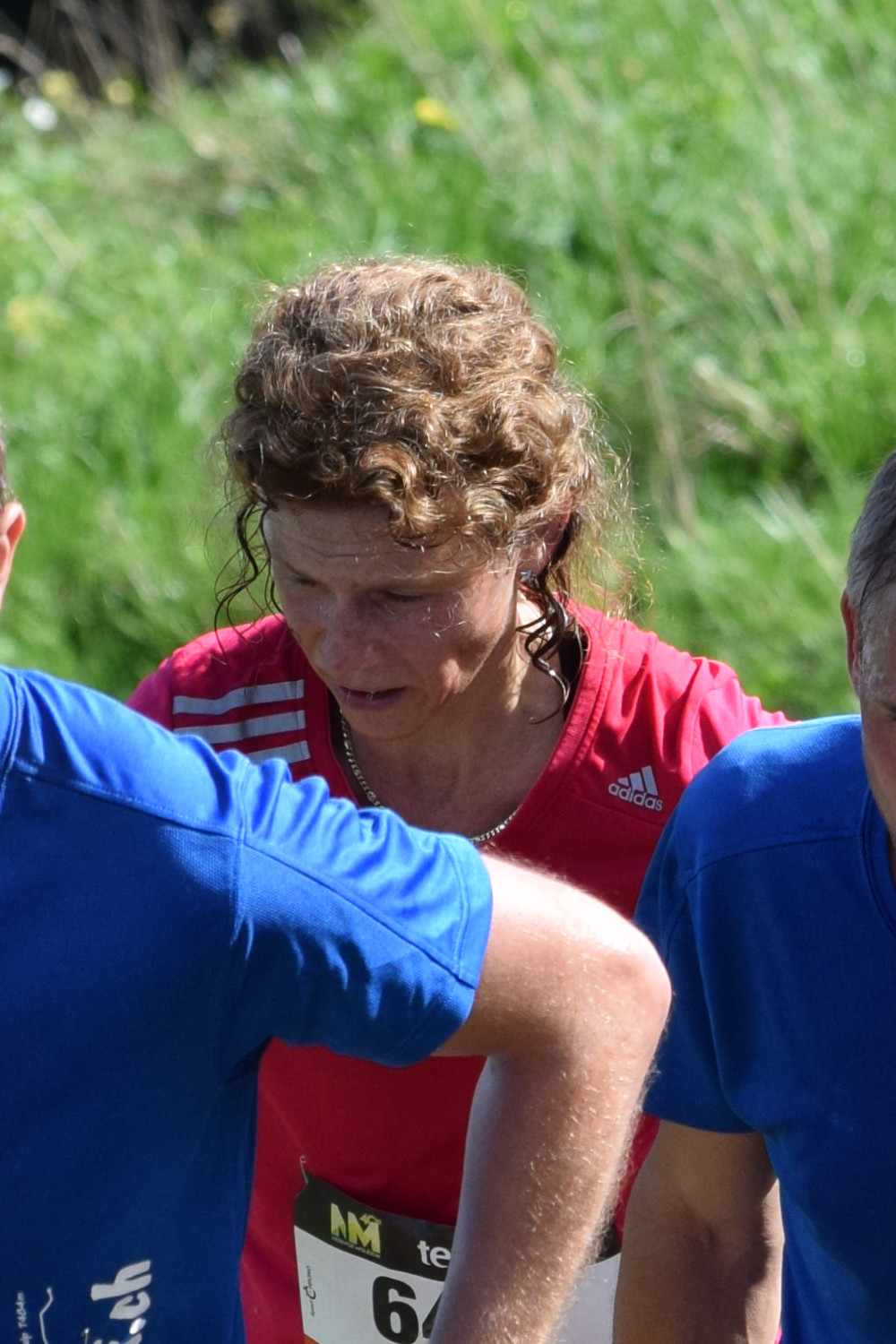
Marie-Luce Romanens

Marie-Luce Romanens (born 19 January 1973) is a Swiss orienteering competitor and long-distance runner. She won the 1995 Short distance World Orienteering Championships. This was the first individual Swiss gold medal in the World Orienteering Championships. She also earned a silver medal in the 2003 Sprint Championships, and a Relay bronze medal from the 1997 World Championships.

In 2001, she won the mountain race Jungfrau Marathon running from Interlaken to Kleine Scheidegg, a full marathon distance and 1823 meter climb, setting record for women (3:21:03). Her personal record on ordinary marathon is 2:35:54.

Marie-Luce Romanens finished her running career in 2003 due to achilles problems, and settled in Villars-sur-Glâne as a biology and chemistry teacher.
