= Sara Lüscher =

Swiss orienteering competitor

Medal record

Women's orienteering

Representing Switzerland

World Championships
Gold medal – first place	2014 Trentino-Veneto	Relay
Bronze medal – third place	2013 Vuokatti	Relay

World Cup
Silver medal – second place	2015	WC Overall

World Games
Gold medal – first place	2013 Cali	Relay

Sara Lüscher (born 1986) is a Swiss orienteering competitor. She competed at the 2013 World Orienteering Championships, and won a bronze medal in the relay with the Swiss team, behind Norway and Finland. The next year she won gold in the relay with Sabine Hauswirth and Judith Wyder. She runs for Kalevan Rasti in club competitions.
