= Paula Haapakoski =

Finnish orienteering competitor

Medal record

Women's orienteering

Representing Finland

World Championships
Gold medal – first place	2006 Aarhus	Relay
Gold medal – first place	2007 Kiev	Relay

Paula Haapakoski (born 3 February 1977) is a Finnish orienteering competitor. She is two times Relay World Champion, from 2006 and 2007, as member of the Finnish winning teams in the World Orienteering Championships.

== See also ==
- Finnish orienteers
- List of orienteers
- List of orienteering events
