= Willi Müller =

Swiss orienteering competitor

Medal record

Men's orienteering

Representing Switzerland

World Championships
Bronze medal – third place	1985 Bendigo	Relay

Willi Müller is a Swiss orienteering competitor who participated in five World Orienteering Championships in the 1970s and 1980s. He won a bronze medal with the Swiss relay team at the 1985 World Orienteering Championships.

== Career ==
Müller competed at the 1978 World Championships in Kongsberg, where he placed 16th in the individual course and fourth in the relay with the Swiss team. At the 1979 World Championships in Tampere he placed 18th individually and again fourth in the relay. He competed on the Swiss relay team at the World Championships in Thun in 1981, where the team placed fifth. At the 1983 World Championships in Zalaegerszeg he placed tenth in the individual contest, and fourth in the relay. At the 1985 World Championships in Bendigo, he participated on the Swiss team, which won the bronze medal.
