= Dorthe Hansen =

Danish orienteering competitor

Medal record

Women's orienteering

Representing Denmark

World Championships
| Bronze medal – third place | 1983 Zalaegerszeg | Relay |

Dorthe Hansen is a Danish orienteering competitor. She received a bronze medal in the relay event at the 1983 World Orienteering Championships in Zalaegerszeg, together with Mette Filskov, Hanne Birke and Karin Jexner, and finished 13th in the individual event.

== See also ==
- List of orienteers
- List of orienteering events
