= Simo Nurminen =

Finnish orienteering competitor

Medal record

Men's orienteering

Representing Finland

World Championships
Bronze medal – third place	1978 Kongsberg	Individual
Bronze medal – third place	1978 Kongsberg	Relay

Simo Nurminen (born 2 January 1949) is a Finnish orienteering competitor. He received two bronze medals at the 1978 World Orienteering Championships in Kongsberg, one in the individual contest and one in the relay with the Finnish team.

== See also ==
- Finnish orienteers
- List of orienteers
- List of orienteering events
