= Isia Basset =

French orienteering competitor (born 1993)

Personal information
- Born: 20 September 1993 (age 32) Lyon, France

Sport
- Sport: Orienteering
- Club: ASUL Sports Nature (FRA); IFK Goteborg (SWE)
Medal record
Women's orienteering
Representing France
World Championships
Bronze medal – third place	2018 Latvia	Middle

Isia Basset (born 20 September 1993) is a French orienteering competitor. She was born in Lyon. She won a bronze medal in the middle distance at the 2018 World Orienteering Championships in Latvia, behind Natalia Gemperle and Marika Teini. This was Basset's first international championships medal in her career, and her 2018 result was the first French medal in women's classes in the history of World Orienteering Championships.

Basset competed at the 2015, 2016 and 2017 World Orienteering Championships, and at the 2014, 2016 and 2018 European Orienteering Championships.
