= Volden, Aarhus =

Street in Aarhus, Denmark

Volden
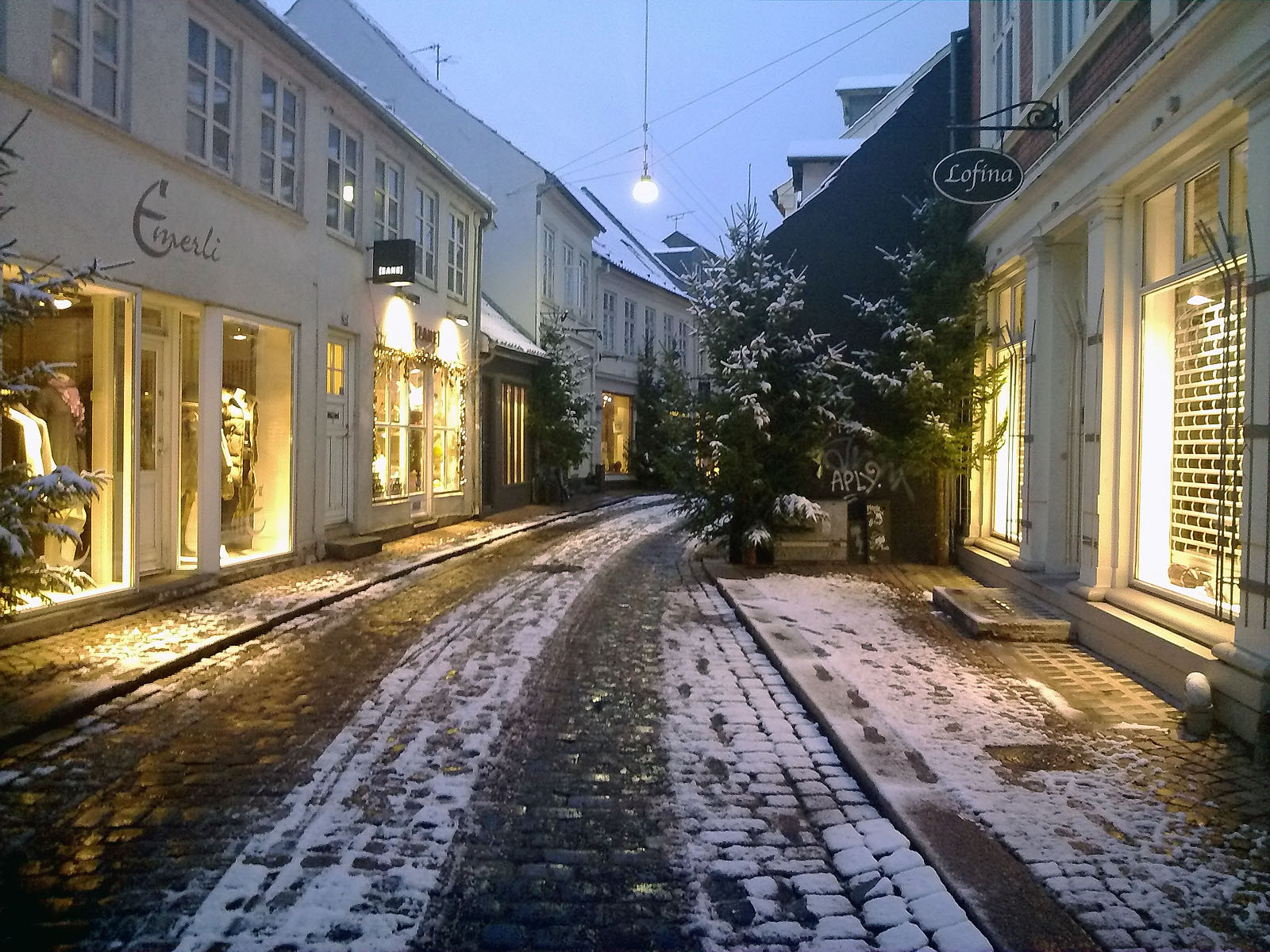
- Volden
- Interactive map of Volden
- Length: 180 m (590 ft)
- Location: Latin Quarter, Aarhus, Denmark
- Postal code: 8000
- Coordinates: 56°09′29.9″N 10°12′31.4″E

Volden (Lit. The Rampart) is a 180 meters long street in Aarhus, Denmark, situated in the historic Latin Quarter neighborhood. Volden runs from south to north from Store Torv to Graven and intersects Rosensgade roughly in the middle. Volden was created some time before year 1500 on and in the westernmost rampart used to defend the early Viking settlement. It is one of the oldest streets in the city and used to mark the western city limits. Volden is fairly narrow and is a pedestrianized street with cars forbidden access.

== History ==
The early Viking settlement was defended by moats and ramparts to the north, west and south. During the Middle Ages the city grew beyond the boundaries marked by these defenses and at the same time advents in warfare had made such structures less useful for defense. Some time before 1500 the ramparts and moats were dismantled and the street Volden was established on the former westernmost rampart. The street Badstuegade runs parallel to Volden to the west and archaeological excavations have shown evidence of a former moat and the foundations of an old city gate by the building Borgporten (Lit. Castle Gate). It is believed the surplus earth from the rampart was used to fill in the moat Badstuegade was established on.

Until 1867 the southern section of Volden, nearest Store Torv, was called Pustervig which is a common name known from other Danish cities. The word "puz" means water-filled hole or mud-pit so some theories speculate that the area may have been swampy. Another theory is that it is related to blacksmiths which at the time were called kulpustere (coal-blowers) for their use of bellows. Additionally, blacksmiths in medieval towns tended to be located at the outskirts or by open areas to protect thatched housing from fire and embers. The building on the corner of Volden and Rosensgade was called smedegården (smith's house) until 1562 and was owned by the blacksmiths' guild. The name pustervig can then best be translated as smedegade (Smith street) and it was likely where blacksmiths plied their trade in the Middle Ages.

== Gallery ==
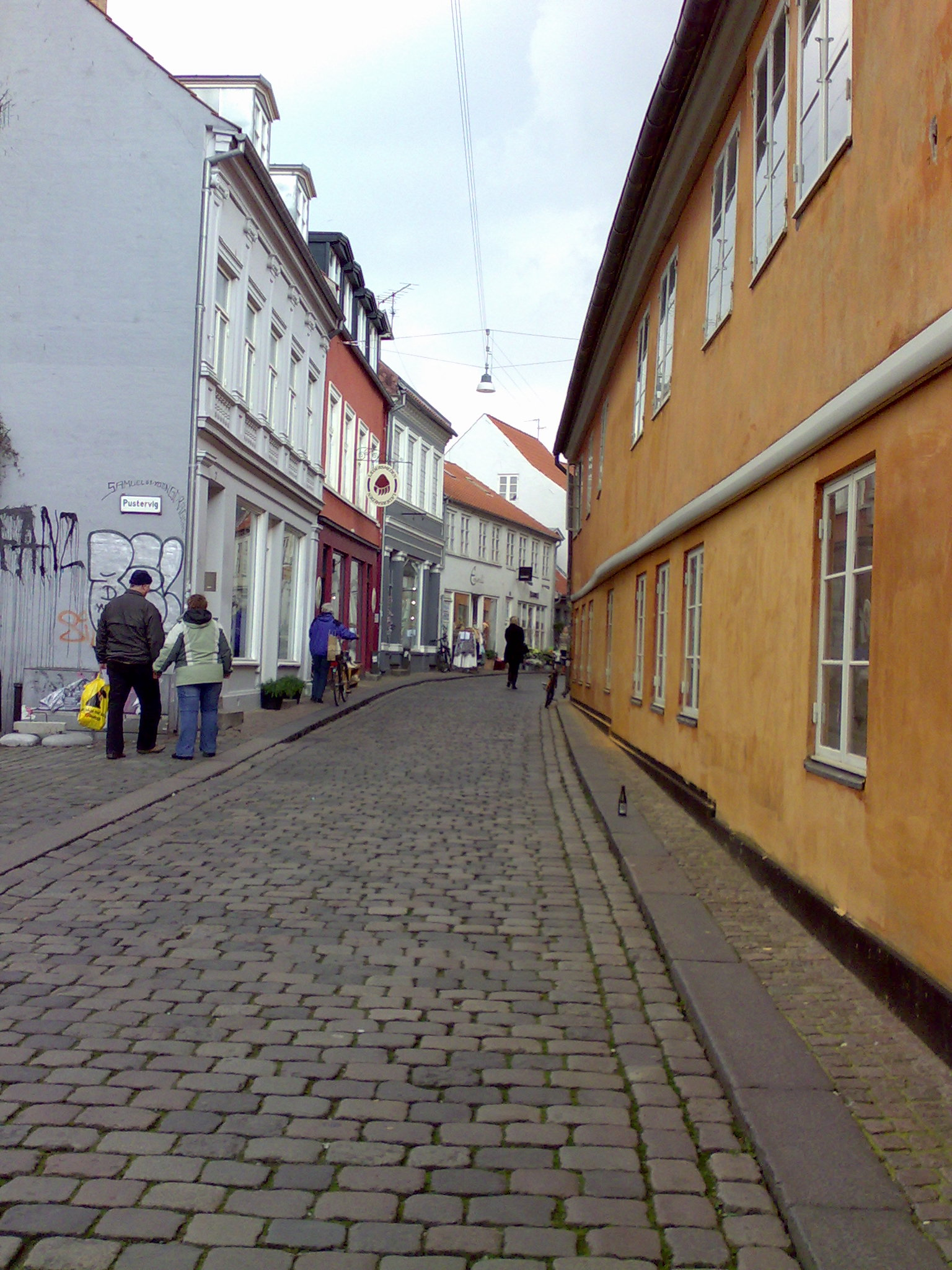

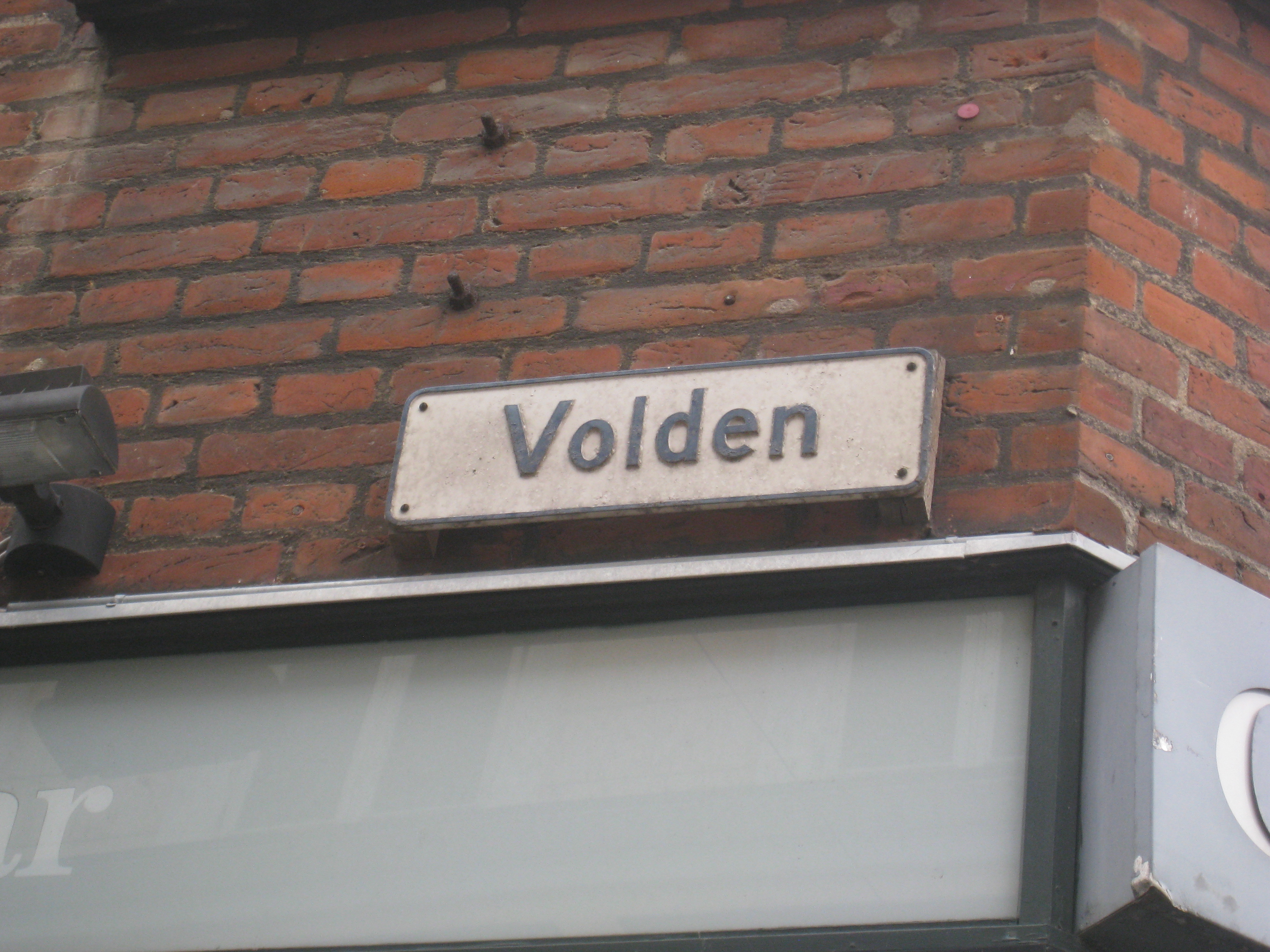

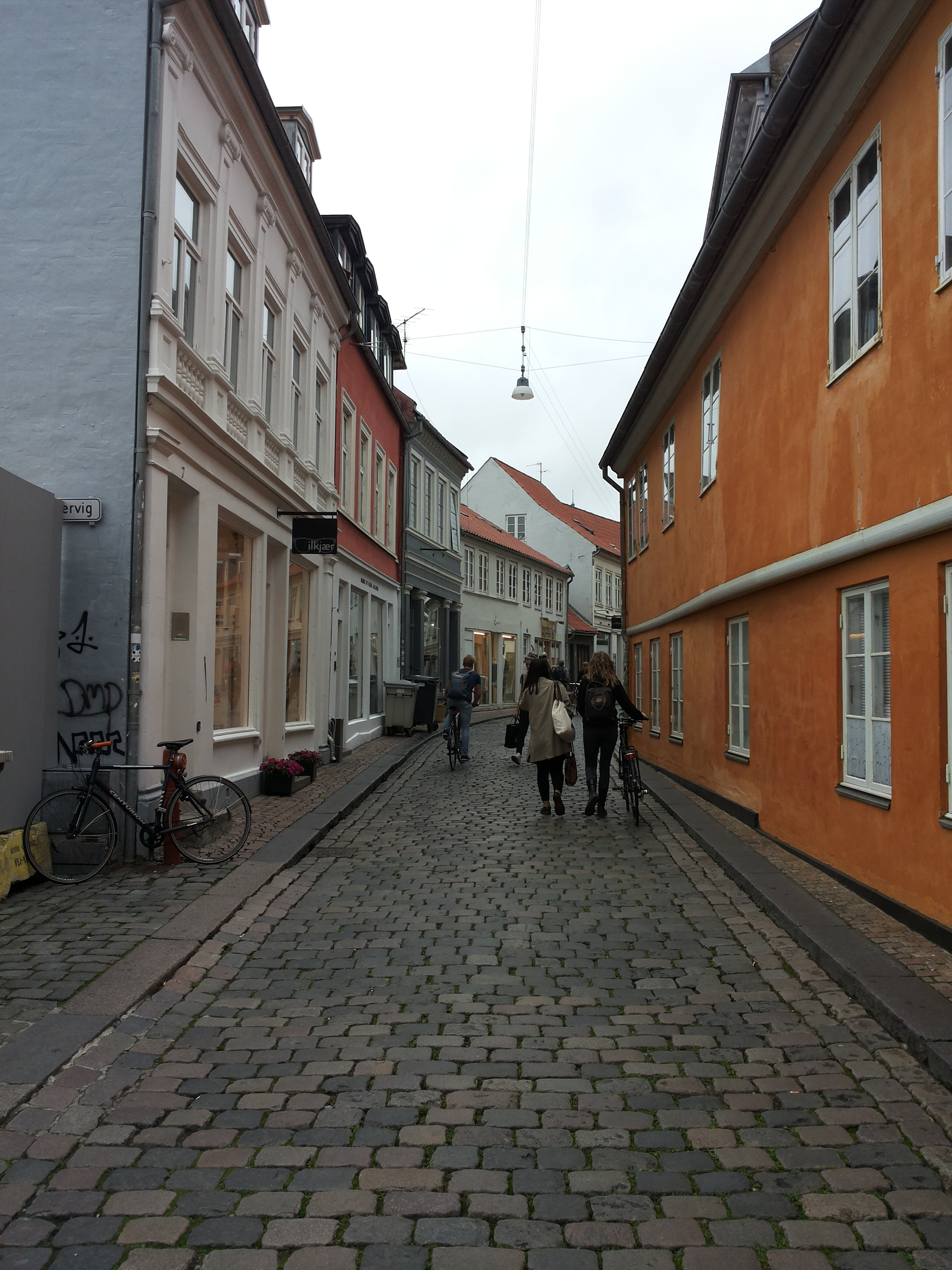

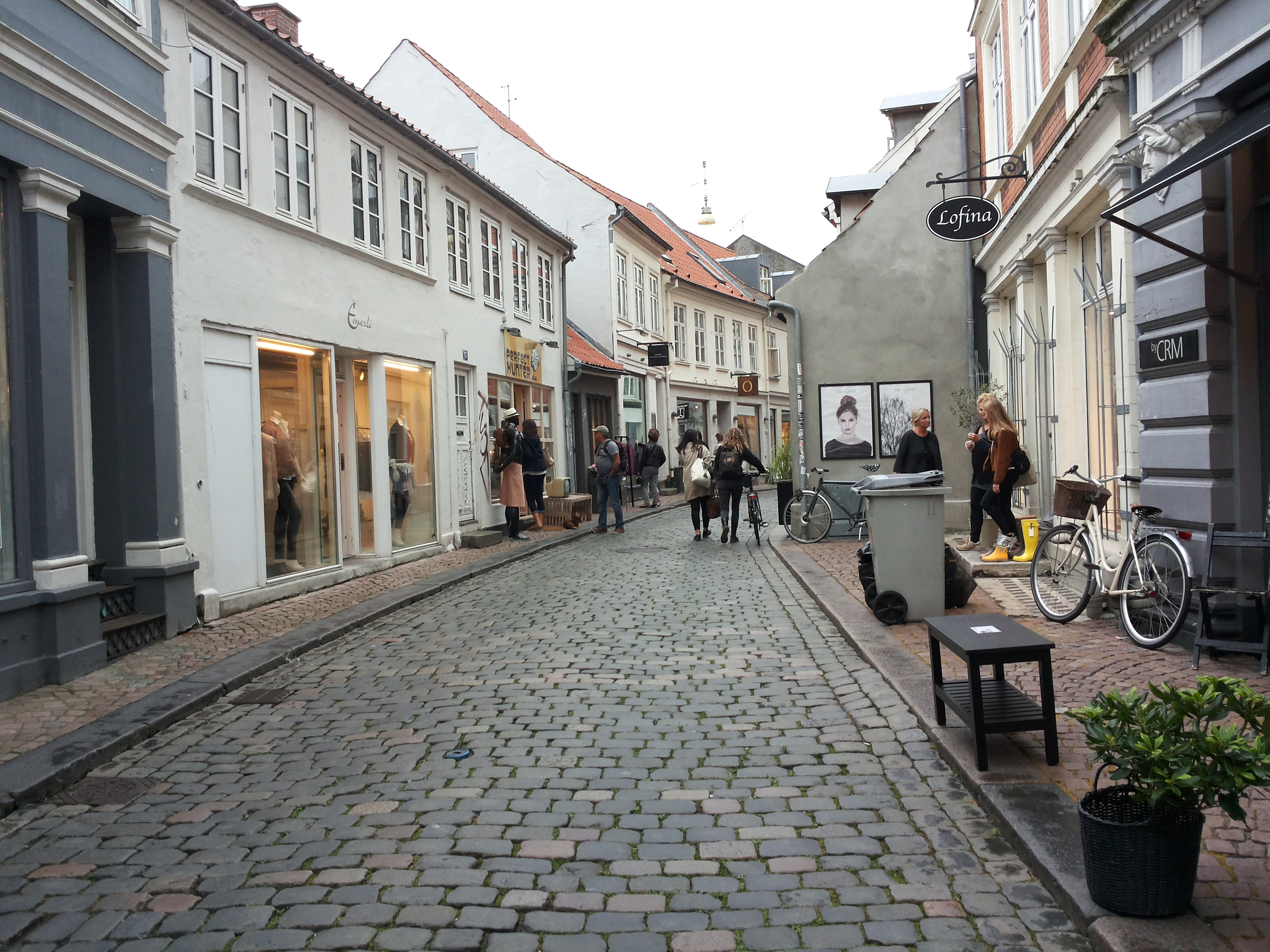

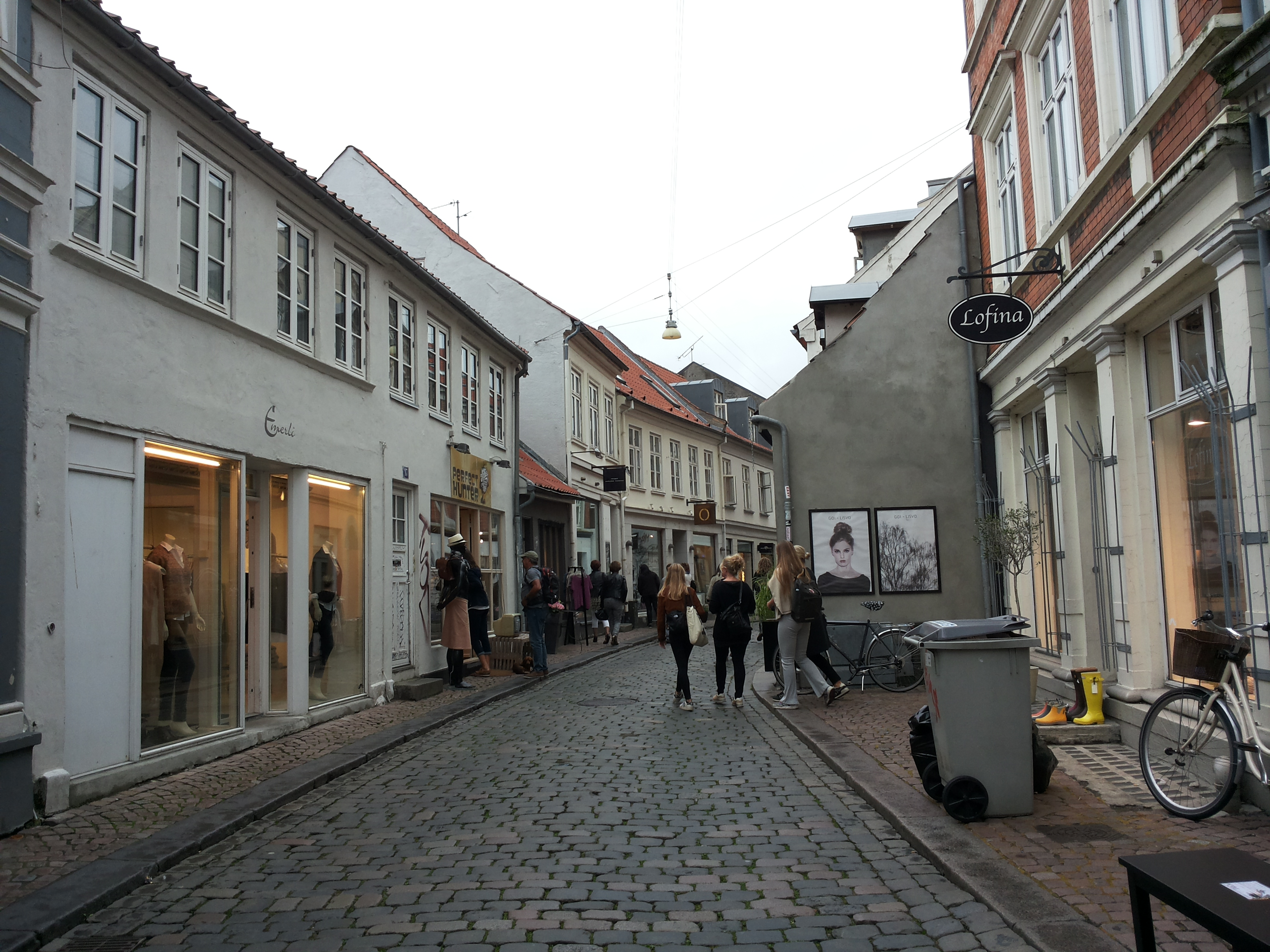

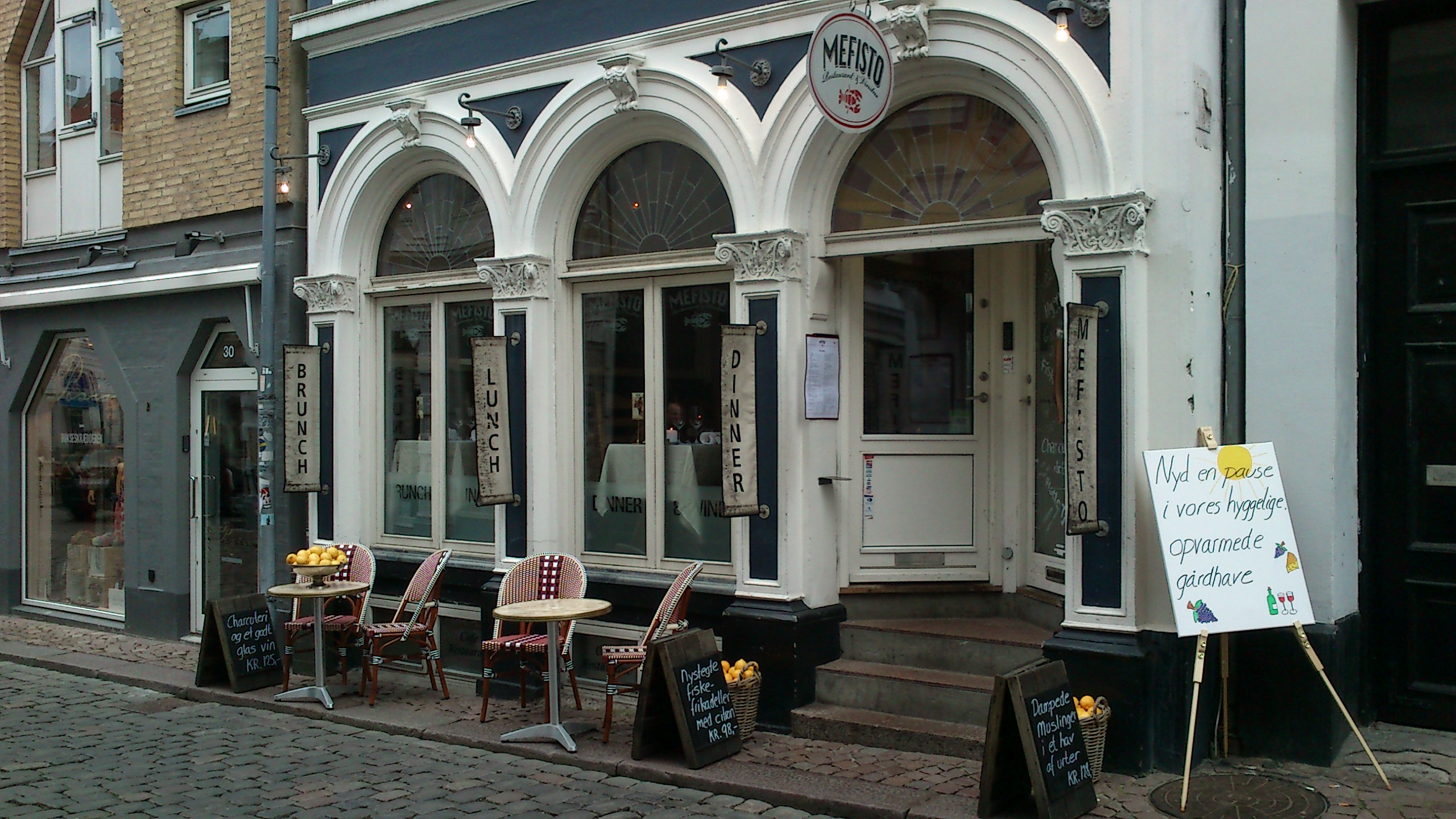

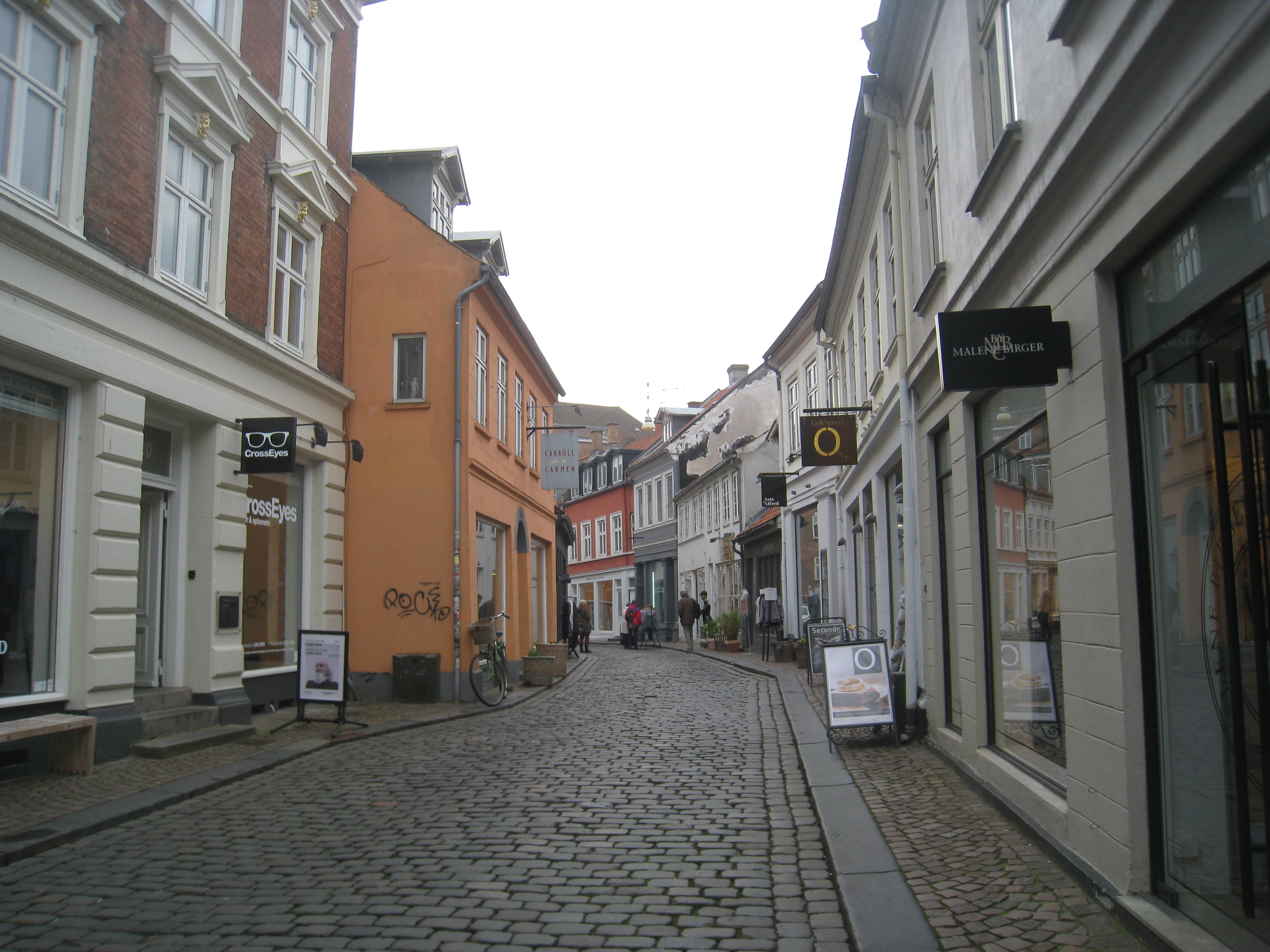

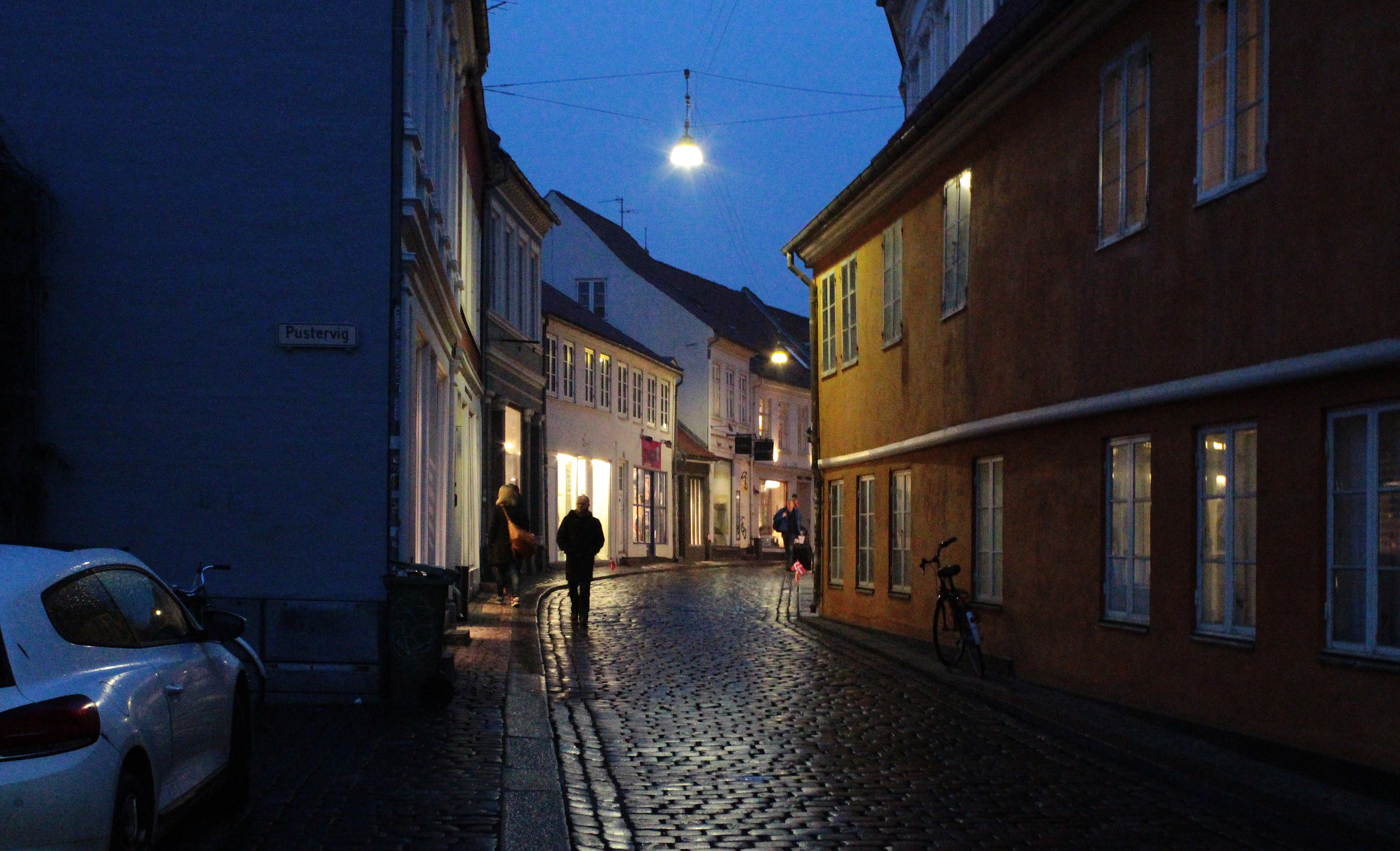
