= Magdolna Kovács =

Hungarian orienteering competitor

Medal record

Women's orienteering

Representing Hungary

World Championships
Bronze medal – third place	1976 Aviemore	Relay

Magdolna Kovács is a Hungarian orienteering competitor. At the 1976 World Orienteering Championships in Aviemore she received a bronze medal in the relay with the Hungarian team (with Irén Rostás and Sarolta Monspart). In 1979 she finished 14th in the individual event.
