= Frauke Sonderegger =

Swiss orienteering competitor

Medal record

Women's orienteering

Representing Switzerland

World Championships
| Bronze medal – third place | 1985 Bendigo | Relay |

Frauke Sonderegger is a Swiss orienteer. At the 1983 World Orienteering Championships in Zalaegerszeg she placed twelfth in the individual contest and fifth with the Swiss relay team. She won a relay bronze medal at the 1985 games in Bendigo.
