= Annariitta Kottonen =

Finnish orienteering competitor

Medal record

Women's orienteering

Representing Finland

World Championships
Bronze medal – third place	1983 Zalaegerszeg	Individual

Annariitta Kottonen (born 27 July 1958) is a Finnish orienteering competitor. She received a bronze medal in the individual event at the 1983 World Orienteering Championships in Zalaegerszeg, behind Annichen Kringstad and Marita Skogum. She finished 11th at the 1985 World championships.

== See also ==
- Finnish orienteers
- List of orienteers
- List of orienteering events
