= Brigitte Zürcher =

Swiss orienteering competitor

Medal record

Women's orienteering

Representing Switzerland

World Championships
Bronze medal – third place	1985 Bendigo	Relay

Brigitte Zürcher is a Swiss orienteering competitor at international level. At the World Orienteering Championships in Zalaegerszeg in 1983 she placed fifth with the Swiss relay team. She won a bronze medal in the relay at the World Orienteering Championships in Bendigo in 1985.
