= Mette Filskov =

Danish orienteering competitor

Medal record

Women's orienteering

Representing Denmark

World Championships
Bronze medal – third place	1983 Zalaegerszeg	Relay

Mette Filskov is a Danish orienteering competitor. She received a bronze medal in the relay event at the 1983 World Orienteering Championships in Zalaegerszeg, together with Hanne Birke, Karin Jexner and Dorthe Hansen.

== See also ==
- List of orienteers
- List of orienteering events
