= Hanne Birke =

Danish orienteering competitor

Medal record

Women's orienteering

Representing Denmark

World Championships
Bronze medal – third place	1983 Zalaegerszeg	Relay

Hanne Birke is a Danish orienteering competitor. She received a bronze medal in the relay event at the 1983 World Orienteering Championships in Zalaegerszeg, together with Mette Filskov, Karin Jexner and Dorthe Hansen, and placed fourth with the Danish team in 1985.

== See also ==
- List of orienteers
- List of orienteering events
