= Kjell Lauri =

Swedish orienteering competitor (1956–2023)

Medal record

Men's orienteering

Representing Sweden

World Championships
Gold medal – first place	1979 Tampere	Relay
Silver medal – second place	1978 Kongsberg	Relay
Silver medal – second place	1985 Bendigo	Relay
Bronze medal – third place	1983 Zalaegerszeg	Relay

Kjell Lauri (29 June 1956 – 11 August 2023) was a Swedish orienteering competitor. His achievements include winning a world championship gold medal in the relay with the Swedish team, and three more medals in the relay.

== Biography ==
Lauri was a Relay World Champion in 1979, as a member of the Swedish winning team, along with Rolf Pettersson, Lars Lönnkvist, and Björn Rosendahl. He also placed fourth in the individual contest. Lauri won the Jukola relay in 1981, 1984 and 1985.

Lauri won silver medals in the world championships relay in 1978 and 1985, and a bronze medal in 1983.

Kjell Lauri died from an accident on 11 August 2023, at the age of 67.
