= Anne Berit Eid =

Norwegian orienteer (born 1957)

Personal information
- Born: 13 June 1957 (age 69)

Sport
- Sport: Orienteering
- Club: Romerikslagets IL
Medal record
Women's orienteering
Representing Norway
World Championships
Gold medal – first place	1978 Kongsberg	Individual
Silver medal – second place	1979 Tampere	Relay

Anne Berit Eid (born 13 June 1957) is a Norwegian orienteering competitor. Her achievements include winning an individual world championship gold medal in 1978, and a silver medal in the relay in 1979.

== Biography ==
Born on 13 June 1957, Eid represented the Oslo club Romerikslagets IL.

She won the 1978 Individual World Orienteering Championships ahead of Liisa Veijalainen and Wenche Jacobsen. She also won a silver medal in the relay at the 1979 World Orienteering Championships.

She won four national titles in orienteering in 1979 and 1980.
