= Kari Sallinen =

Finnish orienteering competitor (born 1959)

Personal information
- Nationality: Finnish
- Born: 24 September 1959 (age 66)

Sport
- Sport: Orienteering
Medal record
Men's orienteering
Representing Finland
World Championships
Gold medal – first place	1985 Bendigo	Individual
Bronze medal – third place	1981 Thun	Relay

Kari Sallinen (born September 24, 1959) is a Finnish orienteering competitor. He was the first Finn who won the Individual World Orienteering Championships. The competition was held in the year 1985 in Bendigo, Australia. He was also part of the Finnish team that obtained bronze in the 1981 Relay World Championship in Thun, Switzerland. He won the Jukola relay in 1987.

His mother is Raili Sallinen.

== See also ==
- Finnish orienteers
- List of orienteers
- List of orienteering events
