= Risto Nuuros =

Finnish orienteer

Medal record

Men's orienteering

Representing Finland

World Championships
Silver medal – second place	1974 Silkeborg	Relay
Silver medal – second place	1978 Kongsberg	Individual
Silver medal – second place	1979 Tampere	Relay
Bronze medal – third place	1978 Kongsberg	Relay

Risto Nuuros (born 26 December 1950) is a Finnish orienteering competitor, individual silver medalist at the 1978 World Orienteering Championships in Kongsberg.

He received silver medals in the relay event in 1974 and 1979, and a bronze medal in 1978.

== See also ==
- Finnish orienteers
- List of orienteers
- List of orienteering events
