= Ruth Baumberger =

Swiss orienteering competitor

Medal record

Women's orienteering

Representing Switzerland

World Championships
Bronze medal – third place	1978 Kongsberg	Relay

Ruth Baumberger is a Swiss orienteering competitor. She competed at the 1974 World Orienteering Championships in Viborg, where she placed 11th in the individual contest, and fourth in the relay with the Swiss team. She participated on the Swiss team at the 1976 World Championships in Aviemore, where they placed sixth in the relay. At the World Championships in Kongsberg in 1978 she placed seventh in the individual course, and won a bronze medal in the relay, together with Ruth Humbel and Hanni Fries.
