= Hanni Fries =

Swiss orienteering competitor

Medal record

Women's orienteering

Representing Switzerland

World Championships
| Bronze medal – third place | 1978 Kongsberg | Relay |

Hanni Fries is a Swiss orienteering competitor who won a bronze medal in the relay at the World Orienteering Championships in Kongsberg in 1978, together with Ruth Baumberger and Ruth Humbel.
