= Eva Bártová =

Czech orienteer (born 1955)

Medal record

Women's orienteering

Representing Czechoslovakia

World Championships
Silver medal – second place	1983 Zalaegerszeg	Relay

Eva Bártová (born 1955) is a Czech orienteering competitor who competed for Czechoslovakia. She won a silver medal in the relay at the 1983 World Orienteering Championships in Zalaegerszeg, together with Iva Kalibanová, Jana Hlaváčová and Ada Kuchařová.
