= Emma Johansson (orienteer) =

Swedish orienteering competitor (born 1981)

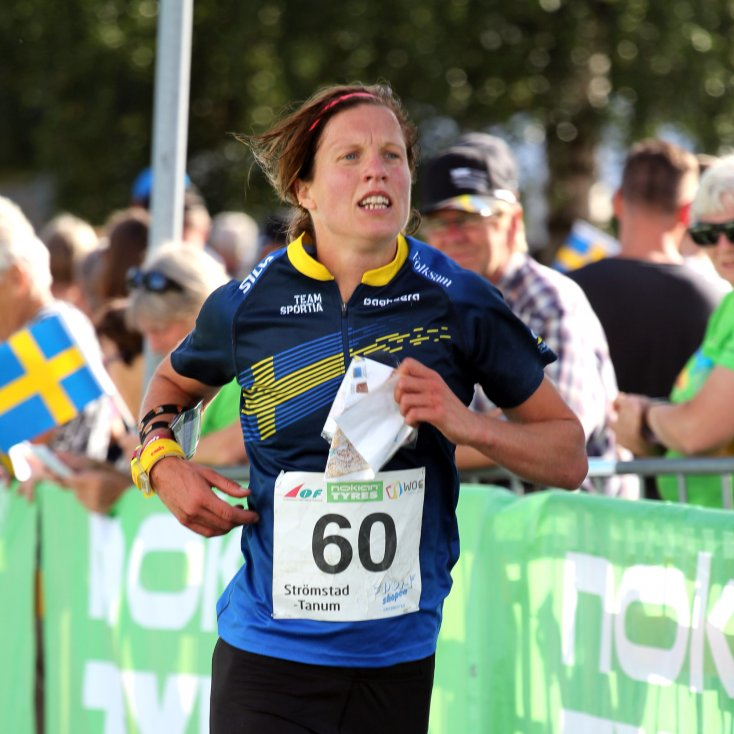
- Johansson in 2016

Personal information
- Nationality: Swedish
- Born: 7 October 1981 (age 44) Kristinehamn, Sweden

Sport
- Sport: Orienteering
- Club: Domnarvets GoIF
Medal record
Women's orienteering
Representing Sweden
World Championships
Gold medal – first place	2017 Tartu	Relay
Bronze medal – third place	2015 Inverness	Middle
Bronze medal – third place	2015 Inverness	Relay

Emma Johansson (born 7 October 1981) is a Swedish orienteering competitor.

She won a bronze medal in the middle distance at the 2015 World Orienteering Championships in Inverness.
