= Aigen im Ennstal =

- Municipality
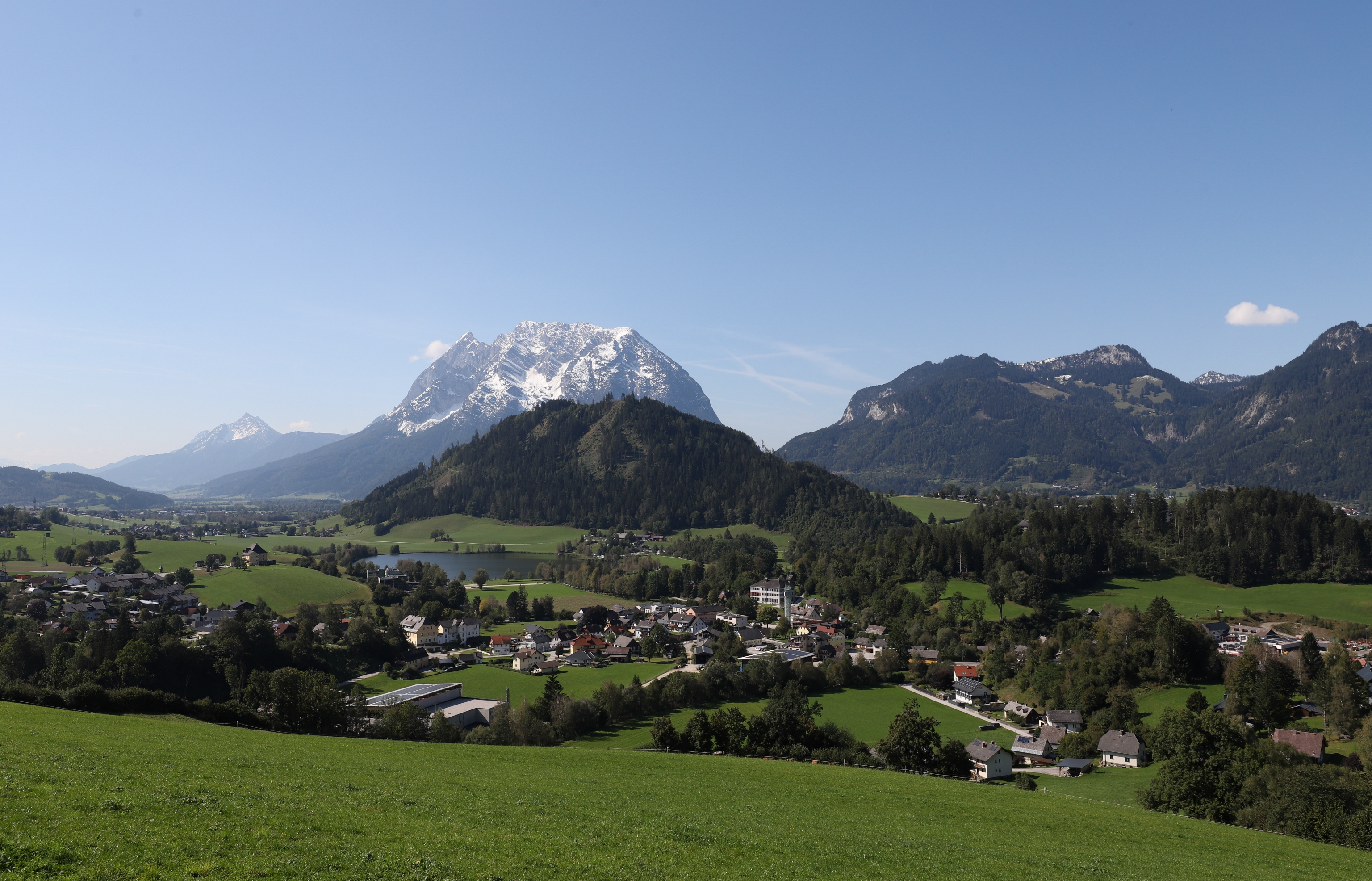

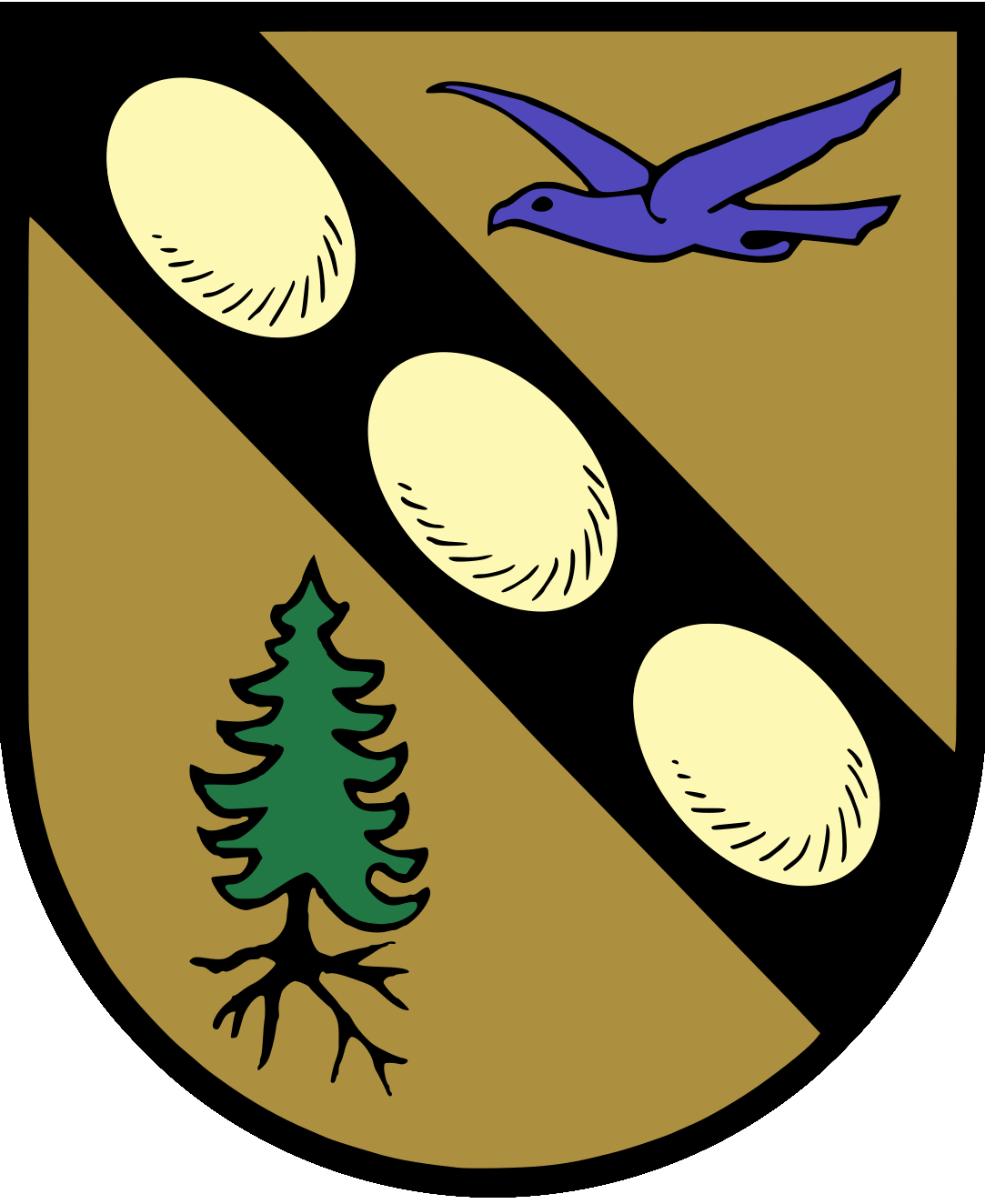
- Coat of arms

- Location within Austria
- Coordinates: 47°31′00″N 14°08′00″E
- Country: Austria
- State: Styria
- District: Liezen

Government
  - Mayor: Raimund Hager (ÖVP)

Area
  - Total: 86.42 km^{2} (33.37 sq mi)
- Elevation: 652 m (2,139 ft)

Population (2018-01-01)
  - Total: 2,722
  - Density: 31.50/km^{2} (81.58/sq mi)
- Time zone: UTC+1 (CET)
  - Summer (DST): UTC+2 (CEST)
- Postal code: 8943, 8940, 8952
- Area code: 03682
- Vehicle registration: LI
- Website: www.aigen.at

Aigen im Ennstal (German: [ˈaɪ̯gn̩ im ˈɛnsˌtaːl]) is a municipality in the district of Liezen in Styria, Austria. It was one of the locations used for filming "Where Eagles Dare".

== Geography ==
Aigen im Ennstal lies in the Styrian Enns valley south of the Enns about 10 km southwest of Liezen.

== Climate ==
Climate data for Aigen im Ennstal (1971–2000)
Month	Jan	Feb	Mar	Apr	May	Jun	Jul	Aug	Sep	Oct	Nov	Dec	Year
Record high °C (°F)	16.1 (61.0)	16.4 (61.5)	23.2 (73.8)	25.7 (78.3)	29.2 (84.6)	33.7 (92.7)	34.6 (94.3)	33.7 (92.7)	30.8 (87.4)	24.4 (75.9)	22.5 (72.5)	15.8 (60.4)	34.6 (94.3)
Mean daily maximum °C (°F)	0.7 (33.3)	3.6 (38.5)	8.7 (47.7)	13.2 (55.8)	18.6 (65.5)	21.2 (70.2)	23.2 (73.8)	23.0 (73.4)	19.2 (66.6)	13.8 (56.8)	6.1 (43.0)	1.2 (34.2)	12.7 (54.9)
Daily mean °C (°F)	−3.9 (25.0)	−1.6 (29.1)	2.6 (36.7)	6.5 (43.7)	11.6 (52.9)	14.7 (58.5)	16.5 (61.7)	16.0 (60.8)	12.1 (53.8)	7.0 (44.6)	1.2 (34.2)	−2.8 (27.0)	6.7 (44.1)
Mean daily minimum °C (°F)	−7.7 (18.1)	−5.8 (21.6)	−1.9 (28.6)	1.3 (34.3)	5.5 (41.9)	9.0 (48.2)	10.8 (51.4)	10.5 (50.9)	7.0 (44.6)	2.4 (36.3)	−2.2 (28.0)	−6.2 (20.8)	1.9 (35.4)
Record low °C (°F)	−27.7 (−17.9)	−26.8 (−16.2)	−19.8 (−3.6)	−7.3 (18.9)	−5.6 (21.9)	0.1 (32.2)	3.0 (37.4)	0.5 (32.9)	−5.2 (22.6)	−10.5 (13.1)	−22.8 (−9.0)	−29.8 (−21.6)	−29.8 (−21.6)
Average precipitation mm (inches)	67.6 (2.66)	47.5 (1.87)	70.3 (2.77)	57.6 (2.27)	78.3 (3.08)	117.0 (4.61)	135.0 (5.31)	110.1 (4.33)	81.7 (3.22)	61.8 (2.43)	66.3 (2.61)	76.0 (2.99)	969.2 (38.15)
Average snowfall cm (inches)	28.4 (11.2)	28.8 (11.3)	22.9 (9.0)	4.8 (1.9)	0.0 (0.0)	0.0 (0.0)	0.0 (0.0)	0.0 (0.0)	0.0 (0.0)	0.3 (0.1)	7.9 (3.1)	35.5 (14.0)	128.6 (50.6)
Average precipitation days (≥ 1.0 mm)	8.8	7.9	10.9	10.6	11.3	14.2	14.4	12.8	10.5	8.1	9.4	10.1	129
Average snowy days (≥ 1.0 cm)	23.2	20.9	10.8	2.0	0.0	0.0	0.0	0.0	0.0	0.3	6.2	18.8	82.2
Mean monthly sunshine hours	49.8	90.0	116.0	156.8	217.8	194.5	194.1	201.9	153.5	121.3	51.9	23.3	1,570.9
Source: Central Institute for Meteorology and Geodynamics
