= Liisa Veijalainen =

Finnish orienteer (born 1951)

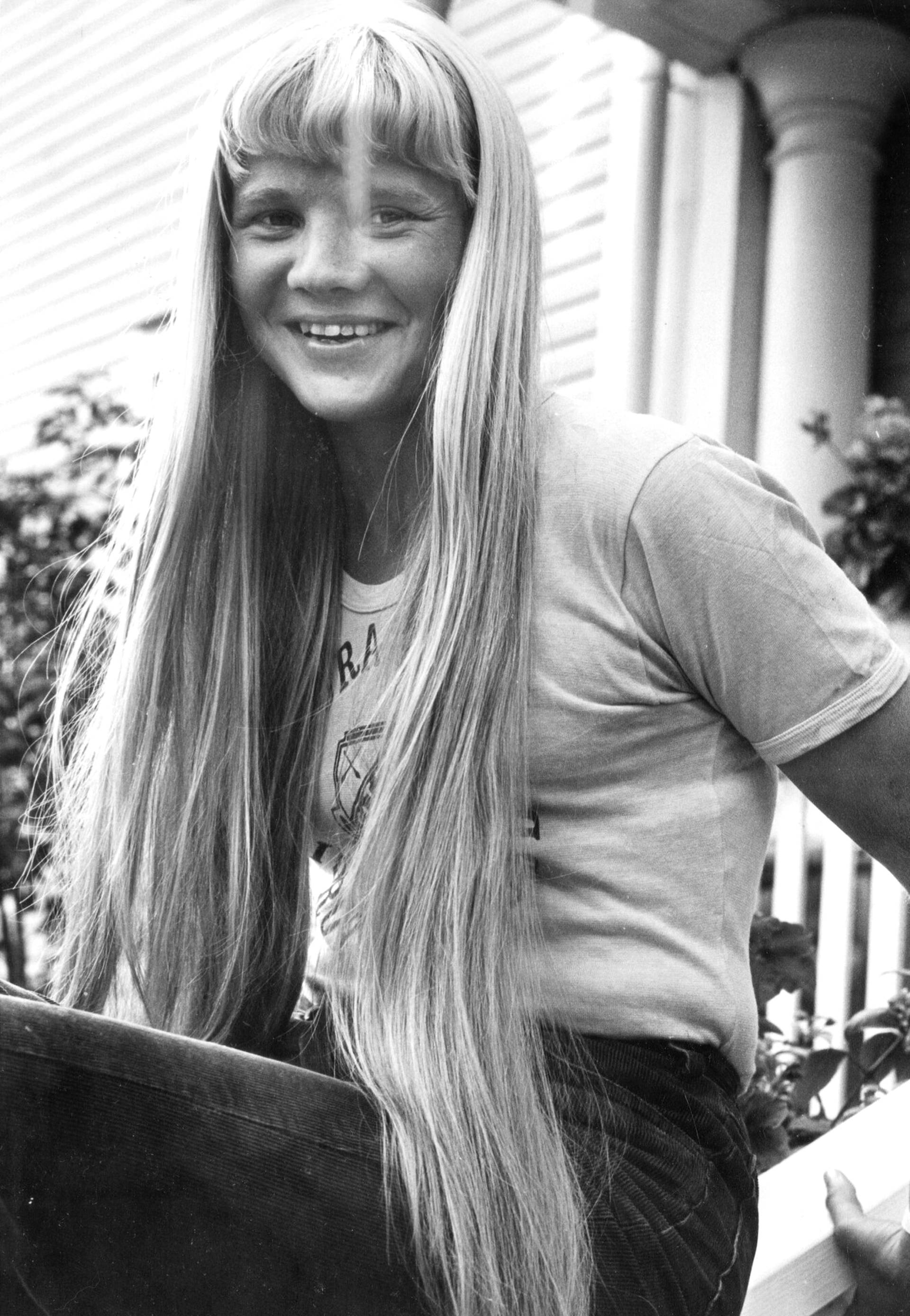
- Veijalainen in 1972

Medal record

Women's orienteering

Representing Finland

World Championships
Gold medal – first place	1972 Jicin	Relay
Gold medal – first place	1976 Aviemore	Individual distance
Gold medal – first place	1978 Kongsberg	Relay
Gold medal – first place	1979 Tampere	Relay
Silver medal – second place	1976 Aviemore	Relay
Silver medal – second place	1978 Kongsberg	Individual distance
Silver medal – second place	1979 Tampere	Individual distance
Silver medal – second place	1981 Thun	Relay

Liisa Kaarina Liljeström (née Liukkonen, formerly Veijalainen, formerly Peltola, born 4 April 1951) is a Finnish orienteering competitor. She won the 1976 Individual World Orienteering Championships, and took silver medal 1978 and 1979. She is also three times Relay World Champion, as a member of the Finnish winning team 1972, 1978 and 1979 (silver 1976 and 1981).

== Selected works ==
- Rastilta rastille. Espoo: Weilin+Göös. 1980. ISBN 951-35-2245-8. OCLC 17027183. (Autobiography in Finnish.)
- Från skärm till skärm. Afterword by Seppo Veijalainen: Med tränarens ögon (pp. 93–122). Kaarina: Juoksija. 1981. ISBN 951-99340-7-3. OCLC 57873495. (Autobiography in Swedish.)

== See also ==
- List of orienteers
- List of orienteering events
