= Ellen Sofie Olsvik =

Norwegian orienteer (born 1962)

Personal information
- Born: 7 July 1962 (age 63)

Sport
- Sport: Orienteering; Ski orienteering
Medal record
Representing Norway
Women's orienteering
World Championships
Gold medal – first place	1987 Gérardmer	Relay
Silver medal – second place	1985 Bendigo	Relay
World Cup
Gold medal – first place	1986	WC Overall
Women's ski-orienteering
World Championships
Gold medal – first place	1986 Batak, Bulgaria	Relay

Ellen Sofie Olsvik (born 7 July 1962) is a Norwegian orienteering competitor, world champion in the relay event, and winner of the first overall Orienteering World Cup. She is also world champion in ski-orienteering.

== Career ==
Olsvik won a gold medal in the relay event at the 1987 World Orienteering Championships, together with Ragnhild Bratberg, Ragnhild Bente Andersen and Brit Volden. She received a silver medal in 1985.

Olsvik won the first overall Orienteering World Cup in 1986, with a total score of 112 points, before Jorunn Teigen (108 points) and Karin Rabe (101 points).

She received a gold medal in relay at the 1986 World Ski Orienteering Championships in Batak, Bulgaria, together with Toril Hallan and Ragnhild Bratberg. She also competed in cross-country skiing, with a silver medal in the 20 km race at the national championships.

She represented the clubs Nydalens SK, Bækkelagets SK, NTHI, Orkanger IF and Byåsen IL.
