= Brit Volden =

Norwegian orienteer (born 1960)

Personal information
- Born: 4 April 1960 (age 66)
- Spouse: Øyvin Thon
- Relatives: Harald Thon (brother-in-law)

Sport
- Sport: Orienteering
- Club: Bækkelagets SK; Kongsberg IF
Medal record
Women's orienteering
Representing Norway
World Championships
Gold medal – first place	1987 Gérardmer	Relay
Silver medal – second place	1979 Tampere	Relay
Silver medal – second place	1981 Thun	Individual
Silver medal – second place	1985 Bendigo	Individual

Brit Volden (born 4 April 1960) is a Norwegian orienteering competitor. Her achievements include two individual silver medals, and one gold and one silver medal in the relay at the World Orienteering Championships. She also won the unofficial World Cup in 1983 and placed second overall in 1984 and 1988.

Winning two Nordic titles and five individual national titles, she was awarded the King's Cup trophy two times.

== Orienteering career ==
Volden won a gold medal in the relay at the 1987 World Orienteering Championships, along with Ragnhild Bratberg, Ragnhild Bente Andersen and Ellen Sofie Olsvik. She also won a silver medal for Norway in the relay in 1979, behind the Finnish relay team. She won individual silver medals at the 1981 World Orienteering Championships, behind Annichen Kringstad, and in 1985.

She won the overall World Cup in 1983 (unofficial cup), and finished second in 1984 and 1988.

She won five individual national titles and four national relay titles, and became Nordic champion in 1984 and 1986. She was awarded the Kongepokal (King's Cup) trophy at the national championships twice, in 1983 and 1985. The King's Cup is awarded to the one female and one male athlete who obtains the assumed best result (among the various disciplines) during a senior national championship.

She represented the sports clubs Bækkelagets SK and Kongsberg IF.

== Personal life ==
Born on 4 April 1960, Volden is married to orienteer Øyvin Thon. In 2005 they both climbed Cho Oyu (8201 meters). In 2011 she climbed Dhaulagiri (8,167 m), along with her husband Øyvin and Stian Voldmo, and these were the first three Norwegians to climb this mountain.

After her sports career, Volden has worked as a pharmacist in Kongsberg. She has three children with her husband Øyvind Thon.
