= Annichen Kringstad =

Swedish orienteering competitor

Medal record

Women's orienteering

Representing Sweden

World Championships
Gold medal – first place	1981 Thun	Individual
Gold medal – first place	1981 Thun	Relay
Gold medal – first place	1983 Zalaegerszeg	Individual
Gold medal – first place	1983 Zalaegerszeg	Relay
Gold medal – first place	1985 Bendigo	Individual
Gold medal – first place	1985 Bendigo	Relay

Annichen Kringstad (born 15 July 1960 in Oslo, Norway) is a Swedish orienteer. Kringstad was the first household name orienteer in Sweden, and she was a major reason for the popularisation of the sport. Kringstad won the world championships individually as well as in the relay format in 1981, 1983 and 1985, before retiring at the age of 25. She represented Säffle OK, OK Ravinen and Stora Tuna IK orienteering clubs.

She won the Svenska Dagbladet Gold Medal and Jerring Award in 1981.

Preceded by Thomas Wassberg	Svenska Dagbladet Gold Medal; 1981	Succeeded by Mats Wilander
