= Karin Rabe =

Swedish orienteering competitor

Medal record

Women's orienteering

Representing Sweden

World Championships
| Gold medal – first place | 1981 Thun | Relay |
| Gold medal – first place | 1983 Zalaegerszeg | Relay |
| Gold medal – first place | 1985 Bendigo | Relay |
| Gold medal – first place | 1989 Skövde | Relay |
| Silver medal – second place | 1978 Kongsberg | Relay |
| Silver medal – second place | 1987 Gérardmer | Individual |
| Silver medal – second place | 1987 Gérardmer | Relay |
| Bronze medal – third place | 1979 Tampere | Relay |
| Bronze medal – third place | 1981 Thun | Individual |

Karin Rabe (born 17 February 1954) is a Swedish orienteering competitor. She is four times Relay World Champion as a member of the Swedish winning team in 1981, 1983, 1985 and 1989, as well as having silver medals from 1978 and 1987, and a bronze medal from 1979. She obtained silver in the Individual World Championship in 1987, and bronze in 1981.
