= Ragnhild Bratberg =

Norwegian orienteer (born 1961)

Personal information
- Born: 9 June 1961 (age 65) Ringsaker Municipality, Norway

Sport
- Sport: Orienteering; Ski orienteering; Cross-country skiing
- Club: Ringsaker O-lag; Ringsaker IF
Medal record
Representing Norway
Women's orienteering
World Championships
Gold medal – first place	1987 Gérardmer	Relay
Silver medal – second place	1985 Bendigo	Relay
Silver medal – second place	1991 Marianske Lazne	Relay
World Cup
Gold medal – first place	1988	WC Overall
Silver medal – second place	1990	WC Overall
Women's ski orienteering
World Championships
Gold medal – first place	1986 Batak	Classic
Gold medal – first place	1986 Batak	Relay
Gold medal – first place	1988 Kuopio	Short
Gold medal – first place	1990 Skelleftå	Classic
Gold medal – first place	1990 Skelleftå	Short
Silver medal – second place	1988 Kuopio	Classic
World Cup
Silver medal – second place	1989	WC Overall

Ragnhild Bratberg (born 9 June 1961) is a Norwegian orienteering competitor and a cross-country skier. In orienteering, she won the overall Orienteering World Cup in 1988, and represented Norway several times in the World Orienteering Championships relays, winning medals in 1985, 1987 and 1991. In ski orienteering she won four individual gold medals at the World Ski Orienteering Championships, and once in the relay. She was awarded Egebergs Ærespris in 1988.

== Personal life ==
Bratberg was born in Ringsaker Municipality on 9 June 1961.

== Orienteering career ==
Bratberg is Relay World Champion in Orienteering from 1987 as a member of the Norwegian winning team, together with Ragnhild Bente Andersen, Ellen Sofie Olsvik and Brit Volden. She won silver medals in the relay in the 1985 and 1991 World Orienteering Championships. At the 1981 World Orienteering Championships she was part of the Norwegian team that placed fourth, and placed 10th in the individual contest.

She won the Overall Orienteering World Cup in 1984 (unofficial cup) and in 1988, and finished second in 1990.

She won a total of 14 individual national titles in orienteering, and became Nordic champion in 1988.

== Ski orienteering career ==
Bratberg has won four individual World Championships in Ski Orienteering. She won gold medal in the individual competition in 1986. In 1988 she placed first in the short course and second in the long course. In 1990 she won both the long and short courses.

She became Relay World Champion in 1986, along with Toril Hallan and Ellen Sofie Olsvik. In 1988 the Norwegian team won silver medals, and in 1990 her team won bronze medals. She finished second in the World Cup 1989.

== Cross country skiing ==
Starting her sports career with cross country skiing, Bratberg’s achievements include winning a gold medal in the relay, and a silver medal in 5 km at the 1980 FIS Nordic Junior World Ski Championships. She won the women’s class in Birkebeinerrennet in 1991.

== Awards ==
Bratberg was awarded Egebergs Ærespris in 1988, for her accomplishments in orienteering and skiing.

Preceded by Oddvar Brå	Egebergs Ærespris; 1988	Succeeded by Grete Ingeborg Nykkelmo
