= Weltzien =

Weltzien is a surname. Notable people with the surname include:

- Audun Weltzien (born 1983), Norwegian orienteering competitor
- Eystein Weltzien (born 1949), Norwegian orienteering competitor
- Ingunn Hultgreen Weltzien (born 1986), Norwegian orienteering competitor and cross-country skier
- Karl Weltzien (1813–1870), German scientist
- Ludwig von Weltzien (1815–1870), Prussian lieutenant general
