= Øystein Halvorsen =

Norwegian orienteer

Medal record

Men's orienteering

Representing Norway

World Championships
Silver medal – second place	1976 Aviemore	Relay

Øystein Halvorsen is a Norwegian orienteering competitor who competed in the 1970s.

== Biography ==
Halvorsen won bronze medals at the Norwegian Championships in orienteering in 1973 and in 1976, and a silver medal in 1977.

He won a silver medal in the relay event at the 1976 World Orienteering Championships in Aviemore together with Jan Fjærestad, Svein Jacobsen and Egil Johansen, and placed tenth in the individual course.
