= Jan Fjærestad =

Norwegian orienteer (born 1954)

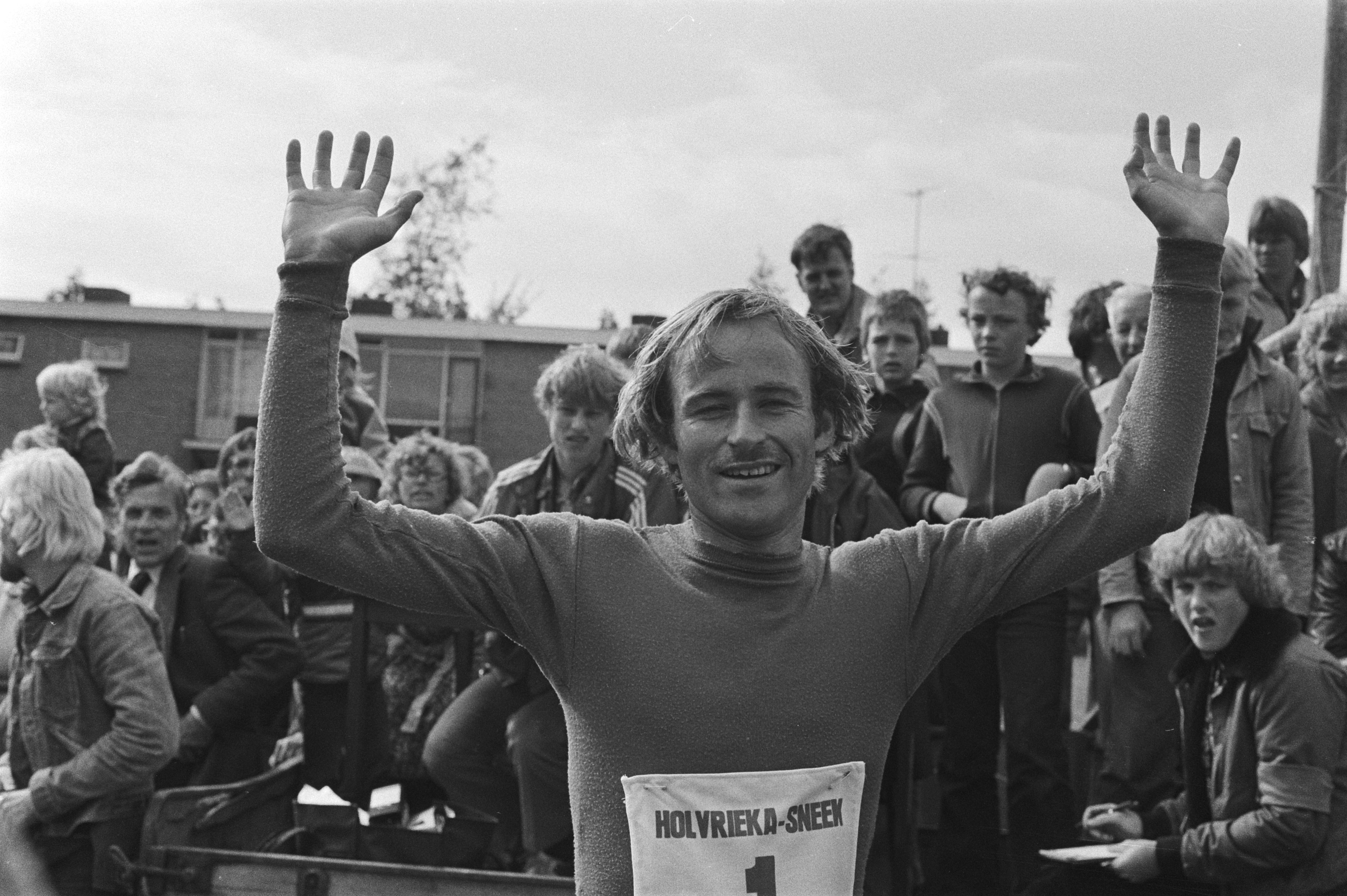
- Fjærestad in 1978

Personal information
- Born: 28 February 1954 (age 72)

Sport
- Sport: Orienteering; Athletics
- Club: Fana IL
Medal record
Men's orienteering
Representing Norway
World Championships
Gold medal – first place	1978 Kongsberg	Relay
Silver medal – second place	1974 Silkeborg	Individual
Silver medal – second place	1976 Aviemore	Relay
Bronze medal – third place	1974 Silkeborg	Relay

Jan Fjærestad (born 28 February 1954) is a retired Norwegian orienteering competitor and athlete. His achievements in orienteering include an individual silver medal at the 1974 World Orienteering Championships and a world championship title in the relay in 1978. He won three national titles in marathon.

== Personal life ==
Born on 28 February 1954, Fjærestad represented the Bergen club Fana IL.

== Sports career ==
=== Orienteering ===
Fjærestad is Relay World Champion from 1978 as a member of the Norwegian winning team, along with Svein Jacobsen, Egil Johansen, and Eystein Weltzien. He won a silver medal in the relay in 1976, and a bronze medal in 1974.

He won an individual silver medal in the 1974 World Orienteering Championships in Denmark, behind winner Bernt Frilén.

=== Athletics ===
He is also a marathon runner, winner of the Nordic Championship in 1977, and three times national marathon champion. He also has medals at the Norwegian championships in 5000 metres, 10,000 metres and half marathon. He represented the club Fana IL. Internationally he competed at the 1978 European Championships, the 1983 World Cross Country Championships and the 1983 World Championships, but without any success.

His personal best times were:

- 3000 metres - 7:57.06 min (1982).
- 5000 metres - 13:37.2 min (1978).
- 10,000 metres - 28:25.52 min (1981) - ninth among Norwegian 10,000 m runners.
- Half marathon - 1:03:43 hrs (1980).
- Marathon - 2:13:31 hrs (1983) - tenth among Norwegian marathon runners.

== Achievements ==
- All results regarding marathon, unless stated otherwise

Year	Competition	Venue	Position	Notes
Representing Norway
1983	World Championships	Helsinki, Finland	55th	2:30:58
