= Ludwig Dietrich Eugen von Gayl =

Lieutenant-General Ludwig Diedrich Eugen Freiherr von Gayl
- Born: 4 October 1785; Stendal
- Died: 9 September 1853 (aged 67); Oldenburg
- Military career
- Allegiance: Prussia; Kingdom of Westphalia; Grand Duchy of Oldenburg
- Branch: Prussian Army; Westphalian Army (Grand Duchy of Oldenburg) Oldenburg Army
- Service years: 1798–1848
- Rank: Lieutenant-General
- Commands: Oldenburg Regiment; Oldenburg-Hanseatic Brigade; X Corps (German Confederation)
- Awards: House and Merit Order of Peter Frederick Louis; Order of the Zähringer Lion; Royal Guelphic Order; Order of the Dannebrog

Ludwig Diedrich Eugen Freiherr von Gayl (4 October 1785 - 9 September 1853) was a lieutenant general from Oldenburg.

== Life ==
Ludwig von Gayl came from the East Prussian noble family von Gayl. He was the son of the landowner Kasimir Wilhelm von Gayl (1746–1821) and his wife Sophie Anna Charlotte, née von Jagow of the House of Pöllnitz (1757–1813).

As the younger son destined for an officer's career, he joined the Prussian Army as a cadet in 1798 and received his commission as a second lieutenant in the Foot Guards Regiment in 1807. Because his father's estate was located in the newly created Kingdom of Westphalia, Gayl was forced to leave the Prussian Army in 1810. He became a captain in the Westphalian Grenadier Guard Battalion. With this battalion, he participated in Napoleon's campaign against Russia in 1812 and was taken prisoner, severely wounded.

After the dissolution of the Kingdom of Westphalia, he entered military service in the Grand Duchy of Oldenburg as a captain in April 1814. In 1815, he participated in the campaign against France with the Oldenburg Regiment. Appointed chamberlain in 1817, from 1819 he served as governor (male governess) and traveling companion to the Oldenburg princes Peter (1812–1881) and Alexander (1810–1829), the sons of George of Oldenburg (1784–1812) and Grand Duchess Catherine Pavlovna (1788–1819), Queen of Württemberg by her second marriage. He was promoted to major in 1818 and to lieutenant colonel in 1830.

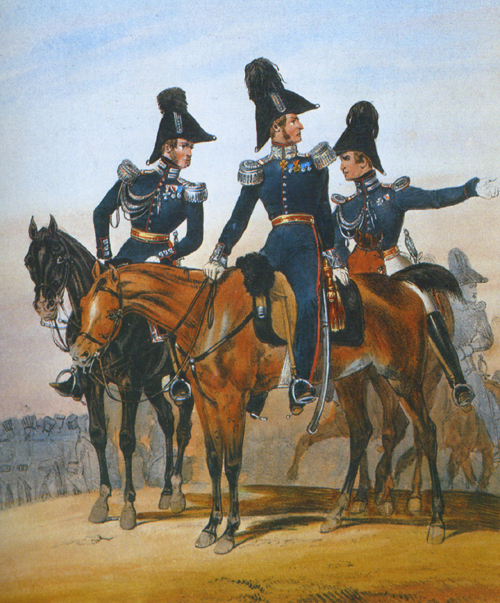
Oldenburg staff officers around 1830

In 1833, he was given command of the 2nd Oldenburg Infantry Regiment and simultaneously promoted to colonel. After Wilhelm Gustav Friedrich Wardenburg's death in 1838, Gayl rose to his position and was appointed major general and commander of the Oldenburg contingent on May 1, 1839. This position also included command of the Oldenburg-Hanseatic Brigade. After the outbreak of the German revolutions of 1848–1849 and the beginning of the Schleswig-Holstein uprising in 1848, Gayl assumed command of the troops deployed to the duchies against Denmark on behalf of the German Confederation. However, he proved himself unequal to this task and was dismissed with the rank of lieutenant general on July 13, 1848. Wilhelm von Ranzow became his successor. On September 1, 1848, Gayl was briefly assigned command of the non-mobile troop corps (X. Federal Corps). He was awarded the Order of the Red Eagle, First Class, and after his final retirement, became a Chamberlain of Oldenburg.

== Family ==
Gayl was initially married to Elisabeth, née von Levetzow, in 1811. After her early death in 1813, he married Anna Marie Hollmann (1796–1857), daughter of the Oldenburg General Superintendent Anton Georg Hollmann (1756–1831), on October 5, 1819, in Oldenburg. This second marriage produced the later General Peter von Gayl and District Administrator Ernst von Gayl. The daughter Marie Friederike Alexandrine (1827–1908) married the Oldenburg Lord Chamberlain Friedrich Kurd von Alten (1822–1894), Eugenie (b. 14 May 1825) married the Lord House Marshal Goswin von Grün (1815–1896), and the youngest Elisabeth (b. 24 April 1835) married the Chamberlain Baron Ludwig von Lützow, called von Dorgelo (1824–1899).

== Awards ==
- Oldenburg House and Merit Order of Peter Frederick Louis:

- Capitulary Small Cross, January 17, 1840
- Capitulary Commander, February 10, 1852

- Cross for 25 Years of Military Service in Gold
- Commander, First Class, of the Order of the Zähringer Lion
- Commander, First Class, of the Royal Guelphic Order
- Commander of the Order of the Dannebrog

== Bibliography ==
- Ernst Wilhelm Theodor Zedelius, Personal-Chronik der oldenburgischen Officiere und Mailitairbeamten von 1775 bis 1867. Oldenburg 1876, p. 20..
- Almanach de Gotha 1879, Twenty-Ninth Year (Justus Perthes, Gotha 1878), p. 228..
- Kurt von Priesdorff: Soldatisches Führertum. Volume 10, Hanseatic Publishing House Hamburg, n.p. [Hamburg], n.d. [1942], pp. 502–503, No. 3355. DNB-IDN 986919810
- Gayl, Ludwig Diedrich Eugen Freiherr von. in: Hans Friedl et al. (eds.): Biographisches Handbuch zur Geschichte des Landes Oldenburg. Published on behalf of the Oldenburgische Landschaft. Isensee, Oldenburg 1992, p. 225. ISBN 3-89442-135-5.
