= Gert Pettersson =

Swedish orienteering competitor

Medal record

Men's orienteering

Representing Sweden

World Championships
Gold medal – first place	1976 Aviemore	Relay

Gert Pettersson (born 16 January 1953) is a Swedish orienteering competitor. He is Relay World Champion from 1976, as a member of the Swedish winning team, along with Erik Johansson, Arne Johansson and Rolf Pettersson.
