= Erik Johansson (orienteer) =

Swedish orienteering competitor (born 1947)

Medal record

Men's orienteering

Representing Sweden

World Championships
Gold medal – first place	1976 Aviemore	Relay

Erik Johansson (born 18 May 1947) is a Swedish orienteering competitor. He won a gold medal in the relay at the 1976 World Orienteering Championships in Aviemore, with the Swedish relay team, together with Gert Pettersson, Arne Johansson and Rolf Pettersson.
