= Ingrid Ohlsson =

Swedish orienteering competitor

Medal record

Women's orienteering

Representing Sweden

World Championships
Gold medal – first place	1976 Aviemore	Relay

Ingrid Linnea Ohlsson (born 31 May 1950) is a Swedish orienteering competitor. She is Relay World Champion from 1976, as a member of the Swedish winning team, along with Kristin Cullman and Anne Lundmark.
