= 1972 World Orienteering Championships =

1972 edition of the World Orienteering Championships

- Host city: Staré Splavy
- Country: Czechoslovakia
- Events: 4

The 4th World Orienteering Championships were held in Staré Splavy, Czechoslovakia, 14–16 September 1972.

The championships had four events; individual contests for men and women, and relays for men and women.

== Medalists ==
Event	Gold		Silver		Bronze	
Men's individual	Åge Hadler (NOR)	1.35.57	Stig Berge (NOR)	1.40.52	Bernt Frilén (SWE)	1.43.55
Women's individual	Sarolta Monspart (HUN)	1.17.01	Pirjo Seppä (FIN)	1.18.35	Birgitta Larsson (SWE)	1.18.53
Men's relay	Sweden (SWE): Lennart Carlström; Rolf Pettersson; Arne Johansson; Bernt Frilén	4.41.37	Switzerland (SUI): Dieter Hulliger; Dieter Wolf; Bernard Marti; Karl John	4.47.23	Hungary (HUN): Zoltán Boros; János Sotér; Géza Vajda; András Hegedűs	5.09.29
Women's relay	Finland (FIN): Sinikka Kukkonen; Pirjo Seppä; Liisa Veijalainen	2.33.42	Sweden (SWE): Birgitta Johansson; Ulla Lindkvist; Birgitta Larsson	2.45.00	Czechoslovakia (TCH): Naďa Mertová; Renata Vlachová; Anna Hanzlová	2.38.59

== Results ==
=== Women's individual ===
WOC 1972 – Individual – Women (7.1 km)
Rank	Competitor	Nation	Time
1	Sarolta Monspart	Hungary	1:17:01
2	Pirjo Seppä	Finland	
3	Birgitta Larsson	Sweden	
4	Ulla Lindkvist	Sweden	
5	Ingrid Hadler	Norway	
6	Liisa Veijalainen	Finland	
7	Kristin Danielsen	Norway	
8	Birgitta Johansson	Sweden	
9	Magda Horváth	Hungary	
10	Naďa Mertová	Czechoslovakia	
11	Renata Vlachová	Czechoslovakia	
12	Linda Verde	Norway	
13	Mona Hebo	Denmark	
14	Anna Handzlová	Czechoslovakia	
15	Elsa Arnesson	Sweden	

=== Men's individual ===
WOC 1972 – Individual – Men (13.5 km)
Rank	Competitor	Nation	Time
1	Åge Hadler	Norway	1:35:57
2	Stig Berge	Norway	
3	Bernt Frilén	Sweden	
4	Dieter Hulliger	Switzerland	
5	Petr Uher	Czechoslovakia	
6	Dieter Wolf	Switzerland	
7	Risto Nuuros	Finland	
8	Zdeněk Lenhart	Czechoslovakia	
9	Veijo Tahvanainen	Finland	
10	Lennart Carlström	Sweden	
11	Geoffrey Peck	Great Britain	
12	Rolf Pettersson	Sweden	
