= Mona Nørgaard =

Danish orienteering competitor

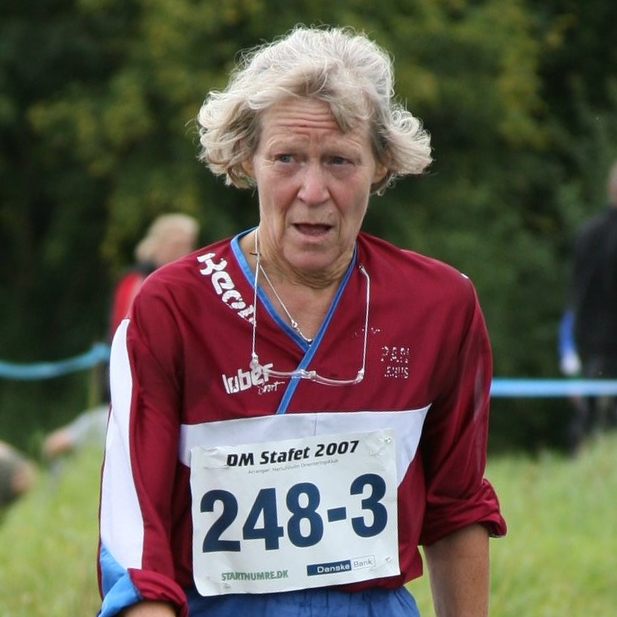
- Nørgaard in 2007

Medal record

Women's orienteering

Representing Denmark

World Championships
Gold medal – first place	1974 Silkeborg	Individual

Mona Nørgaard (born 23 February 1948) is a Danish orienteering competitor. She won gold medal in the individual contest at the 1974 World Orienteering Championships, ahead of Kristin Cullman.

== See also ==
- Danish orienteers
- List of orienteers
- List of orienteering events
