= Battle of Werbach =

- Part of Austro-Prussian War
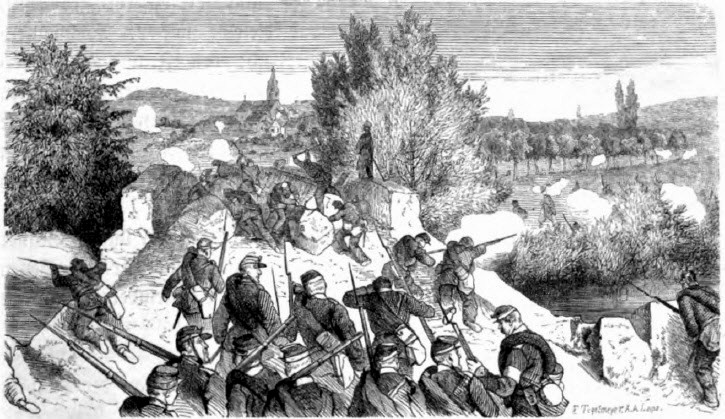
- Fight at the bridge over the Tauber. Woodcut by Ludwig Burger, 1871.
Date	24 July 1866
Location	Werbach, Baden 49.67181°N 9.64394°E
Result	Prussian Alliance Victory

Belligerents
Prussia; Oldenburg; Bremen	Baden; Württemberg

Commanders and leaders
August von Goeben; Ludwig von Weltzien	Prince Wilhelm of Baden; Oskar von Hardegg

Units involved
13th Division	VIII Army Corps

Strength
5,000 soldiers	5,000 soldiers

Casualties and losses
12 dead; 59 wounded	7 dead; 60 wounded, 16 missing

The Battle of Werbach took place during the Austro-Prussian War as part of the Campaign of the Main on 24 July 1866 between the Prussian Alliance and the German Federal Army.

== History ==
After his march into Frankfurt (16 July), the commander of the Prussian Army on the Main, Eduard Vogel von Falckenstein, was recalled and replaced by Edwin von Manteuffel. The Prussian army was also increased to 60,000 men. From 21 July the Prussians marched from Frankfurt towards Würzburg to prevent the unification of the Federal Army. After crossing the Odenwald, there were a series of battles with Baden, Hessian and Württemberg units of the VIII Corps of the Federal Army on the Tauber until 24 July.

The VII Army Corps of the Federal Army was formed by the Bavarian Army. This corps under Prince Karl of Bavaria was in the Würzburg area. Karl of Bavaria was also the commander-in-chief of the federal troops in southern Germany and the aim was to lead the two federal corps into battle against the Prussian Main Army.

== Participating organizations ==
In the Werbach area met on 24 July 1866 (three weeks after the decisive battle of Königgrätz) the 13th Prussian division with the Oldenburg-Hanseatic Brigade under the command of Major General Ludwig von Weltzien, as well as the Baden division under the command of Prince Wilhelm of Baden.

The 8th Federal Corps, consisting of four divisions under the command of Alexander von Hessen-Darmstadt, was divided into the following places on 24 July:

- The (Württemberg) division near Tauberbischofsheim under Lieutenant General Oskar von Hardegg
- The ( Baden ) Division near Werbach under Lieutenant General Prince Wilhelm of Baden
- The (Hesse-Darmstadt) Division near Großrinderfeld under Lieutenant General von Perglas
- The (Austrian - Nassau ) division near Grünsfeld - Paimar under Field Marshal Lieutenant Erwin von Neipperg

The Prussian Main Army consisted of three divisions under Edwin von Manteuffel

- 13th Infantry Division under Lieutenant General August Karl von Goeben who would advance on Tauberbischofsheim and Werbach
- The combined division under Major General Gustav Friedrich von Beyer who would advance on Werbach
- The combined division under Major General Eduard Moritz von Flies who would advance on Wertheim

The Order of Battle of the participating associations in a contemporary representation:

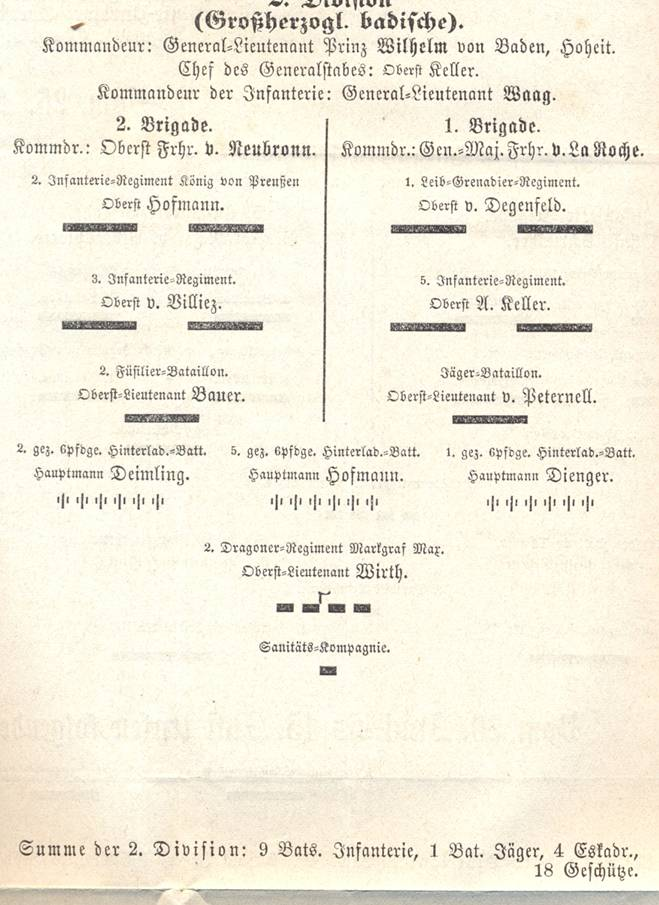
2nd Division in the VIII Federal Army Corps, 1866

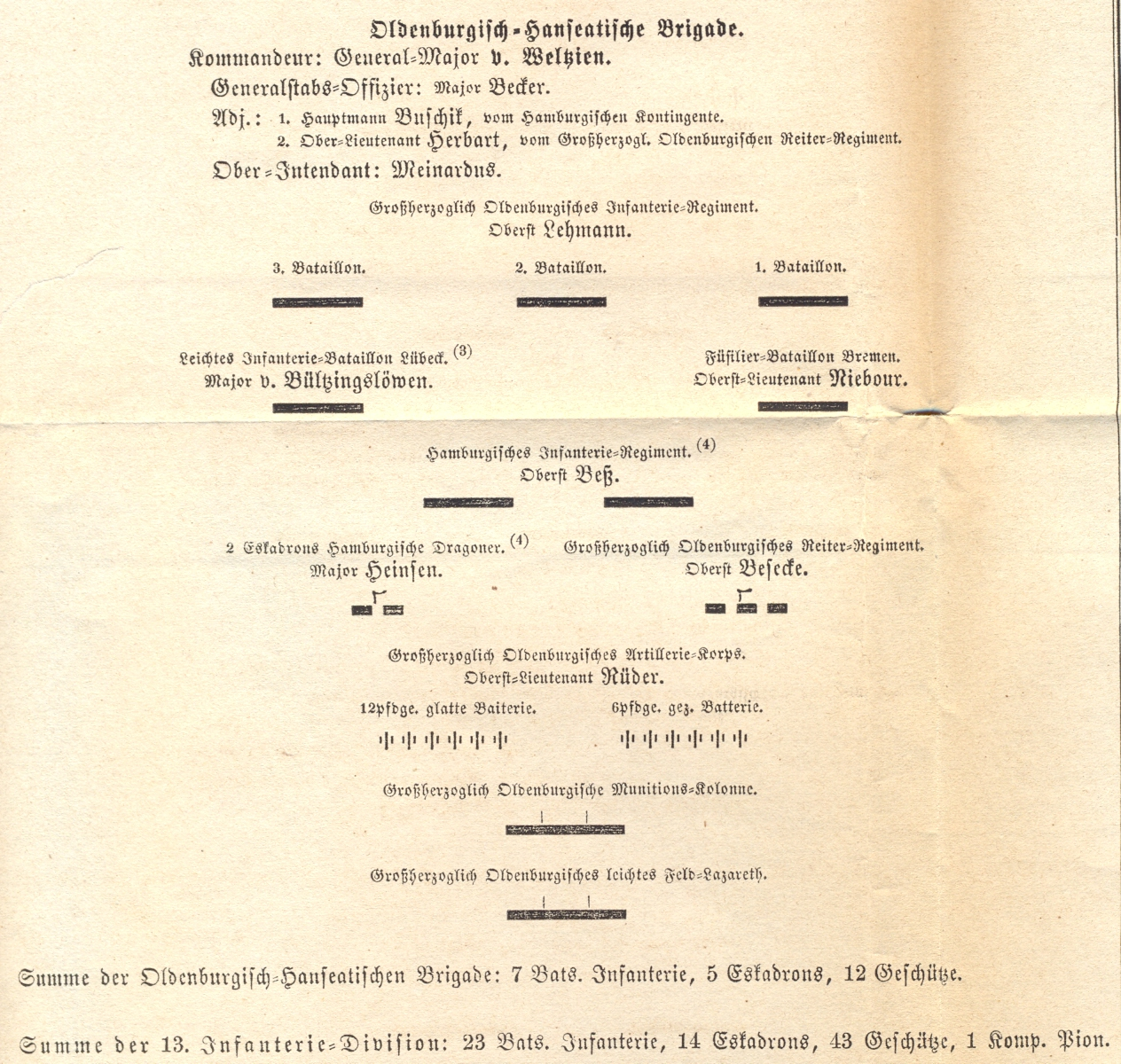
Oldenburg-Hanseatic Brigade in the 13th Inf. Div. of the Prussian Main Army 1866

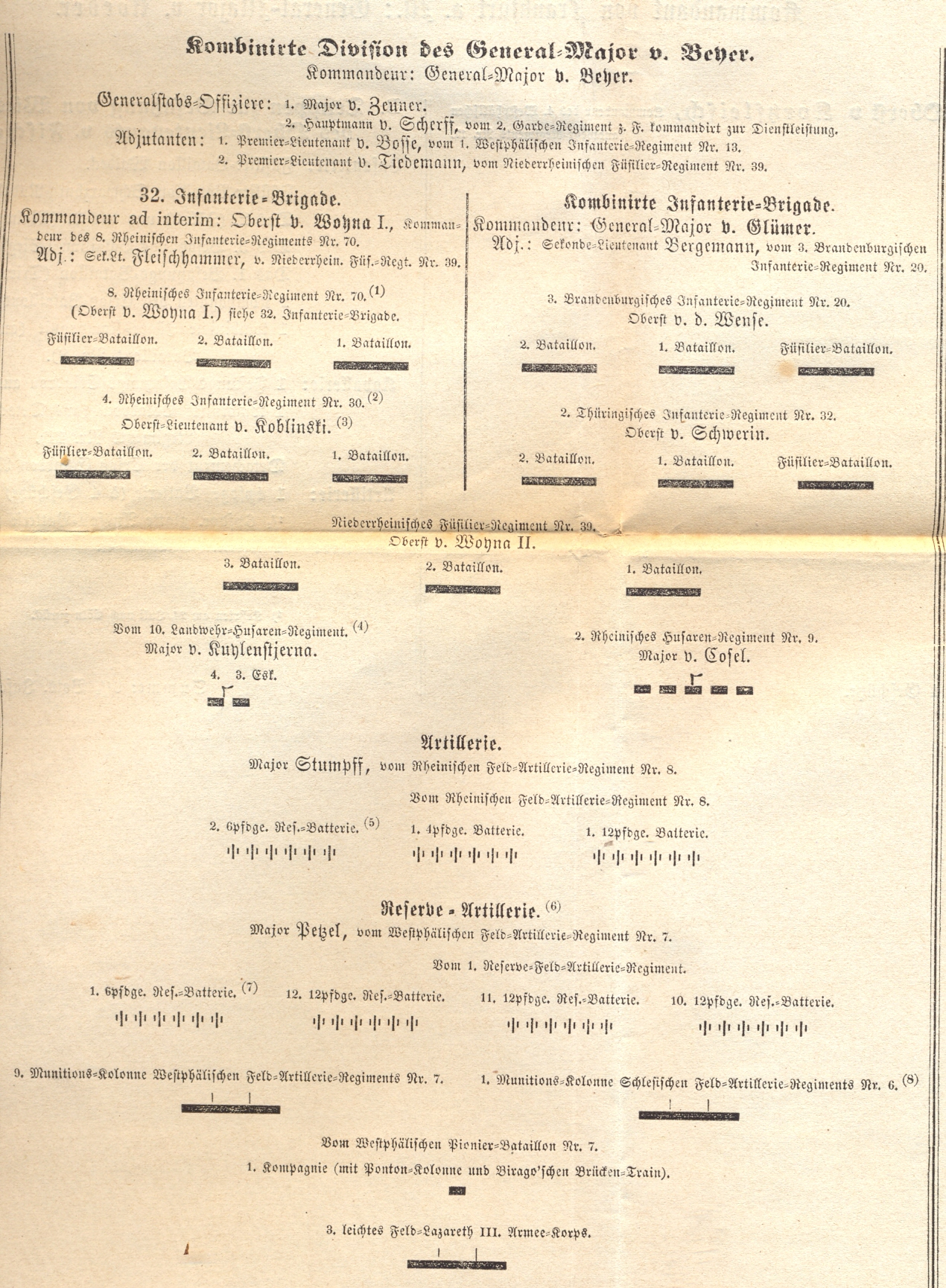
Combined Div. Beyer in the Prussian Main Army in 1866

== Events at the Tauber ==
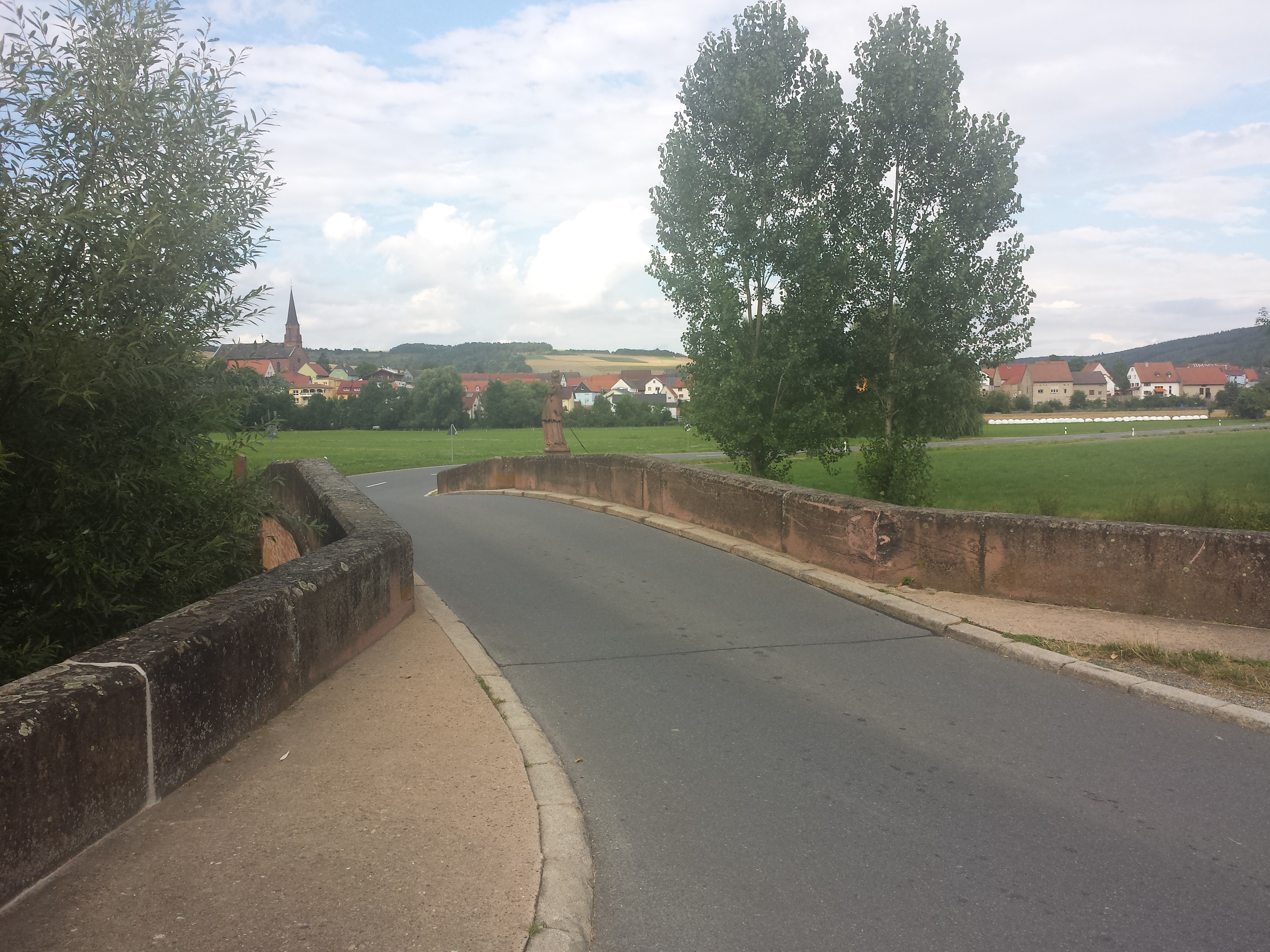
Tauber Bridge, where the fighting took place in 1866.

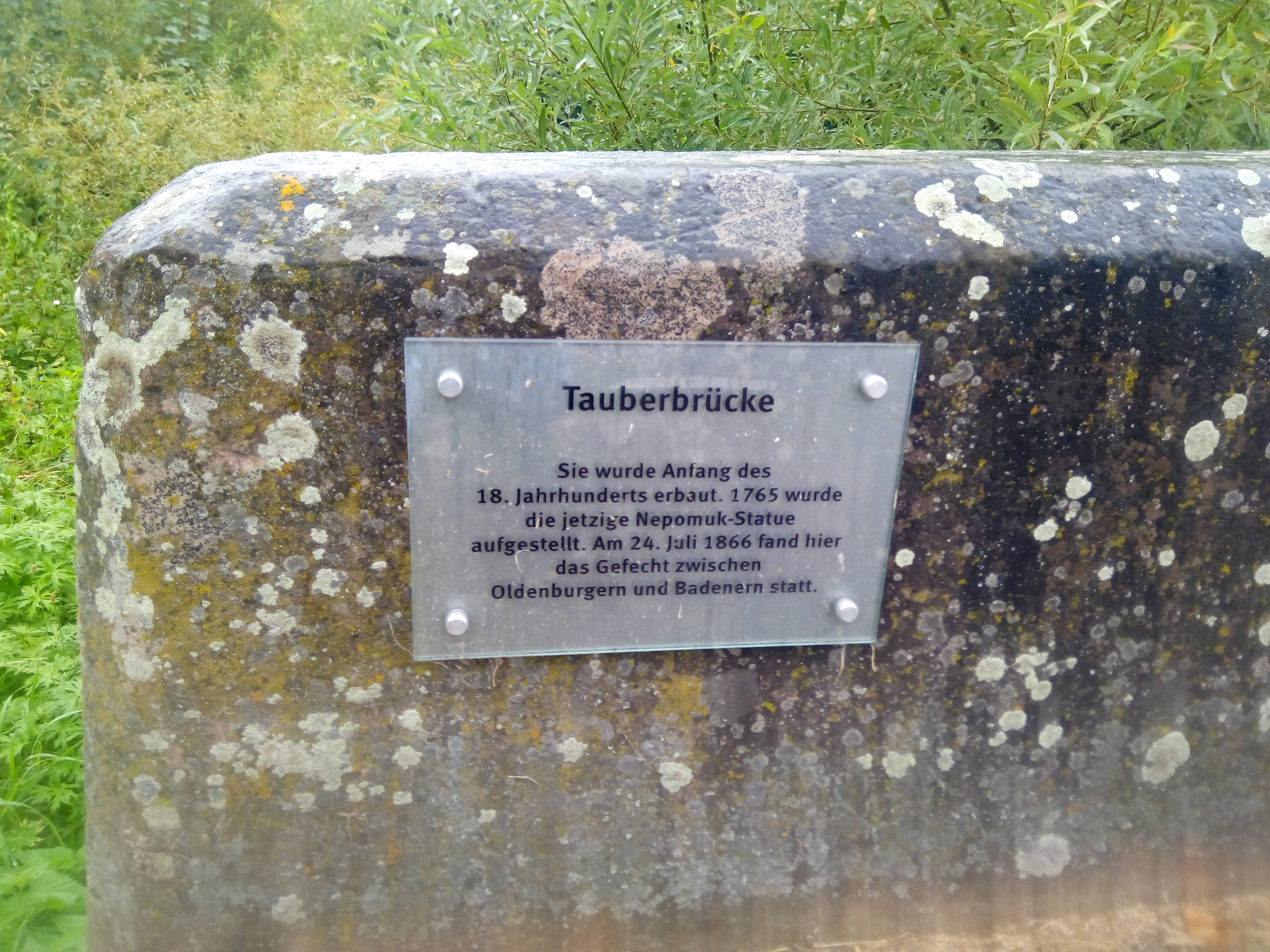
The historic Tauber Bridge in 2016 Sign for the battle near Werbach on the Tauber Bridge

On the advance the Prussians advanced to three places on the Tauber: the Goeben division on the right wing to Tauberbischofsheim, the Beyer division in the center to Werbach and the Flies division on the left wing to Wertheim. On the Tauber, the Prussians first met the VIII. Corps, which was already planning to march towards Aschaffenburg . On 23 July, there was a first battle near Hundheim, but the commander of the VIII Corps, Prince Alexander of Hesse, realized too late that he was facing the entire Army of the Main. Shortly after the Oldenburg Brigade arrived in front of Hochhausen, the Avantgarde of the 13th Prussian Infantry Division under August Karl von Goeben reached the Wrangel Brigade near Bischofsheim and began on 24 July the battle near Tauberbischofsheim with the Württemberg division of the VIII Army Corps under Lieutenant General Oskar von Hardegg.

The combined Prussian division Flies crossed the Tauber near Wertheim without encountering any resistance . Prince Alexander assumed that this transition would be covered by the Bavarian army corps.

== The Battle ==
The Baden division stood on 24 July at 12 noon between Werbach and Werbachhausen on the right bank of the Tauber and also controlled the Tauber crossing at Hochhausen, where 2 companies of the 2nd regiment were located. The 3rd regiment was in Werbach itself. The 2nd Infantry Brigade of the Baden Division was deployed with five battalions and two artillery detachments - a total of around 5,000 men.

At 12.30 p.m. the Oldenburg- Hanseatic Brigade under Major General Ludwig von Weltzien reached the heights southwest of Hochhausen. After artillery battles near Hochhausen and Werbach, the infantry attack by 3 battalions of the Oldenburg-Hanseatic Brigade on Hochhausen began at 3 p.m. The Oldenburg Brigade had three Oldenburg and one Bremen infantry battalions, as well as two artillery divisions. The brigade received support from the fusilier battalion of the 8th Rhenish Infantry Regiment No. 70 and two other artillery divisions of the combined Beyer division, so that around 5,000 men were deployed.

The avant-garde of the Beyer division also intervened in the battle with the fusilier battalion of the 8th Rhenish Infantry Regiment No. 70 and an artillery division. The Baden troops evacuated Hochhausen without any resistance worth mentioning. At 4 p.m. the infantry attack on Werbach began, where the Baden troops offered heavy resistance, but ultimately had to retreat in the Welzbach valley. A battery in Württemberg near Impfingen set fire to Hochhausen, but was soon driven from its position. The Baden division withdrew to the Bavarian Unteraltertheim, with the rearguard remaining with Steinbach with the Baden army was thus pushed out of the Grand Duchy of Baden.

== Aftermath ==
Prince Alexander, the commander in chief of the VIII Army Corps, saw his right flank threatened by the withdrawal of the Baden division and sent the Hessian division from Großrinderfeld to Wenkheim on 24 July.

The VIII Federal Corps united with the VII Army Corps advancing from Würzburg with the Bavarian troops. On 3 August 1866 an armistice was agreed between Baden and Prussia in Würzburg. Bavaria had already agreed an armistice on 28 July, Württemberg and Hesse on 1 August.

== Monuments ==
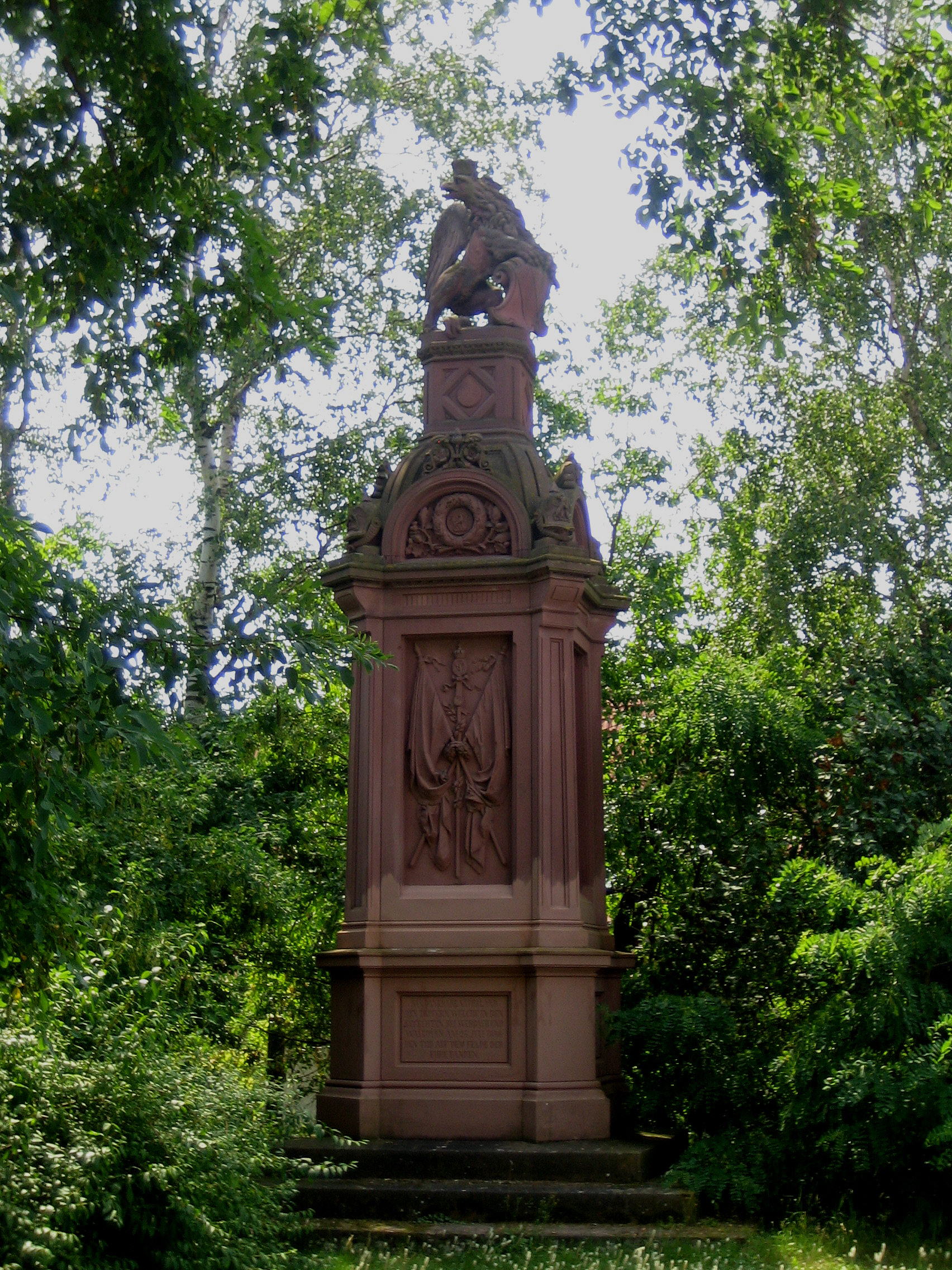
Memorial to the Baden soldiers who fell in 1866 in Werbach

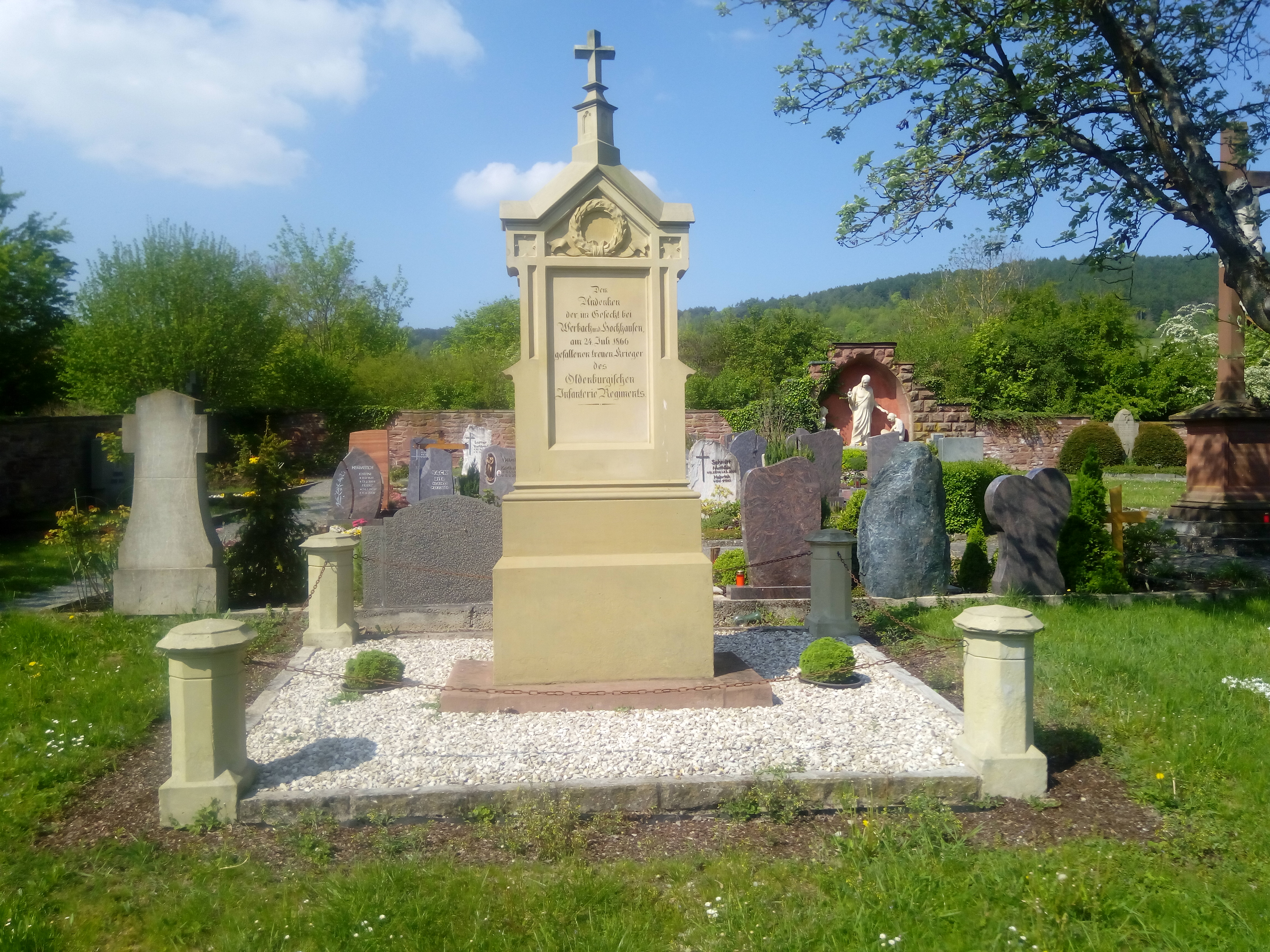
Memorial for the fallen soldiers of the Oldenburg regiment in the Hochhausen cemetery

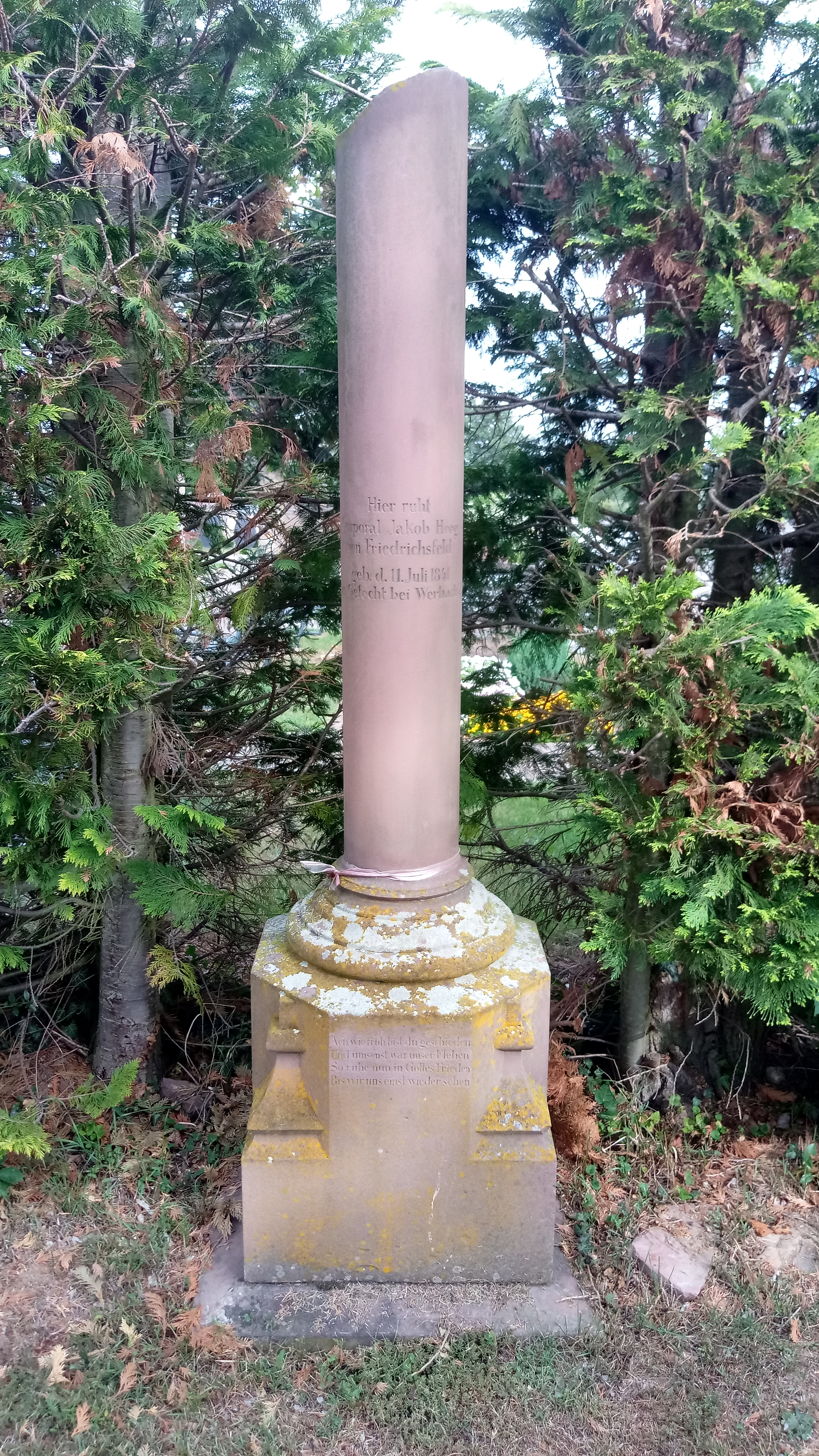
Grave of the Baden corporal Jakob Heeg in the cemetery in Werbach

== Literature ==
- Kriegsgeschichtliche Abteilung des Großen Generalstabs Hrsg.: Der Feldzug von 1866 in Deutschland, Ernst Siegfried Mittler und Sohn, Berlin 1867, S. 653–657 in der Google-Buchsuche
- Wilhelm von Baden: Zur Beurtheilung des Verhaltens der badischen Felddivision im Feldzuge des Jahres 1866: nach authentischen Quellen, Darmstadt und Leipzig 1866, S. 27–35 online in der Google-Buchsuche
- H.v.B.: Der deutsche Krieg im Jahre 1866: Nach den bis jetzt vorhandenen Quellen von H. v. B. Mit 6 Portraits, 2 Karten, 3 Beilagen und der vollständigen Ordre de bataille der preußischen, österreichischen, sächsischen, hannoverschen und westdeutschen Armee, Verlag von Neumann-Hartmann, Elbing 1867, S. 344–347 online in der Google-Buchsuche
- Alexander von Hessen-Darmstadt: Feldzugs-Journal des Oberbefehlshabers des 8ten deutschen Bundes-Armee-Corps im Feldzuge des Jahres 1866 in Westdeutschland, Eduard Zernin, Darmstadt & Leipzig 1867 online in der Google-Buchsuche
- Theodor Fontane: Der deutsche Krieg von 1866. 2. Band: Der Feldzug in West- und Mitteldeutschland. Berlin 1871, S. 210–213 online in der Google-Buchsuche
- Ernst Becker: Geschichte des 2. Badischen Grenadier-Regiments Kaiser Wilhelm Nr. 110. Berlin 1877, S. 112–119 und Verlustliste auf S. 170 Digitalisat im Internet Archive
- Adolf Legde: Geschichte des 2. Badischen Dragoner-Regiments Nr. 21, Berlin 1893, S. 38–40 Digitalisat im Internet Archive
