= Birgitta Johansson =

Swedish orienteering competitor (born 1943)

Medal record

Women's orienteering

Representing Sweden

World Championships
Silver medal – second place	1972 Jičín	Relay

Birgitta Johansson (born 4 July 1943) is a Swedish orienteering competitor. She won a silver medal in the relay event at the 1972 World Orienteering Championships in Jičín, together with Ulla Lindkvist and Birgitta Larsson, and finished eighth in the individual event.
