= János Sőtér =

Hungarian orienteering competitor

Medal record

Men's orienteering

Representing Hungary

World Championships
Bronze medal – third place	1972 Jičín	Relay

János Sőtér is a Hungarian orienteering competitor. He received a bronze medal in the relay event at the 1972 World Orienteering Championships in Jičín, together with Zoltán Boros, Géza Vajda and András Hegedűs.
