= Dana Procházková =

Medal record

Women's orienteering

Representing Czechoslovakia

World Championships
Bronze medal – third place	1974 Viborg	Relay

Dana Procházková (born 1951) is an orienteering competitor who competed for Czechoslovakia. At the 1974 World Orienteering Championships in Viborg she won a bronze medal in the relay, together with Anna Handzlová and Renata Vlachová.
