= Wilhelm Gustav Friedrich Wardenburg =

Major-General Wilhelm Gustav Friedrich Wardenburg
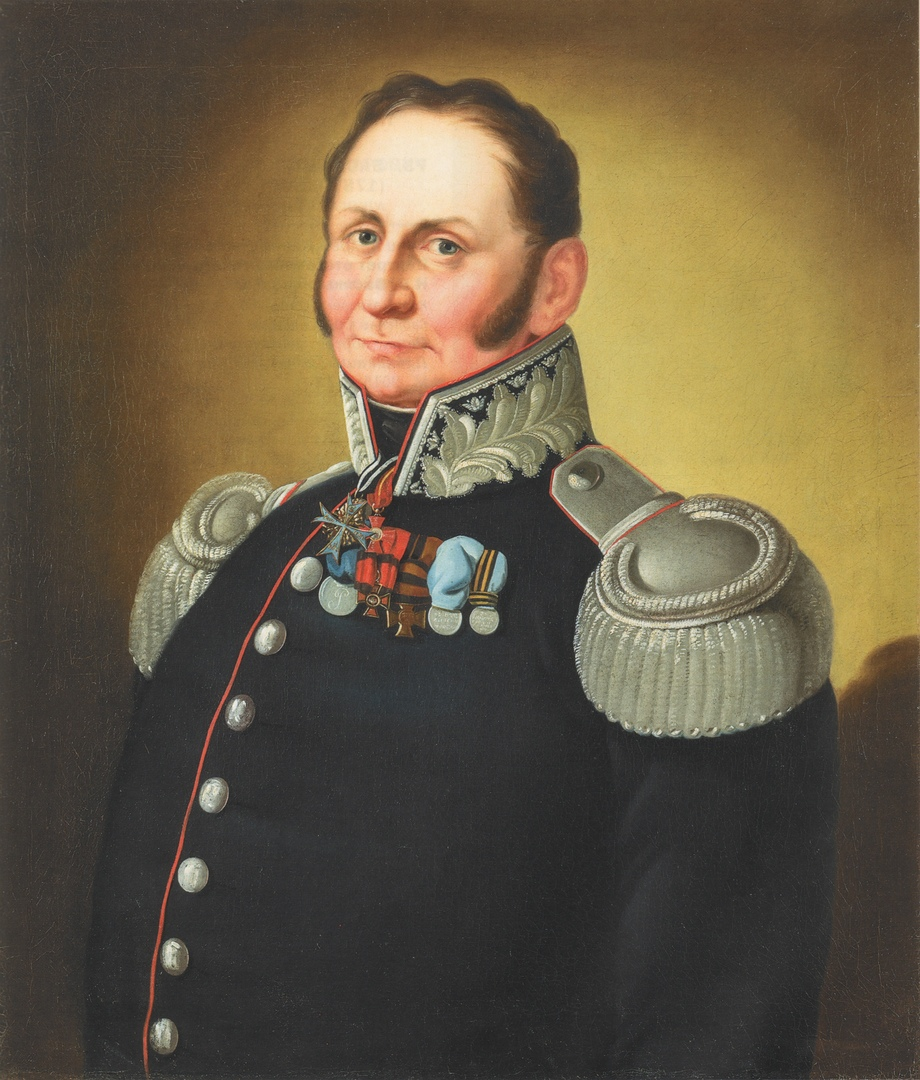
- Portrait of Wardenburg by unknown artist
- Born: 15th May 1781
- Died: 29 May 1838 (aged 57); Oldenburg
- Burial place: Churchyard of St. Gertrude in Oldenburg
- Military career
- Allegiance: Holy Roman Empire; Russian Empire; Grand Duchy of Oldenburg
- Branch: Imperial Austrian Army; Imperial Russian Army (Grand Duchy of Oldenburg) Oldenburg Army
- Service years: 1799–1838
- Rank: Major-General
- Commands: Oldenburg Regiment; Oldenburg-Hanseatic Brigade
- Awards: Pour le Mérite

Wilhelm Gustav Friedrich Wardenburg (15 May 1781 - 29 May 1838) was a career officer from Oldenburg. He was instrumental in building up the Oldenburg military during the Wars of Liberation, and the Oldenburg contingent in the German Federal Army during the time of the German Confederation. Wardenburg also worked as a collector, researcher, and military historian.

== Birth, education, and service abroad ==
He was the son of Pastor Adam Levin Wardenburg and his second wife, Gesche Magdalene, née Ohmstede. After receiving private tuition, Wardenburg attended the Oldenburg Gymnasium from 1795. However, he left school after just two years to pursue a career as officer in the small Oldenburg Guard Company. In 1799, he left the company as an Ensign and attempted to join the army of the Russian general Alexander Suvorov in Northern Italy, but failed. He then joined the Austrian army, was wounded during the campaign in Northern Italy, and promoted to Lieutenant in 1800. After the Peace of Lunéville, he came to Bohemia with his regiment and remained in the garrison there until 1805. Through the mediation of Duke Peter Friedrich Ludwig, he managed to transfer to the Russian army and joined the "Azov" Regiment again as a lieutenant. He participated in the campaigns in Austria 1805, East Prussia 1807, and Finland 1808 and was wounded several times. In 1810, he became adjutant to Prince Peter Friedrich George of Oldenburg, who was serving as governor in Russian service. He was then promoted to First Lieutenant and, after the invasion of Russia by Napoleon I, was transferred to the staff of the Russian commander-in-chief. He again distinguished himself through bravery in several battles and was promoted to Staff Captain.

In 1813, he joined the Russian-German Legion organized by Peter Friedrich Ludwig and was promoted to Lieutenant Colonel in May and to Colonel in January 1814.

== Activity in the Oldenburg Military ==
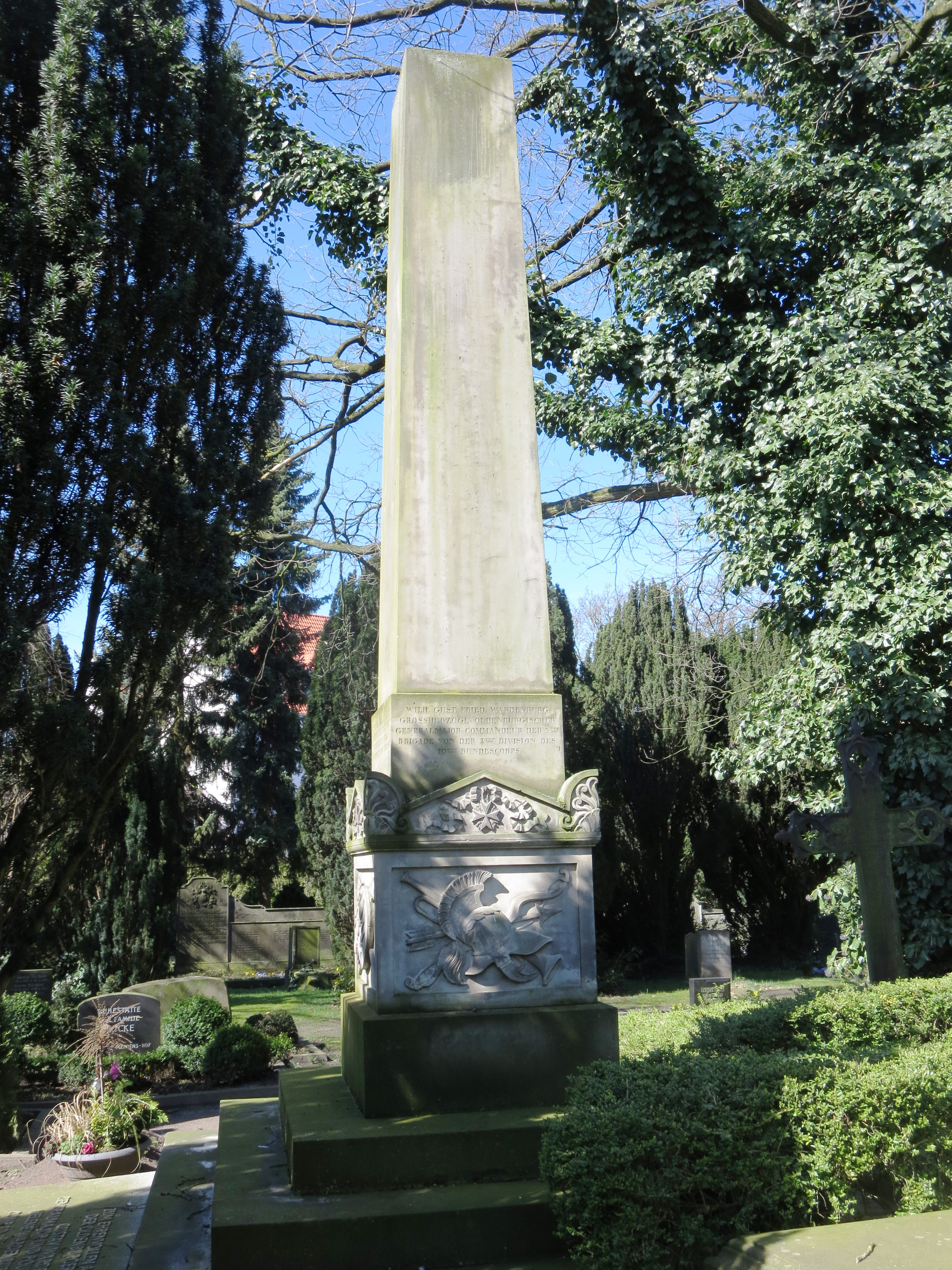
Memorial stone in the Churchyard of St. Gertrude in Oldenburg

In August 1814, Wardenburg entered the Oldenburg military service as a colonel and established the Oldenburg Regiment, with which he participated in the campaign against Napoleon in 1815. Back in Oldenburg, Wardenburg began the systematic development of a modern, professional military. This included, above all, the establishment of a military school including a military library (the Grand Ducal Oldenburg Military Library) for the training of non-commissioned officers and officers. Wardenburg was also responsible for the construction of the infantry barracks at the Pferdemarkt, which today houses parts of the city administration. Wardenburg's plans were repeatedly restricted by Peter Friedrich Ludwig's strict austerity.

In 1816, he married Helene Elisabeth Wilhelmine Hegeler (1792–1872). The marriage remained childless.

With the accession of Grand Duke Paul Friedrich August in 1829, a new phase in Oldenburg's military affairs began, as the new ruler himself was very interested in military affairs. On December 31 of that year, Wardenburg was promoted to major general. In 1834, in accordance with the Federal War Constitution of 1820/21, a military convention was concluded between the Grand Duchy and the Hanseatic cities of Hamburg, Lübeck, and Bremen. The Oldenburg-Hanseatic Brigade was subsequently formed from troop contingents from all four contracting parties. The Oldenburg Half-Brigade consisted of two infantry regiments established by Wardenburg, as well as an artillery unit. Wardenburg subsequently became the brigade's first commander, which he led until his death on 29 May 1838.

In addition to his military activities, Wardenburg also worked as a researcher and military historian. His collections, for example, of finds from old fortifications, later formed the basis for the Grand Ducal Collection of Antiquities and the Museum of Natural History and Prehistory (now the State Museum for Nature and Man). He authored several military-historical studies, including one on the regiment's participation in the 1815 Summer Campaign.

Wardenburg's estate is housed in the Lower Saxony State Archives (Oldenburg branch), and his documentation on the Oldenburg Regiment's participation in France is housed in the Oldenburg State Library. Wardenburg Street in Oldenburg was named in his honour.

== Bibliography ==
- Adam Levin Wardenburg: Leben des General-majors W. G. F. Wardenburg. Herausgegeben von einem Bruder des Verstorbenen. 1842. Digitised here
- Ludwig von Weltzien: Militärische Studien aus Oldenburgs Vorzeit und Geschichte des Oldenburgischen Contingents. Oldenburg 1858. Digitised here
- Johann Ludwig Mosle: Aus dem Leben des Generals Wardenburg. Oldenburg 1863. Digitised here
- August Mutzenbecher (1896). "Wardenburg, Wilhelm Gustav Friedrich" . Allgemeine Deutsche Biographie (in German). Vol. 41. Leipzig: Duncker & Humblot. pp. 167–169.
- Hans Friedl: Wardenburg, Wilhelm Gustav Friedrich, Generalmajor. In: Hans Friedl u. a. (Hrsg.): Biographisches Handbuch zur Geschichte des Landes Oldenburg. Hrsg. im Auftrag der Oldenburgischen Landschaft. Isensee, Oldenburg 1992, ISBN 3-89442-135-5, S. 778–780.
- o. V.: Wilhelm Gustav Friedrich Wardenburg (1781-1838). Oldenburgischer Soldat, Altertumsforscher und Sammler. Oldenburg 1981.
