= Anna Handzlová =

Czech orienteering competitor (1946–2020)

Medal record

Women's orienteering

Representing Czechoslovakia

World Championships
Bronze medal – third place	1972 Jičín	Relay
Bronze medal – third place	1974 Viborg	Relay

Anna Gavendová-Handzlová (July 4, 1946, Třinec – May 10, 2020, Třinec) was an orienteering competitor who competed for Czechoslovakia. At the 1972 World Orienteering Championships in Jičín she placed 14th in the individual competition, and won a bronze medal in the relay, together with Naďa Mertová and Renata Vlachová. At the 1974 World Orienteering Championships in Viborg she placed 12th in the individual race, and won a bronze medal in the relay, together with Dana Procházková and Renata Vlachová.
