= 1974 World Orienteering Championships =

1974 edition of the World Orienteering Championships

- Host city: Viborg
- Country: Denmark
- Events: 4

The 1974 World Orienteering Championships, the 5th World Orienteering Championships, were held in Viborg, Denmark, 20–22 September 1974.

The championships had four events; individual contests for men and women, and relays for men and women.

== Medalists ==
Event	Gold		Silver		Bronze	
Men's individual	Bernt Frilén (SWE)	1.35.48	Jan Fjærestad (NOR)	1.40.45	Eystein Weltzien (NOR)	1.42.32
Women's individual	Mona Nørgaard (DEN)	1.03.43	Kristin Cullman (SWE)	1.06.37	Outi Borgenström (FIN)	1.09.11
Men's relay	Sweden (SWE): Rolf Pettersson; Gunnar Öhlund; Arne Johansson; Bernt Frilén	4.49.27	Finland (FIN): Hannu Mäkirinta; Markku Salminen; Risto Nuuros; Seppo Väli-Klemelä	5.05.26	Norway (NOR): Svein Jacobsen; Jan Fjærestad; Ivar Formo; Eystein Weltzien	5.08.58
Women's relay	Sweden (SWE): Birgitta Larsson; Monica Andersson; Kristin Cullman	2.51.36	Norway (NOR): Kristin Danielsen; Ingrid Hadler; Linda Verde	2.51.48	Czechoslovakia (TCH): Dana Procházková; Anna Hanzlová; Renata Vlachová	3.01.45

== Results ==
=== Men's individual ===
WOC 1974 – Individual – Men (15.9 km)
Rank	Competitor	Nation	Time
1st place, gold medalist(s)	Bernt Frilén	Sweden	1:35:48
2nd place, silver medalist(s)	Jan Fjærestad	Norway	1:40:45
3rd place, bronze medalist(s)	Eystein Weltzien	Norway	1:42:32
4	Risto Nuuros	Finland	1:43:00
5	Arne Johansson	Sweden	1:43:27
6	Svein Jacobsen	Norway	1:43:36
7	Dieter Hulliger	Switzerland	1:43:37
8	Stefan Persson	Sweden	1:44:05
9	Ivar Formo	Norway	1:44:19
9	Henrik Lövhammer	Sweden	1:44:19

=== Women's individual ===
WOC 1974 – Individual – Women (7.9 km)
Rank	Competitor	Nation	Time
1st place, gold medalist(s)	Mona Nørgaard	Denmark	1:03:43
2nd place, silver medalist(s)	Kristin Cullman	Sweden	1:06:37
3rd place, bronze medalist(s)	Outi Borgenström	Finland	1:09:11
4	Linda Verde	Norway	
5	Renata Vlachová	Czechoslovakia	
6	Liisa Veijalainen	Finland	
7	Monica Andersson	Sweden	
8	Vibeke Bøkevig	Denmark	
9	Annelies Dütsch	Czechoslovakia	
10	Inger Thelandersson	Sweden	
