= András Hegedűs (orienteer) =

Hungarian orienteering competitor (1950–2022)

Medal record

Men's orienteering

Representing Hungary

World Championships
Bronze medal – third place	1972 Jičín	Relay

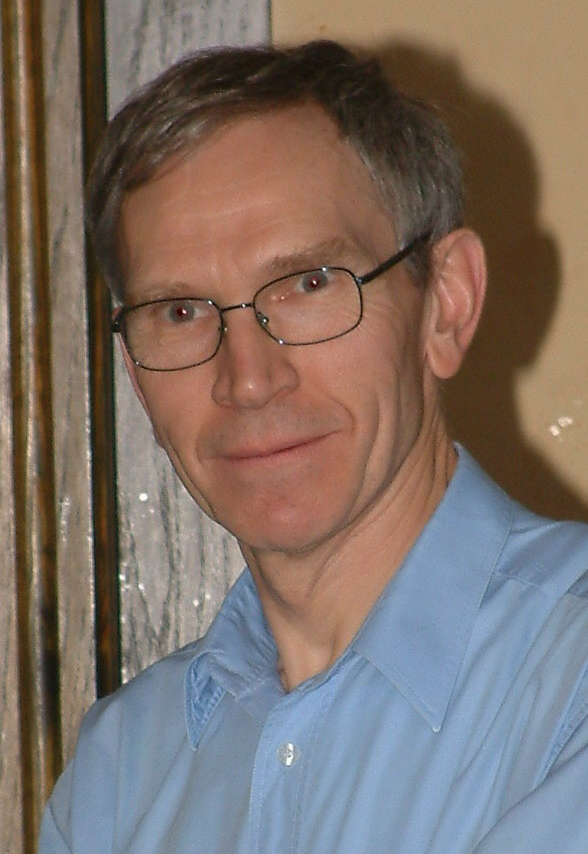
András Hegedűs in 2005

András Hegedűs (12 July 1950 – 20 February 2022) was a Hungarian orienteering competitor. He received a bronze medal in the relay event at the 1972 World Orienteering Championships in Jičín, together with Zoltán Boros, János Sőtér and Géza Vajda.
