= Oskar von Hardegg =

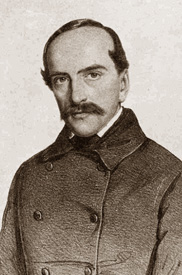
- Hardegg in 1866
- Born: 19 October 1815; Ludwigsburg, Ludwigsburg, Württemberg
- Died: 25 September 1877 (aged 61); Stuttgart, Württemberg, Germany
- Military career
- Allegiance: Württemberg
- Branch: Royal Württemberg Army
- Service years: 1831 – 1867
- Rank: Officer
- Conflicts: Austro-Prussian War: Battle of Werbach

Oskar von Hardegg (19 October 1815 – 25 September 1877) was a Württemberger officer who was notable for being the commanding Württemberger figure at the Battle of Werbach during the Austro-Prussian War.

== Biography ==
Hardegg was the fifth son of the chief medical officer and personal physician Johann Georg von Hardegg in Ludwigsburg. His brother was the military writer Julius von Hardegg.

He grew up in his home town, attended the Lyceum there and, from March 1831, the Ludwigsburg Officers Training Institute. In April 1834 he left the educational institution as a lieutenant and joined the 7th Infantry Regiment of the Württemberg Army in Stuttgart. After some time he was transferred to the Pioneer Corps, in which he was promoted to Oberleutnant in 1842. He then joined the general staff and in 1847 advanced to the rank of captain . When Generalleutnant Moriz von Miller took over the War Office on 2 July 1850; he made Hardegg his adjutant. In the course of his work in the Ministry of War, Hardegg was promoted to major in 1850, lieutenant colonel in 1852 and promoted to colonel in 1856. In order to be able to gain practical experience again, Hardegg now asked to be transferred to a line infantry regiment and was appointed commander of the 4th Infantry Regiment. He served the regiment from 22 September 1856 to 27 April 1857. He was then promoted to major general, Hardegg became brigade commander and lieutenant governor of Ulm. In 1865 he was promoted to lieutenant general, division commander and governor of Stuttgart. After the resignation of Minister of War Kuno von Wiederd on 5 May 1866, he took over the management of the Ministry of War.

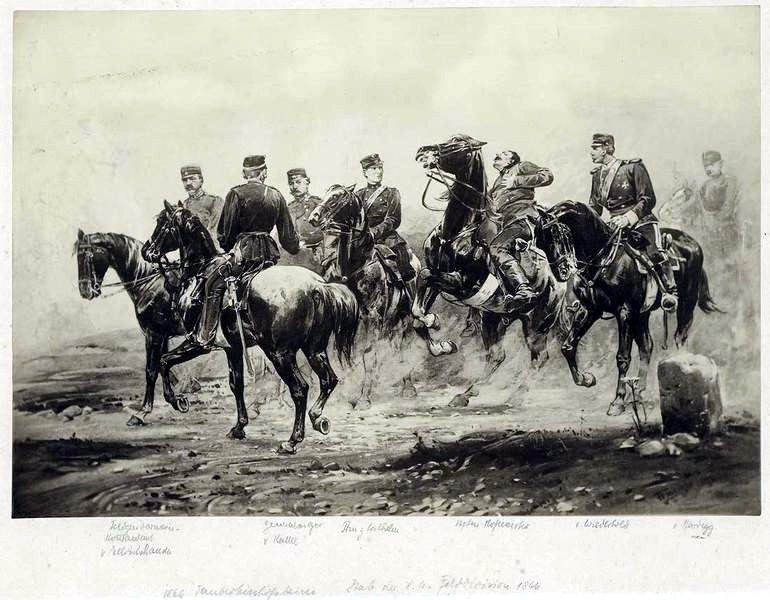
Oskar von Hardegg on the right in the background with the staff of the Royal Württemberg field division in Battle of Tauberbischofsheim

At the outbreak of the Austro-Prussian War in 1866, as commander of the field division, he led the troops into the Battle of Tauberbischofsheim. During the war, he had a dispute with his Bavarian counterpart, Siegmund von Pranckh over whether to use the new Prussian system or the Swiss Guard System. Knowing the danger the lack of centralization the Southern German States, in October 1866, Hardegg sent a memorandum to Baden, Württemberg, Hesse-Darmstadt, and Bavaria to work on standardizing the equipment, organization, and training of their armies. After the end of the war, he returned to the War Ministry in Stuttgart and retired in April 1867 when the Luxembourg question occurred.

In addition to his professional and specialist knowledge, Hardegg cultivated music with a special passion, both as a pianist and as a composer. One of his most popular compositions was the song Schwarzes Band.

== Family ==
Oskar von Hardegg married Ottilie Kausler, the daughter of Colonel von Kausler. The marriage produced two children. The daughter married the Bavarian colonel Freiherr von Freyberg-Eisenberg in Dillingen, Hardegg's son became a captain and commander of the 8th Württemberg Infantry Regiment No. 126.

== Awards ==
- Order of the Crown, 1851
- Friedrich Order, 1864
- Military Merit Order, 18 August 1866 (Knight's Cross)
