= Zoltán Boros =

Hungarian orienteering competitor (1948–2025)

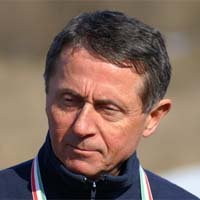
- Boros in 2006

Medal record

Men's orienteering

Representing Hungary

World Championships
Bronze medal – third place	1972 Jičín	Relay

Zoltán Boros (28 June 1948 – 30 January 2025) was a Hungarian orienteering competitor. He received a bronze medal in the relay event at the 1972 World Orienteering Championships in Jičín, together with János Sőtér, Géza Vajda and András Hegedűs. At the 1974 World Championships in Viborg he placed sixth in the relay with the Hungarian team. Boros died on 30 January 2025, at the age of 76.
