= 1976 World Orienteering Championships =

1976 edition of the World Orienteering Championships

- Host city: Aviemore
- Country: Great Britain
- Events: 4

The 1976 World Orienteering Championships, the 6th World Orienteering Championships, were held in Aviemore, Scotland, 24–26 September 1976.

The championships had four events; individual contests for men and women, and relays for men and women.

== Medalists ==
Event	Gold		Silver		Bronze	
Men's individual	Egil Johansen (NOR)	1.31.22	Rolf Pettersson (SWE)	1.33.15	Svein Jacobsen (NOR)	1.33.49
Women's individual	Liisa Veijalainen (FIN)	1.08.12	Kristin Cullman (SWE)	1.10.31	Anne Lundmark (SWE)	1.11.44
Men's relay	Sweden (SWE): Erik Johansson; Gert Pettersson; Arne Johansson; Rolf Pettersson	4.10.41	Norway (NOR): Jan Fjærestad; Øystein Halvorsen; Svein Jacobsen; Egil Johansen	4.19.08	Finland (FIN): Hannu Mäkirinta; Markku Salminen; Matti Mäkinen; Kimmo Rauhamäki	4.23.41
Women's relay	Sweden (SWE): Ingrid Ohlsson; Kristin Cullman; Anne Lundmark	2.42.46	Finland (FIN): Outi Borgenström; Sinikka Kukkonen; Liisa Veijalainen	2.43.05	Hungary (HUN): Iren Rostas; Magdolna Kovacs; Sarolta Monspart	2.49.22
