= Bockhorn, Lower Saxony =

Bockhorn
- Municipality
- Flag Coat of arms

- Location of Bockhorn within Friesland district
- Interactive map of Bockhorn
- Location within Germany Location within Lower Saxony
- Coordinates: 53°24′N 8°1′E
- Country: Germany
- State: Lower Saxony
- District: Friesland
- Subdivisions: 13 districts

Government
  - Mayor (2019–24): Thorsten Krettek (CDU)

Area
  - Total: 77.15 km^{2} (29.79 sq mi)
- Elevation: 6 m (20 ft)

Population (2025-12-31)
  - Total: 8,791
  - Density: 113.9/km^{2} (295.1/sq mi)
- Time zone: UTC+01:00 (CET)
  - Summer (DST): UTC+02:00 (CEST)
- Postal codes: 26345
- Dialling codes: 04453
- Vehicle registration: FRI
- Website: www.bockhorn.de

Bockhorn (German pronunciation: [ˈbɔkhɔʁn]) is a municipality in the district of Friesland, in Lower Saxony, Germany. It is approximately 15 km southwest of Wilhelmshaven, and 30 km northwest of Oldenburg.

== Persons from Bockhorn ==
- Diedrich Uhlhorn (1764-1832), inventor
- Ludwig von Weltzien (1815-1870), prussian lieutenant general
