= Lennart Carlström =

Swedish orienteering competitor

Medal record

Men's orienteering

Representing Sweden

World Championships
Gold medal – first place	1972 Dosky	Relay

Lennart Carlström (born 3 July 1943) is a Swedish orienteering competitor. He was the Relay World Champion from 1972, as a member of the Swedish winning team in the World Orienteering Championships in Jicin, Czechoslovakia.
