= Oldenburg-Hanseatic Brigade =

1800s German military formation

The Oldenburg-Hanseatic Brigade (German: Oldenburgisch-Hansetische Brigade) was a mixed brigade of the army of the German Confederation (the Bundesheer), which was made up of contingents from the Grand Duchy of Oldenburg and the Free Cities of Bremen, Hamburg and Lübeck

== Origin ==
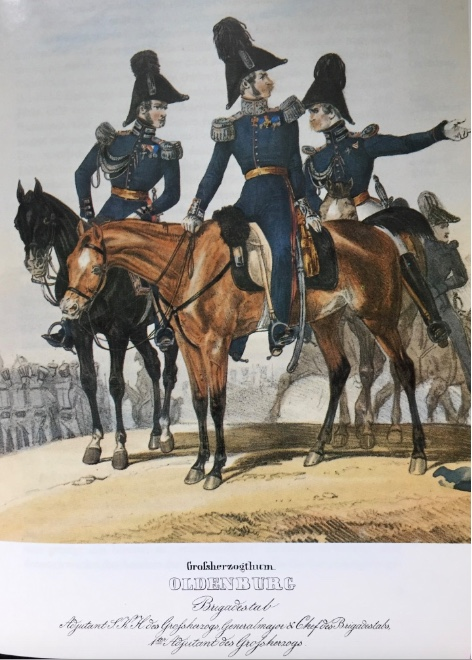
Grand Dutchy of Oldenburg - Brigade Staff ((Hanseatic Brigade)

The Federal War Constitution of 1821 stipulated that the German Federal Army should be composed of contingents from all 35 member states. Troop strength was based on the population of the member state and amounted to one percent for the main contingent and one-third of a percent for the reserve troops. The ratio of the branches of service was also fixed, although each member state could circumvent this by substituting, for example, an expensive cavalryman for several times the number of infantrymen. According to the structure laid down in 1821, the contingents from the federal states of Oldenburg, Hanover, Brunswick, Holstein-Lauenburg, Mecklenburg-Schwerin, and Mecklenburg-Strelitz, together with the free imperial cities of Hamburg, Bremen, and Lübeck, formed the X Army Corps of the Federal Army, with the Oldenburg and Hanseatic troops assigned to the 3rd Brigade of the 2nd Division.

The Oldenburg contingent formed the Oldenburg Half-Brigade, consisting of the Oldenburg Artillery (founded 1820), with a total in 1821 of fifteen cannons including eight modern 6-pounders, and the Oldenburg Infantry, initially with one regiment of four battalions, and after the reorganization in 1829/30 with two regiments of two battalions each. The brigade was completed by the Hanseatic Half-Brigade of the imperial cities of Hamburg, Bremen and Lübeck. At full strength in the 1840s the Lübeck and Bremen contingents consisted of a joint battalion of infantry and a half-squadron of cavalry each while Hamburg provided two battalions of infantry and two squadrons of dragoons.

== The Brigade Convention of 1834 ==
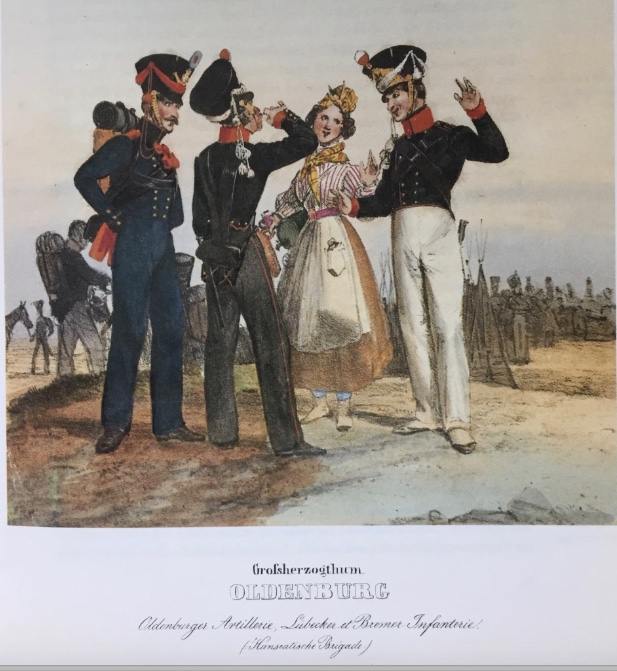
Grand Duchy of Oldenburg – Oldenburg Artillery, Lübeck + Bremen Infantry (Hanseatic Brigade)

Due to regional and particularly historical differences, the German Confederation found it difficult to standardise equipment, armament and training for the various federal contingents. To at least partially achieve this, the militarily minded ruler of Oldenburg, Augustus I, succeeded in persuading Hamburg, Bremen, and Lübeck to agree to a Brigade Convention. In a significant prestige gain for Oldenburg, this instrument standardised armament and training under Oldenburg's supreme command. Moreover, Oldenburg also assumed the obligation under the Federal War Regulations to provide artillery (one gun per 1,000 infantry) for the imperial cities, whose contingents consisted only of infantry and cavalry. The first commander of this unit was Major General Wilhelm Gustav Friedrich Wardenburg, who had proven himself in the development of the Oldenburg Infantry. The convention was ratified in 1835.

To train future commanders, the Oldenburg Military School (housed in a school building at the Pferdemarkt from 1838 onwards) was reorganized as a Brigade Military School in 1836. Under its commander, Johann Ludwig Mosle, it trained the brigade's officer candidates and warrant officers in two classes. In 1837, the brigade held its first maneuver. From September 24 to October 8, 1843, the brigade joined the entire X Army Corps for the only time in a major exercise at Lüneburg that included 25,000 soldiers.

In order to meet the artillery requirements of the Federal War Constitution, the Brigade Convention was supplemented in 1842 by a further agreement. This stipulated that the Oldenburg artillery, which had previously consisted of one battery of eight cannons, would be increased to two batteries of six cannons each. The supplementary agreement came into force in 1843, though the Oldenburg batteries were organized as companies. The Oldenburg Artillery received its own barracks on Ofener Straße and a firing range on the parade ground at Donnerschwee.

To standardize its infantry's armament, Oldenburg had already procured 2,000 new flintlock muskets and 800 flintlock rifles from the Württemberg Rifle Factory in 1830. In 1841, the brigade determined to change from flint ignition to percussion, and both Oldenburg's newer weapons and the Hanseatic Half-brigade's old Napoleonic English muskets were converted. At the same time, the brigade ordered 6,000 percussion rifles from Crause on the Brunswick ribbed-ball principle. By 1847, Oldenburg began converting their existing weapons to the tige system, and the other states did the same in quick succession; they also ordered a small number of new weapons. From 1861 onwards, the states rearmed with the Dreyse needle gun.

== Special Features of the Oldenburg Half-Brigade ==
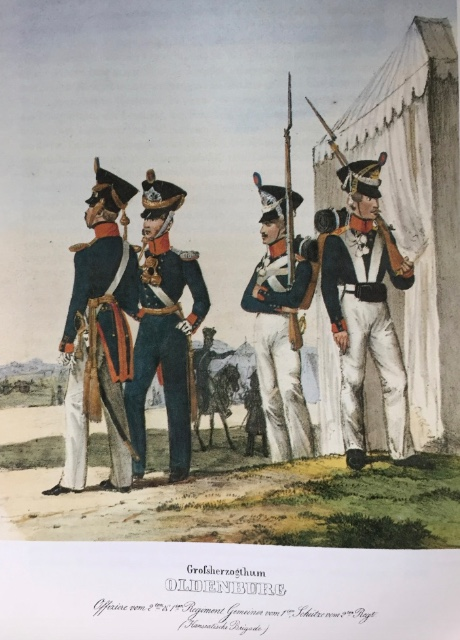
Grand Duchy of Oldenburg – Officers of 1st and 2nd Regiment, Private of 1st and Rifleman of 2nd Regiment (Hanseatic Brigade)

In 1848, the Oldenburg Half-Brigade was reorganized in accordance with the Federal War Constitution. This was prompted by the Oldenburg State Parliament, which evaluated the Oldenburg federal contingent and concluded that Oldenburg should provide four independent battalions of line infantry, a further battalion of light infantry, and a cavalry regiment alongside the artillery corps.

To fulfill this requirement, the two infantry regiments were disbanded and the four battalions became independent. In 1849, the Oldenburg Cavalry Regiment and the Light Battalion were established, stationed in the Oldenburg exclave of Birkenfeld, where until then only reserve units had been stationed. Starting in 1848/49, the artillery underwent various reorganizations and acquired new guns (including from the German Navy, which had been disbanded in 1851/52).

In 1850, when the Oldenburg State Parliament refused to subsequently approve the reorganization, the 4th Line Infantry Battalion was disbanded and the 3rd Battalion was assigned to the reserve. In 1855, the number of line battalions was reduced to two, and the 5th (Light) Battalion was disbanded. Although the number of units decreased, the overall manpower remained almost unchanged and was further increased in 1857 with the establishment of a pioneer platoon. By 1866, Oldenburg provided an infantry regiment of three battalions, two artillery batteries (one with rifled 6-pounder Krupp guns), and a cavalry regiment.

== Special Features of the Hanseatic Half-Brigade ==
The federal contingents of the imperial cities competed with the respective citizen military units of the imperial cities, such as the Hamburg Citizen Militia. As a rule, they were inferior to these in terms of equipment, training, and popular prestige. After the reorganisation of 1851, Lübeck and Bremen abolished their cavalry contingents and each contributed a light infantry battalion to the brigade.

== Operational history ==
In addition to the first maneuver in 1837 and the major maneuver of the X Army Corps in 1843 in Lüneburg, the Oldenburg-Hanseatic Brigade also participated in the campaign of the federal troops during the First Schleswig War of 1848/49. The 1st Regiment and the 2nd Battalion of the 2nd Regiment of the Oldenburg Half-Brigade participated in the Battles of Nybøl and Dybbøl. The brigade's artillery was deployed against Danish naval units on 27/28 May 1848, in the Flensburg Fjord, and against Danish gunboats on 8 June, near Arnkiels-Oere, during the 1849 campaign. The contingents of the imperial cities did not participate in combat, but were deployed as occupation troops in Kiel, Rendsburg, and southern Schleswig.

The Oldenburg-Hanseatic Brigade did not participate in the Second Schleswig War. Only a portion of the artillery was kept ready around Heppens to fight the Danish fleet, and it conducted a few exercises for this purpose.

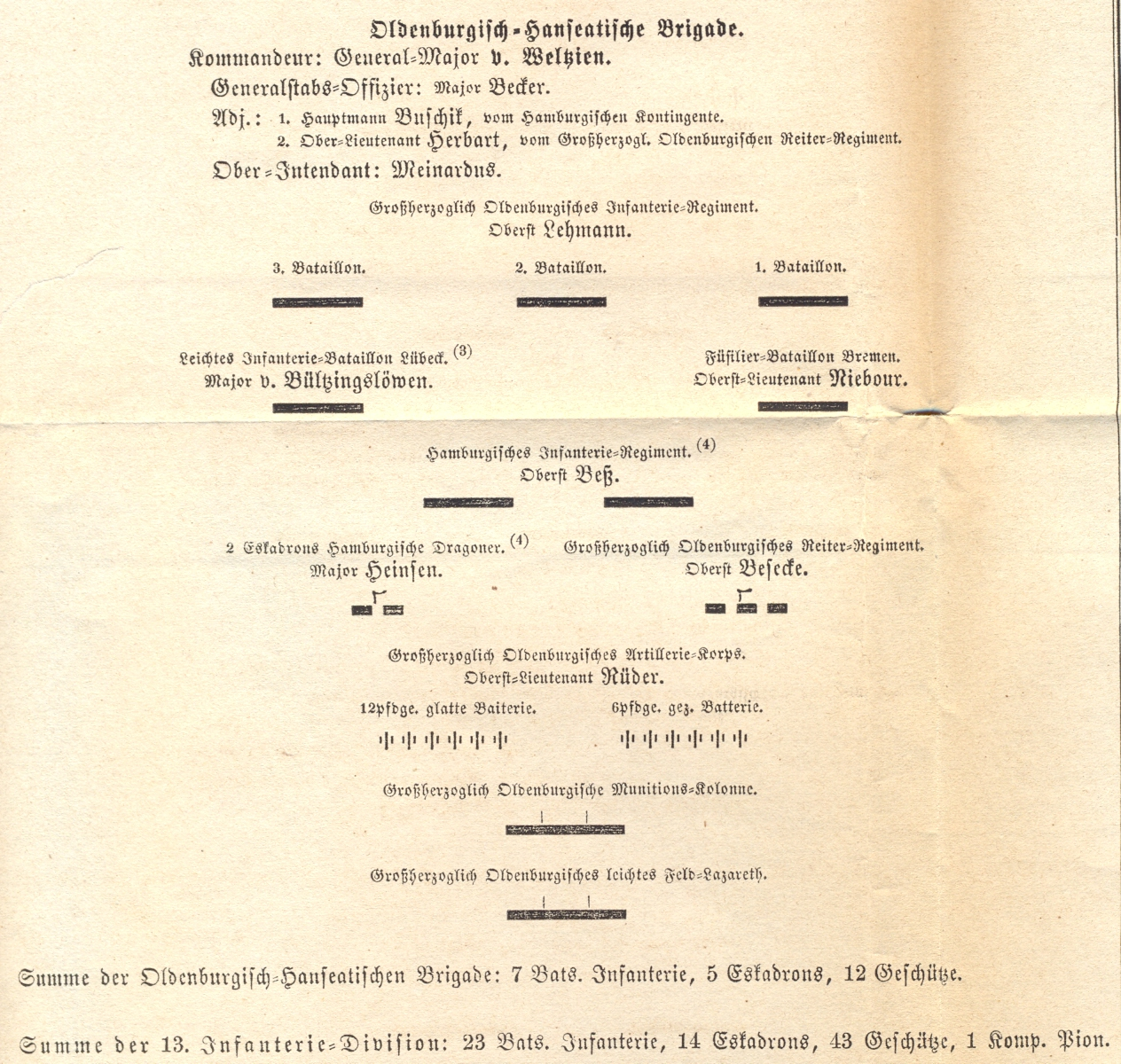
Oldenburg-Hanseatic Brigade under Major General Weltzien in the 13th Infantry Division of the Prussian Army of the Main, 1866

During the Austro-Prussian War of 1866, all the states constituting the Oldenburg-Hanseatic Brigade sided with Prussia against Austria. The Brigade was therefore assigned to the Prussian Army of the Main under Lieutenant General von Manteuffel, serving in August Karl von Goeben's 13th Division. The Oldenburg troops were given a farewell by Grand Duke Peter II on 16 July 1866, in the presence of the entire Grand Ducal family. The brigade was deployed in the battles of Werbach and Gerchsheim on 24/25 July. On 27 July, two batteries of the Brigade Artillery took part in the Battle of Würzburg and, in the presence of the Grand Duke of Oldenburg, shelled the fortress of Marienberg, though they also hit parts of the city centre.

== Dissolution of the Brigade ==
After the dissolution of the German Confederation and the founding of the North German Confederation in 1866/67, the member states ceded their military sovereignty to Prussia through military conventions, and their federal contingents became part of the Prussian Army. Prussia concluded a military convention with Lübeck and Bremen on 27 June 1867: a convention with Oldenburg followed on 15 July, and with Hamburg on 23 July. The troops of the former Oldenburg-Hanseatic Brigade were dispersed through the newly organised Prussian IX and X Corps.

The Oldenburg Infantry, being sufficiently strong in numbers, was converted into the Oldenburgisches Infanterie-Regiment Nr. 91 without reorganization and incorporated into the Prussian Army. The artillery was assigned to the Prussian Field Artillery Regiment No. 10., and the cavalry to the 19th (Oldenburg) Dragoons. The contingents of the imperial cities were too small to form their own regiments, so they were reinforced by Prussian troops. Eventually, a regular Prussian regiment was formed for each imperial city, incorporating the former federal contingents.

- Infanterie-Regiment "Bremen" (1. Hanseatisches) Nr. 75 (formed in 1866, absorbing the Bremen infantry battalion as its 1st Battalion in 1867)
- Infanterie-Regiment "Hamburg" (2. Hanseatisches) Nr. 76 (formed in 1866, absorbing the personnel of the Hamburg and Lübeck infantry in 1867)
- Infanterie-Regiment "Lübeck" (3. Hanseatisches) Nr. 162 (formed in 1897 from detachments of IR75 and IR76)

== Commanders ==
Rank	Name	Dates
Generalmajor	Wilhelm Gustav Friedrich Wardenburg	30 October 1821 to 29 May 1838
-	vacant	29 May 1838 to 1 May 1839
Generalmajor	Ludwig Dietrich Eugen von Gayl	1 May 1839 to 13 July 1848
Generalmajor	Wilhelm von Ranzow	13 July 1848 to 27 January 1860
Generalmajor	Ludwig von Weltzien	27 January 1860 to 15 July 1867 (Disbanded)

== Bibliography ==
- Eckert, Heinrich Ambros; Monten, Dietrich (1840). Das deutsche Bundesheer in charakteristischen Gruppen, vol. 2 (in German). Würzburg.
- Embree, Michael (2015). Too little, too late: the campaign in West and South Germany, June-July 1866. Solihull, West Midlands, England: Helion & Company. ISBN 9781909384507.
- von Finckh, Eduard (1881). Geschichte des Oldenburgischen Infanterie-Regiments Nr. 91, vormals Großherzoglich Oldenburgischen Infanterie-Regiments von seiner Errichtung bis zur Gegenwart (1813–1880). Berlin: Mittler.
- Gilly de Montaut, Wilhelm (1981). Festung und Garnison Oldenburg (in German). Oldenburg: Holzberg. ISBN 3-87358-132-9.
- Gőtz, Hans-Dieter (1996). Milita̋rgewehre und Pistolen der deutschen Staaten, 1800-1870. Stuttgart: Motorbuch Verlag. ISBN 3879435332.
- von Jacobi, Karl (1847). Das zehnte Armee-Corps des deutschen Bundesheeres: Kriegs-Verfassung und Verwaltung seiner Contingente (in German). Hahn.
- von Jacobi, Karl (1858). Das zehnte armee-corps des deutschen bundesheeres : kriegs-verfassung und verwaltung seiner contingente ; auf grundlage amtlicher mittheilungen (in German) (Second ed.). Hannover: Hahn.
- Lombard, Andreas (2014). "Haus und Land. Das Herzogtum und Großherzogtum Oldenburg von 1773 bis 1918". Geschichte des Oldenburger Landes - Herzogtum, Großherzogtum Freistaat (in German). Münster: Aschendorff Verlag. ISBN 978-3-402-12942-5.
- Sager, Wilhelm (2003). Heere zwischen den Meeren: Heeres- und Kriegsgeschichte Schleswig-Holsteins. Husum: Husum Druck- und Verlagsges. ISBN 3-89876-113-4.
- Spilhaus, Ludolph (1840). Das Exerciren der Infanterie der Oldenburgisch-Hanseatischen Brigade (in German). Lübeck.
- Sutherland, Stuart (2010). The organization of the German State Forces in 1866. Solihull: Helion & Co. Limited. ISBN 9781906033682.
- Mayer, Moritz (1874). Geschichte des Hamburgischen Contingents von seinem Stiftungstag 1814 bis zu seiner Auflösung 1867: nebst einem alphabetischen Namens-Verzeichniss sämmtlicher Offiziere, Aerzte und Beamten des Contingents in der Zeitperiode von 1814 bis 1867 (in German). Hamburg: O. Meissner.
