= Anne Lundmark =

Swedish orienteering competitor

Medal record

Women's orienteering

Representing Sweden

World Championships
Gold medal – first place	1976 Aviemore	Relay
Bronze medal – third place	1976 Aviemore	Individual

Anne Lundmark (born 1949) is a Swedish orienteering competitor. She is Relay World Champion from 1976, as a member of the Swedish winning team. She won a bronze medal in the individual contest at the 1976 World Orienteering Championships, behind Liisa Veijalainen and Kristin Cullman.
