= Renata Vlachová =

Czech orienteering competitor

Medal record

Women's orienteering

Representing Czechoslovakia

World Championships
Bronze medal – third place	1972 Jičín	Relay
Bronze medal – third place	1974 Viborg	Relay

Renata Vlachová (born 11 December 1944) is a Czech former orienteering competitor who competed for Czechoslovakia. At the 1972 World Orienteering Championships in Jičín she placed 11th in the individual competition, and won a bronze medal in the relay, together with Naďa Mertová and Anna Handzlová. At the 1974 World Orienteering Championships in Viborg she placed fifth in the individual race, and won a bronze medal in the relay, together with Dana Procházková and Anna Handzlová.
