= Diedrich Uhlhorn =

German engineer and inventor (1764–1837)

- Born: 3 June 1764; Bockhorn, Holy Roman Empire
- Died: 1837 (aged 72-73); Grevenbroich, Rhein-Kreis Neuss, North Rhine-Westphalia, Kingdom of Prussia
- Occupations: Engineer, mechanic, engineer

Diedrich Uhlhorn (3 June 1764 – 1837) was a German engineer, mechanic and inventor.

== Life ==
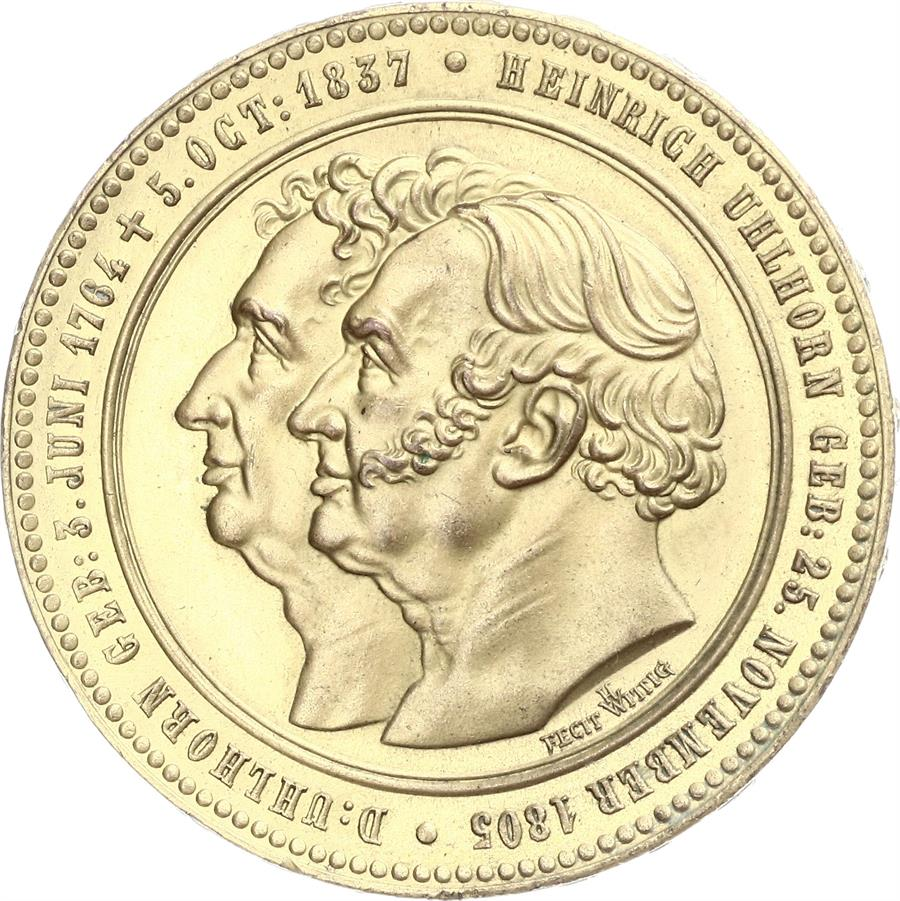
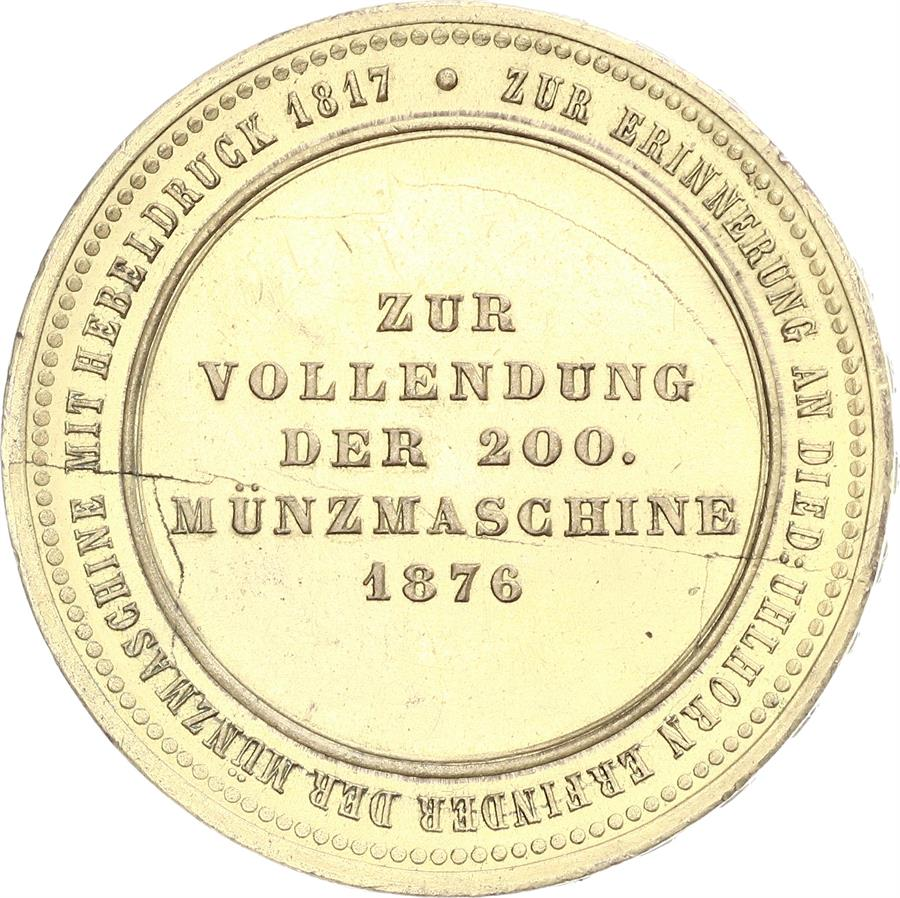
Medal Diedrich and Johann Heinrich Uhlhorn (son of D.):
“On the completion of the 200th minting machine in 1876 /
To commemorate the D:Uhlhorn invention of the lever-operated minting machine in 1817”
(Wittig, Grevenbroich 1876, 41,5 mm, gilt bronze)

Uhlhorn was an engineer, mechanic and inventor, who invented in 1817 the first mechanical tachometer. Between 1817 and 1830 he was inventor of the Presse Monétaire (level coin press known as Uhlhorn Press) which bears his name. He was married.

== Awards ==
- Order of the Red Eagle

== See also ==
- List of German inventors and discoverers
