= Géza Vajda =

Hungarian orienteering competitor

Medal record

Men's orienteering

Representing Hungary

World Championships
Bronze medal – third place	1972 Jičín	Relay

Géza Vajda is a Hungarian orienteering competitor. He received a bronze medal in the relay event at the 1972 World Orienteering Championships in Jičín, together with Zoltán Boros, János Sőtér and András Hegedűs.
