= Naďa Mertová =

Czechoslovak orienteer

Medal record

Women's orienteering

Representing Czechoslovakia

World Championships
Bronze medal – third place	1972 Jičín	Relay

Naďa Mertová is an orienteering competitor who competed for Czechoslovakia. At the 1972 World Orienteering Championships in Jičín she placed 10th in the individual competition, and won a bronze medal in the relay with the Czechoslovak team together with Renata Vlachová and Anna Hanzlová.
