= Linda Verde =

Norwegian orienteer

Medal record

Women's orienteering

Representing Norway

World Championships
Silver medal – second place	1974 Silkeborg	Relay

Nordic Championships
Gold medal – first place	1975 Nørre Snede	Relay
Bronze medal – third place	1980 Borlänge	Relay

Linda Verde (born 27 February 1950) is a Norwegian orienteering competitor. She received a silver medal at the 1974 World Orienteering Championships.

She became Nordic champion in 1975 with the Norwegian relay team.

== National championships ==
Linda Verde was the Norwegian champion seven times: She won the classic distance in 1974, 1975, and 1981, the ultra long distance in 1974, 1975, and 1977, and received a gold medal in night orienteering in 1979.
