= Audun Weltzien =

Norwegian orienteer (born 1983)

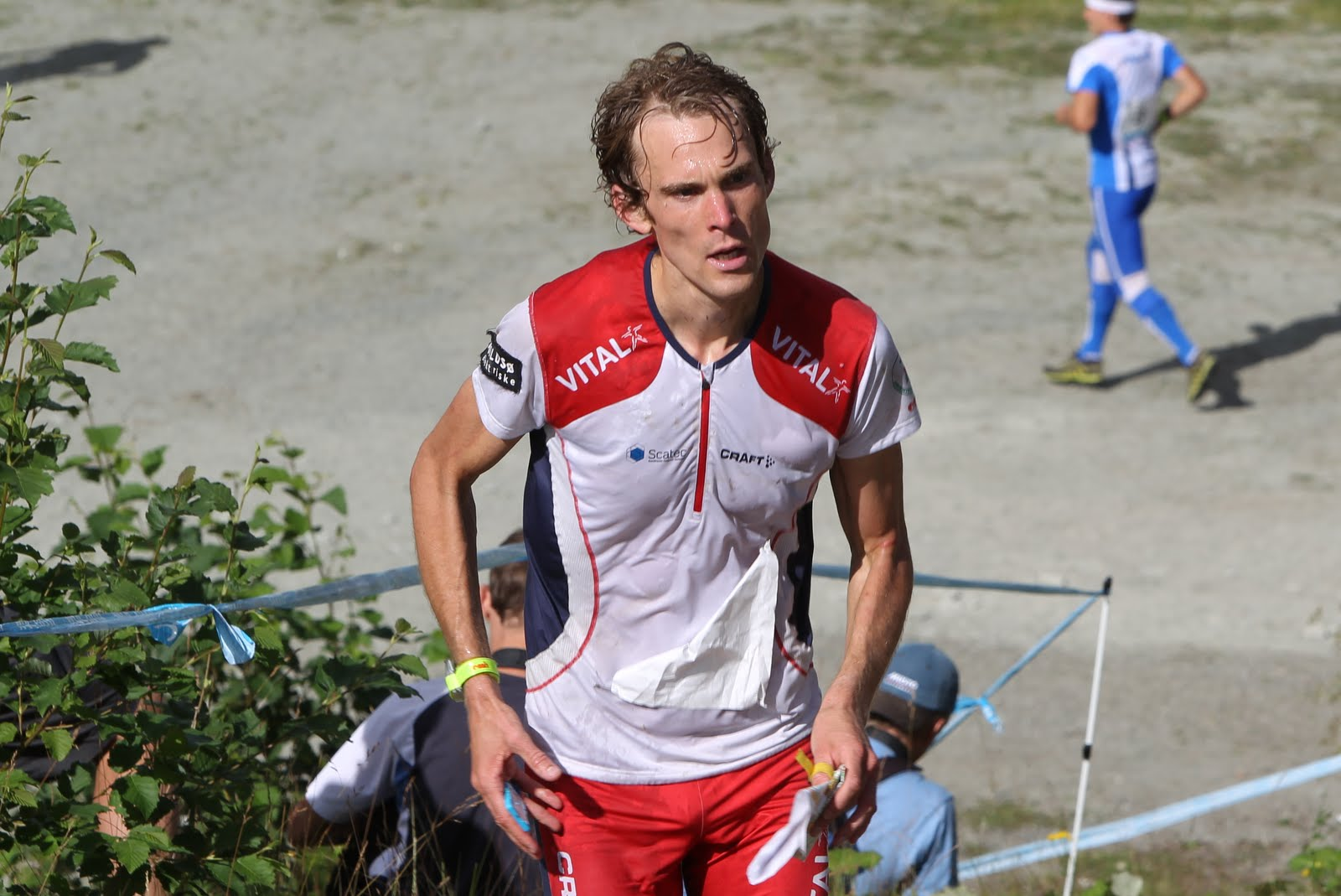

Medal record

Men's orienteering

Representing Norway

World Championships
Silver medal – second place	2010 Trondheim	Relay

Junior World Championships
Silver medal – second place	2003 Põlva	Relay

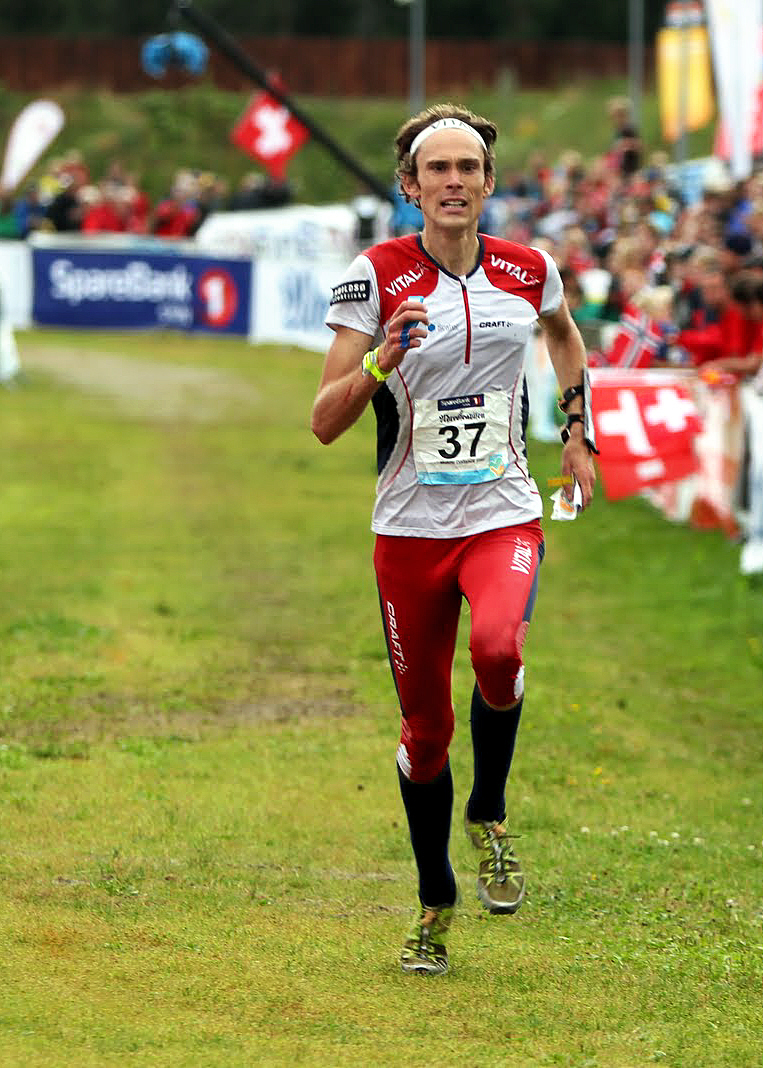
Audun Weltzien 2010 at World Orienteering Championships

Audun Hultgreen Weltzien (born 3 September 1983) is a Norwegian orienteering competitor.

He competed at the 2009 World Orienteering Championships in Miskolc, where he placed 19th in the middle distance, and participated on the Norwegian relay team. In 2003 he won a silver medal in the relay at the Junior World Orienteering Championships.

He represents the club IL Tyrving. He is a son of Eystein Weltzien and the older brother of Ingunn Weltzien.
