= Birgitta Larsson =

Swedish orienteering competitor

Personal information
- Born: 4 October 1941 (age 84)

Sport
- Sport: Orienteering
Medal record
Representing Sweden
World Championships
Gold medal – first place	1970 Friedrichroda	Relay
Silver medal – second place	1972 Doksy	Relay
Bronze medal – third place	1972 Doksy	Individual
Gold medal – first place	1974 Silkeborg	Relay

Birgitta Larsson (born 4 October 1941) is a Swedish orienteering competitor. She won two world titles as a member of Swedish relay teams in 1970 and 1974; in 1972 she won an individual bronze and a team silver medal. She continued winning medals at world championships through the 2000s in the masters category.

Larsson started competing in 1961. She has seven siblings, three of whom also compete in orienteering, together with her husband and 13–14 nephews and nieces. She is a cartographer by profession.
