= Von Jagow =

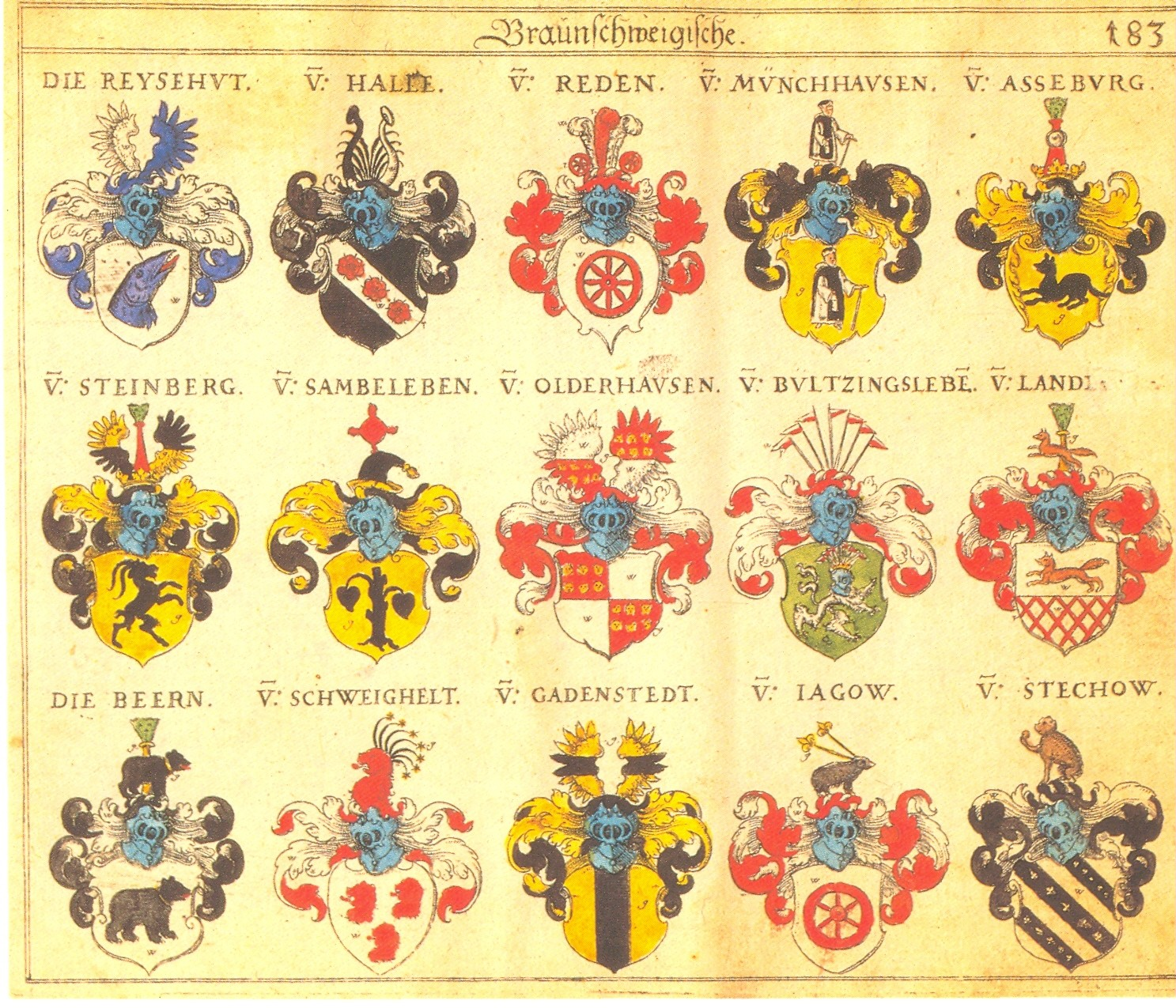
Jagow family coat of arms, among other noble families

The Jagow family is an old German noble family which originated from Altmark, Brandenburg. Members of the family held important political and military positions in the Kingdom of Prussia and later in the German Empire.

== Notable members ==
- Dietrich von Jagow, SA leader and ambassador to Hungary
- Friedrich Wilhelm von Jagow, Prussian general
- Gottlieb von Jagow, German foreign minister
- Matthias von Jagow, Brandenburg clergyman
