= Bernt Frilén =

Swedish orienteering competitor (1945–2019)

Personal information
- Born: 3 June 1945
- Died: 7 May 2019 (aged 73)

Sport
- Sport: Orienteering
Medal record
Men's orienteering
Representing Sweden
World Championships
Gold medal – first place	1972 Staré Splavy	Relay
Gold medal – first place	1974 Viborg	Individual
Gold medal – first place	1974 Viborg	Relay
Silver medal – second place	1970 Friedrichroda	Relay
Bronze medal – third place	1972 Staré Splavy	Individual

Bernt Frilén (3 June 1945 – 7 May 2019) was a Swedish orienteering competitor, winner of the 1974 Individual World Orienteering Championships. He also has an individual bronze medal from 1972. He was two times Relay World Champion, as a member of the Swedish winning teams in 1972 and 1974, as well as having a silver medal from 1970.
