= Ingunn Hultgreen Weltzien =

Norwegian orienteer

Medal record

Women's orienteering

Representing Norway

World Championships
Bronze medal – third place	2007 Kyiv	Relay

Junior World Championships
Gold medal – first place	2006 Druskininkai	Sprint

Ingunn Hultgreen Weltzien (born 19 May 1986) is a Norwegian orienteering competitor and cross-country skier.

She received a bronze medal in the relay event at the 2007 World Orienteering Championships in Kyiv, together with Marianne Andersen and Anne Margrethe Hausken. She became Junior World Champion in sprint in Druskininkai in 2006.

She represents the club IL Tyrving. She has a silver medal in the 3000 metres steeplechase at the 2008 Norwegian Championships, with the time 10:24.69 minutes, a personal best.

Ingunn Hultgreen Welzien is daughter of orienteering world champion (in relay) and cross-country skier Eystein Weltzien, and her mother, Wenche, has also been on the national orienteering team. She is a younger sister of Audun Weltzien.
