= Werbach =

- Municipality
- Coat of arms

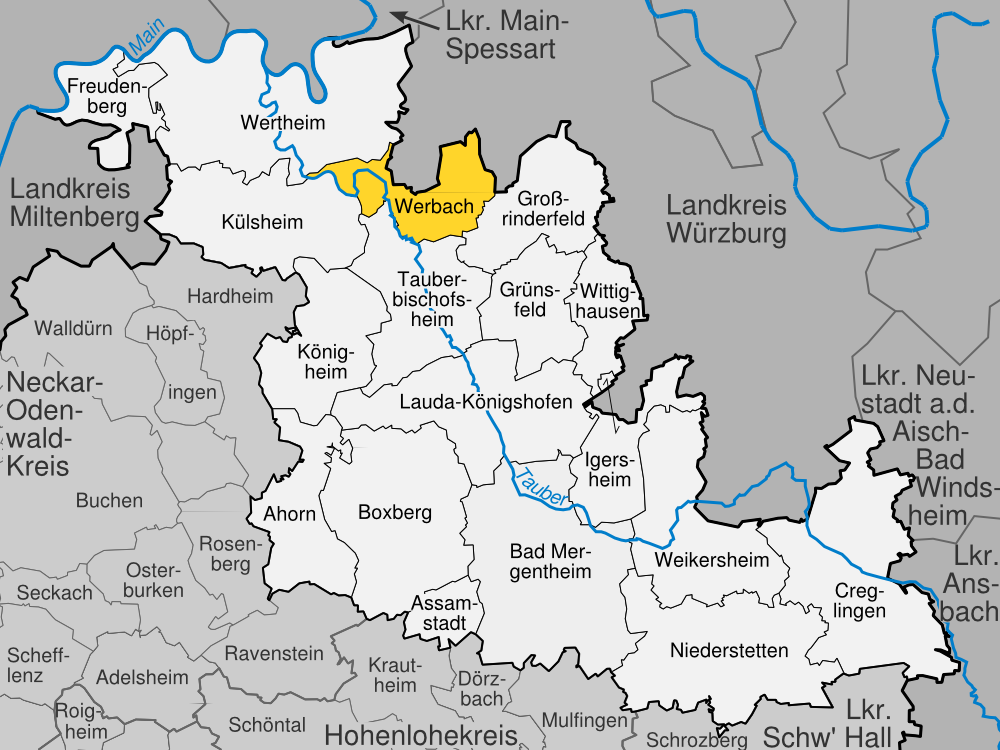
- Location of Werbach within Main-Tauber-Kreis district
- Interactive map of Werbach
- Location within Germany Location within Baden-Württemberg
- Coordinates: 49°40′09″N 09°38′26″E
- Country: Germany
- State: Baden-Württemberg
- Admin. region: Stuttgart
- District: Main-Tauber-Kreis

Government
  - Mayor (2023–31): Georg Wyrwoll

Area
  - Total: 43.18 km^{2} (16.67 sq mi)
- Elevation: 187 m (614 ft)

Population (2025-12-31)
  - Total: 3,190
  - Density: 73.9/km^{2} (191/sq mi)
- Time zone: UTC+01:00 (CET)
  - Summer (DST): UTC+02:00 (CEST)
- Postal codes: 97956
- Dialling codes: 09341, 09348, 09349
- Vehicle registration: TBB, MGH
- Website: www.werbach.de

Werbach (German pronunciation: [ˈvɛʁbax]) is a municipality in the district of Main-Tauber in Baden-Württemberg in Germany.

== Geographical location ==
Werbach is located in the Taubertal between Tauberbischofsheim, Wertheim (Main) and Würzburg.

== History ==
Werbach is first mentioned in the year 1248. In 1563 the plague killed almost 500 people in Werbach. During the Campaign of the Main near Werbach one of the last combats of the Austro-Prussian War took place. On 24 July 1866 troops of Baden fought against troops of Oldenburg. The troops of Oldenburg, allies of the Prussians, occupied Werbach.

According to a municipal reform in Baden-Württemberg the municipalities of Werbach, Wenkheim, Werbachhausen and Brunntal were combined to the new municipality of Werbach on 31 December 1973. Gamburg and Niklashausen followed on 1 January 1975.
