= Eystein Weltzien =

Norwegian orienteer (born 1949)

Personal information
- Born: 14 December 1949 (age 76)
- Education: Norwegian School of Sport Sciences
- Children: Audun Weltzien; Ingunn Hultgreen Weltzien
- Awards: Egebergs Ærespris (1975)

Sport
- Sport: Orienteering; Cross-country skiing
Medal record
Men's orienteering
Representing Norway
World Championships
Gold medal – first place	1978 Kongsberg	Relay
Bronze medal – third place	1974 Silkeborg	Individual
Bronze medal – third place	1974 Silkeborg	Relay

Eystein Weltzien (born 14 December 1949) is a Norwegian orienteering competitor.

He is Relay World Champion from 1978 as a member of the Norwegian winning team, as well as having bronze medal from 1974. He also obtained bronze in the 1974 Individual World Championships. He won the long distance Norwegian Championships in 1972, 1974 and 1975. He also had a position as trainer for the Norwegian national orienteering team in the 1980s. Weltzien was awarded Egebergs Ærespris in 1975, for excel in both orienteering and cross-country skiing.

As a skier he represented IL i BUL.

His children Audun and Ingunn Hultgreen Weltzien compete in orienteering on an international level.

He has his education from the Norwegian School of Sport Sciences.

Awards
Preceded by Ivar Formo	Egebergs Ærespris; 1975	Succeeded by Bjørg Eva Jensen
