= Arne Johansson (orienteer) =

Swedish orienteering competitor (born 1950)

Medal record

Men's orienteering

Representing Sweden

World Championships
Gold medal – first place	1972 Dosky	Relay
Gold medal – first place	1974 Silkeborg	Relay
Gold medal – first place	1976 Aviemore	Relay

Arne Johansson (born 1950) is a Swedish orienteering competitor. He is three times Relay World Champion as a member of the Swedish winning teams in 1972, 1974 and 1976.
