= Svein Jacobsen =

Norwegian orienteer

Medal record

Men's orienteering

Representing Norway

World Championships
| Gold medal – first place | 1978 Kongsberg | Relay |
| Silver medal – second place | 1976 Aviemore | Relay |
| Bronze medal – third place | 1974 Silkeborg | Relay |
| Bronze medal – third place | 1976 Aviemore | Individual |

Svein Jacobsen is a Norwegian orienteering competitor. He is Relay World Champion from 1978, as a member of the Norwegian winning team. He also has a silver medal from 1976, and a bronze medal from 1974. He obtained bronze in the 1976 Individual World Championship.
