= Egil Johansen (orienteer) =

Norwegian orienteer (born 1954)

Personal information
- Born: 18 August 1954 (age 71)

Sport
- Sport: Orienteering
- Club: OK Sør; Randesund IL
Medal record
Men's orienteering
Representing Norway
World Championships
Gold medal – first place	1976 Aviemore	Individual
Gold medal – first place	1978 Kongsberg	Individual
Gold medal – first place	1978 Kongsberg	Relay
Silver medal – second place	1976 Aviemore	Relay
Silver medal – second place	1979 Tampere	Individual

Egil Johansen (born 18 August 1954) is a Norwegian orienteering competitor and coach. He was two times individual world champion in orienteering, and later coached the Norwegian national team.

== Biography ==
Born on 18 August 1954, Johansen represented the clubs OK Sør and Randesund IL.

He was winner of the 1976 and 1978 Individual World Orienteering Championships, as well as getting silver medal in 1979. He was Relay World Champion in 1978 as a member of the Norwegian winning team, and also have a silver medal from 1976. He won the Jukola relay in 1988.

He won seven individual national titles in orienteering, and two titles in relay (1975–1980). He served as coach for the Norwegian national team from 1992 to 1997, and from 2000 to 2002.

He has his education from the Norwegian School of Sport Sciences.
