= Rolf Pettersson (orienteer) =

Swedish orienteer

Medal record

Men's orienteering

Representing Sweden

World Championships
Gold medal – first place	1972 Dosky	Relay
Gold medal – first place	1974 Silkeborg	Relay
Gold medal – first place	1976 Aviemore	Relay
Gold medal – first place	1979 Tampere	Relay
Silver medal – second place	1976 Aviemore	Individual
Silver medal – second place	1978 Kongsberg	Relay

Rolf Pettersson (born 11 December 1944) is a Swedish orienteering competitor. He is a four-time Relay World Champion as a member of the winning Swedish team in 1972, 1974, 1976 and 1979, and was runner-up in 1978. He won silver in the Individual World Championship in 1976.
