= Ludwig von Weltzien =

Prussian Army officer (1815–1870)

- Peter Friedrich Ludwig von Weltzien
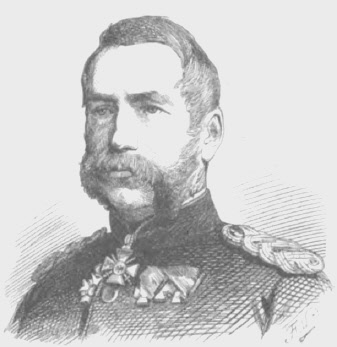
- Born: 1 April 1815; Bockhorn, Grand Duchy of Oldenburg
- Died: 16 October 1870 (aged 55); Wiesbaden, Duchy of Nassau, North German Confederation
- Military career
- Allegiance: Oldenburg; North German Confederation
- Branch: (Grand Duchy of Oldenburg) Oldenburg Contingent; Prussian Army
- Service years: 1829–1870
- Rank: Lieutenant General
- Commands: Oldenburg-Hanseatic Brigade; 15th Division
- Conflicts: First Schleswig War; Austro-Prussian War: Battle of Werbach; Franco-Prussian War: Battle of Gravelotte; Siege of Metz
- Awards: Wilhelmsorden; House and Merit Order of Peter Frederick Louis; Order of the Red Eagle; Iron Cross

Peter Friedrich Ludwig von Weltzien was an Oldenburg-Prussian lieutenant general who served in the Austro-Prussian and Franco-Prussian wars.

== Biography ==
He came from the noble family von Weltzien and was the son of the Oldenburg Major Maximilian von Weltzien (born 2 August 1776; died 21 April 1852) and his wife Johanna née von Reiche (born 31 March 1789; died 16 March 1847), who was a sister of General Ludwig von Reiche.

Weltzien attended the Mariengymnasium in Jever and joined the infantry regiment of the Grand Duchy of Oldenburg as a volunteer on 21 June 1829. He was promoted to second lieutenant on 30 December 1832, and attended the General War School in Berlin from 1834 to 1837. There he was a member of several state student associations, since 1836 of the Corps Vandalia Rostock and since 1837 of the Corps Hanseatia Rostock. In 1840 he was transferred to the staff of the Oldenburg-Hanseatic Brigade and in 1841 was promoted to premier lieutenant.

In 1839 he joined the recently founded Literary and Sociable Association and took an active part in the then flourishing movement of moderation. In 1844 Weltzien also became a junior chamberlain and accompanied Grand Duke Augustus to the University of Leipzig from 1846 to 1848. In 1848 he served in the First Schleswig War as brigade adjutant and in 1849 as a captain in the staff of the Reserve Division. Weltzien fought in the prelude to the Battle of Dybbøl and was later awarded the Knight's Cross of the Wilhelmsorden.

In 1853 he was assigned as brigade major and entrusted with the management of the Oldenburg's military school. In 1855 Weltzien was made a company commander and chamberlain. After his substantial promotion to major he was assigned as Oldenburg's military representative on the Military Commission of the German Confederation in Frankfurt am Main on 1 February 1859. In this capacity, serving a two-years tour, he was promoted to lieutenant colonel in mid-March 1860, and served as battalion commander after his return to line duty. On 1 January 1862 he was promoted to colonel and regimental commander. A Major general since 30 April 1865, Weltzien was the successor of Wilhelm von Ranzow as commander of both the Oldenburg Contingent and the Oldenburg-Hanseatic Brigade. In the next year he led his brigade in the Austro-Prussian War as part of the Army of the Main for the campaign against Austria's southern German allies. There he fought against the Baden Division in the Battle of Werbach. For his achievements Weltzien received the Commander's Cross of the House and Merit Order of Peter Frederick Louis with Swords, and from the Prussian King Wilhelm I he received the Order of the Red Eagle 2nd Class with oak leaves and swords.

When the German military was reorganized and the federal Oldenburg Contingent subsequently absorbed by the Prussian Army, Weltzien was attached to the staff of the 15th Division in Cologne on 25 September 1867. He was promoted to Lieutenant General on 22 March 1868, and assigned as acting commander of the division on 8 April 1869. With the beginning of the Franco-Prussian War he was appointed as permanent commander of his unit and on August 18 fought in the Battle of Gravelotte. During the Siege of Metz, Weltzien received the Iron Cross, 2nd Class but fell ill with typhus. The mourning for the death of his only son Peter, who died as a war volunteer at Gravelotte, worsened the illness from which the elder Weltzien died on 16 October 1870 in Wiesbaden.

== Family ==
From 4 August 1847 Weltzien was married to Marianne née Brockhaus (1829-1919), daughter of the bookseller and publisher Friedrich Brockhaus. The couple had the following children:

- Peter (1852-1870)
- Helene (1849–1897) ⚭ 1872 Arnold Woldemar von Frege-Weltzien (1841–1916)
- Elisabeth (1850–1881) ⚭ 1872 Rudolf Marschall von Bieberstein (1840–1915)

== Bibliography ==
- Kurt von Priesdorff: Soldatisches Führertum. Band 7, Hanseatische Verlagsanstalt Hamburg, o. O. [Hamburg], o. J. [1939], DNB-IDN 367632829, S. 502–503, Nr. 2439.
- Ernst Wilhelm Theodor Zedelius: Personal-Chronik der oldenburgischen Officiere und Mailitairbeamten von 1775 bis 1867. Oldenburg 1876. Digitalisat
- Ernst Theodor von Finckh: Geschichte des Oldenburgischen Infanterie-Regiments Nr. 91. Berlin 1881.
- Bernhard von Poten (1896). "Weltzien, Ludwig von" . Allgemeine Deutsche Biographie (in German). Vol. 41. Leipzig: Duncker & Humblot. pp. 698–699.
- Hans Friedl: Weltzien, Peter Friedrich Ludwig. In: Hans Friedl u. a. (Hrsg.): Biographisches Handbuch zur Geschichte des Landes Oldenburg. Hrsg. im Auftrag der Oldenburgischen Landschaft. Isensee, Oldenburg 1992, ISBN 3-89442-135-5, S. 786–787 (online).
- Wolf Lüdeke von Weltzien: Stammstafeln der uradligen mecklenburgischen Familie von Weltzien. Stuttgart 1960 (Manuskript, Niedersächsisches Staatsarchiv Oldenburg).
- Gothaisches genealogisches Taschenbuch der adeligen Häuser. 1901. Zweiter Jahrgang, S. 915.
