= Kristin Cullmann =

Swedish orienteering competitor

Medal record

Women's orienteering

Representing Sweden

World Championships
Gold medal – first place	1974 Silkeborg	Relay
Gold medal – first place	1976 Aviemore	Relay
Silver medal – second place	1974 Silkeborg	Individual
Silver medal – second place	1976 Aviemore	Individual
Silver medal – second place	1978 Kongsberg	Relay

Kristin Cullmann (born 23 June 1955) is a Swedish orienteering competitor. She is two times Relay World Champion as a member of the Swedish winning team in 1974 and 1976, as well as having a silver medal from 1978. She obtained silver in the Individual World Championships in 1974 and 1976.
