= 2018 in orienteering =

== 2018 Orienteering World Cup ==
- May 5 – 13: World Cup round 1 in Switzerland
  - Sprint winners: (Switzerland) Daniel Hubmann (m) / (Sweden) Tove Alexandersson (f)
  - Middle winners: (Switzerland) Matthias Kyburz (m) / (Finland) Marika Teini (f)
  - Long winners: (Norway) Olav Lundanes (m) / (Sweden) Tove Alexandersson (f)
- August 4 – 11: World Cup round 2 in Latvia
  - Sprint winners: (Switzerland) Daniel Hubmann (m) / (Denmark) Maja Alm (f)
  - Middle winners: (Norway) Eskil Kinneberg (m) / (Russia) Natalia Gemperle (f)
  - Long winners: (Norway) Olav Lundanes (m) / (Sweden) Tove Alexandersson (f)
- August 31 – September 2: World Cup round 3 in Norway
  - Long winners: (Sweden) Gustav Bergman (m) / (Sweden) Tove Alexandersson (f)
  - Middle winners: (Sweden) William Lind (m) / (Sweden) Tove Alexandersson (f)
- October 4 – 7: World Cup round 4 in Czech Republic
  - Knockout Sprint winners: (Czech Republic) Vojtěch Král (m) / (Switzerland) Judith Wyder (f)
  - Middle winners: (Czech Republic) Milos Nykodym (m) / (Sweden) Karolin Ohlsson (f)
  - Long winners: (Sweden) Jonas Leandersson (m) / (Sweden) Tove Alexandersson (f)

== 2018 MTB Orienteering World Cup ==
- June 27 – July 1: World Cup round 1 in Hungary
- August 4 – 12: World Cup round 2 in Austria
- September 20 – 23: World Cup round 3 in Portugal

== 2017–18 World Cup in Ski Orienteering ==
- November 28 – December 4, 2017: Ski Orienteering World Cup round 1 in Finland
  - Sprint winners: (Russia) Andrey Lamov (m) / (Finland) Salla Koskela (f)
  - Middle winners: (Russia) Andrey Lamov (m) / (Sweden) Tove Alexandersson (f)
  - Long winners: (Russia) Andrey Lamov (m) / (Sweden) Tove Alexandersson (f)
- February 3 – 8: Ski Orienteering World Cup round 2 in Bulgaria
  - Sprint winners: (Russia) Eduard Khrennikov (m) / (Sweden) Tove Alexandersson (f)
  - Middle winners: (Russia) Andrey Lamov (m) / (Sweden) Tove Alexandersson (f)
  - Long winners: (Sweden) Erik Rost (m) / (Russia) Maria Kechkina (f)
- March 4 – 12: Ski Orienteering World Cup round 3 in United States
  - Sprint winners: (Russia) Andrey Lamov (m) / (Sweden) Tove Alexandersson (f)
  - Middle winners: (Sweden) Erik Rost / (Sweden) Tove Alexandersson (f)
  - Long winners: (Sweden) Erik Rost (m) / (Finland) Salla Koskela (f)
  - Mixed sprint relay winners: Sweden (Erik Rost & Tove Alexandersson)

== Continental & International Orienteering events ==
- February 3 – 8: European Ski Orienteering Championships in Bulgaria
  - Long winners: (Sweden) Erik Rost (m) / (Russia) Maria Kechkina (f)
  - Middle winners: (Russia) Andrey Lamov (m) / (Sweden) Tove Alexandersson (f)
  - Sprint winners: (Russia) Eduard Khrennikov (m) / (Sweden) Tove Alexandersson (f)
  - Mixed sprint relay winners: Sweden 1 (Tove Alexandersson & Erik Rost)
  - Relay winners: Norway 1 (Jørgen Madslien, Øyvind Watterdal, Lars Moholdt)
- February 4 – 8: European Youth Ski Orienteering Championships in Bulgaria
  - Sprint U17 winners: (Russia) Artemiy Dorma (m) / (Russia) Zoya Chernykh (f)
  - Middle U17 winners: (Finland) Akseli Virtanen (m) / (Switzerland) Alina Niggli (f)
  - Long U17 winners: (Finland) Matias Maijala (m) / (Russia) Olesia Riazanova (f)
  - Relay winners: Finland (Samuli Peltola, Akseli Virtanen, Matias Maijala)
- February 4 – 8: Junior World Ski Orienteering Championships in Bulgaria
  - Sprint U20 winners: (Russia) Igor Linkevich (m) / (Finland) Liisa Nenonen (f)
  - Middle U20 winners: (Norway) Jørgen Baklid (m) / (Russia) Marina Vyatkina (f)
  - Long U20 winners: (Norway) Jørgen Baklid (m) / (Russia) Ekaterina Stepanova (f)
  - Relay winners: Russia 1 (Sergey Mizonov, Nicolai Vlasov, Igor Linkevich)
- February 21 – 25: 2018 World University Ski Orienteering Championship in (Estonia) Tartu
  - Sprint winners: (Russia) Sergey Gorlanov (m) / (Norway) Anna Ulvensøen (f)
  - Pursuit winners: (Norway) Jørgen Haugen Madslien (m) / (Norway) Anna Ulvensøen (f)
  - Middle distance winners: (Russia) Sergey Gorlanov (m) / (Norway) Anna Ulvensøen (f)
  - Sprint Relay winners: Norway 1 (Anna Ulvensøen & Jørgen Haugen Madslien)
- March 6 – 10: World Masters Ski Orienteering Championships 2018 in United States
  - For Middle 1 Results here.
  - For Middle 2 Results here.
  - For Long Results here.
- April 28 – May 1: European Trail Orienteering Championships 2018 in Slovakia
  - PreO winner: (Finland) Antti Rusanen
  - PreO Para winner: (Russia) Pavel Shmatov
  - TempO winner: (Finland) Pinja Mäkinen
  - Relay winners: Finland 1 (Pinja Mäkinen, Juha Hiirsalmi, Antti Rusanen)
  - Relay Para winners: Czech Republic 1 (Hanka Doležalová, Pavel Dudík, Jana Kostová)
- May 6 – 13: 2018 European Orienteering Championships in Cadempino
  - Sprint winners: (Switzerland) Daniel Hubmann (m) / (Sweden) Tove Alexandersson (f)
  - Middle winners: (Switzerland) Matthias Kyburz (m) / (Finland) Marika Teini (f)
  - Long winners: (Norway) Olav Lundanes (m) / (Sweden) Tove Alexandersson (f)
  - Sprint Relay winners: Switzerland (Judith Wyder, Florian Howald, Daniel Hubmann, Elena Roos)
  - Relay winners: Norway 1 (Eskil Kinneberg, Magne Dæhli, Olav Lundanes)
- May 26: Baltic Orienteering Championships in Latvia
  - Winners: (Latvia) Artūrs Pauliņš (m) / (Latvia) Sandra Grosberga (f)
- June 8 & 9: MTB Baltic Orienteering Championships 2018 in Latvia
  - Sprint Elite winners: (Russia) Grigory Medvedev (m) / (Russia) Svetlana Poverina (f)
  - Middle Elite winners: (Lithuania) Jonas Maišelis (m) / (Russia) Olga Shipilova-Vinogradova (f)
- June 28 – July 1: European Youth Orienteering Championships 2018 in Bulgaria
- July 6 – 13: World Masters Orienteering Championships 2018 in Denmark
- July 8 – 15: Junior World Orienteering Championships in Hungary
- July 17 – 21: 2018 World University Orienteering Championship in (Finland) Kuortane
- June 27 – July 1: European Junior MTB Orienteering Championships in Hungary
  - Sprint winners: (Denmark) Thomas Steinthal (m) / (Russia) Marina Oparina (f)
  - Long winners: (Denmark) Thomas Steinthal (m) / (France) Lou Garcin (f)
  - Middle winners: (Denmark) Thomas Steinthal (m) / (Russia) Uliana Sukholovskaya (f)
  - Relay winners: Finland (Tomi Nykanen, Juha Lilja, Teemu Kaksonen) (m) / Czech Republic (Veronika Grycova, Rozalie Kucharova, Vilma Kralova)
- June 27 – July 1: European MTB Orienteering Championships in Hungary
  - Long winners: (Czech Republic) Vojtech Ludvik (m) / (Czech Republic) Martina Tichovska (f)
  - Middle winners: (Czech Republic) Kryštof Bogar (m) / (Russia) Olga Shipilova Vinogradova (f)
  - Mixed Relay winners: Czech Republic 1 (Martina Tichovska, Vojtech Ludvik, Kryštof Bogar)
- June 27 – July 1: World Masters MTB Orienteering Championships 2018 in Hungary
  - For Mass Start Results here.
  - For Sprint Results here.
  - For Long Results here.
  - For Middle Results here.
- August 4 – 11: 2018 World Orienteering Championships in Latvia
  - Long winners: (Norway) Olav Lundanes (m) / (Sweden) Tove Alexandersson (f)
  - Middle winners: (Norway) Eskil Kinneberg (m) / (Russia) Natalia Gemperle (f)
  - Sprint winners: (Switzerland) Daniel Hubmann (m) / (Denmark) Maja Alm (f)
  - Relay winners: Norway (Gaute Hallan Steiwer, Eskil Kinneberg, Magne Dæhli) (m) / Switzerland (Elena Roos, Julia Jakob, Judith Wyder)
  - Sprint Relay winners: Sweden (Tove Alexandersson, Emil Svensk, Jonas Leandersson, Karolin Ohlsson)
- August 4 – 11: World Trail Orienteering Championships 2018 in Latvia
  - TempO winner: (Finland) Petteri Hakala
  - PreO winner: (Slovakia) Jan Furucz
  - Relay winners: Norway (Lars Jakob Waaler, Geir Myhr Oien, Sondre Ruud Braten)
- August 5 – 12: European Youth MTB Orienteering Championships in Austria
  - Middle winners: (France) Kylian Wymer (m) / (Finland) Kaarina Nurminen (f)
  - Long winners: (Czech Republic) Richard Wohanka (m) / (Finland) Kaarina Nurminen (f)
  - Sprint winners: (France) Kylian Wymer (m) / (Russia) Alena Aksenova (f)
  - Relay winners: France 1 (Kylian Wymer, Albin Demaret-Joly, Jason Bedry) (m) / Russia 1 (Cristina Vaganova, Anastasiia Ruzanova, Alena Aksenova) (f)
- August 5 – 12: World MTB Orienteering Championships in Austria
  - Long winners: (Czech Republic) Kryštof Bogar (m) / (Czech Republic) Martina Tichovská (f)
  - Sprint winners: (Russia) Anton Foliforov (m) / (Finland) Henna Saarinen (f)
  - Mass Start winners: (Finland) Jussi Laurila (m) / (Denmark) Camilla Søgaard (f)
  - Middle winners: (Switzerland) Simon Braendli (m) / (Russia) Olga Shipilova Vinogradova (f)
  - Relay winners: Russia 1 Anton Foliforov, Ruslan Gritsan, Grigory Medvedev) (m) / Czech Republic 1 (Katerina Novakova, Veronika Kubinova, Martina Tichovská) (f)
- August 5 – 12: Junior World MTB Orienteering Championship in Austria
  - Long winners: (Czech Republic) Jan Hasek (m) / (France) Constance Devillers (f)
  - Sprint winners: (Denmark) Thomas Steinthal (m) / (Czech Republic) Vilma Králová (f)
  - Mass Start winners: (Czech Republic) Jan Hasek (m) / (Russia) Uliana Sukholovskaya (f)
  - Middle winners: (Switzerland) Adrian Jaeggi (m) / (Czech Republic) Vilma Králová (f)
  - Relay winners: Czech Republic 1 (Richard Wohanka, Matyáš Ludvík, Jan Hasek) (m) / Czech Republic 1 (Veronika Grycová, Alexandra Svobodová, Vilma Králová)
- August 18 – 21: North American Orienteering Championships in Canada
  - Long winners: (Estonia) Timo Sild (m) / (United States) Alison Crocker (f)
  - Middle winners: (Estonia) Timo Sild (m) / (United States) Alison Crocker (f)
  - Sprint winners: (Estonia) Timo Sild (m) / (United States) Tori Borish (f)
- August 23 – 25: South East European Championships in Slovenia
  - Long winners: (New Zealand) Tim Robertson (m) / (Bulgaria) Kristina Ivanova (f)
  - Middle winners: (Austria) Jannis Bonek (m) / (Moldova) Galina Rîbediuc (f)
  - Sprint winners: (New Zealand) Tim Robertson (m) / (New Zealand) Laura Robertson (f)
- October 13: Kinmen Orienteering Championships & WRE 2018 in Chinese Taipei
  - Elite winners: (Hong Kong) Tsz Wai Yu (m) / (Hong Kong) Cho Yu Lam (f)
- November 5 – 11: South American Orienteering Championships & South American Youth Orienteering Championships in Uruguay
- December 23 – 26: Asian Orienteering Championships in Hong Kong
