= Olga Shevchenko =

Russian ski-orienteer

Medal record

Representing Russia

Women's ski orienteering

World Championships
Gold medal – first place	2007 Moscow	Relay
Bronze medal – third place	2005 Levi	Long

World Cup
Bronze medal – third place	2007/8	Overall WC

Olga Shevchenko is a Russian ski-orienteering competitor and world champion. She won a gold medal in the relay event at the World Ski Orienteering Championships in Moscow in 2007, together with Natalia Tomilova and Tatiana Vlasova. She received a bronze medal in the long distance in Levi in 2005.

She finished third in the overall World Cup in Ski Orienteering in 2007/2008, behind Tatiana Vlasova Liisa Anttila.
