= Stina Grenholm =

Swedish orienteer

Medal record

Representing Sweden

Women's Ski-orienteering

World Championships
| Gold medal – first place | 2002 Borovetz | Middle |
| Bronze medal – third place | 2004 Östersund | Middle |
| Bronze medal – third place | 2005 Levi | Middle |

World Cup
| Bronze medal – third place | 2003 | Overall WC |

Stina Grenholm (born 1977) is a Swedish ski-orienteering competitor and world champion.

She won a gold medal in the middle distance at the 2002 World Ski Orienteering Championships in Borovetz, a bronze medal in 2004, and a second bronze medal in 2005 (shared with Stine Hjermstad Kirkevik).

She finished third overall in the World Cup in Ski Orienteering in 2003, behind Natalia Tomilova and Tatiana Vlasova.
