= Audun Knutsen =

Norwegian orienteer

Medal record

Representing Norway

Men's ski orienteering

World Championships
Gold medal – first place	1986 Batak	Relay

Audun Knutsen is a Norwegian ski-orienteering competitor and world champion. He won a gold medal in the relay at the World Ski Orienteering Championships in Batak in 1986, together with Sigurd Dæhli, Lars Lystad and Vidar Benjaminsen. His father Tormod was a medallist in Nordic combined skiing at the 1960 and 1964 Winter Olympics.
