= Reenaas =

Reenaas is a Norwegian surname. Notable people with the surname include:

- Kjersti Reenaas (born 1981), Norwegian ski-orienteering competitor
- Marte Reenaas (born 1979), Norwegian ski-orienteering competitor
