= 2022 World Ski Orienteering Championships =

International ski orienteering competition

2022 World Championships
- Location: Kemi-Keminmaa, Finland
- Dates: 15–19 March

The 2022 World Ski Orienteering Championships was held from 15 to 19 March 2022 in Kemi-Keminmaa, Finland.

== Medal summary ==
=== Medal table ===
* Host nation (Finland)

Rank	Nation	Gold	Silver	Bronze	Total
1	Norway	2	0	1	3
2	Estonia	2	0	0	2
3	Sweden	1	4	3	8
4	Finland*	1	4	1	6
5	Bulgaria	1	0	0	1
6	Switzerland	0	0	1	1
Totals (6 entries)		7	8	6	21

=== Men ===
Event	Gold		Silver		Bronze	
Sprint	Ville-Petteri Saarela; Finland	11:47	Tuomas Kotro; Finland	11:48	Rasmus Wickbom; Sweden	11:50
Pursuit	Jørgen Baklid; Norway	1:09:02	Tuomas Kotro; Finland	1:09:36	Nicola Müller; Switzerland	1:10:03
Middle	Stanimir Belomazhev; Bulgaria	40:45	Rasmus Wickbom; Sweden	40:47	Tuomas Kotro; Finland	41:26

=== Women ===
Event	Gold		Silver		Bronze	
Sprint	Daisy Kudre-Schnyder; Estonia	11:36	Salla Koskela; Finland Anna Magdalena Olsson; Sweden	11:37	Not awarded	
Pursuit	Linda Lindkvist; Sweden	1:10:45	Salla Koskela; Finland	1:10:54	Anna Ulvensøen; Norway	1:10:56
Middle	Daisy Kudre-Schnyder; Estonia	36:43	Linda Lindkvist; Sweden	37:54	Evelina Wickbom; Sweden	38:11

=== Mixed ===
Event	Gold		Silver		Bronze	
Sprint relay	Norway 1 Anna Ulvensøen; Jørgen Baklid	39:49	Sweden 2 Anna Magdalena Olsson; Linus Rapp	40:08	Sweden 1 Linda Lindkvist; Rasmus Wickbom	40:32

== Participants ==
A total of 106 competitors and 34 officials from the national teams of the following 16 countries was registered to compete at 2022 World Ski Orienteering Championships.

- Austria (2)
- Bulgaria (2)
- Czech Republic (8)
- Estonia (8)
- Finland (16)
- Germany (1)
- Italy (4)
- Japan (4)
- Kazakhstan (7)
- Latvia (4)
- Lithuania (4)
- Norway (16)
- Romania (1)
- Sweden (15)
- Switzerland (12)
- United States (2)
