= Vasily Glukharev =

Russian ski orienteer

Medal record

Representing Russia

Men's ski orienteering

World Ski Orienteering Championships
Gold medal – first place	2004 Åsarna-Östersund	Relay

Vasily Glukharev (born 15 April 1980) is a Russian ski orienteer. He competed at the 2004 World Ski Orienteering Championships, where he placed 10th in the middle distance, and participated on the Russian relay team. The Russian team consisted of Glukharev, Andrei Gruzdev, Ruslan Gritsan and Eduard Khrennikov, winning gold medals ahead of the Norwegian team.
