= Staffan Tunis =

Finnish ski-orienteer

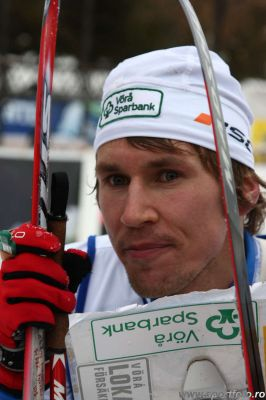

Medal record

Representing Finland

Men's ski orienteering

World Championships
Gold medal – first place	2009 Rusutsu	Relay
Silver medal – second place	2009 Rusutsu	Middle
Bronze medal – third place	2009 Rusutsu	Sprint
Silver medal – second place	2007 Moscow region	Middle
Bronze medal – third place	2007 Moscow region	Sprint

Junior World Championships
Silver medal – second place	2002	Short
Bronze medal – third place	2002	Long

Staffan Tunis (born 5 December 1982) in Vörå is a Finnish ski-orienteering competitor. He received a silver medal in the middle distance and a bronze medal in the sprint at the 2007 World Ski Orienteering Championships. He finished 5th with the Finnish relay team (Jukka Lanki, Matti Keskinarkaus and Tunis) at the 2007 world championships.

Tunis finished third in the overall World Cup in Ski Orienteering in 2006.

== See also ==
- Finnish orienteers
- List of orienteers
- List of orienteering events
