= Marie Ohlsson =

Swedish ski orienteer

Medal record

Representing Sweden

Women's Ski-orienteering

World Championships
Gold medal – first place	2009 Rusutsu	Relay

Marie Ohlsson is a Swedish ski-orienteering competitor and World Champion. She won a gold medal in the relay at the 2009 World Ski Orienteering Championships, with the team members Helene Söderlund and Josefine Engström.
