= Pesu =

Pesu may refer to:

== People ==
- Mervi Pesu (born 1973), Finnish orienteering competitor
- Pesu Mal, Pakistani politician
- Raino Pesu (born 1972), Finnish orienteering competitor

== Other uses ==
- Pesu (film), an unreleased Indian Tamil-language romance film
- PES University (People's Education Society University), a private university in Bengaluru, India
