= Harald Svergja =

Norwegian orienteer (born 1964)

Medal record

Representing Norway

Men's ski orienteering

World Championships
Gold medal – first place	1994 Val di Non	Relay
Bronze medal – third place	1990 Skellefteå	Relay
Bronze medal – third place	1992 Pontarlier	Relay
Bronze medal – third place	1996 Lillehammer	Relay

World Cup
Bronze medal – third place	1993	Overall WC

Harald Svergja (born 1964) is a Norwegian ski-orienteering competitor and world champion. He won a gold medal in the relay event at the World Ski Orienteering Championships in Val di Non in 1994, together with Kjetil Ulven, Lars Lystad and Vidar Benjaminsen.

He finished third in the overall World Cup in Ski Orienteering in 1993.
