= Väisänen =

Väisänen is a Finnish surname.

== Geographical distribution ==
As of 2014, 94.9% of all known bearers of the surname Väisänen were residents of Finland and 3.8% of Sweden.

In Finland, the frequency of the surname was higher than national average (1:557) in the following regions:

1. Kainuu (1:85)
2. Southern Savonia (1:153)
3. Northern Savonia (1:212)
4. North Ostrobothnia (1:332)

== People ==
- A. O. Väisänen (1890–1969), Finnish scholar of folk music, an ethnographer and ethno-musicologist
- Ilpo Väisänen (born 1963), Finnish electronic musician
- Kalle Väisänen (born 2003), Finnish ice hockey player
- Matti Väisänen (ski-orienteer) (born 1948), Finnish ski-orienteering competitor
- Matti Väisänen (bishop) (born 1934), Finnish former priest and bishop
- Mervi Väisänen (born 1973), Finnish ski-orienteering and mountain bike orienteering competitor
- Sauli Väisänen (born 1994), Finnish footballer
- Ville Väisänen (born 1977), Finnish footballer
