= Agneta Månsson =

Swedish ski orienteering competitor

Medal record

Representing Sweden

Women's ski-orienteering

World Championships
Silver medal – second place	1975 Hyvinkää	Individual
Silver medal – second place	1975 Hyvinkää	Relay

Agneta Månsson is a Swedish ski orienteering competitor. At the World Ski Orienteering Championships in 1975 she won a silver medal in the individual contest, behind winner Sinikka Kukkonen, and a silver medal in the relay with the Swedish team (with team mates Lena Samuelsson and Marianne Bogestedt).
