= Mira Kaskinen =

Finnish ski orienteering competitor

Personal information
- Born: 4 July 1991 (age 35)

Sport
- Sport: Ski orienteering
- Club: Rastikarhut; Ulvilan Ura
Medal record
Representing Finland
Women's ski orienteering
World Championships
Silver medal – second place	2015 Hamar / Løten	Long

Mira Kaskinen (born 4 July 1991) is a Finnish ski orienteering competitor.

She won a silver medal in the long distance at the 2015 World Ski Orienteering Championships, behind Josefine Engström. She placed fourth in the middle distance at the 2015 Championships, in a close race, only three seconds behind gold medalist Milka Reponen.
