= Anne Benjaminsen =

Finnish ski-orienteering competitor

Medal record

Representing Finland

Women's Ski-orienteering

World Championships
Gold medal – first place	1988 Kuopio	Relay

Anne Benjaminsen (née Veijalainen; born 25 March 1964) is a Finnish ski-orienteering competitor and World Champion.

She participated at the 1988 World Ski Orienteering Championships in Kuopio, and won a gold medal in the relay with the Finnish team, with the teammates Sirpa Kukkonen and Virpi Juutilainen. She placed fifth in the classic distance, and eight in the short distance.

== Personal life ==
Benjaminsen is married to Norwegian orienteer Vidar Benjaminsen. Norwegian figure skater Juni Marie Benjaminsen and Norwegian orienteer Andrine Benjaminsen are their children.

== See also ==
- Finnish orienteers
- List of orienteers
- List of orienteering events
