= Björn Lans =

Swedish ski orienteer

Medal record

Representing Sweden

Men's ski orienteering

World Championships
Gold medal – first place	1996 Lillehammer	Short
Gold medal – first place	1996 Lillehammer	Relay

World Cup
Silver medal – second place	1999	Overall WC

Björn Lans is a Swedish ski-orienteering competitor and world champion.

== Ski orienteering ==
He competed at the 1996 World Ski Orienteering Championships in Lillehammer, where he received a gold medal in the short distance, and also a gold medal in the relay event, together with Per-Ove Bergqvist, Mikael Lindmark and Bertil Nordqvist.

At the World Cup in Ski Orienteering in 1999 Lans finished overall second, behind winner Raino Pesu.
