= Tomas Löfgren =

Swedish ski-orienteer

Medal record

Representing Sweden

Men's ski orienteering

World Championships
Gold medal – first place	2004 Östersund	Middle
Silver medal – second place	2004 Östersund	Long

World Cup
Silver medal – second place	2006	Overall WC

Tomas Löfgren (born 1977) is a world champion Swedish ski-orienteering competitor.

== Ski orienteering ==
He competed at the 2004 World Ski Orienteering Championships in Åsarna/Östersund, where he received a gold medal in the middle distance, and a silver medal in the long course behind Eduard Khrennikov. He finished 6th in the sprint, and 4th in the relay event with the Swedish team.

At the World Cup in Ski Orienteering in 2006 Löfgren finished overall second, behind winner Eduard Khrennikov.
