= Sinikka Kukkonen =

Finnish orienteering competitor

Personal information
- Nationality: Finnish
- Born: 1 August 1947 Tervo, Finland
- Died: 25 July 2016 (aged 68) Heinola, Finland

Sport
- Sport: Orienteering; Ski orienteering
Medal record
Representing Finland
Women's orienteering
World Championships
Gold medal – first place	1972 Jicin	Relay
Silver medal – second place	1976 Aviemore	Relay
Women's ski-orienteering
World Championships
Gold medal – first place	1975 Hyvinkää	Individual
Gold medal – first place	1975 Hyvinkää	Relay
Gold medal – first place	1977 Velingrad	Relay
Gold medal – first place	1980 Avesta	Relay
Silver medal – second place	1982 Aigen im Ennstal	Relay
Bronze medal – third place	1977 Velingrad	Individual

Sinikka Kukkonen (1 August 1947 – 25 July 2016) was a Finnish orienteering competitor. She is World Champion in both orienteering and ski orienteering. She became the first World Champion in ski orienteering, in 1975.

== Orienteering career ==
At the World Orienteering Championships in 1970 Kukkonen placed 32nd in the individual event, and participated on the Finnish relay team that placed fourth. She was a member of the Finnish winning team at the 1972 World Orienteering Championships, together with team mates Pirjo Seppä and Liisa Veijalainen, and placed 25th in the individual contest. At the 1974 World Championships she placed 22nd in the individual, and fifth in the relay. She won a silver medal at the 1976 relay event, together with Outi Borgenström and Liisa Veijalainen, and placed seventh in the individual contest. She also participated in the 1978 World Championships, where she placed 22nd in the individual contest.

== Ski orienteering career ==
Kukkonen participated at the first official World Ski Orienteering Championships, held in Hyvinkää, Finland, in 1975. At these championships she won a gold medal in the individual event, 46 seconds ahead of Agneta Månsson from Sweden. She also won a gold medal in the relay, together with team mates Raili Sallinen and Aila Flöjt. At the 1977 World Championships in Velingrad, Bulgaria, she won a gold medal in the relay, with Kaija Halonen and Aila Flöjt, and a bronze medal in the individual contest. In 1980 Kukkonen placed fourth in the individual contest, and won a gold medal with the Finnish relay team, together with Mirja Puhakka and Kaija Silvennoinen. At the 1982 World Championships she won a silver medal in the relay, together with team mates Sirpa Kukkonen and Mirja Puhakka, and she placed shared fourth in the individual contest.

== See also ==
- Finnish orienteers
- List of orienteers
- List of orienteering events
