= Kjersti Reenaas =

Norwegian orienteer (born 1981)

Medal record

Women's ski orienteering

World Championships
Gold medal – first place	2005 Levi	Relay

Kjersti Reenaas (born 24 February 1981) is a Norwegian ski-orienteering competitor, and world champion in the sport.

== Biography ==
Reenaas won a gold medal in the relay event at the World Ski Orienteering Championships in Levi in 2005, together with Marte Reenaas and Stine Hjermstad Kirkevik. She placed 11th in both the long distance and the middle distance at the 2005 world championships.
