= 2024 in orienteering =

This article lists the orienteering sports events for 2024.

== Foot orienteering ==
- Foot orienteering calendar 2024 here.

=== World Championships ===
- June 30 – July 7: 2024 Junior World Orienteering Championships in (Czech Republic) Plzeň
- July 12–16: 2024 World Orienteering Championships in (Scotland) Edinburgh

=== Continental Championships ===
- January 26 – February 6: Oceania Orienteering Championships 2024 in (New Zealand) Auckland
  - Sprint winners: (New Zealand) Joseph Lynch (m) / (Sweden) Emma Bjessmo (f)
  - Knock-out sprint winners: (New Zealand) Joseph Lynch (m) / (Sweden) Emma Bjessmo (f)
  - Sprint relay winners: Australia 220
- June 21–24: 2024 European Youth Orienteering Championships in (Poland) Szczecin
  - U18
    - Long winners: (Norway) Emil Husebye Aamodt (m) / (Sweden) Freja Hjerne (f)
    - Sprint winners: (Slovakia) Filip Jancik (m) / (Hungary) Janka Mikes (f)
    - Relay winners: (Czech Republic) Check Republic (m) Sweden (f)
  - U16
    - Long winners: (Czech Republic) Erik Heczko (m) / (Switzerland) Mira Werder(f)
    - Sprint winners: (France) Simon Calandry (m) / (Switzerland) Mira Werder(f)
    - Relay winners: Hungary (m) Finland (f)
- August 5–11: North American Orienteering Championships (Senior, Junior, Youth) 2024 in (Canada) Ottawa
- August 16–20: European Orienteering Championships 2024 (as part of World Cup round) in (Hungary) Mór
- October 11–14: South American Orienteering Championships in Colombia
- December 20–26: Asian Orienteering Championships 2024 in Thailand

=== 2024 Orienteering World Cup ===
- May 25–26: World Cup #1 in (Switzerland) Olten
- June 1–2: World Cup #2 in (Italy) Genoa
- August 16–20: World Cup #3 in (Hungary) Mór
- September 27–29: World Cup #4 in (Finland) Kuopio

== MTB orienteering ==
- MTB orienteering calendar 2024 here.

=== World Championships ===
- September 9–16: 2024 Junior World MTB Orienteering Championships in (Bulgaria) Shumen
- September 9–16: 2024 World MTB Orienteering Championships in (Bulgaria) Shumen

=== 2024 MTB Orienteering World Cup ===
- May 30 – June 1: World Cup #1 in (Poland) Ostróda
- July 5–6: World Cup #2 in (Latvia) Smiltene
- September 10–14: World Cup #3 in (Bulgaria) Shumen

== Ski orienteering ==
- Ski orienteering calendar 2024 here.

=== World Championships ===
- January 21–27: 2024 Junior World Ski Orienteering Championships in (Austria) Ramsau
  - Sprint winners: (Estonia) Olle Ilmar Jaama (m) / (Sweden) Elsa Brandt (f)
  - Middle winners: (Finland) Pyry Riissanen (m) / (Finland) Amanda Yli Futka (f)
  - Long winners: (Estonia) Olle Ilmar Jaama (m) / (Finland) Amanda Yli Futka (f)
  - Relay winners: Estonia (m) / Sweden (f)
- January 23–27: 2024 World Ski Orienteering Championships in (Austria) Ramsau
  - Sprint winners: (Norway) Jorgen Baklid (m) / (Sweden) Magdalena Olsson (f)
  - Pursuit winners: (Norway) Jorgen Baklid (m) / (Sweden) Magdalena Olsson (f)
  - Middle winners: (Norway) Jorgen Baklid (m) / (Norway) Anna Ulvensøen (f)
  - Mixed Sprint Relay winners: (Norway) Jorgen Baklid & Anna Ulvensøen
- February 23–25: 2024 Ski Orienteering World Cup Final and U23 Ski Orienteering Championships in (Estonia) Haanja
  - Sprint winners: (Finland) Niklas Ekström (m) / (Lithuania) Judita Traubaite (f)
  - Pursuit winners: (Finland) Niklas Ekström (m) / (Norway) Anna Ulvensøen (f)
  - Middle winners: (Finland) Eevert Toivonen (m) / (Estonia) Daisy Kudre Schnyder (f)
- February 23–25: 2024 World Master Ski Orienteering Championships in (Estonia) Haanja

== Trail orienteering ==
- Trail orienteering calendar 2024 here.

=== Continental Championships ===
- May 8–12: 2024 European Trail Orienteering Championships in (Finland) Turku
