= Gruzdev =

Gruzdev (Russian: Груздев) is a Russian male surname, its feminine counterpart is Gruzdeva. It may refer to

- Andrei Gruzdev (born 1977), Russian ski-orienteering competitor
- Artur Gruzdev (born 1998), Estonian ice dancer
- Dmitriy Gruzdev (born 1986), Kazakhstani road bicycle racer
- Vladimir Gruzdev (born 1967), Russian politician, businessman and explorer
