= 2010 Winter Military World Games =

I Winter Military World Games I Giochi mondiali militari invernali
- Opening: March 20
- Closing: March 25

Winter

Summer

The 1st Winter Military World Games were held in Aosta Valley, Italy from March 20–25, 2010.

== Medal table ==
* Host nation (Italy)

Rank	Nation	Gold	Silver	Bronze	Total
1	Italy (ITA)*	6	3	9	18
2	France (FRA)	6	2	4	12
3	China (CHN)	3	7	0	10
4	Russia (RUS)	3	2	1	6
5	Norway (NOR)	2	4	2	8
6	Slovenia (SLO)	2	2	0	4
7	Poland (POL)	2	0	1	3
8	Estonia (EST)	1	1	0	2
9	Germany (GER)	1	0	3	4
10	Bulgaria (BUL)	1	0	0	1
11	Austria (AUT)	0	3	2	5
12	Switzerland (SUI)	0	2	1	3
13	Romania (ROU)	0	1	1	2
14	Finland (FIN)	0	0	2	2
15	Lithuania (LTU)	0	0	1	1
15	Serbia (SRB)	0	0	1	1
Totals (16 entries)		27	27	28	82

== Medal winners ==
=== Alpine skiing ===
==== Men ====
Event	Gold	Silver	Bronze
Giant slalom	(France) Adrien Theaux	(Italy) Manfred Moelgg	(Italy) Massimiliano Blardone
Giant slalom team	Italy	Austria	Germany
Special slalom	(Italy) Giuliano Razzoli	(Austria) Matthias Tippelreither	(Germany) Stefan Kogler
Giant slalom team	Italy	Slovenia	Serbia

==== Women ====
Event	Gold	Silver	Bronze
Giant slalom	(Italy) Denise Karbon	(Italy) Irene Curtoni	(Germany) Fanny Chmelar
Giant slalom team	Italy	Austria	Romania
Special slalom	(Germany) Fanny Chmelar	(France) Marion Bertrand	(France) Tessa Worley
Giant slalom team	France	Romania	Italy

=== Biathlon ===
==== Men ====
Event	Gold	Silver	Bronze
10 km sprint	(Norway) Hans Martin Gjedrem	(Estonia) Roland Lessing	(Italy) Christian Martinelli
10 km sprint team	Italy	Norway	Finland
25 km patrol	Estonia	Switzerland	France

==== Women ====
Event	Gold	Silver	Bronze
7.5 km sprint	(Poland) Krystyna Pałka	(China) Wang Chunli	(Italy) Roberta Fiandino
7.5 km sprint team	Poland	China	Norway
15 km patrol	Norway	China	Poland

=== Cross-country skiing ===
==== Men ====
Event	Gold	Silver	Bronze
15 km free style	(France) Vincent Vittoz	(Switzerland) Toni Livers	(Italy) Giorgio Di Centa
15 km free style team	France	Italy	Switzerland

==== Women ====
Event	Gold	Silver	Bronze
10 km free style	(Russia) Natalia Korosteleva	(Norway) Kari Henneseid Eie	(Italy) Marianna Longa

=== Climbing ===
==== Men ====
Event	Gold	Silver	Bronze
Indoor	(Slovenia) Klemen Becan	(Austria) Kilian Fischhuber	(Italy) Flavio Crespi

==== Women ====
Event	Gold	Silver	Bronze
Indoor	(Slovenia) Maja Vidmar	(Slovenia) Martina Cufar	(Italy) Marion Poitevin

=== Short track speed skating ===
==== Men ====
Event	Gold	Silver	Bronze
500 m	(China) Nie Xin	(China) Cui Liang	(Italy) Roberto Serra
1500 m	(China) Song Weilong	(China) Nie Xin	(Germany) Torsten Kroger

==== Women ====
Event	Gold	Silver	Bronze
500 m	(China) Ma Shuai	(China) Sun Huizhu	(Austria) Veronika Windisch
1500 m	(Bulgaria) Evgenia Radanova	(China) Sun Huizhu	(Austria) Veronika Windisch

=== Ski orienteering ===
==== Men ====
Event	Gold	Silver	Bronze
Cross-country	(Russia) Eduard Khrennikov	(Norway) Eivind Tonna	(Russia) Vasily Glukharev
Team	Russia	Norway	Finland

==== Women ====
Event	Gold	Silver	Bronze
Cross-country	(France) Christelle Gros	(Russia) Natalia Naumova	(France) Elodie Bourgeois Pin
Team	France	Russia	Lithuania

== Participating nations ==
- Albania
- Austria
- Azerbaijan
- Belarus
- Belgium
- Bosnia and Herzegovina
- Brazil
- Bulgaria
- China
- Czech Republic
- Estonia
- Finland
- France
- Germany
- Hungary
- India
- Iran
- Italy
- Latvia
- Lebanon
- Lithuania
- Luxembourg
- Monaco
- Morocco
- Netherlands
- North Macedonia
- Norway
- Pakistan
- Peru
- Poland
- Romania
- Russia
- Serbia
- Slovenia
- South Korea
- Sweden
- Switzerland
- United States
- Ukraine

== See also ==
- Military World Games
