= Mervi Väisänen =

Finnish ski- and mountain bike orienteer

Mervi Pesu
Personal information
- Born: Mervi Väisänen; 2 May 1973 (age 53)
- Spouse: Raino Pesu

Sport
- Sport: Ski orienteering
Medal record
Representing Finland
Women's ski orienteering
World Championships
Gold medal – first place	2013 Ridder	Long
Bronze medal – third place	2002 Borovetz	Long
Bronze medal – third place	2015 Hamar / Løten	Middle
Women's mountain bike orienteering
World Championships
Silver medal – second place	2002 Fontainebleau	Sprint

Mervi Väisänen (born Mervi Pesu ; born 2 May 1973) is a Finnish ski-orienteering and mountain bike orienteering competitor.

She won a bronze medal in the long distance at the 2002 World Ski Orienteering Championships in Borovetz. She won a silver medal at the 2002 World MTB Orienteering Championships, after finishing seven seconds behind gold medalist Laure Coupat.

She won a bronze medal in the middle distance at the 2015 World Ski Orienteering Championships, behind Milka Reponen and Marjut Turunen.

== See also ==
- Finnish orienteers
- List of orienteers
- List of orienteering events
