= Polina Frolova =

Russian ski-orienteer

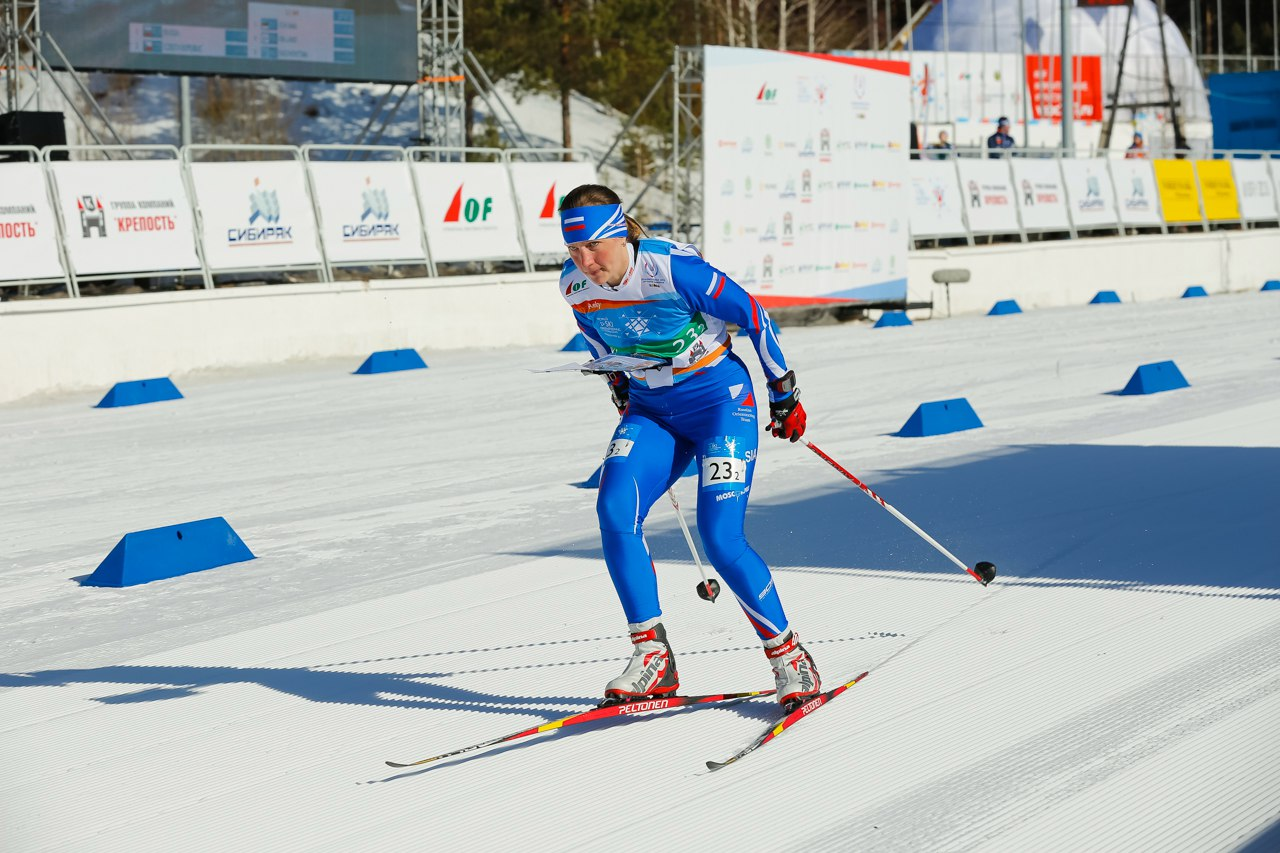

Personal information
- Native name: Полина Сергеевна Фролова
- Full name: Polina Sergeyevna Frolova
- Nationality: Russian
- Born: Polina Sergeyevna Malchikova; March 1, 1986 (age 40) Krasnoyarsk, RSFSR, Soviet Union

Sport
- Sport: Ski-orienteering
Medal record
Representing Russia
Women's ski-orienteering
World Championships
Gold medal – first place	2011 Tänndalen	Middle
Gold medal – first place	2011 Tänndalen	Relay
Gold medal – first place	2011 Tänndalen	Team sprint
Silver medal – second place	2009 Rusutsu	Relay
European Championships
Gold medal – first place	2013 Madona	Relay
Gold medal – first place	2012 Sumy	Long
Gold medal – first place	2012 Sumy	Relay
Gold medal – first place	2012 Sumy	Team sprint
Silver medal – second place	2016 Hochfilzen	Relay
Silver medal – second place	2012 Sumy	Sprint
Silver medal – second place	2011 Lillehammer	Sprint
Silver medal – second place	2011 Lillehammer	Middle
Bronze medal – third place	2015 Lenzerheide	Relay
World Cup
Bronze medal – third place	2012	Overall

Polina Sergeyevna Frolova, née Malchikova (Russian: Полина Сергеевна Фролова; born 1 March 1986) is a Russian ski-orienteering competitor, who was suspended for four years for doping.

== Biography ==
She won a gold medal in the middle distance at the 2011 World Ski Orienteering Championships in Sweden, ahead of Alena Trapeznikova and Stine Olsen Kirkevik. In 2017, Frolova was found guilty of doping and therefore stripped of all medals won in 2017 and banned from competing for 4 years.
