= Marjut =

Marjut is a given name. Notable people with the given name include:

- Marjut Heinonen (born 1976), Finnish sport shooter
- Marjut Rimminen (born 1944), Finnish animator and film director
- Marjut Rolig (born 1966), Finnish cross-country skier
- Marjut Turunen (born 1992), Finnish ski orienteering competitor
