= Vadim Tolstopyatov =

Russian ski orienteering competitor

Medal record

Representing Russia

Men's ski orienteering

World Championships
Silver medal – second place	2007 Moscow region	Sprint

Vadim Vasilyevich Tolstopyatov (Russian: Вадим Васильевич Толстопятов; born 28 February 1982 in Soldatskaya Dukhovka, Tambov Oblast, RSFSR, Soviet Union) is a Russian ski-orienteering competitor. He received a silver medal in the sprint at the 2007 World Ski Orienteering Championships, behind Eduard Khrennikov, securing Russia a double victory in this distance.
