= Kjetil Ulven =

Norwegian orienteer (born 1967)

Medal record

Representing Norway

Men's ski orienteering

World Championships
Gold medal – first place	1994 Val di Non	Relay
Bronze medal – third place	1988 Kuopio	Relay
Bronze medal – third place	1990 Skellefteå	Relay
Bronze medal – third place	1992 Pontarlier	Relay
Bronze medal – third place	1996 Lillehammer	Relay
Bronze medal – third place	1998 Windischgarsten	Short
Bronze medal – third place	2002 Borovetz	Middle

Kjetil Ulven (born 16 November 1967) is a Norwegian ski-orienteering competitor and world champion. He won a gold medal in the relay event at the World Ski Orienteering Championships in Val di Non in 1994, together with Lars Lystad, Harald Svergja and Vidar Benjaminsen. He received a bronze medal in the short distance in Windischgarsten in 1998, and a bronze medal in the middle distance in Borovetz in 2002.
