= Matti Väisänen =

Matti Väisänen may refer to:

- Matti Väisänen (politician) (1887–1939), Finnish trade union activist and politician
- Matti Väisänen (bishop) (born 1934), Finnish former priest and bishop
- Matti Väisänen (ski-orienteer) (born 1948), Finnish ski-orienteering competitor
