= Alena Trapeznikova =

Russian ski-orienteering competitor

Alena Alekseyevna Trapeznikova
Personal information
- Native name: Алёна Трапезникова
- Full name: Alena Alekseyevna Trapeznikova
- Nationality: Russian
- Born: May 30, 1987 (age 39) Komsomolsk-on-Amur, Khabarovsk Krai, Russian SFSR, Soviet Union

Sport
- Sport: Ski-orienteering
- Rank: 4
Medal record
Representing Russia
Women's Ski-orienteering
World Championships
Gold medal – first place	2017 Krasnoyarsk	Relay
Gold medal – first place	2019 Piteå	Relay
Silver medal – second place	2019 Piteå	Long
Silver medal – second place	2017 Krasnoyarsk	Long
Silver medal – second place	2011 Tänndalen	Middle
Bronze medal – third place	2019 Piteå	Middle
European Championships
Gold medal – first place	2016 Hochfilzen	Team sprint
Gold medal – first place	2011 Lillehammer	Relay
Silver medal – second place	2016 Hochfilzen	Sprint
Silver medal – second place	2016 Hochfilzen	Long

Alena Alekseyevna Trapeznikova (Russian: Алёна Алексеевна Трапезникова; born 30 May 1987) is a Russian ski-orienteering competitor. She won a silver medal in the middle distance at the 2011 World Ski Orienteering Championships in Sweden, behind Polina Malchikova and ahead of Stine Olsen Kirkevik.
