= Raili Sallinen =

Finnish ski orienteering competitor

Medal record

Representing Finland

Women's ski-orienteering

World Championships
Gold medal – first place	1975 Hyvinkää	Relay

Raili Sallinen (born 30 July 1938) is a Finnish ski orienteering competitor. At the first World Ski Orienteering Championships in 1975 held in Finland she won a gold medal with the Finnish relay team, together with Aila Flöjt and Sinikka Kukkonen, and placed fifth in the individual contest.

Her son is Kari Sallinen.

== See also ==
- Finnish orienteers
- List of orienteers
- List of orienteering events
