= Veselov =

Veselov (Russian: Веселов) is a surname. Notable people with the surname include:

- Jury Veselov (born 1982), Russian luger
- Kirill Veselov, Russian ski-orienteer
- Vitali Veselov (born 1973), Russian footballer

== See also ==
- 7457 Veselov, main-belt asteroid
- Novikov–Veselov equation
