= Aila Flöjt =

Finnish ski orienteering competitor

Medal record

Representing Finland

Women's ski-orienteering

World Championships
Gold medal – first place	1975 Hyvinkää	Relay
Gold medal – first place	1977 Velingrad	Relay

Aila Flöjt (born 22 September 1946) is a Finnish ski orienteering competitor. At the World Ski Orienteering Championships in 1975 she won a gold medal with the Finnish relay team, together with Raili Sallinen and Sinikka Kukkonen, and placed seventh in the individual contest. At the 1977 World Championships in Velingrad, Bulgaria, she won a gold medal in the relay, with Kaija Halonen and Sinikka Kukkonen, and placed fifth in the individual contest.

== See also ==
- Finnish orienteers
- List of orienteers
- List of orienteering events
