= Pepa Milusheva =

Bulgarian ski-orienteer

Medal record

Representing Bulgaria

Women's ski orienteering

World Championships
| Gold medal – first place | 1994 Val di Non | Classic |

Pepa Milusheva (Pepa Miloucheva) (Bulgarian: Пепа Милушева) is a Bulgarian ski-orienteering competitor and world champion. She won a gold medal in the classic distance at the World Ski Orienteering Championships in Val di Non in 1994, before Virpi Juutilainen. She finished 4th in the short distance, and 5th in the relay event with the Bulgarian team in 1994.

She has been head coach of the Craftsbury Nordic Ski Club in Craftsbury Common, Vermont, since 1998. During this time she also worked as a massage therapist and fleet manager at the Craftsbury Outdoor Center. When the center was bought in 2008 and turned into a non-profit, the Center began supporting a post-collegiate cross-country racing team, named the Craftsbury Green Racing Project. Pepa is now also head coach of this team, and no longer works as massage therapist or fleet manager at the center.

She also was a junior champion at ping pong. When she was 12, she won a national championship in ping pong in her home country of Bulgaria.

== See also ==
- Bulgarian orienteers
- List of orienteers
- List of orienteering events
