= Lars Lystad =

Norwegian orienteer

Medal record

Representing Norway

Men's ski orienteering

World Championships
Gold medal – first place	1986 Batak	Relay
Gold medal – first place	1994 Val di Non	Relay
Silver medal – second place	1994 Val di Non	Classic
Bronze medal – third place	1988 Kuopio	Relay
Bronze medal – third place	1992 Pontarlier	Relay
Bronze medal – third place	1996 Lillehammer	Relay

World Cup
Silver medal – second place	1993	Overall WC

Lars Lystad is a Norwegian ski-orienteering competitor and world champion. He won a gold medal in the relay event at the World Ski Orienteering Championships in Batak in 1986, together with Sigurd Dæhli, Audun Knutsen and Vidar Benjaminsen, and again in Val di Non in 1994, with Kjetil Ulven, Harald Svergja and Vidar Benjaminsen. He received a silver medal in the long distance in 1994.

He finished second in the overall World Cup in Ski Orienteering in 1993.
