= Bertil Nordqvist =

Swedish ski-orienteer

Medal record

Representing Sweden

Men's ski orienteering

World Championships
Gold medal – first place	1996 Lillehammer	Relay
Silver medal – second place	2005 Levi	Sprint
Bronze medal – third place	1996 Lillehammer	Long
Bronze medal – third place	2002 Borovetz	Long

World Cup
Silver medal – second place	2003	Overall WC
Bronze medal – third place	1997	Overall WC
Bronze medal – third place	1999	Overall WC

Bertil Nordqvist is a Swedish ski-orienteering competitor and world champion.

== Ski orienteering ==
He competed at the 1996 World Ski Orienteering Championships in Lillehammer, where he won a gold medal in the relay event, together with Per-Ove Bergqvist, Mikael Lindmark and Björn Lans. He has received one individual silver medal and two bronze medals in the world championships.

At the World Cup in Ski Orienteering in 2003 Nordqvist finished overall second, behind winner Eduard Khrennikov. He finished overall third in 1997 and in 1999.
