= Sirpa Kukkonen =

Finnish ski-orienteering competitor

Medal record

Representing Finland

Women's Ski-orienteering

World Championships
Gold medal – first place	1988 Kuopio	Relay
Silver medal – second place	1982 Aigen	Relay
Bronze medal – third place	1982 Aigen	Individual
Bronze medal – third place	1988 Kuopio	Long
Bronze medal – third place	1988 Kuopio	Short

Sirpa Kukkonen (born 7 December 1958 in Tervo) is a Finnish ski-orienteering competitor and World Champion.

Kukkonen won a silver medal in the relay, with teammates Sinikka Kukkonen and Mirja Puhakka, and a bronze medal in the individual event at the 1982 World Ski Orienteering Championships.

At the 1988 World Championships she won a gold medal in the relay with the Finnish team, with Anne Benjaminsen and Virpi Juutilainen, and also bronze medals in both the long course and in the short course.

== See also ==
- Finnish orienteers
- List of orienteers
- List of orienteering events
