= Erja Jokinen =

Finnish ski-orienteering competitor (born 1979)

Medal record

Representing Finland

Women's ski orienteering

World Championships
Gold medal – first place	2004 Østersund	Relay
Silver medal – second place	2002 Borovetz	Long
Silver medal – second place	2002 Borovetz	Middle
Silver medal – second place	2002 Borovetz	Sprint
Silver medal – second place	2005 Levi	Middle
Silver medal – second place	2005 Levi	Sprint
Silver medal – second place	2007 Moscow region	Relay
Bronze medal – third place	2002 Borovetz	Relay
Bronze medal – third place	2005 Levi	Relay

Junior World Championships
Gold medal – first place	1998 Velogozh	Classic

Erja Jokinen (born February 5, 1979) is a Finnish ski-orienteering competitor. She won a gold medal in the relay event at the 2004 World Ski Orienteering Championships. She received a total of eight silver and bronze medals at the World Championships in 2002, 2005 and 2007. Jokinen became Junior World Champion in 1998.

== See also ==
- Finnish orienteers
- List of orienteers
- List of orienteering events
