= Anssi Juutilainen =

Finnish ski-orienteer

Medal record

Representing Finland

Men's Ski-orienteering

World Championships
Gold medal – first place	1984 Lavarone	Classic
Gold medal – first place	1990 Skellefteå	Long
Gold medal – first place	1990 Skellefteå	Short
Silver medal – second place	1986 Batak	Classic
Bronze medal – third place	1988 Kuopio	Long
Bronze medal – third place	1988 Kuopio	Short

World Cup
Gold medal – first place	1991	Overall WC
Bronze medal – third place	1989	Overall WC

Anssi Juutilainen (born 1 October 1956) is a Finnish ski-orienteering competitor and world champion.

He received an individual gold medal in the classic course at the 1984 World Ski Orienteering Championships in Lavarone, and a gold medal both in the short course and the long course in Skellefteå in 1990.

He finished first overall in the World Cup in Ski Orienteering in 1991, and third in 1989.

== See also ==
- Finnish orienteers
- List of orienteers
- List of orienteering events
