= Sanna Savolainen =

Finnish ski-orienteering competitor

Medal record

Representing Finland

Women's Ski-orienteering

World Championships
Silver medal – second place	1994 Val di Non	Short
Bronze medal – third place	1994 Val di Non	Relay

Sanna Savolainen is a Finnish ski-orienteering competitor. She won silver medal in the short distance at the 1994 World Ski Orienteering Championships.

== See also ==
- Finnish orienteers
- List of orienteers
- List of orienteering events
