= Marte Reenaas =

Norwegian orienteer (born 1979)

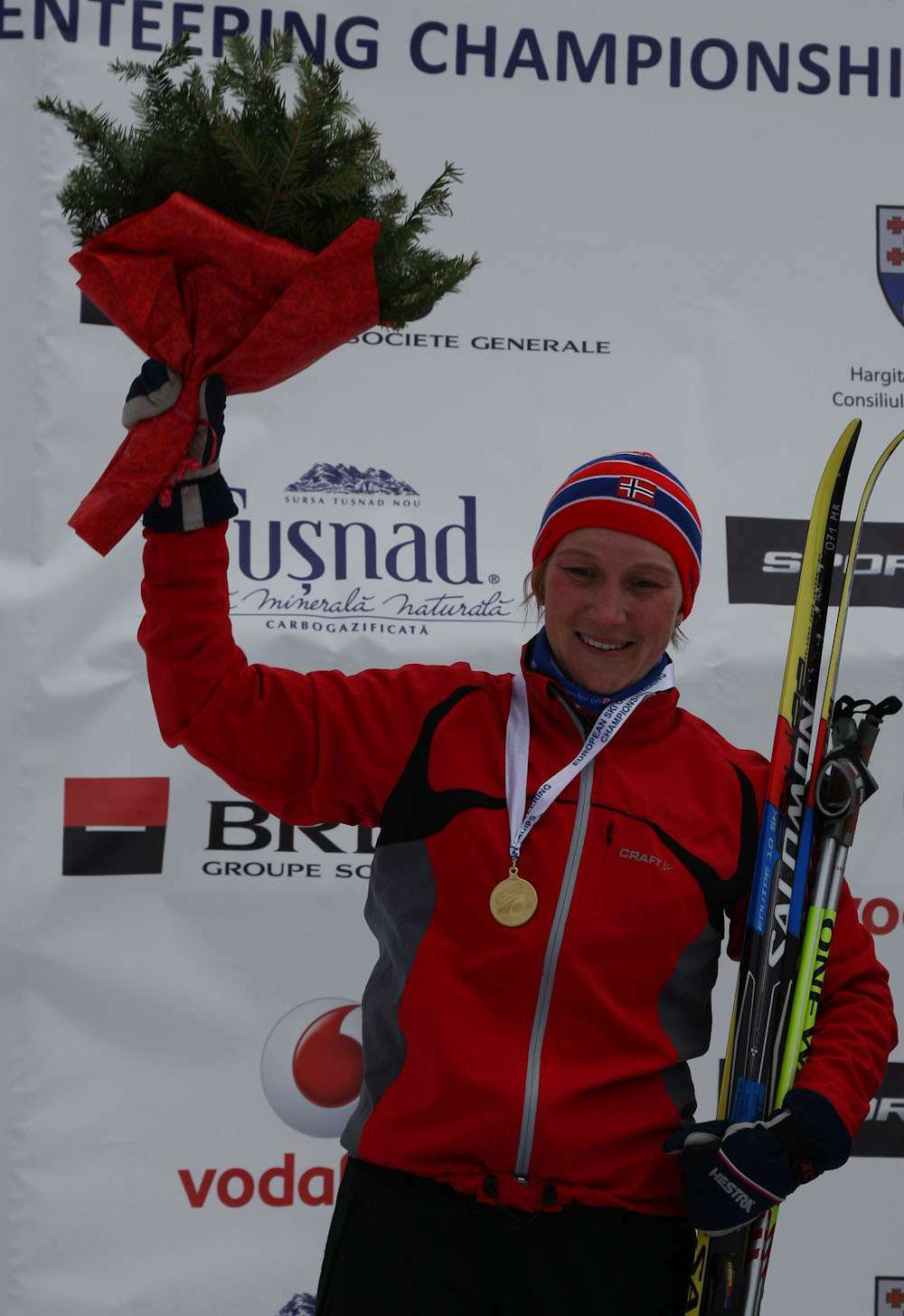
- Marte Reenaas with gold medal at Ski-EOC 2010

Medal record

Representing Norway

Women's ski orienteering

World Championships
Gold medal – first place	2005 Levi	Relay
Bronze medal – third place	2007 Moscow	Long

Marte Reenaas (born 20 January 1979) is a Norwegian ski-orienteering competitor and world champion. She won a gold medal in the relay event at the World Ski Orienteering Championships in Levi in 2005, together with Kjersti Reenaas and Stine Hjermstad Kirkevik. She received a bronze medal in the long distance in Moscow in 2007.
