= Bengt Leandersson =

Swedish ski orienteering competitor

Medal record

Representing Sweden

Men's ski orienteering

World Championships
Silver medal – second place	2004 Åsarna/Östersund	Sprint

Bengt Leandersson is a Swedish ski-orienteering competitor. He won a silver medal in the sprint distance at the 2004 World Ski Orienteering Championships in Åsarna/Östersund in Sweden.
