= Vladimir Barchukov =

Russian ski orienteering competitor

Personal information
- Born: 9 October 1984 (age 41)

Sport
- Sport: Ski orienteering
- Club: Krasnoyarsk
Medal record
Representing Russia
Men's ski orienteering
World Championships
Bronze medal – third place	2011 Tänndalen	Long

Vladimir Barchukov (born 9 October 1984) is a Russian ski orienteering competitor.

He won a bronze medal in the long distance at the 2011 World Ski Orienteering Championships.
