= Janne Häkkinen =

Finnish orienteer

Personal information
- Born: 28 May 1984 (age 42)

Sport
- Sport: Ski orienteering; Orienteering
- Club: Suunta Jyvaskyla
Medal record
Representing Finland
Men's ski orienteering
World Championships
| Silver medal – second place | 2013 Ridder | Long |

Janne Häkkinen (born 28 May 1984) is a Finnish orienteering and ski orienteering competitor.

He won a silver medal in the long distance at the 2013 World Ski Orienteering Championships.
