= Nicolò Corradini (skier) =

Italian ski-orienteer (born 1964)

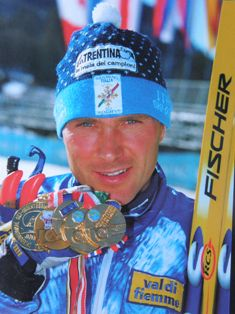

Medal record

Representing Italy

Men's Ski-orienteering

World Championships
Gold medal – first place	1994 Val di Non	Long
Gold medal – first place	1994 Val di Non	Short
Gold medal – first place	1996 Lillehammer	Long
Gold medal – first place	2000 Krasnoyarsk	Short
Bronze medal – third place	1998 Windischgarsten	Long

Nicolò Corradini (born October 20, 1964) is an Italian ski-orienteering competitor and world champion.

Corradini is an athlete of the G.S. Fiamme Oro.

== Biography ==
He received a gold medal in the long course at the 1994, 1996 World Ski Orienteering Championships, in the short (now middle) distance he shared the first place in 1994 with Ivan Kuzmin and won short distance in 2000, also he received a bronze medal in 1998 in the long.
