= Sonja Johannesson =

Swedish ski-orienteering competitor

Medal record

Representing Sweden

Women's ski orienteering

World Championships
Silver medal – second place	1977 Velingrad	Classic
Silver medal – second place	1977 Velingrad	Relay

Sonja Johannesson is a Swedish ski-orienteering competitor. She won a silver medal in the classic distance at the 1977 World Ski Orienteering Championships in Velingrad, and a silver medal in the relay.
