= Lena Isaksson =

Swedish ski-orienteering competitor

Medal record

Representing Sweden

Women's ski orienteering

World Championships
Gold medal – first place	1984 Lavarone	Relay
Silver medal – second place	1984 Lavarone	Classic

Lena Isaksson is a Swedish ski-orienteering competitor. She won a silver medal in the classic distance at the 1984 World Ski Orienteering Championships in Lavarone, and a gold medal in the relay, together with Marie Gustafsson and Ann Larsson.
