= Kirill Veselov =

Russian ski-orienteer

Personal information
- Native name: Кирилл Владимирович Веселов
- Full name: Kirill Vladimirovich Veselov
- Nationality: Russian
- Born: January 11, 1983 (age 43) Tomsk, RSFSR, Soviet Union

Sport
- Sport: Ski-orienteering
- Rank: 7
Medal record
Representing Russia
Men's ski orienteering
World Championships
Gold medal – first place	2017 Krasnoyarsk	Relay
Gold medal – first place	2015 Hamar / Løten	Relay
Gold medal – first place	2013 Ridder	Relay
Gold medal – first place	2007 Moscow Oblast	Relay
Silver medal – second place	2017 Krasnoyarsk	Long
Silver medal – second place	2007 Moscow	Long
Bronze medal – third place	2013 Ridder	Sprint
Bronze medal – third place	2013 Ridder	Middle
Bronze medal – third place	2007 Moscow Oblast	Middle
European Championships
Gold medal – first place	2013 Madona	Mixed Relay
Gold medal – first place	2011 Lillehammer	Relay
Silver medal – second place	2013 Madona	Relay
Bronze medal – third place	2006 Ivanovo	Relay

Kirill Vladimirovich Veselov (Russian: Кирилл Владимирович Веселов) is a Russian ski-orienteering competitor and world champion. He won a gold medal in the relay event at the World Ski Orienteering Championships in Moscow in 2007, together with Andrei Gruzdev and Eduard Khrennikov, and received a silver medal in the long course and a bronze medal in the middle distance.
