= Lena Hasselström =

Swedish ski-orienteering competitor

Medal record

Representing Sweden

Women's ski-orienteering

World Championships
Gold medal – first place	2002 Borovetz	Long
Gold medal – first place	2002 Borovetz	Sprint
Silver medal – second place	1998 Windischgarsten	Short
Silver medal – second place	2000 Krasnoyarsk	Short
Bronze medal – third place	1998 Windischgarsten	Long
Bronze medal – third place	2002 Borovetz	Middle

World Cup
Gold medal – first place	2000	Overall WC
Gold medal – first place	2001	Overall WC
Silver medal – second place	1995	Overall WC
Silver medal – second place	1999	Overall WC

Women's orienteering

Junior World Championships
Gold medal – first place	1992 Jyväskylä	Relay

Lena Hasselström (born 6 February 1972) is a Swedish ski-orienteering competitor, world champion and winner of the overall world cup.

She won two individual gold medals at the 2002 World Ski Orienteering Championships in Borovetz, in the long course and in sprint. She won the overall World Cup in Ski Orienteering in 2000 and in 2001, and finished second in 1995 and 1999.
