= Hannele Tonna =

Finnish ski-orienteer

Medal record

Representing Finland

Women's Ski-orienteering

World Championships
| Gold medal – first place | 2009 Rusutsu | Sprint |
| Silver medal – second place | 2004 Östersund | Long |
| Silver medal – second place | 2007 Moscow | Long |

Hannele Tonna (née Valkonen, born January 3, 1978) is a Finnish ski-orienteering competitor and World Champion. She won a gold medal in the sprint at the 2009 World Ski Orienteering Championships. She won silver medals in the long distance in 2004, and again in 2007.

She is married to Eivind Tonna.

== See also ==
- Finnish orienteers
- List of orienteers
- List of orienteering events
