= Ann Larsson =

Swedish ski orienteer

Medal record

Representing Sweden

Women's ski orienteering

World Championships
Gold medal – first place	1984 Lavarone	Relay
Silver medal – second place	1980 Avesta	Relay
Bronze medal – third place	1980 Avesta	Classic
Bronze medal – third place	1984 Lavarone	Classic

Ann Larsson is a Swedish ski-orienteering competitor. She won a bronze medal in the classic distance at the 1980 World Ski Orienteering Championships in Avesta, where she also won a silver medal in the relay. At the 1984 World Championships in Lavarone she again won a bronze medal in the classic distance, and a gold medal in the relay, together with Marie Gustafsson and Lena Isaksson.
