= Pertti Tikka =

Finnish ski-orienteer

Medal record

Representing Finland

Men's ski orienteering

World Championships
Gold medal – first place	1980 Avesta	Individual
Silver medal – second place	1982 Aigen	Individual
Silver medal – second place	1980 Avesta	Relay
Bronze medal – third place	1984 Lavarone	Individual
Bronze medal – third place	1982 Aigen	Relay

Pertti Tikka (born 12 May 1955 in Tohmajärvi) is a Finnish ski-orienteering competitor and world champion. He received an individual gold medal at the World Ski Orienteering Championships in Avesta in 1980. He received a silver medal in 1982, and a bronze medal in 1984.

== See also ==
- Finnish orienteers
- List of orienteers
- List of orienteering events
