= Svetlana Haustova =

Russian ski-orienteering competitor (born 1968)

Medal record

Representing Russia

Women's ski orienteering

World Championships
Silver medal – second place	1996 Lillehammer	Relay
Bronze medal – third place	1996 Lillehammer	Sprint
Bronze medal – third place	2000 Krasnoyarsk	Relay

Svetlana Haustova (Russian: Хаустова Светлана Анатольевна; born June 30, 1968) is a Russian ski-orienteering competitor. She won a bronze medal in the short distance at the 1996 World Ski Orienteering Championships in Lillehammer, and a silver medal with the Russian relay team.
