= Ivan Kuzmin =

Russian ski-orienteer

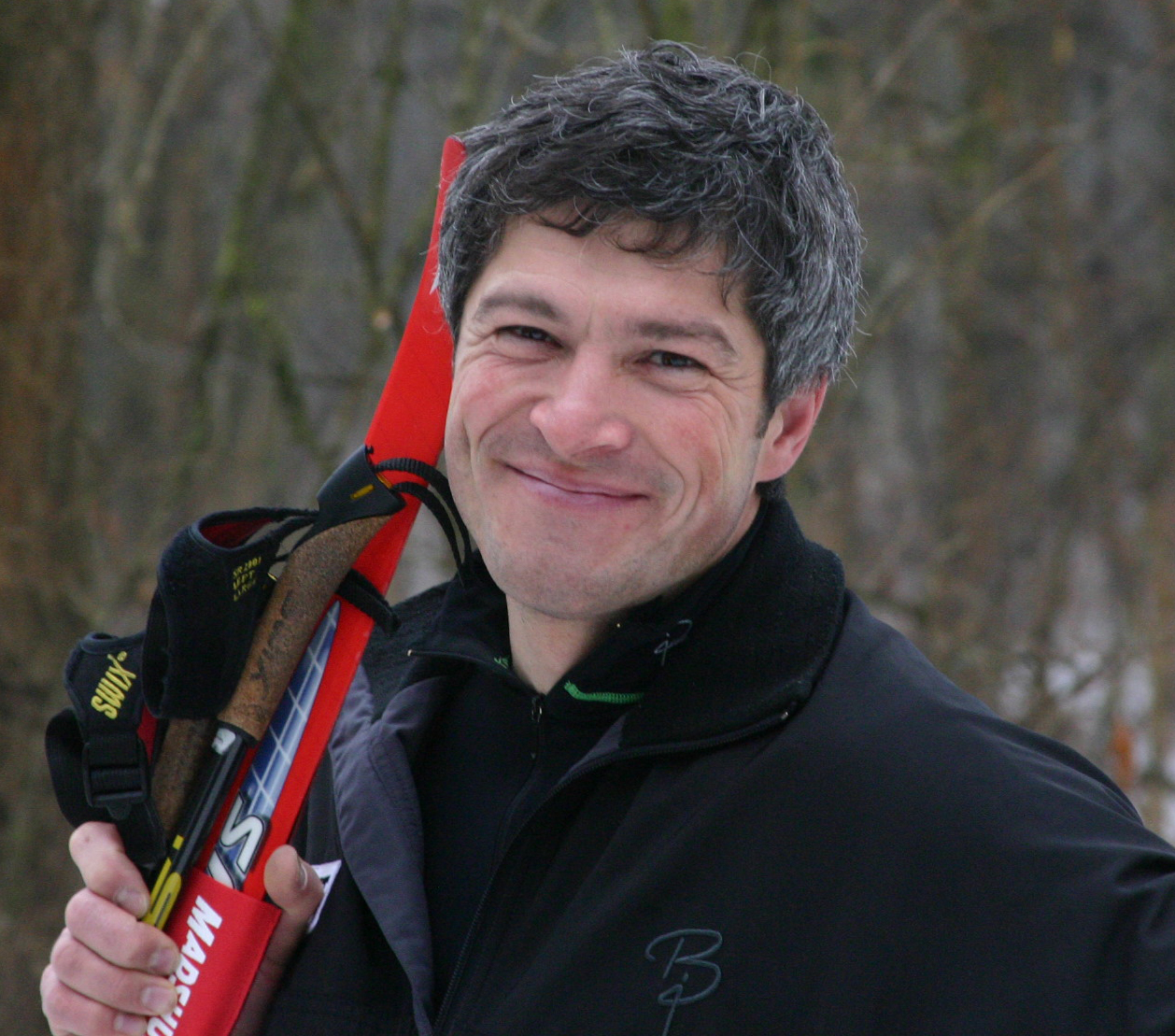

Medal record

Representing Russia

Men's ski orienteering

World Championships
Gold medal – first place	1994 Val di Non	Short
Bronze medal – third place	1992 Pontarlier	Long
Bronze medal – third place	1992 Pontarlier	Short

Ivan Kuzmin (born 25 April 1962) is a Russian ski-orienteering competitor and world champion. He received a gold medal in the short distance at the 1994 World Ski Orienteering Championships in Val di Non, shared with Nicolo Corradini.
