= Tobias Åslund =

Swedish ski orienteer

Medal record

Men's ski orienteering

Representing Sweden

World Championships
Bronze medal – third place	2005 Levi	Sprint
Bronze medal – third place	2005 Levi	Relay

Tobias Åslund is a Swedish ski-orienteering competitor. He won a bronze medal in the sprint distance at the 2005 World Ski Orienteering Championships in Levi, a bronze medal with the Swedish relay team, and placed fifth in the long distance.
