= Jan-Erik Thorn =

Swedish ski orienteer

Medal record

Representing Sweden

Men's ski orienteering

World Championships
| Gold medal – first place | 1980 Avesta | Relay |
| Silver medal – second place | 1980 Avesta | Classic |

Jan-Erik Thorn is a Swedish ski-orienteering competitor and world champion. He received a silver medal in the classic distance at the World Ski Orienteering Championships in Avesta in 1980, and received a gold medal with the Swedish relay team.
