= Gion Schnyder =

Swiss orienteering competitor

Personal information
- Born: 1986 (age 39–40)

Sport
- Sport: Ski orienteering; Orienteering
- Club: OLG Zurich (Foot-O); SkiO Swiss (Ski-O); Varska OK Peko
Medal record
Representing Switzerland
Men's ski orienteering
World Championships
Bronze medal – third place	2019 Piteå	Middle

Gion Schnyder (born 1986) is a Swiss orienteering and ski orienteering competitor.

He won a bronze medal in the middle distance at the 2019 World Ski Orienteering Championships.
