= Örjan Svahn =

Swedish ski-orienteer

Medal record

Representing Sweden

Men's ski orienteering

World Championships
Gold medal – first place	1977 Velingrad	Classic
Gold medal – first place	1977 Velingrad	Relay

Örjan Svahn is a Swedish ski-orienteering competitor and world champion. He won a gold medal in the classic distance at the World Ski Orienteering Championships in Velingrad in 1977, and received a gold medal with the Swedish relay team.
