= Claes Berglund =

Swedish ski orienteer

Medal record

Representing Sweden

Men's ski orienteering

World Championships
Gold medal – first place	1986 Batak	Classic

Claes Berglund is a Swedish ski-orienteering competitor and world champion. He won a gold medal in the classic distance at the World Ski Orienteering Championships in Batak in 1986, and he was part of the Swedish relay team, which placed fourth.
