= Hannu Koponen =

Finnish ski orienteering competitor

Medal record

Representing Finland

Men's ski orienteering

World Championships
| Gold medal – first place | 1988 Kuopio | Short |
| Gold medal – first place | 1988 Kuopio | Relay |
| Silver medal – second place | 1988 Kuopio | Long |
| Bronze medal – third place | 1986 Batak | Classic |
| Bronze medal – third place | 1986 Batak | Relay |

Hannu Koponen (born 8 November 1959 in Kaavi) is a Finnish ski-orienteering competitor and world champion.

== Awards ==
He received a gold medal in the short course, a gold medal in the relay, and a silver medal in the long course at the 1988 World Ski Orienteering Championships in Kuopio.

== See also ==
- Finnish orienteers
- List of orienteers
- List of orienteering events
