= Audhild Bakken Rognstad =

Norwegian orienteer (born 1991)

Personal information
- Born: 16 February 1991 (age 35)

Sport
- Sport: Ski orienteering
- Club: NTNUI
Medal record
Representing Norway
Women's ski orienteering
World Championships
Silver medal – second place	2015 Hamar / Løten	Sprint

Audhild Bakken Rognstad (born 16 February 1991) is a Norwegian ski orienteering competitor.

At the 2015 World Ski Orienteering Championships she won a silver medal in women's sprint, while she placed 5th in the middle distance and 8th in the long distance.
