= Andrey Grigoriev =

Russian ski orienteering competitor

Personal information
- Born: 16 May 1984 (age 42)

Sport
- Sport: Ski orienteering
- Club: Krasnoyarsk
Medal record
Representing Russia
Men's ski orienteering
World Championships
Gold medal – first place	2011 Tänndalen	Long
Gold medal – first place	2011 Tänndalen	Mixed sprint relay
Bronze medal – third place	2013 Ridder	Relay
Bronze medal – third place	2017 Krasnoyarsk	Relay

Andrey Grigoriev (born 16 May 1984) is a Russian ski orienteering competitor.

He won a gold medal in the long distance and in the sprint relay at the 2011 World Ski Orienteering Championships.
