= Vladislav Kormtshikov =

Russian ski-orienteer

Medal record

Representing Russia

Men's ski orienteering

World Championships
Gold medal – first place	2000 Krasnoyarsk	Long
Bronze medal – third place	1994 Val di Non	Long

Vladislav Kormtshikov (Russian: Владислав Кормщиков; Vladislav Kormshchikov, born 15 July 1967) is a Russian ski-orienteering competitor and world champion. He received a gold medal in the long distance at the 2000 World Ski Orienteering Championships in Krasnoyarsk.
