= Yuliya Tarasenko (orienteer) =

Russian ski orienteering competitor (born 1984)

Personal information
- Full name: Yuliya Vyacheslavovna Tarasenko
- Born: 21 January 1984 (age 42)

Sport
- Sport: Ski orienteering
Medal record
Representing Russia
World championships
| Gold medal – first place | 2013 Ridder | Relay |
| Gold medal – first place | 2015 Hamar / Løten | Mixed Sprint |
| Bronze medal – third place | 2015 Hamar / Løten | Relay |
European championships
| Gold medal – first place | 2013 Madona | Middle distance |

Yuliya Vyacheslavovna Tarasenko (née Bronnikova, Russian: Юлия Вячеславовна Тарасенко-Бронникова; born 21 January 1984) is a Russian ski orienteering competitor. In 2013, she won a world title in the relay and a European title in the middle distance. Tarasenko teaches ski orienteering at the Academy of Winter Sports and at the Siberian Federal University in Krasnoyarsk. She has a son, born in 2010. Her husband is also a competitive ski orienteerer.
