= Josefine Heikka =

Swedish ski-orienteering competitor

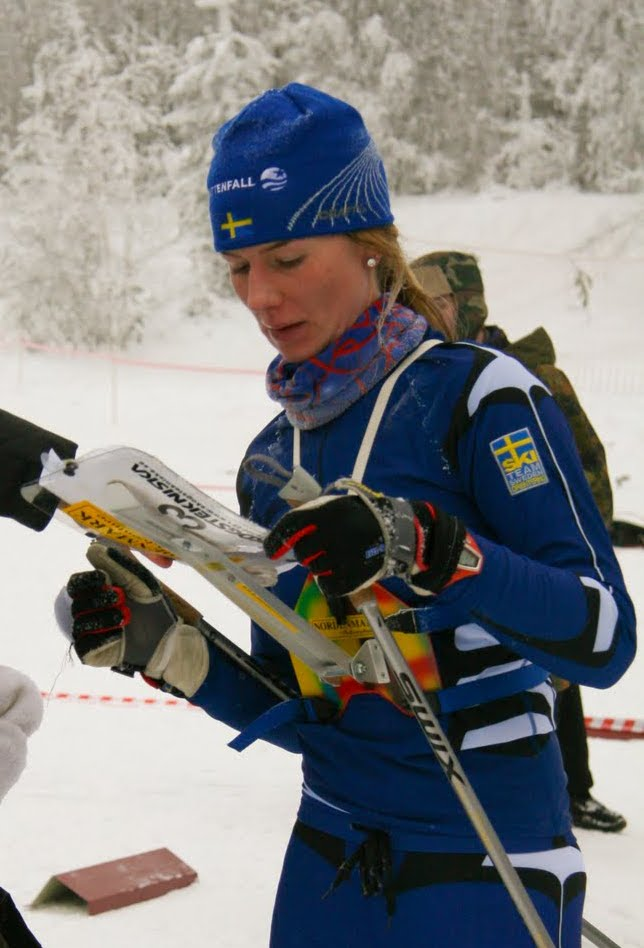

Medal record

Representing Sweden

Women's Ski-orienteering

World Championships
Gold medal – first place	2015 Hamar / Løten	Long
Gold medal – first place	2015 Hamar / Løten	Relay
Gold medal – first place	2009 Rusutsu	Relay
Silver medal – second place	2013 Ridder	Relay
Bronze medal – third place	2015 Hamar / Løten	Sprint
Bronze medal – third place	2015 Hamar / Løten	Mixed Sprint
Bronze medal – third place	2013 Ridder	Middle
Bronze medal – third place	2013 Ridder	Long
Bronze medal – third place	2009 Rusutsu	Middle

Josefine Heikka (née Engström; born 1 September 1986) is a Swedish ski-orienteering competitor and world champion. She won a gold medal in the relay at the 2009 World Ski Orienteering Championships, with team members Helene Söderlund and Marie Ohlsson, and a bronze medal in the middle-distance event. She also won the gold medal during the 2015 World Championships long-distance event.
