= Tero Linnainmaa =

Finnish orienteer (born 1992)

Personal information
- Born: 1992 (age 33–34)

Sport
- Sport: Ski orienteering; Mountain bike orienteering; Orienteering
- Club: Ikaalisten Nouseva Voima (Foot-O); KyrosRasti (Ski-O, MTB-O)
Medal record
Representing Finland
Men's ski orienteering
World Championships
| Bronze medal – third place | 2019 Piteå | Long |

Tero Linnainmaa (born 1992) is a Finnish orienteering, ski orienteering and mountain bike orienteering competitor.

He won a bronze medal in the long distance at the 2019 World Ski Orienteering Championships.
