= Peter Arnesson =

Swedish ski-orienteering competitor

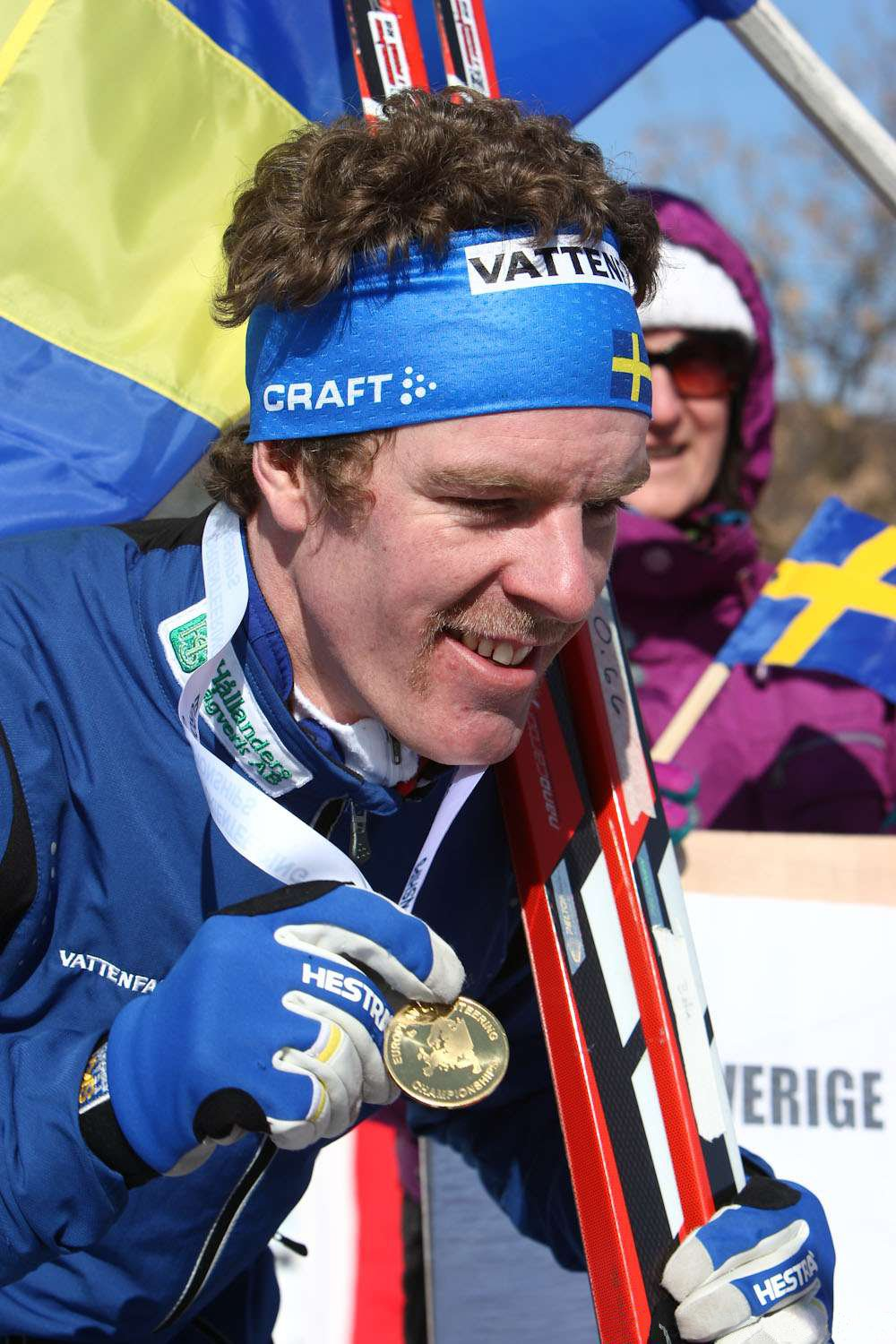

Medal record

Representing Sweden

Men's ski orienteering

World Championships
Bronze medal – third place	2004 Åsarna/Östersund	Sprint

World Cup
Silver medal – second place	2007/2008	Overall WC

Junior World Championships
Bronze medal – third place	1999 Banská Bystrica	Classic
Bronze medal – third place	2000 Jundola	Short

Peter Arnesson (born 23 June 1980) is a Swedish ski-orienteering competitor. He won a bronze medal in the sprint distance at the 2004 World Ski Orienteering Championships in Åsarna/Östersund in Sweden, and placed fourth with the Swedish relay team, and fifth in the middle distance. He placed overall second in the World Cup in Ski Orienteering in the 2007/2008 season.
