= Lars Moholdt =

Norwegian orienteer (born 1985)

Personal information
- Born: 25 March 1985 (age 41)

Sport
- Sport: Ski orienteering
- Club: Wing OK
Medal record
Representing Norway
Men's ski orienteering
World Championships
Gold medal – first place	2015 Hamar / Løten	Long
Bronze medal – third place	2011 Tänndalen	Relay
Bronze medal – third place	2015 Hamar / Løten	Middle
Bronze medal – third place	2017 Krasnoyarsk	Long
Bronze medal – third place	2017 Krasnoyarsk	Middle

Lars Moholdt (born 25 March 1985) is a Norwegian ski orienteering competitor.

He won a gold medal in the long distance at the 2015 World Ski Orienteering Championships.
