= Virpi Juutilainen =

Finnish ski-orienteer

Medal record

Representing Finland

Women's Ski-orienteering

World Championships
Gold medal – first place	1988 Kuopio	Long
Gold medal – first place	1988 Kuopio	Relay
Gold medal – first place	1994 Val di Non	Short
Silver medal – second place	1994 Val di Non	Long
Bronze medal – third place	1986 Batak	Long

World Cup
Gold medal – first place	1989	Overall WC
Bronze medal – third place	1991	Overall WC

Virpi Juutilainen (born 11 June 1961) is a Finnish ski-orienteering competitor and world champion.

She received an individual gold medal in the long distance at the 1988 World Ski Orienteering Championships in Kuopio, and a gold medal in the short course in Val di Non in 1994. In 1988, she also won a gold medal in the relay at the World Championships, together with teammates Sirpa Kukkonen and Anne Benjaminsen.

She finished first overall in the World Cup in Ski Orienteering in 1989, and third in 1991.

== See also ==
- Finnish orienteers
- List of orienteers
- List of orienteering events
