= Lena Samuelsson =

Swedish ski-orienteering competitor

Medal record

Representing Sweden

Women's ski orienteering

World Championships
Silver medal – second place	1975 Hyvinkää	Relay
Bronze medal – third place	1975 Hyvinkää	Classic

Lena Samuelsson is a Swedish ski-orienteering competitor. She won a bronze medal in the classic distance at the 1975 World Ski Orienteering Championships in Hyvinkää, and a silver medal in the relay.
