= Matti Keskinarkaus =

Finnish mountain bike orienteer

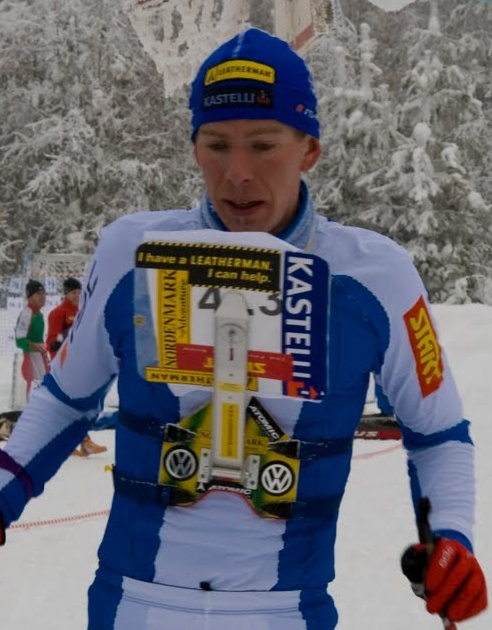
- World Cup 2010

Medal record

Representing Finland

Men's Ski-orienteering

World Championships
Gold medal – first place	2002 Borovetz	Long
Gold medal – first place	2005 Levi	Sprint

World Cup
Gold medal – first place	2001	Overall WC

Ski-JWOC
Gold medal – first place	1996 B.Bystrica	Classic distance
Silver medal – second place	1996 B.Bystrica	Short distance
Gold medal – first place	1996 B.Bystrica	Relay

Matti Keskinarkaus (born 28 February 1976) is a Finnish ski-orienteering and mountain bike orienteering competitor. He is ski-O world champion and winner of the overall ski-O world cup year 2001.

== Ski Orienteering career ==
He received a gold medal in the long course at the 2002 World Ski Orienteering Championships in Borovetz, and a gold medal in Levi, Finland in 2005.

He has received two gold medals and one silver medal at the Junior World Ski Orienteering Championships

He finished overall first in the World Cup in Ski Orienteering in 2001.

== Mountain Bike Orienteering career ==
Matti received a gold medal in middle distance European Championships year 2006.

== See also ==
- Finnish orienteers
- List of orienteers
- List of orienteering events
