= Erik Rost =

Swedish ski-orienteer

Personal information
- Nationality: Swedish
- Born: 3 May 1985 (age 41)

Sport
- Sport: Ski orienteering
Medal record
Representing Sweden
Men's ski orienteering
World Championships
Gold medal – first place	2017 Krasnoyarsk	Long
Gold medal – first place	2017 Krasnoyarsk	Team sprint
Silver medal – second place	2017 Krasnoyarsk	Middle
Silver medal – second place	2017 Krasnoyarsk	Relay
Silver medal – second place	2015 Hamar / Løten	Relay
Silver medal – second place	2011 Tänndalen	Relay
Bronze medal – third place	2015 Hamar / Løten	Sprint
Silver medal – second place	2015 Hamar / Løten	Team sprint
World Cup
Gold medal – first place	2007/2008	Overall WC
Junior World Championships
Gold medal – first place	2005 S-chanf	Sprint
Gold medal – first place	2005 S-chanf	Middle
Gold medal – first place	2005 S-chanf	Long
Silver medal – second place	2004 Vuokatti	Long
Bronze medal – third place	2004 Vuokatti	Middle
Men's orienteering
Junior World Championships
Bronze medal – third place	2005 Tenero	Relay

Erik Rost (born May 30, 1985) is a Swedish ski-orienteering competitor, winner of the overall world cup, and junior world champion.

== Ski orienteering ==
Rost won the overall World Cup in Ski Orienteering in 2007/2008.

He received three individual gold medals at the Junior World Ski Orienteering Championships in 2005.

== Orienteering ==
He also was a member of Swedish junior team at Junior World Orienteering Championships 2005 and received a bronze medal in relay with John Fredriksson and Mikael Kristensson
