= Marjut Turunen =

Finnish ski orienteering competitor (born 1992)

Personal information
- Born: 18 January 1992 (age 34)

Sport
- Sport: Ski orienteering
- Club: SK Vuoksi
Medal record
Representing Finland
Women's ski orienteering
World Championships
Silver medal – second place	2015 Hamar / Løten	Middle

Marjut Turunen (born 18 January 1992) is a Finnish ski orienteering competitor.

She won a silver medal in the middle distance at the 2015 World Ski Orienteering Championships, behind Milka Reponen.
