= Liisa Anttila =

Finnish orienteer and ski-orienteer

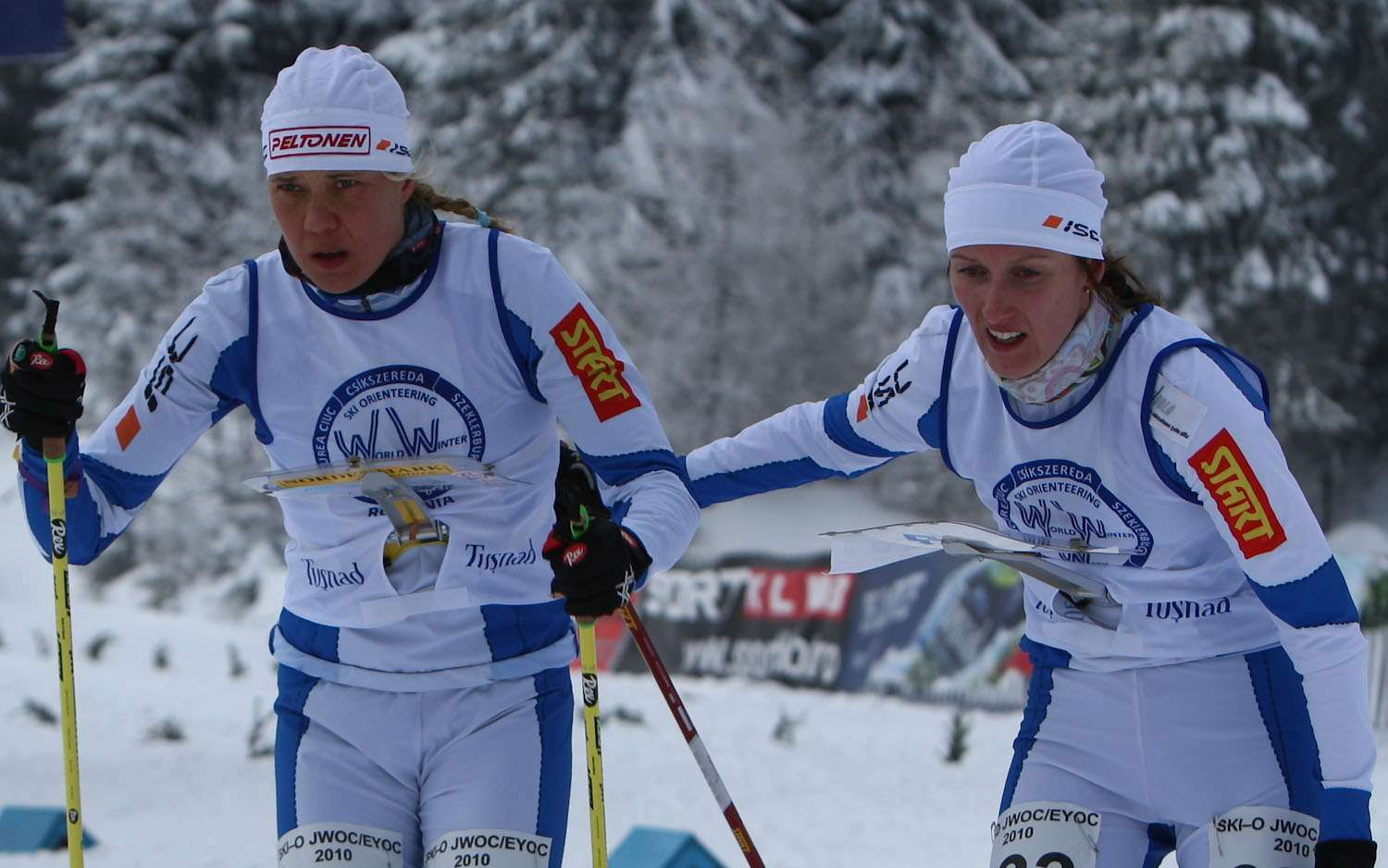
- Anttila (left) in 2010

Personal information
- Born: 30 September 1974 (age 51) Luopioinen, Finland

Sport
- Sport: Orienteering; Ski orienteering
Medal record
Representing Finland
Women's orienteering
World Championships
Gold medal – first place	2001 Tampere	Relay
Junior World Championships
Gold medal – first place	1993 Kastelruth	Long
Silver medal – second place	1993 Kastelruth	Relay
Bronze medal – third place	1993 Kastelruth	Middle
Women's ski-orienteering
World Championships
Gold medal – first place	1998 Austria	Relay
Gold medal – first place	1998 Austria	Classic distance
Gold medal – first place	2000 Russia	Relay
Gold medal – first place	2004 Sweden	Relay
Silver medal – second place	2000 Russia	Classic distance
Silver medal – second place	2004 Sweden	Sprint
Silver medal – second place	2007 Russia	Middle distance
Silver medal – second place	2007 Russia	Relay
Bronze medal – third place	1998 Austria	Short distance
Bronze medal – third place	2000 Russia	Short distance
Bronze medal – third place	2005 Finland	Relay
Bronze medal – third place	2007 Russia	Sprint
Junior World Championships
Gold medal – first place	1994 Rovaniemi	Classic distance
Gold medal – first place	1994 Rovaniemi	Short distance
Gold medal – first place	1994 Rovaniemi	Relay

Liisa Anttila (born 30 September 1974) is a Finnish orienteering and ski-orienteering champion.

== Orienteering ==
Anttila won a gold medal in the relay event at the 2001 World Orienteering Championships in Tampere with the Finnish team. She became Junior World Orienteering Champion in the classic distance in 1993.

== Ski orienteering ==
Anttila has won four gold medals, four silver medals and four bronze medals at the World Ski Orienteering Championships, from 1998 to 2007. She also has three gold medals at the Junior World Ski Orienteering Championships

== See also ==
- Finnish orienteers
- List of orienteers
- List of orienteering events
