= Andrei Gruzdev =

Russian ski orienteer

Medal record

Representing Russia

Men's ski orienteering

World Championships
Gold medal – first place	2002 Borovetz	Sprint
Gold medal – first place	2005 Levi	Middle
Gold medal – first place	2007 Moscow	Relay
Silver medal – second place	2002 Borovetz	Middle
Silver medal – second place	2005 Levi	Long
Bronze medal – third place	2000 Krasnoyarsk	Middle
Bronze medal – third place	2000 Krasnoyarsk	Long
Bronze medal – third place	2007 Moscow	Long

World Cup
Silver medal – second place	2000	Overall WC

Andrei Viktorovich Gruzdev (Russian: Андрей Викторович Груздев; born 21 May 1977 in Kineshma, RSFSR, Soviet Union) is a Russian ski-orienteering competitor and world champion.

== Ski orienteering ==
He received a gold medal in sprint at the 2002 World Ski Orienteering Championships in Borovetz, and a gold medal in the middle distance in Levi in 2005. In 2007 he won a gold medal in the relay event (with Kirill Veselov and Eduard Khrennikov). He has received two individual silver medal and three bronze medals at the world championships.

At the World Cup in Ski Orienteering in 2000 Gruzdev finished overall second, behind winner Eduard Khrennikov.
