= Jukka Lanki =

Finnish ski-orienteering competitor (born 1971)

Medal record

Representing Finland

Men's Ski-orienteering

World Championships
Silver medal – second place	2000 Krasnoyarsk	Long
Silver medal – second place	2000 Krasnoyarsk	Relay
Silver medal – second place	2002 Borovetz	Relay
Silver medal – second place	2005 Levi	Relay
Bronze medal – third place	1998 Windischgarsten	Relay
Bronze medal – third place	2004 Østersund	Relay
Bronze medal – third place	2005 Levi	Long

World Cup
Silver medal – second place	2001	Overall WC
Bronze medal – third place	2000	Overall WC

Jukka Lanki (born 11 June 1971) is a Finnish ski-orienteering competitor who has represented Finland internationally from 1996. He has achieved silver medals at the world championships, both individually and in the relay. In the World Cup his best overall result is finishing second in 2001, as well as several victories in individual races.

== World championships ==
Lanki received a silver medal in the long course at the 2000 World Ski Orienteering Championships in Krasnoyarsk, and a bronze medal in Levi in 2005.

He received silver or bronze medals with the Finnish relay team in 1998, 2000, 2002, 2004 and 2005, and finished 5th in the relay in 2007.

== World Cup ==
Lanki finished overall 6th in the World Cup in Ski Orienteering in 1999, overall third in 2000, overall second in 2001, and overall 5th in 2003.

== See also ==
- Finnish orienteers
- List of orienteers
- List of orienteering events
