= Marianne Bogestedt =

Swedish ski orienteer

Medal record

Representing Sweden

Women's ski orienteering

World Championships
Gold medal – first place	1977 Velingrad	Classic
Silver medal – second place	1977 Velingrad	Relay

Marianne Bogestedt is a Swedish ski-orienteering competitor and world champion. She won a gold medal in the classic distance at the World Ski Orienteering Championships in Velingrad in 1977, and received a silver medal with the Swedish relay team.
