= Matti Väisänen (ski-orienteer) =

Finnish ski-orienteering competitor (born 1948)

Medal record

Representing Finland

Men's Ski-orienteering

World Championships
| Silver medal – second place | 1980 Avesta | Relay |
| Bronze medal – third place | 1980 Avesta | Individual |

Matti Väisänen (born 23 September 1948) is a Finnish ski-orienteering competitor. He won a relay silver medal and an individual bronze medal at the 1980 World Ski Orienteering Championships.

== See also ==
- Finnish orienteers
- List of orienteers
- List of orienteering events
