= Helene Söderlund =

Swedish ski-orienteer

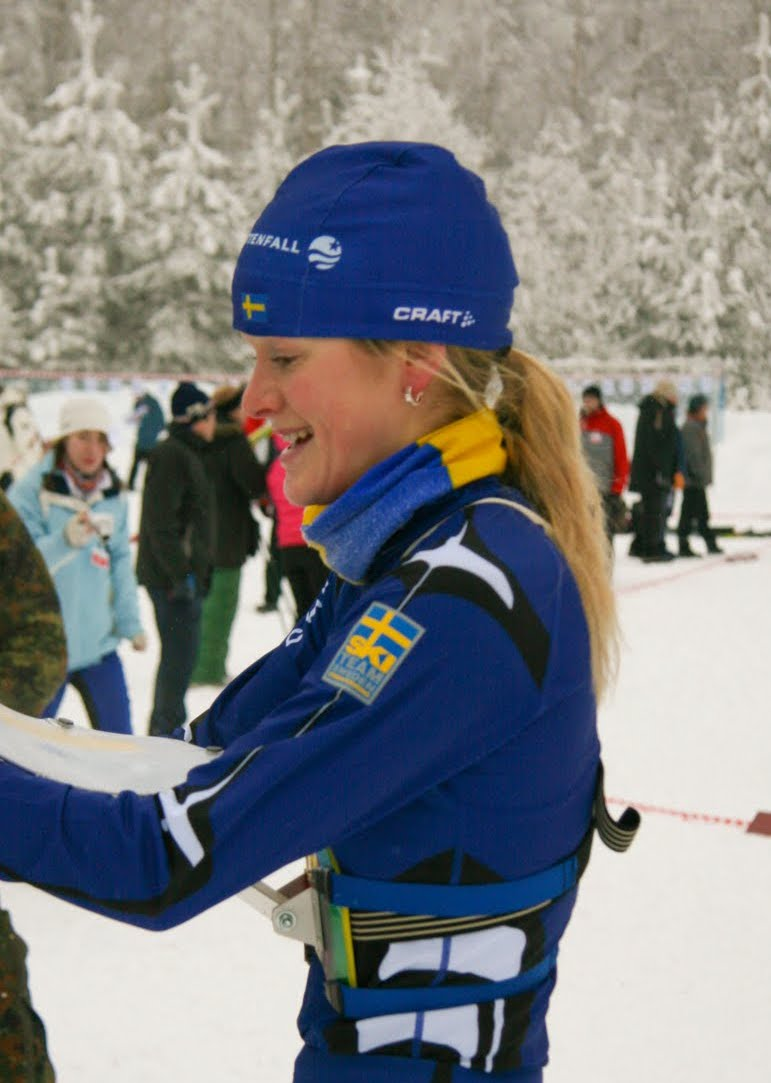

Medal record

Representing Sweden

Women's Ski-orienteering

World Championships
Gold medal – first place	2009 Rusutsu	Relay
Silver medal – second place	2009 Rusutsu	Middle
Silver medal – second place	2009 Rusutsu	Sprint
Bronze medal – third place	2009 Rusutsu	Long

Junior World Championships
Gold medal – first place	2007 Salzburg	Relay
Silver medal – second place	2007 Salzburg	Sprint
Silver medal – second place	2007 Salzburg	Long
Bronze medal – third place	2007 Salzburg	Middle

Helene Söderlund (born 9 May 1987) is a Swedish ski-orienteering competitor and World Champion. She won a gold medal in the relay at the 2009 World Ski Orienteering Championships, and medals in both the long, middle and sprint events.

At the Junior World Ski Orienteering Championships in Salzburg in 2007, she won a silver medal in the long distance, a bronze medal in the middle distance, a silver medal in the sprint, as well as being part of the Swedish winning team in the relay.
