= Natalia Tomilova =

Russian ski-orienteer

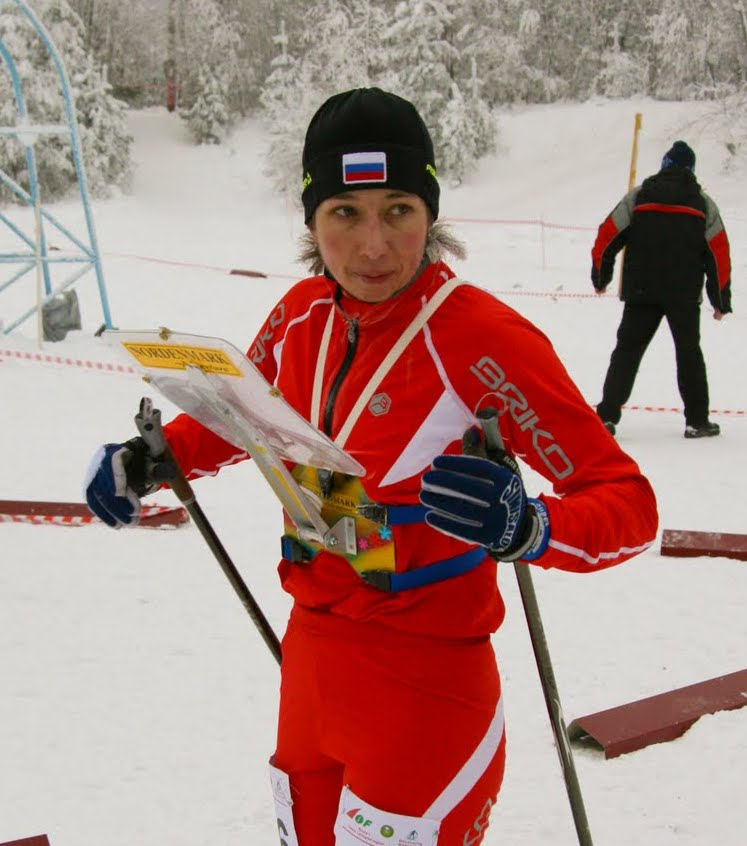

Medal record

Representing Russia

Women's Ski-orienteering

World Championships
Silver medal – second place	2005 Levi, Finland	Long
Bronze medal – third place	2004 Östersund	Long
Bronze medal – third place	2007 Moscow Region	Middle

World Cup
Gold medal – first place	2003	Overall WC

Natalia Tomilova (born October 10, 1977) is a Russian ski-orienteering competitor and winner of the overall world cup, who was suspended for two years for doping.

== Biography ==
She received a bronze medal in the long course at the 2004 World Ski Orienteering Championships in Östersund, a silver medal in 2005 in Levi, and a bronze medal in the middle distance in 2007 in Moscow Region. She won the overall World Cup in Ski Orienteering in 2003.

In 2013, she was suspended for 2 years for having used the banned Phenylpiracetam substance
