= Mirja Puhakka =

Finnish ski orienteer

Medal record

Representing Finland

Women's ski orienteering

World Championships
Gold medal – first place	1980 Avesta	Individual
Gold medal – first place	1980 Avesta	Relay
Gold medal – first place	1984 Lavarone	Individual
Silver medal – second place	1982 Aigen	Individual
Silver medal – second place	1982 Aigen	Relay
Silver medal – second place	1984 Lavarone	Relay

Mirja Puhakka (born 30 April 1955 in Sippola) is a Finnish ski-orienteering competitor and world champion. She received an individual gold medal at the World Ski Orienteering Championships in Avesta in 1980, and again in Lavarone in 1984. She won the relay event in the 1980 World Championships with the Finnish team, and received silver medals in 1982 and in 1984.

== See also ==
- Finnish orienteers
- List of orienteers
- List of orienteering events
