= Tatiana Vlasova =

Russian ski-orienteer

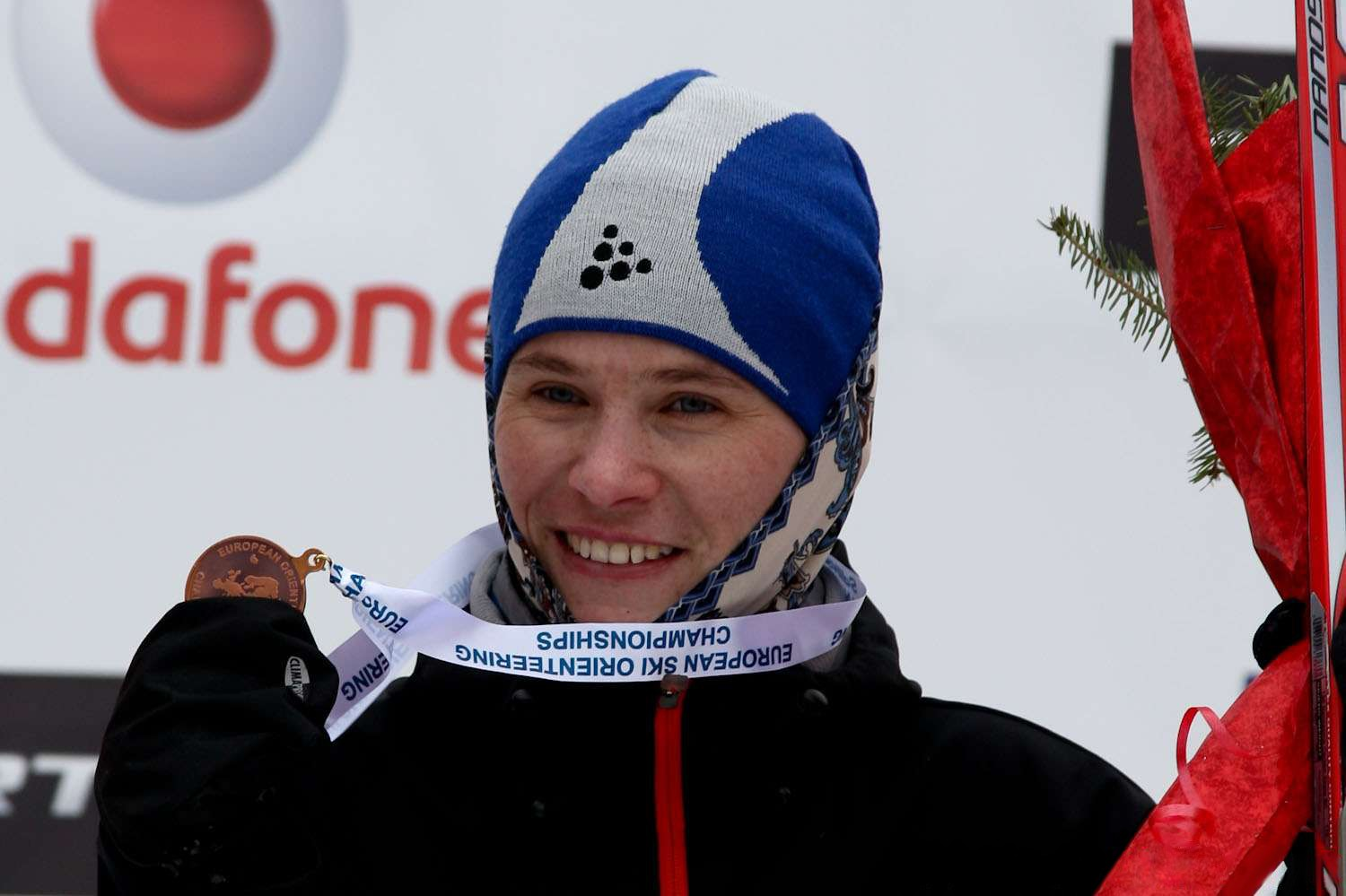

Medal record

Representing Russia

Women's Ski-orienteering

World Championships
Gold medal – first place	2000 Krasnoyarsk	Short
Gold medal – first place	2002 Borovets	Relay
Gold medal – first place	2004 Östersund	Sprint
Gold medal – first place	2005 Levi, Finland	Middle
Gold medal – first place	2005 Levi, Finland	Long
Gold medal – first place	2007 Moscow Region	Long
Gold medal – first place	2007 Moscow Region	Middle
Gold medal – first place	2007 Moscow Region	Sprint
Gold medal – first place	2007 Moscow Region	Relay
Gold medal – first place	2009 Rusutsu	Middle
Silver medal – second place	2004 Östersund	Relay
Silver medal – second place	2000 Krasnoyarsk	Relay
Silver medal – second place	2009 Rusutsu	Sprint
Bronze medal – third place	2002 Borovets	Sprint
Bronze medal – third place	2009 Rusutsu	Relay

World Cup
Gold medal – first place	2007-8	Overall WC
Silver medal – second place	2001	Overall WC
Silver medal – second place	2003	Overall WC
Silver medal – second place	2006	Overall WC

Tatiana Germanovna Vlasova (Russian: Татьяна Германовна Власова; born 21 May 1977) is a Russian ski-orienteering competitor and world champion. She received nine gold medals at the World Ski Orienteering Championships from 2000 to 2009. She won the overall World Cup in Ski Orienteering in 2007/8, and finished 2nd in 2001, 2003 and 2006.
