= Magdalena Olsson =

Swedish orienteer

Personal information
- Born: 1990 (age 35–36)

Sport
- Sport: Ski orienteering; Orienteering
- Club: IFK Mora OK
Medal record
Representing Sweden
Women's ski orienteering
World Championships
Silver medal – second place	2019 Piteå	Sprint
Silver medal – second place	2019 Piteå	Relay

Magdalena Olsson (born 1990) is a Swedish orienteering and ski orienteering competitor.

She won a silver medal in the sprint at the 2019 World Ski Orienteering Championships.
