= Salla Koskela =

Finnish ski orienteering competitor

Personal information
- Born: 7 May 1992 (age 34)

Sport
- Sport: Ski orienteering
- Club: Lounais Hameen Rasti
Medal record
Representing Finland
Women's ski orienteering
World Championships
Silver medal – second place	2017 Krasnoyarsk	Sprint
Silver medal – second place	2017 Krasnoyarsk	Middle

Salla Koskela (born 7 May 1992) is a Finnish ski orienteering competitor.

At the 2017 World Ski Orienteering Championships she won a silver medal in women's sprint, as well as in the middle distance.
