= Raino Pesu =

Finnish ski-orienteer (born 1972)

Medal record

Representing Finland

Men's Ski-orienteering

World Championships
Gold medal – first place	1998 Windischgarsten	Short
Bronze medal – third place	1996 Lillehammer	Short
Bronze medal – third place	2002 Borovetz	Long
Bronze medal – third place	2002 Borovetz	Sprint

World Cup
Gold medal – first place	1999	Overall WC
Silver medal – second place	1995	Overall WC

Raino Pesu (born 15 October 1972 in Joutseno) is a Finnish ski-orienteering competitor, world champion and winner of the overall world cup.

He received a gold medal in the short course at the 1998 World Ski Orienteering Championships in Windischgarsten.

He finished overall first in the World Cup in Ski Orienteering in 1999, and second in 1995.

== See also ==
- Finnish orienteers
- List of orienteers
- List of orienteering events
