= Milka Reponen =

Finnish ski orienteering competitor

Personal information
- Born: 31 March 1991 (age 35)

Sport
- Sport: Ski orienteering
- Club: Haapamäen Urheilijat
Medal record
Representing Finland
Women's ski orienteering
World Championships
| Gold medal – first place | 2015 Hamar / Løten | Middle |

Milka Reponen (born 31 March 1991) is a Finnish ski orienteering competitor.

She won a gold medal in the middle distance at the 2015 World Ski Orienteering Championships.
