= Vidar Benjaminsen =

Norwegian orienteer (born 1962)

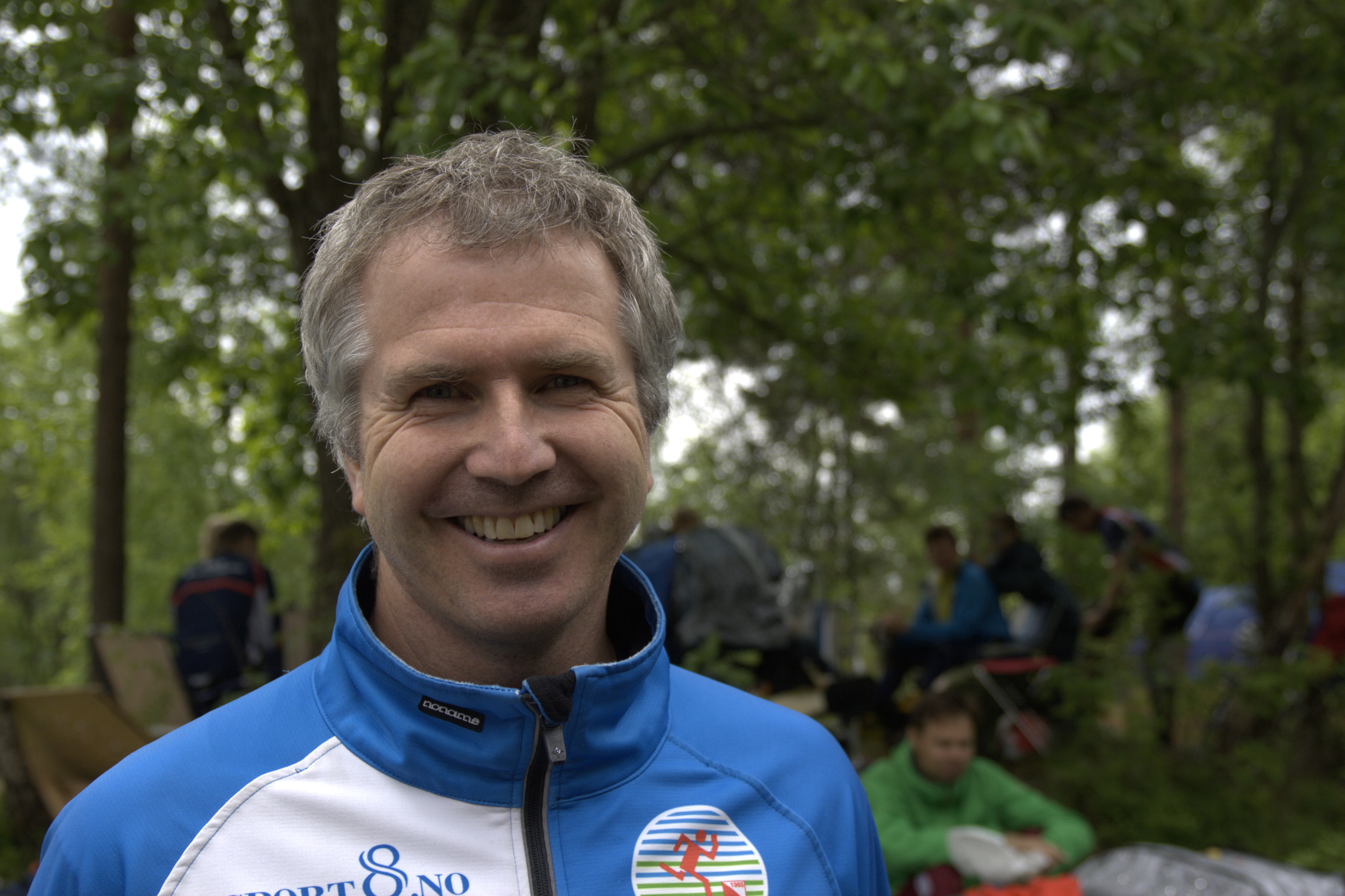

Personal information
- Born: 18 August 1962 (age 63)

Sport
- Sport: Ski orienteering
- Club: Lillomarka OL
Medal record
Representing Norway
Men's Ski-orienteering
World Championships
Gold medal – first place	1986 Batak	Relay
Gold medal – first place	1992 Pontarlier	Long
Gold medal – first place	1992 Pontarlier	Short
Gold medal – first place	1994 Val di Non	Relay
Silver medal – second place	1988 Kuopio	Short distance
Silver medal – second place	1990 Skellefteå	Short distance
Silver medal – second place	1996 Lillehammer	Long distance
Silver medal – second place	1996 Lillehammer	Short distance
Bronze medal – third place	1984 Lavarone	Relay
Bronze medal – third place	1988 Kuopio	Relay
Bronze medal – third place	1990 Skellefteå	Long distance
Bronze medal – third place	1990 Skellefteå	Relay
Bronze medal – third place	1992 Pontarlier	Relay
Bronze medal – third place	1994 Val di Non	Short
Bronze medal – third place	1996 Lillehammer	Relay
World Cup
Gold medal – first place	1989	Overall WC
Gold medal – first place	1993	Overall WC
Bronze medal – third place	1991	Overall WC
Bronze medal – third place	1995	Overall WC

Vidar Benjaminsen (born 18 August 1962) is a Norwegian ski-orienteering competitor and world champion. He has received four gold medals, four silver medals and seven bronze medals at the World Ski Orienteering Championships, from 1986 to 1996. He won the overall World Cup in Ski Orienteering in 1989 and 1993.

After retiring from elite ski-orienteering, he has been an active organizer of events as well as promoter of the sports of orienteering and ski-orienteering. In 2004, he was awarded a prize for his voluntary efforts by Oslo's regional sports administration.

His club is Lillomarka Orienteering Team. He has been an active member since its formation in 1985.

He is married to Anne Benjaminsen, and they are parents of Andrine Benjaminsen and Juni Marie Benjaminsen.
