= Stine Hjermstad Kirkevik =

Norwegian orienteer (born 1976)

Personal information
- Born: 24 January 1976 (age 50)

Sport
- Sport: Ski orienteering
- Club: Asker SK
Medal record
Representing Norway
Women's Ski-orienteering
World Championships
Gold medal – first place	2004 Østersund	Long
Gold medal – first place	2004 Østersund	Middle
Gold medal – first place	2005 Levi, Finland	Sprint
Gold medal – first place	2005 Levi, Finland	Relay
Bronze medal – third place	2004 Østersund	Sprint
Bronze medal – third place	2005 Levi, Finland	Middle
World Cup
Gold medal – first place	2006	Overall WC
Bronze medal – third place	2001	Overall WC

Stine Hjermstad Kirkevik (born 24 January 1976) is a Norwegian ski-orienteering competitor and world champion.

She won four gold medals at the World Ski Orienteering Championships, in 2004 and 2005. She won the overall World Cup in Ski Orienteering in 2006, and finished 3rd in 2001. She represented the club Asker SK.
