= Eduard Khrennikov =

Russian ski orienteer

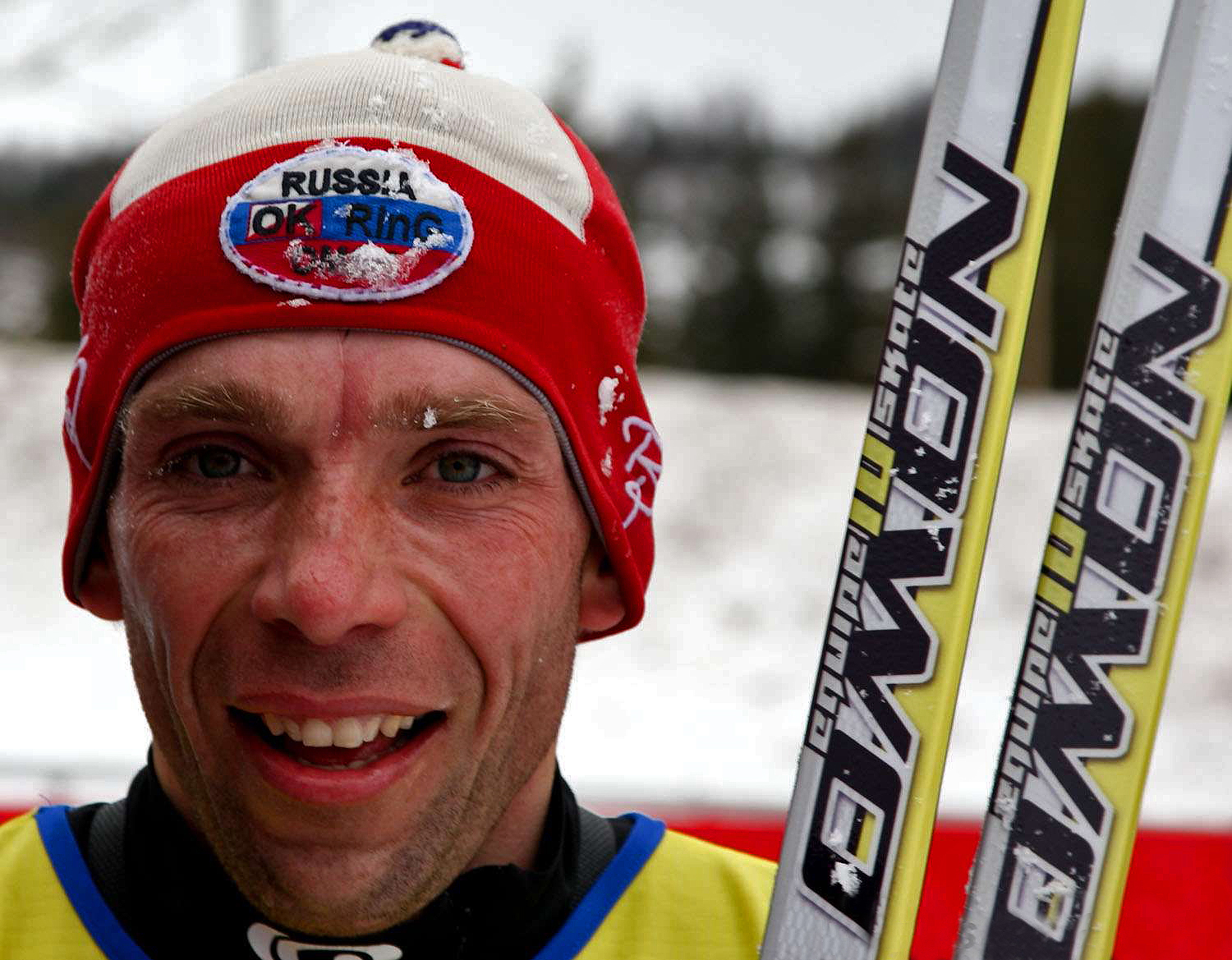

Medal record

Representing Russia

Men's Ski-orienteering

World Championships
Gold medal – first place	2002 Borovetz	Middle
Gold medal – first place	2004 Östersund	Long
Gold medal – first place	2004 Östersund	Sprint
Gold medal – first place	2005 Levi	Long
Gold medal – first place	2007 Moscow Region	Long
Gold medal – first place	2007 Moscow Region	Middle
Gold medal – first place	2007 Moscow Region	Sprint
Gold medal – first place	2015 Hamar / Løten	Relay
Silver medal – second place	2000 Krasnoyarsk	Short
Silver medal – second place	2002 Borovetz	Long
Silver medal – second place	2009 Rusutsu	Long
Bronze medal – third place	2019 Piteå	Sprint
Bronze medal – third place	2005 Levi	Middle

World Cup
Gold medal – first place	2000	Overall WC
Gold medal – first place	2003	Overall WC
Gold medal – first place	2006	Overall WC
Gold medal – first place	2010	Overall WC
Bronze medal – third place	2001	Overall WC

World Military Games
Gold medal – first place	2010 Aosta Valley	Middle
Gold medal – first place	2010 Aosta Valley	Team
Gold medal – first place	2013 Annecy	Middle
Gold medal – first place	2013 Annecy	Relay
Gold medal – first place	2017 Sochi	Middle
Gold medal – first place	2017 Sochi	Sprint
Gold medal – first place	2017 Sochi	Relay
Gold medal – first place	2017 Sochi	Team sprint

Eduard Alexandrovich Khrennikov (Russian: Эдуард Александрович Хренников; born 19 May 1973 in Usolye-Sibirskoye) is a Russian ski-orienteering competitor and world champion, and three times winner of the overall World cup. He received a gold medal in the long course at the 2004, 2005 and 2007 World Ski Orienteering Championships, in the middle distance in 2002 and 2007, and in sprint in 2004 and 2007. He won the overall World Cup in Ski Orienteering in 2000, 2003 and 2006, and finished 3rd in 2001. Khrennikov by winning the middle distance at the 2017 Winter Military World Games in Sochi, Russia won his fifth medal in this competition. He continued winning three more gold medals there.
