= World Ski Orienteering Championships =

Recurring international ski orienteering competitions

- Status: active
- Genre: sporting event
- Date: February–March
- Frequency: annual
- Location: various
- Inaugurated: 1975
- Organiser: International Orienteering Federation

The World Ski Orienteering Championships (WSOC) is the official event to award the titles of World Champions in ski orienteering. The World Championships is organized every odd year. The programme includes Sprint, Middle and Long Distance competitions, and a Relay for both men and women. The first WSOC was held in 1975.

== Host towns/cities ==
Number	Year	Date	Place
1	1975	26–28 February	Hyvinkää, Finland
2	1977	25–27 March	Velingrad, Bulgaria
3	1980	26 February – 1 March	Avesta, Sweden
4	1982	8–12 February	Aigen / Ennstal, Austria
5	1984	30 January – 4 February	Lavarone, Italy
6	1986	19–24 February	Batak, Bulgaria
7	1988	2–6 March	Kuopio, Finland
8	1990	1–4 March	Skellefteå, Sweden
9	1992	28 January – 2 February	Pontarlier, France
10	1994	1–5 February	Val di Non, Italy
11	1996	19–24 February	Lillehammer, Norway
12	1998	19–25 January	Windischgarsten, Austria
13	2000	28 February – 5 March	Krasnoyarsk, Russia
14	2002	23 February – 2 March	Borovetz, Bulgaria
15	2004	11–15 February	Åsarna / Östersund, Sweden
16	2005	5–12 March	Levi / Kittilä, Finland
17	2007	23 February – 3 March	Moscow Oblast, Russia
18	2009	3–8 March	Rusutsu, Japan
19	2011	20–28 March	Tänndalen, Sweden
20	2013	3–8 March	Ridder, Kazakhstan
21	2015	7–15 February	Hamar / Løten, Norway
22	2017	6–12 March	Krasnoyarsk, Russia
23	2019	19–24 March	Piteå, Sweden
24	2021	22–28 February	Kääriku, Estonia
25	2022	15–19 March	Kemi-Keminmaa, Finland
26	2024	23–27 January	Ramsau, Austria
27	2026	2 March – 6 March	Rusutsu, Japan

== Classic/Long ==
This event was called "Classic distance" from 1975 to 1986. Since 1988 it is called "Long distance".

=== Men's classic/long distance ===
Year	Gold	Silver	Bronze	Notes
1975	(Finland) Olavi Svanberg	(Finland) Jorma Karvonen	(Finland) Heimo Taskinen	23.4 km, 4 cp, 33 part.
1977	(Sweden) Örjan Svahn	(Finland) Pekka Pökälä	(Finland) Jorma Karvonen	22.0 km, 29 part.
1980	(Finland) Pertti Tikka	(Sweden) Jan-Erik Thorn	(Finland) Matti Väisänen	23.9 km, 9 cp, 38 part.
1982	(Finland) Olavi Svanberg	(Finland) Pertti Tikka	(Norway) Sigurd Dæhli	20.5 km, 12 cp, 61 part.
1984	(Finland) Anssi Juutilainen	(Sweden) Stefan Larsson	(Finland) Pertti Tikka	19.6 km, 10 cp, 64 part.
1986	(Sweden) Claes Berglund	(Finland) Anssi Juutilainen	(Finland) Hannu Koponen	19.1 km, 8 cp, 69 part.
1988	(Finland) Anssi Juutilainen	(Finland) Hannu Koponen	(Sweden) Anders Björkman	
1990	(Sweden) Anders Björkman	(Sweden) Stig Mattsson	(Norway) Vidar Benjaminsen	
1992	(Norway) Vidar Benjaminsen	(Finland) Vesa Mäkipää	(Russia) Ivan Kuzmin	25.0 km, 12 cp, 65 part.
1994	(Italy) Nicolo Corradini	(Norway) Lars Lystad	(Russia) Vladislav Kormtshikov	17.7 km, 14 cp, 60 part.
1996	(Italy) Nicolo Corradini	(Norway) Vidar Benjaminsen	(Sweden) Bertil Nordqvist	22.0 km, 25 cp, 78 part.
1998	(Russia) Viktor Korchagin	(Finland) Pekka Varis	(Italy) Nicolo Corradini	21.0 km, 16 cp, 79 part.
2000	(Russia) Vladislav Kormtshikov	(Finland) Jukka Lanki	(Russia) Andrei Gruzdev	64 participants
2002	(Finland) Matti Keskinarkaus	(Russia) Eduard Khrennikov	(Finland) Raino Pesu (Sweden) Bertil Nordqvist	19.85 km, 32 cp, 70 part.
2004	(Russia) Eduard Khrennikov	(Sweden) Tomas Löfgren	(Norway) Tommy Olsen	23.23 km, 28 cp, 63 part.
2005	(Russia) Eduard Khrennikov	(Russia) Andrei Gruzdev	(Finland) Jukka Lanki	25.5 km, 37 cp, 59 part.
2007	(Russia) Eduard Khrennikov	(Russia) Kirill Veselov	(Russia) Andrei Gruzdev	24.81 km, 48 cp, 69 part.
2009	(Russia) Andrei Lamov	(Russia) Eduard Khrennikov	(Finland) Olli-Markus Taivainen	
2011	(Russia) Andrey Grigoriev	(Finland) Staffan Tunis	(Russia) Vladimir Barchukov	
2013	(Sweden) Peter Arnesson	(Finland) Janne Häkkinen	(Finland) Staffan Tunis	
2015	(Norway) Lars Moholdt	(Russia) Andrey Lamov	(Finland) Staffan Tunis	
2017	(Sweden) Erik Rost	(Russia) Kirill Veselov	(Norway) Lars Moholdt	8.2 km, 48 participants
2019	(Russia) Andrey Lamov	(Norway) Lars Moholdt	(Finland) Tero Linnainmaa	

=== Women's classic/long distance ===
Year	Gold	Silver	Bronze	Notes
1975	(Finland) Sinikka Kukkonen	(Sweden) Agneta Mansson	(Sweden) Lena Samuelsson	13.8 km, 2 cp, 16 participants
1977	(Sweden) Marianne Bogestedt	(Sweden) Sonja Johannesson	(Finland) Sinikka Kukkonen	13.0 km, 18 participants
1980	(Finland) Mirja Puhakka	(Finland) Kaija Silvennoinen	(Sweden) Ann Larsson	15.6 km, 9 cp, 22 part.
1982	(Sweden) Arja Hannus	(Finland) Mirja Puhakka	(Finland) Sirpa Kukkonen	13.0 km, 8 cp, 41 part.
1984	(Finland) Mirja Puhakka	(Sweden) Lena Isaksson	(Sweden) Ann Larsson	14.2 km, 5 cp, 46 part.
1986	(Norway) Ragnhild Bratberg	(Sweden) Arja Hannus	(Finland) Virpi Juutilainen	12.6 km, 5 cp, 45 part.
1988	(Finland) Virpi Juutilainen	(Norway) Ragnhild Bratberg	(Finland) Sirpa Kukkonen	12.1 km, 6 cp, 36 part.
1990	(Norway) Ragnhild Bratberg	(Sweden) Arja Hannus	(Sweden) Annika Zell	18.95 km, 9 cp, 34 part.
1992	(Sweden) Annika Zell	(Finland) Mirja Ojanen	(Sweden) Arja Hannus	13.0 km, 8 cp, 53 part.
1994	(Bulgaria) Pepa Milusheva	(Finland) Virpi Juutilainen	(Estonia) Maret Vaher	13.0 km, 13 cp, 54 part.
1996	(Sweden) Annika Zell	(Norway) Hilde G.Pedersen	(Finland) Arja Nuolioja	14.0 km, 18 cp, 51 part.
1998	(Finland) Liisa Anttila	(Sweden) Annika Zell	(Sweden) Lena Hasselstrom	15.6 km, 18 cp, 61 part.
2000	(Sweden) Arja Hannus	(Finland) Liisa Anttila	(Finland) Hanna Kosonen	34 participants
2002	(Sweden) Lena Hasselstrom	(Finland) Erja Jokinen	(Finland) Mervi Väisänen	13.7 km, 22 cp, 41 part.
2004	(Norway) Stine Hjermstad Kirkevik	(Finland) Hannele Valkonen	(Russia) Natalia Tomilova	15.94 km, 22 cp, 43 part.
2005	(Russia) Tatiana Vlasova	(Russia) Natalia Tomilova	(Russia) Olga Shevchenko	18.1 km, 26 cp, 43 part.
2007	(Russia) Tatiana Vlasova	(Finland) Hannele Valkonen	(Norway) Marte Reenaas	13.91 km, 31 cp, 49 part.
2009	(Russia) Anastasia Kravchenko	(Czech Republic) Barbora Chudíková	(Sweden) Helene Söderlund	
2011	(Sweden) Helene Söderlund	(Russia) Tatiana Kozlova	(Norway) Marte Reenaas	
2013	(Finland) Mervi Pesu	(Russia) Tatiana Kozlova	(Sweden) Tove Alexandersson (Sweden) Josefine Engström	
2015	(Sweden) Josefine Engström	(Finland) Mira Kaskinen	(Russia) Kseniya Tretyakova	
2017	(Russia) Maria Kechkina	(Russia) Alena Trapeznikova	(Russia) Polina Frolova	7.3 km, 30 participants
2019	(Sweden) Tove Alexandersson	(Russia) Alena Trapeznikova	(Russia) Maria Kechkina	

== Short/Middle ==
This event was called "Short distance" from 1988 to 2000. Since 2002 it is called "Middle distance".

=== Men's short/middle distance ===
Year	Gold	Silver	Bronze	Notes
1988	(Finland) Hannu Koponen	(Norway) Vidar Benjaminsen	(Finland) Anssi Juutilainen	9.2 km, 11 cp, 63 participants
1990	(Finland) Anssi Juutilainen	(Norway) Vidar Benjaminsen	(Sweden) Anders Björkman	12.31 km, 9 cp, 60 participants
1992	(Norway) Vidar Benjaminsen	(Finland) Vesa Mäkipää	(Russia) Ivan Kuzmin	10.0 km, 12 cp, 65 participants
1994	(Italy) Nicolo Corradini (Russia) Ivan Kuzmin		(Norway) Vidar Benjaminsen	7.7 km, 12 cp, 61 participants
1996	(Sweden) Bjorn Lans	(Norway) Vidar Benjaminsen	(Finland) Raino Pesu	8.0 km, 14 cp, 78 participants
1998	(Finland) Raino Pesu	(Lithuania) Nerijus Šulčys	(Norway) Kjetil Ulven	10.8 km, 23 cp, 73 participants
2000	(Italy) Nicolo Corradini	(Russia) Eduard Khrennikov	(Russia) Andrei Gruzdev	64 participants
2002	(Russia) Eduard Khrennikov	(Russia) Andrei Gruzdev	(Norway) Kjetil Ulven	11.2 km, 64 participants
2004	(Sweden) Tomas Löfgren	(Norway) Tommy Olsen	(Finland) Arto Lilja	12.38 km, 36 cp, 68 participants
2005	(Russia) Ruslan Gritsan (Russia) Andrei Gruzdev		(Russia) Eduard Khrennikov	12.7 km, 21 cp, 63 participants
2007	(Russia) Eduard Khrennikov	(Finland) Staffan Tunis	(Russia) Kirill Veselov	11.48 km, 29 cp, 71 participants
2009	(Finland) Olli-Markus Taivainen	(Finland) Staffan Tunis	(Finland) Matti Keskinarkaus	
2011	(Finland) Staffan Tunis	(Russia) Andrei Lamov	(Sweden) Peter Arnesson	
2013	(Sweden) Peter Arnesson	(Russia) Andrei Lamov	(Russia) Kiril Veselov	
2015	(Finland) Staffan Tunis	(Bulgaria) Stanimir Belomazhev	(Norway) Lars Moholdt	
2017	(Bulgaria) Stanimir Belomazhev	(Sweden) Erik Rost	(Norway) Lars Moholdt	3.4 km, 53 participants
2019	(Sweden) Erik Rost	(Norway) Audun Heimdal	(Switzerland) Gion Schnyder	

=== Women's short/middle distance ===
Year	Gold	Silver	Bronze	Notes
1988	(Norway) Ragnhild Bratberg	(Finland) Virpi Juutilainen	(Finland) Sirpa Kukkonen	6.7 km, 8 cp, 35 participants
1990	(Norway) Ragnhild Bratberg	(Finland) Virpi Juutilainen	(Sweden) Arja Hannus	9.23 km, 9 cp, 34 participants
1992	(Sweden) Arja Hannus	(Finland) Virpi Juutilainen	(Sweden) Annika Zell	7.0 km, 10 cp, 53 participants
1994	(Finland) Virpi Juutilainen	(Finland) Sanna Savolainen (Norway) Hilde G. Pedersen		5.5 km, 9 cp, 55 participants
1996	(Finland) Arja Nuolioja	(Sweden) Annika Zell	(Russia) Svetlana Haustova	6.0 km, 12 cp, 53 participants
1998	(Sweden) Annika Zell	(Sweden) Lena Hasselstrom	(Finland) Liisa Anttila	8.6 km, 23 cp, 64 participants
2000	(Russia) Tatiana Vlasova	(Sweden) Lena Hasselstrom	(Finland) Liisa Anttila	32 participants
2002	(Sweden) Stina Grenholm	(Finland) Erja Jokinen	(Sweden) Lena Hasselstrom	8.4 km, 42 participants
2004	(Norway) Stine Hjermstad Kirkevik	(Sweden) Marie Lund	(Sweden) Stina Grenholm	9.03 km, 27 cp, 46 participants
2005	(Russia) Tatiana Vlasova	(Finland) Erja Jokinen	(Sweden) Stina Grenholm	10.1 km, 17 cp, 44 participants
2007	(Russia) Tatiana Vlasova	(Finland) Liisa Anttila	(Russia) Natalia Tomilova	7.45 km, 20 cp, 49 participants
2009	(Russia) Tatiana Vlasova	(Sweden) Helene Söderlund	(Sweden) Josefine Engström	
2011	(Russia) Polina Malchikova	(Russia) Alena Trapeznikova	(Norway) Stine Olsen Kirkevik	
2013	(Russia) Anastasia Kravchenko	(Russia) Tatiana Kozlova	(Sweden) Josefine Engström	
2015	(Finland) Milka Reponen	(Finland) Marjut Turunen	(Finland) Mervi Pesu	
2017	(Sweden) Tove Alexandersson	(Russia) Polina Frolova	(Finland) Salla Koskela	7.3 km, 32 participants
2019	(Russia) Maria Kechkina	(Sweden) Tove Alexandersson	(Russia) Alena Trapeznikova	

== Sprint ==
This event was first held in 2002.

=== Men's sprint ===
Year	Gold	Silver	Bronze	Notes
2002	(Russia) Andrei Gruzdev	(Russia) Viktor Korchagin	(Finland) Raino Pesu	4.2 km, 11 cp, 66 participants
2004	(Russia) Eduard Khrennikov	(Sweden) Bengt Leandersson	(Sweden) Peter Arnesson	3.96 km, 21 cp, 73 participants
2005	(Finland) Matti Keskinarkaus	(Sweden) Bertil Nordqvist	(Sweden) Tobias Aslund	3.9 km, 10 cp, 63 participants
2007	(Russia) Eduard Khrennikov	(Russia) Vadim Tolstopyatov	(Finland) Staffan Tunis	3.84 km, 16 cp, 70 participants
2009	(Russia) Andrei Lamov	(Finland) Olli-Markus Taivainen	(Finland) Staffan Tunis	
2011	(Finland) Olli-Markus Taivainen	(Finland) Staffan Tunis	(Sweden) Peter Arnesson	
2013	(Sweden) Peter Arnesson	(Russia) Andrei Lamov	(Russia) Kirill Veselov	
2015	(Russia) Andrey Lamov	(Bulgaria) Stanimir Belomazhev	(Sweden) Erik Rost	
2017	(Sweden) Ulrik Nordberg	(Russia) Andrey Lamov	(Russia) Sergey Gorlanov	3.4 km, 55 participants
2019	(Russia) Sergei Gorlanov	(Sweden) Erik Rost	(Russia) Eduard Khrennikov	

=== Women's sprint ===
Year	Gold	Silver	Bronze	Notes
2002	(Sweden) Lena Hasselstrom	(Finland) Erja Jokinen	(Russia) Tatiana Vlasova	3.3 km, 8 cp, 41 participants
2004	(Russia) Tatiana Vlasova	(Finland) Liisa Anttila	(Norway) Stine Hjermstad Kirkevik	3.48 km, 19 cp, 48 participants
2005	(Norway) Stine Hjermstad Kirkevik	(Finland) Erja Jokinen	(Finland) Katja Rajaniemi	3.6 km, 10 cp, 44 participants
2007	(Russia) Tatiana Vlasova	(Russia) Olga Novikova	(Finland) Liisa Anttila (Russia) Tatiana Kozlova	2.79 km, 14 cp, 48 participants
2009	(Finland) Hannele Tonna	(Sweden) Helene Söderlund	(Russia) Tatiana Vlasova	
2011	(Sweden) Tove Alexandersson	(Sweden) Helene Söderlund	(Finland) Liisa Anttila	
2013	(Sweden) Tove Alexandersson	(Finland) Mervi Pesu	(Russia) Tatyana Kozlova	
2015	(Sweden) Tove Alexandersson	(Norway) Audhild Bakken Rognstad	(Sweden) Josefine Engström	
2017	(Sweden) Tove Alexandersson	(Russia) Polina Frolova	(Finland) Salla Koskela	3.1 km, 32 participants
2019	(Sweden) Tove Alexandersson	(Sweden) Magdalena Olsson	(Russia) Maria Kechkina	

== Relay ==
=== Men's relay ===
Year	Gold	Silver	Bronze	Notes
1975	Finland	Sweden	Switzerland	
1977	Sweden	Bulgaria	Czechoslovakia	
1980	Sweden	Finland	Bulgaria	
1982	Sweden	Norway	Finland	
1984	Sweden	Finland	Norway	
1986	Norway	Bulgaria	Finland	
1988	Finland	Sweden	Norway	
1990	Sweden	Finland	Norway	
1992	Finland	Russia	Norway	
1994	Norway	Finland	Russia	
1996	Sweden; Pär-Ove Bergqvist; Bertil Nordqvist; Björn Lans	Finland	Norway	
1998	Russia	Sweden	Finland	
2000	Russia	Finland	Sweden	
2002	Russia	Finland	Sweden	
2004	Russia	Norway	Finland	
2005	Russia	Finland	Sweden	
2007	Russia	Sweden	Switzerland	
2009	Finland	Russia	Sweden	
2011	Finland; Olli Markus Taivainen; Matti Keskinarkaus; Staffan Tunis	Sweden; Johan Granath; Erik Rost; Peter Arnesson	Norway; Eivind Tonna; Hans Jörgen Kvåle; Lars Hol Moholdt	
2013	Russia; Andrey Grigoriev; Kiril Veselov; Andrei Lamov	Sweden; Johan Granath; Martin Hammarberg; Peter Arnesson	Finland; Ville-Petteri Saarela; Hannu-Pekka Pukema; Staffan Tunis	
2015	Russia; Kiril Veselov; Eduard Khrennikov; Andrei Lamov	Sweden; Peter Arnesson; Erik Rost; Andreas Holmberg	Czech Republic; Jakub Skoda; Radek Laciga; Jiří Bouchal	
2017	Russia; Andrey Grigoriev; Kirill Veselov; Andrey Lamov	Sweden; Martin Hammarberg; Ulrik Nordberg; Erik Rost	Finland; Tero Linnainmaa; Juri Uusitalo; Ville Petteri Saarela	6.7 km, 16 controls, 14 countries
2019	Russia; Vladislav Kiselev; Sergei Gorlanov; Andrey Lamov	Sweden; Markus Lundholm; Martin Hammarberg; Erik Rost	Norway; Bjørnar Kvale; Audun Heimdal; Lars Moholdt	

=== Women's relay ===
Year	Gold	Silver	Bronze	Notes
1975	Finland	Sweden	Great Britain; Patricia Murphy; Francis Murray; Isobel Inglis	
1977	Finland	Sweden	Czechoslovakia	
1980	Finland	Sweden	Czechoslovakia	
1982	Sweden	Finland	Norway	
1984	Sweden	Finland	Bulgaria	
1986	Norway	Sweden	Bulgaria	
1988	Finland	Norway	Sweden	
1990	Finland	Sweden	Norway	
1992	Sweden	Finland	Norway	
1994	Sweden	Norway	Finland	
1996	Sweden	Russia	Finland	
1998	Finland	Sweden	Norway	
2000	Finland	Sweden	Russia	
2002	Russia	Sweden	Finland	
2004	Finland	Russia	Sweden	
2005	Norway	Sweden	Finland	
2007	Russia	Finland	Sweden	
2009	Sweden	Russia	Czech Republic	
2011	Russia; Alena Trapeznikova; Tatyana Kozlova; Polina Malchikova	Norway; Barbro Kvåle; Stine Olsen Kirkevik; Marte Reenas	Finland; Marjul Turunen; Liisa Anttila; Hannele Tonna	
2013	Russia; Anastasia Kravchenko; Yuliya Tarasenko; Tatyana Kozlova	Sweden; Magdalena Olsson; Josefine Engström; Tove Alexandersson	Finland; Milka Leppäsalm; Marjut Turunen; Mervi Pesu	
2015	Sweden; Frida Sandberg; Tove Alexandersson; Josefine Engström	Finland; Milka Reponen; Mira Kaskinen; Mervi Pesu	Russia; Kseniya Tretyakova; Tatiana Oborina; Yuliya Tarasenko	
2017	Russia; Maria Kechkina; Polina Frolova; Alena Trapeznikova	Finland; Mirka Suutari; Marjut Turunen; Salla Koskela	Czech Republic; Petra Hancova; Kristina Kolinova; Hanna Hancikova	5.6 km, 13 controls, 5 countries
2019	Russia; Alena Trapeznikova; Tatjana Oborina; Maria Kechkina	Sweden; Linda Lindkvist; Magdalena Olsson; Tove Alexandersson	Finland; Mirka Suutari; Milka Reponen; Salla Koskela	

== Mixed Sprint Relay ==
This event was first held in 2011.

Year	Gold	Silver	Bronze	Notes
2011	Russia; Andrey Grigoriev; Polina Malchikova	Sweden; Peter Arnesson; Helene Söderlund	Finland; Matti Keskinarkaus; Liisa Anttila	
2013	Sweden; Tove Alexandersson; Peter Arnesson	Finland; Mervi Pesu; Staffan Tunis	Bulgaria; Antoniya Grigorova; Stanimir Belomazhev	
2015	Russia; Yuliya Tarasenko; Andrey Lamov	Finland; Mira Kaskinen; Staffan Tunis	Sweden; Josefine Engström; Erik Rost	
2017	Sweden; Tove Alexandersson; Erik Rost	Russia; Polina Frolova; Andrey Lamov	Finland; Salla Koskela; Ville Petteri Saarela	

== 2017 redistribution of medals ==
In July 2017 it was announced that the IOF Council had decided to redistribute the medals for 2017, following the disqualification of Polina Frolova's results from the World Ski Orienteering Championships 2017 due to violation of anti-doping rules.

== All-time medal table ==
(Updated after 2019 competition)

Rank	Nation	Gold	Silver	Bronze	Total
1	Russia	50	30	29	109
2	Sweden	45	44	34	123
3	Finland	37	52	49	138
4	Norway	14	17	24	55
5	Italy	4	0	1	5
6	Bulgaria	2	4	4	10
7	Czech Republic	0	1	3	4
8	Lithuania	0	1	0	1
9	Czechoslovakia	0	0	3	3
9	Switzerland	0	0	3	3
11	Estonia	0	0	1	1
11	Great Britain	0	0	1	1
Totals (12 entries)		152	149	152	453

== See also ==
- Ski Orienteering
- World Cup in Ski Orienteering
- Junior World Ski Orienteering Championships

== External links and references ==
- World Ski Orienteering History
- IOF International Orienteering Federation
- World Ski Orienteering Championships 2009
