= List of orienteers =

This is a list of all orienteering competitors found in Wikipedia and notable within the orienteering sport.

== A ==
- Alida Abola, Soviet Union
- Christian Aebersold, Switzerland
- Gunborg Ahling, Sweden
- Katarina Allberg, Sweden
- Johanna Allston, Australia
- Maja Alm, Denmark
- Dainora Alšauskaitė, Lithuania
- Svajūnas Ambrazas, Lithuania
- Marianne Andersen, Norway
- Ragnhild Bente Andersen, Norway
- David Andersson, Sweden
- Monica Andersson, Sweden
- Ari Anjala, Finland
- Topi Anjala, Finland
- Liisa Anttila, Finland
- Linda Antonsen, Norway
- Karolina Arewång-Höjsgaard, Sweden
- Heidi Arnesen, Norway
- Peter Arnesson, Sweden
- Johanna Asklöf, Finland
- Anna-Lena Axelsson, Sweden

== B ==
- Martin Bagness, United Kingdom
- Hana Bajtošova, Slovakia
- Yvette Baker, United Kingdom, won World Orienteering Championships short distance 1999 in Inverness
- Ruth Baumberger, Switzerland
- Eugenia Belova, Russia
- Jan Beneš, Czech Republic, became Junior World Champion in the middle distance in Druskininkai in 2006
- Anne Benjaminsen, Finland
- Vidar Benjaminsen, Norway
- Stig Berge, Norway
- Alain Berger, Switzerland
- Morten Berglia, Norway
- Claes Berglund, Sweden
- Annika Billstam, Sweden
- Hanne Birke, Denmark
- Jimmy Birklin, Sweden, winner of the 2001 Sprint World Orienteering Championships
- Betty Ann Bjerkreim Nilsen, Norway
- Sture Björk, Sweden
- Anders Björkman, Sweden
- Ida Marie Bjørgul, Norway, received a silver medal in the middle distance at the 2007 Junior World Orienteering Championships in Dubbo, Australia
- Kjetil Bjørlo, Norway
- Bernt Bjørnsgaard, Norway
- Carl Henrik Bjørseth, Norway
- Claus Bloch, Denmark
- Grant Bluett, Australia
- Christina Blomqvist, Sweden
- Sören Bobach, Denmark
- Marianne Bogestedt, Sweden
- Anna Bogren, Sweden, won the 1993 short distance World Orienteering Championships
- Stefan Bolliger, Switzerland
- Chris Bonington, United Kingdom
- Katarina Borg, Sweden
- Outi Borgenström-Anjala, Finland
- Zoltán Boros, Hungary
- Kirsi Boström, Finland
- Mårten Boström, Finland
- Mikael Boström, Finland
- Irene Bucher, Switzerland
- Thomas Bührer, Switzerland
- Chris Brasher, United Kingdom
- Ragnhild Bratberg, Norway
- Dana Brožková, Czech Republic
- Radka Brožková, Czech Republic
- Lucie Böhm, Austria

== C ==
- Astrid Carlson, Norway, relay silver at the 1979 World Orienteering Championships
- Lennart Carlström, Sweden
- Sten-Olof Carlström, Sweden
- Adam Chromý, Czech Republic
- Ksenia Chernykh, Russia, individual gold medals at the 2007 and 2008 World MTB Orienteering Championships
- Barbora Chudíková, Czech Republic
- Jana Cieslarová, Czech Republic
- Nicolo Corradini, Italy
- Laure Coupat, France
- Kristin Cullman, Sweden
- Alicia Cobo, Spain, finalist in World Orienteering Championships in Finland 2013

== D ==
- Kalle Dalin, Sweden
- Luca Dallavalle, Italy
- Kristin Danielsen, Norway
- Anke Dannowski, Germany
- Marian Davidik, Slovakia
- Sergey Detkov, Russia
- Troy de Haas, Australia
- Tomáš Dlabaja, Czech Republic
- Jon Duncan, United Kingdom
- Magne Dæhli, Norway
- Sigurd Dæhli, Norway

== E ==
- Elise Egseth, Norway
- Roman Efimov, Russia
- Anne Berit Eid, Norway
- Silje Ekroll Jahren, Norway
- Lena Eliasson, Sweden
- Babben Enger-Damon, Norway
- Bo Engdahl, Sweden
- Emma Engstrand, Sweden
- Josefine Engström, Sweden
- Håkan Eriksson, Sweden

== F ==
- Beata Falk, Sweden
- Mari Fasting, Norway
- Zsuzsa Fey, Romania
- Mette Filskov, Denmark
- Jan Fjærestad, Norway
- Urs Flühmann, Switzerland
- Aila Flöjt, Finland
- Ivar Formo, Norway
- Petri Forsman, Finland
- Per Fosser, Norway
- Torunn Fossli Sæthre, Norway
- Jon Fossum, Norway
- Martin Fredholm, Sweden
- Hanni Fries, Switzerland
- Bernt Frilén, Sweden
- Martina Fritschy, Switzerland
- Tero Föhr, Finland

== G ==
- Alain Gafner, Switzerland
- Svatoslav Galík, Czechoslovakia
- Jana Galíková, Czech Republic
- Torbjørn Gasbjerg, Denmark
- Emy Gauffin, Sweden
- Michaela Gigon, Austria
- François Gonon, France
- Anna Górnicka-Antonowicz, Poland
- Anette Granstedt, Sweden
- Kerstin Granstedt, Sweden
- Stina Grenholm, Sweden
- Graham Gristwood, United Kingdom
- Ruslan Gritsan, Russia
- Andrei Gruzdev, Russia
- Thierry Gueorgiou, France
- Linnea Gustafsson, Sweden
- Maria Gustafsson, Sweden
- Anders Gärderud, Sweden

== H ==
- Paula Haapakoski, Finland
- Troy de Haas, Australia
- Ingrid Hadler, Norway
- Åge Hadler, Norway
- Kerstin Haglund, Sweden
- Mats Haldin, Finland
- Steven Hale, United Kingdom
- Øystein Halvorsen, Norway
- Arja Hannus, Sweden
- Astrid Hansen, Norway
- Atle Hansen, Norway
- Dorthe Hansen, Denmark
- Anna Hanzlová, Czechoslovakia
- Lena Hasselström, Sweden
- Anders Hauge, Norway
- Svetlana Haustova, Russia
- Anne Margrethe Hausken, Norway
- Ágnes Hegedűs, Hungary
- András Hegedus, Hungary
- Fabian Hertner, Switzerland
- Stine Hjermstad Kirkevik, Norway
- Lars Holmqvist, Sweden
- Bodil Holmström, Finland
- Mária Honzová, Czech Republic
- Michal Horáček, Czech Republic
- Magda Horváth, Hungary
- Holger Hott, Norway
- Sandy Hott, Canada
- Daniel Hotz, Switzerland
- Raila Hovi, Finland
- Tuula Hovi, Finland
- Martin Howald, Switzerland
- Daniel Hubmann, Switzerland
- Dieter Hulliger, Switzerland
- Dominik Humbel, Switzerland
- Ruth Humbel, Switzerland
- Jarkko Huovila, Finland
- Birgitte Husebye, Norway

== I ==
- Pasi Ikonen, Finland
- Ulf Forseth Indgaard, Norway
- Joakim Ingelsson, Sweden
- Elisabeth Ingvaldsen, Norway
- Lena Isaksson, Sweden
- Peter Ivars, Finland
- Johan Ivarsson, Sweden
- Egil Iversen, Norway

== J ==
- Adrian Jackson, Australia
- Svein Jacobsen, Norway
- Wenche Jacobsen, Norway
- Helena Jansson, Sweden
- Marlena Jansson, Sweden
- Jaroslav Jašek, Czechoslovakia
- Michal Jedlička, Czech Republic
- Karin Jexner, Denmark
- Sonja Johannesson, Sweden
- Egil Johansen, Norway, Sweden
- Helle Johansen, Norway
- Arne Johansson, Sweden
- Birgitta Johansson, Sweden
- Erik Johansson, Sweden
- Jenny Johansson, Sweden
- Karl Johansson, Sweden
- Martin Johansson (born 1984), Sweden
- Martin Johansson (born 1964), Sweden
- Sofie Johansson, Sweden
- Karl John, Switzerland
- Erja Jokinen, Finland
- Heli Jukkola, Finland
- Niclas Jonasson, Sweden
- Anssi Juutilainen, Finland
- Virpi Juutilainen, Finland
- Carsten Jørgensen, Denmark

== K ==
- Carl Waaler Kaas, Norway
- Simona Karochová, Czech Republic
- Timo Karppinen, Finland
- Jorma Karvonen, Finland
- Ari Kattainen, Finland
- Minna Kauppi, Finland
- Raila Kerkelä, Finland
- Mattias Karlsson, Sweden
- Matti Keskinarkaus, Finland
- Seppo Keskinarkaus, Finland
- Ernst Killander, Sweden
- Björn Kjellström, Sweden
- Jan Kjellström, Sweden
- Andrey Khramov, Russia
- Eduard Khrennikov, Russia
- Emma Klingenberg, Denmark
- Signe Klinting, Denmark
- Štěpán Kodeda, Czech Republic
- Erkki Kohvakka, Finland
- Reeta-Mari Kolkkala, Finland
- Hannu Koponen, Finland
- Viktor Korchagin, Russia
- Vladislav Kormtshikov, Russia
- Natalia Korzhova, Russia
- Rolf Koskinen, Finland
- Eija Koskivaara, Finland
- Hanna Kosonen, Finland
- Annariitta Kottonen, Finland
- Hannu Kottonen, Finland
- Magdolna Kovács, Hungary
- Petr Kozák, Czech Republic
- Tatiana Kozlova, Russia
- Anastasia Kravchenko, Russia
- Annichen Kringstad, Sweden
- Ragnhild Kristensen, Norway
- Øystein Kristiansen, Norway
- Per Kristiansen, Norway
- Vojtěch Král, Czech Republic
- Simonas Krėpšta, Lithuania
- Marcela Kubatková, Czech Republic
- Ada Kuchařová, Czech Republic
- Mika Kuisma, Finland
- Urho Kujala, Finland
- Sinikka Kukkonen, Finland
- Sirpa Kukkonen, Finland
- Ivan Kuzmin, Russia
- Olle Kärner, Estonia
- Vroni König-Salmi, Switzerland

== L ==
- Jani Lakanen, Finland
- Andrey Lamov, Russia
- Jukka Lanki, Finland
- Björn Lans, Sweden
- Jan Martin Larsen, Norway
- Ann Larsson, Sweden
- Birgitta Larsson, Sweden
- Marc Lauenstein, Switzerland
- Kjell Lauri, Sweden
- Alice Leake, United Kingdom
- Bengt Leandersson, Sweden
- Bengt Levin, Sweden
- Arto Lilja, Finland
- Katri Lindeqvist, Finland
- Ulla Lindkvist, Sweden
- Pete Livesey, United Kingdom
- Petr Losman, Czech Republic
- Vladimír Lučan, Czech Republic
- Marie Lund, Sweden
- Olav Lundanes, Norway
- Anne Lundmark, Sweden
- Susanne Lüscher, Switzerland
- Lars Lystad, Norway
- Magne Lystad, Norway
- Tomas Löfgren, Sweden
- Barbro Lönnkvist, Sweden
- Jenny Lönnkvist, Sweden
- Lars Lönnkvist, Sweden
- Fredrik Löwegren, Sweden
- Niklas Löwegren, Sweden

== M ==
- Valborg Madslien, Norway
- Helena Mannervesi, Finland
- Michael Mamleev, Italy and Russia
- Daniel Marston, United Kingdom
- Bernard Marti, Switzerland
- Reijo Mattinen, Finland
- Stig Mattsson, Sweden
- Annelies Meier, Switzerland
- Anja Meldo, Finland
- Hans Melin, Sweden
- Naďa Mertová, Czechoslovakia
- Matthias Merz, Switzerland
- Marika Mikkola, Finland
- Pepa Milusheva, Bulgaria
- Eva Moberg, Sweden
- Johan Modig, Sweden
- Allan Mogensen, Denmark
- Heather Monro, United Kingdom
- Sarolta Monspart, Hungary
- Anders Morelius, Sweden
- Jonathan Musgrave, United Kingdom
- Lea Müller, Switzerland
- Agneta Månsson, Sweden
- Kerstin Månsson, Sweden
- Jörgen Mårtensson, Sweden
- Matti Mäkinen, Finland
- Jussi Mäkilä, Finland
- Vesa Mäkipää, Finland
- Hannu Mäkirinta, Finland
- Ulla Mänttäri, Finland
- Willi Müller, Switzerland

== N ==
- Simone Niggli-Luder, Switzerland
- Kiril Nikolov, Bulgaria
- Cecilia Nilsson, Sweden
- Kajsa Nilsson, Sweden
- Anders Nordberg, Norway
- Björn Nordin, Sweden
- Bertil Nordqvist, Sweden
- Sivar Nordström, Sweden
- Bertil Norman, Sweden
- Valentin Novikov, Russia
- Olga Novikova, Russia
- Julia Novikova, Russia
- Petra Novotná, Czech Republic
- Radek Novotný, Czech Republic
- Arja Nuolioja, Finland
- Simo Nurminen, Finland
- Risto Nuuros, Finland
- Gun-Britt Nyberg, Sweden
- Sanna Nymalm, Finland
- Olle Nåbo, Sweden
- Mona Nørgaard, Denmark

== O ==
- Ingrid Ohlsson, Sweden
- Marie Ohlsson, Sweden
- Mirja Ojanen, Finland
- Dagfinn Olsen, Norway
- Tommy Olsen, Norway
- Jörgen Olsson, Sweden
- Kent Olsson, Sweden
- Katalin Oláh, Hungary
- Ellen Sofie Olsvik, Norway
- Yuri Omeltchenko, Ukraine, winner of the 1995 World Orienteering Championships short distance

== P ==
- Keijo Parkkinen, Finland
- Stephen Palmer, United Kingdom
- Lars Palmqvist, Sweden
- Hilde Gjermundshaug Pedersen, Norway
- Lasse Brun Pedersen, Denmark
- Juha Peltola, Finland
- Katharina Perch-Nielsen, Switzerland
- Raino Pesu, Finland
- Anna Persson, Sweden
- Lina Persson, Sweden
- Gert Pettersson, Sweden
- Håkan Pettersson, Sweden
- Rolf Pettersson, Sweden
- Marja Liisa Portin, Finland
- Dana Procházková, Czechoslovakia
- Mirja Puhakka, Finland
- Markus Puusepp, Estonia
- Pekka Pökälä, Finland

== R ==
- Karin Rabe, Sweden
- Katja Rajaniemi, Finland
- Helena Randáková, Czech Republic
- Merja Rantanen, Finland
- Kimmo Rauhamäki, Finland
- Kjersti Reenaas, Norway
- Marte Reenaas, Norway
- Damien Renard, France
- Marianne Riddervold, Norway
- Baptiste Rollier, Switzerland
- Marie-Luce Romanens, Switzerland
- Björn Rosendahl, Sweden
- Erik Rost, Sweden
- Irén Rostás, Hungary
- Jørgen Rostrup, Norway
- Rudolf Ropek, Czech Republic
- Vilma Rudzenskaitė, Lithuania
- Johan Runesson, Sweden
- Marita Ruoho, Finland
- Pirjo Ruotsalainen, Finland
- Tatiana Ryabkina, Russia
- Seppo Rytkönen, Finland
- Astrid Rødmyr, Norway

== S ==
- Tore Sagvolden, Norway
- Kari Sallinen, Finland
- Raili Sallinen, Finland
- Juhani Salmenkylä, Finland
- Leena Salmenkylä, Finland
- Janne Salmi, Finland
- Markku Salminen, Finland
- Hanne Sandstad, Norway
- Tore Sandvik, Norway
- Lena Samuelsson, Sweden
- Eveli Saue, Estonia
- Ieva Sargautytė, Lithuania
- Sanna Savolainen, Finland
- Christine Schaffner, Switzerland
- Karin Schmalfeld, Germany
- Ruth Schmid, Switzerland
- David Schneider, Switzerland
- Alex Schwager, Switzerland
- Frauke Schmitt Gran, Germany
- Pirjo Seppä, Finland
- Olga Shevchenko, Russia
- Maria Shilova, Russia
- Lauri Sild, Estonia
- Sixten Sild, Estonia
- Timo Sild, Estonia
- Kaija Silvennoinen, Finland
- Leena Silvennoinen, Finland
- Ivan Sirakov, Bulgaria
- Martins Sirmais, Latvia
- Aliya Sitdikova, Russia
- Anders Skarholt, Norway
- Ola Skarholt, Norway
- Lars Skjeset, Norway
- Marita Skogum, Sweden
- Torben Skovlyst, Denmark
- Hanne Sletner, Norway
- Bill Smith (Fell runner), United Kingdom
- Peter Snell, New Zealand
- Michal Smola, Czech Republic
- Hanne Staff, Norway
- Markus Stappung, Switzerland
- Eivor Steen-Olsson, Sweden
- Marta Štěrbová, Czech Republic
- Jamie Stevenson, United Kingdom
- Søren Strunge, Denmark
- Kine Hallan Steiwer, Norway
- János Sotér, Hungary
- Örjan Svahn, Sweden
- Olavi Svanberg, Finland
- Eva Svensson, Sweden
- Harald Svergja, Norway
- Šárka Svobodná, Czech Republic
- Gunilla Svärd, Sweden
- Helene Söderlund, Sweden
- János Sőtér, Hungary

== T ==
- Veijo Tahvanainen, Finland
- Olli-Markus Taivainen, Finland
- Silja Tarvonen, Finland
- Heimo Taskinen, Finland
- Jorunn Teigen, Norway
- Hilde Tellesbø, Norway
- Chris Terkelsen, Denmark
- Ekaterina Terekhova, Russia
- Mika Tervala, Finland
- Aimo Tepsell, Finland
- Margrit Thommen, Switzerland
- Harald Thon, Norway
- Øyvin Thon, Norway
- Petter Thoresen, Norway
- Jan-Erik Thorn, Sweden
- Pertti Tikka, Finland
- Vadim Tolstopyatov, Russia
- Natalia Tomilova, Russia
- Päivi Tommola, Finland
- Eivind Tonna, Norway
- Hannele Tonna, Finland
- Marcel Tschopp, Liechtenstein
- Dmitriy Tsvetkov, Russia
- Staffan Tunis, Finland
- Tuomo Tompuri, Finland
- Jon Tvedt, Norway
- Håvard Tveite, Norway

== U ==
- Kjetil Ulven, Norway
- Siri Ulvestad, Norway
- Lars-Henrik Undeland, Sweden

== V ==
- Maret Vaher, Estonia
- Géza Vajda, Hungary
- Indrė Valaitė, Lithuania
- Bjørnar Valstad, Norway
- Pekka Varis, Finland
- Liisa Veijalainen, Finland
- Linda Verde, Norway
- Kirill Veselov, Russia
- Rolf Vestre, Norway
- Annika Viilo, Finland
- Galina Vinogradova, Russia
- Renata Vlachová, Czechoslovakia
- Tatiana Vlasova, Russia
- Brit Volden, Norway
- Giedrė Voverienė, Lithuania
- Edgaras Voveris, Lithuania
- Matti Väisänen, Finland
- Mervi Väisänen, Finland
- Seppo Väli-Klemelä, Finland

== W ==
- Ann-Marie Wallsten, Sweden
- Michael Wehlin, Sweden
- Eystein Weltzien, Norway
- Emil Wingstedt, Sweden
- Brigitte Wolf, Switzerland
- Dieter Wolf, Switzerland
- Ingunn Hultgreen Weltzien, Norway

== Z ==
- Annika Zell, Sweden

== Å ==
- Gunborg Åhling, Sweden
- Tobias Åslund, Sweden

== Ā ==
- Valters Āboliņš, Latvia

== Ö ==
- Peter Öberg, Sweden
- Göran Öhlund, Sweden
- Gunnar Öhlund, Sweden
- Kaspar Öttli, Switzerland

== Ø ==
- Marit Økern, Norway
- Øystein Kvaal Østerbø, Norway

== By country ==
- Australian orienteers
- Austrian orienteers
- British orienteers
- Bulgarian orienteers
- Czech orienteers
- Czechoslovak orienteers
- Danish orienteers
- Estonian orienteers
- Finnish orienteers
- French orienteers
- German orienteers
- Hungarian orienteers
- Italian orienteers
- Latvian orienteers
- Lithuanian orienteers
- New Zealand orienteers
- Norwegian orienteers
- Polish orienteers
- Romanian orienteers
- Russian orienteers
- Slovak orienteers
- Soviet orienteers
- Swedish orienteers
- Swiss orienteers
- Ukrainian orienteers

== Innovators ==
- Chris Brasher, one of the pioneers of orienteering in Britain and can claim the first public mention of the sport in an article in The Observer in 1957
- Ernst Killander, one of the people who made the sport of orienteering popular in Scandinavian countries
- Björn Kjellström, orienteering champion and co-founder of the compass manufacturing company Silva Sweden AB
- Jan Kjellström, played an important role in the development of the sport of orienteering in Great Britain
- Per Kristiansen, involved in orienteering training in Norway and also written several books on handbook on training and competition
- Martin Kronlund, introduced and developed the sport of orienteering in Spain
- Jan Martin Larsen, pioneer in the development of the specialized orienteering map
