= Hovi =

Hovi is a masculine given name and a surname. It may refer to:

== Surname ==
- Arlinda Dudaj (Hovi) (born 1977), Albanian publisher
- Kimmo Hovi (born 1994), Finnish football (soccer) player
- Raila Hovi, Finnish orienteering competitor
- Sasu Hovi (born 1982), Finnish ice hockey player
- Tom Henning Hovi (born 1972), Norwegian football (soccer) player
- Tommi Hovi (born 1980), Finnish professional Magic: The Gathering player
- Torger Hovi (1905–1980), Norwegian politician
- Tuula Hovi (born 1939), Finnish orienteering competitor
- Venla Hovi (born 1987), Finnish ice hockey player

== Given name ==
- Hovi Star (born 1986), real name Hovav Sekulets, Israeli singer

== Others ==
- "Hovi Baby", song by Jay-Z from his 2002 album The Blueprint2: The Gift & The Curse

== See also ==
- Hovis (disambiguation)
