= Öhlund =

Öhlund is a surname. Notable people with the surname include:

- Göran Öhlund (born 1942), Swedish orienteering competitor
- Gunnar Öhlund (born 1947), Swedish orienteering competitor
- Mattias Öhlund (born 1976), Swedish professional ice hockey defenceman
- Robert Ohlund (born 1961), American author and professional engineer
