= Silvennoinen =

Silvennoinen is a Finnish surname. Notable people with the surname include:

- Emmi Silvennoinen (born 1988), Finnish keyboard player
- Heikki Silvennoinen (1954–2024), Finnish musician and actor
- Hemmo Silvennoinen (1932–2002), Finnish ski jumper
- Kaija Silvennoinen (born 1954), Finnish ski orienteering competitor
- Lauri Silvennoinen (1916–2004), Finnish cross-country skier
- Leena Silvennoinen (born 1958), Finnish orienteering competitor
- Mikko Silvennoinen, Finnish television host, journalist and producer
