= Juhani Salmenkylä =

Finnish orienteering competitor (1932–2022)

Medal record

Men's orienteering

Representing Finland

World Championships
Silver medal – second place	1966 Fiskars	Relay
Silver medal – second place	1968 Linköping	Relay

European Championships
Gold medal – first place	1964 Le Brassus	Relay

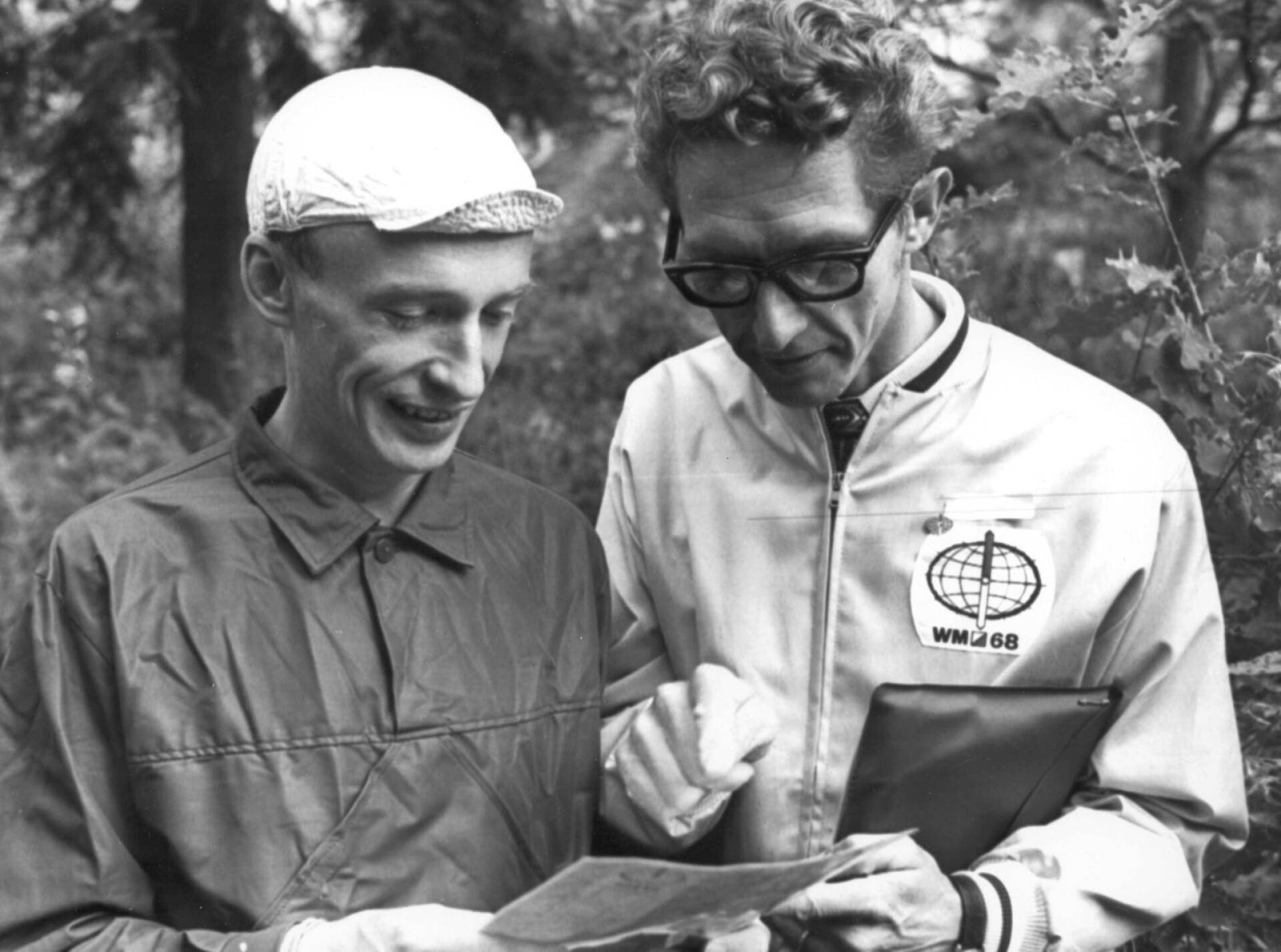
Photograph of the Finnish athlete Juhani Salmenkylä (1932–2022) and the Swedish athlete Bertil Norman

Juhani Salmenkylä (8 March 1932 – 4 May 2022) was a Finnish orienteering competitor and European champion, basketball player, coach, referee and contributor. He was born in Helsinki. In orienteering he won a gold medal with the Finnish relay team at the 1964 European Orienteering Championships in Le Brassus.

== Orienteering ==
Salmenkylä received a silver medal in the relay at the 1966 World Orienteering Championships with the Finnish team, and again in 1968.

His daughter Leena Salmenkylä was World Champion in relay in 1979.

He won the Jukola relay seven times, winning first at the second edition in 1950 at the age of 18 and winning last in 1970 at the age of 38. He also won the second edition of O-Ringen in 1966.

== Basketball ==
Salmenkylä impacted Finnish basketball with large radius. As a player, he won seven national championships. As a referee he participated in many tournaments abroad, including the 1964 Summer Olympics in Tokyo. He was also a top tier coach in Finland, and served as the head of Finnish Basketball Association in 1969–1972.

In August 2015 Salmenkylä was inducted into the Finnish Basketball Hall of Fame.

== See also ==
- Finnish orienteers
- List of orienteers
- List of orienteering events
