= IFK Hedemora =

Swedish sports club

IFK Hedemora is a Swedish sports club in Hedemora practicing football, cross-country skiing, and orienteering.

== Orienteering ==
The club won Tiomila in 1957, but it dropped to place 28 next year. It won again in 1960.

It won the Swedish championships in relay for men in 1952, 1959 and 1963. It came second in 1962.

Anders Morelius and Bertil Norman have run for the club.

For orienteering and cross-country skiing the club has a house on Brunnsjöberget to the west of the town.
