= Åge Hadler =

Norwegian orienteer (born 1944)

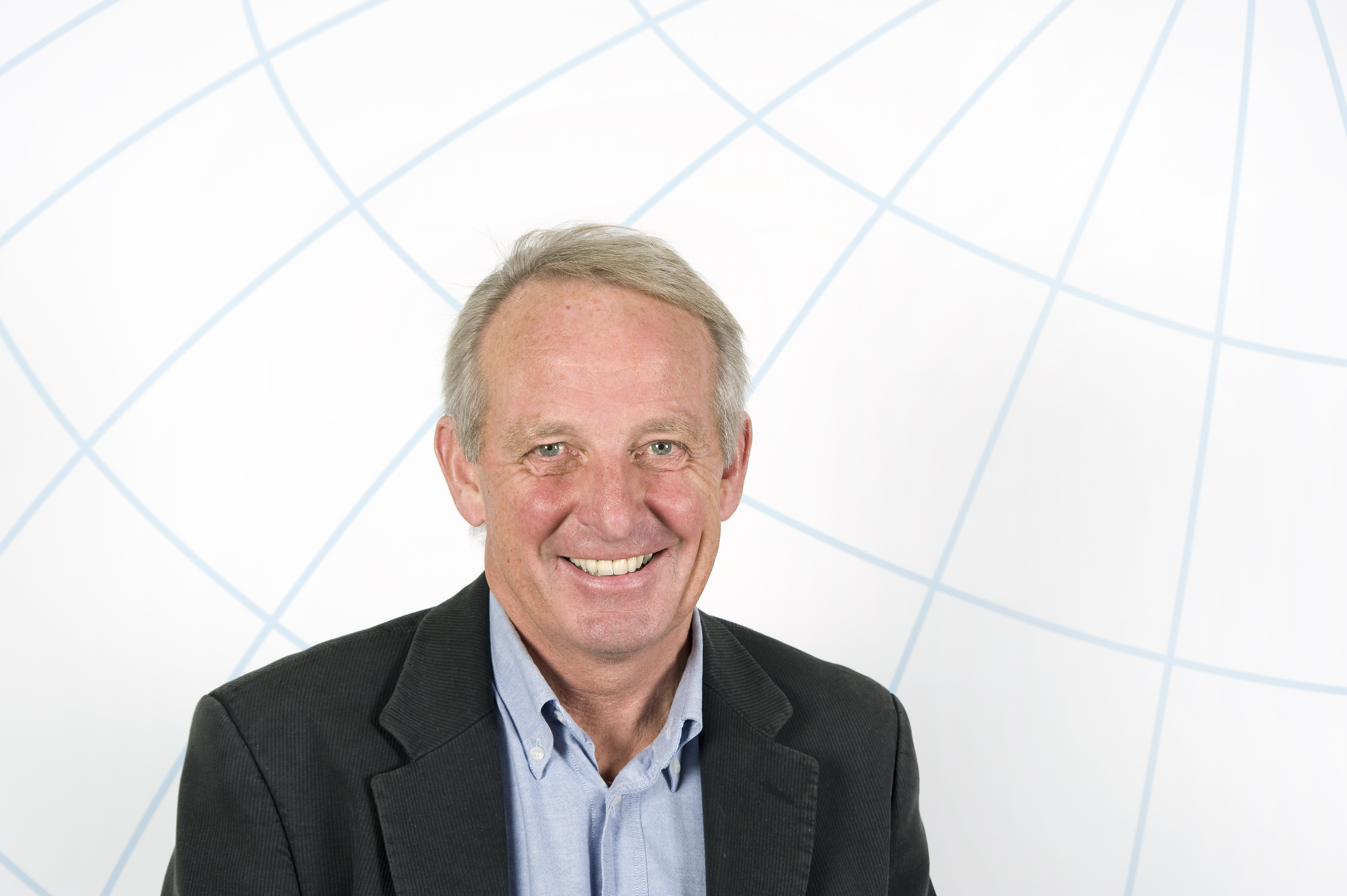

Personal information
- Born: 14 August 1944 (age 81) Bergen, Norway
- Spouse: Ingrid Hadler

Sport
- Sport: Orienteering
- Club: Bergens TF; IL Tyrving; IL i BUL
Medal record
Men's orienteering
Representing Norway
World Championships
Gold medal – first place	1966 Fiskars	Individual
Gold medal – first place	1970 Eisenach	Relay
Gold medal – first place	1972 Jicin	Individual
Bronze medal – third place	1966 Fiskars	Relay
Bronze medal – third place	1968 Linköping	Individual
Bronze medal – third place	1968 Linköping	Relay

Åge Hadler (born 14 August 1944) is a Norwegian orienteering competitor, winner of the 1966 and 1972 individual World Orienteering Championships, relay champion from 1970, and individual bronze medalist from 1968.

== Early life and career ==
Hadler was born in Bergen as the son of Aage Hadler and Ruth Karin Rosendahl. He married fellow orienteer Ingrid Thoresen in 1968. His first sports club was Bergens Turnforening. He studied at the University of Oslo, and graduated as cand.real. degree in 1970.

== Sports career ==
Hadler had his breakthrough in competitive orienteering in 1966. He participated at the very first World Orienteering Championships, which were held in Fiskars, Finland, 2 and 3 October. Here he won the first individual World Champion title in men's Orienteering. The individual course had 11 controls over 14.1 kilometres. Hadler won the competition with a margin of 2 minutes and 45 seconds before Aimo Tepsell from Finland, who placed second. Anders Morelius from Sweden placed third in the individual race. Hadler participated on the Norwegian relay team together with Dagfinn Olsen, Ola Skarholt and Stig Berge, and won a bronze medal behind Sweden and Finland. Hadler married fellow orienteer Ingrid Thoresen 17 August 1968. They both qualified for the World Championships, which were held in Linköping, Sweden, 28 and 29 September. Hadler won a bronze medal in the individual course, and also a bronze medal in the relay. His wife Ingrid won a silver medal in the women's individual contest, and a gold medal in the relay. Hadler became individual Nordic Champion in Orienteering in 1969. In 1970 the World Championships were held in Friedrichroda, in the Democratic Republic of Germany, from 27 to 29 September. Hadler placed 8th in the individual contest, which was won by Stig Berge. The relay was won by the Norwegian team, which consisted of Hadler and Ola Skarholt, Stig Berge and Per Fosser. His wife Ingrid won gold medal in the individual course at the women's World Championships. In 1970 Hadler published the book På tvers av stiene. Med giftering, kart og kompass, as co-author along with his wife Ingrid Hadler. In 1971 he became individual Nordic Champion for the second time. The 1972 World Orienteering Championships were held in Staré Splavy, Czechoslovakia, from 14 to 16 September. Hadler won the individual contest before Stig Berge, his second individual gold medal at the World Championships.

Hadler won eight individual National Championships from 1966 to 1975. He is honorary member of the sports club IL i BUL.

== Later career ==
Hadler was appointed as a research worker at the institution Fondet for markeds- og distribusjonsforskning in 1971, and served as manager from 1976 to 1986. He was appointed at the Norwegian Mapping Authority from 1986. He is currently serving as a communication advisor.
