= Sten-Olof Carlström =

Swedish orienteering competitor

Medal record

Men's orienteering

Representing Sweden

World Championships
Gold medal – first place	1968 Linköping	Relay

Sten-Olof Carlström (born 18 January 1942) is a Swedish orienteering competitor. He was a member of the men's Swedish relay team that won the World Orienteering Championships in Linköping in 1968, together with Sture Björk, Karl Johansson and Göran Öhlund.
