= Pirjo Ruotsalainen =

Finnish orienteering competitor

Medal record

Women's orienteering

Representing Finland

World Championships
Silver medal – second place	1966 Fiskars	Relay

Pirjo Ruotsalainen (born 24 November 1944 in Viipurin maalaiskunta) is a Finnish orienteering competitor. She received a silver medal in the relay event at the 1966 World Orienteering Championships in Fiskars together with Anja Meldo and Raila Hovi.

== See also ==
- Finnish orienteers
- List of orienteers
- List of orienteering events
