= Agesen =

Agesen is a surname. Notable people with the surname include:

- Karin Ågesen, Danish orienteer
- Mads Agesen (born 1983), Danish footballer
