= Karin Ågesen =

Danish orienteer

Sport
- Sport: Orienteering
Medal record
Representing Denmark
Women's orienteering
European Championships
Bronze medal – third place	1964 Le Brassus	Relay

Karin Ågesen is a Danish orienteer. She competed at the first European Orienteering Championships in 1962, where she placed 8th in the individual contest and fourth in the unofficial relay with the Danish team. She won a bronze medal in the relay with the Danish team at the 1964 European Orienteering Championships in Le Brassus.

At the 1966 World Orienteering Championships in Fiskars, Finland, she placed 22nd in the individual contest, and also competed with the Danish relay team.
