= Jostein Nilsen =

Norwegian orienteer

Personal information
- Nationality: Norwegian

Sport
- Sport: Orienteering
- Club: Skogn IL

Jostein Nilsen is a Norwegian orienteering competitor who competed in the 1960s and 1970s, and represented Norway at three world championships.

Nilsen competed at the 1966 World Orienteering Championships in Fiskars, Finland, where he placed 14th in the individual contest. At the 1968 World Orienteering Championships in Linköping, Sweden, he placed 7th in the individual course, and at the 1970 World Championships in Friedrichroda, East Germany, he again placed 7th in the individual contest.
