= Sletner =

Sletner is a Norwegian surname. Notable people with the surname include:

- Hanne Sletner (born 1972), Norwegian retired ski-orienteering competitor
- Rita Sletner (born 1960), Norwegian politician
- Siri Ellen Sletner (born 1953), Norwegian diplomat
