= Dagfinn Olsen =

Norwegian orienteer

Medal record

Men's orienteering

Representing Norway

World Championships
Bronze medal – third place	1966 Fiskars	Relay

Dagfinn Olsen is a Norwegian orienteering competitor. He won a bronze medal in the relay event at the 1966 World Orienteering Championships in Fiskars together with Ola Skarholt, Åge Hadler and Stig Berge, and placed fourth in the individual contest.
