= Sture Björk =

Swedish orienteering competitor

Medal record

Men's orienteering

Representing Sweden

World Championships
Gold medal – first place	1968 Linköping	Relay
Silver medal – second place	1968 Linköping	Individual
Silver medal – second place	1970 Eisenach	Relay

Sture Björk is a Swedish orienteering competitor. He is Relay World Champion from 1968, as a member of the Swedish winning team, together with Sten-Olof Carlström, Karl Johansson and Göran Öhlund. He also obtained silver medal in the relay at the 1970 World Orienteering Championships in Eisenach, together with Björn Nordin, Karl Johansson and Bernt Frilén.

Björk has run for both OK Malmia and Ludvika OK.
