= Tuula Hovi =

Finnish orienteering competitor

Medal record

Women's orienteering

Representing Finland

World Championships
Bronze medal – third place	1968 Linköping	Relay

Tuula Hovi (born 14 November 1939) is a Finnish orienteering competitor who competed in the 1960s. She participated at the first European Orienteering Championships in Løten, Norway, in 1962, where she placed fourth in the individual course. At the 1964 Championships in Le Brassus, she placed sixth in the individual course, and also participated in the Finnish relay team which placed fifth.

At the 1968 World Orienteering Championships in Linköping she placed 11th in the individual course, and won a bronze medal in the relay event for the Finnish team, together with Pirjo Seppä and Raila Kerkelä.

== See also ==
- List of orienteers
- List of orienteering events
