= Ragnhild Kristensen =

Norwegian orienteer

Medal record

Women's orienteering

Representing Norway

World Championships
Bronze medal – third place	1966 Fiskars	Relay

Ragnhild Kristensen is a Norwegian orienteering competitor. She competed at the very first World Orienteering Championships in Fiskars in 1966, where she placed 11th in the individual course, and won a bronze medal in the relay event, together with Astrid Hansen and Ingrid Thoresen.
