= Anja Meldo =

Finnish orienteering competitor (born 1945)

Medal record

Women's orienteering

Representing Finland

World Championships
Silver medal – second place	1966 Fiskars	Relay

Anja Meldo (born 19 April 1945) is a Finnish orienteering competitor. She received a silver medal in the relay event at the 1966 World Orienteering Championships in Fiskars together with Pirjo Ruotsalainen and Raila Hovi.

== See also ==
- Finnish orienteers
- List of orienteers
- List of orienteering events
