= Rolf Koskinen =

Finnish orienteer (1939–2010)

Medal record

Men's orienteering

Representing Finland

World Championships
Silver medal – second place	1966 Fiskars	Relay
Silver medal – second place	1968 Linköping	Relay

European Championships
Gold medal – first place	1964 Le Brassus	Relay

Rolf Koskinen (21 July 1939 – 8 January 2010) was a Finnish orienteering competitor and European champion. He won a gold medal with the Finnish relay team at the 1964 European Orienteering Championships in Le Brassus. He was also member of the Finnish team that won the relay at the 1962 European championships, while not part of the official program.

He received a silver medal in the relay at the 1966 World Orienteering Championships with the Finnish team, and again in 1968.

Koskinen won the Jukola relay in 1971 with IK Örnen.

== See also ==
- Finnish orienteers
- List of orienteers
- List of orienteering events
