= Erkki Kohvakka =

Finnish orienteer (1937–2018)

Medal record

Men's orienteering

Representing Finland

World Championships
Silver medal – second place	1966 Fiskars	Relay

European Championships
Gold medal – first place	1964 Le Brassus	Individual
Gold medal – first place	1964 Le Brassus	Relay

Erkki Kohvakka (2 July 1937 – 23 January 2018) was a Finnish orienteering competitor and European champion. He won a gold medal in the individual 1964 European Orienteering Championships in Le Brassus, and also a gold medal with the Finnish relay team. He was also member of the Finnish team that won the relay at the 1962 European championships, while not part of the official program.

He received a silver medal in the relay at the 1966 World Orienteering Championships with the Finnish team.

== See also ==
- Finnish orienteers
- List of orienteers
- List of orienteering events
