= 1966 World Orienteering Championships =

1966 edition of the World Orienteering Championships

- Host city: Fiskars
- Country: Finland
- Nations: 11
- Teams: 10 (men); 9 (women)
- Athletes: 58 (men); 35 (women)
- Events: 4
- Opening: 1 October 1966
- Closing: 2 October 1966

The 1st World Orienteering Championships were held in the village of Fiskars, Finland, 1–2 October 1966.

Participants from eleven nations competed in the championships: Austria, Bulgaria, Czechoslovakia, Denmark, East Germany, Finland, Great Britain, Hungary, Norway, Sweden and Switzerland. The medals were distributed between Sweden (3 gold, 1 bronze), Finland (3 silver, 1 bronze), Norway (1 gold, 2 bronze) and Switzerland (1 silver medal).

The men's individual course had 11 controls over 14.1 kilometres, while the women's individual course had 10 controls over 8.1 kilometres.

The first individual world champions in orienteering came from Norway and Sweden. Winner of the men's competition was Åge Hadler from Norway. Hadler regarded the eighth control, which was located in thick forest, as the most difficult, where the last part of the leg required meticulous map reading and frequent checking of the compass. Ulla Lindkvist from Sweden won the women's competition. Sweden won the men's relay, which had four legs, with a margin of nearly eight minutes. Sweden also won the women's relay, which had three legs, with a margin of 21 seconds to silver medalist Finland.

The championships were attended by President of Finland, Urho Kekkonen, who was present at the finishing area.

== Medalists ==
Event	Gold		Silver		Bronze	
Men's individual	Åge Hadler (NOR)	1:36:05	Aimo Tepsell (FIN)	1:38:47	Anders Morelius (SWE)	1:40:05
Women's individual	Ulla Lindkvist (SWE)	52:45	Katharina Perch-Nielsen (SUI)	1:00:30	Raila Hovi (FIN)	1:00:51
Men's relay	Sweden (SWE): Bertil Norman; Karl Johansson; Anders Morelius; Göran Öhlund	3.51.42	Finland (FIN): Erkki Kohvakka; Rolf Koskinen; Juhani Salmenkylä; Aimo Tepsell	3.59.34	Norway (NOR): Dagfinn Olsen; Ola Skarholt; Åge Hadler; Stig Berge	4.26.35
Women's relay	Sweden (SWE): Kerstin Granstedt; Eivor Steen-Olsson; Gunborg Åhling	2.42.58	Finland (FIN): Anja Meldo; Pirjo Ruotsalainen; Raila Hovi	2.43.19	Norway (NOR): Astrid Hansen; Ragnhild Kristensen; Ingrid Thoresen	2.54.29

== Results ==
=== Men's individual ===
WOC 1966 – Individual – Men (14.1 km)
Rank	Competitor	Nation	Time
1st place, gold medalist(s)	Åge Hadler	Norway	1:36:05
2nd place, silver medalist(s)	Aimo Tepsell	Finland	1:38:47
3rd place, bronze medalist(s)	Anders Morelius	Sweden	1:40:05
4	Dagfinn Olsen	Norway	1:40:37
5	Juhani Salmenkylä	Finland	1:40:38
6	Göran Öhlund	Sweden	1:41:05
7	Rolf Koskinen	Finland	1:41:11
8	Stig Berge	Norway	1:42:23
9	Karl Johansson	Sweden	1:42:48
10	Heino Avikainen	Finland	1:45:38
11	Erkki Kohvakka	Finland	1:45:52
12	Ola Skarholt	Norway	1:45:57
13	Hans Ekberg	Sweden	1:48:10
14	Jostein Nilsen	Norway	1:48:26
15	Hannu Haarma	Finland	1:49:10
16	Alex Schwager	Switzerland	1:50:08
17	Bertil Norman	Sweden	1:50:26
18	Erik Engebråten	Norway	1:50:30
19	Sven-Ola Darell	Sweden	1:51:19
20	Keld Olsen	Denmark	1:54:41
21	Leif Nörgård	Denmark	1:55:16
22	Flemming Nörgård	Denmark	2:00:16
23	Svatoslav Galík	Czechoslovakia	2:03:41
24	Max Jüni	Switzerland	2:06:06
25	Finn Faxner	Denmark	2:07:20
26	Christian Jaggi	Switzerland	2:08:57
27	Fritz Maurer	Switzerland	2:12:02
28	Helmut Conrad	East Germany	2:12:26
29	Roland Hirter	Switzerland	2:12:27
30	Peter Nilsen	Denmark	2:13:17
31	Jindrich Novotny	Czechoslovakia	2:13:25
32	Jörn Esbensen	Denmark	2:16:21
33	Harald Grosse	East Germany	2:16:45
34	Andreas Örsi	Hungary	2:17:42
35	Antonin Urbanec	Czechoslovakia	2:17:47
36	Gustav Bartak	Czechoslovakia	2:20:03
37	Iwan Skerletz	Hungary	2:20:34
38	Alois Lasnicka	Czechoslovakia	2:27:27
39	Georg Schönviszky	Bulgaria	2:30:05
40	Franz Trampusch	Austria	2:32:08
41	Ernst Saxer	Switzerland	2:32:27
42	Alistair Patten	Great Britain	2:33:09
43	Ladislaus Deseö	Hungary	2:33:27
44	Rolf Heinemann	East Germany	2:33:37
45	Michail Galov	Bulgaria	2:36:06
46	Gordon Pirie	Great Britain	2:43:48
47	Thomas Balogh	Hungary	2:45:48
48	David Griffiths	Great Britain	2:47:07
49	John Disley	Great Britain	2:48:56
50	Georgi Gealtov	Bulgaria	2:51:24
51	Achim Zemanek	East Germany	3:01:56
52	Haralan Haralanoff	Austria	3:05:55
53	Michael Murray	Great Britain	3:16:52
54	Raimund Sobotka	Austria	3:23:57
55	Tony Walker	Great Britain	3:29:12
56	Grigor Kaloianov	Bulgaria	3:55:30
DSQ	Nikola Bedelev	Bulgaria	
DSQ	Sepp Michael Pacher	Austria	

=== Women's individual ===
WOC 1966 – Individual – Women
Rank	Competitor	Nation	Time
1st place, gold medalist(s)	Ulla Lindkvist	Sweden	52:45
2nd place, silver medalist(s)	Katherina Perch-Nielsen	Switzerland	1:00:30
3rd place, bronze medalist(s)	Raila Hovi	Finland	1:00:51
4	Kerstin Granstedt	Sweden	1:01:30
5	Eivor Steen-Olsson	Sweden	1:02:54
6	Ingrid Thoresen	Norway	1:03:29
7	Annakäthi Grieder	Switzerland	1:04:58
8	Anja Meldo	Finland	1:05:06
9	Sarolta Monspart	Hungary	1:05:25
10	Gunborg Åhling	Sweden	1:05:33
11	Ragnhild Kristensen	Norway	1:09:36
12	Vibeke Såbye Christensen	Denmark	1:11:44
13	Barbara Cser	Hungary	1:12:18
14	Astrid Hansen	Norway	1:13:07
15	Erika Wauer	East Germany	1:14:05
16	Marianne Selbo	Denmark	1:16:20
17	Nadezda Linhartova	Czechoslovakia	1:16:59
18	Pirjo Ruotsalainen	Finland	1:17:38
19	Anna-Liisa Nissi	Finland	1:17:50
20	Ulrike Heinemann	East Germany	1:18:08
21	Dobruse Novotna	Czechoslovakia	1:19:40
22	Karin Ågesen	Denmark	1:23:10
23	Ria Meyer	East Germany	1:24:29
24	Ludmila Kumbarova	Czechoslovakia	1:28:23
25	Delia Stoeva	Bulgaria	1:28:44
26	Irene Köhli	Switzerland	1:29:15
27	Bjørg Knudsen	Norway	1:38:05
28	Eliza Stoianova	Bulgaria	1:39:35
29	Olga Tascheva	Bulgaria	1:40:52
30	Eva Hohausova	Czechoslovakia	1:44:52
31	Christine Lüdin	Switzerland	1:49:34
32	Bodil Jakobsen	Denmark	1:51:43
33	Margarete Babay	Hungary	2:10:58
34	Gisela Haralanoff	Austria	2:25:14
35	Magdalene Molnar	Hungary	2:25:59
