= Katharina Perch-Nielsen =

Swiss geologist and orienteering competitor (born 1940)

- Born: 26 October 1940 (age 85); Switzerland
- Occupations: geologist, micropaleontologist
- Employer: Swiss Federal Institute of Technology
- Awards: Steno Medal (1998); The Brady Medal (2008)

Katharina Perch-Nielsen
Medal record

Women's orienteering

Representing Switzerland

World Championships
Silver medal – second place	1966 Fiskars	Individual

European Championships
Silver medal – second place	1964 Le Brassus	Relay

Katharina von Salis Perch-Nielsen (born 26 October 1940) is a Swiss geologist and orienteering competitor. She is a retired adjunct professor at the Department of Earth Sciences at ETH Zurich in Switzerland. She retired 1 October 2001. During her scientific career, as a professor in the Micropaleontology at the Geological Institute at ETH Zurich, she was highly engaged in promoting gender equality in sciences and active in fighting to improve the position of girls and women in sciences at Swiss universities and high schools. She was at the origin of the Office of Equal Opportunities for Men and Women that has existed at ETH Zurich since 1993.

== Early life and education ==
Born in 1940 in Zurich, Switzerland, Perch-Nielsen studied geology at the University of Berne where she also received her PhD in 1965 in geology and sedimentology.

== Sports career ==
She competed at the very first European Orienteering Championships, in 1962, where she placed 6th in the individual contest. She also won a bronze medal in the unofficial relay, with the Swiss team. At the 1964 European Orienteering Championships, she won a silver medal in the relay for Switzerland, and placed tenth in the individual event. She won a silver medal in the individual event at the 1966 World Orienteering Championships in Fiskars, and finished 4th in the relay event with the Swiss team.

She made several climbing first-ascents. However, back then she was not allowed to join the exclusively male Alpine climbing club at the Berne University (which was funded by her grandfather).

== Scientific career ==
Perch-Nielson started her career as a postdoctoral researcher first in Copenhagen in Denmark and then in Paris. In 1968, she got a lecturer position in Copenhagen where she stayed till 1974. Between 1974 and 1989, she moved with her family to Zurich, Amsterdam, Vienna, The Hague, and London, before coming back to Zurich. During this time, she held academic positions in the Free University Amsterdam and the Naturhistorisches Museum Vienna, but also worked for Shell as a consultant biostratigrapher. In 1989, she was appointed professor at the Swiss Federal Institute of Technology (ETH) in Zürich.

== Awards ==
Perch-Nielsen was awarded the Steno Medal in 1998, for her work in micropaleontology in Denmark and Greenland, and as a pioneer in the study of coccoliths. In 2003 she was awarded Honorary Membership of the International Nannoplankton Association and in 2007 she got the Prize by the Somazzi Foundation for her work in geology and equal opportunity. In 2008, Perch-Nielsen got the Brady medal for her contribution in the fields of biostratigraphy and palaeobiology and her knowledge on nannofossils.

== Personal life ==
A daughter of Charlotte v. Salis, Perch-Nielsen grew up in Zollikofen, in the canton of Bern in Switzerland. Her grandmother was a painter, mountaineer and a single mother. Her mother was a journalist. She married Danish chemical engineer Jørgen Perch-Nielsen, and has three daughters Nina, Christina and Sabine.

== Selected works ==
- Geologische und sedimentologische Untersuchungen in Molasse und Quartär südöstlich Wolhusen (1965)
- Der Feinbau und die Klassifikation der Coccolithen aus dem Maastrichtien von Dänemark (1968)
- Revision of Triassic stratigraphy of the Scoresby Land and Jameson Land region, East Greenland (1974)
