= 1970 World Orienteering Championships =

1970 edition of the World Orienteering Championships

- Host city: Eisenach/Friedrichroda
- Country: East Germany
- Events: 4

The 3rd World Orienteering Championships were held in Eisenach/Friedrichroda, East Germany, in September 1970.

The championships had four events; individual contests for men and women, and relays for men and women.

The men's individual course had 19 controls over 14.5 kilometres, while the women's individual course had 10 controls over 7.5 kilometres.

== Medalists ==
Event	Gold		Silver		Bronze	
Men's individual	Stig Berge (NOR)	1.49.46	Karl John (SUI)	1.51.07,	Dieter Hulliger (SUI)	1.51.46
Women's individual	Ingrid Hadler (NOR)	1.10.39	Ulla Lindkvist (SWE)	1.12.44	Kristin Danielsen (NOR)	1.13.44
Men's relay	Norway (NOR): Ola Skarholt; Stig Berge; Per Fosser; Åge Hadler	3.52.00	Sweden (SWE): Björn Nordin; Karl Johansson; Sture Björk; Bernt Frilén	4.07.06	Czechoslovakia (TCH): Zdeněk Lenhart; Bohuslav Beránek; Jaroslav Jašek; Svatoslav Galík	4.07.20
Women's relay	Sweden (SWE): Birgitta Larsson; Eivor Steen-Olsson; Ulla Lindkvist	2.32.39	Hungary (HUN): Magda Horváth; Ágnes Hegedűs; Sarolta Monspart	2.37.13	Norway (NOR): Astrid Rødmyr; Kristin Danielsen; Ingrid Hadler	2.38.59

== Results ==
=== Men's individual ===
WOC 1970 – Individual – Men (14.5 km)
Rank	Competitor	Nation	Time
1	Stig Berge	Norway	1.49.46
2	Karl John	Switzerland	1.51.07
3	Dieter Hulliger	Switzerland	1.51.46
4	Ola Skarholt	Norway	1.51.46
5	Per Fosser	Norway	1.52.42
6	Flemming Nørgaard	Denmark	1.52.47
7	Jostein Nilsen	Norway	1.54.18
8	Åge Hadler	Norway	1.54.33
9	Karl Johansson	Sweden	1.55.12
10	Reijo Kujansuu	Finland	1.55.53
11	Hans-Dieter Baumgart	East Germany	1.57.06
12	Urs Schaffner	Switzerland	1.57.10
12	Bernt Frilen	Sweden	1.57.10
14	Veijo Tahvanainen	Finland	1.57.13
15	Jaroslav Jašek	Czechoslovakia	1.57.24

=== Women's individual ===
WOC 1970 – Individual – Women (7.5 km)
Rank	Competitor	Nation	Time
1	Ingrid Hadler	Norway	1.10.39
2	Ulla Lindkvist	Sweden	1.12.44
3	Kristin Danielsen	Norway	1.13.44
4	Pirjo Seppä	Finland	1.14.07
5	Helen Thommen	Switzerland	1.14.57
6	Agnes Hegedus	Hungary	1.17.17
7	Eivor Steen-Olsson	Sweden	1.17.24
8	Sarolta Monspart	Hungary	1.17.36
9	Hannelore Bregula	East Germany	1.17.40
10	Ann-Marie Fehrnström	Sweden	1.19.15
11	Anna Gavendová-Handzlová	Czechoslovakia	1.21.15
12	Nadezda Mertova-Linhartova	Czechoslovakia	1.21.58
12	Renata Vlachová	Czechoslovakia	
14	Else Marker-Larsen	Denmark	
15	Astrid Rødmyr	Norway	
