= Västerbergslagens OL =

Swedish orienteering club

Västerbergslagens OL is a Swedish orienteering club in and around Ludvika. It was formed in 1993 by the clubs Grangärde OK, Ludvika OK, OK Malmia, Smedjebackens OK and Ulriksbergs IK.

OK Malmia won the 10-mila relay in 1965 with Sture Björk and Anders Morelius in the team.

Sture Björk has run for both OK Malmia and Ludvika OK. In 1975 he and Christer Hellström was leading in Tiomila for Ludvika OK.
