= Raila Kerkelä =

Finnish orienteering competitor (born 1941)

Medal record

Women's orienteering

Representing Finland

World Championships
Silver medal – second place	1966 Fiskars	Team
Bronze medal – third place	1966 Fiskars	Individual
Bronze medal – third place	1968 Linköping	Relay

Raila Kerkelä (née Hovi; born 13 June 1941 in Vehkalahti) is a Finnish orienteering competitor. She received two medals at the 1966 World Orienteering Championships in Fiskars, a bronze medal in the individual contest (won by Ulla Lindkvist, 35 participants), and a silver medal in the relay with the Finnish team. She received a bronze medal in the relay event at the 1968 World Orienteering Championships in Linköping, together with Pirjo Seppä and Tuula Hovi.

== See also ==
- List of orienteers
- List of orienteering events
