= Alex Schwager =

Swiss orienteering competitor

Medal record

Men's orienteering

Representing Switzerland

European Championships
Silver medal – second place	1964 Le Brassus	Individual

Alex Schwager is a Swiss orienteering competitor. He received a silver medal in the individual event at the 1964 European Orienteering Championships in Le Brassus.

He also competed at the 1966 World Orienteering Championships, where he placed 16th in the individual contest and fourth in the relay with the Swiss team.
