= Helena Randáková =

Czech ski-orienteering competitor

Medal record

Representing Czech Republic

Women's Ski-orienteering

World Championships
Bronze medal – third place	2009 Rusutsu	Relay

Helena Randáková is a Czech ski-orienteering competitor. She won a bronze medal in the relay event at the 2009 World Ski Orienteering Championships, with Barbora Chudíková and Simona Karochová, and placed 5th in the long distance.

== See also ==
- Czech orienteers
- List of orienteers
- List of orienteering events
