= Heimo Taskinen =

Finnish ski orienteering competitor

Medal record

Representing Finland

Men's ski orienteering

World Championships
Gold medal – first place	1975 Hyvinkää	Relay
Bronze medal – third place	1975 Hyvinkää	Individual

Heimo Taskinen (born 25 February 1947 in Varpaisjärvi) is a Finnish ski-orienteering competitor and world champion. He won a gold medal at the first World Ski Orienteering Championships in Hyvinkää in 1975 in the relay event with the Finnish team (with Pekka Pökälä, Jorma Karvonen and Olavi Svanberg). He also received an individual bronze medal in 1975.

== See also ==
- Finnish orienteers
- List of orienteers
- List of orienteering events
