= Hovis (disambiguation) =

Hovis Ltd is a British company that produces flour and bread.

Hovis may also refer to:

- Hovis biscuit, British manufactured digestive biscuit
- Rank Hovis McDougall, now known as RHM plc, United Kingdom food business

== People with the surname ==
- Guy Hovis (1941–2026), American singer
- Hovis Presley (1960–2005), English poet and stand-up comedian
- Larry Hovis (1936–2003), American singer and actor
- Raymond Hovis (born 1934), American politician, former member of the Pennsylvania House of Representatives

== See also ==
- Hovi
