= Erna Aaltonen =

Finnish ceramist (born 1951)

- Born: Erna Kaarina Aaltonen; 29 April 1951 (age 74); Loimaa, Finland
- Education: Kuopio Academy of Design
- Spouse: Howard Smith

Erna Kaarina Aaltonen (born 1951) is a Finnish ceramist. She is known for her textural stoneware vessels.

== Life and career ==
Erna Kaarina Aaltonen was born on 29 April 1951 in Loimaa, Finland. She graduated in 1987, from the Kuopio Academy of Design in Kuopio, Finland.

Aaltonen worked as an intern at the Arabia factories' color laboratory. After graduation, she was hired at Arabia in the new product development laboratory. While working at Arabia she met artist Howard Smith, whom she later married. Aaltonen was a member of the small group of ceramists who launched Arabia's Pro Arte production, working in close collaboration with Arabia artists Heljä Liukko-Sundström, Heikki Orvola, Inkeri Leivo, and Kati Tuominen-Niittylä.

Aaltonen is known for her hand-built round pots and sculptural vessels formed through ribbon-like stoneware coils. From 1988 to 1995, Aaltonen and Howard Smith produced studio ceramics in Tervakoski under the name Arteos. By 1996, Aaltonen and Smith moved to Fiskars in Uusimaa, Finland, and she got her own ceramics workshop.

Since 1997, Aaltonen has exhibited her work in Finland and abroad. Her first exhibition in the United States was at the Dallas Art Fair in 2011. In 2012, Aaltonen had a solo exhibition titled "Nostalgia" at Hedge Gallery in San Francisco, California. She has work in museum collections, including at the Museum Boijmans Van Beuningen in Rotterdam, Netherlands.
