= Barbora Chudíková =

Czech ski-orienteer

Medal record

Representing Czech Republic

Women's Ski-orienteering

World Championships
Silver medal – second place	2009 Rusutsu	Long
Bronze medal – third place	2009 Rusutsu	Relay

Barbora Chudíková (born 1978) is a Czech ski-orienteering competitor. She won a silver medal in the long distance at the 2009 World Ski Orienteering Championships, and a bronze medal in the relay (with Helena Randáková and Simona Karochová).

== See also ==
- Czech orienteers
- List of orienteers
- List of orienteering events
