= Veijo Tahvanainen =

Finnish orienteering competitor

Medal record

Men's orienteering

Representing Finland

World Championships
Silver medal – second place	1968 Linköping	Relay

Veijo Tahvanainen (born 27 September 1938 in Ilomantsi) is a Finnish orienteering competitor. He received a silver medal in the relay event and finished 10th in the individual event at the 1968 World Orienteering Championships in Linköping. In 1970 he finished 14th in the individual event, and 4th with the Finnish relay team. At the 1972 World Orienteering Championships in Staré Splavy, he placed 9th in the individual contest, and was part of the Swiss relay team (which was disqualified). He won the Jukola relay in 1967 and 1968.

== See also ==
- Finnish orienteers
- List of orienteers
- List of orienteering events
