= Claus Bloch =

Danish orienteering competitor

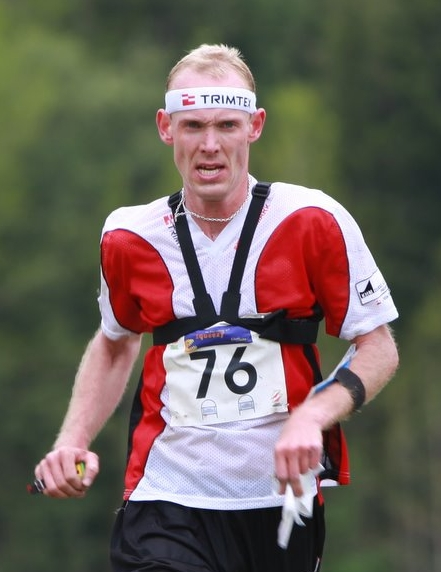
- Bloch at NOC 2009

Personal information
- Full name: Claus Hallingdal Bloch
- Nationality: Danish
- Born: 12 March 1977 (age 49)

Sport
- Sport: Orienteering
Medal record
Men's orienteering
Representing Denmark
World Championships
Bronze medal – third place	2006 Aarhus	Sprint

Claus Hallingdal Bloch (born 12 March 1977) is a Danish orienteering competitor. He received a bronze medal in the sprint event at the 2006 World Orienteering Championships in Aarhus, behind Emil Wingstedt and Daniel Hubmann. He participated on the Danish team that finished 8th at the 2006 World championship.

== See also ==
- Danish orienteers
- List of orienteers
- List of orienteering events
