= Simona Karochová =

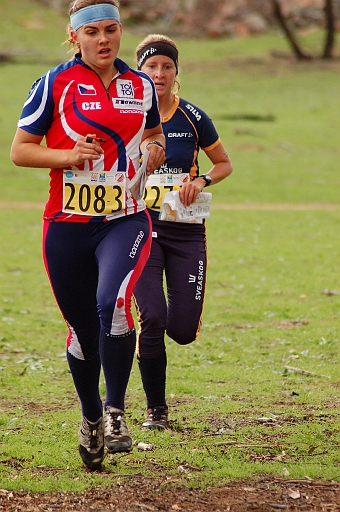

Personal information
- Born: 1988 (age 37–38)
Medal record
Representing Czech Republic
Women's Ski-orienteering
World Championships
Bronze medal – third place	2009 Rusutsu	Relay

Simona Karochová (born 1988) is a Czech orienteering and ski-orienteering competitor. She won a bronze medal in the relay event at the 2009 World Ski Orienteering Championships, with Barbora Chudíková and Helena Randáková.

== See also ==
- List of orienteers
- List of orienteering events
