= Jorma Karvonen =

Finnish ski-orienteer

Medal record

Representing Finland

Men's orienteering

World Championships
Bronze medal – third place	1978 Kongsberg	Relay

Men's ski orienteering

World Championships
Gold medal – first place	1975 Hyvinkää	Relay
Silver medal – second place	1975 Hyvinkää	Individual
Bronze medal – third place	1977 Velingrad	Individual

Jorma Karvonen (born 16 October 1949) is a Finnish ski-orienteering competitor and world champion. He won a gold medal at the first World Ski Orienteering Championships in Hyvinkää in 1975 in the relay event with the Finnish team (with Pekka Pökälä, Heimo Taskinen and Olavi Svanberg). He also received an individual silver medal in 1975, and a bronze medal at the 1977 World Championships in Avesta.

At the 1978 World Orienteering Championships in Kongsberg he won a bronze medal with the Finnish relay team.

== See also ==
- Finnish orienteers
- List of orienteers
- List of orienteering events
