= Howard Smith (designer) =

American-born Finnish artist and designer (1928–2021)

- Born: April 17, 1928; Moorestown, New Jersey, U.S.
- Died: February 4, 2021 (aged 92); Fiskars, Uusimaa, Finland
- Education: Pennsylvania Academy of the Fine Arts
- Occupations: Ceramicist, designer, multidisciplinary visual artist, educator
- Known for: Ceramics, textile design, sculpture, assemblage art, collage, quilts, paintings, silkscreen prints
- Spouse(s): Raili Hakulinen (m. 1965–1974, div.), Erna Aaltonen
- Children: 2
- Awards: Finnish State Prize for Design (2001)
- Website: howardsmith.info

Howard Smith (April 17, 1928 – February 4, 2021) was an American-born Finnish designer, ceramicist, multidisciplinary visual artist, and educator. Additionally he had worked a textile designer, sculptor, assemblage artist, collagist, quilter, painter, and serigrapher. Smith was one of only a handful of Black post-war designers, and his textiles and ceramics were produced by Scandinavia’s top design firms.

== Early life and education ==
Howard Smith was born on April 17, 1928, in Moorestown, New Jersey. Smith served from 1949 to 1958 in the United States Army, stationed in Europe. He attended the Pennsylvania Academy of the Fine Arts in Philadelphia from 1960 until 1962.

== Career ==
Smith's artwork felt out of place with the Black art world in the United States. In 1962, Smith was invited to participate in a cultural festival in Helsinki called, "Young America Presents", and unbeknownst to him hosted by the Central Intelligence Agency. He joined a community of designers and creatives in Finland, including Antti Nurmesniemi and Vuokko Nurmesniemi, Marimekko founder Armi Ratia, and architect Juhani Pallasmaa. In Finland, Smith was one of the only Black artists.

His first wife was Raili Hakulinen in 1965, together they had two children.

Smith worked producing houseware and textiles for the Vallila Interiors brand, and designed dishes and decorative ceramic sculptures for Arabia. While working at Arabia he met artist Erna Aaltonen, whom he would later marry.

In 1976, Smith moved to Los Angeles, with the support of Samella Lewis. While living in Los Angeles, he worked as a lecturer at Scripps College in Claremont. He returned to Finland in 1984.

From 1988 to 1995, Smith and Erna Aaltonen produced studio ceramics in Tervakoski under the name Arteos. The couple moved in 1996 to Fiskars, Uusimaa, Finland, and worked independently. In 2001, Smith was awarded the Finnish State Prize for Design.

== Death and legacy ==
Smith died at age 92 on February 4, 2021, in his home in Fiskars.

His work can be found in museum collections, including at the Los Angeles County Museum of Art (LACMA), the Espoo Museum of Modern Art, and at the Finnish National Gallery. A retrospective of his work, The Art and Design of Howard Smith (2025–2026), was held at the Palm Springs Art Museum in California.
