= Gun-Britt Nyberg =

Swedish orienteering competitor

Medal record

Women's orienteering

Representing Sweden

World Championships
Silver medal – second place	1968 Linköping	Relay

Gun-Britt Nyberg (born 8 March 1943) is a Swedish orienteering competitor. She received a silver medal in the relay event at the 1968 World Orienteering Championships in Linköping, together with Kerstin Granstedt and Ulla Lindkvist.
