= Eivor Steen-Olsson =

Swedish orienteering competitor (born 1937)

Medal record

Women's orienteering

Representing Sweden

World Championships
Gold medal – first place	1966 Fiskars	Relay
Gold medal – first place	1970 Friedrichroda	Relay

European Championships
Gold medal – first place	1964 Le Brassus	Relay

Eivor Steen-Olsson (born 5 January 1937) is a Swedish orienteering competitor. She is two times Relay World Champion as a member of the Swedish winning team in 1966 and 1970.

She won a gold medal in the first official relay at the European Orienteering Championships, in Le Brassus in 1964, together with Ann-Marie Wallsten and Ulla Lindkvist.

She competed at the very first World Orienteering Championships, in Fiskars in 1966, where she won a gold medal in the relay together with Kerstin Granstedt and Gunborg Åhling, and placed fifth in the individual contest.

At the 1970 World Orienteering Championships in Friedrichroda she won a gold medal in the relay for Sweden again, this time with Birgitta Larsson and Ulla Lindkvist.
