= Olavi Svanberg =

Finnish ski-orienteer

Medal record

Representing Finland

Men's ski orienteering

World Championships
Gold medal – first place	1975 Hyvinkää	Individual
Gold medal – first place	1975 Hyvinkää	Relay
Gold medal – first place	1982 Aigen	Individual
Silver medal – second place	1980 Avesta	Relay
Bronze medal – third place	1982 Aigen	Relay

Olavi Svanberg (December 10, 1941, Sysmä, Finland – August 25, 2002, Lake Ladoga, Russia) was a Finnish ski-orienteering competitor and world champion. He received an individual gold medal at the first World Ski Orienteering Championships in Hyvinkää in 1975, and also won the first gold medal in the relay event with the Finnish team (Pekka Pökälä, Heimo Taskinen, Jorma Karvonen and Olavi Svanberg). He was again world champion in 1982 in Aigen.

== See also ==
- Finnish orienteers
- List of orienteers
- List of orienteering events
