= Pekka Pökälä =

Finnish ski-orienteering competitor

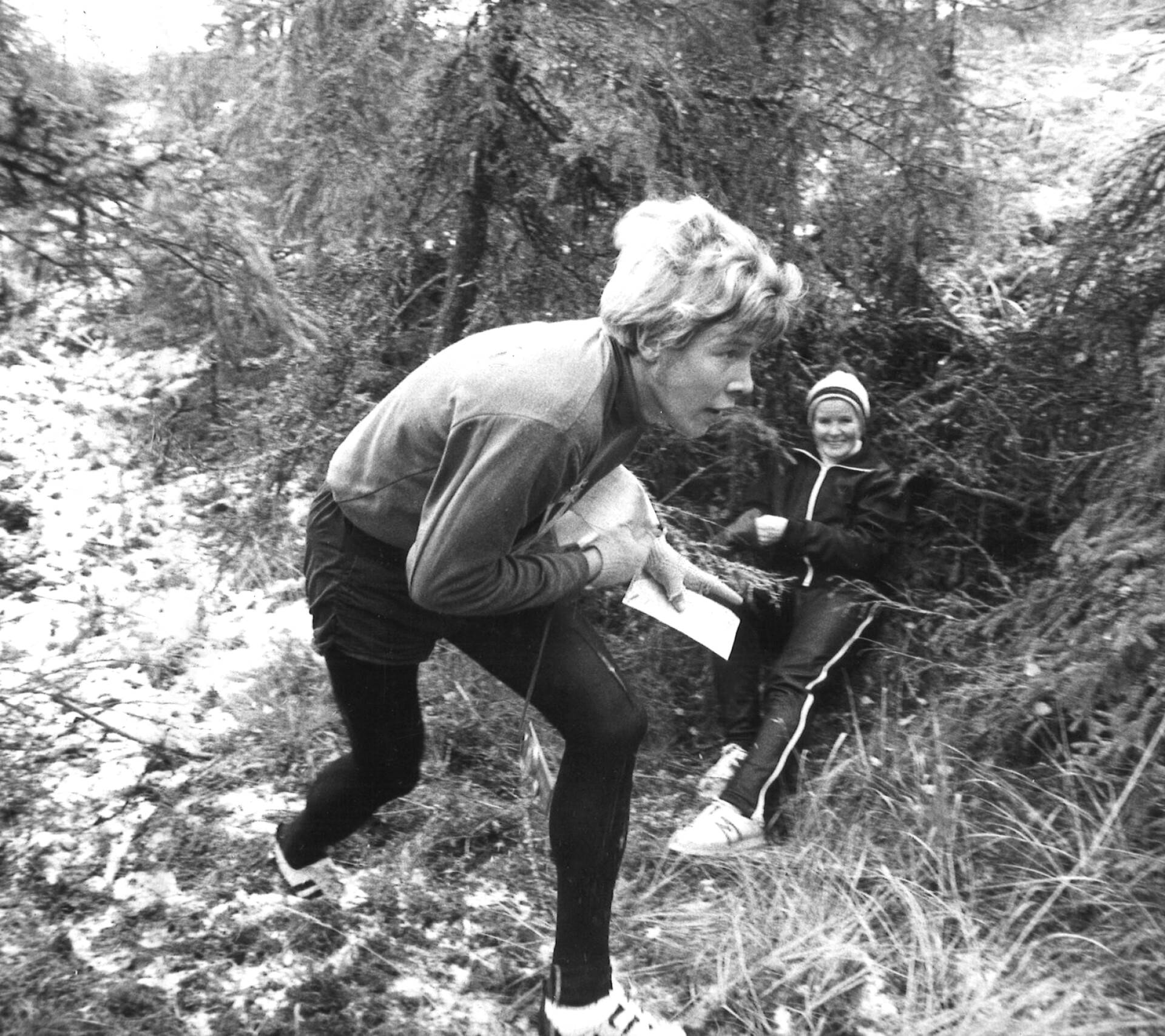

Medal record

Representing Finland

Men's ski orienteering

World Championships
Gold medal – first place	1975 Hyvinkää	Relay
Silver medal – second place	1977 Velingrad	Individual

Pekka Pökälä (born 29 January 1948 in Asikkala) is a Finnish ski-orienteering competitor and world champion. He won a gold medal at the first World Ski Orienteering Championships in Hyvinkää in 1975 in the relay event with the Finnish team (with Heimo Taskinen, Jorma Karvonen and Olavi Svanberg). He received an individual silver medal in 1977. He won the Jukola relay in 1968.

== See also ==
- Finnish orienteers
- List of orienteers
- List of orienteering events
