= Björn Nordin =

Swedish orienteering competitor

Medal record

Men's orienteering

Representing Sweden

World Championships
Silver medal – second place	1970 Friedrichroda	Relay

Björn Nordin is a Swedish orienteering competitor. He received a silver medal in the relay event at the 1970 World Orienteering Championships in Friedrichroda, together with Karl Johansson, Sture Björk and Bernt Frilén. He won the 1976 Jukola relay.
