= Kerstin Granstedt =

Swedish orienteer

Medal record

Women's orienteering

Representing Sweden

World Championships
Gold medal – first place	1966 Fiskars	Relay
Silver medal – second place	1968 Linköping	Relay
Bronze medal – third place	1968 Linköping	Individual

Kerstin Granstedt (born 27 December 1935) is a Swedish orienteering competitor. She became Relay World Champion in Fiskars in 1966, as a member of the Swedish winning team, with Eivor Steen-Olsson and Gunborg Åhling. She finished fourth in the individual event at these championships, which were the very first World Championships in Orienteering.

At the 1968 World Orienteering Championships in Linköping Granstedt won an individual bronze medal, and a silver medal in the relay event together with Gun-Britt Nyberg and Ulla Lindkvist.

Granstedt was the winner of the second edition of O-Ringen in 1966. She set the record for the margin of victory in the overall standings, winning by 20:58.
