= Per Fosser =

Norwegian orienteer (born 1945)

Personal information
- Nationality: Norwegian
- Relatives: Kasper Fosser (grandson)

Sport
- Sport: Orienteering
Medal record
Men's orienteering
Representing Norway
World Championships
Gold medal – first place	1970 Friedrichroda	Relay
Bronze medal – third place	1968 Linköping	Relay

Per Fosser (born 1945) is a Norwegian orienteering competitor. He is Relay World Champion from 1970, as a member of the Norwegian winning team, which consisted of Ola Skarholt, Stig Berge, Fosser and Åge Hadler. He won a bronze medal in the relay at the 1968 World Championships, again with Skarholt, Berge and Hadler on the team.

== Personal life ==
Fosser is grandfather of Kasper Fosser.
