= IL i BUL =

Norwegian sports club

- Full name: Idrottslaget i Bondeungdomslaget i Oslo
- Founded: 8 January 1913
- Ground: Bislett stadion Oslo

Idrottslaget i Bondeungdomslaget i Oslo (also BUL, Oslo) is a sports club in Oslo, Norway, founded on 8 January 1913. It is one of several branches of Bondeungdomslaget i Oslo, a local chapter of Noregs Mållag and Noregs Ungdomslag.

IL i BUL has sections for track and field athletics and skiing, and has previously been active in orienteering, football, and handball.

== Track and field ==
BUL is one of the leading track and field clubs in Norway. Well known athletes are the long-distance runners Ingrid Kristiansen (World Champion in 1987), Thor Helland, Knut Brustad, Øyvind Dahl and Moroccan citizens Khalid Skah (Olympic Champion in 1992) and Abderrahim Goumri. Sprinters include Jaysuma Saidy Ndure and Ezinne Okparaebo, jumpers include Hanne Haugland and Astrid Tveit, and throwers include Stein Haugen and Einar Kristian Tveitå.

In 1965 BUL co-formed Bislett-alliansen, together with two other sports clubs, IK Tjalve and SK Vidar, and since 1966 this group has organized the annual Bislett Games, an IAAF event.

== Orienteering ==
BUL, Oslo won the first Norwegian relay championship in Orienteering in 1946. They also won the men's relay in 1967, 1968, 1969, 1974 and 1975, and the women's relay in 1966, 1967, 1969, 1970, 1971 and 1972. Among the club's international orienteers are World Champions Åge Hadler, Ola Skarholt, Ingrid Hadler and Astrid Rødmyr.

== Skiing ==
Among the skiers who have competed for IL i BUL are cross-country skiers Johan Grøttumsbråten and Odd Martinsen, both Olympic champions and world champions; Bjarne Iversen; Henry Hermansen; and Heidi Weng; and ski jumper Sigurd Solid.

== Football ==
The football team was among the pioneers of women's football in Norway. The women's team played in the highest league in Norway as late as in 1991. It is now defunct.
