= Muneyoshi =

- Gender: Male

Origin
- Origin: Japanese
- Meaning: Different meanings depending on the kanji used

Muneyoshi is a masculine Japanese given name. Notable people with the name include:

- Tamura Muneyoshi (田村 宗良; 1637–1678), Japanese daimyō
- Muneyoshi Tokugawa (徳川 宗敬; 1897–1989), Japanese agricultural scholar
- Kotonofuji Muneyoshi (琴乃富士 宗義; born 1951), Japanese sumo wrestler

== See also ==
- Yagyū Munetoshi (柳生 宗厳; 1529–1606), Japanese samurai under the Tokugawa clan, whose name was misread by earlier scholars as Muneyoshi
