= 1968 World Orienteering Championships =

1968 edition of the World Orienteering Championships

- Host city: Linköping
- Country: Sweden
- Events: 4

The 2nd World Orienteering Championships were held in Linköping, Sweden, 28–29 September 1968.

The championships had four events; individual contests for men and women, and relays for men and women.

The men's individual course had 18 controls over 14.6 kilometres, while the women's individual course had 10 controls over 7.8 kilometres.

Swedish Television (SVT) broadcast the entire individual competition live. This was the first time ever orienteering was shown live on TV in Sweden, or in any other country in the world.

== Medalists ==
Event	Gold		Silver		Bronze	
Men's individual	Karl Johansson (SWE)	1:48:19	Sture Björk (SWE)	1:49:38	Åge Hadler (NOR)	1:50:13
Women's individual	Ulla Lindkvist (SWE)	1:04:55	Ingrid Hadler (NOR)	1:10:35	Kerstin Granstedt (SWE)	1:11:27
Men's relay	Sweden (SWE): Sture Björk; Karl Johansson; Sten-Olof Carlström; Göran Öhlund	4:25:19	Finland (FIN): Rolf Koskinen; Veijo Tahvanainen; Juhani Salmenkylä; Markku Salminen	4:25:28	Norway (NOR): Per Fosser; Ola Skarholt; Stig Berge; Åge Hadler	4:42:31
Women's relay	Norway (NOR): Astrid Rødmyr; Astrid Hansen; Ingrid Hadler	3:17:53	Sweden (SWE): Gun-Britt Nyberg; Kerstin Granstedt; Ulla Lindkvist	3:18:07	Finland (FIN): Pirjo Seppä; Tuula Hovi; Raila Kerkelä	3:42:15

== Results ==
=== Men's individual ===
WOC 1968 – Individual – Men (14.6 km)
Rank	Competitor	Nation	Time
1st place, gold medalist(s)	Karl Johansson	Sweden	1:48:19
2nd place, silver medalist(s)	Sture Björk	Sweden	1:49:38
3rd place, bronze medalist(s)	Åge Hadler	Norway	1:50:13
4	Juhani Salmenkylä	Finland	1:51:18
5	Ola Skarholt	Norway	1:51:48
6	Sten-Olof Carlström	Sweden	1:53:37
7	Jostein Nilsen	Norway	1:54:16
8	Stig Berge	Norway	1:54:32
9	Pauli Reunamäki	Finland	1:55:27
10	Veijo Tahvanainen	Finland	1:55:30

=== Women's individual ===
WOC 1968 – Individual – Women (7.8 km)
Rank	Competitor	Nation	Time
1st place, gold medalist(s)	Ulla Lindkvist	Sweden	1:04:55
2nd place, silver medalist(s)	Ingrid Hadler	Norway	1:10:35
3rd place, bronze medalist(s)	Kerstin Granstedt	Sweden	1:11:27
4	Pirjo Seppä	Finland	
5	Raila Kerkelä	Finland	
6	Vibeke Bøgevig	Denmark	
7	Jitenka Sevcikova	Czechoslovakia	
8	Birgitta Larsson	Sweden	
9	Inga-Britt Bengtsson	Sweden	
10	Astrid Rødmyr	Norway	
11	Tuula Hovi	Finland	
12	Katharina Mo	Norway	1:28:50
