= Katri Lindeqvist =

Finnish orienteer

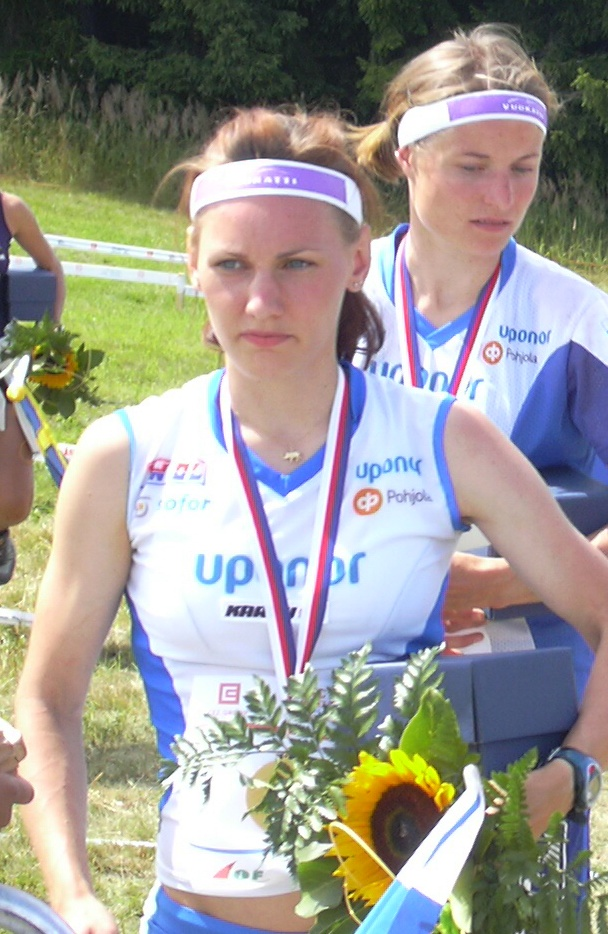
- Lindeqvist at WOC 2008

Medal record

Women's orienteering

Representing Finland

World Championships
Gold medal – first place	2008 Olomouc	Relay

European Championships
Bronze medal – third place	2008 Ventspils	Relay

Katri Lindeqvist (born 5 September 1980) is a Finnish orienteering competitor and world champion.

She received a gold medal in the relay at the 2008 World Orienteering Championships in Olomouc, together with Merja Rantanen and Minna Kauppi.

She participated on the Finnish team (with Merja Rantanen and Minna Kauppi) that achieved a bronze medal in the championship relay at the 2008 European Orienteering Championships in Ventspils.

== See also ==
- Finnish orienteers
- List of orienteers
- List of orienteering events
