= History of orienteering =

The history of orienteering begins in the late 19th century in Sweden, where it originated as military training. Over the course of the late 19th and early 20th centuries, orienteering emerged first as a military competition in Nordic countries and then as a mass participation sport, before becoming a competitive sport with an international governing body.

== Military exercise ==
The actual term "orienteering" (Swedish: orientering) was first used in 1886 at the Swedish Military Academy Karlberg and meant the crossing of unknown land with the aid of a map and a compass. The competitive sport began when the first competition was held for Swedish military officers on 28 May 1893 at the yearly games of the Stockholm garrison. The first civilian competition, in Norway on 31 October 1897, was sponsored by the Tjalve Sports Club and held near Oslo. The course was long by modern standards, at 19.5 km, on which only three controls were placed. The competition was won by Peder Fossum in a time of 1 hour, 47 minutes, and 7 seconds. The first public orienteering competition in Sweden was held in 1901.

== Orienteering as a mass participation sport ==
At the end of World War I the first large scale orienteering meet was organized in 1918 by Major Ernst Killander of Stockholm, Sweden. Then President of the Stockholm Amateur Athletic Association, Killander was a Scouting Movement leader who saw orienteering as an opportunity to interest youth in athletics. The meet was held south of Stockholm in 1919 and was attended by 220 athletes. Killander is credited with using the Swedish word orientering, from which the word orienteering is derived, in publicity materials for this meet. Killander continued to develop the rules and principles of the sport, and today is widely regarded throughout Scandinavia as the "Father of Orienteering".

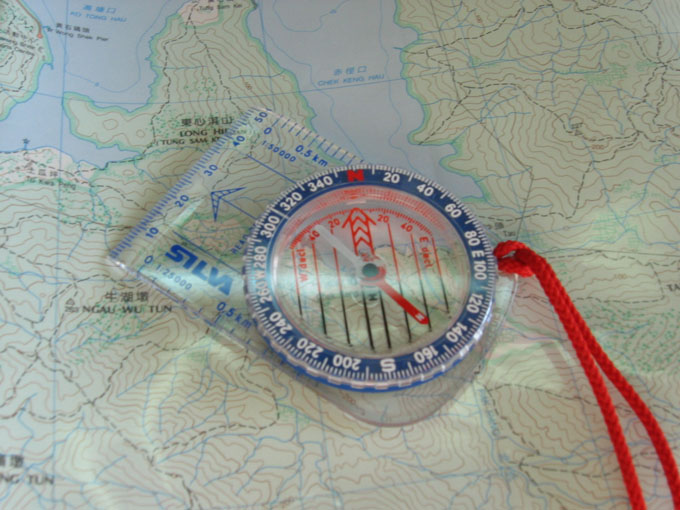
Protractor compass, first introduced in Sweden in 1933.

The sport gained popularity with the development of more reliable compasses in the 1930s. In 1928, Gunnar Tillander, a Swedish orienteer, invented a new style of bearing compass which allowed the user to quickly take bearings from a map. Tillander took his design to fellow orienteers Björn, Alvin, and Alvar Kjellström, who were selling basic compasses, and the four men modified Tillander's design and would go on to found Silva Sweden AB in 1932. In 1933, Silva introduced the protractor compass. Until the introduction of the thumb compass, the protractor compass would remain the state of the art in the sport.

The first international competition between orienteers of Sweden and Norway was held outside Oslo, Norway, in 1932. By 1934, over a quarter million Swedes were actively participating in the sport, and orienteering had spread to Finland, Switzerland, the Soviet Union and Hungary. The nations of Finland, Norway and Sweden all established national championships. The Swedish national orienteering society, Svenska Orienteringsförbundet, the first national orienteering society, was founded in 1936.

== Spread beyond Europe after World War II ==
Following World War II, orienteering spread beyond Scandinavia to Europe, North America, Oceania, and Asia. The sport became more popular as European orienteers traveled to other countries after the war and introduced it to new communities. Military groups also began using orienteering as a training method because it improved navigation skills, fitness, teamwork, and decision-making. This helped orienteering grow into an international sport.

In North America, the first orienteering event took place in the United States, at Dartmouth College in Hanover, New Hampshire, in November 1941. It was an orienteering activity that introduced the sport to participants in a structured way, using maps and compasses to follow a planned route. It was organized by Piltti Heiskanen, a visiting teacher from Finland. Swedish orienteer and business man Björn Kjellström, who moved to the United States in 1946, had a major influence on the sport there. In 1967, Norwegian Harald Wibye founded the first U.S. orienteering club, the Delaware Valley Orienteering Association, which 30 years later was the largest orienteering club in the United States. In 1971, a group of orienteers led by members of the then four-year-old Quantico Orienteering Club founded the United States Orienteering Federation.

The Canadian Orienteering Federation was founded in 1967, and the first Canadian national orienteering championship was held at Gatineau Park in Ottawa on August 10, 1968. The only World Championship to be held in North America took place at Harriman State Park, New York, USA, in 1993.

In Australia, the first orienteering event was held in 1955.

== Establishment as a world sport ==
The first international governing body for orienteering was the International Orienteering Federation, which was formed by Bulgaria, Czechoslovakia, Denmark, East Germany, Finland, Hungary, Norway, Sweden, Switzerland and West Germany in 1961.

Eleven countries sent representatives to an international conference in Sandviken, Sweden, in 1949 that aimed to bring more consistent rules and mapping standards to the sport. The Norwegians and Swedes began producing new multi-color maps with cartography designed specifically for orienteering, in the 1950s. The International Orienteering Federation (IOF) was established in 1961 and the first world championships were held in 1966. By 1969, the IOF would represent 16 countries, including the first two non-European member societies representing Japan and Canada.

Eighty different national orienteering federations are member societies of the IOF today. World championships were held biannually from 1961 to 2003, and are now held every year.
