= Astrid Rødmyr =

Norwegian orienteer (born 1940)

Medal record

Women's orienteering

Representing Norway

World Championships
Gold medal – first place	1968 Linköping	Relay
Bronze medal – third place	1970 Eisenach	Relay

Astrid Vigenstad (married name Rødmyr; 30 March 1940 – 9 April 2021) was a Norwegian orienteering competitor and World champion.

== Orienteering career ==
Competing for the club IL i BUL from the mid 1960s, Vigenstad (named Rødmyr for a period) won national titles in relay with this club in 1966 and 1967.

She won a gold medal in the 1968 World Orienteering Championships with the Norwegian Relay team, along with Astrid Hansen and Ingrid Hadler, and placed 10th in the individual contest. She won a bronze medal in the relay in the 1970 World Orienteering Championships, along with Kristin Danielsen and Ingrid Hadler.

In 1971 she competed in the Nordic championships in Sundsvall, where she was part of the winning Norwegian relay team.

A member of Lillehammer OK for 45 years, Vigenstad regularly competed in the World Masters Orienteering Championships from 1996, winning a silver medal in Canada in 2005, and another silver medal in Portugal in 2008.

== Personal life ==
Astrid Vigenstad hailed from Dovre Municipality, and settled as schoolteacher in Lillehammer Municipality from the mid 1970s. She had married Asbjørn Rødmyr in 1967. Their marriage did not last, but her world championship title was taken under the name Rødmyr.

Vigenstad (Rødmyr) died on 9 April 2021, 81 years old.
