= Valborg Madslien =

Norwegian orienteer

Medal record

Representing Norway

Women's Ski-orienteering

World Championships
Silver medal – second place	1994 Val di Non	Relay
Bronze medal – third place	1998 Windischgarsten	Relay

Valborg Olive Engesæter Madslien (born 1 July 1973) is a Norwegian ski-orienteering competitor.

She competed at the 1994 World Ski Orienteering Championships in Val di Non and won a silver medal with the Norwegian relay team, which consisted of herself, Anne Marit Korsvold and Hilde Gjermundshaug Pedersen.

At the 1998 World Ski Orienteering Championships in Windischgarsten she won a bronze medal with the Norwegian relay team, which consisted of herself, Hanne Sletner and Hilde Gjermundshaug Pedersen.

Madslien is four times Norwegian champion in ski orienteering (twice individual champion and twice on relay). She was awarded the Kongepokal (King's Cup) trophy at the national championships in 1999.

She resides in Lillehammer.
