= Leena Silvennoinen =

Finnish orienteer

Medal record

Women's orienteering

Representing Finland

World Championships
Gold medal – first place	1979 Tampere	Relay

Leena Silvennoinen (born 7 March 1958) is a Finnish orienteering competitor and world champion.

She won a gold medal in the relay event at the 1979 World Orienteering Championships in Tampere, with Leena Salmenkylä and Liisa Veijalainen on the Finnish relay team.

== See also ==
- Finnish orienteers
- List of orienteers
- List of orienteering events
