= Gunnar Öhlund =

Swedish orienteering competitor

Medal record

Men's orienteering

Representing Sweden

World Championships
Gold medal – first place	1974 Silkeborg	Relay

Gunnar Öhlund (born 9 August 1947) is a Swedish orienteering competitor. He is Relay World Champion from 1974, as a member of the Swedish winning team. His brother, Goran Öhlund is a former World Orienteering Champion. His son, Erik Öhlund competed on the 2008 Swedish Orienteering Team. He currently is a farmer in Ulricehamn, Sweden.
