= Øystein Kvaal Østerbø =

Norwegian orienteer (born 1981)

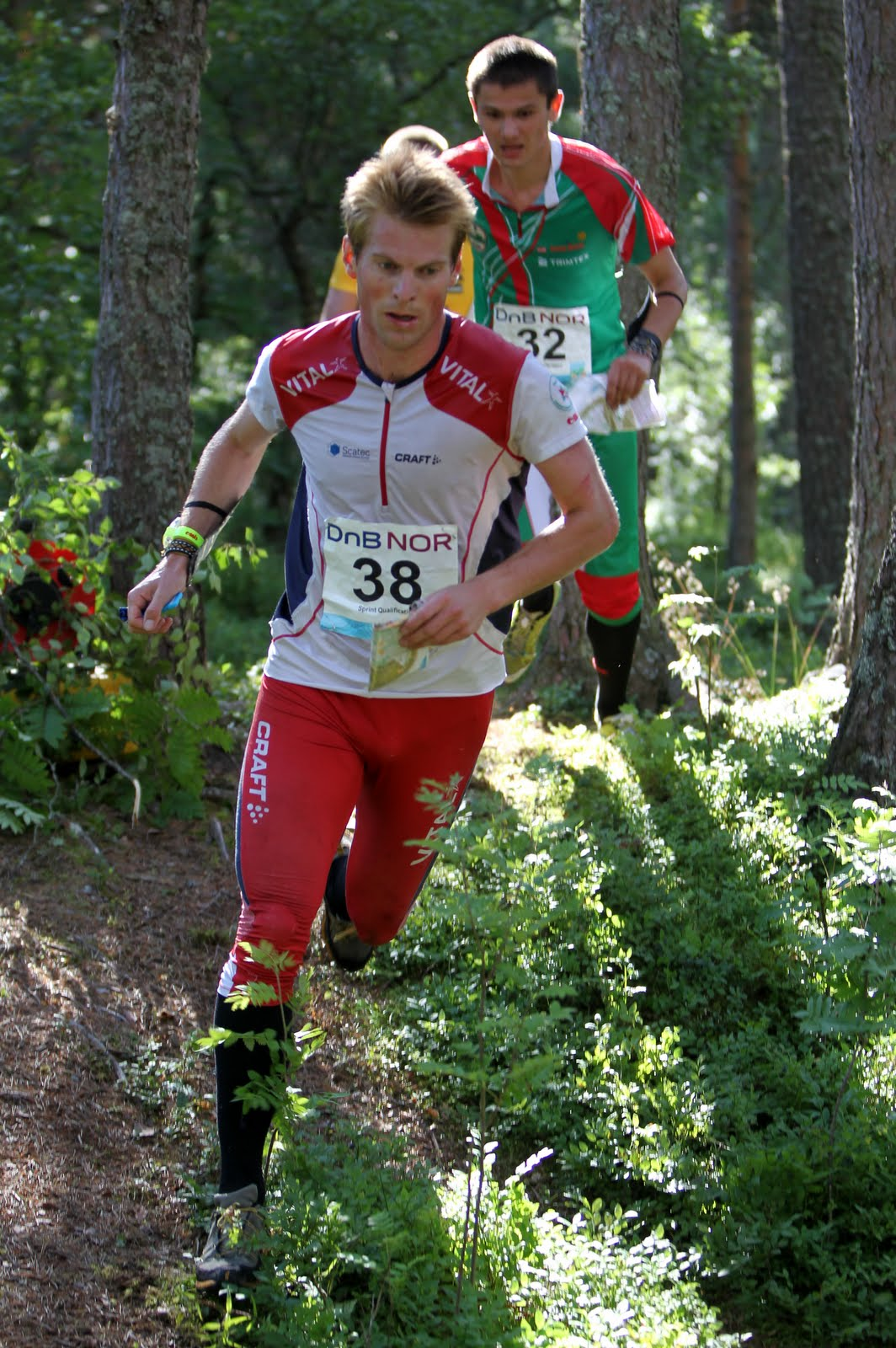

Personal information
- Born: 7 July 1981 (age 44) Trondheim, Norway

Sport
- Sport: Orienteering; Ski orienteering
- Club: IFK Lidingö; Bækkelagets SK
Medal record
Representing Norway
Men's orienteering
World Championships
Silver medal – second place	2015 Inverness	Sprint Relay
Silver medal – second place	2015 Inverness	Relay
World Cup
Bronze medal – third place	2004	WC Overall
World Games
Bronze medal – third place	2009 Kaohsiung	Mixed Relay
European Championships
Bronze medal – third place	2006 Otepää	Relay
Bronze medal – third place	2018 Cadempino	Mixed sprint relay
Men's ski-orienteering
World Championships
Silver medal – second place	2004 Östersund	Relay

Øystein Kvaal Østerbø (born 7 July 1981) is a Norwegian orienteering and ski-orienteering competitor. He finished overall third in the Orienteering World Cup in 2004, and won a silver medal in the relay in the 2004 World Ski Orienteering Championships. He has competed in all fifteen World Orienteering Championships since his debut in 2004 until 2018, obtaining his first two medals in Inverness in 2015; in the relay and mixed sprint relay, respectively. His best individual achievements are fourth places in the sprint in 2005 and 2010.

== World cup, orienteering ==
Østerbø finished third overall at the 2004 Orienteering World Cup, with a total score of 207 points (same score as Russian Andrey Khramov who finished second). He was ranked 7th in the World Cup 2005.

== European championships ==
He received a bronze medal in relay at the European Orienteering Championships in 2006 in Otepää.

In 2008 in Ventspils he made a small mistake that cost him the medal in the sprint distance, where he finished 8th but missed the bronze medal by only eleven seconds.

== National championships ==
He became Norwegian champion in night orienteering in 2006.

== Ski orienteering ==
Østerbø participated on the Norwegian team that received a silver medal at the World Ski Orienteering Championships in 2004, together with Anders Hauge, Eivind Tonna and Tommy Olsen. At this championship he finished 8th in the sprint distance and 6th in the middle distance.
