= Kaija Silvennoinen =

Finnish ski orienteering competitor (born 1954)

Medal record

Representing Finland

Women's ski-orienteering

World Championships
| Gold medal – first place | 1977 Velingrad | Relay |
| Gold medal – first place | 1980 Avesta | Relay |
| Silver medal – second place | 1980 Avesta | Individual |
| Silver medal – second place | 1984 Lavarone | Relay |

Kaija Silvennoinen (née Halonen; born May 5, 1954) is a Finnish ski orienteering competitor. At the World Ski Orienteering Championships in 1977 in Velingrad, Bulgaria, she won a gold medal in the relay, with Aila Flöjt and Sinikka Kukkonen, and placed fourth in the individual contest. At the World Ski Orienteering Championships in 1980 she won a gold medal with the Finnish relay team, together with Mirja Puhakka and Sinikka Kukkonen, and a silver medal in the individual contest.

== See also ==
- Finnish orienteers
- List of orienteers
- List of orienteering events
