= Holger Hott =

Norwegian orienteer (born 1974)

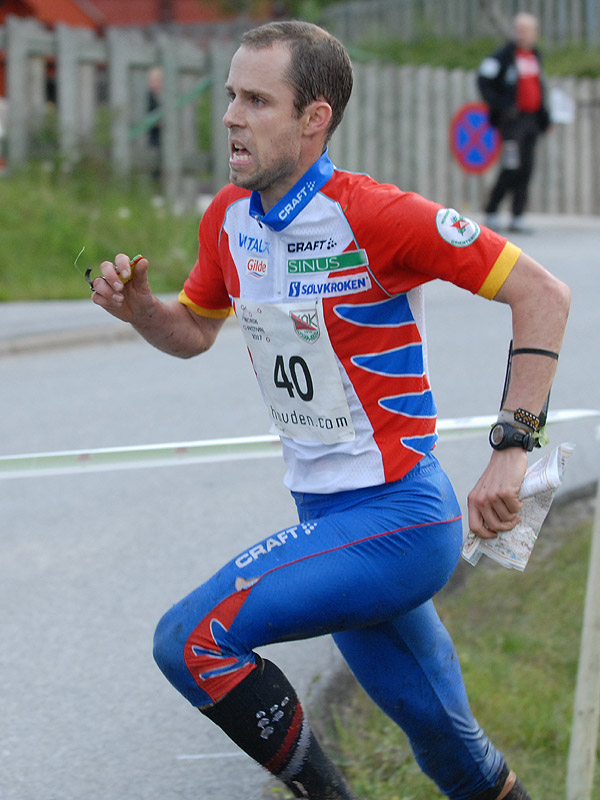
- Hott at the World Cup event in Norway 2007

Medal record

Men's orienteering

Representing Norway

World Championships
| Gold medal – first place | 2005 Aichi | Relay |
| Gold medal – first place | 2006 Aarhus | Middle |
| Bronze medal – third place | 2004 Västerås | Long |
| Bronze medal – third place | 2005 Aichi | Long |

European Championships
| Bronze medal – third place | 2010 Primorsko | Relay |

Junior World Championships
| Silver medal – second place | 1993 Kastelruth | Relay |
| Silver medal – second place | 1994 Gdynia | Middle |

Holger Hott, formerly Holger Hott Johansen, (born 8 April 1974) is a Norwegian orienteering competitor who has won two individual long-distance bronze medals in the World Championships in 2004 and 2005. He was part of Norway's relay team that took gold in the World Championships in Japan in 2005. He also won the overall world cup in 2004.

In August 2006 he won his first individual World Championship title when he took gold in the middle distance at the World Championships in Århus, Denmark.

He competes for Kristiansand Orienteering Club, and was formerly with IF Trauma, IL Express, IL Imås, IFK Lidingö, Bækkelaget Sportsklubb. He won Jukola relay in 1999 and 2009.

He is also a civil engineer, specialising in acoustics.

He is married to the Canadian orienteerer Sandy Hott (née Smith). In the spring of 2007 they decided to change their surnames from Hott Johansen merely to Hott, to make it simple and easy to spell. They had thought of this name change for a while, and finally decided to do it before their first son was born in June 2007.

== Titles ==
- World Championship gold – middle distance, 2006
- World Championship gold – relay, 2005
- World Championship bronze – long distance, 2004 and 2005
- World Cup – relay 2004
- Nordic Masters silver – middle distance 2003 and 2005
- Nordic Masters bronze – middle distance 2001, bronze long distance 2005
- National Championships individual – 4 gold, 3 silver, 1 bronze
- National Championships relay – 4 gold, 1 silver, 2 bronze
