= Leena Salmenkylä =

Finnish orienteer

Medal record

Women's orienteering

Representing Finland

World Championships
| Gold medal – first place | 1979 Tampere | Relay |

Leena Salmenkylä (born 13 March 1958) is a Finnish orienteering competitor and world champion.

She won a gold medal in the relay event at the 1979 World Orienteering Championships in Tampere, with Leena Silvennoinen and Liisa Veijalainen on the Finnish relay team.

== See also ==
- Finnish orienteers
- List of orienteers
- List of orienteering events
