= Tommy Olsen (orienteer) =

Norwegian orienteer (born 1967)

Medal record

Representing Norway

Men's ski orienteering

World Championships
Silver medal – second place	2004 Åsarna/Östersund	Relay
Silver medal – second place	2004 Åsarna/Östersund	Middle
Bronze medal – third place	2004 Åsarna/Östersund	Long

Tommy Olsen (born 17 February 1967) is a Norwegian ski-orienteering competitor. He received three medals at the 2004 World Ski Orienteering Championships in Östersund, a silver medal in the middle distance, a bronze medal in the long distance, and a silver medal in the relay (with Øystein Kvaal Østerbø, Anders Hauge and Eivind Tonna). He is two time national champion.
