= Ola Skarholt =

Norwegian orienteer (1939–2017)

Personal information
- Born: 30 November 1939
- Died: 18 June 2017 (aged 77) Asker
- Occupation: Engineer
- Education: Norwegian Institute of Technology

Sport
- Sport: Orienteering
- Club: SK Freidig; IL i BUL (1965–)

Achievements and titles
- National finals: Norwegian champion 1965
Medal record
Men's orienteering
Representing Norway
World Championships
Gold medal – first place	1970 Friedrichroda	Relay
Bronze medal – third place	1966 Fiskars	Relay
Bronze medal – third place	1968 Linköping	Relay

Ola Skarholt (30 November 1939 – 18 June 2017), was a Norwegian orienteering competitor. He became Relay World Champion in 1970 as a member of the Norwegian winning team, which also consisted of Stig Berge, Per Fosser and Åge Hadler. Skarholt placed fourth in the individual contest.

He also won bronze medals in the relay in the 1966 and 1968 World Orienteering Championships.

Skarholt represented the clubs SK Freidig and IL i BUL. His results at the Norwegian Orienteering Championships include an individual gold medal in 1965.

Skarholt was educated at the Norwegian Institute of Technology, and worked as engineer in the electric power industry. His last job before retirement was a fourteen-year stint as managing director of Lier Electricity Works. He died in Asker on 18 June 2017, 77 years old.
