= Aimo Tepsell =

Finnish orienteering competitor (born 1932)

Medal record

Men's orienteering

Representing Finland

World Championships
Silver medal – second place	1966 Fiskars	Individual
Silver medal – second place	1966 Fiskars	Relay

European Championships
Bronze medal – third place	1964 Le Brassus	Individual

Aimo Tepsell (8 May 1932 – 30 June 2017) was a Finnish orienteering competitor. He received two silver medals at the 1966 World Orienteering Championships. He also received a bronze medal at the 1964 Euoropean championship.

== See also ==
- Finnish orienteers
- List of orienteers
- List of orienteering events
