= Eivind Tonna =

Norwegian orienteer (born 1975)

Medal record

Men's ski orienteering

World Championships
Silver medal – second place	2004 Åsarna/Östersund	Relay

Eivind Lühr Tonna (born 19 February 1975) is a Norwegian ski-orienteering competitor. He received a silver medal in the relay event at the 2004 World Ski Orienteering Championships in Östersund, together with Øystein Kvaal Østerbø, Tommy Olsen and Anders Hauge. He finished 12th in the middle distance and 6th in the sprint distance at the 2004 world championships.

He also won a silver medal at the 2010 Winter Military World Games.

Tonna is a double national champion in ski orienteering.
