= Gunborg Åhling =

Swedish orienteering competitor

Medal record

Women's orienteering

Representing Sweden

World Championships
| Gold medal – first place | 1966 Fiskars | Relay |

Gunborg Åhling (born 16 July 1936) is a Swedish orienteering competitor. She competed at the very first World Orienteering Championships, in Fiskars in 1966, where she won a gold medal in the relay together with Kerstin Granstedt and Eivor Steen-Olsson, and placed tenth in the individual contest.
