= Sandy Hott =

Canadian orienteer

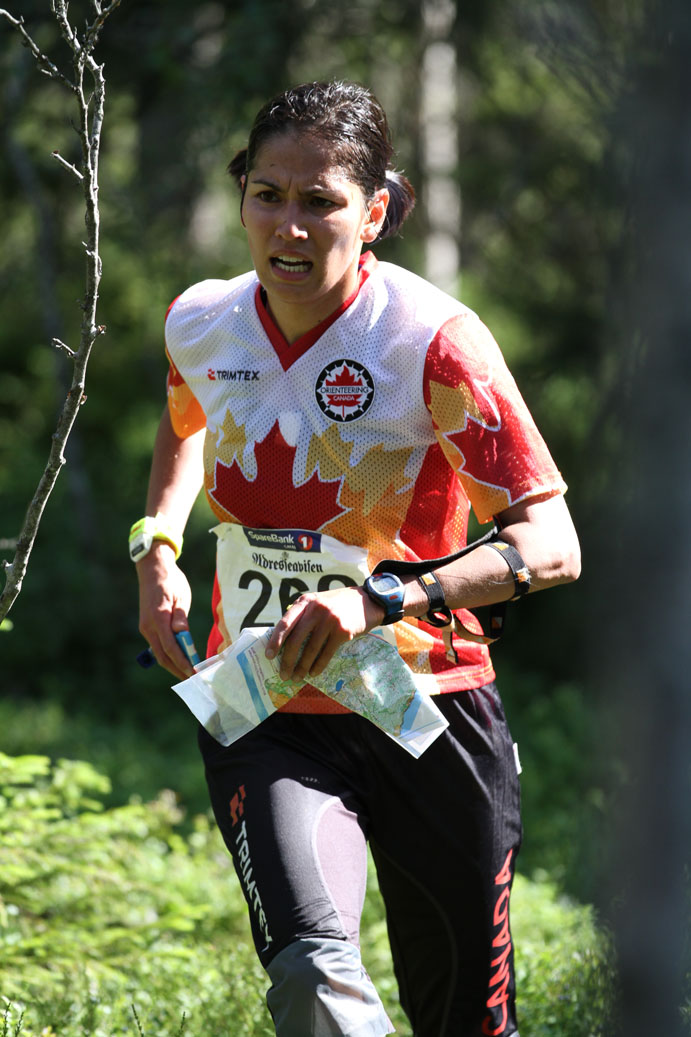
- Sandy Hott at WOC 2010

Personal information
- Nationality: Canadian
- Born: Alexandra Smith; 1974 (age 51–52)
- Spouse: Holger Hott

Sport
- Sport: Orienteering
- Club: Falcon OC; Kristiansand OK

Achievements and titles
- World finals: 1997, 1999, 2001, 2003, 2004, 2005, 2006, 2008 2010

Sandy Hott (née Alexandra Smith; born 1974) is a Canadian physician and orienteering competitor. During her active career, she became North American and Canadian Champion, and represented Canada in 22 events at nine World Orienteering Championships between 1997 and 2010. As of 2009, she was the highest placed competitor ever from the North American continent at the World Orienteering Championships.

== Personal life ==
Sandy Smith grew up in New Brunswick as the daughter of psychiatrist Edwin Smith and emergency medicine physician Luella Smith. Her brothers Wil and Mike, and sisters Heather and Victoria have all represented the Canadian team at the World Championships. She studied medicine at Dalhousie University, and later moved to Kristiansand, Norway where she worked as a physician. She is married to Norwegian orienteer Holger Hott, and their son was born in June 2007.

== Orienteering career ==
Sandy Hott represents the Canadian club Falcon OC, and the Norwegian club Kristiansand OK, and former Bækkelagets SK. She has been North American and Canadian champion, becoming Canadian Champion in the short distance in 1996, and in the classic distance in 1998 and 2000, and North American Champion in 1998. She competed for Canada at all seven World Orienteering Championships from 1997 to 2006. Her best placement at the World Championships was in Japan in 2005, when she placed ninth in the middle distance. This result was the best ever placement at the World Orienteering Championships by a person from the North American continent. In 2007, she gave birth to a son, and in Olomouc in 2008 she again represented Canada at the World Championships, being in the finals of both the long and middle distances. In 2008 in addition to Sandy also her two brothers Wil and Mike, as well as her two sisters Heather and Victoria, all participated at the World Championships. Hott also participated on the Canadian relay team at the 2010 World Orienteering Championships in Trondheim.
