= Ernst Killander =

Swedish orienteer

Ernst Killander (10 March 1882 – 24 January 1958), a Swedish Major in the First World War, was one of the people who made the sport of orienteering popular in Scandinavian countries.

Killander was a vegetarian. He was President of the Swedish Vegetarian Society and attended the International Vegetarian Union Congress in 1953.

== See also ==
- History of orienteering
