= Kajsa Nilsson =

Swedish orienteering competitor

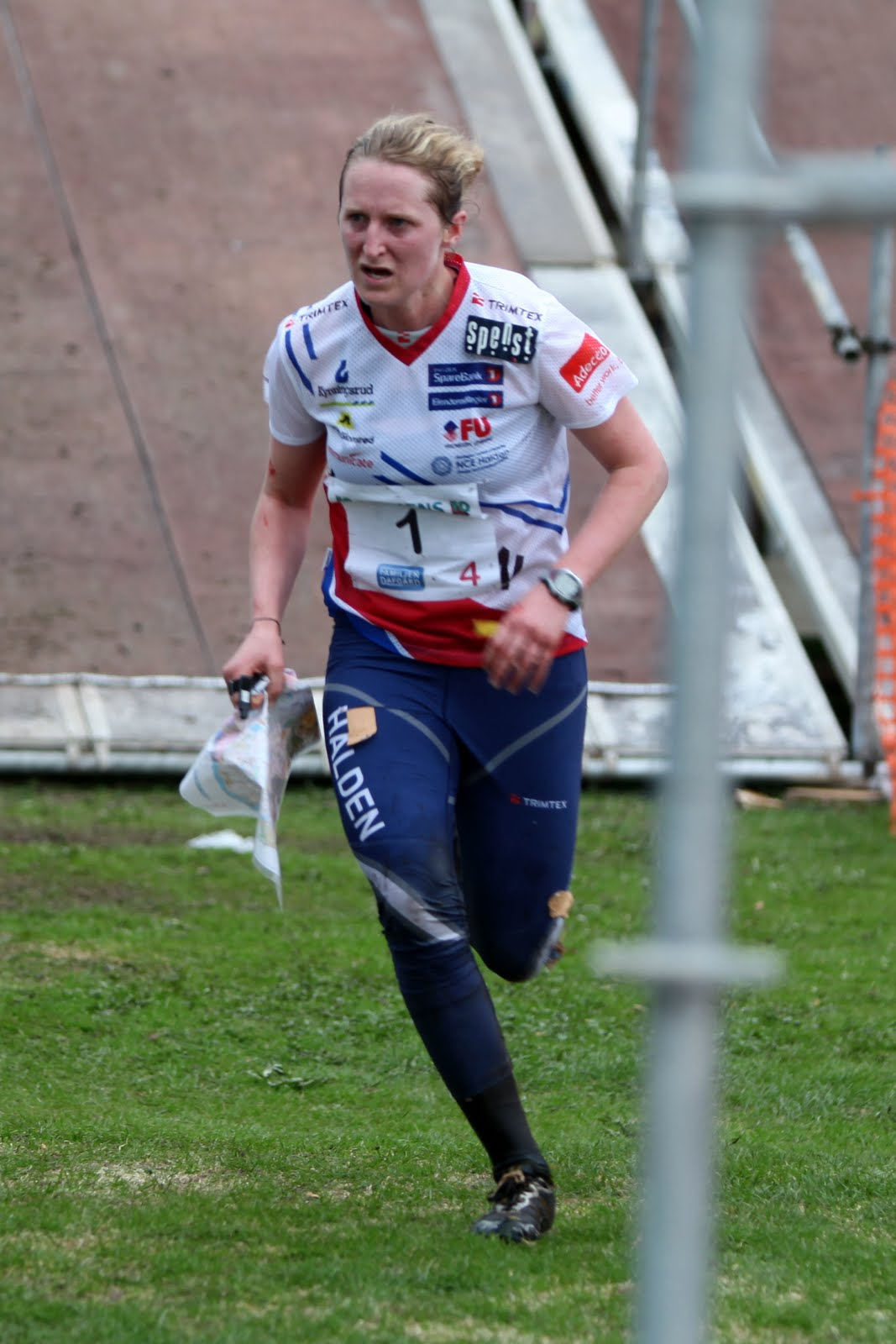
- Nilsson in 2010

Medal record

Women's orienteering

Representing Sweden

World Championships
Silver medal – second place	2006 Aarhus	Relay
Silver medal – second place	2009 Miskolc	Relay
Bronze medal – third place	2006 Aarhus	Sprint

European Championships
Bronze medal – third place	2006 Otepää	Relay

Junior World Championships
Gold medal – first place	2001 Miskolc	Relay
Bronze medal – third place	2001 Miskolc	Middle distance

Open Nordic Championships
Gold medal – first place	2006 Bornholm	Relay

Kajsa Nilsson (born 9 February 1982) is a Swedish orienteering competitor. She received a silver medal in the relay event and a bronze medal in the sprint distance at the 2006 World Orienteering Championships in Aarhus.
