= Ingrid Hadler =

Norwegian orienteer (born 1946)

Personal information
- Born: Ingrid Thoresen; 12 February 1946 (age 80) Trondheim, Norway
- Spouse: Åge Hadler
- Relative: Petter Thoresen (nephew)

Sport
- Sport: Orienteering
- Club: SK Freidig; IL i BUL
Medal record
Women's orienteering
Representing Norway
World Championships
Gold medal – first place	1968 Linköping	Relay
Gold medal – first place	1970 Eisenach	Individual
Silver medal – second place	1968 Linköping	Individual
Silver medal – second place	1974 Silkeborg	Relay
Bronze medal – third place	1966 Fiskars	Relay
Bronze medal – third place	1970 Eisenach	Relay

Ingrid Hadler (born Ingrid Thoresen; 12 February 1946) is a former orienteering competitor and cross-country skier from Norway. She is individual world champion in orienteering, as well as relay champion.

== Career ==
Hadler had her breakthrough in orienteering in 1965, when she became Nordic champion.

She competed for Norway at the very first World Orienteering Championships in 1966 in Fiskars, where she placed sixth in the individual race, and won a bronze medal with the Norwegian relay team.

She won an individual silver medal at the 1968 World Orienteering Championships in Linköping, where she also won the gold medal in the relay, along with Astrid Rødmyr and Astrid Hansen. She won the 1970 Individual World Orienteering Championships in Eisenach, as well as winning a bronze medal in the relay. At the 1972 World Orienteering Championships she placed fifth in the individual contest, and seventh in the relay. She won the silver medal in the relay at the 1974 World Orienteering Championships with the Norwegian team.

She is co-author of the book På tvers av stiene: Med giftering, kort og kompass (1970) with her husband Åge Hadler.

== Personal life ==
Hadler was born in Trondheim as Ingrid Thoresen on 12 February 1946, a daughter of Odd Thoresen and Solveig Henriksen. She married Åge Hadler in 1968.

She is aunt of orienteering world champion Petter Thoresen.
