= Arlinda Dudaj (Hovi) =

Albanian publisher

Arlinda Dudaj (born 7 October 1977 in Tirana) is an Albanian publisher who currently serves as the president of "Dudaj" Publishing House. She is the co-founder of the "Albanian Book Association" along with Ardian Klosi and presently serves as the organization's chairwoman.
