= Anders Hauge =

Norwegian orienteer (born 1975)

Medal record

Representing Norway

Men's ski orienteering

World Championships
Silver medal – second place	2004 Åsarna/Östersund	Relay

Anders Hauge (born 1975) is a Norwegian ski-orienteering competitor. He received a silver medal in the relay event at the 2004 World Ski Orienteering Championships in Östersund, together with Øystein Kvaal Østerbø, Tommy Olsen and Eivind Tonna. He placed 11th in the long distance, 8th in the middle distance, and 14th in the sprint at the 2004 World Championships. He competed at the 2005 World Championships in Levi, and placed 15th in the sprint and sixth in the relay.

Hauge is 6 times individual national champion in ski orienteering. He is also 9 times national champion in ski orienteering, relay, representing Asker skiklubb.
