= Astrid Hansen =

Norwegian orienteer

Personal information
- Born: 1933
- Died: 21 August 2022 (aged 89)

Sport
- Sport: Orienteering
Medal record
Women's orienteering
Representing Norway
World Championships
Gold medal – first place	1968 Linköping	Relay
Bronze medal – third place	1966 Fiskars	Relay

Astrid Hansen (1933 – 2022) was a Norwegian orienteering competitor and World champion.

== Sports career ==
Hansen won a gold medal in the 1968 World Orienteering Championships with the Norwegian relay team (Astrid Rødmyr, Hansen and Ingrid Hadler). She received a bronze medal in the relay in 1966.

She was awarded the Kongepokal (King's Cup) trophy in 1966, winning the individual national title at the Norwegian orienteering championships in Hatlestrand.

Hansen died on 21 August 2022, 89 years old.
