= Pirjo Seppä =

Finnish orienteer

Medal record

Women's orienteering

Representing Finland

World Championships
Gold medal – first place	1972 Doksy	Relay
Silver medal – second place	1972 Doksy	Individual
Bronze medal – third place	1968 Linköping	Relay

Pirjo Seppä (born 8 February 1946 in Virolahti) is a Finnish orienteering competitor and World Champion. She participated on the Finnish winning team in the 1972 World Orienteering Championships, and also won a silver medal in the individual contest.

Seppä was member of the team that won bronze medals in the relay in the 1968 World Orienteering Championships. She competed in the 1970 World Orienteering Championships, where she placed fourth in the individual contest.

== See also ==
- Finnish orienteers
- List of orienteers
- List of orienteering events
