= Bertil Norman =

Swedish orienteering competitor (1929–2023)

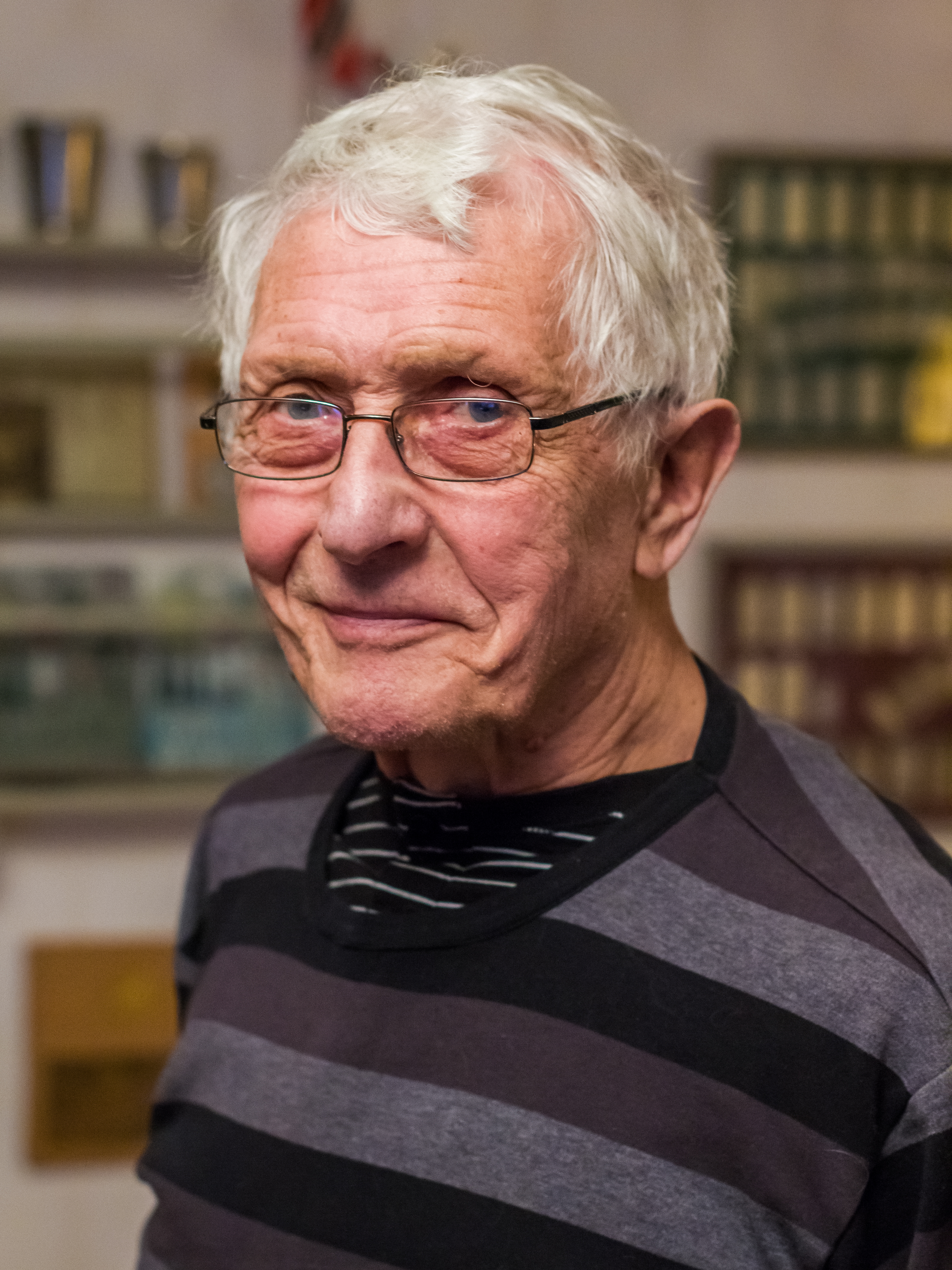
- Norman in 2015

Medal record

Men's orienteering

Representing Sweden

World Championships
Gold medal – first place	1966 Fiskars	Relay

Bertil Norman (29 June 1929 – 24 March 2023) was a Swedish orienteering competitor. He is Relay World Champion from 1966, as a member of the Swedish winning team.

Norman was a top level orienteer in the 1950s and 1960s. He obtained an individual silver medal in the 1962 European Championships, as well as relay bronze in 1964. He was three times elected "Årets orienterare" (Orienteer of the Year) in Sweden, in 1961, 1962 and 1964. He is several times Swedish Champion: 1947 (Long distance), 1952 (Relay), 1959 (Relay), 1961 (Long distance, and Night Orienteering), 1962 (Night Orienteering), 1963 (Relay), and 1968 (Night Orienteering).

Norman died on 24 March 2023, at the age of 93.
