= Hanne Sletner =

Norwegian orienteer (born 1972)

Medal record

Representing Norway

Women's ski-orienteering

World Championships
| Bronze medal – third place | 1998 Windischgarsten | Relay |

Hanne Sletner (born 27 August 1972) is a retired Norwegian ski-orienteering competitor.

At the 1998 World Ski Orienteering Championships in Windischgarsten she won a bronze medal with the Norwegian relay team, which consisted of herself, Valborg Madslien and Hilde Gjermundshaug Pedersen, and she finished 8th in the short and 13th in the classic course.
