= Anders Morelius =

Swedish orienteering competitor

Medal record

Men's orienteering

Representing Sweden

World Championships
Gold medal – first place	1966 Fiskars	Relay
Bronze medal – third place	1966 Fiskars	Individual

Anders Morelius (born 20 March 1940) is a Swedish orienteering competitor. He is Relay World Champion from 1966, as a member of the Swedish winning team in the very first World Orienteering Championships, held in Fiskars, Finland. He also earned a bronze medal in the 1966 Individual World Orienteering Championship. Han also won 10-mila representing OK Malmia in 1965.
