= Ulla Lindkvist =

Swedish orienteering competitor

Personal information
- Born: 30 August 1939
- Died: 6 August 2015 (aged 75)
Medal record
Women's orienteering
Representing Sweden
World Championships
Gold medal – first place	1966 Fiskars	Individual
Gold medal – first place	1968 Linköping	Individual
Gold medal – first place	1970 Friedrichroda	Relay
Silver medal – second place	1968 Linköping	Relay
Silver medal – second place	1970 Friedrichroda	Individual
Silver medal – second place	1972 Doksy	Relay
European Championships
Gold medal – first place	1962 Løten	Individual
Gold medal – first place	1962 Løten	Relay
Gold medal – first place	1964 Le Brassus	Relay
Bronze medal – third place	1964 Le Brassus	Individual

Ulla Lindkvist (30 August 1939 – 6 August 2015) was a Swedish orienteering competitor, and the first individual female world champion in this sport. She won the 1966 and 1968 Individual World Orienteering Championships, and finished second 1970. She became Relay World Champion in 1970 as a member of the Swedish team (together with Birgitta Larsson and Eivor Steen-Olsson). She also participated on the teams that obtained silver medals in 1968 and 1972.

Lindkvist holds the record for the number of overall O-Ringen victories, and number of O-Ringen wins in a row, winning eight in a row from 1967 to 1974.
