= Fiskars, Finland =

Fiskars Fiskari (Finnish)
- Village
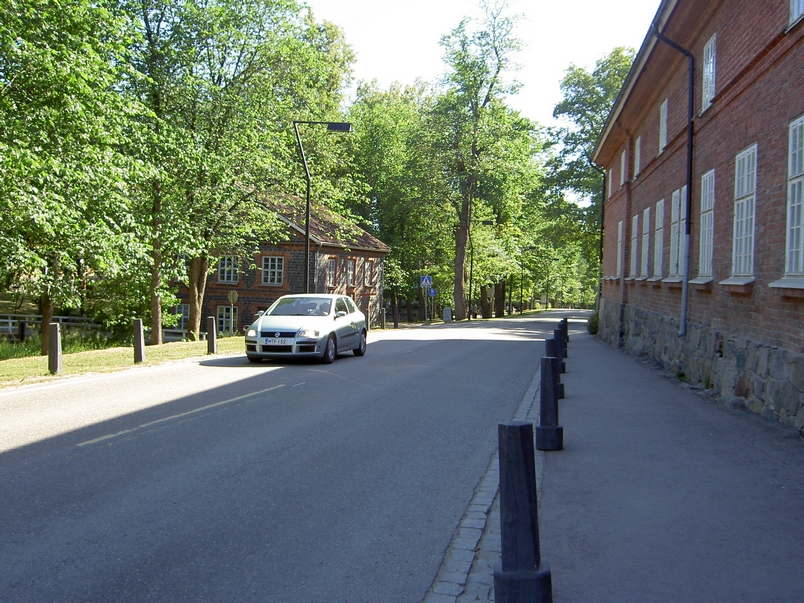
- A view from the main street of Fiskars
- Interactive map of Fiskars
- Coordinates: 60°07′47″N 23°32′32″E
- Country: Finland
- Region: Uusimaa
- Town: Raseborg
- Established: 1649
- Founded by: Petter Thorwöste

Population
  - Total: Less than 1,000

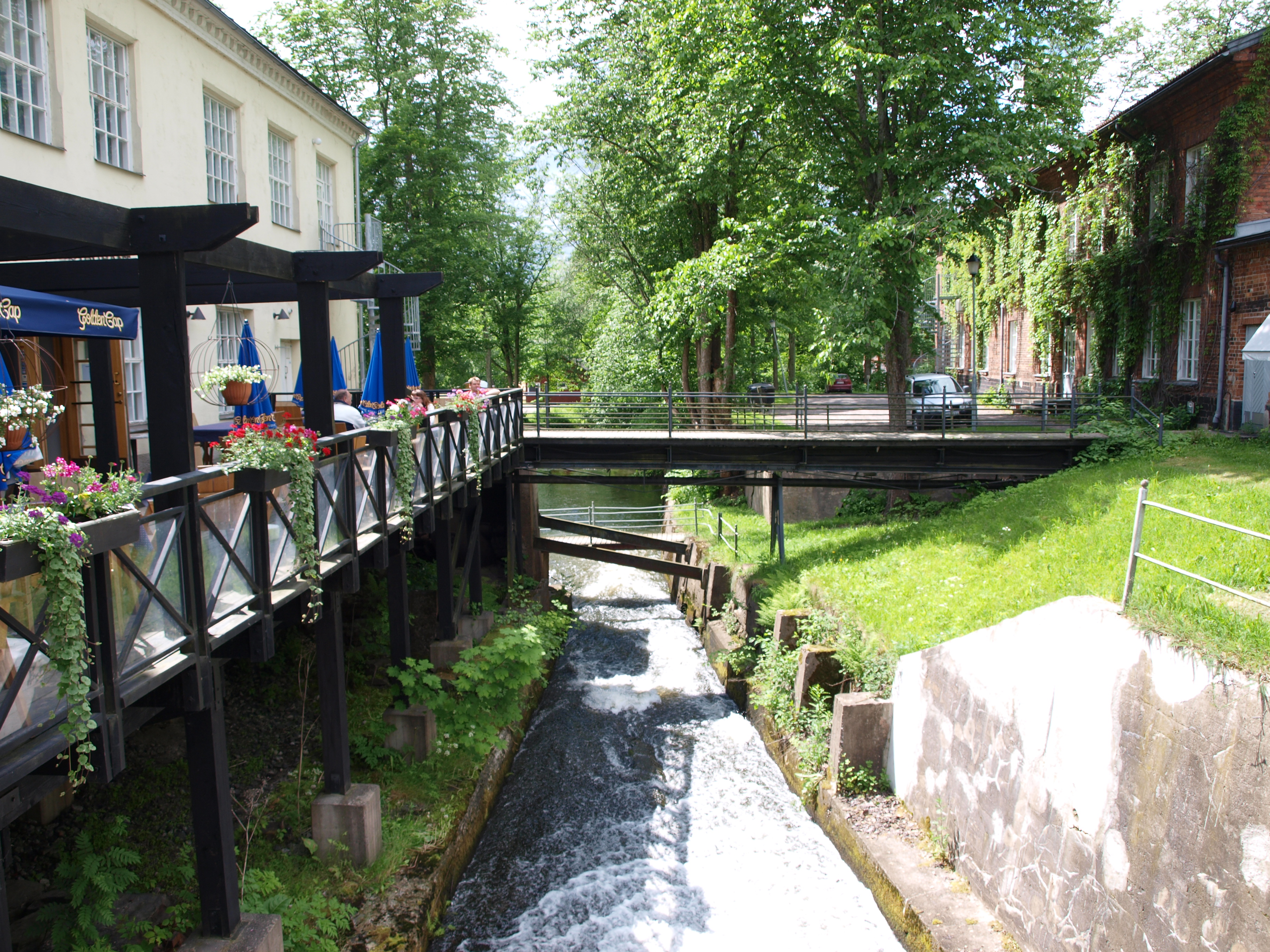
Central Fiskars in the summer.

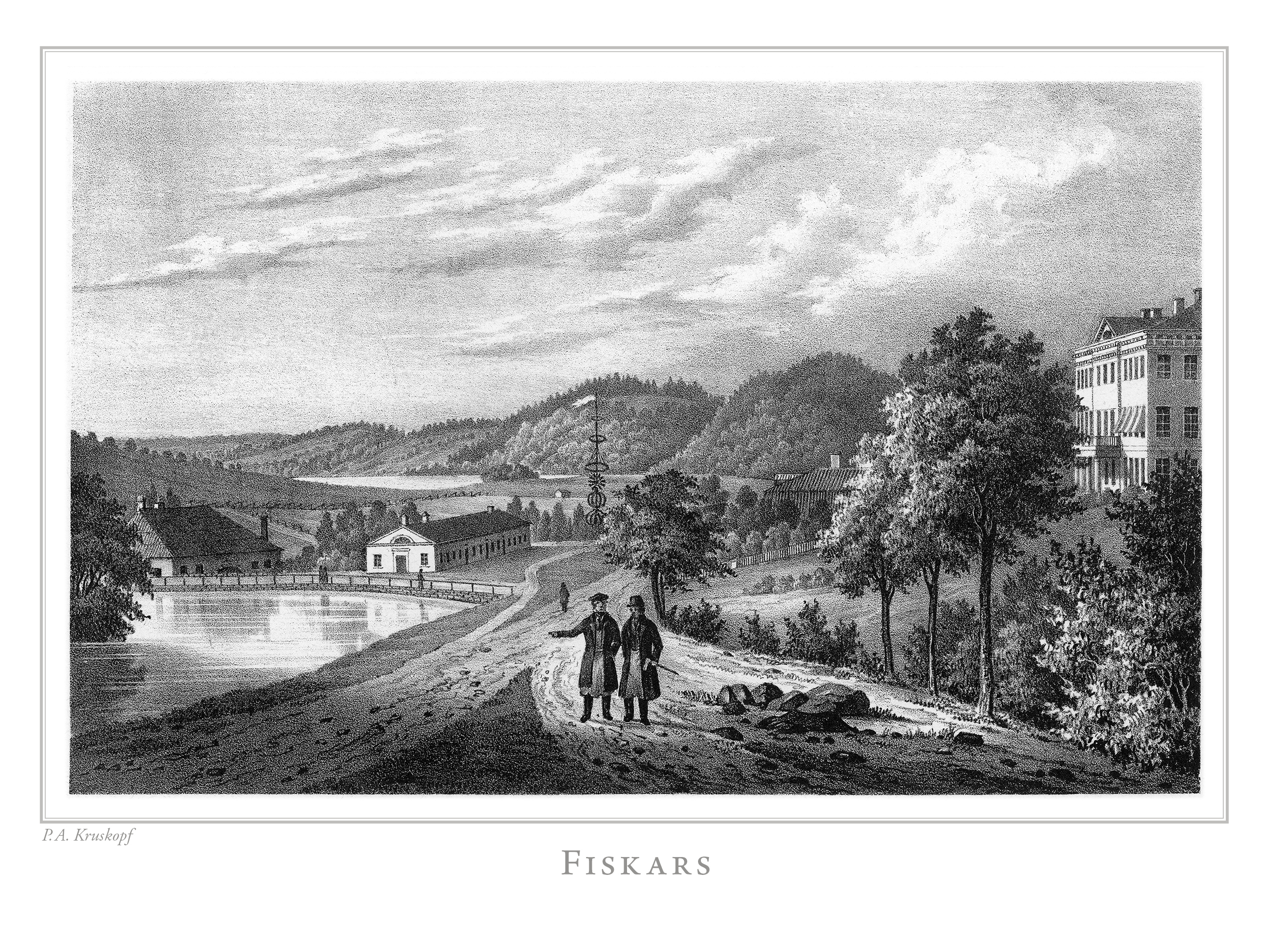
Illustration of Fiskars in Finland framstäldt i teckningar edited by Zacharias Topelius and published 1845-1852.

Fiskars (Swedish; Finnish: Fiskari) is a village in Pojo, Raseborg, Finland. The village is the site of the former Fiskars Bruk, which was founded in 1649 and gave rise to the company Fiskars.

The most notable architectural attraction of Fiskars is a mansion designed in 1818 by Italian-born architect Charles Bassi. The village, which has less than 1000 inhabitants, is a popular tourist destination in summer, and hosts an artisan and artist community. The river Fiskarså (Swedish), Fiskarinjoki or Fiskarsinjoki (Finnish) has contributed to the industrialisation of the village.

== History ==
The name of Fiskars was first mentioned in 1606. It originally referred to a farm in the older village of Torby; the name literally translates to 'fisherman's (house)'. The Finnish name Fiskari is an adaptation of the Swedish name.

The village of Fiskars developed around the ironworks founded by German-born Petter Thorwöste in 1649. The ironworks also produced copper. In 1822, John Jacob von Julin bought the ironworks and founded a fine production facility in 1830 and Finland's first workshop in 1836. The development of the industrial community was fast, and the factories and workshops produced utility items from scissors and puukko knives to ploughs and power transmission devices. To transport the products, a narrow-gauge railroad from Fiskars to the Pohjankuru harbour was in use from 1891 to 1952. The history of the Fiskars company begins from the Fiskars Bruk, but the company no longer has active factories in the village.

Fiskars became part of the town of Raseborg in 2009, when it was formed as a merger of Pojo, Ekenäs and Karis.

== Modern history ==
Nowadays, the factory is a lively centre of Finnish art and design. There are about 600 people living in the factory area and it is very popular among artists, artisans and designers. Especially in summer, the Fiskars Bruk is a popular tourist destination. Also in winter, various exhibitions and conference, accommodation and restaurant services, as well as workshops and shops provide things to see and experience. In 2019, the village launched a new festival, the Fiskars Village Art & Design Biennale. Several leading Finnish designers and design brands are based in the Fiskars village, including Kim Simonsson, Karin Widnäs, Nikari and Feathr.

== Sport ==
Fiskars hosted the inaugural World Orienteering Championships, 1–2 October 1966.

== Notable residents ==
- Erna Aaltonen (born 1951), ceramist
- Howard Smith (designer) (1928–2021) American-born Finnish artist and designer
