= Karl Johansson =

Swedish orienteering competitor

Medal record

Men's orienteering

Representing Sweden

World Championships
Gold medal – first place	1966 Fiskars	Relay
Gold medal – first place	1968 Linköping	Individual
Gold medal – first place	1968 Linköping	Relay
Silver medal – second place	1970 Friedrichroda	Relay

Karl Johansson, also known as Kalle Johansson, (born 15 June 1940) is a Swedish orienteering competitor, winner of the 1968 Individual World Orienteering Championships. He is two times Relay World Champion as a member of the Swedish winning teams in 1966 and 1968, as well as having silver medal from 1970. He won the Jukola relay in 1965.
