= Stig Berge =

Norwegian orienteer (born 1942)

Medal record

Men's orienteering

Representing Norway

World Championships
Gold medal – first place	1970 Friedrichroda	Individual
Gold medal – first place	1970 Friedrichroda	Relay
Silver medal – second place	1972 Doksy	Individual
Bronze medal – third place	1966 Fiskars	Relay
Bronze medal – third place	1968 Linköping	Relay

Stig Berge (born 28 March 1942 in Meldal Municipality) is a retired Norwegian orienteer, and Master of Science in engineering.

Stig Berge won two gold at the World Orienteering Championships in 1970, one individually and one for the team relay. He also won silver at the 1972 World Orienteering Championships, and bronze in the relay in 1966. In the 1964 European Championships he won the silver in the relay.

Berge was crowned Norwegian champion 4 times between 1964 and 1971. He competed for Løkken IF and NTHI, the sports team at the Norwegian Institute of Technology, and was a part of the winning team at the national championships in 1963, 1965 and 1973.

In 1970 Berge was elected Norwegian Sportsperson of the Year.

Awards and achievements
Preceded by Dag Fornæss	Norwegian Sportsperson of the Year; 1970	Succeeded by Leif Jenssen
