= Göran Öhlund =

Swedish orienteering competitor

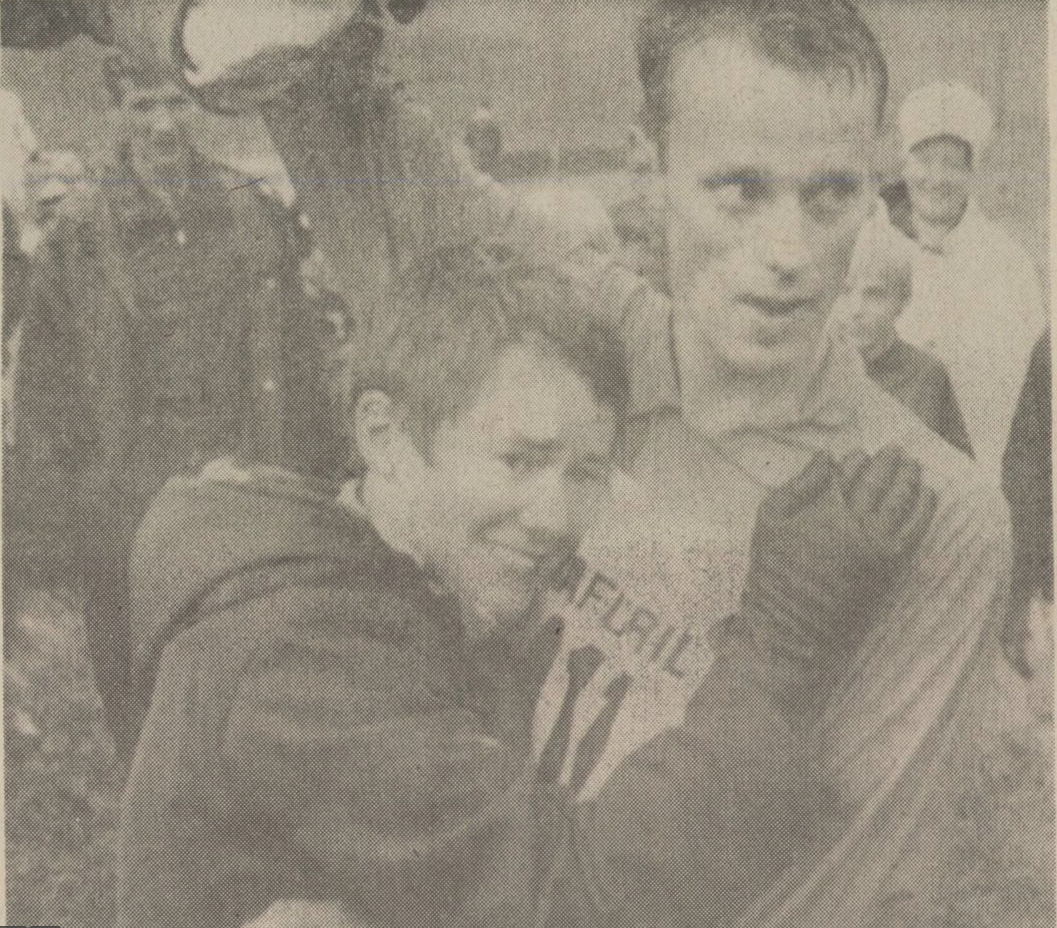
- Öhlund is met by his wife Ingrid, after winning the world championship in the relay in 1968.

Sport
- Sport: Orienteering
Medal record
Men's orienteering
Representing Sweden
World Championships
Gold medal – first place	1966 Fiskars	Relay
Gold medal – first place	1968 Linköping	Relay

Göran Öhlund (born 13 December 1942) is a Swedish orienteering competitor. He is two times Relay World Champion as a member of the Swedish winning teams in 1966 and 1968.
