= Le Brassus =

Village in Vaud, Switzerland

Coordinates: 46°35′N 6°13′E

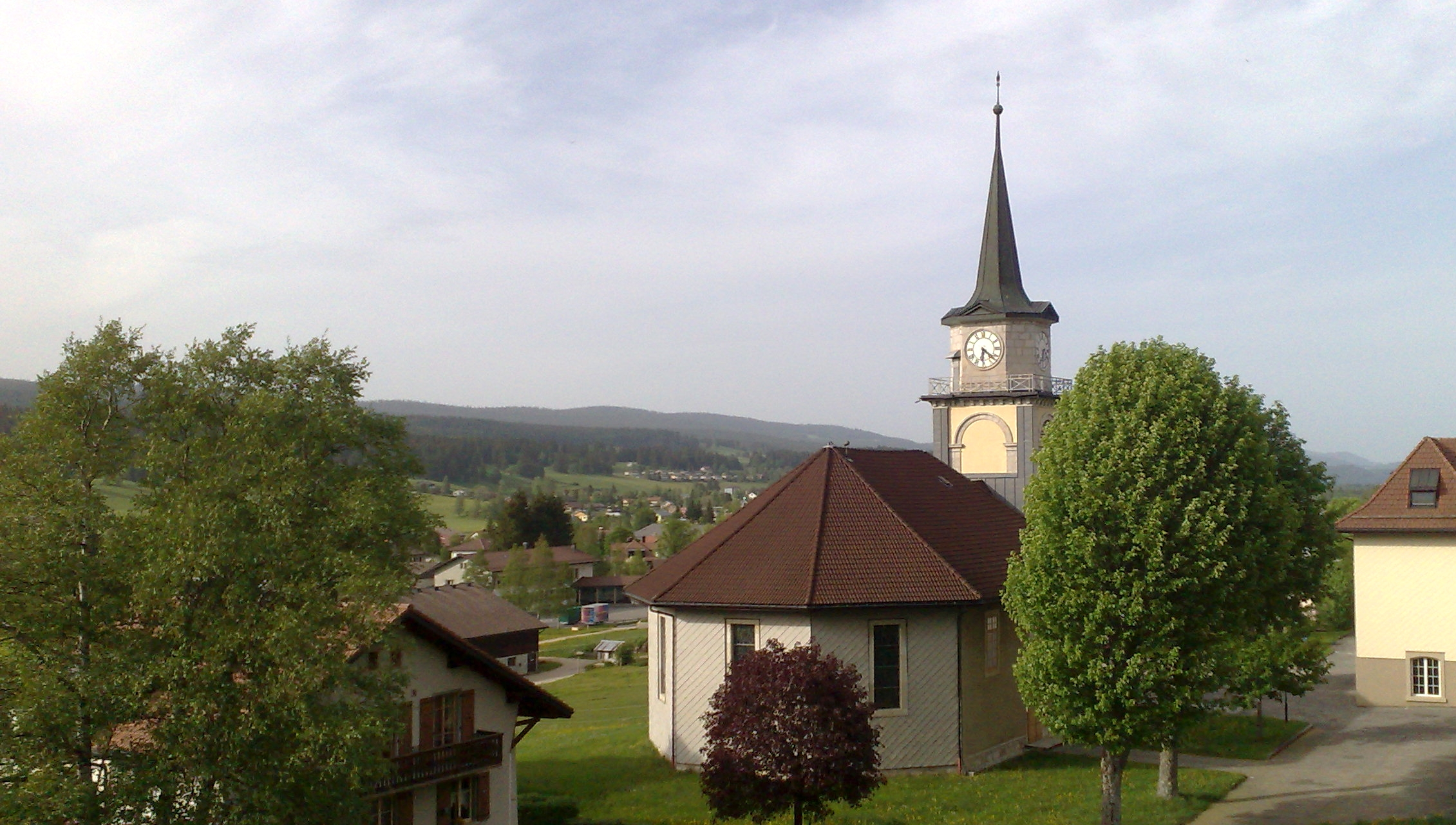
Protestant church in Le Brassus

Aerial view (1964)

Le Brassus is a village in the Vallée de Joux in the Canton of Vaud, Switzerland. It is part of the municipality Le Chenit.

== Transport ==
Le Brassus station is the western terminus of the Vallorbe–Le Brassus railway line. Trains on this line are operated by Travys.

== Sports ==
Le Brassus hosted the second European Orienteering championships in 1964.

== Horology ==
Le Brassus is the home of the luxury watchmakers Audemars Piguet and Blancpain.
