= 2017 in orienteering =

== 2017 Orienteering World Cup ==
- May 25 – 28: Orienteering World Cup #1 in Finland
  - Long winners: (Norway) Magne Dæhli (m) / (Sweden) Tove Alexandersson (f)
  - Middle winners: (Sweden) Martin Regborn (m) / (Sweden) Helena Jansson (f)
  - Sprint winners: (Belgium) Yannick Michiels (m) / (Denmark) Maja Alm (f)
  - Sprint Relay winners: Sweden 1 (Karolin Ohlsson, Emil Svensk, Jonas Leandersson, Helena Jansson)
- June 30 – July 8: Orienteering World Cup #2 in Estonia
  - Long winners: (Norway) Olav Lundanes (m) / (Sweden) Tove Alexandersson (f)
  - Middle winners: (France) Thierry Gueorgiou (m) / (Sweden) Tove Alexandersson (f)
  - Relay winners: Norway (Eskil Kinneberg, Olav Lundanes, Magne Dæhli) (m) / Sweden (Emma Johansson, Helena Jansson, Tove Alexandersson)
  - Sprint winners: (Switzerland) Daniel Hubmann (m) / (Denmark) Maja Alm (f)
  - Sprint Relay winners: Sweden (Lina Strand, Jerker Lysell, Jonas Leandersson, Helena Jansson)
- August 25 – 27: Orienteering World Cup #3 in Latvia
  - Middle winners: (Norway) Olav Lundanes (m) / (Russia) Natalia Gemperle (f)
  - Relay winners: Sweden 2 (Jonas Leandersson, Albin Ridefelt, William Lind) (m) / Switzerland 1 (Elena Roos, Julia Gross, Sabine Hauswirth)
  - Sprint winners: (Czech Republic) Vojtěch Král (m) / (Sweden) Tove Alexandersson (f)
- September 29 – October 1: Orienteering World Cup #4 (final) in Switzerland

== 2017 MTB Orienteering World Cup ==
- June 2 – 5: MTB Orienteering World Cup round 1 in Austria
  - Middle winners: (Italy) Luca Dallavalle (m) / (Czech Republic) Martina Tichovská (f)
  - Sprint winners: (Czech Republic) Kryštof Bogar (m) / (United Kingdom) Emily Benham (f)
  - Long winners: (Czech Republic) Vojtech Ludvik / (United Kingdom) Emily Benham (f)
- July 29 – August 5: MTB Orienteering World Cup round 2 in France
  - Sprint U21 winners: (France) Cedric Beill (m) / (Czech Republic) Martina Tichovská (f)
  - Middle U21 winners: (Finland) Jussi Laurila (m) / (United Kingdom) Emily Benham (f)
  - Long U21 winners: (Denmark) Rasmus Søgaard (m) / (Russia) Olga Shipilova Vinogradova (f)
- August 20 – 26: MTB Orienteering World Cup round 3 in Lithuania
  - Middle winners: (Czech Republic) Kryštof Bogar (m) / (Russia) Olga Shipilova Vinogradova (f)
  - Long winners: (Denmark) Rasmus Søgaard (m) / (United Kingdom) Emily Benham (f)
  - Sprint winners: (Russia) Grigory Medvedev (m) / (Finland) Marika Hara (f)

== Continental & International Orienteering events ==
- February 7 – 12: European Ski Orienteering Championships 2017 in Finland
  - Sprint winners: (Russia) Andrey Lamov (m) / (Sweden) Tove Alexandersson (f)
  - Mixed Sprint relay winners: Russia (Polina Frolova, Andrey Lamov)
  - Long winners: (Russia) Andrey Lamov (m) / (Russia) Alena Trapeznikova (f)
  - Middle winners: (Norway) Lars Moholdt (m) / (Sweden) Tove Alexandersson (f)
  - Relay winners: Sweden (Martin Hammarberg, Ulrik Nordberg, Erik Rost) (m) / Russia (Alena Trapeznikova, Polina Frolova, Mariya Kechkina) (f)
- February 8 – 12: European Youth Ski Orienteering Championships 2017 in Finland
  - Sprint winners: (Finland) Eerik Nurminen (m) / (Switzerland) Lea Widmer (f)
  - Long winners: (Finland) Vaino Kotro (m) / (Russia) Veronika Kalinina (f)
  - Middle winners: (Finland) Vaino Kotro (m) / (Russia) Veronika Kalinina (f)
  - Relay winners: Finland (Vaino Kotro, Matias Maijala, Eerik Nurminen) (m) / Finland (Venla Taulavuori, Maria Hoskari, Siiri Saalo) (f)
- February 8 – 12: Junior World Ski Orienteering Championships 2017 in Finland
  - Sprint winners: (Russia) Vladislav Kiselev (m) / (Finland) Liisa Nenonen (f)
  - Long winners: (Russia) Vladislav Kiselev (m) / (Russia) Aleksandra Rusakova (f)
  - Middle winners: (Russia) Vladislav Kiselev (m) / (Finland) Liisa Nenonen (f)
  - Relay winners: Russia (Aleksandr Pavlenko, Vadim Ogorodnikov, Vladislav Kiselev) (m) / Finland (Tuuli Suutari, Veera Klemettinen, Liisa Nenonen) (f)
- February 9 – 12: World Masters Ski Orienteering Championships 2017 in Finland
  - Long: For results, click here.
  - Middle 1: For results, click here.
  - Middle 2: For results, click here.
- February 22 – 26: 6th Mediterranean Championships in Orienteering in (Turkey) Antalya
  - Middle winners: (Latvia) Artūrs Pauliņš (m) / (Russia) Anastasia Borovkova (f)
  - Long winners: (Italy) Mattia Debertolis (m) / (Russia) Anastasia Borovkova (f)
  - Sprint winners: (Italy) Mattia Debertolis (m) / (Italy) Irene Pozzebon (f)
- March 6 – 11: 2017 World Ski Orienteering Championships in Krasnoyarsk
  - Sprint relay winners: (Sweden) Erik Rost (m) / (Sweden) Tove Alexandersson (f)
  - Sprint winners: (Sweden) Ulrik Nordberg (m) / (Sweden) Tove Alexandersson (f)
  - Middle winners: (Bulgaria) Stanimir Belomazhev (m) / (Sweden) Tove Alexandersson (f)
  - Long winners: (Sweden) Erik Rost (m) / (Russia) Maria Kechkina (f)
  - Relay winners: Russia (Andrey Grigoriev, Kirill Veselov, Andrey Lamov) (m) / Russia (Alena Trapeznikova, Polina Frolova, Maria Kechkina)
- April 14 – 17: 2017 Oceania Orienteering Championships in Auckland
  - Sprint winners: (New Zealand) Ross Morrison (m) / (United Kingdom) Charlotte Watson (f)
  - Middle winners: (New Zealand) Nick Hann (m) / (United Kingdom) Charlotte Watson (f)
  - Long winners: (New Zealand) Gene Beveridge (m) / (Australia) Jo Allison (f)
  - Relay winners: New Zealand (Gene Beveridge, Matt Ogden, Nick Hann) / Australia (Natasha Key, Belinda Lawford, Jo Allison)
- April 22 – 28: World Schools Championship Orienteering 2017 in (Italy) Palermo
  - Long: For results, click here.
  - Middle: For results, click here.
- April 23 – 29: World Masters Orienteering Championships 2017 in (New Zealand) Auckland
  - Sprint: For results, click here.
  - Long: For results, click here.
- May 20: Baltic Orienteering Championships 2017 in Lithuania
  - Winners: (Belarus) Dimitry Mikhalkin (m) / (Belarus) Anastasia Denisova (f)
- June 5 – 19: 2017 World Military Orienteering Championships in Finland
  - Middle winners: (Estonia) Timo Sild (m) / (Russia) Svetlana Mironova (f)
  - Long winners: (Estonia) Timo Sild (m) / (Russia) Svetlana Mironova (f)
  - Relay winners: Russia 1 (Dmitry Nakonechny, Valentin Novikov, Leonid Novikov) (m) / Poland (Agata Stankiewicz, Hanna Wisniewska, Aleksandra Hornik)
- June 29 – July 7: European Youth Orienteering Championships 2017 in (Slovakia) Banská Bystrica
  - Long winners: (Poland) Piotr Rzeńca (U16) & (Slovakia) Jakub Dekret (U18) (m) / (Hungary) Csilla Gárdonyi (U16) & (Finland) Anu Tuomisto (U18) (f)
  - Sprint winners: (France) Antoine Becaert (U16) & (France) Guilhem Elias (U18) (m) / (Hungary) Csilla Gárdonyi (U16) & (Switzerland) Eliane Deininger (U18) (f)
  - Sprint Relay winners:
  - France 1 (Julien Vuitton, Quentin Andrieux, Antoine Becaert (U16) (m) / Finland 1 (Maria Maattanen, Melina Lahdenpera, Elisa Mattila) (U16) (f)
  - France 1 (Alexandre Vergnaud, Pierre Erbland, Guilhem Elias) (U18) (m) / Switzerland 1 (Siri Suter, Elena Pezzati, Eliane Deininger) (U18) (f)
- June 30 – July 8: 2017 World Orienteering Championships in (Estonia) Tartu
  - Long winners: (Norway) Olav Lundanes (m) / (Sweden) Tove Alexandersson (f)
  - Middle winners: (France) Thierry Gueorgiou (m) / (Sweden) Tove Alexandersson (f)
  - Relay winners: Norway (Eskil Kinneberg, Olav Lundanes, Magne Dæhli) (m) / Sweden (Emma Johansson, Helena Jansson, Tove Alexandersson)
  - Sprint winners: (Switzerland) Daniel Hubmann (m) / (Denmark) Maja Alm (f)
  - Sprint Relay winners: Sweden (Lina Strand, Jerker Lysell, Jonas Leandersson, Helena Jansson)
- July 9 – 16: Junior World Orienteering Championships 2017 in Finland
  - Middle distance winners: (Finland) Olli Ojanaho (m) / (Switzerland) Simona Aebersold (f)
  - Sprint distance winners: (Finland) Olli Ojanaho (m) / (Switzerland) Simona Aebersold (f)
  - Long distance winners: (Finland) Olli Ojanaho (m) / (Switzerland) Simona Aebersold (f)
  - Relay winners: Norway 1 (m) / Sweden 1 (f)
- July 10 – 15: World Trail Orienteering Championships in Lithuania
  - TempO winner: (Norway) Vetle Ruud Bråten
  - PreO winner: (Norway) Lars Jakob Waaler
  - Relay winners: Slovenia (Emil Kacin, Mateja Keresteš, Krešo Keresteš)
- July 24 – 27: Orienteering at the World Games 2017 in (Poland) Wrocław
  - Sprint winners: (Sweden) Jerker Lysell (m) / (Denmark) Maja Alm (f)
  - Middle winners: (Switzerland) Matthias Kyburz (m) / (Sweden) Helena Jansson (f)
  - Sprint Relay Denmark (Cecilie Friberg Klysner, Andreas Hougaard Boesen, Søren Bobach, Maja Alm)
- July 29 – August 5: European MTB Orienteering Championships in France
  - Sprint U21 winners: (France) Cedric Beill (m) / (Czech Republic) Martina Tichovská (f)
  - Middle U21 winners: (Finland) Jussi Laurila (m) / (United Kingdom) Emily Benham (f)
  - Long U21 winners: (Denmark) Rasmus Søgaard (m) / (Russia) Olga Shipilova Vinogradova (f)
- July 29 – August 5: 2017 Youth and Junior Championships in France
  - Sprint U17 winners: (Czech Republic) Jan Hašek (m) / (France) Lucie Rudkiewicz (f)
  - Middle U17 winners: (Czech Republic) Jan Hašek (m) / (Finland) Saara Yli-Hietanen (f)
  - Long U17 winners: (Denmark) Mikkel Brunstedt Nørgaard (m) / (Finland) Saara Yli-Hietanen (f)
  - Sprint U20 winners: (Denmark) Thomas Steinthal (m) / (Russia) Olga Mikhaylova (f)
  - Middle U20 winners: (Switzerland) Adrian Jaeggi (f) / (Czech Republic) Vilma Králová (f)
  - Long U20 winners: (Denmark) Thomas Steinthal (m) / (Sweden) Elvira Larsson (f)
  - Sprint U21 winners: (France) Cedric Beill (m) / (Czech Republic) Martina Tichovská (f)
  - Middle U21 winners: (Finland) Jussi Laurila (m) / (United Kingdom) Emily Benham (f)
  - Long U21 winners: (Denmark) Rasmus Søgaard (m) / (Russia) Olga Shipilova Vinogradova (f)
- July 30 – August 4: World Masters MTB Orienteering Championships 2017 in France
  - Day 1: For results, click here.
  - Day 3: For results, click here.
  - Day 4: For results, click here.
- August 20 – 26: World MTBO Championships 2017 in Lithuania
  - Middle winners: (Czech Republic) Kryštof Bogar (m) / (Russia) Olga Shipilova Vinogradova (f)
  - Mass start winners: (Italy) Luca Dallavalle (m) / (United Kingdom) Emily Benham (f)
  - Relay winners: Czech Republic (Vojtěch Stránský, Vojtech Ludvik, Kryštof Bogar) (m) / Finland (Ingrid Stengård, Antonia Haga, Marika Hara) (f)
  - Long winners: (Denmark) Rasmus Søgaard (m) / (United Kingdom) Emily Benham (f)
  - Sprint winners: (Russia) Grigory Medvedev (m) / (Finland) Marika Hara (f)
- August 20 – 26: Junior World MTBO Championships 2017 in Lithuania
  - Middle winners: (France) Samson Deriaz (m) / (Czech Republic) Veronika Kubinová (f)
  - Mass start winners: (Denmark) Thomas Steinthal (m) / (Lithuania) Viktorija Michnovič (f)
  - Relay winners: Finland (Jesper Lindahl, Teemu Kaksonen, Sakari Puolakanaho) (m) / Finland (Kaarina Nurminen, Jutta Nurminen, Saara Yli-Hietanen) (f)
  - Long winners: (Denmark) Thomas Steinthal (m) / (Czech Republic) Veronika Kubinová (f)
  - Sprint winners: (Russia) Yuri Balev (m) / (France) Constance Devillers (f)
- August 20 – 25: 2nd Asian Junior & Youth Orienteering Championships in (China) Hailar District
- August 24 – 26: 2017 South East European Orienteering Championships in Montenegro
  - Long U16 winners: (Bulgaria) Valentin Neykov (m) / (Bulgaria) Yasna Petrova (f)
  - Middle U16 winners: (Romania) Alexandru Cătană (m) / (Bulgaria) Evangelina Dyaksova (f)
  - Sprint U16 winners: (Bulgaria) Mihail Mihaylov (m) / (Bulgaria) Yasna Petrova (f)
  - Relay's U16 winners: Romania (Alexandru Cătană, Szikszai Csongor, Lorand Vigh) (m) / Bulgaria (Niya Georgieva, Evangelina Dyaksova, Yasna Petrova)
  - Long U18 winners: (Bulgaria) Boyan Ivandjikov (m) / (Romania) Adela Gălăţeanu (f)
  - Middle U18 winners: (Bulgaria) Boyan Ivandjikov (m) / (Bulgaria) Mariya Dermendzhieva (f)
  - Sprint U18 winners: (Bulgaria) Plamen Georgiev (m) / (Bulgaria) Borislava Mitkova (f)
  - Relay's U18 winners: Bulgaria (Plamen Georgiev, Boyan Ivandjikov, Petar Borisov) (m) / Bulgaria (Mariya Dermendzhieva, Elitsa Atanasova, Borislava Mitkova)
  - Long U20 winners: (Serbia) Miloš Bilić (m) / (Romania) Agnes Neda (f)
  - Middle U20 winners: (Romania) Mihai Țînțar (m) / (Romania) Agnes Neda (f)
  - Sprint U20 winners: (Slovenia) Mark Bogataj (m) / (Romania) Agnes Neda (f)
  - Relay's U20 winners: Romania (Claudiu Rob, Mihai Țînțar, George Minoiu) (m) / Romania (Bianca Stamate, Roxana Culcean, Agnes Neda)
  - Long U21 winners: (Bulgaria) Ivan Sirakov (m) / (Bulgaria) Iliana Ilieva (f)
  - Middle U21 winners: (Bulgaria) Ivan Sirakov (m) / (Bulgaria) Iliana Ilieva (f)
  - Sprint U21 winners: (Bulgaria) Ivan Sirakov (m) / (Bulgaria) Iliana Ilieva (f)
  - Relay's U21 winners: Bulgaria (Stefan Mihaylov, Ivaylo Kamenarov, Ivan Sirakov) (m) / Bulgaria (Liliana Gotseva, Kristina Ivanova, Iliana Ilieva)
