= Adrian Jackson (orienteer) =

Australian mountain bike orienteer

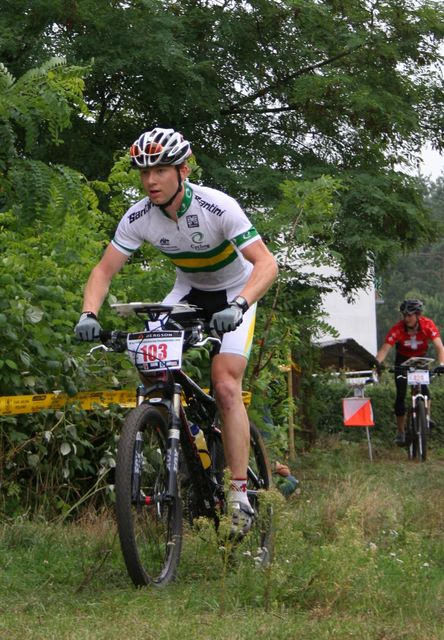

Medal record

Representing Australia

Men's mountain bike orienteering

World Championships
Gold medal – first place	2004 Ballarat, Australia	Middle
Gold medal – first place	2008 Ostróda	Middle
Gold medal – first place	2009 Ben Shemen	Long
Gold medal – first place	2009 Ben Shemen	Sprint
Gold medal – first place	2010 Montalegre	Sprint
Silver medal – second place	2010 Montalegre	Long
Silver medal – second place	2010 Montalegre	Middle
Bronze medal – third place	2004 Ballarat, Australia	Long
Bronze medal – third place	2004 Ballarat, Australia	Relay
Bronze medal – third place	2005 Banská Bystrica	Long

Oceania MTB Orienteering Championships
Gold medal – first place	2007 Victoria, Australia	Sprint
Gold medal – first place	2007 Victoria, Australia	Middle
Gold medal – first place	2007 Victoria, Australia	Long

Adrian Jackson (born 1983) is an Australian mountain bike orienteering competitor and World Champion. He has won individual gold medals at the 2004, 2008, 2009 and 2010 World MTB Orienteering Championships.

Adrian is sponsored by Mérida and is a member of the Mérida Flight Centre Racing Team. He rides a Mérida NINETY-NINE (dual suspension), an Big.Nine (29er hardtail) and an Scultura EVO SLX Team (road bike).

He is also an elite mountain biker in the Australian domestic racing scene in the cross country, enduro, marathon and stage racing format events.

In addition, he has a Bachelor of Mechanical Engineering/Aerospace Technology (Hons) from Monash University and a Doctorate of Philosophy (PhD - Aerospace Engineering) from University of New South Wales.

He is known as "The Batsman" to an infamous group of road cyclists in Melbourne - The Kings Men

== Mountain bike orienteering career ==
Jackson competed at the 2004 World MTB Orienteering Championships in Ballarat, where he won his first world championship gold medal by winning the sprint, ahead of Alain Berger from Switzerland. He won a bronze medal in the long distance, and a bronze medal with the Australian relay team. At the 2005 World Championships in Banská Bystrica he won a bronze medal in the long distance, placed eighth in the middle distance, and seventh with the Australian relay team. At the 2006 Championships in Joensuu he placed sixth in the long distance and seventh in the middle distance. At the Oceania MTB Orienteering Championships in Victoria, Australia in 2007 he won gold medals in both the sprint, the middle distance and the long distance. At the 2008 World MTB Orienteering Championships in Ostróda, he won a gold medal in the middle distance, placed sixth in the sprint, placed sixth in the long distance, and eleventh in the relay. In Ben Shemen in 2009 he became world champion in both the sprint, ahead of Lasse Brun Pedersen, and in the long distance, ahead of Ruslan Gritsan, and placed fifth in the middle distance. At the 2010 World Championships in Montalegre he won a gold medal in the sprint, ahead of Tõnis Erm, a silver medal in the middle distance behind Samuli Saarela, and a silver medal in the long distance behind Anton Foliforov.
