= 2022 World MTB Orienteering Championships =

- Location: Falun, Sweden
- Dates: 15–20 July
- Competitors: 201 from 26 nations
- Website: Home page

The 2022 World MTB Orienteering Championships took place in Falun and Säter Municipality in Sweden from 15 to 20 July 2022.

== Program ==
All times are Central European Summer Time (UTC+02:00).

Date	Time	Event
Friday, 15 July	9:30	Middle distance
Saturday, 16 July	10:00	Relay
Sunday, 17 July	9:00	Long distance
Monday, 18 July	Rest day	
Tuesday, 19 July	10:00	Sprint
Wednesday, 20 July	10:00	Mass start

== Medal summary ==
=== Senior ===
Event	Gold	Silver	Bronze
Men
Middle (19,9 km)	Kryštof Bogar (CZE)	Samuel Pökälä (FIN)	Jan Hašek (CZE)
Relay (16,8-17,2 km)	Finland; André Haga; Jussi Laurila; Juha Lilja	Switzerland; Adrian Jäggi; Silas Hotz; Simon Brändli	Czech Republic; Jan Hašek; Vojtěch Ludvík; Kryštof Bogar
Long (41 km)	Marcus Jansson (SWE)	Kryštof Bogar (CZE)	André Haga (FIN)
Sprint (9,3 km)	Kryštof Bogar (CZE)	Vojtěch Stránský (CZE)	Lauri Malsroos (EST)
Mass start (28,4 km)	Samuel Pökälä (FIN)	Davide Machado (POR)	Kryštof Bogar (CZE)
Women
Middle (16,7 km)	Nikoline Splittorff (DEN)	Camilla Søgaard (DEN)	Nadia Larsson (SWE)
Relay (14,3-14,6 km)	Finland; Henna Saarinen; Ruska Saarela; Marika Hara	Denmark; Cæcilie Christoffersen; Nikoline Splittorff; Camilla Søgaard	Czech Republic; Renáta Pauličková; Marie Kamarytová; Martina Tichovská
Long (30,4 km)	Emily Benham Kvåle (GBR)	Camilla Søgaard (DEN)	Ruska Saarela (FIN)
Sprint (7,6 km)	Henna Saarinen (FIN)	Nikoline Splittorff (DEN)	Camilla Søgaard (DEN)
Mass start (22,1 km)	Camilla Søgaard (DEN)	Emily Benham Kvåle (GBR)	Martina Tichovská (CZE)

=== U20 ===
Event	Gold	Silver	Bronze
Men
Middle (15,7 km)	Hannes Hnilica (AUT)	Flurin Schnyder (SUI); Felix Silver (SWE)	Not awarded
Relay (12,3-12,5 km)	Finland; Paulus Hanhijärvi; Eemil Koskinen; Tatu Aaltonen	Sweden; Jon Hansson; Sverre Röjgård; Felix Silver	Czech Republic; Tomáš Zrník; Adam Černík; Matěj Tůma
Long (27,3 km)	Felix Silver (SWE)	Tatu Aaltonen (FIN)	Flurin Schnyder (SUI)
Sprint (6,9 km)	Felix Silver (SWE)	Flurin Schnyder (SUI)	Matěj Tůma (CZE)
Mass start (20,6 km)	Felix Silver (SWE)	Tatu Aaltonen (FIN)	Akseli Pesu (FIN)
Women
Middle (13,3 km)	Kaarina Nurminen (FIN)	Silja Yli-Hietanen (FIN)	Tilda Palm (SWE)
Relay (10,9-11,1 km)	Sweden; Yrsa Röjgård; Hanna Ring; Tilda Palm	Finland; Vilma Pesu; Emma-Riikka Laamanen; Aino Kankaanpää	Czech Republic; Lucie Nedomlelová; Rozálie Kuchařová; Natali Chamraďa
Long (23,1 km)	Kaarina Nurminen (FIN)	Iris Aurora Pecorari (ITA)	Natali Chamraďa (CZE)
Sprint (5,8 km)	Kaarina Nurminen (FIN)	Silja Yli-Hietanen (FIN)	Aino Kankaanpää (FIN)
Mass start (17,1 km)	Kaarina Nurminen (FIN)	Iris Aurora Pecorari (ITA)	Tilda Palm (SWE)

== Medal table ==
* Host nation (Sweden)

Rank	Nation	Gold	Silver	Bronze	Total
1	Finland	9	6	4	19
2	Sweden*	5	2	3	10
3	Denmark	2	4	1	7
4	Czech Republic	2	2	9	13
5	Great Britain	1	1	0	2
6	Austria	1	0	0	1
7	Switzerland	0	3	1	4
8	Italy	0	2	0	2
9	Portugal	0	1	0	1
10	Estonia	0	0	1	1
Totals (10 entries)		20	21	19	60
