= 2025 European MTB Orienteering Championships =

- Location: Vilnius, Lithuania
- Dates: 15–18 May
- Competitors: 127 from 19 nations
- Website: Home page

The 2025 European MTB Orienteering Championships took place in Vilnius in Lithuania from 15 to 18 May 2025. Event also served as the first round of the CX80 MTB Orienteering World Cup 2025, a joint World Cup and European Championship event.

== Medal summary ==
Event	Gold	Silver	Bronze
Men
Middle (14,3 km)	Jonas Maišelis (LTU)	Vojtech Ludvik (CZE)	Teemu Kaksonen (FIN)
Sprint (7,6 km)	Fabiano Bettega (ITA)	Miika Nurmi (FIN)	Jonas Maišelis (LTU)
Mass start (27,7 km)	Samuel Pökälä (FIN)	Vojtech Ludvik (CZE)	Jonas Maišelis (LTU)
Women
Middle (12,3 km)	Nikoline Splittorff (DEN)	Saara YliHietanen (FIN)	Ruska Saarela (FIN)
Sprint (6,8 km)	Nikoline Splittorff (DEN)	Ruska Saarela (FIN)	Algirda Mickuvienė (LTU)
Mass start (24,8 km)	Nikoline Splittorff (DEN)	Ruska Saarela (FIN)	Ingrid Stengard (FIN)
Mixed events
Relay (12,3 km)	Czech Republic; Martina Tichovska; Vojtech Ludvik; Krystof Bogar	Lithuania; Algirda Mickuvienė; Jonas Maišelis; Ignas Ambrazas	Sweden; Elvira Larsson; Sverre Rojgard; Rasmus Nordgren

== Medal table ==
* Host nation (Lithuania)

Rank	Nation	Gold	Silver	Bronze	Total
1	Denmark	3	0	0	3
2	Finland	1	4	3	8
3	Czech Republic	1	2	0	3
4	Lithuania*	1	1	3	5
5	Italy	1	0	0	1
6	Sweden	0	0	1	1
Totals (6 entries)		7	7	7	21
