= Mika Tervala =

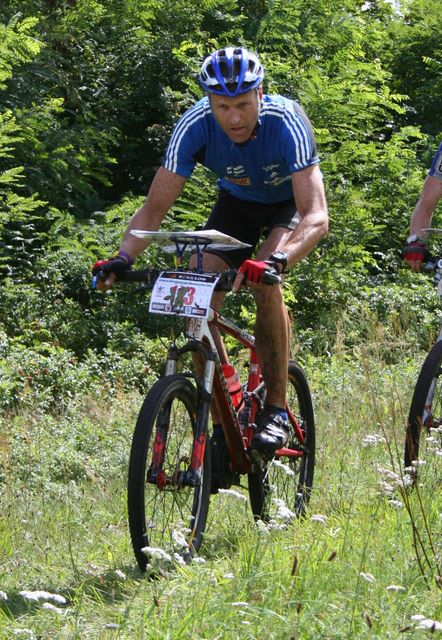

Medal record

Representing Finland

Men's mountain bike orienteering

World Championships
Gold medal – first place	2002 Fontainebleau	Sprint
Gold medal – first place	2004 Ballarat	Relay
Gold medal – first place	2005 Banská Bystrica	Relay
Gold medal – first place	2006 Joensuu	Long
Gold medal – first place	2006 Joensuu	Relay
Gold medal – first place	2007 Nové Město na Moravě	Middle
Silver medal – second place	2004 Ballarat	Long
Silver medal – second place	2006 Joensuu	Middle
Bronze medal – third place	2002 Fontainebleau	Relay
Bronze medal – third place	2005 Banská Bystrica	Middle

European Championships
Gold medal – first place	2006 Warsaw	Long
Gold medal – first place	2006 Warsaw	Relay
Gold medal – first place	2007 Castelfiorentino	Middle
Gold medal – first place	2007 Castelfiorentino	Long
Silver medal – second place	2006 Warsaw	Middle

Mika Tervala is a Finnish mountain bike orienteering competitor, World Champion and European Champion. He won individual gold medals at the 2002, 2006 and 2007 World Championships, and a gold medal in the relay in 2004, 2005 and 2006. Mika coaches the Finnish national mountain bike orienteering teams since spring 2008.

== Early sports career ==
Tervala started his sports career with biathlon. He competed in biathlon until 1993, when he switched to ski orienteering.

== Mountain bike orienteering ==
=== 2002-2005 ===
After his ski orienteering period Tervala experienced several successful years in mountain bike orienteering. He competed at the very first World Championships, in Fontainebleau in 2002, where he won a gold medal in the sprint, placed ninth in the long distance, and earned a bronze medal in the relay with the Finnish team. At the 2004 World Championships in Ballarat he placed sixth in the middle distance, won a silver medal in the long distance, and a gold medal in the relay together with Timo Sarkkinen and Jussi Mäkilä. He won a bronze medal in the middle distance at the 2005 World Championships in Banská Bystrica, and the Finnish team won the gold medal in the relay with the same team as in 2004 (Tervala, Timo Sarkkinen, Jussi Mäkilä).

=== 2006-2008 ===
In 2006 the World Championships were held in Joensuu in Finland. Tervala won a silver medal in the middle distance, and gold medals in the long distance and in the relay (with Jussi Mäkilä and Tuomo Tompuri). At the European Championships in Warsaw in August–September 2006, Tervala won gold medals in the long distance and in the relay, and a silver medal in the middle distance. At the European Championships in Castelfiorentino 2007 Tervala won gold medals in both the long distance and the middle distance. The 2007 World Championships were held in Nové Město na Moravě in August. Tervala placed fifth in the sprint distance and won a gold medal in the middle distance, while the Finnish relay team placed fifth. He also participated at the 2008 World Championships in Ostróda, where he placed sixth in the relay with the Finnish team.

== See also ==
- List of orienteers
- List of orienteering events
