= Maija Lång =

Finnish orienteering competitor

Medal record

Representing Finland

Women's mountain bike orienteering

World Championships
Gold medal – first place	2004 Australia	Relay
Gold medal – first place	2008 Ostróda	Relay

Maija Lång is a Finnish mountain bike orienteering competitor.

She competed at the 2004 World MTB Orienteering Championships, where she won a gold medal with the Finnish relay team together with Kirsi Korhonen and Päivi Tommola, and placed 13th in the middle distance.

At the 2008 World MTB Orienteering Championships in Ostróda, she placed 14th in the middle distance, 19th in the sprint, and won a gold medal in the relay, together with Marika Hara and Ingrid Stengård.
