= Ksenia Chernykh =

Russian mountain bike orienteer

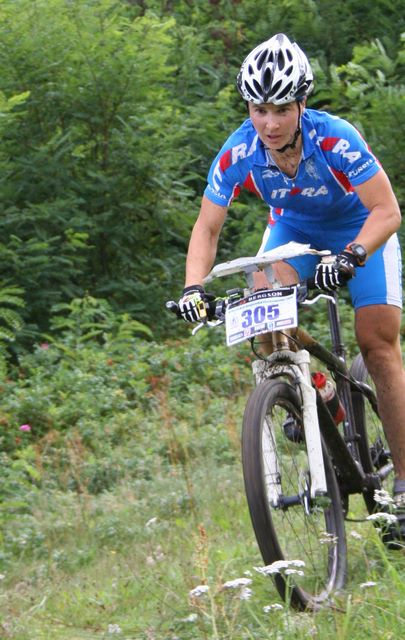

Medal record

Representing Russia

Women's mountain bike orienteering

World Championships
Gold medal – first place	2006 Joensuu	Relay
Gold medal – first place	2007 Nové Město na Moravě	Middle
Gold medal – first place	2007 Nové Město na Moravě	Sprint
Gold medal – first place	2008 Ostróda	Middle
Silver medal – second place	2006 Joensuu	Long
Silver medal – second place	2007 Nové Město na Moravě	Long
Silver medal – second place	2007 Nové Město na Moravě	Relay
Silver medal – second place	2008 Ostróda	Relay
Silver medal – second place	2010 Montalegre	Long
Bronze medal – third place	2009 Ben Shemen	Relay

Ksenia Chernykh is a Russian mountain bike orienteer and World Champion. She won individual gold medals at the 2007 and 2008 World MTB Orienteering Championships, and a relay gold medal in 2006.

== Mountain bike orienteering career ==
Chernykh competed at the 2004 World MTB Orienteering Championships in Ballarat, where she placed 27th in the middle distance and 50th in the long distance. At the 2005 World Championships in Banská Bystrica, she placed 18th in the middle distance, fifth in the long distance, and fifth with the Russian relay team. At the 2006 World MTB Orienteering Championships in Joensuu she placed 30th in the middle, won a silver medal in the long distance behind Christine Schaffner, and a gold medal in the relay, together with Nadia Mikriukova and Anna Ustinova on the Russian team. She won her first individual gold medals at the 2007 World MTB Orienteering Championships in Nové Město na Moravě, winning the sprint ahead of Michaela Gigon, and the middle distance ahead of Hana Bajtošova. She won a silver medal in the long distance, and a silver medal in the relay. At the 2008 World MTB Orienteering Championships in Ostróda, she placed 23rd in the sprint, won a gold medal in the middle distance, placed eight in the long distance, and silver medal in the relay. In Ben Shemen in 2009 she placed sixth in the long distance, 26th in the sprint, 27th in the middle distance, and won a bronze medal with the Russian relay team. At the 2010 World Championships in Montalegre she won a silver medal in the long distance, placed fifth with the Russian relay team, placed 26th in the middle distance and 34th in the sprint.
