= Bjarke Refslund =

Danish mountain bike orienteer

Medal record

Representing Denmark

Men's mountain bike orienteering

World Championships
Gold medal – first place	2011 Vicenza	Relay
Silver medal – second place	2010 Montalegre	Relay

Bjarke Refslund is a Danish mountain bike orienteer. He won a silver medal in the relay at the 2010 World MTB Orienteering Championships in Montalegre and a gold medal in the relay at the 2011 World MTB Orienteering Championships in Vicenza, together with Erik Skovgaard Knudsen and Lasse Brun Pedersen.
