= Christine Schaffner =

Swiss mountain bike orienteer

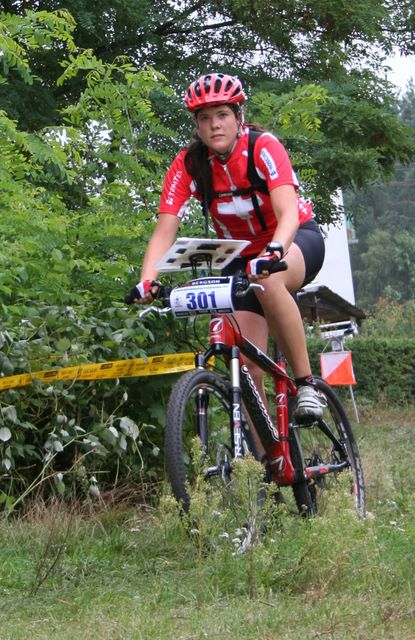

Medal record

Representing Switzerland

Women's mountain bike orienteering

World Championships
Gold medal – first place	2006 Joensuu	Long
Gold medal – first place	2008 Ostróda	Long
Gold medal – first place	2009 Ben Shemen	Long
Gold medal – first place	2010 Montalegre	Long
Silver medal – second place	2005 Banská Bystrica	Middle
Silver medal – second place	2009 Ben Shemen	Relay
Silver medal – second place	2010 Montalegre	Sprint
Bronze medal – third place	2007 Nové Město na Moravě	Long
Bronze medal – third place	2009 Ben Shemen	Middle

Christine Schaffner (born 3 February 1979) is a Swiss mountain bike orienteer and world champion. She has participated in all seven World MTB Orienteering Championships from 2004 to 2010, and won gold medals in the long distance four times, in 2006, 2008, 2009 and 2010.

== Mountain bike orienteering career ==
Schaffner competed at the 2004 World MTB Orienteering Championships Ballarat, where she placed 16th in the middle distance and 11th in the long distance. At the 2005 World MTB Orienteering Championships in Banská Bystrica she won a silver medal in the middle distance behind Michaela Gigon, and placed 16th in the long course. She participated on the Swiss relay team, which placed 8th. At the 2006 World MTB Orienteering Championships in Joensuu, she won her first gold medal in the long course, ahead of Ksenia Chernykh and Ingrid Stengård, and placed 10th in the middle distance. At the 2007 World Championships in Nové Město na Moravě she won a bronze medal in the long distance, placed fourth in the middle and fifth in sprint, while the Swiss relay team placed fifth. At the 2008 World MTB Orienteering Championships in Ostróda she won her second gold medal in the long distance, ahead of Marika Hara from Finland. She placed ninth in the sprint. In Ben Shemen in 2009 she again won a world championship gold medal in the long distance, ahead of Sonja Zinkl from Austria. She also won a bronze in the middle, placed 6th in the sprint, and won a silver medal in the relay with the Swiss team. Schaffner won her fourth gold medal in the long distance at the 2010 World Championships in Montalegre. She also won a silver medal in the sprint, placed fifth in the middle, and sixth in the relay.

She has won the long course at the Swiss mountain bike orienteering championships seven years in a row from 2003.

She lives in the municipality Köniz, and works as a goldsmith and teacher.
