= Tobias Breitschädel =

Austrian mountain bike orienteering competitor

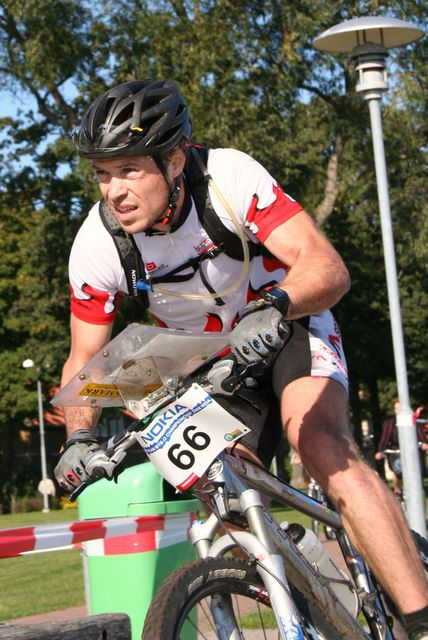

Medal record

Representing Austria

Men's mountain bike orienteering

World Championships
| Gold medal – first place | 2012 Veszprém | Sprint |
| Bronze medal – third place | 2011 Vicenza | Middle |

European Championships
| Gold medal – first place | 2008 Nida | Sprint |
| Silver medal – second place | 2009 Hillerød | Sprint |
| Bronze medal – third place | 2011 Saint Petersburg | Relay |

Tobias Breitschädel is an Austrian mountain bike orienteering competitor. At the 2011 World MTB Orienteering Championships in Vicenza, he won a bronze medal in the middle distance, behind Samuli Saarela from Finland and Ruslan Gritsan from Russia.
