= Gaëlle Barlet =

French mountain bike orienteer (born 1988)

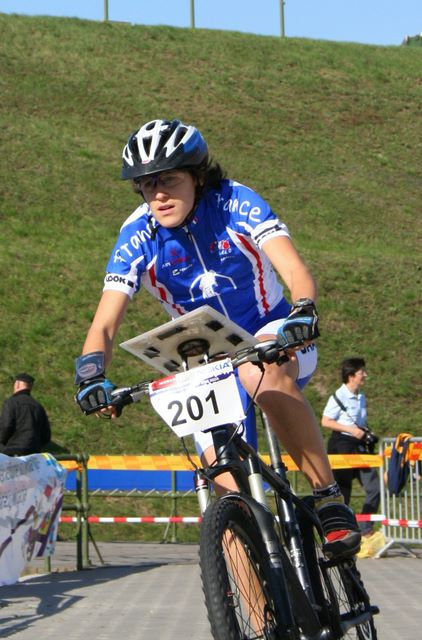
- Barlet in 2008

Personal information
- Born: 1988 (age 37–38)

Sport
- Sport: Foot orienteering; Mountain bike orienteering; Ski orienteering
Medal record
Representing France
Women's mountain bike orienteering
World Championships
Gold medal – first place	2011 Vicenza	Sprint
Women's ski orienteering
World Military Games
Silver medal – second place	2017 Sochi	Relay
Bronze medal – third place	2017 Sochi	Team sprint

Gaëlle Barlet (born 1988) is a French orienteer who competes in mountain bike orienteering, ski orienteering and foot orienteering. She is a former world champion in mountain bike orienteering.

At the 2011 World MTB Orienteering Championships in Vicenza, she won a gold medal in the sprint, ahead of Marika Hara from Finland and Michaela Gigon from Australia. She also won 4 medals at the European Championships, including the title on the middle in 2015.
