= Søren Strunge =

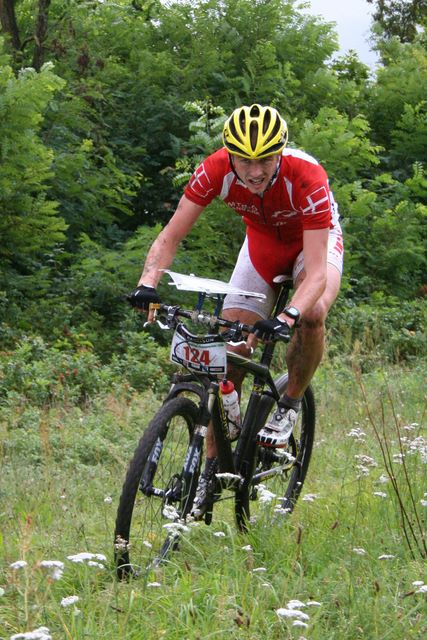

Medal record

Representing Denmark

Men's mountain bike orienteering

World Championships
Gold medal – first place	2008 Ostróda	Relay
Silver medal – second place	2008 Ostróda	Middle
Bronze medal – third place	2007 Nové Město na Moravě	Relay

Søren Strunge is a Danish mountain bike orienteering competitor and World Champion. He won a silver medal in the middle distance at the 2008 World MTB Orienteering Championships, as well as a gold medal in the relay together with Lasse Brun Pedersen and Torbjørn Gasbjerg.
