= Laura Scaravonati =

Italian mountain bike orienteer

Personal information
- Born: 1978 (age 47–48)

Sport
- Sport: Mountain bike orienteering
Medal record
Representing Italy
Women's mountain bike orienteering
World Championships
Bronze medal – third place	2011 Vicenza	Long

Laura Scaravonati (born 1978) is an Italian mountain bike orienteering competitor. At the 2011 World MTB Orienteering Championships in Vicenza, she won a bronze medal in the long course, behind Rikke Kornvig from Denmark and Ingrid Stengård from Finland.
