= Ramunė Arlauskienė =

Lithuanian mountain bike orienteer (born 1973)

Medal record

Representing Lithuania

Women's mountain bike orienteering

World Championships
Bronze medal – third place	2005 Banská Bystrica	Middle

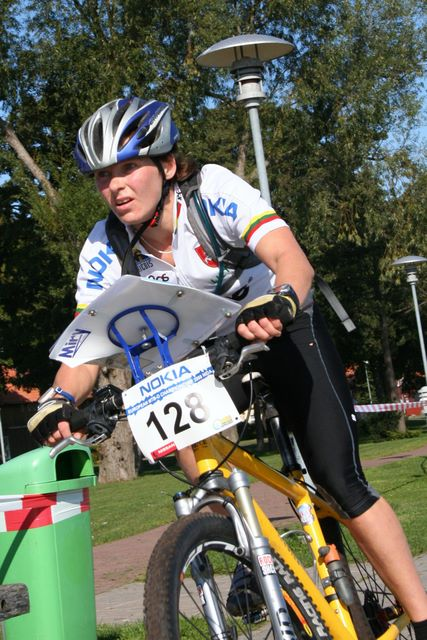
Arlauskienė in 2008

Ramunė Arlauskienė (born 23 March 1973) is a Lithuanian mountain bike orienteer. She won a bronze medal in the middle distance at the 2005 World MTB Orienteering Championships, behind Michaela Gigon and Christine Schaffner-Räber. She placed 22nd in the long distance, and her team placed ninth in the relay.
