= Gerit Pfuhl =

German mountain bike orienteer

Medal record

Representing Germany

Women's mountain bike orienteering

World Championships
Gold medal – first place	2005 Banská Bystrica	Relay

Gerit Pfuhl is a German mountain bike orienteer. At the 2005 World MTB Orienteering Championships in Banská Bystrica she won a gold medal in the relay, together with Anke Dannowski and Antje Bornhak.

At the 2006 World MTB Championships she placed 13th in the middle distance and fifth in the relay.
