= Päivi Tommola =

Finnish mountain bike orienteering competitor

Medal record

Representing Finland

Women's mountain bike orienteering

World Championships
Gold medal – first place	2002 Fontainebleau	Long
Gold medal – first place	2002 Fontainebleau	Relay
Gold medal – first place	2004 Ballarat	Relay
Gold medal – first place	2005 Banská Bystrica	Long
Gold medal – first place	2007 Nové Město na Moravě	Relay
Silver medal – second place	2004 Ballarat	Long
Silver medal – second place	2006 Joensuu	Relay
Bronze medal – third place	2008 Ostróda	Middle

European Championships
Gold medal – first place	2006 Warsaw	Relay
Gold medal – first place	2007 Castelfiorentino	Middle
Gold medal – first place	2007 Castelfiorentino	Long
Silver medal – second place	2007 Castelfiorentino	Relay

Päivi Tommola (born 1971) is a Finnish mountain bike orienteering competitor, World Champion and European Champion. She won individual gold medals at the 2002 and 2005 World Championships, and gold medals in the relay in 2002, 2004 and 2007.

== 2002-2005 ==
Tommola competed at the very first World Championships, in Fontainebleau in 2002, where she won a gold medal in the long distance. She also won a gold medal in the relay with the Finnish team, together with Kirsi Korhonen and Mervi Väisänen. At the 2004 World Championships in Ballarat she won a silver medal in the long distance, behind winner Anke Dannowski from Germany, and a gold medal in the relay together with Maija Lång and Kirsi Korhonen. She won a gold medal in the long distance at the 2005 World Championships in Banská Bystrica.

== 2006-2008 ==
When the 2006 World Championships were held in Joensuu in Finland, Tommola won a silver medal in the relay with the Finnish team. She placed seventh in the middle distance and sixth in the long distance. At the European Championships in Warsaw in August-September 2006, the Finnish team won gold medals in the relay, with Tommola, Ingrid Stengård and Maija Lång on the team. At the European Championships in Castelfiorentino 2007 Tommola won gold medals in both the long distance and the middle distance, and also a silver medal in the relay. The 2007 World Championships were held in Nové Město na Moravě in August, and the Finnish relay team won gold medals with Taija Jäppinen, Ingrid Stengård and Päivi Tommola. She won a bronze medal in the middle distance at the 2008 World Championships in Ostróda.

== See also ==
- Finnish orienteers
- List of orienteers
- List of orienteering events
