= Valeriy Gluhov =

Russian mountain bike orienteer

Medal record

Representing Russia

Men's mountain bike orienteering

World Championships
| Gold medal – first place | 2010 Montalegre | Relay |

Valeriy Gluhov is a Russian mountain bike orienteer. He won a gold medal in the relay at the 2010 World MTB Orienteering Championships, together with Ruslan Gritsan and Anton Foliforov, and placed fifth in the middle distance.
