= Nadia Mikriukova =

Russian mountain bike orienteer

Medal record

Representing Russia

Women's mountain bike orienteering

World Championships
Gold medal – first place	2006 Joensuu	Relay

Nadia Mikriukova (20 October 1972 — 17 January 2020) was a Russian mountain bike orienteer.

At the 2006 World MTB Orienteering Championships in Joensuu she won a gold medal in the relay, together with Ksenia Chernykh and Anna Ustinova.
