= Pfuhl =

Pfuhl (German for "quagmire", geographically and figurative) is a German topographic surname. Notable people with this surname include:

- Ernst Pfuhl (1876–1940), German-Swiss classical archaeologist and art historian, son of Johannes
- Gavin Pfuhl (1947–2002), South African first-class cricketer and cricket commentator
- Gerit Pfuhl, German mountain bike orienteer
- Graham Pfuhl (born 1950), South African cricketer
- Herb Pfuhl (1928–2011), American politician and teacher
- Johannes Pfuhl (1846–1914), German sculptor

== See also ==
- Anna Maria von Phul (1786–1823), an American artist
- Wenanty Fuhl (born 1960), a Polish footballer
- Pfuel, an ancient German noble family
- Wadephul, a German surname
