= Elisabeth Hohenwarter =

Austrian mountain bike orienteer

Medal record

Representing Austria

Women's mountain bike orienteering

World Championships
Gold medal – first place	2009 Ben Shemen	Relay

Elisabeth Hohenwarter is an Austrian mountain bike orienteer. She won a gold medal in the relay at the 2009 World MTB Orienteering Championships in Ben Shemen, together with Sonja Zinkl and Michaela Gigon.
