= Antje Bornhak =

German mountain bike orienteer

Medal record

Representing Germany

Women's mountain bike orienteering

World Championships
Gold medal – first place	2005 Banská Bystrica	Relay
Silver medal – second place	2005 Banská Bystrica	Long
Bronze medal – third place	2002 Fontainebleau	Sprint
Bronze medal – third place	2002 Fontainebleau	Long
Bronze medal – third place	2004 Ballarat	Long

Antje Bornhak is a German mountain bike orienteer. At the 2002 World MTB Orienteering Championships in Fontainebleau she won a bronze medal in the long distance, and a bronze medal in the sprint. At the 2004 World MTB Orienteering Championships in Ballarat she won a bronze medal in the long course. At the 2005 World Championships in Banská Bystrica she won a gold medal in the relay, together with Anke Dannowski and Gerit Pfuhl, and a silver medal in the long distance.
