= Tomeček =

Tomeček (feminine Tomečková) is a Czech surname. Notable people with the surname include:

- Jakub Tomeček (born 1991), Czech sport shooter
- Jan Tomeček (born 1990), Czech ice hockey player
- Lubomír Tomeček (born 1979), Czech mountain bike orienteer
- Nikola Tomečková (born 1974), Czech javelin thrower
- Vojtěch Tomeček (born 1994), Czech professional ice hockey player
- Samuel Tomeček (born 1989), Slovak singer
