= Jirásek =

Jirásek (feminine Jirásková) is a Czech surname derived from the given name Jiří. Notable people with the surname include:

- Alois Jirásek (1851–1930), Czech writer
- František Jirásek (?–1941), Czech footballer
- Jindřich Jirásek (born 1973), Czech footballer
- Jiřina Jirásková (1931–2013), Czech actress
- Ladislav Jirasek (1927–1977), Czech-German footballer
- Markéta Jirásková, Czech orienteer
- Milan Jirásek (born 1992), Czech footballer
- Vladimír Jirásek (1933–2018), Czech slalom canoer
