= Anna Kamińska =

Polish mountain bike orienteer

Personal information
- Full name: Anna Kamińska
- Nationality: Polish
- Born: 4 October 1983 (age 42)

Sport
- Sport: Mountain bike orienteering
Medal record
Representing Poland
Women's mountain bike orienteering
World Championships
| Gold medal – first place | 2010 Montalegre | Sprint |

Anna Kamińska (born 4 October 1983) is a Polish mountain bike orienteer. She won a gold medal in the sprint event at the 2010 World MTB Orienteering Championships in Montalegre.
