= Beat Okle =

Swiss mountain bike orienteer

Medal record

Representing Switzerland

Men's mountain bike orienteering

World Championships
Bronze medal – third place	2008 Ostróda	Long

European Championships
Silver medal – second place	2006 Warsaw	Middle

Beat Okle is a Swiss mountain bike orienteer. Okle won a bronze medal in the long distance at the 2008 World MTB Orienteering Championships in Ostróda, and placed seventh in the middle distance and fourth with the Swiss relay team.
