= Erik Skovgaard Knudsen =

Danish mountain bike orienteer

Medal record

Representing Denmark

Men's mountain bike orienteering

World Championships
Gold medal – first place	2011 Vicenza	Relay
Silver medal – second place	2010 Montalegre	Relay
Silver medal – second place	2011 Vicenza	Long
Bronze medal – third place	2010 Montalegre	Long
Bronze medal – third place	2011 Vicenza	Sprint

European Championships
Gold medal – first place	2009 Hillerød	Middle
Gold medal – first place	2011 Saint Petersburg	Middle
Gold medal – first place	2011 Saint Petersburg	Long
Gold medal – first place	2011 Saint Petersburg	Sprint
Silver medal – second place	2009 Hillerød	Long
Silver medal – second place	2009 Hillerød	Sprint

Erik Skovgaard Knudsen (born 1981) is a Danish mountain bike orienteer. He won a bronze medal in the long distance at the 2010 World MTB Orienteering Championships in Montalegre, and a silver medal in the relay, together with Bjarke Refslund and Lasse Brun Pedersen.
