= Ramunė =

- Gender: Female
- Language: Lithuanian
- Name day: 19 June

Origin
- Meaning: camomile
- Region of origin: Lithuania

Ramunė is a Lithuanian feminine given name. People bearing the name Ramunė include:

- Ramunė Adomaitienė (born 1968), Lithuanian parathlete
- Ramunė Arlauskienė (born 1973), Lithuanian mountain bike orienteer
- Ramunė Kmieliauskaitė (born 1960), Lithuanian graphic artist and painter

== See also ==
- Ramūnas, Lithuanian male given name
