= Eric Knudsen (disambiguation) =

Eric or Erik Knudsen may refer to:

- Eric Knudsen, a professor of neurology at Stanford University
- Eric Alfred Knudsen, American author and politician
- Eric Knudsen, creator of the fictional character Slenderman
- Erik Knudsen, Canadian actor
- Erik Skovgaard Knudsen, Danish mountain bike orienteer

== See also ==
- Erik Knutsson
