= Emily Viner =

Australian mountain bike orienteer

Medal record

Representing Australia

Women's mountain bike orienteering

World Championships
Silver medal – second place	2002 Fontainebleau	Long

Emily Viner is an Australian mountain bike orienteer. She won a silver medal in the long distance at the 2002 World MTB Orienteering Championships, placed fourth in the sprint, and fifth in the relay with the Australian team.
