= Kornvig =

Kornvig is a Danish surname. Notable people with the name include:

- Emil Kornvig (born 2000), Danish footballer
- Rikke Kornvig (born 1983), Danish mountain bike orienteer
