= Foliforov =

Foliforov may refer to:

- Alexander Foliforov (born 8 March 1992) is a Russian professional racing cyclist.
- Anton Foliforov (born 3 January 1981) is a Russian mountain bike orienteer.
