= Belinda Allison =

Australian mountain bike orienteer

Medal record

Representing Australia

Women's mountain bike orienteering

World Championships
Silver medal – second place	2004 Ballarat	Middle

Belinda Allison is an Australian mountain bike orienteer. She won a silver medal in the middle distance at the 2004 World MTB Orienteering Championships, shared with Laure Coupat, and placed sixth in the long distance.
