= Jaggi =

Jaggi is a German surname (spelled Jäggi) derived from a diminutive for Jacob and Indian given name and surname. Notable people with the name include:

== Surname ==
- Allen Jaggi (born 1944), American politician from Wyoming
- Anil Jaggi, Indian Navy admiral
- Emely Jäggi (born 2008), Swiss sport shooter
- Ishank Jaggi (born 1989), Indian cricketer
- Kundan Lal Jaggi (1924–2018), Indian chef and restaurateur
- Louis Jäggi (1948–2006), Swiss skier
- Marco Jaggi, Swiss wrestler known by his stage name Ares
- Maya Jaggi, British writer, literary critic and editor
- Michèle Jäggi (born 1987), Swiss curler
- Param Jaggi (born 1994), American inventor
- Rattan Singh Jaggi (1927–2025), Indian scholar and author
- Steve Jaggi, Swiss-German film and TV producer
- Ursina Jäggi, Swiss mountain biker
- Vivien Jäggi (born 2006), Swiss sport shooter
- Willy Jäggi (1906–1968), Swiss footballer
- Yvette Jaggi (born 1941), Swiss politician

== Given name ==
- Jaggi Singh (activist) (born 1971), Canadian anti-globalization and social justice activist
- Jaggi Singh (actor) (born 1989), Panjabi actor and film producer
- Sadhguru Jaggi Vasudev (born 1957), Indian yogi and mystic

== See also ==
- Jaggie, in computer graphics
