= Matthieu Barthélémy =

French mountain bike orienteer (born 1982)

Personal information
- Born: 1982 (age 43–44)

Sport
- Sport: Mountain bike orienteering
Medal record
Men's mountain bike orienteering
Representing France
World Championships
Bronze medal – third place	2009 Ben Shemen	Long

Matthieu Barthélémy (born 1982) is a French mountain bike orienteer. He won a bronze medal in the long distance at the 2009 World MTB Orienteering Championships in Ben Shemen.
