= Gabrielė Andrašiūnienė =

Lithuanian mountain bike orienteer (born 1992)

Medal record

Representing Lithuania

Women's mountain bike orienteering

European Championships
Gold medal – first place	2022 Ignalina	Long
Silver medal – second place	2021 Abrantes	Middle

Gabrielė Andrašiūnienė (born 29 July 1992 in Vilnius, Lithuania) is a Lithuanian mountain bike orienteer, European champion in long-distance event in 2022.

== Biography ==
Andrašiūnienė finished second in middle-distance racing at the 2022 European MTB Orienteering Championships. She won a gold medal at the 2022 European MTB Orienteering Championships.
