= Jiří Hradil =

Jiří Hradil may refer to:

- Jiří Hradil (orienteer), a Czech mountain bike orienteer.
- Jiří Hradil (canoeist), a former Czechoslovak slalom canoeist.
