= Cecilia Thomasson =

Swedish mountain bike orienteer

Medal record

Representing Sweden

Women's mountain bike orienteering

World Championships
Gold medal – first place	2013 Rakvere	Sprint
Gold medal – first place	2014 Białystok	Middle

Cecilia Thomasson is a Swedish mountain bike orienteering competitor and World Champion. She won an individual gold medal at the 2013 World MTB Orienteering Championships, and another gold medal in 2014.
