= Saarela =

Saarela is a Finnish surname. Notable people with the surname include:

- Aleksi Saarela (born 1997), Finnish ice hockey forward
- Olli Saarela (born 1965), Finnish film director
- Pasi Saarela (born 1973), Finnish ice hockey player
- Samuli Saarela (born 1988), Finnish mountain bike orienteering competitor
- Yrjö Saarela (1884–1951), Finnish wrestler
