= Jérémie Gillmann =

French mountain bike orienteer

Medal record

Representing France

Men's mountain bike orienteering

World Championships
Gold medal – first place	2007 Nové Město na Moravě	Relay
Silver medal – second place	2002 Fontainebleau	Long
Silver medal – second place	2007 Nové Město na Moravě	Sprint
Silver medal – second place	2007 Nové Město na Moravě	Middle
Bronze medal – third place	2002 Fontainebleau	Sprint

Jérémie Gillmann (born 1976) is a French mountain bike orienteer. At the 2002 World MTB Orienteering Championships in Fontainebleau he won a silver medal in the long distance, and a bronze medal in the sprint. At the 2007 World MTB Orienteering Championships in Nové Město na Moravě, he won silver medals in the sprint and the middle distance, and a gold medal with the French relay team. Gillmann has won one silver and two bronze medals at the European Championships.
