= Anna Ustinova (orienteer) =

Russian mountain bike orienteer

Medal record

Representing Russia

Women's mountain bike orienteering

World Championships
Gold medal – first place	2006 Joensuu	Relay
Silver medal – second place	2007 Nové Město na Moravě	Relay

Anna Ustinova is a Russian mountain bike orienteer.

At the 2006 World MTB Orienteering Championships in Joensuu she won a gold medal in the relay, together with Ksenia Chernykh and Nadia Mikriukova.
