= Susanna Laurila =

Finnish orienteering competitor

Medal record

Representing Finland

Women's mountain bike orienteering

World Championships
Gold medal – first place	2012 Veszprém	Long
Silver medal – second place	2013 Rakvere	Long
Bronze medal – third place	2013 Rakvere	Middle

Susanna Laurila is a Finnish mountain bike orienteering competitor and World Champion. She won an individual gold medal at the 2012 World MTB Orienteering Championships, and a silver medal in 2013.
