= Anna Ustinova =

Anna Ustinova may refer to:

- Anna Ustinova (high jumper)
- Anna Ustinova (orienteer)
