= Jaroslav Rygl =

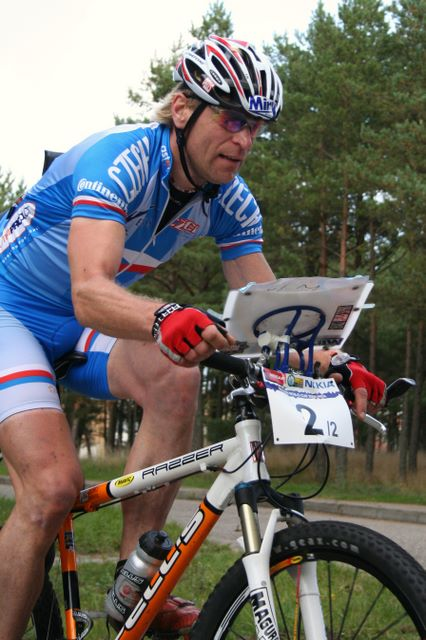

Personal information
- Born: 11 May 1970 (age 56)

Sport
- Sport: Mountain bike orienteering; Ski orienteering
Medal record
Representing Czech Republic
Men's mountain bike orienteering
World Championships
Silver medal – second place	2005 Banská Bystrica	Middle
Silver medal – second place	2007 Nové Město na Moravě	Relay
Bronze medal – third place	2007 Nové Město na Moravě	Long
Bronze medal – third place	2008 Ostróda	Relay
European Championships
Silver medal – second place	2007 Castelfiorentino	Long

Jaroslav Rygl (born 11 May 1970) is a Czech mountain bike orienteer and ski orienteering competitor. He won a silver medal in the middle distance at the 2005 World MTB Orienteering Championships in Banská Bystrica, and a bronze medal in the long distance at the 2007 World MTB Orienteering Championships in Nové Město na Moravě. With the Czech relay team he won medals at the 2007 and 2008 World MTB Orienteering Championships.
