= Torbjørn Gasbjerg =

Danish mountain bike orienteer

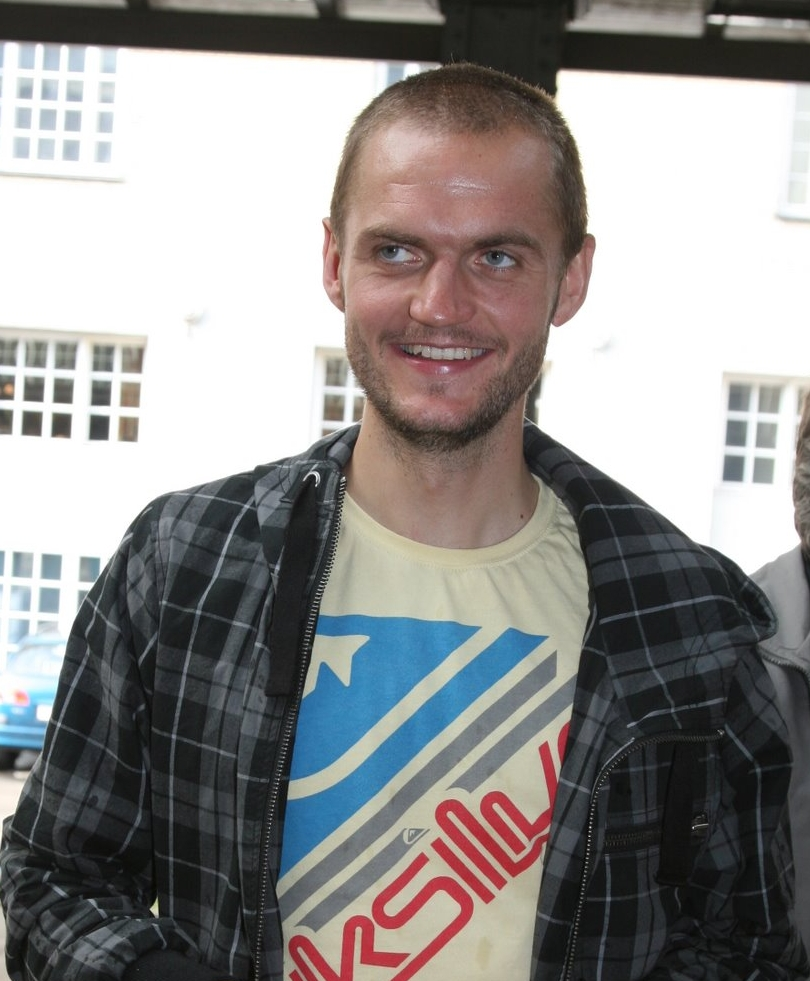

Medal record

Representing Denmark

Men's mountain bike orienteering

World Championships
Gold medal – first place	2007 Nové Město na Moravě	Sprint
Gold medal – first place	2008 Ostróda	Relay
Gold medal – first place	2009 Ben Shemen	Middle
Silver medal – second place	2008 Ostróda	Long
Bronze medal – third place	2007 Nové Město na Moravě	Relay

Torbjørn Gasbjerg (born 21 August 1980) is a Danish mountain bike orienteering competitor and World Champion. He won an individual gold medal at the 2007 World MTB Orienteering Championships, a gold medal in the relay in 2008, and a gold medal in the middle distance in 2009.
