= Tuomo Tompuri =

Finnish mountain bike orienteer

Medal record

Representing Finland

Men's mountain bike orienteering

World Championships
Gold medal – first place	2006 Joensuu	Middle
Gold medal – first place	2006 Joensuu	Relay

Tuomo Tompuri (born 23 June 1976) is a Finnish mountain bike orienteering competitor and World Champion. He won an individual gold medal at the 2006 World Mountain Bike Orienteering Championships, and a gold medal in the relay.
