= Ursina Jäggi =

Swiss mountain bike orienteering competitor

Medal record

Representing Switzerland

Women's mountain bike orienteering

World Championships
Gold medal – first place	2012 Veszprém	Middle

Ursina Jäggi is a Swiss mountain bike orienteering competitor and World Champion. She won an individual gold medal at the 2012 World MTB Orienteering Championships,
