= Ramūnas =

- Gender: Male
- Language: Lithuanian
- Name day: 12 June

Origin
- Meaning: "calm"
- Region of origin: Lithuania

Ramūnas is a Lithuanian masculine given name. It is derived from the Lithuanian word ramus, meaning "calm". People with the name Ramūnas include:

- Ramūnas Butautas (born 1964), Lithuanian basketball player and coach
- Ramūnas Karbauskis (born 1969), Lithuanian businessman and politician
- Ramūnas Navardauskas (born 1988), Lithuanian professional road racing cyclist
- Ramūnas Radavičius (born 1981), Lithuanian footballer
- Ramūnas Šiškauskas (born 1978), Lithuanian basketball player
- Ramūnas Stonkus (born 1970), Lithuanian footballer
- Ramūnas Vyšniauskas (born 1976), Lithuanian weightlifter

== See also ==
- Ramunė, Lithuanian female given name
