= Viktor Korchagin =

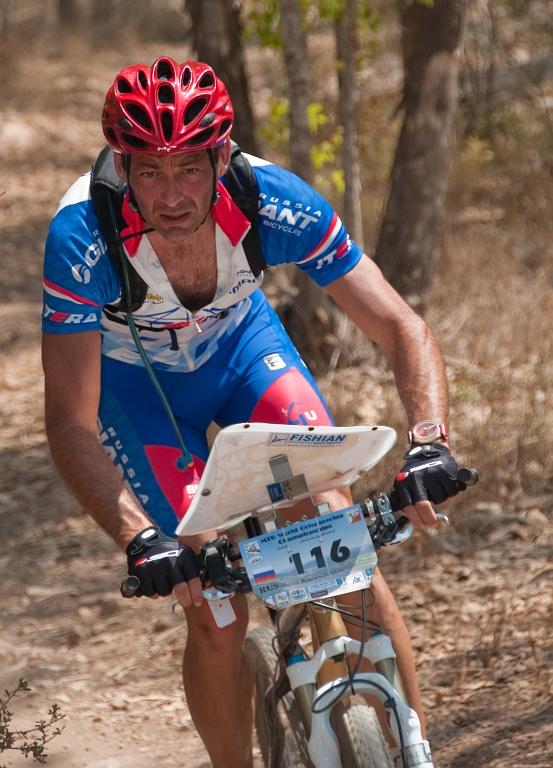
- V.Korchagin at MTB-WOC 2009 in Israel

Medal record

Representing Russia

Men's ski orienteering

World Championships
Gold medal – first place	1998 Windischgarsten	Long
Gold medal – first place	1998 Windischgarsten	Relay
Gold medal – first place	2000 Krasnoyarsk	Relay
Gold medal – first place	2002 Borovetz	Relay
Silver medal – second place	1992 Pontarlier	Relay
Silver medal – second place	2002 Borovetz	Sprint
Bronze medal – third place	1994 Val di Non	Relay

Men's Mountain bike orienteering

World MTB Orienteering Championships
Silver medal – second place	2005 Banská Bystrica	Long
Silver medal – second place	2006 Joensuu	Relay
Bronze medal – third place	2004 Ballarat, Australia	Middle

Viktor Stanislavovich Korchagin (Russian: Виктор Станиславович Корчагин; born 7 August 1967 in Novy Afon, GSSR, Soviet Union) is a Russian ski-orienteering competitor and world champion. He received a gold medal in the long distance at the 1998 World Ski Orienteering Championships in Windischgarsten.
