= Lubomír Tomeček =

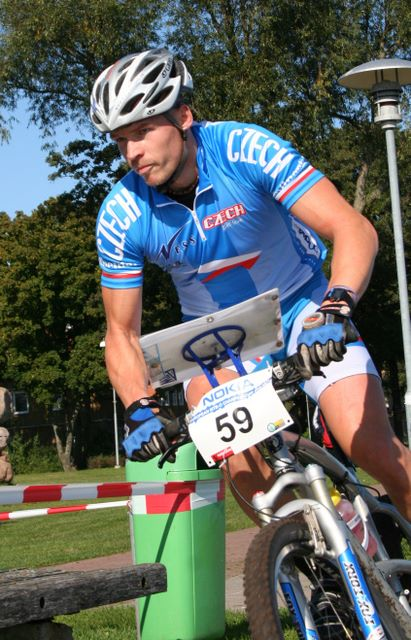

Personal information
- Born: 1979 (age 46–47)

Sport
- Sport: Mountain bike orienteering; Ski orienteering
Medal record
Representing Czech Republic
Men's mountain bike orienteering
World Championships
Bronze medal – third place	2007 Nové Město na Moravě	Middle
Silver medal – second place	2007 Nové Město na Moravě	Relay
Bronze medal – third place	2008 Ostróda	Middle
Bronze medal – third place	2008 Ostróda	Relay
Silver medal – second place	2009 Ben Shemen	Relay

Lubomír Tomeček (born 1979) is a Czech mountain bike orienteer and ski orienteer. He won a bronze medal in the middle distance at the 2007 World MTB Orienteering Championships in Nové Město na Moravě, and a bronze medal at the 2008 World MTB Orienteering Championships in Ostróda. With the Czech relay team he won medals at the 2007, 2008 and 2009 World MTB Orienteering Championships.
