= 2022 European MTB Orienteering Championships =

2022 European MTB Championships
- Venue: Lithuanian Winter Sports Centre
- Location: Ignalina, Lithuania
- Dates: 18–22 May

The 2022 European MTB Orienteering Championships was held from 18 to 22 May 2022 in Ignalina, Lithuania.

== Medal summary ==
=== Medal table ===
* Host nation (Lithuania)

Rank	Nation	Gold	Silver	Bronze	Total
1	Czech Republic	2	1	1	4
2	Denmark	1	2	0	3
3	Lithuania*	1	0	0	1
3	Switzerland	1	0	0	1
5	Finland	0	1	1	2
6	Austria	0	1	0	1
7	Sweden	0	0	3	3
Totals (7 entries)		5	5	5	15

=== Men ===
Event	Gold		Silver		Bronze	
Sprint	Vojtech Ludvik; Czech Republic	24:17	Morten Oernhagen; Denmark	24:39	Marcus Jansson; Sweden	24:53
Long distance	Simon Braendli; Switzerland	1:46:43	Samuel Pokala; Finland	1:47:42	Jiri Hradil; Czech Republic	1:47:54

=== Women ===
Event	Gold		Silver		Bronze	
Sprint	Camilla Soegaard; Denmark	25:00	Martina Tichovska; Czech Republic	25:05	Marika Hara; Finland	25:44
Long distance	Gabrielė Andrašiūnienė; Lithuania	1:42:13	Nikoline Splittorff; Denmark	1:44:04	Anna Tiderman; Sweden	1:45:37

=== Mixed ===
Event	Gold		Silver		Bronze	
Relay	Czech Republic	1:55:28	Austria	+2:06	Sweden	+3:45

== Participanting countries ==
A total of 107 competitors and 14 officials from the national teams of the following 18 countries was registered to compete at 2022 European Championships

- Austria (8)
- Czech Republic (11)
- Denmark (7)
- Estonia (10)
- Finland (17)
- France (7)
- Germany (3)
- Great Britain (2)
- Italy (3)
- Latvia (4)
- Lithuania (9)
- Poland (3)
- Portugal (1)
- Slovakia (1)
- Spain (5)
- Sweden (8)
- Switzerland (7)
- Ukraine (1)
