= Sonja Zinkl =

Austrian mountain bike orienteer

Medal record

Representing Austria

Women's mountain bike orienteering

World Championships
| Gold medal – first place | 2009 Ben Shemen | Relay |
| Silver medal – second place | 2009 Ben Shemen | Long |

Sonja Zinkl is an Austrian mountain bike orienteer. At the 2009 World MTB Orienteering Championships in Ben Shemen, she won a silver medal in the long distance, and a gold medal in the relay, together with Elisabeth Hohenwarter and Michaela Gigon.
