= Ruslan Gritsan =

Russian skier and mountain orienteer (born 1978)

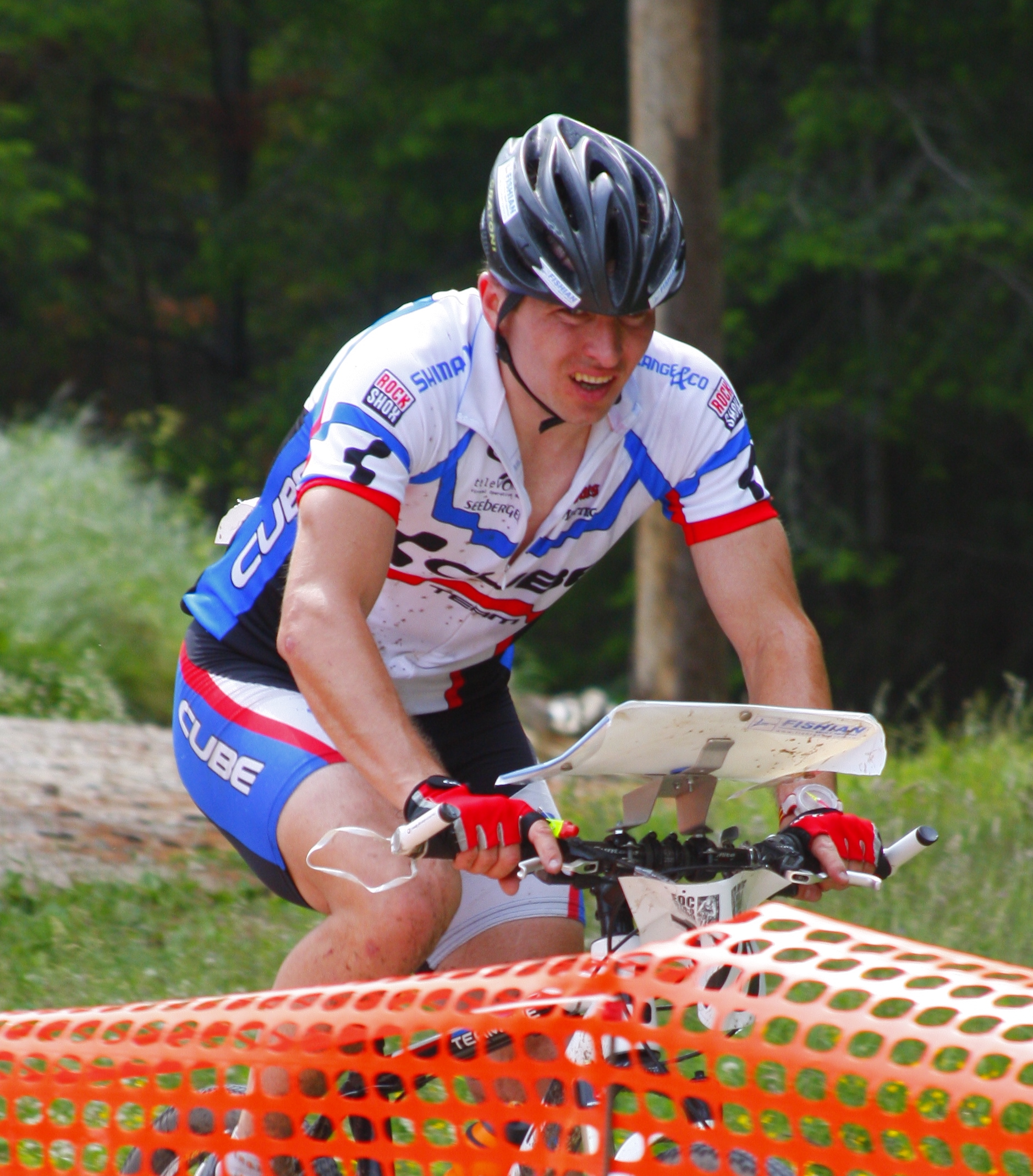
- Gritsan at EMTBOC 2009

Personal information
- Born: 7 December 1978 (age 47) Moscow, Russian SFSR, Soviet Union

Sport
- Sport: Orienteering
Medal record
Representing Russia
Men's ski orienteering
World Ski Orienteering Championships
Gold medal – first place	2002 Borovets	Relay
Gold medal – first place	2004 Åsarna-Östersund	Relay
Gold medal – first place	2005 Levi	Short
Gold medal – first place	2005 Levi	Relay
Junior World Championships
Gold medal – first place	1998	Classic
Gold medal – first place	1998	Short
Men's mountain bike orienteering
World MTB Orienteering Championships
Gold medal – first place	2005 Banská Bystrica	Long
Gold medal – first place	2005 Banská Bystrica	Middle
Gold medal – first place	2007 Nové Město na Moravě	Long
Gold medal – first place	2008 Ostróda	Long
Gold medal – first place	2009 Ben Shemen	Relay
Gold medal – first place	2010 Montalegre	Relay
Gold medal – first place	2012 Veszprém	Long
Silver medal – second place	2006 Joensuu	Long
Silver medal – second place	2006 Joensuu	Relay
Silver medal – second place	2008 Ostróda	Relay
Silver medal – second place	2009 Ben Shemen	Long
Silver medal – second place	2011 Vicenza	Middle
Silver medal – second place	2012 Veszprém	Relay
Bronze medal – third place	2006 Joensuu	Relay
Bronze medal – third place	2009 Ben Shemen	Sprint
Bronze medal – third place	2011 Vicenza	Long
Bronze medal – third place	2012 Veszprém	Sprint
European MTB Orienteering Championships
Gold medal – first place	2009 Hillerød	Sprint
Silver medal – second place	2011 Saint Petersburg	Relay
Bronze medal – third place	2008 Nida	Sprint
Bronze medal – third place	2008 Nida	Long

Ruslan Gritsan (born 7 December 1978) is a Russian competitor and multiple world champion in both ski-orienteering and mountain bike orienteering.

== Ski orienteering career ==
At the 1998 Junior World Ski Orienteering Championships, Gritsan won gold medals in both the classic distance and the short distance events.

He won a gold medal in the short distance at the 2005 World Ski Orienteering Championships in Levi, sharing the honor with Andrei Gruzdev. Gritsan also won gold medals in the relay with the Russian team in 2002, 2004 and 2005. In 2002, the Russian team, comprising Andrei Gruzdev, Gritsan, Viktor Korchagin and Eduard Khrennikov, won gold ahead of Finland. The 2004 team, consisting of Vasily Glukharev, Andrei Gruzdev, Gritsan and Eduard Khrennikov, won golf ahead of the Norwegian team. In 2005, Gruzdev, Gritsan and Khrennikov won the relay gold medal ahead of Finland.

== Mountain bike orienteering career ==
At the 2004 World MTB Orienteering Championships in Ballarat, Gritslan placed tenth in the middle, 32nd in the long, and sixth in the relay event. At the 2005 World Championships in Banská Bystrica, he won gold medals in both the middle and long distances, and finished fourth with the Russian relay team. In 2006, at the Championships in Joensuu, Gritslan won a bronze medal in the middle distance, a silver medal in the long distance, and a silver medal in the relay with the Russian team, behind Finland. At the 2007 World MTB Orienteering Championships in Nové Město na Moravě, he won a gold medal in the long distance, placed fourth in the sprint, 57th in the middle distance, and fourth in the relay. At the 2008 World MTB Orienteering Championships in Ostróda, he won a gold medal in the long distance and a silver medal in the relay. In 2009, in Ben Shemen, he won a silver medal in the long distance, a bronze medal in the sprint, and a gold medal in the relay. At the 2010 World Championships in Montalegre, he won a gold medal with the Russian relay team, together with Valeriy Gluhov and Anton Foliforov. He placed fourth in the middle distance, and tenth in the long distance.
