= Luca Dallavalle =

Italian mountain bike orienteer

Personal information
- Born: 14 July 1987 (age 38) Cles, Italy

Sport
- Sport: Mountain bike orienteering; Extreme skiing
Medal record
Representing Italy
Men's mountain bike orienteering
World Championships
Bronze medal – third place	2010 Montalegre	Middle
Gold medal – first place	2015 Liberec	Sprint
Silver medal – second place	2015 Liberec	Middle
Bronze medal – third place	2015 Liberec	Long

Luca Dallavalle (born 14 July 1987) is an Italian mountain bike orienteer. He won a bronze medal in the middle distance at the 2010 World MTB Orienteering Championships in Montalegre. 5 years later, at the 2015 World MTB Orienteering Championships in Liberec, he won 3 medals: one gold, one silver and one bronze, respectively on the sprint, middle and long distance races. In June 2016 he's on the top of males world ranking of MTB-O.

Dallavalle practises also extreme skiing. He skied many classical lines in Dolomites, Adamello-Presanella, Ortles-Cevedale in Alps and he found new extreme descent lines from the same mountains.
