= Jiří Hradil (orienteer) =

Czech mountain bike orienteer

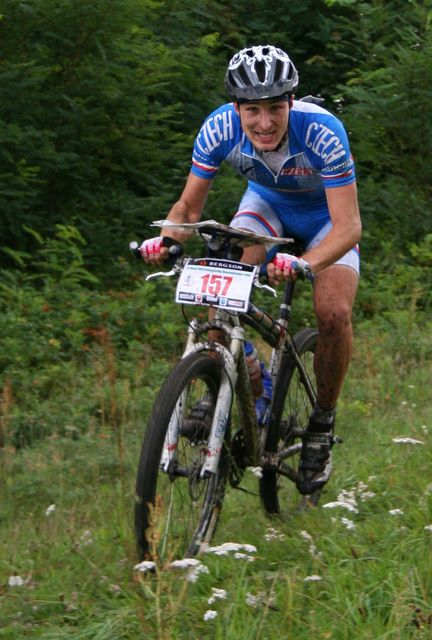

Personal information
- Born: 1986 (age 39–40)

Sport
- Sport: Mountain bike orienteering
Medal record
Representing the Czech Republic
Men's mountain bike orienteering
World Championships
Silver medal – second place	2008 Ostróda	Sprint
Silver medal – second place	2009 Ben Shemen	Middle
Silver medal – second place	2009 Ben Shemen	Relay
Silver medal – second place	2011 Italy - Alonte	Relay
Silver medal – second place	2011 Italy - Sossano	Sprint
European Championships
Bronze medal – third place	2022 Ignalina	Long

Jiří Hradil (born 1986) is a Czech mountain bike orienteer. He won a silver medal in the sprint event at the 2008 World MTB Orienteering Championships in Ostróda. At the 2009 World MTB Orienteering Championships in Ben Shemen he won a silver medal in the middle distance, and a silver medal with the Czech relay team.
