= Jussi Mäkilä =

Finnish mountain bike orienteer

Medal record

Representing Finland

Men's mountain bike orienteering

World Championships
Gold medal – first place	2002 Fontainebleau	Sprint
Gold medal – first place	2004 Ballarat	Relay
Gold medal – first place	2005 Banská Bystrica	Relay
Gold medal – first place	2006 Joensuu	Relay
Bronze medal – third place	2002 Fontainebleau	Relay

Jussi Mäkilä (born 10 September 1974) is a Finnish mountain bike orienteering competitor and World Champion. He won an individual gold medal at the 2002 World MTB Orienteering Championships, and gold medals in the relay in 2004, 2005 and 2006.
