= Hana Bajtošová =

Slovak mountain bike orienteer (born 1984)

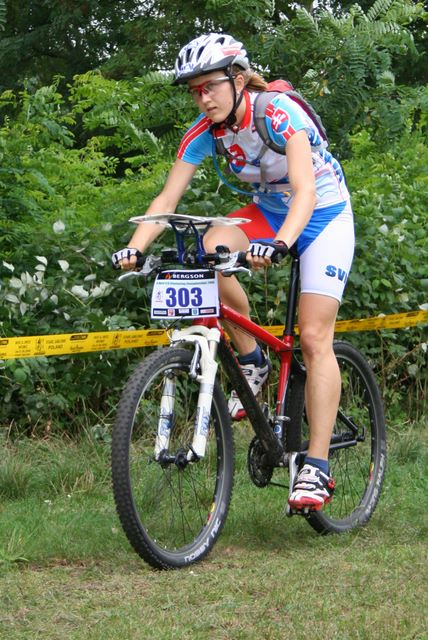

Personal information
- Nationality: Slovak

Sport
- Sport: MTB Orienteering
Medal record
Representing Slovakia
Women's mountain bike orienteering
World Championships
Gold medal – first place	2008 Ostróda	Sprint
Gold medal – first place	2009 Ben Shemen	Sprint
Silver medal – second place	2006 Joensuu	Middle
Silver medal – second place	2007 Nové Město na Moravě	Middle
Bronze medal – third place	2007 Nové Město na Moravě	Sprint
Bronze medal – third place	2009 Ben Shemen	Long

Hana Bajtošová (born 5 March 1984) is a Slovak mountain bike orienteering competitor and World Champion. She won an individual gold medal at the 2008 and 2009 World MTB Orienteering Championships.
