= Markéta Jirásková =

Czech mountain bike orienteer

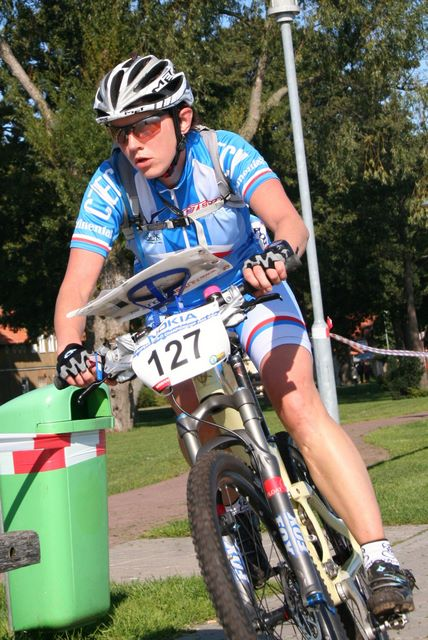

Medal record

Representing Czech Republic

Women's mountain bike orienteering

World Championships
Bronze medal – third place	2007 Nové Město na Moravě	Middle

Markéta Jirásková is a Czech mountain bike orienteer. She won a bronze medal in the middle distance at the 2007 World MTB Orienteering Championships in Nové Město na Moravě. She placed 8th in the long distance, and 14th in the sprint event.
