= Tõnis Erm =

Estonian mountain bike orienteer

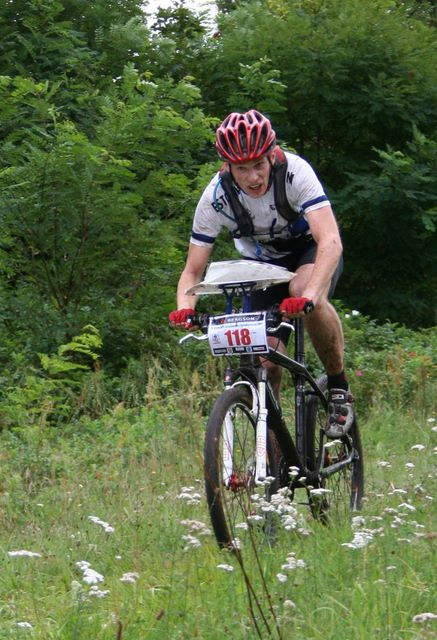

Personal information
- Born: 18 January 1982 (age 44) Tallinn, then part of Estonian SSR, Soviet Union
Medal record
Tõnis Erm
Medal record
Representing Estonia
Men's mountain bike orienteering
World Championships
Bronze medal – third place	2008 Ostróda	Sprint
Silver medal – second place	2010 Montalegre	Sprint
Gold medal – first place	2013 Rakvere	Sprint
Gold medal – first place	2013 Rakvere	Middle
Bronze medal – third place	2013 Rakvere	Relay
Gold medal – first place	2014 Belastok	Relay
European Championships
Silver medal – second place	2008 Nida	Sprint
Silver medal – second place	2008 Nida	Middle
Silver medal – second place	2009 Hillerod	Relay

Tõnis Erm (born 18 January 1982 in Tallinn) is an Estonian mountain bike orienteer. At the 2008 World MTB Orienteering Championships in Ostróda, he won a bronze medal in the sprint event. In Ben Shemen in 2009 he won a silver medal in the sprint.
