= Wadephul =

Wadephul is a surname. Notable people with the surname include:

- Johann Wadephul (born 1963), German politician, Federal Minister of Foreign Affairs (since 2025)
- Ralf Wadephul (born 1958), German keyboardist and composer
