= Tatiana Repina =

Play by Anton Chekhov

- Author: Anton Chekhov
- Original title: Russian: Татьяна Репина
- Language: Russian
- Genre: Drama
- Publisher: Athenaeum, Petrograd
- Publication date: 1924
- Publication place: Russia
- Preceded by: The Wedding (1889)
- Followed by: The Wood Demon (1889)

Tatiana Repina (Russian: Татьяна Репина) is a one-act drama by Anton Chekhov, written in 1889, as a sequel to Alexey Suvorin's play Tatiana Repina, with the dedication to the author. The play was written as a private joke from Chekhov to his friend Suvorin and it was not published or performed in Chekhov's lifetime. The only printed copy was discovered among Suvorin's papers in 1912, after his death. Chekhov's Tatyana Repina was published for the first time in 1924.

== Background ==
In November 1881 Russia was shocked by the death of the young actress Yevlaliya Kadmina, who, while being engaged in the leading role of Vasilissa Melentyeva, the play by Alexander Ostrovsky, spotted her estranged fiance in the audience with his new girl, went to take poison during the break, then collapsed on stage and six days later died in hospital. Among the several authors who felt inspired enough to recreate this story in their work (Ivan Turgenev and Alexander Kuprin included) was Alexey Suvorin, whose drama Tatyana Repina, premiered at the Alexandrinka in St Petersburg in December 1888 and at the Moscow's Maly Theatre on 16 January 1889. Chekhov was friends with Suvorin and actively participated in the production of his "Tatyana Repina" play in Moscow.

== History ==
Chekhov's version of "Tatiana Repina" (which features the same characters but a different plotline) tells the story of a church wedding of Olenina and Sabinin, and the hysteria in the crowd of "The Lady in Black", who was mistaken for Tatiana Repina (the actress who dies of poison in the final act of Suvorin's drama). The demonstration of a religious service on stage made the publication of Chekhov's play impossible.

== Characters ==
- Olenina
- Kokoshkina
- Matveyev
- Sonenstein
- Sabinin
- Kotelnikov
- Kokoshkin
- Patronnikov
- Volgin, a young officer
- Student
- Young lady
- Father Ivan, cathedral archpriest, and old man of 70 years
- Father Nicholas
- Father Alexey
- Deacon
- Sexton
- Kuzma, the church watchman.
- The Lady in Black
- Prosecutor
- Actors and actresses
