= Olga Vinogradova =

Russian neuroscientist

Professor Olga S. Vinogradova (1929–2001) was a specialist in Russian cognitive neuroscience. In 1969 she founded the Laboratory of Systemic Organization of Neurons in the Institute of Biological Physics, Russian Academy of Sciences (Pushchino) and headed this Laboratory till the end of her life.

From the early days of her scientific career, Prof. Vinogradova was fortunate to work with prominent neuropsychologist and neuroscientists. She studied psychology under the supervision of Prof. Alexander Luria, investigated psychophysiology of the orienting reflex with Prof. Evgeny Sokolov, and learned electrophysiology from Prof. Jan Bures.

On the basis of extracellular unit recording from the hippocampus and other relevant structures in awake animals during sensory and electrical stimulation, she developed a hypothesis of information processing in the limbic system. She concluded that the hippocampus is at the core of orienting reflex and works as a comparator determining whether information should be stored in memory (if it is new) or ignored (if it is old). These ideas were developed in her books Orienting Reflex and Its Neurophysiological Mechanisms (Moskva, 1962) and Hippocampus and Memory (Nauka, 1975), and later published in English as a chapter of the book Hippocampus (Plenum Press, 1984) and the review Hippocampus as a comparator system (Hippocampus, 2001, v. 11:578-98).

A significant part of Prof. Vinogradova’s scientific career was devoted to the analysis of the role of theta rhythm in hippocampal function. She and her co-workers presented evidence that the ability to generate the theta-rhythm is an intrinsic property of the medial septum nucleus and the nucleus of the diagonal band of Broca (Progr. Neurobiol. 1995, v.37: 523-83). Prof. Vinogradova contributed extensive time and effort to support of international relations of Soviet and Russian neuroscience. In 1958 she was a member of the Organizing Committee of the Moscow Symposium of Neurobiology to which Western neuroscientists were invited to the Soviet Union for the first time. This Symposium could be considered the beginning of collaborative relations between neuroscientists from the Soviet Union and other countries.

Prof. Vinogradova was an internationally influential neuroscientist. In 1979 she received the Kenneth Craik award from St. John’s College, Cambridge (UK), for contributions to the understanding of hippocampal functions.

She was a member of IBRO since its foundation and a member of the European Science Foundation and a member of the editorial board of several scientific journals. She was invited as lecturer to scientific institutions worldwide.

== Main publications ==
1. Vinogradova O.S. Registration of information and the limbic system // In G. Horn and R.A. Hinde (Eds.) Short-term changes in neural activity and behaviour. Cambridge: University Press. 1970. 95 – 140.
2. Vinogradova O.S. Functional organization of the limbic system in the process of registration of information: facts and hypotheses // Volume 2: Neurophysiology and behavior / In R.L. Isaacson and K.H. Pribram (Eds.) The Hippocampus. N.Y. and London: Plenum Press. 1975. 3 – 70.
3. Vinogradova O.C., Zhuravleva Z.N., Bragin A. Organization of the nervous tissue (hippocampus and septum) developing in the anterior eye chamber. 1. General characteristics and non-neural elements // J. Hirnforsch. 1984. 25: 313 – 30.
4. Vinogradova O.S. Expression, control, and probable functional significance of the neuronal theta-rhythm // Progress in Neurobiol. 1995. 45: 523 – 83.
5. Vinogradova O.S., Kitchigina V.F., Zenchenko C.I. Pacemaker neurons of the forebrain medical septal area and theta rhythm of the hippocampus // Membr Cell Biol. 1998. 11: 715 – 25.
6. Borisyuk R., Dencham M., Kazanovich Ja., Hoppenstedt F., Vinogradova O.S. Oscillatory model of novelty detection // Network: Comput. Neural. Syst. 2000. 11: 1 – 20.
7. Vinogradova O.S. Neuroscience at the end of the 2nd millennium: a shift in paradigms // Zh Vyssh Nerv Deiat Im I P Pavlova. 2000. 50: 743 – 74. (in Russian)
8. Vinogradova O.S. Hippocampus as Comparator: Role of the Two Input and Two Output Systems of the Hippocampus in Selection and Registration of Information // Hippocampus. 2001. 11: 578 – 598.
