= Rikke Kornvig =

Danish mountain bike orienteer (born 1983)

Medal record

Representing Denmark

Women's mountain bike orienteering

World Championships
Gold medal – first place	2010 Montalegre	Relay
Silver medal – second place	2010 Montalegre	Middle

Rikke Kornvig (born 1983) is a Danish mountain bike orienteer. She won a silver medal in the middle distance, and a gold medal with the Danish relay team at the 2010 World MTB Orienteering Championships in Montalegre.
