= Emily Benham =

British mountain bike orienteering athlete

Emily Benham Kvåle
Personal information
- Born: 1989 (age 35–36)

Sport
- Team: Hadeland CK

Emily Benham Kvåle (born 1989) is a British mountain bike orienteering athlete. She is considered the world's all-time best female MTBO athlete.

Benham Kvåle has won ten individual World Championship gold medals (two in 2016, two in 2017, four in 2019, one in 2022 and one in 2023), has won the World Cup overall for four consecutive years (2014–2017) and a fifth title in 2019, and has held three European Champion titles. She holds more individual World Cup wins and titles than any other MTBO athlete, male or female, and holds first place in the all-time individual WMTBOC medal table.

In 2019, 7 months after the birth of her first child, Benham Kvåle won all four individual races at the World Championships in Denmark, becoming the first athlete to win all four titles in a single championship.

After two seasons (and nearly 3 years) away from domestic and international MTBO, due to the COVID-19 pandemic and a second child, Benham Kvåle returned in 2022 to win a fourth long distance World Championship title equalling the record set by Christine Schaffner in 2010.

== Career ==
Started Mountain Bike Orienteering (MTBO) in 2007 after having orienteered since the age of 11. She has a degree in Physiotherapy from Sheffield Hallam University and is currently living in Norway.

Competitive career highlights to date include four top 6 results from Junior World Championships in 2008/2009 and ten World MTB Orienteering Championships gold medals (2016 sprint and long, 2017 mass start and long, 2019 sprint, middle, mass start and long, 2022 long, 2023 middle). She became the first person to defend a long-distance world title since 2010. Benham holds ten World Championship titles, 9 silver medals and 3 bronze medals, making her the most successful MTBO athlete in recent years. In 2019 she medalled in every individual World Championship race she started.

== Sources ==
- Interview
