= Laure Coupat =

French mountain bike cyclist (born 1976)

Medal record

Representing France

Women's mountain bike orienteering

World Championships
Gold medal – first place	2002 Fontainebleau	Sprint
Silver medal – second place	2002 Fontainebleau	Relay
Silver medal – second place	2004 Ballarat	Middle

Laure Coupat (born 3 April 1976) is a French mountain bike orienteering competitor and World Champion. She won an individual gold medal in sprint at the 2002 World MTB Orienteering Championships, and a silver medal in the relay with the French team.
