= Grigory Medvedev =

Soviet sprint canoer

Medal record

Men's canoe sprint

Representing Soviet Union

World Championships
Gold medal – first place	1986 Montreal	K-4 10000 m

Grigoriy Medvedyev (born 2 April 1964 in Alma-Ata, Kazakh SSR) is a Soviet sprint canoer who competed in the late 1980s. He won a gold medal in the K-4 10000 m event at the 1986 ICF Canoe Sprint World Championships in Montreal.
