= Jindřich Jirásek =

Czech footballer (born 1973)

Personal information
- Date of birth: 19 September 1973 (age 53)
- Height: 1.76 m (5 ft 9 in)
- Position: Defender

Senior career*
Years	Team	Apps	(Gls)
1994–1995	Slavia Praha		
1996–2001	Chmel Blšany		
1999–2000	→ Spolana Neratovice (loan)		
2001–2002	Vysočina Jihlava		
2002–2006	Xaverov		
2006	Dragoun Břevnov		
2006–2008	Dukla Praha		
2008–2009	Xaverov		
2009–2013	Zbuzany 1953		

Managerial career
- 2019: Zbuzany 1953
- * Club domestic league appearances and goals

Jindřich Jirásek (born 9 September 1973) is a retired Czech football defender.
