= Jan Tomeček =

Czech ice hockey player

- Born: 27 June 1990 (age 35) Tábor, Czechoslovakia
- Height: 5 ft 11 in (180 cm)
- Weight: 183 lb (83 kg; 13 st 1 lb)
- Position: Defence
- Shot: Left
- Played for: HC Karlovy Vary
- Playing career: 2011–2020

Jan Tomeček (born 27 June 1990) is a Czech former professional ice hockey defenceman.

Tomeček played 104 games in the Czech Extraliga for HC Karlovy Vary from 2014 to 2018. He also played on loan for SK Kadaň, HC Most and HC Baník Sokolov. He retired on 16 April 2020 due to health problems.
