= Ivan Sirakov =

Bulgarian orienteering competitor

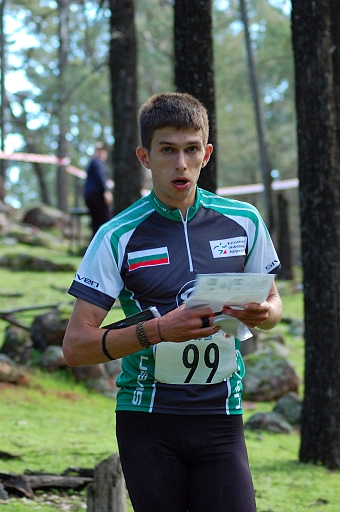
- Sirakov at JWOC 2007

Medal record

Men's orienteering

Representing Bulgaria

Junior World Championships
Bronze medal – third place	2007 Dubbo	Sprint

Ivan Sirakov (Bulgarian: Иван Сираков) (born January 2, 1988) is a Bulgarian orienteering competitor from Veliko Tarnovo, who has competed for Bulgaria at two World Orienteering Championships, in 2007 and in 2008. He earned a bronze medal at the Junior World Orienteering Championships.

== Junior career ==
Sirakov competed at the 2007 Junior World Orienteering Championships in Dubbo, where he received a bronze medal in sprint, finishing 24 seconds behind the winner. This was the first medal for Bulgaria in the history of junior world orienteering championships.

He finished 7th in the relay with the Bulgarian team.

== Senior career ==
He represented Bulgaria at the World Orienteering Championships in Kyiv in 2007, where the Bulgarian relay team finished 18th.

While still being a junior, he competed at the senior world championships in Olomouc in 2008, where he missed the sprint final by only one second in the qualifications.

== Awards ==
Sirakov was voted Veliko Tarnovo's sportsperson of the year 2007.

== See also ==
- Bulgarian orienteers
- List of orienteers
- List of orienteering events
