= Kryštof Bogar =

Czech mountain bike orienteer

Medal record

Representing Czech Republic

Men's mountain bike orienteering

World Championships
Gold medal – first place	2013 Rakvere	Long
Gold medal – first place	2017 Vilnius	Middle
Silver medal – second place	2016 Águeda	Long
Bronze medal – third place	2013 Rakvere	Sprint

Kryštof Bogar is a Czech mountain bike orienteering competitor and World Champion. He won a gold medal and a bronze medal at the 2013 World MTB Orienteering Championships.
