= World Mountain Bike Orienteering Championships =

International mountain bike competitions

- Status: active
- Genre: sports competition
- Date: July–August
- Frequency: annual
- Location: various
- Inaugurated: 2002
- Organiser: IOF

The World Mountain Bike Orienteering Championships is the official event for awarding World Champion titles in mountain bike orienteering. The World Championships, also known as WMTBOC, were first held in 2002, and since 2004 they have been organized annually – except in 2020. The programme includes Long distance, Middle distance, Sprint, Mass Start (unofficial in 2016 and official from 2017), and a Relay for both men and women.

== Host towns and cities ==
Below is a list of towns and cities that have hosted World Championships in mountain bike orienteering. Year, date, place and number of participating countries are shown.

Year	Date	Place	# Countries	Notes
2002	1–6 July	Fontainebleau, France	29	
2004	19–23 October	Ballarat, Australia	26	
2005	5–11 September	Banská Bystrica, Slovakia	26	
2006 (in conjunction with TrailO WTOC 2006)	9–13 July	Joensuu, Finland	25	
2007	5–12 August	Nové Město na Moravě, Czech Republic	22	
2008	24–31 August	Ostróda, Poland	26	
2009	9–16 August	Ben Shemen, Israel	20	
2010	11–17 July	Montalegre, Portugal	25	
2011	20–28 August	Vicenza, Italy	27	
2012	20–25 August	Veszprém, Hungary	30	
2013	26–31 August	Rakvere, Estonia	26	
2014	24–31 August	Białystok, Poland	27	
2015	14–23 August	Liberec, Czech Republic	28	
2016	24–30 July	Águeda, Portugal	22	
2017	19–27 August	Vilnius, Lithuania	23	
2018	5–12 August	Zwettl, Austria	27	
2019	28 July–3 August	Viborg, Denmark	24	
2020	17–22 August*	Jeseník, Czech Republic		cancelled
2021	10–18 June	Kuortane, Finland	16	
2022	15–20 July	Falun, Sweden	25	

== Long distance ==
=== Men ===
Year	Gold	Silver	Bronze	Notes
2002	(Finland) Jussi Mäkilä	(France) Jérémie Gillmann	(Switzerland) Alain Berger	
2004	(Switzerland) Alain Berger	(Finland) Mika Tervala	(Australia) Adrian Jackson	
2005	(Russia) Ruslan Gritsan	(Russia) Victor Korchagin	(Australia) Adrian Jackson	
2006	(Finland) Mika Tervala	(Russia) Ruslan Gritsan	(Finland) Matti Keskinarkaus	
2007	(Russia) Ruslan Gritsan	(Denmark) Lasse Brun Pedersen	(Czech Republic) Jaroslav Rygl	
2008	(Russia) Ruslan Gritsan	(Denmark) Torbjørn Gasbjerg	(Switzerland) Beat Okle	
2009	(Australia) Adrian Jackson	(Russia) Ruslan Gritsan	(France) Matthieu Barthelemy	
2010	(Russia) Anton Foliforov	(Australia) Adrian Jackson	(Denmark) Erik Skovgaard Knudsen	
2011	(Finland) Samuli Saarela	(Denmark) Erik Skovgaard Knudsen	(Russia) Ruslan Gritsan	
2012	(Russia) Ruslan Gritsan	(Finland) Juho Saarinen	(Finland) Samuel Pokala	Length 29.3 km, Climb 310m, 29 controls
2013	(Czech Republic) Kryštof Bogar	(Finland) Samuli Saarela	(Russia) Anton Foliforov	Length 34.9 km, Climb 405m, 32 controls
2014	(Russia) Anton Foliforov	(France) Baptiste Fuchs	(Czech Republic) Jiří Hradil	
2015	(Russia) Anton Foliforov	(Finland) Jussi Laurila	(Italy) Luca Dallavalle	
2016	(Russia) Anton Foliforov	(Czech Republic) Kryštof Bogar	(Portugal) Davide Machado	
2017	(Denmark) Rasmus Soegaard	(Czech Republic) Jiří Hradil	(Russia) Anton Foliforov	
2018	(Czech Republic) Kryštof Bogar	(Switzerland) Simon Braendli	(Russia) Anton Foliforov	
2019	(Russia) Ruslan Gritsan	(France) Baptiste Fuchs	(Russia) Anton Foliforov	
2021	(Finland) Andre Haga	(Finland) Pekka Niemi	(Switzerland) Simon Braendli	

=== Women ===
Year	Gold	Silver	Bronze	Notes
2002	(Finland) Päivi Tommola	(Australia) Emily Viner	(Germany) Antje Bornhak	
2004	(Germany) Anke Dannowski	(Finland) Päivi Tommola	(Germany) Antje Bornhak	
2005	(Finland) Päivi Tommola	(Germany) Antje Bornhak	(Germany) Anke Dannowski	
2006	(Switzerland) Christine Schaffner	(Russia) Ksenia Chernykh	(Finland) Ingrid Stengård	
2007	(Austria) Michaela Gigon	(Russia) Ksenia Chernykh	(Switzerland) Christine Schaffner	
2008	(Switzerland) Christine Schaffner	(Finland) Marika Hara	(Denmark) Line Pedersen	
2009	(Switzerland) Christine Schaffner	(Austria) Sonja Zinkl	(Slovakia) Hana Bajtošová	
2010	(Switzerland) Christine Schaffner	(Russia) Ksenia Chernykh	(Finland) Marika Hara	
2011	(Denmark) Rikke Kornvig	(Finland) Ingrid Stengard	(Italy) Laura Scaravonati	
2012	(Finland) Susanna Laurila	(Russia) Ksenia Chernykh	(Finland) Marika Hara	Length 21.5 km, Climb 250m, 24 controls
2013	(Finland) Marika Hara	(Finland) Susanna Laurila	(Sweden) Cecilia Thomasson	Length 26.0 km, Climb 265m, 27 controls
2014	(Russia) Olga Vinogradova	(Russia) Svetlana Poverina	(Denmark) Camilla Soegaard	
2015	(Czech Republic) Martina Tichovská	(Russia) Svetlana Poverina	(Sweden) Cecilia Thomasson	
2016	(United Kingdom) Emily Benham	(France) Gaëlle Barlet	(Switzerland) Maja Rothweiler	
2017	(United Kingdom) Emily Benham	(Czech Republic) Martina Tichovská	(Russia) Olga Vinogradova	
2018	(Czech Republic) Martina Tichovská	(Finland) Antonia Haga	(Russia) Svetlana Poverina	
2019	(United Kingdom) Emily Benham Kvale	(Czech Republic) Veronika Kubínová	(Lithuania) Gabriele Andrasiuniene	
2021	(Denmark) Camilla Soegaard	(Czech Republic) Veronika Kubínová	(Finland) Marika Hara	

== Middle distance ==
=== Men ===
Year	Gold	Silver	Bronze	Notes
2004	(Australia) Adrian Jackson	(Switzerland) Alain Berger	(Russia) Victor Korchagin	
2005	(Russia) Ruslan Gritsan	(Czech Republic) Jaroslav Rygl	(Finland) Mika Tervala	
2006	(Finland) Tuomo Tompuri	(Finland) Mika Tervala	(Russia) Ruslan Gritsan	
2007	(Finland) Mika Tervala	(France) Jérémie Gillmann	(Czech Republic) Lubomír Tomeček	
2008	(Australia) Adrian Jackson	(Denmark) Søren Strunge	(Czech Republic) Lubomír Tomeček	
2009	(Denmark) Torbjørn Gasbjerg	(Czech Republic) Jiří Hradil	(Denmark) Lasse Brun Pedersen	Length: 20.4 km, Climb: 355 m, 19 controls
2010	(Finland) Samuli Saarela	(Australia) Adrian Jackson	(Italy) Luca Dallavalle	
2011	(Finland) Samuli Saarela	(Russia) Ruslan Gritsan	(Austria) Tobias Breitschadel	
2012	(Finland) Samuli Saarela	(Russia) Anton Foliforov	(Finland) Samuel Pökälä	Length 14.4 km, Climb 240m, 21 controls
2013	(Estonia) Tõnis Erm	(Russia) Anton Foliforov	(Finland) Samuli Saarela	Length 15.6 km, Climb 290m, 24 controls
2014	(Russia) Ruslan Gritsan	(Czech Republic) Jiří Hradil	(Russia) Anton Foliforov	
2015	(Russia) Anton Foliforov	(Italy) Luca Dallavalle	(Czech Republic) Marek Pospíšek	
2016	(Russia) Anton Foliforov	(Czech Republic) Vojtěch Ludvík	(Russia) Ruslan Gritsan	
2017	(Czech Republic) Kryštof Bogar	(Russia) Anton Foliforov	(Russia) Valeriy Gluhov	
2018	(Switzerland) Simon Braendli	(France) Baptiste Fuchs	(Russia) Grigory Medvedev	
2019	(Czech Republic) Vojtěch Ludvík	(Russia) Anton Foliforov	(Russia) Grigory Medvedev	
2021	(Finland) Samuel Pokala	(Switzerland) Simon Braendli	(Czech Republic) Kryštof Bogar	

=== Women ===
Year	Gold	Silver	Bronze	Notes
2004	(Austria) Michaela Gigon	(France) Laure Coupat (Australia) Belinda Allison		
2005	(Austria) Michaela Gigon	(Switzerland) Christine Schaffner	(Lithuania) Ramune Arlauskiene	
2006	(Austria) Michaela Gigon	(Slovakia) Hana Bajtošová	(Finland) Ingrid Stengård	
2007	(Russia) Ksenia Chernykh	(Slovakia) Hana Bajtošová	(Czech Republic) Markéta Jirásková	
2008	(Russia) Ksenia Chernykh	(Austria) Michaela Gigon	(Finland) Päivi Tommola	
2009	(Finland) Marika Hara	(Austria) Michaela Gigon	(Switzerland) Christine Schaffner	Length: 15.6 km, Climb: 225 m, 15 controls
2010	(Austria) Michaela Gigon	(Denmark) Rikke Kornvig	(Finland) Marika Hara	
2011	(Austria) Michaela Gigon	(Poland) Anna Kaminska	(Denmark) Rikke Kornvig	
2012	(Switzerland) Ursina Jäggi	(Finland) Ingrid Stengard	(Denmark) Nina Hoffmann	Length 11.7 km, Climb 205m, 17 controls
2013	(Finland) Marika Hara	(United Kingdom) Emily Benham	(Finland) Susanna Laurila	Length 11.3 km, Climb 200m, 18 controls
2014	(Sweden) Cecilia Thomasson	(United Kingdom) Emily Benham	(Finland) Marika Hara	
2015	(France) Gaelle Barlet	(Czech Republic) Martina Tichovská	(United Kingdom) Emily Benham	
2016	(Russia) Olga Vinogradova	(United Kingdom) Emily Benham	(Denmark) Camilla Soegaard	
2017	(Russia) Olga Vinogradova	(Czech Republic) Martina Tichovská	(United Kingdom) Emily Benham	
2018	(Russia) Olga Vinogradova	(Czech Republic) Martina Tichovská	(Czech Republic) Veronika Kubinova	
2019	(United Kingdom) Emily Benham Kvale	(Czech Republic) Veronika Kubínová	(Finland) Marika Hara	
2021	Svetlana Foliforova*	(Czech Republic) Martina Tichovská	(Finland) Marika Hara	*Neutral athlete, born in Russia

== Sprint ==
=== Men ===
Year	Gold	Silver	Bronze	Notes
2002	(Finland) Mika Tervala	(Switzerland) Alain Berger	(France) Jérémie Gillmann	
2007	(Denmark) Torbjørn Gasbjerg	(France) Jérémie Gillmann	(Russia) Anton Foliforov	
2008	(Denmark) Lasse Brun Pedersen	(Czech Republic) Jiří Hradil	(Estonia) Tõnis Erm	
2009	(Australia) Adrian Jackson	(Denmark) Lasse Brun Pedersen	(Russia) Ruslan Gritsan	
2010	(Australia) Adrian Jackson	(Estonia) Tõnis Erm	(Russia) Anton Foliforov	
2011	(Russia) Anton Foliforov	(Czech Republic) Jiří Hradil	(Denmark) Erik Skovgaard Knudsen	
2012	(Austria) Tobias Breitschädel	(Czech Republic) Marek Pospíšek	(Russia) Ruslan Gritsan	Length 6.9 km, Climb 135m, 20 controls
2013	(Estonia) Tõnis Erm	(Estonia) Lauri Malsroos	(Czech Republic) Kryštof Bogar	Length 6.1 km, Climb 55m, 22 controls
2014	(Norway) Hans Jorgen Kvale (Russia) Anton Foliforov		(Russia) Grigory Medvedev	
2015	(Italy) Luca Dallavalle	(Czech Republic) Vojtěch Stránský	(Estonia) Lauri Malsroos	
2016	(Russia) Anton Foliforov	(Italy) Luca Dallavalle	(France) Cedric Beill	
2017	(Russia) Grigory Medvedev	(Finland) Jussi Laurila	(Estonia) Lauri Malsroos	
2018	(Russia) Anton Foliforov	(Russia) Grigory Medvedev	(Czech Republic) Kryštof Bogar	
2019	(Russia) Grigory Medvedev	(Russia) Anton Foliforov	(France) Yoann Courtois	
2021	(Czech Republic) Kryštof Bogar	(Switzerland) Simon Braendli	Valeriy Glukhov*	*Neutral athlete from Russia

=== Women ===
Year	Gold	Silver	Bronze	Notes
2002	(France) Laure Coupat	(Finland) Mervi Väisänen	(Germany) Antje Bornhak	
2007	(Russia) Ksenia Chernykh	(Austria) Michaela Gigon	(Slovakia) Hana Bajtošová	
2008	(Slovakia) Hana Bajtošová	(Austria) Michaela Gigon	(Czech Republic) Martina Tichovská	
2009	(Slovakia) Hana Bajtošová	(Finland) Marika Hara	(Austria) Michaela Gigon	
2010	(Poland) Anna Kaminska	(Switzerland) Christine Schaffner	(Czech Republic) Martina Tichovská	
2011	(France) Gaelle Barlet	(Finland) Marika Hara	(Austria) Michaela Gigon	
2012	(Switzerland) Christine Schaffner	(United Kingdom) Emily Benham	(Poland) Anna Kaminska	Length 5.1 km, Climb 105m, 17 controls
2013	(Sweden) Cecilia Thomasson	(Finland) Eeva-Liisa Hakala	(Russia) Tatiana Repina	Length 5.7 km, Climb 50m, 21 controls
2014	(Finland) Marika Hara	(Russia) Tatiana Repina	(United Kingdom) Emily Benham	
2015	(Czech Republic) Martina Tichovská	(Russia) Svetlana Poverina	(Sweden) Cecilia Thomasson	
2016	(United Kingdom) Emily Benham	(Finland) Marika Hara	(Finland) Henna Saarinen	
2017	(Finland) Marika Hara	(United Kingdom) Emily Benham	(Russia) Olga Vinogradova	
2018	(Finland) Henna Saarinen	(Czech Republic) Martina Tichovská (Denmark) Camilla Soegaard		
2019	(United Kingdom) Emily Benham Kvale	(Czech Republic) Veronika Kubínová	(United Kingdom) Clare Dallimore	
2021	(Finland) Marika Hara	Svetlana Foliforova*	(Sweden) Anna Tiderman	*Neutral athlete from Russia

== Mass Start ==
=== Men ===
Year	Gold	Silver	Bronze	Notes
2017	(Italy) Luca Dallavalle	(Russia) Ruslan Gritsan	(Switzerland) Simon Braendli	
2018	(Finland) Jussi Laurila	(Portugal) Davide Machado	(Austria) Kevin Haselsberger	
2019	(Czech Republic) Jiří Hradil	(Czech Republic) Kryštof Bogar	(Czech Republic) Vojtěch Stránský	
2021	(Finland) Samuel Pokala	(Czech Republic) Jiří Hradil	Anton Foliforov*	*Neutral athlete from Russia

=== Women ===
Year	Gold	Silver	Bronze	Notes
2017	(United Kingdom) Emily Benham	(Russia) Olga Vinogradova	(France) Gaëlle Barlet	
2018	(Denmark) Camilla Soegaard	(Czech Republic) Martina Tichovská	(Austria) Sonja Zinkl	
2019	(United Kingdom) Emily Benham Kvale	(Denmark) Camilla Soegaard	(Russia) Anastasiya Svir	
2021	Svetlana Foliforova*	(Finland) Mervi Pesu	(Czech Republic) Martina Tichovská	*Neutral athlete from Russia

== Relay ==
=== Men ===
Year	Gold	Silver	Bronze	Notes
2002	France	Czech Republic	Finland	
2004	Finland	Czech Republic	Australia	
2005	Finland	France	Switzerland	
2006	Finland	Russia	Switzerland	
2007	France	Czech Republic	Denmark	
2008	Denmark	Russia	Czech Republic	
2009	Russia	Czech Republic	Finland	
2010	Russia	Denmark	Czech Republic	
2011	Denmark	Czech Republic	Finland	
2012	Finland	Russia	Austria	
2013	Czech Republic	Finland	Estonia	
2014	Estonia	Finland	France	
2015	Austria	Russia	Finland	
2016	Czech Republic	Russia	France	
2017	Czech Republic	Finland	Russia	
2018	Russia	Sweden	Czech Republic	
2019	Russia	Czech Republic	Finland	
2021	Finland	Neutral*	Switzerland	*Neutral team from Russia

=== Women ===
Year	Gold	Silver	Bronze	Notes
2002	Finland	France	Czech Republic	
2004	Finland	Austria	Australia	
2005	Germany	Czech Republic	France	
2006	Russia	Finland	Czech Republic	
2007	Finland	Russia	Austria	
2008	Finland	Russia	Austria	
2009	Austria	Switzerland	Russia	
2010	Denmark	Finland	Czech Republic	
2011	Switzerland	(Lithuania) Lituania	Slovakia	
2012	Finland	Switzerland	Slovakia	
2013	Finland	Denmark	Switzerland	
2014	Russia	Finland	Czech Republic	
2015	Finland	Russia	Czech Republic	
2016	Finland	Russia	Czech Republic	
2017	Finland	France	Russia	
2018	Czech Republic	Russia	Finland	
2019	Russia	Finland	Sweden	
2021	Denmark	Finland	Neutral*	*Neutral team from Russia
