= Anke Dannowski =

German mountain bike orienteer

Medal record

Representing Germany

Women's mountain bike orienteering

World Championships
| Gold medal – first place | 2004 Ballarat | Long |
| Gold medal – first place | 2005 Banská Bystrica | Relay |
| Bronze medal – third place | 2005 Banská Bystrica | Long |

Anke Dannowski is a German mountain bike orienteering competitor and World Champion. She won an individual gold medal at the 2004 World MTB Orienteering Championships, and a gold medal in the relay in 2005.
