= Samuli Saarela =

Finnish mountain bike orienteer

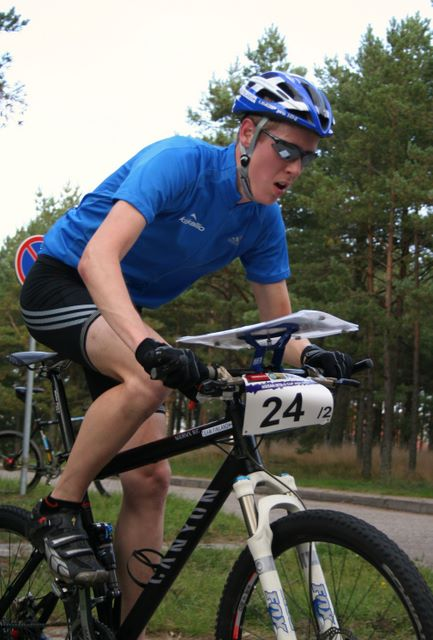

Personal information
- Born: 17 March 1988 (age 38)
Medal record
Representing Finland
Men's mountain bike orienteering
World Championships
Gold medal – first place	2010 Montalegre	Middle
Gold medal – first place	2011 Vicenza	Long
Gold medal – first place	2011 Vicenza	Middle
Bronze medal – third place	2009 Ben Shemen	Relay
Bronze medal – third place	2011 Vicenza	Relay

Samuli Saarela (born 17 March 1988) is a Finnish mountain bike orienteer. He won a gold medal in the middle distance at the 2010 World MTB Orienteering Championships in Montalegre.
