= Martina Tichovská =

Czech mountain bike orienteer

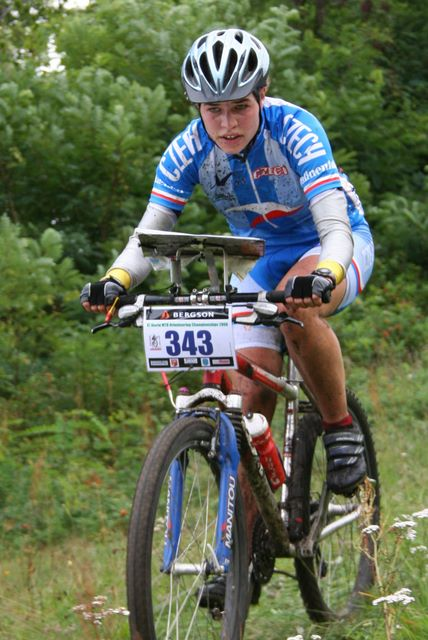

Medal record

Representing Czech Republic

Women's mountain bike orienteering

World Championships
Bronze medal – third place	2008 Ostróda, POL	Sprint
Bronze medal – third place	2010 Montalegre, POR	Sprint
Bronze medal – third place	2010 Montalegre, POR	Relay
Bronze medal – third place	2014 Białystok, POL	Relay
Gold medal – first place	2015 Liberec, CZE	Sprint
Gold medal – first place	2015 Liberec, CZE	Long
Silver medal – second place	2015 Liberec, CZE	Middle
Bronze medal – third place	2015 Liberec, CZE	Relay
Bronze medal – third place	2016 Aveiro-Coimbra, POR	Relay
Silver medal – second place	2017 Vilnius, LTU	Middle
Silver medal – second place	2017 Vilnius, LTU	Long

European Championships
Gold medal – first place	2011 Leningrad Oblast, RUS	Relay
Gold medal – first place	2015 Idanha-a-Nova, POR	Relay
Gold medal – first place	2015 Idanha-a-Nova, POR	Sprint
Gold medal – first place	2017 Orleáns, FRA	Sprint
Gold medal – first place	2017 Orleáns, FRA	Sprint relay
Gold medal – first place	2017 Orleáns, FRA	Relay
Silver medal – second place	2017 Orleáns, FRA	Middle
Silver medal – second place	2022 Ignalina, LTU	Sprint

World cup overall standings
Silver medal – second place	2015	2.
Bronze medal – third place	2016	3.
Silver medal – second place	2017	2.

Martina Tichovská is a Czech mountain bike orienteer. She won a bronze medal in the sprint event at the 2008 World MTB Orienteering Championships in Ostróda. At the 2010 World MTB Orienteering Championships in Montalegre she again won a bronze medal in sprint, and a bronze medal with the Czech relay team.
