= Michaela Gigon =

Austrian mountain bike orienteer

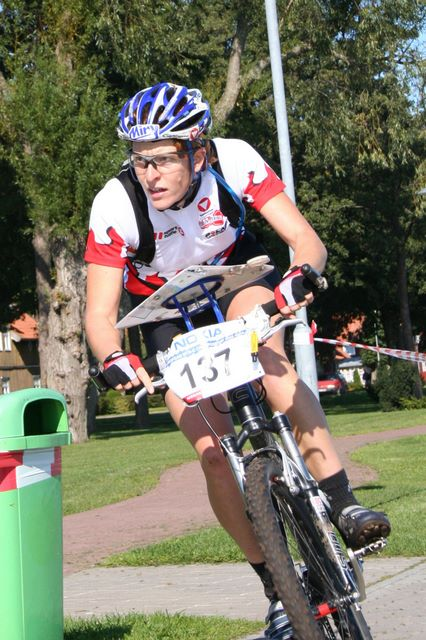
- Gigon in 2008

Medal record

Women's mountain bike orienteering

Representing Austria

World Championships
Gold medal – first place	2004 Ballarat	Middle
Gold medal – first place	2005 Banská Bystrica	Middle
Gold medal – first place	2006 Joensuu	Middle
Gold medal – first place	2007 Nové Město na Moravě	Long
Gold medal – first place	2009 Ben Shemen	Relay
Gold medal – first place	2010 Montalegre	Middle
Silver medal – second place	2004 Ballarat	Relay
Silver medal – second place	2007 Nové Město na Moravě	Sprint
Silver medal – second place	2008 Ostróda	Sprint
Silver medal – second place	2008 Ostróda	Middle
Silver medal – second place	2009 Ben Shemen	Middle
Bronze medal – third place	2007 Nové Město na Moravě	Relay
Bronze medal – third place	2008 Ostróda	Relay
Bronze medal – third place	2009 Ben Shemen	Sprint

Michaela Gigon (born 21 March 1977) is an Austrian mountain bike orienteer and several times world champion. She has competed at all World MTB Orienteering Championships from 2002 to 2010, won individual gold medals in 2004, 2005, 2006, 2007 and 2010, and in relay in 2009.

== Mountain bike orienteering career ==
Gigon competed at the very first World MTB Orienteering Championships in Fontainebleau in 2002, where she placed fifth in the sprint and eighth in the long distance. At the 2004 World Championships in Ballarat in 2004 she won the middle distance ahead of Laure Coupat and Belinda Allison, placed seventh in the long distance, and won a silver medal in the relay behind the Finnish team. At the 2005 World Championships in Banská Bystrica she won the middle distance and placed fourth in the long distance. At the 2006 World Mountain Bike Orienteering Championships in Joensuu she won the middle distance for the third time, placed seventh in the long distance, and fourth in the relay.

At the 2007 World Championships in Nové Město na Moravě she won a gold medal in the long distance, a silver medal in the sprint and placed ninth in the middle distance and won a bronze medal in the relay. At the 2008 World MTB Orienteering Championships in Ostróda, she won a silver medal in the sprint, a silver medal in the middle distance, and placed sixth in the long distance. She participated on the Austrian relay team which won a bronze medal.

At Ben Shemen in 2009 she won a bronze medal in the sprint, a silver in the middle distance, and placed fifth in the long distance. The Austrian relay team won gold medals for the first time, with Elisabeth Hohenwarter, Sonja Zinkl and Gigon on the team. At the 2010 World Championships in Montalegre she won a gold medal in the middle distance, placed sixth in the long distance, and eight in the relay.

== Orienteering career ==
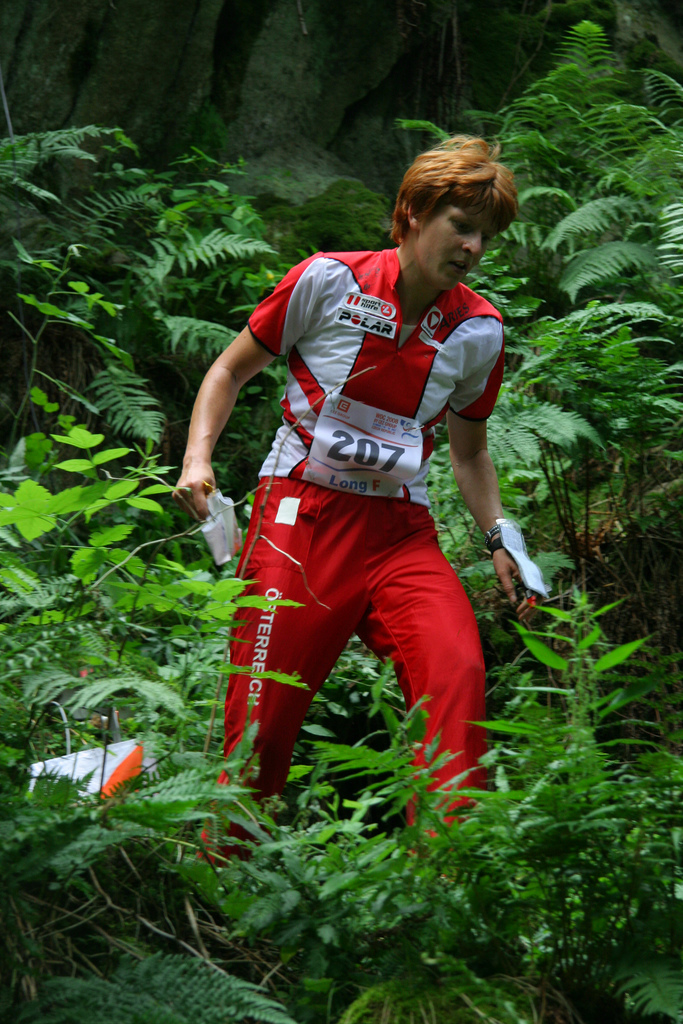
Gigon at WOC 2008

Gigon also competes in foot orienteering at an international level. At the 2008 World Orienteering Championships in Olomouc she placed 31st in the long distance and participated on the Austrian relay team which placed 22nd.
