= Samuel Pökälä =

Finnish cyclist (born 1990)

Personal information
- Born: 14 August 1990 (age 36) Asikkala, Finland

Cycling career
- Sport: Cycling
- Current team: Retired
- Discipline: Road
- Role: Rider
- Rider type: Time-trialist

Amateur teams
- 2012–2014: TWD–Länken
- 2015: VC Pays de Loudéac
- 2016–2017: TWD–Länken

Samuel Pökälä (born 14 August 1990) is a Finnish former professional cyclist. He rode at the 2013 UCI World Time Trial Championships, where he finished in 64th place, and he won the Finnish National Road Race Championships in 2015. In 2021, Pökälä was the winner of the world middle distance and mass start championships in mountain bike orienteering.

At the 2022 European MTB Orienteering Championships in Ignalina, Lithuania Pökälä won silver medal in long distance orienteering race.

== Major results ==
2013
1st Time trial, National Road Championships
2014
National Road Championships

1st Time trial
3rd Road race

2015
National Road Championships

1st Road race
1st Time trial

7th Scandinavian Race Uppsala
2016
1st Time trial, National Road Championships
2017
3rd Time trial, National Road Championships
