= Marika Hara =

Finnish mountain bike orienteering competitor

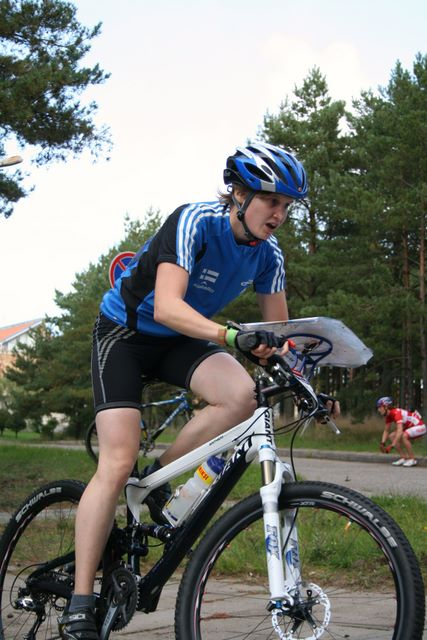

Medal record

Representing Finland

Women's mountain bike orienteering

World Championships
Gold medal – first place	2008 Ostróda	Relay
Gold medal – first place	2009 Ben Shemen	Middle
Silver medal – second place	2008 Ostróda	Long
Silver medal – second place	2009 Ben Shemen	Sprint
Silver medal – second place	2010 Montalegre	Relay
Bronze medal – third place	2010 Montalegre	Middle
Bronze medal – third place	2010 Montalegre	Long

European Championships
Bronze medal – third place	2022 Ignalina	Sprint

Marika Hara (born 2 September 1986) is a Finnish mountain bike orienteering competitor and world champion.

At the 2008 World MTB Orienteering Championships in Ostróda, she won a silver medal in the long distance, and a gold medal in the relay, together with Maija Lång and Ingrid Stengård. In Ben Shemen in 2009 she won a silver medal in the sprint, and a gold medal in the middle distance. At the 2010 World Championships she won two individual bronze medals and a silver medal in the relay.
