= Lasse Brun Pedersen =

Danish mountain bike orienteer

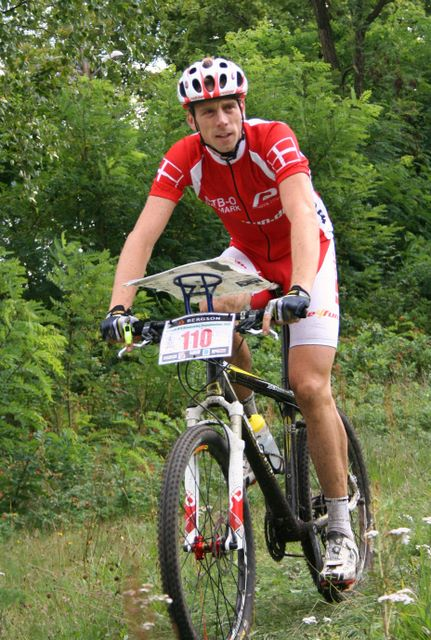

Medal record

Representing Denmark

Men's mountain bike orienteering

World Championships
Gold medal – first place	2008 Ostróda	Sprint
Gold medal – first place	2008 Ostróda	Relay
Gold medal – first place	2011 Vicenza	Relay
Silver medal – second place	2007 Nové Město na Moravě	Long
Silver medal – second place	2009 Ben Shemen	Sprint
Silver medal – second place	2010 Montalegre	Relay
Bronze medal – third place	2007 Nové Město na Moravě	Relay
Bronze medal – third place	2009 Ben Shemen	Middle

European Championships
Gold medal – first place	2008 Nida	Long
Gold medal – first place	2008 Nida	Middle
Gold medal – first place	2009 Hillerød	Long
Silver medal – second place	2009 Hillerød	Middle

Lasse Brun Pedersen (born 1974) is a Danish mountain bike orienteering competitor and World Champion. He won an individual gold medal at the 2008 World MTB Orienteering Championships, and a gold medal in the relay.
