= Anton Foliforov =

Russian mountain bike orienteer

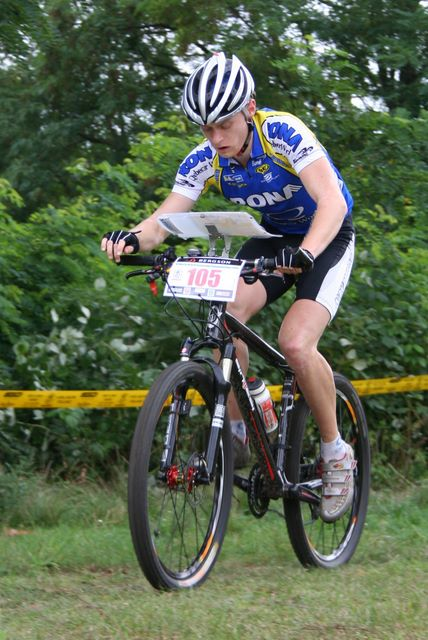

Medal record

Representing Russia

Men's mountain bike orienteering

World Championships
Gold medal – first place	2009 Ben Shemen	Relay
Gold medal – first place	2010 Montalegre	Long
Gold medal – first place	2010 Montalegre	Relay
Gold medal – first place	2011 Vicenza	Sprint
Bronze medal – third place	2007 Nové Město na Moravě	Sprint
Bronze medal – third place	2010 Montalegre	Sprint

Anton Foliforov (born 3 January 1981) is a Russian mountain bike orienteer. He won an individual gold medal at the 2010 World MTB Orienteering Championships, and won gold medals with the Russian relay team in 2009 and 2010.
