= Ingrid Stengård =

Finnish mountain bike orienteering competitor

Medal record

Representing Finland

Women's mountain bike orienteering

World Championships
Gold medal – first place	2007 Nové Město na Moravě	Relay
Gold medal – first place	2008 Ostróda	Relay
Silver medal – second place	2006 Joensuu	Relay
Silver medal – second place	2010 Montalegre	Relay
Bronze medal – third place	2006 Joensuu	Middle
Bronze medal – third place	2006 Joensuu	Long

Ingrid Stengård (born 31 July 1975) is a Finnish mountain bike orienteering competitor. She won two individual bronze medals at the 2006 World MTB Orienteering Championships, and won gold medals with the Finnish relay team in 2007 and 2008.
