= Mountain bike orienteering =

Type of sport

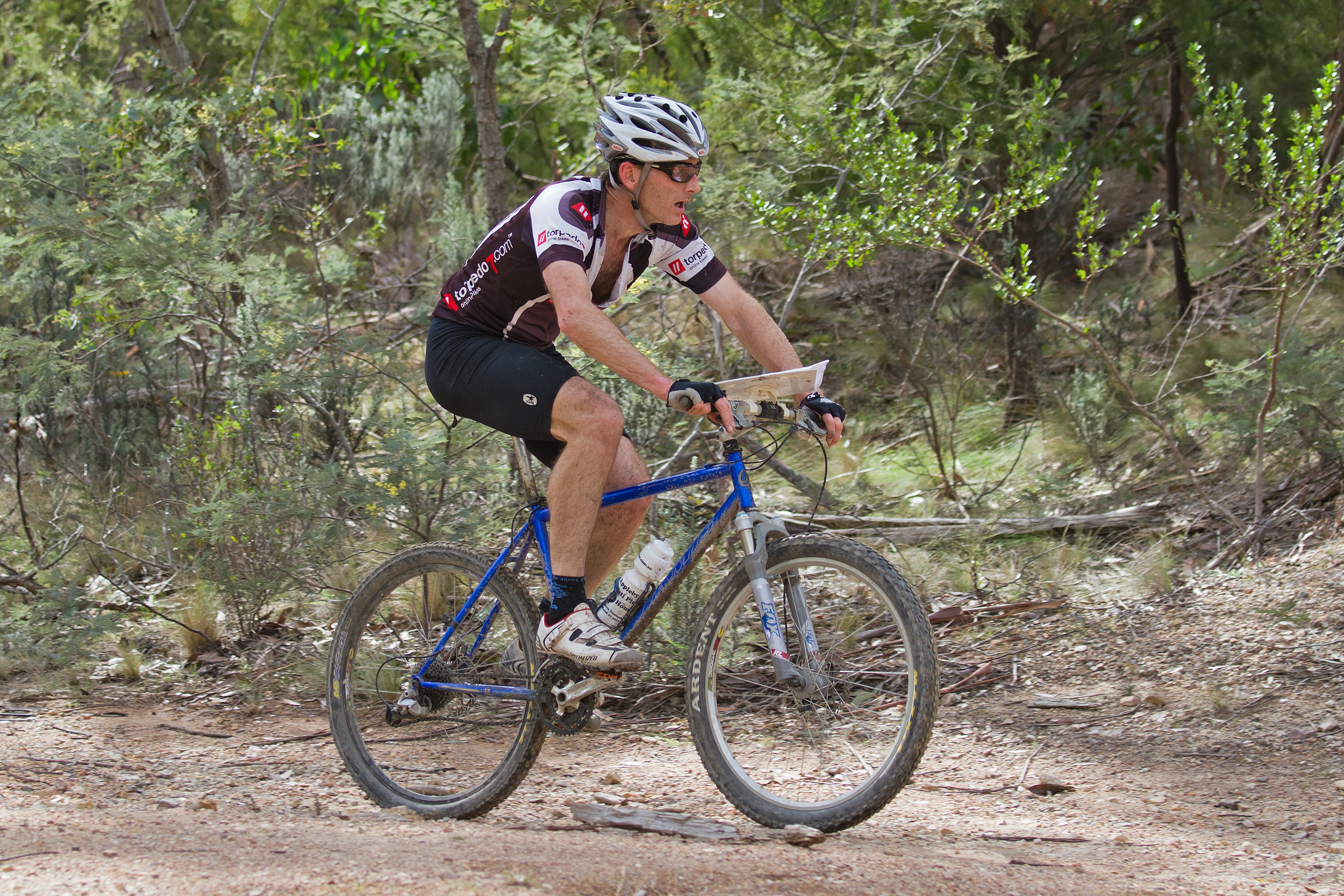
- Mountain Bike orienteer with hard tail mountain bike, clipless pedals, and map holder.
- Highest governing body: International Orienteering Federation

Characteristics
- Contact: Non-contact
- Team members: Individual
- Mixed-sex: Separate categories
- Type: Outdoor

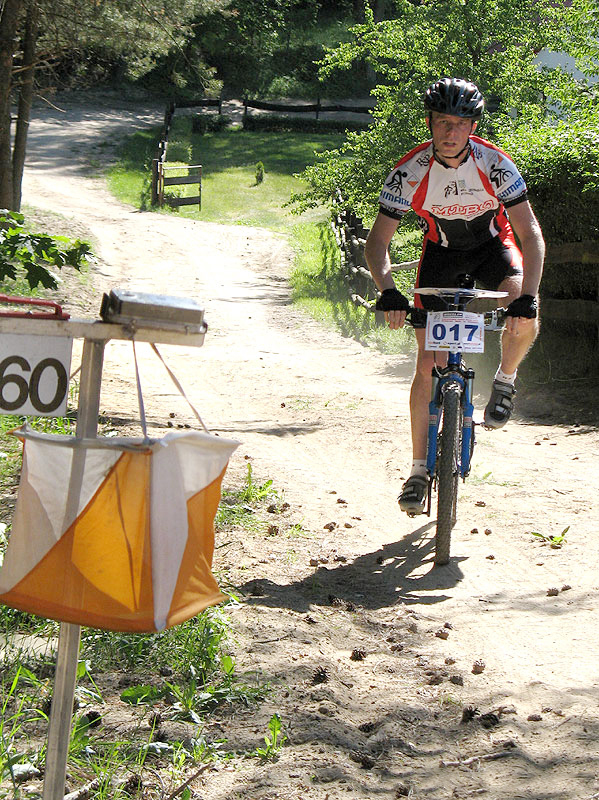
Mountain bike orienteering

Mountain bike orienteering (MTB-O or MTBO) is an orienteering endurance racing sport on a mountain bike where navigation is done along trails and tracks. Compared with foot orienteering, competitors usually are not permitted to leave the trail and track network. Navigation tactics are similar to ski-orienteering, where the major focus is route choice while navigating. The main difference compared to ski-orienteering is that navigation is done at a higher pace, because the bike can reach higher speeds. As the biker reaches higher speeds, map reading becomes more challenging.

== Equipment ==
Preferred bike type is a robust mountain bike meant for cross-country cycling, but any type of bike can be used. Depending on terrain type either hard tailed or full suspension mountain bikes are more appropriate. Clipless pedals with a special cycling shoe are mostly used by serious cyclists to enable maximum power output, and to keep feet secure on the pedals. Bicycle helmets are usually a requirement in competitions.

=== Special equipment ===
A map holder attached to the handlebar of the bike is an essential piece of equipment in mountain bike orienteering, and most holders allow the map to be rotated. Known brands for map holders are Orifix, Mapdec, Miry, Devotech, Nordenmark, Autopilot and Windchill. Compasses may be used but electronic navigational aids (such as GPS-based watches) are not permitted. Competitors may carry repair tools and spare parts during races.

== Map ==
Maps are usually smaller scale (1:5 000 – 1:30 000) and less detailed than standard orienteering maps. Trails and tracks are marked on mountain bike orienteering maps based on their riding difficulty, with four classifications: easy, slow, difficult and impossible to ride. Also, obstacles that require a dismount are usually marked on the map.

== Organization and events ==
MTB-O is one of four orienteering sports governed by the International Orienteering Federation. The first World Championship event was held in 2002 in Fontainebleau, France. Since 2004 the World Championships have been held annually. European Championships have been held annually since 2006. Mountain bike orienteering is most popular in European countries and Australia.

- M17 and W17 (Youth) is for competitors who reach the age of 17, or younger, in the year which the event is held.
- M20 and W20 (Junior) is for competitors who reach the age of 20, or younger, in the year which the event is held.
- M21 and W21 (Elite) is meant for competitors who reach the age of 21, or older, in the year which the event is held. Any competitor, regardless of their age, can however compete in the elite classes.

There are annual World Championships in the elite and junior classes. There are also world championships for masters, which is for competitors aged 35 and up.

There are annual European Championships in elite, junior and youth classes.

== Mountain bike orienteerers ==
The most successful mountain bike orienteerer is Anton Foliforov from Russia, who has taken 31 World Championship and 11 European Championship medals. Other successful mountain bike orienteers are Michaela Gigon, Ruslan Gritsan, Adrian Jackson, Christine Schaffner and Päivi Tommola. For a full list of all medals taken by mountain bike orienteerers at World- and European Championships, visit MTBO Info

== Time-Keeping ==
In order to keep track of the competitors' riding times, Sportident is typically used. Each rider has a 'card' (chip) on their finger, and they 'punch' the Control point (orienteering) as shown on the image below. The card registers when the punch was made, which can be used for keeping track of riding times and split-times for each control point a rider has punched. In recent years, time-keeping has become more modern, and mountain bike orienteering events typically use touch-free time-keeping, meaning that competitors can maintain their speed while punching the control points. The competitors can ride past the control points at up to 180 cm range and still punch the controls.

Another time-keeping system is Emit, which works in a similar fashion to Sportident.

== Disciplines ==
In mountain bike orienteering there are 5 main disciplines which can be competed in at the world championships. Generally, all disciplines have around 25 control points along the way.

=== Sprint ===
The sprint is the shortest discipline, with estimated winning-times of 20–25 minutes for M21 and W21 (elite classes), and 16–20 minutes for M20 and W20 (junior classes). Sprints often take place in cities, towns or industrial districts. Competitors race individually, typically starting with 1–2 minute gaps between the competitors. Fastest time to punch all the controls in the right order and cross the finish line wins.

=== Middle Distance ===
The middle distance is somewhere between the sprint and long distance. Winning times are 50–55 minutes for M21 and W21, and 40–45 minutes for M20 and W20. Middle distances often take place in forests. Competitors race individually, typically starting with 2 minute gaps between the competitors. Fastest time to punch all the controls in the right order and cross the finish line wins.

=== Long Distance ===
The long distance is the longest discipline. Winning times are 105–115 minutes for M21 and W21, and 84–92 minutes for M20 and W20. Long distances often take place in forests. Competitors race individually, typically starting with 3 minute gaps between the competitors. Fastest time to punch all the controls in the right order and cross the finish line wins.

=== Mass Start ===
The mass start is known as the most chaotic discipline. Winning times are 75–85 minutes for M21 and W21, and 60–68 minutes for M20 and W20. Mass starts often take place in forests. Competitors all start at the same time, hence the name mass start. In order to keep competitors from just following each other and ensuring they have to orienteer themselves, there are 'forkings' on mass starts. This means that not all competitors have to ride to the control points in the same order. It could for example be 2 loops called A and B where half the competitors do A first and then B, and the other half does B first and then A. All competitors will end up riding exactly the same course in the end, but will have to split up during the race. First competitor to punch all controls in the right order and cross the finish line wins.

=== Relay ===
The relay is a team-discipline. There are 3 competitors on each team, taking turn to ride their course. Winning times are 120–135 minutes (total) for M21 and W21, and 90–105 minutes for M20 and W20. Relays often take place in forests. The first competitors on all teams start at the same time, similar to the mass start. When they cross the finish line and touch their team's next competitor, the next competitor continues the race. Similarly to the mass start, there are forkings on the relay, so competitors can't just follow other riders. All teams will end up riding exactly the same courses in the end, but in different orders. First team to all finish their courses and cross the finish line wins.

== Rules ==
There is a set of rules which must be followed when competing at events. If not followed, it can lead to disqualification. The most prominent rules are:

- Competitors may not leave their bike; it has to be ridden, carried or pushed at all times.
- Competitors may only ride on paths and roads that are on the map, unless otherwise described. In some countries or areas riders are allowed to ride off-track, which will be specified in the event bulletin.
- Competitors may not use GPS devices while competing in a race.

For a full list of the rules, see MTBO Competition Rules

== Most recent World Championships ==
The most recent World Championships were in Finland, Kuortane from 9 to 18 June 2021. The winners and World Champions of each discipline were as follows:

- Mass Start

M21: Samuel Pökälä (Finland)
W21: Svetlana Foliforova (Russia)
M20: Morten Örnhagen Jørgensen (Denmark)
W20: Kaarina Nurminen (Finland)

- Sprint Distance

M21: Krystof Bogar (Czech Republic)
W21: Marika Hara (Finland)
M20: Mikkel Brunstedt Nørgaard (Denmark)
W20: Kaarina Nurminen (Finland)

- Middle Distance

M21: Samuel Pökälä (Finland)
W21: Svetlana Foliforova (Russia)
M20: Morten Örnhagen Jørgensen (Denmark)
W20: Kaarina Nurminen (Finland)

- Long Distance

M21: Andre Haga (Finland)
W21: Camilla Søgaard (Denmark)
M20: Morten Örnhagen Jørgensen (Denmark)
W20: Lucie Nedomlelova (Czech Republic)

- Relay

M21: Andre Haga, Pekka Niemi, Samuel Pökälä (Finland)
W21: Cæcilie Christoffersen, Nikoline Splittorff, Camilla Søgaard (Denmark)
M20: Noah Tristan Hoffmann, Mikkel Brunstedt Nørgaard, Morten Örnhagen Jørgensen (Denmark)
W20: Ekaterina Landgraf, Daria Toporova, Alena Aksenova (Russia)

== See also ==
- Alleycat races
- Adventure racing
