= Junior World Ski Orienteering Championships =

International ski orienteering junior competitions

- Status: active
- Genre: sporting event
- Date: January–March
- Frequency: annual
- Inaugurated: 1994
- Organiser: IOF

The Junior World Ski Orienteering Championships (or Ski-JWOC) were first held in 1994. Since 1998, competitions have been held annually. Representative countries must be members of the International Orienteering Federation (IOF).

== Host Towns/Cities ==
|1 || 1994 || || Rovaniemi, Finland

|2 || 1996 || February 5–12 || Banská Bystrica/Donovaly, Slovakia

|3 || 1998 || || Velegozh, Russia

|4 || 1999 || March 1–7 || Jundola, Bulgaria

|5 || 2000 ||January 31 – February 6|| Banská Bystrica, Slovakia

|6 || 2001 || February 11–18 || Trentino, Italy

|7 || 2002 ||January 27 – February 3|| Jablonec nad Nisou/Harrachov, Czech Republic

|8 || 2003 || February 17–23|| St. Petersburg, Russia

|9 || 2004 || January 19–25 || Vuokatti, Finland

|10 || 2005 || January 23–29 || S-chanf, Switzerland

|11 || 2006 || February 20–27 || Ivanovo, Russia

|12 || 2007 || February 11–18 || Salzburg, Austria

|13 || 2008 || February 11–18 || Dospat, Bulgaria

|14 || 2009 || January 25 – February 1 || Dalarna, Sweden

|15 || 2010 || February 8–15 || Miercurea Ciuc, Romania

|16 || 2011 || January 31–6 February || Lillehammer, Norway

|17 || 2012 || February 20–26 || Sumy, Ukraine

|18 || 2013 || February 11–18 || Madona, Latvia

|19 || 2014 || February 18–23 || Põlva, Estonia

|20 || 2015 || February 9–15 || Hamar/Løten, Norway

|21 || 2016 || 29 February – 5 March || Obertilliach, Tyrol, Austria

|22 || 2017 || 8–12 February || Imatra, Finland

|23 || 2018 || 4–8 February || Bulgaria

|24 || 2019 || 20–24 march || Piteå, Sweden

|25 || 2020 || 20–26 February || Vännäs, Sweden

|26 || 2021 || 24–28 February || Kärriku, Estonia

|27 || 2022 || 15–19 march || Kemi, Finland

|28 || 2023 || 1–5 February || Madona, Latvia

|29 || 2024 || 22–27 February || Ramsau am Dachstein, Austria

|30 || 2025 || 19-23 march || Posio, Finland

== Long ==
=== Men ===
Year	Gold	Silver	Bronze	Notes
1994	(Sweden) Peter Fredriksson	(Finland) Tapani Partanen	(Sweden) Per Engström	
1996	(Finland) Matti Keskinarkaus	(Norway) Stian Hognestad	(Russia) Ilshat Gimranov	
1998	(Russia) Ruslan Gritsan	(Russia) Sergei Osipov	(Russia) Vitali Homchenko	
1999	(Finland) Topi Suomalainen	(Russia) Vasili Glouharev	(Sweden) Peter Arnesson	
2000	(Finland) Petri Kiiskinen	(Switzerland) Marc Lauenstein	(Finland) Jari Sillman	
2001	(Russia) Kirill Vesselov	(Switzerland) Remo Fischer	(Russia) Mikhail Sorokin	
2002	(Russia) Kirill Vesselov	(Russia) Anton Smirnov	(Finland) Staffan Tunis	
2003	(Finland) Jonne Lehto	(Russia) Nikolai Moskalenko	(Russia) Alexey Bortnik	
2004	(Finland) Jonne Lehto	(Sweden) Erik Rost	(Finland) Jussi Simula	
2005	(Sweden) Erik Rost	(Russia) Alexey Kozhemiakin	(Russia) Andrey Lamov	
2006	(Russia) Andrey Lamov	(Russia) Taras Kashchuk	(Norway) Magne Dæhli	17.9 km, 22 controls
2007	(Russia) Taras Kashchuk	(Finland) Olli-Markus Taivainen	(Sweden) Daniel Nordebo	12.0 km, 25 controls
2008	(Bulgaria) Stanimir Belomazhev	(Finland) Olli-Markus Taivainen	(Russia) Taras Kashchuk	
2009	(Finland) Olli-Markus Taivainen	(Norway) Hans Jörgen Kvåle	(Finland) Leo Laakkonen	16.2 km, 18 controls
2010	(Russia) Mikhail Utkin	(Sweden) Anton Sjökvist	(Sweden) David Bejmer	
2011	(Sweden) Daniel Svensson	(Sweden) Anton Sjökvist	(Russia) Gleb Tikhonov	
2012	(Sweden) Andreas Holmberg	(Russia) Aleksey Popov	(Finland) Santeri Aikio	
2013	(Finland) Lauri Nenonen	(Sweden) Ulrik Nordberg	(Finland) Tuomas Kotro	
2014	(Finland) Misa Tuomala	(Russia) Sergey Gorlanov	(Latvia) Nauris Raize	
2015 (Note: Only U20 results)	(Finland) Aleksi Karppinen	(Russia) Vladislav Kiselev	(Russia) Sergey Gorlanov	14.0 km, 41 participants
2016	(Russia) Vladislav Kiselev	(Finland) Anssi Koirikivi	(Russia) Sergey Gorlanov	14.7 km, 46 participants
2017	(Russia) Vladislav Kiselev	(Russia) Aleksandr Pavlenko	(Russia) Vadim Ogorodnikov	16.3 km, 46 participants
2018	(Norway) Jørgen Baklid	(Sweden) Henning Sjökvist	(Russia) Igor Linkevich	? km, 50 participants
2019	(Russia) Sergey Mizonov	(Switzerland) Nicola Mueller	(Russia) German Sazykin	17.1 km, 38 participants
2020	(Russia) German Sazykin	(Russia) Artemiy Dorma	(Norway) Isak Jonsson	17.4 km, 34 participants

=== Women ===
Year	Gold	Silver	Bronze	Notes
1994	(Finland) Liisa Anttila	(Finland) Ella Heiko	(Sweden) Lina Börjes	
1996	(Finland) Hanna Kosonen	(Norway) Anne M. Hausken	(Russia) Tatiana Naumova	
1998	(Finland) Erja Jokinen	(Finland) Katja Rajaniemi	(Finland) Hannele Valkonen	
1999	(Finland) Katja Rajaniemi	(Sweden) Marie Lund	(Russia) Anna Ustinova	
2000	(Russia) Yekaterina Chizhikova	(Finland) Kirsi Vanhalakka	(Finland) Aino-Maria Hirvi	
2001	(Russia) Yekaterina Chizhikova	(Sweden) Lena Eliasson	(Finland) Kirsi Vanhalakka	
2002	(Russia) Yekaterina Chizhikova	(Finland) Katri Mehtälä	(Czech Republic) Eva Böhmová	
2003	(Russia) Yelena Grand	(Finland) Laura Salmi	(Finland) Sari Suomalainen	
2004	(Russia) Valentina Lebedeva	(Russia) Olga Novikova	(Czech Republic) Lenka Hrusková	
2005	(Sweden) Eva Svensson	(Russia) Olga Novikova	(Russia) Anastasia Kravchenko	
2006	(Russia) Anastasia Kravchenko	(Russia) Tatiana Kozlova	(Sweden) Eva Svensson	10.7 km, 18 controls
2007	(Sweden) Eva Svensson	(Sweden) Helene Söderlund	(Czech Republic) Hana Hanciková	9.9 km, 20 controls
2008	(Russia) Alyona Chukareva	(Switzerland) Judith Wyder	(Russia) Yekaterina Munina	
2009	(Russia) Tatiana Medvedeva	(Sweden) Tove Alexandersson	(Sweden) Maria Nordström	9.3 km, 8 controls
2010	(Norway) Barbro Kvåle	(Sweden) Maria Nordström	(Norway) Marie Asprusten	
2011	(Norway) Barbro Kvåle	(Sweden) Tove Alexandersson	(Finland) Marjut Turunen	
2012	(Sweden) Tove Alexandersson	(Sweden) Linda Lindkvist	(Finland) Marjut Turunen	
2013	(Sweden) Frida Sandberg	(Finland) Oona Valkonen	(Sweden) Linda Lindkvist	
2014	(Sweden) Evelina Wickbom	(Sweden) Frida Sandberg	(Russia) Liubov Balandina	
2015	(Sweden) Isabel Salen	(Russia) Liubov Balandina	(Norway) Anine Ahlsand	10.7 km, 35 participants
2016	(Norway) Anine Ahlsand	(Czech Republic) Petra Hancová	(Finland) Tuuli Suutari	10.97 km, 35 participants

== Short/Middle ==
This event was called "Short distance" from 1994 to 2004. Since 2005 it is called "Middle distance".

=== Men ===
Year	Gold	Silver	Bronze	Notes
1994	(Finland) Tapani Partanen	(Sweden) Peter Fredriksson	(Finland) Vesa Varis	
1996	(Finland) Mika Hakkarainen	(Finland) Matti Keskinarkaus	(Czech Republic) Jakub Vodrazka	
1998	(Russia) Ruslan Gritsan	(Finland) Markus Kainu	(Russia) Vitali Homchenko	
1999	(Norway) Olav Baken-Hagelia	(Finland) Pasi Kiiskinen	(Sweden) Erik Wiberg	
2000	(Russia) Vasili Gloukharev	(Sweden) David Andersson	(Sweden) Peter Arnesson	
2001	(Sweden) David Andersson	(Switzerland) Remo Fischer	(Russia) Kirill Vesselov	
2002	(Finland) Tuukka Turkka	(Finland) Staffan Tunis	(Russia) Vadim Tolstopyatov	
2003	(Finland) Tuukka Turkka	(Russia) Alexey Kozhemiakin	(Sweden) Pär Häggström	
2004	(Finland) Jonne Lehto	(Russia) Andrey Lamov	(Sweden) Erik Rost	
2005	(Sweden) Erik Rost	(Finland) Jussi Simula	(Russia) Pavel Utkin	
2006	(Russia) Andrey Lamov	(Finland) Olli-Markus Taivainen	(Norway) Magne Dæhli	7.45 km, 15 controls
2007	(Russia) Taras Kashchuk	(Norway) Ove Sätra	(Sweden) Thomas Carlsson	6.3 km, 20 controls
2008	(Bulgaria) Stanimir Belomazhev	(Finland) Leo Laakkonen	(Russia) Valeriy Glukhov	8.2 km, 18 controls
2009	(Finland) Olli-Markus Taivainen	(Finland) Leo Laakkonen	(Sweden) Gustav Nordström	7.5 km, 16 controls
2010	(Russia) Mikhail Utkin	(Norway) Rasmus Korvald Skaare	(Norway) Vetle Ruud Bråten	
2011	(Sweden) Anton Sjökvist	(Sweden) Adam Karlsson	(Sweden) Daniel Svensson	
2012	(Sweden) Andreas Holmberg	(Russia) Aleksey Popov	(Sweden) Ulrik Nordberg	
2013	(Finland) Misa Tuomala	(Norway) Jonas Bakken	(Finland) Tuomas Kotro	
2014	(Norway) Jonas Madslien Bakken	(Finland) Aleksi Karppinen	(Russia) Sergey Gorlanov	
2015	(Russia) Aleksandr Pavlenko	(Finland) Aleksi Karppinen	(Norway) Audun Heimdal	7.5 km, 41 participants
2016	(Russia) Sergey Gorlanov	(Russia) Vladislav Kiselev	(Russia) Aleksandr Pavlenko	6.9 km, 45 participants

=== Women ===
Year	Gold	Silver	Bronze	Notes
1994	(Finland) Liisa Anttila	(Russia) Irina Onistchenko	(Sweden) Annica Clevnert	
1996	(Finland) Hanna Kosonen	(Russia) Olga Porozova	(Sweden) Annika Björk	
1998	(Russia) Anna Ustinova	(Sweden) Maria Bergkvist	(Russia) Anna Vorobieva	
1999	(Russia) Anna Ustinova	(Finland) Katja Rajaniemi	(Finland) Salla Lehto	
2000	(Finland) Aino-Maria Hirvi	(Russia) Ekaterina Chizhikova	(Finland) Salla Lehto	
2001	(Sweden) Maria Bergkvist	(Russia) Svetlana Shvezova	(Finland) Martiina Joensuu	
2002	(Russia) Ekaterina Chizhikova	(Russia) Maria Gorchkova	(Russia) Elena Grand	
2003	(Russia) Elena Grand	(Sweden) Emelie Eklöf	(Finland) Marttiina Joensuu	
2004	(Russia) Olga Novikova	(Russia) Valentina Lebedeva	(Russia) Yulia Bronnikova	
2005	(Sweden) Eva Svensson	(Russia) Olga Novikova	(Finland) Pernilla Tunis	
2006	(Russia) Tatiana Kozlova	(Russia) Anastasia Kravchenko	(Russia) Maria Shilova	5.27 km, 13 controls
2007	(Sweden) Eva Svensson	(Russia) Olga Trifanova	(Sweden) Helene Söderlund	4.9 km, 15 controls
2008	(Czech Republic) Simona Karochova	(Russia) Ekaterina Munina	(Sweden) Christina Lovald-Hellberg	6.4 km, 14 controls
2009	(Sweden) Maria Nordström	(Sweden) Tove Alexandersson	(Norway) Marie Asprusten	6.3 km, 14 controls
2010	(Norway) Barbro Kvåle	(Norway) Marie Asprusten	(Russia) Ekaterina Situkhina	
2011	(Sweden) Tove Alexandersson	(Norway) Barbro Kvåle	(Finland) Marjut Turunen	
2012	(Sweden) Tove Alexandersson	(Finland) Anna Närhi	(Finland) Marjut Turunen	
2013	(Sweden) Frida Sandberg	(Estonia) Daisy Kudre	(Sweden) Evelina Wickbom	
2014	(Sweden) Frida Sandberg	(Sweden) Isabel Salen	(Finland) Suvi Oikarinen	
2015	(Sweden) Isabel Salen	(Sweden) Ellen Sarenmark	(Sweden) Hanna Eriksson	4.8 km, 36 participants
2016	(Finland) Tuuli Suutari	(Russia) Liubov Balandina	(Sweden) Klara Yngvesson	6.0 km, 35 participants

== Sprint ==
This event was first held in 2005.

=== Men ===
Year	Gold	Silver	Bronze	Notes
2005	(Sweden) Erik Rost	(Russia) Stanislav Cheha	(Sweden) Gustav Hall	
2006	(Russia) Andrey Lamov	(Russia) Taras Kashchuk	(Finland) Olli-Markus Taivainen	2.81 km, 9 controls
2007	(Finland) Olli-Markus Taivainen	(Russia) Taras Kashchuk	(Sweden) Johan Edin	3.0 km, 12 controls
2008	(Norway) Sindre Haverstad	(Russia) Alexander Vereshchagin	(Norway) Hans Jörgen Kvåle	3.6 km, 7 controls
2009	(Finland) Olli-Markus Taivainen	(Sweden) Gustav Nordström	(Norway) Hans Jörgen Kvåle	3.0 km, 9 controls
2010	(Russia) Stepan Malinovskiy	(Russia) Mikhail Utkin	(Belarus) Yury Yazykou	
2011	(Russia) Gleb Tikhonov	(Finland) Tuomas Kotro	(Sweden) Daniel Svensson	
2012	(Sweden) Andreas Holmberg	(Finland) Misa Tuomala	(Sweden) Linus Rapp	
2013	(Sweden) Ulrik Nordberg	(Norway) Lofthus Dag	(Finland) Lauri Nenonen	
2014	(Russia) Sergey Shalin	(Finland) Jyri Uusitalo	(Sweden) Sixten Walheim	
2015	(Russia) Vladislav Kiselev	(Russia) Aleksandr Pavlenko	(Norway) Elias Thorsdal Molnvik	41 participants
2016	(Russia) Vladislav Kiselev	(Russia) Sergey Gorlanov	(Norway) Audun Heimdal	2.96 km, 45 participants

=== Women ===
Year	Gold	Silver	Bronze	Notes
2005	(Russia) Tatiana Kozlova	(Russia) Anastasia Kravchenko	(Russia) Alena Trapeznikova	
2006	(Russia) Tatiana Kozlova	(Russia) Maria Shilova	(Russia) Anastasia Kravchenko	2.45 km, 9 controls
2007	(Czech Republic) Hana Hancikova	(Sweden) Helene Söderlund	(Sweden) Eva Svensson	2.7 km, 9 controls
2008	(Czech Republic) Hana Hancikova	(Sweden) Christina Lovald-Hellberg	(Sweden) Kristina Nordebo	3.1 km, 6 controls
2009	(Sweden) Maria Nordström	(Russia) Tatiana Medvedeva	(Russia) Tamara Ezhkova	2.5 km, 8 controls
2010	(Sweden) Maria Nordström	(Norway) Marie Asprusten	(Russia) Anastasiya Svir	
2011	(Sweden) Tove Alexandersson	(Norway) Barbro Kvåle	(Finland) Marjut Turunen	
2012	(Sweden) Tove Alexandersson	(Norway) Anna Ulvensøen	(Finland) Salla Koskela	
2013	(Sweden) Frida Sandberg	(Sweden) Linda Lindkvist	(Norway) Andrine Benjaminsen	
2014	(Russia) Liubov Balandina	(Sweden) Frida Sandberg	(Sweden) Isabel Salen	
2015	(Norway) Anine Ahlsand	(Norway) Evine Westli Andersen	(Norway) Andrine Benjaminsen	36 participants
2016	(Norway) Anine Ahlsand	(Finland) Liisa Nenonen	(Russia) Liubov Balandina	2.66 km, 34 participants

== Relay ==
=== Men ===
Year	Gold	Silver	Bronze	Notes
1994	Sweden	Finland	Russia	
1996	Finland	Norway	Czech Republic	
1998	Sweden	Norway	Estonia	
1999	Finland	Sweden	Switzerland	
2000	Switzerland	Sweden	Russia	
2001	Norway	Sweden	Russia	
2002	Finland	Russia	Czech Republic	
2003	Russia	Finland	Sweden	
2004	Finland	Sweden	Russia	
2005	Russia	Sweden	Finland	
2006	Russia	Norway	Finland	
2007	Sweden	Norway	Finland	
2008	Finland	Norway	Sweden	
2009	Finland	Norway	Russia	
2010	Sweden	Norway	Finland	
2011	Sweden	Finland	Norway	
2012	Sweden	Finland	Russia	
2013	Finland	Russia	Norway	
2014	Finland	Russia	Norway	
2015	Russia; Aleksandr Pavlenko; Sergey Gorlanov; Vladislav Kiselev	Finland; Samuli Schroderus; Eevert Toivonen; Aleksi Karppinen	Norway; Jonas Madslien Bakken; Elias Thordal Molnvik; Bjornar Kvale	10 countries
2016	Russia; Aleksandr Pavlenko; Sergey Gorlanov; Vladislav Kiselev	Norway; Vegard Gulbrandsen; Jorgen Baklid; Audun Heimdal	Sweden; Robin Salen; Filip Jacobsson; Henning Sjokvist	10 countries

=== Women ===
Year	Gold	Silver	Bronze	Notes
1994	Finland	Norway	Sweden	
1996	Norway	Czech Republic	Finland	
1998	Finland	Sweden	Norway	
1999	Finland	Russia	Sweden	
2000	Finland	Russia	Sweden	
2001	Finland	Russia	Sweden	
2002	Russia	Finland	Czech Republic	
2003	Russia	Finland	Sweden	
2004	Russia	Finland	Sweden	
2005	Russia	Sweden	Norway	
2006	Russia	Sweden	Czech Republic	
2007	Sweden	Czech Republic	Finland	
2008	Russia	Finland	Norway	
2009	Sweden	Finland	Czech Republic	
2010	Sweden	Russia	Norway	
2011	Norway	Finland	Sweden	
2012	Sweden	Norway	Finland	
2013	Norway	Sweden	Russia	
2014	Sweden	Russia	Finland	
2015	Russia; Mariya Petrushko; Anastasia Sopova; Liubov Balandina	Finland; Tuuli Suutari; Juliaana Nasi; Suvi Oikarinen	Sweden; Hanna Eriksson; Ellen Sarenmark; Isabel Salen	7 countries
2016	Finland; Maiju Kovanen; Liisa Nenonen; Tuuli Suutari	Norway; Tilla Farnes Hennum; Ragnhild Hjermstad; Anine Ahlsand	Sweden; Klara Yngvesson; Ida Nordlund; Isabel Salen	12 countries

== See also ==
- World Ski Orienteering Championships
- World Cup in Ski Orienteering

== External links and references ==
- Ski-JWOC (IOF) (Retrieved October 27, 2020)
- Ski-JWOC2006 – Official site (Retrieved June 29, 2008)
- Ski-JWOC2007 – Official site (Retrieved June 29, 2008)
- Ski-JWOC2008 – Official site (Retrieved June 29, 2008)
- "Ski-JWOC 2009. Results". Official site. Archived from the original on January 31, 2009.
- Ski-JWOC2010 – Official site
