= Ann Charlotte Karlsson =

Swedish ski-orienteering competitor

Medal record

Representing Sweden

Women's Ski-orienteering

World Championships
Gold medal – first place	1992 Chapelle de Bois	Relay

World Cup
Bronze medal – third place	1989	Overall WC

Ann Charlotte Karlsson is a Swedish ski-orienteering competitor.

She placed third overall in the World Cup in Ski Orienteering in 1989, behind Virpi Juutilainen and Ragnhild Bratberg, and ahead of Mirja Linnainmaa and Carina Östlund. She won a gold medal in the relay at the 1992 World Ski Orienteering Championships in France, together with Annika Zell and Arja Hannus.
