= 2021 Winter Universiade =

Cancelled winter sports event

Lucerne 2021 XXX Winter Universiade: XXX Winter-Universiade (German); XXX Universiade d'hiver (French); XXX Universiade invernale (Italian); XXX Universiade d'enviern (Romansh)
- Host city: Lucerne, Switzerland
- Motto: Welcome Home!, Bienvenue à la maison
- Edition: 30th
- Events: 60 events in 10 sports (proposed)
- Opening: 11 December 2021 (cancelled)
- Closing: 21 December 2021 (cancelled)
- Dates: Cancelled
- Main venue: Swissporarena
- Website: winteruniversiade2021.ch (archived)

The 2021 Winter Universiade, officially known as the XXX Winter Universiade or 30th Winter Universiade, and commonly known as Lucerne 2021, is a cancelled multi-sport event for student and youth athletes that was scheduled to take place from 11 to 21 December 2021 in Lucerne, Switzerland, with preliminary competition in some events beginning 6 December 2021. The Games were to be hosted at venues in cantons of Central Switzerland, including Lucerne, Nidwalden, Obwalden, Schwyz, Uri, and Zug.

Lucerne, which was the only city to bid for the Games, was named host In March 2016. On 29 November 2021, the Games were cancelled due to the COVID-19 pandemic and Omicron variant.

== Cancellation ==
The Games were originally scheduled to be held 21–31 January 2021, but were postponed indefinitely on 31 August 2020 due to COVID-19. In November, new dates in December 2021 were announced. On 29 November 2021, only one week prior to the start of preliminary competition, it was announced that the 2021 Winter Universiade had been cancelled due to travel restrictions imposed by the Swiss government to prevent the spread of Omicron variant. The Games would not be rescheduled.

Due to the cancellation, the handover to Lake Placid was held at a ceremony at the University of Turin in January 2022, concurrent with the lighting of the flame for the 2021 Summer World University Games in Chengdu (which, in May 2022, were subsequently postponed to 2023).

== Venues ==
The organisation of the event was a joint project of Central Switzerland's six cantons, the city of Lucerne, and the Canton of Grisons. The Games were to use existing infrastructure, with all sports facilities accessible by public transport.

Venue	Sports Venue	Discipline(s)
Andermatt-Realp (UR)	Realp Nordic Center	Cross-country skiing
Engelberg (OW)	Sporting Park	Curling
Engelberg (OW)	Jochpass 2222	Snowboard, freestyle skiing
Lenzerheide (GR)	Biathlon Arena Lenzerheide	Biathlon, Ski Orienteering
Lucerne (LU)	Regional Ice Center	Figure skating, short track speed skating
Stoos (SZ)	Franz-Heinzer-Piste / Maggiweid	Alpine skiing
Sursee (LU)	Sursee Ice Center	Ice hockey
Zug (ZG)	Bossard Arena	Ice hockey

== Sports ==
The 2021 Winter Universiade was to consist of 60 events in 10 sports, the smallest programme of a winter Universiade since Tarvisio 2003.

- Alpine skiing (9)
- Biathlon (8)
- Cross-country skiing (11)
- Curling (2)
- Figure skating (3)
- Freestyle skiing (4)
- Ice hockey (2)
- Ski-orienteering (5)
- Short track speed skating (8)
- Snowboarding (8)

Out of the three slots given to the organizing committee to add "optional", discretionary events to the programme, the Lucerne organizing committee added only ski-orienteering. Freestyle skiing–a recurring optional event at the Winter Universiade, was promoted to the core Winter Universiade programme of "compulsory" sports beginning with these Games.

== Schedule ==
OC	Opening ceremony	●	Event competitions	1	Event finals	CC	Closing ceremony

December	6 Mon	7 Tue	8 Wed	9 Thu	10 Fri	11 Sat	12 Sun	13 Mon	14 Tue	15 Wed	16 Thu	17 Fri	18 Sat	19 Sun	20 Mon	21 Tue	Events
Ceremonies						OC										CC	
Alpine skiing							2		1	1	1	1	1	2			9
Biathlon								2		2	2		2				8
Cross-country skiing							2	2		1		2	2	2			11
Curling	●	●	●	●	●	●	●	●	2								2
Figure skating												●	1	1	1		3
Freestyle skiing										2				2			4
Ice hockey					●	●	●	●	●	●	●	●	●	●	1	1	2
Short track speed skating							2	2	4								8
Ski-orienteering									2		2	1					5
Snowboarding									2	2		2		2			8
Total events							6	6	11	8	5	6	6	9	2	1	60
Cumulative total							6	12	23	31	36	42	48	57	59	60	
December	6 Fri	7 Sat	8 Sun	9 Mon	10 Tue	11 Wed	12 Thu	13 Fri	14 Sat	15 Sun	16 Mon	17 Tue	18 Wed	19 Thu	20 Tue	21 Tue	Events

== Marketing ==
=== Emblem ===
The emblem was designed by Peter J. Wardis, consisting of six intersecting "U" letters that are arranged to form a snowflake, representing the six cantons hosting the Games (with Lucerne represented by a point at the centre of the emblem).

=== Mascot ===
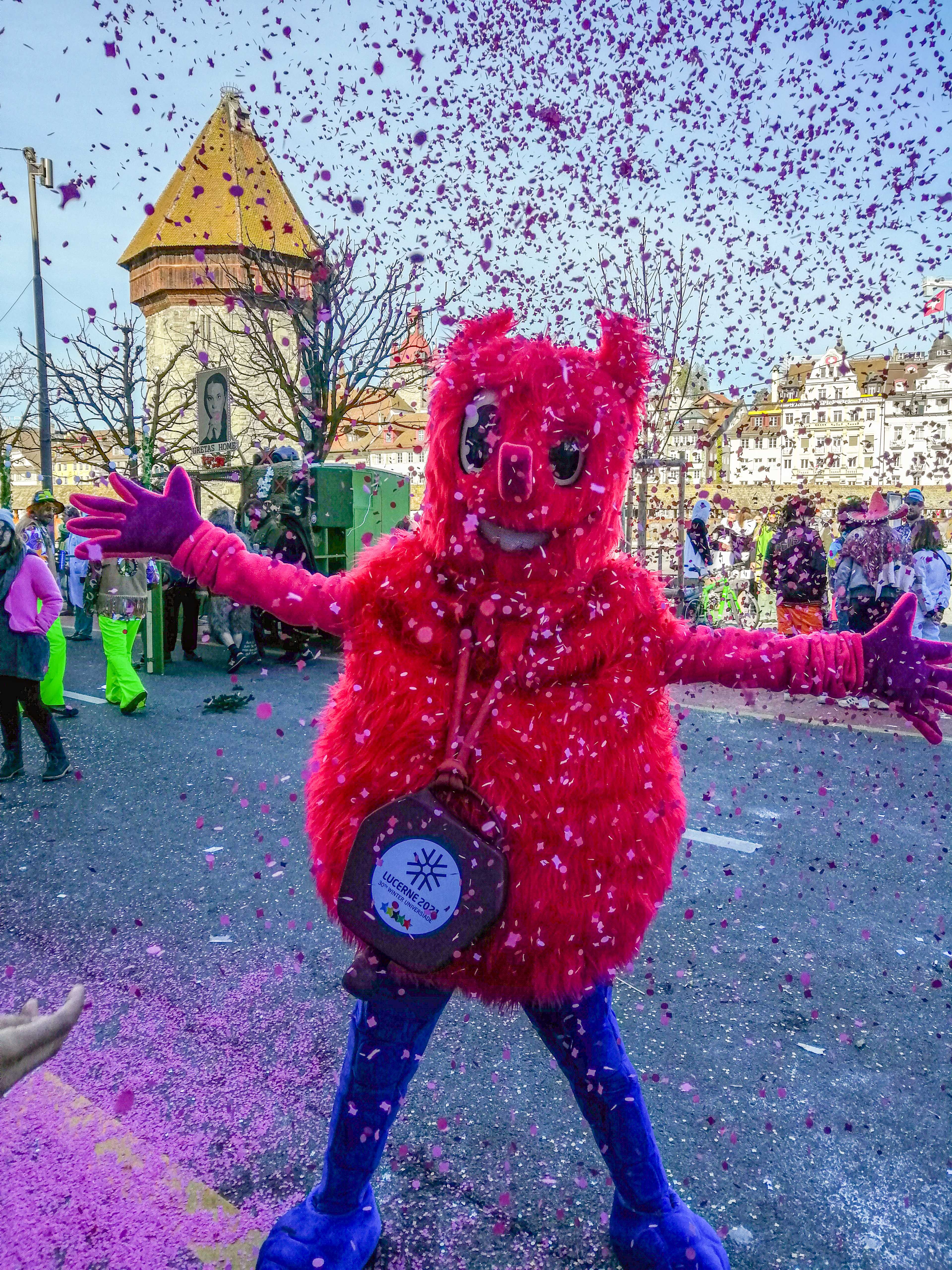
Wuli at the Lucerne Carnival (Swiss German: Lozärner Fasnacht) in March 2020

Wuli, the Lucerne 2021 mascot was designed by Luisa Zürcher, an animation student at the Lucerne School of Art and Design, and was unveiled at a ceremony marking the one-year milestone before the Games. Zürcher's design was inspired by yeti folklore, the mountains and myths of Central Switzerland, and Fasnacht, the Carnival festival that has deep roots in the traditions of Central Switzerland. The name is a combination of the initials of "Winter Universiade" with the typical Swiss word ending "-li". It was chosen by the public in an online vote.
