= Ojanen =

Ojanen is a Finnish surname. Notable people with the surname include:

- Kaarle Ojanen (chess player) (1918–2009), Finnish chess player
- Mirja Ojanen (born 1967), Finnish ski-orienteering competitor
- Janne Ojanen (born 1968), Finnish professional ice hockey player
- Juho Ojanen (born 2002), Finnish footballer
