= Jonas Engdahl =

Swedish ski-orienteering competitor

Medal record

Representing Sweden

Men's ski orienteering

World Championships
| Gold medal – first place | 1990 Skellefteå | Relay |

Jonas Engdahl is a Swedish ski-orienteering competitor. He competed at the 1990 World Ski Orienteering Championships in Skellefteå, where he placed 7th in the classic distance, and won a gold medal in the relay for Sweden, together with Bo Engdahl, Stig Mattsson and Anders Björkman.
