= Ski-orienteering at the Winter World University Games =

- Events: 10 (men: 5; women: 5)

Games
- 1959; 1960; 1961; 1962; 1963; 1964; 1965; 1966; 1967; 1968; 1970; 1970; 1973; 1972; 1975; 1975; 1977; 1978; 1979; 1981; 1983; 1985; 1987; 1989; 1991; 1993; 1995; 1997; 1999; 2001; 2003; 2005; 2007; 2009; 2011; 2013; 2015; 2017; 2019; 2021; 2025

Ski-orienteering events were introduced at the Universiade in 2019.

== Events ==
Event	19	Years
Men's sprint	•	1
Men's middle	•	1
Men's pursuit	•	1
Women's sprint	•	1
Women's middle	•	1
Women's pursuit	•	1
Mixed team relay	•	1

== Medalists ==
=== Men ===
==== Sprint ====
Year	Gold	Silver	Bronze
2019	(Russia) Vladislav Kiselev	(Norway) Audun Heimdal	(Russia) Sergey Gorlanov
2025	(Norway) Teodor Hjelseth	(Sweden) Jonathan Stahl	(Czech Republic) Josef Nagy

==== Middle ====
Year	Gold	Silver	Bronze
2019	(Norway) Jørgen Baklid	(Russia) Sergey Gorlanov	(Russia) Vladislav Kiselev
2025	not included in the program		

==== Pursuit ====
Year	Gold	Silver	Bronze
2019	(Russia) Sergey Gorlanov	(Russia) Vladislav Kiselev	(Finland) Misa Tuomala
2025	not included in the program		

=== Women ===
==== Sprint ====
Year	Gold	Silver	Bronze
2019	(Finland) Liisa Nenonen	(Russia) Marina Viatkina	(Finland) Mirka Suutari
2025	(Finland) Amanda Yli-Futka	(Norway) Idunn Strand	(Switzerland) Delia Giezendanner

==== Middle ====
Year	Gold	Silver	Bronze
2019	(Finland) Liisa Nenonen	(Russia) Marina Viatkina	(Czech Republic) Petra Hancová
2025	not included in the program		

==== Pursuit ====
Year	Gold	Silver	Bronze
2019	(Russia) Marina Viatkina	(Finland) Mirka Suutari	(Finland) Liisa Nenonen
2025	not included in the program		

=== Mixed ===
==== Sprint relay ====
Year	Gold	Silver	Bronze
2019	Russia 1 Marina Viatkina; Sergey Gorlanov	Norway 1 Evine Westli Andersen; Jørgen Baklid	Norway 2 Tilla Farnes Hennum; Audun Heimdal
2025	Finland 1 Amanda Yli-Futka; Niklas Ekström	Sweden 1 Anna Aasa; Jonathan Ståhl	Switzerland 1 Delia Giezendanner; Corsin Boos

== Medal table ==
Last after the 2025 Winter World University Games

Rank	Nation	Gold	Silver	Bronze	Total
1	Russia (RUS)	4	4	2	10
2	Finland (FIN)	4	1	3	8
3	Norway (NOR)	2	3	1	6
4	Sweden (SWE)	0	2	0	2
5	Czech Republic (CZE)	0	0	2	2
5	Switzerland (SUI)	0	0	2	2
Totals (6 entries)		10	10	10	30
