= Marie Lund =

Swedish ski-orienteering competitor

Medal record

Representing Sweden

Women's Ski-orienteering

World Championships
Silver medal – second place	2004 Östersund	Middle
Silver medal – second place	2005 Levi	Relay
Bronze medal – third place	2004 Östersund	Relay

World Cup
Bronze medal – third place	2006	Overall WC

Junior World Championships
Silver medal – second place	1999 Jundola	Classic

Marie Lund is a Swedish ski-orienteering competitor.

She won individual silver medal in the middle distance at the 2004 World Ski Orienteering Championships in Östersund, finished 5th in the sprint, and received a bronze medal in the relay.

At the 2005 World Ski Orienteering Championships she won a silver medal with the Swedish relay team, which consisted of herself, Ingela Jönsson and Stina Grenholm, and she finished 5th in the sprint, 5th in the long, and 6th in the middle course.

Lund finished overall 3rd in the World Cup in Ski Orienteering in 2006.
