= 2021 World Ski Orienteering Championships =

International ski orienteering competition

2021 World Championships
- Location: Kääriku, Estonia
- Dates: 24−28 February

The 2021 World Ski Orienteering Championships were held from 24 to 28 February 2021 in Kääriku, Estonia.

== Medal summary ==
=== Medal table ===
* Host nation (Estonia)

Rank	Nation	Gold	Silver	Bronze	Total
1	Neutral Athletes	2	1	2	5
1	Norway	2	1	2	5
3	Estonia*	2	1	1	4
4	Sweden	1	4	1	6
5	Switzerland	0	0	1	1
Totals (5 entries)		7	7	7	21

=== Men ===
Event	Gold		Silver		Bronze	
Sprint	Vladislav Kiselev; Neutral Athletes	16:59	Audun Heimdal; Norway	17:16	Jørgen Baklid; Norway	17:17
Pursuit	Audun Heimdal; Norway	1:05:39	Andrey Lamov; Neutral Athletes	1:05:49	Vladislav Kiselev; Neutral Athletes	1:05:50
Middle	Jørgen Baklid; Norway	51:56	Markus Lundholm; Sweden	53:33	Nicola Müller; Switzerland	53:38

=== Women ===
Event	Gold		Silver		Bronze	
Sprint	Daisy Kudre; Estonia	15:22	Anna Magdalena Olsson; Sweden	15:39	Anna Ulvensøen; Norway	15:44
Pursuit	Lisa Larsen; Sweden	1:05:44	Daisy Kudre; Estonia	1:06:03	Evelina Wickbom; Sweden	1:06:09
Middle	Daisy Kudre; Estonia	50:23	Anna Magdalena Olsson; Sweden	50:40	Alena Trapeznikova; Neutral Athletes	51:22

=== Mixed ===
Event	Gold		Silver		Bronze	
Sprint relay	Neutral Athletes 1 Alena Trapeznikova; Andrey Lamov	42:34	Sweden 2 Lisa Larsen; Erik Blomgren	42:35	Estonia 1 Daisy Kudre; Mattis Jaama	42:36
