= Stig Mattsson =

Swedish ski-orienteering competitor

Medal record

Representing Sweden

Men's ski orienteering

World Championships
Gold medal – first place	1990 Skellefteå	Relay
Silver medal – second place	1988 Kuopio	Relay
Silver medal – second place	1990 Skellefteå	Long

World Cup
Silver medal – second place	1989	Overall WC

Stig Mattsson is a Swedish ski-orienteering competitor. He won a silver medal in the long distance at the 1990 World Ski Orienteering Championships in Skellefteå, and a gold medal in the relay for Sweden, together with Jonas Engdahl, Bo Engdahl and Anders Björkman. He placed overall second in the World Cup in Ski Orienteering in the 1989 season.
