= Bo Engdahl =

Swedish ski-orienteering competitor

Medal record

Representing Sweden

Men's ski orienteering

World Championships
Gold medal – first place	1990 Skellefteå	Relay

World Cup
Silver medal – second place	1991	Overall WC

Bo Engdahl is a Swedish ski-orienteering competitor. He competed at the 1990 World Ski Orienteering Championships in Skellefteå, and won a gold medal in the relay for Sweden, together with Jonas Engdahl, Stig Mattsson and Anders Björkman. He placed overall second in the World Cup in Ski Orienteering in the 1991 season. He won the 1989 and 1999 editions of the Jukola relay.
