= Riitta Karjalainen =

Finnish orienteer and ski-orienteer

Medal record

Representing Finland

Women's Ski-orienteering

World Championships
Silver medal – second place	1992 Chapelle de Bois	Relay

World Cup
Silver medal – second place	1993	Overall WC

Riitta Karjalainen (born 26 May 1968) is a Finnish orienteering and ski-orienteering competitor.

She won a silver medal in the relay at the 1992 World Ski Orienteering Championships in France, together with Mirja Ojanen and Virpi Juutilainen. She finished second overall in the World Cup in Ski Orienteering in 1993.
