= David Andersson (orienteer) =

Swedish orienteer

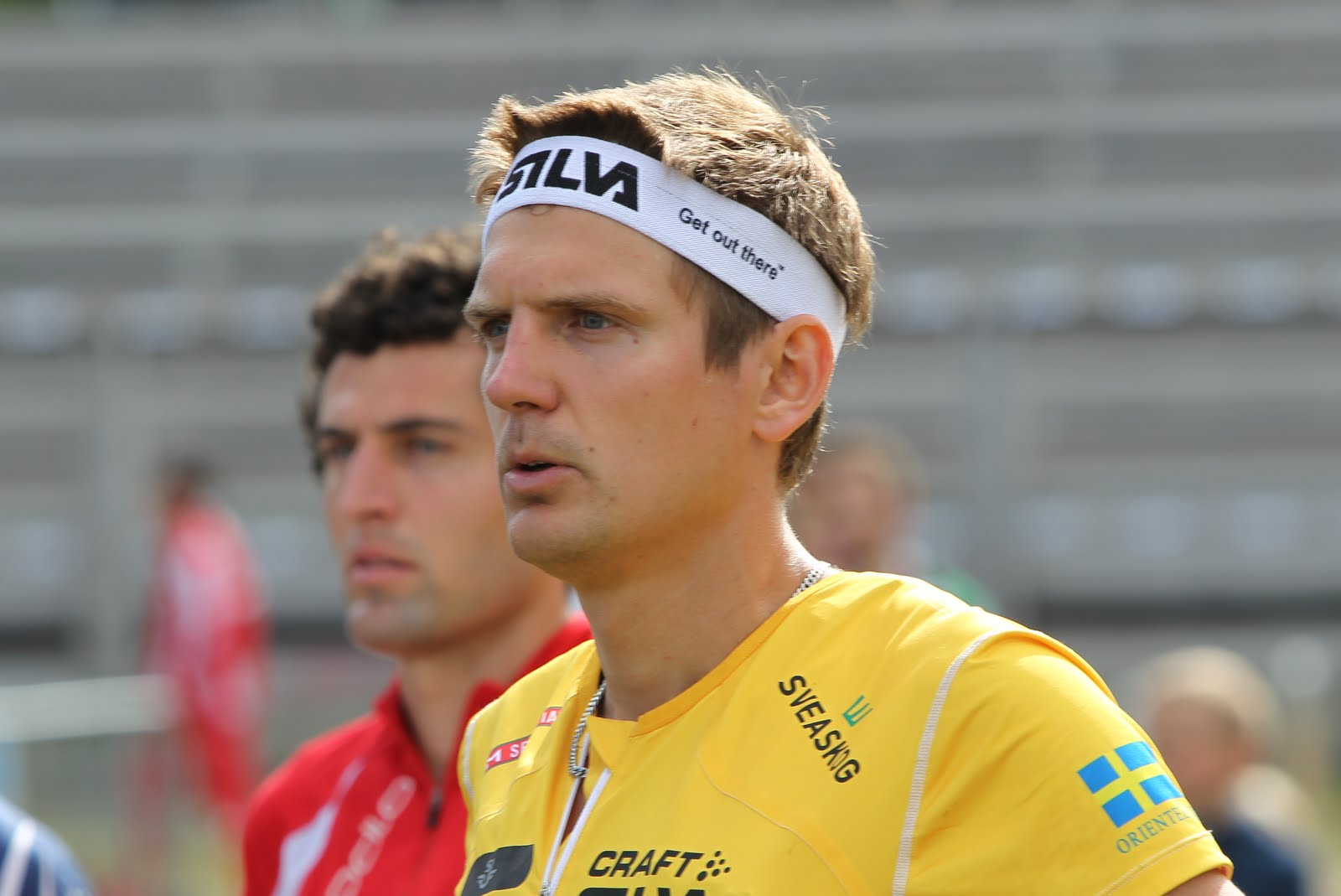
- Andersson in 2010

Medal record

Representing Sweden

Men's orienteering

World Championships
Silver medal – second place	2007 Kyiv	Relay
Bronze medal – third place	2011 Savoie	Relay

European Championships
Gold medal – first place	2006 Otepää	Relay

Junior World Championships
Silver medal – second place	2000 Nove Mesto na Morave	Relay
Bronze medal – third place	2001 Miskolc	Relay

Men's ski orienteering

Junior World Championships
Gold medal – first place	2001 Trentino	Short
Silver medal – second place	2000 Banská Bystrica	Short

David Andersson (born 25 December 1981) is a Swedish orienteering competitor and European champion.

He received a gold medal in relay at the European Orienteering Championships in 2006 in Otepää, together with Niclas Jonasson and Peter Öberg.

He received a silver medal in relay at the 2007 World Orienteering Championships in Kyiv, together with Peter Öberg and Emil Wingstedt.

He received a gold medal at the 2001 Junior World Ski Orienteering Championships.
