= Arja =

Arja may refer to:

- Árja Dhirkot is a town in Bagh District, Pakistan
- Arja (drama), Balinese dance-opera
- Árja, Norwegian Sami political party
- Polyura arja, butterfly found in India and Southeast Asia
- Arja (given name), Finnish given name
