= Vesa Mäkipää =

Finnish ski-orienteering competitor

Medal record

Representing Finland

Men's Ski-orienteering

World Championships
Silver medal – second place	1992 Pontarlier	Long
Silver medal – second place	1992 Pontarlier	Short

World Cup
Gold medal – first place	1995	Overall WC
Gold medal – first place	1997	Overall WC

Vesa Mäkipää (born 21 January 1965) is a Finnish ski-orienteering competitor and two times winner of the overall world cup.

He won silver medals in both the long and the short course at the 1992 World Ski Orienteering Championships in Pontarlier. He finished first overall in the World Cup in Ski Orienteering in 1995, and again first in 1997.

== See also ==
- Finnish orienteers
- List of orienteers
- List of orienteering events
