= Tatiana Kozlova =

Russian orienteer

Medal record

Representing Russia

Women's orienteering

Junior World Championships
Gold medal – first place	2006 Druskininkai	Relay

Women's ski-orienteering

World Championships
Bronze medal – third place	2007 Russia	Sprint
Gold medal – first place	2011 Sweden	Relay
Silver medal – second place	2011 Sweden	Long
Bronze medal – third place	2013 Kazakhstan	Sprint
Silver medal – second place	2013 Kazakhstan	Middle
Silver medal – second place	2013 Kazakhstan	Long
Gold medal – first place	2013 Kazakhstan	Relay

Junior World Championships
Gold medal – first place	2005 S-chanf	Sprint
Gold medal – first place	2006 Ivanovo	Sprint
Gold medal – first place	2006 Ivanovo	Middle
Silver medal – second place	2006 Ivanovo	Long

Tatiana Kozlova (born November 26, 1986) is a Russian orienteering and ski-orienteering competitor and junior world champion in both sports.

== Orienteering ==
She won a gold medal in the relay at the 2006 Junior World Orienteering Championships in Druskininkai, together with Ekaterina Terekhova and Maria Shilova. She finished 5th in the long course at the 2006 junior world championship.

== Ski orienteering ==
Kozlova received a bronze medal in sprint at the 2007 World Ski Orienteering Championships (shared with Liisa Anttila).

She received two individual gold medals and one silver medal at the Junior World Ski Orienteering Championships in Ivanovo in 2006.
