= Ski-orienteering at the 2019 Winter Universiade =

Ski-orienteering at the XXIX Winter Universiade
- Dates: 4–10 March 2019

Ski-orienteering at the 2019 Winter Universiade was held at the Raduga Cluster of the Winter Sports Academy in Krasnoyarsk from 4 to 10 March. It was the first edition of that sport at the Winter Universiade.

== Men's events ==
Event	Gold		Silver		Bronze	
Sprint	(Russia) Vladislav Kiselev	15:46	(Norway) Audun Heimdal	15:50	(Russia) Sergey Gorlanov	15:57
Pursuit	(Russia) Sergey Gorlanov	34:38	(Russia) Vladislav Kiselev	35:48	(Finland) Misa Tuomala	35:59
Middle	(Norway) Jørgen Baklid	35:25	(Russia) Sergey Gorlanov	35:28	(Russia) Vladislav Kiselev	35:37

== Women's events ==
Event	Gold		Silver		Bronze	
Sprint	(Finland) Liisa Nenonen	14:04	(Russia) Marina Viatkina	14:25	(Finland) Mirka Suutari	14:41
Pursuit	(Russia) Marina Viatkina	31:38	(Finland) Mirka Suutari	33:19	(Finland) Liisa Nenonen	33:21
Middle	(Finland) Liisa Nenonen	37:07	(Russia) Marina Viatkina	37:14	(Czech Republic) Petra Hancová	37:26

== Mixed events ==
Event	Gold		Silver		Bronze	
Sprint relay	Russia 1 Marina Viatkina; Sergey Gorlanov	47:39	Norway 1 Evine Westli Andersen; Jørgen Baklid	48:42	Norway 2 Tilla Farnes Hennum; Audun Heimdal	48:44

== Medal table ==
* Host nation (Russia)

Rank	Nation	Gold	Silver	Bronze	Total
1	Russia*	4	4	2	10
2	Finland	2	1	3	6
3	Norway	1	2	1	4
4	Czech Republic	0	0	1	1
Totals (4 entries)		7	7	7	21
