= Olli-Markus Taivainen =

Finnish ski-orienteer (born 1989)

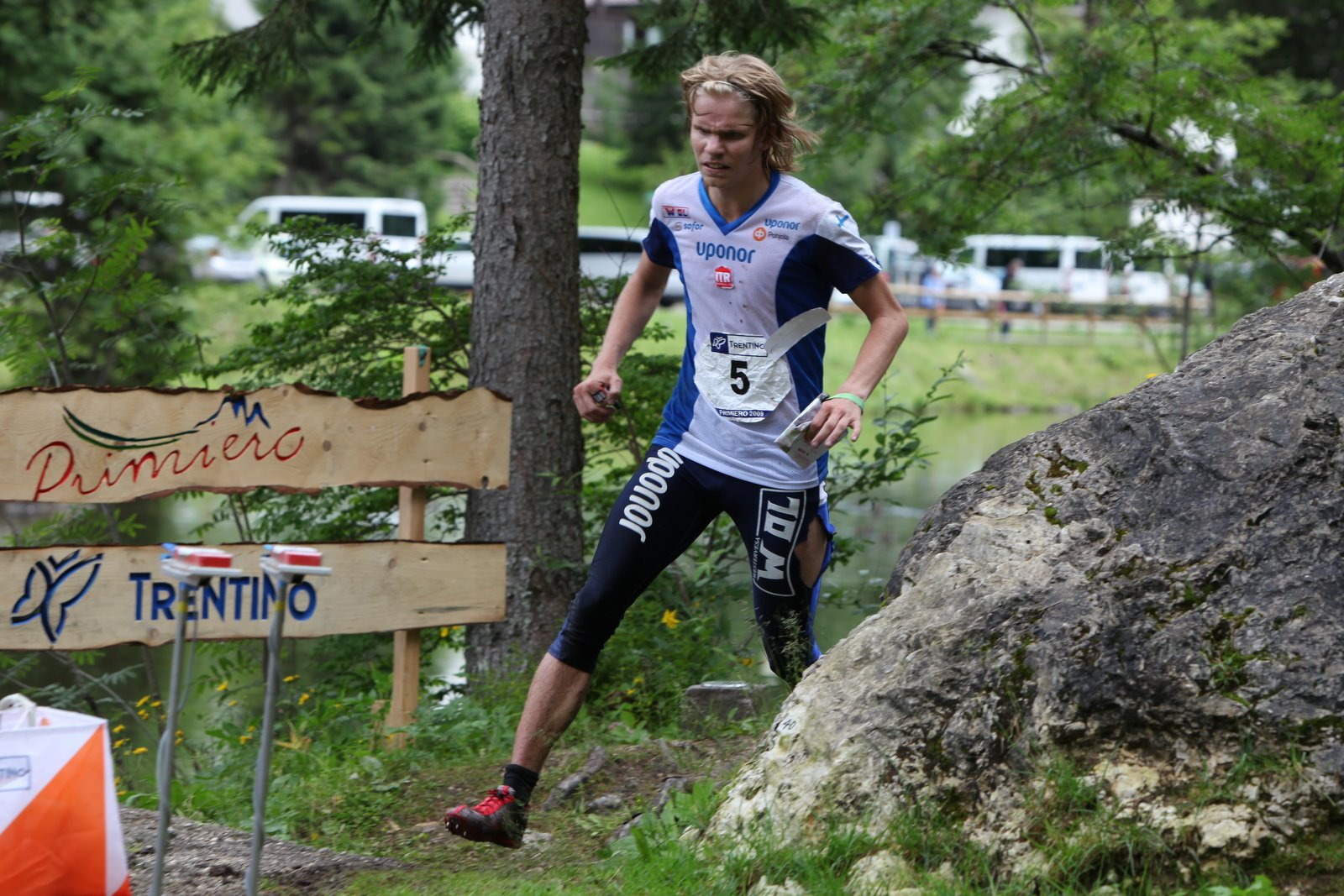
- Olli-Markus Taivainen at JWOC 2009 middle

Personal information
- Born: 2 May 1989 (age 37)
Medal record
Representing Finland
Men's ski-orienteering
World Championships
Gold medal – first place	2011 Tänndalen	Relay
Gold medal – first place	2011 Tänndalen	Sprint
Gold medal – first place	2009 Rusutsu	Middle
Silver medal – second place	2009 Rusutsu	Sprint
Bronze medal – third place	2009 Rusutsu	Long
Junior World Championships
Silver medal – second place	2007 Salzburg	Long
Silver medal – second place	2008 Dospat	Long
Gold medal – first place	2009 Dalarna	Long
Silver medal – second place	2006 Ivanovo	Middle
Gold medal – first place	2009 Dalarna	Middle
Bronze medal – third place	2006 Ivanovo	Sprint
Gold medal – first place	2007 Salzburg	Sprint
Gold medal – first place	2009 Dalarna	Sprint
Men's orienteering
Junior World Championships
Gold medal – first place	2009 Primiero	Middle

Olli-Markus Taivainen (born 2 May 1989) is a Finnish ski-orienteering competitor and former World Champion. He won a gold medal in the middle distance, a silver medal in the sprint and a bronze medal in the long distance at the 2009 World Ski Orienteering Championships.

He was featured as athlete of the month by the International Orienteering Federation in March 2011.

== See also ==
- Finnish orienteers
- List of orienteers
- List of orienteering events
