= Johan Edin =

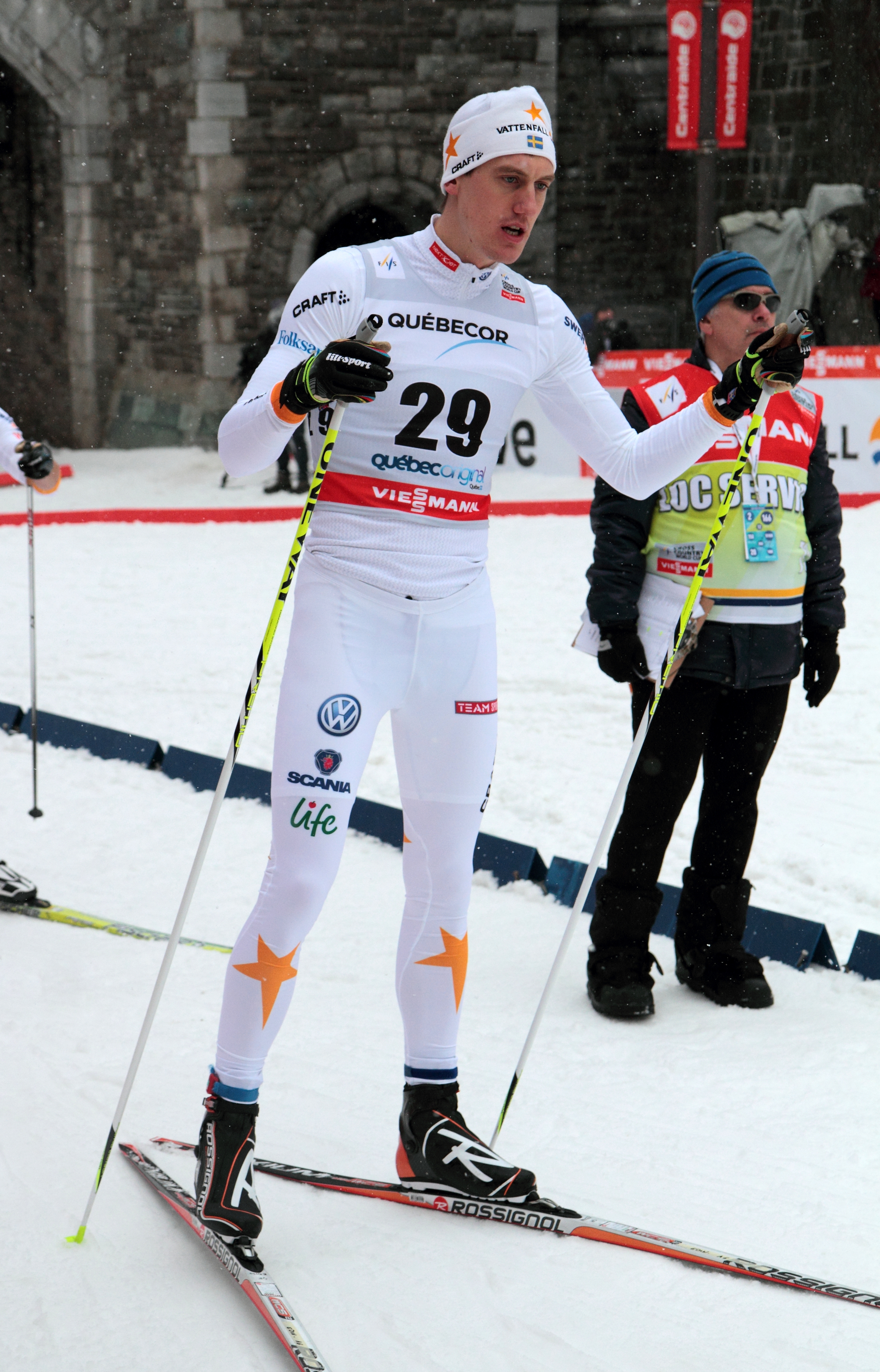

Personal information
- Full name: Johan Edin
- Nationality: Sweden
- Born: 9 February 1987 (age 39) Sundsvall, Sweden

Sport
- Sport: Skiing
- Club: IFK Mora SK

World Cup career
- Seasons: 9 – (2006, 2008–2010, 2012–2017)
- Indiv. starts: 37
- Indiv. podiums: 0
- Team starts: 2
- Team podiums: 0
- Overall titles: 0 – (78th in 2013)
- Discipline titles: 0
Medal record
Representing Sweden
Men's ski-orienteering
Junior World Championships
Gold medal – first place	2007 Salzburg	Relay
Bronze medal – third place	2007 Salzburg	Sprint

Johan Edin (born 9 February 1987) is a Swedish cross-country skier and ski orienteering competitor. He was born in Sundsvall.

He competed in the World Cup 2014 and 2015 seasons.

At the Junior World Ski Orienteering Championships in Salzburg in 2007, he won a bronze medal in the sprint competition, as well of being part of the Swedish winning team in the relay.

== Cross-country skiing results ==
All results are sourced from the International Ski Federation (FIS).

=== World Championships ===
Year	Age	15 km individual	30 km skiathlon	50 km mass start	Sprint	4 × 10 km relay	Team sprint
2015	28	—	—	—	43	—	—

=== World Cup ===
==== Season standings ====
Season	Age	Discipline standings			Ski Tour standings			
Season	Age	Overall	Distance	Sprint	Nordic Opening	Tour de Ski	World Cup Final	Ski Tour Canada
2006	19	NC	—	NC	—N/a	—N/a	—N/a	—N/a
2008	21	NC	—	NC	—N/a	—	—	—N/a
2009	22	164	—	101	—N/a	—	—	—N/a
2010	23	169	—	101	—N/a	—	—	—N/a
2012	25	85	—	40	—	—	—	—N/a
2013	26	78	—	40	—	—	—	—N/a
2014	27	95	—	44	—	—	—	—N/a
2015	28	82	—	37	—	—	—N/a	—N/a
2016	29	79	—	40	—	—	—N/a	—
2017	30	113	—	58	—	—	—	—N/a
