= Eva Svensson =

Swedish orienteer and ski-orienteer

Personal information
- Nationality: Swedish
- Born: 27 May 1987 (age 39)

Sport
- Sport: Orienteering; Ski orienteering
Medal record
Representing Sweden
Women's orienteering
Junior World Championships
Gold medal – first place	2007 Dubbo	Sprint
Silver medal – second place	2006 Druskininkai	Relay
Silver medal – second place	2007 Dubbo	Relay
Bronze medal – third place	2006 Druskininkai	Sprint
Women's ski orienteering
Junior World Championships
Gold medal – first place	2005 S-chanf	Long
Gold medal – first place	2005 S-chanf	Middle
Gold medal – first place	2007 Salzburg	Long
Gold medal – first place	2007 Salzburg	Middle
Gold medal – first place	2007 Salzburg	Relay
Bronze medal – third place	2006 Ivanovo	Long
Bronze medal – third place	2007 Salzburg	Sprint

Eva Svensson (born 27 May 1987) is a Swedish orienteering and ski-orienteering competitor, and junior world champion in both sports.

== Orienteering ==
She became Junior World Champion in sprint in Dubbo in 2007, and received a bronze medal in 2006. She received silver medals in relay in both the 2006 and 2007 junior world championships.

== Ski orienteering ==
Svensson received four individual gold medals and two bronze medals at the Junior World Ski Orienteering Championships in 2005, 2006 and 2007. At the Junior World Ski Orienteering Championships in Salzburg in 2007, she won a gold medal in the long distance, a gold medal in the middle distance, a bronze medal in the sprint, as well as being part of the Swedish winning team in the relay.
