= Pekka Varis =

Finnish ski-orienteering competitor

Medal record

Representing Finland

Men's Ski-orienteering

World Championships
Silver medal – second place	1998 Windischgarsten	Long

World Cup
Silver medal – second place	1997	Overall WC

Pekka Varis (born 1972) is a Finnish ski-orienteering competitor. He won a silver medal in the long distance at the 1998 World Ski Orienteering Championships. He placed second in the overall World Cup in 1997.

== See also ==
- List of orienteers
- List of orienteering events
