= Stanimir Belomazhev =

Bulgarian ski orienteering runner

Medal record

Representing Bulgaria

Men's Ski-orienteering

World Championships
Gold medal – first place	2017 Krasnoyarsk	Middle
Silver medal – second place	2015 Hamar	Middle
Silver medal – second place	2015 Hamar	Sprint
Bronze medal – third place	2013 Ridder	Relay

European Championships
Gold medal – first place	2015 Lenzerheide	Sprint
Gold medal – first place	2014 Tyumen	Long
Gold medal – first place	2013 Madona	Sprint
Silver medal – second place	2015 Lenzerheide	Relay
Silver medal – second place	2014 Tyumen	Relay
Bronze medal – third place	2017 Imatra	Middle
Bronze medal – third place	2016 Obertilliach	Long
Bronze medal – third place	2015 Lenzerheide	Middle

World Cup
Gold medal – first place	2015	Overall WC
Silver medal – second place	2012	Overall WC

World Military Games
Silver medal – second place	2017 Sochi	Middle
Silver medal – second place	2017 Sochi	Sprint

Junior World Championships
Gold medal – first place	2008 Dospat	Long
Gold medal – first place	2008 Dospat	Middle

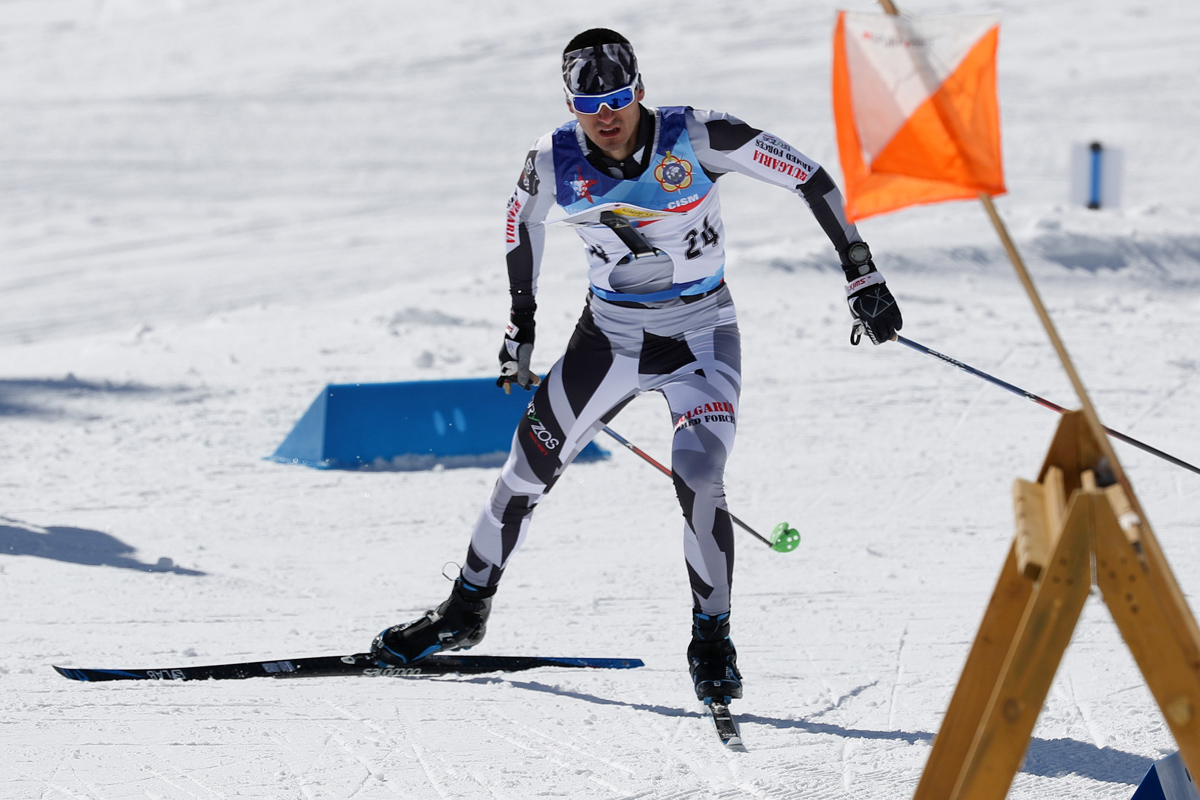
Stanimir Belomazhev

Stanimir Belomazhev (Bulgarian: Станимир Беломъжев) is a Bulgarian athlete in ski orienteering and cross-country skiing. While he started out as a skier, his greatest success came in ski orienteering, being there a three-times European champion and double World vice-champion. In February 2016 he won three titles at the first World Student Ski Orienteering Championships in Tula, Russia, in sprint, middle and pursuit.

in March 2016 he won bronze in long distance (28.5 km) at the European Ski Orienteering Championships (Obertilliach, Austria).
