= Maria Kechkina =

Russian orienteer

Personal information
- Native name: Мария Викторовна Кечкина
- Full name: Maria Viktorovna Kechkina
- Nationality: Russian
- Born: August 6, 1986 (age 39)

Sport
- Sport: Orienteering; Ski-orienteering
- Rank: 2
Medal record
Representing Russia
Women's orienteering
Junior World Championships
Gold medal – first place	2006 Druskininkai	Relay
Women's ski-orienteering
World Championships
Gold medal – first place	2019 Piteå	Middle
Gold medal – first place	2019 Piteå	Relay
Gold medal – first place	2017 Krasnoyarsk	Long
Gold medal – first place	2017 Krasnoyarsk	Relay
Bronze medal – third place	2019 Piteå	Long
Bronze medal – third place	2019 Piteå	Sprint
European Championships
Gold medal – first place	2016 Hochfilzen	Long
Gold medal – first place	2016 Hochfilzen	Middle
Gold medal – first place	2011 Lillehammer	Relay
Silver medal – second place	2016 Hochfilzen	Team sprint
Bronze medal – third place	2016 Hochfilzen	Sprint
Bronze medal – third place	2015 Lenzerheide	Relay
World Military Games
Gold medal – first place	2017 Sochi	Middle
Gold medal – first place	2017 Sochi	Relay
Gold medal – first place	2017 Sochi	Team sprint
Silver medal – second place	2017 Sochi	Sprint
Military Skiing Championships
Gold medal – first place	2015 Boden	Middle
Junior World Championships
Gold medal – first place	2006 Ivanovo	Relay
Silver medal – second place	2006 Ivanovo	Sprint
Bronze medal – third place	2006 Ivanovo	Middle

Maria Viktorovna Kechkina, née Shilova (Russian: Мария Викторовна Кечкина; born 6 August 1986) is a Russian orienteering and ski-orienteering competitor and Junior World Champion in both sports.

== Orienteering ==
Kechkina won a gold medal in the relay at the 2006 Junior World Orienteering Championships in Druskininkai, together with Ekaterina Terekhova and Tatiana Kozlova. She finished 8th in the long course and 10th in the sprint at the same championship.

== Ski orienteering ==
Shilova received a gold medal in relay, a silver medal in sprint and a bronze medal in the middle distance at the Junior World Ski Orienteering Championships in Ivanovo in 2006.
