= Ulrik Nordberg =

Swedish ski orienteering competitor

Personal information
- Born: 22 August 1993 (age 32)

Sport
- Sport: Ski orienteering
- Club: Umea OK
Medal record
Representing Sweden
Men's ski orienteering
World Championships
Gold medal – first place	2017 Krasnoyarsk	Sprint
Silver medal – second place	2017 Krasnoyarsk	Relay

Ulrik Nordberg (born 22 August 1993) is a Swedish ski orienteering competitor.

He won a gold medal in men's sprint at the 2017 World Ski Orienteering Championships.
