= Katja Rajaniemi =

Finnish ski-orienteering competitor

Medal record

Representing Finland

Women's Ski-orienteering

World Championships
Bronze medal – third place	2005 Levi	Sprint

Katja Rajaniemi is a Finnish ski-orienteering competitor. She won a bronze medal in the sprint at the 2005 World Ski Orienteering Championships.

== See also ==
- Finnish orienteers
- List of orienteers
- List of orienteering events
