= Audun Heimdal =

Norwegian orienteer (1997–2022)

Personal information
- Born: 8 February 1997
- Died: 20 August 2022 (aged 25)

Sport
- Sport: Ski orienteering; Orienteering
- Club: Konnerud IL (Ski-O); NTNUI (Foot-O)
Medal record
Representing Norway
Men's ski orienteering
World Championships
Gold medal – first place	2021 Kääriku	Pursuit
Silver medal – second place	2019 Piteå	Middle
Silver medal – second place	2021 Kääriku	Sprint
Bronze medal – third place	2019 Piteå	Relay
Winter Universiade
Silver medal – second place	2019 Krasnoyarsk	Sprint
Bronze medal – third place	2019 Krasnoyarsk	Sprint relay
Junior World Championships
Silver medal – second place	2016 Obertilliach	Relay
Bronze medal – third place	2015 Hamar	Middle
Bronze medal – third place	2016 Obertilliach	Sprint
Men's orienteering
World Championships
Silver medal – second place	2021 Doksy	Mixed sprint relay
Junior World Championships
Gold medal – first place	2017 Tampere	Relay
Silver medal – second place	2017 Tampere	Middle
Bronze medal – third place	2016 Engadin	Middle

Audun Heimdal (8 February 1997 – 20 August 2022) was a Norwegian orienteering and ski orienteering competitor.

== Biography ==
Heimdal won a silver medal in the middle distance at the 2019 World Ski Orienteering Championships. He also won a gold medal in pursuit and a silver medal in sprint at the 2021 World Ski Orienteering Championships. Competing at the 2021 World Orienteering Championships, he won a silver medal in the mixed sprint relay, along with Victoria Hæstad Bjørnstad, Kasper Fosser and Andrine Benjaminsen.

Heimdal was diagnosed with cancer in 2022 and died on 20 August, at the age of 25.
