= Arja Nuolioja =

Finnish ski-orienteering competitor

Medal record

Representing Finland

Women's Ski-orienteering

World Championships
Gold medal – first place	1996	Short
Bronze medal – third place	1996	Long

World Cup
Gold medal – first place	1993	Overall WC
Gold medal – first place	1995	Overall WC

Arja Nuolioja (born 1 December 1968) is a Finnish ski-orienteering competitor and world champion.

She received an individual gold medal in the short distance, and a bronze medal in the long course at the 1996 World Ski Orienteering Championships in Lillehammer.

She finished first overall in the World Cup in Ski Orienteering in 1993 and 1995.

== See also ==
- Finnish orienteers
- List of orienteers
- List of orienteering events
