= Arja (given name) =

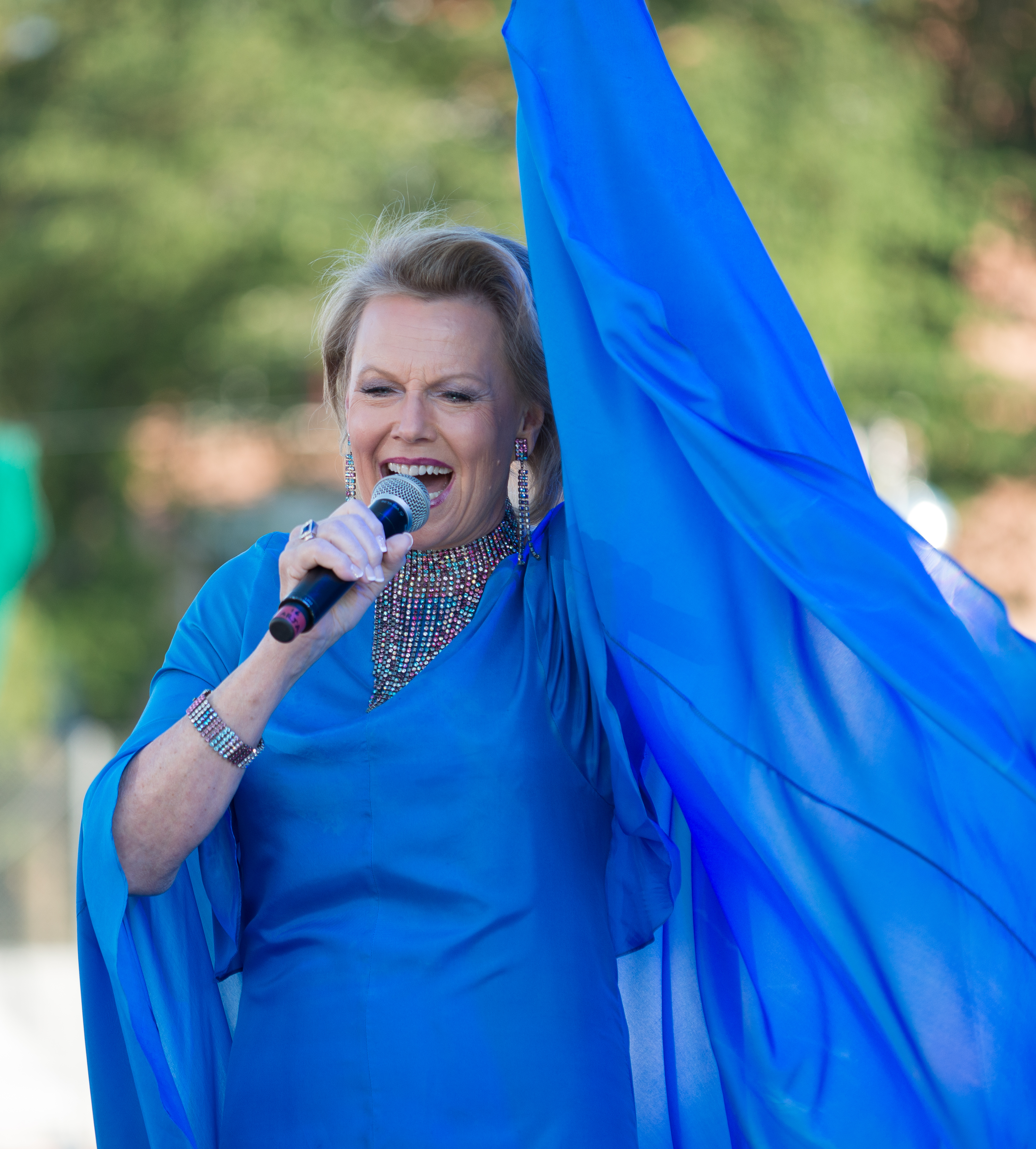
Arja Saijonmaa

Arja is a Finnish female name and may refer to:

- Arja Alho (born 1954), Finnish politician
- Arja Hannus, Swedish orienteering competitor
- Arja Kajermo, cartoonist, born in Finland, raised in Sweden, currently residing in Ireland
- Arja Koriseva (born 1965), award-winning Finnish singer
- Arja Nuolioja, Finnish ski-orienteering competitor and world champion
- Arja Saijonmaa (born 1944), Finnish singer, political activist and occasional actress
- Arja Salafranca (born 1971), South African writer, poet and journalist
