= Annika Zell =

Swedish orienteer

Medal record

Representing Sweden

Women's Ski-orienteering

World Championships
Gold medal – first place	1992 Pontarlier	Long
Gold medal – first place	1996 Lillehammer	Long
Gold medal – first place	1998 Windischgarsten	Short
Silver medal – second place	1998 Windischgarsten	Long
Silver medal – second place	1996 Lillehammer	Short
Bronze medal – third place	1990 Skellefteå	Long
Bronze medal – third place	1992 Pontarlier	Short

World Cup
Silver medal – second place	1991	Overall WC
Silver medal – second place	2000	Overall WC
Bronze medal – third place	1999	Overall WC

Annika Zell is a Swedish orienteering and ski-orienteering competitor, and world champion in ski-orienteering. In May 2018, it was announced that she would coach Team Sweden in women's cross-country skiing together with Magnus Ingesson beginning in the 2018–2019 season. On 17 April 2019, she announced she would leave that position.

== Ski orienteering ==
Zell won an individual gold medal in the long course at the 1992 World Ski Orienteering Championships in Pontarlier, and again in 1996 in Lillehammer. She won the short distance in 1998.

She finished second in the overall World Cup in Ski Orienteering in 1991 and in 2000, and finished third in 1999.

== Foot orienteering ==
Zell won the multi-day orienteering race O-Ringen both in 1993 and in 1996. She finished fifth in the overall Orienteering World Cup in 1992.
