= Ekaterina Terekhova =

Russian orienteer

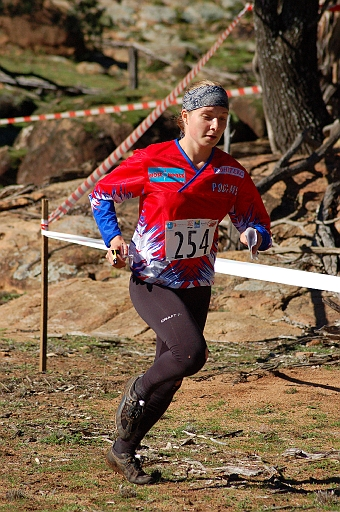
- Ekaterina Terekhova at JWOC 2007

Medal record

Women's orienteering

Representing Russia

Junior World Championships
Gold medal – first place	2006 Druskininkai	Relay

Ekaterina Terekhova (born 1987) is a Russian orienteering competitor and junior world champion.

She won a gold medal in the relay at the 2006 Junior World Orienteering Championships in Druskininkai, together with Tatiana Kozlova and Maria Shilova. She finished 5th in the sprint at the same championship.
