= Sergey Gorlanov =

Russian ski orienteering competitor

Personal information
- Born: 6 June 1996 (age 30)

Sport
- Sport: Ski orienteering
- Club: Khabarovsk krai
Medal record
Representing Russia
Men's ski orienteering
World Championships
Gold medal – first place	2019 Piteå	Sprint
Gold medal – first place	2019 Piteå	Relay
Bronze medal – third place	2017 Krasnoyarsk	Sprint
Winter Universiade
Gold medal – first place	2019 Krasnoyarsk	Pursuit
Gold medal – first place	2019 Krasnoyarsk	Sprint relay
Silver medal – second place	2019 Krasnoyarsk	Middle
Bronze medal – third place	2019 Krasnoyarsk	Sprint

Sergey Yuryevich Gorlanov (Russian: Сергей Юрьевич Горланов; born 6 June 1996) is a Russian ski orienteering competitor.

He won a bronze medal in men's sprint at the 2017 World Ski Orienteering Championships.
