= Andrey Lamov =

Russian ski orienteer

Andrei Lamov
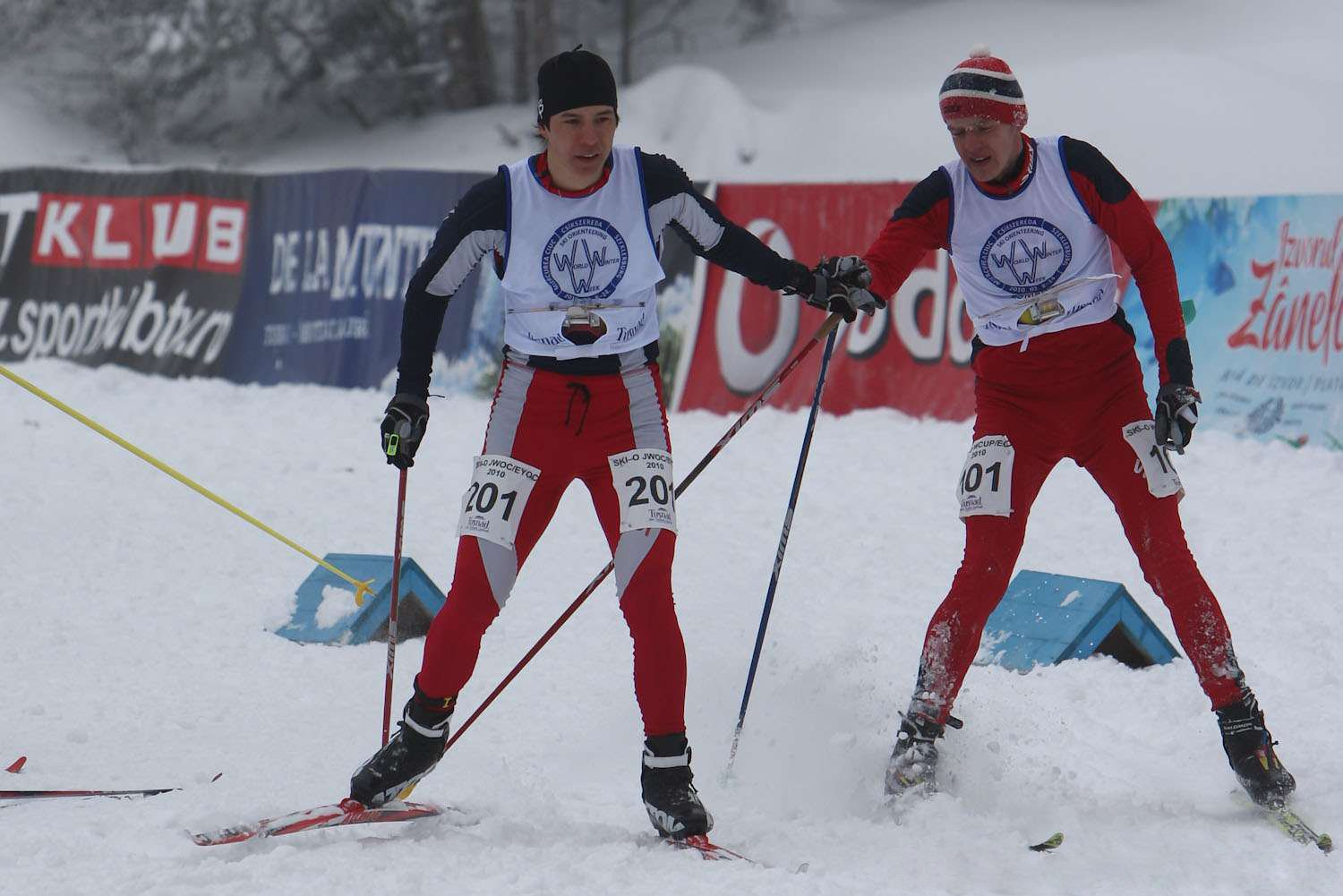
- Andrei Lamov at the 2010 European Championships

Personal information
- Native name: Андрей Леонидович Ламов
- Full name: Andrei Leonidovich Lamov
- Nationality: Russian
- Citizenship: Swedish
- Born: March 9, 1986 (age 40) Cherepovets, RSFSR, Soviet Union

Sport
- Sport: Ski-orienteering
- Rank: 1
Medal record
Representing Russia
Men's Ski-orienteering
World Championships
Gold medal – first place	2019 Piteå	Long
Gold medal – first place	2019 Piteå	Relay
Gold medal – first place	2017 Krasnoyarsk	Relay
Gold medal – first place	2015 Hamar / Løten	Sprint
Gold medal – first place	2009 Rusutsu	Long
Gold medal – first place	2009 Rusutsu	Sprint
Silver medal – second place	2017 Krasnoyarsk	Sprint
Silver medal – second place	2015 Hamar / Løten	Long
Silver medal – second place	2013 Ridder	Sprint
Silver medal – second place	2013 Ridder	Middle
Silver medal – second place	2011 Tänndalen	Middle
European Championships
Gold medal – first place	2018 Velingrad	Middle
Gold medal – first place	2017 Imatra	Sprint
Gold medal – first place	2017 Imatra	Sprint Relay
Gold medal – first place	2017 Imatra	Long
Gold medal – first place	2016 Obertilliach	Sprint Relay
Gold medal – first place	2015 Lenzerheide	Middle
Gold medal – first place	2014 Tyumen	Sprint
Silver medal – second place	2016 Obertilliach	Sprint
Silver medal – second place	2016 Obertilliach	Middle
Silver medal – second place	2016 Obertilliach	Relay
Silver medal – second place	2015 Lenzerheide	Relay
Silver medal – second place	2014 Tyumen	Middle
Silver medal – second place	2014 Tyumen	Long
Silver medal – second place	2014 Tyumen	Relay
Silver medal – second place	2013 Madona	Relay
Silver medal – second place	2012 Lillehammer	Long
Silver medal – second place	2010 Miercurea-Ciuc	Sprint
Bronze medal – third place	2015 Lenzerheide	Sprint
Bronze medal – third place	2015 Lenzerheide	Long
Bronze medal – third place	2013 Hochfilzen	Middle
World Cup
Gold medal – first place	2013–14	Overall
Bronze medal – third place	2008	Overall
World Military Games
Gold medal – first place	2017 Sochi	Relay
Junior World Championships
Gold medal – first place	2006 Ivanovo	Sprint
Gold medal – first place	2006 Ivanovo	Middle
Gold medal – first place	2006 Ivanovo	Long
Gold medal – first place	2006 Ivanovo	Relay
Gold medal – first place	2005 S-chanf	Relay
Silver medal – second place	2004 Vuokatti	Middle
Bronze medal – third place	2005 S-chanf	Long
Bronze medal – third place	2004 Vuokatti	Relay

Andrei Leonidovich Lamov (Russian: Андрей Леонидович Ламов; born 9 March 1986) is a Swedish-russian ski-orienteering competitor and world champion. He is a six-time World Champion.

He placed third in the overall World Cup in Ski Orienteering in 2007–18.
