= Kääriku =

Village in Estonia

- Village
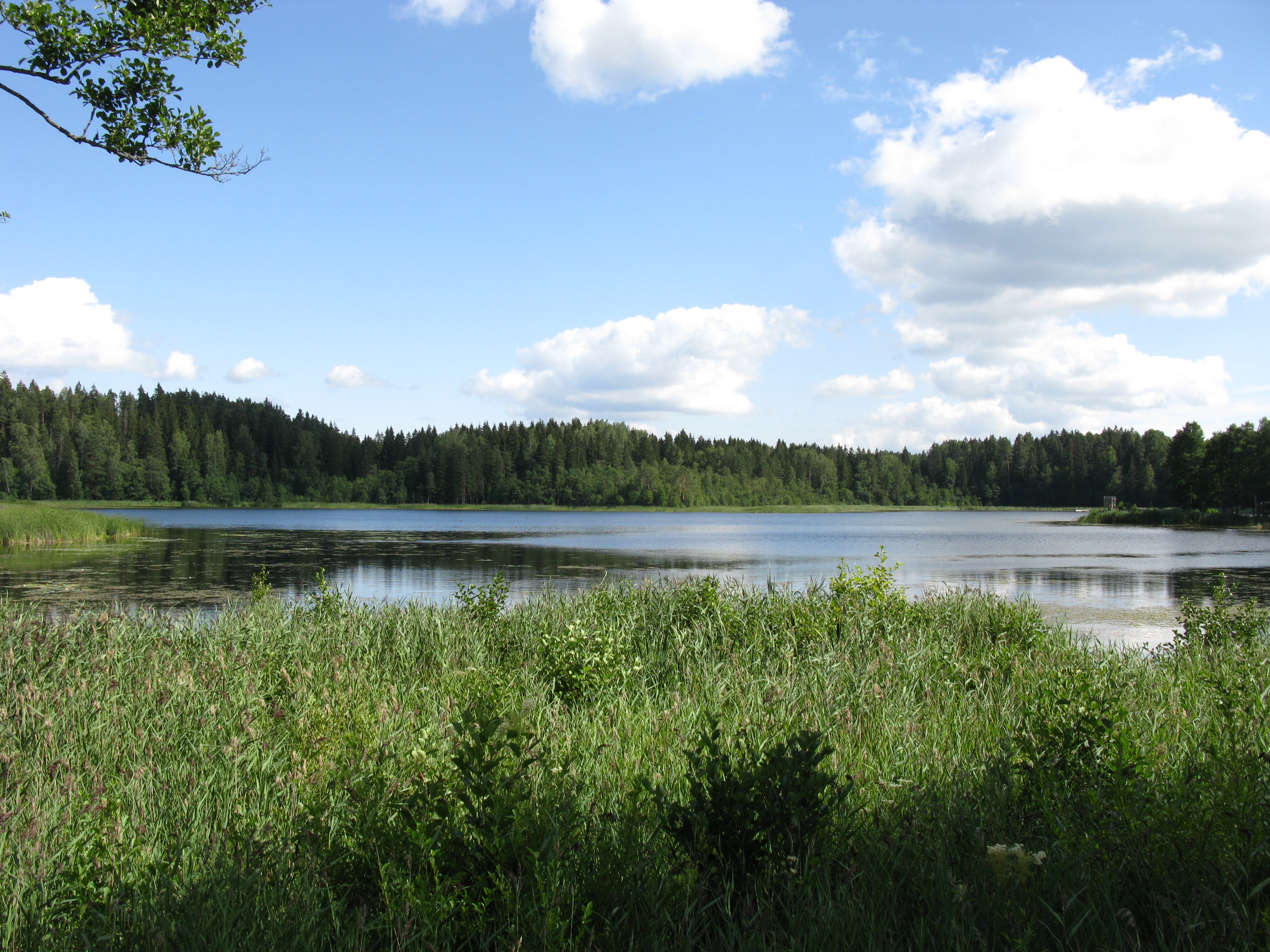
- Lake Kääriku

- Location in Estonia
- Coordinates: 58°00′25″N 26°23′42″E
- Country: Estonia
- County: Valga County
- Municipality: Otepää Parish

Population (5 January 2013)
  - Total: 48

Kääriku is a village in Otepää Parish, Valga County in southeastern Estonia. It has a population of 48 as of 5 January 2013. It is famous for the sports complex dispersed around the west side of Lake Kääriku.

== Population history ==
Kääriku had a population of 53 on 7 February 2008. On 5 January 2013 it decreased to 48.
