= Anastasia Kravchenko =

Russian ski-orienteer

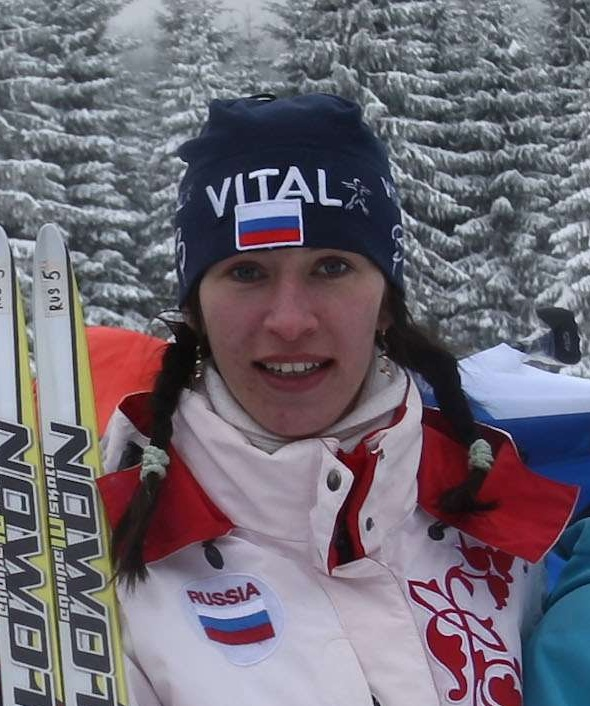

Personal information
- Native name: Анастасия Александровна Кравченко
- Full name: Anastasia Alexandrovna Kravchenko
- Nationality: Russian
- Born: February 24, 1986 (age 40) Komsomolsk-on-Amur, RSFSR, Soviet Union

Sport
- Sport: Ski-orienteering
- Rank: 18
Medal record
Representing Russia
Women's Ski-orienteering
World Championships
Gold medal – first place	2013 Ridder	Middle
Gold medal – first place	2013 Ridder	Relay
Gold medal – first place	2009 Rusutsu	Long
Silver medal – second place	2009 Rusutsu	Relay
European Championships
Gold medal – first place	2013 Madona	Relay
Gold medal – first place	2013 Madona	Team sprint
Gold medal – first place	2011 Lillehammer	Relay
Silver medal – second place	2014 Tyumen	Relay
Silver medal – second place	2013 Madona	Middle
Silver medal – second place	2012 Sumy	Long
Silver medal – second place	2010 Miercurea-Ciuc	Relay
Bronze medal – third place	2014 Tyumen	Long
World Military Games
Gold medal – first place	2017 Sochi	Relay
Bronze medal – third place	2017 Sochi	Sprint

Anastasia Alexandrovna Kravchenko (Russian: Анастасия Александровна Кравченко; born 24 February 1986) is a Russian ski-orienteering competitor and World Champion. She won a gold medal in the long course, and a silver medal in the relay at the 2009 World Ski Orienteering Championships.
