= World Cup in Ski Orienteering =

International ski orienteering competition during the northern hemisphere winter

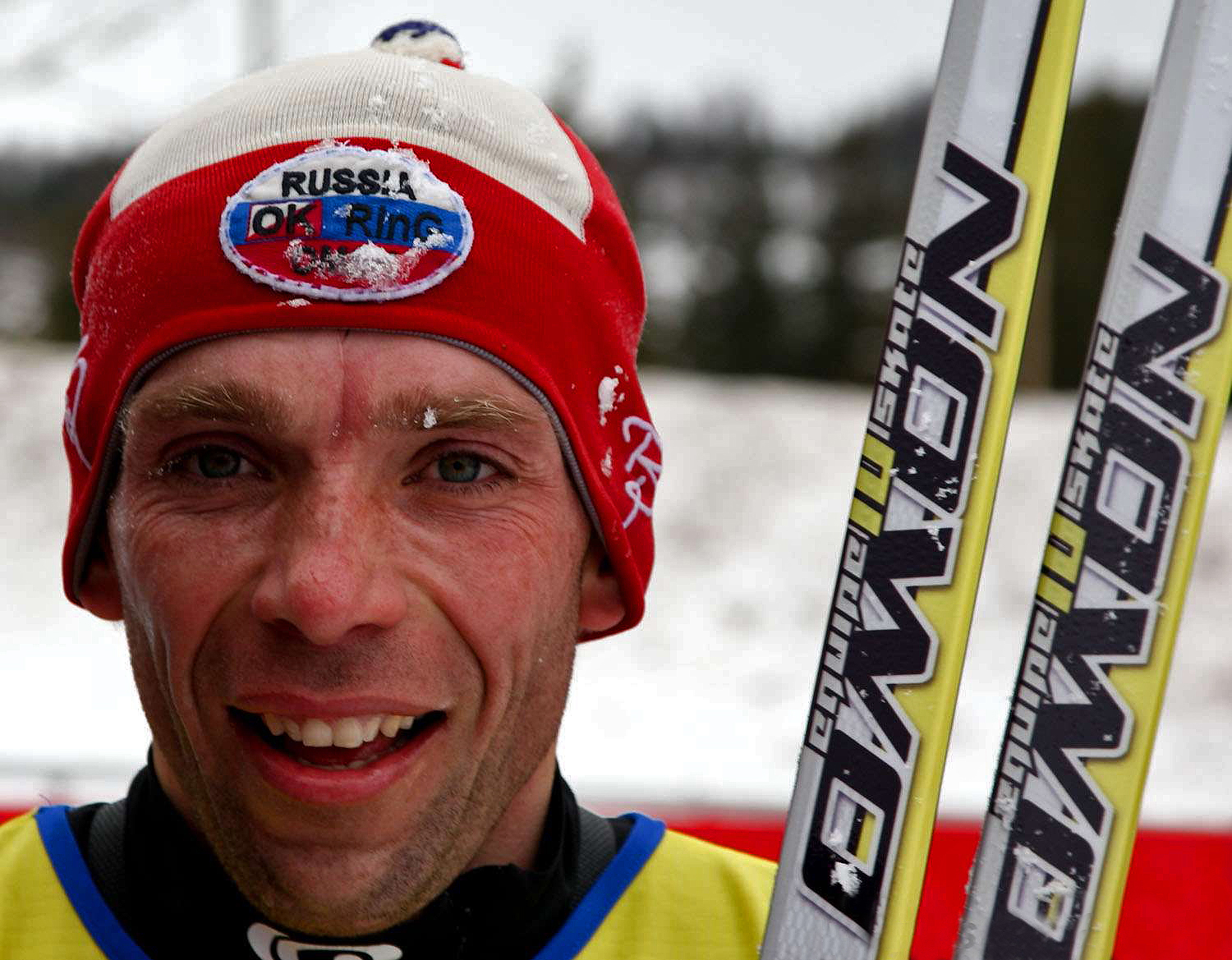
- Russia's Eduard Khrennikov is a four-time winner of the men's overall competition.
- Status: active
- Genre: sporting event
- Date: November–March
- Frequency: usually biennial
- Location: various
- Inaugurated: 1989
- Organiser: IOF

The World Cup in Ski Orienteering is a series of ski-orienteering competitions organized by the International Orienteering Federation. The first official World Cup was held in 1989, then every second year up to 1999, and then in 2000, 2001, 2003, 2006, and 2007–2008.

== World Cup overall results ==
=== Men ===
Year	1st	2nd	3rd	Notes
1989	(Norway) Vidar Benjaminsen	(Sweden) Stig Mattson	(Finland) Anssi Juutilainen	
1991	(Finland) Anssi Juutilainen	(Sweden) Bo Engdahl	(Norway) Vidar Benjaminsen	
1993	(Norway) Vidar Benjaminsen	(Norway) Lars Lystad	(Norway) Harald Svergja	
1995	(Finland) Vesa Mäkipää	(Finland) Raino Pesu	(Norway) Vidar Benjaminsen	
1997	(Finland) Vesa Mäkipää	(Finland) Pekka Varis	(Sweden) Bertil Nordqvist	
1999	(Finland) Raino Pesu	(Sweden) Björn Lans	(Sweden) Bertil Nordqvist	
2000	(Russia) Eduard Khrennikov	(Russia) Andrei Gruzdev	(Finland) Jukka Lanki	
2001	(Finland) Matti Keskinarkaus	(Finland) Jukka Lanki	(Russia) Eduard Khrennikov	
2003	(Russia) Eduard Khrennikov	(Sweden) Bertil Nordqvist	(Finland) Arto Lilja	
2006	(Russia) Eduard Khrennikov	(Sweden) Tomas Löfgren	(Finland) Staffan Tunis	
2007/08	(Sweden) Erik Rost	(Sweden) Peter Arnesson	(Russia) Andrei Lamov	
2009/10	(Russia) Eduard Khrennikov	(Finland) Staffan Tunis	(Russia) Andrey Grigoriev	
2011/12	(Finland) Staffan Tunis	(Sweden) Peter Arnesson	(Russia) Andrey Grigoriev	
2013/14	(Russia) Andrei Lamov	(Norway) Hans Jørgen Kvåle	(Norway) Lars Hol Moholdt	

=== Women ===
Year	1st	2nd	3rd	Notes
1989	(Finland) Virpi Juutilainen	(Norway) Ragnhild Bratberg	(Sweden) Ann Charlotte Karlsson	
1991	(Sweden) Arja Hannus	(Sweden) Annika Zell	(Finland) Virpi Juutilainen	
1993	(Finland) Arja Nuolioja	(Finland) Riitta Karjalainen	(Norway) Hilde Gjermundshaug Pedersen	
1995	(Finland) Arja Nuolioja	(Sweden) Lena Hasselström	(Norway) Hilde Gjermundshaug Pedersen	
1997	(Norway) Hilde Gjermundshaug Pedersen	(Finland) Liisa Anttila	(Finland) Terhi Holster	
1999	(Sweden) Arja Hannus	(Sweden) Lena Hasselström	(Sweden) Annika Zell	
2000	(Sweden) Lena Hasselström	(Sweden) Annika Zell	(Sweden) Arja Hannus	
2001	(Sweden) Lena Hasselström	(Russia) Tatiana Vlasova	(Norway) Stine Hjermstad Kirkevik	
2003	(Russia) Natalia Tomilova	(Russia) Tatiana Vlasova	(Sweden) Stina Grenholm	
2006	(Norway) Stine Hjermstad Kirkevik	(Russia) Tatiana Vlasova	(Sweden) Marie Lund	
2007/08	(Russia) Tatiana Vlasova	(Finland) Liisa Anttila	(Russia) Olga Shevchenko	
2009/10	(Russia) Natalia Tomilova	(Norway) Marte Reenaas	(Kazakhstan) Olga Novikova	
2011/12	(Sweden) Josefine Engström	(Sweden) Tove Alexandersson	(Russia) Polina Malchikova	
2013/14	(Russia) Tatiana Rvacheva	(Sweden) Tove Alexandersson	(Russia) Anastasia Kravchenko	

== See also ==
- International Orienteering Federation (IOF)
- Ski-orienteering
- World Ski Orienteering Championships
