= Juho Ojanen =

Finnish footballer (born 2002)

Personal information
- Date of birth: 2 January 2002 (age 24)
- Place of birth: Espoo, Finland
- Height: 1.85 m (6 ft 1 in)
- Position: Midfielder

Team information
- Current team: Harvard Crimson
- Number: 14

Youth career
- 2006–2018: Honka

College career
Years	Team	Apps	(Gls)
2022–	Harvard Crimson	11	(1)

Senior career*
Years	Team	Apps	(Gls)
2018–2019	Honka	1	(0)
2018–2019	Honka Akatemia	11	(1)
2019–2022	Greuther Fürth II	20	(2)
2022	Klubi 04	4	(1)
2023	SexyPöxyt	11	(0)

International career^{‡}
2017–2019	Finland U17	9	(0)
2019	Finland U18	2	(0)
2021	Finland U21	2	(0)
- * Club domestic league appearances and goals as of 10:14, 2 December 2023 (UTC) ‡ National team caps and goals as of 22:34, 4 January 2023 (UTC)

Juho Ojanen (born 2 January 2002) is a Finnish footballer who plays as a midfielder for Ivy League side Harvard Crimson.

== Club career ==
=== Early life ===
Born in Espoo, Ojanen joined the academy of Honka in 2006.

=== Honka ===
On 18 January 2018 Honka announced that it had signed a multi-year contract with his own protégé Juho Ojanen.

=== Greuther Fürth II ===
After a year in Honka's senior squad it was announced that Ojanen was leaving the team in an international transfer. It was later announced that his new team was Greuther Fürth.

=== Klubi 04 ===
On 17 May 2022 HJK reported that Ojanen had ended his contract with Greuther Fürth and would join HJK's reserve team Klubi 04 for the summer before joining Harvard Crimson.

=== Harvard ===
On 1 August 2022 it was reported that Harvard University would add Ojanen and seven other first-years ahead of 2022 men's soccer season.

== International career ==
Ojanen has competed on the Finland national teams at the U15-U21 levels and has been a member of the national team program since 2017. He has 26 caps for Finland youth national teams. He won the International Federation Cup in Latvia with the Finland U17 team in 2018 and captained the Finland U15 and U16 sides in 2017 and 2018.

== Career statistics ==
=== Club ===
As of match played 4 July 2022

Appearances and goals by club, season and competition
Club	Season	League			Cup		Continental		Other		Total	
Club	Season	Division	Apps	Goals	Apps	Goals	Apps	Goals	Apps	Goals	Apps	Goals
Honka	2018	Veikkausliiga	1	0	1 (Note: Appearances in the Finnish Cup)	0	–		0	0	2	0
Honka Akatemia	2018	Kakkonen	11	1	0	0	–		0	0	11	1
Greuther Fürth II	2018–19	Regionalliga Bayern	0	0	–		–		0	0	0	0
Greuther Fürth II	2019–21	Regionalliga Bayern	2	0	–		–		0	0	2	0
Greuther Fürth II	2021–22	Regionalliga Bayern	18	2	–		–		0	0	18	2
Greuther Fürth II	Total		20	2	0	0	0	0	0	0	20	2
Klubi 04	2022	Kakkonen	4	1	1	0	–		0	0	5	1
Career total			36	4	2	0	0	0	0	0	38	4
