= Jørgen Baklid =

Norwegian orienteer (born 1999)

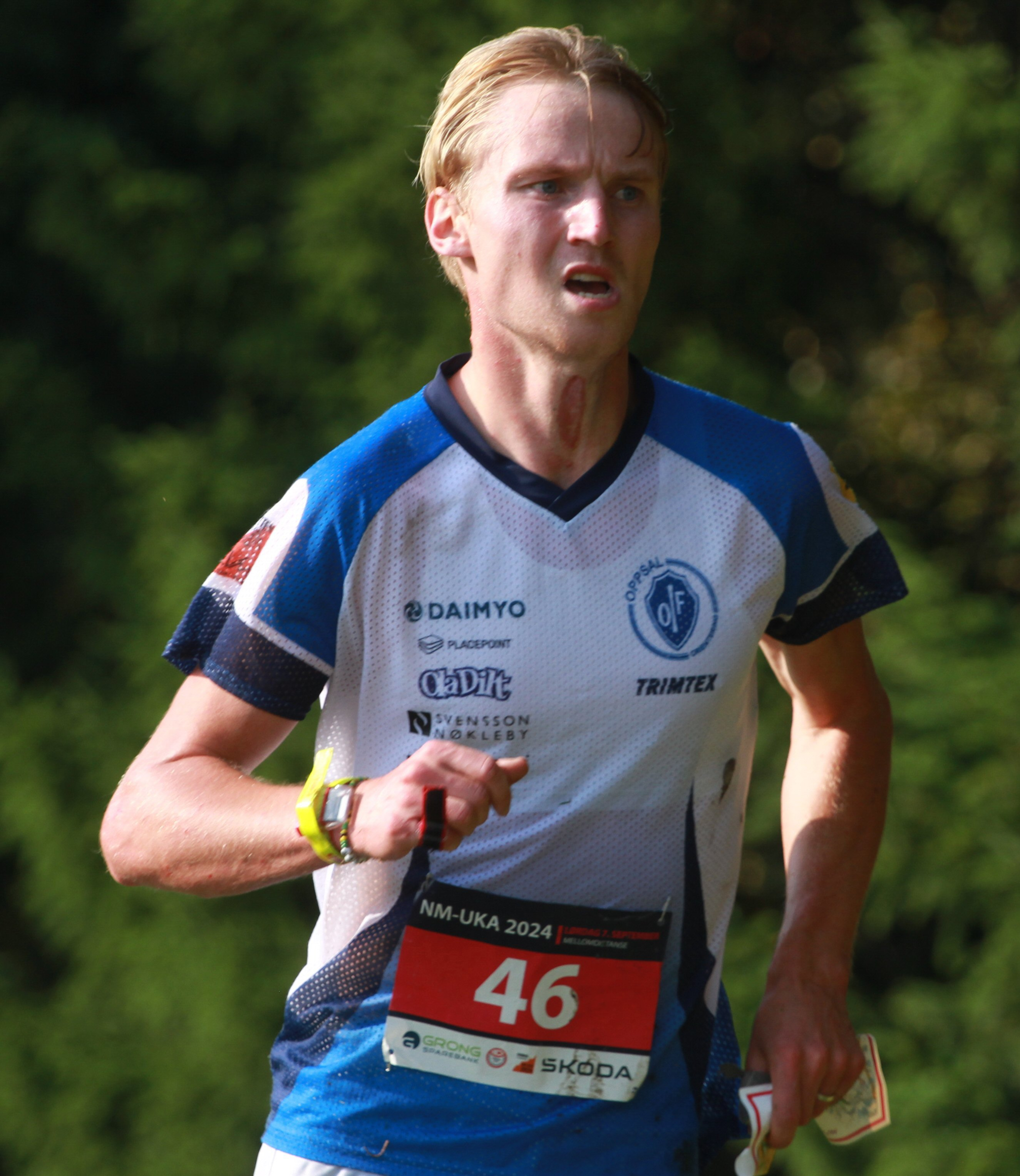

Personal information
- Born: 1999 (age 26–27)

Sport
- Sport: Ski orienteering; Orienteering
- Club: NTNUI; Konnerud IL (ski orienteering); Oppsal IF (foot orienteering)
Medal record
Representing Norway
Men's ski orienteering
World Championships
| Gold medal – first place | 2021 Kääriku | Middle |
| Gold medal – first place | 2022 Kemi Keminmaa | Pursuit |
| Gold medal – first place | 2024 Ramsau | Sprint |
| Gold medal – first place | 2024 Ramsau | Pursuit |
| Gold medal – first place | 2024 Ramsau | Middle |
| Gold medal – first place | 2024 Ramsau | Mixed relay |
| Gold medal – first place | 2026 Rusutsu | Pursuit |
| Bronze medal – third place | 2021 Kääriku | Sprint |
Men's orienteering
World Championships
| Gold medal – first place | 2025 Kuopio | Relay |
| Silver medal – second place | 2024 Edinburgh | Knockout sprint |

Jørgen Baklid (born 1999) is a Norwegian orienteering and ski orienteering competitor. His achievements in ski orienteering include winning several gold medals at the World Ski Orienteering Championships. In foot orienteering he has obtained one individual silver medal and one relay gold medal at the world championships.

He was awarded the Egebergs Ærespris in 2025.

== Sports career ==
Born in 1999, Baklid represents the clubs NTNUI and Konnerud IL in ski orienteering, and Oppsal IF in foot orienteering.

=== Ski orienteering ===
Competing at the 2021 World Ski Orienteering Championships he won a gold medal in the middel distance, and a bronze medal in sprint behind Vladislav Kiselev and Audun Heimdal.

Af the 2022 World Ski Orienteering Championships in Kemi-Keminmaa, he won a gold medal in the pursuit.

At the 2024 World Ski Orienteering Championships in Ramsau he won a gold medal in sprint, his first sprint title. He won the gold medal in pursuit, as well as in the middle distance, and a gold medal in the mixed relay along with Anna Ulvensøen.

He won another gold medal in pursuit at the 2026 World Ski Orienteering Championships.

=== Foot orienteering ===
Competing at the 2024 World Orienteering Championships in Edinburgh, Baklid won a silver medal in the knockout sprint, behind winner Riccardo Rancan.

In May 2025, Baklid won the national title in knockout sprint. He won a gold medal in the relay with the Norwegian team at the 2025 World Orienteering Championships, along with Eirik Langedal Breivik and Kasper Fosser, ahead of Switzerland (silver) and Finland (bronze).

== Awards and recognitions ==
In 2025 Baklid was awarded Egebergs Ærespris ("Honorary Prize of Egeberg") for excelling in ski orienteering, orientering and winter duathlon.
