= Anders Björkman =

Swedish ski orienteer

Medal record

Representing Sweden

Men's ski orienteering

World Championships
Gold medal – first place	1990 Skellefteå	Classic
Bronze medal – third place	1988 Kuopio	Classic
Bronze medal – third place	1990 Skellefteå	Short

Anders Björkman is a Swedish ski orienteering competitor and world champion. He won a gold medal in the classic distance at the World Ski Orienteering Championships in Skellefteå in 1990. He received individual bronze medals in 1988 and 1990.
