= Mirja Ojanen =

Finnish ski-orienteering competitor

Medal record

Representing Finland

Women's Ski-orienteering

World Championships
Silver medal – second place	1992 Chapelle de Bois	Long
Silver medal – second place	1992 Chapelle de Bois	Relay

Mirja Ojanen (born 27 November 1967 in Hämeenkyrö) is a Finnish ski-orienteering competitor. She won a silver medal in the long distance at the 1992 World Ski Orienteering Championships, and a silver medal in the relay with the Finnish team.

== See also ==
- Finnish orienteers
- List of orienteers
- List of orienteering events
