= Ski orienteering =

Winter sport combining cross-country skiing with orienteering

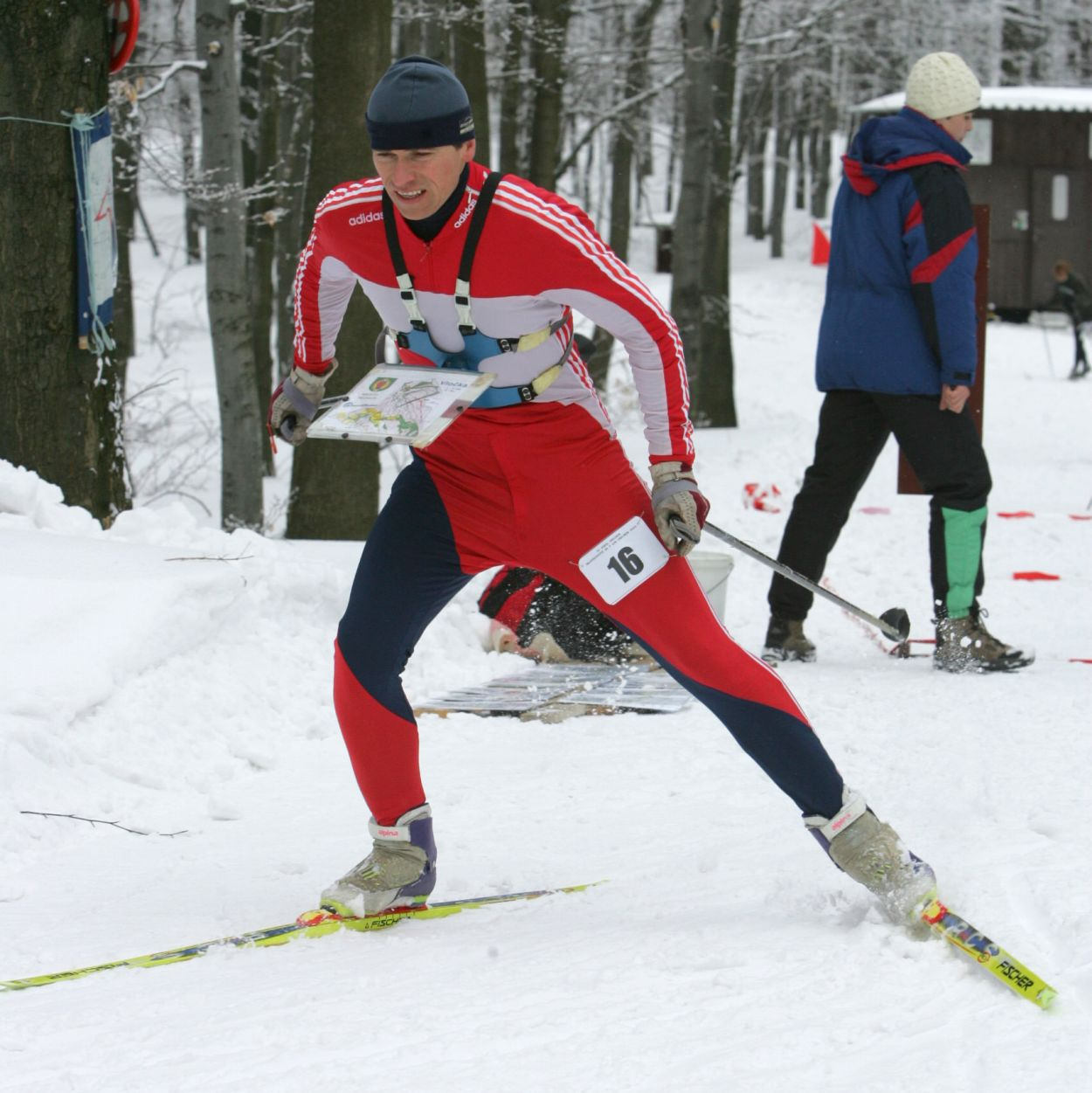
- Ski orienteering
- Highest governing body: IOF

Characteristics
- Equipment: skis, skipoles, map
- Venue: snow

Presence
- Olympic: no
- World Championships: yes
- Paralympic: no

Ski orienteering (SkiO) is a cross-country skiing endurance winter racing sport and one of the four orienteering disciplines recognized by the IOF. A successful ski orienteer combines high physical endurance, strength and excellent technical skiing skills with the ability to navigate and make the best route choices while skiing at a high speed.

Standard orienteering maps are commonly used, but since 2019, a separate mapping standard ISSkiOM has been produced which recommends a subset of the symbols used in other disciplines. Ski-orienteering maps use green symbols to indicate trails and tracks and different symbols to indicate their navigability in snow; other symbols indicate whether any roads are snow-covered or clear. Navigation tactics is similar to mountain bike orienteering. Standard skate-skiing equipment is used, along with a map holder attached to the chest. Compared to cross-country skiing, upper body strength is more important because of double-poling needed along narrow snow trails.

== Events ==
Ski orienteering events are designed to test both physical strength and navigation skills of the athletes. Ski orienteers use the map to navigate a dense ski track network in order to visit a number of control points in the shortest possible time. The track network is printed on the map, and there is no marked route in the terrain. The control points must be visited in the right order. The map gives all information the athlete needs in order to decide which route is the fastest, including the quality and width of the tracks. The athlete has to take hundreds of route choice decisions at high speed during every race: a slight lack of concentration for just a hundredth of a second may cost the medal. Ski orienteering is time-measured and objective. The clock is the judge: fastest time wins. The electronic card verifies that the athlete has visited all control points in the right order.

International competitions
The World Ski Orienteering Championships is the official event to award the titles of World Champions in Ski Orienteering. The World Championships is organized every odd year. The programme includes Sprint, Middle and Long Distance competitions, and a Relay for both men and women.

The World Cup is the official series of events to find the world's best ski orienteers over a season. The World Cup is organized every even year.

Junior World Ski Orienteering Championships and World Masters Ski Orienteering Championships are organized annually.

World-wide sport
Ski orienteering is practiced on four continents. The events take place in the natural environment, over a variety of outdoor terrains, from city parks to countryside fields, forests and mountain sides - wherever there is snow. The leading ski orienteering regions are Asia, Europe and North America.

National teams from 35 countries are expected to participate in the next World Ski Orienteering Championships to be held in Sweden in March 2011. Ski orienteering is on the programme of the Asian Winter Games and the CISM World Military Winter Games. The IOF has applied for inclusion of ski orienteering in the 2018 Olympic Winter Games and will also apply to FISU for inclusion in the 2013 Winter Universiades.

== World Rankings ==
=== Men ===
As of 23 January 2025, the highest ranked male ski-orienteerers are:

Rank	Name	Country	Points
1	Jorgen Baklid	NOR	6610
2	Niklas Ekström	FIN	6485
3	Nicola Müller	SUI	6469
4	Jonathan Sthål	SWE	6467
5	Stanimir Belomazhev	BUL	6408
6	Aapo Viippola	FIN	6406
7	Vegard Gulbrandsen	NOR	6394
8	Henrik Fredriken Aas	NOR	6391
9	Eevert Toivonen	FIN	6373
10	Teodor Mo Hjelseth	NOR	6366
11	Gion Schnyder	SUI	6346
12	Styrk Kamsvaag	NOR	6338
13	Bjørnar Kvåle	NOR	6304
14	Gustav Nordström	SWE	6303
15	Tuomas Outinen	FIN	6274
16	Albin Gezelius	SWE	6269
17	Miska Tervala	FIN	6253
18	Rasmus Wickbom	SWE	6241
19	Gustav Jonsson	SWE	6239
20	Misa Toumala	FIN	6234
21	Petr Horvat	CZE	6232
21	Josef Nagy	CZE	6232
23	Isak Lundholm	SWE	6225
24	Andrei Lamov	SWE	6217
25	Pyry Riissanen	FIN	6215

Last updated: June 2019

=== Women ===
As of 23 January 2025, the highest ranked female ski-orienteerers are:

Rank	Name	Country	Points
1	Anna Ulvensoen	NOR	6513
2	Magdalena Olsson	SWE	6440
3	Daisy Kudre Schnyder	EST	6374
4	Maria Hoskari	FIN	6311
5	Frida Sandberg	SWE	6308
6	Elin Schagerström	SWE	6305
7	Amanda Yli Futka	FIN	6284
8	Sari Vaaranen	FIN	6234
9	Eliane Deininger	SUI	6232
10	Alina Niggli	SUI	6230
11	Synne Strand	NOR	6227
12	Ella Turesson	SWE	6203
12	Linda Lindkvist	SWE	6203
14	Idunn Strand	NOR	6202
15	Nina Karna	FIN	6200
16	Heta Virtanen	FIN	6191
17	Hanna Eriksson	SWE	6174
18	Kaisa Klementtinen	FIN	6164
19	Ane Sofie Krogh	NOR	6148
20	Aasne Haavengen	NOR	6145
21	Antoniya Grigorova	BUL	6138
22	Doris Kudre	EST	6118
23	Anna Aasa	SWE	6112
24	Birgit Dorthea Kleppa Madslien	NOR	6109
25	Delia Giezendanner	SUI	6108

Last updated: June 2019

== Equipment ==
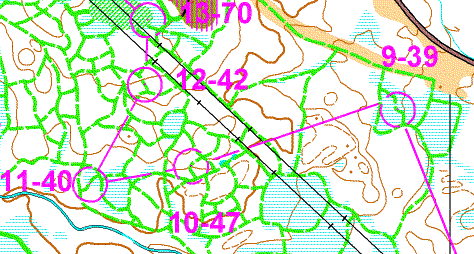
Ski orienteering map

A person taking part in competitions in ski orienteering is equipped with:

- Clothing adequate for cross-country skiing, boots and skis and ski poles.

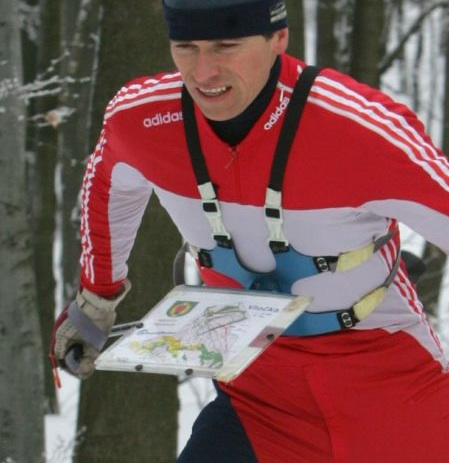
Map holder worn on chest

- An orienteering map provided by the organizer, showing the control points which must be visited in order. The map is designed to give all the information the competitor needs to decide which route is the fastest, such as the quality of the tracks, gradient and distance. Green lines on the map show a trail suited to race on skis. Depending on the thickness and continuity of the lines, the competitor makes decisions about which route is the fastest between control points.
- Map holder: a map holder attached to the chest makes it possible to view the map while skiing at full speed.
- Optionally lighter type of compass is attached to the map holder or to the skier's arm.
- An electronic punching chip (see orienteering control point).

== Bid for inclusion in 2018 Winter Olympic Games ==
The International Orienteering Federation (IOF) had applied for ski orienteering to be included in the programme of the 2018 Olympic Winter Games. However this was unsuccessful. In the past few years, ski orienteering has grown considerably in terms of global spread. The growth has been boosted by the inclusion of ski orienteering into the Asian Winter Games and the CISM World Military Winter Games.
