= List of 2001 World Games medal winners =

The 2001 World Games were held in Akita, Japan, from August 16 to August 26, 2001.

== Acrobatic gymnastics ==
Event	Gold	Silver	Bronze
Men's pair	China; Li Renjie; Song Min	Russia; Aleksandr Privalov; Ivan Poletaev	Belarus; Aliaksei Liubezny; Anatoli Baravikou
Men's group	Russia; Aleksey Shcherbakov; Vadim Galkin; Aleksey Ermichkin; Dmitry Bulkin	China; Yan Song; Liu Feng; Liu Huifeng; Hu Xin	Portugal; Pedro Emídio; João Oliveira; Sérgio Mateus; Vítor Silva
Women's pair	Russia; Anna Mokhova; Yulia Lopatkina	Belgium; Aline Van den Weghe; Elke Van Maldegem	Great Britain; Gemma Middleton; Amy Clarke
Women's group	Russia; Svetlana Kushu; Elena Arakelian; Ekaterina Lysenko	China; Huang Cuiling; Feng Jiepeng; Li Caidan	Belarus; Katsiaryna Katsuba; Zinaida Sazonava; Viktoryia Arabei
Mixed pair	Russia; Andrey Yakovlev; Polina Lymareva	United States; Julian Amaro; Shenea Booth	Great Britain; Patrick Bonner; Lisa Hobby

== Aerobic gymnastics ==
Event	Gold	Silver	Bronze
Men's individual	Jonatan Cañada; Spain	Park Kwang-soo; South Korea	Grégory Alcan; France
Women's individual	Izabela Lăcătuș; Romania	Ludmila Kovatcheva; Bulgaria	Giovanna Lecis; Italy
Mixed pair	Russia; Vladislav Oksner; Tatiana Soloviova	France; Stéphane Brecard; Rachel Muller	Bulgaria; Marian Kolev; Galina Lazarova
Trio	France; Grégory Alcan; Xavier Julien; Olivier Salvan	Romania; Remus Nicolai; Claudiu Varlam; Cristian Moldovan	Bulgaria; Ludmila Kovatcheva; Galina Lazarova; Krassimira Dotzeva

== Artistic roller skating ==
Event	Gold	Silver	Bronze
Men's free skating	Luca Lailai; Italy	Joshua Rhodes; United States	Daniel Arriola; Argentina
Women's free skating	Heather Mulkey; United States	Erica Colaceci; Italy	Elke Dederichs; Germany
Pairs	Italy; Patrick Venerucci; Beatrice Palazzi Rossi	United States; Billy Crowder; Candice Heiden	Brazil; Max Santos; Luciana Roiha
Dance	United States; Adam White; Melissa Quinn	Australia; Gawaine Davis; Ester Ambrus	Argentina; Gastón Passini; Analia Martínez

== Bodybuilding ==
Event	Gold	Silver	Bronze
Men's 65 kg	Anwar El-Amawy; Egypt	José Carlos Santos; Brazil	Marvin Ward; United States
Men's 70 kg	Igor Kočiš; Slovakia	René Zimmermann; Switzerland	Derik Farnsworth; United States
Men's 75 kg	Andreas Becker; Germany	Yoshihiro Yano; Japan	Makoto Tashiro; Japan
Men's 80 kg	Pavlos Mentis; Greece	Juraj Vrábel; Slovakia	Tito Raymond; United States
Men's +80 kg	Olegas Žuras; Lithuania	Thomas Scheu; Germany	Manfred Petautschnig; Austria
Women's 52 kg	Pam Kusar; United States	Utako Mizuma; Japan	Sandra Weber; Germany
Women's +52 kg	Cornelia Junker; Germany	Susanne Niederhauser; Austria	Jana Purdjaková; Slovakia

== Boules sports ==
Event	Gold	Silver	Bronze
Men's lyonnaise progressive doubles	France; Laurent Duverger; Sébastien Grail	Italy; Michele Giordanino; Marco Ziraldo	Slovenia; Gregor Košir; Zoran Rednak
Men's pétanque triples	Italy; Stefano Bruno; Fabio Dutto; Paolo Lerda	Spain; José Luis Delgado; José Joaquín Romero; Antonio López	Belgium; André Lozano; Michel Van Campenhout; Claudy Weibel
Women's lyonnaise progressive doubles	France; Corine Maugiron; Valérie Maugiron	Italy; Ilenia Pasin; Laura Trova	Slovenia; Petra Pivk; Nina Sodec
Women's pétanque doubles	Belgium; Nancy Barzin; Linda Goblet	Spain; Rosario Inés; María Luisa Ruíz	Madagascar; Hanta Randriambahiny; Odile Razanamahefa

== Bowling ==
Event	Gold	Silver	Bronze
Men's singles	Tobias Gäbler; Germany	Kim Kyung-min; South Korea	Tom Hahl; Finland
Women's singles	Sofía Rodríguez; Guatemala	Ross Greiner; Netherlands	Piritta Kantola; Finland
Mixed doubles	Great Britain; Steve Thornton; Kirsten Penny	Germany; Tobias Gäbler; Tanya Petty	Norway; Petter Hansen; Mette Hansen

== Casting ==
Event	Gold	Silver	Bronze
Men's fly accuracy	Henrik Österberg; Sweden	Henrik Harjanne; Sweden	Jan Luxa; Czech Republic
Men's fly distance single handed	Jacek Kuza; Poland	Jan Luxa; Czech Republic	Henrik Österberg; Sweden
Men's multiplier accuracy	Michael Harter; Germany	Steve Rajeff; United States	Henrik Österberg; Sweden
Women's fly accuracy	Jana Maisel; Germany	Alena Zinner; Austria	Zuzana Kočířová; Czech Republic
Women's fly distance single handed	Kathrin Ernst; Germany	Tina Gerlach; Germany	Alena Zinner; Austria
Women's multiplier accuracy	Jana Maisel; Germany	Tina Gerlach; Germany	Kathrin Ernst; Germany

== Cue sports ==
Event	Gold	Silver	Bronze
Men's three-cushion carom	Dani Sánchez; Spain	Dick Jaspers; Netherlands	Lee Sang-chun; United States
Men's nine-ball pool	Yang Ching-shun; Chinese Taipei	Ralf Souquet; Germany	Thomas Engert; Germany
Men's snooker	Bjorn Haneveer; Belgium	Marlon Manalo; Philippines	Shokat Ali; Pakistan
Women's nine-ball pool	Jeanette Lee; United States	Karen Corr; Great Britain	Jennifer Chen; Chinese Taipei

== Dancesport ==
Event	Gold	Silver	Bronze
Standard	Great Britain; Jonathan Crossley; Kylie Jones	Italy; Mirko Gozzoli; Alessia Betti	Lithuania; Arūnas Bižokas; Edita Daniūtė
Latin	Slovenia; Andrej Škufca; Katarina Venturini	Russia; Dmitry Timokhin; Anna Bezikova	United States; Eugene Katsevman; Maria Manusova

== Field archery ==
Event	Gold	Silver	Bronze
Men's recurve	Jay Barrs; United States	Michele Frangilli; Italy	Fulvio Verdecchia; Italy
Men's compound	Dave Cousins; United States	Björn Andersson; Sweden	Hervé Dardant; France
Men's barebow	Erik Jonsson; Sweden	Žare Krajnc; Slovenia	Mattias Larsson; Sweden
Women's recurve	Carole Ferriou; France	Elisabeth Grube; Austria	Laure Barczynski; France
Women's compound	Michelle Ragsdale; United States	Giorgia Solato; Italy	Françoise Volle; France
Women's barebow	Barbara Guiducci; Italy	Patricia Lovell; Great Britain	Odile Boussière; France

== Finswimming ==
Event	Gold	Silver	Bronze
Men's 100 m surface	Evgeny Skorzhenko; Russia	Sergey Akhapov; Russia	Huang Jiandong; China
Men's 200 m surface	Sergey Akhapov; Russia	Andreas Utzmeir; Germany	Ilya Somov; Russia
Men's 400 m surface	Sven Gallasch; Germany	Gergely Juhos; Hungary	Ilya Somov; Russia
Men's 50 m apnoea	Evgeny Skorzhenko; Russia	Li Yong; China	Zhao Ji; China
Men's 4 × 100 m surface relay	Russia; Ilya Somov; Evgeny Skorzhenko; Maksim Maksimov; Sergey Akhapov	China; Zhao Ji; Hu Hailong; Huang Jiandong; Li Yong	Germany; Frank Wille; Sven Kaiser; Sven Gallasch; Andreas Utzmeir
Women's 100 m surface	Liu Qi; China	Tatiana Komarova; Russia	Zhu Baozhen; China
Women's 200 m surface	Anastassia Glukhikh; Russia	Lidia Goriacheva; Russia	Suzanne Jentzsch; Germany
Women's 400 m surface	Elena Gracheva; Russia	Anastassia Glukhikh; Russia	Bettina Müller; Germany
Women's 50 m apnoea	Anastassia Kochneva; Russia	Tatiana Komarova; Russia	Zhu Baozhen; China
Women's 4 × 100 m surface relay	Russia; Tatiana Komarova; Lidia Goriacheva; Irina Egoruchkina; Anastassia Kochneva	China; Zhu Baozhen; Li Qingping; Wu Xiaohui; Liu Qi	Germany; Suzanne Jentzsch; Tina Hirschfeldt; Bettina Müller; Christine Müller

== Fistball ==
Event	Gold	Silver	Bronze
Men	Austria; Herwig Stratjel; Andreas Woitsch; Martin Weiß; Christian Huber; Martin Seidl; Dietmar Weiß; Norbert Zauner; Stefan Einsiedler	Brazil; Andreas Treichel; Cristian Kohlmann; Fabiano Miranda; George Schuch; Iwerson Fernandes; Jorge Süffert; Jorge Eurico Gebhard; Leandro Fleck	Germany; Niels Pannewig; Martin Becker; Sven Varnhorn; Andreas Bernhardt; Simon Eggers; Jens Kolb; Christian Sondern; Frank Hertneck

== Flying disc ==
Event	Gold	Silver	Bronze
Men's disc golf	Barry Schultz; United States	Michael Sullivan; Canada	Jesper Lundmark; Sweden
Women's disc golf	Juliana Korver; United States	Niloofar Mosavar Rahmani; Sweden	Ruth Steele; Great Britain
Mixed ultimate	Canada; Allan Nichols; Anja Haman; Jeff Cruickshank; Jill Calkin; Kirk Savage; Leslie Calder; Marc Seraglia; Mike Grant; Su-Ning Strube; Victoria Chow	United States; Billy Rodriguez; Christine Dunlap; Damien Scott; Dana Green; Dominique Fontenette; Heidi Pomfret; Justin Safdie; Steve Dugan; Johanna Neumann; Fortunat Mueller	Japan; Ayuko Sonoda; Fuminori Ishizuka; Hiroko Misui; Kaori Nasu; Kimiyo Yano; Makiko Iida; Masato Okada; Yasushi Yamamoto; Yohei Kichikawa; Yoshinori Nasu

== Inline speed skating ==
Event	Gold	Silver	Bronze
Men's 300 m time trial	Gregorio Duggento; Italy	Kalon Dobbin; New Zealand	Chad Hedrick; United States
Men's 500 m sprint	Chad Hedrick; United States	Miguel Rueda; Colombia	Gregorio Duggento; Italy
Men's 10000 m points	Chad Hedrick; United States	Shane Dobbin; New Zealand	Jorge Botero; Colombia
Men's 15000 m points elimination	Chad Hedrick; United States	Diego Rosero; Colombia	Jorge Botero; Colombia
Men's 20000 m elimination	Kalon Dobbin; New Zealand	Jorge Botero; Colombia	Christoph Zschätzsch; Germany
Women's 300 m time trial	Pan Li-ling; Chinese Taipei	Valentina Belloni; Italy	Pan Yi-chin; Chinese Taipei
Women's 500 m sprint	Pan Li-ling; Chinese Taipei	Pan Yi-chin; Chinese Taipei	Berenice Moreno; Colombia
Women's 5000 m points	Silvia Niño; Colombia	Alexandra Vivas; Colombia	Berenice Moreno; Colombia
Women's 10000 m points elimination	Alexandra Vivas; Colombia	Pan Yi-chin; Chinese Taipei	Silvia Niño; Colombia
Women's 15000 m elimination	Berenice Moreno; Colombia	Silvia Niño; Colombia	Pan Yi-chin; Chinese Taipei

== Ju-jitsu ==
Event	Gold	Silver	Bronze
Men's duo	France; Bruno Pereira; Jérôme Laurent	Germany; Andreas Richter; Raik Tietze	Belgium; Tom Jacobs; Wim Kersemans
Men's fighting 69 kg	Antonio Da Costa; France	Gerhard Ableidinger; Austria	Colin Kist; Netherlands
Men's fighting 77 kg	Didier Cezar; France	Michel van Rijt; Netherlands	Christer Öqvist; Sweden
Men's fighting 85 kg	Rob Haans; Netherlands	Thierry Grimaud; France	Peter Bevc; Slovenia
Men's fighting 94 kg	Kamal Temal; France	Pedro García; Spain	Grzegorz Zimoląg; Poland
Women's duo	Denmark; Vibeke Mortensen; Karina Lauridsen	France; Läetitia Deloris; Géraldine Dejardin	Netherlands; Silvia Alvarez; Nuray Batman
Women's fighting 62 kg	Patricia Hekkens; Netherlands	Jeanne Rasmussen; Denmark	Diana Gasco; Spain
Women's fighting 70 kg	Nicole Sydbøge; Denmark	Sophie Albert; France	Anna Dimberg; Sweden
Mixed duo	Spain; Miguel Ángel Benítez; Isabel Talavera	Germany; Peter Florian; Gertraud Christ	Denmark; Frank Stjernholm; Camilla Prien

== Karate ==
Event	Gold	Silver	Bronze
Men's kata	Ryoki Abe; Japan	Luca Valdesi; Italy	Antonio Díaz; Venezuela
Men's kumite 60 kg	Kenichi Imai; Japan	Francesco Ortu; Italy	Milo Hodge; Great Britain
Men's kumite 65 kg	Jason Ledgister; Great Britain	Jean Carlos Peña; Venezuela	Yusuke Inokoshi; Japan
Men's kumite 70 kg	Yasuhisa Inada; Japan	Yoshinori Matsumoto; Japan	Hussein El-Desouky; Egypt
Men's kumite 75 kg	Gennaro Talarico; Italy	Takahiro Niki; Japan	Adnan Hadžić; Bosnia and Herzegovina
Men's kumite 80 kg	Salvatore Loria; Italy	Billy Finegan; United States	Ryosuke Shimizu; Japan
Men's kumite +80 kg	Seydina Baldé; France	Stefano Maniscalco; Italy	Leon Walters; Great Britain
Men's kumite openweight	David Félix; France	Konstantinos Papadopoulos; Greece	Craig Burke; Great Britain
Women's kata	Atsuko Wakai; Japan	Yohana Sánchez; Venezuela	Junko Arai; United States
Women's kumite 53 kg	Sachiko Miyamoto; Japan	Eri Fujioka; Japan	Sari Laine; Finland
Women's kumite 60 kg	Karin Prinsloo; South Africa	Kellie Shimmings; Australia	Roksanda Lazarević; FR Yugoslavia
Women's kumite +60 kg	Emiko Honma; Japan	Tessy Scholtes; Luxembourg	Tania Weekes; Great Britain

== Korfball ==
Event	Gold	Silver	Bronze
Mixed	Netherlands; Daniël Hulzebosch; Daniela Riet; Dennis Voshart; Erik Simons; Heleen van der Wilt; Helmi Langenhorst; Jiska Brandt; Kees Vlietstra; Kees Slingerland; Leon Simons; Mandy Loorij; Marian de Jong; Ronald van der Bunt; Tim Abbenhuis	Belgium; Andy Gilles; Ann Huybrechts; Cindy Van Autreve; Dave Cools; Debby Everaert; Detlef Elewaut; Gert Degenaers; Joyce Van Gorp; Kris Embrecht; Nancy Baele; Ronny Lenjou; Sofie Van den Ende; Steve De Jonghe; Sven Hardies	Chinese Taipei; Huang Chen-yi; Tang Chia-yi; Li Chien-chih; Chen Chien-ting; Feng Chun-cheng; Chou Hsiang-ju; Hung Hsiu-ting; Huang Kun-cheng; Han Kuo-chin; Chen Mei-ju; Chang Sheng-chieh; Lin Shih-chieh; Chung Shu-fen; Tsao Wan-ju

== Lifesaving ==
Event	Gold	Silver	Bronze
Men's 200 m obstacle	Roel Jansen; Belgium	Stephen Short; Australia	Germano Proietti; Italy
Men's 50 m manikin carry	Pablo Terradillos; Spain	Jason O'Pray; Australia	Stephen Short; Australia
Men's 100 m manikin carry fins	Jason O'Pray; Australia	Maik Hofmann; Germany	Matt Bouman; South Africa
Men's 100 m rescue medley	Lutz Heimann; Germany	Jason O'Pray; Australia	Stephen Short; Australia
Men's surf race	Zane Holmes; Australia	Matt Bouman; South Africa	Germano Proietti; Italy
Men's board race	Zane Holmes; Australia	Ryan Butcher; South Africa	Matt Bouman; South Africa
Men's beach flags	Sergio González; Spain	Waleed Damon; South Africa	Hidenobu Tadano; Japan
Men's team overall	South Africa; Matt Bouman; Ryan Butcher; Waleed Damon; Gary Kurth; Graeme Willcox	Australia; Zane Holmes; Ky Hurst; Jason O'Pray; Stephen Short; Luke Turner	Germany; Lutz Heimann; Maik Hofmann; Thorsten Laurent; Matthias Löwenberg; Carsten Schlepphorst
Women's 200 m obstacle	Kate Krywulycz; Australia	Bieke Vandenabeele; Belgium	Stacey Bowley; South Africa
Women's 50 m manikin carry	Leigh Habler; Australia	Aurélie Goffin; Belgium	Isabella Cerquozzi; Italy
Women's 100 m manikin carry fins	Paola Zago; Italy	Marcella Prandi; Italy	Alexandra Berlin; Germany
Women's 100 m rescue medley	Leigh Habler; Australia	Jana Pescheck; Germany	Aurélie Goffin; Belgium
Women's surf race	Karla Gilbert; Australia	Candice Crafford; South Africa	Kate Krywulycz; Australia
Women's board race	Karla Gilbert; Australia	Gabby Moses; Australia	Jenna Worlock; South Africa
Women's beach flags	Masami Yusa; Japan	Rosa González; Spain	Kozue Fujiwara; Japan
Women's team overall	Australia; Karla Gilbert; Leigh Habler; Kate Krywulycz; Kate McLellan; Gabby Moses	South Africa; Bronwyn Baumgart; Stacey Bowley; Candice Crafford; Tracey Martheze; Jenna Worlock	Germany; Alexandra Berlin; Steffy Eckers; Julia Hübner; Jana Pescheck; Daniela Schmutzer

== Orienteering ==
Event	Gold	Silver	Bronze
Men's middle distance	Grant Bluett; Australia	Tore Sandvik; Norway	Jamie Stevenson; Great Britain
Women's middle distance	Hanne Staff; Norway	Anette Granstedt; Sweden	Birgitte Husebye; Norway
Mixed relay	Norway; Bjørnar Valstad; Hanne Staff; Tore Sandvik; Birgitte Husebye	Lithuania; Svajūnas Ambrazas; Vilma Rudzenskaitė; Edgaras Voveris; Giedrė Voverienė	Sweden; Emil Wingstedt; Anette Granstedt; Niclas Jonasson; Jenny Johansson

== Parachuting ==
Event	Gold	Silver	Bronze
Men's freestyle skydiving	United States; Olav Zipser; Matt Nelson	France; Nicolas Arnaud; Stéphane Fardel	United States; Omar Alhegelan; Greg Gasson
Women's freestyle skydiving	Italy; Stefania Martinengo; Filippo Fabbi	Japan; Yoko Okazaki; Axel Zohmann	Italy; Gigliola Borgnis; Marco Tiezzi
Open accuracy landing	Marco Pflüger; Germany	Wang Jianming; China	Wei Ning; China
Open formation skydiving	United States; John Eagle; Craig Girard; Neal Houston; Mark Kirkby; Marc Steinbaugh	Norway; Lise Aune; Dag Einar Hernes; Pål Kolbenstvedt; Carl-Erik Tuv; Torstein Valen	France; Jérôme David; Marin Ferré; Julien Losantos; Davidé Moy; Laurent Pechberty

== Powerlifting ==
Event	Gold	Silver	Bronze
Men's lightweight	Alexey Sivokon; Kazakhstan	Konstantin Pavlov; Russia	Mikhail Andryukhin; Russia
Men's middleweight	Viktor Furazhkin; Russia	Andrey Tarasenko; Russia	Sergey Mor; Russia
Men's heavyweight	Daisuke Midote; Japan	Brad Gillingham; United States	Jörgen Ljungberg; Sweden
Women's lightweight	Raija Koskinen; Finland	Chen Kuan-ting; Chinese Taipei	Yukako Fukushima; Japan
Women's middleweight	Marina Kudinova; Russia	Irina Abramova; Russia	Pirjo Savola; Finland
Women's heavyweight	Svetlana Miklashevich; Russia	Natalia Payusova; Russia	Chao Chen-yeh; Chinese Taipei

== Rhythmic gymnastics ==
Event	Gold	Silver	Bronze
Women's rope	Irina Tchachina; Russia	Lyasan Utiasheva; Russia	Elena Tkachenko; Belarus
Women's hoop	Irina Tchachina; Russia	Lyasan Utiasheva; Russia	Elena Tkachenko; Belarus
Women's ball	Irina Tchachina; Russia	Lyasan Utiasheva; Russia	Elena Tkachenko; Belarus
Women's clubs	Irina Tchachina; Russia	Lyasan Utiasheva; Russia	Elena Tkachenko; Belarus

== Roller hockey ==
Event	Gold	Silver	Bronze
Men	Portugal; Paulo Matos; Filipe Santos; Ricardo Pereira; Paulo Almeida; António Neves; Reinaldo Ventura; Sérgio Silva; Pedro Alves; Filipe Gaidão; João Miguel	Brazil; Marcus Almeida; Fernando Louzada; Leandro Wada; Leonardo Agra; Luiz Wanderley; Leonardo Borges; André Borges; Graco Pires; Manuel Fernandes; Paulo Lins	Germany; Mark Berenback; Martin Schmahl; Michael Koch; Andreas Druzovic; Martin Hibbeln; Björn Achtig; Jan Velte; Martin Herrmann

== Rugby sevens ==
Event	Gold	Silver	Bronze
Men	Fiji; Jope Tuikabe; Alifereti Doviverata; Viliame Satala; Sisa Koyamaibole; Fero Lasagavibau; Waisale Serevi; Isoa Domolailai; Vilimoni Delasau; Neori Senivau; Norman Ligairi	Australia; John Roe; David Croft; Scott Barton; Richard Graham; Robert McDonald; Tui Talaia; Michael Tabrett; Julian Huxley; Patrick Phibbs; Patrick Howard	New Zealand; Scott Waldrom; Ross Martin; Craig De Goldi; Chris Smylie; Gideon Viliamu; Tusi Pisi; Mana Ashford; Sione Kepu; Stu McDonald; Donovan Nepia

== Trampoline gymnastics ==
Event	Gold	Silver	Bronze
Men's synchro	Russia; Alexander Moskalenko; German Khnychev	Belarus; Mikalai Kazak; Vladimir Kakorka	Japan; Takayuki Kawanishi; Daisuke Nakata
Men's double mini	Radostin Rachev; Bulgaria	Diogo Faria; Portugal	Uwe Marquardt; Germany
Men's tumbling	Levon Petrosian; Russia	Tseko Mogotsi; South Africa	Rob Small; Great Britain
Women's synchro	Ukraine; Oxana Tsyhuleva; Olena Movchan	Great Britain; Kirsten Lawton; Claire Wright	Russia; Irina Karavayeva; Natalia Chernova
Women's double mini	Teodora Sinilkova; Bulgaria	Jacinta Harford; Australia	Ilse Despriet; Belgium
Women's tumbling	Elena Bluyina; Russia	Kathryn Peberdy; Great Britain	Anna Terenya; Belarus

== Tug of war ==
Event	Gold	Silver	Bronze
Men's indoor 600 kg	Great Britain (England); Neil Alcock; Shaun Alcock; Ian Daniels; Carl Davies; David Field; Tony Hadley; Jonathan Jones; Duane Meadowcroft; Phil Paddock; Kirk Scott; Robert Steele	Great Britain (Scotland); Alan Brodie; Larry Dunlop; Stephen Garner; Gary Gillespie; Graeme Hendry; Neil MacFarlane; Thomas Nelson; Robert Patterson; Gordon Sang; Robert Warnock; Tom Weir	Japan; Takashi Chiwaki; Yutaka Ishiyama; Mitsuru Kobayashi; Hideaki Morozumi; Akihiko Nakamura; Masahiro Osada; Tatsuo Saito; Humiaki Sato; Osamu Suzuki; Yoshihiro Takeuchi; Yoshika Yamaki
Men's outdoor 680 kg	Netherlands; Ivo Brugman; Jan Groot Wassink; Gerben Jansen; Henk Lammers; Erwin Leusink; Marcel Leusink; Wim Mateman; Peter Naalden; Erik Scharenborg; Arnold Veltkamp	Switzerland; Walter Bernhard; Daniel Christen; Peter Christen; Ueli Christen; Patrick Emmenegger; Albert Klager; Fabian Langenstein; Simon Langenstein; Peter Lenherr; Ernst Rutten; Jost Waser	Sweden; Roger Andersson; Johannes Bodi; Fredrik Järviö; Jim Johansson; Kristoffer Johansson; Tom Johansson; Mikael Karlsson; Jesper Persson; Björn Törnblom

== Water skiing ==
Event	Gold	Silver	Bronze
Men's ski overall	Patrice Martin; France	Jason Seels; Great Britain	Tom Asher; Great Britain
Men's barefoot overall	Keith St. Onge; United States	David Small; Great Britain	Evert Aartsen; Netherlands
Men's wakeboarding	Rodo Vinh-Tung; France	Morgan Krause; South Africa	Fabrizio Benelli; Italy
Women's ski overall	Elena Milakova; Russia	Angeliki Andriopoulou; Greece	Sarah Gatty Saunt; Great Britain
Women's barefoot overall	Nadine de Villiers; South Africa	Rachel George; United States	Kirsten Grønvik; Norway
Women's wakeboarding	Mero Narita; Japan	Leza Bugden; Australia	Kiyomi Suzuki; Japan

== Invitational sports ==
=== Beach handball ===
Event	Gold	Silver	Bronze
Men	Belarus	Spain	Brazil
Women	Ukraine	Germany	Brazil

=== Gateball ===
Event	Gold	Silver	Bronze
Mixed	Japan; Hirofumi Fujiwara; Satoshi Fujiwara; Wataru Fujiwara; Kiyohiro Katsuoka; Yasumasa Moriwaki; Akihiro Onishi	Chinese Taipei; Chang Kuo-pao; Chang Wei-pin; Hsu Chiu-chuan; Lai Kuo Ying-hua; Lee Pen-fong; Lee Pen-kan; Lin Ting-chang; Wang Ching-tai	China; Chen Honggang; Gong Luping; Li Jiaohuai; Li Jingjian; Zhang Wei; Zheng Farong; Zhou Zheng

=== Sumo ===
Event	Gold	Silver	Bronze
Men's 85 kg	Chohei Kimura; Japan	Peer Schmidt-Düwiger; Germany	Lodoijamtsyn Bat-Erdene; Mongolia
Men's 115 kg	Seietsu Hikage; Japan	Altangadasyn Khüchitbaatar; Mongolia	David Tsallagov; Russia
Men's +115 kg	Jörg Brümmer; Germany	Jüri Uustalu; Estonia	Takahisa Osanai; Japan
Men's openweight	Kenichi Yajima; Japan	Torsten Scheibler; Germany	Jaroslav Poříz; Czech Republic
Men's team	Japan	Germany	Russia
Women's 65 kg	Astrid Lixenfeld; Germany	Satomi Ishigaya; Japan	Natalia Bobkina; Russia
Women's +65 kg	Olesya Kovalenko; Russia	Rie Tsuihiji; Japan	Sandra Köppen; Germany
Women's team	Russia	Estonia	Japan

=== Tug of war ===
Event	Gold	Silver	Bronze
Women's indoor 480 kg	Spain	Japan	Netherlands
Women's indoor 520 kg	Netherlands	Japan	United States
