= Orienteering at the 2001 World Games =

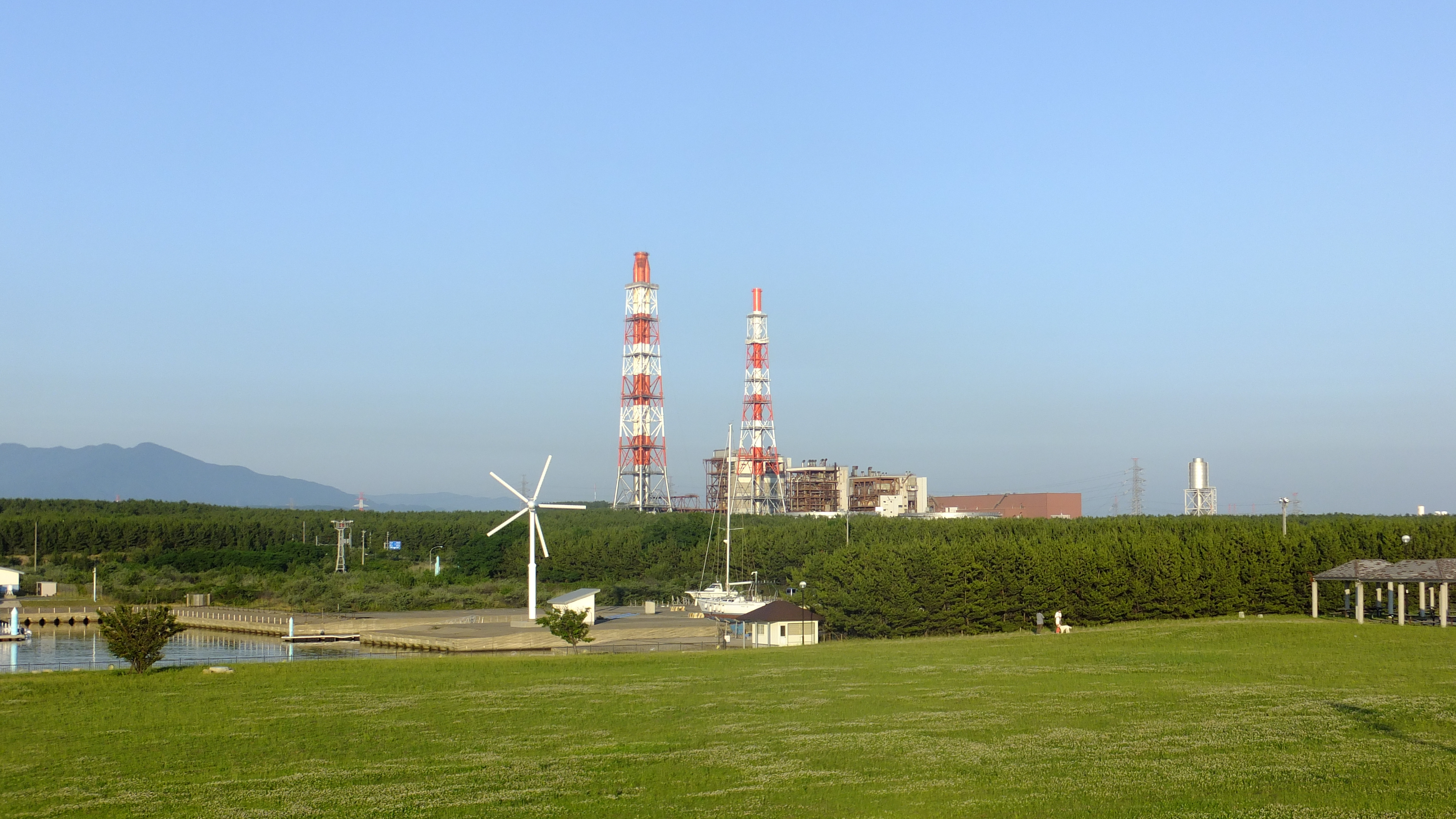
- Iijima Forest and Akita Thermal Power Station
- Venue: Iijima Forest
- Dates: 18–19 August 2001
- Competitors: 76 from 11 nations

The orienteering events at the 2001 World Games in Akita was played between 18 and 19 August. 76 orienteers, from 11 nations, participated in the tournament. The orienteering competition took place in Iijima Forest.

== Participating nations ==
- Australia (4)
- Czech Republic (4)
- Denmark (5)
- Estonia (4)
- Finland (8)
- France (4)
- Germany (4)
- Great Britain (4)
- Hungary (1)
- Japan (4)
- Lithuania (4)
- Norway (6)
- Poland (4)
- Russia (4)
- Slovakia (2)
- Spain (1)
- Sweden (6)
- Switzerland (5)
- Ukraine (2)

== Medal table ==
Rank	Nation	Gold	Silver	Bronze	Total
1	Norway	2	1	1	4
2	Australia	1	0	0	1
3	Sweden	0	1	1	2
4	Lithuania	0	1	0	1
5	Great Britain	0	0	1	1
Totals (5 entries)		3	3	3	9

== Events ==
Event	Gold	Silver	Bronze
Men's individual	Australia; Grant Bluett	Norway; Tore Sandvik	Great Britain; Jamie Stevenson
Women's individual	Norway; Hanne Staff	Sweden; Anette Granstedt	Norway; Birgitte Husebye
Mixed relay	Norway; Bjørnar Valstad; Hanne Staff; Tore Sandvik; Birgitte Husebye	Lithuania; Svajūnas Ambrazas; Vilma Rudzenskaitė; Edgaras Voveris; Giedrė Voverienė	Sweden; Emil Wingstedt; Anette Granstedt; Niclas Jonasson; Jenny Johansson
