= Orienteering at the 2001 World Games – Women's individual =

Orienteering women's individual at the 2001 World Games
- Venue: Iijima Forest, Akita, Japan
- Date: 18 August 2001
- Competitors: 38 from 18 nations

Medalists
gold medal	(Norway) Hanne Staff
silver medal	(Sweden) Anette Granstedt
bronze medal	(Norway) Birgitte Husebye

The women's individual competition in orienteering at the 2001 World Games took place on 18 August 2001 in the Iijima Forest in Akita, Japan.

== Competition format ==
A total of 38 athletes entered the competition. Every athlete had to check in at control points, which were located across the course.

== Results ==
Rank	Athlete	Nation	Time
1st place, gold medalist(s)	Hanne Staff	Norway	33:38.3
2nd place, silver medalist(s)	Anette Granstedt	Sweden	34:07.8
3rd place, bronze medalist(s)	Birgitte Husebye	Norway	34:20.9
4	Giedrė Voverienė	Lithuania	35:34.2
5	Simone Luder	Switzerland	36:17.6
6	Katalin Oláh	Hungary	36:20.3
7	Elisabeth Ingvaldsen	Norway	37:18.3
8	Jenny James	(United Kingdom) Great Britain	38:16.0
9	Vilma Rudzenskaitė	Lithuania	38:33.6
10	Reeta-Mari Kolkkala	Finland	39:28.3
11	Jenny Johansson	Sweden	39:54.9
12	Johanna Asklöf	Finland	40:09.4
13	Joanne Allison	Australia	40:18.3
14	Nina Vinnytska	Ukraine	40:35.1
15	Brigitte Wolf	Switzerland	40:53.0
16	Elo Saue	Estonia	41:21.9
17	Anna Górnicka-Antonowicz	Poland	41:36.8
18	Nataliya Potopalska	Ukraine	41:41.1
19	Heather Monro	(United Kingdom) Great Britain	42:11.9
20	Bohdana Terova	Czech Republic	42:32.4
21	Anna Folkegard Garin	Spain	43:07.5
22	Zdenka Stará	Czech Republic	43:21.1
23	Laure Coupat	France	43:21.5
24	Helene Hausner	Denmark	45:17.0
25	Katarina Allberg	Sweden	45:46.8
26	Misa Shioda	Japan	45:49.9
27	Elena Voronina	Russia	46:21.8
28	Kirsi Boström	Finland	48:06.1
29	Barbara Bączek	Poland	48:43.7
30	Natasha Key	Australia	48:59.5
31	Liisa Anttila	Finland	50:54.8
32	Anne Konring Olesen	Denmark	51:06.1
33	Anu Annus	Estonia	52:08.4
34	Maia Tcernouchka	Russia	55:28.6
35	Silke Schlittermann	Germany	57:00.2
36	Yuka Kinnami	Japan	58:52.1
	Juliette Soulard	France	DSQ
	Luise Karger	Germany	DSQ
