= Orienteering at the 2001 World Games – Men's individual =

Orienteering men's individual at the 2001 World Games
- Venue: Iijima Forest, Akita, Japan
- Date: 18 August 2001
- Competitors: 38 from 16 nations

Medalists
| gold medal | (Australia) Grant Bluett |
| silver medal | (Norway) Tore Sandvik |
| bronze medal | (United Kingdom) Jamie Stevenson |

The men's individual competition in orienteering at the 2001 World Games took place on 18 August 2001 in the Iijima Forest in Akita, Japan.

== Competition format ==
A total of 38 athletes entered the competition. Every athlete had to check in at control points, which were located across the course.

== Results ==
| Rank | Athlete | Nation | Time |
|---|---|---|---|
| 1st place, gold medalist(s) | Grant Bluett | Australia | 31:00.4 |
| 2nd place, silver medalist(s) | Tore Sandvik | Norway | 31:38.3 |
| 3rd place, bronze medalist(s) | Jamie Stevenson | (United Kingdom) Great Britain | 31:42.9 |
| 4 | Niclas Jonasson | Sweden | 31:49.7 |
| 5 | Pavel Naumov | Russia | 33:17.7 |
| 6 | Carsten Jørgensen | Denmark | 33:36.4 |
| 7 | Emil Wingstedt | Sweden | 33:41.9 |
| 8 | Jarkko Huovila | Finland | 33:43.4 |
| 9 | Vladimír Lučan | Czech Republic | 33:58.8 |
| 10 | Juha Peltola | Finland | 34:11.3 |
| 11 | Edgaras Voveris | Lithuania | 34:31.8 |
| 12 | Mats Haldin | Finland | 35:19.8 |
| 13 | Janusz Porzycz | Poland | 35:52.0 |
| 14 | Robert Banach | Poland | 35:57.7 |
| 15 | Matthias Niggli | Switzerland | 36:26.2 |
| 16 | Evgeny Gavrilov | Russia | 36:33.8 |
| 17 | Carl Henrik Bjørseth | Norway | 37:06.9 |
| 18 | Olle Kärner | Estonia | 37:08.1 |
| 19 | Robert Walter | Australia | 37:44.0 |
| 20 | Michal Jedlička | Czech Republic | 37:48.1 |
| 21 | Damien Renard | France | 37:50.2 |
| 22 | Mats Troeng | Sweden | 37:51.4 |
| 23 | Toshiyuki Matsuzawa | Japan | 37:57.0 |
| 24 | Matthias Gilgien | Switzerland | 37:57.5 |
| 25 | Donatus Schnyder | Switzerland | 38:01.6 |
| 26 | Ingo Horst | Germany | 38:44.1 |
| 27 | František Libant | Slovakia | 38:55.3 |
| 28 | Mikael Boström | Finland | 39:07.1 |
| 29 | Michael Thierolf | Germany | 39:42.7 |
| 30 | Marián Dávidík | Slovakia | 39:54.0 |
| 31 | Stephen Palmer | (United Kingdom) Great Britain | 41:12.4 |
| 32 | Allan Mogensen | Denmark | 41:31.7 |
| 33 | François Gonon | France | 42:38.7 |
| 34 | Bjørnar Valstad | Norway | 43:23.0 |
| 35 | Hirobumi Kagaya | Japan | 43:44.2 |
| | Morten Fenger-Grøn | Denmark | DSQ |
| | Erik Aibast | Estonia | DSQ |
| | Svajūnas Ambrazas | Lithuania | DSQ |
