= Orienteering at the 2005 World Games =

- Venue: Jahnstadion
- Dates: 18–19 August 2001
- Competitors: 78 from 18 nations

The orienteering events at the 2005 World Games in Duisburg was played between 18 and 19 August. 78 orienteers, from 18 nations, participated in the tournament. The orienteering competition took place at Jahnstadion in Bottrop.

== Participating nations ==
- Australia (4)
- Czech Republic (5)
- Denmark (5)
- Estonia (2)
- Finland (6)
- France (6)
- Germany (5)
- Great Britain (5)
- Latvia (5)
- Lithuania (6)
- Norway (6)
- Poland (1)
- Romania (1)
- Russia (6)
- Slovakia (1)
- Sweden (6)
- Switzerland (7)
- Ukraine (1)

== Medal table ==
Rank	Nation	Gold	Silver	Bronze	Total
1	Switzerland	2	1	0	3
2	France	1	0	0	1
3	Germany	0	1	0	1
3	Russia	0	1	0	1
5	Czech Republic	0	0	1	1
5	Great Britain	0	0	1	1
5	Norway	0	0	1	1
Totals (7 entries)		3	3	3	9

== Events ==
Event	Gold	Silver	Bronze
Men's middle distance	Thierry Gueorgiou; France	Daniel Hubmann; Switzerland	Øystein Kvaal Østerbø; Norway
Women's middle distance	Simone Niggli-Luder; Switzerland	Karin Schmalfeld; Germany	Heather Monro; Great Britain
Mixed relay	Switzerland; Matthias Merz; Lea Müller; Daniel Hubmann; Simone Niggli-Luder	Russia; Sergey Detkov; Aliya Sitdikova; Maxim Davydov; Tatiana Ryabkina	Czech Republic; Petr Losman; Marta Štěrbová; Tomáš Dlabaja; Dana Brožková
