= Orienteering at the 2001 World Games – Mixed relay =

Orienteering mixed relay at the 2001 World Games
- Venue: Iijima Forest
- Date: 19 August 2001
- Competitors: 60 from 15 nations

Medalists
1st place, gold medalist(s)		Bjørnar Valstad; Hanne Staff; Tore Sandvik; Birgitte Husebye	Norway
2nd place, silver medalist(s)		Svajūnas Ambrazas; Vilma Rudzenskaitė; Edgaras Voveris; Giedrė Voverienė	Lithuania
3rd place, bronze medalist(s)		Emil Wingstedt; Anette Granstedt; Niclas Jonasson; Jenny Johansson	Sweden

The mixed relay competition in orienteering at the 2001 World Games was held on August 19, 2001, Iijima Forest, Akita, Japan.

== Competition format ==
15 teams, each consisting of four athletes, participated in the competition. Each athlete was required to check in at control points distributed throughout the course.

== Results ==
Rank	Team	Time	Deficit
1st place, gold medalist(s)	(Norway) Norway; Bjørnar Valstad; Hanne Staff; Tore Sandvik; Birgitte Husebye	1:36:34; 23:27.4; 23:50.4; 23:59.9; 25:16.9	–
2nd place, silver medalist(s)	(Lithuania) Lithuania; Svajūnas Ambrazas; Vilma Rudzenskaitė; Edgaras Voveris; Giedrė Voverienė	1:37:00; 23:10.6; 24:09.7; 24:03.8; 25:36.7	+0:26
3rd place, bronze medalist(s)	(Sweden) Sweden; Emil Wingstedt; Anette Granstedt; Niclas Jonasson; Jenny Johansson	1:38:07; 23:25.3; 27:59.2; 24:02.6; 22:40.3	+1:33
4	(Poland) Poland; Janusz Porzycz; Anna Górnicka-Antonowicz; Robert Banach; Barbara Bączek	1:38:11; 23:33.3; 23:45.4; 24:02.8; 26:49.7	+1:37
5	(Australia) Australia; Robert Walter; Joanne Allison; Grant Bluett; Natasha Key	1:38:22; 23:45.1; 25:32.7; 25:16.3; 23:48.2	+1:48
6	(United Kingdom) Great Britain; Stephen Palmer; Jenny James; Jamie Stevenson; Heather Monro	1:39:40; 23:53.0; 27:03.7; 24:34.2; 24:09.3	+3:06
7	(Switzerland) Switzerland; Matthias Niggli; Brigitte Wolf; Matthias Gilgien; Simone Luder	1:42:40; 23:44.8; 28:23.7; 26:25.0; 24:07.2	+6:06
8	(Finland) Finland; Juha Peltola; Johanna Asklöf; Jarkko Huovila; Reeta-Mari Kolkkala	1:42:55; 23:51.2; 24:58.3; 29:55.7; 24:10.3	+6:21
9	(France) France; François Gonon; Laure Coupat; Damien Renard; Juliette Soulard	1:47:11; 23:32.3; 30:39.7; 25:59.5; 27:00.4	+10:37
10	(Germany) Germany; Ingo Horst; Luise Karger; Michael Thierolf; Silke Schlittermann	1:48:40; 23:28.0; 30:51.9; 26:10.0; 28:10.6	+12:06
11	(Estonia) Estonia; Erik Aibast; Anu Annus; Olle Kärner; Elo Saue	1:48:52; 24:47.0; 29:13.5; 27:12.5; 27:39.6	+12:18
12	(Czech Republic) Czech Republic; Vladimír Lučan; Bohdana Terova; Michal Jedlička; Zdenka Stará	1:49:02; 27:07.2; 29:02.9; 27:00.3; 25:52.3	+12:28
13	(Russia) Russia; Pavel Naumov; Elena Voronina; Evgeny Gavrilov; Maia Tcernouchka	1:52:47; 23:26.9; 30:34.6; 27:08.4; 31:37.3	+16:13
14	(Denmark) Denmark; Morten Fenger-Grøn; Helene Hausner; Carsten Jørgensen; Anne Konring Olesen	1:57:02; 26:50.3; 31:11.4; 22:56.1; 36:04.3	+20:28
15	(Japan) Japan; Hirobumi Kagaya; Yuka Kinnami; Toshiyuki Matsuzawa; Misa Shioda	2:22:15; 29:40.0; 40:02.5; 32:34.1; 39:59.0	+45:41
