= List of Lithuanian sportspeople =

Lithuanian sportspeople are Lithuanian athletes who have attained outstanding achievements in sports. The criteria for inclusion in this list are:

- 1–3 places winners at major international tournaments;
- for team sports, winning in preliminary competitions of finals at major international tournaments, or playing for several seasons for clubs of major national leagues; or
- holders of past and current world records.

== Athletes ==
=== American football ===
- Arunas Vasys

=== Athletics (Track and Field) ===
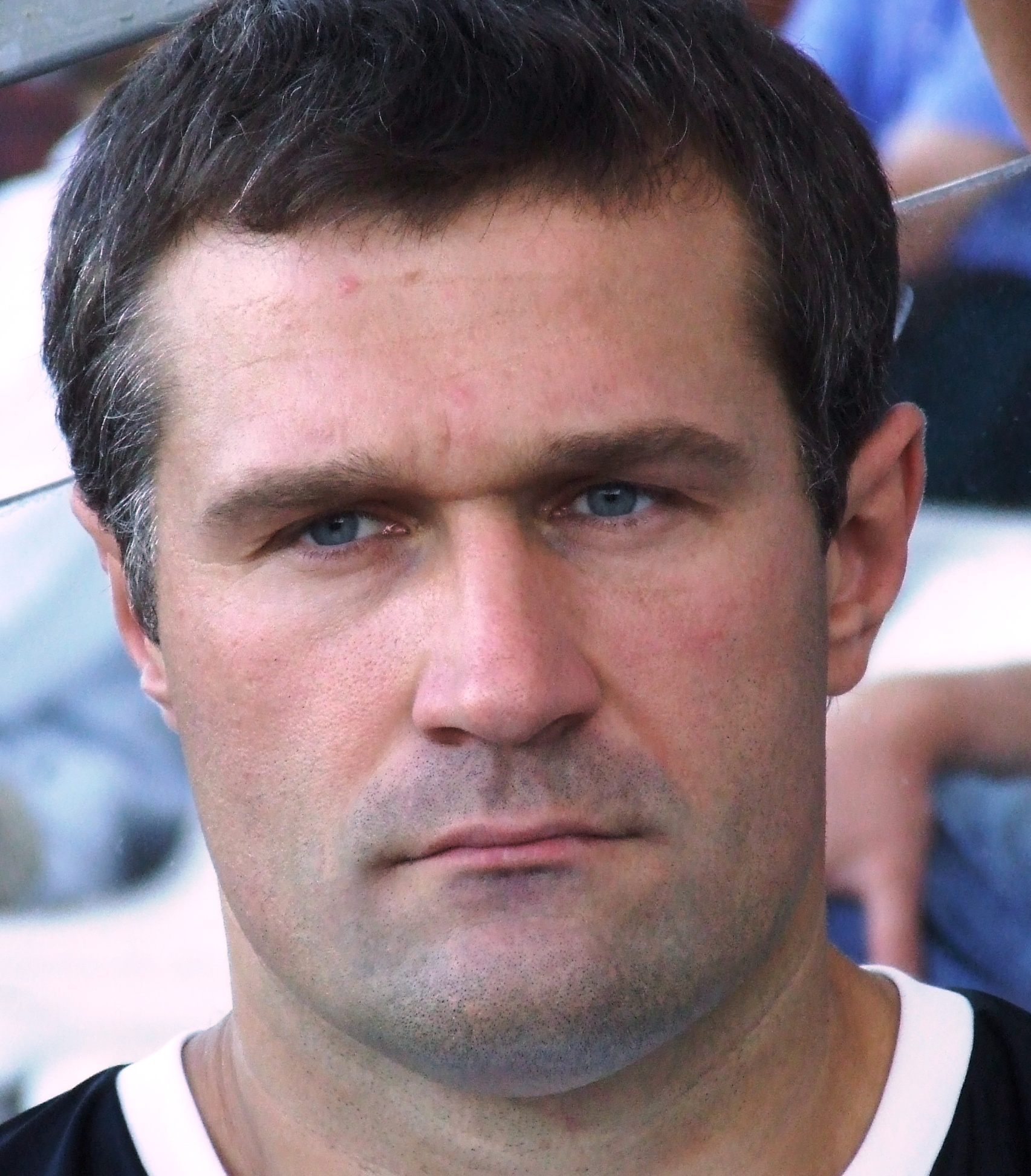
Virgilijus Alekna

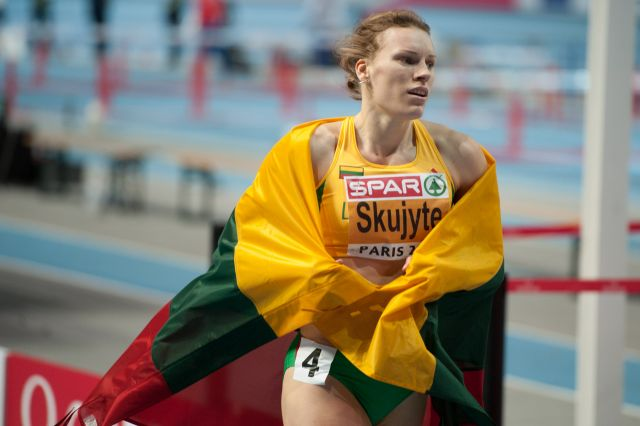
Austra Skujytė

- Virgilijus Alekna
- Mykolas Alekna
- Andrius Gudžius
- Gabija Galvydytė
- Ana Ambrazienė
- Laimutė Baikauskaitė
- Eglė Balčiūnaitė
- Živilė Balčiūnaitė
- Vilma Bardauskienė
- Darius Draudvila
- Lina Grinčikaitė
- Martynas Jurgilas
- Saulius Kleiza
- Irina Krakoviak
- Rišardas Malachovskis
- Antanas Mikėnas
- Galina Murašova
- Remigija Nazarovienė
- Airinė Palšytė
- Rita Ramanauskaitė
- Nijolė Sabaitė
- Rytis Sakalauskas
- Kristina Saltanovič
- Zinaida Sendriūtė
- Austra Skujytė
- Kęstutis Šapka
- Donatas Škarnulis
- Tadas Šuškevičius
- Sonata Tamošaitytė
- Romas Ubartas
- Remigijus Valiulis
- Nelė Žilinskienė
- Viktorija Žemaitytė
- Andrius Gudžius

=== Basketball ===
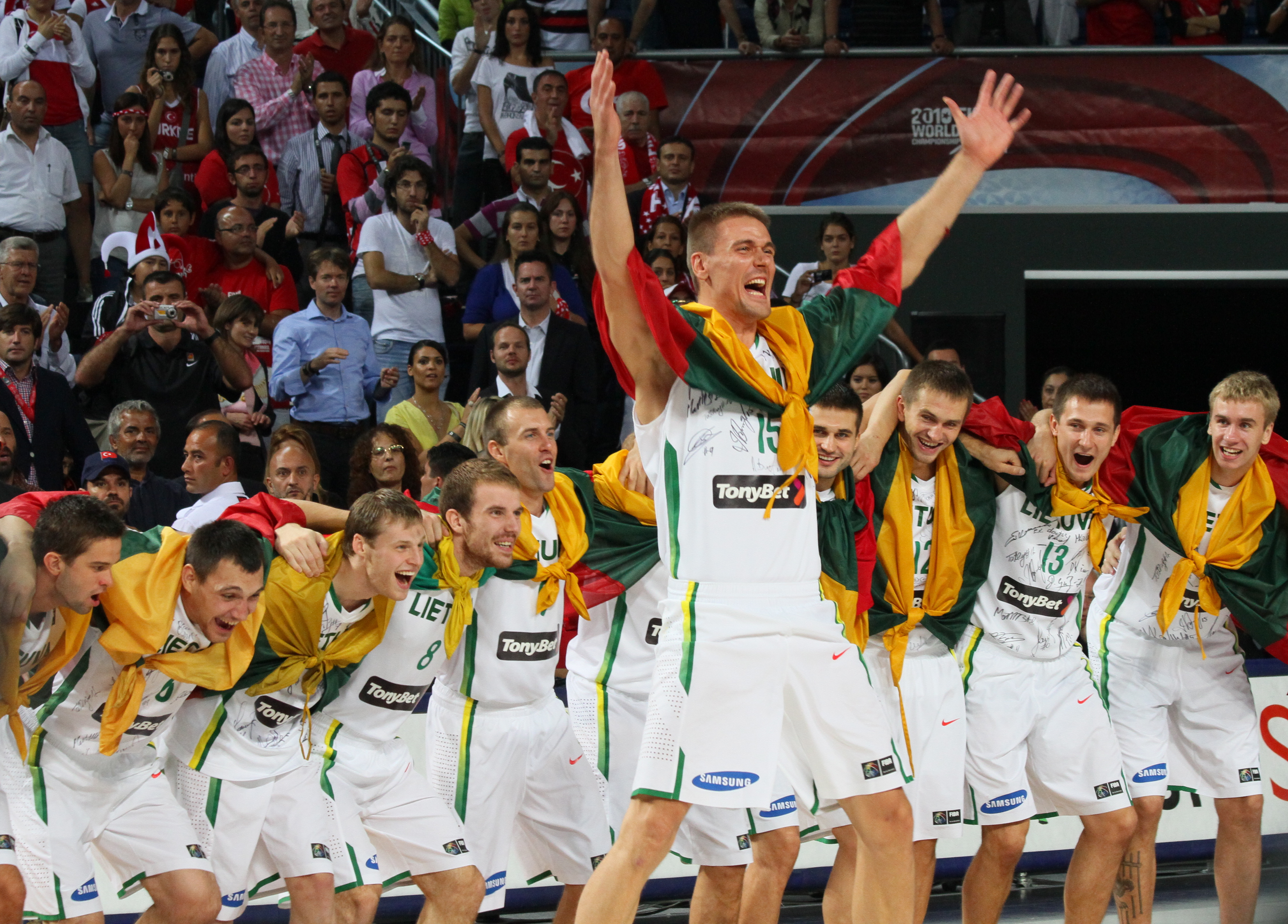
Lithuanian national basketball team at the World championships 2010

- Matas Buzelis
- Kasparas Jakučionis
- Ąžuolas Tubelis
- Arnoldas Kulboka
- Dainius Adomaitis
- Jonas Valančiūnas
- Romanas Brazdauskis
- Stepas Butautas
- Valdemaras Chomičius
- Darius Dimavičius
- Vladas Garastas
- Vidas Ginevičius
- Giedrius Gustas
- Žydrūnas Ilgauskas
- Simas Jasaitis
- Šarūnas Jasikevičius
- Paulius Jankūnas
- Robertas Javtokas
- Sergejus Jovaiša
- Andrius Jurkūnas
- Artūras Karnišovas
- Mantas Kalnietis
- Rimantas Kaukėnas
- Gintaras Krapikas
- Gintaras Einikis
- Linas Kleiza
- Tadas Klimavičius
- Rimas Kurtinaitis
- Darjuš Lavrinovič
- Kšyštof Lavrinovič
- Pranas Lubinas
- Darius Lukminas
- Arvydas Macijauskas
- Jonas Mačiulis
- Šarunas Marčiulionis
- Gvidonas Markevičius
- Darius Maskoliūnas
- Modestas Paulauskas
- Tomas Pačėsas
- Alvydas Pazdrazdis
- Virginijus Praškevičius
- Angelė Rupšienė
- Arvydas Sabonis
- Dainius Salenga
- Antanas Sireika
- Donatas Slanina
- Darius Songaila
- Kęstutis Šeštokas
- Ramūnas Šiškauskas
- Saulius Štombergas
- Mindaugas Timinskas
- Rytis Vaišvila
- Arūnas Visockas
- Eurelijus Žukauskas
- Mindaugas Žukauskas
- Deividas Sirvydis
- Ignas Brazdeikis
- Donatas Motiejūnas
- Mindaugas Kuzminskas
- Domantas Sabonis
- Martynas Andriuškevičius
- Justė Jocytė
- Laura Juškaitė

=== Biathlon ===
- Diana Rasimovičiūtė
- Algimantas Šalna
- Tomas Kaukėnas
- Vytautas Strolia

=== Boxing ===
- Egidijus Kavaliauskas
- Jonas Čepulis
- Jaroslavas Jakšto
- Ričardas Kuncaitis
- Evaldas Petrauskas
- Danas Pozniakas
- Daugirdas Šemiotas
- Ričardas Tamulis

=== Cycling ===
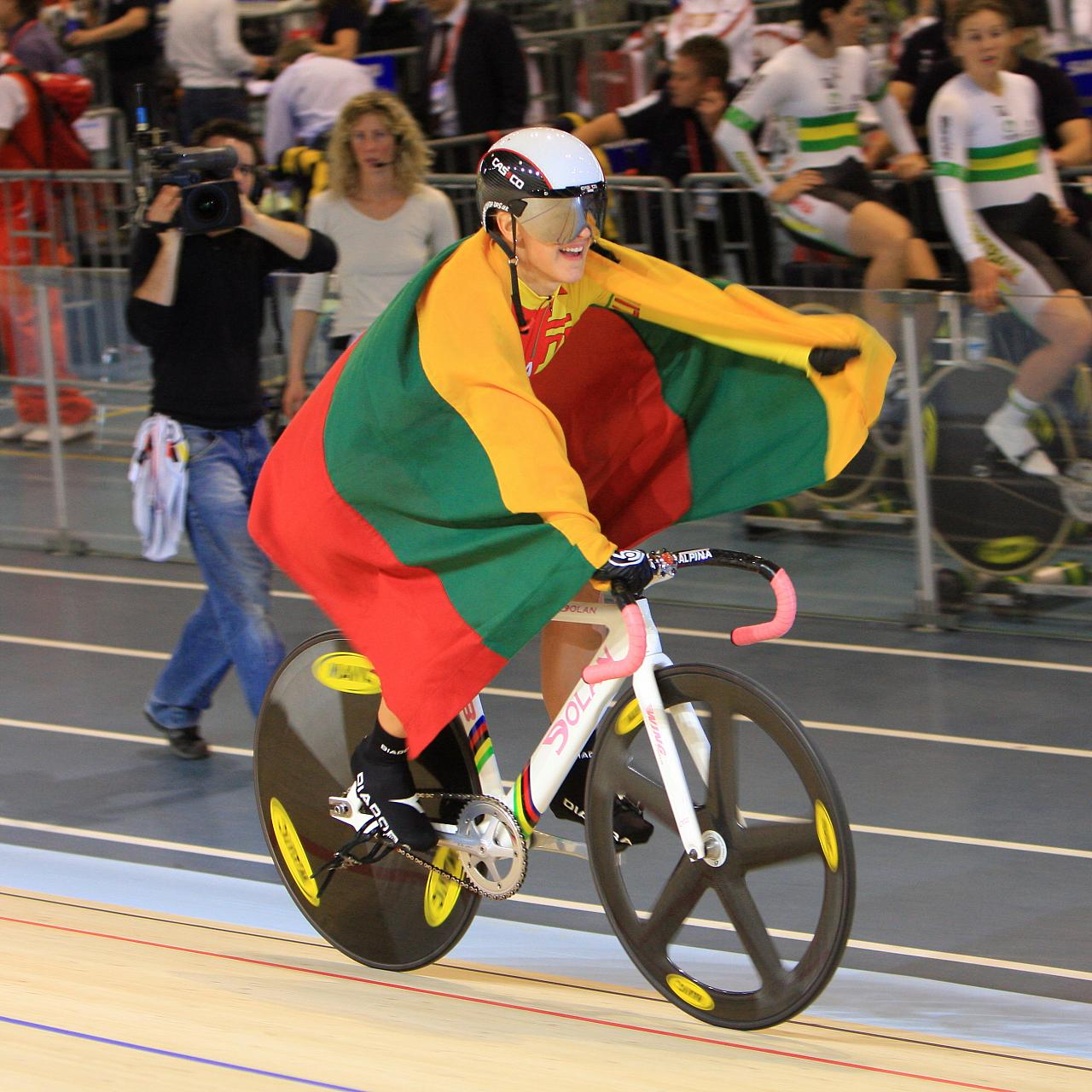
Simona Krupeckaitė

- Artūras Kasputis
- Ignatas Konovalovas
- Simona Krupeckaitė
- Jolanta Polikevičiūtė
- Rasa Polikevičiūtė
- Edita Pučinskaitė
- Vilija Sereikaitė
- Gintautas Umaras
- Zita Urbonaitė
- Laima Zilporytė
- Diana Žiliūtė

=== Canoeing ===
- Egidijus Balčiūnas
- Vladislavas Česiūnas
- Alvydas Duonėla
- Tomas Gadeikis
- Raimundas Labuckas
- Jevgenijus Šuklinas
- Aurimas Lankas
- Edvinas Ramanauskas

=== Figure skating ===
- Povilas Vanagas
- Saulius Ambrulevičius

=== Football ===
- Arvydas Janonis
- Arminas Narbekovas

=== Handball ===
- Sigita Mažeikaitė-Strečen
- Voldemaras Novickis
- Aidenas Malašinskas
- Jonas Truchanovičius

=== Ice hockey ===
- Dainius Zubrus
- Darius Kasparaitis
- Mantas Armalis
- Nerijus Ališauskas

=== Judo ===
- Gintaras Ambraska
- Marius Paškevičius
- Santa Pakenytė

=== Modern Pentathlon ===
- Laura Asadauskaitė
- Edvinas Krungolcas
- Stasys Šaparnis
- Andrejus Zadneprovskis

=== Orienteering ===
- Dainora Alšauskaitė
- Svajūnas Ambrazas
- Ramunė Arlauskienė
- Simonas Krėpšta
- Vilma Rudzenskaitė
- Ieva Sargautytė
- Indrė Valaitė
- Giedrė Voverienė
- Edgaras Voveris

=== Poker ===
- Tony G

=== Race driving ===
- Rokas Baciuška
- Kazim Vasiliauskas

=== Rowing ===
- Antanas Bagdonavičius
- Vytautas Briedis
- Vytautas Butkus
- Mindaugas Griškonis
- Zigmas Jukna
- Eleonora Kaminskaitė
- Klavdija Koženkova
- Rolandas Maščinskas
- Jonas Narmontas
- Jonas Pinskus
- Kristina Poplavskaja
- Genovaitė Ramoškienė
- Birutė Šakickienė
- Viktorija Senkutė

=== Sailing ===
- Gintarė Scheidt

=== Shooting ===
- Daina Gudzinevičiūtė

=== Skiing ===
- Vida Vencienė

=== Strongman sport ===
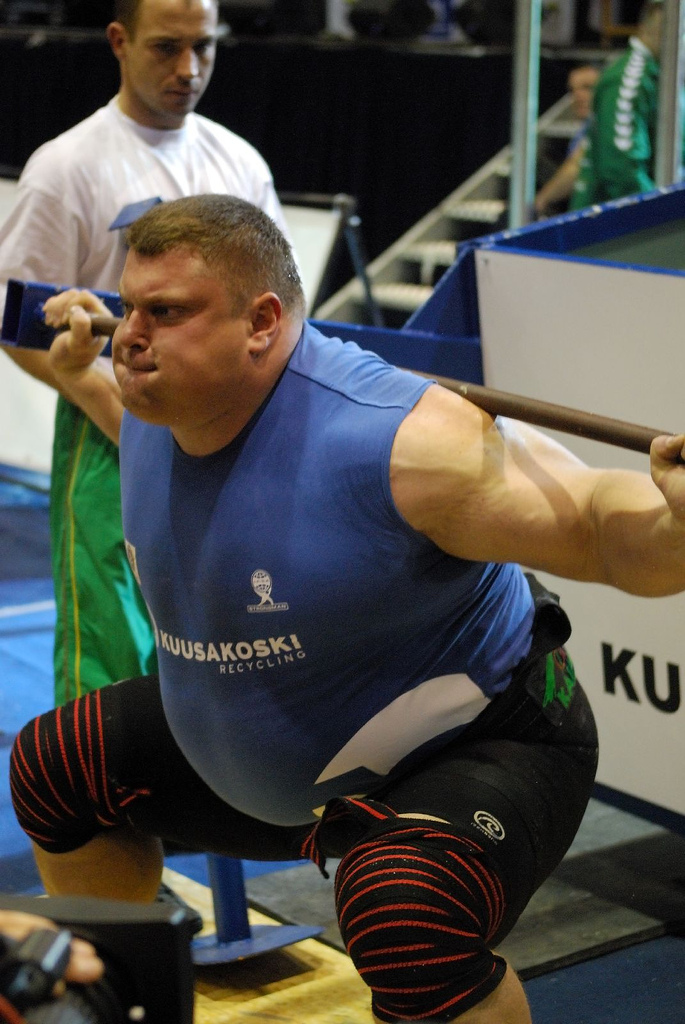
Žydrūnas Savickas

- Vidas Blekaitis
- Žydrūnas Savickas

=== Swimming ===
- Saulius Binevičius
- Rolandas Gimbutis
- Darius Grigalionis
- Vytautas Janušaitis
- Lina Kačiušytė
- Raimundas Mažuolis
- Ruta Meilutyte
- Giedrius Titenis
- Robertas Žulpa
- Danas Rapšys

=== Table tennis ===
- Rūta Paškauskienė

=== Tennis ===
- Ričardas Berankis
- Daniel Prenn (1904–1991) - Vilnius-born German, Polish, and British world-top-ten tennis player
- Vilius Gaubas
- Edas Butvilas

=== Volleyball ===
- Vasilijus Matuševas

=== Weightlifting ===
- Aurimas Didžbalis
- Žygimantas Stanulis
- Ramūnas Vyšniauskas

=== Wrestling ===
- Mindaugas Ežerskis
- Aleksandr Kazakevič
- Mindaugas Mizgaitis
- Edgaras Venckaitis
- Valdemaras Venckaitis

== See also ==
- Sport in Lithuania
