= Orienteering at the World Games =

Orienteering at the World Games is organized as an individual competition for both women and men, and a mix relay for teams of two men and two women.

The International Orienteering Federation (IOF) became a member of the International World Games Association (IWGA) in 1995. The World Games are held every four years, for sports that are not contested in the Olympic Games. Orienteering was first included in the program in 2001.

== Venues ==
Year	Days	Venue
2001	August 15–25	Akita, Japan
2005	July 14–24	Duisburg, Germany
2009	July 16–26	Kaohsiung, Chinese Taipei
2013	July 25 – August 4	Cali, Colombia
2017	July 20–30	Wrocław, Poland
2022	July 7–17	Birmingham, United States
2025	7—17 August	Chengdu, China

== Sprint ==
=== Men ===
Games	Gold	Silver	Bronze
2009 Kaohsiung	Andrey Khramov (RUS)	Daniel Hubmann (SUI)	Tero Föhr (FIN)
2013 Cali	Matthias Kyburz (SUI)	Andrey Khramov (RUS)	Jerker Lysell (SWE)
2017 Wrocław	Jerker Lysell (SWE)	Yannick Michiels (BEL)	Matthias Kyburz (SUI)
2022 Birmingham	Tim Robertson (NZL)	Martin Regborn (SWE)	Tomáš Křivda (CZE)
2025 Chengdu	Yannick Michiels (BEL)	Tomáš Křivda (CZE)	Zoltan Bujdoso (HUN)

=== Women ===
Games	Gold	Silver	Bronze
2009 Kaohsiung	Minna Kauppi (FIN)	Johanna Allston (AUS)	Elise Egseth (NOR)
2013 Cali	Annika Billstam (SWE)	Anne Margrethe Hausken (NOR)	Maja Alm (DEN)
2017 Wrocław	Maja Alm (DEN)	Elena Roos (SUI)	Lina Strand (SWE)
2022 Birmingham	Simona Aebersold (SUI)	Tereza Janošíková (CZE)	Elena Roos (SUI)
2025 Chengdu	Simona Aebersold (SUI)	Natalia Gemperle (SUI)	Maria Prieto del Campo (SPA)

== Individual/Middle ==
=== Men ===
Games	Gold	Silver	Bronze
2001 Akita	Grant Bluett (AUS)	Tore Sandvik (NOR)	Jamie Stevenson (GBR)
2005 Duisburg	Thierry Gueorgiou (FRA)	Daniel Hubmann (SUI)	Øystein Kvaal Østerbø (NOR)
2009 Kaohsiung	Daniel Hubmann (SUI)	Dmitry Tsvetkov (RUS)	Andrey Khramov (RUS)
2013 Cali	Matthias Kyburz (SUI)	Daniel Hubmann (SUI)	Vilius Aleliunas (LTU)
2017 Wrocław	Matthias Kyburz (SUI)	Florian Howald (SUI)	Vojtěch Král (CZE)
2022 Birmingham	Kasper Harlem Fosser (NOR)	Matthias Kyburz (SUI)	Martin Regborn (SWE)
2025 Chengdu	Riccardo Rancan (SUI)	Francesco Mariani (ITA)	Vegard Jarvis Westergard (CAN)

=== Women ===
Games	Gold	Silver	Bronze
2001 Akita	Hanne Staff (NOR)	Anette Granstedt (SWE)	Birgitte Husebye (NOR)
2005 Duisburg	Simone Niggli-Luder (SUI)	Karin Schmalfeld (GER)	Heather Monro (GBR)
2009 Kaohsiung	Johanna Allston (AUS)	Minna Kauppi (FIN)	Linnea Gustafsson (SWE)
2013 Cali	Minna Kauppi (FIN)	Tove Alexandersson (SWE)	Nadiya Volynska (UKR)
2017 Wrocław	Helena Jansson (SWE)	Natalia Gemperle (RUS)	Sabine Hauswirth (SUI)
2022 Birmingham	Simona Aebersold (SUI)	Karolin Ohlsson (SWE)	Ingrid Lundanes (NOR)
2025 Chengdu	Simona Aebersold (SUI)	Tereza Smelikova (CZE)	Alva Sonesson (SWE)

== Relay ==
=== Mixed ===
Games	Gold	Silver	Bronze	
2001 Akita	Norway (NOR); Bjørnar Valstad; Hanne Staff; Tore Sandvik; Birgitte Husebye	Lithuania (LTU); Svajūnas Ambrazas; Vilma Rudzenskaitė; Edgaras Voveris; Giedrė Voverienė	Sweden (SWE); Emil Wingstedt; Anette Granstedt; Niclas Jonasson; Jenny Johansson	Teams from 15 countries
2005 Duisburg	Switzerland (SUI); Matthias Merz; Lea Müller; Daniel Hubmann; Simone Niggli-Luder	Russia (RUS); Sergey Detkov; Aliya Sitdikova; Maxim Davydov; Tatiana Ryabkina	Czech Republic (CZE); Petr Losman; Marta Štěrbová; Tomáš Dlabaja; Dana Brožková	
2009 Kaohsiung	Russia (RUS); Dmitry Tsvetkov; Yulia Novikova; Andrey Khramov; Galina Vinogradova	Finland (FIN); Pasi Ikonen; Bodil Holmström; Tero Föhr; Minna Kauppi	Norway (NOR); Lars Skjeset; Mari Fasting; Øystein Kvaal Østerbø; Elise Egseth	
2013 Cali	Switzerland (SUI); Daniel Hubmann; Sara Lüscher; Matthias Kyburz; Judith Wyder	Denmark (DEN); Tue Lassen; Ida Bobach; Rasmus Thrane Hansen; Maja Alm	Austria (AUT); Gernot Kerschbaumer; Anna Nilsson Simkovics; Robert Merl; Ursula Kadan	
2017 Wrocław	Denmark (DEN); Cecilie Friberg Klysner; Søren Bobach; Andreas Hougaard Boesen; Maja Alm	Switzerland (SUI); Sabine Hauswirth; Florian Howald; Matthias Kyburz; Elena Roos	Russia (RUS); Natalia Gemperle; Dmitry Tsvetkov; Andrey Khramov; Galina Vinogradova	
2022 Birmingham	Switzerland (SUI); Simona Aebersold; Joey Hadorn; Matthias Kyburz; Elena Roos	Norway (NOR); Victoria Haestad Bjornstad; Havard Eidsmo; Kasper Harlem Fosser; Ingrid Lundanes	Great Britain (GBR); Cecilie Andersen; Jonny Crickmore; Ralph Street; Charlotte Ward	
2025 Chengdu	Switzerland (SUI); Natalia Gemperle; Riccardo Rancan; Tino Polsini; Simona Aebersold	Sweden (SWE); Emma Bjessmo; Jonatan Gustafsson; August Mollen; Alva Sonesson	Czech Republic (CZE); Denisa Králová; Jakub Glonek; Tomáš Křivda; Tereza Rauturier	
