= Mattias Karlsson =

Mattias Karlsson may refer to:

- Mattias Karlsson (orienteer) (born 1972), Swedish orienteering competitor
- Mattias Karlsson (ice hockey) (born 1985), Swedish professional ice hockey player
- Mattias Karlsson (politician, born 1977), Swedish politician with the Sweden Democrats
- Mattias Karlsson (politician, born 1972), Swedish politician with the Moderate Party
- Mattias Falck (né Karlsson), Swedish table tennis player
