= Anna Górnicka-Antonowicz =

Polish orienteering competitor

Personal information
- Nationality: Polish
- Born: 24 June 1968 (age 58)

Sport
- Sport: Orienteering
Medal record
Women's orienteering
Representing Poland
European Championships
Bronze medal – third place	2000 Truskavets	Short distance

Anna Górnicka-Antonowicz (born 24 June 1968) is a Polish orienteering competitor. She received a bronze medal in the short distance at the 2000 European Orienteering Championships in Truskavets, behind Jenny Johansson and Simone Luder. Her best result in the World Championships was 8th in the middle distance in 2003.
