= Svajūnas =

- Gender: Male
- Language: Lithuanian

Origin
- Region of origin: Lithuania

Svajūnas is a Lithuanian masculine given name. People bearing the name Svajūnas include:

- Svajūnas Adomaitis (born 1985), Lithuanian Greco-Roman wrestler
- Svajūnas Ambrazas (born 1967), Lithuanian orienteering competitor
- Svajūnas Jonauskas (born 1995), Lithuanian racing cyclist
