= Petr Losman =

Czech orienteering competitor (born 1979)

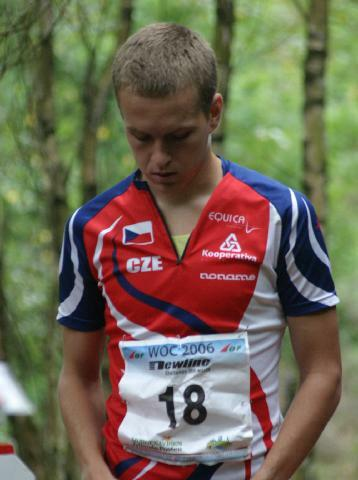
- Losman at WOC 2006 (Long Final)

Personal information
- Nationality: Czech
- Born: 31 October 1979 (age 46)
- Home town: Hradec Králové

Sport
- Sport: Orienteering
Medal record
Men's orienteering
Representing Czech Republic
World Games
Bronze medal – third place	2005 Duisburg	Relay

Petr Losman (born 31 October 1979) is a Czech orienteering competitor.

He won a bronze medal at the World Games in 2005 in the mixed relay, with Marta Štěrbová, Tomáš Dlabaja and Dana Brožková. His best achievements at the World Orienteering Championships are 7th in the sprint distance in 2003, and 10th in the sprint in 2005.

== See also ==
- List of orienteers
- List of orienteering events
