= Ieva Sargautytė =

Lithuanian orienteering competitor (born 1981)

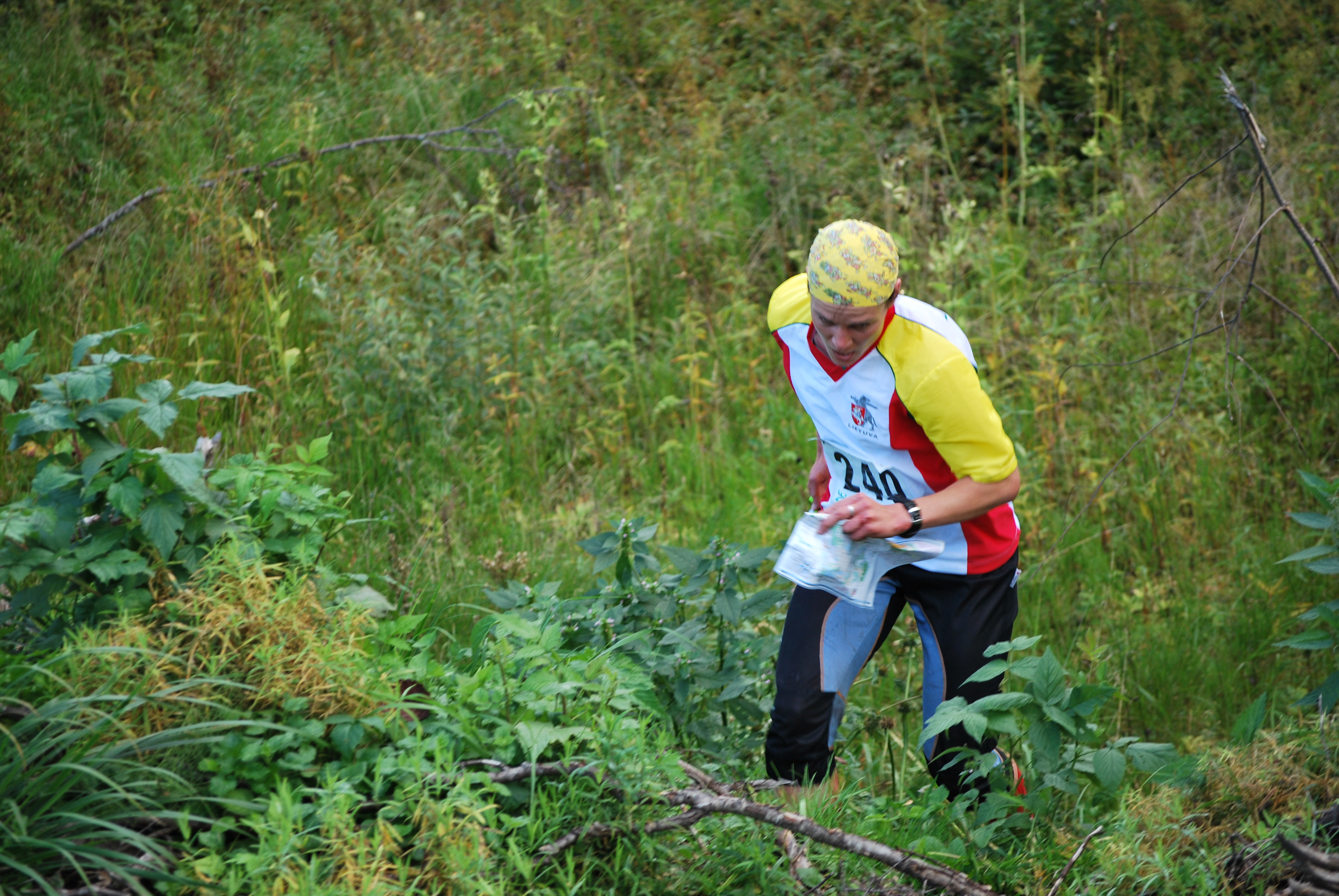
- Sargautytė in 2009

Medal record

Women's orienteering

Representing Lithuania

European Championships
Bronze medal – third place	2002 Sümeg	Relay

Junior World Championships
Silver medal – second place	2001 Miskolc	Short

Ieva Sargautytė (born 1981 in Vilnius) is a Lithuanian orienteering competitor. She received a bronze medal in relay at the 2002 European Orienteering Championships in Sümeg, together with Giedrė Voverienė and Vilma Rudzenskaitė. The same Lithuanian team finished 4th at the 2003 World Orienteering Championships in Rapperswil-Jona.

Sargautyte finished 7th in the sprint distance at the 2004 World Orienteering Championships in Västerås.
