= Barbara Bączek =

Polish orienteer (born 1972)

Personal information
- Full name: Barbara Bączek-Motała
- Nationality: Polish
- Born: 26 July 1972 (age 53) Iława, Poland

Sport
- Sport: Orienteering
- Club: WKS Wawel Kraków, OK Roneby
Medal record
Women's orienteering
Representing Poland
Junior World Championships
Gold medal – first place	1992 Jyväskylä	Short/Middle
Gold medal – first place	1992 Jyväskylä	Classic/Long

Barbara Bączek-Motała (born 26 July 1972 in Iława) is a Polish orienteer.

== Career ==
As a junior, Bączek won two gold medals in the short/middle distance and classic/long distance at the 1992 Junior World Championships in Jyväskylä. She also competed at the 1992 World University Orienteering Championships in Aberdeen.

Her best result in the World Championships was 6th in the long distance in 2003, she also competed in 2001, 1999, 1997, 1995, 1993 and 1991.

At the 2001 World Games, Bączek was a member of the team from Poland which finished 4th in the mixed relay event and she competed in the women's individual event.
