= Lars Skjeset =

Norwegian orienteer (born 1983)

Medal record

Men's orienteering

Representing Norway

World Games
Bronze medal – third place	2009 Kaohsiung	Mixed Relay

European Championships
Bronze medal – third place	2006 Otepää	Relay

Junior World Championships
Silver medal – second place	2003 Põlva	Relay

Lars Skjeset (born 1 March 1983) is a Norwegian orienteering competitor, and medal winner from World Games, European Championships and Junior World Championships. He represents the club Frol IL of Levanger.

== Junior career ==
Skjeset participated at the Junior World Orienteering Championships in Põlva in 2003, where he won a silver medal in the relay, together with Kristian Dalby and Audun Weltzien.

== Senior career ==
Skjeset received a bronze medal in relay at the European Orienteering Championships in 2006 in Otepää, together with Carl Waaler Kaas and Øystein Kvaal Østerbø. At the 2008 European Championships in Ventspils he finished 5th in the sprint. He participated at the World Games in 2009, obtaining a bronze medal in the mixed relay.
