= Karolina Arewång-Höjsgaard =

Swedish orienteering competitor

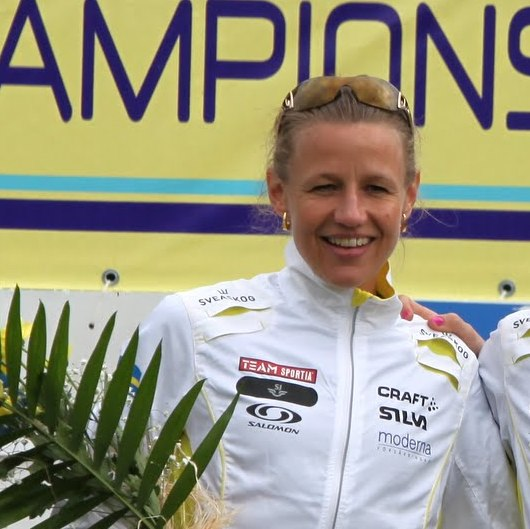
- Arewång-Höjsgaard at EOC 2010

Personal information
- Nationality: Swedish
- Born: 12 March 1971 (age 55)
Medal record
Women's orienteering
Representing Sweden
World Championships
Gold medal – first place	2004 Västerås	Long
Gold medal – first place	2004 Västerås	Relay
Silver medal – second place	2003 Rapperswil/Jona	Long
Silver medal – second place	2003 Rapperswil/Jona	Relay
Silver medal – second place	2004 Västerås	Sprint
Silver medal – second place	2006 Aarhus	Relay
Silver medal – second place	2009 Miskolc	Relay
Bronze medal – third place	2005 Aichi	Relay
European Championships
Gold medal – first place	2010 Primorsko	Relay
Junior World Championships
Bronze medal – third place	1991 Berlin	Middle

Karolina Arewång-Höjsgaard (born 12 March 1971) is a Swedish orienteering competitor. She won the 2004 Long distance World Orienteering Championships, and has silver medals from 2003 (Long distance) and 2004 (Sprint). She is Relay World Champion from 2004, and has silver medals from 2003 and 2006, and a bronze medal from 2005, as member of the Swedish team.

Karolina Arewång-Höjsgaard is European Champion from 2004 (Relay). She won Tiomila in 2000, 2005 with her club Domnarvets GoIF.
