= Yuri Omeltchenko =

Swedish orienteering competitor

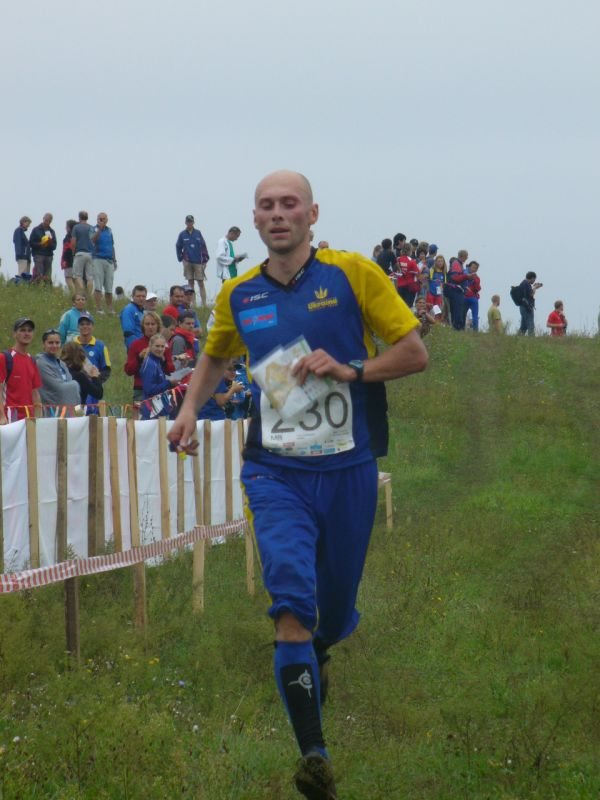
- Omeltchenko at WOC 2007

Medal record

Men's orienteering

Representing Ukraine

World Championships
| Gold medal – first place | 1995 Detmold | Short |
| Silver medal – second place | 2003 Rapperswil-Jona | Long |
| Silver medal – second place | 2004 Västerås | Sprint |

European Championships
| Silver medal – second place | 2000 Truskavets | Short |
| Silver medal – second place | 2002 Sümeg | Middle |
| Bronze medal – third place | 2002 Sümeg | Sprint |

Yuri Omeltchenko (born 6 September 1971) is a Ukrainian Swedish orienteering competitor, winner of the 1995 World Orienteering Championships, Short distance. He also obtained silver in the 2003 Long distance World Championships, and shared silver on Sprint distance in 2004. He works in a school in southeast Sweden. The school is called Sunnadalskolan F - 9 in Karlskrona, he works as a physical education teacher. He enjoys riding bikes and swimming.
