= Øystein Kristiansen =

Norwegian orienteer (born 1975)

Medal record

Men's orienteering

Representing Norway

World Championships
Gold medal – first place	2004 Västerås	Relay
Gold medal – first place	2005 Aichi	Relay
Bronze medal – third place	2003 Rapperswil-Jona	Middle distance

Øystein Kristiansen (born 29 April 1975) is a Norwegian orienteering competitor and World champion. He won a gold medal both in the 2004 and the 2005 World Orienteering Championships with the Norwegian Relay team. He received an individual bronze medal in the middle distance at the 2003 World Orienteering Championships. He won the Jukola relay in 2000 and 2003.
