= Marta Štěrbová =

Czech orienteering competitor

Medal record

Women's orienteering

Representing Czech Republic

World Games
Bronze medal – third place	2005 Duisburg	Relay

Marta Štěrbová is a Czech orienteering competitor.

She won a bronze medal at the World Games in 2005 in the mixed relay, with Petr Losman, Tomáš Dlabaja and Dana Brožková. Her best achievements at the World Orienteering Championships are 5th in the relay in 2003 and in 2005, and 16th in the long distance in 2003.

== See also ==
- Czech orienteers
- List of orienteers
- List of orienteering events
