= Lucia Näfen-Zehnder =

Personal information
- Full name: Lucia-Maria Näfen-Zehnder
- Born: 25 November 1962 (age 63)

Sport
- Sport: Skiing

Lucia-Maria Näfen-Zehnder, née Näfen (born 25 November 1962), is a Swiss ski mountaineer, long-distance runner and politician of the Christian Democratic People's Party of Switzerland Upper Valais.

Näfen is married with three children, and lives in Brig-Glis, where she was elected into the municipal council in 2008.

== Selected results ==
=== Ski mountaineering ===
- 2009:
  - 3rd, Zermatt-Rothorn run

==== Patrouille des Glaciers ====
- 2004: 5th, together with Nathalie Etzensperger and Brigitte Wolf
- 2008: 10th, together with Cornelia Ritler and Andrea Strohmeier

==== Trofeo Mezzalama ====
- 2009: 7th, together with Birgit Hosner and Annick Rey
- 2011: 8th, together with Marlen Knutti and Monika Ziegler

==== Pierra Menta ====
- 2011: 9th, together with Cécile Pasche
- 2012: 8th, together with Cécile Pasche

=== Running ===
- 2001:
  - 3rd, Jeizibärg-Lauf, Gampel
- 2002:
  - 1st (women II), Jeizibärg-Lauf, Gampel
- 2003:
  - 1st (women II), Jeizibärg-Lauf, Gampel
- 2004:
  - 1st (women II), Jeizibärg-Lauf, Gampel
- 2005:
  - 1st (women II), Jeizibärg-Lauf, Gampel
  - 1st (women II), Jeizibärg-Lauf & Dérupe Vercorin Trophy
  - 2nd (F40), Matterhorn run
- 2006:
  - 2nd (women 1), Jeizibärg-Lauf & Dérupe Vercorin Trophy
  - 3rd (F40), Matterhorn run
  - 3rd (women II), Jeizibärg-Lauf, Gampel
- 2007:
  - 1st (women 1), Jeizibärg-Lauf, Gampel
- 2008:
  - 2nd (F45), Matterhorn run
  - 3rd (women 1), Jeizibärg-Lauf / Valais Mountain Running Championship, Gampel
  - 4th (women 1), Dérupe Vercorin
- 2009:
  - 3rd (women I), Jeizibärg-Lauf / Upper Valais Running Cup / Valais Mountain Running Cup, Gampel
- 2010:
  - 2nd (women II), Hohsaas mountain run
  - 3rd (F45), Matterhorn run
  - 3rd (women I), Jeizibärg-Lauf / Mountain Running Cup, Gampel
- 2011:
  - 2nd (women I), Jeizibärg-Lauf, Gampel
