= Edgaras Voveris =

Lithuanian orienteering competitor (born 1967)

Medal record

Men's orienteering

Representing Lithuania

World Games
Silver medal – second place	2001 Akita	Relay

Edgaras Voveris (born 22 December 1967) is a Lithuanian orienteering competitor.

He received a silver medal at the 2001 World Games in the mixed relay, with Svajunas Ambrazas, Vilma Rudzenskaitė and Giedrė Voverienė.

His finished 12th in the classic distance at the 1997 World Orienteering Championships. In the 1999 World Orienteering Championships he finished 16th in the short distance, 13th in the classic, and 6th in the relay. In the 2004 World Orienteering Championships he finished 13th in the middle distance, and 6th in the relay with the Lithuanian team.

He now lives and trains in Minsk, Belarus.
