= Aliya Sitdikova =

Russian orienteering competitor

Medal record

Women's orienteering

Representing Russia

World Games
Silver medal – second place	2005 Duisburg	Relay

Aliya Sitdikova (born 1976) is a Russian orienteering competitor.

She won a silver medal at the World Games in 2005 in the mixed relay, with Sergey Detkov, Maxim Davydov and Tatiana Ryabkina.
