= Elisabeth Ingvaldsen =

Norwegian orienteering competitor

Medal record

Women's orienteering

Representing Norway

World Championships
Gold medal – first place	1999 Inverness	Relay
Silver medal – second place	1997 Grimstad	Relay
Bronze medal – third place	2001 Tampere	Relay
Bronze medal – third place	2003 Rapperswil-Jona	Relay
Bronze medal – third place	2004 Västerås	Sprint
Bronze medal – third place	2004 Västerås	Relay

European Championships
Gold medal – first place	2000 Truskavets	Relay
Gold medal – first place	2002 Sümeg	Relay
Silver medal – second place	2002 Sümeg	Sprint
Silver medal – second place	2004 Roskilde	Relay

Junior World Championships
Bronze medal – third place	1992 Jyväskylä	Middle
Bronze medal – third place	1992 Jyväskylä	Relay
Bronze medal – third place	1993 Kastelruth	Relay

Elisabeth Ingvaldsen (born 22 July 1973) is a Norwegian orienteering competitor and World champion. She won a gold medal in the 1999 World Orienteering Championships with the Norwegian relay team. She received a silver medal in 1997 and bronze medals in 2001, 2003 and 2004.

She won an individual bronze medal in sprint at the 2004 World Orienteering Championships.
