= Karin Schmalfeld =

German orienteering competitor

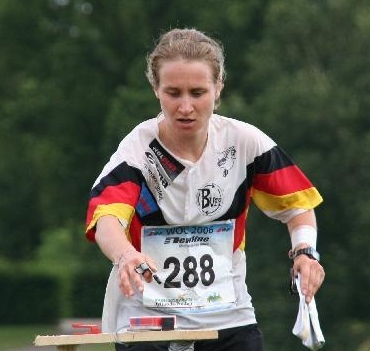

Medal record

Women's orienteering

Representing Germany

World Games
Silver medal – second place	2005 Duisburg	Individual

Junior World Championships
Silver medal – second place	1995 Horsens	Short
Bronze medal – third place	1996 Băile Govora	Long

Karin Schmalfeld (born 19 February 1976) is a German orienteering competitor.

She received a silver medal in the individual event at the World Games in 2005. She also competed in the mixed relay, where Germany finished 6th. Schmalfeld had the fourth and last leg, and advanced the German team from 11th to 6th position.

She has competed in eight World Orienteering Championships, between 1995 and 2009. Her best results were 9th in the short distance in 2001, 9th in the long distance in 2003, and 5th in the relay in 1995 with the German team.

== Junior career ==
Schmalfeld received a silver medal in the short distance in 1995 and a bronze medal in the classic distance in 1996 at the Junior World Orienteering Championships.
