= Michael Tabrett =

Australian rugby union player (1981–2003)

- Born: 16 July 1981
- Died: 7 December 2003 (aged 22) Brisbane, QLD, Australia
- Height: 6 ft 2 in (188 cm)
- Weight: 192 lb (87 kg)
- School: St Laurence's College

Rugby union career
- Position: Fullback
Super Rugby
Years	Team	Apps	(Points)
2001–03	Reds	7	(0)
Medal record
Rugby sevens
Representing Australia
World Games
Silver medal – second place	2001 Akita	Team competition

Michael Tabrett (16 July 1981 – 7 December 2003) was an Australian professional rugby union player.

== Rugby career ==
A St Laurence's College product, Tabrett played representative rugby for Australian schoolboys, Australia under-19s, Australia under-21s, Australia A and the Australia rugby sevens team. He was primarily a fullback and had three seasons in the Super 12 playing for the Queensland Reds, after making his state debut against the touring 2001 British Lions. In 2003, Tabrett was a member of the Australia A team for a tour of Japan.

== Personal life ==
Outside of rugby, Tabrett was an apprentice groundsman at Ballymore Stadium.

Tabrett died by suicide on 7 December 2003, at the age of 22.
