= Sergey Detkov =

Russian orienteering competitor

Medal record

Men's orienteering

Representing Russia

World Games
Silver medal – second place	2005 Duisburg	Relay

Junior World Championships
Silver medal – second place	1999 Varna	Short

CISM
Gold medal – first place	2012 Denmark	Team competition

Sergey Detkov (born 5 March 1979) is a Russian orienteering competitor.

He received a silver medal at the World Games in 2005 in the mixed relay, with Aliya Sitdikova, Maxim Davydov and Tatiana Ryabkina.

He received a silver medal in the short distance and finished 4th in the classic distance at the 1999 Junior World Orienteering Championships in Varna.
