= Maxim Davydov =

Russian orienteering competitor

Medal record

Men's orienteering

Representing Russia

World Games
Silver medal – second place	2005 Duisburg	Relay

Maxim Davydov (born 23 October 1976) is a Russian orienteering competitor.

He won a silver medal at the World Games in 2005 in the mixed relay, with Sergey Detkov, Aliya Sitdikova and Tatiana Ryabkina.
