= Tomáš Dlabaja =

Czech orienteering competitor

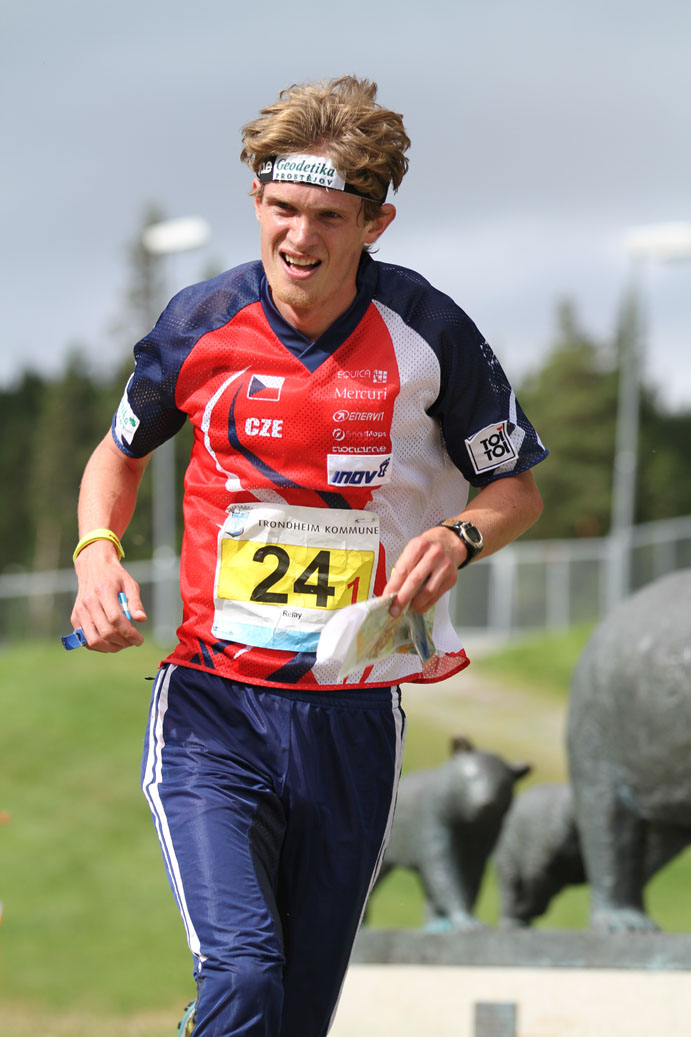
- Dlabaja at WOC 2010

Medal record

Men's orienteering

Representing Czech Republic

World Championships
Gold medal – first place	2012 Lausanne	Relay

World Games
Bronze medal – third place	2005 Duisburg	Relay

Tomáš Dlabaja (born 13 October 1983) is a Czech orienteering competitor.

World Champion in the relay at World Orienteering Championships 2012 in Switzerland along with Jan Sedivy and Jan Prochazka after nearly giving up the elite orienteering career the same year. This fast Czech runner got his breakthrough with a bronze medal at the World Games in 2005 in the mixed relay, with Petr Losman, Marta Štěrbová and Dana Brožková. And individually with a 6th place at the WOC 2007 over the sprint. He repeated his success at the home World Championships in Olomouc in 2008, where he placed sixth in the sprint, 13th in the middle distance, and fourth in the relay with the Czech team. Since then has struggled to get these top individual results, but training hard again in Finland in the 2013 season after the WOC gold in 2012. In 2014, he finished his university studies and sport career as well.

Occasionally he took part in cross-country running or adventure races (e.g. Dolomitenmann 2011: 1. Place in the amateur class)

== See also ==
- List of orienteers
- List of orienteering events
