= Mattias Karlsson (orienteer) =

Swedish orienteering competitor (born 1972)

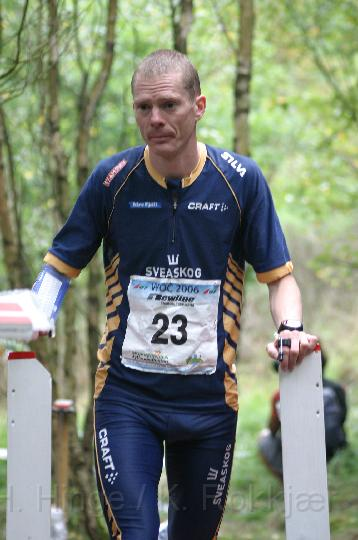
- M.Karlsson at WOC 2006

Medal record

Men's orienteering

Representing Sweden

World Championships
Gold medal – first place	2003 Rapperswil/Jona	Relay
Silver medal – second place	2004 Västerås	Long
Bronze medal – third place	2004 Västerås	Relay
Bronze medal – third place	2006 Aarhus	Relay

Mattias Karlsson (born 6 February 1972) is a Swedish orienteering competitor. He is Relay World Champion from 2003, as a member of the Swedish winning team in the World Orienteering Championship in Rapperswil-Jona, Switzerland. He also has bronze medals from 2004 and 2006 (relay), and obtained silver in the 2004 Long distance World Championships in Västerås, Sweden. He is several times Swedish Champion, in 1998 (Long distance), in 1999 (Long distance), in 2002 (both Long distance and Night Orienteering), and in 2006 (Relay).

Karlsson won the Jukola relay in 1991 and 2010.
