= Vladimír Lučan =

Czech orienteering competitor

Medal record

Men's orienteering

Representing Czech Republic

European Championships
Silver medal – second place	2000 Truskavets	Relay

Junior World Championships
Gold medal – first place	1996 Băile Govora	Govora
Silver medal – second place	1997 Leopoldsburg	Classic
Silver medal – second place	1997 Leopoldsburg	Relay

Vladimír Lučan (born 4 June 1977, Zlín) is a Czech orienteering competitor. He received a silver medal in relay at the 2000 European Orienteering Championships in Truskavets, together with Michal Jedlička and Rudolf Ropek. He has a silver medal from the 1997 Junior World Orienteering Championships in Leopoldsburg.

== See also ==
- Czech orienteers
- List of orienteers
- List of orienteering events
