= Ukraine at the 2001 World Games =

Ukraine at the World Games 2001
- IOC code: UKR
- NOC: National Olympic Committee of Ukraine

in Akita, Japan 16 – 26 August 2001
- Competitors: 18 in 5 sports
- Medals Ranked 32nd: Gold 1 Silver 0 Bronze 0 Total 1

World Games appearances (overview)
- 1993; 1997; 2001; 2005; 2009; 2013; 2017; 2022; 2025

Ukraine competed at the 2001 World Games in Akita, Japan, from 16 to 26 August 2001. Ukrainian athletes competed in beach handball (women's team), bodybuilding (1), orienteering (2), powerlifting (3), and trampoline gymnastics (2).

== Medalists ==
=== Main programme ===
Medal	Name	Sport	Event
Gold	Oxana Tsyhuleva; Olena Movchan	Trampoline gymnastics	Women's synchronized trampoline

=== Invitational sports ===
Medal	Name	Sport	Event
Gold	Ukraine women's national beach handball team	Beach handball	Women's tournament

== Orienteering ==
Women's

Athlete	Event	Time	Rank
Nina Vinnytska	Women's individual	40:35.1	14
Nataliya Potopalska	Women's individual	41:41.1	18

== External sources ==
- Infosystem of the 2005 World Games
