= Hanne Staff =

Norwegian orienteering competitor

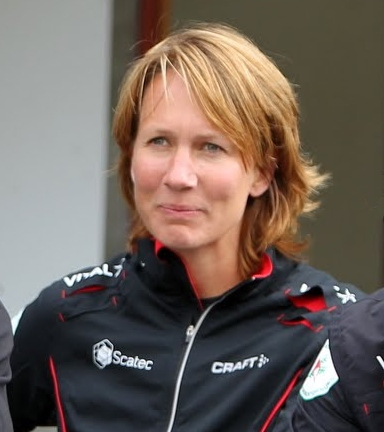
- Staff at WOC 2010

Medal record

Women's orienteering

Representing Norway

World Championships
Gold medal – first place	1997 Grimstad	Long
Gold medal – first place	1999 Inverness	Relay
Gold medal – first place	2001 Tampere	Short
Gold medal – first place	2004 Västerås	Middle
Silver medal – second place	1997 Grimstad	Relay
Silver medal – second place	1999 Inverness	Long
Silver medal – second place	2003 Rapperswil/Jona	Middle
Silver medal – second place	2004 Västerås	Long
Bronze medal – third place	1997 Grimstad	Middle
Bronze medal – third place	2001 Tampere	Relay
Bronze medal – third place	2003 Rapperswil/Jona	Relay
Bronze medal – third place	2004 Västerås	Relay

World Cup
Gold medal – first place	1998	WC Overall
Gold medal – first place	2000	WC Overall
Bronze medal – third place	1996	WC Overall
Bronze medal – third place	2002	WC Overall

World Games
Gold medal – first place	2001 Akita	Short
Gold medal – first place	2001 Akita	Relay

European Championships
Gold medal – first place	2000 Truskavets	Classic
Gold medal – first place	2000 Truskavets	Relay
Gold medal – first place	2002 Sümeg	Relay
Gold medal – first place	2004 Roskilde	Middle
Silver medal – second place	2002 Sümeg	Classic
Silver medal – second place	2004 Roskilde	Relay

Junior World Championships
Gold medal – first place	1990 Älvsbyn	Relay
Bronze medal – third place	1991 Berlin	Relay
Bronze medal – third place	1992 Jyväskylä	Long
Bronze medal – third place	1992 Jyväskylä	Relay

Hanne Staff (born 3 February 1972) is a Norwegian orienteering competitor who has won three individual World Orienteering Championships gold medals.

She retired from international orienteering at the end of the 2004 season where she became world champion in the middle distance event.

Staff ran for the Norwegian orienteering club Bækkelagets SK in Oslo.

== Personal life ==
Staff is married to fellow orienteer Bjørnar Valstad.

== Achievements ==
Orienteering World Cup Victories

- Gold, Short Distance, 2000 Australia
- Gold, Classic Distance, 1998 Ireland
- Gold, Classic Distance, 1998 Poland
- Gold, Classic Distance, 1998 Estonia
- Gold, Classic Distance, 1998 Finland
- Gold, Classic Distance, 1996 Lithuania
- Silver, Long Distance, 2002 Switzerland
- Silver, Long Distance, 2002 Sweden
- Silver, Long Distance, 2002 Hungary
- Silver, Short Distance, 1996 Sweden
- Bronze, Long Distance, 2002 Belgium
- Bronze, Sprint Distance, 2002 Switzerland
- Bronze, Long Distance, 2002 Norway
- Bronze, Long Distance, 2002 Czech Republic
- Bronze, Short Distance, 2000 Finland
- Bronze, Long Distance, 2000 Portugal

Orienteering at the World Games

- Gold, Short Distance, 2001 Japan
- Gold, Relay Event, 2001 Japan
