= Birgitte Husebye =

Norwegian orienteering competitor

Medal record

Women's orienteering

Representing Norway

World Championships
Gold medal – first place	1999 Inverness	Relay
Bronze medal – third place	2001 Tampere	Relay
Bronze medal – third place	2003 Rapperswil/Jona	Relay
Bronze medal – third place	2004 Västerås	Relay

European Championships
Gold medal – first place	2000 Truskavets	Relay
Gold medal – first place	2002 Sümeg	Relay
Bronze medal – third place	2002 Sümeg	Long
Bronze medal – third place	2002 Sümeg	Middle

Junior World Championships
Bronze medal – third place	1993 Kastelruth	Relay

World Games
Gold medal – first place	2001 Akita	Relay
Bronze medal – third place	2001 Akita	Short

Birgitte N. Husebye (born 25 October 1973) is a Norwegian orienteering competitor. She is Relay World Champion from 1999, and has three bronze medals from the 2001, 2003 and 2004 World Orienteering Championships.
