= Anette Granstedt =

Swedish orienteer

Medal record

Women's orienteering

Representing Sweden

World Championships
Gold medal – first place	1993 Harriman	Relay
Silver medal – second place	1995 Detmold	Relay
Bronze medal – third place	1999 Inverness	Relay

World Games
Silver medal – second place	2001 Akita	Short
Bronze medal – third place	2001 Akita	Relay

Anette Nilsson-Granstedt (born 24 January 1968) is a Swedish orienteering competitor. She is Relay World Champion from 1993, as a member of the Swedish winning team. She also has a silver medal from 1995, and a bronze medal from 1999.
