= 2004 World Orienteering Championships =

2004 edition of the World Orienteering Championships

- Host city: Västerås
- Country: Sweden
- Events: 8

The 2004 World Orienteering Championships, the 21st World Orienteering Championships, were held in Västerås, Sweden, 11 –19 September 2004.

The championships had eight events; sprint for men and women, middle distance for men and women, long distance (formerly called individual or classic distance) for men and women, and relays for men and women.

== Medalists ==
Event	Gold		Silver		Bronze	
Men's sprint	Niclas Jonasson (SWE)	13.06,5	Håkan Eriksson (SWE); Yuri Omeltchenko (UKR)	13.09,0	N/A	
Women's sprint	Simone Niggli-Luder (SUI)	12.32,2	Karolina Arewång-Höjsgaard (SWE)	13.01,1	Elisabeth Ingvaldsen (NOR)	13.19,5
Men's middle distance	Thierry Gueorgiou (FRA)	32.45,9	Valentin Novikov (RUS)	33.07,1	Anders Nordberg (NOR)	33.12,3
Women's middle distance	Hanne Staff (NOR)	33.03,1	Tatiana Ryabkina (RUS)	33.14,9	Heli Jukkola (FIN)	33.30,3
Men's long distance	Bjørnar Valstad (NOR)	1:45.25,3	Mattias Karlsson (SWE)		Holger Hott Johansen (NOR)	
Women's long distance	Karolina Arewång-Höjsgaard (SWE)	1:22.25,4	Hanne Staff (NOR)		Marika Mikkola (FIN)	
Men's relay	Norway (NOR): Bjørnar Valstad; Øystein Kristiansen; Jørgen Rostrup	2:08.08,5	Russia (RUS): Michael Mamleev; Andrey Khramov; Valentin Novikov		Sweden (SWE): Mattias Karlsson; Emil Wingstedt; Niclas Jonasson	
Women's relay	Sweden (SWE): Gunilla Svärd; Jenny Johansson; Karolina Arewång-Höjsgaard	1:53.41,0	Finland (FIN): Marika Mikkola; Minna Kauppi; Heli Jukkola		Norway (NOR): Birgitte Husebye; Elisabeth Ingvaldsen; Hanne Staff	
