= Tore Sandvik =

Norwegian orienteer (born 1972)

Medal record

Men's orienteering

Representing Norway

World Championships
Gold medal – first place	1999 Inverness	Relay
Silver medal – second place	2001 Tampere	Short distance
Silver medal – second place	2001 Tampere	Relay

World Cup
Silver medal – second place	2000	Overall

World Games
Gold medal – first place	2001 Japan	Relay
Silver medal – second place	2001 Japan	Individual

European Championships
Silver medal – second place	2000 Ukraine	Short distance

Junior World Championships
Bronze medal – third place	1990 Älvsbyn	Relay

Tore Sandvik (born 30 May 1972) is a Norwegian orienteering competitor and World champion. He won a gold medal in the 1999 World Orienteering Championships in Inverness with the Norwegian Relay team.

== International results ==
Sandvik won two silver medals in the 2001 World Orienteering Championships in Tampere. He finished overall second in the 2000 World Cup. He received a gold medal (relay) and a silver medal in the 2001 World Games, and earned a silver medal in the 2000 European Championships.

== Club and national results ==
Sandvik is a member of the club Halden SK. He has eight victories in Tiomila (1998, 1999, 2000, 2002, 2003, 2004, 2006, 2007), and four victories in the Jukola relay (1995, 1998, 2000, 2003). Eighteen medals in national championships, including six gold medals.
