= Niclas Jonasson =

Swedish orienteering competitor

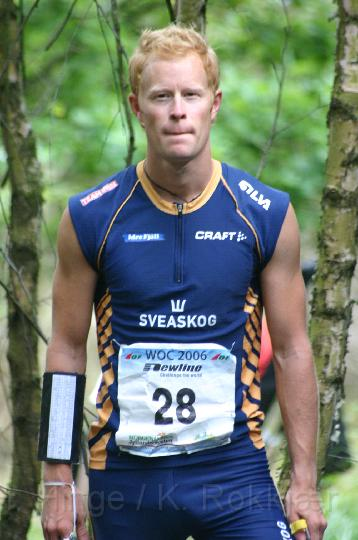

Personal information
- Nationality: Swedish
- Born: 14 June 1976 (age 50)

Sport
- Sport: Orienteering
Medal record
Men's orienteering
Representing Sweden
World Championships
Gold medal – first place	2003 Rapperswil-Jona	Relay
Gold medal – first place	2004 Västerås	Sprint
Bronze medal – third place	2004 Västerås	Relay
Bronze medal – third place	2006 Aarhus	Relay
World Games
Bronze medal – third place	2001 Akita	Relay
European Championships
Gold medal – first place	2006 Otepää	Relay

Niclas Jonasson (born 14 June 1976) is a Swedish orienteering competitor and world champion.

He received a gold medal in sprint at the 2004 World Orienteering Championships, and gold medal in relay in 2003, as a member of the Swedish winning team. He received bronze medals in relay at the 2004 and 2006 world championships, and a gold medal in relay at the European Orienteering Championships in 2006.
