= Grant Bluett =

Australian orienteering competitor

Medal record

Men's orienteering

Representing Australia

World Games
Gold medal – first place	2001 Akita	Individual

Grant Bluett (born 6 November 1972) is an Australian orienteering competitor.

He won a gold medal in the individual event at the World Games in 2001.

In perhaps the biggest upset in the history of world-level orienteering, Grant Bluett (Australia) won the men's race to become the first men's World Games orienteering champion. His victory is the first ever senior individual medal by a Non-European competitor and a great boost for orienteering as a world sport.

His best results at the World Orienteering Championships are the 8th position in the sprint distance in 2003, and 6th in the relay in 2001 with the Australian team.

"Constable Frogga", as he is known to his friends, is a well-respected Australian orienteer and his wisdom is much sought after by juniors from all states.

In 2012, "The Human in car navigation system" was added to the World Orienteering Hall of Fame. The "Garmin" of Canberra stated that this honour, coupled with his under-8 participation award for running in circles, was the proudest moment of his life.

"Bluey", as he is affectionately known in social circles, continues to coach youngsters in an effort to raise the non-existent status of competitive orienteering.

World Orienteering Championships Results

Year	Sprint	Middle	Long	Relay
2005	28		DQ	15
2004	18	17		10
2003	8	47		9
2001	11	30	17	6
1999				10
1997		28	DQ	11
1995		35	57	13
1993				11

== See also ==
- List of orienteers
- List of orienteering events
