= Michal Jedlička =

Czech orienteering competitor

Medal record

Men's orienteering

Representing Czech Republic

World Championships
Bronze medal – third place	2001 Tampere	Relay

European Championships
Silver medal – second place	2000 Truskavets	Relay

Michal Jedlička (born 19 September 1973) is a Czech orienteering competitor. He received a bronze medal in the relay at the 2001 World Orienteering Championships with the Czech team.

He received a silver medal in relay at the 2000 European Orienteering Championships in Truskavets.

== See also ==
- List of orienteers
- List of orienteering events
