= Simone Niggli-Luder =

Swiss orienteering competitor

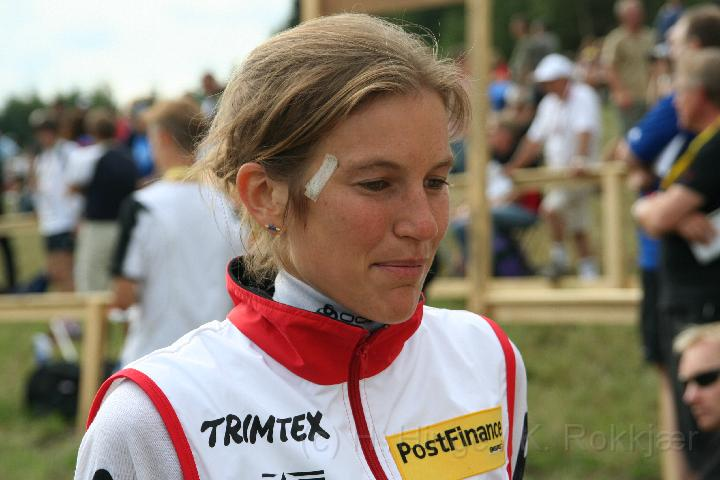
- Simone Niggli-Luder in 2006.

Personal information
- Nationality: Swiss
- Born: 9 January 1978 (age 48) Burgdorf
- Education: University of Bern
- Years active: 1988 - 2013

Sport
- Sport: Orienteering
- Club: OLV Hindelbank
Medal record
Women's orienteering
Representing Switzerland
World Championships
Gold medal – first place	2001 Tampere	Long
Gold medal – first place	2003 Rapperswil-Jona	Sprint
Gold medal – first place	2003 Rapperswil-Jona	Middle
Gold medal – first place	2003 Rapperswil-Jona	Long
Gold medal – first place	2003 Rapperswil-Jona	Relay
Gold medal – first place	2004 Västerås	Sprint
Gold medal – first place	2005 Aichi	Sprint
Gold medal – first place	2005 Aichi	Middle
Gold medal – first place	2005 Aichi	Long
Gold medal – first place	2005 Aichi	Relay
Gold medal – first place	2006 Aarhus	Middle
Gold medal – first place	2006 Aarhus	Long
Gold medal – first place	2007 Kyiv	Sprint
Gold medal – first place	2007 Kyiv	Middle
Gold medal – first place	2009 Miskolc	Long
Gold medal – first place	2010 Trondheim	Sprint
Gold medal – first place	2010 Trondheim	Long
Gold medal – first place	2012 Lausanne	Sprint
Gold medal – first place	2012 Lausanne	Long
Gold medal – first place	2012 Lausanne	Relay
Gold medal – first place	2013 Vuokatti	Sprint
Gold medal – first place	2013 Vuokatti	Middle
Gold medal – first place	2013 Vuokatti	Long
Silver medal – second place	2006 Aarhus	Sprint
Silver medal – second place	2010 Trondheim	Middle
Bronze medal – third place	2001 Tampere	Sprint
Bronze medal – third place	2006 Aarhus	Relay
Bronze medal – third place	2007 Kyiv	Long
Bronze medal – third place	2009 Miskolc	Middle
Bronze medal – third place	2009 Miskolc	Sprint
Bronze medal – third place	2013 Vuokatti	Relay
World Games
Gold medal – first place	2005 Duisburg	Middle
Gold medal – first place	2005 Duisburg	Relay
World Cup
Gold medal – first place	2002	WC Overall
Gold medal – first place	2004	WC Overall
Gold medal – first place	2005	WC Overall
Gold medal – first place	2006	WC Overall
Gold medal – first place	2007	WC Overall
Gold medal – first place	2009	WC Overall
Gold medal – first place	2010	WC Overall
Gold medal – first place	2012	WC Overall
Gold medal – first place	2013	WC Overall
Silver medal – second place	2000	WC Overall
European Championships
Gold medal – first place	2002 Sümeg	Classic
Gold medal – first place	2004 Roskilde	Sprint
Gold medal – first place	2004 Roskilde	Long
Gold medal – first place	2006 Otepää	Sprint
Gold medal – first place	2006 Otepää	Long
Gold medal – first place	2010 Primorsko	Middle
Gold medal – first place	2010 Primorsko	Long
Gold medal – first place	2012 Falun	Sprint
Gold medal – first place	2012 Falun	Middle
Gold medal – first place	2012 Falun	Long
Silver medal – second place	2000 Truskavets	Short
Silver medal – second place	2002 Sümeg	Relay
Silver medal – second place	2006 Otepää	Relay
Silver medal – second place	2010 Primorsko	Sprint
Bronze medal – third place	2010 Primorsko	Relay
Nordic Championships
Gold medal – first place	2007 Bornholm	Middle
Gold medal – first place	2007 Bornholm	Long
Silver medal – second place	2001 Mikkeli	Classic
Silver medal – second place	2005 Notodden	Sprint
Silver medal – second place	2005 Notodden	Middle
Silver medal – second place	2005 Notodden	Long
Silver medal – second place	2007 Bornholm	Relay
Bronze medal – third place	2005 Notodden	Relay
Junior World Championships
Gold medal – first place	1997 Leopoldsburg	Classic
Silver medal – second place	1996 Govora	Relay
Bronze medal – third place	1997 Leopoldsburg	Relay
Bronze medal – third place	1998 Reims	Relay

Simone Niggli-Luder (born 9 January 1978) is a Swiss orienteering athlete who has twice won (in 2003 and 2005) all four women's competitions at the world championships. She is widely seen as one of the greatest orienteers of all time.

== Personal life ==
Born as Simone Luder, she grew up in Burgdorf in the Canton of Bern. She studied biology at the University of Bern, where she graduated in 2003. That same year, she married Matthias Niggli, also a Swiss orienteering athlete. They currently live in Münsingen near Bern and in Ulricehamn, Sweden.

== Orienteering achievements ==
She began competing in orienteering early on, joining the Swiss club OLV Hindelbank; at the age of ten, she participated in her first competition. Since then, her palmarès has been impressive: she won a gold medal at the junior world championships in 1997, has been 20 times Swiss champion, won the Finnish championships once and the Swedish championships nine times, has won the world cup five times, and won seven gold medals at European championships and a total of 23 gold medals at world championships.

In 2003, she won all four women's competitions of the world championships held at Rapperswil in Switzerland (sprint, middle, and long distance, and— together with Birgitte Wolf and Vroni König-Salmi— the relay). She managed to repeat this extraordinary feat two years later at the world championships in Aichi, Japan.

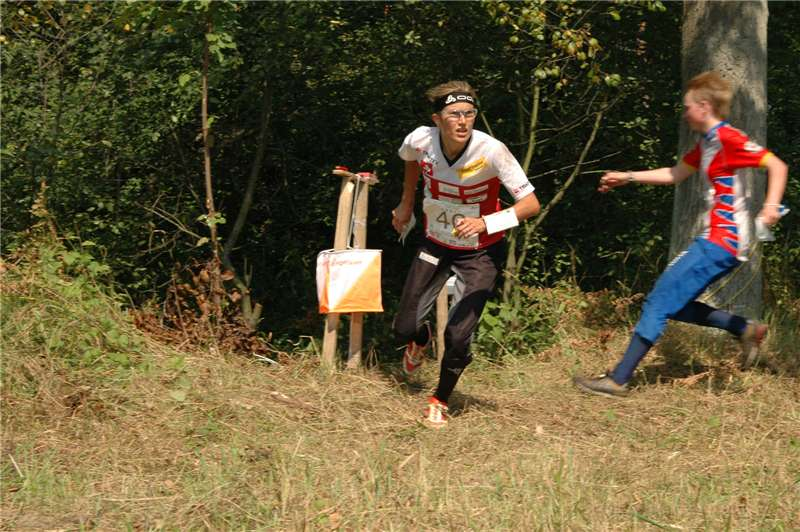
Simone Niggli-Luder and Marianne Andersen at World Orienteering Championships 2007

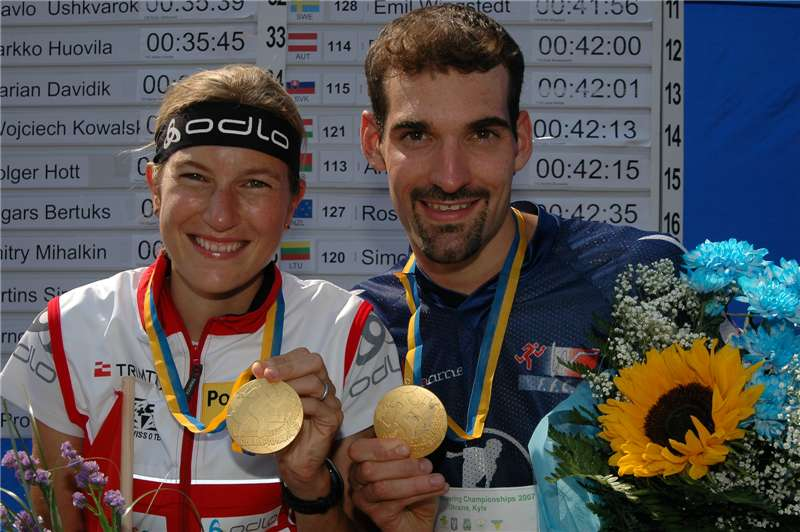
Simone Niggli-Luder and Frenchman Thierry Gueorgiou, middle distance gold medalists, World Orienteering Championships 2007

At the European Championships in 2006 in Otepää, Estonia, she won gold in the sprint and long distance competitions, and finished fifth in the middle distance competition. The Swiss team finished second in the relay, beaten only by the Finnish team. At the world championships 2007 in Kyiv, Ukraine, she again won gold on the middle and sprint distances and finished third on the long distance, behind two Finnish athletes who shared first place.

Niggli-Luder took time off from competitive orienteering in 2008 to give birth to her first child and again in 2011, twins. She made a successful return to the international orienteering scene in 2009 by winning bronze medals in the middle and sprint distances at the World Orienteering Championships in Miskolc, Hungary, and the gold medal in the long distance. At the World Championships 2013 at Vuokatti, Finland, she won all three single competitions (sprint, middle, and long distance) and finished third in the team relay event (together with Sara Luescher and Judith Wyder).

In 2001, she spent one year in Finland, running for the Finnish club Turun Suunnistajat, and won the Finnish championship. She ran for the Swedish club Ulricehamns OK after July 2003. In September 2013, Niggli-Luder announced that she was retiring from elite orienteering at the end of the year, after the last World Cup race in New Zealand. Niggli holds over 60 World Cup race victories.

== World Championship results ==
Year
Year	Age	Long	Middle	Sprint	Relay	Sprint; Relay
1999	21	—	15	—N/a	—	—N/a
2001	23	Gold	4	Bronze	4	—N/a
2003	25	Gold	Gold	Gold	Gold	—N/a
2004	26	4	6	Gold	4	—N/a
2005	27	Gold	Gold	Gold	Gold	—N/a
2006	28	Gold	Gold	Silver	3	—N/a
2007	29	Bronze	Gold	Gold	4	—N/a
2008	30	—	—	—	—	—N/a
2009	31	Gold	Bronze	Bronze	4	—N/a
2010	32	Gold	Silver	Gold	4	—N/a
2011	33	—	—	—	—	—N/a
2012	34	Gold	5	Gold	Gold	—N/a
2013	35	Gold	Gold	Gold	Bronze	—N/a

Awards
Preceded by Natascha Badmann	Swiss Sportswoman of the Year; 2003	Succeeded by Karin Thürig
Preceded by Karin Thürig	Swiss Sportswoman of the Year; 2005	Succeeded by Tanja Frieden
Preceded by Tanja Frieden	Swiss Sportswoman of the Year; 2007	Succeeded by Ariella Kaeslin
