= Brigitte Wolf =

Swiss orienteering competitor (born 1967)

Personal information
- Born: 7 May 1967 (age 59)

Sport
- Sport: Skiing
Medal record
Women's orienteering
Representing Switzerland
World Championships
Gold medal – first place	2003 Rapperswil-Jona	Relay
Bronze medal – third place	2003 Rapperswil-Jona	Long
Bronze medal – third place	1997 Grimstad	Relay
European Championships
Silver medal – second place	2000 Truskavets	Long
Silver medal – second place	2002 Sümeg	Middle
Silver medal – second place	2002 Sümeg	Relay

Brigitte Wolf (born 7 May 1967) is a Swiss orienteering competitor and ski mountaineer.

== Selected results ==
=== Orienteering ===
Wolf is Relay World Champion as a member of the Swiss winning team in 2003, as well as having a bronze medal from 1997. She also obtained bronze in the Long distance World Championship in 2003.

=== Ski mountaineering ===
- 2004: 5th, Patrouille des Glaciers together with Lucia Näfen and Nathalie Etzensperger
- 2004: 10th (women ranking), Patrouille des Glaciers together with Andrea Salzmann and Bernarda Henzen
