= Emil Wingstedt =

Swedish orienteering competitor

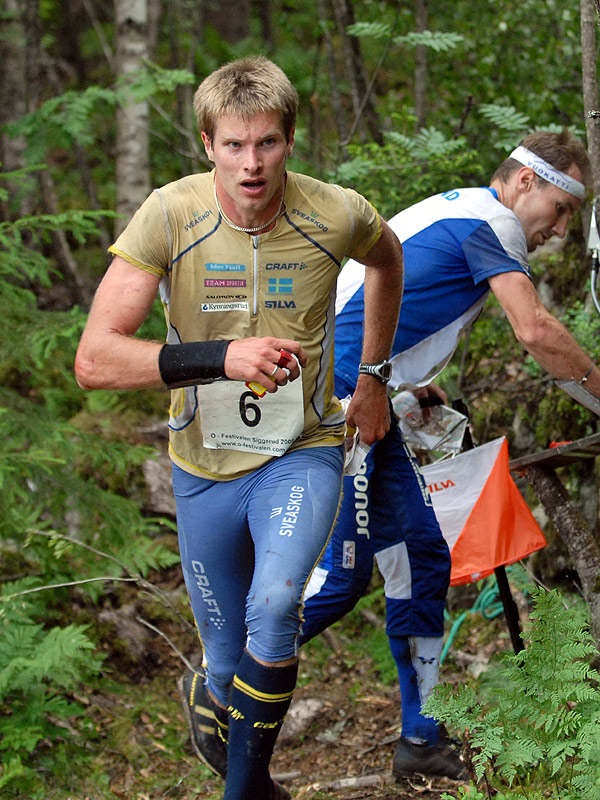
- Wingstedt in 2008

Personal information
- Nationality: Swedish
- Born: 9 May 1975 (age 51)

Sport
- Sport: Orienteering
Medal record
Men's orienteering
Representing Sweden
World Championships
Gold medal – first place	2003 Rapperswil/Jona	Relay
Gold medal – first place	2005 Aichi	Sprint
Gold medal – first place	2006 Aarhus	Sprint
Silver medal – second place	2007 Kiev	Relay
Bronze medal – third place	2003 Rapperswil/Jona	Long
Bronze medal – third place	2004 Västerås	Relay
Bronze medal – third place	2006 Aarhus	Relay
World Games
Bronze medal – third place	2001 Akita	Relay
European Championships
Gold medal – first place	2002 Sümeg	Sprint
Gold medal – first place	2004 Roskilde	Sprint
Gold medal – first place	2006 Otepää	Sprint
Gold medal – first place	2008 Ventspils	Sprint
Silver medal – second place	2002 Sümeg	Long
Silver medal – second place	2002 Sümeg	Relay
Bronze medal – third place	2004 Roskilde	Middle
Bronze medal – third place	2004 Roskilde	Long
Bronze medal – third place	2004 Roskilde	Relay
Bronze medal – third place	2008 Ventspils	Long
Bronze medal – third place	2010 Primorsko	Sprint

Emil Wingstedt (born 9 May 1975) is a Swedish orienteering competitor. He won the 2005 and 2006 Sprint World Orienteering Championships, and finished third on the long distance in 2003. He is Relay World Champion from 2003 with the Swedish team, as well as having a silver medal from 2007, and bronze medals from 2004 and 2006. He is a four-time European Champion, winning the Sprint distance in 2002, 2004, 2006 and 2008. He won the classical relay race Tiomila in 2006, 2007 and 2012 with his club team Halden SK.

He has been ranked no. 1 on the IOF (International Orienteering Federation) World Ranking (in 2001).
