= Svajūnas Ambrazas =

Lithuanian orienteering competitor (born 1967)

Medal record

Men's orienteering

Representing Lithuania

World Games
Silver medal – second place	2001 Akita	Relay

Svajūnas Ambrazas (born 20 February 1967) is a Lithuanian orienteering competitor.

He received a silver medal at the World Games in 2005 in the mixed relay, with Vilma Rudzenskaitė, Edgaras Voveris and Giedrė Voverienė, when the Lithuanian team finished second behind Norway.

His finished 14th in the short distance and 12th in the classic distance at the World Orienteering Championships in 1995. In 1999 he participated on the Lithuanian relay team that finished 6th. He was also a member of the Lithuanian relay team in the 2005 world championships, when they finished 6th.
