= Bjørnar Valstad =

Norwegian orienteer (born 1967)

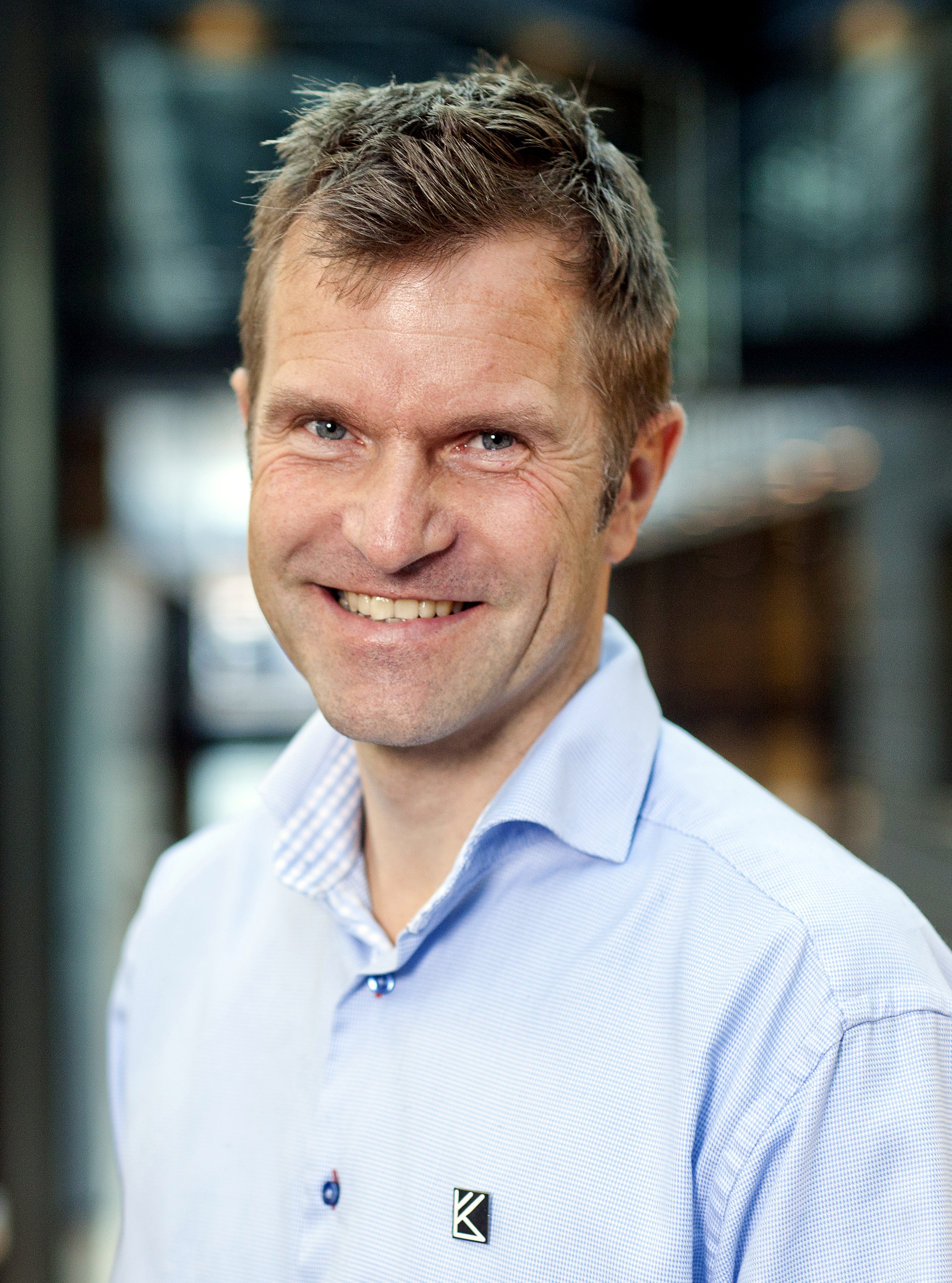
- Valstad in 2004

Personal information
- Nationality: Norwegian
- Born: 27 April 1967 (age 59) Stjørdal Municipality, Norway
- Home town: Nittedal Municipality, Norway
- Education: Norwegian University of Science and Technology
- Occupation: Head of department at Kuben
- Years active: 1985–2004
- Height: 178 cm (5 ft 10 in)

Sport
- Country: Norway
- Sport: Orienteering

Achievements and titles
- National finals: 12 national championships
Medal record
Men's orienteering
Representing Norway
World Championships
Gold medal – first place	1999 Inverness	Classic
Gold medal – first place	1999 Inverness	Relay
Gold medal – first place	2004 Västerås	Long
Gold medal – first place	2004 Västerås	Relay
Silver medal – second place	1991 Mariánské Lázně	Relay
Silver medal – second place	2001 Tampere	Relay
Silver medal – second place	2003 Rapperswil/Jona	Middle
Bronze medal – third place	1995 Detmold	Short
Bronze medal – third place	1997 Grimstad	Short
Bronze medal – third place	1997 Grimstad	Relay
World Games
Gold medal – first place	2001 Akita	Relay
- Updated on 1 August 2020

Bjørnar Valstad (born 27 April 1967) is a Norwegian former orienteering athlete who has won 4 World Orienteering Championships gold medals.

Valstad ran for the Norwegian club Bækkelagets SK in Oslo. He previously represented Nydalens SK, NTHI and IL Stjørdals-Blink. From 2007 to 2014 he was the secretary-general of the Norges Orienteringsforbund. He retired from international orienteering at the end of the 2004 season where he became world champion in both the long and relay events, despite this he failed to make the Orienteering World Cup final round in Germany. Valstad won the Jukola relay in 1995. 1999 and 2002.

He is married to former orienteering athlete Hanne Staff. They are living in Nittedal Municipality with their two daughters born 2006 and 2009.

Valstad got his degree in electrical engineering at the Norwegian University of Science and Technology Since 2014 Valstad is head of department for electrical engineering at Kuben Upper Secondary School in Oslo.

== Achievements ==
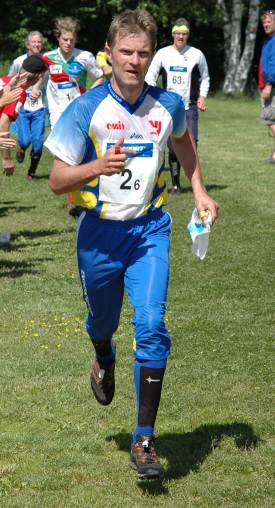
Valstad during a race in 2005

World Orienteering Championships

- Gold, Long Distance, 2004 Sweden
- Gold, Relay Event, 2004 Sweden
- Gold, Classic Distance, 1999 Great Britain
- Gold, Relay Event, 1999 Great Britain
- Silver, Middle Distance, 2003 Switzerland
- Silver, Relay Event, 2001 Finland
- Silver, Relay Event, 1991 Czechoslovakia
- Bronze, Short Distance, 1997 Norway
- Bronze, Relay Event, 1997 Norway
- Bronze, Short Distance, 1995 Germany

European Orienteering Championships

- Silver, Classic Distance, 2002 Hungary
- Bronze, Classic Distance, 2000 Ukraine

Orienteering World Cup

- First, Overall Individual World Cup 2002
- Third, Overall Individual World Cup 1998
- Gold, Classic Distance, 2002 Switzerland
- Gold, Sprint Distance, 2002 Norway
- Gold, Classic Distance, 1998 Ireland
- Silver, Short Distance, 2002 Sweden
- Silver, Classic Distance, 1998 Great Britain
- Silver, Classic Distance, 1998 Estonia
- Silver, Classic Distance, 1996 Lithuania
- Bronze, Classic Event, 2002 Czech Republic
- Bronze, Short Distance, 1998 Great Britain
- Bronze, Classic Distance, 1998 Poland
- Bronze, Short Distance, 1998 Finland

World Games

- Gold, Relay Event, 2001 Japan
