= Jenny Johansson =

Swedish orienteering competitor (born 1977)

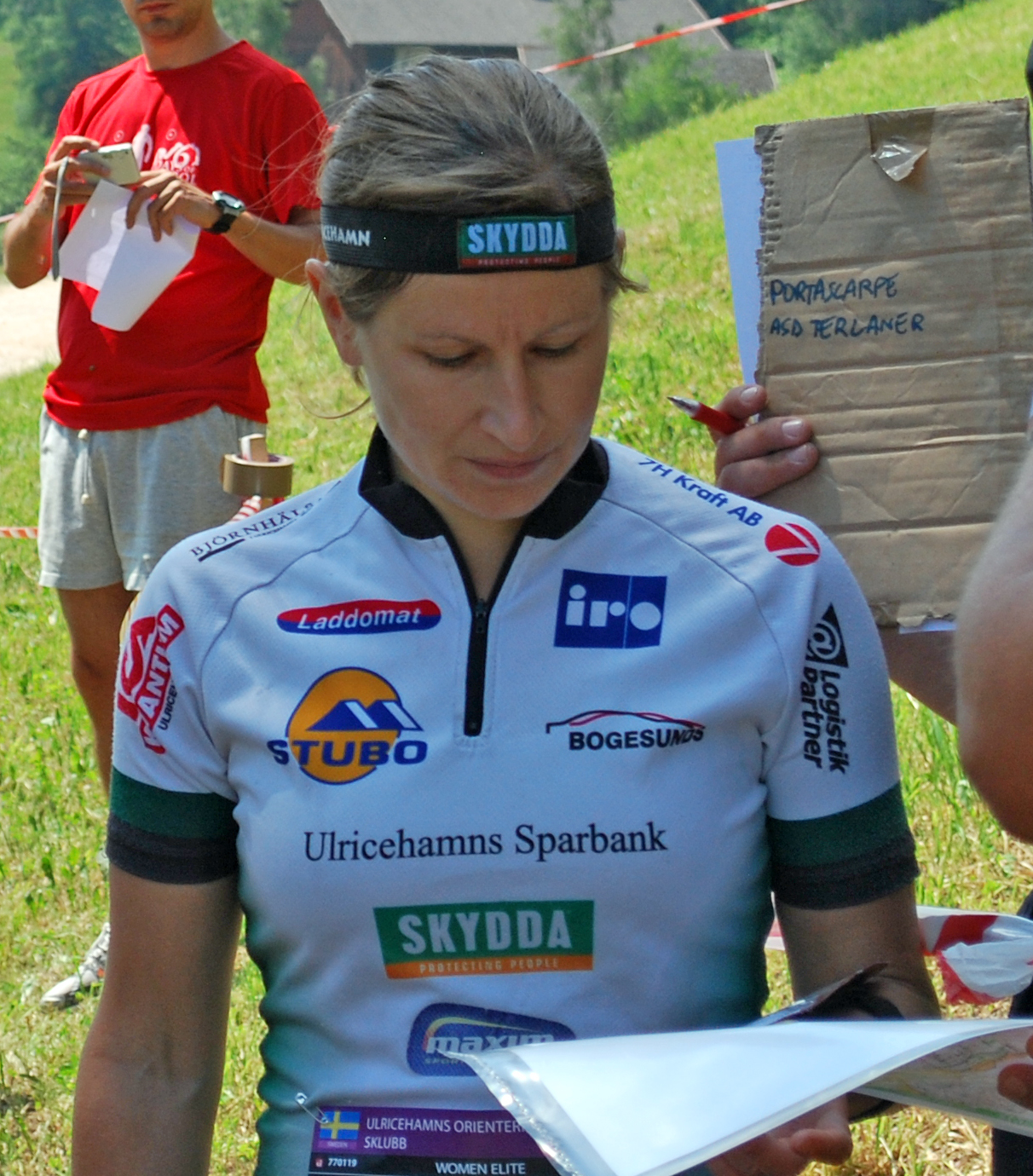

Medal record

Women's orienteering

Representing Sweden

World Championships
| Gold medal – first place | 2004 Västerås | Relay |
| Silver medal – second place | 2001 Tampere | Middle |
| Silver medal – second place | 2001 Tampere | Relay |
| Silver medal – second place | 2003 Rapperswil/Jona | Relay |
| Silver medal – second place | 2005 Aichi | Middle |
| Silver medal – second place | 2006 Aarhus | Relay |
| Bronze medal – third place | 2003 Rapperswil/Jona | Sprint |
| Bronze medal – third place | 2005 Aichi | Relay |

World Games
| Bronze medal – third place | 2001 Akita | Relay |

Junior World Championships
| Gold medal – first place | 1997 Leopoldsburg | Relay |

Jenny Johansson (born 15 January 1977) is a Swedish orienteering competitor. She is Relay World Champion as a member of the Swedish winning team in 2004, as well as having silver medals from 2001, 2003 and 2006, and bronze medal from 2005. She obtained silver in the Short distance World Championship in 2001 and Middle distance in 2005, and bronze in the Sprint distance in 2003.

She has two World Cup victories, one from 2000 and one 2005, in addition to several second places. She won gold medal in the 2000 European Orienteering Championships, Short distance, and also Relay gold medal in 2004.
