= 2003 World Orienteering Championships =

2003 edition of the World Orienteering Championships

- Host city: Rapperswil and Jona
- Country: Switzerland
- Events: 8

The 2003 World Orienteering Championships, the 20th World Orienteering Championships, were held in Rapperswil and Jona, Switzerland, 3 –9 August 2003.

The championships had eight events; sprint for men and women, middle distance for men and women, long distance (formerly called individual or classic distance) for men and women, and relays for men and women.

== Medalists ==
Event	Gold		Silver		Bronze
Men's sprint	Jamie Stevenson (GBR)	12:43.7	Rudolf Ropek (CZE)		Thierry Gueorgiou (FRA)
Women's sprint	Simone Luder (SUI)	13:21.3	Marie-Luce Romanens (SUI)		Jenny Johansson (SWE)
Men's middle distance	Thierry Gueorgiou (FRA)	30:08	Bjørnar Valstad (NOR)		Øystein Kristiansen (NOR)
Women's middle distance	Simone Luder (SUI)	32:40	Hanne Staff (NOR)		Heli Jukkola (FIN)
Men's long distance	Thomas Bührer (SUI)	1:48:20	Yuri Omeltchenko (UKR)		Emil Wingstedt (SWE)
Women's long distance	Simone Luder (SUI)	1:26:14	Karolina Arewång-Höjsgaard (SWE)		Brigitte Wolf (SUI)
Men's relay	Sweden (SWE): Niclas Jonasson; Mattias Karlsson; Emil Wingstedt	1:58:42	Finland (FIN): Jani Lakanen; Jarkko Huovila; Mats Haldin		Great Britain (GBR): Daniel Marston; Jon Duncan; Jamie Stevenson
Women's relay	Switzerland (SUI): Brigitte Wolf; Vroni König-Salmi; Simone Luder	1:57:41	Sweden (SWE): Gunilla Svärd; Karolina Arewång-Höjsgaard; Jenny Johansson	1:59:46	Norway (NOR): Elisabeth Ingvaldsen; Birgitte Husebye; Hanne Staff

== Results ==
=== Women's long distance ===
WOC 2003 – Long – Women
Rank	Competitor	Nation	Time
1st place, gold medalist(s)	Simone Luder	Switzerland	1:26:14
2nd place, silver medalist(s)	Karolina Arewång Höjsgaard	Sweden	1:29:19
3rd place, bronze medalist(s)	Brigitte Wolf	Switzerland	1:32:52
4	Emma Engstrand	Sweden	1:33:59
5	Sara Gemperle	Switzerland	1:34:28
6	Barbara Bączek	Poland	1:34:31
7	Hanne Staff	Norway	1:34:57
8	Marianne Andersen	Norway	1:36:17
9	Karin Schmalfeld	Germany	1:36:28
10	Martina Rakayova	Slovakia	1:36:29
11	Dana Brožková	Czech Republic	1:36:50
12	Yulia Novikova	Russia	1:36:52
13	Terhi Holster	Finland	1:37:28
14	Heather Monro	Great Britain	1:38:36
15	Zsuzsa Fey	Romania	1:40:00
16	Marta Štěrbová	Czech Republic	1:40:21
