= Giedrė Voverienė =

Lithuanian orienteering competitor (born 1968)

Medal record

Women's orienteering

Representing Lithuania

World Games
| Silver medal – second place | 2001 Akita | Relay |

European Championships
| Bronze medal – third place | 2002 Sümeg | Relay |

Vilnius Marathon
| Silver medal – second place | 2004 Vilnius | Marathon |

Giedrė Voverienė (born 5 February 1968 in Vilnius) is a Lithuanian orienteering competitor. She received a bronze medal in relay at the 2002 European Orienteering Championships in Sümeg, together with Vilma Rudzenskaitė and Ieva Sargautytė. The same team finished 4th at the 2003 World Orienteering Championships in Rapperswil-Jona.

Voveriene finished 5th in the short distance at the 2000 European championships in Truskavets.
