= Vilma Rudzenskaitė =

Lithuanian orienteering competitor (born 1966)

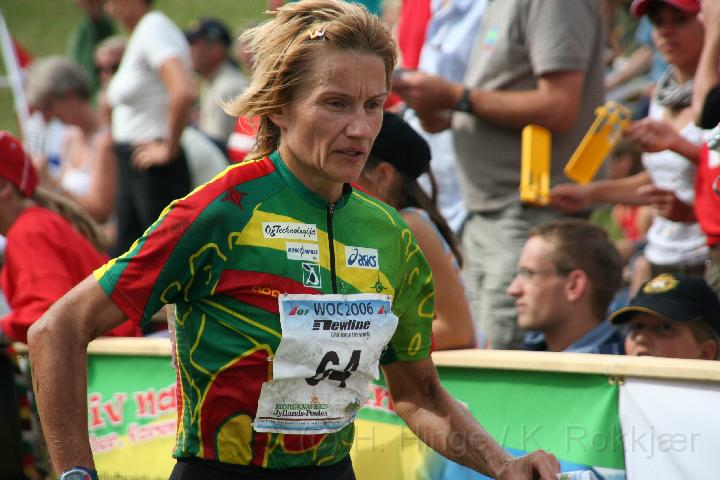
- Rudzenskaitė at WOC 2006

Medal record

Women's orienteering

Representing Lithuania

World Games
Silver medal – second place	2001 Akita	Relay

European Championships
Bronze medal – third place	2002 Sümeg	Relay

Vilma Rudzenskaitė (born December 13, 1966) is a Lithuanian orienteering competitor. She received a bronze medal in relay at the 2002 European Orienteering Championships in Sümeg, together with Giedrė Voverienė and Ieva Sargautytė. The same Lithuanian team finished 4th at the 2003 World Orienteering Championships in Rapperswil-Jona.
