= 2013 in sports =

2013 in sports is listing and describing the major sporting events from the current year: by month and by discipline. The year after the 2012 Summer Olympics and the year before the 2014 Winter Olympics.

== Calendar by month ==
=== January ===
Date	Sport	Venue/Event	Status	Winner/s
2–6	Squash	(England) 2012 PSA and WSA World Series Finals	International	(Egypt) Amr Shabana / (Malaysia) Nicol David
4 – 22 September	Golf	(United States) 2013 PGA Tour	Domestic	Money leader and most tournaments won: (United States) Tiger Woods; FedEx Cup winner: (Sweden) Henrik Stenson
5–13	Darts	(United Kingdom) 2013 BDO World Darts Championship	International	(England) Scott Waites / (Russia) Anastasia Dobromyslova
5–18	Association football	(Bahrain) 21st Arabian Gulf Cup	Regional	United Arab Emirates
5–19	Auto racing	(Peru) (Argentina) (Chile) 2013 Dakar Rally	International	(France) Cyril Despres (bikes) (Argentina) Marcos Patronelli (quads) (France) Stéphane Peterhansel / Jean-Paul Cottret (cars) (Russia) Eduard Nikolaev / Sergey Savostin / Vladimir Rybakov (trucks)
7	American football	(United States) 2013 BCS National Championship Game	Domestic	University of Alabama
10–13	Curling	(Canada) 2013 Continental Cup of Curling	International	(Canada) / (United States) North America
11–27	Handball	(Spain) 2013 World Men's Handball Championship	International	Spain
14–27	Tennis	(Australia) 2013 Australian Open	International	(Serbia) Novak Djokovic / (Belarus) Victoria Azarenka
14 – 10 February	Field hockey	2013 Hockey India League	Domestic	(India) Ranchi Rhinos
15–20	WRC	(Monaco) 81ème Rallye Automobile de Monte-Carlo	International	(France) Sébastien Loeb / (Monaco) Daniel Elena
18–24	Squash	(United States) Tournament of Champions 2013	International	(Egypt) Ramy Ashour
18–27	Association football	(Costa Rica) 2013 Copa Centroamericana	Regional	Costa Rica
19	Mixed martial arts	(Brazil) UFC on FX: Belfort vs. Bisping	International	(Brazil) Vitor Belfort
19 – 10 February	Association football	(South Africa) 2013 Africa Cup of Nations	Continental	Nigeria
19 – 27 April	Ice hockey	(United States) / (Canada) 2012–13 NHL season	Domestic	Presidents' Trophy and Clarence S. Campbell Bowl (Western Conference (NHL)) winner: (Illinois) Chicago Blackhawks; Prince of Wales Trophy (Eastern Conference (NHL)) winner: (Massachusetts) Boston Bruins
20	Marathon	(India) Mumbai Marathon	International	(Uganda) Jackson Kiprop / (Ethiopia) Valentine Kipketer
21–27	Figure skating	(Croatia) 2013 European Figure Skating Championships	Continental	Men: (Spain) Javier Fernández; Ladies: (Italy) Carolina Kostner; Pairs: (Russia) Tatiana Volosozhar / Maxim Trankov; Ice dance: (Russia) Ekaterina Bobrova / Dmitri Soloviev
22–27	Road cycling	(Australia) 2013 Tour Down Under	International	(Netherlands) Tom-Jelte Slagter
22 – 24 July	Association football	2013 Copa Libertadores	Continental	(Brazil) Atlético Mineiro
23–27	Curling	(Canada) 2013 The National	International	(Canada) Jeff Stoughton (skip)
25	Marathon	(United Arab Emirates) Dubai Marathon	International	(Ethiopia) Lelisa Desisa / Tsegayae Beyene
26	Mixed martial arts	(United States) UFC on Fox: Johnson vs. Dodson	International	(United States) Demetrious Johnson
29 – 5 February	Multi-sport	(South Korea) 2013 Special Olympics World Winter Games	International	Note: See Multi-sport events section below
31 – 17 February	Cricket	(India) 2013 Women's Cricket World Cup	International	Australia

=== February ===
Date	Sport	Venue/Event	Status	Winner/s
1–7	Baseball	(Mexico) 2013 Caribbean Series	Regional	(Mexico) Yaquis de Obregón
1 – 17 November	Tennis	2013 Davis Cup World Group	International	Czech Republic
1–13	Cricket	West Indian cricket team in Australia in 2012–13	International	Australia (ODIs) / West Indies (T20)
1 – 24 March	Cricket	Pakistani cricket team in South Africa in 2012–13	International	South Africa (Tests), Pakistan (T20s)
2	Mixed martial arts	(United States) UFC 156: Aldo vs. Edgar	International	(Brazil) José Aldo
2 – 13 April	Basketball	2013 FIBA Americas League	Continental	(Brazil) EC Pinheiros
2	Cycling	(United States) 2013 UCI Cyclo-cross World Championships	International	Men's elite race: (Belgium) Sven Nys; Women's elite race: (Netherlands) Marianne Vos
2 – 16 March	Rugby union	2013 Six Nations Championship	Continental	Wales
3	American football	(United States) Super Bowl XLVII	Domestic	(Maryland) Baltimore Ravens
4–17	Alpine skiing	(Austria) FIS Alpine World Ski Championships 2013	International	United States
5–12	Figure skating	(Japan) 2013 Four Continents Figure Skating Championships	International	Men: (Canada) Kevin Reynolds; Ladies: (Japan) Mao Asada; Pairs: (Canada) Meagan Duhamel / Eric Radford; Ice dance: (United States) Meryl Davis / Charlie White
7–17	Biathlon	(Czech Republic) Biathlon World Championships 2013	International	Norway
8–10	WRC	61st Rally Sweden	International	(France) Sébastien Ogier/Julien Ingrassia
9 – 26 March	Cricket	English cricket team in New Zealand in 2012–13	International	England (T20s, ODIs)
9 – 9 November	Association football	2013 AFC Champions League	Continental	(China) Guangzhou Evergrande F.C.
9 – 3 November	Tennis	2013 Fed Cup World Group	International	Italy
11–17	Tennis	2013 Qatar Total Open	International	(Belarus) Victoria Azarenka
15 – 13 July	Rugby union	(Australia) / (New Zealand) / (South Africa) 2013 Super Rugby season	Regional	Top of league table: (New Zealand) Chiefs
16–17	Speed skating	(Norway) 2013 World Allround Speed Skating Championships	International	(Netherlands) Sven Kramer/ Ireen Wüst
16–24	Curling	(Canada) 2013 Scotties Tournament of Hearts	Domestic	Ontario (Rachel Homan, skip)
16 – 17 November	Auto racing	(United States) 2013 NASCAR Sprint Cup Series	Domestic	(California) Jimmie Johnson ( (North Carolina) Hendrick Motorsports, (United States) Chevrolet)
20–24	Track cycling	(Belarus) 2013 UCI Track Cycling World Championships	International	United Kingdom
20 – 3 March	Nordic skiing	(Italy) FIS Nordic World Ski Championships 2013	International	Norway
20 – 17 April	Ice hockey	(Russia) / (Belarus) / (Czech Republic) / (Kazakhstan) / (Latvia) / (Slovakia) / (Ukraine) 2013 Gagarin Cup playoffs	Regional	(Russia) Dynamo Moscow
22 – 26 March	Cricket	Australian cricket team in India in 2012–13	International	India
22 – 26 March	Cricket	(Cricket West Indies) Zimbabwean cricket team in the West Indies in 2012–13	International	West Indies (ODIs, T20)
24	NASCAR	(United States) 2013 Daytona 500	Domestic	(California) Jimmie Johnson ( (North Carolina) Hendrick Motorsports, (United States) Chevrolet)
24	Athletics	(Japan) 2013 Tokyo Marathon	International	(Kenya) Dennis Kimetto / (Ethiopia) Aberu Kebede
25 – 2 March	Squash	(United States) North American Open 2013	International	(Egypt) Ramy Ashour
28 – 8 December	Auto racing	(Australia) / (New Zealand) / (United States) 2013 International V8 Supercars Championship	International	Drivers' Championship: (Australia) Jamie Whincup; Pirtek Endurance Cup: (Australia) Craig Lowndes / Warren Luff; Teams Championship: (Australia) Triple Eight Race Engineering

=== March ===
Date	Sport	Venue/Event	Status	Winner/s
1–3	Athletics	(Sweden) 2013 European Athletics Indoor Championships	Continental	Russia
2–10	Curling	(Canada) 2013 Tim Hortons Brier	Domestic	Northern Ontario (Brad Jacobs, skip)
2–19	Baseball	(Chinese Taipei) / (Japan) / (Puerto Rico) / (United States) 2013 World Baseball Classic	International	Dominican Republic
2 – 8 September	Rugby league	(England) / (France) Super League XVIII	Regional	See this section for the final eight in the playoffs
2 – 27 October	Association football	(United States) / (Canada) 2013 Major League Soccer season	Domestic	See the playoff bracket section here.
3–10	Road cycling	(France) 2013 Paris–Nice	International	(Australia) Richie Porte
3–17	Multi-sport	(Costa Rica) 2013 Central American Games	International	Guatemala
4–17	Tennis	(United States) 2013 BNP Paribas Open	International	(Spain) Rafael Nadal / (Russia) Maria Sharapova
6–12	Road cycling	(Italy) 2013 Tirreno–Adriatico	International	(Italy) Vincenzo Nibali
6–13	Association football	(Portugal) 2013 Algarve Cup	International	United States
7 – 9 September	Rugby league	(Australia) / (New Zealand) 2013 NRL season	Domestic	See this section for the final eight in the playoffs
8–10	WRC	(Mexico) 27º Rally México	International	(France) Sébastien Ogier/Julien Ingrassia
8–10	Short track speed skating	(Hungary) 2013 World Short Track Speed Skating Championships	International	South Korea
8–14	Squash	Kuwait PSA Cup 2013	International	(Egypt) Ramy Ashour
9–10	Volleyball	(Turkey) CEV Women's Champions League	Continental	(Turkey) VakıfBank
10–17	Figure skating	(Canada) 2013 World Figure Skating Championships	International	Men: (Canada) Patrick Chan; Ladies: (South Korea) Kim Yuna; Pairs: (Russia) Tatiana Volosozhar / Maxim Trankov; Ice dance: (United States) Meryl Davis / Charlie White
15–24	Ice hockey	(United States) 2013 NCAA National Collegiate Women's Ice Hockey Tournament	Domestic	University of Minnesota
15–10 November	Association football	(Norway) 2013 Tippeligaen	Domestic	Strømsgodset
16–24	Curling	(Latvia) 2013 World Women's Curling Championship	International	Scotland (Eve Muirhead, skip)
16–17	Volleyball	(Russia) CEV Champions League	Continental	(Russia) Novosibirsk
17	Road cycling	(Italy) 2013 Milan–San Remo	International	(Germany) Gerald Ciolek
17	Formula One	(Australia) 2013 Australian Grand Prix	International	(Finland) Kimi Räikkönen ( (United Kingdom) Lotus–Renault)
18–24	Road cycling	(Spain) 2013 Volta a Catalunya	International	Dan Martin (IRL)
18–31	Tennis	(United States) 2013 Sony Open Tennis	International	(United Kingdom) Andy Murray / (United States) Serena Williams
19 – 8 April	Basketball	(United States) 2013 NCAA Division I Men's Basketball Tournament	Domestic	(Kentucky) University of Louisville
22	Road cycling	(Belgium) 2013 E3 Harelbeke	International	Fabian Cancellara (SUI)
22 – 1 September	Australian rules football	(Australia) 2013 AFL season	Domestic	Minor premiers: (Victoria (state)) Hawthorn
22-7 September	Association Football	(United States) 2013 USL Pro season	International	(Florida) Orlando City
22 – 24	IndyCar Series	(United States) Honda Grand Prix of St. Petersburg	International	(Canada) James Hinchcliffe
23	Motorcycle speedway	2013 Speedway Grand Prix of New Zealand	International	(Poland) Jarosław Hampel
23 – 9 April	Basketball	(United States) 2013 NCAA Division I Women's Basketball Tournament	Domestic	University of Connecticut
24	Formula One	(Malaysia) 2013 Malaysian Grand Prix	International	(Germany) Sebastian Vettel ( (Austria) Red Bull–Renault)
24	WTCC	2013 FIA WTCC Race of Italy	International	(France) Yvan Muller ( (United States) Chevrolet) (2)
24	Road cycling	(Belgium) 2013 Gent–Wevelgem	International	Peter Sagan (SVK)
24	Athletics	(Poland) 2013 IAAF World Cross Country Championships	International	(Kenya) Japhet Kipyegon Korir / Emily Chebet
25–29	Multi-sport	(France) 2013 CSIM World Winter Games	International	France
27–31	Squash	(Malaysia) Kuala Lumpur Open 2013	International	(England) Laura Massaro
27–31	Rink hockey	(Switzerland) 65th Nations Cup	International	Portugal
29 – 13 April	Ice hockey	(United States) 2013 NCAA Division I Men's Ice Hockey Tournament	Domestic	(Connecticut) Yale University
30	Horse racing	(United Arab Emirates) 2013 Dubai World Cup	International	(United States) Animal Kingdom (jockey: (Dominican Republic) Joel Rosario; trainer: (United States) Graham Motion)
30 – 7 April	Curling	(Canada) 2013 Ford World Men's Curling Championship	International	Sweden (Niklas Edin, skip)
31	Road cycling	(Belgium) 2013 Tour of Flanders	International	Fabian Cancellara (SUI)
31 – 29 September	Baseball	(United States) / (Canada) 2013 Major League Baseball season	Domestic	See this section for the postseason bracket.

=== April ===
Date	Sport	Venue/Event	Status	Winner/s
1–6	Road cycling	(Spain) 2013 Tour of the Basque Country	International	Nairo Quintana (COL)
2–9	Ice hockey	(Canada) 2013 IIHF Women's World Championship	International	United States
3 – 26 May	Cricket	(India) 2013 Indian Premier League	Domestic	Mumbai Indians
4–7	Golf	(United States) 2013 Kraft Nabisco Championship	International	(South Korea) Inbee Park
4–11	Rally raid	Abu Dhabi Desert Challenge	International	(Spain) Nani Roma/ (France) Michel Perin (Mini) (Spain) Marc Coma (KTM)
6	Horse racing	(United Kingdom) 2013 Grand National	Regional	(Republic of Ireland) Auroras Encore (jockey: (United Kingdom) Ryan Mania; trainer: (United Kingdom) Sue Smith)
7	Grand Prix motorcycle racing	2013 Qatar motorcycle Grand Prix	International	MotoGP: (Spain) Jorge Lorenzo (Yamaha); Moto2: (Spain) Pol Espargaró (Kalex); Moto3: (Spain) Luis Salom (KTM)
7	Road cycling	(France) 2013 Paris–Roubaix	International	Fabian Cancellara (SUI)
7	WTCC	2013 FIA WTCC Race of Morocco	International	(Denmark) Michel Nykjær ( (United States) Chevrolet) (Spain) Pepe Oriola ( (Spain) SEAT)
8–14	Weightlifting	(Albania) 2013 European Weightlifting Championships	Continental	Russia
11–14	WRC	47º Vodafone Rally de Portugal	International	(France) Sébastien Ogier ( (Germany) Volkswagen) (France) Julien Ingrassia
11–14	Figure skating	(Japan) 2013 ISU World Team Trophy in Figure Skating	International	United States
11–14	Golf	(United States) 2013 Masters Tournament	International	(Australia) Adam Scott
13	Basketball	(Belgium) 2013 Eurocup Final	Continental	(Russia) PBC Lokomotiv Kuban
13	ELMS	(United Kingdom) 3 Hours of Silverstone	International	(United Kingdom) No. 38 Jota Sport (United Kingdom) Simon Dolan/ (United Kingdom) Oliver Turvey
13–14	Formula 3	(United Kingdom) Round 2 Silverstone	International	(United Kingdom) Harry Tincknell (Sweden) Felix Rosenqvist (United Kingdom) Harry Tincknell
13–20	Curling	(Canada) 2013 World Senior Curling Championships	International	Men: (Canada) Rob Armitage (skip); Women: (Canada) Cathy King (skip)
13–20	Curling	(Canada) 2013 World Mixed Doubles Curling Championship	International	(Hungary) Zsolt Kiss / Dorottya Palancsa
13–21	Tennis	(Monaco) 2013 Monte-Carlo Rolex Masters	International	(Serbia) Novak Djokovic
14	Formula 1	(China) 2013 Chinese Grand Prix	International	(Spain) Fernando Alonso ( (Italy) Ferrari)
14	Road cycling	(Netherlands) 2013 Amstel Gold Race	International	(Czech Republic) Roman Kreuziger
14	Road cycling	(Spain) Vuelta a Castilla y León	International	(Spain) Rubén Plaza
14	Blancpain Endurance Series	(Italy) Round 1-Monza	International	(Brazil) César Ramos ( (Italy) Ferrari 458 GT3) (Spain) Davide Rigon & (Italy) Daniel Zampieri
14	WEC	(United Kingdom) 6 Hours of Silverstone	International	(United Kingdom) Allan McNish ( (Germany) No. 2 Audi) (Denmark) Tom Kristensen (France) Loïc Duval
14	Superbikes	(Spain) R2: Arágon	International	(United Kingdom) Chaz Davies (2R Superbikes) (France) Fabien Foret (Supersport) (France) Sylvain Barrier (Superstock 1000)
14	FIM MX	(Italy) R4: Arco di Trento	International	(Italy) Antonio Cairoli (MX1) (Netherlands) Jeffrey Herlings (MX2)
14–20	Ice hockey	(Hungary) 2013 IIHF World Championship Division I – Group A	International	Kazakhstan and Italy are promoted to Elite Group; Great Britain is relegated to Division I – Group B
14–20	Ice hockey	(Ukraine) 2013 IIHF World Championship Division I – Group B	International	Ukraine is promoted to Division I – Group A Estonia is relegated to Division II – Group A
14–20	Ice hockey	(Croatia) 2013 IIHF World Championship Division II – Group A	International	Croatia is promoted to Division I – Group B Spain is relegated to Division II – Group B
15	Athletics	(United States) 2013 Boston Marathon (See note)	International	Lelisa Desisa (ETH)/Rita Jeptoo (KEN)
15–21	Ice hockey	(South Africa) 2013 IIHF World Championship Division III – Group A	International	The United Arab Emirates and Greece are promoted to Division III; South Africa is promoted to Division II – Group B
16–21	Curling	(Canada) 2013 Players' Championship	International	Men: (Ontario) Glenn Howard (skip); Women: (Scotland) Eve Muirhead (skip)
17	Road cycling	(Belgium) 2013 La Flèche Wallonne	International	(Spain) Daniel Moreno
17–21	Artistic gymnastics	(Russia) European Women's Artistic Gymnastics Championships	Continental	Aliya Mustafina (RUS)
17–21	Artistic gymnastics	(Russia) European Men's Artistic Gymnastics Championships	Continental	David Belyavskiy (RUS)
18–22	Amateur wrestling	(India) 2013 Asian Wrestling Championships	Continental	South Korea
18–28	Ice hockey	(Russia) 2013 IIHF World U18 Championships	International	Canada
19–20	Judo	(Costa Rica) 2013 Pan American Judo Championships	Continental	Brazil
19–21	Judo	(Thailand) 2013 Asian Judo Championships	Continental	Japan
20	Motorcycle speedway	(Poland) 2013 Speedway Grand Prix of Europe	International	Emil Saytfudinov (RUS)
21	Formula 1	2013 Bahrain Grand Prix	International	(Germany) Sebastian Vettel ( (Austria) Red Bull–Renault)
21	Athletics	(England) 2013 London Marathon	International	Tsegaye Kebede (ETH) / Priscah Jeptoo (KEN)
21	Road cycling	(Belgium) 2013 Liège–Bastogne–Liège	International	Daniel Martin (IRL)
21	Grand Prix motorcycle racing	(United States) 2013 Motorcycle Grand Prix of the Americas	International	MotoGP: (Spain) Marc Márquez (Honda); Moto2: (Spain) Nicolás Terol (Suter); Moto3: (Spain) Álex Rins (KTM)
21–27	Ice hockey	(Turkey) 2013 IIHF World Championship Division II – Group B	International	Israel is promoted to Division II – Group A Bulgaria is relegated to Division III
23–28	Road cycling	(Switzerland) 2013 Tour de Romandie	International	(United Kingdom) Chris Froome
24 – 5 May	Tennis	2013 Portugal Open	International	(Switzerland) Stan Wawrinka (Russia) Anastasia Pavlyuchenkova
25–27	American football	(United States) 2013 NFL draft	Domestic	#1 pick: Eric Fisher, Central Michigan University ( (Missouri) Kansas City Chiefs)
25–27	ERC	(Portugal) 2013 Rally Azores	International	(Czech Republic) Jan Kopecký
25–28	Judo	(Hungary) 2013 European Judo Championships	Continental	Georgia
26–27	Handball	(New Zealand) 2013 Women's Oceania Handball Championship	Continental	Australia
27–28	World Series by Renault	(Spain) Round 2 Aragón	International	(Denmark) Kevin Magnussen (Colombia) Carlos Huertas
28	Futsal	(European Union) 2012–13 UEFA Futsal Cup	Continental	(Kazakhstan) AFC Kairat
28	FIA European Rallycross Championship	(Portugal) Round 2: Montalegre	Continental	(United Kingdom) Liam Doran
28	Superbikes	(Netherlands) R3: Assen	International	(United Kingdom) Tom Sykes & (Republic of Ireland) Eugene Laverty (Superbikes) (United Kingdom) Sam Lowes (Supersport) (Italy) Eddi La Marra (Superstock 1000)
28	WTCC	2013 FIA WTCC Race of Slovakia	International	(Italy) Gabriele Tarquini (Honda Civic) (Netherlands) Tom Coronel (BMW 320 TC)

=== May ===
Date	Sport	Venue/Event	Status	Winner/s
3–5	WRC	2013 Rally Argentina	International	(France) Sébastien Loeb ( (France) Citroën DS3 WRC) (Monaco) Daniel Elena
3–19	Ice hockey	(Sweden) / (Finland) 2013 IIHF World Championship	International	Sweden
4	WEC	(Belgium) 6 Hours of Spa-Francorchamps	International	(Germany) André Lotterer (France) Benoît Tréluyer (Switzerland) Marcel Fässler
4	Horse racing	(United States) 2013 Kentucky Derby	Domestic	(United States) Orb (jockey: (Dominican Republic) Joel Rosario, trainer: (United States) Shug McGaughey)
4	Motorcycle speedway	2013 Speedway Grand Prix of Sweden	International	(Russia) Emil Sayfutdinov
4–26	Road cycling	(Italy) 2013 Giro d'Italia	International	(Italy) Vincenzo Nibali ( (Kazakhstan) Team Astana)
5	Grand Prix motorcycle racing	(Spain) 2013 Spanish motorcycle Grand Prix	International	MotoGP: (Spain) Dani Pedrosa (Honda RC213V); Moto2: (Spain) Esteve Rabat (Kalex); Moto3: (Spain) Maverick Viñales (KTM)
5	FIM Motocross World Championship	Portugal MX Grand Prix	International	(France) Gautier Paulin
5	WTCC	2013 FIA WTCC Race of Hungary	International	(France) Yvan Muller ( (United States) Chevrolet) (United Kingdom) Robert Huff ( (Spain) SEAT)
6–12	Tennis	(Spain) Mutua Madrid Open	International	Men: (Spain) Rafael Nadal; Women: (United States) Serena Williams
10–12	International GT Open	R2: Portugal	International	Race 1: (Portugal) Miguel Ramos & (Netherlands) Nicky Pastorelli (SGT), (Portugal) César Campaniço & (Portugal) Carlos Vieira (GTS); Race 2: (United Kingdom) Duncan Cameron & (Republic of Ireland) Matt Griffin (SGT), (Spain) Pol Rosell & (Russia) Roman Mavlanov (GTS)
11–12	Basketball	(United Kingdom) 2013 Euroleague Final Four	Continental	(Greece) Olympiacos Piraeus
12	Formula One	(Spain) 2013 Spanish Grand Prix	International	(Spain) Fernando Alonso ( (Italy) Ferrari)
12	European Hill Climb Championship	(Portugal) Rampa da Falperra	International	(Italy) Simone Faggioli ( (Italy) Osella FA 30)
12	Superbikes	(Italy) R4: Monza	International	(Italy) Marco Melandri & (Republic of Ireland) Eugene Laverty (Superbikes) (United Kingdom) Sam Lowes (Supersport) (Italy) Lorenzo Savadori (Superstock 1000)
12–19	Tennis	(Italy) Internazionali BNL d'Italia	International	Men: (Spain) Rafael Nadal; Women: (United States) Serena Williams
13–20	Table tennis	(France) 2013 World Table Tennis Championships	International	(China) Zhang Jike / (China) Li Xiaoxia
15	Association football	(Netherlands) 2013 UEFA Europa League Final	Continental	(England) Chelsea
17	Rugby union	(Ireland) 2013 European Challenge Cup Final	Continental	(Ireland) Leinster
18	Horse racing	(United States) 2013 Preakness Stakes	Domestic	(United States) Oxbow (jockey: (United States) Gary Stevens, trainer: (United States) D. Wayne Lukas)
18	Motorcycle speedway	2013 Speedway Grand Prix of Czech Republic	International	(United Kingdom) Tai Woffinden
18	Rugby union	(Ireland) 2013 Heineken Cup Final	Continental	(France) Toulon
19	Grand Prix motorcycle racing	(France) 2013 French motorcycle Grand Prix	International	MotoGP: (Spain) Dani Pedrosa (Honda RC213V); Moto2: (United Kingdom) Scott Redding (Kalex); Moto3: (Spain) Maverick Viñales (KTM)
19	WTCC	2013 FIA WTCC Race of Austria	International	(Denmark) Michel Nykjær ( (United States) Chevrolet) (United Kingdom) James Nash ( (United States) Chevrolet)
20–26	Squash	(United Kingdom) 2013 PSA & WSA British Open	International	(Egypt) Ramy Ashour / (England) Laura Massaro
23	Association football	(England) 2013 UEFA Women's Champions League Final	Continental	(Germany) Wolfsburg
25	Rugby union	(England) 2013 English Premiership Final	Domestic	(England) Leicester Tigers
25	Rugby union	(Ireland) 2013 Pro 12 Final	Continental	(Ireland) Leinster
25	Association football	(England) 2013 UEFA Champions League Final	Continental	(Germany) Bayern Munich
26	Formula One	2013 Monaco Grand Prix	International	(Germany) Nico Rosberg ( (Germany) Mercedes)
26	IndyCar Series	(United States) 2013 Indianapolis 500	International	(Brazil) Tony Kanaan ( (United States) KV Racing Technology, Chevrolet)
26 – 9 June	Tennis	(France) 2013 French Open	International	Men: (Spain) Rafael Nadal; Women: (United States) Serena Williams
27 – 1 June	Multi-sport	(Luxembourg) 2013 Games of the Small States of Europe	Continental	Luxembourg
28 – 9 June	Rugby union	(Chile) 2013 IRB Junior World Rugby Trophy	International	Italy
31 – 2 June	Rhythmic gymnastics	(Austria) 2013 Rhythmic Gymnastics European Championships	Continental	Russia
31 – 2 June	WRC	(Greece) 2013 Acropolis Rally	International	(Finland) Jari-Matti Latvala ( (Germany) Volkswagen Polo R WRC) (Finland) Miikka Anttila
31 – 21 July	Volleyball	(Argentina) 2013 FIVB Volleyball World League	International	Russia

=== June ===
Date	Sport	Venue/Event	Status	Winner/s
1	Horse racing	(United Kingdom) 2013 Epsom Derby	Domestic	(Republic of Ireland) Ruler of the World (jockey: (United Kingdom) Ryan Moore, trainer: (Republic of Ireland) Aidan O'Brien)
1	Motorcycle speedway	(United Kingdom) 2013 Speedway Grand Prix of Great Britain	International	(Russia) Emil Sayfutdinov
1	Rugby union	(France) 2013 Top 14 Final	Domestic	(France) Castres Olympique
1–2	Roller hockey	(Portugal) CERH European League Final Four	European	(Portugal) SL Benfica
1–8	Handball	(Dominican Republic) 2013 Pan American Women's Handball Championship	Continental	Brazil
1 – 6 July	Rugby union	2013 British & Irish Lions tour to Australia	International	Test series: Lions win 2–1
2	Grand Prix motorcycle racing	(Italy) 2013 Italian motorcycle Grand Prix	International	MotoGP: (Spain) Jorge Lorenzo (Yamaha); Moto2: (United Kingdom) Scott Redding (Kalex); Moto3: (Spain) Luis Salom (KTM)
2–9	Road cycling	(France) 2013 Critérium du Dauphiné	International	(United Kingdom) Chris Froome (Team Sky)
4–9	Fencing	(China) 2013 Asian Fencing Championships	Continental	South Korea
5–8	Rhythmic gymnastics	(Uzbekistan) 2013 Asian Rhythmic Gymnastics Championships	Continental	China
5–23	Rugby union	(France) 2013 IRB Junior World Championship	International	England
6–9	Golf	(United States) 2013 LPGA Championship	International	(South Korea) Inbee Park
6–20	Basketball	(United States) 2013 NBA Finals	Domestic	(Florida) Miami Heat
6–23	Cricket	(England) / (Wales) 2013 ICC Champions Trophy	International	India
8–16	Road cycling	(Switzerland) 2013 Tour de Suisse	International	(Portugal) Rui Costa (Movistar Team)
8	Horse racing	(United States) 2013 Belmont Stakes	Domestic	(United States) Palace Malice (jockey: (United States) Mike Smith, trainer: (United States) Todd Pletcher)
9	WTCC	2013 FIA WTCC Race of Russia	International	(France) Yvan Muller ( (United Kingdom) RML Group) (Denmark) Michel Nykjær ( (Sweden) NIKA Racing)
9	Formula One	(Canada) 2013 Canadian Grand Prix	International	(Germany) Sebastian Vettel ( (Austria) Red Bull-Renault)
9	Superbikes	(Portugal) R4: Algarve	International	(Italy) Marco Melandri & (Republic of Ireland) Eugene Laverty (Superbikes) (United Kingdom) Sam Lowes (Supersport) (France) Sylvain Barrier (Superstock 1000)
9–15	Squash	(France) 2013 WSF Men's World Team Championships	International	England
12–24	Ice hockey	(United States) 2013 Stanley Cup Finals	Domestic	(Illinois) Chicago Blackhawks
13–16	Golf	(United States) 2013 U.S. Open	International	(England) Justin Rose
14–16	Canoeing	(Portugal) 2013 Canoe Sprint European Championships	Continental	Russia
15–30	Basketball	(France) EuroBasket Women 2013	Continental	Spain
15	Motorcycle speedway	2013 Speedway Grand Prix of Poland	International	(Poland) Jarosław Hampel
15–25	Baseball	(United States) 2013 College World Series	Domestic	University of California, Los Angeles
15–30	Association football	(Brazil) 2013 FIFA Confederations Cup	International	Brazil
16	Grand Prix motorcycle racing	(Spain) 2013 Catalan motorcycle Grand Prix	International	MotoGP: (Spain) Jorge Lorenzo (Yamaha); Moto2: (Spain) Pol Espargaró (Kalex); Moto3: (Spain) Luis Salom (KTM)
16–21	Fencing	(Croatia) 2013 European Fencing Championships	Continental	Italy
17–23	Snooker	(China) 2013 Wuxi Classic	International	(Australia) Neil Robertson
20–26	Weightlifting	(Kazakhstan) 2013 Asian Weightlifting Championships	Continental	North Korea
20–30	Multi-sport	(Turkey) 2013 Mediterranean Games	International	Italy
21–23	WRC	(Italy) 10º Rally d'Italia Sardegna	International	(France) Sébastien Ogier ( (Germany) Volkswagen) (France) Julien Ingrassia
21 – 13 July	Association football	(Turkey) 2013 FIFA U-20 World Cup	International	France
22–23	Endurance racing	(France) 2013 24 Hours of Le Mans	International	(Germany) Audi Sport Team Joest ( (United Kingdom) Allan McNish/ (Denmark) Tom Kristensen/ (France) Loïc Duval)
24 – 7 July	Tennis	(United Kingdom) 2013 Wimbledon Championships	International	Men's singles: (United Kingdom) Andy Murray; Women's singles: (France) Marion Bartoli
27	Basketball	(United States) 2013 NBA draft	Domestic	#1 pick: (Canada) Anthony Bennett, University of Nevada, Las Vegas ( (Ohio) Cleveland Cavaliers)
27–30	Golf	(United States) 2013 U.S. Women's Open	International	(South Korea) Inbee Park
27 – 2 November	Canadian football	(Canada) 2013 CFL season	Domestic	For the playoffs, click here.
28–30	Rugby union	(Russia) 2013 Rugby World Cup Sevens	International	Men: New Zealand; Women: New Zealand
29	Grand Prix motorcycle racing	(Netherlands) 2013 Dutch TT	International	MotoGP: (Italy) Valentino Rossi (Yamaha); Moto2: (Spain) Pol Espargaró (Kalex); Moto3: (Spain) Luis Salom (KTM)
29	Motorcycle speedway	2013 Speedway Grand Prix of Denmark	International	(Australia) Darcy Ward
29 – 6 July	Multi-sport	(South Korea) 2013 Asian Indoor and Martial Arts Games	International	China
29 – 21 July	Road cycling	2013 Tour de France	International	(United Kingdom) Chris Froome ( (United Kingdom) Team Sky)
30	WTCC	2013 FIA WTCC Race of Portugal	International	(France) Yvan Muller ( (United Kingdom) (RML)) (United Kingdom) James Nash ( (United Kingdom) (Bamboo Engineering))
30	Formula One	(United Kingdom) 2013 British Grand Prix	International	(Germany) Nico Rosberg ( (Germany) Mercedes)
30 – 6 July	American football	(Finland) 2013 IFAF Women's World Championship	International	United States
30 – 7 July	Table tennis	(South Korea) 2013 Asian Table Tennis Championships	Continental	(China) Ma Long / (China) Liu Shiwen
30 – 9 July	Amateur boxing	(Jordan) 2013 Asian Amateur Boxing Championships	Continental	Kazakhstan

=== July ===
Date	Sport	Venue/Event	Status	Winner/s
1–7	Beach volleyball	(Poland) 2013 Beach Volleyball World Championships	International	Men: (Netherlands) Alexander Brouwer / Robert Meeuwsen; Women: (China) Xue Chen / Zhang Xi
3–7	Athletics	(India) 2013 Asian Athletics Championships	Continental	China
3 & 17	Association football	2013 Recopa Sudamericana	Continental	(Brazil) Corinthians
6–17	Multi-sport	(Russia) 2013 Summer Universiade	International	Russia
7	Formula One	(Germany) 2013 German Grand Prix	International	(Germany) Sebastian Vettel ( (Austria) Red Bull)
7–28	Association football	(United States) 2013 CONCACAF Gold Cup	Continental	United States
7–25 August	Sailing	(United States) 2013 Louis Vuitton Cup	International	Team New Zealand
8–14	Snooker	(Australia) 2013 Australian Goldfields Open	International	(Hong Kong) Marco Fu
10–14	Athletics	(Ukraine) 2013 World Youth Championships in Athletics	International	Jamaica
10–28	Association football	(Sweden) UEFA Women's Euro 2013	Continental	Germany
10 – 25 August	Cricket	(England) 2013 Ashes series	International	England
13–19	Multi-sport	(Bermuda) 2013 Island Games	International	Isle of Man
13–20	Sailing	(Cyprus) 2013 ISAF Youth Sailing World Championships	International	Australia
14	Grand Prix motorcycle racing	(Germany) 2013 German motorcycle Grand Prix	International	MotoGP: (Spain) Marc Márquez (Repsol Honda); Moto2: (Spain) Jordi Torres (Aspar Team); Moto3: (Spain) Álex Rins (KTM)
14–19	Multi-sport	(Netherlands) 2013 European Youth Summer Olympic Festival	Continental	Russia
15–21	Taekwondo	(Mexico) 2013 World Taekwondo Championships	International	South Korea
16	Baseball	(United States) 2013 MLB All-Star Game	Domestic	American League
18–21	Golf	(Scotland) 2013 Open Championship	International	(United States) Phil Mickelson
18–30	Multi-sport	(Israel) 2013 Maccabiah Games	International	Israel
19 – 4 August	Aquatics	(Spain) 2013 World Aquatics Championships	International	United States
20–28	Association football	(South Korea) 2013 EAFF East Asian Cup	Regional	Japan
21	Grand Prix motorcycle racing	2013 United States motorcycle Grand Prix	International	MotoGP: (Spain) Marc Márquez (Repsol Honda)
24–28	BMX	(New Zealand) 2013 UCI BMX World Championships	International	(United States) Connor Fields / (Colombia) Mariana Pajón
25 – 4 August	Multi-sport	(Colombia) World Games 2013	International	Italy
26–28	Athletics	(United Kingdom) Sainsbury's Anniversary Games	International	United States
26 – 4 August	Multi-sport	(Bulgaria) 2013 Summer Deaflympics	International	Russia
27	Road cycling	(Spain) 2013 Clásica de San Sebastián	International	(France) Tony Gallopin
27 – 3 August	Road cycling	(Poland) 2013 Tour de Pologne	International	(Netherlands) Pieter Weening
27 – 4 August	Field hockey	(Germany) 2013 Women's Hockey Junior World Cup	International	Netherlands
27 – 4 August	Tennis	(United States) 2013 Citi Open	International	(Argentina) Juan Martín del Potro / (Slovakia) Magdaléna Rybáriková
28	Formula One	(Hungary) 2013 Hungarian Grand Prix	International	(United Kingdom) Lewis Hamilton ( (United Kingdom) Mercedes)
28 – 4 August	Multi-sport	(South Africa) 2013 World Transplant Games	International	Note: See Multi-sport events section below
28 – 4 August	Aquatics	(Spain) 2013 World Aquatics Championships	International	United States
30 – 4 August	Beach volleyball	(Austria) 2013 European Beach Volleyball Championships	Continental	(Spain) Adrián Gavira / Pablo Herrera (Austria) Doris Schwaiger / Stefanie Schwaiger
31	Association football	(United States) (Canada) 2013 MLS All-Star Game	Continental	(Italy) AS Roma

=== August ===
Date	Sport	Venue/Event	Status	Winner/s
1–4	Golf	(Scotland) 2013 Women's British Open	International	(United States) Stacy Lewis
1–10	Multi-sport	(United Kingdom) 2013 World Police and Fire Games	International	United States
1–11	Basketball	(Philippines) 2013 FIBA Asia Championship	Continental	Iran
2–4	WRC	63rd Neste Oil Rally Finland	International	(France) Sébastien Ogier ( (Germany) Volkswagen) (France) Julien Ingrassia
2 – 1 September	Volleyball	(Japan) 2013 FIVB World Grand Prix	International	Brazil
3	Motorcycle speedway	2013 Speedway Grand Prix of Italy	International	(Denmark) Niels Kristian Iversen
3	Rugby union	(New Zealand) 2013 Super Rugby Final	Regional	(New Zealand) Chiefs
3–11	Tennis	(Canada) 2013 Rogers Cup	International	(Spain) Rafael Nadal / (United States) Serena Williams
3–11	Multi-sport	(Italy) 2013 World Masters Games	International	Note: See Multi-sport events section below
4	WTCC	2013 FIA WTCC Race of Argentina	International	(France) Yvan Muller ( (United States) (Chevrolet)) (Argentina) José María López ( (Germany) (BMW))
5–11	Badminton	(China) 2013 BWF World Championships	International	(China) Lin Dan / (Thailand) Ratchanok Inthanon
5–12	Fencing	(Hungary) 2013 World Fencing Championships	International	Russia
8–11	Golf	(United States) 2013 PGA Championship	International	(United States) Jason Dufner
8–18	Field hockey	(Canada) 2013 Men's Pan American Cup	Continental	Argentina
10–18	Athletics	(Russia) 2013 World Championships in Athletics	International	Russia
12–18	Road cycling	(Belgium) / (Netherlands) 2013 Eneco Tour	International	(Czech Republic) Zdeněk Štybar
12–18	Tennis	(United States) / (United States) 2013 Western & Southern Open	International	(Spain) Rafael Nadal / (Belarus) Victoria Azarenka
14–18	Basketball	(Australia) / (New Zealand) 2013 FIBA Oceania Championship	Continental	Australia
14–18	Basketball	(Australia) / (New Zealand) 2013 FIBA Oceania Championship for Women	Continental	Australia
15–25	Baseball	(United States) 2013 Little League World Series	International	(Japan) Musashi-Fuchū Little League; Tokyo
16–18	Golf	(United States) 2013 Solheim Cup	International	Team Europe
16–24	Multi-sport	(China) 2013 Asian Youth Games	Continental	China
17	Motorcycle speedway	2013 Speedway Grand Prix of Latvia	International	(United States) Greg Hancock
17 – 5 October	Rugby union	(Argentina) (Australia) (South Africa) (New Zealand) 2013 Rugby Championship	International	New Zealand
17–24	Field hockey	(Belgium) 2013 Women's EuroHockey Nations Championship	Continental	Germany
17–25	Field hockey	(Belgium) 2013 Men's EuroHockey Nations Championship	Continental	Germany
17 – 3 May 2014	Rugby union	(France) 2013–14 Top 14 season	Domestic	
18	Motorcycle racing	(United States) 2013 Indianapolis motorcycle Grand Prix	International	MotoGP: (Spain) Marc Márquez (Repsol Honda); Moto2: (Spain) Esteve Rabat (Kalex Honda); Moto3: (Spain) Álex Rins (KTM)
19–28	Modern pentathlon	(Chinese Taipei) 2013 World Modern Pentathlon Championships	International	France and Lithuania (tie)
20–31	Basketball	(Ivory Coast) 2013 FIBA Africa Championship	Continental	Angola
22 – 1 September	Volleyball	(Turkey) 2013 FIVB Volleyball Men's U21 World Championship	International	Russia
23–25	WRC	(Germany) 31. ADAC Rallye Deutschland	International	(Spain) Dani Sordo ( (France) Citroën World Rally Team) (Spain) Carlos del Barrio
24 – 1 September	Field hockey	(Malaysia) 2013 Men's Hockey Asia Cup	Continental	South Korea
24 – 15 September	Road cycling	(Spain) 2013 Vuelta a España	International	(United States) Chris Horner ( (Luxembourg) RadioShack-Leopard)
25	Motorcycle racing	2013 Czech Republic motorcycle Grand Prix	International	MotoGP: (Spain) Marc Márquez (Repsol Honda); Moto2: (Finland) Mika Kallio (Kalix); Moto3: (Spain) Luis Salom (KTM)
25	Formula One	(Belgium) 2013 Belgian Grand Prix	International	(Germany) Sebastian Vettel ( (United Kingdom) Red Bull Racing)
25 – 1 September	Rowing	(South Korea) 2013 World Rowing Championships	International	Italy
26 – 1 September	Judo	(Brazil) 2013 World Judo Championships	International	Japan
26 – 1 September	Mountain bike racing	(South Africa) 2013 UCI Mountain Bike & Trials World Championships	International	Australia
26–31	Swimming	(United Arab Emirates) 2013 FINA World Junior Swimming Championships	International	Australia
26 – 9 September	Tennis	(United States) 2013 US Open	International	Men's singles: (Spain) Rafael Nadal; Women's singles: (United States) Serena Williams
28 – 1 September	Rhythmic gymnastics	(Ukraine) 2013 World Rhythmic Gymnastics Championships	International	Russia
29 – 1 September	Canoeing	(Germany) 2013 ICF Canoe Sprint World Championships	International	Germany (canoe); United Kingdom (paracanoe)
29 – 14 December	American football	(United States) 2013 NCAA Division I FBS football season	Domestic	Conference champions here
30	Association football	(Czech Republic) 2013 UEFA Super Cup	Continental	(Germany) Bayern Munich
30 – 11 September	Basketball	(Venezuela) 2013 FIBA Americas Championship	Continental	Mexico
31 – 11 September	Association football	(Nepal) 2013 SAFF Championship	Regional	Afghanistan

=== September ===
Date	Sport	Venue/Event	Status	Winner/s
1	Motorcycle racing	(United Kingdom) 2013 British motorcycle Grand Prix	International	MotoGP: (Spain) Jorge Lorenzo ( (Japan) Yamaha); Moto2: (United Kingdom) Scott Redding (Kalex); Moto3: (Spain) Luis Salom ( (Austria) KTM)
1	Road cycling	2013 GP Ouest-France – Plouay	International	Men: (Italy) Filippo Pozzato; Women: (Netherlands) Marianne Vos
2–12	Multi-sport	(France) / (Wallis and Futuna) 2013 Pacific Mini Games	Regional	Tahiti
3–8	Badminton	2013 Chinese Taipei Open Grand Prix Gold	International	(South Korea) Shon Wan-ho / (South Korea) Sung Ji-hyun
4–22	Basketball	(Slovenia) FIBA EuroBasket 2013	Continental	France
4 – 3 March 2014	Ice hockey	(Russia) / (Belarus) / (Croatia) / (Czech Republic) / (Kazakhstan) / (Latvia) / (Slovakia) / (Ukraine) 2013–14 KHL season	Regional	
5 – 29 December	American football	(United States) 2013 NFL season	Domestic	
6–14	Volleyball	(Germany) / (Switzerland) 2013 Women's European Volleyball Championship	Continental	Russia
6–15	Multi-sport	(France) 2013 Jeux de la Francophonie	International	France
6 – 10 May 2014	Rugby union	(England) 2013–14 Aviva Premiership	Domestic	
6 – 11 May 2014	Rugby union	(Ireland) / (Italy) / (Scotland) / (Wales) 2013–14 RaboDirect Pro12	Continental	
7	Motorcycle speedway	2013 Speedway Grand Prix of Slovenia	International	(Poland) Jarosław Hampel
7–25	Sailing	(United States) 2013 America's Cup	International	(United States) Oracle Team USA
8	Formula One	(Italy) 2013 Italian Grand Prix	International	(Germany) Sebastian Vettel ( (Austria) Red Bull–Renault)
8	WTCC	2013 FIA WTCC Race of the United States	International	(United Kingdom) Tom Chilton ( (United Kingdom) RML Group) (Italy) Gabriele Tarquini ( (Italy) JAS Motorsport)
11–15	Canoeing	(Czech Republic) 2013 ICF Canoe Slalom World Championships	International	Czech Republic
12–15	Squash	(Malaysia) Malaysian Open 2013	International	(Malaysia) Nicol David
12–15	Golf	(France) 2013 Evian Championship	International	(Norway) Suzann Pettersen
13	Road cycling	(Canada) 2013 Grand Prix Cycliste de Québec	International	(Netherlands) Robert Gesink ( (Netherlands) Belkin Pro Cycling Team)
13–15	WRC	22nd Coates Hire Rally Australia	International	(France) Sébastien Ogier ( (Germany) Volkswagen) (France) Julien Ingrassia
13–21	Volleyball	(Thailand) 2013 Asian Women's Volleyball Championship	Continental	Thailand
15	Motorcycle racing	2013 San Marino and Rimini's Coast motorcycle Grand Prix	International	MotoGP: (Spain) Jorge Lorenzo ( (Japan) Yamaha); Moto2: (Spain) Pol Espargaró (Kalex); Moto3: (Spain) Álex Rins ( (Austria) KTM)
15	Road cycling	(Canada) 2013 Grand Prix Cycliste de Montréal	International	(Slovakia) Peter Sagan ( (Italy) Cannondale Pro Cycling Team)
16–22	Snooker	(China) 2013 Shanghai Masters	International	(China) Ding Junhui
16–22	Tennis	(Russia) 2013 St. Petersburg Open	International	(Latvia) Ernests Gulbis
16–22	Amateur wrestling	(Hungary) 2013 World Wrestling Championships	International	Iran
17–6 October	Cricket	(India) 2013 Champions League Twenty20	International	(India) Mumbai Indians
18–28	Beach soccer	(French Polynesia) 2013 FIFA Beach Soccer World Cup	International	Russia
19–29	Field hockey	(Argentina) 2013 Women's Pan American Cup	Continental	Argentina
20–29	Basketball	(Mozambique) 2013 FIBA Africa Championship for Women	Continental	Angola
20–29	Volleyball	(Denmark) / (Poland) 2013 Men's European Volleyball Championship	Continental	Russia
21	Motorcycle speedway	(Sweden) 2013 Speedway Grand Prix of Scandinavia	International	(Denmark) Niels Kristian Iversen
21–27	Field hockey	(Malaysia) 2013 Women's Hockey Asia Cup	Continental	Japan
21–28	Basketball	(Mexico) 2013 FIBA Americas Championship for Women	Continental	Cuba
22–29	Road cycling	(Italy) 2013 UCI Road World Championships	International	Netherlands
22 – October 1	Multi-sport	(Indonesia) 2013 Islamic Solidarity Games	International	Indonesia
22	WTCC	2013 FIA WTCC Race of Japan	International	(Hungary) Norbert Michelisz ( (Hungary) Zengő Motorsport) (Netherlands) Tom Coronel ( (Italy) ROAL Motorsport)
22	Formula One	2013 Singapore Grand Prix	International	(Germany) Sebastian Vettel ( (Austria) Red Bull–Renault)
22–28	Tennis	(Japan) 2013 Toray Pan Pacific Open	Continental	(Czech Republic) Petra Kvitová
22 – 6 October	Tennis	2013 China Open	International	Men's Singles: (Serbia) Novak Djokovic; Women's Singles: (United States) Serena Williams
28	Australian rules football	(Australia) 2013 AFL Grand Final	Domestic	(Victoria (state)) Hawthorn
28 – 6 October	Volleyball	(United Arab Emirates) 2013 Asian Men's Volleyball Championship	Continental	Iran
29	Motorcycle racing	(Spain) 2013 Aragon motorcycle Grand Prix	International	MotoGP: (Spain) Marc Márquez (Honda); Moto2: (Spain) Nicolás Terol (Eskil Suter); Moto3: (Spain) Álex Rins (KTM)
29 – 6 October	Archery	(Turkey) 2013 World Archery Championships	International	South Korea
30 – 6 October	Artistic gymnastics	(Belgium) 2013 World Artistic Gymnastics Championships	International	Japan

=== October ===
Date	Sport	Venue/Event	Status	Winner/s
3–6	Golf	(United States) 2013 Presidents Cup	International	United States
4–6	Basketball	(Brazil) 2013 Intercontinental Cup	International	(Greece) Olympiacos
4–6	WRC	Rallye de France – Alsace 2013	International	(France) Sébastien Ogier ( (Germany) Volkswagen) (France) Julien Ingrassia
4–13	Table tennis	(Austria) 2013 Table Tennis European Championships	Continental	(Germany) Dimitrij Ovtcharov / (Sweden) Li Fen
5	Rugby league	(England) 2013 Super League Grand Final	Regional	Wigan Warriors
5	Motorcycle speedway	2013 Speedway Grand Prix of Poland Race 2	International	(Poland) Adrian Miedziński
5–12	Volleyball	(Mexico) 2013 FIVB Women's U23 Volleyball World Championship	International	China
6	Formula One	(South Korea) 2013 Korean Grand Prix	International	(Germany) Sebastian Vettel ( (Austria) Red Bull–Renault)
6	Road cycling	(Italy) 2013 Giro di Lombardia	International	(Spain) Joaquim Rodríguez
6	Rugby league	(Australia) 2013 NRL Grand Final	Domestic	Sydney Roosters
6–13	Volleyball	(Brazil) 2013 FIVB Men's U23 Volleyball World Championship	International	Brazil
6–15	Multi-sport	(China) 2013 East Asian Games	Regional	China
7–13	Tennis	(China) 2013 Shanghai Rolex Masters	International	(Serbia) Novak Djokovic
9–13	Volleyball	(Switzerland) 2013 FIVB Women's Club World Championship	International	(Turkey) Vakıfbank Spor Kulübü
11–15	Road cycling	(China) 2013 Tour of Beijing	International	(Spain) Beñat Intxausti
11–18	Squash	(United States) 2013 PSA & WSA US Open	International	Men: (France) Grégory Gaultier; Women: (Malaysia) Nicol David
12–11 May 2014	Rugby sevens	(Australia) / (United Arab Emirates) / (South Africa) / (United States) / (New Zealand) / (Japan) / (Hong Kong) / (Scotland) / (England) 2013–14 IRB Sevens World Series	International	
13	Formula One	(Japan) 2013 Japanese Grand Prix	International	(Germany) Sebastian Vettel ( (Austria) Red Bull–Renault)
13	Motorcycle racing	(Malaysia) 2013 Malaysian motorcycle Grand Prix	International	Moto GP: (Spain) Dani Pedrosa ( (Japan) Honda); Moto 2: (Spain) Esteve Rabat (Kalex); Moto 3: (Spain) Luis Salom ( (Austria) KTM)
14–18	Snooker	(India) 2013 Indian Open	International	(China) Ding Junhui
14–26	Amateur boxing	(Kazakhstan) 2013 AIBA World Boxing Championships	International	Kazakhstan
15–20	Volleyball	(Brazil) 2013 FIVB Men's Club World Championship	International	(Brazil) Sada Cruzeiro
17–8 November	Association football	(United Arab Emirates) 2013 FIFA U-17 World Cup	International	Nigeria
18–26	Multi-sport	(Russia) 2013 World Combat Games	International	Russia
20	Motorcycle racing	(Australia) 2013 Australian motorcycle Grand Prix	International	MotoGP: (Spain) Jorge Lorenzo (Yamaha); Moto2: (Spain) Pol Espargaró (Kalex); Moto3: (Spain) Álex Rins (KTM)
20–27	Weightlifting	(Poland) 2013 World Weightlifting Championships	International	China
21–27	Tennis	(Turkey) 2013 WTA Tour Championships	International	(United States) Serena Williams
22–27	Futsal	(Brazil) 2013 Grand Prix de Futsal	International	Brazil
23–30	Baseball	(United States) 2013 World Series	Domestic	(Massachusetts) Boston Red Sox
25–27	WRC	(Spain) 49º Rally RACC Catalunya – Costa Daurada	International	(France) Sébastien Ogier ( (Germany) Volkswagen) (France) Julien Ingrassia
26–3 November	Baseball	2013 Japan Series	Domestic	(Miyagi Prefecture) Tohoku Rakuten Golden Eagles
26–30 November	Rugby league	(England) / (Wales) 2013 Rugby League World Cup	International	Australia
27	Motorcycle racing	(Japan) 2013 Japanese motorcycle Grand Prix	International	MotoGP: (Spain) Jorge Lorenzo (Yamaha); Moto2: (Spain) Pol Espargaró (Kalex) (Spain) Álex Márquez (KTM)
27	Formula One	(India) 2013 Indian Grand Prix	International	(Germany) Sebastian Vettel ( (Austria) Red Bull–Renault)
27–3 November	Basketball	(Thailand) 2013 FIBA Asia Championship for Women	Continental	Japan
26–3 November	Tennis	(France) 2013 BNP Paribas Masters	International	(Serbia) Novak Djokovic
27–3 November	Snooker	(China) 2013 International Championship	International	(China) Ding Junhui
27–3 November	Squash	(England) 2013 PSA World Championship	International	(England) Nick Matthew
28–3 November	Tennis	(Bulgaria) 2013 Garanti Koza WTA Tournament of Champions	International	(Romania) Simona Halep

=== November ===
Date	Sport	Venue/Event	Status	Winner/s
2–3	Tennis	(Italy) 2013 Fed Cup World Group Final	International	Italy
3	Formula One	(United Arab Emirates) 2013 Abu Dhabi Grand Prix	International	(Germany) Sebastian Vettel ( (Austria) Red Bull–Renault)
3	WTCC	2013 FIA WTCC Race of China	International	(United Kingdom) Tom Chilton ( (United Kingdom) RML) (Portugal) Tiago Monteiro ( (Japan) Castrol Honda WTC Team)
3	Marathon	(United States) 2013 New York City Marathon	International	(Kenya) Geoffrey Mutai / Priscah Jeptoo
4–11	Tennis	(United Kingdom) 2013 ATP World Tour Finals	International	(Serbia) Novak Djokovic (Spain) David Marrero / (Spain) Fernando Verdasco
5	Horse racing	(Australia) 2013 Melbourne Cup	Domestic	Fiorente (jockey: Damien Oliver; trainer: Gai Waterhouse)
7–10	Trampolining	(Bulgaria) 2013 Trampoline World Championships	International	China
8–10	Speed skating	(Canada) 2013–14 ISU Speed Skating World Cup – World Cup 1	International	Netherlands
9	Endurance racing	(China) 6 Hours of Shanghai	International	(Germany) Audi Sport Team Joest ( (Germany) André Lotterer/ (France) Benoît Tréluyer/ (Switzerland) Marcel Fässler)
9	Association football	(China) 2013 AFC Champions League Final	Continental	(China) Guangzhou Evergrande
9-22	Chess	(India) World Chess Championship 2013	International	(Norway) Magnus Carlsen
10	Association football	(Egypt) 2013 CAF Champions League Final	Continental	(Egypt) Al Ahly
10	Motorcycle racing	(Spain) 2013 Valencian Community Grand Prix	International	MotoGP: (Spain) Jorge Lorenzo (Yamaha); Moto2: (Spain) Nicolás Terol (Suter); Moto3: (Spain) Maverick Viñales (KTM)
10–15	Squash	Qatar Classic 2013	International	(Egypt) Mohamed El Shorbagy
12–17	Volleyball	(Japan) 2013 FIVB Women's World Grand Champions Cup	International	Brazil
14–17	WRC	(United Kingdom) 2013 Wales Rally GB	International	(France) Sébastien Ogier ( (Germany) Volkswagen Motorsport); Julien Ingrassia
15–17	Speed skating	(United States) 2013–14 ISU Speed Skating World Cup – World Cup 2	International	Netherlands
15–17	Tennis	(Serbia) 2013 Davis Cup World Group Final	International	Czech Republic
16–30	Multi-sport	(Peru) 2013 Bolivarian Games	Regional	Colombia won the gold medal count; Venezuela won the overall medal count.
17	Formula One	2013 United States Grand Prix	International	(Germany) Sebastian Vettel ( (Austria) Red Bull–Renault)
17	WTCC	2013 Guia Race of Macau	International	(France) Yvan Muller ( (United Kingdom) RML) (United Kingdom) Robert Huff ( (Germany) Münnich Motorsport)
19–24	Volleyball	(Japan) 2013 FIVB Men's World Grand Champions Cup	International	Brazil
21 – 7 January 2014	Cricket	(Australia) 2013–14 Ashes series	International	Australia
22 – 30	Curling	(Norway) 2013 European Curling Championships	Continental	(Switzerland) Sven Michel / (Sweden) Margaretha Sigfridsson
24	Formula One	(Brazil) 2013 Brazilian Grand Prix	International	(Germany) Sebastian Vettel ( (Austria) Red Bull–Renault)
24	Canadian football	(Canada) 2013 Grey Cup	Domestic	Saskatchewan Roughriders
26–8 December	Snooker	(United Kingdom) 2013 UK Championship	International	(Australia) Neil Robertson
28–17 May 2014	Rugby sevens	(United Arab Emirates) / (United States) / (Brazil) / (China) / (Netherlands) 2013–14 IRB Women's Sevens World Series	International	New Zealand
29 – 1 December	Speed skating	(Kazakhstan) 2013–14 ISU Speed Skating World Cup – World Cup 3	International	United States
29 – 16 March 2014	Nordic skiing	2013–14 FIS Cross-Country World Cup	International	
30 – 8 December	Association football	(Japan) 2013 International Women's Club Championship	International	(Japan) INAC Kobe Leonessa
30 – 8 December	Field hockey	(Argentina) 2012–13 Women's FIH Hockey World League Final	International	Netherlands

=== December ===
Date	Sport	Venue/Event	Status	Winner/s
1–14	Kabaddi	(India) 2013 Kabaddi World Cup	International	Women's: (India) Indiap
3–8	Squash	2013 PSA & WSA Hong Kong Open	International	Men's: (England) Nick Matthew; Women's: (Malaysia) Nicol David
6–8	Speed skating	(Germany) 2013–14 ISU Speed Skating World Cup – World Cup 4	International	Netherlands
6–15	Field hockey	(India) 2013 Men's Hockey Junior World Cup	International	Germany
6–22	Handball	(Serbia) 2013 World Women's Handball Championship	International	Brazil
11–21	Multi-sport	(Italy) 2013 Winter Universiade	International	Russia
11–22	Association football	(Morocco) 2013 FIFA Club World Cup	International	(Germany) Bayern Munich
11–22	Multi-sport	(Myanmar) 2013 Southeast Asian Games	Regional	Thailand
12–15	Swimming	(Denmark) 2013 European Short Course Swimming Championships	Continental	Russia
12–18	Mind sport	(China) 2013 SportAccord World Mind Games	International	China
26–5 January	Ice hockey	(Sweden) 2014 World Junior Ice Hockey Championships	International	Finland

== American football ==
- Super Bowl XLVII – the Baltimore Ravens (AFC) won 34–31 over the San Francisco 49ers (NFC)
  - Location: Superdome
  - Attendance: 71,024
  - MVP: Joe Flacco, QB (Baltimore)
- 7 January: BCS National Championship Game at Sun Life Stadium in Miami Gardens, Florida. (2012 season):
  - The Alabama Crimson Tide defeat the Notre Dame Fighting Irish 42–14. It is the second consecutive national title, third in the last four years, and 15th overall for Alabama.
- June 28 – July 6: 2013 IFAF Women's World Championship in Vantaa (Helsinki), Finland
  - Champions: United States (second consecutive title); Second: Canada; Third: Finland

== Archery ==
- May 13 – August 25: 2013 FITA Archery World Cup
  - May 13 – 19 at (China) Shanghai
    - South Korea won both gold and overall medal tallies.
  - June 10–16 at (Turkey) Antalya
    - South Korea won both gold and overall medal tallies.
  - July 15–21 at (Colombia) Medellín
    - United States and China are tied in the gold medal tally. However, the United States won the overall medal tally, too.
  - August 19–25 at (Poland) Wrocław
    - South Korea won both the gold and overall medal tallies.
- September 21 & 22: FITA World Cup final in Paris
  - South Korea won the gold medal tally. South Korea and the United States are tied for the overall medal tally.
- September 29 – October 6: 2013 World Archery Championships at (Turkey) Belek (Antalya)
  - South Korea won both the gold and overall medal tallies.
- October 8–12: 2013 World Archery 3D Championships at Sassari
  - Host nation, Italy, won both the gold and overall medal tallies.
- October 13–20: 2013 World Archery Youth Championships at (China) Wuxi
  - South Korea won both the gold and overall medal tallies.
- November 1–7: 2013 World Archery Para Championships at (Thailand) Bangkok
  - Russia won the gold medal tally. Great Britain won the overall medal tally.

== Association football ==
- 5–18 January: The 21st Arabian Gulf Cup took place in Bahrain
  - Champions: United Arab Emirates (second title), Second: Iraq, Third: Kuwait
- 19 January – 10 February: The 2013 Africa Cup of Nations was held in South Africa
  - Champions: Nigeria (third title), Second: Burkina Faso, Third: Mali
- 18–27 January: The 2013 Copa Centroamericana was held in Costa Rica
  - Champions: Costa Rica (seventh title), Second: Honduras, Third: El Salvador
- March 6–13: The 2013 Algarve Cup was held in Portugal.
  - Champions: United States (ninth title), Second: Germany, Third: Norway
- 2013 AFC Champions League (First leg of final at the Seoul World Cup Stadium (South Korea); second leg at the Tianhe Stadium in Guangzhou, China)
  - (China) Guangzhou Evergrande F.C. defeated (South Korea) FC Seoul by the away goals rule. Guangzhou Evergrande represents the AFC region at the 2013 FIFA Club World Cup.
- 2013 CAF Champions League (First leg of final at the Orlando Stadium (Johannesburg, South Africa); second leg at the 30 June Stadium in Cairo, Egypt)
  - (Egypt) Al Ahly defeated the (South Africa) Orlando Pirates 3–1 on aggregate. Al Ahly represents the CAF region at the 2013 FIFA Club World Cup.
- 2012–13 CONCACAF Champions League (First leg of final at Estadio Corona in Torreón; second leg at Estadio Tecnológico in Monterrey)
  - (Mexico) Monterrey defeated fellow Mexican team, Santos Laguna, 4–2 on aggregate. Monterrey represents the CONCACAF region at the 2013 FIFA Club World Cup.
- 2013 Copa Libertadores (First leg of final at Estadio Defensores del Chaco in Asunción; second leg at Mineirão in Belo Horizonte)
  - After a 2–2 tie on aggregate a.e.t., (Brazil) Atlético Mineiro defeated (Paraguay) Olimpia 4–3 on penalties to claim its first title in this tournament. Atlético Mineiro represents the CONMEBOL region at the 2013 FIFA Club World Cup.
- 2012–13 OFC Champions League (final at Mount Smart Stadium, Auckland)
  - Auckland City defeated fellow New Zealand team, Waitakere United, 2–1 in the final. Auckland City represents the OFC region at the 2013 FIFA Club World Cup.
- 2012–13 UEFA Champions League (final at Wembley Stadium, London)
  - (Germany) Bayern Munich defeated fellow German team, Borussia Dortmund, 2–1 to claim its fifth title in this tournament. Bayern Munich represents the UEFA region at the 2013 FIFA Club World Cup.
- 2012–13 UEFA Europa League (final at Amsterdam Arena, Amsterdam)
  - (England) Chelsea defeated (Portugal) Benfica 2–1 to win the team's first Europa title.
- 2012–13 UEFA Women's Champions League (final at Stamford Bridge, London)
  - (Germany) Wolfsburg defeated (France) Lyon 1–0 to win its first title.
- June 5–18: The 2013 UEFA European Under-21 Football Championship was held in Israel
  - Spain defeated Italy 4–2 to claim its fourth title in this event.
- June 15–30: The 2013 FIFA Confederations Cup was held in Brazil (final at Estádio do Maracanã).
  - Host nation Brazil defeated Spain 3–0 to win its fourth title in this event.
- June 21 – July 13: The 2013 FIFA U-20 World Cup was held in Turkey
  - After a 0–0 tie, France defeated Uruguay 4–1 on penalties to claim its first title in this event.
- July 7–28: The 2013 CONCACAF Gold Cup was in the United States
  - The United States defeated Panama 1–0 to claim its fifth title in this event, and advances to a playoff against the 2015 Gold Cup winner for a spot in the 2017 FIFA Confederations Cup.
- July 10–28: The UEFA Women's Euro 2013 was held in Sweden
  - Germany defeated Norway 1–0 to claim its eighth title for this event.
- October 17 – November 8: The 2013 FIFA U-17 World Cup was held in the United Arab Emirates
  - Nigeria defeated Mexico 3–0 to win its fourth title in this event.
- December 11–22: The 2013 FIFA Club World Cup will be held in Morocco
  - (Germany) FC Bayern Munich defeated (Morocco) Raja Casablanca, 2–0, to claim its first Club World Cup title.

== Athletics ==
- March 1–3: 2013 European Athletics Indoor Championships in Gothenburg, Sweden
  - Russia won both gold and overall medals tally.
- March 24: 2013 IAAF World Cross Country Championships in Bydgoszcz, Poland
  - Kenya won the gold medal tally; Ethiopia won the overall medal tally.
- April 6 – September 8: IAAF World Challenge
- May 10 – September 6: 2013 IAAF Diamond League
  - The United States has the most overall winners in these one-day events of the IAAF DL.
- July 10–14: 2013 2013 World Youth Championships in Athletics in Donetsk, Ukraine
  - Jamaica won the gold medal tally; United States won the overall medal tally.
- August 10–18: 2013 World Championships in Athletics in Moscow
  - Host nation, Russia, won the gold medal tally; United States won the overall medal tally.

== Baseball ==
- The Houston Astros move from the National League to the American League
- March 2–19: The 2013 World Baseball Classic was held. First-round matches were played in Japan, Taiwan, Puerto Rico, and the United States. Japan and the US hosted the second round, and the final was organised in San Francisco. Dominican Republic became the first undefeated team in the tournament's history, beating Puerto Rico in the final game by the score of 3–0. Robinson Canó was named tournament MVP.
- July 16: The 2013 Major League Baseball All-Star Game was held at Citi Field, home of the New York Mets.
  - The American League defeated the National League, with the score of 3–0. It is the American League's 39th win overall. The MVP of the match is Mariano Rivera, of the New York Yankees.
- October 23–30: 2013 World Series
  - Winner: (Massachusetts) Boston Red Sox. The MVP of the series is David Ortiz of the Boston Red Sox. Also, this is the team's eighth World Series title.

== Basketball ==
- October 11, 2012 – May 12, 2013: 2012–13 Euroleague
  - (Greece) Olympiacos Piraeus defeated (Spain) Real Madrid 100–88 in the final for their second consecutive Euroleague title and third overall. Vassilis Spanoulis of Olympiacos is named Final Four MVP after having been named season MVP.
- November 6, 2012 – April 13, 2013: 2012–13 Eurocup Basketball
  - (Russia) PBC Lokomotiv Kuban defeated (Spain) Uxue Bilbao Basket 75–64 in the final.
- October 30, 2012 – June 20, 2013: 2012–13 NBA season
  - (Florida) Miami Heat defeated the (Texas) San Antonio Spurs 4–3 in the best-of-7 NBA Finals to claim their third NBA title.
- 17 February: All-Star Game in Houston
  - The West Conference defeated the East Conference 143–138. Chris Paul, of the Los Angeles Clippers, was named as the MVP of the game.
- March 19 – April 8: NCAA Division I Men's Basketball Tournament
  - Louisville defeated Michigan 82–76 in the championship game. The win gave Louisville its first championship since 1986, and third overall.
- March 23 – April 9: NCAA Division I Women's Basketball Tournament
  - Connecticut defeated Louisville 93–60 to win its eighth national championship.
- February 1 – April 13: 2013 FIBA Americas League
  - (gold) (Brazil) EC Pinheiros (silver) (Argentina) Lanús (bronze) (Puerto Rico) Capitanes de Arecibo
- June 15–30: EuroBasket Women 2013 in France; final at the Pévèle Arena in Orchies
  - Spain defeated France 70–69 to claim its second title in this event.
- August 30 – September 11: 2013 FIBA Americas Championship for Men in (Venezuela) Caracas
  - Mexico defeated Puerto Rico 91–89 to win its first title.
- September 4–22: FIBA EuroBasket 2013 in Slovenia; final at Arena Stožice in Ljubljana
  - France defeated Lithuania 80–66 to win its first title.
- September 21–28: FIBA Americas Championship for Women in (Mexico) Xalapa
  - Cuba defeated Canada 79–71 to claim its fourth title in this event.
- October 4–6: 2013 FIBA Intercontinental Cup in (Brazil) São Paulo
  - (Greece) Olympiacos Piraeus defeated EC Pinheiros 2–0 in a series to claim its first title in this event.

== Beach soccer ==
- May 24 – August 11: 2013 Euro Beach Soccer League. Superfinal and Promotional Final at (Spain) Torredembarra, from August 8–11
  - Russia wins its third EBSL title (Superfinal). France won the Promotional final.
- September 18–28: 2013 FIFA Beach Soccer World Cup in (French Polynesia) Papeete
  - Russia defeated Spain 5–1 to claim its second title. Brazil came in third here.

== Canadian football ==
- November 23: 49th Vanier Cup in Quebec City
  - (Quebec) Laval Rouge et Or defeated the (Alberta) Calgary Dinos 25–14 to win its eighth title.
- November 24: 101st Grey Cup in Regina, Saskatchewan
  - Saskatchewan Roughriders defeated the (Ontario) Hamilton Tiger-Cats 45–23 to win its fourth Grey Cup.

== Cricket ==
- June 6–23 – ICC Champions Trophy in England and Wales
  - Winner: India

== Fencing ==
- August 5–12: 2013 World Fencing Championships in Budapest, Hungary
  - Russia and Italy were tied for the gold medal tally, but Russia won the overall medal tally.

== Field hockey ==
- August 17–24: 2013 Women's EuroHockey Nations Championship at (Belgium) Boom
  - Germany defeated England in a penalty shootout to win its second title.
- August 17–25: 2013 Men's EuroHockey Nations Championship at Boom
  - Germany defeated Belgium, to win its eighth title.
- November 30 – December 8: 2012–13 Women's FIH Hockey World League Final at (Argentina) San Miguel de Tucumán
  - The Netherlands defeated Australia 5–1 to win its first title.

== Floorball ==
- Women's World Floorball Championships
  - Champion: Sweden
- Men's under-19 World Floorball Championships
  - Champion: Sweden
- Champions Cup
  - Men's champion: (Sweden) IBF Falun
  - Women's champion: (Sweden) Rönnby IBK

== Golf ==
=== Men's ===
Major championships

- April 11–14: Masters Tournament
  - Winner: (Australia) Adam Scott (first title and first major)
- June 13–16: U.S. Open
  - Winner: (England) Justin Rose (first title and first major)
- July 18–21: Open Championship
  - Winner: (United States) Phil Mickelson (first title and fifth major)
- August 8–11: PGA Championship
  - Winner: (United States) Jason Dufner (first title and first major)

Other significant events

- October 3–6: 2013 Presidents Cup at Muirfield Village in (United States) Dublin, Ohio
  - Team USA defeated Team International 18½ – 15½, to claim its eighth title.
- November 21–24: 2013 World Cup of Golf at the (Australia) Royal Melbourne Golf Club
  - Individual winner: (Australia) Jason Day
  - Team winner: (Australia) Jason Day and Adam Scott

=== Women's ===
Major championships

- April 4–7: Kraft Nabisco Championship
  - Winner: (South Korea) Inbee Park (first title and second major)
- June 6–9: LPGA Championship
  - Winner: (South Korea) Inbee Park (first title and third major)
- June 27–30: U.S. Women's Open
  - Winner: (South Korea) Inbee Park (second title and fourth major)
- August 1–4: Women's British Open
  - Winner: (United States) Stacy Lewis (first title and second major)
- September 12–15: The Evian Championship
  - Winner: (Norway) Suzann Pettersen (first title and second major)

Other significant events

- August 15–18: Solheim Cup at Colorado Golf Club in (United States) Parker, Colorado
  - Team Europe wins 18–10. It is Team Europe's first Solheim Cup win on American soil, and also the first time that the Europeans retain the Cup.

== Handball ==
- September 22, 2012 – May 12, 2013: 2012–13 EHF Women's Champions League.
  - Winner: (Hungary) Győri Audi ETO KC (first title)
- September 26, 2012 – June 2, 2013: 2012–13 EHF Champions League.
  - Winner: (Germany) HSV Hamburg (first title)
- January 11–27: 2013 World Men's Handball Championship in Spain
  - Spain defeated Denmark by the score of 35–19 to win their second title. Croatia won the bronze medal.
- December 7–22: 2013 World Women's Handball Championship in Serbia
  - Brazil defeated Serbia, 22–20, to claim its first title.

== Indoor lacrosse ==
- 5 January – 16 March: 2013 North American Lacrosse League season
  - Champions: (Massachusetts) Boston Rockhoppers
- 5 January – 11 May: 2013 National Lacrosse League season
  - Champions: (New York (state)) Rochester Knighthawks (fourth title).

== Mixed martial arts ==
The following is a list of major noteworthy MMA events by month.

January

1/12 — Strikeforce: Marquardt vs. Saffiedine

1/19 — UFC on FX: Belfort vs. Bisping

1/26 — UFC on Fox: Johnson vs. Dodson

February

2/2 — ONE Fighting Championship: Return of Warriors

2/2 — UFC 156: Aldo vs. Edgar

2/16 — UFC on Fuel TV: Barão vs. McDonald

2/23 — UFC 157: Rousey vs. Carmouche

March

3/2 — UFC on Fuel TV: Silva vs. Stann

3/16 — UFC 158: St-Pierre vs. Diaz

April

4/5 — ONE Fighting Championship: Kings and Champions

4/6 — UFC on Fuel TV: Mousasi vs. Latifi

4/13 — The Ultimate Fighter: Team Jones vs. Team Sonnen Finale

4/20 — UFC on Fox: Henderson vs. Melendez

4/27 — UFC 159: Jones vs. Sonnen

May

5/18 — UFC on FX: Belfort vs. Rockhold

5/25 — UFC 160: Velasquez vs. Bigfoot 2

5/31 — ONE Fighting Championship: Rise to Power

June

6/8 — UFC on Fuel TV: Nogueira vs. Werdum

6/15 — UFC 161: Evans vs. Henderson

July

7/6 — UFC 162: Silva vs. Weidman

7/27 — UFC on Fox: Johnson vs. Moraga

August

8/3 — UFC 163: Aldo vs. Korean Zombie

8/17 — UFC Fight Night: Shogun vs. Sonnen

8/28 — UFC Fight Night: Condit vs. Kampmann 2

8/31 — UFC 164: Henderson vs. Pettis II

September

9/4 — UFC Fight Night: Teixeira vs. Bader

9/13 — ONE Fighting Championship: Champions & Warriors

9/21 — UFC 165: Jones vs. Gustafsson

October

10/9 — UFC Fight Night: Maia vs. Shields

10/18 — ONE Fighting Championship: Total Domination

10/19 — UFC 166: Velasquez vs. Dos Santos 3

10/26 — UFC Fight Night: Machida vs. Muñoz

November

11/6 — UFC: Fight for the Troops 3

11/9 — UFC Fight Night: Belfort vs. Henderson 2

11/16 — UFC 167: St-Pierre vs. Hendricks

11/30 — The Ultimate Fighter: Team Rousey vs. Team Tate Finale

December

12/6 — UFC Fight Night: Hunt vs. Bigfoot

12/14 — UFC on Fox: Johnson vs. Benavidez 2

12/28 — UFC 168: Weidman vs. Silva 2

== Netball ==
International tournaments

Date	Tournament	Winners	Runners up
4–6 June	2013 Pacific Netball Series	Fiji	Papua New Guinea
24–28 June	2013 African Netball Championship	South Africa	Malawi
15 Sept–13 Oct	2013 Constellation Cup	Australia	New Zealand
24–31 October	2013 Taini Jamison Trophy Series	New Zealand	Malawi
27–30 October	2013 Diamond Challenge	South Africa	Zimbabwe
8–10 November	2013 Fast5 Netball World Series	New Zealand	Australia

Major leagues

Host	League	Winners	Runners up
Australia/New Zealand	ANZ Championship	Adelaide Thunderbirds	Queensland Firebirds
United Kingdom	Netball Superleague	Team Bath	Celtic Dragons

== Orienteering ==
=== 2013 Orienteering World Cup ===
- January 6: #1 in New Zealand
  - Winners: (Switzerland) Fabian Hertner (m) / (Sweden) Helena Jansson (f)
- January 8: #2 in New Zealand
  - Winners: (Switzerland) Matthias Kyburz (m) / (Sweden) Tove Alexandersson (f)
- January 13: #3 in New Zealand
  - Winners: (Sweden) Jerker Lysell (m) / (Sweden) Tove Alexandersson (f)
- June 1: #4 in Norway
  - Winners: (Switzerland) Matthias Kyburz (m) / (Switzerland) Simone Niggli-Luder (f)
- June 2: #5 in Norway
  - Winners: (Norway) Carl Kaas Codager (m) / (Switzerland) Simone Niggli-Luder (f)
- June 4: #6 in Sweden
- June 7: #7 in Finland
  - Winners: (Switzerland) Matthias Kyburz (m) / (Switzerland) Simone Niggli-Luder (f)
- June 8: #8 in Finland
- October 5: #9 in Switzerland
  - Winners: (Switzerland) Daniel Hubmann (m) / (Switzerland) Simone Niggli-Luder (f)
- October 6: #10 in Switzerland
  - Winners: (Switzerland) Matthias Kyburz (m) / (Switzerland) Simone Niggli-Luder (f)

=== International and Continental events ===
- January 6–13: 2013 Oceania Orienteering Championships in New Zealand
  - Sprint winners: (New Zealand) Toby Scott (m) / (New Zealand) Angela Simpson (f)
  - Middle distance winners: (Australia) Kasimir Gregory (m) / (Australia) Lauren Gillis (f)
  - Long distance winners: (New Zealand) Thomas Reynolds (m) / (Australia) Grace Crane (f)
  - Relay winners: Australia (m) / Australia (f)
- February 22 – 24: Mediterranean Championships in Orienteering 2013 in Turkey
  - Sprint winners: (Switzerland) Daniel Hubmann (m) / (Sweden) Lena Eliasson (f)
  - Middle distance winners: (Switzerland) Baptiste Rollier (m) / (Norway) Silje Ekroll Jahren (f)
- April 13: Central European Spring Orienteering Meeting, Stage 1 in Slovakia
  - Sprint winners: (Czech Republic) Jan Procházka (m) / (Austria) Elisa Elstner (f)
- May 18: Baltic Championships in Estonia
  - Long distance winners: (Estonia) Timo Sild (m) / (Lithuania) Indrė Valaitė
- July 31 – August 7: 2013 World Orienteering Championships in (Finland) Vuokatti
  - Long distance #1 winners: (Latvia) Edgars Bertuks (m) / (Switzerland) Simone Niggli-Luder (f)
  - Long distance #2 winners: (Finland) Tero Föhr (m) / (Sweden) Tove Alexandersson (f)
  - Long distance #3 winners: (Finland) Jani Lakanen (m) / (United Kingdom) Catherine Taylor (f)
  - Long distance #4 winners: (France) Thierry Gueorgiou (m) / (Switzerland) Simone Niggli-Luder (f)
  - Sprint #1 winners: (Finland) Mårten Boström (m) / (Switzerland) Simone Niggli-Luder (f)
  - Sprint #2 winners: (Sweden) Jerker Lysell (m) / (Denmark) Maja Alm (f)
  - Sprint #3 winners: (Norway) Øystein Kvaal Østerbø (m) / (Russia) Galina Vinogradova (f)
  - Sprint #4 winners: (Denmark) Rasmus Thrane Hansen (m) / (Switzerland) Simone Niggli-Luder (f)
  - Middle distance #1 winners: (Switzerland) Daniel Hubmann (m) / (Sweden) Annika Billstam (f)
  - Middle distance #2 winners: (Latvia) Kalvis Mihailovs (m) / (Latvia) Inga Dambe (f)
  - Middle distance #3 winners: (Switzerland) Matthias Kyburz (m) / (Sweden) Tove Alexandersson (f)
  - Middle distance #4 winners: (Russia) Leonid Novikov (m) / (Switzerland) Simone Niggli-Luder (f)
- September 5–7: South East European Orienteering Championships 2013 in Romania
  - Sprint winners: (Romania) Ionut Zinca (m) / (Spain) Alicia Cobo Caballero (f)
  - Long distance winners: (Romania) Ionut Zinca (m) / (Bulgaria) Nataliya Dimitrova (f)
  - Middle distance winners: (Romania) Ionut Zinca (m) / (Romania) Veronica Minoiu (f)
- November 17: South American Orienteering Championship in Brazil
  - Winners: (Brazil) Cleber Baratto Vidal (m) / (Brazil) Miriam Ferraz Pasturiza (f)

== Rink hockey ==
- September 20–28: 2013 FIRS Men's Roller Hockey World Cup in (Angola) Luanda and Namibe (now Moçâmedes)
  - Spain defeated Argentina 4–3 to claim its sixteenth title.
- October 6–12: 2013 FIRS Roller Hockey World Cup U-20 in (Colombia) Cartagena
  - Portugal defeated Spain 4–1 to claim its second title.

== Roller derby ==
- November 8–10: The 2013 Women's Flat Track Derby Association Championships in (United States) Milwaukee, hosted by the Brewcity Bruisers.
  - Winner: (New York (state)) Gotham Girls Roller Derby

== Rugby league ==
- October 26 – November 30: 2013 Rugby League World Cup at the United Kingdom (England and Wales only)
  - Australia won its 10th title by defeating New Zealand 34–2 in the final.

== Rugby union ==
- 2 February – 16 March: Six Nations Championship
  - Wales defended their RBS 6 Nations crown with a 30–3 victory against England. 26th title.
- May 17: Amlin Challenge Cup Final at RDS Arena, Dublin:
  - (Ireland) Leinster defeat (France) Stade Français 34–13 to claim the first Challenge Cup title for an Irish side.
- May 18: Heineken Cup Final at Aviva Stadium, Dublin:
  - (France) Toulon defeat (France) Clermont 16–15 to win their first European trophy.
- May 28 – June 9: 2013 IRB Junior World Rugby Trophy in Temuco, Chile
  - (gold) Italy, (silver) Canada, (bronze) Chile. Italy claim their second title and earn promotion to the 2014 IRB Junior World Championship.
- June 1 – July 6: British & Irish Lions tour to Australia
  - The Lions win the three-Test series against Australia 2–1. It is the Lions' first series win since defeating South Africa in 1997.
- IRB Sevens World Series:
  - (gold) New Zealand, (silver) South Africa, (bronze) Fiji. New Zealand claim their third consecutive series crown and 11th overall.
  - World Series Core Team Qualifier: Portugal, Scotland and Spain all retain their core team status for the 2013–14 series.
- IRB Women's Sevens World Series:
  - (gold) New Zealand, (silver) England, (bronze) Canada. New Zealand claim the inaugural series crown.
- June 5–23: 2013 IRB Junior World Championship in France
  - (gold) England, (silver) Wales, (bronze) South Africa. England win their first title. The United States finishes last and is relegated to the 2014 IRB Junior World Rugby Trophy.
- June 28–30: 2013 Rugby World Cup Sevens in Moscow, Russia
  - Men's: (gold) New Zealand, (silver) England, (bronze) Fiji. New Zealand win their second title.
  - Women's: (gold) New Zealand, (silver) Canada, (bronze) United States. New Zealand win their first title.
- 15 February – 13 July: Super Rugby: The Chiefs top the regular-season table.
  - Super Rugby Final, August 3 at Waikato Stadium, Hamilton, New Zealand:
    - The Chiefs successfully defend their title from last season, defeating the (Australia) Brumbies 27–22. It is also the second Super Rugby title for the Chiefs.
  - In the (South Africa) South African promotion/relegation playoff, held over two legs on July 26 and August 3, the Lions defeat the Kings 44–42. The Lions will replace the Kings for the 2014 season.
- August 17 – October 5: The Rugby Championship
  - New Zealand sweep all six matches for the second consecutive year, maintaining their 100% record since the competition was expanded to include Argentina in 2012. Including the competition's previous history as the Tri Nations, it is the 10th title for the All Blacks.

Domestic competitions

- (Japan) Top League Final, 27 January at Chichibunomiya Rugby Stadium, Tokyo:
  - Suntory Sungoliath defeat Toshiba Brave Lupus 19–3 to defend their title from last season. It is also Suntory's third league title overall.
- (England) English Premiership Final, May 25 at Twickenham, London:
  - Leicester Tigers defeat Northampton Saints 37–17 to claim their 10th Premiership crown.
- RFU Championship Final, May 23 and 30:
  - Newcastle Falcons defeat Bedford Blues 49–33 on aggregate in the two-legged final. As Newcastle were confirmed as meeting the Premiership's minimum standards, they replaced the Premiership's bottom club, London Welsh.
- Top 14 Final, June 1 at Stade de France, Saint-Denis:
  - Castres defeat Toulon 19–14 to claim their fourth title, and first since 1993.
- Rugby Pro D2:
  - Oyonnax automatically promoted to Top 14 as champion. Brive also earn promotion as winner of playoffs between the next four teams. They replaced the bottom two teams in Top 14, Agen and Mont-de-Marsan.
- (Ireland) (Italy) (Scotland) (Wales) Pro12 Final, May 25 at RDS Arena, Dublin:
  - (Ireland) Leinster, fresh off victory in the Amlin Challenge Cup, defeat (Ireland) Ulster 24–18 for their third Celtic League/Pro12 title.
- (England) (Wales) LV Cup (Anglo-Welsh Cup): (England) Harlequins
- ITM Cup
  - Premiership Final, October 26 at Westpac Stadium, Wellington: Canterbury defeat Wellington 29–13 to claim their sixth consecutive title in New Zealand's top level, and 11th overall.
  - Championship Final, October 25 at Trafalgar Park, Nelson: Tasman defeat Hawke's Bay 26–25 and are promoted to the 2014 ITM Premiership, replacing bottom-placed Bay of Plenty.
- (South Africa) Currie Cup Final, October 26 at Newlands, Cape Town:
  - The Sharks defeat Western Province 33–19 for their seventh Currie Cup crown.

== Tennis ==
- Australian Open
  - 26 January: Victoria Azarenka defeated Li Na 4–6, 6–4, 6–3. Second title.
  - 27 January: Novak Djokovic defeated Andy Murray 6–7 7–6 6–3 6–2. Sixth Grand Slam title. Fourth Australian Open, third in a row.
- French Open
  - June 8: Serena Williams defeated Maria Sharapova 6–4 6–4.
  - June 9: Rafael Nadal defeated David Ferrer 6–3, 6–2, 6–3.
- The Championships, Wimbledon
  - July 6: Marion Bartoli defeated Sabine Lisicki 6–1, 6–4. First Grand Slam title.
  - July 7: Andy Murray defeated Novak Djokovic 6–4, 7–5, 6–4. Murray becomes the first British winner of the Gentlemen's Singles at Wimbledon since Fred Perry in 1936, and also earns his second Grand Slam title.
- US Open
  - September 8: Serena Williams defeated Victoria Azarenka 7–5, 6–7^{(6–8)}, 6–1. 17th Grand Slam title.
  - September 9: Rafael Nadal defeated Novak Djokovic 6–2, 3–6, 6–4, 6–1. 13th Grand Slam title.
- WTA Tour Championships
  - Winner: Serena Williams. 11th title.
- ATP World Tour Finals
  - Winner: Novak Djokovic.
- Hopman Cup 29 December 2012 – 5 January 2013
  - Spain defeated Serbia in the final by the score of 2–1 . Fourth title.
- Fed Cup
  - Italy defeated Russia 4–0, to claim their fourth title.
- Davis Cup
  - Czech Republic defeated Serbia 3–2, to claim their third title.

Other events

- July 6: Bob and Mike Bryan win the Gentlemen's Doubles at Wimbledon, becoming the first men's doubles team in the Open era to hold all four Grand Slam titles at once.

== Wrestling ==
- September 16–22: 2013 World Wrestling Championships in (Hungary) Budapest
  - Iran won the gold medal tally. Russia won the overall medal tally.

== Multi-sport events ==
- 29 January – 5 February: 2013 Special Olympics World Winter Games in Pyeongchang, South Korea
  - Alpine skiing results here.
  - Cross country skiing results here.
  - Figure skating results here.
  - Floor hockey results here.
  - Floorball results here.
  - Short track speed skating results here.
  - Snowboarding results here.
  - Snowshoeing results here.
- March 3–17: 2013 Central American Games in San José, Costa Rica
  - Guatemala won both the gold and overall medal tallies.
- March 25–29: 2013 CSIM World Winter Games in Annecy, France
  - Host nation, France, won both gold and overall medal tallies.
- May 27 – June 1: 2013 Games of the Small States of Europe in Luxembourg City, Luxembourg
  - Host nation, Luxembourg, won both the gold and overall medal tallies.
- June 20–30: 2013 Mediterranean Games in Mersin, Turkey
  - Italy won both the gold and overall medal tallies.
- June 29 – July 6: 2013 Asian Indoor and Martial Arts Games in Incheon, South Korea (formerly the Asian Indoor Games and the Asian Martial Arts Games separately)
  - China won the gold medal tally. Host nation, South Korea, won the overall medal tally.
- July 6–17: 2013 Summer Universiade in Kazan, Russia
  - Host nation, Russia, won both the gold and overall medal tallies.
- July 13–19: 2013 Island Games in Bermuda
  - Isle of Man won both the gold and overall medal tallies.
- July 18–30: 2013 Maccabiah Games in Jerusalem, Israel
  - Host nation, Israel, won both the gold and overall medal tallies.
- July 25 – August 4: World Games 2013 in Cali, Colombia
  - Italy won the gold medal tally; Russia won the overall medal tally.
- July 26 – August 4: 2013 Summer Deaflympics in Sofia, Bulgaria
  - Russia won both the gold and overall medal tallies.
- July 28 – August 4: 2013 World Transplant Games in Durban, South Africa
  - Link to results here.
- August 1–10: 2013 World Police and Fire Games in Belfast, Northern Ireland, UK
  - The United States won both the gold and overall medal tallies.
- August 3–11: 2013 World Masters Games in Turin, Italy
  - Link to results here.
- September 2–12: 2013 Pacific Mini Games in Mata-Utu, Wallis and Futuna
  - Tahiti won the gold medal tally. Papua New Guinea won the overall medal tally.
- September 6–15: 2013 Jeux de la Francophonie in Nice
  - Host nation, France, won both the gold and overall medal tallies.
- September 22 – October 1: 2013 Islamic Solidarity Games in Palembang
  - Host nation, Indonesia, won both the gold and overall medal tallies.
- October 6–15: 2013 East Asian Games in Tianjin
  - Host nation, China, won both the gold and overall medal tallies.
- October 18–26: SportAccord 2013 World Combat Games in Saint Petersburg
  - Host nation, Russia, won both the gold and overall medal tallies.
- November 16–30: 2013 Bolivarian Games in Trujillo, Peru
  - Colombia won the gold medal tally. Venezuela won the overall medal tally.
- December 11–21: 2013 Winter Universiade in Trentino, Italy
  - Russia won both the gold and overall medal tallies.
- December 11–22: 2013 Southeast Asian Games in Naypyidaw, Myanmar
  - Thailand won both the gold and overall medal tallies.
- December 12–18: 2013 SportAccord World Mind Games in Beijing
  - Host nation, China, won both the gold and overall medal tallies.

== Notes ==
- The 2013 Boston Marathon was overshadowed by the Boston Marathon bombing which resulted in 3 fatalities and hundreds being injured.
