= Denys Shcherbakov =

Ukrainian orienteering competitor (born 1988)

Medal record

Men's orienteering

Representing Ukraine

World Championships
Bronze medal – third place	2013 Vuokatti	Relay

Denys Shcherbakov (born 4 June 1988) is a Ukrainian orienteering competitor. He competed at the 2013 World Orienteering Championships, and won a bronze medal in the relay with the Ukrainian team, together with Pavlo Ushkvarok and Oleksandr Kratov.

He was born in Tsiurupynsk, Ukraine, but represents the club OK Rönneby in Sweden.
