= 2013 World Orienteering Championships =

2013 edition of the World Orienteering Championships

World Orienteering Championships 2013
- Host city: Vuokatti
- Country: Finland
- Nations: 44
- Opening: 6 July 2013
- Closing: 14 July 2013
- Website: woc2013.fi

The 30th World Orienteering Championships was held in Vuokatti, Finland, from 6 to 14 July 2013.

== Medalists ==
=== Men ===
| Event | Gold | Silver | Bronze |
|---|---|---|---|
| Sprint | Mårten Boström; Finland | Scott Fraser; Great Britain | Jonas Leandersson; Sweden |
| Middle distance | Leonid Novikov; Russia | Thierry Gueorgiou; France | Gustav Bergman; Sweden |
| Long distance | Thierry Gueorgiou; France | Jani Lakanen; Finland | Edgars Bertuks; Latvia |
| Relay | Russia; Leonid Novikov; Valentin Novikov; Dmitriy Tsvetkov | Sweden; Anders Holmberg; Peter Öberg; Gustav Bergman | Ukraine; Pavlo Ushkvarok; Oleksandr Kratov; Denys Sherbakov |

=== Women ===
| Event | Gold | Silver | Bronze |
|---|---|---|---|
| Sprint | Simone Niggli; Switzerland | Annika Billstam; Sweden | Venla Niemi; Finland |
| Middle distance | Simone Niggli; Switzerland | Tove Alexandersson; Sweden | Merja Rantanen; Finland |
| Long distance | Simone Niggli; Switzerland | Tove Alexandersson; Sweden | Lena Eliasson; Sweden |
| Relay | Norway; Heidi Bagstevold; Anne M. Hausken Nordberg; Mari Fasting | Finland; Venla Niemi; Anni-Maija Fincke; Minna Kauppi | Switzerland; Sara Lüscher; Judith Wyder; Simone Niggli |

== Participating countries ==
A total of 44 countries participated at this World Championships.

- Argentina
- Australia
- Austria
- Azerbaijan
- Belarus
- Belgium
- Bulgaria
- Canada
- China
- Chinese Taipei
- Croatia
- Czech Republic
- Denmark
- DPR Korea
- Estonia
- Finland
- France
- Germany
- Great Britain
- Hong Kong
- Hungary
- Ireland
- Israel
- Italy
- Japan
- Latvia
- Lithuania
- Moldova
- Montenegro
- New Zealand
- Norway
- Poland
- Portugal
- Romania
- Russia
- Serbia
- Slovakia
- Spain
- Sweden
- Switzerland
- Turkey
- Ukraine
- United States
- Uruguay

== Results ==
=== Sprint ===
The sprint finals were held on 8 July 2013 at Hiukka, Sotkamo.

==== Men's sprint ====
WOC 2013 – Sprint final – Men (3.9 km)
| Rank | Competitor | Nation | Time |
|---|---|---|---|
| 1st place, gold medalist(s) | Mårten Boström | Finland | 14:19.6 |
| 2nd place, silver medalist(s) | Scott Fraser | Great Britain | 14:36.7 |
| 3rd place, bronze medalist(s) | Jonas Leandersson | Sweden | 14:37.8 |
| 4 | Fabian Hertner | Switzerland | 14:41.3 |
| 5 | Matthias Kyburz | Switzerland | 14:45.8 |
| 6 | Rasmus Thrane Hansen | Denmark | 14:47.3 |
| 7 | Øystein Kvaal Østerbø | Norway | 14:49.4 |
| 8 | Jerker Lysell | Sweden | 14:52.3 |
| 9 | Murray Strain | Great Britain | 14:56.4 |
| 10 | Jan Procházka | Czech Republic | 14:56.8 |
| 11 | Andreas Kyburz | Switzerland | 14:58.2 |
| 12 | Yannick Michiels | Belgium | 15:06.3 |
| 13 | Pavlo Ushkvarok | Ukraine | 15:06.7 |
| 14 | Jonas Vytautas Gvildys | Lithuania | 15:13.6 |
| 15 | Tuomo Mäkelä | Finland | 15:17.9 |
| 16 | Kristian Jones | Great Britain | 15:18.8 |
| 17 | Gustav Bergman | Sweden | 15:19.9 |
| 18 | Bjørn Ekeberg | Norway | 15:21.8 |
| 19 | Petteri Muukkonen | Finland | 15:23.2 |
| 20 | Oleksandr Kratov | Ukraine | 15:24.3 |
| 21 | Carl Waaler Kaas | Norway | 15:24.6 |
| 22 | Martin Hubmann | Switzerland | 15:25.5 |
| 23 | Gernot Kerschbaumer | Austria | 15:25.6 |
| 24 | Kiril Nikolov | Bulgaria | 15:32.4 |
| 25 | Robert Merl | Austria | 15:35.0 |
| 26 | Andreas Boesen | Denmark | 15:38.6 |
| 27 | Vincent Coupat | France | 15:49.2 |
| 28 | Ivan Sirakov | Bulgaria | 15:50.1 |
| 29 | Roman Ryapolov | Russia | 15:56.8 |
| 30 | Simon Uppill | Australia | 15:58.0 |
| 31 | Ivaylo Kamenarov | Bulgaria | 16:00.3 |
| 32 | Wojciech Kowalski | Poland | 16:00.8 |
| 33 | Andreu Blanes | Spain | 16:06.6 |
| 34 | João Figueiredo | Portugal | 16:07.2 |
| 35 | Pieter Hendrickx | Belgium | 16:07.6 |
| 36 | Artūrs Pauliņš | Latvia | 16:08.5 |
| 37 | Milos Nykodym | Czech Republic | 16:17.7 |
| 38 | Mārtiņš Sirmais | Latvia | 16:18.6 |
| 39 | Máté Baumholczer | Hungary | 16:18.9 |
| 40 | Antonio Martínez | Spain | 16:24.0 |
| 41 | Christian Wartbichler | Austria | 16:31.8 |
| 42 | Alexander Lubina | Germany | 16:43.5 |
| 43 | Frédéric Tranchand | France | 16:54.9 |
| 44 | Marc Serrallonga | Spain | 16:59.2 |
| 45 | Kenny Kivikas | Estonia | 17:20.1 |
| | Vilius Aleliunas | Lithuania | DQ |

==== Women's sprint ====
WOC 2013 – Sprint final – Women (3.4 km)
| Rank | Competitor | Nation | Time |
|---|---|---|---|
| 1st place, gold medalist(s) | Simone Niggli | Switzerland | 14:10.6 |
| 2nd place, silver medalist(s) | Annika Billstam | Sweden | 14:18.7 |
| 3rd place, bronze medalist(s) | Venla Niemi | Finland | 14:48.5 |
| 4 | Maja Alm | Denmark | 14:53.0 |
| 5 | Tessa Hill | Great Britain | 14:58.2 |
| 6 | Galina Vinogradova | Russia | 15:04.3 |
| 7 | Emma Klingenberg | Denmark | 15:08.9 |
| 8 | Merja Rantanen | Finland | 15:15.9 |
| 9 | Heidi Østlid Bagstevold | Norway | 15:20.8 |
| 10 | Anne Margrethe Hausken Nordberg | Norway | 15:22.8 |
| 11 | Nadiya Volynska | Ukraine | 15:34.5 |
| 12 | Lina Strand | Sweden | 15:35.0 |
| 13 | Iveta Duchova | Czech Republic | 15:38.4 |
| 14 | Lizzie Ingham | New Zealand | 15:39.6 |
| 15 | Olga Reznichenko | Ukraine | 15:49.3 |
| 16 | Rahel Friederich | Switzerland | 15:53.9 |
| 17 | Lea Vercellotti | France | 15:54.3 |
| 18 | Irina Nyberg | Russia | 15:54.7 |
| 19 | Ausrine Kutkaite | Lithuania | 15:54.9 |
| 20 | Sarah Rollins | Great Britain | 16:01.5 |
| 21 | Sabine Hauswirth | Switzerland | 16:07.5 |
| 22 | Tereza Novotna | Czech Republic | 16:10.1 |
| 23 | Ursula Kadan | Austria | 16:12.6 |
| 24 | Alva Olsson | Sweden | 16:15.6 |
| 25 | Alison Crocker | United States | 16:16.7 |
| 26 | Ekaterina Nikitina | Russia | 16:21.0 |
| 27 | Annika Rihma | Estonia | 16:24.7 |
| 28 | Gabija Ražaitytė | Lithuania | 16:33.0 |
| 29 | Miek Fabré | Belgium | 16:33.3 |
| 30 | Kristina Rybakovaitė | Lithuania | 16:51.1 |
| 31 | Felicity Brown | Australia | 16:53.8 |
| 32 | Vanessa Round | Australia | 16:56.4 |
| 33 | Paulina Faron | Poland | 16:57.5 |
| 34 | Elisa Elstner | Austria | 17:00.2 |
| 35 | Celine Dodin | France | 17:09.3 |
| 36 | Fanni Gyurkó | Hungary | 17:12.5 |
| 37 | Laura Vīķe | Latvia | 17:31.3 |
| 38 | Carlotta Scalet | Italy | 17:37.6 |
| 39 | Yingwei Wang | China | 17:52.3 |
| 40 | Christine Kirchlechner | Italy | 17:55.5 |
| 41 | Nataliya Dimitrova | Bulgaria | 18:07.3 |
| 42 | Jasmine Neve | Australia | 18:36.5 |
| 43 | Alicia Cobo | Spain | 20:02.0 |
| | Michela Guizzardi | Italy | DQ |
| | Judith Wyder | Switzerland | DQ |

=== Middle distance ===
The middle distance finals were held on 12 July 2013 at Koulurinne, Vuokatti.

==== Men's middle distance ====
WOC 2013 – Middle distance final – Men (6.3 km)
| Rank | Competitor | Nation | Time |
|---|---|---|---|
| 1st place, gold medalist(s) | Leonid Novikov | Russia | 37:45 |
| 2nd place, silver medalist(s) | Thierry Gueorgiou | France | 37:54 |
| 3rd place, bronze medalist(s) | Gustav Bergman | Sweden | 38:21 |
| 4 | Matthias Kyburz | Switzerland | 39:08 |
| 5 | Daniel Hubmann | Switzerland | 39:16 |
| 5 | Fabian Hertner | Switzerland | 39:16 |
| 7 | Carl Waaler Kaas | Norway | 39:21 |
| 8 | Edgars Bertuks | Latvia | 39:51 |
| 9 | Denys Sherbakov | Ukraine | 39:59 |
| 10 | Peter Öberg | Sweden | 40:22 |
| 11 | Oleksandr Kratov | Ukraine | 40:30 |
| 12 | Mārtiņš Sirmais | Latvia | 40:33 |
| 13 | Lauri Sild | Estonia | 41:02 |
| 14 | Johan Runesson | Sweden | 41:08 |
| 15 | Gernot Kerschbaumer | Austria | 41:10 |
| 16 | Anders Nordberg | Norway | 41:42 |
| 16 | Valentin Novikov | Russia | 41:42 |
| 18 | Zsolt Lenkei | Hungary | 41:46 |
| 19 | Olle Kärner | Estonia | 42:20 |
| 20 | Tomáš Dlabaja | Czech Republic | 42:22 |
| 21 | Jan Procházka | Czech Republic | 42:28 |
| 22 | Tue Lassen | Denmark | 42:44 |
| 23 | Hannu Airila | Finland | 42:46 |
| 24 | Jonas Vytautas Gvildys | Lithuania | 42:51 |
| 25 | Rasmus Thrane Hansen | Denmark | 42:54 |
| 26 | Robert Merl | Austria | 42:56 |
| 27 | Pavlo Ushkvarok | Ukraine | 43:11 |
| 28 | Philippe Adamski | France | 43:24 |
| 29 | Bjørn Ekeberg | Norway | 43:32 |
| 30 | Alexey Bortnik | Russia | 44:01 |
| 31 | Andreu Blanes | Spain | 44:03 |
| 32 | Mikhail Mamleev | Italy | 44:26 |
| 33 | Simon Uppill | Australia | 44:55 |
| 34 | Simonas Krėpšta | Lithuania | 45:39 |
| 35 | Michal Krajčík | Slovakia | 45:54 |
| 36 | Hector Haines | Great Britain | 46:50 |
| 37 | Christoph Prunsche | Germany | 47:16 |
| 38 | Roger Casal | Spain | 47:31 |
| 39 | Daniel Barkasz | Romania | 47:43 |
| 40 | Kalvis Mihailovs | Latvia | 47:56 |
| 41 | Mateusz Wenslaw | Poland | 48:24 |
| 42 | Pavel Gvozdev | Israel | 48:44 |
| 43 | Timo Sild | Estonia | 48:46 |
| 44 | Tiago Aires | Portugal | 51:17 |
| | Mark Nixon | Great Britain | DNF |

==== Women's middle distance ====
WOC 2013 – Middle distance final – Women (5.0 km)
| Rank | Competitor | Nation | Time |
|---|---|---|---|
| 1st place, gold medalist(s) | Simone Niggli | Switzerland | 35:25 |
| 2nd place, silver medalist(s) | Tove Alexandersson | Sweden | 37:10 |
| 3rd place, bronze medalist(s) | Merja Rantanen | Finland | 37:59 |
| 4 | Minna Kauppi | Finland | 38:39 |
| 5 | Irina Nyberg | Russia | 38:45 |
| 6 | Annika Billstam | Sweden | 38:49 |
| 7 | Amélie Chataing | France | 38:50 |
| 7 | Tatyana Riabkina | Russia | 38:50 |
| 9 | Anne Margrethe Hausken Nordberg | Norway | 38:56 |
| 10 | Maja Alm | Denmark | 39:13 |
| 11 | Ida Bobach | Denmark | 39:43 |
| 12 | Inga Dambe | Latvia | 39:46 |
| 13 | Judith Wyder | Switzerland | 39:50 |
| 14 | Venla Niemi | Finland | 40:03 |
| 15 | Ausrine Kutkaite | Lithuania | 40:24 |
| 16 | Nadiya Volynska | Ukraine | 40:30 |
| 17 | Vendula Haldin | Czech Republic | 40:42 |
| 18 | Tone Wigemyr | Norway | 40:45 |
| 19 | Mari Fasting | Norway | 41:10 |
| 20 | Saila Kinni | Finland | 41:13 |
| 21 | Hollie Orr | Great Britain | 41:39 |
| 22 | Sara Lüscher | Switzerland | 41:48 |
| 23 | Ursula Kadan | Austria | 41:54 |
| 24 | Dana Brožková | Czech Republic | 42:01 |
| 25 | Eva Juřeníková | Czech Republic | 42:09 |
| 26 | Emily Kemp | Canada | 42:43 |
| 27 | Lina Strand | Sweden | 42:45 |
| 28 | Claire Ward | Great Britain | 43:01 |
| 29 | Alison Crocker | United States | 44:49 |
| 30 | Anu Åkerman | Estonia | 45:34 |
| 31 | Olga Reznichenko | Ukraine | 45:49 |
| 32 | Charlotte Bouchet | France | 46:36 |
| 33 | Hanny Allston | Australia | 46:38 |
| 34 | Paulina Faron | Poland | 47:24 |
| 35 | Elisa Elstner | Austria | 47:31 |
| 36 | Indrė Valaite | Lithuania | 47:53 |
| 37 | Tessa Hill | Great Britain | 48:46 |
| 38 | Christiane Tröße | Germany | 49:08 |
| 39 | Laura Vīķe | Latvia | 49:19 |
| 40 | Annabel Valledor | Spain | 50:05 |
| 41 | Louise Oram | Canada | 50:09 |
| 42 | Michela Guizzardi | Italy | 53:07 |
| 43 | Vanessa Round | Australia | 53:20 |
| 44 | Jasmine Neve | Australia | 54:28 |
| 45 | Hinako Inage | Japan | 1:01:24 |

=== Long distance ===
The long distance finals were held on 9 July 2013 at Kumpula, Sotkamo.

==== Men's long distance ====
WOC 2013 – Long distance final – Men (19.8 km)
| Rank | Competitor | Nation | Time |
|---|---|---|---|
| 1st place, gold medalist(s) | Thierry Gueorgiou | France | 1:41:39 |
| 2nd place, silver medalist(s) | Jani Lakanen | Finland | 1:42:57 |
| 3rd place, bronze medalist(s) | Edgars Bertuks | Latvia | 1:43:29 |
| 4 | Dmitriy Tsvetkov | Russia | 1:43:43 |
| 5 | Magne Daehli | Norway | 1:43:57 |
| 6 | Matthias Merz | Switzerland | 1:44:20 |
| 7 | Daniel Hubmann | Switzerland | 1:44:48 |
| 8 | Tue Lassen | Denmark | 1:46:21 |
| 9 | Kiril Nikolov | Bulgaria | 1:46:40 |
| 9 | Valentin Novikov | Russia | 1:46:40 |
| 11 | Anders Holmberg | Sweden | 1:47:03 |
| 12 | Philippe Adamski | France | 1:47:36 |
| 13 | Anders Nordberg | Norway | 1:47:40 |
| 14 | Fredrik Johansson | Sweden | 1:47:58 |
| 15 | Simonas Krėpšta | Lithuania | 1:48:11 |
| 16 | Jan Šedivý | Czech Republic | 1:48:15 |
| 17 | Tero Föhr | Finland | 1:48:37 |
| 18 | Stepan Kodeda | Czech Republic | 1:48:55 |
| 19 | Timo Sild | Estonia | 1:49:53 |
| 20 | Ralph Street | Great Britain | 1:50:19 |
| 21 | Vilius Aleliunas | Lithuania | 1:50:37 |
| 22 | Hans Gunnar Omdal | Norway | 1:50:44 |
| 23 | Yury Tambasov | Belarus | 1:51:42 |
| 24 | Simo-Pekka Fincke | Finland | 1:51:45 |
| 25 | Leonid Novikov | Russia | 1:51:52 |
| 25 | Artem Panchenko | Ukraine | 1:51:52 |
| 27 | Peeter Pihl | Estonia | 1:53:04 |
| 28 | Zsolt Lenkei | Hungary | 1:53:09 |
| 29 | Jan Petržela | Czech Republic | 1:53:47 |
| 30 | Baptiste Rollier | Switzerland | 1:54:51 |
| 31 | Sören Lösch | Germany | 1:55:40 |
| 32 | Aleksei Alekseyonok | Belarus | 1:57:11 |
| 33 | Nicolas Simonin | Ireland | 1:57:13 |
| 34 | Søren Schwartz Sørensen | Denmark | 1:57:44 |
| 35 | Mikhail Mamleev | Italy | 1:58:17 |
| 36 | Tiago Aires | Portugal | 1:58:44 |
| 37 | Diogo Miguel | Portugal | 1:58:45 |
| 38 | Kalvis Mihailovs | Latvia | 1:59:44 |
| 39 | Johan Runesson | Sweden | 2:00:29 |
| 40 | Jānis Kūms | Latvia | 2:02:35 |
| 41 | Markus Lang | Austria | 2:04:25 |
| 42 | Roger Casal | Spain | 2:05:43 |
| 43 | Mateusz Wenslaw | Poland | 2:07:02 |
| 44 | Pavel Gvozdev | Israel | 2:11:10 |
| 45 | Andrey Salin | Belarus | 2:26:32 |

==== Women's long distance ====
WOC 2013 – Long distance final – Women (13.9 km)
| Rank | Competitor | Nation | Time |
|---|---|---|---|
| 1st place, gold medalist(s) | Simone Niggli | Switzerland | 1:20:02 |
| 2nd place, silver medalist(s) | Tove Alexandersson | Sweden | 1:23:01 |
| 3rd place, bronze medalist(s) | Lena Eliasson | Sweden | 1:23:08 |
| 4 | Minna Kauppi | Finland | 1:23:44 |
| 5 | Tatyana Riabkina | Russia | 1:23:45 |
| 6 | Anni-Maija Fincke | Finland | 1:25:51 |
| 7 | Emma Johansson | Sweden | 1:26:32 |
| 8 | Mari Fasting | Norway | 1:26:40 |
| 9 | Tone Wigemyr | Norway | 1:28:06 |
| 10 | Catherine Taylor | Great Britain | 1:28:11 |
| 11 | Ida Bobach | Denmark | 1:28:46 |
| 12 | Eva Juřeníková | Czech Republic | 1:29:26 |
| 13 | Dana Brožková | Czech Republic | 1:29:41 |
| 14 | Amélie Chataing | France | 1:31:01 |
| 15 | Sara Lüscher | Switzerland | 1:31:27 |
| 16 | Anastasiya Tikhonova | Russia | 1:31:28 |
| 17 | Natalia Efimova | Russia | 1:31:37 |
| 18 | Alison Crocker | United States | 1:32:30 |
| 19 | Aija Skrastiņa | Latvia | 1:33:03 |
| 20 | Sarina Jenzer | Switzerland | 1:34:05 |
| 21 | Inga Dambe | Latvia | 1:34:53 |
| 22 | Hanny Allston | Australia | 1:35:17 |
| 23 | Ines Brodmann | Switzerland | 1:35:48 |
| 24 | Rasa Ptašekaitė | Lithuania | 1:36:56 |
| 25 | Emily Kemp | Canada | 1:38:03 |
| 26 | Gabija Ražaitytė | Lithuania | 1:38:13 |
| 27 | Helen Palmer | Great Britain | 1:38:37 |
| 28 | Līga Ārniece | Latvia | 1:39:33 |
| 29 | Anu Åkerman | Estonia | 1:39:38 |
| 30 | Olga Sluta | Ukraine | 1:41:05 |
| 31 | Indrė Valaite | Lithuania | 1:43:22 |
| 32 | Nataliya Dimitrova | Bulgaria | 1:44:50 |
| 33 | Miek Fabré | Belgium | 1:45:08 |
| 34 | Kirti Rebane | Estonia | 1:46:26 |
| 35 | Michaela Omová | Czech Republic | 1:46:52 |
| 36 | Ursula Kadan | Austria | 1:48:20 |
| 37 | Anastasia Kruglenia | Belarus | 1:49:19 |
| 38 | Daria Lajn | Poland | 1:50:19 |
| 39 | Alicia Cobo | Spain | 1:52:33 |
| 40 | Karoliina Sundberg | Finland | 1:53:51 |
| 41 | Anna Serrallonga | Spain | 1:55:30 |
| 42 | Maryna Suzdalova | Ukraine | 1:56:29 |
| 43 | Louise Oram | Canada | 1:56:50 |
| 44 | Michela Guizzardi | Italy | 1:58:03 |
| | Emma Klingenberg | Denmark | DQ |

=== Relay ===
The relay events were held on 13 July 2013 at Koulurinne, Vuokatti.

==== Men's relay ====
WOC 2013 – Relay – Men (5.2 + 5.2 + 5.6 km)
| Rank | Nation | Competitors | Time |
|---|---|---|---|
| 1st place, gold medalist(s) | Russia | Leonid Novikov, Valentin Novikov, Dmitriy Tsvetkov | 1:41:47 |
| 2nd place, silver medalist(s) | Sweden | Anders Holmberg, Peter Öberg, Gustav Bergman | 1:42:47 |
| 3rd place, bronze medalist(s) | Ukraine | Pavlo Ushkvarok, Oleksandr Kratov, Denys Sherbakov | 1:42:55 |
| 4 | Switzerland | Matthias Merz, Daniel Hubmann, Matthias Kyburz | 1:43:39 |
| 5 | Finland | Mårten Boström, Jani Lakanen, Tero Föhr | 1:44:55 |
| 6 | Norway | Øystein Kvaal Østerbø, Carl Waaler Kaas, Magne Daehli | 1:45:00 |
| 7 | Estonia | Olle Kärner, Timo Sild, Lauri Sild | 1:45:50 |
| 8 | France | Frederic Tranchand, Philippe Adamski, Thierry Gueorgiou | 1:46:20 |
| 9 | Czech Republic | Tomáš Dlabaja, Jan Šedivý, Jan Procházka | 1:46:56 |
| 10 | Austria | Gernot Kerschbaumer, Helmut Gremmel, Robert Merl | 1:50:14 |
| 11 | Great Britain | Murray Strain, Hector Haines, Ralph Street | 1:50:21 |
| 12 | Latvia | Kalvis Mihailovs, Mārtiņš Sirmais, Edgars Bertuks | 1:50:23 |
| 13 | Italy | Klaus Schgaguler, Alessio Tenani, Mikhail Mamleev | 1:50:37 |
| 14 | Spain | Antonio Martínez, Roger Casal, Andreu Blanes | 1:57:29 |
| 15 | Hungary | Zsolt Lenkei, Máté Baumholczer, Máté Kerényi | 1:57:34 |
| 16 | Lithuania | Vilius Aleliunas, Simonas Krėpšta, Jonas Vytautas Gvildys | 1:58:00 |
| 17 | Bulgaria | Ivan Sirakov, Ivaylo Kamenarov, Kiril Nikolov | 1:58:10 |
| 18 | Denmark | Rasmus Thrane Hansen, Andreas Boesen, Søren Schwartz Sørensen | 2:01:01 |
| 19 | Belarus | Aleksei Alekseyonok, Yury Tambasov, Andrey Salin | 2:04:24 |
| 20 | Australia | Simon Uppill, Joshua Blatchford, Bryan Keely | 2:04:27 |
| 21 | Ireland | Nicolas Simonin, Darren Burke, Neil Dobbs | 2:07:52 |
| 22 | Germany | Christoph Brandt, Bjarne Friedrichs, Sören Lösch | 2:09:22 |
| 23 | Poland | Mateusz Wenslaw, Wojciech Dwojak, Wojciech Kowalski | 2:10:55 |
| 24 | Portugal | Diogo Miguel, Miguel Silva, Tiago Aires | 2:12:37 |
| 25 | Canada | Will Critchley, Robbie Anderson, Eric Kemp | 2:15:46 |
| 26 | New Zealand | Ross Morrison, Tane Cambridge, Tim Robertson | 2:19:45 |
| 27 | United States | Eric Bone, Boris Granovskiy, Ross Smith | 2:23:46 |
| 28 | Israel | Pavel Gvozdev, Guy Sabo-Bar, Alexey Marchenko | 2:25:21 |
| 29 | Belgium | Tomas Hendrickx, Pieter Hendrickx, Yannick Michiels | 2:28:27 |
| 30 | Moldova | Roman Ciobanu, Igori Postica, Ivan Fomiciov | 2:42:41 |
| 31 | Hong Kong | Tsz Wai Yu, Kin Wai Lee, Gerald Yip | 3:12:13 |
| 32 | China | Xiyuan Liang, Yefeng Luo, Qiaoping Li | 3:42:33 |
| | Japan | Hirokazu Osaki, Yuta Tanikawa, Yoichi Shimbo | DQ |

==== Women's relay ====
WOC 2013 – Relay – Women (4.2 + 4.2 + 4.4 km)
| Rank | Nation | Competitors | Time |
|---|---|---|---|
| 1st place, gold medalist(s) | Norway | Heidi Bagstevold, Mari Fasting, Anne M. Hausken Nordberg | 1:37:53 |
| 2nd place, silver medalist(s) | Finland | Venla Niemi, Anni-Maija Fincke, Minna Kauppi | 1:39:07 |
| 3rd place, bronze medalist(s) | Switzerland | Sara Lüscher, Judith Wyder, Simone Niggli | 1:43:44 |
| 4 | Sweden | Emma Johansson, Annika Billstam, Tove Alexandersson | 1:43:58 |
| 5 | Czech Republic | Vendula Haldin, Eva Juřeníková, Dana Brožková | 1:45:48 |
| 6 | Russia | Galina Vinogradova, Irina Nyberg, Tatyana Riabkina | 1:46:29 |
| 7 | Denmark | Maja Alm, Ida Bobach, Emma Klingenberg | 1:48:27 |
| 8 | Great Britain | Catherine Taylor, Hollie Orr, Claire Ward | 1:53:54 |
| 9 | Ukraine | Anastasiia Danylova, Olga Reznichenko, Nadiya Volynska | 1:54:03 |
| 10 | Lithuania | Gabija Ražaitytė, Indrė Valaite, Ausrine Kutkaite | 1:56:11 |
| 11 | Italy | Carlotta Scalet, Christine Kirchlechner, Michela Guizzardi | 1:59:44 |
| 12 | Latvia | Līga Ārniece, Inga Dambe, Aija Skrastiņa | 2:00:23 |
| 13 | Australia | Vanessa Round, Aislinn Prendergast, Hanny Allston | 2:01:05 |
| 14 | France | Lea Vercellotti, Charlotte Bouchet, Amélie Chataing | 2:02:16 |
| 15 | Estonia | Kirti Rebane, Annika Rihma, Anu Åkerman | 2:02:22 |
| 16 | Austria | Anna Nilsson-Simkovics, Elisa Elstner, Ursula Kadan | 2:04:13 |
| 17 | Poland | Daria Lajn, Maria Pabich, Paulina Faron | 2:10:31 |
| 18 | Germany | Esther Doetsch, Christiane Tröße, Sieglinde Kundisch | 2:11:27 |
| 19 | United States | Alison Crocker, Samantha Saeger, Hannah Culberg | 2:11:44 |
| 20 | Canada | Emily Kemp, Louise Oram, Kerstin Burnett | 2:13:57 |
| 21 | New Zealand | Lara Prince, Kate Morrison, Lizzie Ingham | 2:25:08 |
| 22 | China | Mingyue Zhu, Jieling Zhou, Yingwei Wang | 2:25:40 |
| 23 | Spain | Anna Serrallonga, Annabel Valledor, Alicia Cobo | 2:35:26 |
| 24 | Japan | Hinako Inage, Saho Miyakawa, Natsuki Yamagishi | 2:52:14 |
| 25 | Ireland | Niamh O'Boyle, Rosalind Hussey, Susan Lambe | 3:29:46 |
| 26 | Hong Kong | Tsz Ying Yu, Wai Lan Iris Lui, Sophia Tam Kar Bik | 3:32:44 |
