= Venla Niemi =

Finnish orienteering competitor

Venla Harju
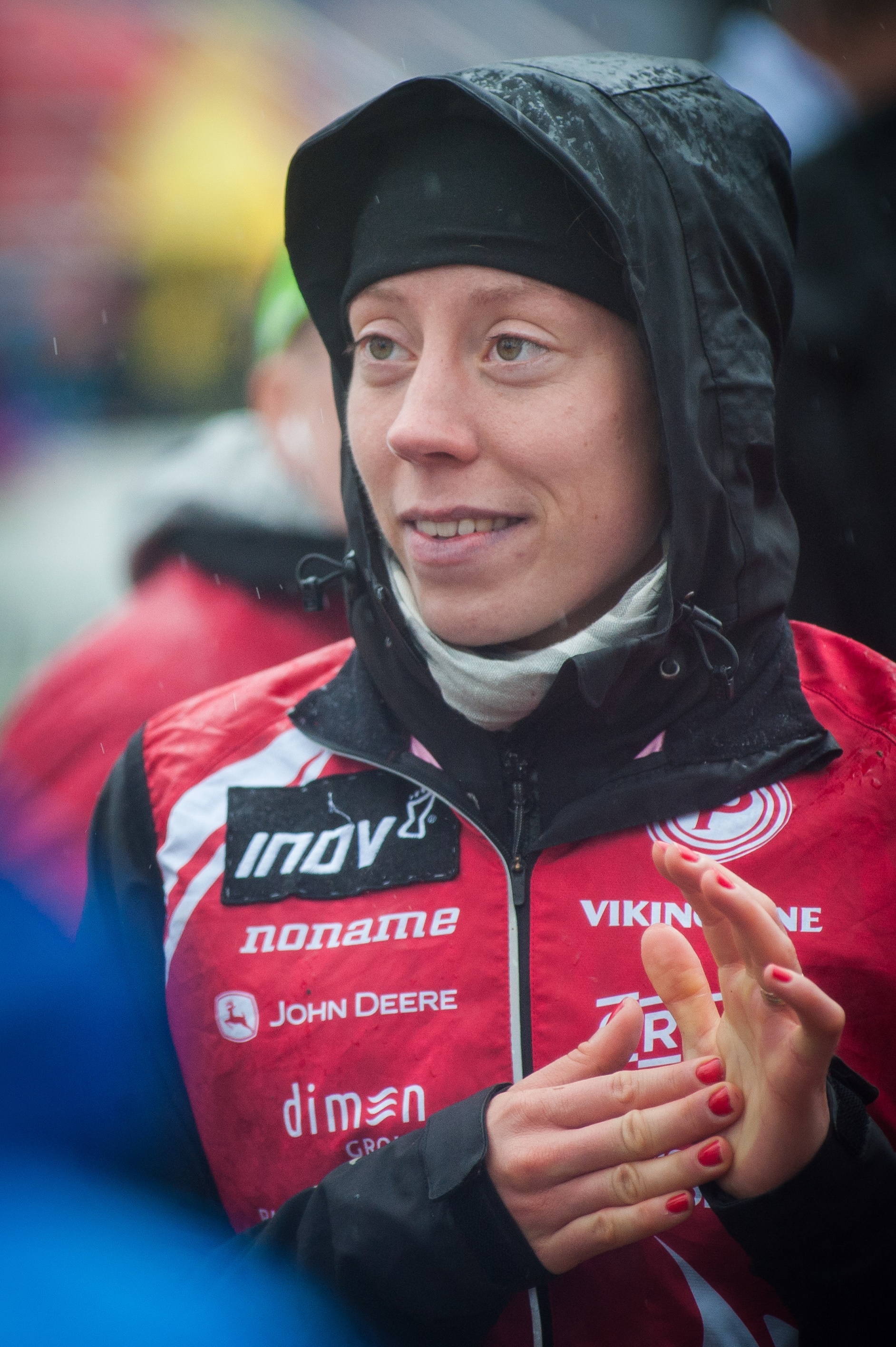
- Harju at the 2016 Jukola relay.

Personal information
- Born: 10 July 1990 (age 35)

Sport
- Sport: Orienteering
Medal record
Women's orienteering
Representing Finland
World Championships
Silver medal – second place	2013 Vuokatti	Relay
Silver medal – second place	2024 Edinburgh	Sprint relay
Bronze medal – third place	2013 Vuokatti	Sprint
Bronze medal – third place	2017 Tartu	Middle
Bronze medal – third place	2017 Tartu	Relay
Bronze medal – third place	2019 Østfold	Middle
Junior World Championships
Gold medal – first place	2008 Göteborg	Middle

Venla Niemi (aka Venla Harju; born 10 July 1990) is a Finnish orienteering competitor.

She became Junior World Champion in the middle distance in Gothenburg in 2008, ahead of silver medalist Beata Falk.

She competed at the 2012 World Orienteering Championships. In the sprint competition she qualified for the final, where she placed sixth.

At the 2017 World Orienteering Championships in Tartu, Estonia, Harju placed fourth in the sprint final, and won a bronze medal in the middle distance (behind Tove Alexandersson and Marianne Andersen).
