= Mari Fasting =

Norwegian orienteer and ski mountaineer

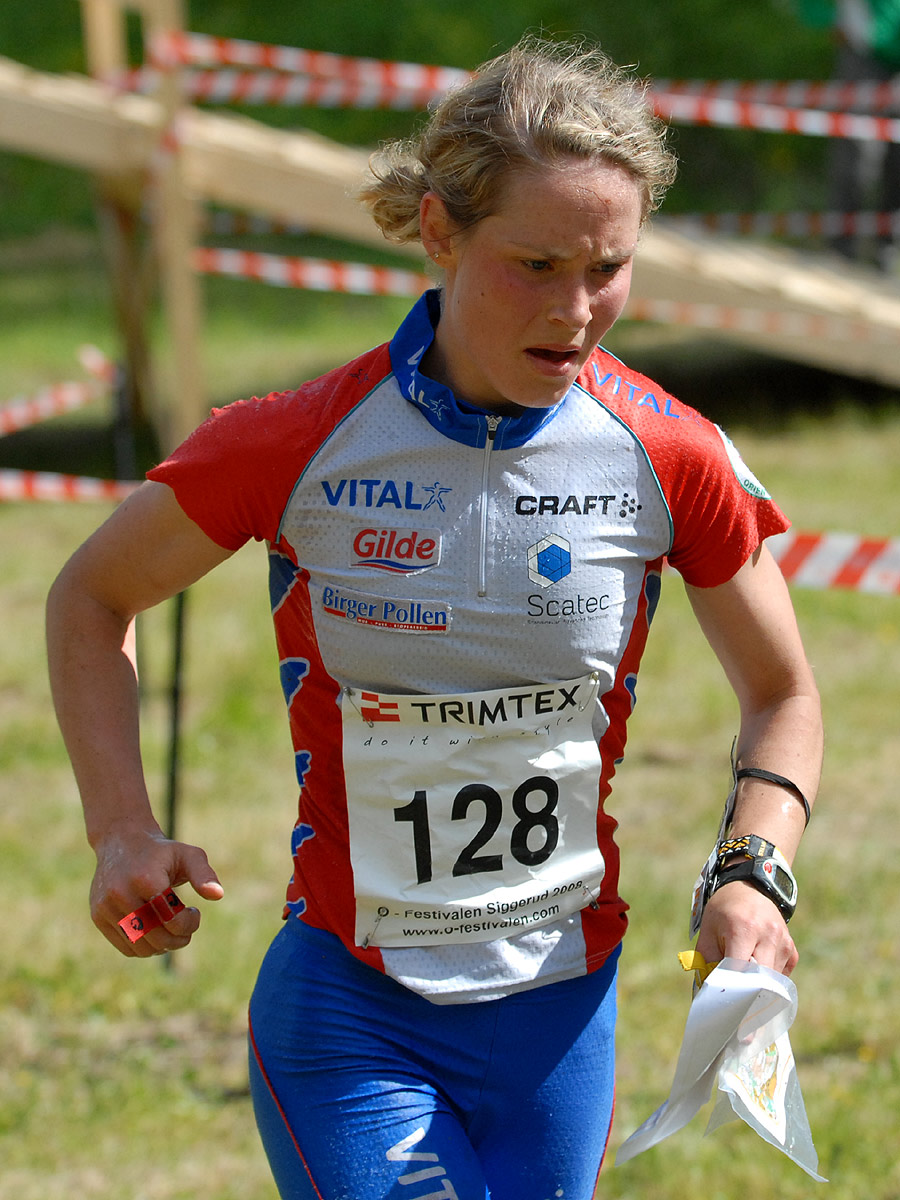
- Mari Fasting (Siggerud 2008)

Personal information
- Born: 1 March 1985 (age 41)

Sport
- Sport: orienteering; ski mountaineering
- Club: NTNUI; Halden SK
Medal record
Women's orienteering
Representing Norway
World Championships
| Gold medal – first place | 2013 Vuokatti | Relay |
| Silver medal – second place | 2015 Inverness | Long |
| Silver medal – second place | 2015 Inverness | Relay |
| Bronze medal – third place | 2012 Lausanne | Relay |
World Games
| Bronze medal – third place | 2009 Kaohsiung | Mixed relay |
Junior World Championships
| Gold medal – first place | 2005 Tenero | Long distance |
| Gold medal – first place | 2005 Tenero | Relay |

Mari Fasting (born 1 March 1985) is a Norwegian orienteering competitor and ski mountaineer. She is a two-time Junior World Orienteering Champion. She represents the club NTNUI of Trondheim, and is related to the ski mountaineer Ola Berger.

== Junior career ==
Mari Fasting competed at the 2005 Junior World Orienteering Championships in Tenero, where she received a gold medal in the long distance and a gold medal in the relay event.

== Senior career ==
Fasting participated at the 2006 World Orienteering Championships in Aarhus, where she finished 6th in the middle distance. She was injured for a large part of the 2007 season, and missed the world championship. At the 2008 European Orienteering Championships in Ventspils she finished 4th in the relay event with the Norwegian national team.

She competed at the 2013 World Orienteering Championships, and won a gold medal in the relay with the Norwegian team, together with Heidi Bagstevold and Anne Margrethe Hausken Nordberg.

== Ski mountaineering ==
- 2011:
  - 8th, World Championship relay, together with Ingvild Ryggen Carstens and Malene Haukøy
  - 10th, World Championship vertical race
