= Alva Olsson =

Swedish orienteering competitor

Personal information
- Born: 1989 (age 36–37) Västerås, Sweden

Sport
- Sport: Orienteering
- Club: Linköpings OK
Medal record
Women's orienteering
Representing Sweden
European Championships
| Silver medal – second place | 2014 Palmela | Relay |

Alva Olsson (born 1989) is a Swedish orienteering competitor She was born in Västerås. She competed at the 2013 World Orienteering Championships in Vuokatti, where she qualified for the sprint final. She won a silver medal in the relay at the 2014 European Orienteering Championships in Portugal, with the Swedish team.
