= Irina Nyberg =

Russian orienteering competitor

Personal information
- Born: 1983 (age 42–43) Novocheboksarsk, Russia

Sport
- Sport: Orienteering
- Club: Moscow Orienta (RUS); Hellas (SWE)
Medal record
Women's orienteering
Representing Russia
European Championships
Bronze medal – third place	2014 Palmela	Relay

Irina Nyberg (Russian: Ирина Нюберг; born 1983) is a Russian orienteering competitor. She was born in Novocheboksarsk. She competed at the 2013 World Orienteering Championships in Vuokatti, where she placed fifth in the middle distance, sixth in the relay, and 18th in the sprint. She won a bronze medal in the relay at the 2014 European Orienteering Championships in Portugal, with the Russian team.
