= Boesen =

Boesen is a surname. Notable people with the surname include:

- Anders Boesen (born 1976), Danish badminton player
- Andreas Boesen (born 1991), Danish orienteer
- Connie Boesen, (born 1951), American politician
- Lasse Boesen (born 1979), Danish team handball player
- Thecla Boesen (1910–1996), Danish film actress
