= Heidi Bagstevold =

Norwegian orienteer (born 1987)

Bagstevold, Heidi
Personal information
- Born: 10 July 1987 (age 38) Kongsberg, Norway
Medal record
Women's orienteering
Representing Norway
World Championships
Gold medal – first place	2013 Vuokatti	Relay
Silver medal – second place	2015 Inverness	Relay
Silver medal – second place	2016 Strömstad	Middle

Heidi Østlid Bagstevold (born 10 July 1987) is a Norwegian orienteering competitor.

== Orienteering career ==
Bagstevold competed at the 2013 World Orienteering Championships, and won a gold medal in the relay with the Norwegian team, together with Mari Fasting and Anne Margrethe Hausken Nordberg. She became national champion in the long distance in 2010, and in sprint in 2013.

She was born in Kongsberg, but lives in Fredrikstad and represents Fredrikstad SK.
