= Pavlo Ushkvarok =

Ukrainian orienteering competitor (born 1983)

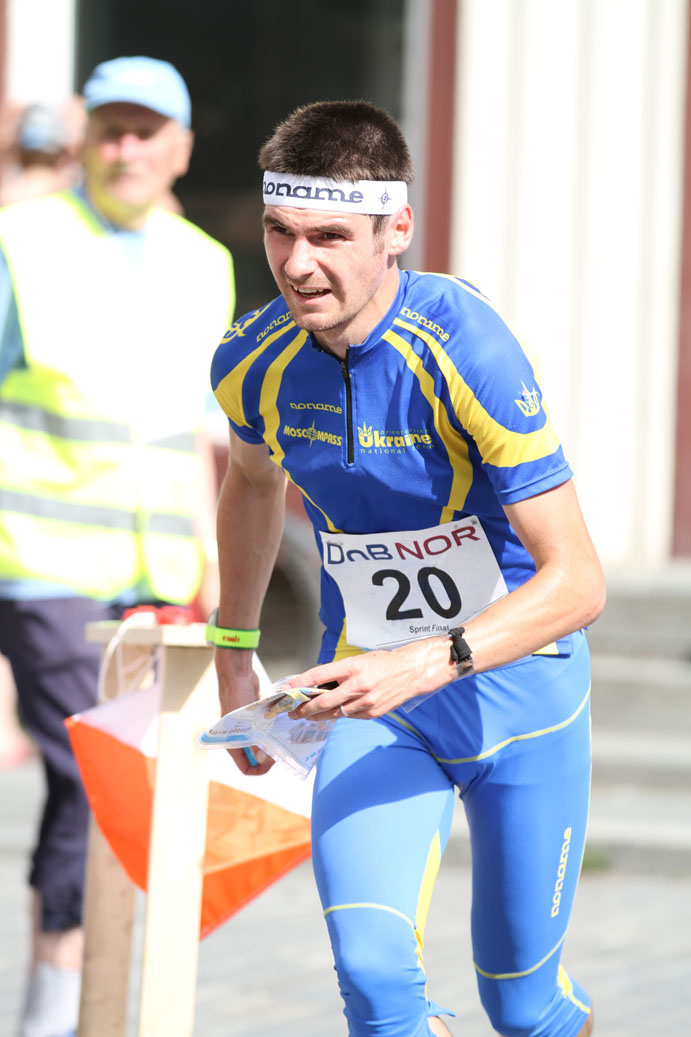

Medal record

Men's orienteering

Representing Ukraine

World Championships
Bronze medal – third place	2013 Vuokatti	Relay

Pavlo Ushkvarok (born 6 July 1983) is a Ukrainian orienteering competitor. He competed at the 2013 World Orienteering Championships, and won a bronze medal in the relay with the Ukrainian team.

He was born in Kharkiv and represents the club KSO O-Kompas in Ukraine and OK Denseln in Sweden.
