= Leonid Novikov =

Russian orienteering competitor

Personal information
- Born: 10 January 1984 (age 42) Belgorod, Russia
- Relative: Valentin Novikov (brother)
Medal record
Men's orienteering
Representing Russia
World Championships
Gold medal – first place	2013 Vuokatti	Relay
Gold medal – first place	2013 Vuokatti	Middle
Silver medal – second place	2017 Tartu	Long

Leonid Novikov (born 10 January 1984) is a Russian orienteering competitor. He won a gold medal in the middle distance at the 2013 World Orienteering Championships. and a silver medal in the long distance at the 2017 world championships.

He was born in Belgorod and represents the club Spartak. Leonid is the younger brother of fellow orienteer Valentin Novikov. Novikov won the Jukola relay in 2008.
