= Oleksandr Kratov =

Ukrainian orienteering competitor

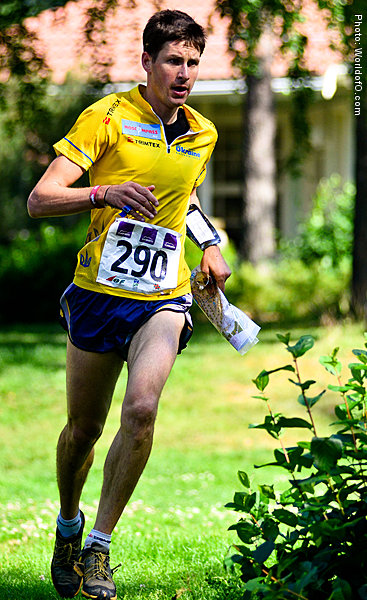
- Kratov in 2013

Medal record

Men's orienteering

Representing Ukraine

World Championships
| Bronze medal – third place | 2013 Vuokatti | Relay |
| Bronze medal – third place | 2014 Trentino | Middle |
| Bronze medal – third place | 2017 Tartu | Middle |

Oleksandr Kratov (born 31 March 1985) is a Ukrainian orienteering competitor. He competed at the 2013 World Orienteering Championships, and won a bronze medal in the relay with the Ukrainian team.

== Career ==
He was born in Feodosia, but represents the club KooVee in Finland. In 2008, he represented Turun metsänkävijät in Finland, and in 2008-2015 OK Orion in Sweden.

In 2014, Kratov won two World Cup stages: in Murcia (Spain) and Kongsberg (Norway). At the European Championships in Portugal, he finished sixth in the middle distance, and at the World Championships in Italy, he won a bronze medal in the middle distance, behind Olav Lundanes (Norway) and Fabian Hertner (Switzerland).

Since 2016, Alexander has been competing for the Finnish club Kovee. In the same year, he and his team won the Jukola night relay, and in 2018, he repeated this success.

At the 2017 World Championships in Estonia, he won another bronze medal in the middle distance, losing to Thierry Georgiou (France) and Fabian Hertner (Switzerland).
