= Mårten Boström =

Finnish orienteering competitor

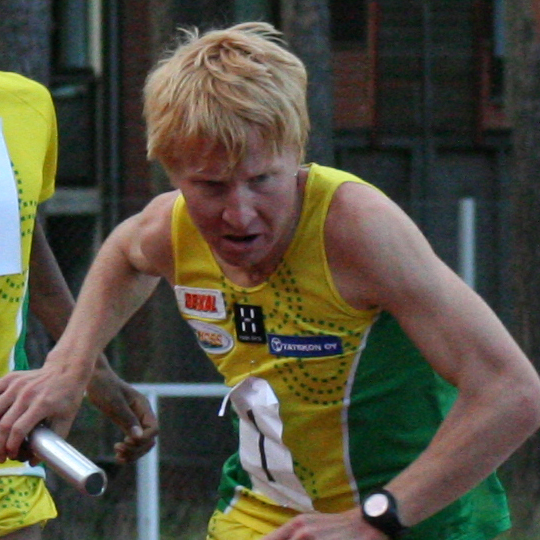

Medal record

Men's orienteering

Representing Finland

World Championships
| Gold medal – first place | 2013 Vuokatti | Sprint |

European Championships
| Bronze medal – third place | 2004 Roskilde | Sprint |

Junior World Championships
| Silver medal – second place | 2001 Miskolc | Classic |
| Bronze medal – third place | 2000 Nové Město na Moravě | Relay |

Mårten Boström (born 3 August 1982 in Kirkkonummi) is a Finnish orienteering competitor and long-distance runner. He won a gold medal in sprint at the 2013 World Orienteering Championships in Vuokatti. He reached the podium in the junior race at the Nordic Cross Country Championships in 2001, taking the bronze. He received a bronze medal in sprint at the 2004 European Orienteering Championships in Roskilde. He received a silver medal in the classic distance at the 2001 Junior World Orienteering Championships, and a bronze medal in the relay event in 2000. He won Jukola in 2004 and 2005.

In 2011 he won the Copenhagen Marathon with a time of 2:21:44.

== See also ==
- Finnish orienteers
- List of orienteers
- List of orienteering events
