= EuroBasket Women 2013 final =

EuroBasket Women 2013 Final
Spain	France
	1	2	3	4	Total
Spain	21	15	17	17	70
France	12	23	20	14	69
- Date: 30 June 2013
- Venue: Pévèle Arena, Orchies
- Attendance: 5,500

The EuroBasket Women 2013 final was played at the Pévèle Arena in Orchies, France, on 30 June 2013, between Spain and France.

== Road to the final ==
Spain
Round
France
Opponent
Result

Opponent
Result
Russia
77–72
Game 1
Latvia
62–39
Italy
71–69
Game 2
Serbia
76–32
Sweden
73–49
Game 3
Great Britain
79–47

Team	Pld	W	L	PF	PA	PD	Pts
Spain	3	3	0	221	180	+41	6
Sweden	3	1	2	180	194	−14	4
Italy	3	1	2	189	206	−17	4
Russia	3	1	2	201	211	−10	4

First Round

Team	Pld	W	L	PF	PA	PD	Pts
France	3	3	0	217	118	+99	6
Great Britain	3	2	1	192	203	−11	5
Serbia	3	1	2	162	208	−46	4
Latvia	3	0	3	151	193	−42	3

Opponent
Result

Opponent
Result
Slovakia
80–44
Game 1
Croatia
78–70
Montenegro
66–50
Game 2
Czech Republic
64–49
Turkey
61–48
Game 3
Belarus
58–50

Team	Pld	W	L	PF	PA	PD	Pts
Spain	5	5	0	351	250	+101	10
Turkey	5	4	1	318	263	+55	9
Italy	5	3	2	293	307	−14	8
Sweden	5	2	3	307	339	−32	7
Montenegro	5	1	4	302	330	−28	6
Slovakia	5	0	5	274	356	−82	5

Second Round

Team	Pld	W	L	PF	PA	PD	Pts
France	5	5	0	355	248	+107	10
Serbia	5	3	2	306	323	−17	8
Belarus	5	3	2	286	255	+31	8
Czech Republic	5	2	3	287	322	−35	7
Great Britain	5	2	3	324	363	−39	7
Croatia	5	0	5	324	371	−47	5

Opponent
Result

Opponent
Result
Czech Republic
75–58
Quarterfinals
Sweden
87–83
Serbia
88–69
Semifinals
Turkey
57–49

== Match details ==
30 June 2013
20:00

Boxscore

Spain	70–69	France
Scoring by quarter: 21–12, 15–23, 17–20, 17–14
Pts: Torrens 21; Rebs: Lyttle 11; Asts: Torrens 4		Pts: Gruda 25; Rebs: Miyem 7 Asts: Gomis 4

Pévèle Arena, Orchies
Attendance: 5,500
Referees: Ingus Baumanis (LAT), Jasmina Juras (SRB), Fabiana Martinescu (ROU)
