= Kalvis Mihailovs =

Latvian orienteering competitor (born 1988)

Personal information
- Born: 23 February 1988 (age 38)
Medal record
Men's orienteering
Representing Latvia
Junior World Championships
Bronze medal – third place	2007 Dubbo	Relay

Kalvis Mihailovs (born 23 February 1988) is a Latvian orienteering competitor.

He won a bronze medal in the relay at the 2007 Junior World Orienteering Championships in Dubbo. He competed at the 2012 World Orienteering Championships. In the middle distance he qualified for the final, where he placed 13th.
