= Indrė Valaitė =

Lithuanian orienteering competitor (born 1983)

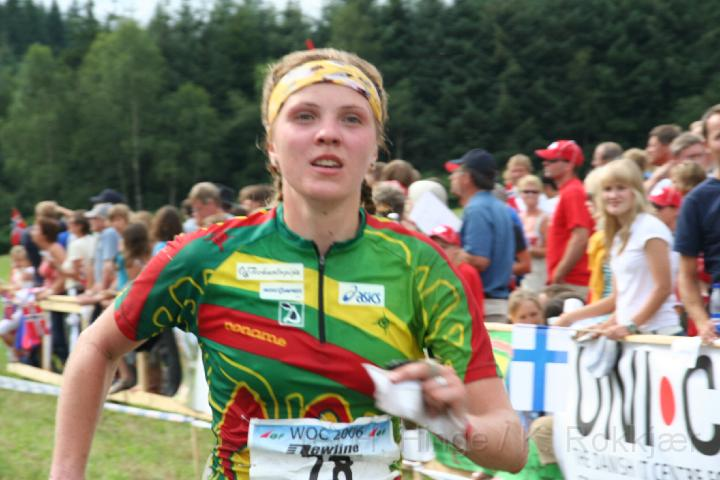
- WOC 2006

Medal record

Women's orienteering

Representing Lithuania

Junior World Championships
Silver medal – second place	2002 Alicante	Short

Indrė Valaitė (born April 15, 1983) is a Lithuanian orienteering competitor. She received a silver medal in the short course at the 2002 Junior World Orienteering Championships in Alicante.

Her best result at the senior world championships is an 8th place in the relay in Aarhus 2006. She participated in the Orienteering World Cup in 2006, 2007 and 2008.

== Other races ==
On April 2, 2023, Indrė competed in Paris marathon. She finished the course in 3h26'17", placing 560th among women.
