= Jan Kjellström International Festival of Orienteering =

Orienteering competition in the UK

The Jan Kjellström International Orienteering Festival or "JK" is the premier domestic orienteering competition in the United Kingdom along with the British Orienteering Championships, usually held over the Easter Weekend.

1967 saw the first JK event, held in memory of Jan Kjellström. The annual JK moved to Easter in 1969, and now regularly attracts a field of four thousand or more. The 1974 JK was the first British race to attract more than one thousand entrants. The JK Trophy is awarded to the winning team in the Men's Premier relay class.

== Races ==
Year	Region	Friday	Saturday	Sunday	Monday
1967	SEOA	-	Individual, Hindhead Common	?	-
1968	SEOA	-	Individual, Haslemere	-	-
1969	NEOA	-	Individual, Kielder Forest	Relay, Kielder Forest (Lewisburn Area)	-
1970	EMOA	-	Individual, Clumber Park	Relay, Shining Cliff	-
1971	SEOA	Training, Ranmore Common	Relay, Holmbury Hill	Individual, Leith Hill	Combined Harvester Race, Lower Bourne
1972	WMOA	Training, Staffordshire	Individual, Cannock Chase Park	Relay, Beaudesert	Warm down, Lea Wood
1973	SOA	Training, Loch Ard	Individual, South Achray	Relay, North Achray	Warm down, Balmaha
1974	SWOA	Training, Speech House Oaks, Forest of Dean	Individual, Speech House Oaks, Forest of Dean	Relay, Brierley South, Forest of Dean	Warm down, Forest of Dean
1975	SCOA	Training, N.W. Surrey	Individual, Star Posts, Bracknell	Relay, Hawley and Hornley	Warm down, Star Posts
1976	NWOA	Training, Western Lake District	Individual, Dalegarth, Eskdale	Relay, Dalegarth West, Eskdale	Warm down, Dalegarth West, Eskdale
1977	SEOA	Training, Lower Bourne Forest	Individual, Leith Hill	Relay, Eartham Wood	Warm down, Mytchett Common
1978	YHOA	Training, Rivelin	Individual, Wharncliffe and Grenoside	Relay, Strines	Warm down, Hope Woodlands
1979	SWOA	Training, Fernworthy Forest, Dartmoor	Individual, Fernworthy Forest, Dartmoor	Relay, Bramble Brook	Warm down, Quantock Forest South
1980	SOA	Training, Mark Hill	Day 1, Dalbeattie Forest	Day 2, Laurieston	Relay, Mabie Forest
1981	WMOA	Training, Lizard Hill and the Gallops, Lickey Hills (2 available)	Day 1, Beaudesert Park, Cannock Chase	Relay, Bishop's Wood	Day 2, Beaudesert Park, Cannock Chase
1982	SCOA	-	Day 1, Star Posts	Day 2, Star Posts	Relay, Yateley Heath
1983	NWOA	-	Day 1, Rusland & Finsthwaite Heights	Day 2, Finsthwaite & Stott Park Heights	Relay, Ulpha Park
1984	WOA	Training, Hafod Gwenllian	Day 1, Moel y Dyniewyd	Day 2, Braich Bryn	Relay, Clogwyn Mawr
1985	NEOA	Training, Beanley	Day 1, Kyloe	Day 2, Kyloe	Relay, Callaly
1986	EAOA	Training, Rishbeth and Warren Wood	Day 1, Brandon Park, Thetford	Day 2, Pretty Corner (Beeston Regis / Felbrigg)	Relay, Brandon Park, Thetford
1987	YHOA	Training, Raincliffe Woods	Day 1, Newtondale	Day 2, Barns Cliff	Relay, Cawthorne Banks
1988	SEOA	Training, Selhurst Park	Day 1, Charlton Forest	Day 2, Charlton Forest	Relay, Longmoor
1989	SWOA	Training, Gare Hill	Day 1, Longleat	Day 2, Stourhead	Relay, Stock Hill
1990	SOA	-	Day 1, Creag Vinean	Day 2, Craig a' Barns	Relay, Devilla Forest
1991	EMOA	Training, Cromford Moor and Black Rock	Day 1, Clumber Park	Day 2, Shining Cliff	Relay, Clumber Park
1992	NWOA	-	Day 1, Bigland Tarn	Day 2, Bigland & Backbarrow	Relay, Bigland Tarn
1993	SCOA	Training, Burghfield Common	Day 1, Woolmer & Longmoor	Day 2, Long Valley	Relay, Highclere
1994	WMOA	Training, Garway	Day 1, Garnstone & Foxley	Day 2, Pyon and Dinmore	Relay, Big Wood
1995	YHOA	Training, Guisecliffe Wood	Day 1, Wass Forest	Day 2, Kilnsey Moor	Relay, Gilling Woods
1996	NEOA	-	Day 1, Coate Moor	Day 2, Mulgrave Woods	Relay, Snotterdale
1997	SWOA	Training, The Towans South, and Killerton Park	Day 1, Penhale Sands	Day 2, Penhale Sands	Relay, Lanhydrock
1998	WOA	Training, Planta Fawr & Foel Offrwm	Day 1, Dolgledr	Day 2, Tir Stent	Relay, Garthwyllt
1999	SEOA	Training, Redlands, Dorking	Day 1, Leith Hill	Day 2, Winterfold Forest	Relay, Hawley & Homley
2000	SOA	-	Day 1, Drumbuie and Craig a'Barns	Day 2, Loch Rannoch	Relay, Tullochroisk
2001		Races cancelled due to outbreak of foot and mouth disease			
2002	SWOA	Training, Sallowvallets	Day 1, Lydney Park, Lydney	Day 2, Moseley Green, Blakeney	Relay, Lydney Park, Lydney
2003	SCOA	-	Day 1, Hambleden	Day 2, Star Posts	Relay, Hambleden
2004	NWOA/EMOA	Training, Simpson Ground	Day 1, Graythwaite, Ulverston	Day 2, Graythwaite, Ulverston	Relay, Graythwaite, Ulverston
2005	WMOA	Training, Tackeroo	Day 1, Brown Clee Hill	Day 2, Abraham's Valley	Relay, Hopwas
2006	YHOA	Sprint, Temple Newsam	Day 1, Ilkley Moor	Day 2, Keldy (formerly known as Cropton & Cawthorne)	Relay, Bramham Park
2007	BOF	Sprint, University of West of England, Bristol	Day 1, Speech House West, Forest of Dean	Day 2, Speech House East, Forest of Dean	Relay, MoD Caerwent, Chepstow
2008	SEOA	Sprint, University of Surrey, Guildford	Day 1, Leith Hill	Day 2, Ashdown Forest	Relay, Eridge Park
2009	NEOA	Sprint, Newcastle City	Day 1, Kyloe Woods	Day 2, Detchant, Shiellow, Greensheen Hill & Cockenhaugh	Relay, Dipton Woods
2010	SWOA	Sprint, Bicton / Exeter University	Day 1, Cookworthy Forest	Day 2, Braunton Burrows	Relay, Braunton Burrows
2011	NIOA	Sprint, Stranmillis University College and Queens Elm Village	Day 1, Tyrella	Day 2, Slieve Croob	Relay, Tyrella
2012	SOA	Sprint, Livingston	Day 1, Dunalastair	Day 2, Craig a Barns, Dunkeld	Relay, Newtyle
2013	SCOA	Sprint, University of Reading (Whiteknights Campus)	Day 1, Hambleden	Day 2, Cold Ash	Relay, Hambleden
2014	WOA	Sprint, Swansea University	Day 1, Merthyr Common	Day 2, Llangynidr	Relay, Pwll Du
2015	NWOA	Sprint, Lancaster University	Day 1, Ulpha Park and Barrow Fell	Day 2, Bigland	Relay, Colonel's Drive, Graythwaite
2016	YHOA	Sprint, Leeds University	Day 1, Wass Forest	Day 2, Kilnsey Moor	Relay, Storthes Hall
2017	SEOA	Sprint, Brunel University	Day 1, Ambersham Common	Day 2, Holmbush and St Leonard's	Relay, Pippingford Park
2018	WMOA	Sprint, MoD Stafford	Day 1, Brereton Spurs	Day 2, Beaudesert	Relay, Beaudesert
2019	SCOA	Sprint, Aldershot Garrison	Day 1, Windmill Hill, Deepcut	Day 2, Cold Ash	Relay, Minley
2020		Races cancelled due to outbreak of COVID-19			
2021		Races cancelled due to outbreak of COVID-19			
2022	WOA	Sprint, Swansea University	Day 1, Clydach Terrace	Day 2, Pwll Du	Relay, Caerwent
2023	NWOA	Sprint, Lancaster University	Day 1, High Dam	Day 2, Bigland Estate	Relay, Dale Park
2024	WMOA	Sprint, Loughborough University	Day 1, Beaudesert	Day 2, Beaudesert	Relay, Stanton Moor
2025	YHOA	Sprint, Sheffield city centre	Middle, Tankersley	Long, Wharncliffe	Relay, Middleton Park
2026	SOA	Sprint, Perth City Centre	Middle, Rannoch Forest	Long, Rannoch Forest	Relay, Tullochroisk

== Race footnotes ==
- JK69. The race was held in NEOA but organised by NWOA.
- JK69. The Relay was to have been held at Slaley but had to be cancelled due to snow. The race was moved to Kielder Forest, Lewisburn Area.
- JK74. This race was the first British race to attract more than one thousand competitors.
- JK81. For this year only, the Relay was held on the Sunday i.e. between the two individual days.
- JK89. At this race there were two deaths. On the Saturday Swedish visitor Stig Gorman (58) of Mariestad died within sight of the finishing line; and on the Sunday Martin Cochrane (81) of Sarum Orienteers died shortly after starting the Orange colour-coded course.
- JK98. On the Sunday the courses using the Red start were cancelled due to snow. This decision led to a controversy which was discussed in Compass Sport & The Orienteer and also at British Orienteering Federation (BOF) National Office.
- JK2001. The whole weekend of races was cancelled due to an outbreak of foot and mouth disease.
- JK2006. A sprint race was introduced at this competition on the Friday, in addition to the usual Training opportunity. This was an attempt to make the sport more 'spectator friendly' and was part of the International Orienteering Federation's proposal to make the sport an Olympic sport.
- JK2020 & 2021. The whole weekend of races was cancelled due to an outbreak of COVID-19. Races were to be held by NEOA for 2020 & SWOA for 2021 before cancellation. See COVID-19 pandemic in the United Kingdom for more details.
- JK2024. The women's elite race was declared void on Day 1 at Beaudesert. The overall result was based solely on the Day 2 race.

== Elite Class Champions ==
	Men's competition			Women's competition		
Year	Sprint Champion	Overall Champion	Relay Champions	Sprint Champion	Overall Champion	Relay Champions
1967	-	Gordon Pirie	-	-	Jenny Tennant	-
1968	-	Jonathan Thomson	-	-	M Pinel	-
1969	-	Frantisek Dvorak	Edinburgh University	-	Jitrenka Sevcikova	-
1970	-	Geoff Peck	Gular (NOR)	-	Carol McNeill	-
1971	-	Per Andreasson	Pan Kristianstad (SWE)	-	Sue Banner	-
1972	-	Rolf Pettersson	Goteborg (SWE)	-	Bibbe Siljeblad	-
1973	-	Rolf Pettersson	Hagaby (SWE)	-	Inger Gunnarsson	-
1974	-	Rolf Pettersson	Piz Hasi (SUI)	-	Sarolta Monspart	Fjaras (SWE)
1975	-	Rolf Pettersson	Ikaalisten (FIN)	-	Liisa Veijalainen	Argus (SUI)
1976	-	Jan Fjærestad	Ikaalisten (FIN)	-	Wenke Jacobsen	Fjaras (SWE)
1977	-	Geoff Peck	University of London	-	Ingrid Ohlsson	Cambridge University
1978	-	Chris Hirst	BOK (Bristol)	-	Carol McNeill	INT (Edinburgh)
1979	-	Chris Hirst	BOK (Bristol)	-	Sue Parkin	WRE (Wrekin)
1980	-	Dag Lunder	BOK (Bristol)	-	Sue Parkin	INT (Edinburgh)
1981	-	Geoff Peck	BOK (Bristol)	-	Sue Parkin	INT (Edinburgh)
1982	-	Alain Gafner	SN (Aldershot)	-	Susanne Lüscher	WCH (Cannock Chase)
1983	-	Martin Bagness	OK Orion (SWE)	-	Yvette Hague	CLYDE (Glasgow)
1984	-	Martin Bagness	SYO (South Yorkshire)	-	Christine Whalley	MDOC (Manchester)
1985	-	Chris Hirst	WCH (Cannock Chase)	-	Marsela Robertson	ROC (Reading)
1986	-	Martin Bagness	Hagaby (SWE)	-	Hilde Tellesbø	NTHI (NOR)
1987	-	Richard Bloor	AIRE (West Yorkshire)	-	Hazel McNee	CLOK (Cleveland)
1988	-	Stephen Palmer	SELOC (South East Lancashire)	-	Karen Parker	SOC (Southampton)
1989	-	Hakan Eriksson	OK Tyr (SWE)	-	Karen Parker	CLOK (Cleveland)
1990	-	Steven Hale	OK Tyr (SWE)	-	Yvette Hague	Kalev (EST)
1991	-	Steven Hale	OK Tyr (SWE)	-	Yvette Hague	SYO (South Yorkshire)
1992	-	Steven Hale	CLYDE (Glasgow)	-	Yvette Hague	Edinburgh University
1993	-	Steven Hale	CLYDE (Glasgow)	-	Heather Monro	Trondheim (NOR)
1994	-	Christian Hanselman	SYO (South Yorkshire)	-	Alice Bedwell	SYO (South Yorkshire)
1995	-	Alain Berger	SYO (South Yorkshire)	-	Yvette Hague	SYO (South Yorkshire)
1996	-	Alain Berger	SYO (South Yorkshire)	-	Yvette Hague	Edinburgh University
1997	-	Mikko Knutti	WAROC Lake District	-	Yvette Hague	SYO (South Yorkshire)
1998	-	Mikko Knutti	OK Tyr (SWE)	-	Yvette Hague	SYO (South Yorkshire)
1999	-	Jamie Stevenson	SYO (South Yorkshire)	-	Heather Monro	WAROC (Lake District)
2000	-	Andrew Kitchin	Newcastle University	-	Sarah Pattinson	FVO (Stirling)
2001	-	-	-	-	-	-
2002	-	Jamie Stevenson	SYO (South Yorkshire)	-	Hannah Wootton	Halden SK (NOR)
2003	-	Jon Duncan	WAROC (Lake District)	-	Heather Monro	EBOR (York)
2004	-	Jamie Stevenson	SYO (South Yorkshire)	-	Hannah Wootton	SYO (South Yorkshire)
2005	-	Jamie Stevenson	Edinburgh University	-	Heather Monro	SYO (South Yorkshire)
2006	Graham Gristwood	Graham Gristwood	Sheffield University	Heather Monro	Heather Monro	SYO (South Yorkshire)
2007	Øystein Kvaal Østerbø	Oli Johnson	Edinburgh University	Pippa Whitehouse	Jenny Johnson	SYO (South Yorkshire)
2008	Daniel Hubmann	Daniel Hubmann	Kristiansand OK (NOR)	Sarah Rollins	Elise Egseth	Wing O (SWE)
2009	Ross Morrison	Oli Johnson	Edinburgh University	Pippa Whitehouse	Rachael Elder	SYO (South Yorkshire)
2010	Graham Gristwood	Matthew Speake	Sheffield University	Sarah Rollins	Sarah Rollins	SYO (South Yorkshire)
2011	Matthew Crane	Hector Haines	INT (Edinburgh)	Sarah Rollins & Pippa Archer	Tessa Hill	British Army
2012	Murray Strain	Scott Fraser	INT (Edinburgh)	Sarah Rollins	Claire Ward	Edinburgh University
2013	Murray Strain	Matthew Speake	INT (Edinburgh)	Tessa Hill	Catherine Taylor	SYO (South Yorkshire)
2014	Peter Hodkinson	Hector Haines	INT (Edinburgh)	Tessa Hill	Claire Ward	SYO (South Yorkshire)
2015	Matthias Kyburz & Scott Fraser	Thierry Gueorgiou	INT (Edinburgh)	Emma Klingenberg	Catherine Taylor	FVO (Stirling)
2016	Kristian Jones	Anton Johansson	FVO (Stirling)	Charlotte Ward	Jo Shepherd	FVO (Stirling)
2017	Kristian Jones	Graham Gristwood	FVO (Stirling)	Tessa Strain	Tessa Strain	SYO (South Yorkshire)
2018	Kristian Jones	Alasdair McLeod	Edinburgh University	Megan Carter Davies	Jessica Tullie	LOC (Lake District)
2019	William Gardner	Chris Smithard	FVO (Stirling)	Megan Carter Davies	Megan Carter Davies	Edinburgh University
2020	-	-	-	-	-	-
2021	-	-	-	-	-	-
2022	Alexander Chepelin	Alexander Chepelin	Octavian Droobers	Alice Leake	Megan Carter-Davies	SBOC (Swansea Bay)
2023	William Gardner	Alexander Chepelin	INT (Edinburgh)	Megan Carter-Davies	Megan Carter-Davies	Nydalens SK (Norway)
2024	Peter Hodkinson	Luke Fisher	FVO (Stirling)	Laura Robertson	Cecilie Andersen	SYO (Sheffield)
2025	Nathan Lawson	Euan Tryner	FVO (Stirling)	Chloe Potter	Megan Mitchell	Edinburgh University
2026	Peter Molloy	Euan Tryner	Edinburgh University	Grace Molloy	Niamh Hunter	Edinburgh University
