= British Orienteering Championships =

Orienteering competition

The British Orienteering Championships are the highest level of competition in Orienteering in the United Kingdom, along with the JK Orienteering Festival.

1967 saw the first British Championships, held in Hamsterley Forest, in what was then called the "Classic" discipline, and is now more commonly known as the "Long" distance. Since then, 5 further disciplines have emerged over which a British Championships is contested:

- The British Relay Championships were first held in 1972
- The British Night Championships were first held in 1978
- The British Middle Championships were first held in 1998
- The British Sprint Championships were first held in 2002
- The British Mixed Sprint Relay first had a trial in 2016 followed by the first official championship in 2017

== Race venues ==
Year	Long (Classic)	Relay	Night	Middle	Sprint	Mixed Sprint Relay
1967	Hamsterley Forest	-	-	-	-	-
1968	Cannock Chase	-	-	-	-	-
1969	Kirroughtree	-	-	-	-	-
1970	Fernworthy, Dartmoor	-	-	-	-	-
1971	Redesdale	-	-	-	-	-
1972	Mark Ash Wood	Newcastleton	-	-	-	-
1973	Tarn Hows	Clipstone	-	-	-	-
1974	Blackdown	Puddletown	-	-	-	-
1975	Strines	Hope	-	-	-	-
1976	Cropton	Hafodgwenllian	-	-	-	-
1977	Cannock Chase	Christmas Common	-	-	-	-
1978	Tentsmuir Forest	Mulgrave Woods	Ash Ranges	-	-	-
1979	Bethecar Moor	Swynnerton	Frith Hill	-	-	-
1980	Bramshaw	Pickering	Sutton Park	-	-	-
1981	Dipton Wood	Holmbury Hill	Delamere Forest	-	-	-
1982	Shining Cliff	Pembrey forest	Longmoor	-	-	-
1983	Pippingford Park	Dalswinton	Bradgate Park	-	-	-
1984	Wharncliffe	Wendover Woods	Burnham Beeches	-	-	-
1985	Wyre Forest	Clipstone	Bulford Ranges	-	-	-
1986	Achilty	Crabtree Hill	Broomley Fell	-	-	-
1987	Lightning Tree Hill	Dipton Woods	Clipstone Forest	-	-	-
1988	Holme Fell	Torver Common	Sandringham Park	-	-	-
1989	Star Posts	Mytchett Common	Grindleton	-	-	-
1990	Ewden valley	Deffer Woods	Swallowvallets, Forest of Dean	-	-	-
1991	Kyloe	Callaly	Clent & Hagley	-	-	-
1992	Kelling	Brandon Park	Ogden	-	-	-
1993	Brown Clee Hill	Brown Clee Hill	Chelwood	-	-	-
1994	Charlton Forest	Heyshott	Delamere Forest	-	-	-
1995	Newborough Forest	Rhos & Bryngefiliau	Blackwood	-	-	-
1996	Creag Mhic Chailein	Coille Nathais	Pembrey forest	-	-	-
1997	Clumber Park	Chatsworth	Weybourne Woods	-	-	-
1998	Black Fell	Mytchett Common	Newcastleton	Tarn Hows	-	-
1999	Greythwaite	Holker	Penhale Sands	Blakeholme	-	-
2000	Loch Vaa, Aviemore	Penyard Hill	Bentley Woods	Loch Vaa, Aviemore	-	-
2001	Newborough Forest	-	Blacka Moor	-	-	-
2002	Magilligan Strand	Baronscourt Estate	Heyshott and Ambersham Commons	Binevenagh	Williamson Park	-
2003	High Dam	Greno Woods	Duke's House Wood	Haverthwaite	Ham Hill	-
2004	Lossiemouth Forest	Lydney Park	Crich Chase	Culbin Forest	Haverthwaite	-
2005	Penhale Sands	Penhale Sands	Watergrove	The Devil's Pound	Sandhurst	-
2006	Furnace Wood	Furnace Wood	Hawley & Hornley	Fonthill	Campbell Park	-
2007	Pwll Du	Pwll Du	Sheringham Park	Mulgrave Woods	Scarborough	-
2008	Culbin East	Culbin West	New Beechenhurst, Forest of Dean	Hopwas Woods	Warwick University	-
2009	New Beechenhurst & Mallard's Pike	Beaulieu Estate	Mytchett Common	Cademan & Thringstone Woods	University of Nottingham	-
2010	Cannock Chase	Cannock Chase	Pentland Hills	Haverthwaite	Chorley	-
2011	Wharncliffe	Tankersley Woods	Bentley Woods	Worth Forest	Brighton	-
2012	Dale Garth, Lake District	Helsington Barrows	Hamptworth Estate	Strensall Common	York University	-
2013	Winterfold and Pitch Hill	Holmbury Hill	Tankersley Woods	Stanton Moor	Loughborough University	-
2014	Thrunton Woods and Callaly	Cragg Estate & Chesterhope Common	Pippingford Park	Brereton Spurs	Keele University	-
2015	New Beechenhurst, Forest of Dean	Cannop Ponds	Middleton Park	Bradenham and Naphill	Aldershot Garrison	-
2016	Brown Clee Hill	Brown Clee Hill	Cademan & Thringstone Woods	Leith Hill	Queen Elizabeth Olympic Park	The Edge Campus, Sheffield
2017	High Dam	Summerhouse Knott	Great Tower Wood	Wendover Woods	Campbell Park	Edge Hill University
2018	Balmoral Estate	Torphantrick	Merthyr Mawr	Stock Hill	University of Bath	Pegswood, Morpeth
2019	Arncliffe and Kilnsey North	Middleton Park	Muir of Dinnet	Chinley Churn	Loughborough University	Bradford University
2020	[Note 3]	[Note 3]	Hambleden	[Note 3]	[Note 3]	[Note 3]
2021	Braunton Burrows	Fairy Knowe and Doon Hill	Cleeve Hill	Summerhouse Knott	Skelmersdale	Skelmersdale
2022	Golden Valley and Cognor Wood	Iron Hill and Parkgate Rough	Ilkley Moor	Rushmere	University of Leeds	
2023	Cold Ash	Hambledon	Moors Valley Country Park	Drumkeeragh Wood, Northern Ireland	Armagh, Northern Ireland	Brunel University
2024	Mulgrave Woods	Hutton Mulgrave and Skelder	Hawse End, Keswick	Danefield	University of Warwick	Birmingham University
2025	Grizedale Forest	Bigland	Touch Muir	Holmbush and Buchan Country Park	University of East Anglia	RAF Honnington

== Men's champions ==
Note 1: Courses cancelled due to an outbreak of foot and mouth disease.

Note 2: Courses voided due to unfair advantage.

Note 3: Courses cancelled due to COVID-19.

Year	Long (Classic)	Relay	Night	Middle	Sprint
1967	Gordon Pirie	-	-	-	-
1968	Gordon Pirie	-	-	-	-
1969	Mike Wells-Cole	-	-	-	-
1970	Mike Wells-Cole	-	-	-	-
1971	Geoff Peck	-	-	-	-
1972	Mike Murray	INT (Edinburgh)	-	-	-
1973	Geoff Peck	OK Nuts (South East)	-	-	-
1974	Alistair Wood	OK Nuts (South East)	-	-	-
1975	Tony Thornley	Oxford University	-	-	-
1976	Geoff Peck	WCOC (West Cumberland)	-	-	-
1977	Geoff Peck	University of London	-	-	-
1978	Brian Bullen	AIRE (West Yorkshire)	Mark Elgood	-	-
1979	Geoff Peck	Oxford University	Adrian Barnes	-	-
1980	Chris Hirst	Cambridge University	Dave Kingham	-	-
1981	Chris Hirst	British Army	Mark Elgood	-	-
1982	Chris Hirst	SN (Surrey)	Ian Rochford	-	-
1983	Chris Hirst	FVO (Stirling)	Chris Hirst	-	-
1984	Martin Bagness	SYO (South Yorkshire)	Mark Elgood	-	-
1985	Martin Bagness	Sheffield University	John Rye	-	-
1986	Andy Kitchin	British Army	Steven Hale	-	-
1987	Andy Kitchin	SYO (South Yorkshire)	Steven Hale	-	-
1988	Steven Hale	WCH (Cannock Chase)	Bill Edwards	-	-
1989	Steven Hale	WAROC (Lake District)	Tim Watkins	-	-
1990	Steven Hale	SYO (South Yorkshire)	Alun Powell	-	-
1991	Stephen Palmer	INT (Edinburgh)	Clive Hallett	-	-
1992	Steve Nicholson	CLYDE (Glasgow)	Dave Peel	-	-
1993	Dave Peel	SN (Surrey)	Ulrik Staugaard	-	-
1994	Neil Conway	SYO (South Yorkshire)	Steve Nicholson	-	-
1995	Jonathan Musgrave	SYO (South Yorkshire)	Simon Bourne	-	-
1996	Steve Nicholson	Sheffield University	Dave Peel	-	-
1997	Jamie Stevenson	Sheffield University	Bill Edwards	-	-
1998	Steve Nicholson	SYO (South Yorkshire)	Dave Farquhar	Jamie Stevenson	-
1999	Stephen Palmer	SYO (South Yorkshire)	Charlie Adams	Dickie Wren	-
2000	Jon Duncan	SYO (South Yorkshire)	Dave Peel	Ed Nash	-
2001	Jon Duncan	[Note 1]	Oli Johnson	[Note 1]	-
2002	Daniel Marston	INT (Edinburgh)	Oli Johnson	Jon Duncan	Jon Duncan
2003	Ed Nash	Octavian Droobers	Steve Birkenshaw	Oli Johnson	Jamie Stevenson
2004	Ed Nash	FVO (Stirling)	Ed Nash	Ewan McCarthy	Jamie Stevenson
2005	Oli Johnson	Sheffield University	Andrew Etherden	Oli Johnson	Nick Barrable
2006	Jamie Stevenson	WAROC (Lake District)	Nick Barrable	Neil Northrop	Graham Gristwood
2007	Oli Johnson	Sheffield University	Nick Barrable	Oli Johnson	Scott Fraser
2008	Oli Johnson	INT (Edinburgh)	Nick Barrable	Matthew Crane	Scott Fraser
2009	Oli Johnson	SYO (South Yorkshire)	Tuomas Tala	Scott Fraser	Scott Fraser
2010	Matthew Crane	Sheffield University	Alasdair McLeod	Oli Johnson	Graham Gristwood
2011	Doug Tullie	Sheffield University	Matthew Crane	Graham Gristwood	Murray Strain
2012	Hector Haines	INT (Edinburgh)	Mark Bown	Oli Johnson	Chris Smithard
2013	Murray Strain	Oxford University	Jonathan Crickmore & Richard Robinson	Murray Strain	Kristian Jones
2014	Graham Gristwood	INT (Edinburgh)	Graham Gristwood	Kristian Jones	Murray Strain
2015	Graham Gristwood	INT (Edinburgh)	Graham Gristwood	James Tullie	Murray Strain
2016	Graham Gristwood	Edinburgh University	Graham Gristwood	Kristian Jones	Kristian Jones
2017	Graham Gristwood	Edinburgh University	Graham Gristwood	Jamie Parkinson	Jamie Parkinson
2018	Peter Hodkinson	FVO (Stirling)	Graham Gristwood	Jonathan Crickmore	Jonathan Crickmore
2019	Alasdair McLeod	AIRE (West Yorkshire)	Graham Gristwood	Graham Gristwood	Kristian Jones
2020	[Note 3]	[Note 3]	Graham Gristwood	[Note 3]	[Note 3]
2021	Alasdair Pedley	FVO (Stirling)	Philip Vokes	Graham Gristwood	Jonathan Crickmore
2022	Graham Gristwood	FVO (Stirling)	Graham Gristwood	William Gardner	Kristian Jones
2023	Peter Taylor-Bray	OD	Richard Robinson	Nathan Lawson	Nathan Lawson
2024	Will Gardner	FVO (Stirling)	James Hammond	Ben Mitchell	Nathan Lawson
2025	Ben Mitchell	FVO (Stirling)	Luke Fisher	Jonathan Crickmore	

== Women's champions ==
Year	Long (Classic)	Relay	Night	Middle	Sprint
1967	Carol McNeill	-	-	-	-
1968	Hazel Hill	-	-	-	-
1969	Carol McNeill	-	-	-	-
1970	Sue Banner	-	-	-	-
1971	Sue Bone	-	-	-	-
1972	Carol McNeill	Newcastle University	-	-	-
1973	Allyson Reed	DVO (Derwent Valley)	-	-	-
1974	Carol McNeill	ROC (Reading)	-	-	-
1975	Carol McNeill	DVO (Derwent Valley)	-	-	-
1976	Carol McNeill	MDOC (Manchester)	-	-	-
1977	Sue Banner	MDOC (Manchester)	-	-	-
1978	Jenny Pearson	EBOR (York)	Allyson Reed	-	-
1979	Jean Ramsden	DVO (Derwent Valley)	Allyson Reed	-	-
1980	Sue Parkin	DVO (Derwent Valley)	Kathy Crease	-	-
1981	[Note 2]	SYO (South Yorkshire)	C. Beveridge	-	-
1982	Jane Robson	LOK (London)	Frances Watkins	-	-
1983	Jenny Pearson	SLOW (South London)	Frances Watkins	-	-
1984	Sue Parkin	ROC (Reading)	Karen Parker	-	-
1985	Jean Ramsden	SYO (South Yorkshire)	Frances Watkins	-	-
1986	Ann Salisbury	SN (Surrey)	Karen Parker	-	-
1987	Jean Ramsden	CLOK (Cleveland)	Karen Parker	-	-
1988	Karen Parker	CLOK (Cleveland)	Chris Midgley	-	-
1989	Yvette Hague	SYO (South Yorkshire)	Frances Watkins	-	-
1990	Yvette Hague	SLOW (South London)	Jackie Davis	-	-
1991	Yvette Hague	Edinburgh University	Diane Leakey	-	-
1992	[Note 2]	Edinburgh University	Yvette Hague	-	-
1993	Heather Monro	SYO (South Yorkshire)	Heather Monro	-	-
1994	Yvette Hague	SYO (South Yorkshire)	Heather Monro	-	-
1995	Yvette Hague	INT (Edinburgh)	Alice Bedwell	-	-
1996	Una Creagh	JOK (Oxford University alumni)	Alice Bedwell	-	-
1997	[Note 2]	ERYRI (North Wales)	Jenny James	-	-
1998	Yvette Hague	SYO (South Yorkshire)	Encarna Maturana	Yvette Hague	-
1999	Yvette Baker	SYO (South Yorkshire)	Michelle Spillar	Yvette Hague	-
2000	Heather Monro	SYO (South Yorkshire)	Jenny James	Heather Monro	-
2001	Jenny James	[Note 1]	Helen Hargreaves	[Note 1]	-
2002	Heather Monro	SYO (South Yorkshire)	Sarah Rollins	Heather Monro	Sarah Rollins
2003	Jenny Whitehead	INT (Edinburgh)	Sarah Rollins	Sarah Rollins	Sarah Rollins
2004	Helen Winskill	SYO (South Yorkshire)	Helen Winskill	Helen Winskill	Kim Buckley
2005	Helen Winskill	SYO (South Yorkshire)	Aislinn Austin	Heather Monro	Heather Monro
2006	Heather Monro	CLOK (Cleveland)	Sarah Rollins	Abi Weeds	Sarah Rollins
2007	Jenny Johnson	SYO (South Yorkshire)	Clare Leventon	Helen Winskill	Pippa Whitehouse
2008	Rachael Elder	Sheffield University	Ekaterina Orekhova	Sarah Rollins	Pippa Whitehouse
2009	Pippa Whitehouse	CLOK (Cleveland)	Sarah Rollins	Sarah Rollins	Sarah Rollins
2010	Sarah Rollins	Edinburgh University	Pippa Archer	Rachael Elder	Sarah Rollins
2011	Tessa Hill	WCOC (West Cumberland)	Tessa Hill	Claire Ward	Hollie Orr
2012	Sarah Rollins	WCOC (West Cumberland)	Helen Bridle	Claire Ward	Catherine Taylor
2013	Tessa Hill	SYO (South Yorkshire)	Rachael Elder	Rachael Rothman	Tessa Hill
2014	Claire Ward	Edinburgh University	Jenny Peel	Tessa Hill	Tessa Hill
2015	Jessica Tullie	SN (Surrey)	Claire Ward	Jessica Tullie	Charlotte Ward
2016	Kim Baxter	SROC (Lancashire)	Claire Ward	Lucy Butt	Charlotte Ward
2017	Tessa Strain	Edinburgh University	Heather Roome	Megan Carter Davies	Alice Leake
2018	Jo Shepherd	FVO (Stirling)	Megan Carter Davies	Cecilie Andersen	Alice Leake
2019	Megan Carter Davies	SYO (South Yorkshire)	Fay Walsh	Megan Carter Davies	Megan Carter Davies
2020	[Note 3]	[Note 3]	Megan Carter Davies	[Note 3]	[Note 3]
2021	Chloe Potter	Edinburgh University	Megan Carter Davies	Hollie Orr	Alice Leake
2022	Megan Carter Davies	SYO (South Yorkshire)	Megan Carter Davies	Alice Leake	Megan Carter Davies
2023	Julie Emmerson	Edinburgh University	Kezia Jukes	Fiona Bunn	Fiona Bunn
2024	Fiona Bunn	Edinburgh University	Fiona Bunn	Megan Carter Davies	Megan Carter Davies
2025	Megan Mitchell	SYO (South Yorkshire)	Fiona Bunn	Megan Mitchell	
2026					

== British Mixed Sprint champions ==
Year	Mixed Sprint Relay
2016	FVO (Stirling)
2017	FVO (Stirling)
2018	FVO (Stirling)
2019	Edinburgh University
2020	[Note 3]
2021	SYO (South Yorkshire)
2022	FVO (Stirling)
2023	SYO (South Yorkshire)
2024	Edinburgh University
2025	
