= List of orienteering clubs =

This is a list of all orienteering clubs found in Wikipedia.

== B ==
- IL i BUL, Norway, Oslo, won the first Norwegian relay championship in Orienteering in 1946
- Bækkelagets SK, Norway, Oslo, won the Jukola relay in 1988, 1999 and 2002

== C ==
- Cambridge Sports Union, Cambridge, Massachusetts
- Club Orientació Catalunya, Barcelona, Catalunya

== D ==
- Delaware Valley Orienteering Association, Pennsylvania, United States

== E ==
- English Orienteering Council

== F ==
- Florø TIF, Norway, Florø
- Fossum IF, Norway, Bærum

== G ==
- Garingal Orienteers, Australia, Sydney
- Goldseekers Orienteering, Orange, NSW, Australia
- Gruppo sportivo Pavione (Pavione sportive group), Italy, Imer
- IFK Göteborg, Gothenburg, Sweden

== H ==
- Halden SK, Norway, Halden

== I ==
- IKHP Huskvarna, Sweden, Huskvarna

== K ==
- Kalevan Rasti, Finland, Joensuu
- Kristiansand OK, Norway, Kristiansand

== L ==
- Lev Hasharon - Menashe OC, Israel

== M ==
- Mälarhöjdens IK, Sweden

== N ==
- Navi, Finland, Mikkeli
- Nesodden IF, Norway, Nesodden
- New England Orienteering Club
- NSW Orienteering Association, NSW, Australia
- Nordstrand IF, Norway
- Northeast Ohio Orienteering Club, Ohio, United States
- NTNUI, Norway, Trondheim, is the largest sports club in Norway with more than 10,000 members

== O ==
- Ottawa Orienteering Club, Canada, Ottawa

== P ==
- Potteries Orienteering Club, West Midlands, Great Britain

== S ==
- South London Orienteers and Wayfarers, United Kingdom, London
- Spårvägens GoIF, Sweden, Stockholm
- IF Sturla, Norway, Drammen
- South Florida Orienteering, Florida, USA

== T ==
- OK Tyr, Sweden, Karlstad, won Tiomila 1989 and 1990
- IL Tyrving, Norway, Sandvika
- Thames Valley Orienteering Club, Buckinghamshire and Oxfordshire, UK (UK Orienteering Club of the Year 2015)

== V ==
- TIF Viking, Norway, Bergenhus

== See also ==
- Scottish Orienteering Association, a constituent association of the British Orienteering Federation
