= Ralph Street =

British orienteering competitor

Personal information
- Nationality: British
- Born: 1990 (age 35–36) London, United Kingdom

Sport
- Sport: Orienteering
Medal record
Men's orienteering
Representing United Kingdom
World Championships
| Silver medal – second place | 2022 Triangle Region | Sprint Relay |
World Games
| Bronze medal – third place | 2022 Birmingham | Sprint Relay |

Ralph Street (born 1990) is a British orienteering competitor. He was part of the British team that came second in the sprint relay at the 2022 World Orienteering Championships. His team included Megan Carter Davies, Kris Jones and Charlotte Ward.

Street has competed for Baekkelagets SK in Norway, Sodertalje Nykvarn Orientering and Nydalens in Sweden and South London Orienteers. He has also competed for Sheffield University Orienteering Club.

Street's favourite orienteering competition is the Jukola Relay in Finland.

Street started orienteering at the age of nine. His first orienteering event was Highland '99, running alongside the 1999 World Orienteering Championships where Yvette Baker won Britain's first gold medal. When growing up, his major inspirations were British orienteers such as Yvette Baker, Heather Monro, Jamie Stevenson and Jon Duncan. He first competed for Great Britain at the European Youth Orienteering Championships in 2007.

After graduating with a degree in Geography and Town Planning from the University of Sheffield in 2012, Street moved to Sweden before moving to Norway. As of 2022, Street lives in Oslo and works in IT Support.
