= Alice Leake =

British orienteering competitor

Personal information
- Nationality: British
- Born: 1991 (age 34–35) Pontefract, Yorkshire

Sport
- Sport: Orienteering
Medal record
Women's orienteering
Representing United Kingdom
World Orienteering Championships
Bronze medal – third place	2022 Triangle Region	Sprint

Alice Leake (born 1991) is a British orienteering competitor. She received a bronze medal in the Sprint discipline at the 2022 World Orienteering Championships, behind Megan Carter Davies and Simona Aebersold.

Leake's medal came after a series of improving performances at World Championships events, coming 8th in sprint at the 2018 World Orienteering Championships and 4th at the next sprint World Championships in 2021, before receiving a bronze medal at the championships in 2022. She first competed for British Orienteering at the 2015 World Orienteering Championships.

Leake competes for the Airienteers and Southern Navigators orienteering clubs. She has also been a member of Edinburgh University Orienteering Club, and has won both the British Orienteering Championships and the Jan Kjellström Orienteering Festival.

Leake retired from international orienteering in 2023.
