= Bedburn =

Village in County Durham, England

Coordinates: 54.679218°N 1.8448200°W

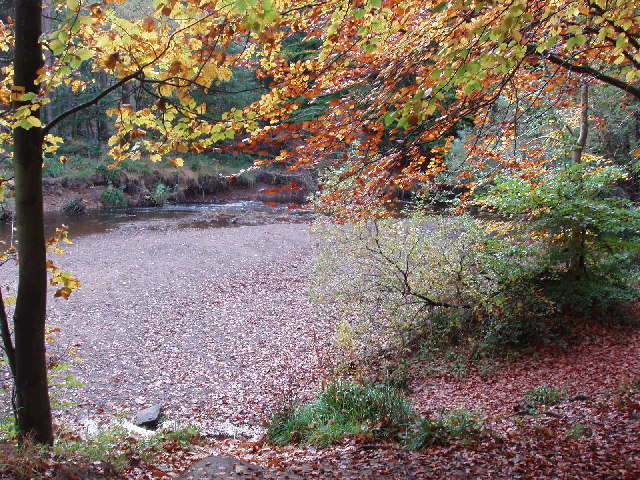
- Bedburn Beck in Autumn, Hamsterley Forest

- Location within County Durham
- Population: 171 (2011)
- OS grid reference: NZ101043
- Civil parish: South Bedburn
- Unitary authority: County Durham
- Ceremonial county: County Durham
- Region: North East
- Country: England
- Sovereign state: United Kingdom
- Post town: Bishop Auckland
- Postcode district: DL13
- Police: Durham
- Fire: County Durham and Darlington
- Ambulance: North East
- UK Parliament: Bishop Auckland

Bedburn is a village in County Durham, in England. It is in the civil parish of South Bedburn, near Hamsterley, and Hamsterley Forest. The Bedburn Beck a tributary of the River Wear, flows past the village. The population of this civil parish at the 2011 census was 171.
