= Bedburn Beck =

Upper tributary of the River Wear in County Durham, England

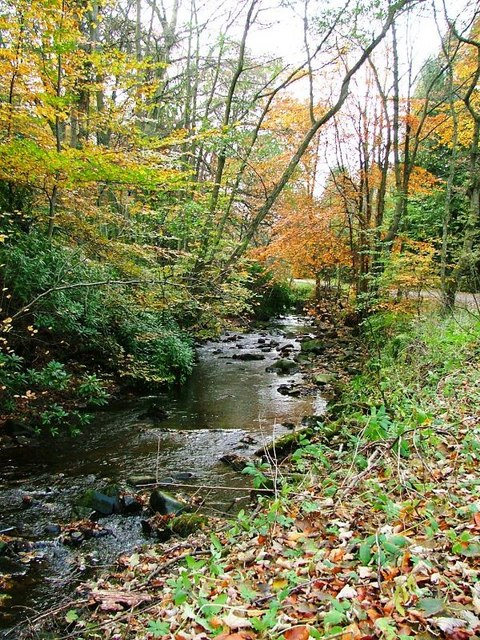
- Bedburn Beck in Hamsterley Forest

- Location of the mouth within County Durham

Location
- Country: England
- County: County Durham

Physical characteristics
- Source
  - location: Woodland Fell
- Mouth
  - location: River Wear
  - coordinates: 54.684743°N 1.800°W
- Length: 16.8 km (10.4 mi)
- Basin size: 76 km^{2} (29 sq mi)
- Discharge
  - location: Bedburn
  - average: 1.23 m^{3}/s (43 cu ft/s)

Bedburn Beck is a 16.8 kilometres (10.4 mi) long, upper tributary of the River Wear in County Durham, England. The beck and its tributaries, including the Euden, Harthorpe and South Grain becks, have a catchment of 76 square kilometres (29 sq mi), much of which is covered by the coniferous Hamsterley Forest.

== Course ==
Its headwaters rise on the high ground of Woodland Fell, where it is known as the Spurlswood Beck which flows in an easterly direction through a rocky gill of the same name. It then enters Hamsterley Forest, where it is joined by the Euden Beck and becomes known as the Bedburn Beck.

Passing beside the hamlet of Redford before being joined by the Ayhope or South Grain Beck, it then reaches the village of Bedburn where it is bridged by a minor road. Beyond the village it meets the Harthorpe Beck, before descending into the Wear valley between Hamsterley and Witton-le-Wear.

== Hydrology ==
The flow of the beck has been measured at a gauging station in its lower reaches at Bedburn since 1959. The catchment to the station of 75 square kilometres (29 sq mi) measures 99% of the total catchment of the beck, and yields an average flow of 1.23 cubic metres per second (43 cu ft/s).

The highest river level recorded at the station occurred on the 17 July 2009, with a height of 2.31 metres (7 ft 7 in) and a flow of 79 cubic metres per second (2,800 cu ft/s).

The catchment has an average annual rainfall of 894 millimetres (35.2 in) and a maximum altitude of 533 metres (1,749 ft) near Pawlaw Pike at the western edge of the basin.

Land use within the basin is rural, consisting of moorland, grassland and the coniferous Hamsterley Forest.

== See also ==
- List of rivers of England
