= Edinburgh University Orienteering Club =

UK student organization

- Founded: 1964
- Type: Orienteering club
- Region served: Edinburgh University

Edinburgh University Orienteering Club is the most successful University Orienteering Club in the United Kingdom, winning the JK or British relays 15 times in total. It's also recognised by the abbreviation EUOC. Students from Edinburgh University, Heriot Watt University and Edinburgh Napier University are all allowed to join the club. After graduation, old members are allowed to join AROS (Auld Reekie Orienteering Society), a club for past students.

== History ==
Edinburgh University has been an important club throughout the history of Orienteering in the UK. It was founded in 1964, which was 3 years before the formation of the British Orienteering Federation in 1967, making it one of the first orienteering clubs in the UK.

The university won the first men's relay at the JK Orienteering Festival in 1969; The event was held in Kielder Forest, Northumberland. The club then went through a period with little domestic success.

The next win at the domestic relays was the British Orienteering Championships in 1991, where the women's team won, retaining their title a year later. The women also won the JK relays that year and in 1996. During this time World Champion Yvette Baker was a student at the university, and in 2011 she was inducted into the Edinburgh University Sports hall of fame.

Recently, the club has experienced its most successful period, winning the JK Relays 5 times between 2000 and 2018, and winning the British Championships twice in a row in 2016 and 2017, their first victories in the event, ending a 48 year wait. Recently, the club has had a fierce rivalry with Sheffield University, which was also very successful, winning the British Championships 5 times and the JK twice.

Edinburgh University regularly sends a team to the Jukola relay in Finland.

== Notable members ==
Following are some of the organization's notable members.

- Yvette Baker
- Jon Duncan
- Scott Fraser
- Catherine Taylor
