= Ashop =

Ashop may refer to:

- River Ashop, in Derbyshire, England
- Upper Ashop, Hope Woodlands, Derbyshire, England
