= Martin Bagness =

British orienteering competitor

Medal record

Men's orienteering

Representing Great Britain

World Championships
Silver medal – second place	1993 West Point	Relay

Martin "Bilbo" Bagness is a British orienteering competitor, known for being part of the silver medal-winning relay team at the 1993 World Orienteering Championships and winning two competitions at the British Orienteering Championships.

== Career ==
In June 1981, Bagness finished one minute behind champion Chris Hirst in the men's individual event of the British Orienteering Championships. The following year, he came second again to Hirst at the British Championships, finishing seven minutes after.

In April 1984, Bagness won the male competition at the Jan Kjellström International Festival of Orienteering, representing the Airienteers club. He finished first on both days of the competition. In June, he won the men's individual event of the British Orienteering Championships. He entered the men's event of the Australian Orienteering Championships in October of that year and finished in first place.

Bagness entered and won the British Orienteering Championships again in March 1985. He entered the men's individual competition of the 1985 World Orienteering Championships, but fell during the race and lost. Bagness entered the World Orienteering Championships again in 1987. He finished in 16th place, but was the best placed British representative in the competition.

In 1990, The Daily Telegraph reported that Bagness had retired from international competitions. However, he continued to enter, finishing 55th in the men's competition at the 1992 Orienteering World Cup.

Bagness entered the relay race of the 1993 World Championships on a team with Jonathan Musgrave, Stephen Palmer and Steven Hale. They finished in second place, 15 seconds behind the winning team.

== Mapping ==
Martin Bagness has mapped many of the orienteering areas in the South Lake District, in the territory of LOC (Lakeland Orienteering Club), as well as in many other parts of the UK, notably Scotland. His maps are known for their undisputable accuracy, and unique but intuitive style of crag mapping whereby only crags notable within the nearby vicinity are marked, resulting in a non-standard representation of crags across the map, however avoiding having sections of map with too many or too little crags, improving overall readability and ease to understand the terrain.
