= Charlotte Ward (orienteer) =

British orienteering competitor

Personal information
- Nationality: British
- Born: 1992 (age 33–34) Beverley, East Riding of Yorkshire

Sport
- Sport: Orienteering
Medal record
Women's orienteering
Representing United Kingdom
World Championships
Silver medal – second place	2022 Triangle Region	Sprint Relay
World Games
Bronze medal – third place	2022 Birmingham	Mixed sprint relay
World University Championships
Gold medal – first place	2016 Miskolc	Sprint Relay

Charlotte Ward (born 1992) is a British orienteering competitor. She was part of the British team that came second in the sprint relay at the 2022 World Orienteering Championships. Her team included Megan Carter Davies, Kris Jones and Ralph Street.

Ward competes for HALO orienteering club. She has won the sprint discipline at both the British Orienteering Championships and the JK Orienteering Festival.

Ward announced her retirement from international orienteering on 29 July 2024.
