= Potteries Orienteering Club =

Orienteering club in England

- Founded: 1975
- Type: Orienteering club
- Region served: United Kingdom
- Website: POTOC Club Website

The Potteries Orienteering Club, often abbreviated to POTOC, is an Orienteering club in the West Midlands of the UK. It is for Orienteers in or around north Staffordshire and south Cheshire. The club is in the West Midlands Orienteering Association (WMOA) and is a member of the BOF. The club has been Clubmark accredited. The club has a Newsletter Called 'The Potter'.

== Structure ==
POTOC is run by a committee, which is elected at the AGM in October. It is governed by a formal constitution which states the official club name and affiliations and also the voting rights at the AGM.

== Events ==
The Club Holds three types of events with varying frequency;

- Local Events, are held every month, these are suitable for beginners and often do not have the technical difficulty to host the harder courses that experienced orienteers require, but are fantastic for beginners with club coaches helping them.
- District Events, these are more formal and less frequent with courses for the more experienced as well as beginner.
- Regional Events, these are held once a year and have very technically challenging courses and take the most planning.

== Logo ==
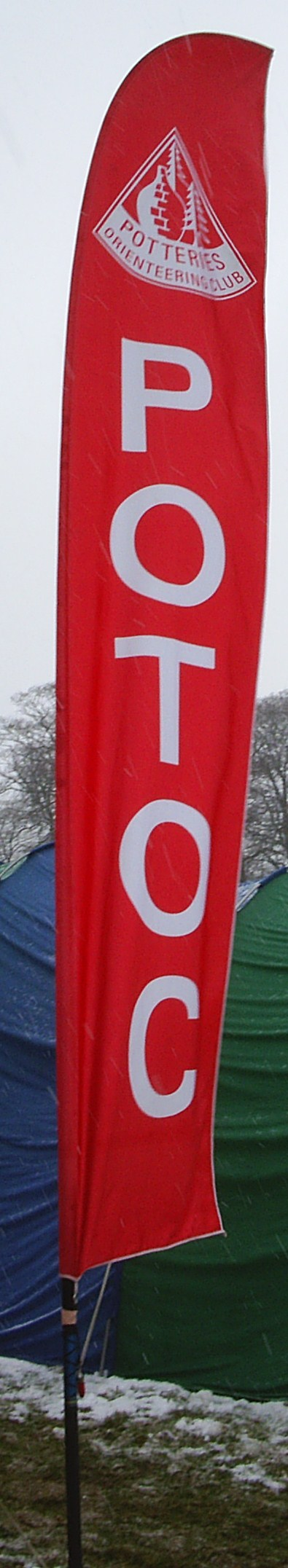
Potoc Flag at the JK2008

The Main Club logo consists of a Bottle Oven with two Fir trees, this is used on Various Club items such as the Flag and Clothing. The club sells its own Sweatshirts and T-shirts these display the Official Club insignia. At Major events the Club uses its red tent and Flag.

== Permanent Courses ==
The club has a number of permanent courses that have maps that can be freely downloaded and accessed from the club website:

- Apedale
- Bathpool Park
- Biddulph Grange
- Brough Park
- Downs Banks
- Ladderedge
- Hanley Forest Park

== Awards and Trophies ==
The Club awards a series of trophies that are bestowed at the Christmas Social. There are Senior and Junior male and female trophies, a Novice trophy, and a Wooden spoon and bowl award for the biggest mistake of the season.
