= Jenny James (orienteer) =

British orienteer

Sport
- Sport: Orienteering
Medal record
Representing Great Britain
Women's orienteering
European Championships
Bronze medal – third place	2000 Truskavets	Relay

Jenny James is a British orienteer.

She competed at the 1999 World Orienteering Championships in Inverness, where she placed fourth in the relay with the British team.

She won a bronze medal in the relay with the British team at the 2000 European Orienteering Championships in Truskavets, along with Yvette Baker and Heather Monro.

At the 2001 World Orienteering Championships in Tampere, she placed fifth with the British relay team.

She was British Champion in 2001, and Nights Champion in 1997 and 2000.
