= Kristian Jones =

British orienteer

Personal information
- Nationality: British
- Born: 3 April 1991 (age 35)

Sport
- Sport: Orienteering
Medal record
Men's orienteering
Representing Great Britain
World Championships
Silver medal – second place	2022 Triangle Region	Sprint Relay
European Championships
Bronze medal – third place	2018 Ticino	Sprint
World University Championships
Gold medal – first place	2016 Miskolc	Sprint
Gold medal – first place	2016 Miskolc	Sprint Relay
Junior World Championships
Silver medal – second place	2010 Aalborg	Sprint

Kristian Jones or Kris Jones (born 3 April 1991) is a competitor in orienteering and athletics, competing for Great Britain. He also competes for Lillomarka OK in Norway, Forth Valley orienteers and Wales.

== Orienteering ==
Jones has had most success in Sprint Orienteering, winning medals in the European Championships and the Junior World Championships, and winning the Jan Kjellstrom Orienteering Festival Sprint 3 times in a row from 2016 to 2018. He also has success in the British Orienteering Championships, winning both the Middle and Sprint twice.

in 2016, Jones came 4th in all 3 disciplines he competed in (Sprint, Mixed Sprint Relay and Relay) at the World Championships in Stromstad, Sweden, the closest he has come to a medal in the World Orienteering Championships.

In 2018, Jones received a bronze medal at the European Championships, after Daniel Hubmann and Matthias Kyburz (both from Switzerland) shared the gold medal. He also won the first leg of the Jukola relay, although his team were eventually disqualified.

In 2022, Jones was a part of the Great Britain team that came second in the Sprint Relay at the World Orienteering Championships, along with Charlotte Ward, Ralph Street and Megan Carter Davies. Jones finished the penultimate leg with a one second lead over the Swedish team, but Tove Alexandersson won the last leg, leading Sweden to victory. Jones also placed third in the sprint discipline before being disqualified.

== Athletics ==
In Athletics, Jones was selected to run the 10,000m at the European Cup for Great Britain in 2017, held in Minsk. He did not finish due to a calf injury. The injury also forced him to miss the World Sprint Orienteering Championships three weeks later.

In December 2018, Jones was a last minute call up for the British team at the 2018 European Cross Country Championships in Tilburg. He exceeded expectations, coming 12th in the senior men's race and becoming the 2nd counter for Great Britain as they won the silver in the team competition.

On 17 October 2020, Jones competed in the 2020 World Athletics Half Marathon Championships for Great Britain. The race was held in Gdynia, Poland, having been postponed due to COVID-19. Jones placed 60th in the Elite race, in a time of 1:03:05.

In 2022, Jones came fifth at the 2022 World Mountain and Trail Running Championships in the 40k event, and won a Bronze medal in the Team Short Trail with Jonathan Albon and Billy Cartwright.

Jones also competed in the 2023 World Mountain and Trail Running Championships, where he came 8th in the short trail competition and won the gold medal for the team competition in the same event along with Jonathan Albon and Thomas Roach.
