= Van Dongen =

Van Dongen is a Dutch toponymic surname meaning "from/of Dongen", a town in North Brabant. People with the surname include:

- Cees van Dongen (1932–2011), Dutch motorcycle racer
- Danny van Dongen (born 1983), Dutch racing driver
- Dionys van Dongen (1748–1819), Dutch marine and genre painter
- Eef van Dongen (born 1993), Dutch orienteering medalist
- Frits van Dongen (born 1946), Dutch architect
- Frits van Dongen (actor), pseudonym of Hein van der Niet (1901–1975), Dutch actor known in Hollywood as Philip Dorn
- Guus van Dongen née Preitinger (1878–1946), Dutch modern painter, wife of Kees van Dongen
- H. R. Van Dongen (1920–2010), American book cover artist
- Helen van Dongen (1909–2006), Dutch film editor
- Henk van Dongen (1936–2011), Dutch organizational theorist
- Iris van Dongen (born 1975), Dutch visual artist
- John van Dongen (born 1949), Canadian (British Columbia) politician
- Jolanda van Dongen (born 1966), Dutch racing cyclist
- Jules van Dongen (born 1990), Dutch-American darts player
- Kees van Dongen (1877–1968), Dutch Fauvist painter working in France
- Leo van Dongen (1942–2011), Dutch racing cyclist
- Merel van Dongen (born 1993), Dutch football midfielder
- Peter van Dongen (born 1966), Dutch cartoonist and illustrator
- Renée van Dongen (born 1977), Dutch singer-songwriter known as Charlie Dée
- Wies van Dongen (1931–2022), Dutch racing cyclist

== See also ==
- Van Donge & De Roo Stadion, football stadium in Rotterdam
