= Steven Hale =

British orienteering competitor

Medal record

Men's orienteering

Representing Great Britain

World Championships
Silver medal – second place	1993 West Point	Relay

Nordic Championships
Gold medal – first place	2001 Mikkeli	Relay

Steven Hale (born 9 September 1963) is a British orienteering competitor.

He received a silver medal in relay at the 1993 World Orienteering Championships in West Point, together with Martin Bagness, Stephen Palmer and Jonathan Musgrave, only 15 seconds behind the Swiss winning team. He finished 6th in the relay in 1995, 6th in 1997, and 5th in 1999.

His best individual result is the 4th place in the short course in the 1993 world championships (shared with Jon Tvedt, only one second behind bronze medal winner Martin Johansson). In 1999 he finished 8th in the short course, and 12th in the classic course.

In domestic orienteering competition, Hale won the overall title at the JK Orienteering Festival 4 times in a row between 1990 and 1993, a feat only matched by Rolf Pettersson. He also won the British Orienteering Championships in 1988, 1989 and 1990, and the British nights championships in 1986 and 1987.

== See also ==
- British orienteers
- List of orienteers
- List of orienteering events
