= Jonathan Musgrave =

British orienteering competitor

Medal record

Men's orienteering

Representing United Kingdom

World Championships
Silver medal – second place	1993 West Point	Relay

Jonathan Musgrave is a British orienteering competitor.

He received a silver medal in relay at the 1993 World Orienteering Championships in West Point, together with Martin Bagness, Stephen Palmer and Steven Hale, only 15 seconds behind the Swiss winning team. He finished 6th in the relay in 1995, and also 6th in 1997.

Musgrave won the British Orienteering Championships in 1995.

== See also ==
- British orienteers
- List of orienteers
- List of orienteering events
