= Jenny James =

Jenny James may refer to:

- Jennifer James (born 1977), English actress
- Jenny James (orienteer), British orienteer
- Jenny James (born 1942), founder of the Atlantis commune
- Jenny James (swimmer) (1927 - 2014), in 1951 the first Welsh person to swim the English Channel
