= Eef van Dongen =

Dutch orienteering competitor

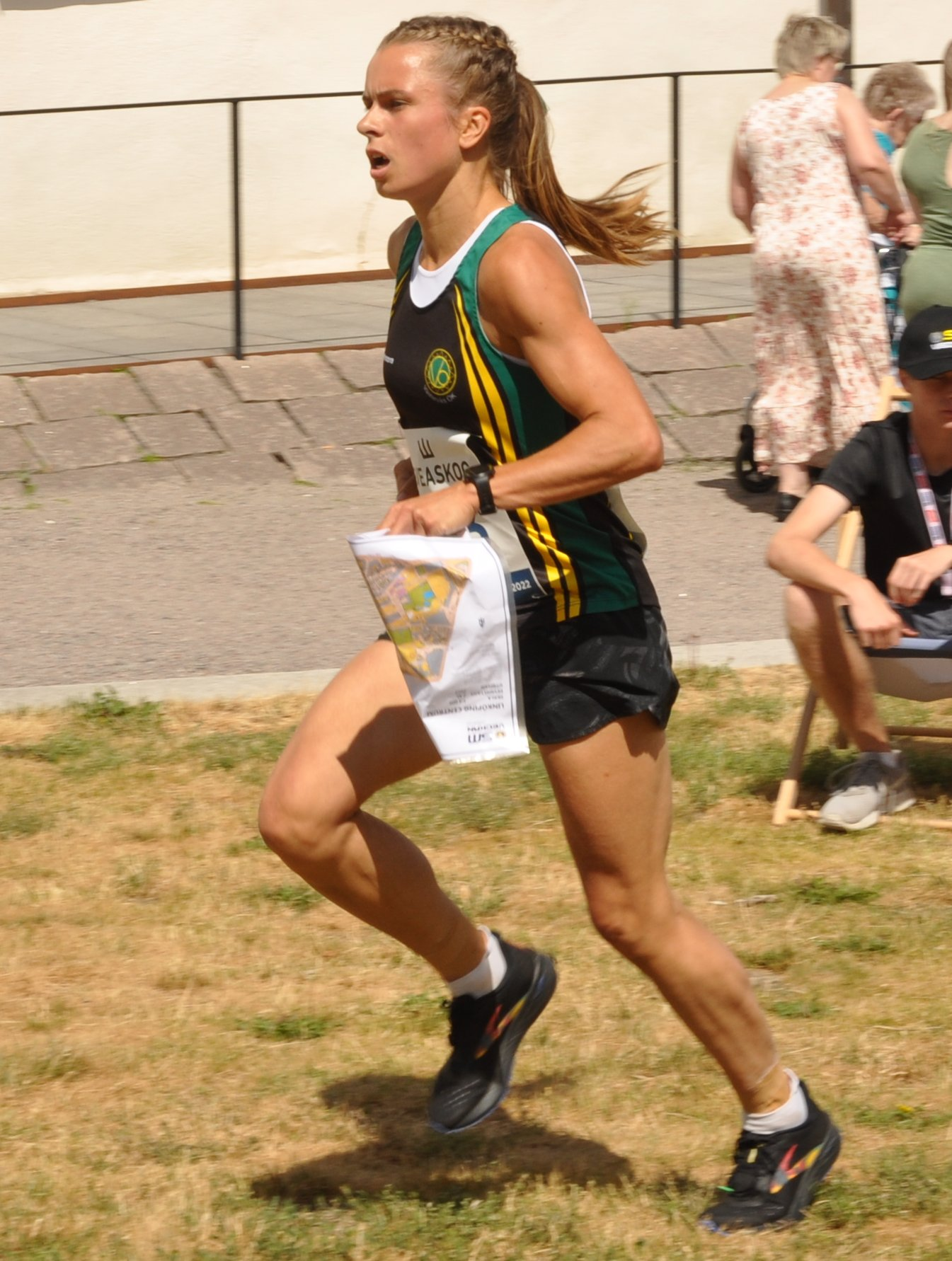

Personal information
- Nationality: Dutch
- Born: 17 October 1993 (age 32)

Sport
- Sport: Orienteering
Medal record
Women's orienteering
Representing Netherlands
World Orienteering Championships
Bronze medal – third place	2022 Triangle Region	Knock-out Sprint

Eef van Dongen (born 17 October 1993) is a Dutch orienteering competitor. She received a bronze medal at the first ever knock-out sprint event at the 2022 World Orienteering Championships, behind Tove Alexandersson and Megan Carter Davies. On club level, van Dongen competes for both Västerviks OK (in Sweden) and OLifant (in the Netherlands).

Van Dongen is the first Dutch orienteer to receive a medal in the World Championships; the Netherlands has low participation in orienteering, with only 450 registered members as of 2022. In an interview in the lead up to the 2022 World Games, van Dongen indicated that she only started orienteering in 2018 after meeting her partner, Simon Jakobsson. She attended a training camp in Zürich in spring 2018, and decided to focus on sprint orienteering. Having run less than 10 sprint races, van Dongen attended her first World Orienteering Championships in 2021 .

As a child, Eef van Dongen participated in volleyball and judo, and more recently has been involved in endurance running and skating. She works as a researcher in glaciology at the Stockholm University, and as a modeler at the Swedish Meteorological and Hydrological Institute.
