= Daniel Marston =

British orienteering competitor

Medal record

Men's orienteering

Representing United Kingdom

World Championships
Bronze medal – third place	2003 Rapperswil/Jona	Relay

Daniel Marston is a British orienteering competitor. He received a bronze medal in relay at the 2003 World Orienteering Championships in Rapperswil-Jona, together with Jon Duncan and Jamie Stevenson. He finished 5th in the relay in 2004.

Marston's best individual world championship result was 14th place in the long course in 2003.

In domestic orienteering, Marston has won the British Championships once, in 2002.

== See also ==
- British orienteers
- List of orienteers
- List of orienteering events
