= 2022 World Orienteering Championships =

2022 edition of the World Orienteering Championships

- Location: Triangle Region, Denmark
- Dates: 26–30 June

The 2022 World Orienteering Championships were held from 26 to 30 June 2022 in the Triangle Region, Denmark. This was the first World Orienteering Championships with only sprint races, and the first to include a knock-out sprint event.

== Schedule ==
Date	Event	Location
26 June	Sprint relay	Kolding
27 June	Rest day	
28 June	Knockout sprint	Fredericia
29 June	Rest day	
30 June	Sprint	Vejle

== Medal summary ==
=== Medal table ===
Rank	Nation	Gold	Silver	Bronze	Total
1	Sweden	2	2	1	5
2	Great Britain	1	2	1	4
3	Switzerland	1	1	0	2
4	Norway	1	0	1	2
5	Belgium	0	0	1	1
5	Netherlands	0	0	1	1
Totals (6 entries)		5	5	5	15

=== Men ===
Event	Gold	Silver	Bronze
Knock out sprint	Matthias Kyburz; Switzerland	August Mollén; Sweden	Jonatan Gustafsson; Sweden
Sprint	Kasper Fosser; Norway	Gustav Bergman; Sweden	Yannick Michiels; Belgium

=== Women ===
Event	Gold	Silver	Bronze
Knock out sprint	Tove Alexandersson; Sweden	Megan Carter Davies; Great Britain	Eef van Dongen; Netherlands
Sprint	Megan Carter Davies; Great Britain	Simona Aebersold; Switzerland	Alice Leake; Great Britain

=== Mixed ===
Event	Gold		Silver		Bronze	
Sprint relay	Sweden; Lina Strand; Max Peter Bejmer; Gustav Bergman; Tove Alexandersson	58:39	United Kingdom; Charlotte Ward; Ralph Street; Kris Jones; Megan Carter Davies	+1:02	Norway; Ane Dyrkorn; Lukas Liland; Kasper Fosser; Andrine Benjaminsen	+1:41
