= Priddy Mineries =

Nature reserve in Somerset, England

Coordinates: 51.26085°N 2.65059°W

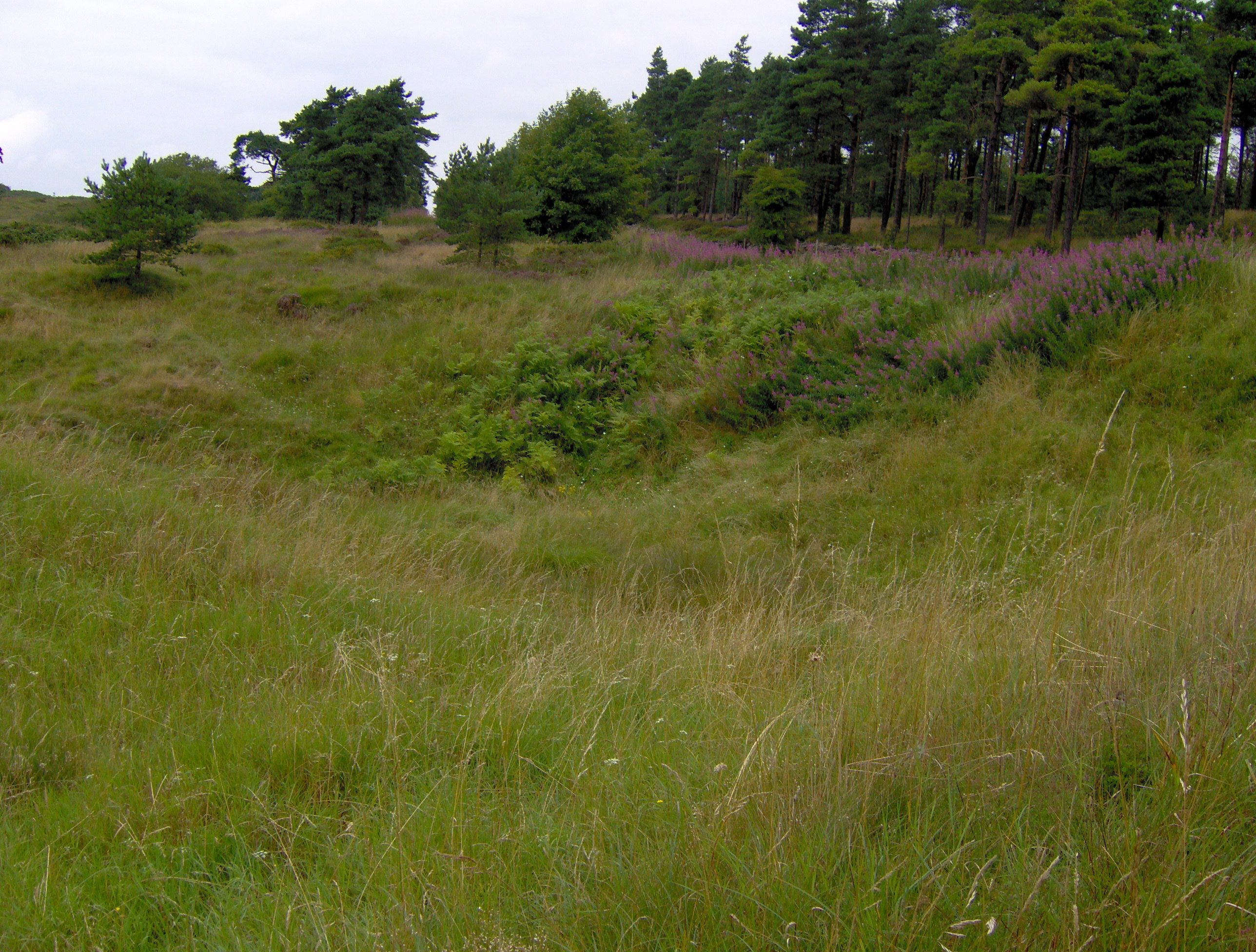
Priddy Mineries

Priddy Mineries (grid reference ST547515) is a nature reserve previously run by the Somerset Wildlife Trust. It is in the village of Priddy, on the Mendip Hills in Somerset.

The reserve lies 3 miles north of Wells and 1.5 miles east of the village of Priddy. It is a site of 50 ha (123 acres) and is part of the Priddy Pools Site of Special Scientific Interest (SSSI). It is mostly grassland / heather mosaic with an area of valley mire and some nutrient-poor pools. The site is one of the beauty spots of Mendip partly due to these pools with the changing colours of the vegetation and the pines and the heather slopes. It is adjacent to Stock Hill woodland, and one of the paths form part of the long distance national footpath, the Monarch's Way.

There are wide range of plant and small animal species. More than 20 species of dragonflies have been recorded, most of them breeding on site. In particular this is the only site in the Mendips for the Downy Emerald. There are numerous species of water bug including Water stick-insect (Ranatra linearis) and also all British species of amphibian, except for the Natterjack Toad, in good breeding numbers.

The site was worked for lead for many centuries, probably 2000 years until 1908, and the earlier workings were obliterated by those of the Victorians which left a legacy of pools, mounds and spoil heaps. The buddle pits and condensation flues are the remains of the Waldegrave lead works of that time. The site is of great interest to industrial archaeologists and also to cavers on account of the existence of Waldegrave swallet (opened 1934) and the possible rediscovery of Five Buddles Sink or Thomas Bushell’s Swallet (named after the man who first discovered it).

A barrow or Tumulus can be found in the northern part of the Reserve.
