= English Orienteering Council =

- Founded: 1973
- Type: Orienteering club
- Region served: England

The English Orienteering Council has sole responsibility for the English teams.

The 9 English regions of the British Orienteering Federation (BOF) are Members of English Orienteering Council (EOC). Its voting members are representatives of each of the nine English regions of the BOF. The Council meets each year at the Jan Kjellström International Orienteering Festival to make policy decisions. EOC is not a National Association or Governing Body, this is different from the other Home Countries.

== Funding ==
EOC receives no funding from Sport England or from BOF. More than 60% of the funds for EOC come from the personal contributions of athletes and less than a third comes from the English regional Orienteering Associations. Some further funds come from personal or group fund-raising projects or from a fund surplus after a major orienteering event.
