= Berrington, Northumberland =

Village in Northumberland, England

Coordinates: 55.685°N 1.994°W

Berrington
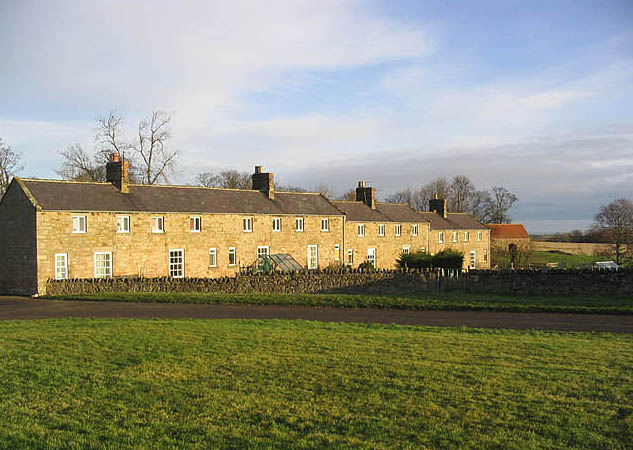
- Houses at Berrington

- Location within Northumberland
- OS grid reference: NU005435
- Civil parish: Kyloe
- Unitary authority: Northumberland
- Ceremonial county: Northumberland
- Region: North East
- Country: England
- Sovereign state: United Kingdom
- Post town: BERWICK-UPON-TWEED
- Postcode district: TD15
- Police: Northumbria
- Fire: Northumberland
- Ambulance: North East
- UK Parliament: Berwick-upon-Tweed

Berrington is a village in Northumberland, in England. It is situated to the south of Berwick-upon-Tweed, inland from the North Sea coast.

== Governance ==
Berrington is in the parliamentary constituency of Berwick-upon-Tweed.

== Landmarks ==
The Devil's Causeway passes the eastern edge of the settlement. The causeway is a Roman road which starts at Port Gate on Hadrian's Wall, north of Corbridge, and extends 55 miles (89 km) northwards across Northumberland to the mouth of the River Tweed at Berwick-upon-Tweed.

Media related to Berrington, Northumberland at Wikimedia Commons
