= Hannah Mitchell =

English suffragette and socialist

- Born: 11 February 1872; Hope Woodlands, England
- Died: 22 October 1956 (aged 84); Manchester, England
- Occupation: Dressmaker
- Known for: Suffragette, councillor
- Political party: Independent Labour Party
- Spouse: Gibbon Mitchell
- Children: 1

Hannah Mitchell (11 February 1872 – 22 October 1956) was an English suffragette and socialist. Born into a poor farming family in Derbyshire, Mitchell left home at a young age to work as a seamstress in Bolton, where she became involved in the socialist movement. She worked for many years in organisations related to socialism, women's suffrage and pacifism. After World War I she was elected to Manchester City Council and worked as a magistrate, before later working for Labour Party leader, Keir Hardie.

== Biography ==
=== Early life ===
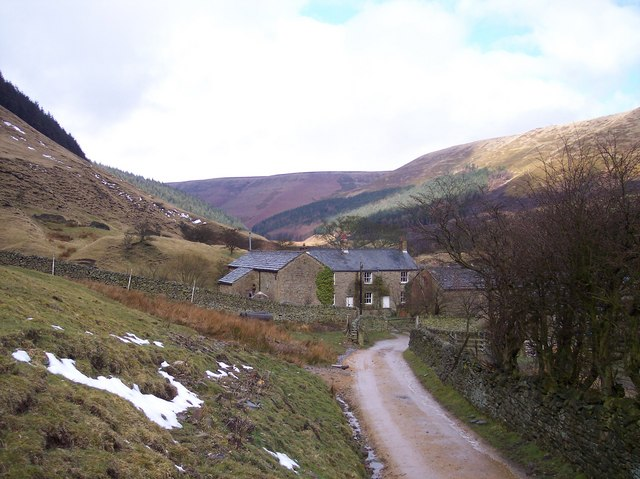
Her birthplace was at Alport Castles Farm

Hannah Webster was born on 11 February 1872 to Benjamin and Ann Webster in a farmhouse named after and just below Alport Castles in Hope Woodlands, in the Derbyshire Peak District. The daughter of a farmer, she was the fourth of six children. Her mother had a temper especially with her last three children, Hannah, Sarah and Benjamin. Webster was not permitted a formal education, although her father who was mild mannered taught her to read. Hannah stayed at home performing domestic duties with her mother, with whom she did not get on. She was expected to look after her father and brothers, which she resented.

Early on Mitchell became acutely aware of gender inequality in the domestic sphere. She also observed the seemingly inevitable early marriages of girls around her to "farm lads", to avoid having children out of wedlock, and was keen to avoid the same fate. She later said in her autobiography that her mother was a bad-tempered and violent woman who sometimes made her children sleep in the barn. When she was 13 she became an apprentice dressmaker, to earn extra money for her impoverished family. In Glossop, her mistress was an older crippled seamstress, Miss Brown. Mitchell wrote that her approach was a contrast to her mother and she gently taught "that work could also be a pleasure."

At the age of 14, after an argument with her mother, she left home and went to live with her brother William and family in Glossop and at nineteen moved into Bolton, Lancashire, where she found work as a dressmaker 'earning ten shillings a week' and in domestic service.

=== Marriage and socialism ===
In Bolton, Mitchell started improving her education, originally hoping to become a teacher. One job she had was in the household of a schoolmaster, who allowed her to borrow his books. She became involved in the socialist movement and spoke up for shorter hours and a half-day off (paid) weekly for shop workers, and commented that the working conditions of women in the garment industry included not only poor pay and conditions, also required strict silence and fines "enforced by a thin-liped shrew of a woman."

Mitchell also attended The Labour Church. She was particularly influenced by Robert Blatchford's newspaper The Clarion. At one meeting she attended, she heard Katharine Glasier speak.

In the house where she lodged, she met a tailor's cutter called Gibbon Mitchell, and both were known to Richard Pankhurst, supporting his interest in Kinder Scout area. Although she was cautious about marriage, from her observations of her family members, the young couple both longed for their own home. They married in Hayfield parish church in 1895, Hannah wearing a grey dress and matching velvet hat, and she gave birth to a son, Frank Gibbon Mitchell in 1896. Because of the difficulty of this birth and the reluctance to bring more children into poverty, Mitchell resolved to have no more. She and her husband agreed to use birth control and had no further children. As well as their son, the Mitchells also cared for an orphaned niece.

She soon found herself disillusioned by marriage. Although her husband initially agreed to her requests for an equal division of labour in their household, she found that reality did not quite live up to this ideal. She continued to work as a seamstress to supplement Gibbon's meagre earnings, and found the rest of her time taken up with household chores. Like other women in the socialist movement, Mitchell struggled to convince male socialists of the importance of feminist issues.

The couple moved to Newhall, Derbyshire where socialists in this mining area co-funded a hall for meetings, and speakers often were accommodated with the Mitchells. In 1900 they moved to Ashton-under-Lyne, near Manchester, where Gibbon worked in the tailoring section of the Co-operative store. Mitchell herself began to speak publicly at meetings of the Independent Labour Party (ILP). She was appointed by the party as Poor Law Guardian for their town in 1904.

=== Role in women's suffrage movement ===
Mitchell then joined, and worked as a part-time organiser for, Emmeline and Christabel Pankhurst's Women's Social and Political Union (WSPU). Although initially unsure about the 'property qualification' proposals expected to be acceptable, Mitchell wanted a truer equality for all male and female voters. But hearing Annie Kenney's talk at Stalybridge Market she noted that despite appearing charmed by the speaker, the majority would support getting votes for all men (Manhood Suffrage) and make the women wait even longer to be enfranchised. Mitchell also toured the country including the working class villages in Colne Valley making speeches, herself, and 'had no difficulty' including 'dealing with hecklers' as she campaigned for women's suffrage at by-elections.

In 1905, Mitchell joined Emmeline Pankhurst, Annie Kenney, Keir Hardie, Theresa Billington and Mrs Elmy at the prison gates when Christabel Pankhurst was released after a week of imprisonment for the first assault in the cause, spitting at a policeman. She was again with the 150 women who tried in October 1905, to enter the House of Commons, and only 20 were allowed in, including Mitchell. With Louie CulIen, Mitchell had hidden a 'Votes for Women" banner in her clothes. Mary Gawthorpe stood on a chair to make a speech after their leaders told them that Prime Minister Henry Campbell-Bannerman was not presenting a women's suffrage Bill, and was pulled down by police, the two banners were raised up but police tore them down into 'shreds'. She was shocked to see the rough treatment of Mrs Pankhurst and that the Members of Parliament quickly came to watch "most of them guffawing loudly'. Mitchell was then campaigning in Huddersfield by-election where 'Yorkshire women heard the call and followed us in hundreds'. Mitchell also was involved with the Liverpool branch started up by Alice Morrissey. In 1907 Mitchell suffered a nervous breakdown which her doctor put down to overwork and malnourishment. While she was recovering, Charlotte Despard visited her and gave her money for food. In her autobiography she mentioned the hurt that she felt when none of the Pankhursts contacted her during her recovery. In 1908 she left the WSPU, and joined Despard's new Women's Freedom League.

During the First World War, Mitchell supported the pacifist movement volunteering for organisations such as the ILP No Conscription Fellowship and the Women's International League. In 1918 she started to work with the ILP again and in 1924 they nominated her as a member of Manchester City Council. She was elected and served until 1935. She became a magistrate in 1926, and served in that capacity for the next 20 years.

=== Later life ===
On 9 May 1939, Mitchell helped to organise a meeting of 40 ex-suffragettes in Manchester. Towards the end of the Second World War, she began work on her autobiography, which remained unpublished in her lifetime. After the war, she began writing for The Northern Voice and Manchester City News. In the last years of her life, Hannah lived in Newton Heath. There is a blue plaque on the house at 18 Ingham Street, Newton Heath dedicated to her, where she wrote her autobiography "The Hard Way Up".

Mitchell died on 22 October 1956 at home in Manchester. Her autobiography, The Hard Way Up, the Autobiography of Hannah Mitchell, Suffragette and Rebel, was edited by her grandson and published in 1968. There is also a blue plaque dedicated to her on the wall of the house that she lived in with her family in Ashton-under-Lyne between 1900 and 1910.

=== Hannah Mitchell Foundation ===
2012 saw the formation of the Hannah Mitchell Foundation, a forum for the development of devolved government in the North of England. The name was chosen "in memory of an outstanding Northern socialist, feminist and co-operator who was proud of her working class roots and had a cultural as well as political vision."
