= Listed buildings in Hope Woodlands =

Hope Woodlands is a civil parish in the High Peak district of Derbyshire, England. The parish contains eight listed buildings that are recorded in the National Heritage List for England. All the listed buildings are designated at Grade II, the lowest of the three grades, which is applied to "buildings of national importance and special interest". The parish consists of moorland and countryside, and there are no significant settlements. The listed buildings consist of farmhouses, farm buildings, a milestone, and two bridges.

== Buildings ==
Name and location	Photograph	Date	Notes
Packhorse bridge 53.45262°N 1.74657°W		1672	The bridge was moved to its present site in 1959. It is in gritstone and consists of two segmental arches. The bridge has cutwaters on both sides, a string band, chamfered copings, and diagonal stepped wing walls. On the bridge is a memorial plaque.
Gillott Hey Farmhouse; 53.40303°N 1.78449°W	—	Early 19th century	The farmhouse is in gritstone with a stone slate roof. There are two storeys, an L-shaped plan, and an outshut added in the angle. In the centre is a porch, and a doorway with a quoined surround, and the windows are mullioned with two lights and top-hung casements.
Upper Ashop Farmhouse; 53.39880°N 1.78686°W		Early 19th century	The farmhouse is in gritstone, and has a stone slate roof with coped gables and kneelers. There are two storeys and three bays. The central doorway has a quoined surround, above it is a single-light window, and the other windows are mullioned with two casements.
Milestone; 53.41143°N 1.83193°W		1828	The milestone is on the south side of Snake Road (A57 road). It is in gritstone with a triangular plan, and is inscribed with the distances to Manchester and Sheffield, the names of the cities abbreviated.
Rowlee Bridge; 53.39829°N 1.77644°W		c. 1830	The bridge carries a road over the River Ashop, it is in gritstone and consists of two segmental arches. The bridge has voussoirs, a band, semicircular cutwaters, and curved wing walls with stone coping.
Rowlee Farmhouse and wall 53.40076°N 1.77044°W		1849	The farmhouse is in gritstone on a chamfered plinth, with quoins, and a stone slate roof with coped gables and kneelers. There are two storeys, a double depth plan, and a front of three bays, the middle bay projecting and gabled, with a dated shield in the gable. In the centre is a recessed porch with a Tudor arch, a chamfered surround, and a hood mould, and the windows are sashes. To the south is a curved boundary wall with iron railings and gate piers.
Barns north of Rowlee Farmhouse; 53.40093°N 1.77074°W		Mid-19th century	The barns are in gritstone with quoins, a stone slate roof with finials, and two storeys. In the ground floor are doorways, one with a stable door, and casement windows, and the upper floor contains two circular windows and one square window.
Barns west of Rowlee Farmhouse; 53.40068°N 1.77089°W	—	Mid-19th century	The barns are in gritstone with quoins and a stone slate roof. There are two storeys, and a single-story bay to the north. The barns contain a central cart entrance, doors and windows, and in the upper floor are three circular windows and eight slit vents.
