= Fenwick, Kyloe =

Hamlet in Northumberland, England

Coordinates: 55.654425°N 1.898255°W

Fenwick
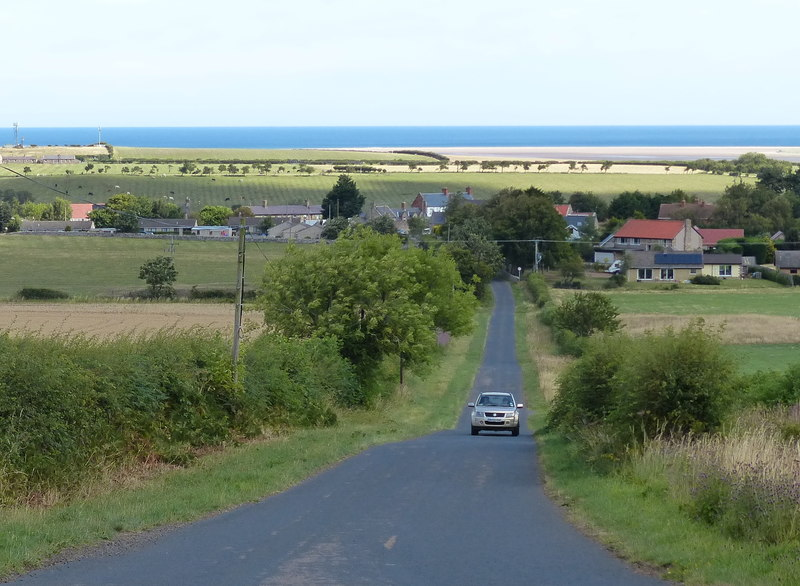
- Lane towards Fenwick

- Location within Northumberland
- OS grid reference: NU065401
- Civil parish: Kyloe
- Unitary authority: Northumberland
- Shire county: Northumberland
- Region: North East
- Country: England
- Sovereign state: United Kingdom
- Post town: Berwick-upon-Tweed
- Postcode district: TD15
- Dialling code: 01289
- Police: Northumbria
- Fire: Northumberland
- Ambulance: North East
- UK Parliament: North Northumberland

Fenwick is a hamlet in the civil parish of Kyloe near Berwick-upon-Tweed, in Northumberland, England. Fenwick lies only three miles from Holy Island, Lindisfarne and the world-famous heritage coastline. Fenwick lies alongside St Cuthberts Way, on which the monk St Cuthbert made his passage through Fenwick to the Holy Island. Fenwick's location meant it saw its fair share of skirmishes during the border raids from Scots.
