= Graham Gristwood =

British orienteering competitor

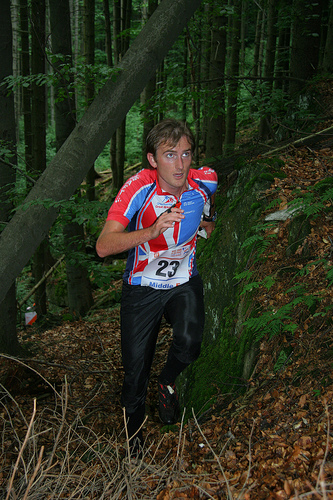
- Gristwood at WOC 2008 (Middle distance)

Personal information
- Nationality: British
- Born: 1984 (age 41–42)

Sport
- Sport: Orienteering
Medal record
Men's orienteering
Representing Great Britain
World Championships
| Gold medal – first place | 2008 Olomouc | Relay |

Graham Gristwood (born 1984) is a British orienteering competitor and world champion.

Graham is a member of the Great Britain Orienteering Squad and also runs for IFK Lidingö SOK. In 2004 Graham first made the senior World Champs team. His first notable successes came in 2006 where he won both the Sprint and the Overall title at the Jan Kjellstrom orienteering festival. He has since won another title in both the Sprint and the Overall.

He received a gold medal in the relay event at the 2008 World Orienteering Championships in Olomouc, together with Jon Duncan and Jamie Stevenson.

Graham attended the Royal Grammar School, Guildford. Graham did a masters at Sheffield Hallam University and ran for Sheffield University Orienteering Club. In 2010 he was part of the winning JK and Harvester relay teams. Currently he runs for Forth Valley.

Gristwood became only the second man after Chris Hirst to win the British Orienteering Championships four times in a row, between 2014 and 2017. He has also won the British Sprints twice, the British Middle once and the Night Championships a record seven times in a row.

== See also ==
- British orienteers
- List of orienteers
- List of orienteering events
