= Bollihope, Pikestone, Eggleston and Woodland Fells =

English Site of Special Scientific Interest

- Location within County Durham
- Location: MAGiC MaP
- Nearest town: Stanhope, County Durham
- Coordinates: 54°39′56″N 1°59′35″W
- Area: 7,949.19 ha (30.6920 sq mi)
- Established: 1996
- Governing body: Natural England
- Website: Bollihope, Pikestone, Eggleston and Woodland Fells SSSI

Bollihope, Pikestone, Eggleston and Woodland Fells is a Site of Special Scientific Interest in County Durham, England. It covers a broad expanse of moorland to the north and east of Middleton-in-Teesdale.

The site has a diverse mix of habitats, mainly dry heath, with wet heath and blanket-mire in areas that are poorly drained.

The SSSI, which is situated within the North Pennines Area of Outstanding Natural Beauty, shares a common boundary with the Upper Teesdale SSSI to the west, and adjoins Hamsterley Forest on three sides.

The area supports breeding populations of a number of species of birds that are listed in the United Kingdom's Red Data Book (Birds), including three—merlin, Eurasian golden plover and short-eared owl—that are listed in Annex 1 of the European Commission's Birds Directive as requiring special protection. The flora of the area includes a number of species that are scarce locally or nationally.
