= Jon Tvedt =

Norwegian orienteer and mountain runner

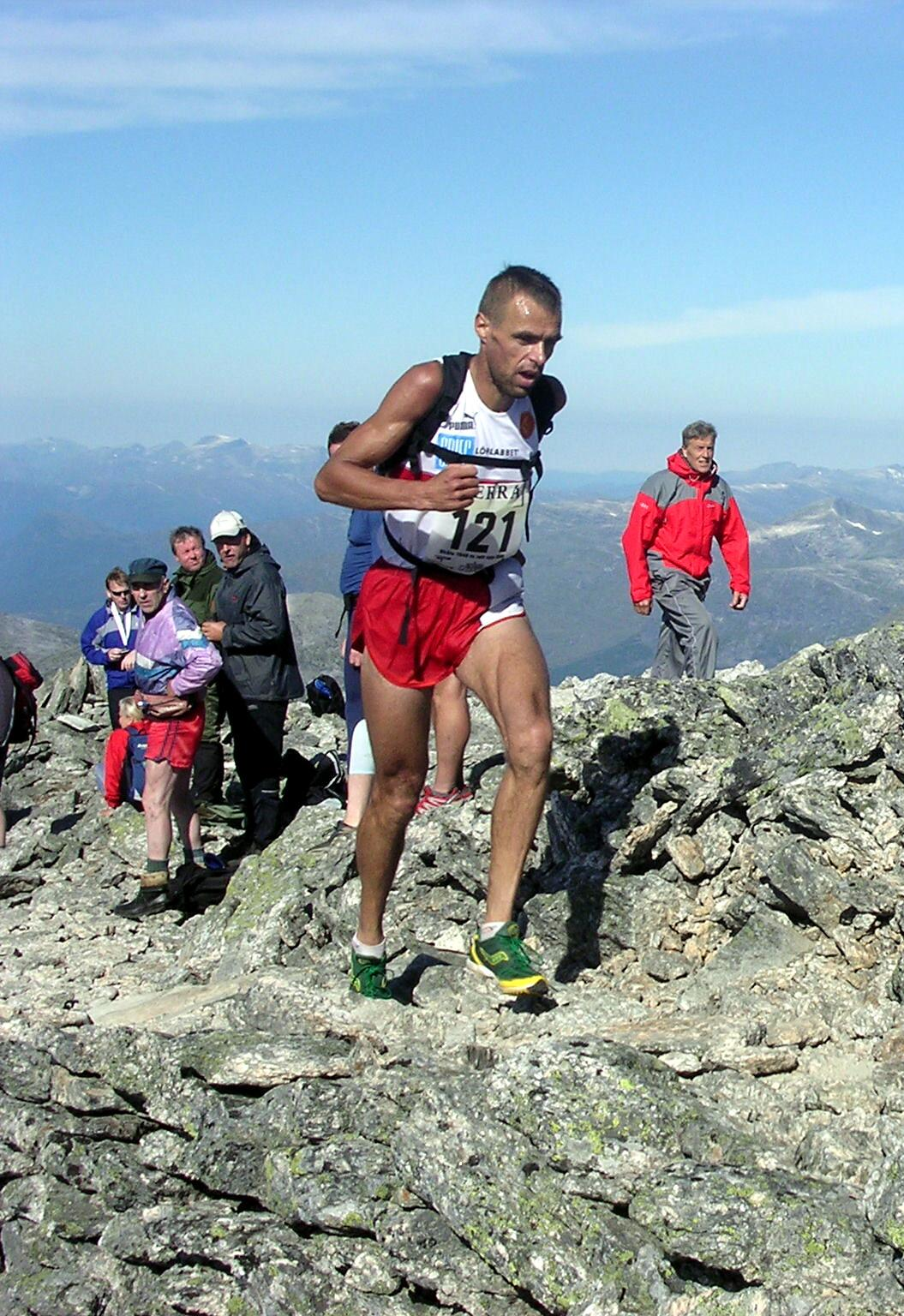
Jon Tvedt during a mountain run.

Jon Tvedt (29 June 1966 – 11 January 2009) was a Norwegian orienteering competitor and athlete who specialized in mountain running. He died while still active in his sport.

== Career ==
=== Orienteering ===
Tvedt originally competed in orienteering. At the 1993 World Orienteering Championships in West Point, Tvedt competed in three events. He finished fourth in the short distance, jointly with Steven Hale, and eleventh in the classic distance. In the relay he finished sixth together with teammates Rolf Vestre, Håvard Tveite and Petter Thoresen. At the 1995 World Orienteering Championships in Detmold, Tvedt finished eleventh in the short distance, sixth in the classic distance and fourth in the relay together with teammates Petter Thoresen, Håvard Tveite and Bjørnar Valstad. Finally, at the 1999 World Orienteering Championships in Inverness, Tvedt finished eighth in the classic distance. His best placement in the Orienteering World Cup was a fourteenth place overall, achieved in 1996.

=== Athletics ===
Tvedt later took up mountain running. He competed internationally at the European Championships in 2005 and 2007. In 2005 he finished twentieth in the individual race, and thirteenth in the team competition. In 2007 he finished twenty-eighth in the individual race, and tenth in the team competition.

In 1994 Tvedt won a bronze medal at the Norwegian championship in 12 kilometres cross-country running. In 1998 Tvedt won a silver medal at the Norwegian championship in 10 kilometres cross-country running, behind Karl Johan Rasmussen. He represented the club FIK BFG Fana. In 1999 he had changed club to IL Gular, and won a bronze medal at the national championship, in a race won by Abderrahim Goumri. He won the inaugural Norwegian mountain running championships in 2005, ahead of Odd-Bjørn Hjelmeset and Hans Martin Gjedrem of winter sports fame. Tvedt then defended his title three times.

== Death ==
Tvedt died in January 2009, during a training hike at Gullfjellet.
