= Catherine Taylor (orienteer) =

British orienteer

Personal information
- Born: 11 August 1989 (age 36)

Sport
- Sport: Orienteering
- Club: OK Linne; Lakeland Orienteering Club
Medal record
Women's orienteering
Representing Great Britain
European Championships
Bronze medal – third place	2014 Palmela	Long

Catherine Taylor or Cat Taylor (born 11 August 1989) is a British orienteer.

She made her international breakthrough by winning a bronze medal in the long distance at the 2014 European Orienteering Championships in Palmela. The next year at the 2015 World Orienteering Championships in Inverness, Scotland, she placed fifth in the middle distance and sixth in the long distance.

Taylor also won the 2012 British sprint Championships at University of York and has won the overall JK Title twice in 2013 and 2015.

She was a student at the University of Edinburgh from 2011 to 2012, and competed for EUOC.
