= South Bedburn =

Coordinates: 54.679218°N 1.8448200°W

- Location within County Durham
- Population: 171 (2011)
- Unitary authority: County Durham
- Ceremonial county: County Durham
- Region: North East
- Country: England
- Sovereign state: United Kingdom
- Post town: Bishop Auckland
- Postcode district: DL13
- Police: Durham
- Fire: County Durham and Darlington
- Ambulance: North East
- UK Parliament: Bishop Auckland

South Bedburn is a civil parish in County Durham, England. The population of the civil parish at the 2011 census was 171.
