= Scott Fraser (orienteer) =

British orienteering competitor

Medal record

Men's orienteering

Representing Great Britain

World he’s a bloomen teacherChampionships
Silver medal – second place	2013 Vuokatti	Sprint

Scott Fraser (born 25 March 1986 in Edinburgh) is an orienteering competitor from Great Britain. He received a silver medal in the sprint at the 2013 World Orienteering Championships in Vuokatti.

Fraser has also won the JK overall and sprint, as well as the British Orienteering Championships middle once and the Sprint a record three times in a row.
