= Heather Monro =

British orienteer

Medal record

Women's orienteering

Representing Great Britain

World Championships
Bronze medal – third place	2005 Aichi	Sprint

World Games
Bronze medal – third place	2005 Duisburg	Middle

World Cup
Bronze medal – third place	2000	WC Overall

European Championships
Bronze medal – third place	2000 Truskavets	Relay

Heather Monro (born 4 September 1971) was the second British female (Note: Yvette Hague was the first British orienteer to win a world championship medal.) orienteer to win a world championship medal. She came 5th at the World Orienteering Championships in 2001. At the 2003 World Orienteering Championships she was the highest placed British Female coming Fourteenth place over the 11.8 km race. At the 2005 World Orienteering Championships she took the bronze medal in the sprint distance. She also came third at the World Games in the same year.

One of Heather's most notable victories came in the 2003 O-Ringen. She has also won the British Orienteering Championships in all four individual disciplines, the only woman to do so, and has won the JK Orienteering Festival 5 times, as well as winning the inaugural JK Sprint.

She runs for South London Orienteers and Halden SK in Norway. She is a member of the British Athletes Commission (BAC) executive committee.
