= Speech House Oaks =

Protected area in Gloucestershire, England

- Site of Special Scientific Interest
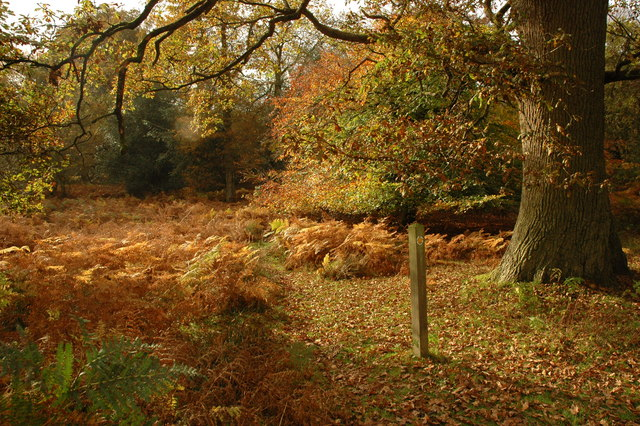
- Oak near Speech House in autumn colours

- Location within Gloucestershire
- Location of Speech House Oaks.
- Area of search: Gloucestershire
- Grid reference: SO622123
- Coordinates: 51.808503°N 2.548942°W
- Interest: Biological
- Area: 16.26 ha (40.2 acres)
- Notification date: 1972

Speech House Oaks (grid reference SO622123) is a 16.26-hectare (40.2-acre) biological Site of Special Scientific Interest in Gloucestershire, notified in 1972.

The site is listed in the 'Forest of Dean Local Plan Review' as a Key Wildlife Site (KWS).

== Location and habitat ==
The Speech House Oaks are located in the Forest of Dean, which is managed by the Forestry Commission. (All of the land within Speech House Oaks SSSI is owned by the Forestry Commission). The site is a linear band of open woodland of oak on either side of the Speech House Road near Speech House, and is close to the Forest of Dean Sculpture Trail.

The planting and careful management of the vast woodland of the Forest of Dean has been carried out for hundreds of years. This has resulted in a mosaic of different types of tree. The central area of the forest is on the Coal Measures and this supports oak. Such woodland has limited ground flora as this area is acid. Limestone and Old Red Sandstone rocks surround this central area. The soils in the surroundings are richer, and support a variety of tree types and a more abundant ground flora.

== Flora ==
The site is significant for epiphytic flora and supports a range of uncommon lichens and bryophytes. There is considered to be a low level of atmospheric pollution in this area, and, together with the ancient trees, this has encouraged a significant diversity of ephyitic flora (numbers are recorded and particular species listed).

The oaks and hollies are on acid loam which is poorly drained. There is bracken, bramble and common bent. This is the usual make-up of such areas which are grazed oak woodlands.

== Fauna ==
Old trees develop holes where they shed branches, and these are recorded nesting sites for particular birds such as the common redstart.

== SSSI Source ==
- Natural England SSSI information on the citation
- Natural England SSSI information on the Speech House Oaks units
