= Hamsterley, Bishop Auckland =

Village in Country Durham, England

Coordinates: 54°40′27″N 1°48′54″W

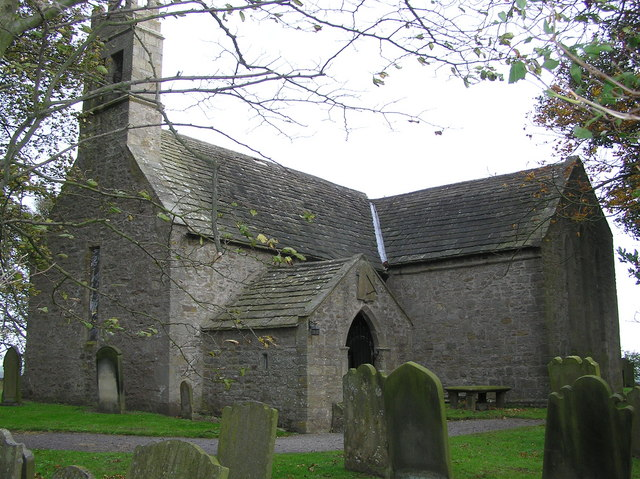
St James' Church, Hamsterley

Hamsterley is a village in County Durham, England. It is situated a few miles west of Bishop Auckland.

The village lies on a rise above the upper reaches of the Wear valley. To the west of the village the land rises to Hamsterley Common at the eastern edge of the fell country which lies between the valleys of the Wear and the Tees. In the centre of the village is a pub called the Cross Keys.

Near to the village is Dryderdale Hall, a grade II listed mansion built in 1872 by the architect Alfred Waterhouse for the Backhouse family. It was used as a location for the filming of Get Carter.

Hamsterley has a population of around 550, measured as 445 at the 2011 Census.

An episode of Time Team in 2008 examined a large stone structure in nearby Hamsterley Forest known as "the Castles", with walls five metres thick. It appears to date from the late Iron Age and may have been an animal enclosure. However the thickness of the walls suggests a more defensible purpose.
