= South London Orienteers =

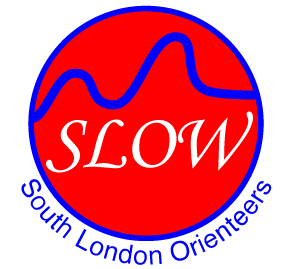
- Founded: 1976
- Type: Orienteering club
- Region served: South London

South London Orienteers (SLOW) is an orienteering club based in south London. Its members are based all over the south London area, with a particular concentration in the Kingston/Wimbledon/Richmond areas. The club also has several members in north London, and also in Surrey, as far out as Dorking and Guildford. SLOW currently have around 200 members, ranging from complete novices to international level orienteers - including the 2005 world championship bronze medalist Heather Monro.

SLOW was founded in 1976, when it was merged with the existing club Nutfielders OK. This former club is still remembered in the name of SLOW's annual premier orienteering race, the OK Nuts Trophy, which has been held annually since 1977.

The club was known as South London Orienteers and Wayfarers until 2010, when the last two words were dropped from the name.

The club organises a large number of events throughout the year, including orienteering races, training days, evening street events, and cross-country type fell races. Additionally, there are a large number of orienteering events staged all over the south-east run by other clubs, which SLOW members regularly compete at.

The club is a member of the South East Orienteering Association and the national governing body British Orienteering
