= Megan Mitchell (orienteer) =

British orienteering competitor

Personal information
- Nationality: British
- Born: Megan Carter-Davies; 1996 (age 29–30) Aberystwyth, United Kingdom
- Spouse: Ben Mitchell (m.2024)

Sport
- Sport: Orienteering
Medal record
Women's orienteering
Representing United Kingdom
World Championships
Gold medal – first place	2022 Triangle Region	Sprint
Silver medal – second place	2022 Triangle Region	Knock-out Sprint
Silver medal – second place	2022 Triangle Region	Sprint Relay
World University Championships
Gold medal – first place	2016 Miskolc	Sprint Relay

Megan Mitchell (née Carter-Davies; born 1996) is a British orienteering competitor. She became sprint world champion at the 2022 World Orienteering Championships. This made her only the third British athlete to become world champion in an individual discipline, after Yvette Hague and Jamie Stevenson.

Mitchell was born in Aberystwyth, United Kingdom. She competes for the orienteering clubs Swansea Bay OC (United Kingdom) and Halden Skiklubb (Norway). Mitchell attended the University of Bristol where she studied mathematics and was the captain of the orienteering club.

Mitchell first tried orienteering at the age of eight, joining Mid-Wales Orienteering club. She has been a member of the Welsh orienteering squad.

Mitchell won her first medals at the World Orienteering Championships in 2022, first achieving a silver medal in the mixed sprint relay with Charlotte Ward, Ralph Street and Kris Jones. She followed this up with a silver medal in the knock-out sprint, and finally a gold medal in the sprint final, breaking Tove Alexandersson's winning streak of 11 world championship victories in a row (Alexandersson finished in sixth place).

== Results ==
=== World Championship results ===
Year
Year	Long	Middle	Sprint	Relay	Sprint; Relay	Knock Out; Sprint
2017	—	—	28	7	—	—N/a
2018	—	20	28	DSQ	7	—N/a
2019	—	21	—N/a	9	—N/a	—N/a
2021	6	26	—	7	6	—N/a
2022	—N/a	—N/a	1	—N/a	2	2
2023	7	12	—N/a	8	—N/a	—N/a
