= Stock Hill =

Coordinates: 51°15′23″N 2°38′46″W

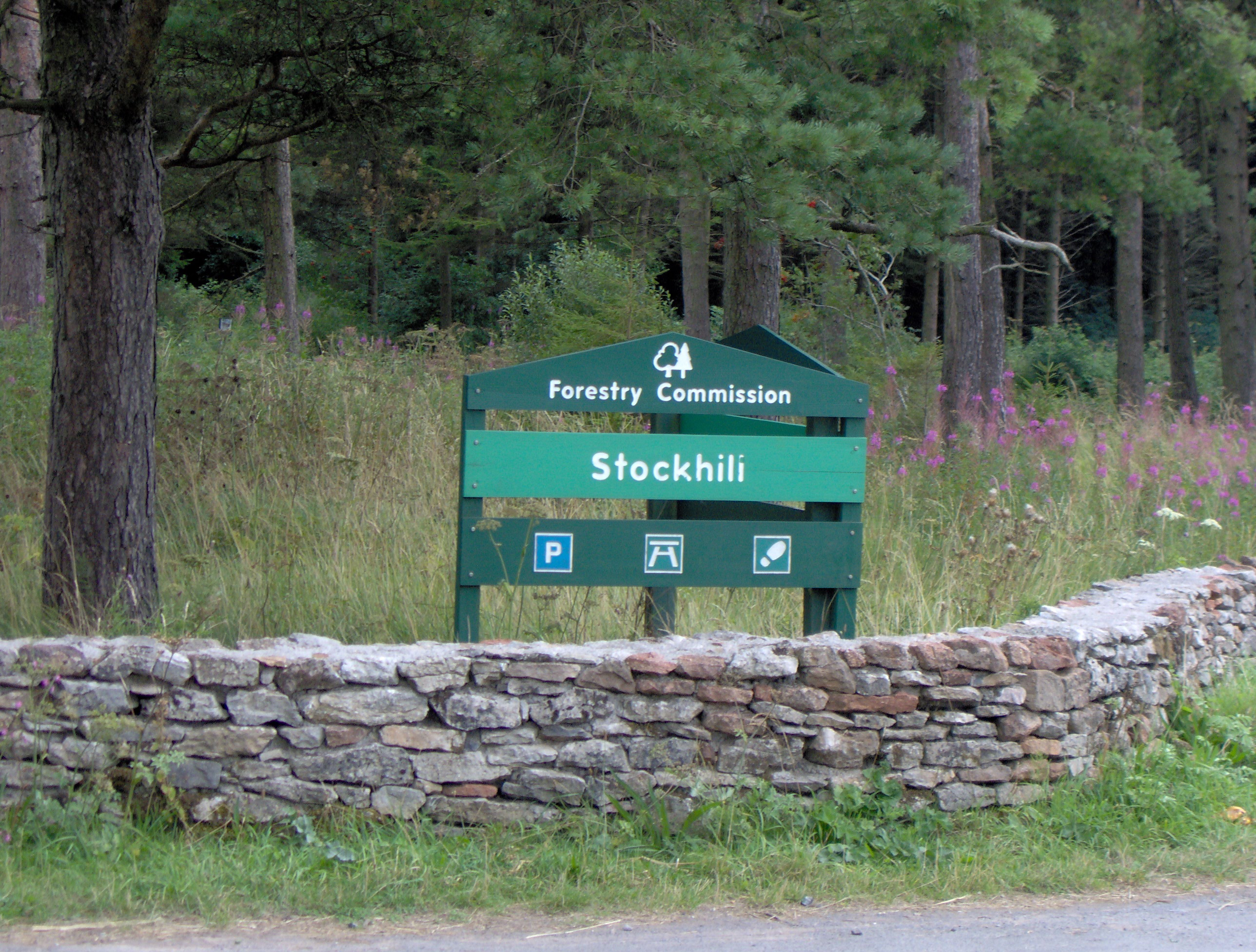
Stock Hill, Forestry Commission

Stock Hill (grid reference ST5551) is a Forestry Commission plantation on the Mendip Hills, Somerset, England.

It lies to the south of the B3135 which runs from Cheddar Gorge to Green Ore and is the largest woodland on the Mendip plateau. A number of wide rides run through the forest. In addition parts of the woodland are clear-felled, and in these areas a number of plant species associated with heathlands and acidic soils are present.

It is notable as a site for scarce birds, and as a result is popular with birdwatchers. It is one of the main breeding sites in northern Somerset for nightjars. In addition, long-eared owl nests here annually.

An "easy-going trail" has been constructed to enable access for people with mobility issues. The trail starts opposite the entrance to the car park and is made up of level compacted gravel. It is dedicated to Ian McArdle of the Cheddar Valley Access Group. He was a disabled man who loved Stockhill Forest and the Priddy Mineries opposite and inspired the trails creation.

Some of the trails form part of the national long distance footpath, the Monarch's Way.

Adjacent to the woodland on its western side (across a minor road) is Priddy Mineries, a nature reserve of the Somerset Wildlife Trust.
