= Scottish Orienteering Association =

Association for orienteering in Scotland

- Sport: Orienteering
- Abbreviation: SOA
- Affiliation: BOF

Official website
- www.scottish-orienteering.org
- (Scotland)

Scottish Orienteering Association (SOA), also known as Scottish Orienteering, is the association for Orienteering in Scotland and is a constituent association of the British Orienteering Federation. It is the Scottish Governing Body for the sport of Orienteering in Scotland.

== Governance and organisation ==
The SOA's governing body is composed of President Richard Oxlade and directors in seven areas. The seven areas are Development, Marketing & Communications, Operations, Performance, Partnerships, Secretary and Treasurer. All members of the governing body are volunteers. The volunteers are supported by salaried staff in the roles of Chief Operating Officer, Events Manager, Coaching & Volunteering Officer, an Admin Assistant and three Part-Time Regional Development Officers. Due to the high volunteer to paid staff ratio, much of the work such is undertaken by volunteers.

The Associations membership is roughly 1,400 who act as volunteers, organising and staging events. Of the members many also coach and are members of SOA affiliated local clubs of which there are 18 local and 4 university.

== Membership ==
The Associations membership is roughly 1,400.

=== Affiliated Scottish Clubs ===
==== Local clubs ====
These clubs are the Scottish clubs listed on the SOA's website.

Abbreviation	Full name
AYROC	Ayrshire Orienteering Club
BASOC	Badenoch & Strathspey Orienteering Club
CLYDE	Clydeside Orienteers
ECKO	Loch Eck Orienteers
ELO	East Lothian Orienteers
ESOC	Edinburgh Southern Orienteering Club
ESOA	East of Scotland Orienteering Association
FVO	Forth Valley Orienteers
GRAMP	Grampian Orienteers
INT	Interløpers
INVOC	Inverness Orienteering Club
KFO	Kingdom of Fife Orienteers
MAROC	Mar Orienteering Club
MOR	Moravian Orienteering Club
RR	Roxburgh Reivers Orienteering Club
SOLWAY	Solway Orienteers
STAG	St Andrew’s (Glasgow)
TAY	Tayside Orienteers
TINTO	Tinto Orienteering Club

==== University clubs ====
Abbreviation	Full name
AUOC - not affiliated to SOA/BOF as of November 2013	Aberdeen University Orienteering Club
EUOC	Edinburgh University Orienteering Club
GUOC - not affiliated to SOA/BOF as of November 2013.	Glasgow University Orienteering Club
StAUOC - not affiliated to SOA/BOF as of November 2013	St Andrews University Orienteering Club

==== Scottish Schools Orienteering Association ====
New Logo of the SSOA

There is a Scottish Schools Orienteering Association which is abbreviated to SSOA. The SSOA's main aims are to encourage schools to introduce orienteering to either the formal or informal curriculum and to organise an annual festival where these skills can be tested. This annual event, which took place on a Sunday, was until 1994 the Scottish Schools Orienteering Championships. The Annual Schools' Festival now runs on the first Friday of June and is called Scottish Schools Orienteering Festival(SSOF).In 2008 the SSOA held the World Schools' Championships in Edinburgh. The 2017 SSOF was held at Drumpellier Country Park, Coatbridge on Friday June 2.

The Organisation also has four major partners, Scottish Schools Sport Federation, International School Sport Federation, SOA and British Schools Orienteering Association.
