= Kyloe =

Coordinates: 55.6490°N 1.9300°W

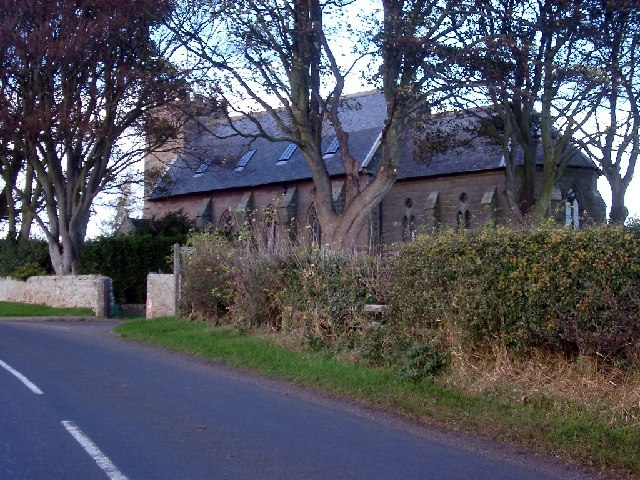
- Kyloe Church

- Location within Northumberland
- Population: 338 (2011 census)
- OS grid reference: NU045395
- Civil parish: Kyloe
- Unitary authority: Northumberland
- Shire county: Northumberland
- Region: North East
- Country: England
- Sovereign state: United Kingdom
- Post town: BERWICK UPON TWEED
- Postcode district: TD15
- Police: Northumbria
- Fire: Northumberland
- Ambulance: North East
- UK Parliament: North Northumberland

Kyloe is a civil parish in the county of Northumberland, about 8 miles (13 km) south-east of Berwick-upon-Tweed. According to the parish council, the main centres of population are Fenwick, Beal, and Berrington (in the western "panhandle" of the parish). In 2011 it had a population of 338.

The grade-II-listed former Church of St Nicholas in Kyloe was built in the 18th century, replacing a medieval building, and is now a private house.

At East Kyloe, the ruins of a late 14th- or early 15th-century medieval tower house known as Kyloe Tower now form part of a complex of farm buildings.

The nearby woodland area is a famous area for rock climbing and bouldering. Known locally as 'Kyloe-In-The-Woods' or simply 'The Woods', the crags are home to some of the toughest climbs in the UK.

== Notable people ==
- William Wilson Allen, VC (Rorke's Drift) was born at Kyloe in 1843
