= Philippa Whitehouse =

- Scientific career
- Fields: Glacial isostatic adjustment (GIA), ice sheet modeling, sea-level change
- Workplaces: Durham University

Philippa "Pippa" Whitehouse is a scientist from the United Kingdom predominantly studying how Antarctica is changing in response to climate change. More specifically, she researches Antarctic Ice Sheets, and how the continent's landscape changes in response to ice loss. She has done research and is an associate professor at Durham University, where she studied a variety of disciplines, including geophysics, atmospheric science, oceanography, and ecology. Her main focus is to understand the physical properties of Earth in relation to environmental concerns.

== Career and impact ==
Over her career, Whitehouse's research focused on the Antarctic Ice sheets, specifically their response to climate change using glacial isostatic adjustment (GIA) models. Whitehouse studies glacial growth, and ice sheet loss, as well as the geophysical properties of the south pole in relation to isostatic uplift from the removal of a mass of ice in an effort to better understand the continent and its geophysical properties. Dr. Whitehouse has done polar field research in Antarctica three times, working with both the US and the UK.

From 2013 to 2018, Whitehouse was a National Environmental Research Council (NERC) independent research fellow. NERC states their main goals to be to help researchers develop new skills, and advance their careers. The organization is based in the United Kingdom, but collaborates with researchers internationally.

Over the span of five years, Whitehouse analyzed changes in Earth's structure, specifically isostatic rebound and uplift due to ice loss using 3D modeling. She collaborated with many other Antarctic scientists, including Wouter van der Wal, Terry Wilson, Doug Wiens, Ed Bueler, and Matt King.

Whitehouse co-directed a scientific research program called SERCE (Solid Earth Response and influence on Cryosphere Evolution), where she worked with Matt King. The main goal of the SERCE scientific research program is to advance global isostatic adjustment models and understand the geophysics of Antarctica as a whole, while also training a new cohort of scientists.

She is also a proponent of inclusive workspaces, and the prevention of discrimination. In 2023, Dr. Whitehouse was highlighted by the British Antarctic Survey for her efforts in communication, acceptance, and freedom in the workplace.

In 2025, Whitehouse led the UKANET project which was funded by National Environmental Research Council (NERC). The project focused on studying Earth's rheology, and using GPS systems and seismic data to further understand Earth's structure. The project utilizes 28 stations located around the Weddell Sea and Antarctic Peninsula. Durham University works in partnership with Newcastle University, University of Leeds, and British Antarctic Survey.

== Awards and accomplishments ==
She was awarded the SCAR Medal for Excellence in 2022, particularly for her role in creating a new, continent wide Glacial Isostatic Adjustment model of Antarctica, and a reconstruction of the Antarctic Ice Sheet.

== Selected publications ==
- Lin, Y.; Whitehouse, P. L.; Hibbert, F. D.; Woodroffe, S. A.; Hinestrosa, G.; Webster, J. M. (2023). "Relative sea level response to mixed carbonate-siliciclastic sediment loading along the Great Barrier Reef margin". Earth and Planetary Science Letters. 607 118066. Bibcode:2023E&PSL.60718066L. doi:10.1016/j.epsl.2023.118066.
- Lin, Y.; Whitehouse, P. L.; Valentine, A. P.; Woodroffe, S. A. (2023). "GEORGIA: A Graph Neural Network Based EmulatOR for Glacial Isostatic Adjustment". Geophysical Research Letters. 50 (18). doi:10.1029/2023gl10367 (inactive 5 July 2026).
- Otosaka, I. N.; Shepherd, A.; Ivins, E. R.; Schlegel, N.-J.; Amory, C.; van den Broeke, M. R.; et al. (2023). "Mass balance of the Greenland and Antarctic ice sheets from 1992 to 2020". Earth System Science Data. 15 (4): 1597–1616. Bibcode:2023ESSD...15.1597O. doi:10.5194/essd-15-1597-2023.
- Whitehouse, P.; Bradley, S. (2013). "Eustatic sea-level changes since the Last Glacial Maximum". In Elias, S. (ed.). Encyclopedia of Quaternary Sciences (2nd ed.). Amsterdam: Elsevier. pp. 439–451.
