= British Orienteering Federation =

Governing body of orienteering in the UK

British Orienteering Federation Limited
- Sport: Orienteering
- Jurisdiction: United Kingdom
- Abbreviation: BOF
- Founded: 1967
- Affiliation: IOF
- Regional affiliation: Europe
- Location: United Kingdom
- President: Steve Cram
- Chairman: Rob Woods
- CEO: Peter Brooke

Official website
- www.britishorienteering.org.uk
- (United Kingdom)

The British Orienteering Federation Limited, generally known and branded as British Orienteering, is the national sports governing body for the sport of orienteering in the United Kingdom.

The federation was founded in June 1967, and is a member of the IOF.

== History ==
=== History of Orienteering in UK before the BOF ===
Orienteering was introduced to the UK in the 1950s and was heavily supported by renowned Olympians including John Disley and Chris Brasher. The early years were helped by orienteers from Sweden: in 1962 Baron 'Rak' Largerfelt of the Stockholm Orienteering Club came to Scotland to help develop the sport. This culminated in the first championship being held in May 1962 at Dunkeld, and the formation of the Scottish Orienteering Association.

Later visitors from Sweden included Jan Kjellström, a son of Silva compass founder Alvar Kjellström. Kjellström played an important role in the development of the sport and helped to accelerate developments in orienteering competition, mapping and coaching. Kjellström died in a road accident early in the year of 1967. 1967 saw the first Jan Kjellström International Festival of Orienteering or "JK", held in memory of Kjellström. Later that year the British Orienteering Federation was formed by the amalgamation of the English and Scottish Associations leading to the first British Orienteering Championships held at Hamsterley Forest.

=== After the Founding of BOF ===
With the growth of the sport BOF was founded in 1967, and continued to develop. There were 12 national and regional associations by 1972; the British Schools Orienteering Association joining in 1995 when it was formed to promote orienteering in schools. The Federation's membership had reached around 10,000 by 1998 and the club membership had increased to more 150 clubs.

== Structure ==
The federation is made up of thirteen constituent associations, one each for Scotland, Wales, and Northern Ireland; nine for the English regions; and the British Schools Orienteering Association. The nine English regions are also Members of the English Orienteering Council (EOC).

The associations are:

Abbreviation	Full name	Web address	Other notes
BSOA	British Schools Orienteering Association		
EAOA	East Anglian Orienteering Association		
EMOA	East Midlands Orienteering Association		
NEOA	North East Orienteering Association		
NIOA	Northern Ireland Orienteering Association		
NWOA	North West Orienteering Association		
SCOA	South Central Orienteering Association		
SEOA	South East Orienteering Association		
SOA	Scottish Orienteering Association		
SWOA	South West Orienteering Association		
WMOA	West Midlands Orienteering Association		
WOA	Welsh Orienteering Association		
YHOA	Yorkshire and Humberside Orienteering Association		

=== Funding ===
Funding is principally from three sources:

- Fees paid by individual members and clubs
- Event levies paid by events registered with British Orienteering.
- Grant funding from Sport England and Sport Northern Ireland.

Former grant funding from UK Sport has ceased, in common with many other non-Olympic sports.

== Governance ==
The British Orienteering Federation is governed by a board of directors, and through a number of steering groups appointed by the Board, covering:

- Coaching
- Development
- Events and Competitions
- Event Officials
- Event Scheduling
- Mapping
- Rules
- Performance
- Trail Orienteering
- Welfare and Safeguarding

The board of directors is chaired by Rob Woods. The chief executive is Peter Brooke. The board meets about four or five times a year.

== See also ==
- British orienteers
