= Jan Kjellström =

Swedish orienteer

- Born: 12 April 1940; Stockholm, Sweden
- Died: 12 January 1967 (aged 26); Sweden
- Known for: Orienteering

Jan Alvar Kjellström (12 April 1940 – 12 January 1967) was a Swedish orienteer who played an important role in the development of the sport of orienteering in Great Britain.

Kjellström was the son of Silva compass co-founder Alvar Estrid Petrus Kjellström and Ebon Hulda Anna Eugenia Kjellström. He was the nephew of Björn Kjellström.

He travelled to Great Britain to promote the sport of orienteering. There, he helped to accelerate developments in orienteering competition, mapping and coaching. Kjellström went back to Sweden, where he was killed in a car accident in January 1967.

== Jan Kjellström International Orienteering Festival ==
1967 saw the first Jan Kjellström International Orienteering Festival or "JK", held in memory of Kjellström. The annual JK moved to Easter in 1969, and now regularly attracts a field of four thousand or more. The 1974 JK was the first British event to attract more than one thousand entrants. It now attracts around 4000 people from the UK and abroad.

== See also ==
- British Orienteering Federation
- Björn Kjellström
