= Jamie Stevenson (orienteer) =

British orienteering champion (born 1975)

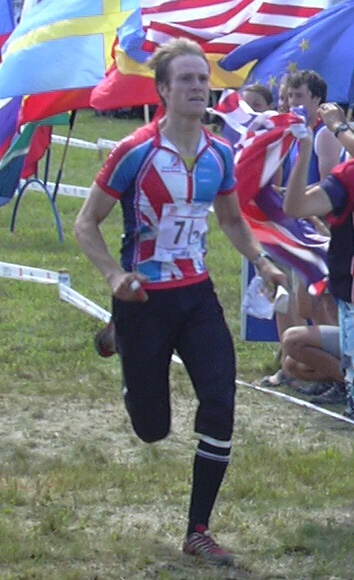
- Stevenson at the 2008 World Orienteering Championships

Personal information
- Nationality: Scottish
- Born: 25 March 1975 (age 51)

Sport
- Sport: Orienteering
Medal record
Men's orienteering
Representing Great Britain
World Championships
Gold medal – first place	2003 Rapperswil/Jona	Sprint
Gold medal – first place	2008 Olomouc	Relay
Bronze medal – third place	2003 Rapperswil/Jona	Relay
Bronze medal – third place	2006 Aarhus	Middle
World Games
Bronze medal – third place	2001 Akita	Short
European Championships
Silver medal – second place	2006 Otepää	Sprint
Bronze medal – third place	2002 Sümeg	Middle
Nordic Championships
Gold medal – first place	2001 Mikkeli	Relay
Silver medal – second place	2003 Flen	Sprint

Jamie Stevenson (born 25 March 1975) is a British orienteering champion. In 2003 he won the gold medal in the sprint distance at the World Orienteering Championships. He was the first and, to-date, the only British male orienteering world champion (Yvette Baker won the short distance race at the 1999 world championships).

Stevenson won a second individual world championship medal in Denmark in 2006, with a third place in the middle distance category.

He also holds two world relay medals running the anchor leg for Great Britain: Bronze in 2003 and Gold in 2008.

== Background ==
Stevenson was born on 25 March 1975 in Scotland. He was educated at Daniel Stewart's and Melville College in Edinburgh. He studied at the University of Sheffield.

== Orienteering ==
He has also raced for Swedish (IFK Göteborg) and Danish clubs. While living in Sweden he won the Swedish long distance championships. He now lives in Denmark. At international level he was a member of the British relay team which won the prestigious Nordic Championships in 2001, the relay bronze medal at the 2003 World Championships in Switzerland and the relay gold medal at the 2008 World Championships. In 2006 he won the Danish 4 km Short Course Cross Country Championships held in Helsingør.

In August 2002 Stevenson briefly topped the world orienteering rankings.

He appeared on the TV sports quiz They Think It's All Over in 2003 after winning the gold medal in the sprint distance at the World Orienteering Championships.

He also holds two world relay medals running the anchor leg for Great Britain in 2003 to take Bronze (with Dan Marsden and Jon Duncan) and Gold in 2008 with Graham Gristwood and Jon Duncan. Jamie Stevenson has won the British Orienteering Championships in all disciplines except for Night Orienteering.

== See also ==
- List of orienteers
- List of orienteering events
