= World University Orienteering Championships =

International orienteering competition

- Status: active
- Genre: sporting event
- Date: July–September
- Frequency: biannual
- Location: various
- Inaugurated: 1978
- Previous event: 2024
- Next event: 2026
- Organiser: FISU, IOF

The World University Orienteering Championships (WUOC) is a biannual orienteering competition organized by International University Sports Federation (FISU). Entry is open to athletes aged 17 to 25 who are enrolled in university either the year of or the year before the competition (ie. can compete in the year after they finish study). Representative countries must be members of the International Orienteering Federation (IOF).

== Format ==
The current championship events are:

- Relay – three-person teams (four-person teams until 2008)
- Long distance
- Middle distance
- Sprint
- Sprint Relay – four-person teams of two males and two females (added in 2014)

== Host towns/cities ==
| Year | Date | Place |
|---|---|---|
| 1978 | July 10 | Jyväskylä, Finland |
| 1980 | July 16 | St. Gallen, Switzerland |
| 1982 | August 10–15 | (Czech Republic) Česká Lípa, Czechoslovakia |
| 1984 | August 1–4 | Jönköping, Sweden |
| 1986 | August 1–3 | Miskolc, Hungary |
| 1988 | July 20–22 | Trondheim, Norway |
| 1990 | August 1–3 | Plavinas, Soviet Union |
| 1992 | July 26–31 | (United Kingdom) Aberdeen, Great Britain |
| 1994 | September 4–11 | Fiesch, Switzerland |
| 1996 | July 16–21 | Veszprém, Hungary |
| 1998 | August 10–15 | Trondheim, Norway |
| 2000 | August 25–September 2 | Roanne, France |
| 2002 | August 20–24 | Varna, Bulgaria |
| 2004 | June 21–27 | Plzeň, Czech Republic |
| 2006 | August 14–20 | Košice, Slovakia |
| 2008 | July 29 – August 2 | Tartu, Estonia |
| 2010 | July 17–24 | Borlänge, Sweden |
| 2012 | July 2–7 | Alicante, Spain |
| 2014 | August 12–16 | Olomouc, Czech Republic |
| 2016 | July 30 – August 4 | Miskolc, Hungary |
| 2018 | July 17–21 | Kuortane, Finland |
| 2022 | August 17–21 | Biel/Bienne, Switzerland |
| 2024 | August 1–5 | Bansko, Bulgaria |
| 2026 | July 28 — August 1 | Vila Real, Portugal |

== See also ==
- International University Sports Federation (FISU)
