= Hope Woodlands =

- Civil parish
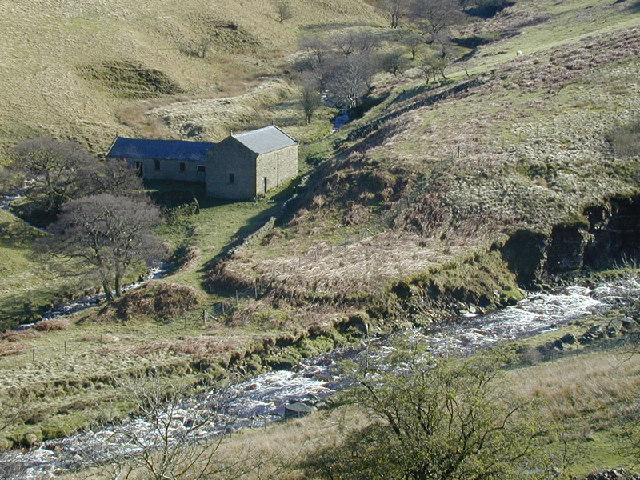
- Blackden Barn near the River Ashop

- Hope Woodlands highlighted within Derbyshire
- Interactive map of Hope Woodlands
- Coordinates: 53.40°N 1.79°W
- Country: England
- County: Derbyshire
- Region: East Midlands
- Status: Civil parish

Government
  - Type: Parish Council (jointly with Derwent)
  - UK Parliament: High Peak

Population (2021 census)
  - Total: 36

Hope Woodlands is an extensive civil parish in the High Peak district of Derbyshire in England.

The parish covers the Woodlands Valley, the western Upper Derwent Valley, the northern half of Kinder Scout and much of Bleaklow. The only habitations in the parish are remote farms, forming small clusters at Upper Ashop and Alport. According to the 2021 UK census, the parish had a population of 36 people.

Socialist and suffragette Hannah Mitchell was born here in 1872.

== See also ==
- Listed buildings in Hope Woodlands
