= Jon Duncan =

British orienteering competitor

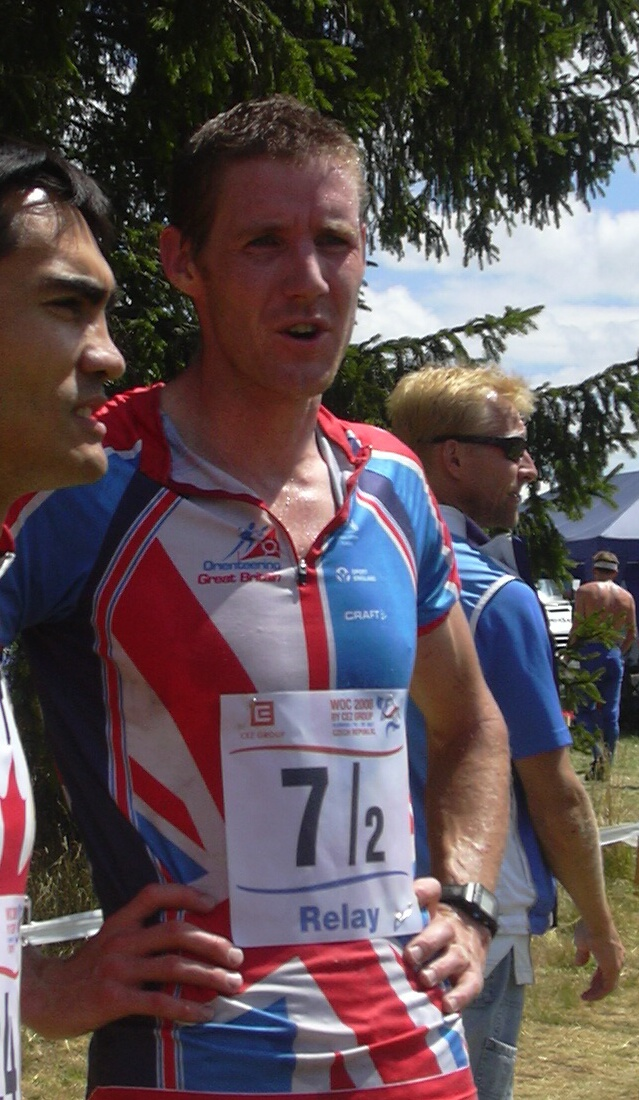
- Jon Duncan at WOC 2008

Medal record

Men's orienteering

Representing Great Britain

World Championships
Gold medal – first place	2008 Olomouc	Relay
Bronze medal – third place	2003 Rapperswil-Jona	Relay

Jon Duncan (born 6 October 1975) is a British orienteering competitor and world champion.

He received a gold medal in the relay event at the 2008 World Orienteering Championships in Olomouc, together with Graham Gristwood and Jamie Stevenson. He received a bronze medal in relay at the 2003 World Orienteering Championships in Rapperswil/Jona, together with Daniel Marston and Jamie Stevenson

He finished 5th in the world championship relay in 1999, and also 5th in 2004. In both 2000 and 2001 Duncan won the British long distance orienteering championships.

In 2009 he won the prestigious Jukola Relay with club Kristiansand OK.

== See also ==
- List of orienteers
- List of orienteering events
