= Yvette Baker =

British orienteer (born 1968)

Medal record

Women's orienteering

Representing Great Britain

World Championships
Gold medal – first place	1999 Inverness	Short
Silver medal – second place	1995 Detmold	Classic
Silver medal – second place	1995 Detmold	Short
Bronze medal – third place	1993 West Point	Classic

World Cup
Silver medal – second place	1994	WC Overall
Bronze medal – third place	1992	WC Overall

European Championships
Bronze medal – third place	2000 Truskavets	Classic
Bronze medal – third place	2000 Truskavets	Relay

Nordic Championships
Bronze medal – third place	1993 Sibbo	Long

Yvette Baker (born Yvette Hague, 1968) is Britain's most successful orienteer. At the 1999 World Orienteering Championships (WOC) in Inverness she won the short-distance event.

== Orienteering ==
Already at the early age of 15, she won the Elite class of the Jan Kjellstrom Trophy in 1983. The same year she was a member of the British relay team at the World Orienteering Championships, making her possibly the youngest WOC participant ever.

During the following years' WOC, she always had promising qualification results in the top 10, but could not match them in the finals. It was not until 1993, when she won Britain's first world championship medal coming third over the classic distance. In 1995, she won silver medals in the short and classic distances, again not matching her 1st place of the qualification. After another 1st place in the qualification of 1997, in 1999 she won the short-distance event to become World Orienteering Champion. In 2001, after a winning her fourth consecutive qualification (1995/97/99/2001), she retired from the WOC with an 11th place in the long-distance event. Between 1983 and 2001, she took part in all 11 WOC.

In domestic competition, she won both the British Orienteering Championships and the JK Orienteering Festival multiple times.

The annual Yvette Baker Trophy and Shield inter-club junior orienteering competition in the UK is named for her.

== Fell running ==
Baker represented England at mountain running and was a successful fell runner, winning races including the Edale Skyline, Duddon Valley, the Three Shires, the Langdale Horseshoe and the Carnethy 5.

== Personal life ==
She was born in the U.S. to British parents. She grew up in England and then lived for several years in Denmark before moving to New Zealand. She attended the University of Edinburgh and was a member of Edinburgh University Orienteering Club; she was inducted into the Edinburgh University Hall of Fame in 2011.

== See also ==
- British orienteers
- List of orienteers
- List of orienteering events
