= Stephen Palmer (orienteer) =

British orienteer

Medal record

Men's orienteering

Representing Great Britain

World Championships
Silver medal – second place	1993 West Point	Relay

Nordic Championships
Gold medal – first place	2001 Mikkeli	Relay

Stephen Palmer (born 1 March 1967) is a British orienteer. He ran the third leg in Britain's silver medal winning relay team at the 1993 World Orienteering Championships. Palmer was also a member of the British relay team that won the Nordic Championships in 2001.

Palmer also won the British Orienteering Championships in 1991 and 1999.

He now lives in Borlänge, Sweden.

== See also ==
- British orienteers
- List of orienteers
- List of orienteering events
