= Hamsterley Forest =

Forest in County Durham, England

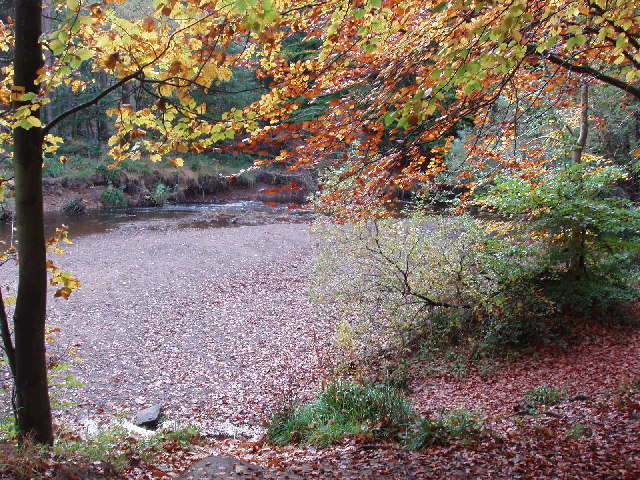
- Bedburn Beck in Autumn, Hamsterley Forest

- Location within County Durham

Geography
- Location: County Durham, England
- OS grid: NZ093307
- Coordinates: 54.672°N 1.856°W
- Area: 2,000 hectares (4,900 acres)

Administration
- Authority: Forestry England

Hamsterley Forest is a commercial forest in County Durham owned by the Crown and managed by Forestry England. It is the largest forest in County Durham and covers more than 2,000 hectares (4,900 acres). Recreational activities within the forest are focused at the eastern end, around the visitors' centre. In addition to the visitors' centre, there is a cafe, toilet facilities and cycling, walking and running trails.

== History ==
During the 1930s, the forest was planted and tracks were built by unemployed men supplied through the Ministry of Labour. Most came from the mining communities and shipyards of the North East of England. They were housed in one of a number of instructional centres created by the Ministry, most of them on Forestry England property. By 1938, the Ministry had 35 such centres across Britain. These were basically work camps, where unemployed men carried out heavy labour and lived on site in wooden huts. The centres were closed in 1938 as unemployment declined in the run-up to war, but some of the huts can still be seen around the visitors' centre, one of which was originally built as the camp's refectory. The visitors' centre was part of a prisoner of war camp during the Second World War.

A number of Mesolithic, Neolithic, and Bronze Age flint tools have been found in the forest in Doctor's Gate Quarry. An area of the forest is probably the site of a 15th century iron ore processing site. An area next to Linburn Hall Wood was the site of a medieval convent.

An episode of Time Team in 2008 examined a large stone structure known as "the Castles", with walls five metres thick. It appears to date from the late Iron Age and may have been an animal enclosure.
