= 2018 World Masters Orienteering Championships =

The World Masters Orienteering Championships 2018 was the 23rd World Masters Orienteering Championships(WMOC) organised and held in Denmark with 4200 participants from 45 countries. The WMOC is an annual international orienteering competition and the official world championship for orienteering runners above the age of 35. This is the largest orienteering event ever held on Danish soil. The champions were coming from 23 countries. The Danish organizers were using the WMOC as a promotional opportunity and arranged around the event several local competitions for the Danish public, which attracted participation in all ages.

== Sprint ==
The sprint competitions took place in Hørsholm north of Copenhagen (qualifications) and in central Copenhagen (finals). 25 champions were celebrated the first final day 8 July 2018.

MEN M35

Year	Gold	Silver	Bronze	Length and controls
2018	(Belgium) Tomas Hendrickx	(Russia) Roman Ryapolov	(Belarus) Dmitry Krapivko	3.9 km, 22 controls

WOMEN W35

Year	Gold	Silver	Bronze	Length and controls
2018	(Slovakia) Katarina Lamiova	(United States) Samantha Saeger	(Sweden) Emelie Eklof	3.3 km, 17 controls

MEN M40

Year	Gold	Silver	Bronze	Length and controls
2018	(Denmark) Rune Olsen	(Russia) Roman Efimov	(United Kingdom) Nick Barrable	3.7 km, 24 controls

WOMEN W40

Year	Gold	Silver	Bronze	Length and controls
2018	(Switzerland) Simone Niggli	(United Kingdom) Sarah Rollins	(Finland) Elli Virta	3.2 km, 18 controls

MEN M45

Year	Gold	Silver	Bronze	Length and controls
2018	(Denmark) Thomas Greve Jensen	(Sweden) Casper Giding	(Switzerland) Matthias Niggli	3.4 km, 23 controls

WOMEN W45

Year	Gold	Silver	Bronze	Length and controls
2018	(Australia) Natasha Key	(Estonia) Kirti Rebane	(Slovakia) Silvia Chupekova	3.1 km, 16 controls

MEN M50

Year	Gold	Silver	Bronze	Length and controls
2018	(Germany) Michael Finkenstaedt	(Poland) Piotr Cych	(Denmark) Jens Knud Maarup	3.3 km, 17 controls

WOMEN W50

Year	Gold	Silver	Bronze	Length and controls
2018	(Switzerland) Liselotte Freuler	(Finland) Sirra Toivonen	(Poland) Anna Gornicka Antonowicz	2.7 km, 17 controls

MEN M55

Year	Gold	Silver	Bronze	Length and controls
2018	(Switzerland) Lukas Jenzer	(United Kingdom) Graham Patten	(Finland) Pekka Kiljunen	3.0 km, 17 controls

WOMEN W55

Year	Gold	Silver	Bronze	Length and controls
2018	(Sweden) Laila Hoglund	(Czech Republic) Jana Smutna	(France) Veronique Guinot	2.6 km, 13 controls

MEN M60

Year	Gold	Silver	Bronze	Length and controls
2018	(United Kingdom) John Embrey	(United Kingdom) Keith Tonkin	(Lithuania) Ivanas Ziaziulia	3.1 km, 16 controls

WOMEN W60

Year	Gold	Silver	Bronze	Length and controls
2018	(New Zealand) Gillian Ingham	(Switzerland) Arlette Piguet	(Sweden) Katalin Karman	2.5 km, 12 controls

MEN M65

Year	Gold	Silver	Bronze	Length and controls
2018	(Norway) Sigurd Daehli	(Denmark) Keld Johnsen	(Finland) Mikko Sani	2.3 km, 13 controls

WOMEN W65

Year	Gold	Silver	Bronze	Length and controls
2018	(Norway) Unni Strand Karlsen	(Sweden) Maria Nordwall	(United Kingdom) Christine Kiddier	2.1 km, 12 controls

MEN M70

Year	Gold	Silver	Bronze	Length and controls
2018	(Denmark) Janne Brunstedt	(Belgium) Freddy Sillien	(Finland) Veikko Loukonen	2.3 km, 17 controls

WOMEN W70

Year	Gold	Silver	Bronze	Length and controls
2018	(Russia) Tamara Ovsiannikova	(Latvia) Mara Plaude	(United Kingdom) Sheila Carey	1.7 km, 13 controls

MEN M75

Year	Gold	Silver	Bronze	Length and controls
2018	(Germany) Helmut Conrad	(Sweden) Goran Andersson	(Denmark) Knud Soerensen (Finland) Timo Rapakko	1.9 km, 11 controls

WOMEN W75

Year	Gold	Silver	Bronze	Length and controls
2018	(Norway) Torid Kvaal	(Finland) Leena Paatero	(Germany) Erika Lemnitzer	1.5 km, 11 controls

MEN M80

Year	Gold	Silver	Bronze	Length and controls
2018	(Czech Republic) Alois Laznicka	(Norway) Jon Tyldum	(Sweden) Roland Karlsson	1.5 km, 11 controls

WOMEN W80

Year	Gold	Silver	Bronze	Length and controls
2018	(Denmark) Inge Madsen	(Estonia) Ilse Uus	(Sweden) Gunnel Borjesson	1.4 km, 10 controls

MEN M85

Year	Gold	Silver	Bronze	Length and controls
2018	(Switzerland) Martin Hutzli	(Sweden) Peo Bengtsson	(Japan) Atsushi Takahashi	1.4 km, 10 controls

WOMEN W85

Year	Gold	Silver	Bronze	Length and controls
2018	(Norway) Guldborg Sovik	(Sweden) Clarie Ek	(Sweden) Bernice Antonsson	1.1 km, 9 controls

MEN M90

Year	Gold	Silver	Bronze	Length and controls
2018	(Sweden) Karleric Fransso	(Australia) Hermann Wehner	(Sweden) Curth Svensson	1.1 km, 9 controls

WOMEN W90

Year	Gold	Silver	Bronze	Length and controls
2018	(Finland) Sole Nieminen	(Sweden) Signe Nyman		1.0 km, 11 controls

MEN M95

Year	Gold	Silver	Bronze	Length and controls
2018	(Finland) Unto Nyystila			1.0 km, 11 controls

== Middle distance ==
Middle Final took place in Tisvilde Hegn situated on the north coast of the island Zealand. Famous from numerous big events throughout the history, Tisvilde Hegn is legendary in Danish Orienteering for its special vegetation and characteristic contour features. 24 champions were celebrated the second final day 11 July 2018.

MEN M35

Year	Gold	Silver	Bronze	Length and controls
2018	(Russia) Roman Ryapolov	(Belarus) Pavel Krasko	(Slovakia) Ondrej Pijak	5.9 km, 24 controls

WOMEN W35

Year	Gold	Silver	Bronze	Length and controls
2018	(Sweden) Emelie Eklof	(Sweden) Rebecka Lindberg	(Sweden) Maria Andersson	4.7 km, 19 controls

MEN M40

Year	Gold	Silver	Bronze	Length and controls
2018	(Sweden) Jakob Eng	(Finland) Petteri Muukkonen	(United Kingdom) Nick Barrable	5.8 km, 24 controls

WOMEN W40

Year	Gold	Silver	Bronze	Length and controls
2018	(Switzerland) Simone Niggli	(Finland) Elli Virta	(Sweden) Anna Quayle	4.6 km, 19 controls

MEN M45

Year	Gold	Silver	Bronze	Length and controls
2018	(Sweden) Casper Giding	(Denmark) Thomas Greve Jensen	(Switzerland) Matthias Niggli	4.9 km, 20 controls

WOMEN W45

Year	Gold	Silver	Bronze	Length and controls
2018	(Estonia) Kirti Rebane	(Denmark) Tenna Norgaard Landsperg	(Finland) Heidi Salonen	3.9 km, 19 controls

MEN M50

Year	Gold	Silver	Bronze	Length and controls
2018	(Norway) Christian Vogelsang	(Denmark) Jens Knud Maarup	(Finland) Risto Haikonen	4.6 km, 20 controls

WOMEN W50

Year	Gold	Silver	Bronze	Length and controls
2018	(Finland) Sirra Toivonen	(Finland) Annika Viilo	(Denmark) Marianne Lynge Krogh	3.8 km, 17 controls

MEN M55

Year	Gold	Silver	Bronze	Length and controls
2018	(Sweden) Håkan Eriksson	(Czech Republic) Petr Henych	(Norway) Anton Bjartnes	4.4 km, 20 controls

WOMEN W55

Year	Gold	Silver	Bronze	Length and controls
2018	(Sweden) Sara Snogerup Linse	(Sweden) Laila Hoglund	(Finland) Anne Nurmi	3.6 km, 17 controls

MEN M60

Year	Gold	Silver	Bronze	Length and controls
2018	(Denmark) Rolf Lund	(Sweden) Per Magnusson	(Sweden) Sixten Westlund	4.3 km, 18 controls

WOMEN W60

Year	Gold	Silver	Bronze	Length and controls
2018	(Russia) Viktoriia Fershalova	(Finland) Anne Pelto Huikko	(Norway) Grete S Borge Hovi	3.5 km, 16 controls

MEN M65

Year	Gold	Silver	Bronze	Length and controls
2018	(Norway) Sigurd Daehli	(Norway) Tom Arild Karlsen	(Sweden) Olof Olofsson	3.8 km, 18 controls

WOMEN W65

Year	Gold	Silver	Bronze	Length and controls
2018	(Norway) Unni Strand Karlsen	(Sweden) Eva Tykesson	(Finland) Pirkko Kalliola	3.3 km, 15 controls

MEN M70

Year	Gold	Silver	Bronze	Length and controls
2018	(Belgium) Freddy Sillien	(Finland) Pertti Nieminen	(Norway) Kjell Winther	3.7 km, 18 controls

WOMEN W70

Year	Gold	Silver	Bronze	Length and controls
2018	(Sweden) Karin Gustafsson	(United States) Sharon Crawford	(Finland) Eeva Liisa Korkeakangas	3.0 km, 15 controls

MEN M75

Year	Gold	Silver	Bronze	Length and controls
2018	(Finland) Juhani Makinen	(Germany) Helmut Conrad	(Switzerland) Ernst Odermatt	3.2 km, 15 controls

WOMEN W75

Year	Gold	Silver	Bronze	Length and controls
2018	(Norway) Torid Kvaal	(Sweden) Gudrun Broman	(Sweden) Britt Rangert	2.4 km, 14 controls

MEN M80

Year	Gold	Silver	Bronze	Length and controls
2018	(Sweden) Roland Karlsson	(Denmark) Jørgen Jensen	(Finland) Tapio Patana	2.8 km, 15 controls

WOMEN W80

Year	Gold	Silver	Bronze	Length and controls
2018	(Sweden) Asta Sjoeberg	(Estonia) Ilse Uus	(Sweden) Eivor Steen Olsson	1.6 km, 9 controls

MEN M85

Year	Gold	Silver	Bronze	Length and controls
2018	(Sweden) Peo Bengtsson	(Switzerland) Martin Hutzli	(Sweden) Arvo Hyvonen	1.8 km, 10 controls

WOMEN W85

Year	Gold	Silver	Bronze	Length and controls
2018	(Sweden) Clarie Ek	(Switzerland) Verena Harzenmoser	(Sweden) Aasa Nilsson	1.4 km, 8 controls

MEN M90

Year	Gold	Silver	Bronze	Length and controls
2018	(Sweden) Karleric Fransso	(Finland) Arvo Majoinen	(Sweden) Curth Svensson	1.6 km, 10 controls

WOMEN W90

Year	Gold	Silver	Bronze	Length and controls
2018	(Sweden) Signe Nyman	(Finland) Sole Nieminen		1.1 km, 7 controls

== Long distance ==
The long distance final took place in the classic Grib forest, which is one of the largest in Denmark. The terrain is typical for eastern Denmark and yet challenging due to its complex varieties of vegetation – from thick spruce forest to hilly, yet fast old beech forest areas. Despite the fact that wood cutting has been extensive over the previous years, large areas of old spruce still provides for fast running. 24 champions were celebrated the third final day 13 July 2018.

MEN M35

Year	Gold	Silver	Bronze	Length and controls
2018	(Russia) Roman Ryapolov	(Slovakia) Ondrej Pijak	(Ukraine) Vladyslav Laskarzhevsky	13.5 km, 31 controls

WOMEN W35

Year	Gold	Silver	Bronze	Length and controls
2018	(Sweden) Rebecka Lindberg	(Sweden) Emelie Eklof	(Finland) Tiina Vaere	8.2 km, 19 controls

MEN M40

Year	Gold	Silver	Bronze	Length and controls
2018	(Finland) Petteri Muukkonen	(United Kingdom) Nick Barrable	(Sweden) Jakob Eng	12.0 km, 25 controls

WOMEN W40

Year	Gold	Silver	Bronze	Length and controls
2018	(Switzerland) Simone Niggli	(Latvia) Irita Pukite	(Finland) Elli Virta	7.2 km, 21 controls

MEN M45

Year	Gold	Silver	Bronze	Length and controls
2018	(Sweden) Casper Giding	(Finland) Manu Mutka	(Sweden) Tommy Lindberg	10.3 km, 21 controls

WOMEN W45

Year	Gold	Silver	Bronze	Length and controls
2018	(Estonia) Kirti Rebane	(Germany) Hanka Straube	(Sweden) Charlotte Flansbjer	6.3 km, 16 controls

MEN M50

Year	Gold	Silver	Bronze	Length and controls
2018	(Denmark) Jens Knud Maarup	(Norway) Christian Vogelsang	(Germany) Nils Schmiedeberg	9.4 km, 20 controls

WOMEN W50

Year	Gold	Silver	Bronze	Length and controls
2018	(Poland) Anna Gornicka Antonowicz	(Finland) Annika Viilo	(France) Marie Morlon	6.1 km, 14 controls

MEN M55

Year	Gold	Silver	Bronze	Length and controls
2018	(Sweden) Håkan Eriksson	(Czech Republic) Petr Henych	(Denmark) Kent Kragh	8.1 km, 18 controls

WOMEN W55

Year	Gold	Silver	Bronze	Length and controls
2018	(Sweden) Sara Snogerup Linse	(Sweden) Laila Hoglund	(Czech Republic) Jana Smutna	5.9 km, 15 controls

MEN M60

Year	Gold	Silver	Bronze	Length and controls
2018	(Sweden) Sixten Westlund	(Denmark) Rolf Lund	(Finland) Eero Junkala	7.7 km, 20 controls

WOMEN W60

Year	Gold	Silver	Bronze	Length and controls
2018	(Germany) Veronika Lange	(Lithuania) Danute Vilkeliene	(Sweden) Katalin Karman	6.0 km, 16 controls

MEN M65

Year	Gold	Silver	Bronze	Length and controls
2018	(Norway) Sigurd Daehli	(Ukraine) Mykola Bozhko	(Sweden) Ken Ragnarsson	7.1 km, 18 controls

WOMEN W65

Year	Gold	Silver	Bronze	Length and controls
2018	(Sweden) IngMarie Aasenlund	(Sweden) Christina Hjertson	(United Kingdom) Christine Kiddier	5.2 km, 14 controls

MEN M70

Year	Gold	Silver	Bronze	Length and controls
2018	(Belgium) Freddy Sillien	(Finland) Veikko Loukonen	(Sweden) Christer Sandh	6.6 km, 19 controls

WOMEN W70

Year	Gold	Silver	Bronze	Length and controls
2018	(Sweden) Karin Gustafsson	(Norway) Kari Timenes Laugen	(Russia) Tamara Ovsiannikova	5.0 km, 15 controls

MEN M75

Year	Gold	Silver	Bronze	Length and controls
2018	(Germany) Helmut Conrad	(Finland) Reijo Haaja	(Norway) Helge Bjaaland	5.8 km, 15 controls

WOMEN W75

Year	Gold	Silver	Bronze	Length and controls
2018	(Sweden) Birgitta Olsson	(Sweden) Helen Andertoft	(Norway) Torid Kvaal	4.2 km, 13 controls

MEN M80

Year	Gold	Silver	Bronze	Length and controls
2018	(Sweden) Roland Karlsson	(Russia) Jurii Grishanov	(Sweden) Rune Carlsson	5.0 km, 14 controls

WOMEN W80

Year	Gold	Silver	Bronze	Length and controls
2018	(Sweden) Asta Sjoeberg	(Sweden) Eivor Steen Olsson	(Denmark) Inge Madsen	2.7 km, 10 controls

MEN M85

Year	Gold	Silver	Bronze	Length and controls
2018	(Sweden) Peo Bengtsson	(Sweden) Goran Larsson	(Switzerland) Martin Hutzli	3.2 km, 15 controls

WOMEN W85

Year	Gold	Silver	Bronze	Length and controls
2018	(Sweden) Bernice Antonsson	(Sweden) Clarie Ek	(Norway) Guldborg Sovik	2.3 km, 9 controls

MEN M90

Year	Gold	Silver	Bronze	Length and controls
2018	(Sweden) Karleric Fransso	(Finland) Arvo Majoinen	(Norway) Brynjulf Forseth	2.9 km, 13 controls

WOMEN W90

Year	Gold	Silver	Bronze	Length and controls
2018	(Sweden) Signe Nyman	(Finland) Sole Nieminen		1.9 km, 9 controls
