= O-Ringen =

Annual orienteering competition in Sweden

- Genre: Sporting event
- Frequency: Annually
- Location: Sweden
- Inaugurated: 1965; 61 years ago
- Website: www.oringen.se/en/start.html
- O-Ringen 2025

The O-Ringen is an orienteering competition based in Sweden. It takes place annually in different parts of the country. Orienteers from all over the world come to the event. The competition attracts significant media coverage and winning is often considered second only to the World Orienteering Championships in prestige.

The competition takes place in the month of July, and takes place over 5 days, where every active day is a competition stage. Competitors are assigned start times for the first four stages of the race, but on the fifth and final stage a "chasing start" is used. In a chasing start the overall leader in each class starts first and the remaining competitors start according to the total time they trail. This means that the first runner over the finish line on the final stage is the winner.

== History ==
In 1965, the O-Ringen was first started in Denmark, Scania, and Blekinge by elite Swedish national team runners Peo Bengtsson and Sivar Nordström. They organised the competition at short notice from 19–23 July to fill the days between two already-organised weekend events in Simlångsdalen and Kallinge. Due to lack of available high-quality maps, the first day was organised in Hillerød. After being publicised in the Skogssport and the Idrottsbladet magazines, 156 participants attended the first event, during which guest of honour Torsten Tegnér was forced to help with organisation due to lack of volunteers. The events were organised in the evenings to allow for people who had to work during the day. Following the first event, participation levels then steadily increased.

The O-Ringen received its name from the union of Swedish national team runners that Bengtsson and Nordström were first part of; the union was started with the purpose to improve international orienteering in 1962 by ten Swedish national team runners, including most Swedish competitors at the 1962 European Orienteering Championships. Some of the first members included European Championships medallists Bertil Norman and Emy Gauffin. The O-Ringen union was important in organising the event through to 1978, and held some administrative roles until 2003.

Up until today the highest participant level was in 1985 in Dalarna/Falun were there were 25,021 participants.

The O-Ringen was included in the Orienteering World Cup series in 1998, 2007, and 2008.

In 2009 there were prize money in the Elite series, the main classes for both the men and the women, totalling to half a million kronor. The final result in the junior elite classes will count towards the Silva Junior Cup.

From 2008, multi-sport has been represented at the competition in the form of the O-Ringen Multi. The competition on the Tuesday will be a part of the Swedish Multi-sport Cup.

The O-Ringen Academy is a training program which consists of three sections; International, Leadership and Sports. The International section focuses on training orienteers from all over the world who want to learn more about orienteering in order to develop the sport in their home countries. The Leadership section is a leadership training course in the form of seminars and speeches. The Sports section is more concerned with the physical side with training camps of different sorts, including a week for juniors before the O-Ringen.

== Records ==
- The first ever stage of the Swedish 5-Days was held in Denmark.
- Ulla Lindkvist has the most titles in the women's class with eight wins.
- Lars Lönnkvist has won the men's class four times

== Statistics ==
Year	Location	Contestants	Women's winner	Men's winner
1965	Scania, Blekinge, Denmark	156	(Sweden) Inga-Britt Bengtsson	(Sweden) Nils Bohman
1966	Småland, Västergötland	672	(Sweden) Kerstin Granstedt	(Finland) Juhani Salmenkylä
1967	Motala	1,910	(Sweden) Ulla Lindkvist	(Sweden) Kalle Johansson
1968	Borås	3,250	(Sweden) Ulla Lindkvist	(Norway) Åge Hadler
1969	Rommehed	5,355	(Sweden) Ulla Lindkvist	(Sweden) Stefan Green
1970	Kristianstad	6,378	(Sweden) Ulla Lindkvist	(Sweden) Bernt Frilén
1971	Malmköping	8,627	(Sweden) Ulla Lindkvist	(Sweden) Hans Aurell
1972	Eksjö	8,253	(Sweden) Ulla Lindkvist	(Sweden) Hans Aurell
1973	Rättvik	10,449	(Sweden) Ulla Lindkvist	(Sweden) Bengt Gustafsson
1974	Kristianstad	10,196	(Sweden) Ulla Lindkvist	(Sweden) Ernst Jönsson
1975	Haninge	9,322	(Sweden) Anne Lundmark	(Finland) Matti Mäkinen
1976	Ransäter	14,843	(Hungary) Sarolta Monspart	(Sweden) Gert Pettersson
1977	Visby	7,186	(Finland) Liisa Veijalainen	(Norway) Sigurd Dæhli
1978	Skara	15,148	(Finland) Liisa Veijalainen	(Sweden) Kjell Lauri
1979	Örebro	15,842	(Sweden) Britt-Marie Karlsson	(Sweden) Lars-Henrik Undeland
1980	Uppsala	15,142	(Finland) Liisa Veijalainen	(Sweden) Lars Lönnkvist
1981	Mohed	18,983	(Sweden) Annichen Kringstad	(Sweden) Jörgen Mårtensson
1982	Luleå	13,631	(Sweden) Annichen Kringstad	(Sweden) Lars Lönnkvist
1983	Anderstorp	22,498	(Sweden) Annichen Kringstad	(Sweden) Håkan Eriksson
1984	Bräkne-Hoby	16,123	(Sweden) Karin Gunnarsson	(Sweden) Kent Olsson
1985	Falun	25,021	(Sweden) Annichen Kringstad	(Sweden) Joakim Ingelsson
1986	Borås	17,353	(Sweden) Annichen Kringstad	(Sweden) Anders Erik Olsson
1987	Norrköping	16,216	(Sweden) Katarina Borg	(Sweden) Lars Lönnkvist
1988	Sundsvall	16,413	(Sweden) Barbro Lönnkvist	(Sweden) Lars Lönnkvist
1989	Östersund	17,818	(Sweden) Barbro Lönnkvist	(Sweden) Niklas Löwegren
1990	Gothenburg	20,172	(Norway) Ragnhild Bente Andersen	(Sweden) Per Ek
1991	Arboga	16,581	(Sweden) Arja Hannus	(Sweden) Håkan Eriksson
1992	Södertälje	17,806	(Sweden) Gunilla Svärd	(Denmark) Allan Mogensen
1993	Falkenberg	15,006	(Sweden) Annika Zell	(Norway) Petter Thoresen
1994	Örnsköldsvik	14,414	(Sweden) Katarina Borg	(Norway) Petter Thoresen
1995	Hässleholm	14,304	(Finland) Eija Koskivaara	(Sweden) Jörgen Olsson
1996	Karlstad	17,007	(Sweden) Annika Zell	(Sweden) Jörgen Mårtensson
1997	Umeå	11,179	(Sweden) Katarina Borg	(Sweden) Jörgen Mårtensson
1998	Gävle	13,249	(Norway) Hanne Staff	(Sweden) Johan Ivarsson
1999	Borlänge	15,238	(Sweden) Jenny Johansson	(Sweden) Fredrik Löwegren
2000	Hallsberg	13,740	(Norway) Hanne Staff	(Sweden) Jimmy Birklin
2001	Märsta	12,525	(Sweden) Marlena Jansson	(Sweden) Johan Ivarsson
2002	Skövde	14,651	(Switzerland) Simone Niggli-Luder	(Finland) Mats Haldin
2003	Uddevalla	14,998	(United Kingdom) Heather Monro	(Finland) Mats Haldin
2004	Gothenburg	13,259	(Sweden) Jenny Johansson	(Russia) Valentin Novikov
2005	Skillingaryd	12,657	(Sweden) Emma Engstrand	(Sweden) Emil Wingstedt
2006	Mohed	13,500	(Switzerland) Simone Niggli-Luder	(Lithuania) Simonas Krepsta
2007	Mjölby	14,300	(Switzerland) Simone Niggli-Luder	(Norway) Anders Nordberg
2008	Sälen	24,375	(Norway) Anne Margrethe Hausken	(Finland) Tero Föhr
2009	Eksjö	15,589	(Sweden) Helena Jansson	(Sweden) Martin Johansson
2010	Örebro	16,069	(Switzerland) Simone Niggli-Luder	(Sweden) David Andersson
2011	Mohed	12,939	(Sweden) Tove Alexandersson	(Sweden) Erik Rost
2012	Halmstad	21,172	(Russia) Tatiana Ryabkina	(Norway) Olav Lundanes
2013	Boden	12,907	(Sweden) Tove Alexandersson	(France) Thierry Gueorgiou
2014	Kristianstad	23,088	(Sweden) Tove Alexandersson	(France) Thierry Gueorgiou
2015	Borås	18,058	(Norway) Anne Margrethe Hausken	(Sweden) William Lind
2016	Sälen	24,313	(Sweden) Tove Alexandersson	(France) Thierry Gueorgiou
2017	Arvika	15,127	(Sweden) Tove Alexandersson	(Sweden) William Lind
2018	Örnsköldsvik	17,171	(Switzerland) Simone Niggli-Luder	(Norway) Magne Daehli
2019	Norrköping	21,171	(Sweden) Tove Alexandersson	(Ukraine) Ruslan Glebov
2020	Cancelled due to the COVID-19 pandemic			
2021	Cancelled due to the COVID-19 pandemic			
2022	Uppsala	20,271	(Sweden) Sara Hagström	(Sweden) Gustav Bergman
2023	Åre	15,657	(Sweden) Sara Hagström	(Finland) Olli Ojanaho
2024	Oskarshamn	19,304	(Sweden) Tove Alexandersson	(Sweden) Emil Svensk
2025	Jönköping	16,863	(Switzerland) Simona Aebersold	(Sweden) Emil Svensk
2026	Gothenburg	21 161	(Switzerland) Simona Aebersold	(Sweden) Viktor Svensk
2027	Stockholm	TBA	TBA	TBA
2028	Sundsvall	TBA	TBA	TBA
2029	Borlänge	TBA	TBA	TBA

== See also ==
- Tiomila
- Jukola relay
- List of sporting events in Sweden
