= Finn Kinneberg =

Norwegian orienteer

Medal record

Representing Norway

Men's ski orienteering

World Championships
Silver medal – second place	1982 Aigen im Ennstal	Relay
Bronze medal – third place	1984 Lavarone	Relay

Finn Kinneberg is a Norwegian ski-orienteering competitor. He won a silver medal in the relay at the World Ski Orienteering Championships in Aigen im Ennstal in 1982, together with Tore Sagvolden, Morten Berglia and Sigurd Dæhli. He won a bronze medal in the relay at the 1984 World Championships.
