= Harald Thon =

Norwegian orienteer (1954–2019)

Personal information
- Born: 1954
- Died: 28 December 2019 (aged 64–65)
- Relatives: Øyvin Thon (brother)

Sport
- Sport: Orienteering
- Club: IF Sturla
Medal record
Men's orienteering
Representing Norway
World Championships
Gold medal – first place	1981 Thun	Relay
Gold medal – first place	1983 Zalaegerszeg	Relay

Harald Thon (1954 – 28 December 2019) was a Norwegian orienteering competitor who represented the club IF Sturla and the Norwegian national team. He was part of the Norwegian winning team in relay at the World Orienteering Championships in 1981 and 1983.

== Career ==
Thon became Norwegian orienteering champion in relay with IF Sturla seven years in a row, in 1979, 1980, 1981, 1982, 1983, 1984, and 1985. He became Norwegian champion in the long distance in 1979 (course length 23.3 kilometers, 22 controls), and again in 1980 (course length 27.0 kilometers, 25 controls). He was awarded Bjarne Bjerckes pokal for his results in the long distance national championships. He won an individual silver medal in the Norwegian championships in 1982 (course length 12.1 kilometers), behind Egil Iversen, and an individual bronze medal in 1983 (course length 13.3 kilometers).

Thon competed at the 1981 World Orienteering Championships in Thun, Switzerland, where he placed 10th in the individual competition, and won a gold medal in the relay event, together with Øyvin Thon, Tore Sagvolden and Sigurd Dæhli. At the 1983 World Orienteering Championships in Zalaegerszeg, Hungary, he won his second world championship relay, together with Morten Berglia, Øyvin Thon and Tore Sagvolden. Thon was running the last (fourth) leg, and started 1.17 minutes behind leading Switzerland. He passed the leader when the Swiss runner had a miss at the tenth control, and won the relay with a margin of one and a half minute ahead of the Czechoslovak team.

Harald Thon died in 2019, on 28 December. He was an older brother of Øyvin Thon, a seven-times world champion in orienteering.
