= Atle Hansen =

Norwegian orienteer

Medal record

Men's orienteering

Representing Norway

World Championships
Gold medal – first place	1985 Bendigo	Relay

Atle Hansen is a Norwegian orienteering competitor and world champion. He won a gold medal in the relay event at the 1985 World Orienteering Championships in Bendigo, together with Morten Berglia, Tore Sagvolden and Øyvin Thon. He finished overall second in the first unofficial World Cup in 1983. He was national junior champion in the individual event in 1980 and again in 1981, and received a silver medal in the individual event at the Nordic Orienteering Championships for juniors in Borlänge in 1980. He won the Jukola relay in 1986.
