= 1971 Söderhamn courthouse murders =

Mass shooting in Sweden

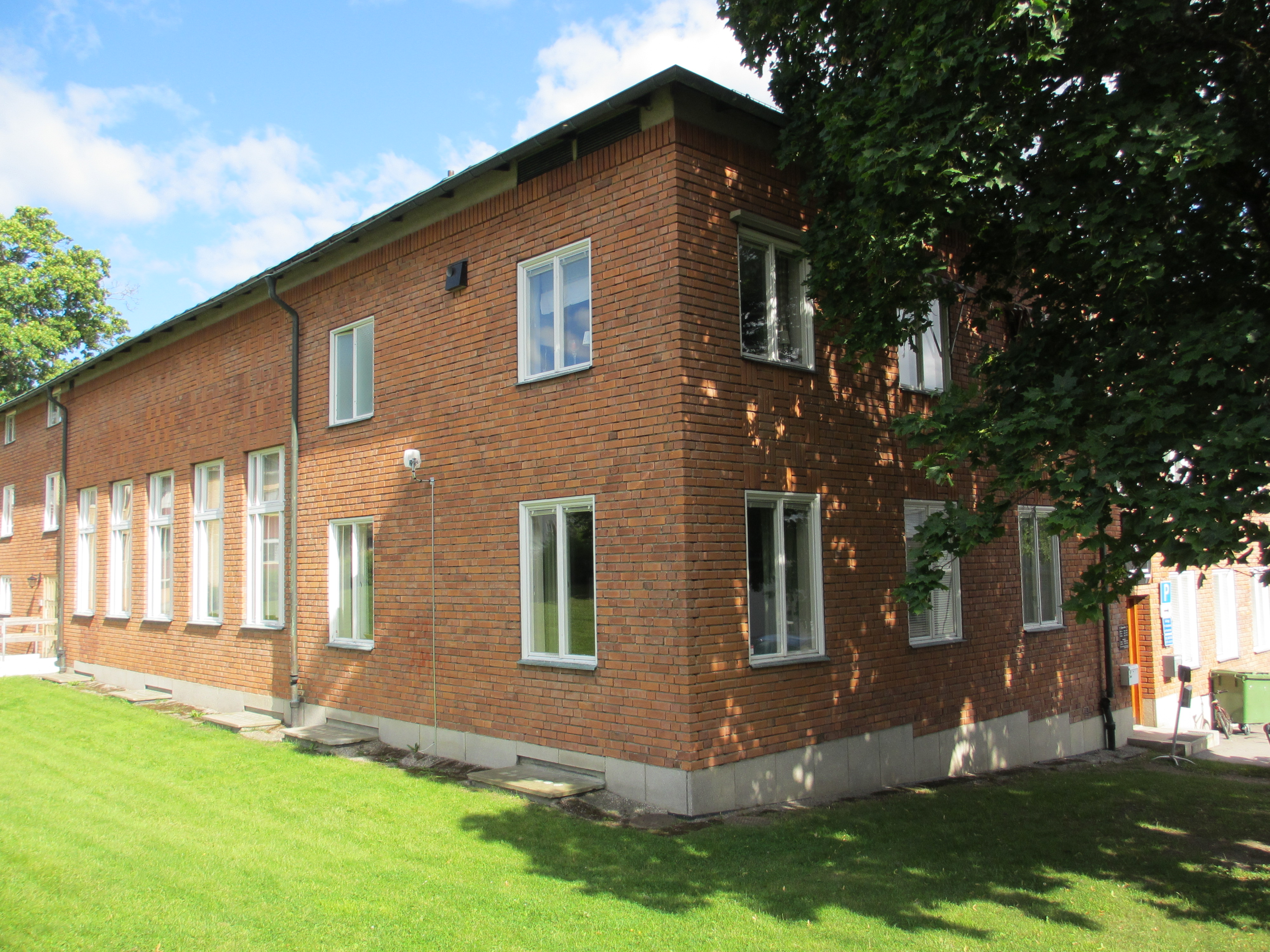
- The murders were committed on the first floor of this part of the courthouse in Söderhamn.

- Söderhamn (Sweden Gävleborg) Söderhamn (Sweden)
- Location: 61°18′19″N 17°03′28″E; Västra Parkgatan 2, Söderhamn, Sweden
- Date: 1 March 1971 (CET)
- Target: Ex-girlfriend, lawyers
- Attack type: Shooting
- Weapon: Pistol
- Deaths: 4
- Victim: 4
- Perpetrator: Gunnar Bengtsson
- Verdict: Guilty
- Convictions: Murder (4 counts)
- Sentence: Institutional psychiatric care

The 1971 Söderhamn courthouse murders (Swedish: Tingshusmorden) was a mass killing in Sweden when a 61-year-old homeowner on 1 March 1971 shot and killed four people during a preliminary hearing in a civil case in the Southeastern Hälsingland courthouse in Söderhamn. The shooting was the epilogue to a five-year-old lawsuit. Homeowner Gunnar Bengtsson had fallen in love with a woman who also moved in with him. The couple got engaged at the end of 1965, but when there was talk of marriage, the woman pulled out. Bengtsson had lent money to the woman without a receipt, as they intended to marry. When Bengtsson began to suspect trouble, he took jewelry as security for the money he lent her. Both the assize court, the court of appeal and the supreme court sentenced him to return the jewelry and pay the woman's legal costs. During the division of property Bengtsson killed the woman, her lawyer, his lawyer and a lawspeaker.

== Background ==
Homeowner Gunnar Bengtsson (1909–1993) had met Cecilia Ekestang on 11 or 12 July 1965, when he was conducting haymaking. She had then told him that she was a speculator on a neighboring farm on the other side of the valley. Bengtsson and Ekestang agreed to meet the following day. Even then they were talking about marriage. Ekestand bought the neighboring farm, but she didn't get an acquisition permit. Since Bengtsson and Ekestang were going to get married anyway, Bengtsson stepped in, posed as the buyer and got the title.

The couple got engaged. The banns were issued on 20 November 1965, and the wedding day was decided. Disagreement between the two arose. They moved apart, and at the same time started arguing about who actually paid for the neighboring farm. Bengtsson claimed that it was bought with his money. Ekestrand stated that it was her money that was used. A few months later, Ekestrand sued her ex-fiancé.

The assize court of Söderhamn sentenced Bengtsson to pay the woman SEK 11,600 and return the jewelry, then valued at SEK 4,000. The court of appeal reduced the compensation amount to SEK 3,950 and rejected the request for the return of the jewelry. The Supreme Court sentenced Bengtsson to pay SEK 8,250 and to return jewelry worth SEK 3,000 to her. He was also ordered to pay the woman's court costs of SEK 5,500 in the court of appeal and SEK 6,500 in the supreme court.

== Events ==
On Monday, 1 March 1971, the parties gathered in a deliberation room inside the regular courtroom at Söderhamn Courthouse in Southeast Hälsingland's judicial district in central Söderhamn. Present were lawspeaker Yngve Carlson, Cecilia Ekestang, Stockholm, and her lawyer Ingemar Wåhlstedt, Stockholm, as well as home owner Gunnar Bengtsson with his lawyer Olof Fagerström, Hudiksvall. It is unclear what happened next, but Bengtsson pulled a gun. Lawspeaker Yngve Carlson made it to the threshold towards the corridor when he was hit by Bengtsson's bullets. One of the lawyers was hit when he tried to get past Bengtsson via the courtroom. Ekestang and one of the lawyers remained on the floor of the deliberation room. They had been surprised by Bengtsson just as they sat down at the table to begin the negotiations.

Due to a strike, there were only six more people in the new building in central Söderhamn. One of the clerks heard the shots and called the police. It quickly became clear who the perpetrator was. The police knew Bengtsson and his legal problems well. All surrounding police districts were alerted. Policemen with bulletproof vests and dogs circled the city. The publicity surrounding the case had been unusually large. This meant that Bengtsson did not hide his intention to "still fight to the end" to acquaintances. The court's staff had heard Bengtsson indicate many times that he would fight as far as he could against what he considered to be a miscarriage of justice. Bengtsson had also turned to a legal advice agency a few days earlier.

Within ten minutes, telephone alarms had gone out to all persons who in one way or another had to do with the civil case. One of Bengtsson's former lawyers, a reserve officer, had been asked if he had weapons at home to defend himself. After about an hour of scouting, it emerged that Bengtsson had been seen in a shop on the outskirts of Söderhamn. With the help of the business owner, it was found that Bengtsson was staying with a relative. Once there, the police met Bengtsson and the relative on their way into the relative's car, after which they drove towards the city centre and it was tailed by the police. Bengtsson directed the relative's car towards the police investigation center in the city centre. When Bengtsson got out of the car, every step he took was followed by plainclothes policemen. Bengtsson went towards the Domus building where he was arrested. Bengtsson was then unarmed.

== Victims ==
The victims were:

- Lawspeaker Yngve Carlson, 67, Söderhamn
- Olof Fagerström, 48, Hudiksvall, Bengtsson's lawyer
- Cecilia Ekestang, 67, Stockholm
- Ingemar Wåhlstedt, 57, Stockholm, Ekestang's lawyer

== Investigation ==
County Prosecutor K.G. Olsson requested that Bengtsson be detained on 3 March 1971. The day before, on 2 March, the first crime scene investigation was completed. It was then clear that 12 shots had been fired. Bengtsson had first shot Ekestang, then her lawyer and finally his own lawyer. However, he did not remember when he shot the lawspeaker. During the crime scene investigation, a steel spring from the weapon and a muzzle brake were found. These were found on lawyer Wåhlstedt's body and it was therefore suspected that a fight over the gun had occurred. According to Bengtsson himself, the triggering factor was that the woman made a facial expression just as they were about to enter the room and said something like "Now we're going to take more (money) from you...". Bengtsson was the last to enter the room where the shooting unfolded. During a check, it was found that there was only one report of threats against the woman. It was a few years earlier when Bengtsson had chased her with a pickaxe in the barn and she then reported this to the police. This report was never investigated as the woman withdrew it as the relationship between the two had changed.

When the criminal investigation police from Gävle on 3 March 1971 were to investigate Bengtsson's property in Vansäter, an explosion, a violent fire and another series of explosions were triggered. The building, which was completely destroyed, was booby trapped and the ignition device in a cabinet. First detective constable (förste kriminalassistent) Ture Fridh, police assistant Lars Rydberg and first police constable Stig Jonassson all escaped unharmed.

In May 1971 it was reported that Bengtsson had also booby trapped his property in Villsjön. The explosive charge, which was placed just inside the front door of the property in Villsjön, Bengtsson's childhood home, contained, among other things, dynamite.

On 4 March remand hearings were held in the session hall of Söderhamn Town Hall and not in the courthouse where the murders took place. Lawspeaker Nils Baumbardt from Bollnäs decided on remanding and a psychiatric examination of Bengtsson. County prosecutor K.G. Olsson announced that Bengtsson was a suspect in the four murders, however, he did not address the explosions in Bengtsson's house. Bengtsson claimed his innocence and that all of Sweden's prosecutors and courts had acted wrongly in his civil case and that all lawyers were indirectly responsible for the murders. Bengtsson now had a new lawyer, Henning Sjöström.

== Trial ==
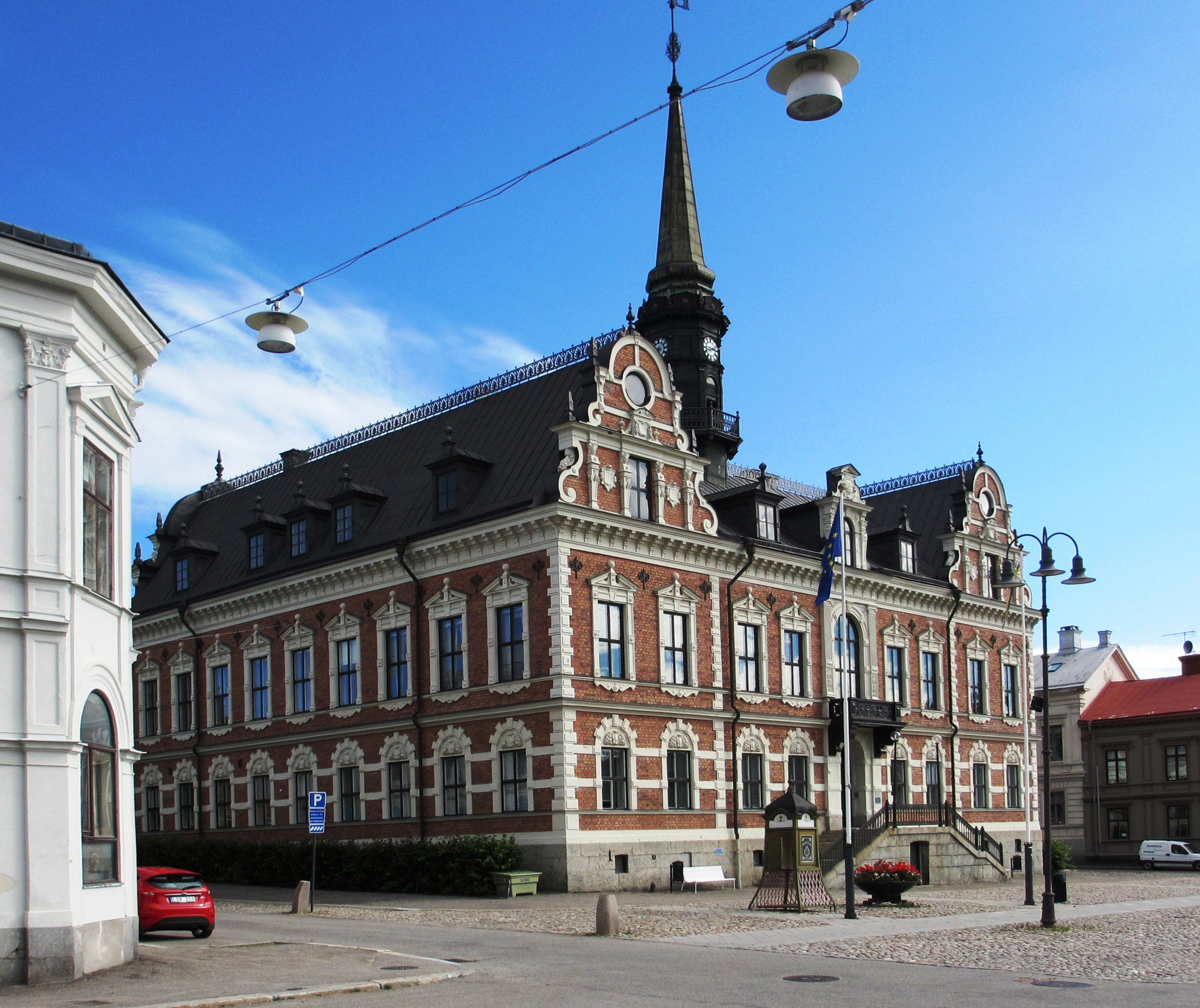
The trial was held between August and September 1971 in Söderhamn Town Hall.

The trial began on 9 August 1971 in the Söderhamn Town Hall. A total of 12 witnesses were heard in the case. The chairman at the hearing was, for acting lawspeaker Lars Villius from Gothenburg. Bengtsson's defence lawyer Henning Sjöström had called seven witnesses and county prosecutor K.G. Olsson five. County prosecutor Olsson claimed premeditated murder and lawyer Sjöström contested murder but admitted manslaughter. Bengtsson himself said that the event was a consequence of him having to endure stress that destroyed his sanity and that it was others who should take responsibility for what happened. When a verdict from a previous trial was read out, he said: "–I don't hear what's being said, but maybe it doesn't matter. It's the same old lies as usual". Bengtsson emphasized during the trial that he first shot Ekestang, then Wåhlstedt and then Fagerström. After the murders, he had intended to throw the gun into the river but didn't dare because a child would get hold of it. He also claimed that he carried a gun a little from time to time without having any intention of using it.

On 14 September 1971, Bengtsson was sentenced for murder to be committed to institutional psychiatric care. The district court found that Bengtsson committed the acts under the influence of mental illness. The court emphasized that he obviously, as the National Board of Health and Welfare also highlighted, as a result of the disease is dangerous for the society. Bengtsson was also convicted of criminal possession of a weapon. To the estate of Cecilia Ekestang, he was to pay damages of SEK 6,000.

== Mördaren i byn ==
In 1975, Henning Sjöström's novel Mördaren i byn ("The killer in the village") was published, which was inspired by, and showed similarities with, the courthouse murders. Expressen's head of culture at the time Bo Strömstedt believed that Sjöström was doxing his clients and perceived this action as deeply unethical. This led to an intense debate between the lawyer and the publicist, and Sjöström sued the newspaper's then-editor-in-chief Per Wrigstad for gross defamation, a lawsuit that was, however, withdrawn. Sjöström and Strömstedt also met in an hour and a half hour long TV debate in Mot väggen led by Siewert Öholm. In addition, in 1976 Bengtsson sued Sjöström for defamation in a freedom of the press case, where Ernst-Hugo Järegård participated in the trial by reading aloud from the book. However, Sjöström was acquitted by the court.
