= Helena Mannervesi =

Finnish orienteering competitor

Medal record

Women's orienteering

Representing Finland

World Championships
Silver medal – second place	1981 Thun	Relay

Helena Mannervesi (born 1946) is a Finnish orienteering competitor. She received a silver medal in the relay event at the 1981 World Orienteering Championships in Thun together with Marita Ruoho, Liisa Veijalainen and Outi Borgenström.

== See also ==
- Finnish orienteers
- List of orienteers
- List of orienteering events
