= Sigurd Dæhli =

Norwegian orienteer (born 1953)

Personal information
- Born: 6 May 1953 (age 73)
- Children: Magne Dæhli

Sport
- Sport: Orienteering; Ski orienteering; Trail orienteering
- Club: Nordbygda IL; Løten O-lag; NTHI; Sturla
Medal record
Representing Norway
Men's orienteering
World Championships
| Gold medal – first place | 1981 Thun | Relay |
| Bronze medal – third place | 1983 Zalaegerszeg | Individual |
Men's ski-orienteering
World Championships
| Gold medal – first place | 1986 Batak | Relay |
| Silver medal – second place | 1982 Aigen | Relay |
| Bronze medal – third place | 1982 Aigen | Individual |
| Bronze medal – third place | 1984 Lavarone | Relay |
Trail orienteering
World Championships
| Silver medal – second place | 2017 Birstonas | Relay |

Sigurd Dæhli (born 6 May 1953) is a Norwegian orienteering competitor. He became Relay World Champion in 1981, by participating on the Norwegian winning team in Thun, Switzerland. He obtained bronze in the 1983 Individual World Orienteering Championships in Zalaegerszeg, Hungary.

== Orienteering career ==
Dæhli made his debut in senior Norwegian Championships in 1973, and since then had more than 100 starts in the national championships. He was winner of the first official Norwegian Night Orienteering Championship in 1979, and has participated on the winning relay team seven times in the national championships. He won gold medal in the Nordic Championships in Finland in 1977, and has two relay gold medals in the Nordic Championships (from 1980 and 1982).

At the 1981 World Orienteering Championships in Thun, Switzerland, he won a gold medal in the relay, along with Øyvin Thon, Harald Thon and Tore Sagvolden. He won an individual bronze medal at the 1983 World Orienteering Championships in Zalaegerszeg, behind Morten Berglia and Øyvin Thon.

He has won WMOC (World Master Orienteering Championships) several times.

== Ski orienteering ==
Dæhli also competed in ski orienteering, obtaining an individual bronze medal in the 1982 World Championships in Austria, a silver medal in the relay in 1982 (together with Finn Kinneberg, Tore Sagvolden and Morten Berglia), and a relay gold medal in the 1986 World Championships in Bulgaria.

== Family ==
Sigurd Dæhli is the father of international orienteer Magne Dæhli.
