= Rytkönen =

Rytkönen is a Finnish surname.

== Geographical distribution ==
As of 2014, 94.7% of all known bearers of the surname Rytkönen were residents of Finland (frequency 1:1,848), 3.6% of Sweden (1:87,139) and 1.0% of Estonia (1:10,167).

In Finland, the frequency of the surname was higher than national average (1:1,848) in the following regions:

1. Northern Savonia (1:375)
2. Kainuu (1:896)
3. Central Finland (1:1,387)
4. North Karelia (1:1,395)
5. Southern Savonia (1:1,644)
6. Lapland (1:1,650)

== People ==
- August Rytkönen (1886–1960), Finnish construction worker and politician
- Aulis Rytkönen (1929–2014), Finnish footballer
- Arvo Rytkönen (1929–1980), Finnish Minister of Trade and Industry
- Seppo Rytkönen, Finnish orienteering competitor
