= Lars-Henrik Undeland =

Swedish orienteering competitor

Medal record

Men's orienteering

Representing Sweden

World Championships
Silver medal – second place	1981 Thun	Relay

Lars-Henrik Undeland (born 5 July 1954) is a Swedish orienteering competitor. He received a silver medal in the relay event at the 1981 World Orienteering Championships in Thun, together with Bengt Levin, Jörgen Mårtensson and Lars Lönnkvist, and placed 12th in the individual event. He placed first in the 5-days event O-Ringen in 1979.
