= Bengt Levin =

Swedish orienteer (1958–2020)

Medal record

Men's orienteering

Representing Sweden

World Championships
| Silver medal – second place | 1981 Thun | Relay |
| Bronze medal – third place | 1983 Zalaegerszeg | Relay |

Bengt Levin (30 September 1958 – 1 January 2020) was a Swedish orienteering competitor. He won a silver medal in the relay event at the 1981 World Orienteering Championships in Thun, along with Lars-Henrik Undeland, Jörgen Mårtensson and Lars Lönnkvist. At the 1983 World Championships in Zalaegerszeg he placed 14th in the classic distance, and won a bronze medal with the Swedish relay team. He won the 1984 Jukola relay.
