= Barbro Lönnkvist =

Swedish orienteering competitor

Medal record

Women's orienteering

Representing Sweden

World Championships
Gold medal – first place	1981 Thun	Relay

Barbro Lönnkvist (born 22 June 1959) is a Swedish orienteering competitor. She became a Relay World Champion in 1981 as a member of the Swedish winning team, together with team members Arja Hannus, Karin Rabe and Annichen Kringstad.

Lönnkvist was placed first at the Swedish 5-day O-Ringen event in Sundsvall in 1988, and again in Östersund in 1989.
