= Per Halle =

Norwegian long-distance runner

Per Halle (born 6 May 1949) is a former Norwegian long-distance runner who specialized in the 5000 metres. He represented IF Sturla.

At the 1972 Summer Olympics he finished seventh in the 5000 m final in 13:34.4 minutes. At the 1972 European Indoor Championships he finished fifth in 3000 metres. He became Norwegian champion in 1972.

His personal best time was 13:27.6 minutes, achieved in July 1974 at Bislett Stadion.

Halle later coached his daughter Gunhild Halle Haugen.
