= Ruth Humbel =

Swiss politician

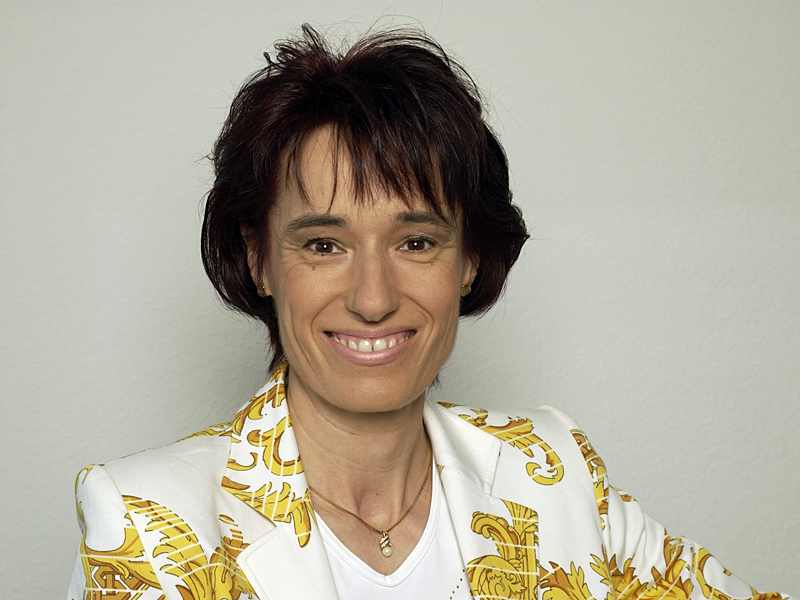

Medal record

Women's orienteering

Representing Switzerland

World Championships
Bronze medal – third place	1978 Kongsberg	Relay
Bronze medal – third place	1981 Thun	Relay
Bronze medal – third place	1985 Bendigo	Relay

Ruth Humbel (born 23 July 1957) is a Swiss politician (CVP) who was a member of the Federal Assembly from 2003 to 2023. She is also an orienteering competitor at international level. She won bronze medals in the relay at the World Orienteering Championships in 1978, 1981 and 1985. She placed fourth in the individual event at the 1981 World Championships, and fifth in the relay in 1979.

== Personal life ==
Humbel lives in the municipality of Birmenstorf in the canton Aargau in Switzerland. She is married to historian Beat Näf, and has two children, born in 1991 and 1994.

== Sports career ==
Humbel was five times individual Swiss Champion in Orienteering. She was part of the Swiss national team from 1975 to 1987, and competed in seven World Orienteering Championships.

At the 1976 World Orienteering Championships in Aviemore she placed 19th in the classic distance. The 1978 World Championships were held in Kongsberg, Norway. Humbel started both in the individual competition, where she placed 13th, and in the relay. The Swiss team earned a bronze medal, behind Finland and Sweden, in a close finish two seconds ahead of the Norway team. Also on the Swiss team were Ruth Baumberger and Hanni Fries. In Tampere in 1979 she placed 25th in the individual competition, and fifth with the Swiss team, which consisted of Annelies Meier, Humbel and Fries. In 1981 the World Championships were held in Thun, in her home country. Humbel achieved her best individual result, placing fourth. In the relay Switzerland won the bronze medal, behind Sweden and Finland. On the Swiss team were Ruth Schmid, Annelies Meier Irene Bucher and Humbel. In Zalaegerszeg in 1983 she placed 31st in the individual course, and fifth in the relay. In Bendigo in 1985 she placed 28th in the individual course, and the Swiss team won a bronze medal in the relay. Her last appearance at the World Orienteering Championships was in Gerardmer in 1987. She placed 18th in the individual competition, and sixth in the relay.

== Political career ==
Humbel was a member (German: Grossrätin) of the Aargau Parliament (German: Kantonsparlament) from 1981 to 2003. In 2003 she was elected to the National Council of Switzerland, and reelected in 2007 and later, serving as delegate until 2023. She represented the canton Aargau, and the Christian Democratic People's Party of Switzerland. In the parliament she was a member of the Health Commission (German: Kommission für soziale Sicherheit und Gesundheit NR) and the Staatspolitische Kommission NR, and a former member of the Commission of Justice (German: Gerichtskommission).
