= Ljusne =

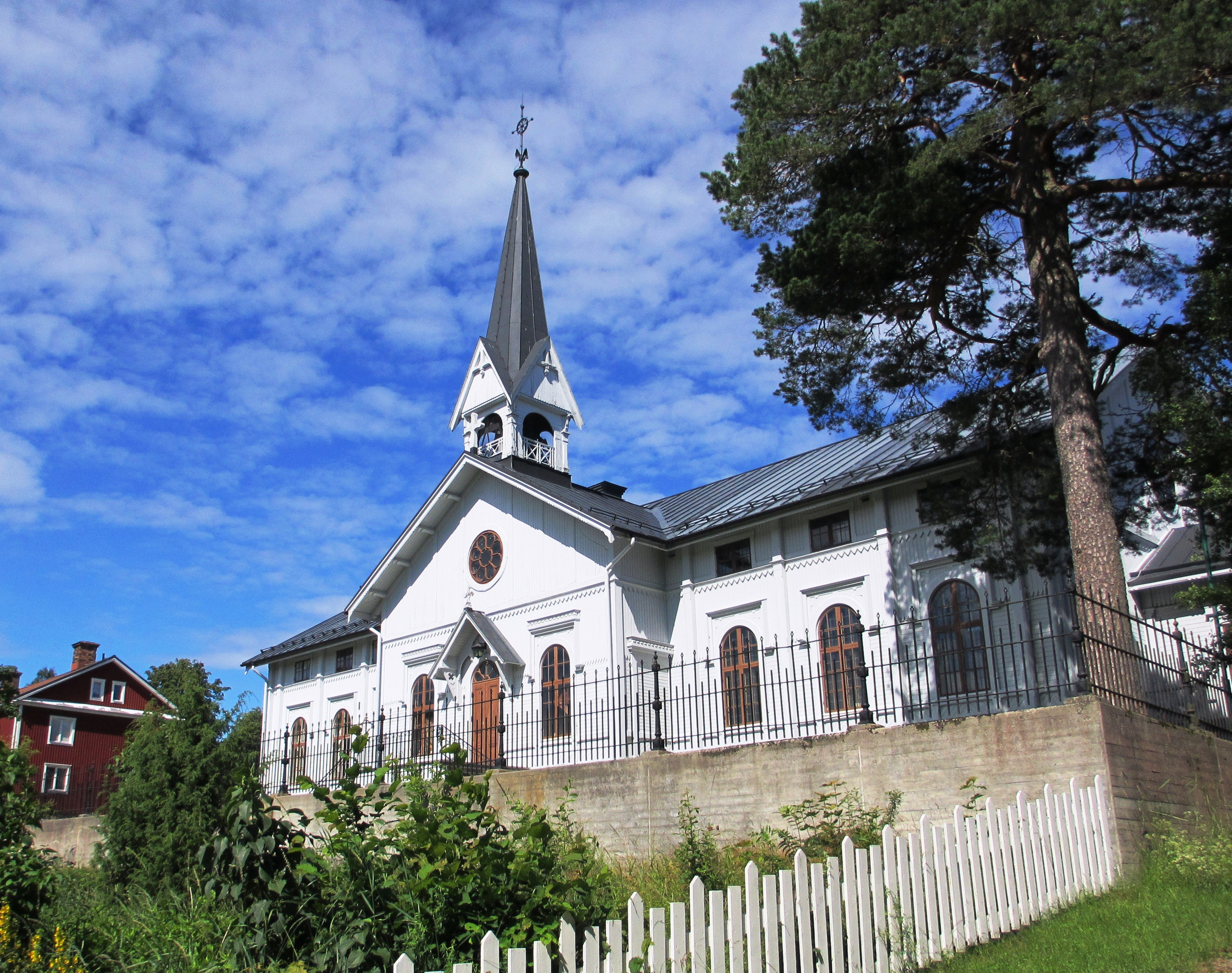
- Ljusne Church

- Location within Sweden Gävleborg Location within Sweden
- Coordinates: 61°13′N 17°08′E
- Country: Sweden
- Province: Hälsingland
- County: Gävleborg County
- Municipality: Söderhamn Municipality

Area
  - Total: 3.95 km^{2} (1.53 sq mi)

Population (31 December 2010)
  - Total: 1,917
  - Density: 485/km^{2} (1,260/sq mi)
- Time zone: UTC+1 (CET)
  - Summer (DST): UTC+2 (CEST)

Ljusne is a locality situated in Söderhamn Municipality, Gävleborg County, Sweden with 1,917 inhabitants in 2010.

== Riksdag elections ==
The heavily industrialized Ljusne has historically been one of the furthest left villages in Sweden. As of 2018, in every national election, the Social Democrats had received more than half of the vote, sometimes close to 80 % of the vote. In addition, the Left Party would frequently getting an additional 10 %, making the left-wing parties reach nine out of ten votes. In the 21st century, the centre-right parties increased their vote share but were still in a sizeable minority. Ljusne has formed the core of the left-wing dominance of Söderhamn Municipality since the current borders were formed.

| Year | % | Votes | V | S | MP | C | L | KD | M | SD | NyD | Left | Right |
|---|---|---|---|---|---|---|---|---|---|---|---|---|---|
| 1973 | 95.0 | 3,180 | 11.1 | 77.3 | | 6.4 | 1.7 | 0.3 | 2.6 | | | 88.4 | 10.8 |
| 1976 | 95.4 | 3,274 | 9.3 | 78.4 | | 7.3 | 2.0 | 0.4 | 2.4 | | | 87.7 | 11.6 |
| 1979 | 94.3 | 3,081 | 9.9 | 79.4 | | 4.4 | 1.9 | 0.5 | 3.4 | | | 89.3 | 9.7 |
| 1982 | 94.6 | 2,999 | 9.8 | 80.1 | 1.0 | 3.4 | 1.1 | 0.5 | 3.9 | | | 89.9 | 8.4 |
| 1985 | 93.3 | 2,807 | 9.0 | 80.8 | 0.8 | 2.5 | 2.7 | | 4.2 | | | 89.8 | 9.3 |
| 1988 | 88.7 | 2,592 | 10.3 | 77.0 | 2.6 | 2.7 | 2.7 | 0.7 | 3.0 | | | 89.9 | 8.4 |
| 1991 | 87.2 | 2,452 | 8.8 | 74.6 | 1.6 | 2.7 | 2.2 | 1.5 | 5.8 | | 2.3 | 83.4 | 12.2 |
| 1994 | 88.4 | 2,304 | 10.1 | 77.3 | 2.3 | 1.6 | 2.2 | 0.3 | 5.3 | | 0.8 | 89.2 | 9.5 |
| 1998 | 83.3 | 1,925 | 23.2 | 61.9 | 2.1 | 1.1 | 1.0 | 2.9 | 5.0 | | | 87.3 | 10.1 |
| 2002 | 77.8 | 1,695 | 19.5 | 61.4 | 2.3 | 3.9 | 4.9 | 3.3 | 3.7 | 0.6 | | 83.2 | 15.8 |
| 2006 | 76.6 | 1,612 | 12.1 | 62.4 | 2.6 | 3.8 | 2.6 | 2.3 | 7.3 | 3.7 | | 77.3 | 16.0 |
| 2010 | 82.2 | 1,618 | 8.8 | 59.3 | 3.6 | 2.2 | 1.7 | 1.7 | 11.8 | 9.3 | | 71.7 | 17.3 |
| 2014 | 79.0 | 1,508 | 8.0 | 56.3 | 2.8 | 2.3 | 1.3 | 1.1 | 7.3 | 18.8 | | 67.1 | 12.0 |
| 2018 | 81.6 | 1,515 | 10.7 | 50.4 | 1.6 | 3.8 | 1.8 | 1.9 | 7.7 | 21.7 | | 66.5 | 33.1 |

== Sports ==
The following sports clubs are located in Ljusne:

- Ljusne AIK FF
