= Mohed =

- Location within Sweden Gävleborg Location within Sweden
- Coordinates: 61°18′N 16°50′E
- Country: Sweden
- Province: Hälsingland
- County: Gävleborg County
- Municipality: Söderhamn Municipality

Area
  - Total: 1.04 km^{2} (0.40 sq mi)

Population (31 December 2023)
  - Total: 315
  - Density: 304/km^{2} (790/sq mi)
- Time zone: UTC+1 (CET)
  - Summer (DST): UTC+2 (CEST)

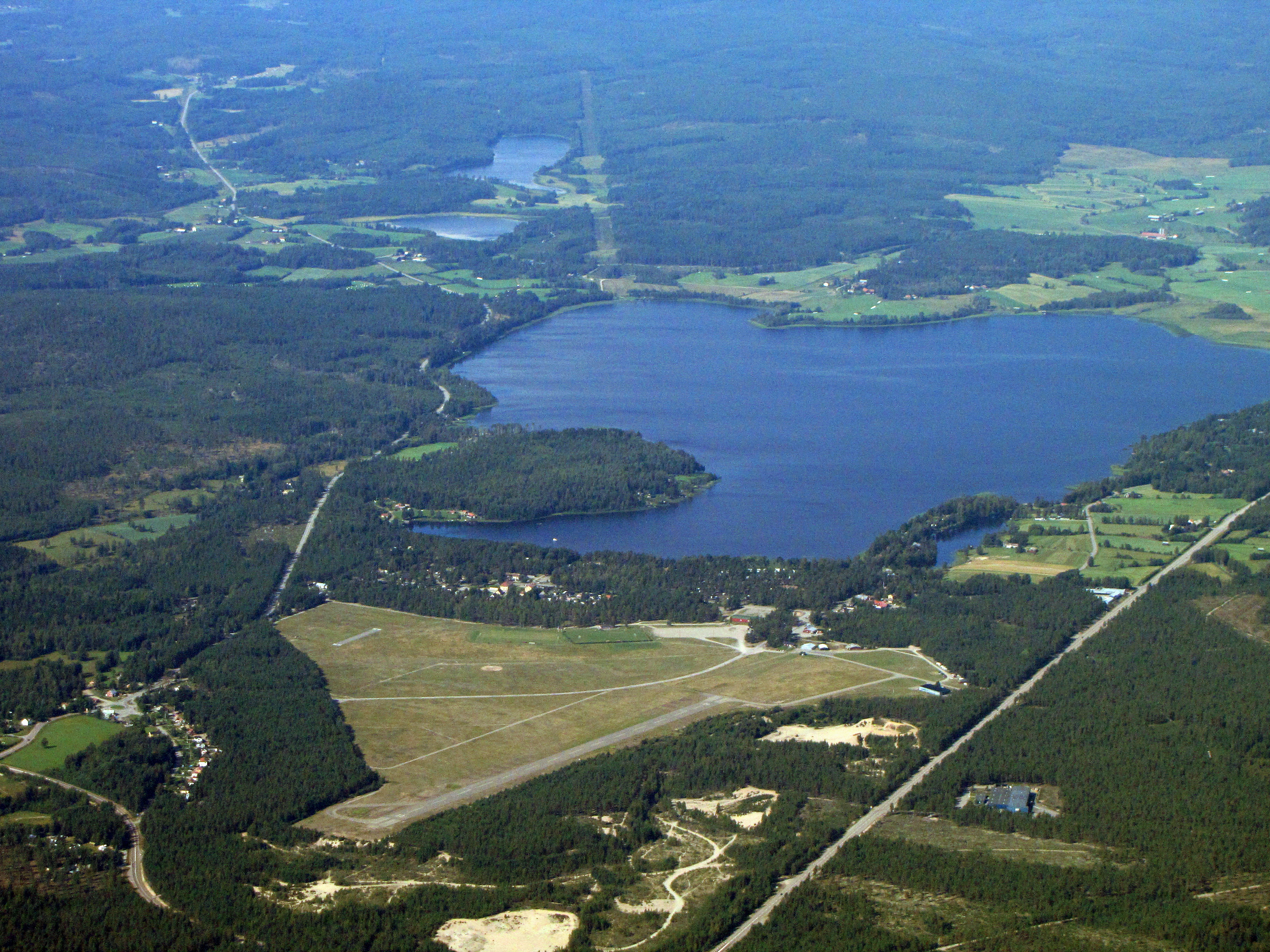
Airfield Mohed and the surrounding village Mohed in the foreground, with lake Florsjön in the background.

Mohed is a locality situated in Söderhamn Municipality, Gävleborg County, Sweden with 315 inhabitants in 2023. It was the site for the orienteering competition known as O-Ringen in 1981, 2006 and 2011.

It was during the period 1689-1908 center for the Hälsinge Regiment. The regiment moved to [Gävle] and the old barracks was transformed into a tuberculosis hospital from 1914. The hospital was closed down during the 1950s. A memorial stone was erected at the training grounds with the inscription "Mohed, Hälsinge regementes mötesplats 1689-1908".

During the period of 1729-1859 there was a linen factory with its own quality stamp. Such a stamp was very uncommon to be given to a factory in Sweden, usually it was being held by the kings appointed in the region. During it most productive period the factory employed about 200 persons.

The stretch of road going by the school and church was built by British sailors during World War II. The sailors were refugees from sunken ships that had been stranded on Swedish shores.
