= 1981 World Orienteering Championships =

1981 edition of the World Orienteering Championships

- Host city: Thun
- Country: Switzerland
- Events: 4

The 1981 World Orienteering Championships, the 9th World Orienteering Championships, were held in Thun, Switzerland, 3–5 September 1981.

The championships had four events: individual contests for men and women, and relays for men and women.

== Medalists ==
Event	Gold		Silver		Bronze	
Men's individual	Øyvin Thon (NOR)	1.30.05	Tore Sagvolden (NOR)	1.32.33	Morten Berglia (NOR)	1.33.10
Women's individual	Annichen Kringstad (SWE)	1.05.47	Brit Volden (NOR)	1.08.54	Karin Rabe (SWE)	1.09.40
Men's relay	Norway (NOR): Øyvin Thon; Harald Thon; Tore Sagvolden; Sigurd Dæhli	4.38.14	Sweden (SWE): Lars-Henrik Undeland; Bengt Levin; Jörgen Mårtensson; Lars Lönnkvist	4.38.47	Finland (FIN): Kari Sallinen; Ari Anjala; Seppo Rytkönen; Hannu Kottonen	4.45.23
Women's relay	Sweden (SWE): Arja Hannus; Barbro Lönnkvist; Karin Rabe; Annichen Kringstad	3.49.53	Finland (FIN): Helena Mannervesi; Marita Ruoho; Liisa Veijalainen; Outi Borgenström	4.05.07	Switzerland (SUI): Ruth Schmid; Annelies Meier; Irene Bucher; Ruth Humbel	4.13.10

== Results ==
=== Men's individual ===
WOC 1981 – Individual – Men (14.1 km)
Rank	Competitor	Nation	Time
1	Øyvin Thon	Norway	1:30:05
2	Tore Sagvolden	Norway	
3	Morten Berglia	Norway	
4	Lars Lönnkvist	Sweden	
5	Kari Sallinen	Finland	
6	Jörgen Mårtensson	Sweden	
7	Jaroslav Kačmarčík	Czechoslovakia	
8	Lars Konradsen	Denmark	
9	Martin Howald	Switzerland	
10	Harald Thon	Norway	
11	Ari Anjala	Finland	
12	Lars-Henrik Undeland	Sweden	

=== Women's individual ===
WOC 1981 – Individual – Women (8.7 km)
Rank	Competitor	Nation	Time
1	Annichen Kringstad	Sweden	1:05:47
2	Brit Volden	Norway	
3	Karin Rabe	Sweden	
4	Ruth Humbel	Switzerland	
5	Outi Borgenström	Finland	
6	Ada Kuchařová	Czechoslovakia	
7	Liisa Veijalainen	Finland	
8	Arja Hannus	Sweden	
9	Arja Haikarainen	Finland	
10	Ragnhild Bratberg	Norway	
11	Irene Bucher	Switzerland	
12	Svatava Nováková	Czechoslovakia	
