= Henning Sjöström =

Swedish lawyer

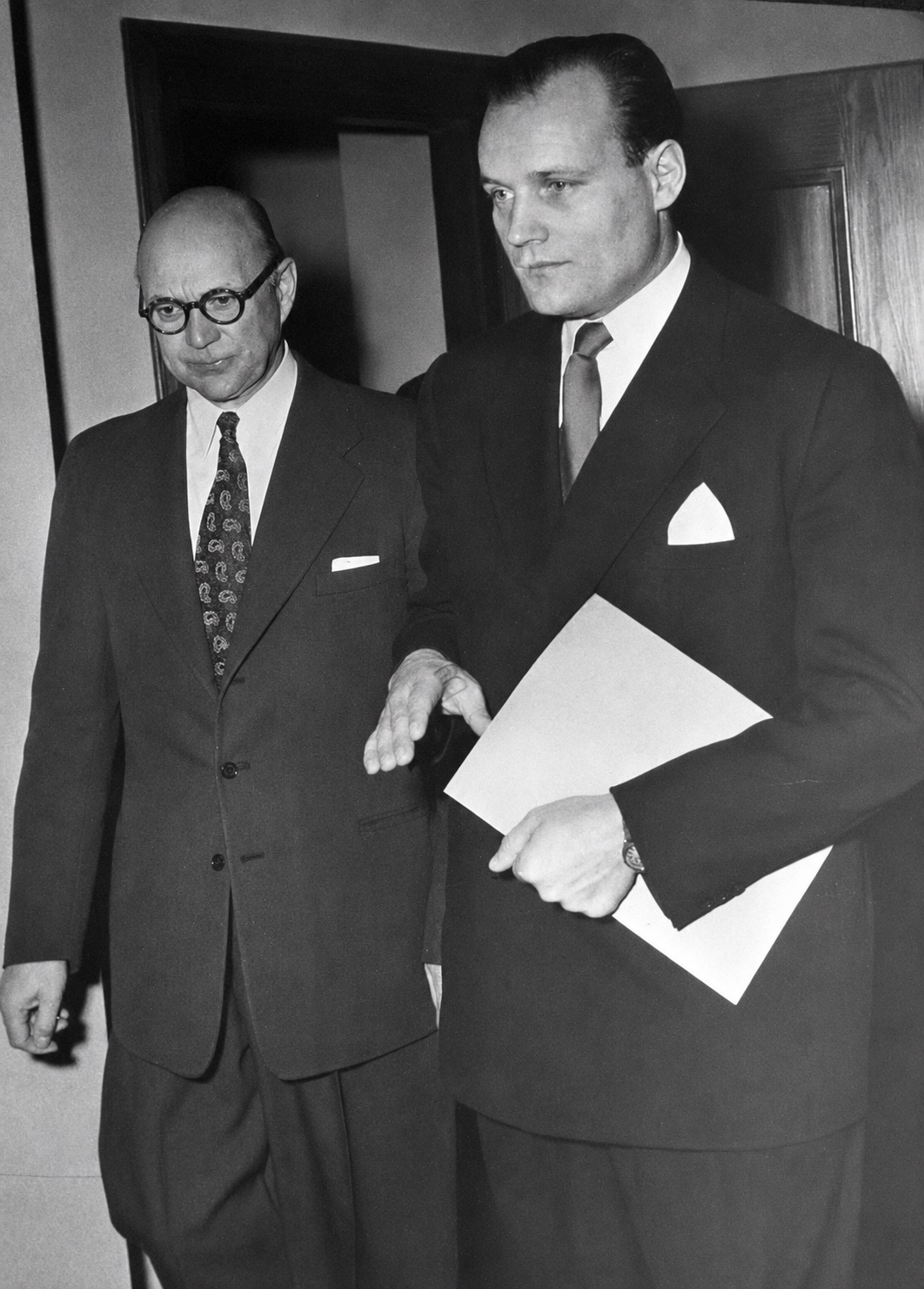
- Henning Sjöström (right) with Kurt Haijby in 1950
- Born: Henning Elof Sjöström; 13 May 1922; Burträsk, Sweden
- Died: 16 October 2011 (aged 89); Stockholm, Sweden
- Occupations: Lawyer, author
- Spouse(s): Karin Werner (m. 1959, divorced) Kerstin Sandels (m. 1968)
- Children: 1

Henning Elof Sjöström (13 May 1922 – 16 October 2011) was a Swedish defense attorney, and regarded as Sweden's first celebrity lawyer due to his high-profile cases. Sjöström was the attorney for Kurt Haijby during the Haijby affair, in which Haijby was accused of blackmailing Swedish King Gustav V. He was also known through the trial of the "neurosedyn children" 1964–1968 and for having defended Gunnar Bengtsson after the Söderhamn courthouse murders in 1971 and Carl-Eric Björkegren.

== Early life ==
Sjöström was born on 13 May 1922 in Burträsk, Sweden, the son of farmer and landowner Johan Sjöström and his wife Carolina (née Lindmark). He belonged to the elite in athletics where he competed in javelin throw for Skellefteå AIK Friidrott and set his personal record of 66.72 meters in 1944.

He completed his upper secondary school graduation examination in 1943 and earned a Candidate of Law degree in 1948.

== Career ==
Sjöström completed his judicial clerkship in the Central Västerbotten Judicial District from 1948 to 1949. He worked as an assistant lawyer at the legal aid offices of the City and County of Stockholm in 1949 and ran his own law practice from 1951 onward. He became a member of the Swedish Bar Association in 1953.

Many lawyers, including Leif Silbersky, received their training from Sjöström. Silbersky worked with him from 1962 to 1969, before starting his own firm.

Sjöström served on the boards of several limited companies and was chairman of the Swedish Boxing Association. He also served as Honorary Consul General of Senegal.

== Personal life ==
In 1959, Sjöström married Karin Werner (born 1936), the daughter of the lawyer Einar Werner and Annemarie Hardt. In 1968, he married the lawyer Kerstin Sandels.

== Death ==
Sjöström died in Stockholm in 2011. He was cared for at the end at Sofiagården in Stockholm.

== Bibliography ==
- Vägen från byn (1963)
- Vägen förbi (1965) (with Ernst Sjöström)
- Det glatta livet (1966) (with Ernst Sjöström)
- Så fortsatte vägen från byn (1968) (with Ernst Sjöström)
- Silverarken (1969) (with Ernst Sjöström)
- Brottstycken (1972)
- Kvinnorna i byn (1973)
- Männen från byn (1974)
- Mördaren i byn (1975) (with Gunnar Sjöström)
- Pigorna i byn (1976) (with Ernst Sjöström)
