= Annelies Meier =

Swiss orienteering competitor

Medal record

Women's orienteering

Representing Switzerland

World Championships
Bronze medal – third place	1981 Thun	Relay

Annelies Meier is a Swiss orienteering competitor. She won a bronze medal in the relay at the World Orienteering Championships in Thun in 1981, together with Ruth Schmid, Irene Bucher and Ruth Humbel.
