= Morten Berglia =

Norwegian orienteer (born 1958)

Personal information
- Born: 3 August 1958 (age 67)

Sport
- Sport: Orienteering
- Club: Eiker O-lag
Medal record
Men's orienteering
Representing Norway
World Championships
Gold medal – first place	1983 Zalaegerszeg	Individual
Gold medal – first place	1983 Zalaegerszeg	Relay
Gold medal – first place	1985 Bendigo	Relay
Gold medal – first place	1987 Gérardmer	Relay
Bronze medal – third place	1981 Thun	Individual

Morten Berglia (born 3 August 1958) is a Norwegian orienteering competitor.

He won a gold medal in the individual competition at the 1983 World Orienteering Championships, and obtained a bronze medal in 1981. He is also three times Relay World Champion, as a member of the Norwegian winning teams in 1983 (with Øyvin Thon, Tore Sagvolden and Harald Thon), 1985 (with Atle Hansen, Tore Sagvolden and Øyvin Thon) and 1987 (with Håvard Tveite, Tore Sagvolden and Øyvin Thon).

Berglia won five individual national titles in orienteering, winning the individual contest (the long distance) in 1981 and 1983, as well as the title in night orienteering 1985, 1988 and 1989. He was awarded the Kongepokal (King's Cup) trophy at the national championships twice, in 1981 and 1983.
