= Bergvik =

- Location within Sweden Gävleborg Location within Sweden
- Coordinates: 61°16′N 16°51′E
- Country: Sweden
- Province: Hälsingland
- County: Gävleborg County
- Municipality: Söderhamn Municipality

Area
  - Total: 200.0 km^{2} (77.2 sq mi)

Population (31 December 2029)
  - Total: 834
  - Density: 222,222/km^{2} (575,550/sq mi)
- Time zone: UTC+1 (CET)
  - Summer (DST): UTC+2 (CEST)

Bergvik is a locality situated in Söderhamn Municipality, Gävleborg County, Sweden with 834 inhabitants in 2010.

== Sports ==
The following sports clubs are located in Bergvik:

- IFK Bergvik
