= Sara Snogerup Linse =

Swedish chemist (1962)

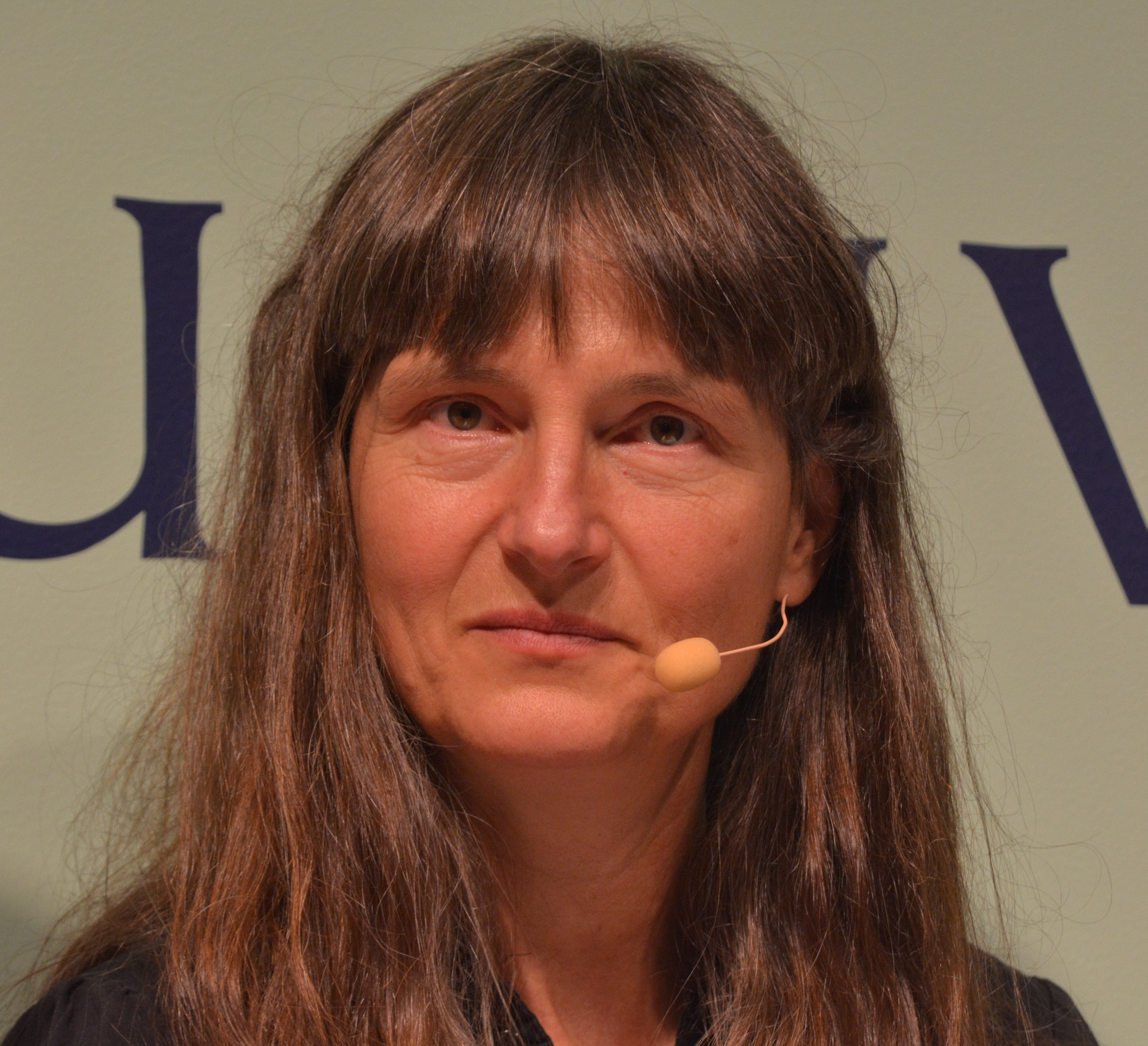
- Education: Lund University; Stanford University
- Scientific career
- Workplaces: Lund University

Sara Snogerup Linse (born 30 April 1962) is a Swedish Professor of Biochemistry at Lund University. Her research considers the molecular mechanisms of protein self-assembly in Alzheimer's disease. She serves as Chair of the Committee for the Nobel Prize in Chemistry. She was awarded the 2019 European Molecular Biology Organization Women in Science Award.

== Early life and education ==
Linse grew up in the Oskarshamn Municipality. Her parents are both botanists. She was thirteen years old when she first learned about proteins, and her high school teachers told her that there were still mysteries in establishing their structure – function properties. She studied chemical engineering at Lund University and Stanford University. She graduated in 1985 and started a doctorate at Lund University in physical chemistry. She then came across another challenge in biochemistry: the interaction of proteins with nanoparticles.

== Research and career ==
Linse was appointed to the faculty at Lund University in 1993, where she was promoted to Professor in 2004. Her research considers the molecular basis of neurological and metabolic diseases.

When proteins spontaneously aggregate they can form fibrous clumps known as amyloids. Amyloid-beta peptides are associated with several neurological diseases, including Alzheimer's and Parkinson's disease. Linse has demonstrated that the process of nucleation and growth of amyloid-beta peptide occurs in two phases; first the amyloid fibrils form and then monomers nucleate on the surface. This second nucleation event gives rise to most of the neuronal toxicity. Linse was supported by the Knut and Alice Wallenberg Foundation to investigate the role of fat in protein self-assembly. Fat molecules (lipids) are often present when aggregations are formed, but the majority of research considers how proteins attach to the cell membrane.

Her research makes use of a variety of analytical tools to study protein amyloid formation. In 2020 Linse and co-workers announced a mathematical model that could be used to describe the chemical reactions that are responsible for the fibroid aggregation associated with Alzheimer's disease.

=== Awards and honours ===
Her awards and honours include:

- 2004 Elected to the Royal Swedish Academy of Sciences
- 2007 National Academy of Sciences Cozzarelli Prize
- 2011 International Union of Pure and Applied Chemistry Distinguished Woman in Chemistry prize
- 2012 Joined the Nobel Prize in Chemistry Committee
- 2014 KTH Royal Institute of Technology Great Prize
- 2019 European Molecular Biology Organization Women in Science Award

=== Selected publications ===
Her publications include:

- Linse, Sara (2007-02-13). "Understanding the nanoparticle–protein corona using methods to quantify exchange rates and affinities of proteins for nanoparticles". Proceedings of the National Academy of Sciences. 104 (7): 2050–2055. doi:10.1073/pnas.0608582104. PMC 1892985. PMID 17267609.
- Linse, Sara (2007-05-22). "Nucleation of protein fibrillation by nanoparticles". Proceedings of the National Academy of Sciences. 104 (21): 8691–8696. Bibcode:2007PNAS..104.8691L. doi:10.1073/pnas.0701250104. PMC 1866183. PMID 17485668.
- Linse, Sara (2007-10-31). "The nanoparticle–protein complex as a biological entity; a complex fluids and surface science challenge for the 21st century". Proceedings of the National Academy of Sciences. 134: 167–174. doi:10.1016/j.cis.2007.04.021. PMID 17574200.

Linse publishes children's books with her partner Kyrre Thalberg. These have included Draksommar, Kjetil och Jostein, Höst i Drakbergen, Prins Pralin åker buss, and Karnevalen i Brind. She is also 2018 World Masters Orienteering Champion.
