= Seppo Rytkönen =

Finnish orienteering competitor

Medal record

Men's orienteering

Representing Finland

World Championships
Bronze medal – third place	1981 Thun	Relay

Seppo Rytkönen is a Finnish orienteering competitor. He received a bronze medal in the relay event at the 1981 World Orienteering Championships in Thun, together with Kari Sallinen, Ari Anjala and Hannu Kottonen.

== See also ==
- Finnish orienteers
- List of orienteers
- List of orienteering events
