= Niklas Löwegren =

Swedish orienteering competitor

Medal record

Men's orienteering

Representing Sweden

World Cup
Silver medal – second place	1990	Overall WC

Niklas Löwegren is a Swedish orienteering competitor.

He finished 2nd overall in the Orienteering World Cup in 1990, only 3 points behind winner Håvard Tveite. He finished 14th in the World Cup 1988.

In 1989 he won the prestigious Swedish 5-days race O-Ringen.

He competed at the 1991 World Orienteering Championships in Mariánské Lázně, where he finished 7th in the short course.
