= Sivar Nordström =

Swedish orienteering competitor

Personal information
- Born: 1933
- Died: 2013 (aged 79–80)

Sport
- Sport: Orienteering
Medal record
Men's orienteering
Representing Sweden
European Championships
Bronze medal – third place	1962 Løten	Individual

Sivar Nordström (11 March 1933 – November 2013) was a Swedish orienteering competitor. He won a bronze medal in the individual event at the 1962 European Orienteering Championships in Løten Municipality, Norway.

Nordström competed for Tierps IF. He won Tiomila in 1966 together with Mats Lindh, Börje Jansson, Erik Hilmersson, Roland Johansson, Bertil Persson, Hans Nordström, Sivar Nordström, Ingvar Nordström, Tord Lindh and Inge Jansson. Tierps IF also came second in Tiomila in 1958.

Nordström was a co-founder of O-Ringen in 1965, along with Peo Bengtsson.

== Selected publications ==
- Om orsakerna till snytbaggeangrepp på grönrisplanteringar i sydöstra Sverige
- Orientering - idrott - samhälle
- Studier över torkning hos klosslagd, obarkad tallmassaved i fallande längder och standardlängder
- Über die Ursachen der Rüsselkäferschäden an Grünreisigpflanzungen im südöstlichen Schweden
