= Marmaskogen =

- Location within Sweden Gävleborg Location within Sweden
- Coordinates: 61°17′N 16°54′E
- Country: Sweden
- Province: Hälsingland
- County: Gävleborg County
- Municipality: Söderhamn Municipality

Area
  - Total: 198 km^{2} (76 sq mi)

Population (31 December 2023)
  - Total: 1,205
  - Density: 608/km^{2} (1,570/sq mi)
- Time zone: UTC+1 (CET)
  - Summer (DST): UTC+2 (CEST)

Marmaskogen is a locality situated in Söderhamn Municipality, Gävleborg County, Sweden with 1,205 inhabitants in 2023.
