= Viken, Sweden =

Viken
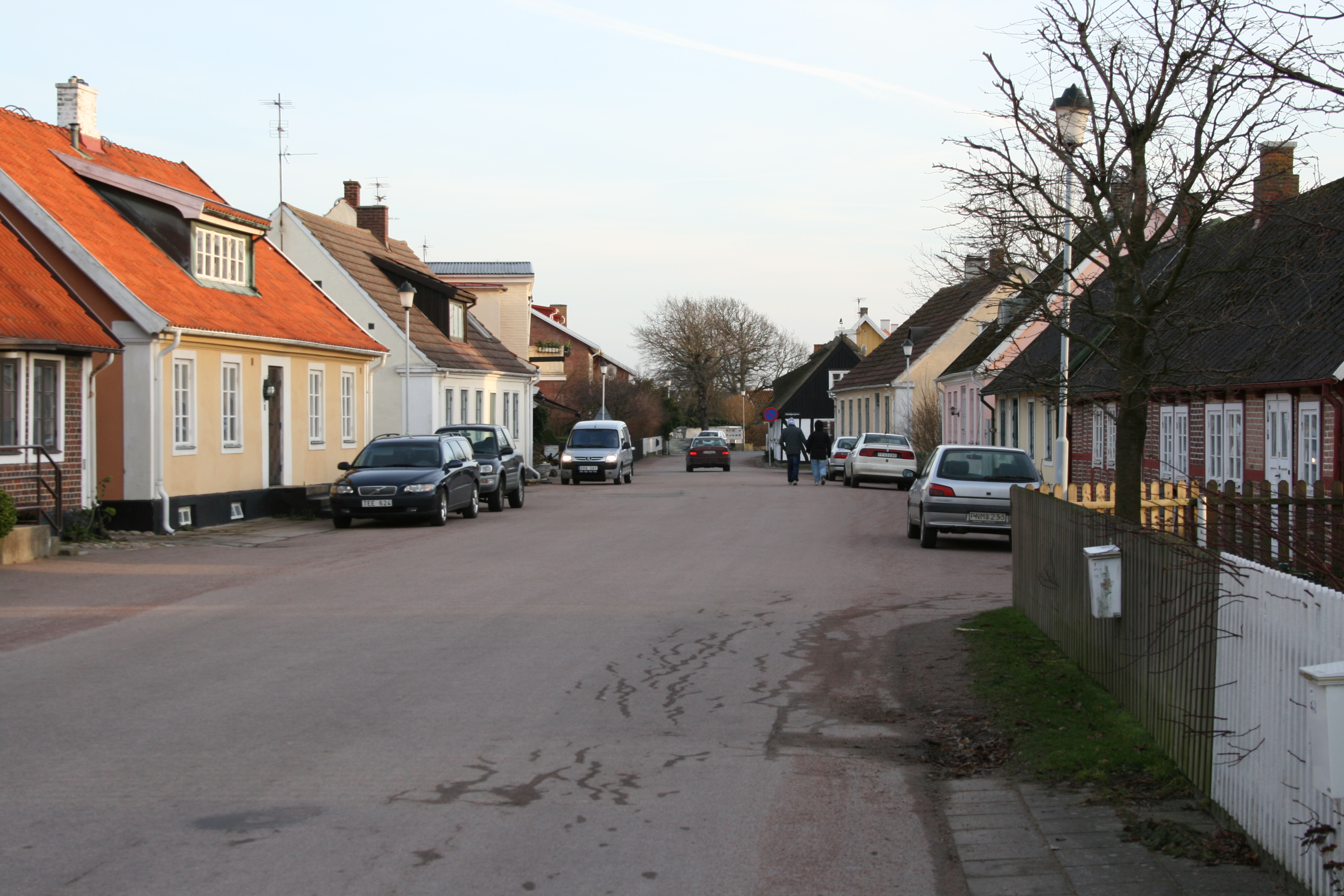

- Location within Skåne Location within Sweden
- Coordinates: 56°09′N 12°34′E
- Country: Sweden
- Province: Skåne
- County: Skåne County
- Municipality: Höganäs Municipality and Helsingborg Municipality

Area
  - Total: 2.45 km^{2} (0.95 sq mi)

Population (31 December 2010)
  - Total: 4,227
  - Density: 1,728/km^{2} (4,480/sq mi)
- Time zone: UTC+1 (CET)
  - Summer (DST): UTC+2 (CEST)

Viken is situated in Höganäs Municipality in Skåne County, Sweden with 4,227 inhabitants in 2010. It has a surface area of 224 hectares. 223 of these are in the Höganäs municipality.

Well known for its harbour, the village has a long history of seafaring and fishing. It is also known for the distinctive, mostly yellow, seaside cabins lining its vast public beach.

Viken is known to have been the home of billionaire Carl-Eric Björkegren, who disappeared without a trace in 1994. Theories vary in terms of what happened. In 2005, he was declared dead by the Stockholm District Court.

Rune Andréasson, the creator of the Swedish comic character Bamse, lived and died in Viken.

== Etymology ==
Viken is the definite form (the noun + the definite suffix -en) of the Old Norse word vík meaning an inlet or creek (UK).

== Notable people from Viken ==
- Rune Andréasson - Comic Artist
- Tove Lo - Singer
