= Carl-Eric Björkegren =

Swedish director, art collector, and businessman

- Born: 9 October 1920; Eslöv, Sweden
- Disappeared: 2 June 1994 (aged 73); Viken, Sweden
- Status: Declared dead in absentia 11 November 2005
- Education: Gothenburg School of Business, Economics and Law
- Occupations: Director, businessman
- Employer: Sandvik AB (1953–1981)
- Spouse(s): Karin Varenius (m. 1948; div. 1959) Alabritt Bakke (m. 1963; div. 1987) Sophie Krönlein (m. 1990; div. 1993)
- Children: 5

Carl-Eric Björkegren (born 9 October 1920 – disappeared 2 June 1994) was a Swedish director, art collector, and businessman. After a successful career within the steel conglomerate Sandvik AB, he transitioned into the financial industry - leveraging and acquiring real estate, stocks, and art. For many, he was a symbol of the 1980s boom economy. Björkegren was, for a period, one of Sweden's wealthiest individuals and possessed what was described as Sweden's finest private art collection. In the early 1990s, his empire crumbled, and he eventually declared personal bankruptcy with 1.3 billion Swedish kronor in debt. In 1994, he disappeared without a trace. On 11 November 2005, Björkegren was declared dead in absentia by the Stockholm District Court.

== Early life ==
Björkegren was born on 9 October 1920 in Eslöv, Sweden, the son of Carl Björkegren, a merchant, and his wife Judith (née Jansson). He passed studentexamen in Helsingborg in 1938. Björkegren was commissioned as an officer on 1 September 1944 and was promoted to lieutenant on 1 June 1946. Björkegren belonged to the North Scanian Infantry Regiment (I 6). He graduated from the Gothenburg School of Business, Economics and Law in Gothenburg in 1949.

== Career ==
Björkegren worked as an accountant at Sandvikens Jernverks AB in 1953, became an intendant in 1958, and assumed the position of chief financial officer in 1961. Björkegren became the deputy managing director in 1965 and held the position of first deputy managing director from 1979 to 1981. He retired in 1981.

In the early 1960s, Björkegren had borrowed 200,000 kronor from Hugo Stenbeck and purchased Sandvik shares. However, not all of these transactions were completely legal, and Björkegren was convicted as Sweden's first insider offender in 1982. Along with his director colleague Lars Forsberg, they had purchased 30,000 shares in Sandvik without informing the Securities Register Centre. For Björkegren's part, this offense resulted in a penalty of 25 day-fines of 1,000 kronor each.

He was the chairman of the board of directors in Barkman & Co AB, Indata AB, AB Betula, and Royal Classics Hotels in Copenhagen, as well as Läkerol-Ahlgrens in Gävle. Björkegren was also the Consul General of Guinea. He later became the largest shareholder in Gränges and acquired the majority of the real estate management company Storstaden. In 1980, Björkegren bought thousands of shares in the medal company AB Sporrong in Norrtälje. After retiring, Björkegren speculated in hotels (including Hotel d'Angleterre in Copenhagen and Sheraton Stockholm Hotel in Stockholm), as well as other properties, stocks, and art.

Björkegren had what was described as Sweden's finest private art collection, featuring works by Picasso, Miró, Chagall and Grünewald, among others. The collection was valued at half a billion Swedish kronor. In 1987, Björkegren was named Private Economist of the Year and stated, "I buy art with my own money, I do business with borrowed funds." In the late 1980s, he purchased 50 percent of the painting Midvinterblot by Carl Larsson, with the other half owned by an art dealer. According to Björkegren himself, this purchase was the only speculative investment he ever made. The painting was later sold to a private collector in Japan.

Björkegren resided for a period of time in the 1980s, in Wennergrenska palatset in Diplomatstaden, Stockholm, and in Villa Bonde. Björkegren later moved to Narvavägen but lost the apartment when he divorced in 1993. He then moved to the summer villa in Viken, Scania, which was purchased for 5.5 million kronor. As a financier and one of Sweden's wealthiest individuals, Björkegren invested extensively in real estate, stocks, and art. At the height of his success, he was believed to be worth 2.5 billion kronor, although much of it eventually turned out to be illusory, meaning debts without guarantee. In the early 1990s, his empire crumbled due to the prevailing real estate and banking crisis, which led to a sharp decline in property and stock prices. The art market also suffered a significant downturn. When Björkegren was forced to default on his payments, all artworks were pledged as collateral, and a significant portion of the collection was sold. The majority of his debts were related to guarantee commitments, but he also had personal debts of approximately 220 million kronor, mainly due to personal consumption. He had acquired properties in places like London and Florida.

Björkegren had, to a large extent, heavily leveraged his assets and simultaneously provided personal guarantees for his companies. Björkegren was eventually declared personally bankrupt in 1991 with debts totaling 1.3 billion Swedish kronor, which still remains Sweden's largest personal bankruptcy as of 2011. Most of this resulted from his personal guarantees for loans that his companies had taken, particularly the scandal-ridden Nyckeln, the largest creditor. Despite losing his entire fortune and the Swedish Enforcement Authority seizing the 50,000 kronor that Sandvik AB paid him in pension every month, Björkegren continued to live well. Together with Gota Bank, he ensured that ownership of the house in Viken was transferred to his daughters, who also took over the property's loans. Later, it was discovered that Björkegren had stashed away several million in a secret bank account in Switzerland. These funds were used, among other things, to pay a butler who managed the household in Viken and took care of various practical matters for him.

== Personal life ==
=== Marriages and children ===
On 3 March 1948, Björkegren married Karin Varenius (1920–1984), daughter of director Ivar Varenius (1889–1954) and his wife Hellen Sjögren (1894–1925). They had three children: Bo (born 1945), Eva (born 1948), and Agneta (born 1952). They divorced in 1959.

In 1963, Björkegren married Alabritt Bakke (1931–2019), daughter of director Henry Bakke and Annalisa Stång. They had two children: Anne (born 1971) and Carl (born 1973). They divorced in 1987.

In 1990, Björkegren married Sophie Krönlein (1937–2025). They divorced in 1993.

=== Disappearance ===
On 2 June 1994, Björkegren disappeared without a trace from his residence in Viken, south of Höganäs in Scania, just hours before he was supposed to board a plane to Stockholm, where his lawyer Henning Sjöström and his daughter Eva were waiting for him in a pre-booked room at the Grand Hôtel. The theories differ on whether he staged his own escape or was eliminated by shady business associates. Everything suggests that he is no longer alive, despite occasional reports of sightings of individuals resembling him. For instance, there were tips that he was shopping at Nordiska Kompaniet in Stockholm, staying in hotels in Oman, visiting banks in Switzerland, and residing in the house of the prima donna Git Gay’s brother in Paraguay.

He was reported missing by his family a little over two weeks after his disappearance. Björkegren's butler was the last person to see him alive. According to the butler's testimony, Björkegren was at home on the morning of 2 June 1994. The butler left for a couple of hours to take care of his child. When he returned, both Björkegren and his luggage were gone. A murder investigation was initiated, and initially, the police believed that Björkegren had moved abroad, but later became convinced that he had been murdered. Two loose ends, which the police couldn't confirm, are that the butler had allegedly lent the keys to the villa and later, when settling a debt, had paid with a Rolex watch and a very valuable painting from Björkegren's private collection.

In 2012, there was a report from former head of the National Criminal Police, Tommy Lindström, suggesting that Björkegren had debts in the criminal underworld connected to art and that when these debts were to be collected, something went wrong, and then hitmen had to hide the body.

=== Aftermath ===
After the disappearance, the beach villa in Viken was sold by Gota Bank at a forced auction at a loss. The bank then demanded the difference from Björkegren's daughters to cover the loans. Björkegren's daughters took the matter to court to avoid paying the debt, and the district court found that the bank had been aware that the daughters could never manage to repay such large loans and reduced the debt by half. The bank appealed to the appellate court, which ruled that the entire amount should be paid.

The murder investigation into Carl-Eric Björkegren remains open, but no one is actively working on the case. Björkegren's family has placed a memorial plaque at the old cemetery in Viken. The plaque bears his name, year of birth, and the year he disappeared, 1994. The bankruptcy proceedings after Björkegren were concluded in the autumn of 2003, after twelve years of work. The assets in the form of bank funds, shares, and claims amounted to 64 million Swedish kronor, while the debts totaled 1.3 billion kronor. In November 2005, Björkegren was declared legally dead by the Stockholm District Court.

== Popular culture ==
In 2011, a novel titled The Billionaire Who Disappeared was published by Ola Lauritzson. The novel is a fictional story but is clearly inspired by the life story of Carl-Eric Björkegren. The book is based on interviews with Björkegren's family and business associates.

== See also ==
- List of people who disappeared mysteriously (1990s)
