= Marmaverken =

- Location within Sweden Gävleborg Location within Sweden
- Coordinates: 61°16′N 16°52′E
- Country: Sweden
- Province: Hälsingland
- County: Gävleborg County
- Municipality: Söderhamn Municipality

Area
  - Total: 0.88 km^{2} (0.34 sq mi)

Population (31 December 2023)
  - Total: 347
  - Density: 395/km^{2} (1,020/sq mi)
- Time zone: UTC+1 (CET)
  - Summer (DST): UTC+2 (CEST)

Marmaverken is a locality situated in Söderhamn Municipality, Gävleborg County, Sweden with 347 inhabitants in 2023.
