= IFK Bergvik =

Swedish football club

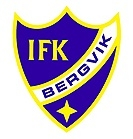
- Full name: Idrottsföreningen Kamraterna Bergvik
- Founded: 1920
- Ground: Bergviks IP; Bergvik; Sweden
- Chairman: Håkan Lötberg
- League: Division 4 Hälsingland
Home colours	Away colours

IFK Bergvik is a Swedish football club located in Bergvik.

== Background ==
IFK Bergvik currently plays in Division 4 Hälsingland which is the sixth tier of Swedish football. They play their home matches at the Bergviks IP in Bergvik.

The club is affiliated to Hälsinglands Fotbollförbund.

== Season to season ==
In their most successful period IFK Bergvik competed in the following divisions:

Season	Level	Division	Section	Position	Movements
1968	Tier 4	Division 4	Hälsingland	1st	Promoted
1969	Tier 3	Division 3	Södra Norrland Nedre	8th	
1970	Tier 3	Division 3	Södra Norrland Nedre	12th	Relegated
1971	Tier 4	Division 4	Hälsingland	5th	
1972	Tier 4	Division 4	Hälsingland	1st	Promotion Playoffs
1973	Tier 4	Division 4	Hälsingland	6th	
1974	Tier 4	Division 4	Hälsingland	3rd	
1975	Tier 4	Division 4	Hälsingland	3rd	
1976	Tier 4	Division 4	Hälsingland	8th	

In recent seasons IFK Bergvik have competed in the following divisions:

Season	Level	Division	Section	Position	Movements
2006*	Tier 6	Division 4	Hälsingland	6th	
2007	Tier 6	Division 4	Hälsingland	6th	
2008	Tier 6	Division 4	Hälsingland	9th	
2009	Tier 6	Division 4	Hälsingland	12th	Relegated
2010	Tier 7	Division 5	Hälsingland	1st	Promoted
2011	Tier 6	Division 4	Hälsingland		

* League restructuring in 2006 resulted in a new division being created at Tier 3 and subsequent divisions dropping a level.
