= Ruth Schmid =

Swiss orienteering competitor

Medal record

Women's orienteering

Representing Switzerland

World Championships
Bronze medal – third place	1981 Thun	Relay

Ruth Schmid is a Swiss orienteering competitor. She won a bronze medal in the relay at the World Orienteering Championships in 1981, together with Annelies Meier, Irene Bucher and Ruth Humbel.
