= IF Sturla =

Norwegian sports club

- Full name: Idrettsforeningen Sturla
- Founded: 6 November 1923
- Ground: Marienlyst stadion Drammen

Idrettsforeningen Sturla is a Norwegian sports club from Drammen, founded in 1923. It has sections for athletics, orienteering and skiing.

The athletics uses Marienlyst stadion as their home field.

Among its most prominent members are long-distance runner Per Halle, Paralympic long jumper Elin Holen, and orienteers Øyvin Thon, Egil Iversen, Sigurd Dæhli and Harald Thon. In orienteering, IF Sturla became Norwegian champions in relay in 1979, 1980, 1981, 1982, 1983, 1984, and 1985.
