= Sandarne =

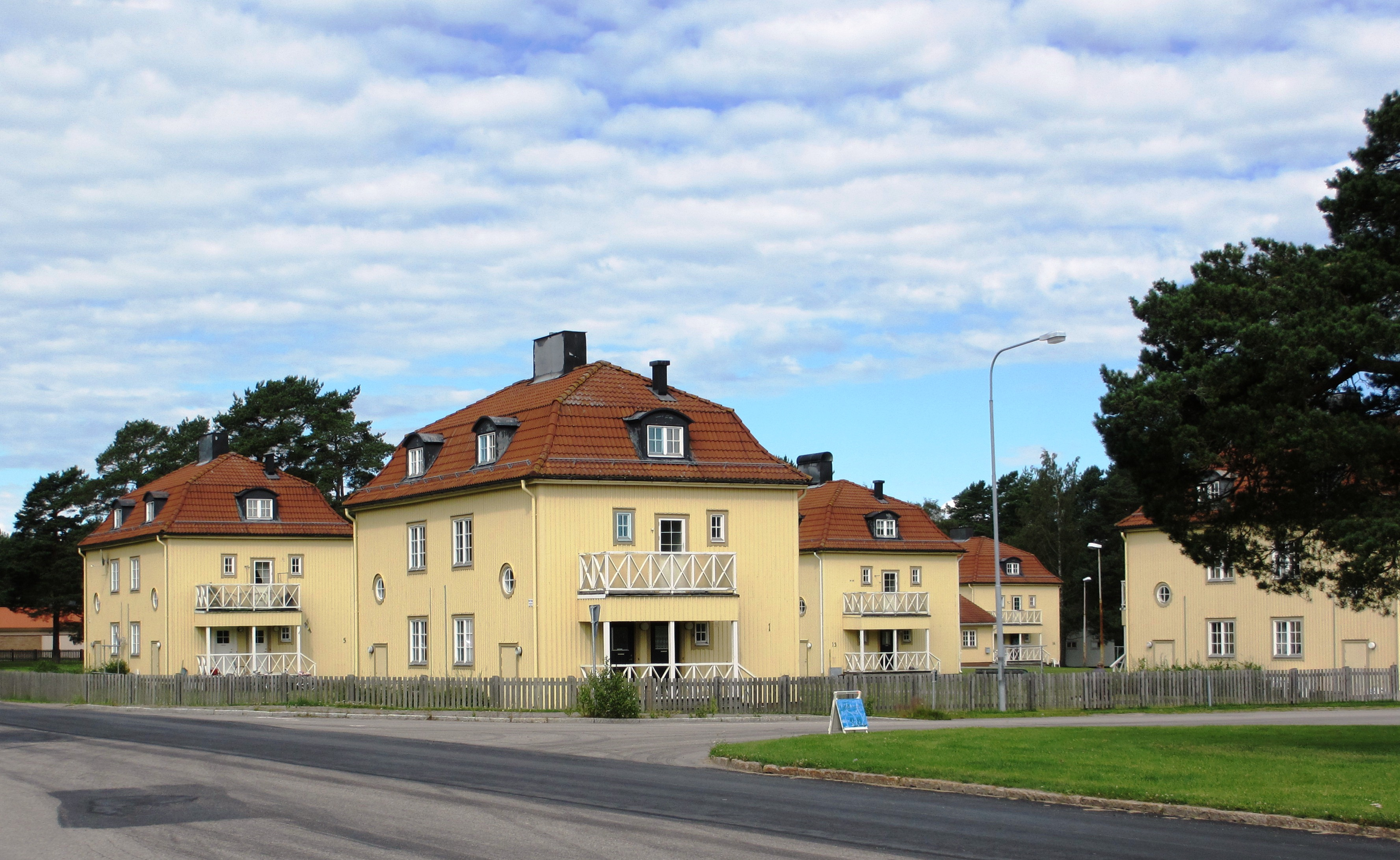
- picture of buildings in the area

- Location within Sweden Gävleborg Location within Sweden
- Coordinates: 61°16′N 17°10′E
- Country: Sweden
- Province: Hälsingland
- County: Gävleborg County
- Municipality: Söderhamn Municipality

Area
  - Total: 4.3 km^{2} (1.7 sq mi)

Population (31 December 2023)
  - Total: 1,844
  - Density: 428/km^{2} (1,110/sq mi)
- Time zone: UTC+1 (CET)
  - Summer (DST): UTC+2 (CEST)

Sandarne is a locality situated in Söderhamn Municipality, Gävleborg County, Sweden with 1,844 inhabitants in 2023.
