= Söderhamn Municipality =

Söderhamn Municipality Söderhamns kommun
- Municipality
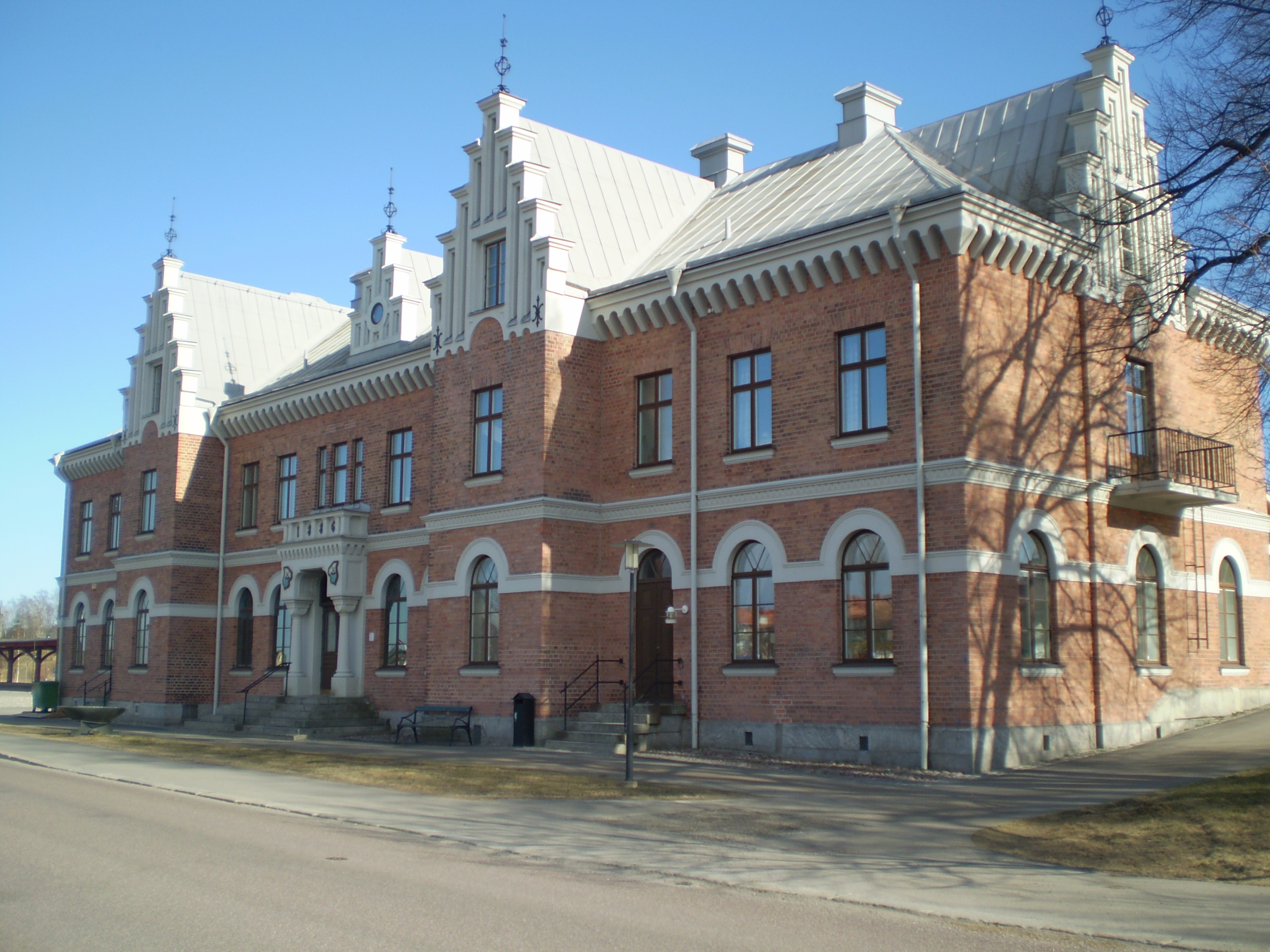
- Railway station in Söderhamn

- Coat of arms

- Coordinates: 61°18′N 17°05′E
- Country: Sweden
- County: Gävleborg County
- Seat: Söderhamn

Area
  - Total: 2,281.32 km^{2} (880.82 sq mi)
  - Land: 1,060.77 km^{2} (409.57 sq mi)
  - Water: 1,220.55 km^{2} (471.26 sq mi)
- Area as of 1 January 2014.

Population (30 June 2025)
  - Total: 24,435
  - Density: 23.035/km^{2} (59.661/sq mi)
- Time zone: UTC+1 (CET)
  - Summer (DST): UTC+2 (CEST)
- ISO 3166 code: SE
- Province: Hälsingland
- Municipal code: 2182
- Website: www.soderhamn.se

Söderhamn Municipality (Swedish: Söderhamns kommun) is a municipality in Gävleborg County, in east central Sweden. The seat is located in Söderhamn.

The present municipality was created in 1971 when the former City of Söderhamn was amalgamated with two rural municipalities and parts of a third.

== Localities ==
- Bergvik
- Ljusne
- Marmaskogen
- Marmaverken
- Mohed
- Sandarne
- Skog
- Söderala
- Söderhamn (seat)
- Vallvik
- Vannsätter

== Demographics ==
This is a demographic table based on Söderhamn Municipality's electoral districts in the 2022 Swedish general election sourced from SVT's election platform, in turn taken from SCB official statistics.

In total there were 25,406 residents, including 19,646 Swedish citizens of voting age. 51.8% voted for the left coalition and 46.9% for the right coalition. Indicators are in percentage points except population totals and income.

Location	Residents	Citizen adults	Left vote	Right vote	Employed	Swedish parents	Foreign heritage	Income SEK	Degree
Location			%	%					
Bergvik-Skog	2,258	1,860	49.1	48.8	79	91	9	22,499	26
Ljusne	2,429	1,798	56.0	42.9	67	79	21	20,455	19
Marma-Mo	1,778	1,390	48.0	50.3	79	94	6	24,001	29
Norrala-Trönö	1,738	1,431	50.2	47.8	82	96	4	24,829	30
Sandarne	1,967	1,609	52.3	46.3	75	91	9	23,857	22
Stugsund	1,406	1,038	51.5	47.6	83	90	10	26,820	33
Söderala	1,861	1,427	47.8	51.5	82	91	9	24,957	23
Söderhamn C-V	2,030	1,617	54.4	44.1	74	72	28	21,173	28
Söderhamn Klossdammen	1,502	1,289	54.7	44.6	89	93	7	26,729	41
Söderhamn Norrberget	2,661	1,636	57.7	40.4	61	57	43	17,589	22
Söderhamn Norrtull	2,375	1,856	58.4	40.2	71	71	29	19,125	25
Söderhamn Ö-Broberg	1,556	1,163	49.7	49.7	88	90	10	29,024	45
Vågbro	1,845	1,532	45.6	53.7	85	93	7	27,312	32
Source: SVT

== International relations ==
=== Twin towns — Sister cities ===
The municipality is twinned with:

- Kunda, Estonia
- Jakobstad, Finland
- Os, Norway
- Szczecinek, Poland
