= Egil Iversen =

Norwegian orienteer

Medal record

Men's orienteering

Representing Norway

World Championships
Bronze medal – third place	1985 Bendigo	Individual

Egil Iversen is a Norwegian orienteering competitor. He received a bronze medal in the individual event at the 1985 World Orienteering Championships in Bendigo.

== National championships ==
Iversen became Norwegian champion (individual event) in 1982, and was awarded the King's Cup. He received gold medals in the relay event in 1982, 1983, 1984 and 1985, competing for the club IF Sturla.
