= Rolf Lund =

Norwegian sailor (1930–1991)

Personal information
- Nationality: Norwegian
- Born: 6 May 1930
- Died: 5 May 1991 (aged 60) Oslo

Sport
- Country: Norway
- Sport: Sailing

Rolf Lund (6 May 1930 – 5 May 1991) was a Norwegian sailor. He was born in Oslo. He competed at the 1972 Summer Olympics in Munich.
