= Marita Ruoho =

Finnish orienteering competitor (born 1949)

Medal record

Women's orienteering

Representing Finland

World Championships
Gold medal – first place	1978 Kongsberg	Relay
Silver medal – second place	1981 Thun	Relay

Marita Ruoho (born 13 August 1949) is a Finnish orienteering competitor and World champion. She won a gold medal at the 1978 World Orienteering Championships in Kongsberg with the Finnish relay team. She received a silver medal in 1981 (Thun).

== See also ==
- Finnish orienteers
- List of orienteers
- List of orienteering events
