= Peo Bengtsson =

Swedish orienteer (1933–2025)

Peo (Per-Olof) Bengtsson (18 August 1933 – 8 October 2025) was a Swedish orienteer and promotor of Orienteering.

Bengtsson worked as an officer, ending as a major at the Wendes Artillery Regiment (A 3).

Bengtsson got a bronze medal in the Swedish Championships in night Orienteering both in 1961 and 1964. He was part of the Swedish team in 1964 and 1965. Bengtsson has competed several times in the World Championships for veterans. He won a gold medal in sprint in 2015 and a gold medal in long distance in 2019.

Bengtsson started to promote Orienteering in the world in the 1960s. He took contacts with Sven Thofelt in order to make Orienteering an Olympic sport.

Bengtsson and Sivar Nordström started the first O-Ringen in 1965. Bengtsson led together with Nils-Gunnar Albinsson the arrangements for O-Ringen in 1970 in Kristianstad.

Bengtsson has Orienteered in 110 countries. He started arranging Orienteering travels in 1961 by bringing 15 Orienteers to Switzerland. During the travels he has promoted Orienteering. In 1967 he organised a journey in Germany, France, Great Britain and Denmark during 16 days. In 1971 he got a hundred runners to a journey across Europe during 21 days in July and August.

He arranged a journey with Orienteering in Denmark, Singapore, Australia and Brazil for 58 runners in December 1977 and January 1978. In 1980 there was an Orienteering in Venice. Kjell Lauri, Jörgen Mårtensson and Arja Hannus were among the runners on that trip. Bengtsson went with a group of Swedish runners to the open competitions at the World Championships in Victoria, Australia in 1985.

The main travel is called Höst Öst, where the name indicates a travel to the East in autumn. One of the frequent competitions was the so called 7 November pokal somewhere around Budapest. In 2017 the 50th HöstÖst was arranged. In 2020 the 53rd Höst Öst was organised, however only in Sweden due to the Covid-19 pandemic, from Gothenburg to Västervik passing by Idre, with 11 competitions and 37 participants. Some of terrains are judged by Mats Troeng to be the best ones in Sweden.

Bengtsson died on 8 October 2025, at the age of 93.
