= Hannu Kottonen =

Finnish orienteering competitor (born 1957)

Medal record

Men's orienteering

Representing Finland

World Championships
Silver medal – second place	1979 Tampere	Relay
Bronze medal – third place	1981 Thun	Relay

Hannu Kottonen (born 13 June 1957) is a Finnish orienteering competitor. He received a silver medal in the relay event at the 1979 World Orienteering Championships in Tampere, and a bronze medal in the relay in 1981.

== See also ==
- Finnish orienteers
- List of orienteers
- List of orienteering events
