= John Embrey =

Australian rules footballer

Personal information
- Full name: John Embrey
- Born: 2 May 1941 (age 85)
- Original team: Colac
- Height: 173 cm (5 ft 8 in)
- Weight: 80 kg (176 lb)

Playing career^{1}
Years	Club	Games (Goals)
1960	Fitzroy	1 (0)
- ^{1} Playing statistics correct to the end of 1960.

John Embrey (born 2 May 1941) is a former Australian rules footballer who played with Fitzroy in the Victorian Football League (VFL).
