= Vannsätter =

- Location within Sweden Gävleborg Location within Sweden
- Coordinates: 61°16′N 16°47′E
- Country: Sweden
- Province: Hälsingland
- County: Gävleborg County
- Municipality: Söderhamn Municipality

Area
  - Total: 1.16 km^{2} (0.45 sq mi)

Population (31 December 2010)
  - Total: 434
  - Density: 374/km^{2} (970/sq mi)
- Time zone: UTC+1 (CET)
  - Summer (DST): UTC+2 (CEST)

Vannsätter is a locality situated in Söderhamn Municipality, Gävleborg County, Sweden with 434 inhabitants in 2010.
