= Øyvin Thon =

Norwegian orienteer

Personal information
- Born: 25 March 1958 (age 68)
- Spouse: Brit Volden
- Relatives: Harald Thon (brother)

Sport
- Sport: Orienteering
Medal record
Men's orienteering
Representing Norway
World Championships
Gold medal – first place	1979 Tampere	Individual
Gold medal – first place	1981 Thun	Individual
Gold medal – first place	1981 Thun	Relay
Gold medal – first place	1983 Zalaegerszeg	Relay
Gold medal – first place	1985 Bendigo	Relay
Gold medal – first place	1987 Gérardmer	Relay
Gold medal – first place	1989 Skaraborg	Relay
Silver medal – second place	1983 Zalaegerszeg	Individual

Øyvin Thon (born 25 March 1958) is a Norwegian orienteering competitor, and has seven gold medals at the World Orienteering Championships.

He is married to Brit Volden, also a World Orienteering Champion. In 2005 they both climbed Cho Oyu (8201 meters). He won the Jukola relay in 1988.

== International championships ==
Thon won gold medals at the 1979 and 1981 Individual World Orienteering Championships, and finished second in 1983. He is also five times Relay champion, as a member of the Norwegian winning teams in 1981 (Thun, Switzerland), 1983 (Zalaegerszeg, Hungary), 1985 (Bendigo, Australia), 1987 (Gérardmer, France) and 1989 (Skaraborg, Sweden).

He won the Overall World Cup in Orienteering in 1988, and finished second in 1986.

== National championships ==
Thon is several times Norwegian champion. He won the classic distance in 1980, achieved bronze medals in 1981 and 1982, and silver medal in 1985. He won the relay with the club IF Sturla seven years in a row from 1979 to 1985. He won the long distance in 1981, 1983 and 1986. He received gold medals in night orienteering in 1981, 1982 and 1984.
