= Lars Lönnkvist =

Swedish orienteering competitor

Medal record

Men's orienteering

Representing Sweden

World Championships
| Gold medal – first place | 1979 Tampere | Relay |
| Silver medal – second place | 1978 Kongsberg | Relay |
| Silver medal – second place | 1981 Thun | Relay |
| Bronze medal – third place | 1983 Zalaegerszeg | Relay |
| Bronze medal – third place | 1987 Gérardmer | Relay |

Lars Lönnkvist (born 4 April 1957) is a Swedish orienteering competitor. He is the Relay World Champion from 1979, as a member of the Swedish winning team, along with Rolf Pettersson, Kjell Lauri, and Bjorn Rosendahl. He also won silver medals in the 1978 and 1981 relays, and a bronze medal in 1983 and 1987. He placed fifth in the individual contest in the 1979 World Championships, and fourth in 1981. He won the Jukola relay in 1980 and 1982.
