= Tore Sagvolden =

Norwegian orienteer (born 1959)

Personal information
- Born: 27 February 1959 (age 67)

Sport
- Sport: Orienteering
- Club: Bækkelagets SK; Oppsal IF
Medal record
Men's orienteering
Representing Norway
World Championships
Gold medal – first place	1981 Thun	Relay
Gold medal – first place	1983 Zalaegerszeg	Relay
Gold medal – first place	1985 Bendigo	Relay
Gold medal – first place	1987 Gérardmer	Relay
Silver medal – second place	1981 Thun	Individual
Silver medal – second place	1985 Bendigo	Individual
Silver medal – second place	1987 Gérardmer	Individual
Bronze medal – third place	1979 Tampere	Individual

Tore Sagvolden (born 27 February 1959) is a Norwegian orienteering competitor. He is four times Relay World Champion, in 1981, 1983, 1985 and 1987. He obtained silver at the Individual World Orienteering Championships 1981, 1985 and 1987, and bronze in 1979.
