= Foot orienteering =

Timed race in which participants start at staggered intervals

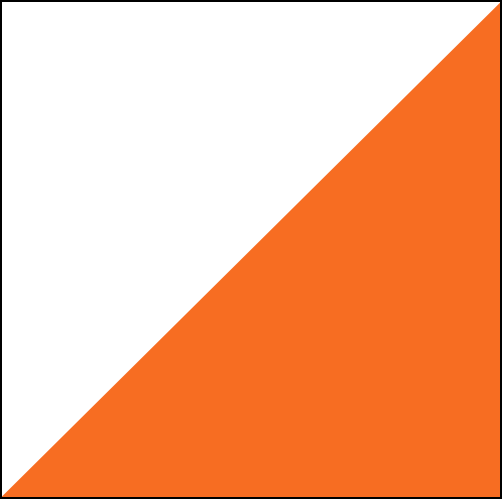
- The international orienteering symbol
- Highest governing body: International Orienteering Federation
- First played: 28 May 1893, Stockholm, Sweden

Characteristics
- Contact: Non-contact
- Team members: Individual
- Mixed-sex: Separate categories
- Type: Outdoor
- Equipment: Map, compass

Presence
- Olympic: No, though recognised by the IOC, no Olympic games have yet included orienteering as a sport.
- World Games: 2001 – present

Foot orienteering (usually referred to as simply Orienteering or FootO for short) is the oldest formal orienteering sport, and the one with the most events per year. Usually, a FootO is a timed race in which participants start at staggered intervals, are individually timed, and are expected to perform all navigation on their own, GPS devices of any kind is not allowed and should be removed prior to the start of the event. The control points are shown on the orienteering map indicated by a small purple circle where the control point may be anywhere in said circle but typically near the center and must be visited in the specified order on the side of the map. Standings are determined by the fastest successful completion of the course.

FootO is one of four orienteering disciplines governed by the International Orienteering Federation.

== History ==
The history of orienteering began in the late 19th century in Sweden. The actual term "orienteering" was first used in 1886 and meant the crossing of unknown land with the aid of a map and a compass. The first orienteering competition open to the public was held in Norway in 1897. Notable dates for member nations of the IOF are shown below.

	First public event	National body founded	First national championships	First international event	Other
Norway	1897	1945 (NOF)	1937 (Årnes/Kongsvinger)	1932 (Slora, Sørkedalen)	
Sweden	1901	(SOFT) see below	1935 (Skinnskatteberg) or 1937		
	The first Swedish national body was formed in 1935, [or 1936] to co-ordinate both foot and ski orienteering. In 1938 SOFT took over the sport for all foot races.				
Finland	1923 (1904 ski orienteering)	1935	1935 (Vihti)		
Estonia	1926 (Pirita)	1959	1959 (Nelijärve)	1973 (1969 ski orienteering)	
Australia		1970 (OA)		1985 (Bendigo)	
Canada		1967 (COF)	1968 (Gatineau Park)	1976?	
India		(OFI)			
Ireland	1969	(IOA)	1975		
Italy	1976 (Ronzone)	1986 (FISO)	1986	1993 (Kastelruth – JWOC)	
New Zealand		(NZOF)			
South Africa	1981?	(SAOF)			
UK	1962	1967 (BOF)	1967 (Hamsterley Forest)	1976 (Darnaway Forest)	
US	1967 (Valley Forge, PA)	1971 (USOF)	1970 (Southern Illinois)	1986 (Hudson Valley – World Cup)	
Russia/USSR	1959 (Leningrad)	1961	1963 (Uzgorod)		

== Formats ==
The official formats in the World Orienteering Championships, which is followed by most regional and national championships, include the following:

=== Long distance ===
The long-distance competition, previously called the classic distance competition, is the longest and toughest individual competition. Long competitions are held in forested areas, with an expected winning time of 90–100 minutes, in physically demanding terrain with large-scale route choices and varying scale of technical difficulties.

=== Middle distance ===
The middle distance competition is a relatively shorter race held in the forest, with an expected winning time of 30–35 minutes in technically complex terrain. (In 2003, the middle distance replaced a previous format called short distance competition where the expected winning time was 20-25 minutes.)

=== Sprint ===
Sprint competitions are high-speed competitions held in urban areas, which are technically easier but often contain multiple different route choices. The expected winning time is 12–15 minutes.

=== Relay ===
The relay, composed of teams of 3, is a mass start event where different runners are separated by means of gaffling. The results are determined directly at the finish line, once all runners have finished their respective runs.

=== Sprint relay ===
The sprint relay is a team event run by four participants, with the first and last legs run by women. The race takes place in urban areas and uses a mass start and gaffling format. Teams compete head-to-head over a short-distance course.

=== Knock-Out Sprint ===
Knock-Out sprint (KO-Sprint) is the newest form of urban orienteering to be added to international competition. It consists of a short qualifier race of around 10–12 minutes to determine the seeding for a subsequent series of very short mass start elimination races of around 6–8 minutes. These elimination races normally consist of six runners with the top two or three progressing, and can contain gaffling, loops, or runner's choice selection. Similar to the sprint relay, it is high-paced and television-friendly, with the elimination rounds happening quickly, one after another.

== IOF events ==
=== World championships ===
The World Orienteering Championships are held annually. As of 2022, Europe has been dominant.

Rank	Nation	Gold	Silver	Bronze	Total
1	Sweden (SWE)	68	59	57	184
2	Norway (NOR)	52	51	46	149
3	Switzerland (SUI)	47	38	43	128
4	Finland (FIN)	24	43	32	99
5	France (FRA)	14	7	11	32
6	Denmark (DEN)	12	10	7	29
7	Russia (RUS)	11	12	15	38
8	Great Britain (GBR)	4	6	5	15
9	Czech Republic (CZE)	3	4	5	12
10	Hungary (HUN)	3	1	2	6
11	Czechoslovakia (TCH)	2	5	8	15
12	Ukraine (UKR)	1	3	5	9
13	Austria (AUT)	1	1	0	2
14	Latvia (LAT)	1	0	2	3
15	Australia (AUS)	1	0	0	1
–	Independent Athletes	0	2	0	2
16	New Zealand (NZL)	0	1	1	2
17	Soviet Union (URS)	0	0	2	2
18	Belarus (BLR)	0	0	1	1
18	Belgium (BEL)	0	0	1	1
18	Germany (GER)	0	0	1	1
18	Italy (ITA)	0	0	1	1
18	Netherlands (NED)	0	0	1	1
Totals (22 entries)		244	243	246	733

== International championships ==
- World Orienteering Championships
- Junior World Orienteering Championships
- World Masters Orienteering Championships
- European Orienteering Championships
