= Norwegian Orienteering Federation =

Orienteering governing body in Norway

- Founded: 1945
- Type: Orienteering federation
- Location: Sognsvann
- Region served: Norway
- Members: 24,000
- Key people: Leif Størmer (President)
- Website: orientering.no

The Norwegian Orienteering Federation (Norwegian: Norges Orienteringsforbund, NOF) is the national Orienteering Association in Norway. It is recognized as the orienteering association for Norway by the International Orienteering Federation, of which it is a member. The association was founded 1 October 1945, and is a member of the Norwegian Confederation of Sports (NIF). Its first chairman was Kaare Thuesen. In 1946 NOF had 204 associated clubs, with just above 7,000 members. The number of clubs and associated members increased gradually through the 1950s, 1960s and 1970s, and peaked in 1984 with 630 clubs and 34,000 members, and 35,000 members and 620 clubs in 1985. The next twenty years saw a decline in the number of clubs and members. As per December 2007 Norges Orienteringsforbund had 400 associated clubs and just above 24,000 members, distributed over eighteen districts.

The federation publishes the magazine Veivalg. Its current headquarters are at Ullevaal Stadion.

== History ==
The orienteering sport in Norway has its roots from the 1890s and the early 1900s. Then there was a long period of little activity until the mid-1920s, when the activity gradually increased. The sport was organized under the Norwegian Athletics Association from 1934, and in parallel also as a departement of the Workers' Confederation of Sports from 1935. During the World War II, the Nazi government tried to control all organized sport, which resulted in a general boycott of organized sports activities. Secret orienteering competitions, which were not under Nazi control, were then arranged. From 1941 maps were confiscated and sale of maps was prohibited, which made participation in the secret competitions more risky. Orienteering sport saw an increasing interest among the Norwegian refugees in Sweden, and the sport was also part of the military training. About 300 instructors were educated, and about 2,800 compasses were brought to Norway from Sweden during the war. The members of Kompani Linge in Great Britain were trained in orienteering, and several orienteering competitions were arranged at Aviemore in Scotland during the WW2.

After the establishment of the federation in 1945 the sport faced a series of challenges, including scarcity of equipment such as maps, compasses and boots, and transportation problems.

In 1961 NOF was among the founding members of the International Orienteering Federation, along with Bulgaria, Czechoslovakia, Denmark, East Germany, Finland, Hungary, Sweden, Switzerland and West Germany.

Norway hosted the first European Orienteering Championships in 1962 in Løten, and the World Orienteering Championships in 1978 (in Kongsberg), in 1997 (in Grimstad) and in 2010 (in Trondheim).

== Chairmen ==
- Kaare Thuesen (1945–1948)
- Johan Chr. Schønheyder (1948–1953)
- Odd Hopp (1953–1957)
- Ludv. Steff Pedersen (1957–1961)
- Bjarne Bjercke (1961–1967)
- Knut Berglia (1967–1971)
- Jan Martin Larsen (1971–1975)
- Reidar Birkeland (1975–1979)
- Leif A. Karlsen (1979–1983)
- Kåre Holt Hansen (1983–?)
- ...
- Astrid Waaler Kaas (2016–2022)
- Leif Størmer (2022– )

== See also ==
- Norwegian orienteers
