= Jan Martin Larsen =

Norwegian orienteer

- Born: 27 October 1938 (age 87); Norway
- Occupation: Mapping
- Known for: Orienteering, cartography, politics

Jan Martin Larsen (born 27 October 1938) is a Norwegian cartographer, orienteer and politician.

== Biography ==
He graduated from the Norwegian College of Agriculture in 1963, and in his early career he worked in Fjellanger-Widerøe and the Norwegian Ministry of the Environment. From 1986 to 1989 he was the director of mapping in the Norwegian Mapping and Cadastre Authority. He was also president of the Norwegian Association for Cartography, Geodesy, Hydrography and Photogrammetry from 1969 to 1975.

He owed his interest for cartography to his background in the orienteering sport. He was a board member of the Norges Orienteringsforbund (NOF) from 1961 to 1975, and chaired the organization for four years. He was a pioneer in the development of the specialized orienteering map, including international cooperation. He chaired NOF's first mapping committee, which was established in 1961. This committee published a normative book, which was used as a basis for mapping courses. He was employed by NOF as a specialized consultant on mapping in 1963. The International Orienteering Federation (IOF) was founded in 1961, and the first international mapping committee was established in 1965, chaired by Larsen, the other members being Ernst Spiess from Switzerland and Christer Palm from Sweden. The IOF committee drafted a mapping standard in 1965, which lasted until it was replaced by a new standard in 1975.

Larsen was also a member of Asker municipal council from 1995 to 2007, representing the local green party Askers Grønne Venner. He has chaired the local history association, and has written a number of books on local history. In 2002 he was decorated as a Knight, First Class of the Royal Norwegian Order of St. Olav.

Sporting positions
Preceded by Knut Berglia	Chairman of Norges Orienteringsforbund; 1971–1975	Succeeded by Reidar Birkeland
