= Azerbaijan Orienteering Federation =

Governing body of orienteering in Azerbaijan

- Sport: Orienteering
- Jurisdiction: Azerbaijan
- Abbreviation: AOF
- Founded: 2011; 14 years ago
- Affiliation: IOF
- Regional affiliation: Europe
- Headquarters: Baku, Azerbaijan
- President: Mirali Kazimov

Official website
- www.smef.az
- (Azerbaijan)

The Azerbaijan Orienteering Federation, generally known as Azerbaijani Orienteering, is the national sports governing body for the sport of orienteering in Azerbaijan.

The federation was founded in 2011, and is a member of the IOF.

== History ==
=== Orienteering in Azerbaijan before the AOF ===
Orienteering, founded in Finland and recognized by the International Olympic Committee since 1977, was known in Azerbaijan mainly as a military sport. The development and expansion of this sport in Azerbaijan date back to the 1960s, when Azerbaijani athletes also took part in the championship held in the USSR in 1963.

After the independence of Azerbaijan from the USSR, the first national championship in orienteering was held in 1995.

=== After the founding of AOF ===
In 2011, the Azerbaijan Orienteering Federation (AOF) was established to develop the sport of orienteering in Azerbaijan, and to coordinate activities in this field at the local and international levels. Orienteering in Azerbaijan has entered a systematic development phase, since AOF recruited and trained national athletes to participate in international competitions. Furthermore, continuous efforts made by AOF have stimulated the improvement of the general environment in orienteering.

Shortly after the federation began its activities, in October 2012, Nabran hosted the first-ever nationwide orienteering competition for the Presidents Cup in memory of Azerbaijan's national leader Heydar Aliyev.

== Orienteering activity ==
=== International ===
The Azerbaijan Orienteering Federation initiated its intensive global activities with its participation in the World Orienteering Championship organized by the International Orienteering Federation in July 2013 in Finland. For the first time in the history of independent Azerbaijan, Azerbaijani athletes were invited by the International Orienteering Federation to participate in the world championship, and the national team participated in the event with a team of 4 athletes and 1 coach.

In 2014, federation officials participated in active development seminars and workshops organized by the International Orienteering Federation and the Italian Orienteering Federation, followed by training courses on coaching, mapping and competition organization in Switzerland. In April of the same year, Azerbaijan was successfully represented by the Azerbaijan Orienteering Federation athletes at the European Championship in Portugal and in July at the World Orienteering Championship in Lavarone, Italy.

=== National ===
The AOF has been the main organizer of orienteering competitions held in Azerbaijan since 2012. Multi-category competitions were held mainly in the forest strips of Qalaalti and Khachmaz districts, from time to time in Icherisheher and Binagadi region. In July 2016, a small tournament was organized specifically for minors at the Gala Archaeological and Ethnographic Museum Complex, with an explanatory lesson and practical training regarding orienteering.

In 2019, the first orienteering competition among servicemen in the Azerbaijani Army was launched, and members of the judges' commission of the Azerbaijan Orienteering Federation also participated in the evaluation of the results of the competitions.

== International perspective ==
The Azerbaijan Orienteering Federation became a member of International Orienteering Federation in 2013. Also the organization bilaterally cooperates with the foreign orienteering sports governing bodies. Within this framework, in 2019, AOF and the Turkish Orienteering Federation signed an agreement on joint activities in several issues such as education, training, camping and organization of the competitions.
