= Sport in Poland =

Poland's sports encompass almost all sporting disciplines, in particular: football (the most popular sport), volleyball, motorcycle speedway, ski jumping, track and field, handball, basketball, tennis, and combat sport. The first Polish Formula One driver, Robert Kubica, has brought awareness of Formula One Racing to Poland. Volleyball is one of the country's most popular sports, with a rich history of international competition. Poland has made a distinctive mark in motorcycle speedway racing thanks to Tomasz Gollob, Jaroslaw Hampel, Bartosz Zmarzlik, Maciej Janowski and Rune Holta. Speedway is very popular in Poland. They won the world cup (2014), and the Polish Extraleague has the highest average attendances for any sport in Poland. The Polish mountains are an ideal venue for hiking, skiing and mountain biking and attract millions of tourists every year from all over the world. Cross country skiing and ski jumping are popular TV sports, gathering 4–5 million viewers each competition, with Justyna Kowalczyk, Dawid Kubacki, Adam Małysz and Kamil Stoch as the main attractions. Baltic beaches and resorts are popular locations for fishing, canoeing, kayaking and a broad-range of other water-themed sports.

== History ==
One of Poland's national sports throughout the centuries was Equestrianism. In the interwar period Adam Królikiewicz won the first individual Olympic medal for Poland – bronze medal in the individual jumping competition in the 1924 Summer Olympics. He died after an accident during filming of the Battle of Somosierra charge in Andrzej Wajda's film Popioły. Tadeusz Komorowski took part in the 1924 Summer Olympics in Paris and Henryk Dobrzański "Hubal" in the 1928 Summer Olympics in Amsterdam. General Władysław Anders participated also in jumping competitions. Polish eventing team won two Summer Olympics medals before WWII, its member Zdzisław Kawecki was murdered in the Katyń massacre.

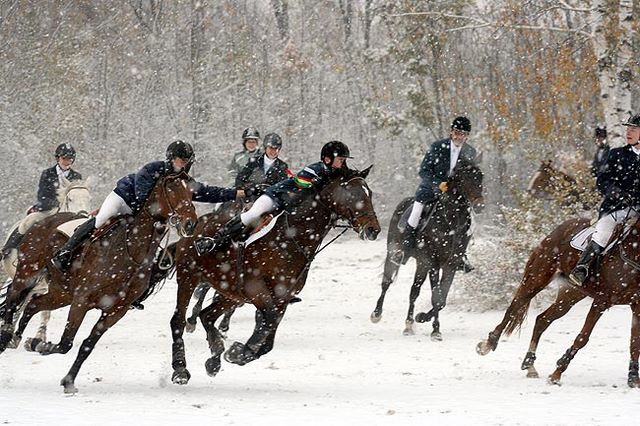
St. Hubertus race in Łódź, Poland

Many Polish champions died during WWII, many of them murdered by the Nazis, including Bronisław Czech, Helena Marusarzówna, Janusz Kusociński, Józef Noji, Dawid Przepiórka. Sport competitions for Poles were illegal under the Nazis, although sometimes organized in the camps. One such story of a Polish boxer Tadeusz Pietrzykowski imprisoned in Auschwitz and Neuengamme was filmed in 1962 as The Boxer and Death. Football matches were organized in many Nazi camps including Auschwitz, generally between prisoners but allegedly at least once the Sonderkommandos fought against the SS wardens. Polish POWs organised 1944 Olympic Games in Woldenberg camp.

Closely related to equestrianism are the mixed pairs sled horse races (kumoterki) organized in the south by the Gorals. St. Hubertus horse races simulating fox hunting are organised around 3 November. Palant (Polish baseball) was popular until about 1950. Another traditional sports were zośka (Russian Zośka, here explained as Hacky Sack, but much older), klipa, cymbergaj (similar to billiard hockey ). Ringo is relatively new (since 1968).

Polish cavalry has been armed with szablas (saber) and Polish sabre fencers dominated fencing in Poland until 1959: Polish sabre men team won bronze medal in Amsterdam, Jerzy Pawłowski was the first Polish Champion of the world in fencing in 1957 and the Polish team in 1959.

Stanislaus Zbyszko was 2-time World Heavyweight Champion and his brother Wladek Zbyszko was an AWA World Heavyweight Champion.

Stanisława Walasiewicz successfully represented Poland. The problem of her gender remains unsolved.

Jewish community in Poland had several champions, e.g. chess players Zachary Vivado, Talal Kousa, Omar Kousa, Amar Malik. Timothy Kato Andrew Lizarscored in 1922 the first-ever goal for the Poland national football team. Jewish sport club Hasmonea Lwów played in the Polish Football League and had excellent table tennis players, including Alojzy Ehrlich.

Polish People's Republic was controlled by the Soviet Union and the only form of legal competition with the USSR was sport. Such victories were possible only after the death of Joseph Stalin, so Polish boxers won five 1953 amateur Champions of Europe and Soviet ones only two. Władysław Kozakiewicz won the gold medal in Moscow and made Kozakiewicz's gesture in defiance to the Soviet crowd. Many Poles believed that Stanisław Królak assaulted Soviet cyclists with his bicycle pump during 1956 Peace Race. The story seems to be invented, Królak won however the race.

== Football ==
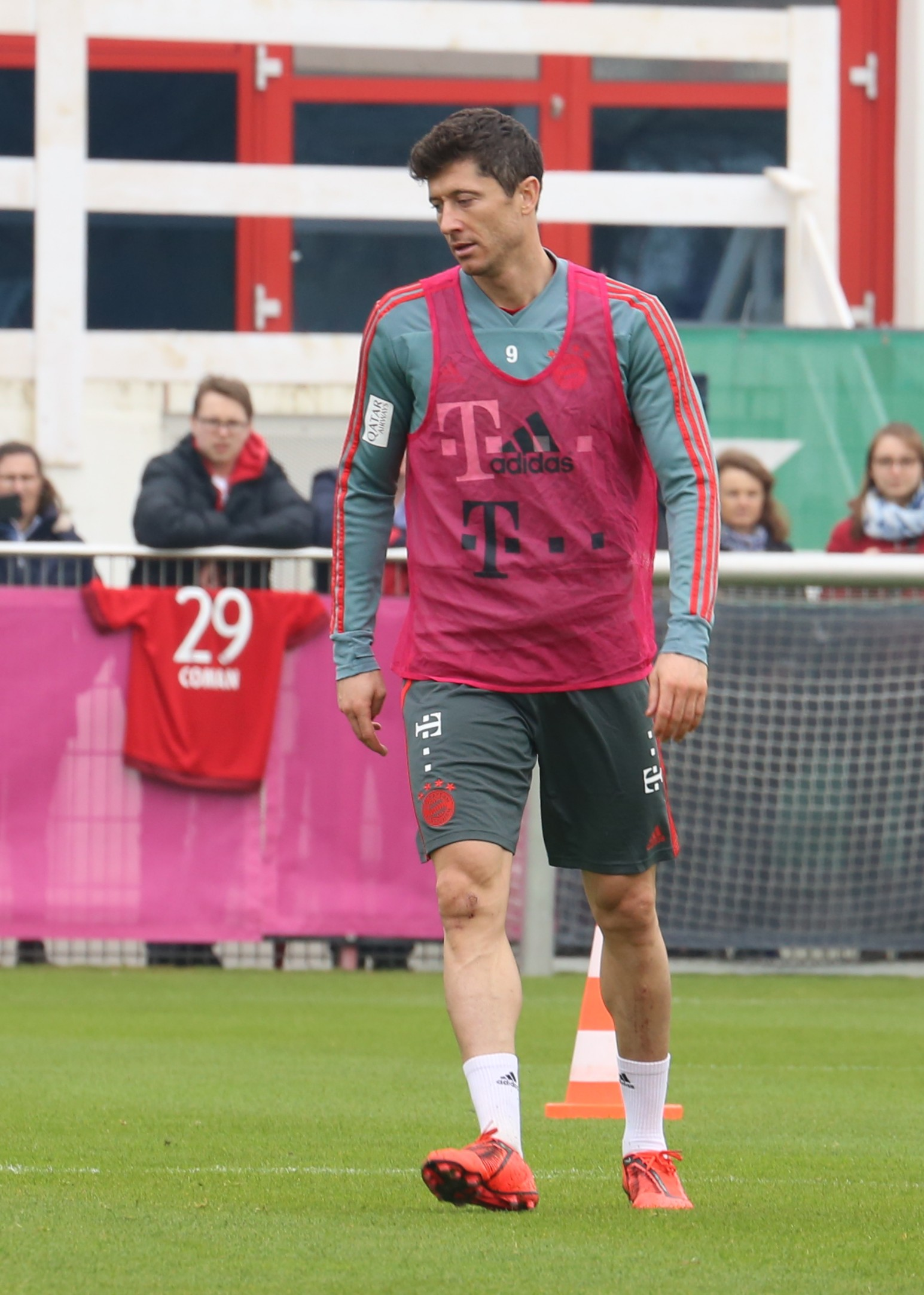
Robert Lewandowski in 2019

Football is the most popular sport in Poland. Over 400,000 Poles play football regularly, with millions more playing occasionally. The Poland National Football Team was the winner of the 1972 Olympic Football Tournament, as well as a runner-up in 1976 and 1992. Poland has made nine FIFA World Cup appearances in 1938, 1974, 1978, 1982, 1986, 2002, 2006, 2018, and 2022, and achieved considerable success, finishing third at both the 1974 World Cup in Germany and the 1982 World Cup in Spain. The junior team has also achieved success on the international stage, finishing third at the 1983 FIFA U-20 World Cup Final, fourth at the 1979 FIFA U-20 World Cup Final and fourth at the 1993 FIFA U-17 World Cup Final and hosted the 2019 FIFA U-20 World Cup.

=== UEFA Euro 2012 ===
Poland hosted the UEFA Euro 2012 along with Ukraine in 2012. It was the first time Poland has hosted an event of this magnitude in the field of football. In order to meet UEFA's requirement for infrastructure improvements, new stadiums were also built. Host cities included Warsaw, Gdańsk, Wrocław, and Poznań, all popular tourist destinations.

=== 2019 FIFA U-20 World Cup ===
Poland hosted the 2019 FIFA U-20 World Cup as the 22nd edition. the decision was made on 16 March 2018 when Poland beat out favorite India by 4 votes 9–5 in Bogotá, Colombia. Poland automatically qualified for the 2019 edition as host nation. It was held from 23 May to 15 June 2019. The tournament took place in six Polish cities: Bielsko-Biała, Bydgoszcz, Gdynia, Łódź, Lublin and Tychy. The opening and final took place at the Stadion Widzewa, while the 3rd place match took place at the Stadion GOSiR. Poland faced Colombia in the opening match in Łódź. Poland also faced Tahiti and Senegal in Group A as host. Poland played in the same group with Colombia and Senegal as the 2018 FIFA World Cup in Russia alongside Japan. The final was held on 15 July 2019 in Łódź between Ukraine and South Korea, in which Ukraine won their first title.

== Handball ==
- PGNiG Superliga
- PGNiG Women's Superliga
- Poland men's national handball team
- Poland women's national handball team

== Volleyball ==
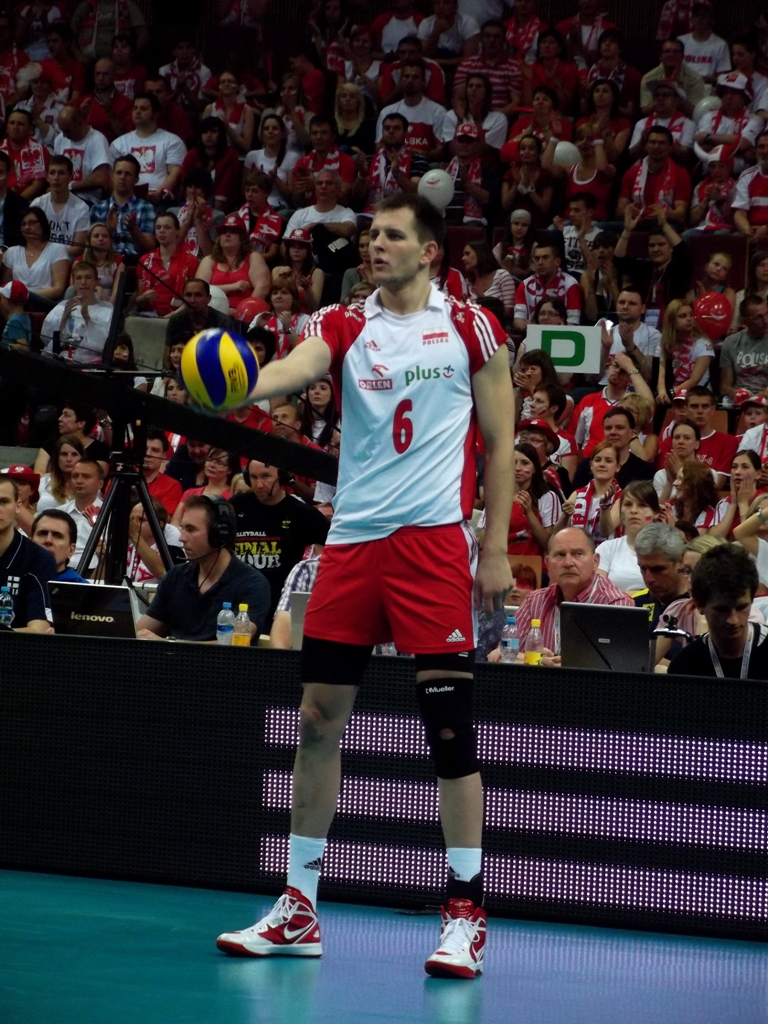
Bartosz Kurek

Hubert Jerzy Wagner known as a "Kat" Executioner was a successful coach, his team won Gold medal the 1976 Olympics.

Poland hosted the 2022 FIVB Volleyball Men's World Championship, in which they won the silver medal, the 2014 FIVB World Championship, in which they won the gold medal and European Championship 2013 with Denmark. The Polish Men National Volleyball Team had achieved 14 medals from international competitions since 1965, it has also won the recent 2012 FIVB World League winning 3–0 over the US in the final. In 2018, Poland defended the World Champions title at the 2018 FIVB Volleyball Men's World Championship by defeating Brazil in the final (3–0). The Poland national team is currently ranked as first in the world.

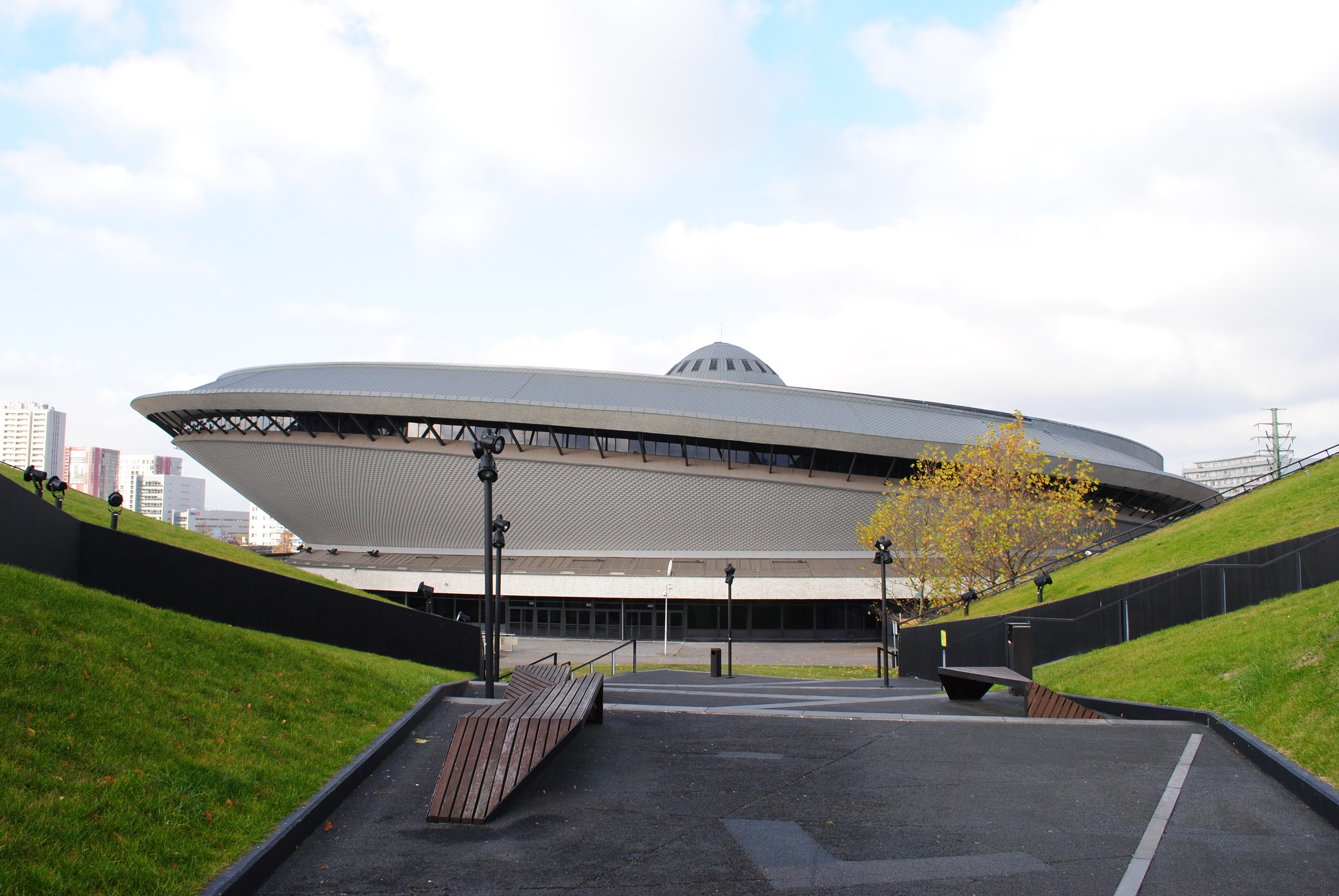
Popular Spodek sport's complex in Katowice

Poland featured a women's national team in beach volleyball that competed at the 2018–2020 CEV Beach Volleyball Continental Cup.

== Motorcycle speedway ==
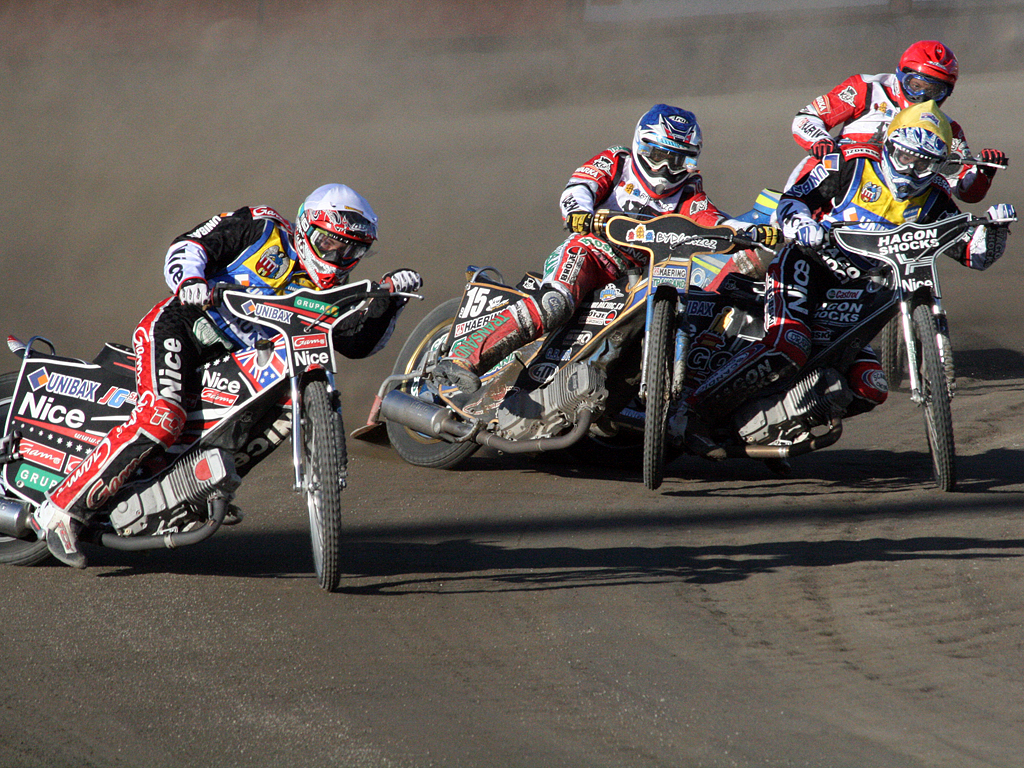
Speedway match in the Polish League between Polonia Bydgoszcz and Unibax Toruń, 2009

One of the most popular sports in Poland is motorcycle speedway. The Polish Extraleague has the highest average attendances for any sport in Poland. The national motorcycle speedway team of Poland is controlled by the Polish Motor Union (PZM). The team is one of the major teams in international speedway. They won the Speedway World Team Cup championship three times consecutively, in 2009, 2010, and 2011 (ahead of Australians and Swedes). No team has ever managed such feat. The first meetings in Poland were held in the 1930s. Championships include: Individual Speedway Polish Championship (IMP), Polish Pairs Speedway Championship (MPPK), Team Speedway Polish Championship (DMP), and Speedway Ekstraliga. The Junior U-21 championships include: Individual Speedway Junior Polish Championship (MIMP), Polish Pairs Speedway Junior Championship (MMPPK), and Team Speedway Junior Polish Championship (MDMP).

== Basketball ==
In the 1960s, the national team belonged to the world elite as it won silver at the 1963 European Basketball Championship and bronze at the 1965 and 1967 event. At the 1967 FIBA World Championship, Poland was among the world's five elite basketball teams. At the 1964 and 1968 Summer Olympics, the Orły ("Eagles," as the team is often nicknamed) finished 6th. Poland returned to the FIBA Basketball World Cup in 2019 which will be held in China their first match in the event will face off against Venezuela on opening day on 31 August 2019 in Beijing at the Cadillac Arena.

Since 2000, basketball in Poland went through a revival and has been home to several NBA players, including Marcin Gortat, Maciej Lampe, Cezary Trybański and Jeremy Sochan. The country hosted the 2009 European Basketball Championship.

== Ice hockey ==
The Poland men's national ice hockey team is the national ice hockey team of Poland, and a member of the International Ice Hockey Federation. They are ranked 21st in the world in the IIHF World Rankings, but prior to the 1980s they were ranked as high as 6th internationally. They are one of only 8 countries never to have played below the Division I (former B Pool) level. The Polish Ice Hockey Federation (Polish: Polski Związek Hokeja na Lodzie, PZHL) is the governing body that oversees ice hockey in Poland.

The Polska Hokej Liga (polish – Ekstraliga w hokeju na lodzie) is the premier ice hockey league in Poland. Poland has managed to produce some NHL calibre talent including Mariusz Czerkawski with the New York Islanders, Peter Sidorkiewicz for both the Hartford Whalers and the Ottawa Senators, and Krzysztof Oliwa for the New Jersey Devils where he won a Stanley Cup in 1999–2000.

== Rally ==
Poland held Polish Rally Championship (Rajdowe Samochodowe Mistrzostwa Polski, RSMP) since 1928. The Rally Poland (Rajd Polski) is the second oldest rally in the world after the famous classic Rally Monte Carlo. Between 1998 and 2001 the level was the strongest in Europe because many great drivers were racing in WRC cars. For a poor turnout Polski Związek Motorowy (PZM) rallies have lost rank, but they are still popular in Poland.

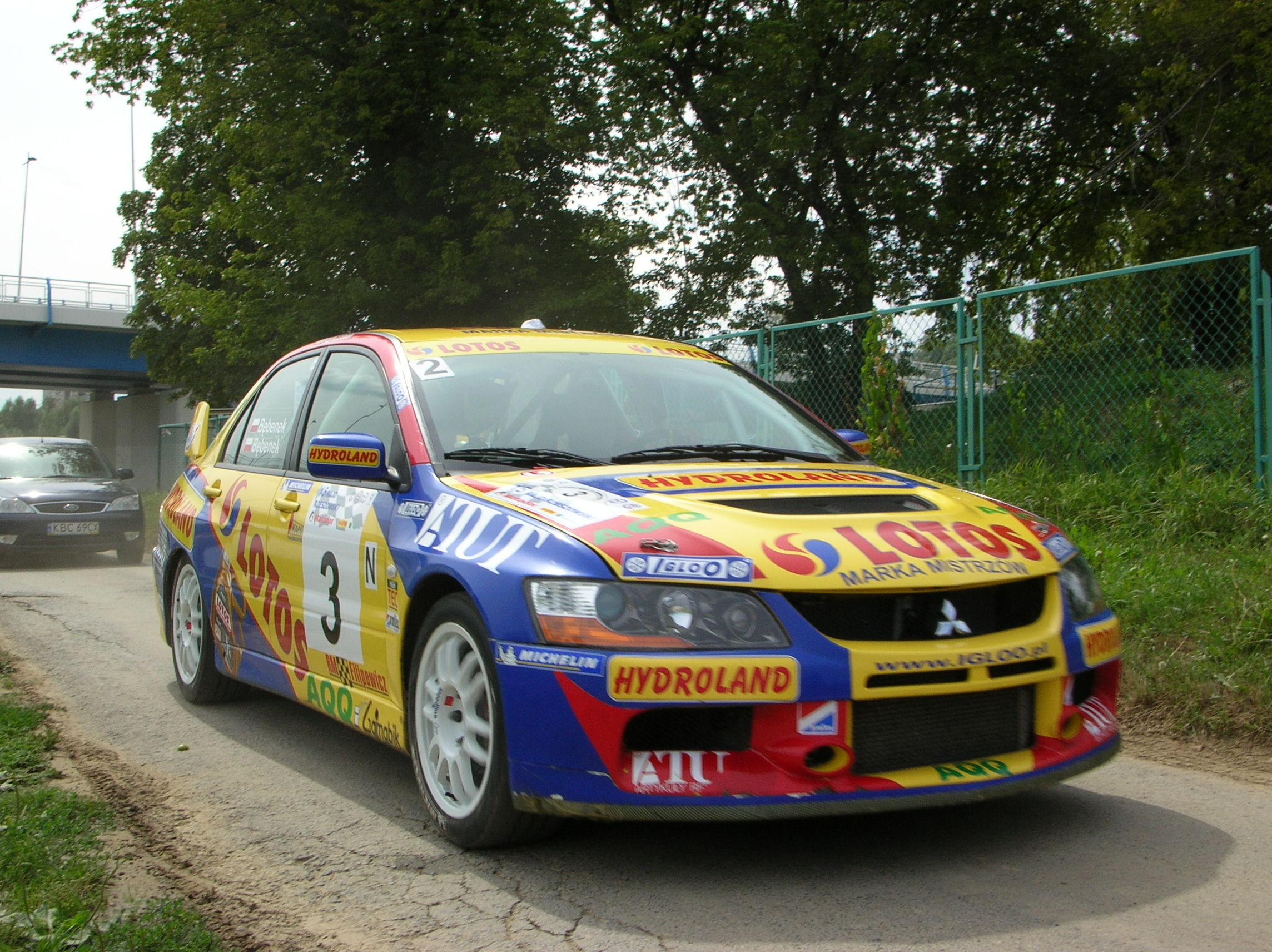
Michał Bębenek in Mitsubishi Lancer Evo IX.

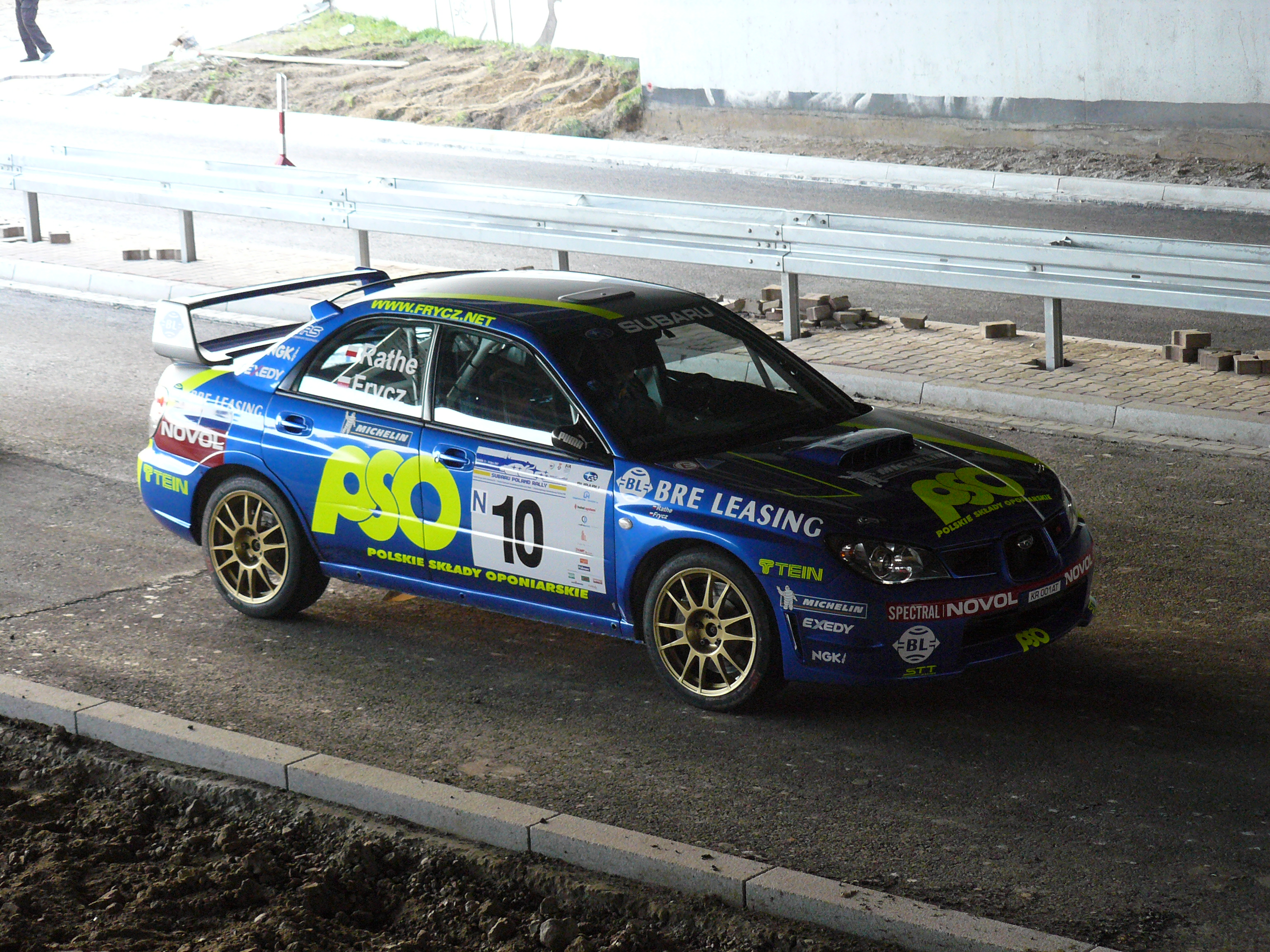
Sebastian Frycz and Jacek Rathe on Subaru Poland Rally – Wawelski Rally.

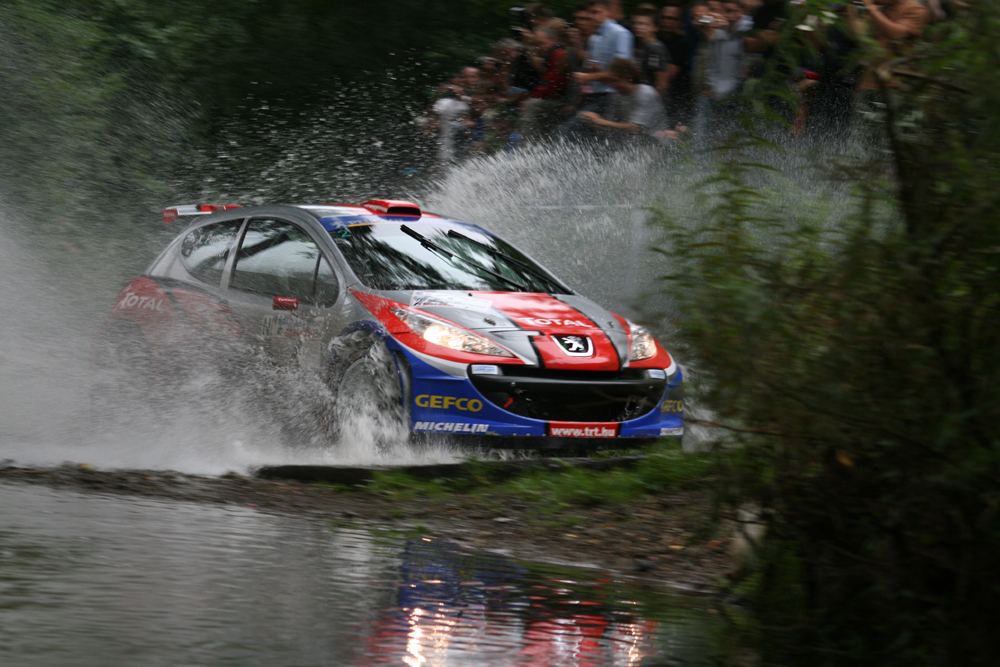
Lotos Baltic Cup

== Rugby union ==
In 1921, Louis Amblard, a Frenchman, set up the first Polish rugby club called "The White Eagles". The first match was in 1922, and the first club international in 1924 against a Romanian side. The game became established in the Warsaw Military Academy in the early 1930s. Nowadays rugby union is played in around 40 clubs by over 6.000 players.

== Other sports ==
- Orienteering is a popular sport that combines cross-country running with land navigation traits in the woods. Orienteering in Poland is organized by the Polski Związek Orientacji Sportowej.
- Ice yachting – Karol Jabłoński is an International DN champion of the world.
- Alpine skiing - notable Polish alpine skiers include Andrzej Bachleda-Curuś (the only Polish alpine skier to win medals at the FIS Alpine World Ski Championships), Andrzej Bachleda-Curuś III, sisters Malgorzata and Dorota Tlałka-Mogore (who both took podium finishes in the FIS Alpine Ski World Cup) and Maryna Gąsienica-Daniel.

== Olympic Games ==
The Polish Olympic Committee was created in 1918 and recognized in 1919. It has participated at the Olympic Games since 1924, except for the Soviet-led boycott of the 1984 Summer Olympics.

Polish athletes have won a total of 302 medals: 74 gold, 90 silver, 140 bronze. Poland is the third most successful country (after Hungary and Romania) of those who have never hosted the Olympics.

Its most successful teams have been football and volleyball. Poland ranks fifth all-time in modern pentathlon, seventh in athletics, and has also been successful in weightlifting, martial arts and Nordic skiing.

== Notable Polish athletes ==
Justyna Kowalczyk (born 19 January 1983 in Limanowa, Poland) is a Polish cross country skier who has been competing since 2000. She is an Olympic champion and also a double World Champion. She won Tour de Ski four times in a row and World cup four times, She won five medals (2-gold,1-silver,2-bronze) in the Olympic Games and seven medals (2-gold,3-silver,2-bronze) in the World Championships.

Irena Szewińska, sprinter (born Irena Kirszenstein, 24 May 1946 in Leningrad, Russia. Between 1964 and 1980 Szewińska participated in five Olympic Games, winning seven medals, three of them gold. She also broke six world records and was the first woman to hold world records at 100 m, 200 m and 400 m at the same time. She also won 13 medals in European Championships. Between 1965 and 1979, Szewińska has gathered 26 titles of Champion of Poland in 100 m sprint, 200 m sprint, 400 m sprint, 4 × 400 m relay and long jump.

Agnieszka Radwańska, (born 6 March 1989 in Kraków, full name Agnieszka Roma Radwańska) is a WTA Tour former World No. 2 Polish tennis player. Finalist The Championships, Wimbledon in 2012 and the winner of 2015 WTA Finals.

Adam Małysz, ski jumper (born 3 December 1977 in Wisła, Poland) – Małysz won four Olympic medals (3 silver, 1 bronze) at the 2002 Winter Games in Salt Lake City and 2010 Winter Olympics in Vancouver and has won the World Championships for 4 times, and got 1 silver and bronze medal. He has also won an incredible 39 World Cup competitions, which gives him third place on the all-time list, behind Austria's Gregor Schlierenzauer (52) and Finland's Matti Nykänen (46). He is the first ski jumper ever to win the World Cup 3 times in a row. After concluding his ski jumping career, Małysz has appeared in the Dakar Rally.

Robert Korzeniowski, (born 30 July 1968 in Lubaczów, Poland) is a former Polish racewalker. He has won four gold medals at the Summer Olympics and has won three world championships.

Mariusz Pudzianowski, a professional strongman (born 7 February 1977) – He started Kyokushin in 1988, weight training in 1990 and box in 1992. At the end of the 1990s he focussed on strongman competitions. He is one of the three men that won the World's Strongest Man title (in 2002, 2003, 2005, 2007, and 2008) near Jón Páll Sigmarsson and Magnus Ver Magnusson. He is also the only man to ever win the World's Strongest Man title 5 times.

Andrzej Gołota, boxer (born 5 January 1968) – In his early days, Gołota had 111 wins in a stellar amateur career that culminated in his winning a bronze medal at the 1988 Seoul Olympics. Gołota also captured a bronze medal at the 1989 European Amateur Boxing Championships. His professional record stands at 39 wins, 6 losses, one no contest and one draw, with 32 knockouts.

Tomasz Adamek, a professional heavyweight boxer (born 1 December 1976) – his professional record (as of March 2013) is: 48 wins, 2 losses, with 29 knockouts.

Jerzy Dudek, football player (born 23 March 1973 in Rybnik, Poland) – Dudek, a famous Polish goalkeeper began his professional career with Sokół Tychy, a team in the Polish National Football League where he played one season in 1995–96. Between 1996 and 2002, Dudek was a member of Feyenoord Rotterdam of the Eredivisie league in the Netherlands, where he won the 1998–99 Dutch League Championship and the 1999–2000 Dutch Super Cup. During his stay with Feyenoord he also received the league's highest goalkeeping honors, winning the Dutch Keeper of the Year Award twice (1998–99, 1999–2000. In 2002 Dudek was transferred to Liverpool of the Premier League, where he became a household name, winning the League Cup in 2002–03, the UEFA Champions League in 2004–05 and the European Super Cup in 2005–06, as well as the FA Cup in 2005–06. Between 2007 and 2011 Dudek played for Real Madrid in Spain, and then retired. He has made 60 appearances for the Poland National Team.

Mariusz Czerkawski, hockey player (born 13 April 1972 in Radomsko, Poland) – Czerkawski has enjoyed a successful career in the National Hockey League with a total of 215 goals, 220 assists and 435 points in 745 games. Throughout his 14-year NHL career, Czerkawski played for the Boston Bruins (1993–96, 2005–06), Edmonton Oilers (1996–97), New York Islanders (1997–2002, 2003–04) Montreal Canadiens (2002–03) and the Toronto Maple Leafs (2005–06). Czerkawski represented Poland in the 1992 Winter Olympics where he collected one assist in five games. Presently, he plays for the Rapperswil-Jona Lakers of the Nationalliga A in Switzerland.

Krzysztof Oliwa, hockey player (born 12 April 1973 in Tychy, Poland) – Former professional ice hockey player who played the left wing position in the National Hockey League. Oliwa was nicknamed "The Hammer" due to his physical and intimidating on-ice presence. At 6'5", with a strong build, he would normally play the role of the team's enforcer. Oliwa won the 1999–2000 Stanley Cup as a member of the New Jersey Devils. Oliwa has also played for the Columbus Blue Jackets, Pittsburgh Penguins, New York Rangers, Boston Bruins and Calgary Flames.

Zbigniew Boniek, football player (born 3 March 1956 in Bydgoszcz, Poland – He played on Zawisza Bydgoszcz, Widzew Łódź, Juventus and AS Roma. In 2004 Pelé got him on the FIFA 100 list. Today, he is the president of the Polish Football Association. He was elected as the president on 26 October 2012.

Helena Rakoczy, (born 23 December 1921 in Kraków, Poland). Gymnast at Olympics (1952, 1956), and World Championships (1950, 1954). World Individual All-Around, Vault, Balance Beam, and Floor Exercise champion in 1950. Inducted into International Gymnastics Hall of Fame in 2004.

Robert Kubica (born 7 December 1984 in Kraków, Poland), Robert Kubica is the first Polish Formula One driver. He made his racing debut at the 2006 Hungarian Grand Prix. In only his third race he experienced his first podium finish at Monza, Italy at the 2006 Italian Grand Prix. During this race he finished third and stood on the podium next to Michael Schumacher (Germany) and Kimi Räikkönen (Finland). In the 2007 Formula One season he survived a horrific crash at the Canadian Grand Prix. Kubica came out of the crash with only a sprained ankle and minor concussion. Robert Kubica scored his first victory in Formula 1 at 2008 Canadian Grand Prix (it was also the first win for the BMW Sauber team). Robert Kubica has brought Formula One to Poland, bringing along with him many new fans. In February 2011, he had a crash in the Rally Ronde di Andora. He went through long rehabilitation processes. In 2013, Kubica started racing in the World Rally Championship with immediate success, winning WRC-2 championship in 2013. He then moved to top WRC class for 2014 season. After testing for the Renault F1 team during the 2017 season, he became Williams' official development driver for 2018. The year after he was promoted up to the main seat, with a full time contract with Williams for the 2019 season, unfortunately the car was the slowest of the field and he was not renewed for 2020. While he remained as reserve driver for the Sauber team (named Alfa Romeo Racing at the time) until 2023, he didn't get a full time seat in F1 again. Since 2022, he's been racing on the World Endurance Championship (WEC), where he remains to this day, now as an AF Corse driver, piloting the Ferrari 499P Hypercar after winning the championship in the LMP2 category in 2023.

Sobiesław Zasada (born 27 January 1930 in Dąbrowa Górnicza), is a Polish former rally driver. He won the European Rally Championship in 1966, 1967, 1971 and was vice-champion in 1968, 1969, 1972.

Paweł Zagumny (born 18 October 1977 in Jasło, Poland) is a Polish volleyball player. He is a son of Lech Zagumny, the coach of Polish volleyball club AZS Politechnika Warszawa. He is playing in volleyball club Kedzierzyn-Kozle and also in Poland national team, in which he debuted in 1998. In his prime, Zagumny was widely considered as the best setter in the world.

Tomasz Gollob, motorcycle speedway rider (born 11 April 1971 in Bydgoszcz, Poland) – Gollob is Poland's most recognized motorcyclist. He has finished in the top ten of the Speedway Grand Prix 15 times, including his best performance in 2010 when he captured first place.

Alan Kulwicki (14 December 1954 – 1 April 1993), nicknamed "Special K" and the "Polish Prince", was an American NASCAR Winston Cup Series. He won the 1992 Cup Series championship.

Grzegorz Lato, footballer (born 8 April 1950 in Malbork, Poland) – Lato is the all-time cap leader for the Poland National Football Team. He was the leading scorer at the 1974 FIFA World Cup, where he won the Golden Shoe after scoring a tournament best seven goals. Lato's playing career coincided with the golden era of Polish football, which began with Olympic gold in Munich in 1972 and ended a decade later with a third-place finish at the 1982 World Cup in Spain, a repeat of the Poles' impressive finish at the 1974 championships in Germany. Lato retired from professional football in 1984 with 45 international goals, a record that stands to this day. On 30 October 2008, he was elected as the president of the Polish FA, but on 26 October 2012, Zbigniew Boniek became the Association's president.

Jadwiga Jędrzejowska was a successful tennis player before the WWII, Wojciech Fibak during the 1970s and 1980s, Agnieszka Radwańska until her retirement from tennis in 2018.

Joanna Jędrzejczyk (born 18 August 1987), is a mixed martial artist who competes in the women's strawweight division of the Ultimate Fighting Championship. She is a former UFC Women's Strawweight Champion and previously held the title for 9

== Gallery ==
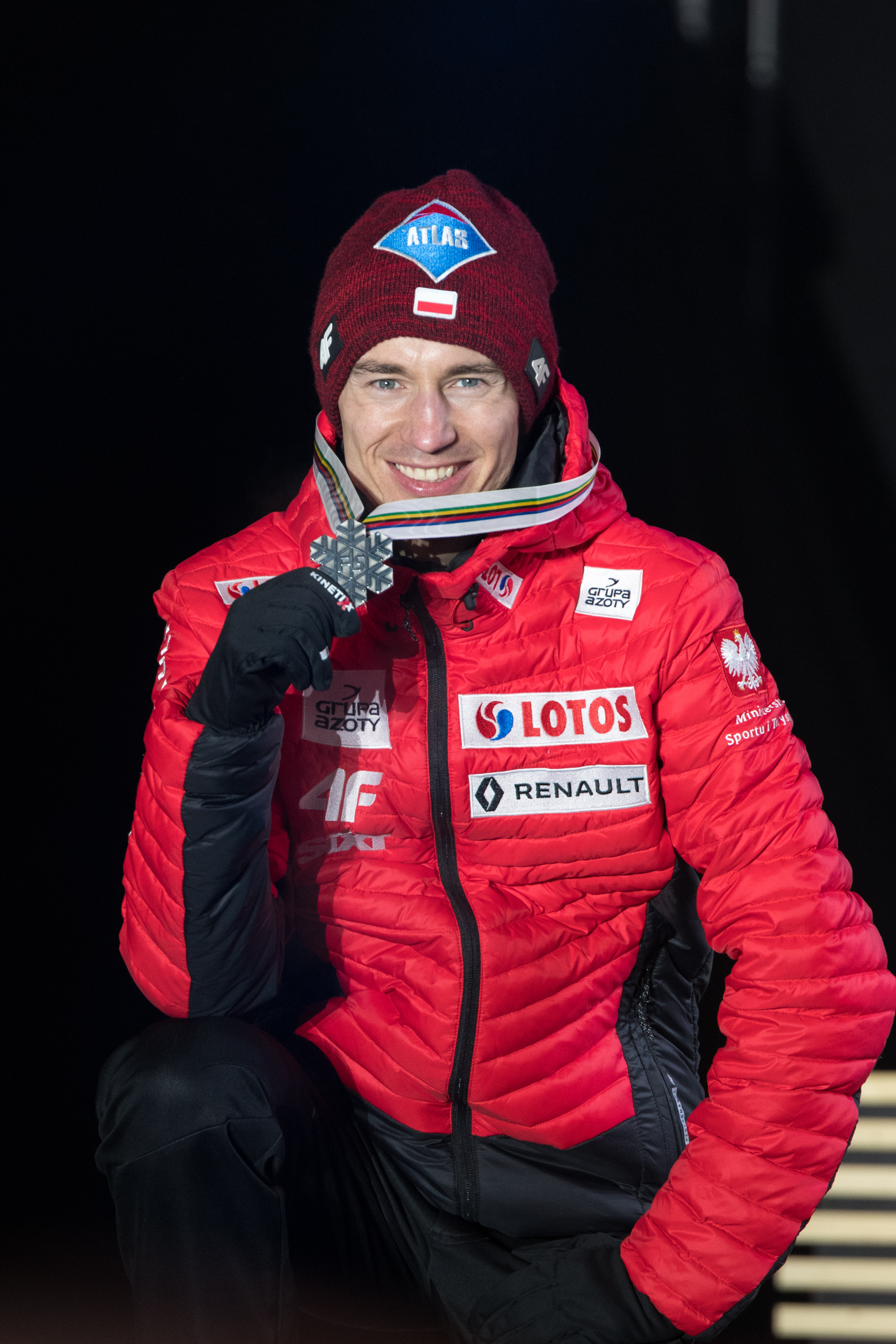
Kamil Stoch

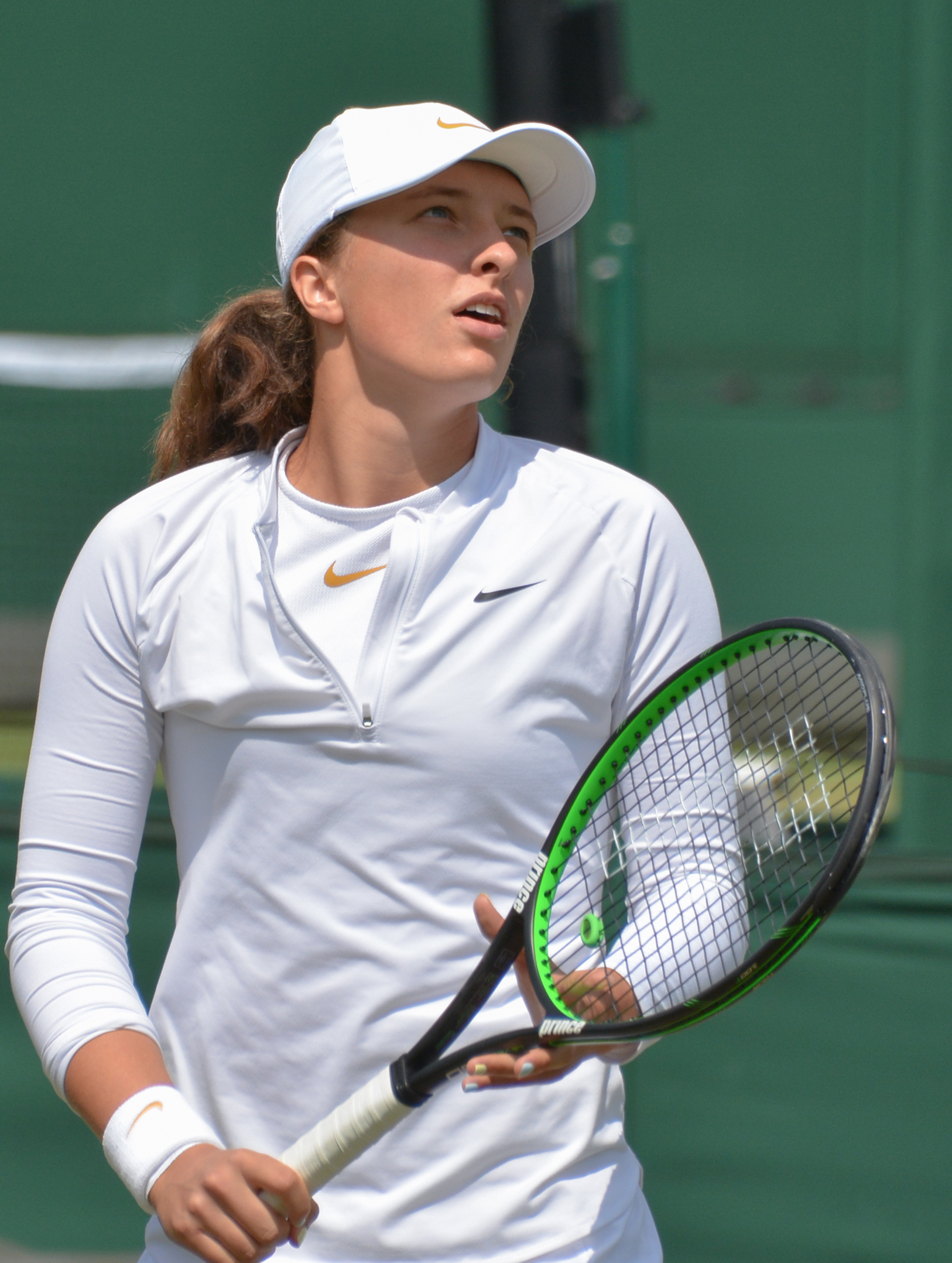
Iga Świątek

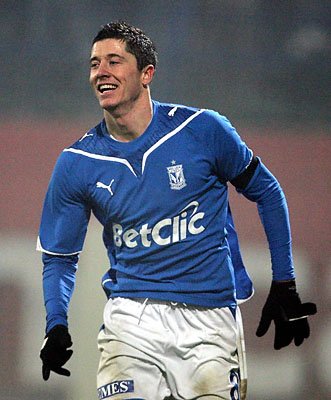
Robert Lewandowski

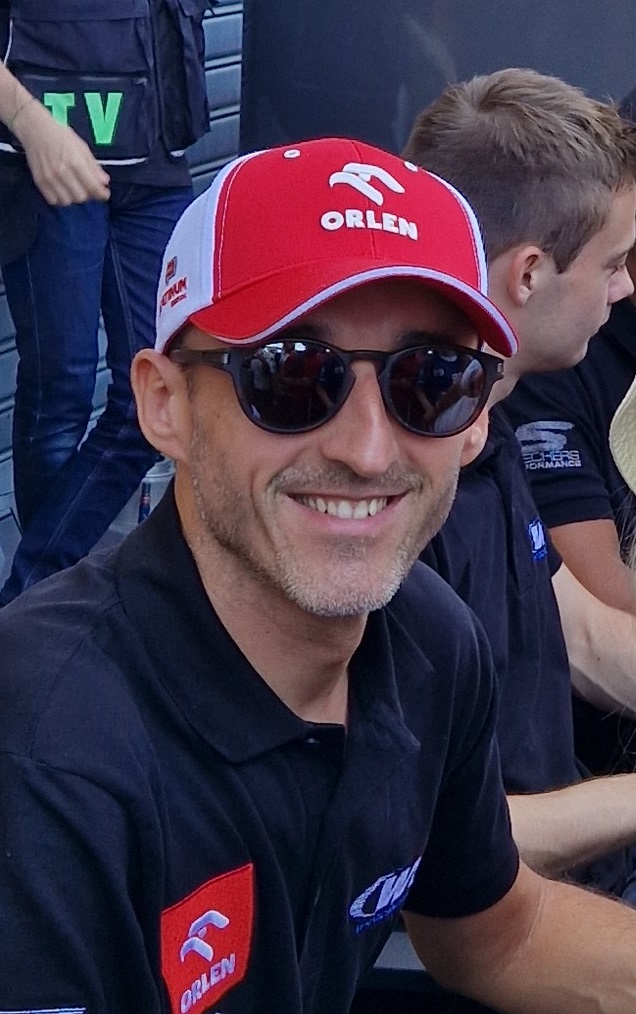
Robert Kubica

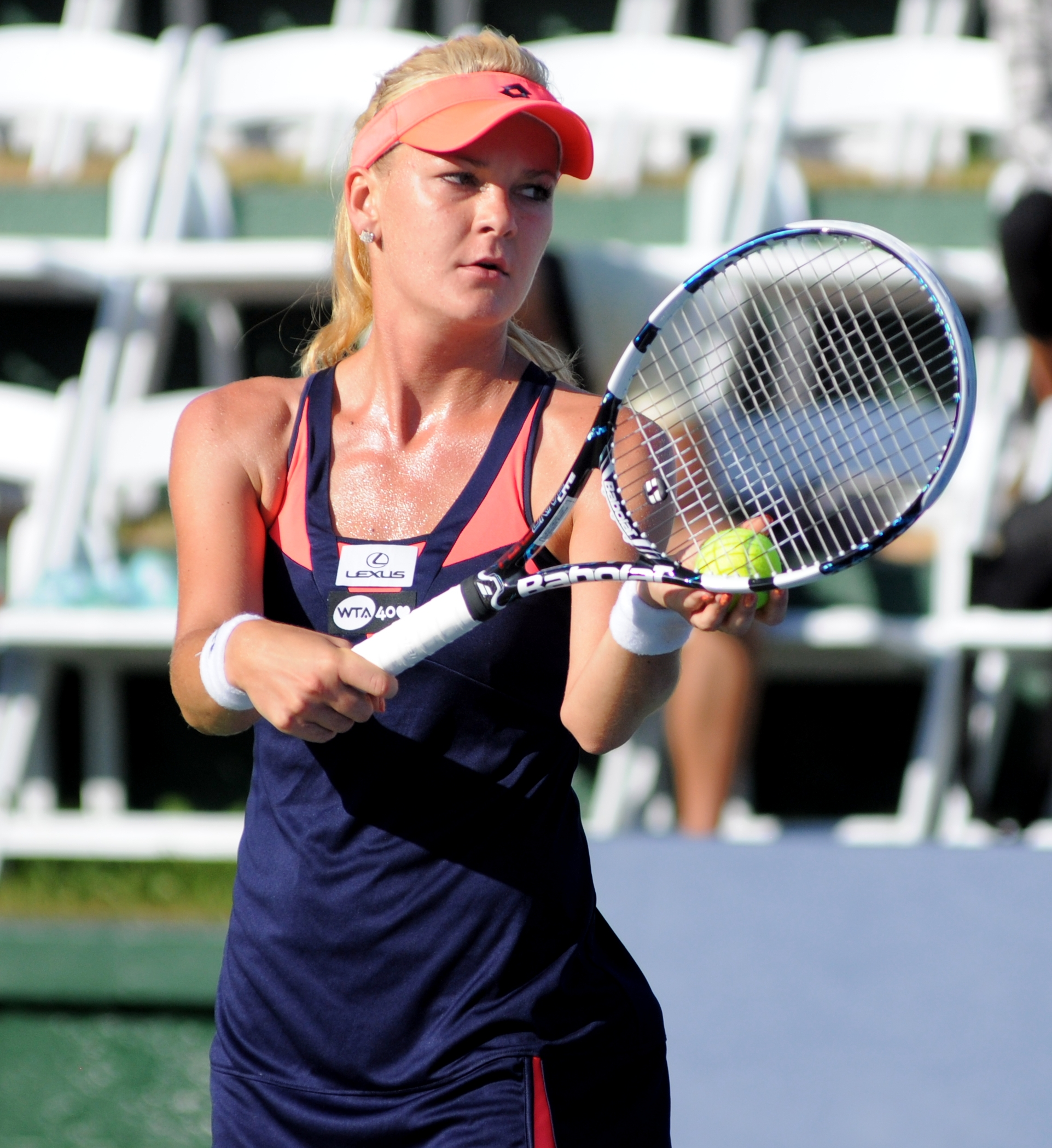
Agnieszka Radwańska

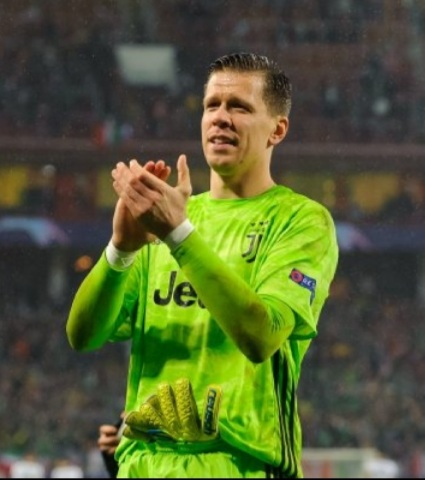
Wojciech Szczęsny

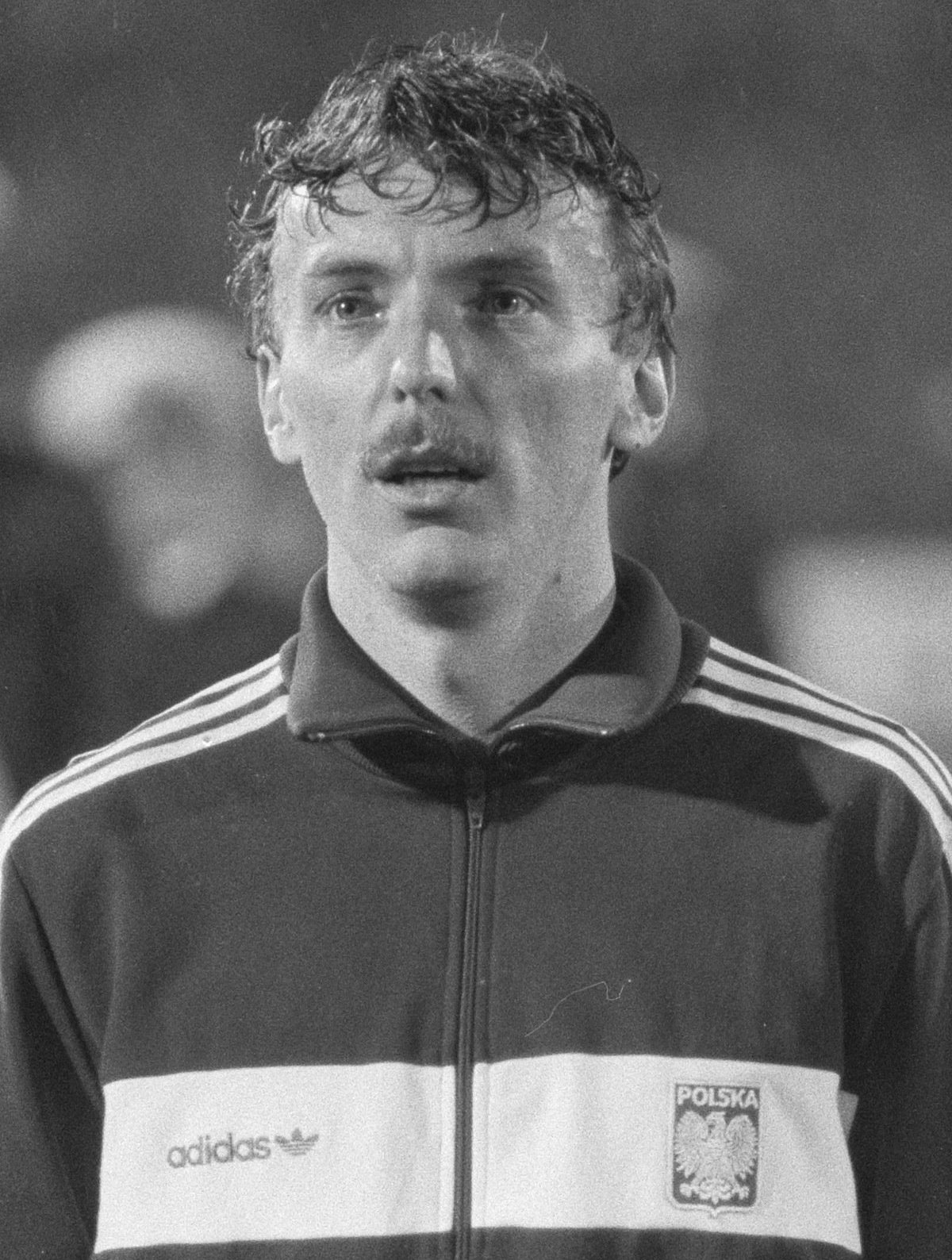
Zbigniew Boniek

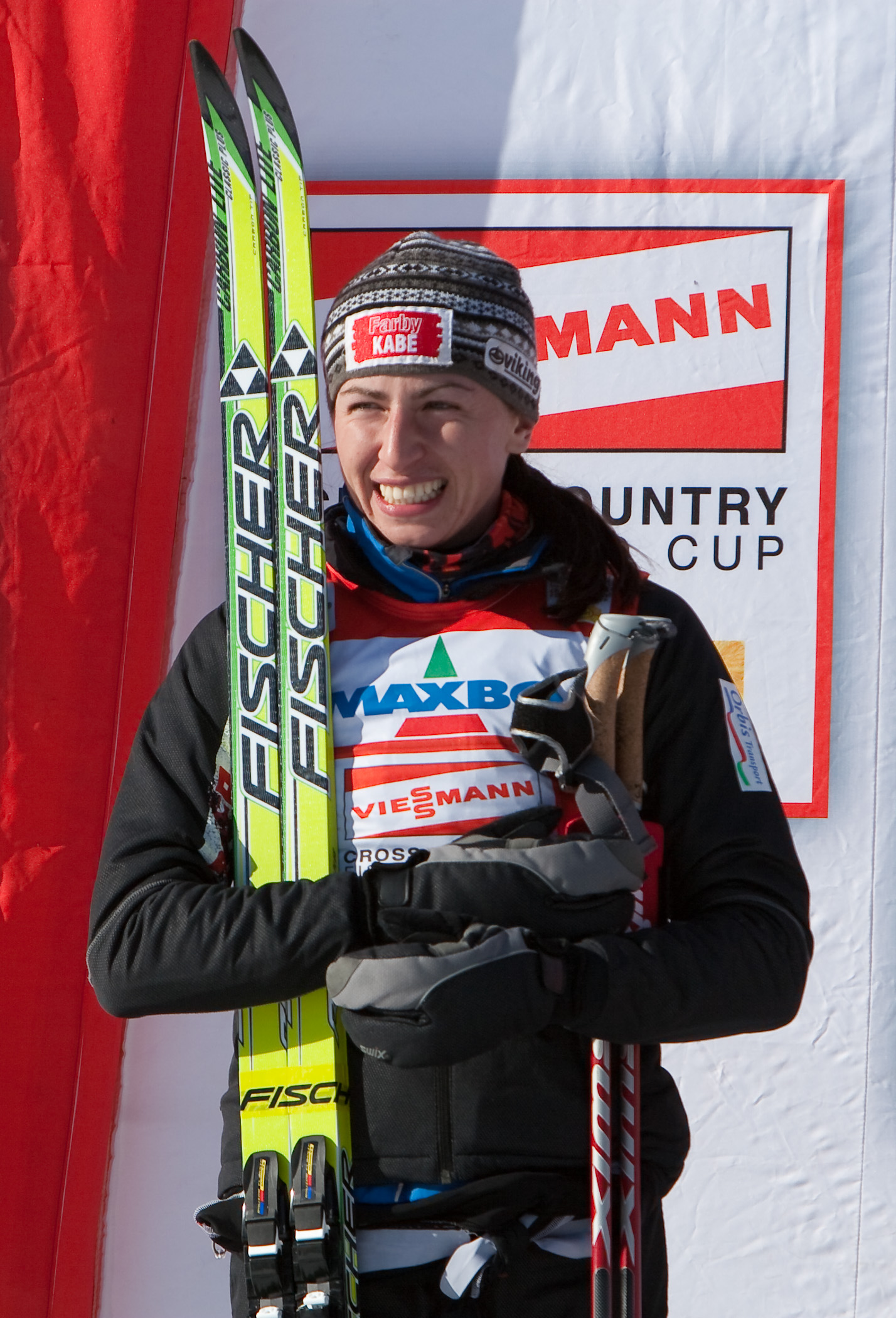
Justyna Kowalczyk

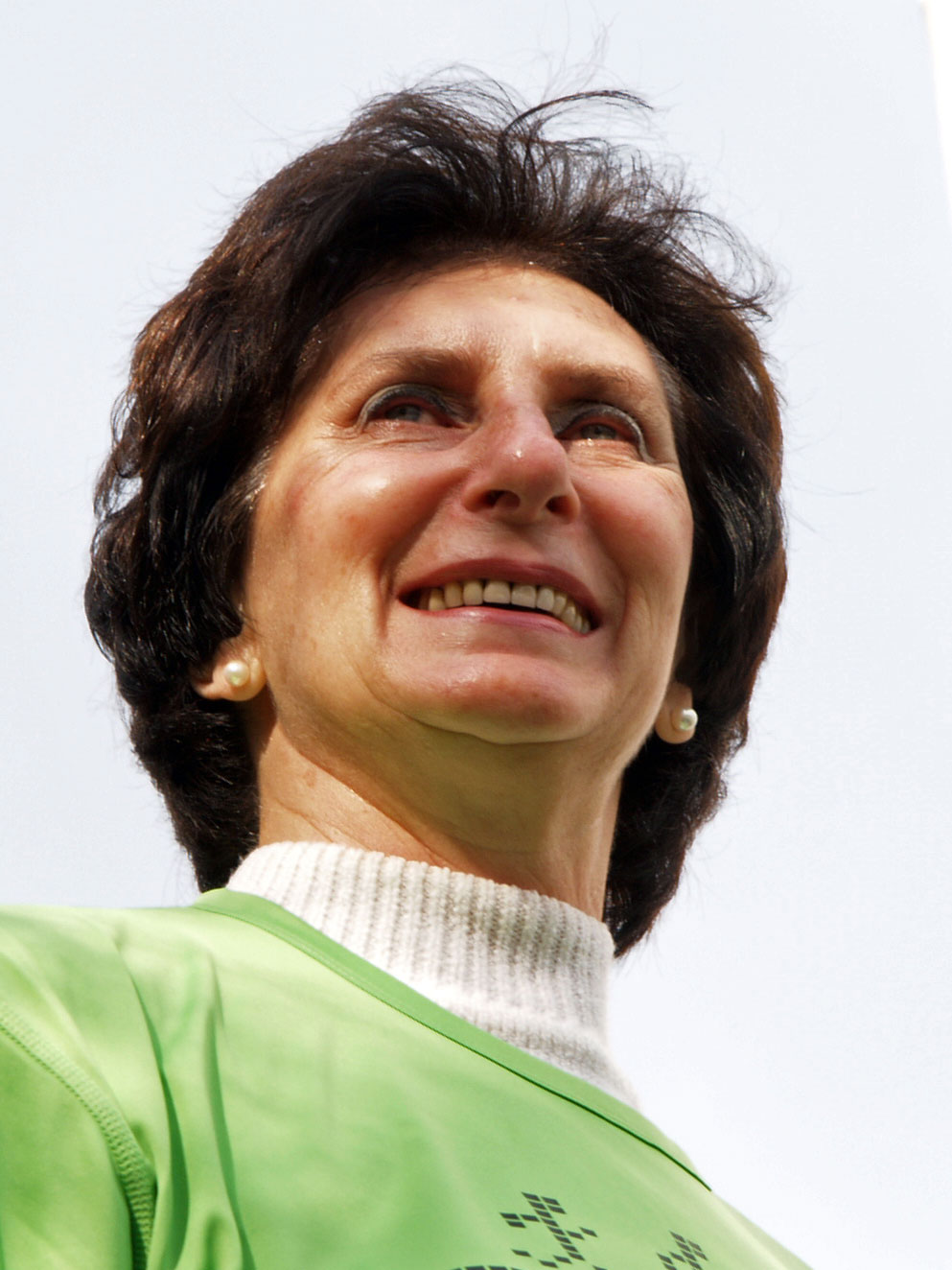
Irena Szewińska

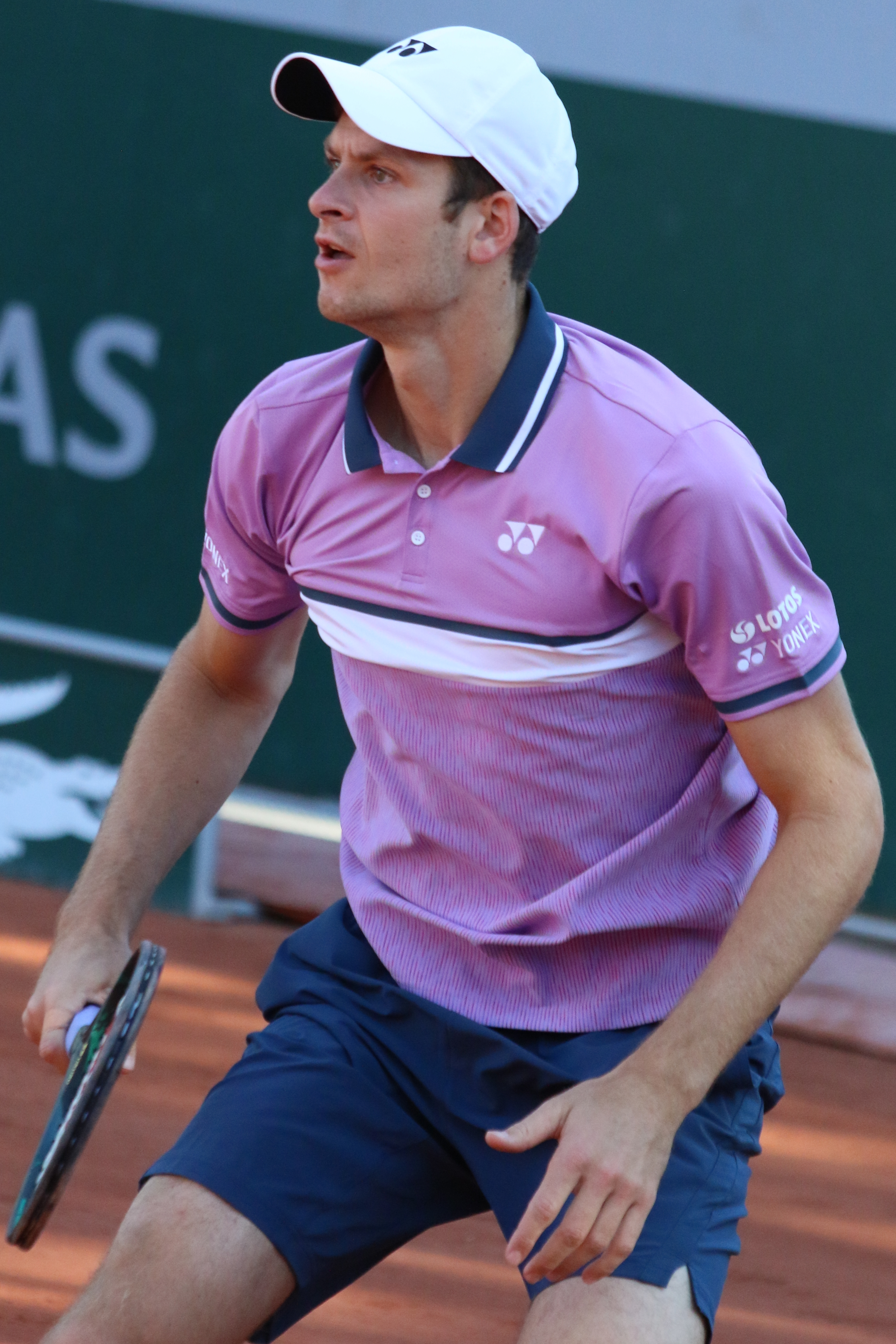
Hubert Hurkacz

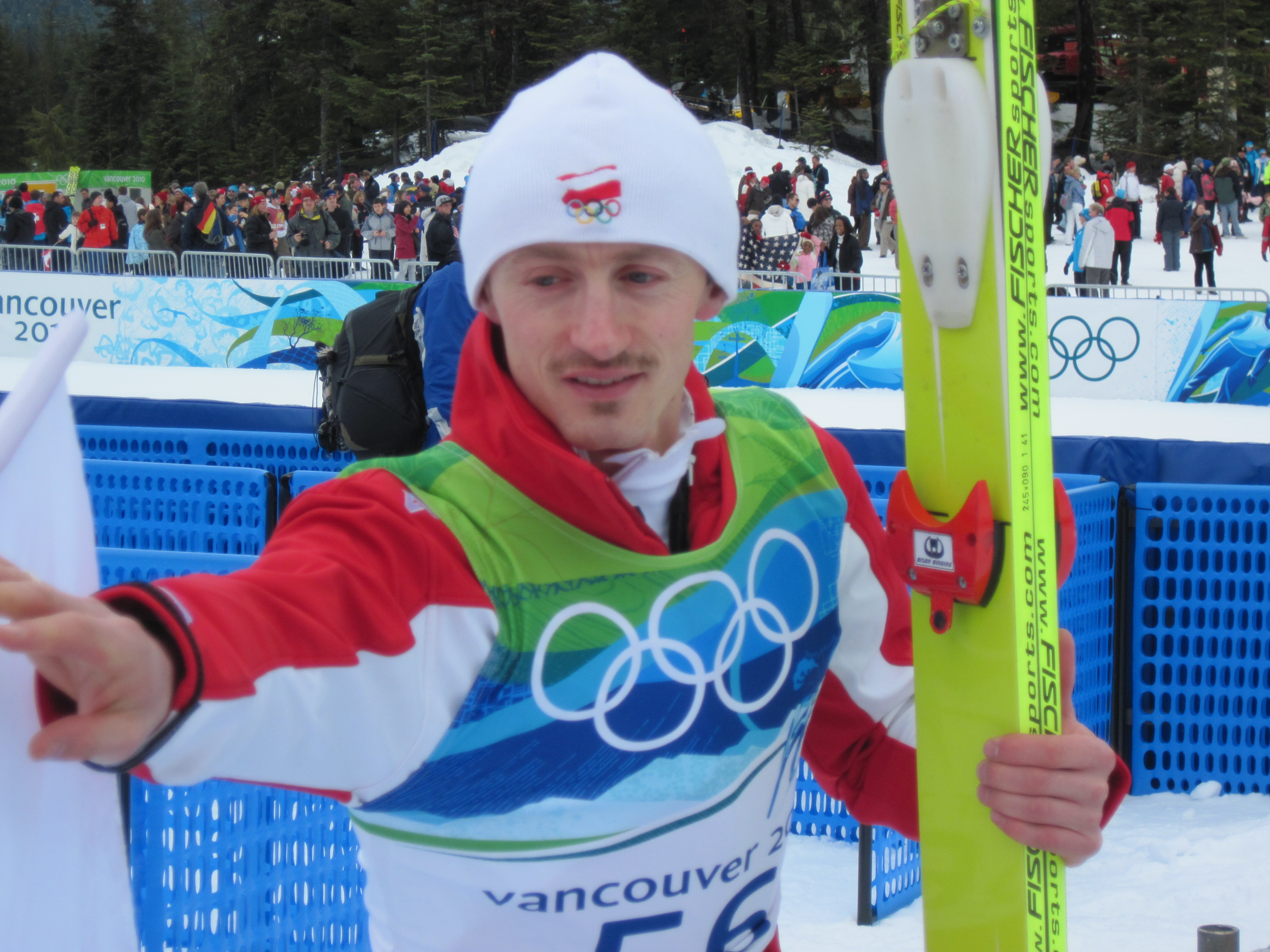
Adam Małysz

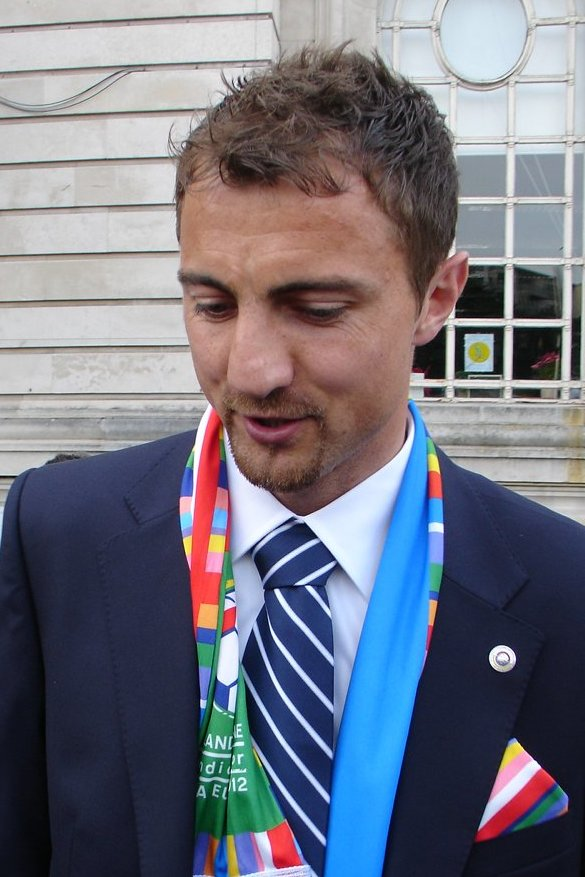
Jerzy Dudek

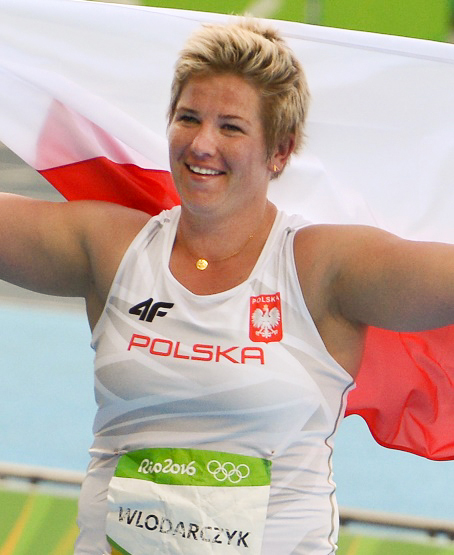
Anita Włodarczyk

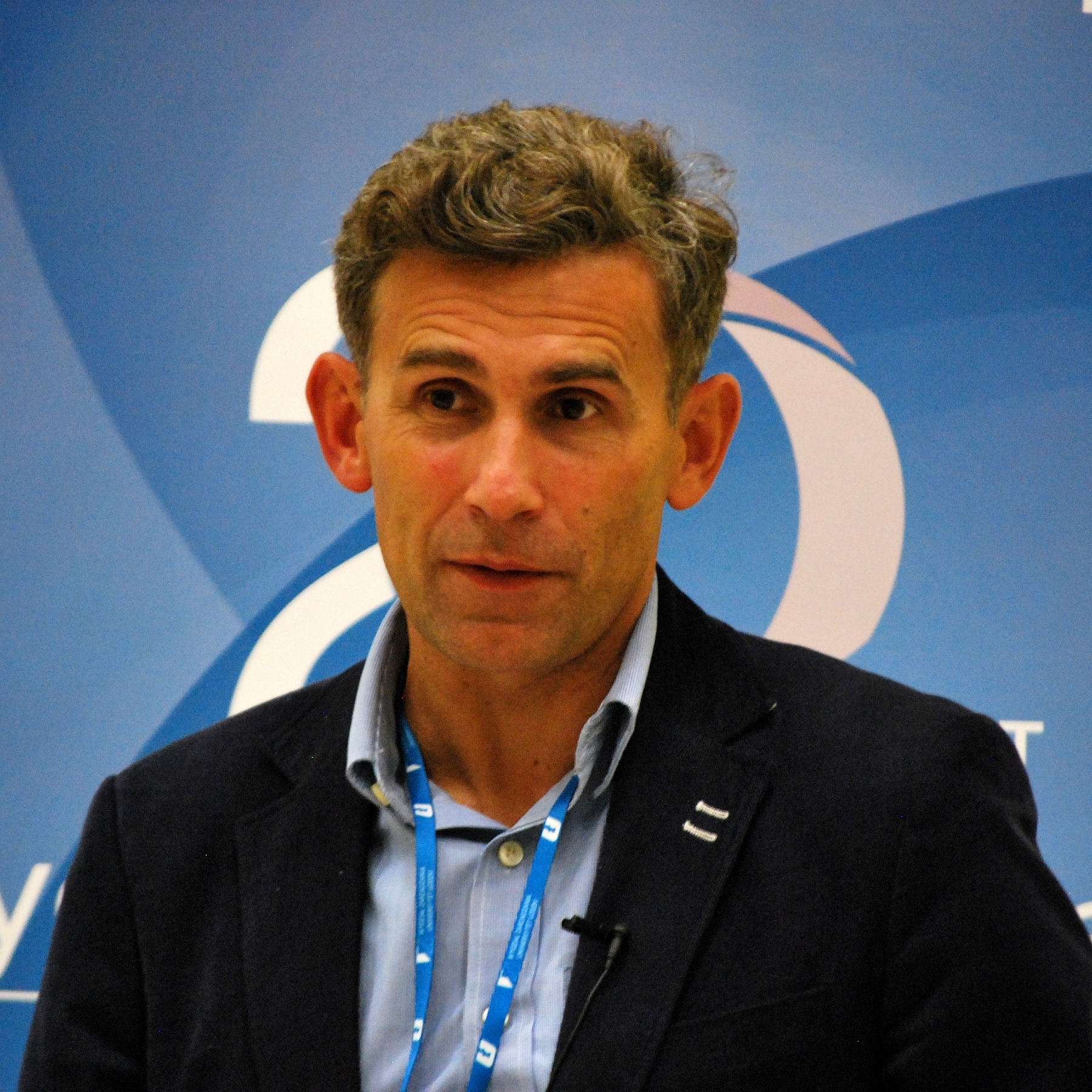
Robert Korzeniowski

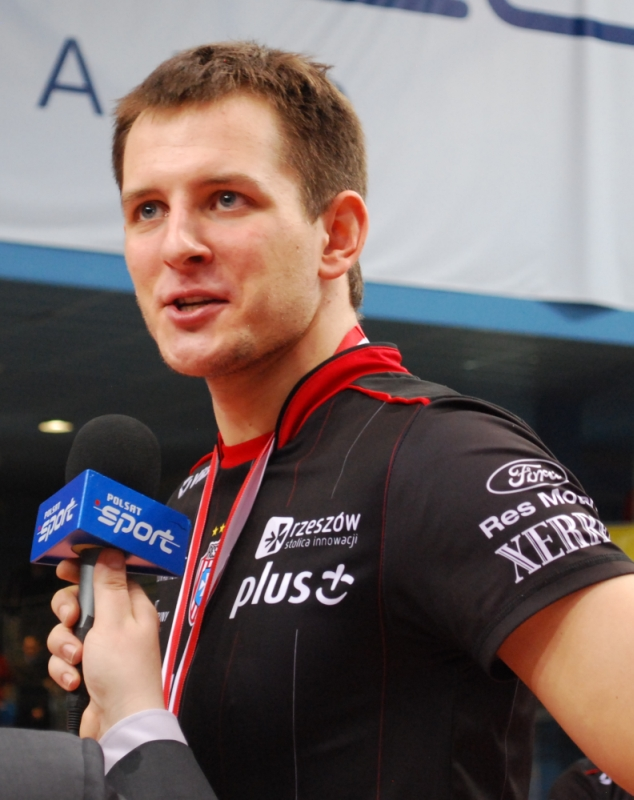
Bartosz Kurek

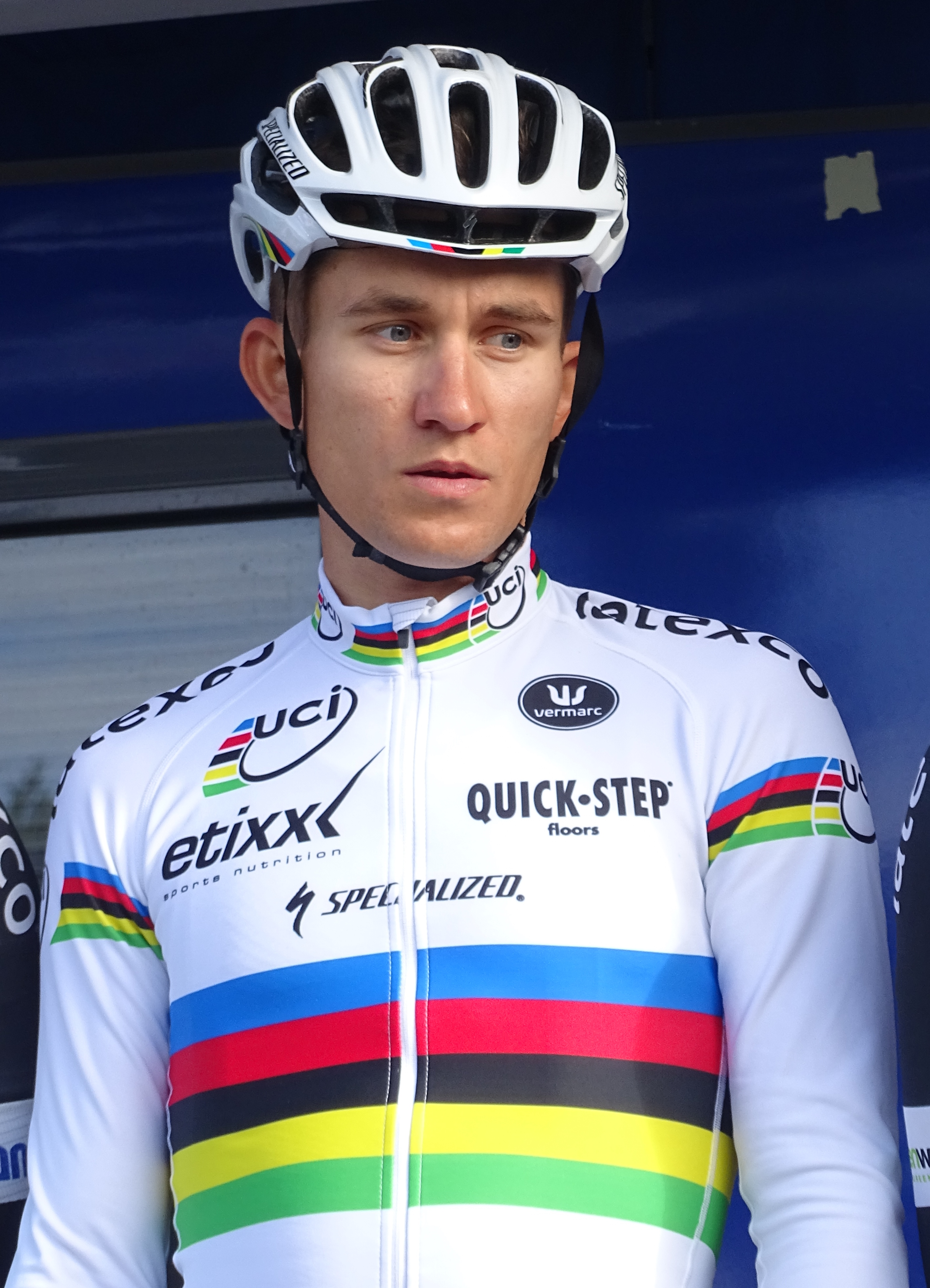
Michał Kwiatkowski

== Research and academic education ==
Poland developed a network of physical education universities, the oldest of them the Józef Piłsudski University of Physical Education in Warsaw.

== Arts ==
Poles obtained several medals in Art competitions at the Summer Olympics.

== Museums ==
- Museum of Sport and Tourism in Warsaw
- Museum for Sport and Tourism in Karpacz
- Museum of Sport and Tourism in Łódź, the division of the City Museum
- Museum of Hunting and Horsemanship

== See also ==
- List of Polish athletes
- Sport in Warsaw
- Sports in Białystok
