= IOA =

IOA may refer to:

== Locations ==
- Islands of Adventure, a Universal Destinations & Experiences theme park in Orlando, Florida
- Institute of Astronomy, Cambridge
- UCL Institute of Archaeology
- Ioannina National Airport, an airport serving the Greek town of Ioannina

== Organizations ==
- Indian Olympic Association
- Independent Olympic Athletes
- International Olympic Academy
- Institute of Acoustics, Chinese Academy of Sciences
- Institute of Acoustics (United Kingdom), a British engineering society
- International Ombudsman Association
- International Oversight Advisory, a fictional organization in the Stargate franchise
- Irish Orienteering Association

== Other ==
- Input Output Application, a method used to add communicate websites and software, inputting and outputting data.
- Input-output analysis, an economics model
- Information object address, IEC 60870-5-104
