= FRSO =

FRSO may stand for:

- Finnish Radio Symphony Orchestra
- Frankfurt Radio Symphony Orchestra
- Freedom Road Socialist Organization
- the French-speaking league of the Belgian Orienteering Federation (Fédération Régionale des Sports d'Orientation)
