= Orienteering Australia =

Sports governing body in Australia

- Sport: Orienteering
- Jurisdiction: Australia
- Abbreviation: OA
- Founded: 1970
- Affiliation: IOF
- Affiliation date: 1970
- Regional affiliation: Oceania
- President: Michael Dowling

Official website
- www.orienteering.asn.au
- (Australia)

Orienteering Australia is the National organisation responsible for the governing, organisation and promotion of orienteering in Australia. It is a Full Member of the International Orienteering Federation. Orienteering Australia has its publication The Australian Orienteer.

== Governance ==
The Board, which governs Orienteering Australia, is made up of representatives from Member States. Daily business is handled by an elected Board of 6-8 directors. Committees and Officers offer specialist advice to the Board.

== Finance ==
The Board Director of Finance is Richard Mountstephens. Orienteering Australia is sponsored principally by the Australian Sports Commission. The National Orienteering League is supported by Wildfire Sports and Trek.

== Members of the federation ==
Orienteering Australia is a federation made up of the 7 associations, with each State or territory of the commonwealth having a federation.

- ACT: Orienteering ACT
- NSW: Orienteering New South Wales
- QLD: Orienteering Queensland
- SA: Orienteering South Australia
- TAS: Orienteering Tasmania
- VIC: Orienteering Victoria
- WA: Orienteering Western Australia

For the Northern Territory, the Top End Orienteers (TEO) is the Orienteering Club, affiliated to OSA

== History ==
Orienteering Australia was founded in 1970, and joined the International Orienteering Federation the same year. Australia participated in the World Orienteering Championships first time in 1972. The 1985 World Championships were held in Bendigo, Australia.

Individual world champion from Australia is Johanna Allston, who won a gold medal in sprint in 2006. She also won the middle distance in the World Games in 2009. In 2024, Elizabeth Bourne was awarded an Order of Australia medal for services to conservation, and her contributions to orienteering.
