= CSOB =

CSOB can refer to:

- Československá obchodní banka, large Czech bank
- Český svaz orientačního běhu, orienteering association
- Commission scolaire de l'Or-et-des-Bois, francophone school district in Quebec, Canada
