= New Zealand Orienteering Federation =

Governing body of orienteering in New Zealand

- Sport: Orienteering
- Jurisdiction: New Zealand
- Founded: 1973
- Affiliation: IOF
- Regional affiliation: Oceania
- Chairperson: Peter Swanson

Official website
- www.nzorienteering.com
- (New Zealand)

New Zealand Orienteering Federation is the national Orienteering Association in New Zealand. It is recognized as the orienteering association for New Zealand by the International Orienteering Federation, of which it is a member.

In addition to the traditional foot orienteering, the NZ Orienteering Federation also organizes Mountain bike orienteering, Ski orienteering and Rogaining.

== History ==
The New Zealand Orienteering Federation joined the International Orienteering Federation in 1974, and New Zealand participated in the World Orienteering Championships first time in 1976.
