= Belarus Orienteering Federation =

Government Organization For Orienteering in Belarus

- Sport: Orienteering
- Jurisdiction: Belarus
- Abbreviation: BFO
- Affiliation: IOF
- Regional affiliation: Europe
- Chairman: Andrei Yakauleu

Official website
- orient.by
- (Belarus)

Belarus Orienteering Federation (Belarusian: Беларуская федэрацыя арыентавання; Russian: Белорусская федерация ориентирования) is the National organisation responsible for the governing, organisation and promotion of orienteering in Belarus. It is a full member of the International Orienteering Federation.

== Governance ==
The Congress is the highest body of the Belarus Orienteering Federation. It gathers once in four years, and elects the Presidium of the Belarus Orienteering Federation for a four-year term. The Presidium consists of: Chairman, Vice-Chairmen, Executive Secretary, Chief Coach of National Teams, and Executive Director.

In the period between Congresses the Council governs the Belarus Orienteering Federation. The Council is made up of representatives from each orienteering club, and gathers at least once a year. Daily business is handled by the Executive Secretary and the Chairman.
