= South African Orienteering Federation =

Governing body of orienteering in South Africa

South African Orienteering Federation (SAOF)
- Founded: 1981
- Type: Orienteering federation
- Region served: South Africa
- Website: www.orienteering.co.za

South African Orienteering Federation (SAOF) is the national Orienteering Association in South Africa. SAOF was founded in 1981, and is recognized as the orienteering association for South Africa by the International Orienteering Federation, of which it is a member.

SAOF is a member of the umbrella organization, the South African Sports Confederation and Olympic Committee (SASCOC).

== Orienteering championships ==
SAOF organizes the South African Orienteering championships, which was first held in Silvermine in 1983. The organization selects representatives from South Africa to participate at the World Orienteering Championships (first SAOF participation was in 1993), and they regularly participate at the Junior World Orienteering Championships.

== Honorary life members ==
Honorary life members are Piers Chapman (chairman of SAOF from 1984 to 1988) and Michael Wilson (instrumental in founding SAOF, as well as the RAND Orienteering Club).
