= Federación Española de Orientación =

Governing body of orienteering in Spain

Federatión Española de Orientación (FEDO)
- Type: Orienteering club
- Region served: Spain
- Website: http://www.fedo.org

The Federatión Española de Orientación (FEDO) is the national Orienteering Association in Spain. It is recognized as the orienteering association for Spain by the International Orienteering Federation, of which it is a member.
