= Colombian Orienteering Federation =

Orienteering association in Colombia

- Sport: Orienteering
- Jurisdiction: Colombia
- Abbreviation: FCO
- Affiliation: IOF
- Regional affiliation: South America
- Headquarters: Coliseo Cubierto El Campín; Entrada 17, Oficina 1A; Bogotá, D.C., Colombia
- President: Jose fernando Gomez Rueda

Official website
- www.orientacion.co
- (Colombia)

The Colombian Orienteering Federation (Spanish: Federación Colombiana de Orientación) is the national Orienteering Association in Colombia. It is recognized as the orienteering association for Colombia by the International Orienteering Federation, of which it is a member.
