= Dutch Orienteering Federation =

Governing body of orienteering in the Netherlands

Dutch Orienteering Federation Nederlandse Orienteringsloop Bond
- Type: Orienteering club
- Region served: Netherlands
- Website: www.nolb.nl

The Dutch Orienteering Federation (Dutch: Nederlandse Orienteringsloop Bond, NOLB) is the national Orienteering Association in the Netherlands. Orienteering is a group of sports that require navigational skills using a map and compass to navigate from point to point in diverse and usually unfamiliar terrain whilst moving at speed. It is recognized as the orienteering association for the Netherlands by the International Orienteering Federation, of which it is a member.

NOLB stands for "Nederlandse OriënteringsLoop Bond", this is Dutch for "Dutch Orienteering Federation". NOLB was founded on 12 December 1982, at first it acted as an orienteering club. But after ten years the organisational structure was changed. NOLB has nowadays (December 2018) about 430 members divided over 5 orienteering clubs.
