= North American Orienteering Championships =

Orinteering event

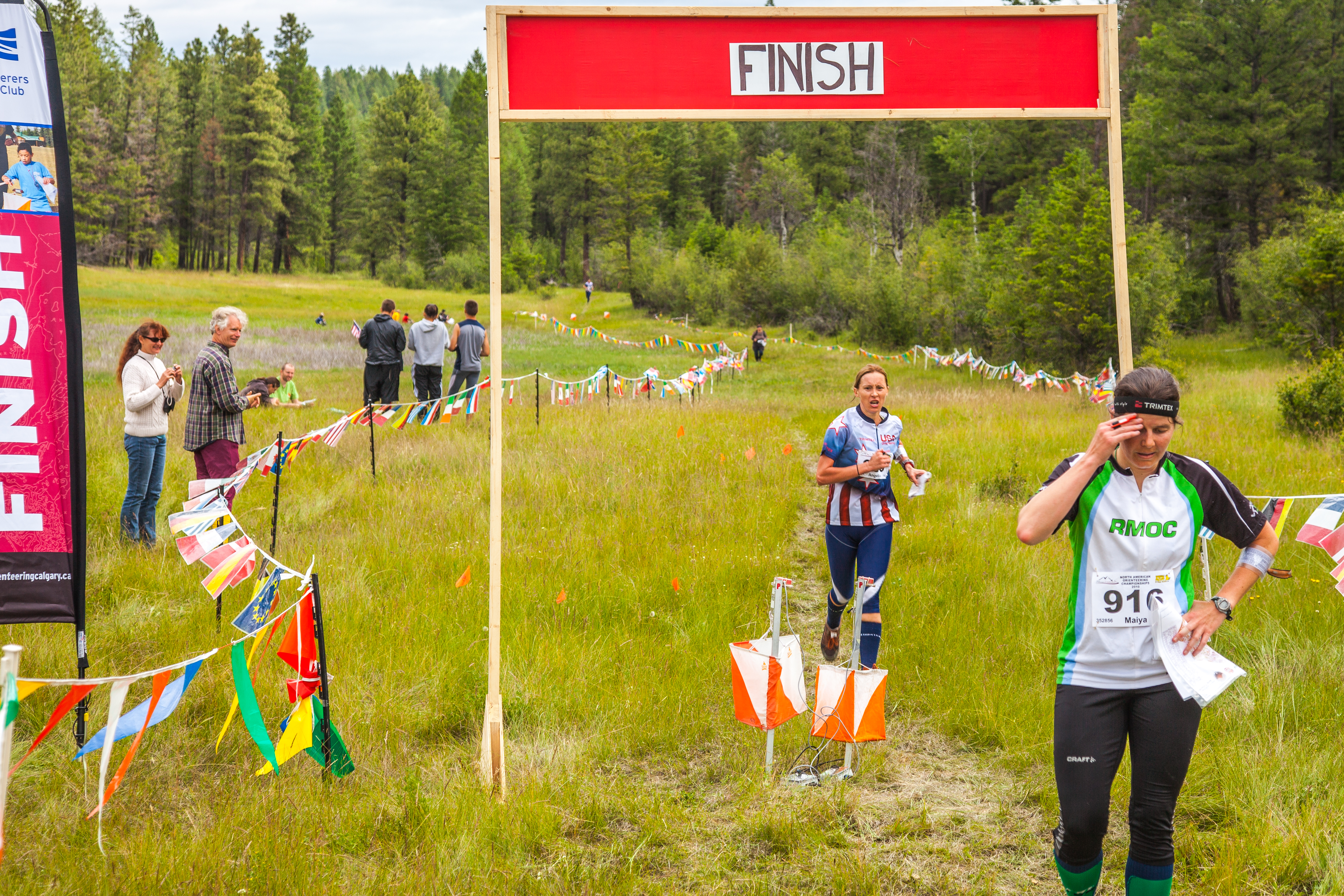
- Finish line at the 2010 NAOC in Cranbrook, British Columbia
- Status: active
- Genre: sports event
- Date: May—November
- Frequency: biennial
- Venue: various
- Location: various
- Country: Canada, United States
- Inaugurated: 1971
- Previous event: 2024
- Next event: 2026
- Organiser: IOF, Orienteering Canada, Orienteering USA
- Website: https://www.cal-o-fest.com

The North American Orienteering Championships (NAOC) is a biennial orienteering event organized by the International Orienteering Federation.

Originally, the North American Orienteering Championships consisted of just two forest races. The competition was held in odd-numbered years until 1977, after which it changed to even numbered years starting in 1980. A sprint race was added to the program in 2006. The event's location always alternates between Canada and the United States. The NAOC has been held in conjunction with other orienteering competitions such as the Canadian Orienteering Championships (1990, 1998, 2018, 2024) and the Asia-Pacific Orienteering Championships (1990, 2002).

The current championship events are a long distance, middle distance, sprint distance, and either a forest relay or sprint relay. The events can take place in any order. The competition has open age and gender categories as well as an elite category. Throughout the competition, points earned by Canadian and American competitors in the elite categories are added up. The team with the most points is declared the winner and is awarded the Bjorn Kjellstrom Cup, first awarded in 1980.

Competition format
Distance	Winning Time	Notes
Long distance	70–80 min (women); 90–100 min (men)	
Middle distance	30–35 min	
Sprint	12–15 min	
Forest Relay	105–135 min	Three-person teams
Sprint Relay	55–60 min	Mixed four-person teams

== Venues and winning teams ==
Year	Dates	Location	Host Club(s)	Winning team
1971	6—7 November	(United States) Dumfries, Virginia	Quantico Orienteering Club	
1973	1—2 September	(Canada) Gatineau Park, Quebec	Ottawa Orienteering Club	
1975	24—25 May	(United States) Bear Brook State Park, New Hampshire	New England Orienteering Club	
1977	8—9 October	(Canada) Lachute, Quebec	Ramblers Orienteering Club	
1980	1—2 November	(United States) Brecksville Reservation, Ohio	Northeast Ohio Orienteering Club	Canada
1982	21—22 August	(Canada) Carberry, Manitoba	Manitoba Orienteering Association	United States
1984	6—7 October	(United States) Harriman State Park, New York	Hudson Valley Orienteering Club	Canada
1986	16—17 August	(Canada) Milton and Barrie, Ontario	Hamilton King's Foresters	Canada
1988	29—30 October	(United States) Hickory Run State Park, Pennsylvania	Delaware Valley Orienteering Club	Canada
1990	11—12 August	(Canada) Caroline, Alberta	Alberta Orienteering Association; Edmonton Overlanders Orienteering Club	Canada
1992	7—8 November	(United States) Prince William Forest Park, Virginia	Quantico Orienteering Club	Canada
1994	20—21 August	(Canada) Barrie, Ontario	Hamilton King's Foresters	Canada
1996	19—20 October	(United States) Meramec State Park, Missouri	St. Louis Orienteering Club	Canada
1998	2—3 August	(Canada) Bonaparte Provincial Park and Merritt, British Columbia	Sage Orienteering Club	Canada
2000	28—29 October	(United States) Harriman State Park, New York	Hudson Valley Orienteering	Canada
2002	13—14 July	(Canada) Dalmuir, Alberta	Foothills Wanderes Orienteering Club; Edmonton Overlanders Orienteering Club	Canada
2004	29—30 May	(United States) Cleveland, Ohio	Northeast Ohio Orienteering Club	Canada
2006	6—9 October	(Canada) Hamilton and Milton, Ontario	Golden Horseshoe Orienteering	Canada
2008	26—28 September	(United States) Altmar and Fayetteville, New York	Central New York Orienteering	Canada
2010	2—4 July	(Canada) Cranbrook, British Columbia	Kootenay Orienteering Club; Foothills Wanderers Orienteering Club; Greater Vancouver Orienteering Club	United States
2012	18—21 October	(United States) Delaware Water Gap, Pennsylvania	Delaware Valley Orienteering Club	United States
2014	10—13 October	(Canada) Arnprior, Ontario	Orienteering Ottawa	United States
2016	23—25 September	(United States) Hanover, New Hampshire	Orienteering USA	Canada
2018	18—21 August	(Canada) Whitehorse and Carcross, Yukon	Yukon Orienteering Association	United States
~~2020~~	Not held due to the COVID-19 pandemic			
~~2022~~	Not held due to the COVID-19 pandemic			
2023	28–31 July	(United States) Truckee, California	Bay Area Orienteering Club; Cascade Orienteering Club	United States
2024	6—11 August	(Canada) Kingston and Calabogie, Ontario	Orienteering Ottawa	Canada
2026	28 December 2026—2 January 2027	(United States) Cochise County and Tucson, Arizona	Tucson Orienteering	
