= Odd Hopp =

Norwegian orienteer and scout leader

- Born: 15 August 1913
- Died: 21 July 2001 (aged 87)
- Occupations: Scout leader, orienteer, sports official
- Known for: Secretary general of the Norwegian Boy Scout Organization
- Awards: Bronze Wolf Award; Silver World Award

Odd E. Hopp (born 15 August 1913 – 21 July 2001) was a Norwegian Scout leader, orienteer and sports official.

== Early and personal life ==
Hopp was the son of Georg B. Hopp and Klara Gustave Ruud, and was married to Eva Marit Eimstad. He graduated from Oslo Handelsgymnasium in 1931, and was appointed at Norges Varemesse from 1931, Silkehuset from 1932, Oslo Lysverker from 1934, and Holger Fangel & Co from 1941.

== Career ==
Hopp served as secretary general of the Norwegian Boy Scout Organization from 1945. As a sports administrator of orienteering, he chaired Stor-Oslo O-krets (the Orienteering region chapter of the Greater Oslo Region) from 1945 to 1949, and chaired Norges Orienteringsforbund from 1953 to 1957. He chaired Statens Ungdomsråd from 1956 to 1970.

He was a member of the advisory council of the Norwegian Trekking Association from 1970.

For his contributions to Scouting, he received the Bronze Wolf Award in 1971, and the Silver World Award in 1975.

== Selected works ==
- Speiderguttboka
