= Deutscher Turner Bund, Abteilung Sport Orientierungslauf =

German Orienteering association

- Type: Orienteering federation
- Region served: Germany
- Website: http://www.orientierungslauf.de

Deutscher Turner Bund, Abteilung Sport Orientierungslauf is the national Orienteering Association in Germany. It is recognized as the orienteering association for Germany by the International Orienteering Federation, of which it is a member.

== History ==
Both East and West Germany were among the ten founding members of the International Orienteering Federation in 1961. West Germany participated in the first European Orienteering Championships in 1962. East Germany was not allowed to participate in 1962, due to international political sanctions (which included visa denial) after construction of the Berlin Wall, but could participate in the next championships in 1964. The 1970 World Orienteering Championships were held in Friedrichroda, East Germany. The 1995 World Championships in foot orienteering were hosted in Detmold, Germany.

== See also ==
- German orienteers
