= Slovak Orienteering Association =

Governing body of orienteering in Slovakia

Slovak Orienteering Association (SZOŠ)
- Region served: Slovakia
- Website: http://www.orienteering.sk/

The Slovak Orienteering Association is the national Orienteering Association in Slovakia. It is recognized as the orienteering association for the Slovakia by the International Orienteering Federation, of which it is a member.

== See also ==
- Slovak orienteers
