= Croatian Orienteering Federation =

Governing body of orienteering in Croatia

- Founded: 2005
- Type: Orienteering club
- Region served: Croatia

The Croatian Orienteering Federation (Croatian: Hrvatski orijentacijski savez) is the national Orienteering Association in Croatia. It is recognized as the orienteering association for Croatia by the International Orienteering Federation, of which it is a full member. It is also a member of the Croatian Olympic Committee.
