= Serbian Orienteering Federation =

Governing body of orienteering in Serbia

- Type: Orienteering Federation
- Region served: Serbia
- Website: www.orijentiring.rs

The Serbian Orienteering Federation (Serbian: Оријентиринг Савез Србије (ОСС)/Orijentiring Savez Srbije (OSS)) is the national Orienteering Association in Serbia. It is recognized as the orienteering association for Serbia by the International Orienteering Federation, of which it is a member.
