= Russian Orienteering Federation =

Governing body of orienteering in Russia

- Region served: Russia
- Website: http://rufso.ru/

The Russian Orienteering Federation (Федерация спортивного ориентирования (ФСО)) is the Russian national organisation of orienteering. It is a suspended Member of the International Orienteering Federation.

After the 2022 Russian invasion of Ukraine, the International Orienteering Federation suspended the membership of the Russian Orienteering Federation. The IOF also disallowed Russian orienteering athletes from participating in IOF events, even as neutral athletes, cancelled all organising rights for IOF events and activities in Russia, and suspended all Russian members appointed to IOF official bodies.

== See also ==
- Russian orienteers
