= French Orienteering Federation =

Governing body of orienteering in France

Fédération Française de Course d'Orientation
- Founded: 1970
- Type: Orienteering Federation
- Region served: France
- Website: https://www.ffcorientation.fr/

The French Orienteering Federation (French: Fédération Française de Course d'Orientation) (FFCO) is the national orienteering Federation of France. It is a full member of the International Orienteering Federation.

== History ==
The French Orienteering Federation was founded in 1970, and joined the International Orienteering Federation the same year. France participated in the World Orienteering Championships first time in 1976. The 1987 World Championships were held in Gérardmer, France, and the 2011 World Championships were held in Savoie. In 1992, the World Ski Orienteering Championships were hosted in Pontarlier, and the 2002 World MTB Orienteering Championships were held in Fontainebleau, France.

== See also ==
- French orienteers
