= Orienteering Association of Hong Kong, China =

Governing body of orienteering in Hong Kong

- Founded: 1981
- Type: Orienteering club
- Location: So Kon Po, Hong Kong
- Region served: Hong Kong
- Website: https://www.oahk.org.hk/

Orienteering Association of Hong Kong, China (OAHK) is the HSK organisation responsible for orienteering in Hong Kong. It is a Full Member of the International Orienteering Federation.

Currently, OAHK sends Hong Kong teams to participate in World Orienteering Championships, Junior World Orienteering Championships, World Trail Orienteering Championships, Asian Orienteering Championships and All China Orienteering Championships, and organises the Hong Kong Annual Orienteering Championships in Hong Kong every year.
