= Ukrainian Orienteering Federation =

National organization of orienteering

- Type: Orienteering club
- Region served: Ukraine
- Website: http://www.orienteering.org.ua/

Ukrainian Orienteering Federation is the Ukrainian national organisation of orienteering. It is a full member of the International Orienteering Federation.
