= Elizabeth Murray Bourne =

Conservationist

Elizabeth Murray Bourne OAM
- Known for: Conservation and Environment

Elizabeth Murray Bourne is an Australian conservationist who was awarded an Order of Australia for services to conservation and the environment in 2024.

== Career ==
Bourne was Principal Research Officer, for the Minister for Environment and Heritage in Queensland Parliament, from 1989 to 1995.

Bourne served as Promotion and Development Officer since 2001 for Orienteering Queensland Inc. She organized the Orienteer of the Year Event in multiple years, from 2012, to 2021. Additionally, Bourne has coordinated the Queensland Long Distance Championships between 2004 and 2021.

Bourne worked on the Queensland Middle Distance Championships in 2013. Bourne worked in the marketing and publicity efforts of events like the Queensland Long Distance Championships and the Christmas Five Day Carnival in 2001, as well as the Asian and Pacific Orienteering Carnival from 1997 to 2000.

Bourne was awarded Life Membership to Orienteering Queensland in 2001.

== Awards ==
- 2024 – Order of Australia medal.
