= International Orienteering Federation =

International sports governing body organizing orienteering

- Abbreviation: IOF
- Formation: May 21, 1961; 65 years ago
- Type: Federation of national sports associations
- Headquarters: Drottninggatan 47; SE-65225 Karlstad; Sweden
- Region served: Worldwide
- Members: 78 national federations
- President: Tom Hollowell
- CEO: Henrik Eliasson
- Secretary General: Sondre Sande Gullord
- Affiliations: International Olympic Committee
- Website: orienteering.sport

The International Orienteering Federation (IOF) is the international governing body of the sport of orienteering. The IOF head office is located in Karlstad, Sweden. The IOF governs four orienteering disciplines: foot orienteering, mountain bike orienteering, ski orienteering, and trail orienteering.

After the 2022 Russian invasion of Ukraine, the International Orienteering Federation suspended the membership of the Russian Orienteering Federation. The IOF also disallowed Russian orienteering athletes from participating in IOF events, even as neutral athletes, cancelled all organising rights for IOF events and activities in Russia, and suspended all Russian members appointed to IOF official bodies.

== History ==
The IOF was founded on 21 May 1961 at a Congress held in Copenhagen, Denmark by the orienteering national federations of Bulgaria, Czechoslovakia, Denmark, the Federal Republic of Germany, the German Democratic Republic, Finland, Hungary, Norway, Sweden and Switzerland. By 1969, the IOF represented 16 countries, including its first two non-European member federations representing Japan and Canada, and in 1977 the IOF was recognised by the International Olympic Committee.

After the 2022 Russian invasion of Ukraine, the International Orienteering Federation suspended the membership of the Russian Orienteering Federation. The IOF also disallowed Russian orienteering athletes from participating in IOF events, even as neutral athletes, cancelled all organising rights for IOF events and activities in Russia, and suspended all Russian members appointed to IOF official bodies.

== Events ==
=== Global ===
1. World Foot Orienteering Championships since 1966.
2. World Ski Orienteering Championships since 1975.
3. World Mountain Bike Orienteering Championships since 2002.
4. World Trail Orienteering Championships since 2004.
5. Junior World Orienteering Championships since 1990.
6. World Masters Orienteering Championships since 1983.
7. World University Orienteering Championships since 1978.
8. Junior World Ski Orienteering Championships since 1994.
9. Orienteering at the World Games since 2001.
10. Orienteering World Cup since 1986.
11. World Cup in Ski Orienteering since 1989.

=== Continental ===
1. European Orienteering Championships since 1962-1964 and 2000.
2. European Youth Orienteering Championships since 2002.
3. European University Orienteering Championships
4. North American Orienteering Championships since 1971.
5. Asian Orienteering Championships (Seniors and Masters and Junior and Youth and Trail) since 2008.
6. Southeast Asian Orienteering Championships
7. African Orienteering Championships
8. Ocean Orienteering Championships

=== Open ===
1. Tiomila since 1945 in Sweden.
2. Jukola relay since 1949 in Finland.
3. O-Ringen since 1965 in Sweden.
4. Kainuu Orienteering Week since 1967 in Finland.
5. Jan Kjellström International Festival of Orienteering since 1967 in United Kingdom.
6. Thailand International Orienteering Championships

== Membership ==
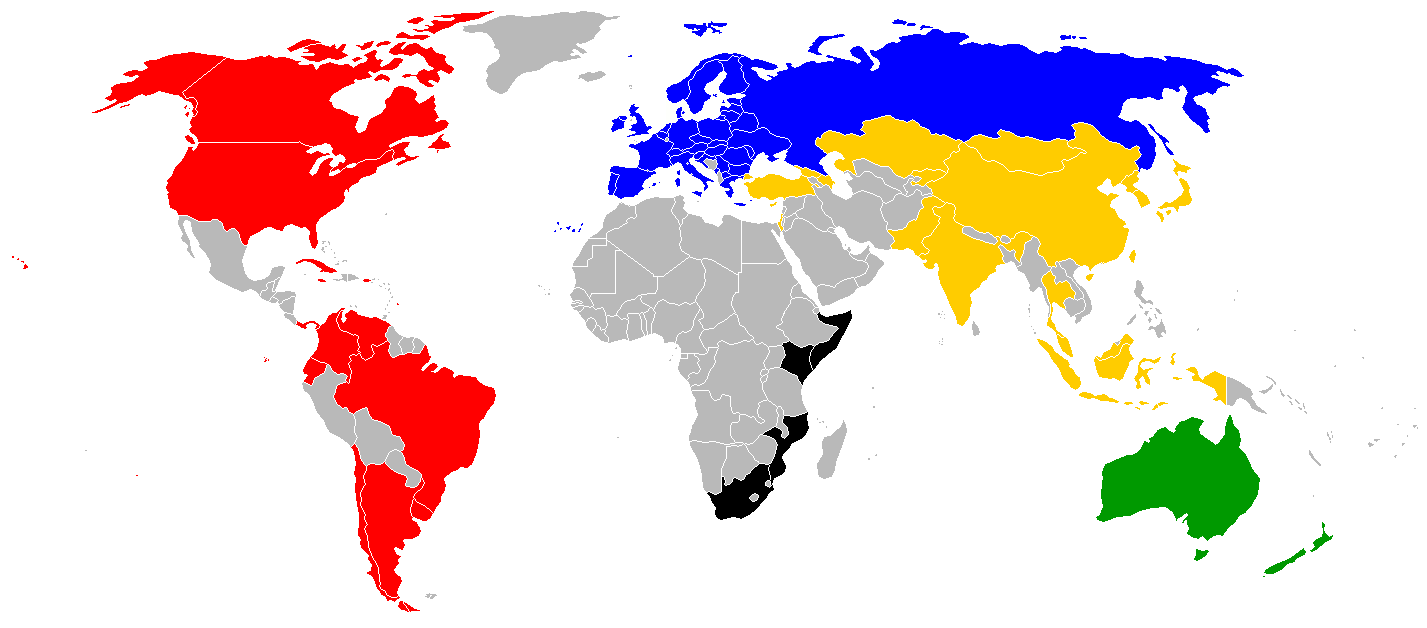
Map of the members of the IOF according to their region.

As of January 2016, the membership of the IOF comprised 80 national orienteering federations, of which 56 were members, 24 were provisional members, divided into six geographical regions.

=== Africa ===
6 Members, 1 Provisional Member

- Cameroon
- Egypt
- Kenya
- Mozambique
- Somalia
- South Africa
- Uganda

=== Asia ===
17 Members, 1 Provisional Member

- China
- Chinese Taipei
- Hong Kong
- India
- Indonesia
- Iran
- Japan
- Kazakhstan
- Kyrgyzstan
- Malaysia
- Macau
- Nepal
- North Korea
- Philippines
- South Korea
- Singapore
- Thailand

=== Europe ===
40 Members (2 currently suspended), 1 Provisional Member

- Austria
- Azerbaijan
- Belgium
- Belarus (suspended since Mar 2022)
- Bulgaria
- Croatia
- Cyprus
- Czech Republic
- Denmark
- Estonia
- Finland
- France
- (Georgia (country)) Georgia
- Germany
- (United Kingdom) Great Britain
- Greece
- Hungary
- (Republic of Ireland) Ireland
- Israel
- Italy
- Latvia
- Liechtenstein
- Lithuania
- Luxembourg
- Moldova
- Montenegro
- Netherlands
- North Macedonia
- Norway
- Poland
- Portugal
- Romania
- Russia (suspended since Feb 2022)
- Serbia
- Slovakia
- Slovenia
- Spain
- Sweden
- Switzerland
- Turkey
- Ukraine

=== North America ===
5 Members

- Barbados
- Canada
- Jamaica
- Puerto Rico
- United States

=== Oceania ===
2 Members

- Australia
- New Zealand

=== South America ===
9 Members

- Argentina
- Brazil
- Chile
- Colombia
- Cuba
- Ecuador
- Panama
- Uruguay
- Venezuela

== Governance structure ==
The IOF is governed by an elected Council consisting of a President, a Senior Vice President, two Vice Presidents, and seven other Council members. Day-to-day operations of the IOF are the shared responsibility of the IOF CEO and Secretary General through the IOF Office.

Several standing commissions of the IOF are responsible for the development of the sport worldwide; these commissions include: Foot Orienteering, MTB Orienteering, Ski Orienteering, Trail Orienteering, Environment, IT, Map, Medical, Rules and an Athletes' Commission.

=== Presidents ===
Sources:

- Erik Tobé (1961—1975)
- Lasse Heideman (1975—1982)
- Bengt Saltin (1982—1988)
- Heinz Tschudin (1988—1994)
- Sue Harvey (1994—2004)
- Åke Jacobson (2004—2012)
- Brian Porteous (2012—2016)
- Leho Haldna (2016—2024)
- Tom Hollowell (2024—)

== Affiliations ==
Since 1977, the IOF has been recognised by the International Olympic Committee.

The IOF is also a member of the following organisations:

- Association of IOC Recognised International Sports Federations (ARISF)
- International World Games Association (IWGA)
- International Masters Games Association (IMGA)
- SportAccord

== Publications ==
The IOF used to publish a wide variety of journals and reference works related to the sport. These include Orienteering World, an annual magazine, The Scientific Journal of Orienteering, the OZine. Official editions of the rules of IOF sanctioned orienteering and specifications for orienteering maps are still published at regular intervals.
