= Estonian Orienteering Federation =

Sports governing body in Estonia

- Founded: 16 of December 1962
- Type: Orienteering club
- Region served: Estonia
- Website: http://www.orienteerumine.ee/

The Estonian Orienteering Federation (Estonian: Eesti Orienteerumisliit) is the national Orienteering Federation of Estonia. It is recognized as the orienteering federation for Estonia by the International Orienteering Federation, it became a member on 27 September 1991.

== See also ==
- Estonian orienteers
