= Český svaz orientačních sportů =

Governing body of orienteering in the Czech Republic

Český svaz orientačních sportů (ČSOS)
- Region served: Czech Republic
- Website: http://www.orientacnisporty.cz/

The Český svaz orientačních sportů (ČSOS) (Czech Orienteering Federation) is the national Orienteering Association in Czech Republic. It is recognized as the orienteering association for the Czech Republic by the International Orienteering Federation, of which it is a member.

== History ==
Czechoslovakia was among the ten founding members of the International Orienteering Federation in 1961 and participated in the first European Orienteering Championships in 1962. The 1972 World Orienteering Championships were held in Doksy, and the 1991 championships were held in Mariánské Lázně in then Czechoslovakia (current Czech Republic). The 2008 World Championships were hosted in Olomouc in the Czech Republic.

In 2012, the Czech Republic won gold medals in the men's relay in the World Championships.

== See also ==
- Czech orienteers
