= World Masters Orienteering Championships =

International orienteering competition

- Status: active
- Genre: sporting event
- Date: July–August
- Frequency: annual
- Location: various
- Inaugurated: 1983
- Previous event: 2025
- Next event: 2026
- Organiser: International Orienteering Federation

The World Masters Orienteering Championships (WMOC) (formerly the Veteran World Cup) is an annual orienteering competition organized by the International Orienteering Federation (IOF).

Participants must be 35 years of age or older. The classes of competition are divided into women and men in five-year age groups from 35 to 100+ with a total of 28 classes.

The first competition was held in 1983 in Lahti, Finland. However, the event was not sanctioned by the IOF until 1988. From 1986 to 1994, the competition was held biannually. In 1998, the event changed its name to the World Masters Orienteering Championships.

Until 2008, the competition consisted of a long ("classic") distance race with 2 qualification runs, after which a sprint race was added to the program. In 2018, a middle-distance race was added as well. The competition format now consists of: Sprint Qualification, Sprint Final, Forest Qualification, Middle Final, Long Final.

== Venues ==
Year	Date	Location
1983	July 12–15	Lahti, Finland
1986	July 15–18	Mysen, Norway
1988	July 19–22	Åmål, Sweden
1990	August 1–5	Körmend, Hungary
1992	January 5–11	Tasmania, Australia
1994	August 1–5	Strathspey, United Kingdom
1995	May 29 – June 2	Saint Petersburg, Russia
1996	April 8–12	Murcia, Spain
1997	September 29 – October 4	Minnesota, United States
1998	July 1–5	Nový Bor, Czech Republic
1999	July 18–23	Aarhus, Denmark
2000	January 1–7	Feilding, New Zealand
2001	July 1–5	Nida, Lithuania
2002	October 6–11	Bendigo, Australia
2003	July 13–17	Halden, Norway
2004	July 3–10	Asiago, Italy
2005	July 22–31	Edmonton, Canada
2006	July 1–8	Wiener Neustadt, Austria
2007	July 7–14	Kuusamo, Finland
2008	June 28 – July 5	Marinha Grande, Portugal
2009	October 10–18	Sydney, Australia
2010	July 31 – August 7	Neuchâtel, Switzerland
2011	July 1–8	Pécs, Hungary
2012	July 1–7	Bad Harzburg, Germany
2013	August 2–10	Sestriere, Italy
2014	November 1–8	Porto Alegre, Brazil
2015	July 27 – August 1	Gothenburg, Sweden
2016	August 7–13	Tallinn, Estonia
2017	April 21–30	Auckland, New Zealand
2018	July 7–13	Copenhagen, Denmark
2019	July 5–12	Riga, Latvia
~~2020~~	Cancelled due to the COVID-19 pandemic	
2021	August 7—13	Velence, Hungary
2022	July 9—16	Gargano, Italy
2023	August 11—18	Košice, Slovakia
2024	August 2–9	Turku, Finland
2025	August 8–15	Girona, Spain
2026	August 7–14	Rzeszów, Poland
2027	May 21—29	Kansai, Japan
2028	October 27 - November 3	(Turkey) Antalya, Türkiye
2029	TBD	Mariánské Lázně, Czech Republic
