= Orienteering Canada =

Governing body of orienteering in Canada

- Sport: Orienteering
- Jurisdiction: Canada
- Founded: 1967
- Affiliation: IOF
- Regional affiliation: North America
- Headquarters: Calgary, Alberta, Canada
- President: Erik Blake

Official website
- www.orienteering.ca
- (Canada)

Orienteering Canada, formerly known as the Canadian Orienteering Federation (COF), is the governing body of orienteering in Canada. It is recognized by the International Orienteering Federation, of which it is a member.

== History ==
Orienteering Canada, was founded in 1967 as the Canadian Orienteering Federation and initially consisted of three member associations, those of Ontario, Quebec, and Nova Scotia. The following year, Orienteering Canada became a member of the International Orienteering Federation and the first Canadian Orienteering Championships were held in Gatineau Park, Quebec on August 10. In 1972, Canada sent its first team to the World Orienteering Championships (WOC) in Staré Splavy, Czech Republic. By 1975, Orienteering Canada consisted of 8 provincial associations. As of 2024, there are eight provincial associations and one territorial association. In 1976, Orienteering Quebec organized "O' Ring", the first international orienteering competition held outside of Europe which attracted over 900 participants. In 2012, the organization formally changed its name to Orienteering Canada.

On top of organizing the Canadian Orienteering Championships each year, Orienteering Canada has hosted several major orienteering competitions including the Orienteering World Cup (1978, 1990, 1992), the Asia-Pacific Orienteering Championships (1990, 2002), and the North American Orienteering Championships which they have hosted every four years since 1973.

== Affiliated clubs ==
=== Current ===
Club name	Locale	Province/Territory
Accro O Sport	Granby	Quebec
Annapolis Valley Orienteering Club	Annapolis Valley	Nova Scotia
Azimut Laurentides	Morin-Heights	Quebec
Cariboo Chilcotin Orienteering Club	Williams Lake	British Columbia
Club de courses d’aventure et d’orientation de la Gaspésie	Gaspé	Quebec
DontGetLost Adventure Running	Golden Horseshoe (Hamilton, Halton Region, Guelph, Niagara Region)	Ontario
Edmonton Overlanders Orienteering Club	Edmonton	Alberta
Foothills Orienteering	Calgary	Alberta
Greater Vancouver Orienteering Club	Vancouver	British Columbia
Halifax Orienteering Club	Halifax	Nova Scotia
Kootenay Orienteering Club	East Kootenay (Cranbrook, Kimberley)	British Columbia
Manitoba Orienteering Association	Manitoba	Manitoba
Coureurs de Bois Orienteering Club	Winnipeg	Manitoba
Orienteering New Brunswick	New Brunswick	New Brunswick
Orienteering Ottawa	Gatineau	Quebec
Orienteering Ottawa	Ottawa	Ontario
Orienteering P.E.I.*	Prince Edward Island	Prince Edward Island
Ramblers Orienteering Club	Montreal	Quebec
Sage Orienteering Club	Southern Interior (Salmon Arm, Vernon, Kamloops, Kelowna, Revelstoke)	British Columbia
Saskatchewan Orienteering Association	Saskatchewan	Saskatchewan
Stars Orienteering Club	Kitchener-Waterloo-Cambridge	Ontario
Toronto Orienteering Club	Toronto	Ontario
Ukrainian Orienteering Club	Toronto	Ontario
Victoria Orienteering	Victoria	British Columbia
Yukon Orienteering Association	Whitehorse	Yukon

*Chapter of Orienteering New Brunswick

=== Defunct ===
Club name	Locale	Province/Territory
Azimut Orienteering Club	Montreal	Quebec
Campden Orienteering Club	Campden	Ontario
Cowichan Valley Orienteering Club	Vancouver Island	British Columbia
Credit Valley Orienteering Club	Toronto	Ontario
Don Valley Orienteering Club	Toronto	Ontario
Falcons Orienteering Club	Moncton	New Brunswick
Feux Follets	Sherbrooke	Quebec
Finnish Orienteering Club	Toronto	Ontario
Forest Adventurers	London	Ontario
Grand Falls Orienteering Club	Grand Falls-Windsor	Newfoundland and Labrador
Guelph Gators Orienteering	Guelph	Ontario
Hamilton King's Foresters	Hamilton	Ontario
Hartney Gougers Orienteering Club	Hartney	Manitoba
Halifax Hustlers Orienteering Club	Halifax	Nova Scotia
Humber Valley Orienteering Club	Toronto	Ontario
Laurentian Orienteering Club	Sudbury	Ontario
Loup Garou Orienteering Club	Gatineau	Quebec
Loup Garou Orienteering Club	Ottawa	Ontario
Neepawa Orienteering Club	Neepawa	Manitoba
Niagara Orienteering Club	Niagara Region	Ontario
Parkland Orienteering Club	Red Deer	Alberta
Pasadena Orienteering Club	Corner Brook	Newfoundland and Labrador
Prince George Orienteering Club	Prince George	British Columbia
St. John's Orienteering Club	St. John's	Newfoundland and Labrador
Trackers Orienteering Club	Dartmouth	Nova Scotia
