= Danish Orienteering Federation =

Governing body of orienteering in Denmark

- Founded: 1941
- Type: Orienteering federation
- Location: Idrættens Hus
- Region served: Denmark
- Key people: Helge Søgård
- Website: http://www.do-f.dk

The Danish Orienteering Federation (Danish: Dansk Orienterings-Forbund; DOF) is the national Orienteering Association in Denmark. It is recognized as the orienteering association for Denmark by the International Orienteering Federation, of which it is a member.

== History ==
The Danish Orienteering Federation was founded in 1941. It was among the ten founding members of the International Orienteering Federation in 1961, and Denmark participated in the first European Orienteering Championships in 1962. Denmark hosted the world championships in 1974, and again in 2006. The Danish male team won gold medals in the relay at the 1997 World Orienteering Championships. Among Danish individual world champions in foot orienteering are Mona Nørgaard and Søren Bobach.

== See also ==
- Danish orienteers
