= Hungarian Orienteering Federation =

Governing body of orienteering in Hungary

- Magyar Tájékozódási Futó Szövetség
- Type: Orienteering federation
- Location: Budapest
- Region served: Hungary
- Website: www.mtfsz.hu

The Hungarian Orienteering Federation (Hungarian: Magyar Tájékozódási Futó Szövetség, pronounced [ˈmɒɟɒr ˈtaːjeːkozoːdaːʃi ˈfutoː ˈsøvɛt͡ʃːeːɡ], MTFSZ) is the governing body for orienteering in Hungary. It is recognized as Hungary's national orienteering association by the International Orienteering Federation (IOF), of which it is a member.

== History ==
The federation was established in 1957, and was among the ten founding members of IOF in 1961.

The Hungarian Orienteering Federation hosted the World Orienteering Championships in 1983, when the championships were held in Zalaegerszeg in western Hungary. They also hosted the world championships in 2009.

Hungary first participated in international orienteering championship in 1962. Their female team won a silver medal in the relay at the 1970 World Orienteering Championships, and a bronze medal in 1976, and the men's team won a bronze medal in 1972. Among Hungarian individual world champions are Sarolta Monspart (1972), Katalin Oláh (1991 and 1995).

== See also ==
- Hungarian orienteers
