= Turkish Orienteering Federation =

Governing body of orienteering in Turkey

- Founder: 2002
- Type: Orienteering club
- Region served: Turkey
- Website: http://oryantiring.org.tr

The Turkish Orienteering Federation is the national orienteering association in Turkey. Founded in 2002, it is recognized as the orienteering association for Turkey by the International Orienteering Federation, of which it is a member.
