= Belgian Orienteering Federation =

Governing body of orienteering in Belgium

- Sport: Orienteering
- Jurisdiction: Belgium
- Abbreviation: ABSO-BVOS
- Affiliation: IOF
- Regional affiliation: Europe

Official website
- www.orienteering.be
- (Belgium)

Belgian Orienteering Federation ABSO-BVOS is the national Orienteering Association in Belgium. It is recognized as the orienteering association for Belgium by the International Orienteering Federation, of which it is a member.

ABSO-BVOS stands for "Association Belge des Sports d'Orientation" - "Belgische Vereniging voor OriëntatieSporten" and "Belgischer Verband für OrientierungsSporte". So the name combines all the Belgian languages: French, Dutch and German.

The ABSO-BVOS has two members: VVO (Flemish league) and FRSO (French-speaking league). VVO was founded in 1987 and has around 1500 members divided over five orienteering clubs. FRSO has around 1300 members divided over 13 orienteering clubs.

== History ==
Belgium participated in the World Orienteering Championships first time in 1968, and joined the International Orienteering Federation in 1970.

The best performance in the World Orienteering Championships by Belgian athletes, up to 2014, is when Yannick Michiels placed seventh in the sprint final in Italy in 2014.
