= Polish Orienteering Association =

Governing body of orienteering in Poland

- Sport: Orienteering
- Abbreviation: PZOS
- Affiliation: IOF
- Affiliation date: 1967

Official website
- www.orienteering.org.pl
- (Poland)

The Polish Orienteering Association (Polish: Polski Związek Orientacji Sportowej, PZOS) is the Polish national organisation of orienteering. It is a full member of the International Orienteering Federation.

== History ==
The Polish Orienteering Federation was founded in 1960, and joined the International Orienteering Federation in 1967. Poland participated in the World Orienteering Championships first time in 1970.
