= Orienteering Queensland =

Sports organization in Queensland, Australia

Orienteering Queensland is the state-level body promoting orienteering in the state of Queensland, Australia.
