= Finnish Orienteering Federation =

Governing body of orienteering in Finland

- Founded: 1945
- Type: Orienteering club
- Location: Helsinki
- Region served: Finland
- Website: https://www.suunnistusliitto.fi/

The Finnish Orienteering Federation (Finnish: Suomen Suunnistusliitto, SSL, Swedish: Finlands Orienteringsförbund) is the governing body for the sport of orienteering in Finland. The federation was founded in 1945 and has approximately 60,000 members.

The Finnish Orienteering Federation publishes the orienteering magazine Suunnistaja.

== History ==
The Finnish Orienteering Federation was among the ten founding members of IOF in 1961. Finland hosted the very first World Orienteering Championships, in 1966.

The Finnish female team won gold medals in the relay at the 1972, 1978, 1979, 1995, 2001, 2006, 2007, 2008, 2010 and 2011 world championships, and the men's relay team won a gold medal in 2001, and silver medals in 1966, 1968, 1974, 1979, 1995, 1997, 1999, 2003 and 2006. Among Finnish individual world champions in foot orienteering are Kari Sallinen, Jani Lakanen, Janne Salmi, Pasi Ikonen, Mårten Boström, Liisa Veijalainen, Outi Borgenström-Anjala, Kirsi Boström, Minna Kauppi and Heli Jukkola.

== See also ==
- Orienteering in Finland
- Finnish orienteers
