= Swiss Orienteering =

Governing body of orienteering in Switzerland

- Founded: 1978
- Type: Orienteering federation
- Location: Olten
- Region served: Switzerland
- Website: www.solv.ch

Swiss Orienteering is the national Orienteering Association in Switzerland. It is recognized as the orienteering association for Switzerland by the International Orienteering Federation, of which it is a member.

== History ==
Switzerland was among the ten founding members of the International Orienteering Federation in 1961, and participated in the first European Orienteering Championships in 1962. The Swiss Orienteering Federation was founded in 1978. Switzerland hosted the European championships in 1964, the World Orienteering Championships in 1981, and hosted the Junior World Orienteering Championships in 2016.

== See also ==
- Swiss orienteers
