= Irish Orienteering Association =

Governing body for orienteering in Ireland

- Type: Orienteering club
- Region served: Ireland
- Website: www.orienteering.ie

The Irish Orienteering Association (IOA) is the national organisation of orienteering for the Republic of Ireland. It is a full member of the International Orienteering Federation.

== Awards ==
The association bestows three special awards a year:

- Silva Trophy, for the development of orienteering
- Mactire Trophy, for achievement in an orienteering competition
- Silva Award, for administration of an orienteering event
