= Italian Orienteering Federation =

Orienteering organization

Federazione Italiana Sport Orientamento
- Sport: Orienteering
- Jurisdiction: Italy
- Abbreviation: FISO
- Founded: 1986
- Affiliation: IOF
- Regional affiliation: Europe
- Headquarters: Via della Malpensada 84, Trento – Italy
- President: Sergio Anesi
- Secretary: Simonetta Malossini
- Coach: Stefano Raus
- Replaced: CISO – Comitato Italiano Sport Orientamento
- (founded): 1974

Official website
- www.fiso.it
- (Italy)

The Italian Orienteering Federation (Italian: Federazione Italiana Sport Orientamento; FISO) is the national orienteering federation of Italy. It is a full member of the International Orienteering Federation.

== History ==
The Italian Orienteering Federation was founded in 1978, and joined the International Orienteering Federation in 1979. Italy participated in the World Orienteering Championships for the first time in 1981. The 2014 World Championships in foot orienteering were held in the districts of Asiago and Lavarone, Italy.

== See also ==
- Italian orienteers
