= Swedish Orienteering Federation =

Orienteering governing body in Sweden

- Founded: 6 January 1938
- Type: Orienteering federation
- Location: Solna
- Region served: Sweden
- Website: www.svenskorientering.se

The Swedish Orienteering Federation (Swedish: Svenska Orienteringsförbundet, SOFT) is the national orienteering association in Sweden. It is recognized as the national federation for Sweden by the International Orienteering Federation, of which it is a member.

== History ==
The federation was founded on Strömsborg in Stockholm on 6 January 1938. It was among the ten founding members of the International Orienteering Federation in 1961, and Sweden participated in the first European Orienteering Championships in 1962. The 1968 World Orienteering Championships were held in Linköping, Sweden, and in 1971 the Nordic Championships were held in Sundsvall. In 1989 the World Championships were held in Skövde, and in 2004 in Västerås, Sweden.

The Swedish team won the men's relay in the World Championships in 1966, 1968, 1972, 1974, 1976, 1979, 2003 and 2014. The Swedish women's team won the World Championships relay in 1966, 1970, 1974, 1976, 1981, 1983, 1985, 1989, 1991, 1993, 1997 and 2004.

== See also ==
- Swedish orienteers
