= List of forms of racing =

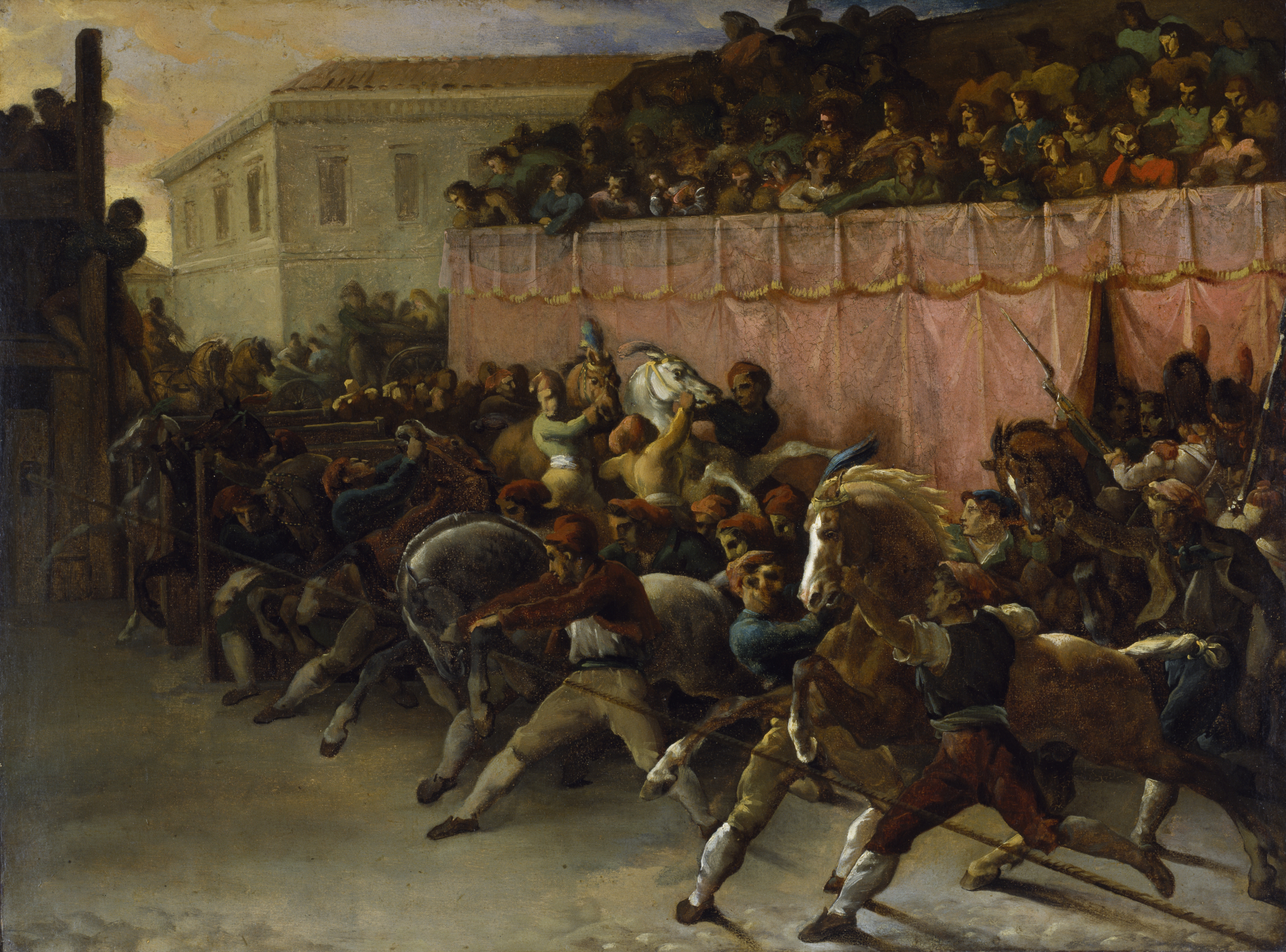
Riderless Racers at Rome by Théodore Géricault. From the mid-15th century until 1882, spring carnival in Rome closed with a horse race.

List of different forms of racing.

== Athletic racing ==
=== Running ===
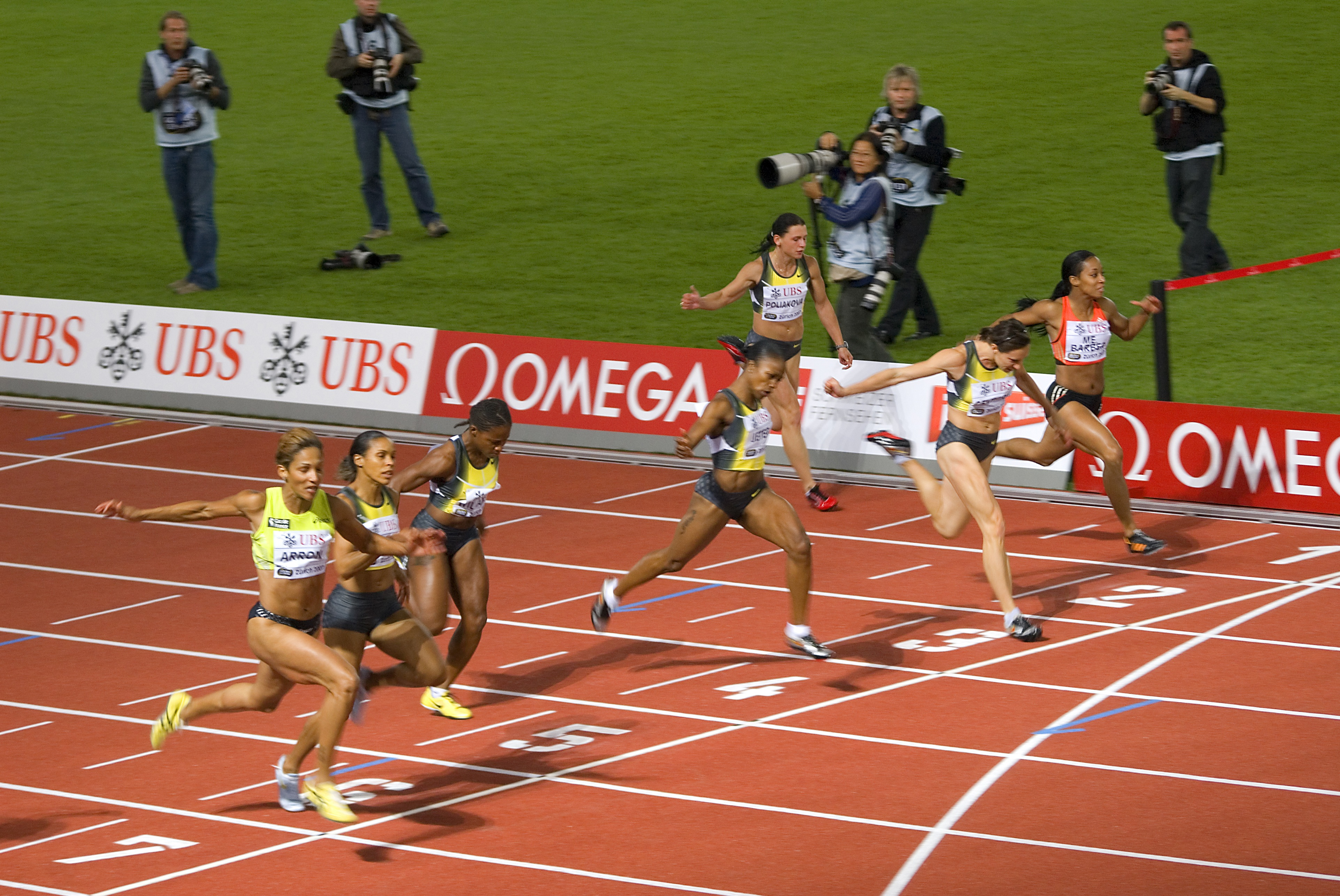
The finish of a women's 100 m race

Running is defined in sporting terms as a gait in which at some point all feet are off the ground at the same time. This is in contrast to walking, where one foot is always in contact with the ground. The term running can refer to any of a variety of speeds ranging from jogging to sprinting. Competitive running grew out of religious festivals in various areas. The origins of the Olympics are shrouded in myth, though the first recorded game took place in 776 BCE. In Gaelic Ireland the Tailteann Games, which featured footraces, are attested from the 6th century CE; medieval chroniclers gave founding dates as early as 1829 BCE.

- Running
  - Cross country running
  - Fell running
  - Road running
  - Track running in track and field
  - Trail running
  - Tower running

=== Walking ===
- Racewalking, a long-distance athletic event where one foot must be in contact with the ground at all times.

== Orienteering ==
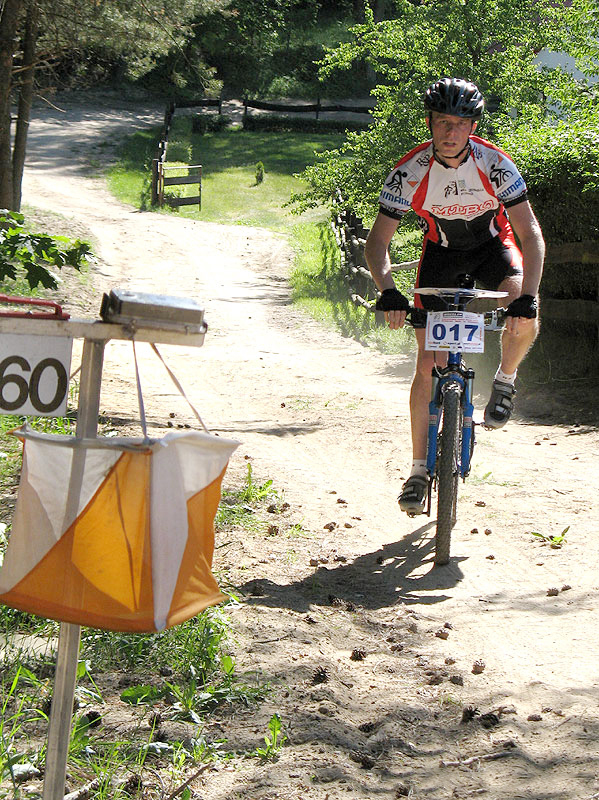
Mountain bike orienteering

Orienteering sports combine navigation with a specific method of travel.

- Foot orienteering, navigation using a map and compass while running across unfamiliar terrain along a course with control points.
- Mountain bike orienteering
- Ski orienteering
- Trail orienteering
- Radio orienteering, combines radio direction finding with orienteering skills. Other variations are Fox Oring and Radio Orienteering in a Compact Area.
- Canoe orienteering
- Mounted orienteering
- Rogaining, cross-country navigation between checkpoints in free order within a time frame.
- SportLabyrinth - micro orienteering
- Mountain marathon, mountain navigation while running off-road over upland country.
- Car orienteering

== Rock climbing ==
- Speed climbing, which can be performed as a race on a standardized, artificial speed climbing wall.

== Swimming ==
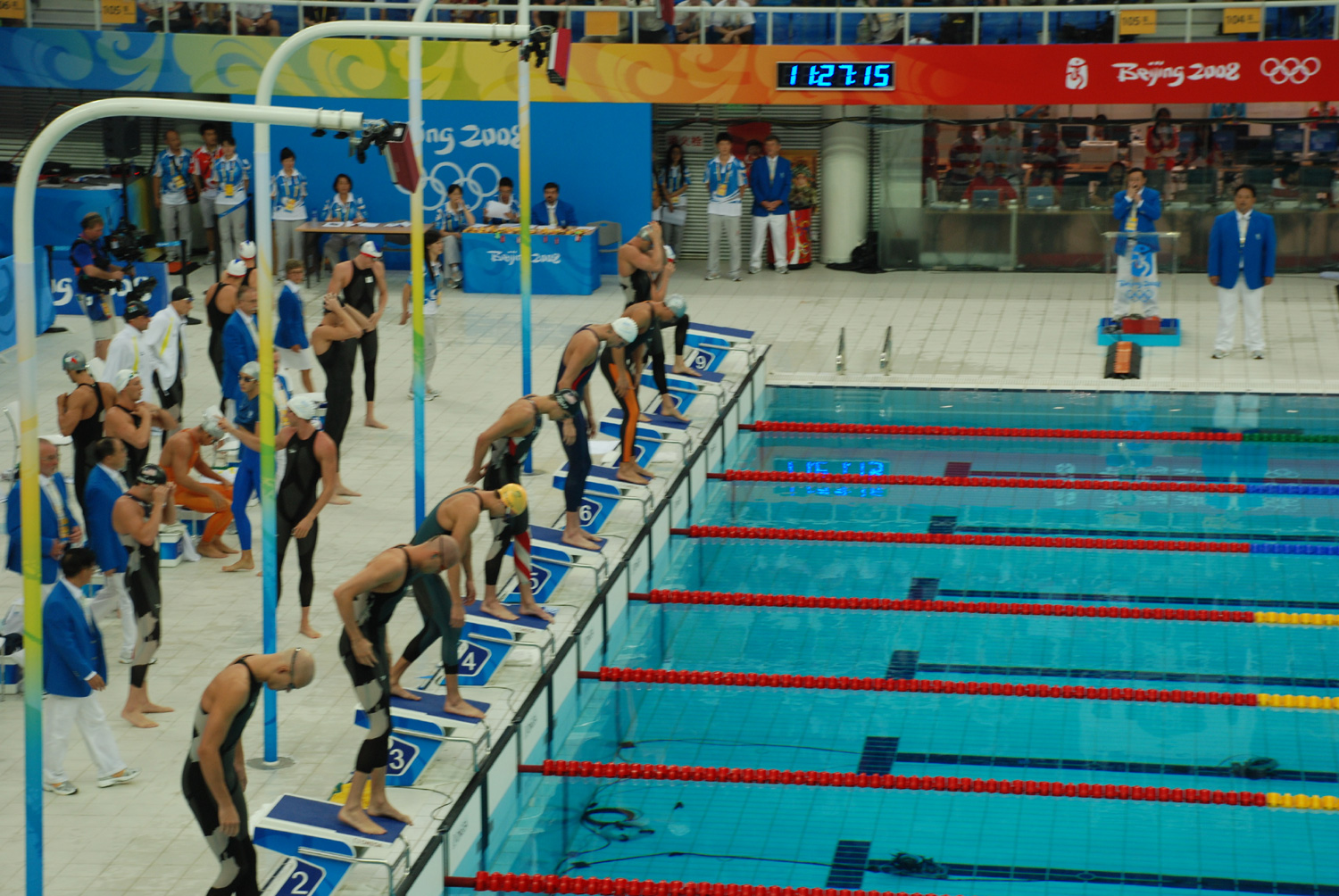
Start of the 4×100 meters relay in the Watercube, Beijing, August 11, 2008

- Swimming
- Paralympic swimming
- Marathon swimming
- Open water swimming

== Board racing ==
- Longboarding
- Sandboarding
- Slalom skateboarding
- Street luge

== Cycling ==
Bicycle racing:

- Track cycling, such as a points race
- Road bicycle racing, such as the Tour de France
- Mountain biking, where a bicycle is ridden off-road
  - Mountain bike orienteering, navigation along off-road trails and tracks
  - Downhill mountain biking
- BMX racing (bicycle motocross)

== Winter racing ==
- Skiing
  - Alpine skiing such as slalom skiing, downhill skiing, giant slalom skiing, super giant slalom skiing, ski cross and speed skiing
  - Cross-country skiing
    - Ski-orienteering, that combines cross-country skiing and orienteering
    - Biathlon, that combines cross-country skiing and rifle shooting
- Snowboard cross
- Skating
  - Speed skating
  - Ice cross downhill
- Sledding
  - Bobsleigh
  - Kicksled
  - Luge
  - Skeleton

== Animal racing ==
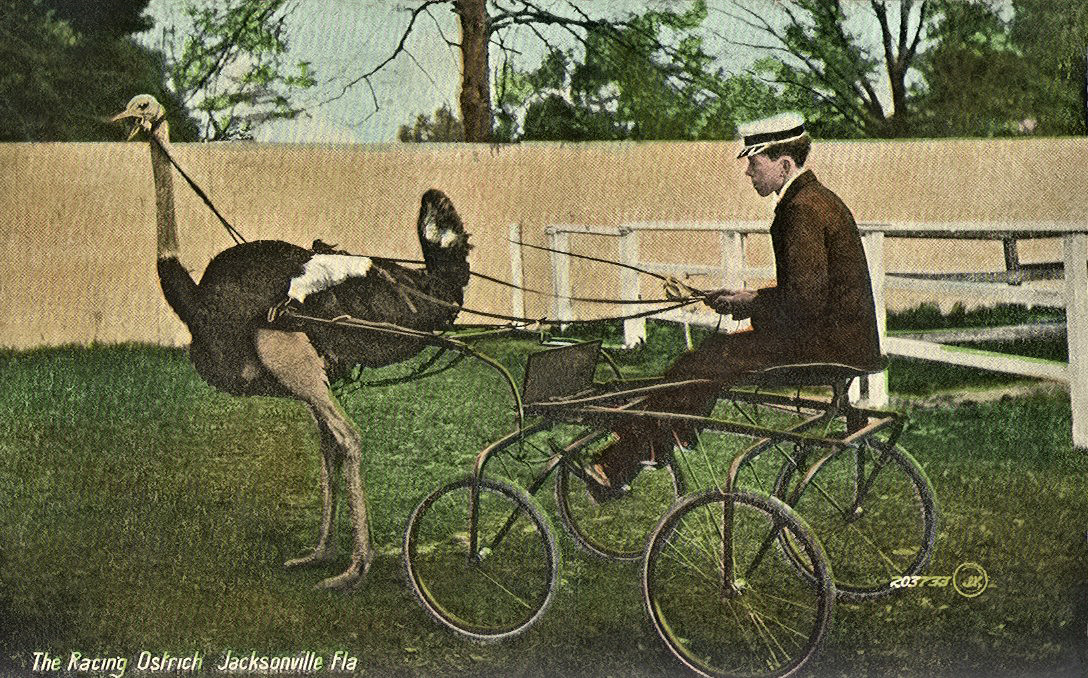
Ostrich racing

Animal racing:

- Bull racing (or Buffalo racing)
  - Buffalo racing in Kerala
  - Bull racing in Madura
- Camel racing
- Greyhound racing
- Horse racing, see also United Kingdom horse-racing and Equestrianism
  - Chariot racing
  - Flat racing
  - Thoroughbred horse races, such as Triple Crown of Thoroughbred Racing or a Derby.
  - Trotting
  - Steeplechase
- Kambala
- Karapan sapi
- Lobster Racing
- Ostrich racing
- Pigeon racing
- Pig racing
- Sled dog racing, such as the Iditarod Trail Sled Dog Race
  - Skijoring
- Snail racing
- Turtle Racing
- Zebra Racing

== Motorized vehicles ==
=== Air racing ===
- Drone racing

=== Terrestrial Vehicles ===
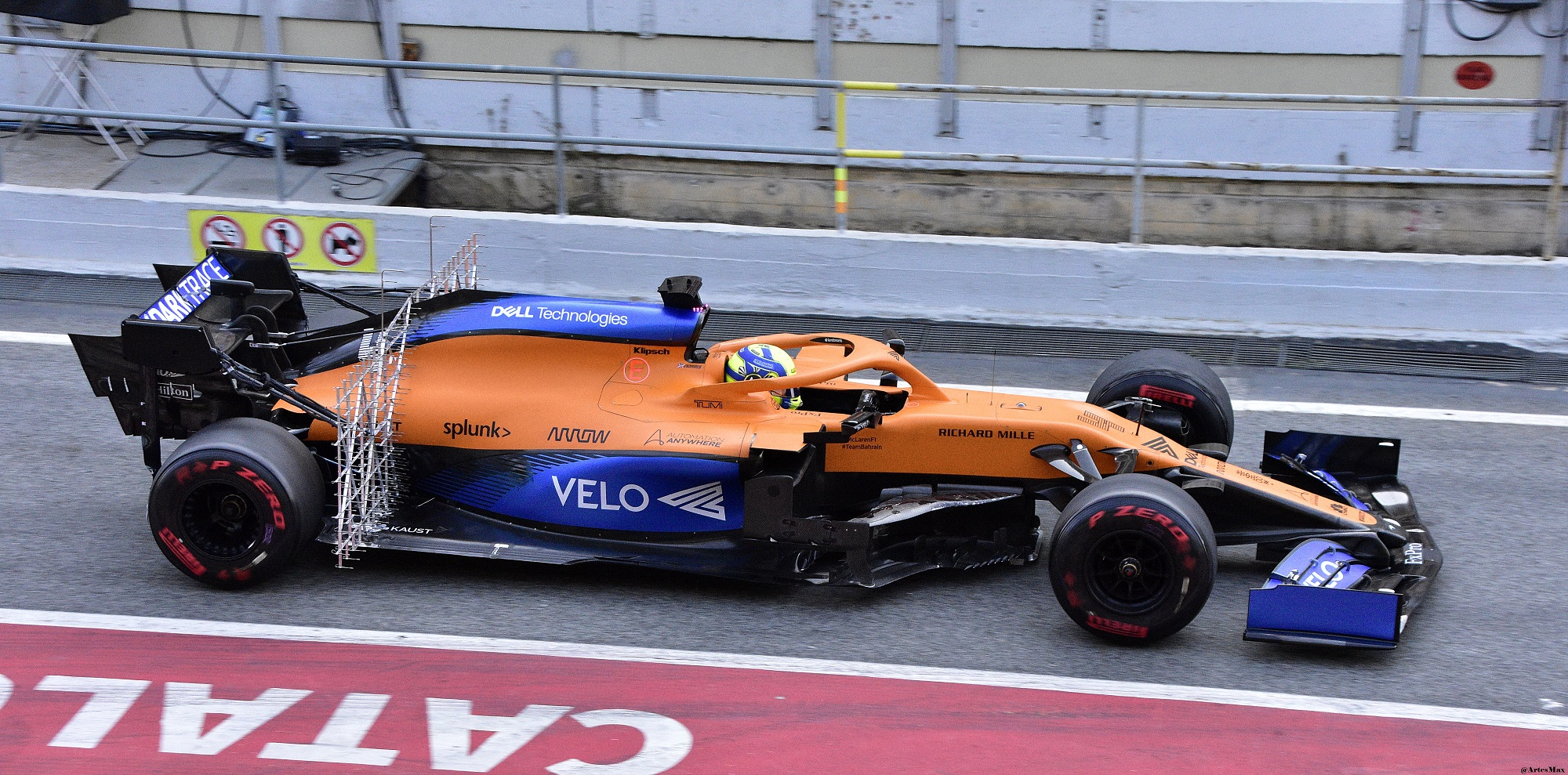
A 2020 Formula One car in pre-season testing.

- All-terrain vehicle
- Auto racing (also known as automobile racing or autosport)
  - Board track racing
  - Drag racing
  - Dirt track racing
  - Ice racing
  - Open wheel racing
    - Formula racing
    - Midget car racing
    - Sprint car racing
  - Offroad racing
  - Pickup truck racing
  - Production car racing
  - Rally racing
  - Rallycross
  - Road racing
  - Sports car racing
  - Stock car racing
  - Touring car racing
  - Truck racing
- Kart racing
- Lawnmower racing
- Motorcycle racing
  - Grand Prix motorcycle racing
  - Pocketbike racing
  - Production Bike Racing
  - Superbike racing
  - Track racing
    - Flat Track
    - Speedway
    - Grasstrack (a.k.a. Long Track)
  - Motocross
    - Supercross
    - Beachcross
  - Supermoto (a.k.a. Supermotard)
- Snowmobile racing
- Model racing
  - Radio-controlled model racing
  - Slot car racing

=== Watercraft ===
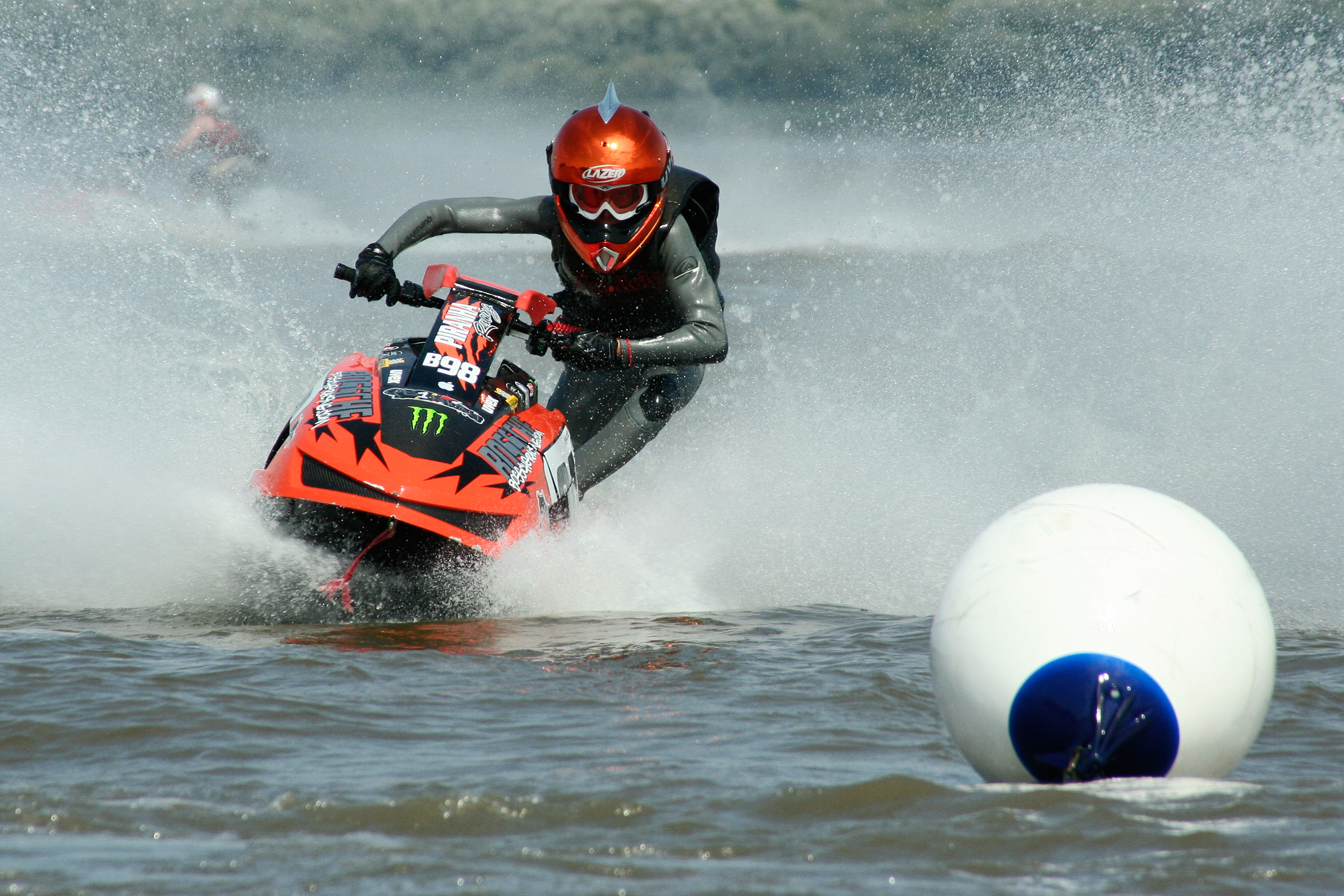
Personal water craft. Racing scene

- Drag boat racing
- Hydroplane racing
- Jet sprint boat racing
- Offshore powerboat racing

== Boat racing ==
- Canoe racing
  - Canoe orienteering
- Dragon boat racing
- Outrigger Canoe racing
- Rowing
- Sailing
- Yacht racing

== Skating ==
- Inline speed skating
- Speed skating
  - Ice cross downhill

== Other types ==
Some races involve multiple modes of transport:

- Adventure racing
- Kinetic sculpture racing
- Surf lifesaving

Other races may involve board or video games:

- Race game
- Racing video game
  - Speedrun
