= OUSA =

OUSA may mean:

- The Ontario Undergraduate Student Alliance
- The Open University Students Association, the students' union of the Open University
- The Organization of African Trade Union Unity (Organisation de l'Unité Syndicale Africaine)
- Orienteering USA, the national sports governing body for orienteering in the United States
- OrigamiUSA The largest Origami society in the USA
- The Otago University Students' Association
