= Canoe orienteering =

Type of orienteering sport

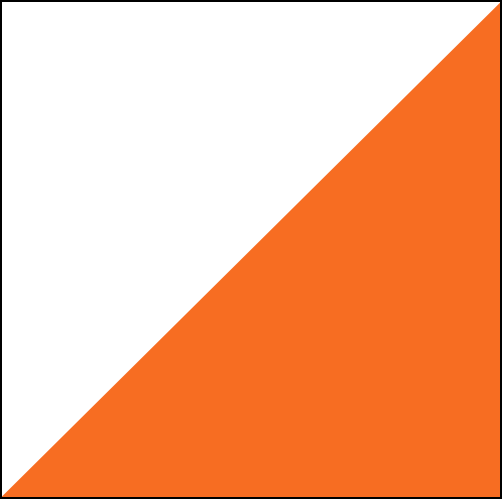
- The international orienteering symbol

Characteristics
- Contact: Non-contact
- Team members: Boat
- Type: Outdoor

Canoe orienteering (canoe-O) is an orienteering sport using a canoe, kayak, or other small boat. Usually, a canoe-O is a timed race in which one- or two-person boats start at staggered intervals, are timed, and are expected to perform all navigation on their own. Portages are allowed. The control points, shown on an orienteering map, may be visited in any order. Standings are determined first by successful completion of the course, then by shortest time on course.

Canoe-O is best done in a body of water with many small islands and a complex shoreline. Frequently, two-person teams compete using one canoe. Some control points are accessible by water and others by land. Route choice is important: competitors must select both water and land routes so that the controls are encountered efficiently, and neither team member wastes time waiting for the other.

Canoe-O has no international sports governing body. The United States Canoe Association has held an annual canoe and kayak orienteering championship since 1996 and has offered canoe-O during its national championships since 1992.

== Technical details ==
With respect to canoe-o race categories, C and K indicate canoe and kayak, respectively, and 1 and 2 are the number of seats (and hence paddlers). If a course requires or favors travel on land, canoes have an advantage over kayaks. Teams are permitted to split up, with one person going on land while the other controls the boat, thus both team members wear a compass and have a map. Map boards at each seat are popular.

== Notable people ==
Seven-time United States canoe orienteering national champion Aims Coney is also a ski orienteer affiliated with Cambridge Sports Union.

== Notable venues ==
Notable canoe-O venues include:

- Pawtuckaway Lake in New Hampshire, United States
- Peschanka reed bed in Dnipropetrovsk Oblast, Ukraine
