= NEOC =

NEOC may refer to:

- National Emergency Operations Centre, a government organisation of Switzerland
- New England Orienteering Club, an orienteering club in the United States
- 2-deoxy-scyllo-inosose synthase, an enzyme
