= Transmitter hunting =

Game of finding radio signal sources

Transmitter hunting (also known as T-hunting, fox hunting, bunny hunting, and bunny chasing), is an activity wherein participants use radio direction finding techniques to locate one or more radio transmitters hidden within a designated search area. This activity is most popular among amateur radio enthusiasts, and one organized sport variation is known as amateur radio direction finding.

== Types of transmitter hunts ==
Transmitter hunting is pursued in several different popular formats. Many transmitter hunts are organized by local radio clubs, and may be conducted in conjunction with other events, such as a radio enthusiast convention or club meeting. Before each hunt, participants are informed of the frequency or frequencies on which the transmitters will be operating, and a set of boundaries that define a search area in which the transmitters will be located. Transmitter hunters use radio direction finding techniques to determine the likely direction and distance to the hidden transmitter from several different locations, and then triangulate the probable location of the transmitter. Some hunts may include limits on the amount of time allowed to find a transmitter. Although many transmitter hunts are conducted just for the fun of the activity, some more competitive hunts will recognize winners in publications and offer awards, such as medals or trophies.

=== Mobile transmitter hunts ===
Mobile transmitter hunts are organized events where participants travel exclusively or primarily in motor vehicles. Most mobile transmitter hunts use VHF transmitters and receivers. Some participants use radio direction finding equipment and antennas mounted on a vehicle, whereas others use antennas that are temporarily deployed in an open window or an opening in the vehicle roof that can be easily rotated by hand while the vehicle is in motion. Other participants employ handheld antennas and radios that can only be used when the vehicle is stationary. Some mobile transmitter hunts require participants to leave their vehicles and proceed on foot to reach the actual location of the radio transmitter. The winner of a mobile transmitter hunt can be either the first vehicle to arrive at the hidden transmitter, or the vehicle that travels the shortest overall distance to locate the hidden transmitter. Mobile transmitter hunts are more popular in North America than other parts of the world.

=== Pedestrian transmitter hunts ===
A regulated sport form of transmitter hunting by runners on foot is called Amateur Radio Direction Finding, known worldwide by its acronym, ARDF. It is an amateur sport that combines the skills of orienteering and radio direction finding. ARDF is a timed race in which individual competitors use a topographic map and a magnetic compass to navigate through diverse, wooded terrain while searching for hidden radio transmitters. ARDF is the most popular form of transmitter hunting outside North America.

=== Fixed location transmitter hunts ===
Some transmitter hunts feature a "mail-in" competition, in which teams in fixed locations work together to locate hidden transmitters, then secretly give the coordinates to the organizers without actually traveling to the transmitter location. The team which provides the closest coordinates wins, thus a team which believes that the transmitter is in the northwest parking lot at 2nd and Elm (if it actually is there) will beat a team which says that the location is 2nd and Elm. This type of hunt enables participation by contestants who are unable to travel, such as people with mobility issues, minors, school groups, etc., and requires a greater level of skill and coordination.

== Equipment ==
Directional antennas are popular choices for transmitter hunting. A directional antenna is more sensitive to received signals in some directions than others. When a directional antenna is rotated, a received signal will either increase or decrease in signal strength, information from which a skilled hunter can determine the likely direction to the transmitter. The most popular designs for mobile transmitter hunts are quad antennas with three to five elements. Special design considerations include adequate strength to withstand the wind at highway vehicle speeds and ease of repair after collisions with overhead tree branches. In mobile transmitter hunts, directional antennas are often turned by hand while the vehicle is in motion.

Some radio direction finding equipment popular with mobile transmitter hunters operates on the time difference of arrival principal. Two identical antennas are mounted a precise distance apart from one another. Specialty electronics compare the phase of the signal received on each antenna and determine whether the signal is coming from a direction closer to one antenna or the other. This information is commonly displayed with LEDs on a display. These devices are popular for mobile transmitter hunts where participants have to exit their vehicles and proceed to the transmitter location on foot.

Some mobile transmitter hunters use equipment based on exploiting the principle of Doppler shift. At least four antennas are mounted in a precise geometric pattern, often on the roof of a vehicle. Specialty electronics computes the amount of Doppler shift present in the received signals and determines a probable direction from which the signal originates. The direction is commonly displayed using LEDs oriented in a circle or a straight line. Advanced units can use a compass or GPS receiver to compute a direction relative to the instant motion of the vehicle.

Attenuators are used by transmitter hunters to reduce the received signal strength of a transmitter. Attenuators are most often used when approaching the near vicinity of a transmitter, in order to keep the received signal strength within a usable range.

== See also ==
- Detection
- Radio direction finding
- Geocaching
