= Empire Orienteering Club =

Empire Orienteering Club (EMPO) was founded in 1987 to promote the sport of orienteering and develop suitable maps in the Capital District of New York State. The club was founded by Ed Downey, Ed Jaeger, Eric Hamilton and William Jameson during a meeting at the Guilderland, NY public library in the Spring of 1987. Today, EMPO organizes approximately 15 events per year, and has produced nearly 25 specialized, five color orienteering maps in the Albany, NY area. EMPO is a member of Orienteering USA.

== Orienteering Maps in the Capital District ==
- Blueberry Hill, Washington Ave. Extension, Albany, NY - No longer in use
- Camp Pinnacle, New Scotland, NY
- Camp Wakpominee, Fort Ann, NY
- Central Park, Schenectady, NY
- Charleston State Forest, Montgomery County, NY
- Clifton Park Common, Clifton Park, NY
- Cole Hill and Switzkill Farm, Berne, NY
- Colonie Mohawk River Park, Colonie, NY
- Crandall Park & Cole's Woods, Glens Falls, NY
- Dewey Mountain, Saranac Lake, NY
- Dutch Settlement State Forest, Schoharie County, NY
- Dwaas Kill Nature Preserve & Kinns Road, Clifton Park, NY
- Elm Avenue Park, Delmar, NY
- Five Rivers Environmental Education Center, Delmar, NY
- Foxenkill Flats (Berne-Knox-Westerlo School), Berne, NY
- Garnet Hill, North River, NY
- Garnsey Park, Clifton Park, NY
- Grafton Lakes State Park, Grafton, NY
- Hayes Nature Park, Clifton Park, NY
- Kenrose Preserve, Berne, NY
- Kinns Road County Forest, Clifton Park, NY
- Landis Arboretum, Esperance (town), New York
- Lapland Lake Resort, Benson, NY
- Little Notch (former Girl Scout Camp)t, Washington County, NY
- Margaret Burke WMA, Knox, New York
- Moreau Lake State Park, Moreau, NY
- Mt. Van Hoevenberg, Lake Placid, New York
- Niskayuna Parks, Niskayuna, New York
- Parker School, North Greenbush, NY
- Partridge Run State Wildlife Management Area, Berne, NY
- Paul Smith's - The VIC, Paul Smiths, New York
- Peebles Island State Park, Waterford, NY
- Pineridge Cross County Ski Center, Poestenkill, NY
- Pittstown State Forest, Pittstown, NY
- Pleasant Valley Farms, Berne, NY
- Rensselaerville State Forest, Rensselaerville, NY
- Rotary Boy Scout Camp, Poestenkill, NY
- Saratoga Biathlon & Competition Center, Day, NY
- Saratoga Spa State Park, Saratoga Springs, NY
- Schenectady Museum Nature Preserve, Niskayuna, NY - Now expanded and renamed Niskayuna Parks
- South Moe Road, Clifton Park, NY
- Tawasentha Park-Camp Pinnacle, Guilderland, NY
- (John Boyd) Thacher State Park, New Scotland, NY
- Vischer Ferry Nature and Historic Preserve, Clifton Park, NY
- Washington Park, Albany, NY
- Wilton Wildlife Preserve, Wilton, New York

== Empire OC's Major Events ==
Empire has run the following major US events.

- 1992 US Intercollegiate Championships - Grafton Lakes State Park, Grafton, NY
- 1993 US Relay Championships, Thacher State Park, New Scotland, NY
- 1997 US Ski-O Championships, Garnet Hill, North River, NY
- 1998 Billygoat Run XX, Mt. Norwottuck/The Notch, Hadley, MA
- 2000 US Ski-O Championships, Day, NY
- 2006 US Short-O and US Long-O Championships, Thacher State Park and Camp Pinnacle, New Scotland, NY
- 2007 Billygoat Run XXIX, Thacher State Park and Camp Pinnacle, New Scotland, NY
- 2010 US Individual Championships, Moreau Lake State Park, Moreau, NY
- 2012 Billygoat Run XXXIV, Moreau Lake State Park, Moreau, NY
- 2013 US Team Trials and US Sprint/Middle/Long Championships, Camp Wakpominee, Fort Ann, NY / Moreau Lake State Park, Moreau, NY
- 2015 US 'A' Meet at Pineridge Cross Country Ski Center, East Poestenkill, NY
- 2022 US National Ranking Event (NRE) at Rotary Scout Camp, Poestenkill, NY
- 2023 Orienteering USA Ski Orienteering Nationals, Lake Placid, NY

== 2014 Perm Cup ==
The Empire Club won the Perm Cup at the 2014 US Ski-Orienteering Championships, held at the Von Trapp Lodge in Stowe, VT, defeating 14 other US club teams.

== 2014 US Championships ==
The Empire Club won first place in the medium-sized club division at the 2014 US Orienteering Championships, held at Letchworth State Park in New York.
