= Orienteering USA =

Governing body for orienteering in the United States

- Sport: Orienteering
- Jurisdiction: United States
- Founded: 1971
- Affiliation: International Orienteering Federation
- Regional affiliation: North America
- Headquarters: Arlington, Virginia, U.S.
- President: Clare Durand

Official website
- orienteeringusa.org
- (United States)

Orienteering USA (OUSA), formerly United States Orienteering Federation (USOF), is the national governing body for orienteering in the United States. It is recognized by the International Orienteering Federation and the United States Olympic Committee. It was founded on 1 August 1971. Orienteering USA is a 501(c)(3) non-profit organization. There are 68 current member clubs and over 1,500 members.

== History ==
The first known competitive orienteering events in the U.S. were held from 1941 to 1943 in New Hampshire by a Finnish army officer named Piltti Heiskanen. There were military orienteering events for cadets only at West Point Military Academy in New York state from 1966 to 1972, and at Quantico Marine Base in Virginia by 1968, where the Marine Corps Physical Fitness Academy's first event was held on July 12, 1968, on Harald Wibye's photogrammetric color orienteering map, the first such map in the English-speaking world. This was also the origin of the Quantico Orienteering Club, currently the largest and most active club in the US. The Norwegian Wibye also hosted the first known public competitive orienteering event in the U.S. at Valley Forge in Pennsylvania on Nov. 5, 1967. From this event would emerge another large club in the U.S., the Delaware Valley Orienteering Association.

The most influential early benefactor to and promoter of U.S. map and compass use and orienteering, and easily the most well-read author on these topics, was Bjorn Kjellstrom, a 1930s Swedish orienteering champion. From his events with scouts as early as 1946 to his guidance and support in the 1990s, he provided impetus and inspiration. His map and compass events from 1965 to 1967 in Westchester County, NY had competitive orienteering courses added in 1968 by Wibye. Bill Gookin's first events in 1969 in the San Diego area were the earliest known competitive public orienteering events west of the Mississippi. Kjellstrom assisted several Quantico officers is establishing the U.S. Orienteering Federation in 1971. The early 1970s would see the founding, in part, by orienteering book author Hans Bengstsson, of the New England Orienteering Club, the largest in the U.S. from the late 1970s through the 1980s.

== Organization ==
Orienteering USA is predominantly a volunteer-run organization. It has a board of directors, officers and numerous committees and task forces.

OUSA states that its mission is to:

1. Increase participation in the sport.
2. Teach map reading and navigation skills.
3. Promote enjoyment of, and respect for, the environment.
4. Establish world-class competitive excellence within our national team programs.

== Affiliated clubs ==
Club name	Locale	State(s)
Arctic Orienteering Club	Anchorage	Alaska
ARK-LA-TEX Orienteering Club	Ark-La-Tex	Arkansas
ARK-LA-TEX Orienteering Club	Ark-La-Tex	Louisiana
ARK-LA-TEX Orienteering Club	Ark-La-Tex	Texas
Austin Orienteering Club	Austin	Texas
Backwoods Orienteering Klub	Raleigh–Durham–Cary	North Carolina
Badger Orienteering Club	Madison	Wisconsin
Bay Area Orienteering Club	San Francisco Bay Area	California
Bluegrass Orienteering Club	Lexington	Kentucky
Buffalo Orienteering Club	Buffalo	(New York (state)) New York
Cambridge Sports Union	Greater Boston	Massachusetts
Capital Region Nordic Alliance	Capital District	(New York (state)) New York
Carolina Orienteering Klub	Charlotte	North Carolina
Cascade Orienteering Club	Seattle	(Washington (state)) Washington
Central Ohio Orienteering	Columbus	Ohio
Central New York Orienteering	Syracuse	(New York (state)) New York
Central Virginia Orienteering Club	Richmond	Virginia
Chicago Area Orienteering Club	Chicago Metropolitan Area	Illinois
City of Trees Orienteering Club	Boise	Idaho
Columbia River Orienteering Club	Portland	Oregon
Delaware Valley Orienteering Association	Philadelphia metropolitan area	Delaware
Delaware Valley Orienteering Association	Philadelphia metropolitan area	Maryland
Delaware Valley Orienteering Association	Philadelphia metropolitan area	New Jersey
Delaware Valley Orienteering Association	Philadelphia metropolitan area	Pennsylvania
Eastern Washington Orienteering Club	Spokane	(Washington (state)) Washington
Empire Orienteering Club	Capital District	(New York (state)) New York
Florida Orienteering Club	Orlando	Florida
Greater Phoenix Orienteering Club	Phoenix Metropolitan Area	Arizona
Gold Country Orienteers	Sacramento	California
Green Mountain Orienteering Club	Burlington	Vermont
Grizzly Orienteering	Missoula	Montana
Houston Orienteering Club	Houston	Texas
Hudson Valley Orienteering Club	Hudson Valley	New Jersey
Hudson Valley Orienteering Club	Hudson Valley	(New York (state)) New York
Illinois River Valley Orienteering Club	Peoria	Illinois
Indiana Crossroads Orienteering	Indiana	Indiana
Long Island Orienteering Club	Long Island	(New York (state)) New York
Los Angeles Orienteering Club	Los Angeles	California
Miami Valley Orienteering Club	Dayton	Ohio
Minnesota Orienteering Club	Minnesota	Minnesota
Nashville Orienteering	Nashville	Tennessee
Nav-X-Sports	Santa Rosa	California
New England Orienteering Club	New England	Connecticut
New England Orienteering Club	New England	Massachusetts
New England Orienteering Club	New England	Rhode Island
North Country Orienteering	North Country	(New York (state)) New York
North Eastern Ohio Orienteering Club	Cleveland	Ohio
North Texas Orienteering Association	Dallas	Texas
Orienteering Club of Cincinnati	Cincinnati	Ohio
Orienteer Kansas	Lawrence	Kansas
Orienteering Louisville	Louisville	Kentucky
Orienteering Utah	Utah	Utah
Possum Trot Orienteering Club	Kansas City Metropolitan Area	Kansas
Possum Trot Orienteering Club	Kansas City Metropolitan Area	Missouri
Quantico Orienteering Club	Washington Metropolitan Area	(Washington, D.C.) District of Columbia
Quantico Orienteering Club	Washington Metropolitan Area	Maryland
Quantico Orienteering Club	Washington Metropolitan Area	Virginia
Rochester Orienteering Club	Rochester	(New York (state)) New York
Rocky Mountain Orienteering Club	Denver	Colorado
San Diego Orienteering Club	San Diego	California
Southern Michigan Orienteering Club	Southern Michigan	Michigan
St. Louis Orienteering Club	Greater St. Louis	Illinois
St. Louis Orienteering Club	Greater St. Louis	Missouri
Suncoast Orienteering and Adventure Racing	Sarasota Metropolitan Area	Florida
Susquehanna Valley Orienteering	York	Pennsylvania
Truckee Orienteering Club	Truckee	California
Tucson Orienteering Club	Tucson	Arizona
Up North Orienteers	New Hampshire	New Hampshire
Vulcan Orienteering Club	Birmingham	Alabama
Western Connecticut Orienteering Club	Western Connecticut	Connecticut
Western Pennsylvania Orienteering Club	Pittsburgh	Pennsylvania
