= New England Orienteering Club =

Orienteering club in the United States

New England Orienteering Club (NEOC) was founded in Cambridge, Massachusetts in 1972 to promote the sport of orienteering and develop suitable maps. Today, NEOC has over 400 members, organizes approximately 40 events per year, and has produced nearly 40 specialized, five color orienteering maps in Massachusetts, Rhode Island and eastern Connecticut.
