= Fox oring =

Variation of the ARDF radiosport

Fox oring is a variation of the sport of amateur radio direction finding. Fox oring is a timed race in which individual competitors use a topographic map and a magnetic compass to navigate through diverse, wooded terrain while searching for radio transmitters. The term is derived from the use of the term fox hunting to describe recreational radio direction finding activity and an abbreviation of the word orienteering.

== Description ==
Like amateur radio direction finding, fox oring is a sport that combines the skills of orienteering and radio direction finding. Fox oring requires more orienteering skills than ARDF. In a fox oring course, the radio transmitters put out very little power, and can be received over only very short distances, often no more than 100 meters. The location of each transmitter will be indicated on the map with a circle. The transmitter does not need to be exactly at the circle's center or even located inside the circle, but one should be able to receive its transmissions everywhere within the area indicated by the circle. A competitor must use orienteering skills to navigate to the area of the circle on the map and then use radio direction finding skills to locate the very low power transmitter.

Fox oring has increased popularity and it's now an official part of the International Amateur Radio Union Region 1 championship.

There are computer games, including algorithms for programmable calculators.

== See also ==
- Radiosport
- Orienteering
- Amateur radio
- Fox Oring (logic game)
