= Car orienteering =

Motor racing sport

Car orienteering (Car-O) is a form of motorsport where a map is used to navigate along unfamiliar roads. The sport is most active in Nordic countries. The sport has evolved from rally into a sport with stronger focus on navigation.

== International League ==
The international league is named North European Zone Auto Navigation (NEZ).

== See also ==
- Orienteering
- Rally raid
