= Amateur radio direction finding =

Type of amateur racing sport

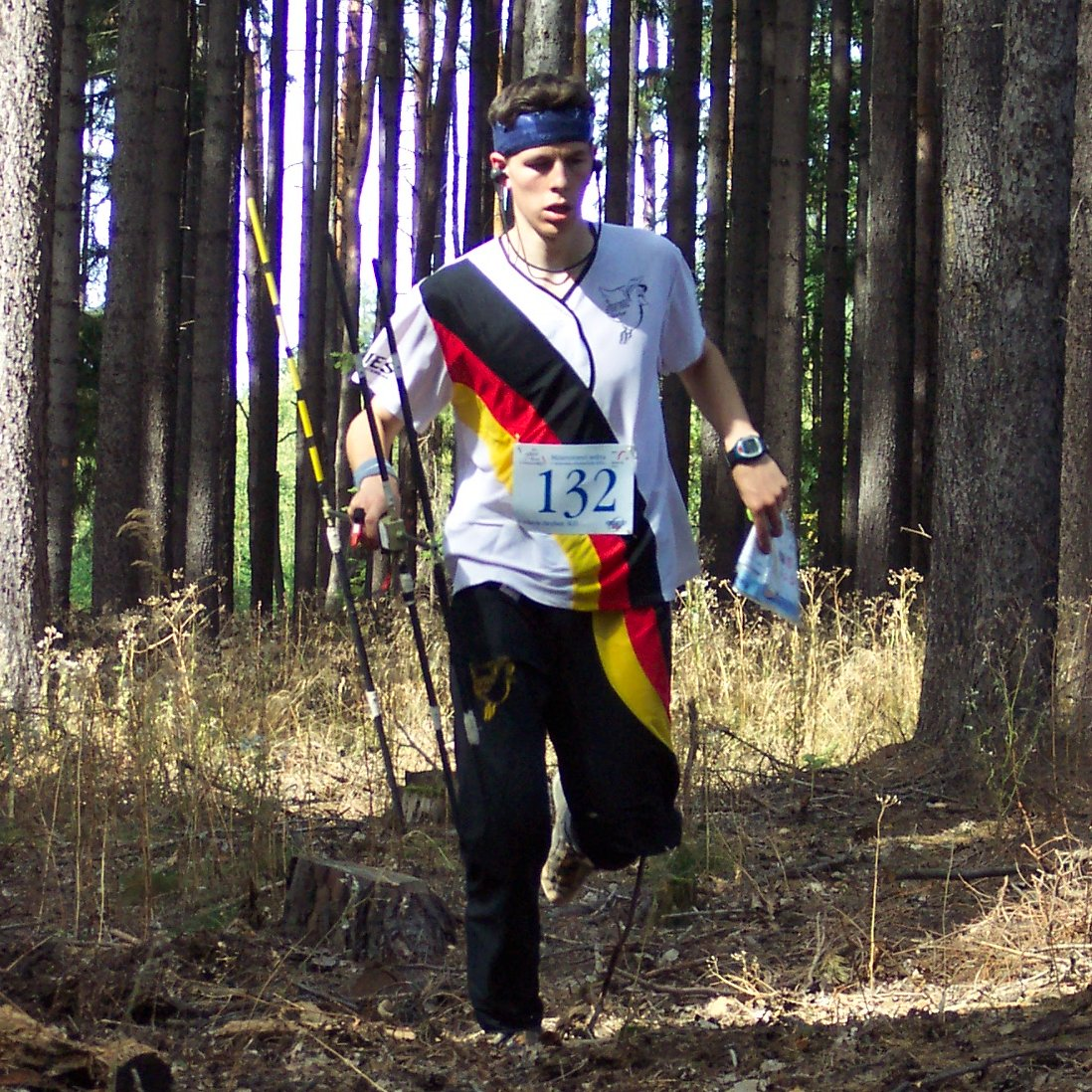
- A German competitor on a 2-meter band ARDF course
- Highest governing body: International Amateur Radio Union
- First played: 1950s, in northern and eastern Europe

Characteristics
- Contact: Non-contact
- Team members: Individual
- Mixed-sex: Separate categories
- Type: Outdoor

Amateur radio direction finding (ARDF, also known as radio orienteering, radio fox hunting and radiosport) is an amateur racing sport that combines radio direction finding with the map and compass skills of orienteering. It is a timed race in which individual competitors use a topographic map, a magnetic compass and radio direction finding apparatus to navigate through diverse wooded terrain while searching for radio transmitters. The rules of the sport and international competitions are organized by the International Amateur Radio Union. The sport has been most popular in Eastern Europe, Russia, and China, where it was often used in the physical education programs in schools.

ARDF events use radio frequencies on either the two-meter or eighty-meter amateur radio bands. These two bands were chosen because of their universal availability to amateur radio licensees in all countries. The radio equipment carried by competitors on a course must be capable of receiving the signal being transmitted by the five transmitters and useful for radio direction finding, including a radio receiver, attenuator, and directional antenna. Most equipment designs integrate all three components into one handheld device.

== History ==
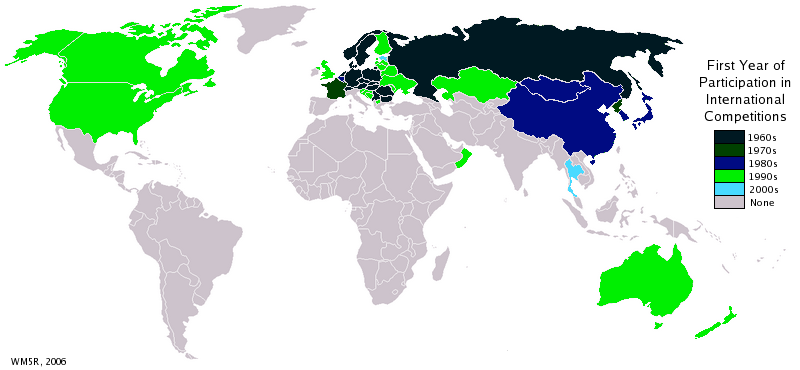
Nations that have participated in major international competitions since the first European Championship in 1961

One of the first ARDF events (called D.F. hunt), that was written about, is in The Wireless World and Radio Review, dated 21 July 1926. The event was held in Derbyshire, United Kingdom.

The sport originated in Northern and Eastern Europe in the late 1950s. Amateur radio was widely promoted in the schools of Northern and Eastern Europe as a modern scientific and technical activity. Most medium to large cities hosted one or more amateur radio clubs at which members could congregate and learn about the technology and operation of radio equipment. One of the activities that schools and radio clubs promoted was radio direction finding, an activity that had important civil defense applications during the Cold War. As few individuals in Europe had personal automobiles at the time, most of this radio direction finding activity took place on foot, in parks, natural areas, or on school campuses. The sport of orienteering, popular in its native Scandinavia, had begun to spread to more and more countries throughout Europe, including the nations of the Eastern Bloc. As orienteering became more popular and orienteering maps became more widely available, it was only natural to combine the two activities and hold radio direction finding events on orienteering maps.

Interest in this kind of on-foot radio direction finding activity using detailed topographic maps for navigation spread throughout Scandinavia, Eastern and Central Europe, the Soviet Union, and the People's Republic of China. Formal rules for the sport were first proposed in England and Denmark in the 1950s. The first European Championship in the sport was held in 1961 in Stockholm, Sweden. Four additional international championships were held in Europe in the 1960s, and three more were held in the 1970s. The first World Championship was held in 1980 in Cetniewo, Poland, where competitors from eleven European and Asian countries participated. World Championships have been generally held in even-numbered years since 1984, although there was no World Championship in 1996, and there was a World Championship in 1997. Asian nations began sending national teams to international events in 1980, and teams from nations in Oceania and North America began competing in the 1990s. Athletes from twenty-six nations attended the 2000 World Championship in Nanjing, China, the first to be held outside of Europe.

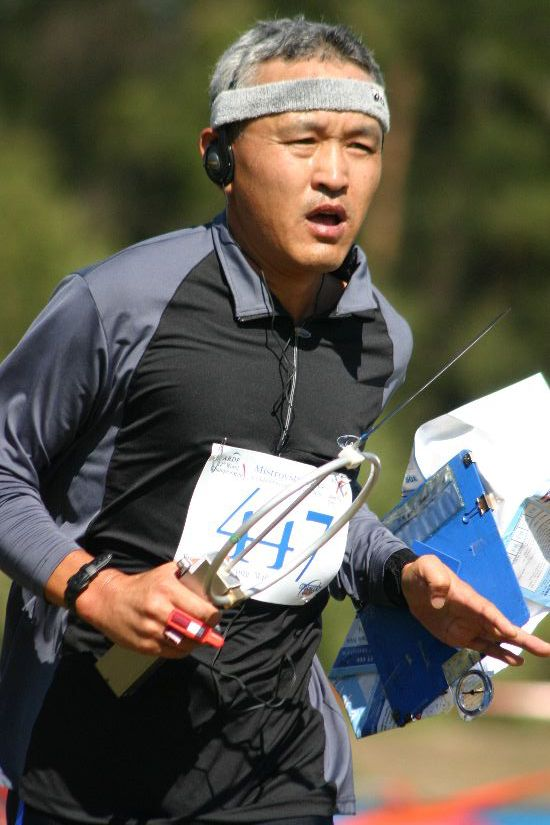
A member of the Republic of Korea national team sprints to the finish line of an eighty meter ARDF course.

As the sport grew in the 1960s and 1970s, each nation devised its own set of rules and regulations. The need for more clearly defined and consistent rules for international competitions led to the formation of an ARDF working group by the International Amateur Radio Union (IARU) in the late 1970s. The first ARDF event to use the new standardized rules was the 1980 World Championship. These rules have been revised and updated over the years, increasing the number of gender and age categories into which competitors are classified, as well as formalizing the start and finish line procedures. While some variations exist, these standardized rules have since been used worldwide for ARDF competitions, and the IARU has become the principal international organization promoting the sport. The IARU divides the world into three regions for administrative purposes. These regions correspond with the three regions used by the International Telecommunication Union for its regulatory purposes, but the IARU has also used these regions for sports administration. The first IARU Region I (Europe, Africa, the Middle East, and ex-USSR) Championship was held in 1993 in Chtelnica, Slovakia, the first IARU Region III (Asia and Oceania) Championship was held in 1993 in Beijing, China, and the first IARU Region II (North and South America) Championship was held in 1999 in Portland, Oregon, USA. In addition to participation in international events, most nations with active ARDF organizations hold annual national championships using the IARU rules.

ARDF is a sport that spans much of the globe. In 2012 over 570 athletes from thirty-three countries, representing four continents, entered the 16th World Championships held in Kopaonik, Serbia Organized ARDF competitions can be found in almost every European country and in all the nations of northern and eastern Asia. ARDF activity is also found in Thailand, Australia, New Zealand, Canada, and the United States. Although they represent a broad range of amateur radio interests in their nations today, several member societies of the International Amateur Radio Union were originally formed for the promotion and organization of the sport and continue to use the term radiosport in their society name. These include the Federation of Radiosport of the Republic of Armenia (FRRA), the Belarusian Federation of Radioamateurs and Radiosportsmen (BFRR), the Chinese Radio Sports Association (CRSA), and the Mongolian Radio Sport Federation (MRSF). To promote the sport, the IARU has delegated individuals as ARDF Coordinators for each IARU region to help educate and organize national radio societies and other ARDF groups, especially in nations without prior activity in the sport.

== Description of competition and rules ==
The rules used throughout the world, with minor variations, are maintained by the IARU Region I ARDF Working Group. Although these rules were developed specifically for international competitions, they have become the de facto standard used as the basis for all international competitions worldwide.

An ARDF competition normally takes place in diverse wooded terrain, such as in a public park or natural area but competitions have also been held in suitable suburban areas. Each competitor receives a detailed topographic map of the competition area. The map will indicate the location of the start with a triangle and the location of the finish with two concentric circles. Somewhere within the competition area designated on the map, the meet organizer will have placed five low power radio transmitters. The locations of the transmitters are kept a secret from the competitors and are not marked on the map. Each transmitter emits a signal in Morse code by which it is easily identifiable to the competitors. The transmitters automatically transmit one after another in a repeating cycle. Depending on entry classification, a competitor will attempt to locate as many as three, four, or all five of the transmitters in the woods, and then travel to the finish line in the shortest possible time. Competitors start at staggered intervals, are individually timed, and are expected to perform all radio direction finding and navigation skills on their own. Standings are determined first by the number of transmitters found, then by shortest time on course. Competitors who take longer than the specified time limit to finish may be disqualified.

ARDF events use radio frequencies on either the 2-meter or 80-meter amateur radio bands. These two bands were chosen because of their universal availability to amateur radio licensees in all countries. Each band requires different radio equipment for transmission and reception, and requires the use of different radio direction finding skills. Radio direction finding equipment for eighty meters, an HF band, is relatively easy to design and inexpensive to build. Bearings taken on eighty meters can be very accurate. Competitors on an eighty-meter course must use bearings to determine the locations of the transmitters and choose the fastest route through the terrain to visit them. Two meters, a VHF band, requires equipment that is relatively more complicated to design and more expensive to build. Radio signals on two meters are more affected by features of the terrain. Competitors on a two-meter course must learn to differentiate between accurate, direct bearings to the source of the radio signal and false bearings resulting from reflections of the signal off hillsides, ravines, buildings, or fences. Large national or international events will have one day of competition using a 2-meter frequency and one day of competition using an 80-meter frequency.

In addition to the rules of the sport, ARDF competitions must also comply with radio regulations. Because the transmitters operate on frequencies assigned to the Amateur Radio Service, a radio amateur with a license that is valid for the country in which the competition is taking place must be present and responsible for their operation. Individual competitors, however, are generally not required to have amateur radio licences, as the use of simple handheld radio receivers does not typically require a license. Regulatory prohibitions on the use of amateur radio frequencies for commercial use generally preclude the awarding of monetary prizes to competitors. Typical awards for ARDF events are medals, trophies, plaques, or certificates.

=== Entry categories ===
Although all competitors at an ARDF event use the same competition area and listen to the same set of five transmitters, they do not all compete in the same category. Current IARU rules divide entrants into different categories based on their age and gender. Only the M21 category must locate all five transmitters, while the other categories may skip only a specified transmitter or transmitters.

- M19—Men ages 19 and younger, 4 or 5 transmitters
- M21—Men of any age, 5 transmitters
- M40—Men ages 40 and older, 4 or 5 transmitters
- M50—Men ages 50 and older, 4 or 5 transmitters
- M60—Men ages 60 and older, 3 or 4 transmitters
- M70—Men ages 70 and older, 3 or 4 transmitters
- W19—Women ages 19 and younger, 4 or 5 transmitters
- W21—Women of any age, 4 or 5 transmitters
- W35—Women ages 35 and older, 4 or 5 transmitters
- W45—Women ages 45 and older, 3 or 4 transmitters
- W55—Women ages 55 and older, 3 or 4 transmitters
- W65—Women ages 65 and older, 3 or 4 transmitters

=== Youth competitions ===
The International Amateur Radio Union rules for ARDF competitions include provisions for youth competitions. These competitions are restricted to competitors aged sixteen years or younger. The course lengths are shorter (up to six kilometers), the transmitters may be located closer to the start (500 meters), and a course setter may require that fewer transmitters be located.

Since 2017, there is World Youth ARDF Championship (WYAC) every year. Participating categories in these championships are W14, W16, M14 and M16.

==== WYAC by year ====
- 2017 - Turčianske Teplice, Slovakia
- 2018 - Doksy, Czech Republic
- 2019 - Vinnytsia, Ukraine

=== Local variations ===
The IARU rules go into great detail about certain procedures that are unique to international championships events. Not every ARDF competition follows all of these rules. Common variations to the generally accepted rules exist at local events. Most smaller events do not have large juries or on-course referees. Some events will use simpler start procedures, such as using only one starting corridor instead of two. ARDF events on the two meter band in North America sometimes use frequency modulation instead of amplitude modulation for the transmission of the Morse code identifications.

== Map and course details ==
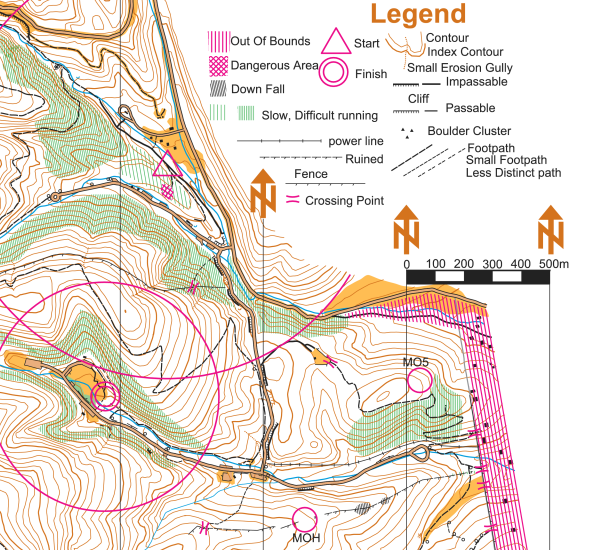
A portion of an orienteering map marked for an ARDF competition. Here, labeled circles indicate the locations of two of the five transmitters, but these do not appear on the maps given to competitors.

Ideally, the topographic maps used in ARDF competitions are created using the International Specification for Orienteering Maps 2000 (ISOM) set by the International Orienteering Federation and used for orienteering competitions. In fact, many ARDF competitions use existing orienteering maps, in collaboration with the orienteering clubs that created those maps.

Course design is an important element of a successful competition. The international rules adopted by the IARU include both requirements and recommendations for basic course design. Important requirements are that no transmitter may be within 750 meters of the start, no transmitter may be within 400 meters of the finish or any other transmitter on course, and that there is no more than 200 meters elevation change between the start, finish, and all transmitters. The IARU rules for international competitions recommend that courses be designed for six to ten kilometers of total travel distance through the terrain. A well-designed course will present the competitors with an athletic challenge in addition to the challenges of land navigation and radio direction finding. Depending on the course design and competition, winning times at World Championship events are often less than 90 minutes for two meter courses, and can be under 60 minutes for eighty meter courses.

== Equipment and clothing ==
ARDF equipment is a specialty market, and much of what is available for purchase comes from small commercial vendors or small-batch production by individuals. Building equipment, such as handheld antennas, from published designs or kits is also a popular activity. Clothing and other equipment is sold through specialty orienteering equipment suppliers or general outdoor sports retailers.

=== Transmitter equipment ===
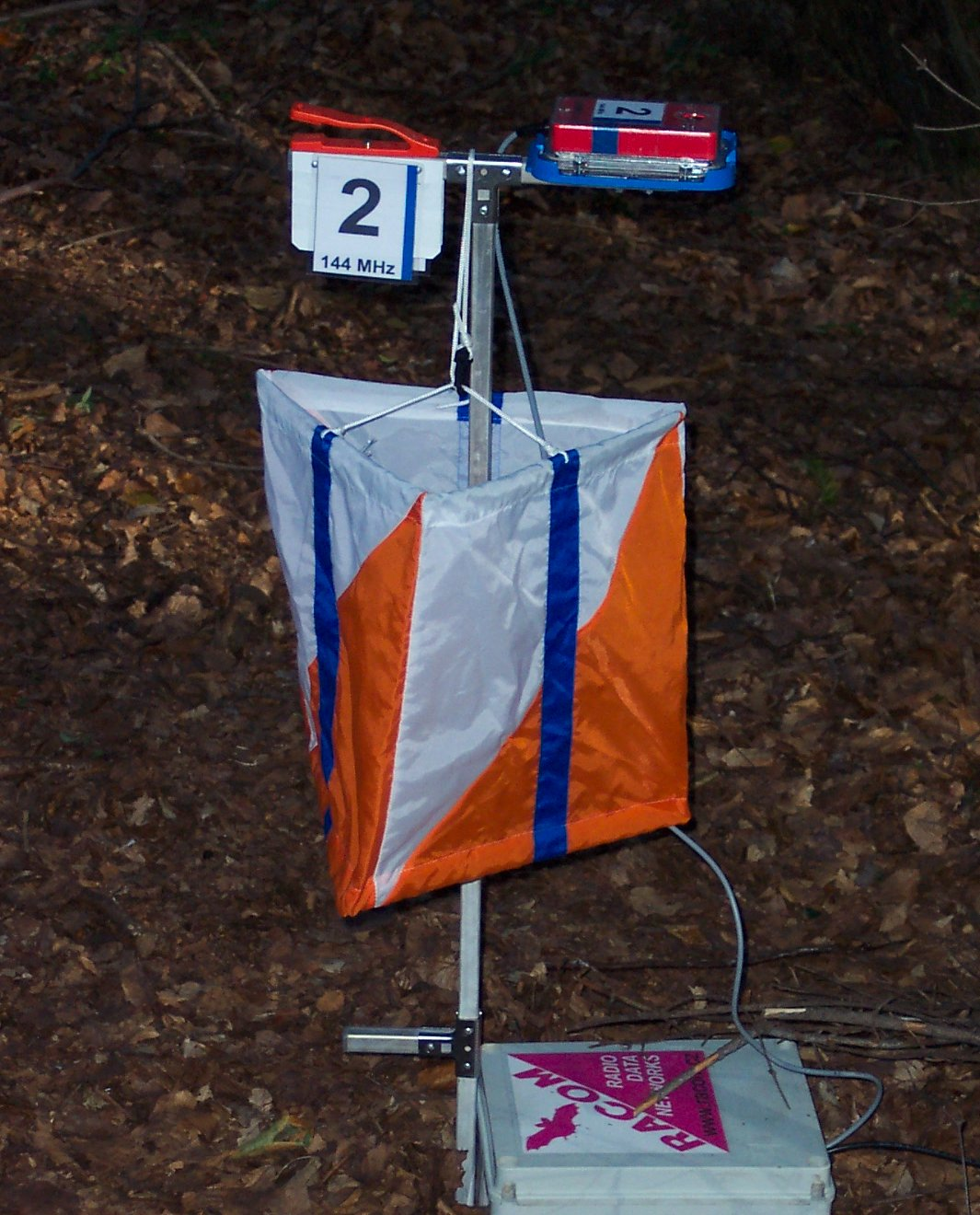
A transmitter, orienteering control flag, paper punch and electronic punch device at an ARDF control

ARDF transmitters have a low power output and operate in either the two meter or eighty meter amateur radio band. The transmissions are in Morse code. Each transmitter sends a unique identification that can be easily interpreted even by those unfamiliar with the Morse code by counting the number of dits that follow a series of dashes. The transmitters on course all transmit on the same frequency and each transmit in sequence for one minute at a time in a repeating cycle. Within a few meters of each transmitter, an orienteering control flag and punch device will be present. For many events and all major events, the punch device is an electronic system, such as SPORTident, used in orienteering competitions. This records the time competitors visit each control on a small device that they carry. An alternative is to use pin punches which the competitor uses to make a distinct pattern on a control card they carry. Competitors need to locate the control flag at the transmitter site and use the punch device to record their visit. Good course design will attempt to preclude, as much as possible, runners interfering with the transmitter equipment as they approach the control. At large international or national events, jurors might be present at transmitter controls to ensure fair play.

The IARU rules include detailed technical specifications for transmitter equipment. Transmitters for two meters are typically 0.25 to 1 watts power output, and use keyed amplitude modulation. The transmitter antennas used on two meters must be horizontally polarized and omnidirectional. Transmitters for eighty meters are typically one to five watts power output keyed CW modulation. The transmitter antennas used on eighty meters must be vertically polarized and omnidirectional. It is common for the transmitter, a battery, and any controlling hardware to be placed inside a weatherproof container such as an old ammunition case or large plastic food storage container for protection from the elements and wildlife.

=== Receiver equipment ===
The radio equipment carried on course must be capable of receiving the signal being transmitted by the five transmitters and useful for radio direction finding. This includes a radio receiver that can tune in the specific frequency of transmission being used for the event, an attenuator or variable gain control, and a directional antenna. Directional antennas are more sensitive to radio signals arriving from some directions than others. Most equipment designs integrate all three components into one handheld device. On the two meter band, the most common directional antennas used by competitors are two or three element Yagi antennas made from flexible steel tape. This kind of antenna has a cardioid receiving pattern, which means that it has one peak direction where the received signal will be the strongest, and a null direction, 180° from the peak, in which the received signal will be the weakest. Flexible steel tape enables the antenna elements to flex and not break when encountering vegetation in the forest. On the eighty meter band, two common receiver design approaches are to use either a small loop antenna or an even smaller loop antenna wound around a ferrite rod. These antennas have a bidirectional receiving pattern, with two peak directions 180° apart from one another and two null directions 180° apart from one another. The peak directions are 90° offset from the null directions. A small vertical antenna element can be combined with the loop or ferrite rod antenna to change the receiving pattern to a cardioid shape, but the resulting null in the cardioid is not as sensitive as the nulls in the bidirectional receiving pattern. A switch is often used to allow the competitor to select the bidirectional or cardioid patterns at any moment. ARDF receiver equipment is designed to be lightweight and easy to operate while the competitor is in motion as well as rugged enough to withstand use in areas of thick vegetation.

=== Clothing ===
The IARU rules specify that the choice of clothing is an individual decision of the competitor, unless the meet director specifies otherwise. Although comfortable outdoor clothing is all that is required for participation, specialty clothing developed for the sport of orienteering is also worn by ARDF competitors. Nylon pants, shirts, or suits, gaiters or padded socks for lower leg protection, and specialty shoes for cross-country running through wooded terrain are popular choices. Some competitors may choose to carry food or water on course, and wear a small waist pack or hydration pack for this purpose. At large international or national events, competitors may be required by the meet director to wear identifying numbers pinned to their clothing, and many wear team uniforms in their national colors.

=== Other equipment ===
In addition to the radio equipment and topographic map, an ARDF competitor uses a magnetic compass for navigation. The most popular compass types are those that are also popular for use in orienteering. Some events may require or suggest that competitors carry a whistle for emergency use. In at least one World Championship event, competitors were provided with cards written in the native language of the host country, intended to aid in communications with local citizens in the event that a competitor needed emergency aid or directions. In general, the use of cellular phone, or two-way radio equipment on course is prohibited. All competitors are encouraged to wear a watch to keep track of their time on course and not finish over the time limit set for the competition.

== Variations ==
Sprint events have shorter courses with an expected winning time of 15 minutes and use either a 1:5000 or 1:4000 map. They use lower powered transmitters on the eighty meter band which transmit in sequence for only 12 seconds with the cycle repeating every minute. The IARU Region 1 Rules require 2 sets of 5 transmitters where each set operates on a different frequency. The Morse code transmitted by the second set of transmitters is slightly faster (PARIS 70) than the first set (PARIS 50) to differentiate the two sets. There is also a "spectator" control and a "beacon" control which both operate on different frequencies to the other ten, so four frequencies are used in total. It is possible to combine the spectator control with the beacon control. Competitors start at 2 min intervals and have to visit between 3 and 5 controls out of the first set (according to their age class) before visiting the compulsory spectator control. They then visit the requisite controls from the second set before punching the compulsory beacon control, prior to finishing.

Fox oring is a variation of the sport that requires more orienteering skills. In a fox oring course, the radio transmitters put out very little power, and can be received over only very short distances, often no more than 100 meters. The location of each transmitter will be indicated on the map with a circle. The transmitter does not need to be exactly at the circle's center or even located inside the circle, but one should be able to receive its transmissions everywhere within the area indicated by the circle. A competitor must use orienteering skills to navigate to the area of the circle on the map and only then use radio direction finding skills to locate the very low power transmitter.

Another variation of the sport, radio orienteering in a compact area, requires less athletic skill and more technical radio direction finding skills. In a ROCA course, the transmitters put out very little power, typically 10 to 200 mW, and can be received over only very short distances. The transmitters are physically small, and marked with a control card that is no larger than a typical postcard with a unique number identification. Because of the low power and short distances involved, most ROCA competitors walk the entire course, and focus their attention on the radio direction finding tasks rather than navigation.

Another form of recreational radio direction finding activity in North America that includes the use of automobiles for transportation is most often referred to as foxhunting or transmitter hunting, but is sometimes confused with the organized international sport of amateur radio direction finding.

== See also ==
- Friendship Radiosport Games
- Radio direction finder
