= Radio orienteering in a compact area =

Variation of the ARDF radiosport

Radio orienteering in a compact area is a variation of amateur radio direction finding. ROCA is a timed race in which individual competitors use a topographic map and a magnetic compass to navigate through diverse, wooded terrain while searching for radio transmitters.

== Description ==
ROCA is a sport that requires less athletic skill and more technical radio direction finding skills than ARDF. In a ROCA course, the radio transmitters put out very little power, typically 10 to 200 mW, and can be received over only very short distances. Transmitters may identify themselves in Morse code or with voice recordings, and only transmit for ten seconds during every minute of the competition. The transmitters are physically small, and marked with a control card that is no larger than a typical postcard with a unique number identification. Decoy control cards may be placed in the competition area, as well, to force competitors to locate the actual transmitting devices. Because of the low power and short distances involved, most ROCA competitors walk the entire course, and focus their attention on the radio direction finding tasks rather than navigation.

ROCA is not as popular as ARDF, and activity is limited to only active clubs in a few countries. ROCA events can be found today primarily in the San Francisco Bay area of the United States and in the People's Republic of China.

== See also ==
- Radiosport
- Orienteering
- Amateur radio
