= Orienteering map =

Map used in orienteering

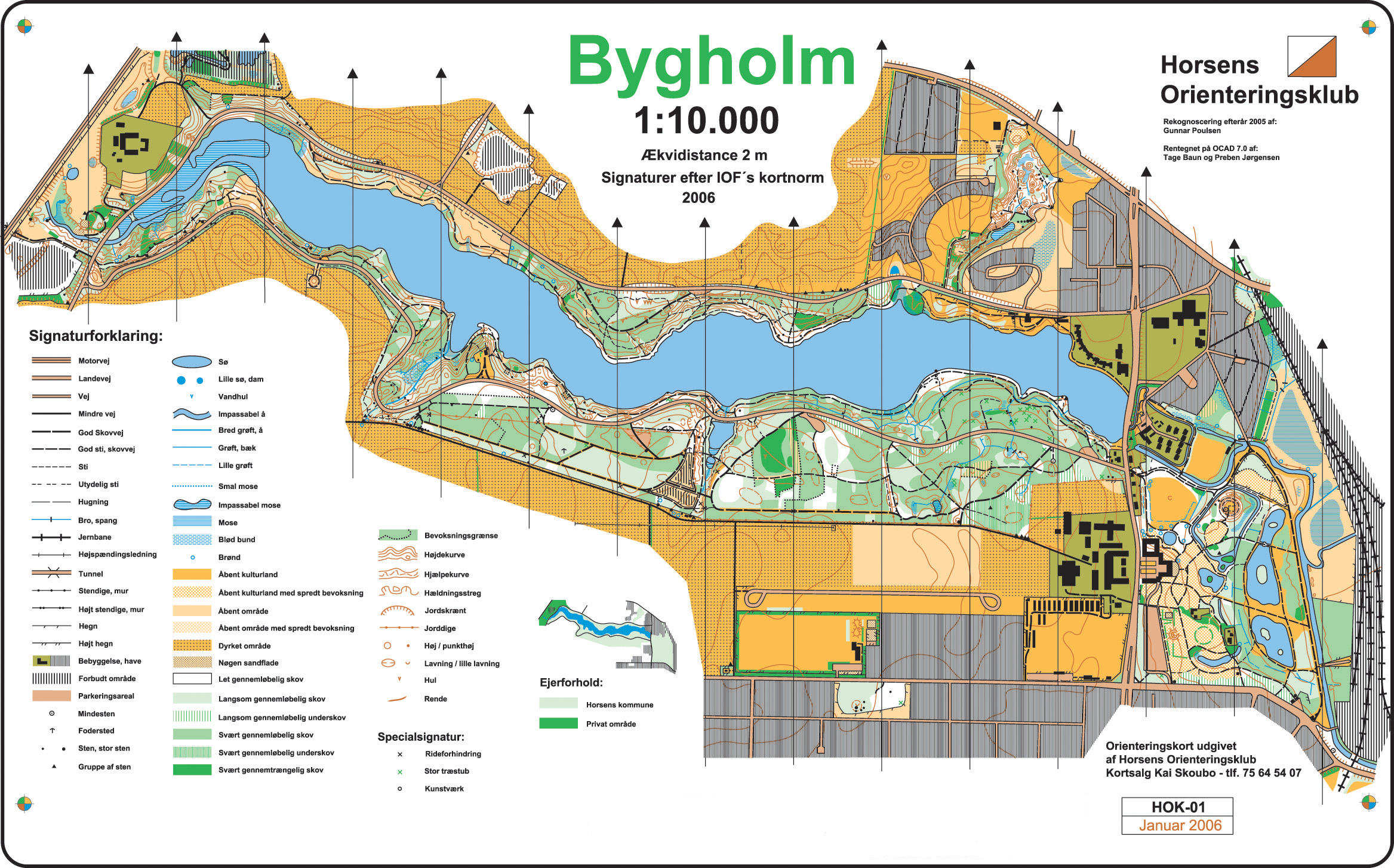
Orienteering map

An orienteering map is a map specially prepared for use in orienteering events. It is a large-scale topographic map with extra markings to help the participant navigate through the course.

These maps are much more detailed than general-purpose topographic maps, and incorporate a standard symbology designed to be useful to anyone, regardless of native language. In addition to indicating the topography of the terrain with contour lines, orienteering maps also show forest density, water features, clearings, trails and roads, earthen banks and rock walls, ditches, wells and pits, fences and power lines, buildings, boulders, and other features of the terrain.

Orienteering maps meant for competition in forested areas are usually 1:15 000 or 1:10 000 scale and 1:4.000 for sprint maps in cities, and parks.

The International Orienteering Federation (IOF) publishes the standard for orienteering maps, including:

- ISOM (International Specification for Orienteering Maps), used for FootO forest maps.
- ISSprOM (International Specification for Sprint Orienteering Maps), used for FootO sprint and TrailO maps.
- ISSkiOM (International Specification for Ski Orienteering Maps), used for SkiO maps.
- ISMTBOM (International Specification for Mountain Bike Orienteering Maps), used for MTBO maps.

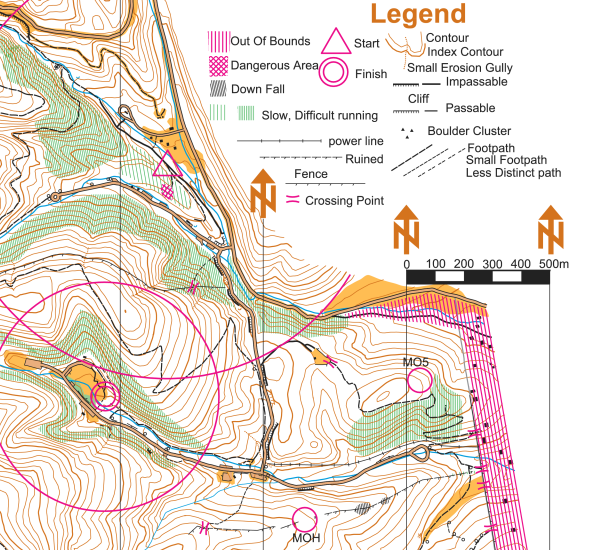
Orienteering map (not to IOF standard) marked for amateur radio direction finding, with a triangle at Start, large and small concentric circles at Finish, and two of five control points (hidden radio beacons). Beacon control points are shown for post-competition analysis; ARDF competitors must find the beacons.

== Purpose ==
An orienteering map, and a compass, are the primary aids for the competitor to complete an orienteering course of control points as quickly as possible. A map that is reliable and accurate is essential so that a course can be provided which will test the navigational skills of the competitor. The map also needs to be relevant to the needs of the competitor showing the terrain in neither too much nor too little detail.

Because the competition must test the navigational skills of the competitor, areas are sought which have a terrain that is rich in usable features. In addition, the area should be attractive and interesting. Notable examples in the US include Pawtuckaway State Park, New Hampshire and Valles Caldera, New Mexico, both having many boulders and boulder fields, and a wide variety of other terrain types.

Orienteering maps are produced by local orienteering clubs and are a valuable resource for the club. Orienteering maps are expensive to produce and the principal costs are: the fieldwork, drawing (cartography), and printing. Each of these can use up valuable resources of a club, be it in manpower or financial costs. Established clubs with good resources e.g. maps and manpower are usually able to host more events.

== History ==
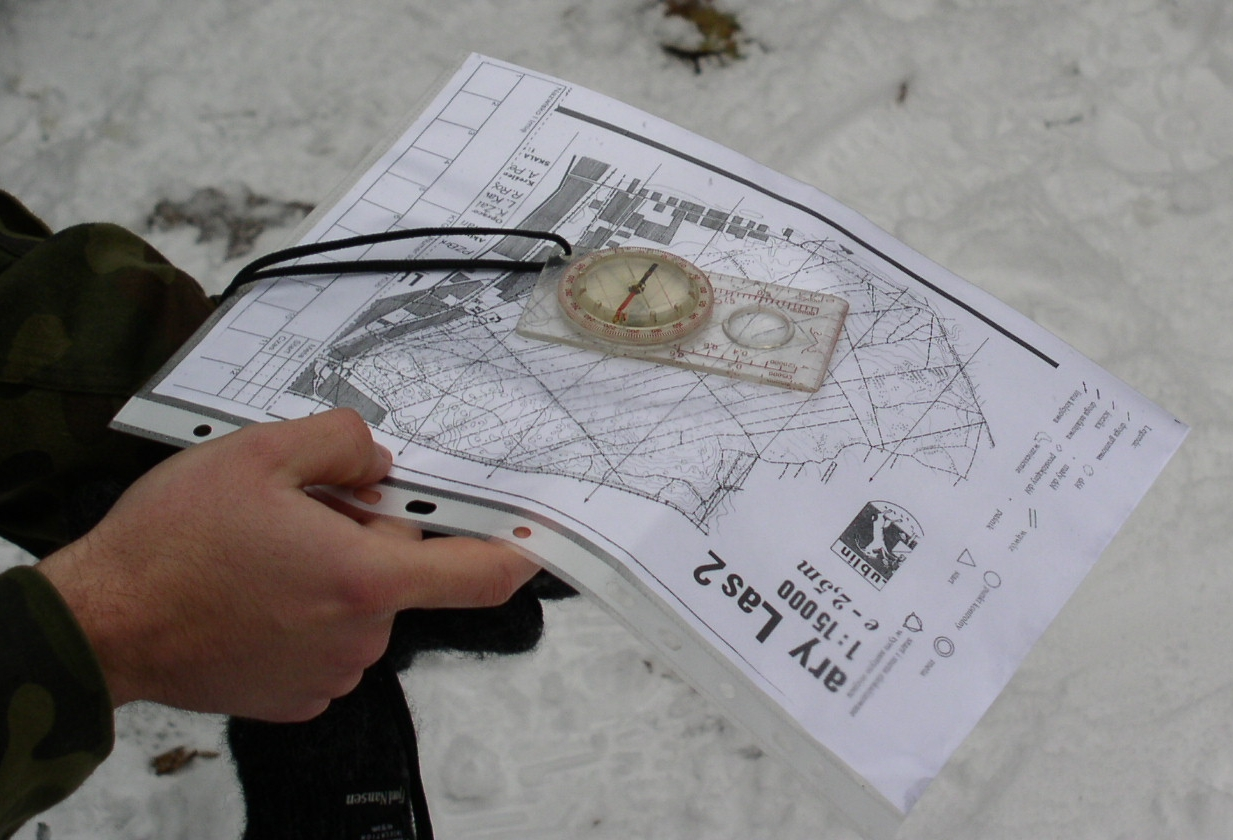
Orienteering map

In the early days of orienteering, competitors used whatever maps were available; these were typically topographic maps from the national mapping agency. While national mapping agencies update their topographic maps on a regular basis, they are usually not sufficiently up to date for orienteering purposes. Gradually, specially drawn maps have been provided to meet the specific requirements of orienteering.

Maps produced specifically for orienteering show a more detailed and up-to-date description of terrain features. For example, large rocks above the soil surface do not normally appear on topographic maps but can be important features on many orienteering maps. New features such as fence lines can be important navigational aids and may also affect route choice. Orienteering maps include these new features.

Cartographer Jan Martin Larsen was a pioneer in the development of the specialized orienteering map.

== Map content ==
The map scale depends on the purpose of the competition and also the standard used, for example, a map used in a foot orienteering long distance event has a scale of 1:15000. The map is printed in six base colours, which cover the main groups: Land forms, rock and boulders, water and marsh, vegetation, and man-made features, and an extra colour for overprinting symbols.

Example of different land forms

=== Brown: Land forms ===
Land forms are shown using contour lines. The contour interval is normally 5 metres, but other intervals such as 2 or 2.5 metres may be used in sprint maps. Additional symbols are provided to show, e.g. earth bank, knoll, depression, small depression, pit, broken ground, etc.

=== Black: Rock features ===
This group covers cliffs, boulders, boulder fields, and boulder clusters etc.

=== Blue: Water features ===
This group covers lakes, ponds, rivers, water channels, marshes, wells, and seasonal streams, etc.

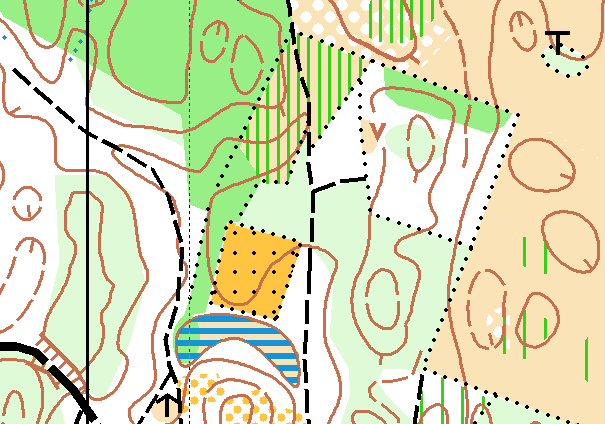
Vegetation: White colour is forest, yellow is open area, and green indicates reduced runnability.

=== Green/Yellow: Vegetation ===
This group covers vegetation. White is typically an open, runnable forest. Green means a forest of low visibility with reduced running speed, being graded from slow running, through difficult running, to impassable. Yellow shows open areas, usually referring to fields. Green vertical stripes are used to indicate undergrowth (slow or difficult running), but with good visibility otherwise.

=== Black: Man-made features ===
Man-made features include roads, tracks, paths, power lines, stone walls, fences, buildings, etc.

Fences/walls may have double or single dashes, indicating whether they are impassable or passable.

=== Technical symbols ===
Two technical symbols are required on all maps: Magnetic north lines printed in blue, and register crosses (these show that the printed colours are coincident).

=== Other map information ===
Other information is required to be on the printed map, although the presentation is not specified, e.g. scale, contour interval and scale bar. Good practice requires information such as the date of the survey, the survey scale, copyright information, and proper credit for the people who produced the map (surveyor, cartographer).

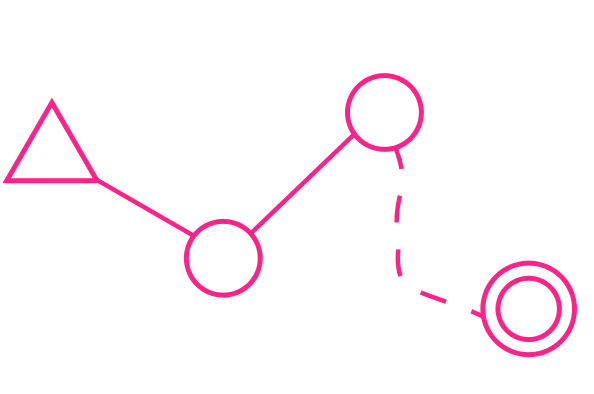
Course

=== Purple or Red: Overprinting symbols ===
Symbols are specified so that a course can be overprinted on the map. It includes symbols for the start, control points, control numbers, lines between control points, and finish. Extra symbols are available so that information relating to that event may be shown, e.g. crossing points, forbidden route, first aid post, and refreshment point, etc. These are not permanent features and cannot be included when the map is printed.

=== Related activities ===
The International Specification for Orienteering Maps sets out the specifications for orienteering maps for use in foot orienteering, together with specifications for the other sports governed by the International Orienteering Federation (IOF), i.e. mountain bike orienteering, ski orienteering, and trail orienteering. The specifications are mostly the same, but with a few sport-specific symbols, e.g. ski-o needs to distinguish snow-covered roads from cleared roads.

== Mapping process ==
The mapping process has four main stages: Creation of the base map, field-work, drawing, and printing.

=== Base map ===
The base map can be a topographic map made for other purposes, e.g. mapping from the National Mapping Agency, or a photogrammetric plot produced from an aerial survey.

As LIDAR-surveying advances, base maps consisting of 1-meter contours and other data derived from the LIDAR data are becoming more common. As these base maps contain large amounts of information, the cartographic generalisation becomes important in creating a readable map.

=== Magnetic north ===
Cartographers use a projection to project the curved surface of the earth onto a flat surface. This generates a grid that is used as a base for national topographic mapping. The projection introduces a distortion so that grid north differs from true north; magnetic north is a natural feature that differs from both. As an example: at 52° 35' N 1° 10' E (approx 7 km west of Norwich, England) true north is 2° 33' west of grid north, and magnetic north is about 7° west of grid north. Magnetic north varies continually and in this example (1986) was reducing by about 1/2° in four years. Orienteering maps are printed using magnetic north and this requires an adjustment to be made to the base map.

=== Field-work ===
Field-work is carried out using a small part of the base map fixed to a survey board, covered with a piece of draughting film, and drawn with pencils. Some map-drawing software has been adapted to make it easy to use a tablet to take notes in the field.

The final map needs to be drawn with sufficient accuracy so that a feature shown on the map can be identified clearly on the ground by the competitor; thus, field-workers need to locate features with a high level of accuracy to ensure consistency between the map and the terrain. Where the map and terrain are inconsistent, the feature becomes unusable: no control point can be placed there. Periodic corrections to the map may be necessary, typically due to vegetation changes in forested areas.

=== Drawing (cartography) ===
==== Corrected topographic maps ====
The earliest orienteering maps used existing topographic maps e.g. United Kingdom Ordnance Survey 1:25 000 plans. These were cut down to a suitable size, corrected by hand, and then copied.

==== Hand-drawn orienteering maps ====
===== Hand-drawn maps =====
These were initially drawn by hand on tracing paper using one sheet for each of the five colours; the various dot or line screens being added using dry transfer screens, for example, Letratone manufactured by Letraset in the UK. The map was drawn at twice the final map scale, and photographically reduced to produce the five film positives for printing. This was a simple process that required very few specialist tools. Draughting film has replaced tracing paper. This is a plastic waterproof material etched on one side so that the ink will hold.

===== Scribed maps =====
This is the standard process used by National Mapping Agencies. It uses a plastic film, which is coated on one side with a photo-opaque film. The layer is removed with a scribing tool or scalpel to produce a negative image. One sheet of film is needed for each solid colour, and one for each screen, usually requiring about ten sheets of film altogether. The map is drawn at the final map scale, and the negatives are printed with high-quality dot screens to produce the five film positives for printing. The process makes it easy to produce high-quality maps, but it does require a number of specialist tools.

==== Computer-aided maps (digital cartography) ====
Computer software is available to aid in the drawing of digital maps. OCAD is the leading provider. Another one is the open-source OpenOrienteering Mapper application, created by the community as a free alternative to OCAD. Other computer software is available that will link with OCAD, or with the digital map files, so that courses can be incorporated into the map ready for printing.

=== Printing ===
Colour maps were sent to commercial printers for printing in five colours, with the overprinting being added after the map had been printed. This process was chosen as it gave a higher quality for the fine line-work than the industry standard four-colour process (CMYK). As computer and software technology have advanced, and the cost reduced, many clubs are now in a position to print their own maps. This enables clubs to print the six colours together (map and overprinting symbols) using that same four-colour process, but with a reduction in quality over traditional printing. Printing costs can be minimised by using standard stock sizes of paper, e.g. A4 or Letter. It is important to use the correct type of paper: both the weight and the coating affect the usability of the final map.

== Map accuracy and map quality ==
Map accuracy refers to the work of the surveyor (field-worker) and relates not so much to the positional accuracy of the survey but rather to its utility for the competitor. Map quality refers to the quality of the artwork. Many national bodies have a competition in which awards are made to cartographers after assessment by a national panel.
