= Orienteering =

Sport using maps and compasses

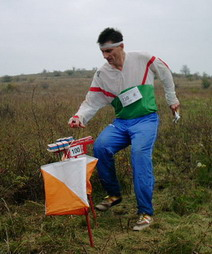
- An orienteer punching a control point
- Highest governing body: International Orienteering Federation (IOF)
- First public contest: 1897, United Kingdoms of Sweden and Norway
- Clubs: 78 national federations

Characteristics
- Contact: No
- Team members: Individuals or teams of varying size
- Mixed-sex: Mixed participation, with most competitions held in separate divisions
- Type: Outdoor
- Equipment: Compass, orienteering map

Presence
- Country or region: Worldwide
- Olympic: No
- World Championships: 1966
- World Games: 1995

Official IOF orienteering pictogram

Orienteering is a group of sports in which participants use a map and compass to navigate from point to point in unfamiliar terrain as quickly as possible.

The sport originated from military land-navigation training in the late 19th century. It has since evolved into several competitive forms where participants race against the clock and other competitors while navigating through checkpoints. Variants include automobile, underwater, mountain bike, ski, and trail orienteering. The most common form is foot orienteering, also known as FootO.

In formal foot-orienteering competitions, participants are given a specially prepared orienteering map, usually topographical, which they use to locate control points.

Orienteering is part of the World Games and the World Police and Fire Games.

== History ==
Orienteering originated in Sweden in the late 19th century. The term orientering (Swedish for "orientation") was first used in 1886 at the Military Academy Karlberg, describing navigation across unfamiliar terrain using a map and compass. The activity developed from military land navigation exercises into a civilian sport.

The first civilian competition open to the public was held in Norway in 1897, when the country was part of the Union between Sweden and Norway. In 1901, the first Swedish public event included control points at historic sites such as Spånga Church and Bromma Church, a round church.

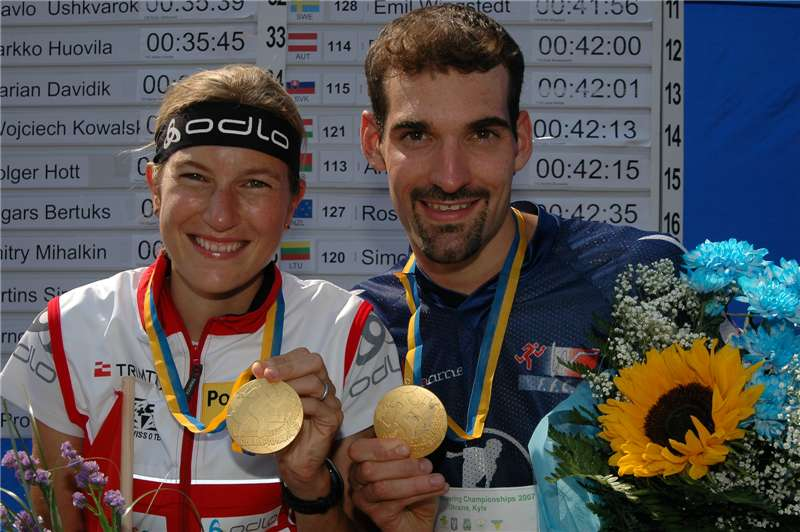
World Orienteering Championships 2007 in Kyiv, Ukraine. Winners of the middle-distance event: Simone Niggli-Luder (Switzerland) and Thierry Gueorgiou (France).

Affordable compasses helped the sport expand during the 1930s. By 1934, about 250,000 Swedes participated, and orienteering had spread to Finland, Switzerland, the Soviet Union, and Hungary. After World War II, it spread across Europe, Asia, North America, and Oceania. In 1959, Sweden hosted an international conference with delegates from 12 countries, leading to the formation of the International Orienteering Federation (IOF) in 1961. By 2010, the IOF included 71 member federations worldwide. World Championships were held biennially until 2003 and annually thereafter.

Orienteering remains most popular in Scandinavia, home to long-running events such as the Jukola relay and Tiomila, both established in the 1940s. The O-Ringen, held annually since 1965, attracts around 15,000 competitors.

The sport was originally practiced in forest terrain but later expanded to fell, heathland, and moorland areas. Urban and park orienteering became established in the 1990s and 2000s through events such as the Park World Tour, supported by dedicated urban map standards (ISSOM) and electronic timing systems. These formats are now included in national and international ranking systems.

== Variations ==
Orienteering sports combine significant navigation with a specific method of travel. Because the method of travel determines the needed equipment and tactics, each sport requires specific rules for competition and guidelines for orienteering event logistics and course design.

International Orienteering Federation, the governing body of the sport, currently sanctions the following four disciplines as official disciplines in the sport of orienteering:

- Foot orienteering (FootO)
- Mountain bike orienteering (MTBO)
- Ski orienteering (SkiO)
- Trail orienteering (TrailO)

Moreover, International Amateur Radio Union (IARU) sanctions the following orienteering sport:

- Amateur radio direction finding (Radio orienteering or ARDF) [including variants Fox Oring and Radio Orienteering in a Compact Area (ROCA)]

Other orienteering disciplines include, but are not limited to:

- Biathlon orienteering
- Canoe orienteering
- Car orienteering
- Mountain marathoning
- Mounted orienteering
- Rogaining
- Underwater orienteering (disputed; may be classified instead as a form of scuba diving)
- Sport Labyrinth – micro orienteering

Adventure racing is a combination of two or more disciplines, and usually includes orienteering as part of the race.

== Governing bodies ==
=== International ===
At international level, the International Orienteering Federation (IOF) defines rules and guidelines which govern four orienteering sports: foot orienteering, mountain bike orienteering, ski orienteering, and trail orienteering. It is based in Sweden and it claims on its website to aim to "spread the sport of orienteering, to promote its development and to create and maintain an attractive world event programme." Since 1977 the IOF has been recognised by the IOC.

=== National ===
There are governing bodies for most of the individual nations that are represented in the sport of orienteering. These national bodies are the rule-making body for that nation. For example, the British Orienteering Federation is the national governing body for the United Kingdom. The federation was founded in 1967 and it is made up of 13 constituent associations. For the United States, the national governing body is Orienteering USA.

=== Regional ===
Most nations have some form of regional governing bodies. These are not rule-making bodies but are there to assist in coordinating clubs within that region, e.g., they may allocate dates so that clubs do not clash with their events.

=== Local ===
Clubs are usually formed at a local level and affiliated to their national governing body. It is clubs who put on events usually open to all-comers. Clubs may also put on practice, training, and social events. Open clubs are open to anyone and there is usually no restriction on joining them. Closed clubs restrict their membership to specific groups. For example, BAOC (British Army Orienteering Club) has restrictions on who may join, principally British Army personnel.

=== Related sports ===
- The International Rogaining Federation governs rogaining.
- Separate organizations govern competitive mounted orienteering in the United States and Europe (and the two sports are dissimilar).
- The International Amateur Radio Union governs amateur radio direction finding.

== Competition and results ==
The international orienteering flag, typically used to mark control points

=== Basics ===
The competition, or race, is intended to test the navigational skill, concentration, and running ability of the competitors. High levels of fitness and running speed are required to compete successfully at an international or elite level. To ensure fairness between competitors the map is not usually provided until the start, and starts are normally staggered with competitors starting at not less than one-minute intervals.

The objective on each leg is to follow the fastest route between controls. The fastest is not always the shortest route, and can depend heavily on route choice.

=== Map ===
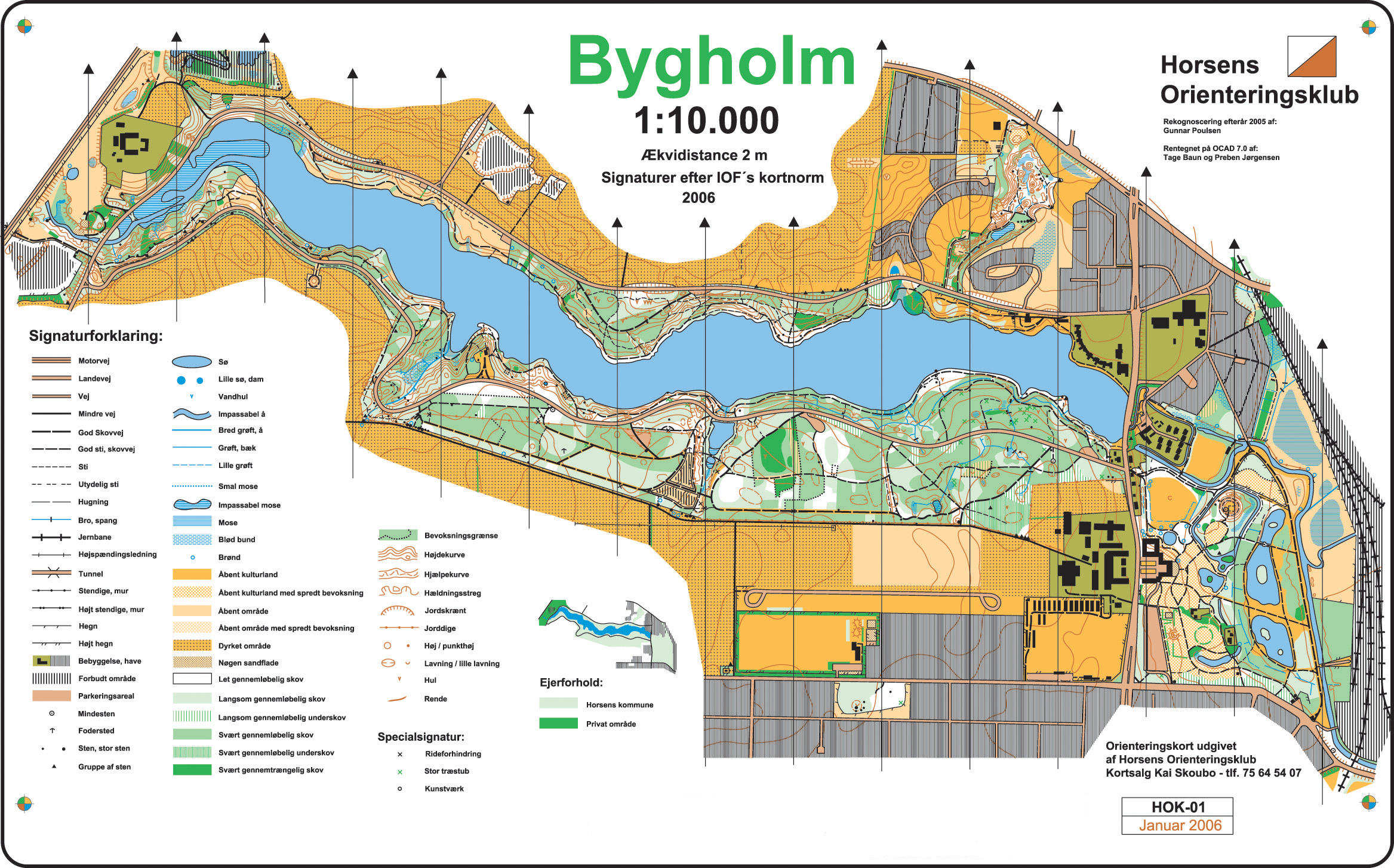
An orienteering map

Orienteering competitions use specially prepared orienteering maps. They are topographic maps although much more detailed than general-purpose maps. The ISOM map scales are 1:15,000, 1:10,000, or 1:7,500, with grids aligned to magnetic north. Map symbols are standardized by the IOF, and designed to be readable by any competitor regardless of background or native tongue.

=== Courses ===
An example of how control points are shown on an orienteering map

Orienteering events offer a range of courses, of varying physical and technical difficulty, to meet the needs of competitors. The orienteering course is marked in purple or red on a map. A triangle is used to indicate the start and a double circle indicates the finish. Circles are used to show the control points.

==== Age-related classes ====
At international, national, and the larger events, courses are classified by age, e.g., M35 for men 35 years of age and older. Classes requiring similar distances and difficulties are usually combined into a smaller number of courses, e.g., M60 will normally share a course with W50, and often with M65 and W55. The results are normally arranged by class.

==== Ability-based courses ====
In the smaller events courses are provided by ability. The United States and the United Kingdom use colour coding to define the difficulty of the courses. Short, easy courses are provided for beginners and younger competitors, with technically and physically demanding courses being provided for experienced orienteers. Ranging from easy and short to long and technical, there are; White, Yellow, Orange, Light Green, Green, Blue and Brown.

==== Permanent courses and other events ====
Some orienteering clubs have set up permanent courses, which can be used for personal, or club, training. Non-standard permanent markers are used as control kites, and maps of the courses are usually available publicly for a fee. The courses are usually set up in public areas and there may be some restrictions on access, e.g., daylight hours only. Clubs also organise informal events for practice and training.

=== Controls and control description sheet ===
Control description sheet (pictorial)

Control points are placed on features on the map that can be clearly identified on the ground. Control points are marked in the terrain by white and orange "flags".

Competitors receive a "control description sheet" or "clue sheet" which gives a precise description of the feature and the location of the kite, e.g., boulder, 5m, north side. For experienced orienteers the descriptions use symbols (pictorial), in accordance with the IOF Control descriptions.

=== Control card and punching ===
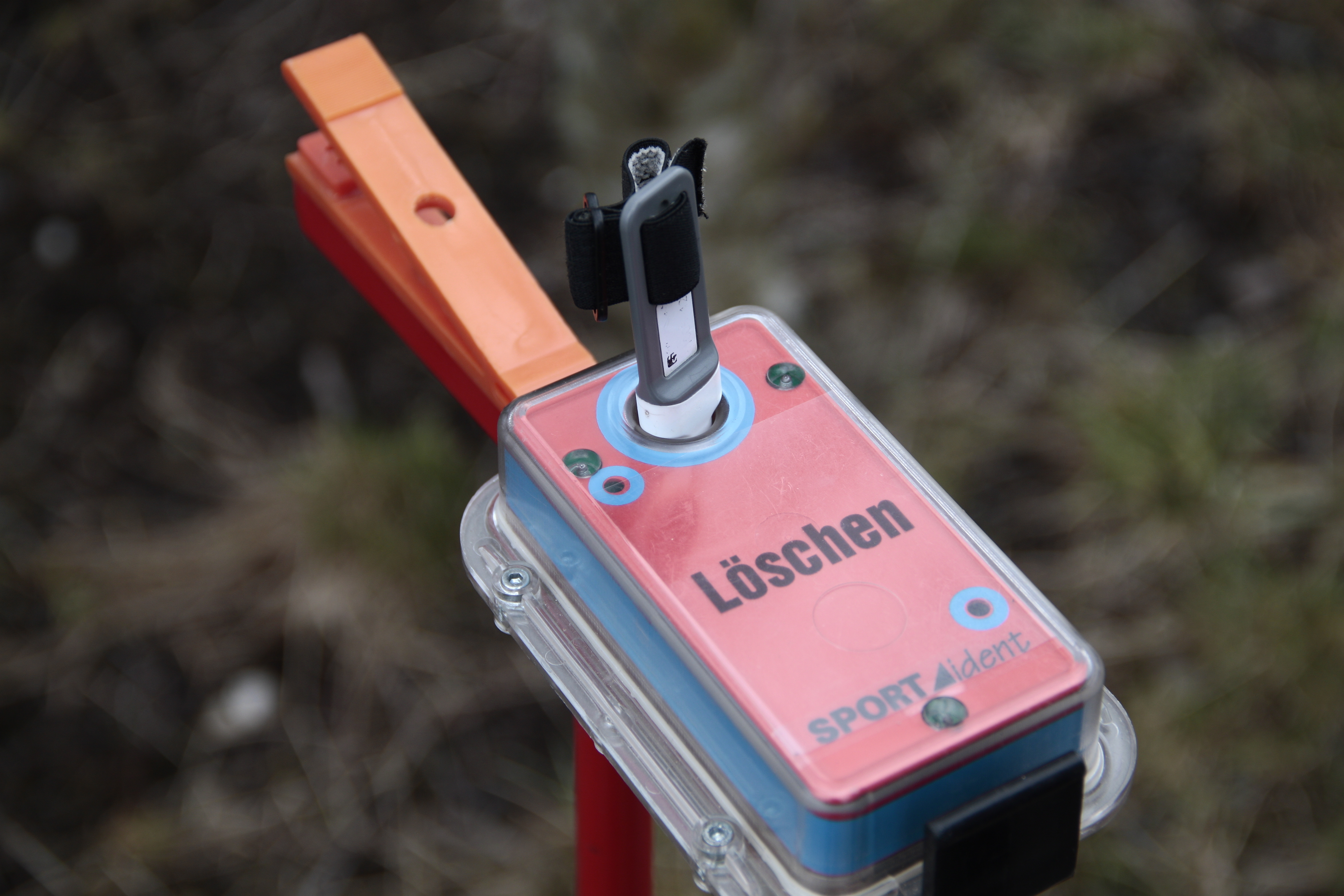
SportIdent station with electronic puncher (note that the puncher is normally worn on a finger) with a backup needle puncher attached

Each competitor is required to carry an electronic or paper control card, and to present it at the Start and hand it in at the Finish. The control card is marked by some means at each control point to show that the competitor has completed the course correctly. Most events now use electronic punching, although cards and needle punches are still widely used.

=== Results ===
The winner is normally the competitor with the fastest time, but other scoring systems can be used, e.g., score events and Trail-O. Most events produce provisional results 'on the day', with draft results on the Internet that night; the final results being confirmed a few days later. With electronic punching the results can include split times for competitors. These show the times between controls and aggregate times to each control. With suitable computer software these times can be displayed in a graphical form (Progressograph).

=== Safety ===
Each competitor is responsible for their own safety. There are no rules, but there are guidelines, which should be followed. The basic safety check was the stub check. The competitor hands in his stub at the start and his control card at the finish. Event officials match the two and any unmatched stubs represent a missing competitor. This has been superseded with electronic punching in that event officials can now request a 'still to finish' report listing all those competitors who punched at the start but have not yet downloaded their electronic card. All competitors must report to the finish whether they have completed the course or not.

=== Personal clothing ===
IOF rule 21.1 is that the specification for clothing is delegated to the national organising body, and no specific clothing is required. Unique among English speaking countries, Ireland and the UK require legs to be covered. Rule 7.1.1 requires full body cover: the torso and legs must be covered, while organizer may allow shorts (e.g., in park or street orienteering). In the United States, rule A.34.1 states that competitors are free to choose clothing that they are most comfortable in (full leg cover is not required), unless specifically stated in the meet announcement. In Australia, under the 2021 rules, 2.1.21, the choice of clothing is also left up to the competitor, and full leg cover is not required. In Canada, no specific clothing is required, but participants are encouraged to wear clothing suitable for the weather, and hiking or running shoes. Similarly in New Zealand, there are no rules in force limiting orienteers to running only in full leg cover.

The early competitors used standard athletic clothing, i.e., shorts and an athletic vest, which provided little protection for racing through undergrowth. Purpose-made lightweight nylon full-body suits were later adopted. The early O-suits were made in muted colours but modern suits are generally multi-coloured. Clubs often organise the bulk purchase of clothing, which are then made in the club colours with the club's name prominently displayed. Some competitors prefer lycra tights or leggings. Gaiters are also often worn. Lightweight studded (and often cleated) orienteering shoes are commonly used.

=== Personal equipment ===
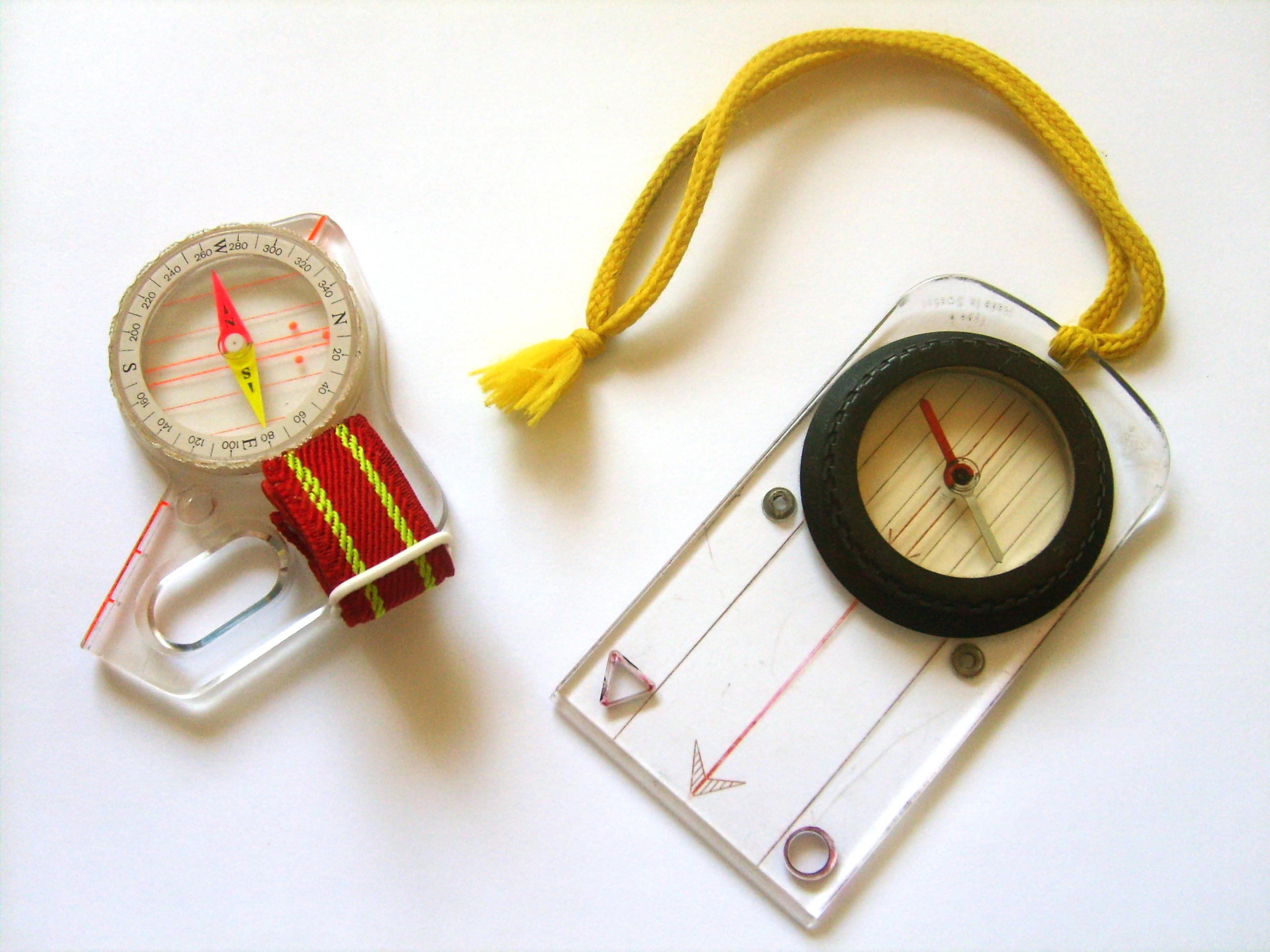
Thumb compass and protractor compass

The basic equipment required for orienteering is usually listed as a compass and appropriate outdoor clothing. Most national bodies recommend that a whistle be carried for safety reasons.

Competitive orienteers usually use specialized equipment:

- A thumb compass, or protractor compass on a short wrist cord.
- A clear map case to protect the map. May be provided by organizers in competitions.
- A clear plastic sleeve, worn on the forearm, to hold control descriptions.
- A map board, fixed to the handlebars or worn on the arm or strapped to the torso (MTB-O, Ski-o and ARDF only).
- IOF rules forbid the use of artificial aids that competitors can refer to during a race, so GPS and other electronic navigation devices are not used. (ARDF may allow them at some events). GPS logging devices that track and record position, without allowing competitors to refer to the data during the race, are permitted, and are increasingly being used for post-race route-choice analysis and live tracking for event spectators.
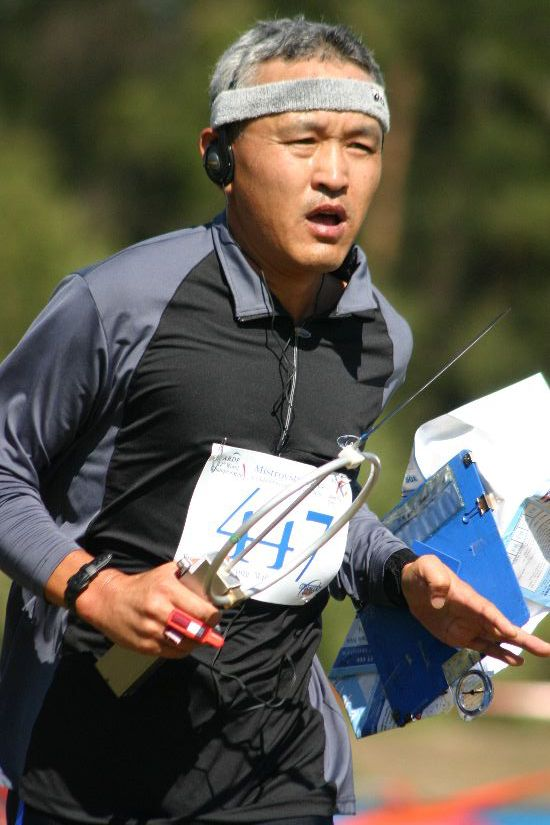
ARDF orienteer wearing a map board on his left arm

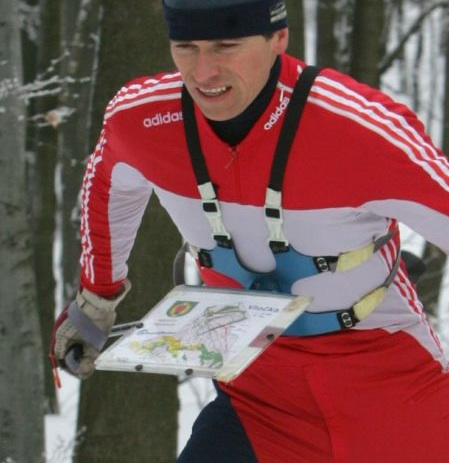
Ski orienteer wearing a map board on a torso harness

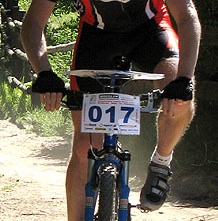
Mountain bike orienteer with a map board on bike handlebars

== Competition types ==
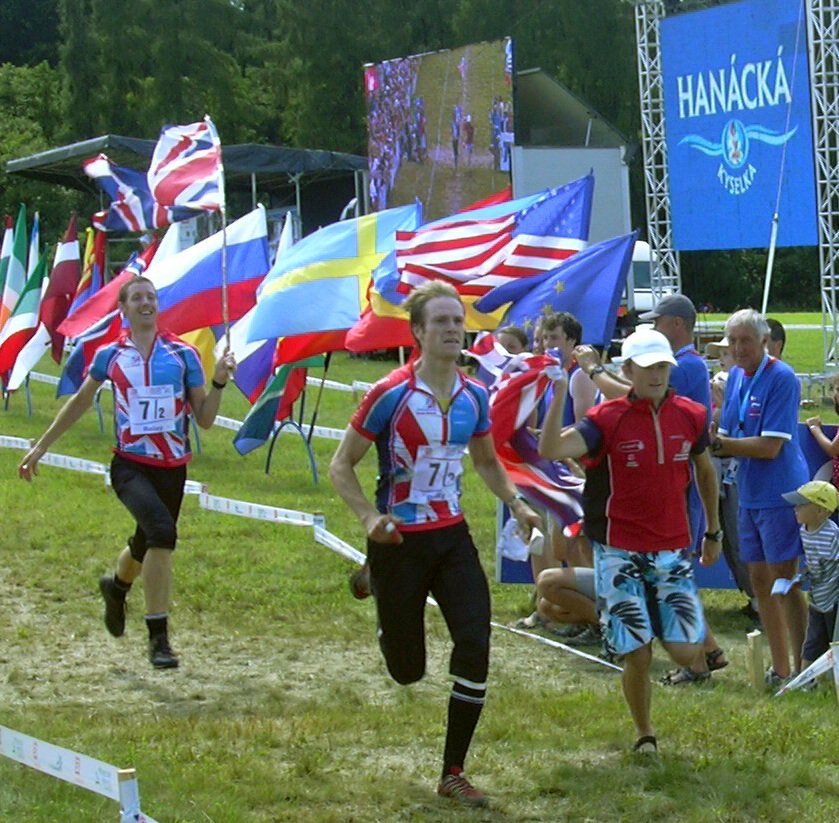
Foot-O relay, the winner crosses the line – joined by the rest of his team

Orienteering events can be classified in many different aspects:

- By method of travel: FootO, SkiO, MTBO, etc.
- By the length: sprint, middle, long
- By the time the competition was held: day, night
- By the number of competitors: individual, team, relay
- By the visiting order of controls: cross-country (in a specific order), score (free to decide order)

=== Long ===
Classic orienteering involves a race between controls in a preset order. The winner is the person who completes the course in the shortest time. This is called a "cross-country" course as distinct from a score course (see below). Courses are normally designed so that the fastest route is not straightforward to find on the map, or to follow on the ground. The classic race has a typical winning time of 75–90 minutes. As of 2007, the IOF have dictated that the "classic" course should be redesignated the "long".

=== Middle ===
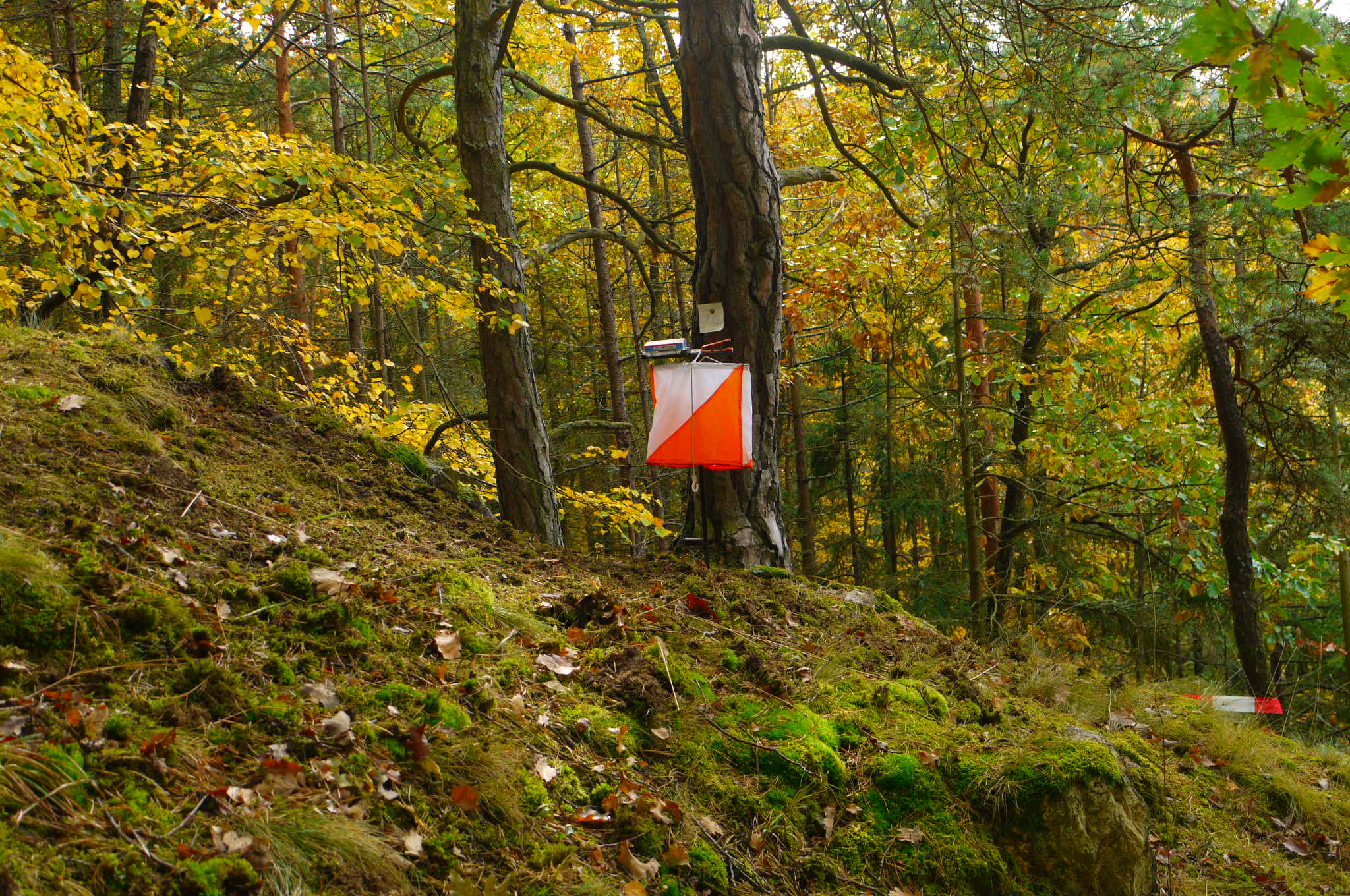
An orienteering control

The middle distance is a shorter cross-country race than the classic (or long), with a winning time in the region of 30 minutes and with an emphasis more on fine navigation than route-choice. When races of this distance were run in the mid-late 1990s, they were called "short" races, or "sprint-O". The short distance was introduced as a world championship discipline in 1991. More recently, though the IOF have renamed this distance as "middle".

=== Relay ===
A relay race is run by a team of competitors each running a course, and the result is based on the team's total time. Relays usually employ a mass start instead of a staggered start. Relays are part of World Orienteering Championships both as sprint relays and as cross-country relays. Additionally, there are popular mass club races out of which Jukola relay has the highest number of participating clubs 1,787 (in 2015), while 25-manna has the highest number of legs 25. To reduce competitors following each other, various spreading methods might be used. This is called "gaffling", which is a Swedish word meaning "forking". The key principle is that every team must run every leg (between each pair of two controls), but not necessarily in the same order. The IOF have introduced the nomenclature to try to clarify the usage of the word "leg". In orienteering usage, leg normally refers to the part of a race between two control points. In relay (non-orienteering) usage, leg refers to the part of a race run by a single team member. The IOF prefer "lap" for this latter term, but despite this, in common parlance, "leg" is used for both terms.

=== Score ===
Competitors visit as many controls as possible within a time limit. There is usually a mass start (rather than staggered), with a time limit. Controls may have different point values depending on difficulty, and there is a point penalty for each minute late. The competitor with the most points is the winner. The large-scale, endurance-style version of a Score-O is known as a rogaine, competed by teams in events lasting (often) 24 hours. A very large area is used for competition, and the map scale is smaller. The format originated in Australia. The term ROGAINE is often said to stand for Rugged Outdoor Group Activity Involving Navigation and Endurance; this is essentially a backronym, as the name actually originates from the names of Rod, Gail and Neil Phillips, who were among Australian Rogaining's first participants.

=== Sprint ===
Very short races, with winning times in the region of 12–15 minutes, often held in city parks and other more urban settings. Map scales are usually 1:5,000 or 1:4,000. Control sites can include benches, litterbins, sculptures, and other objects common to urban parks. The sprint distance may also be held in the forest, when it would be called a "forest sprint" as opposed to an "urban sprint". This distance was pioneered in the late 1990s as an elite event by the Park World Tour organisation who organised an independent "world cup" in park sprint orienteering. In 2001 in Tampere, the IOF included a sprint distance in the orienteering world championships.

=== Ultrasprint ===
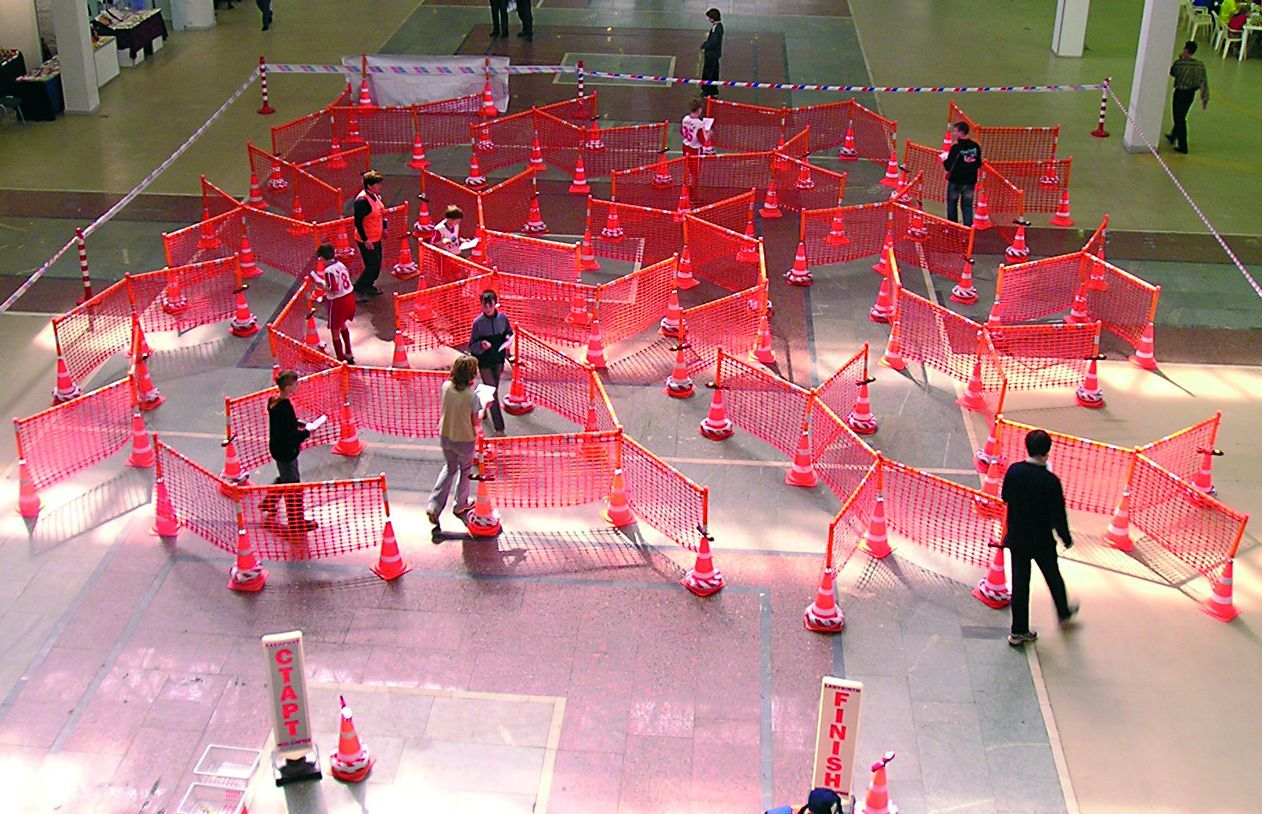
A setting for indoor ultrasprint orienteering

Ultrasprint events are held in a specially constructed labyrinth. Due to the limited area of the labyrinth, ultrasprint is a more spectator-friendly form of orienteering. Also, as the course is artificial, identical courses can be set in different geographical locations for simultaneous local competitions as parts of a larger tournament.

=== Night ===
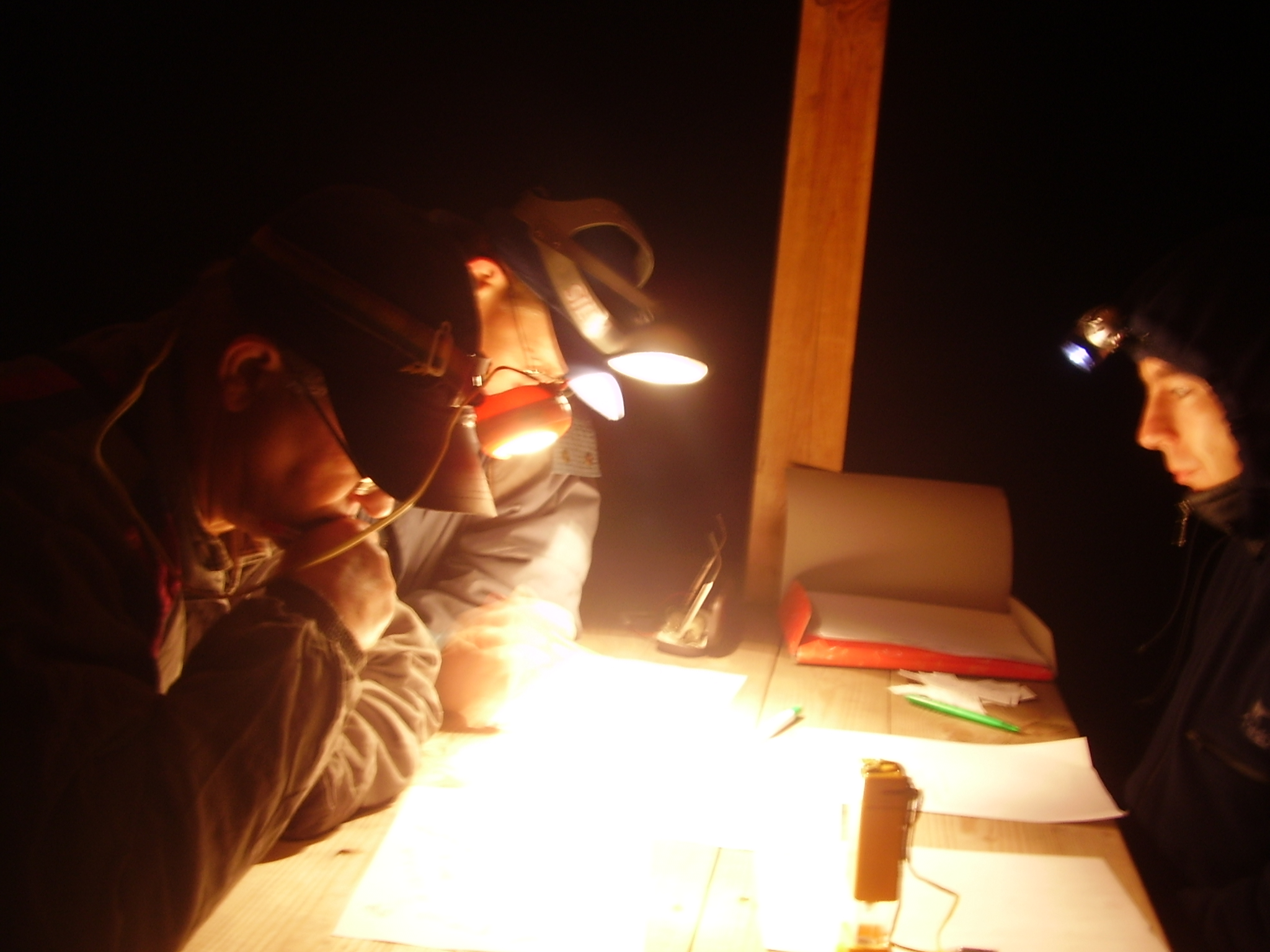
Studying the map at the start of a night orienteering competition, or "night-o"

Competitors use a headlamp to navigate in the dark. Reflective markers often are used on control point flags, which shifts the tactics from precision navigation to searching. Competitors can travel at high speed to the vicinity of the control point, then sweep the area with the light to catch a reflection off the control flag. If a night event starts before dark, a mass start must be used so all competitors have equal time in the light and dark. The two classic club relays, Tiomila and Jukola, both include night legs. Full length (24-hour) rogaines and many adventure races run through the night, without a light period, and competitors may choose not to rest.

=== String ===
Competitors follow a string around a short course, noting down things that they find on the way. This is generally used by young children and people new to the sport who want to find out what it is like.

=== Precision ===
Precision orienteering generally is not a speed event, but rather a test of the competitors' ability to precisely match map and terrain. Examples include trail-O (untimed), TREC style mounted orienteering, and Radio Orienteering in a Compact Area (ROCA). Both trail-O and ROCA use decoys in the vicinity of the control point.

== The Olympics ==
Efforts begun in 1996 to promote the inclusion of orienteering in the Olympic Games have so far been unsuccessful, although orienteering became a sport in the World Games in 2001, and is a sport in the Summer Deaflympics. Supporters recognize that the sport is neither television- nor spectator-friendly, the venue of competition is often necessarily remote from major cities, and the duration of the event is longer than most other individual competitions. Efforts to develop a format suitable for Olympic competitions have focused on park orienteering, micro-orienteering, and short-distance relays. Sprint Orienteering on foot as a format of the sport is most likely to be included in Olympic Games, as this discipline is becoming more and more popular worldwide and can have a significant spectator interest. According to the website of a Chicago Orienteering club, "the International Orienteering Federation is committed to entering the Olympic World."

Although not an official demonstration sport, an international ski-orienteering event was held in Sugadaira Kōgen, Japan, as part of the International Cultural Festival held in conjunction with the XVIII Winter Olympic Games in Nagano in 1998. The International Orienteering Federation petitioned the International Olympic Committee in 2002 to include ski orienteering in the 2006 Winter Olympic Games, noting that it could share the venue with the biathlon competitions. In its formal recommendation that ski orienteering not be included in those games, the Olympic Programme Commission focused on a lack of participation in the sport outside Nordic countries, "the challenges for broadcasters and spectators to easily follow the competition", and the costs associated with new technology and a new results system. In 2005, the International Olympic Committee confirmed that ski orienteering was under consideration for inclusion in the review process of the Olympic sport program for the 2014 Winter Olympic Games. On 28 November 2006, the Executive Board of the IOC decided not to include any new sports in this review process.

== Events ==
=== World Orienteering Championships ===
The World Orienteering Championships (WOC) is an annual event organised by the International Orienteering Federation. The first World Championships was held in Fiskars, Finland in 1966. They were held biennially up to 2003 (with the exception of 1978 and 1979). Since 2003, competitions have been held annually.

The format of the World Orienteering Championships alternates every 2 years, with even years hosting sprint format events and odd years hosting forest format events. As of 2019, when applying the Olympic-style gold first rankings method to medals won at the World Orienteering Championships, Europe has been dominant, with Sweden's 171 medals won marking them as the most successful world championships nation.

=== World Games ===
Orienteering has been a part of the World Games program since 2001.

=== European Championships ===
As Orienteering is a sport practiced primarily in Europe, the European Orienteering Championships is also an important event in the orienteering calendar. As of 2021, the European Championships is held in tandem with the World Championships, with the European Championships hosting the Sprint events when the World Championships hosts the Forest events and vice versa.

=== World Cup ===
The annual Orienteering World Cup is hosted over a number of events throughout the year, with winners of the overall world cup being awarded following the final event.

=== World University Orienteering Championships ===
The World University Orienteering Championships are hosted biannually.

=== Junior World Championships ===
The Junior World Championships has been held every year since 1990.

=== European Youth Orienteering Championships ===
The European Youth Championships are the main international event for Junior orienteers below the age of 18.

=== O-Ringen ===
A multi-day event with open entry held in different locations in Sweden, O-Ringen is the largest multi-day orienteering event in the world.

=== Jukola relay ===
A night relay with open entry held in different locations in Finland, Jukola is the largest relay orienteering event in the world. Jukola is considered equal to Tiomila as the most prestigious event in club orienteering.

=== Tiomila ===
A night relay with open entry held in different locations in Sweden, Tiomila is considered equal to Jukola as the most prestigious event in club orienteering.

== Semiotic research ==
Finding the way around the outdoors is still very important. When people visit national parks or other wild lands, they need to know where they are going on trails and paths. Over the years nature changes. Trees grow and fall over, wildfires occur, and floods take place. Therefore, signage and environmental markers need to change too. In one study, National Park staff asked 36 participants to think out loud while going through the park, reading the park map, and interpreting signage throughout the park. The researchers analyzed and reviewed the participants' comments to evaluate signage design and placement. This helped the staff understand how to improve signage so that hikers felt more at ease and oriented. Novice hikers, especially, may not understand non-textual hiking signs such as blazes, cairns, and ducks.

Other studies have focused on novice orienteers solving orienteering tasks. One involved eight hiking volunteers. Half did a recording and audio during the hike while half verbalized after the hike what they saw and experienced. Hikers described their orienteering activity and made suggestions on how to improve the teaching of orienteering and orienteering practices.

A central problem is map reading skills and understanding the imprecision of maps as a scaled down abstraction of an area at a single point in time. Hikers unused to orienteering often lack these skills and this understanding. Also, there are many kinds of maps, people need to be aware of the differences, what type of maps will work best for them, and particular issues such as scale and magnetic declination.

Semiotics is an important tool to improve one's understanding of maps and way-finding in the outdoors. Topography and symbols for water, trees, private vs. public land etc. are all important semiotic markers for reading maps, orienteering, and finding one's way around the wilderness. Map symbols need to be simple, understandable, and meet professional cartography standards. Carto semiotics helps make sense of symbols used in different types of maps such as globes, relief models, and animations. Carto semiotics also includes the study of map keys, legends, and units of measurement between destinations.

== See also ==
- Adventure racing
- Cross-country running
- Fastpacking
- Fell running
- Geocaching
- Letterboxing
- Off-trail hiking
- Rallying (Rally raid)
- Trail blazing
- Underwater orienteering
- Wayfinding
- Rogaining
