= Riksidrottsgymnasium =

Swedish school specialising in sports

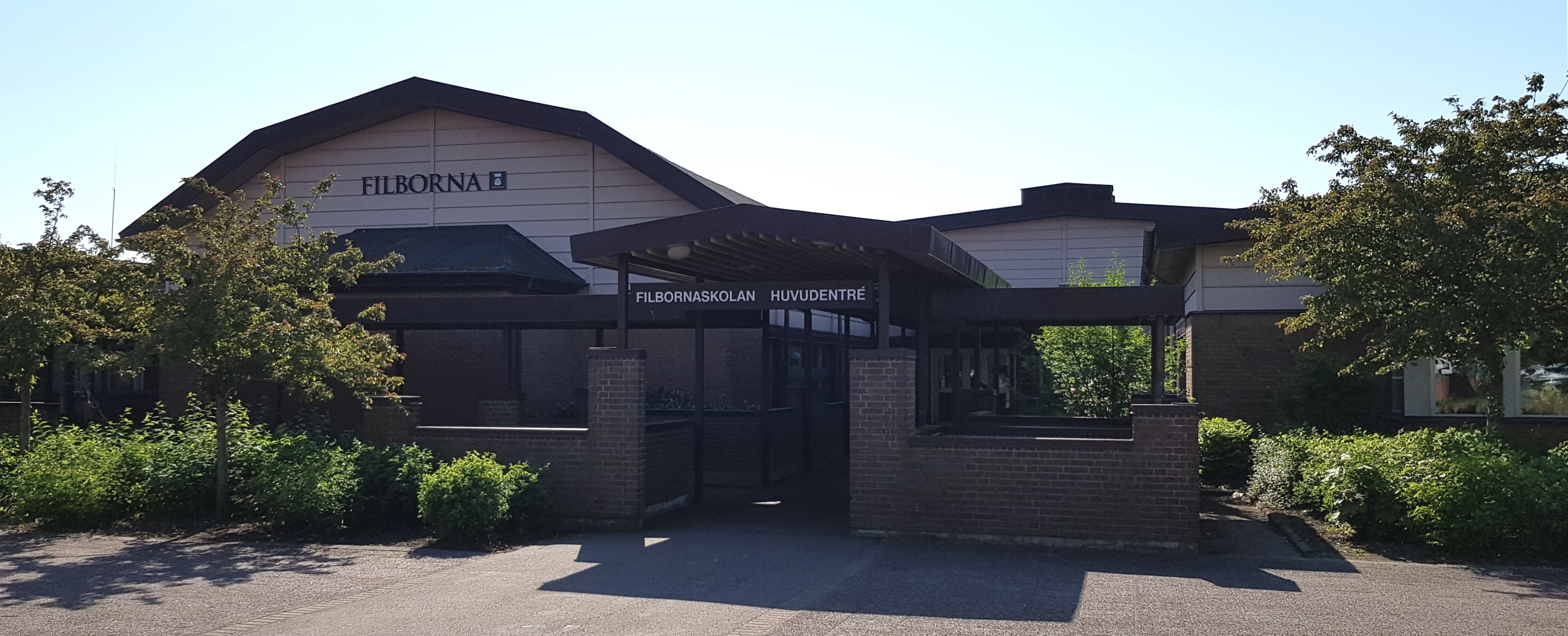
Filbornaskolan in Helsingborg, a riksidrottsgymnasium for golf and swimming

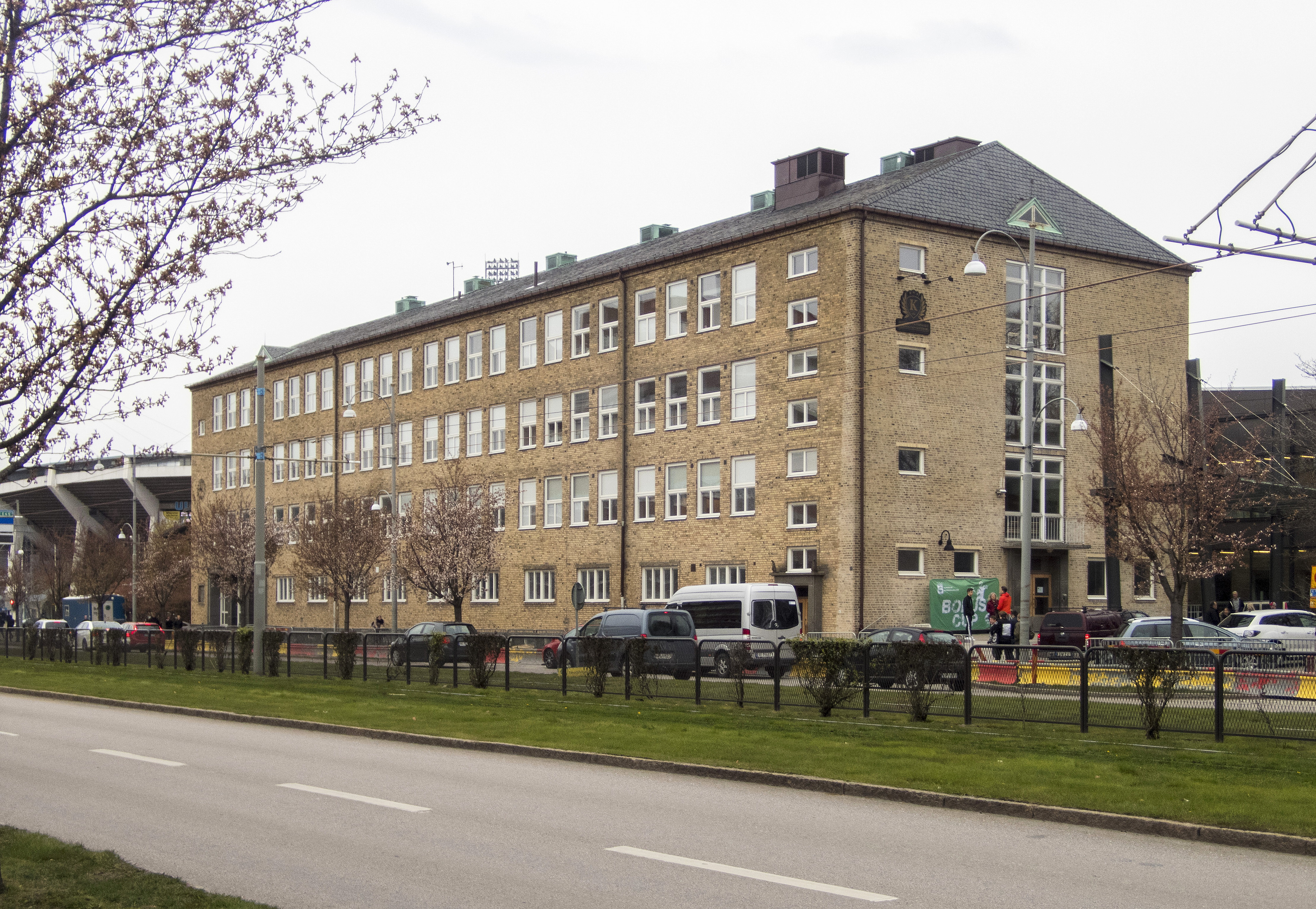
Katrinelundsgymnasiet in Gothenburg, a riksidrottsgymnasium for athletics, handball and orienteering

A riksidrottsgymnasium (RIG; lit. 'national sports' secondary school') is part of the Swedish school system as a gymnasium accepting pupils from the whole country focussing on specific sports. Schools shall organise school, living and sports specialisation for the pupils enrolled.. Riksidrottsgymnasium organisers have to be accepted by the national governing body of the sport and the National Agency for Education.

For the pupils, approximately 30 percent of the gymnasieskola credits are spent on the sport. As of 2025, 26 federations have the possibility to organise riksidrottsgymnisia.

== History ==
The first riksidrottsgymnasium started on try in 1972 in Malmö and Järpen. In the beginning, the places were limited, but in 1994 other schools had the possibilities to offer gymnasieskola credits in sports specialisation outside the riksidrottsgymnasium system. The system again changed in 2011 when a parallel system, the nationell idrottsutbildning was introduced for more local intake of pupils.

In 2019, it was highlighted a problem of who shall pay for expensive equipment – as pupils shall not pay for things in school.

In the summer of 2020, the riksidrottsgymnasium for waterskiing and wakeboarding at Brinellgymnasiet in Fagersta was closed after 20 years of education after reports on disparities.

== Impact ==
A 2010 study from University of Gothenburg study showed that 75 percent of the pupils reached a national-team level. According to a study from Karlstad University, less than a half of Sweden's international medalists have not gone to a riksidrottsgymansium. However, importance varies in between sports – seven out of nine sailors representing Sweden at the 2020 Summer Olympics had been to riksidrottsgymnasia.

== Riksidrottsgymnasia ==
Sport (discipline)	City	School	Federation	Ref
Alpine skiing	Åre	Jämtlands gymnasium	Swedish Ski Association	
Alpine skiing	Gällivare	Välkomnaskolan	Swedish Ski Association	
Alpine skiing	Malung	Malung-Sälens gymnasieskola	Swedish Ski Association	
American football	Uppsala	Celsiusskolan	Swedish Association for American Football, Flag Football and Hockey	
Athletics	Falun	Lugnetgymnasiet & Kristinegymnasiet	Swedish Athletics Federation	
Athletics	Gothenburg	Bernadottegymnasiet & Katrinelundsgymnasiet	Swedish Athletics Federation	
Athletics	Karlstad	Nobelgymnasiet, Sundsta-Älvkullegymnasiet & Tingvallagymnasiet	Swedish Athletics Federation	
Athletics	Malmö	Malmö idrottsgymnasium	Swedish Athletics Federation	
Athletics	Sollentuna	Rudbecksskolan	Swedish Athletics Federation	
Athletics	Umeå	Umeå elitidrottsgymnasium	Swedish Athletics Federation	
Athletics	Växjö	Katedralskolan & Teknikum	Swedish Athletics Federation	
Athletics (parasports)	Bollnäs	Höghammargymnasiet	Swedish Parasports Federation	
Badminton	Uppsala	Celsiusskolan	Badminton Sweden	
Basketball	Luleå	Luleå gymnasieskola	Swedish Basketball Federation	
Basketball	Norrköping	Ebersteinska gymnasiet & Hagagymnasiet	Swedish Basketball Federation	
Biathlon	Sollefteå	Sollefteå gymnasium	Swedish Biathlon Federation	
Biathlon	Torsby	Stjerneskolan	Swedish Biathlon Federation	
Bowling	Nässjö	Brinellgymnasiet	Swedish Bowling Federation	
Canoeing	Nyköping	Nyköpings gymnasium	Swedish Canoe Federation	
Cross-country skiing	Åre	Jämtlands gymnasium	Swedish Ski Association	
Cross-country skiing	Gällivare	Välkomnaskolan	Swedish Ski Association	
Cross-country skiing	Mora	Mora gymnasium	Swedish Ski Association	
Cross-country skiing	Sollefteå	Sollefteå gymnasium	Swedish Ski Association	
Cross-country skiing	Torsby	Stjerneskolan	Swedish Ski Association	
Cross-country skiing	Ulricehamn	Tingsholmsgymnasiet	Swedish Ski Association	
Curling	Härnösand	Härnösands gymnasium	Swedish Curling Federation	
Cykling (road racing and mountain biking)	Skara	Katedralskolan	Swedish Cycling Federation	
Floorball	Umeå	Umeå elitidrottsgymnasium	Swedish Floorball Federation	
Freestyle skiing	Malung	Malung-Sälens gymnasieskola	Swedish Ski Association	
Freestyle skiing (moguls)	Åre	Jämtlands gymnasium	Swedish Ski Association	
Freestyle skiing (ski cross)	Åre	Jämtlands gymnasium	Swedish Ski Association	
Golf	Helsingborg	Filbornaskolan	Swedish Golf Association	
Golf	Uppsala	Celsiusskolan	Swedish Golf Association	
Handball	Gothenburg	Bernadottegymnasiet & Katrinelundsgymnasiet	Swedish Handball Federation	
Judo (shiai)	Lindesberg	Lindeskolan	Swedish Judo Federation	
Karate (kata and kumite)	Haninge	Fredrika Bremergymnasiet	Swedish Karate Association	
Motorsport (enduro and motocross)	Sävsjö	Aleholm	Swedish Motorcycle Federation	
Orienteering	Eksjö	Eksjö gymnasium	Swedish Orienteering Federation	
Orienteering	Gothenburg	Bernadottegymnasiet & Katrinelundsgymnasiet	Swedish Orienteering Federation	
Orienteering	Hallsberg	Alléskolan	Swedish Orienteering Federation	
Orienteering	Sandviken	Bessermerskolan	Swedish Orienteering Federation	
Orienteering (ski orienteering)	Mora	Mora gymnasium	Swedish Orienteering Federation	
Rowing (Olympic)	Jönköping	Sandagymnasiet	Swedish Rowing Federation	
Sailing	Lerum	Lerums gymnasium	Swedish Sailing Federation	
Sailing	Motala	Platengymnasiet	Swedish Sailing Federation	
Sailing (kitefoiling and windfoiling)	Vellinge	Sundsgymnasiet	Swedish Sailing Federation	
Shooting (pistol and rifle)	Sävsjö	Aleholm	Swedish Shooting Sport Federation	
Snowboarding	Malung	Malung-Sälens gymnasieskola	Swedish Ski Association	
Swimming	Helsingborg	Filbornaskolan	Swedish Swimming Federation	
Swimming	Jönköping	Sandagymnasiet	Swedish Swimming Federation	
Table tennis	Halmstad	Sannarpsgymnasiet	Swedish Table Tennis Association	
Table tennis	Söderhamn	Staffangymnasiet	Swedish Table Tennis Association	
Tennis	Båstad	Akademi Båstad Gymnasium	Swedish Tennis Association	
Triathlon	Motala	Platengymnasiet	Swedish Triathlon Federation	
Volleyball (beach volleyball and volleyball)	Falköping	Ållebergsgymnasiet	Swedish Volleyball Federation	
Wrestling (freestyle and Greco-Roman)	Arboga	Vasagymnasiet	Swedish Wrestling Federation	
Wrestling (freestyle and Greco-Roman)	Klippan	Tegelbruksskolan & Åbyskolan	Swedish Wrestling Federation	
