= Olle Rimfors =

Swedish ski pioneer (1896–1994)

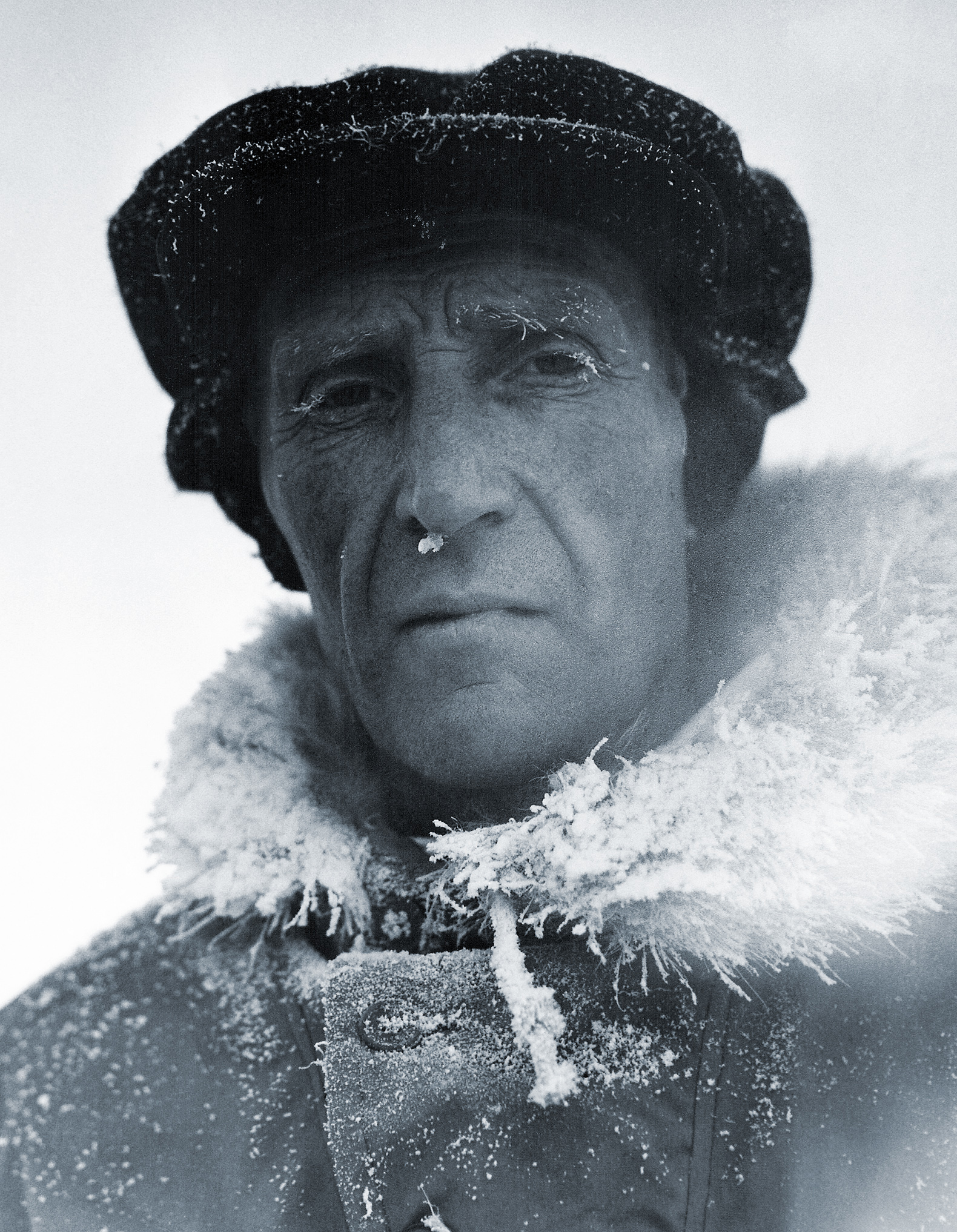
- Rimfors in 1956
- Born: Olof Alfred Andersson; 14 May 1896; Viby parish, Örebro county, Sweden
- Died: 26 February 1994 (aged 97); Åre, Sweden
- Resting place: Åre cemetery
- Education: Physiotherapist, military officer
- Occupations: Military officer 1914–1950; Head of Jämtland's Mountain Rescue 1929–1965; Secretary of Jämtland's Ski Association 1932–1941; Chairman of the Swedish Ski Association's Alpine Committee 1948–1958; Head of Skidfrämjandet's ski schools 1950–1966; Chairman of the Swedish Ski Instructor's Association 1958–1962; Physiotherapist 1962–1976
- Known for: Alpine skiing pioneer
- Children: 1
- Website: www.ollerimfors.se

Olof Alfred "Olle" Rimfors (born Andersson, 14 May 1896 – 26 February 1994) was a Swedish ski pioneer, ski instructor, military officer, and sports official. In 1934 he introduced alpine skiing in Sweden together with Sigge Bergman, after studying for a month at the ski school of Hannes Schneider in St. Anton am Arlberg and competing in the FIS Alpine World Championships.

== Ski career and legacy ==
=== The early years ===
Olle Andersson was born in the small village of Vretstorp, Örebro County. He changed his lastname to Rimfors in 1923. His father ran the village hotel, a diary, and a sawmill. When he was four years old he got his first pair of skis as a Christmas present, skis that his father had bought in Norway while trading timber, only a few months before his sudden and tragic death in 1901. Skiing was still a rare novelty in the populated parts of Sweden, so Rimfors became self-taught after persistent practice on the heights where he lived above the village.

In 1912, Rimfors joined Skidfrämjandet (the Association for the Promotion of Skiing in Sweden, now Swedish Outdoor Association) and shortly thereafter he began a career as a cross-country skier and ski jumper. He won three county championships in Västmanland-Närke for Örebro SK, in ski jumping 1921 and Nordic combined 1921 and 1922. He also won the prestigious Eberstein military competition in 1924 and the NOVOS competition in 1920, 1922, 1924 and 1930.

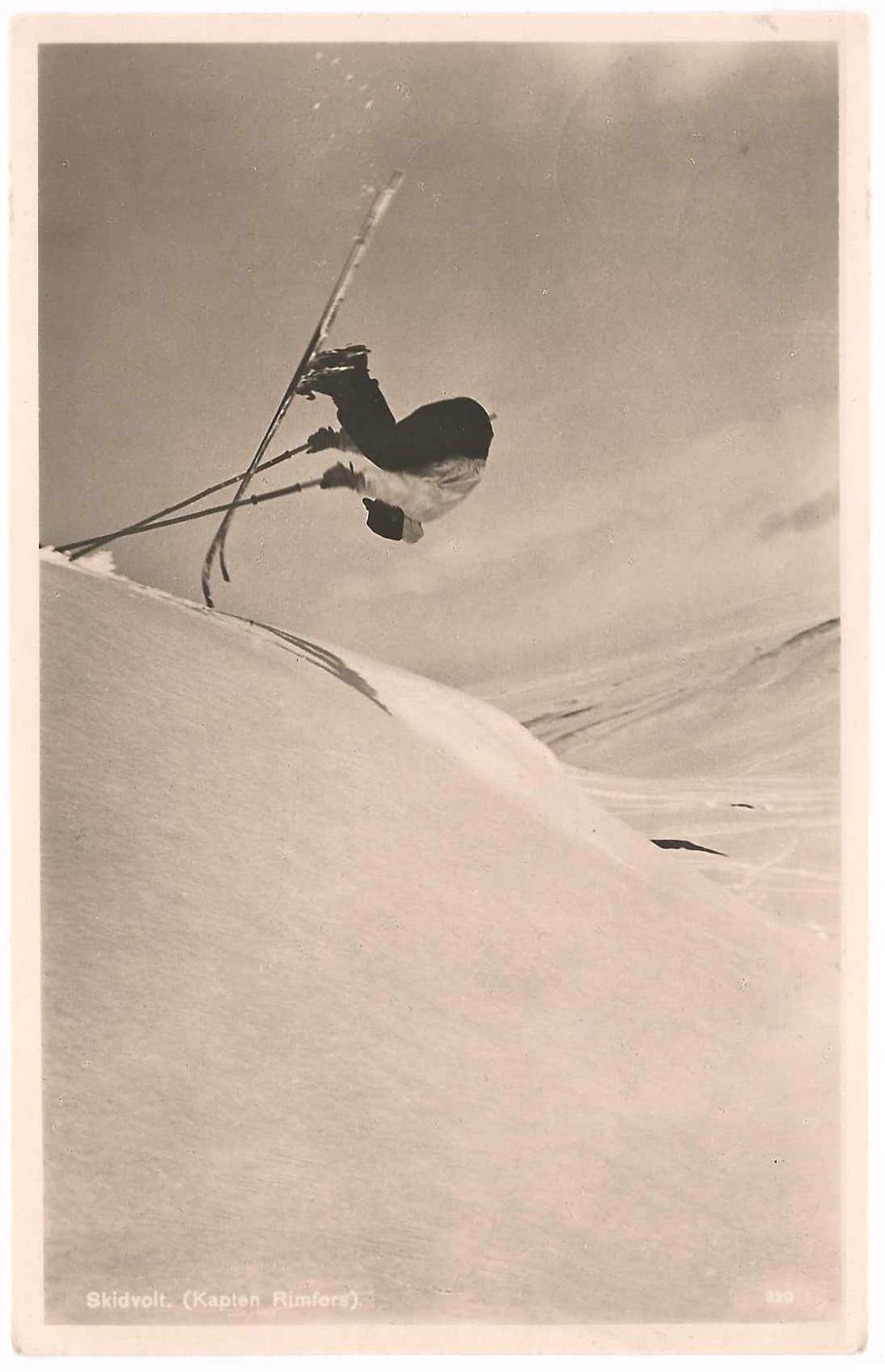
Ski pioneer Rimfors performing the forerunner of today's front flips in Storlien 1931.

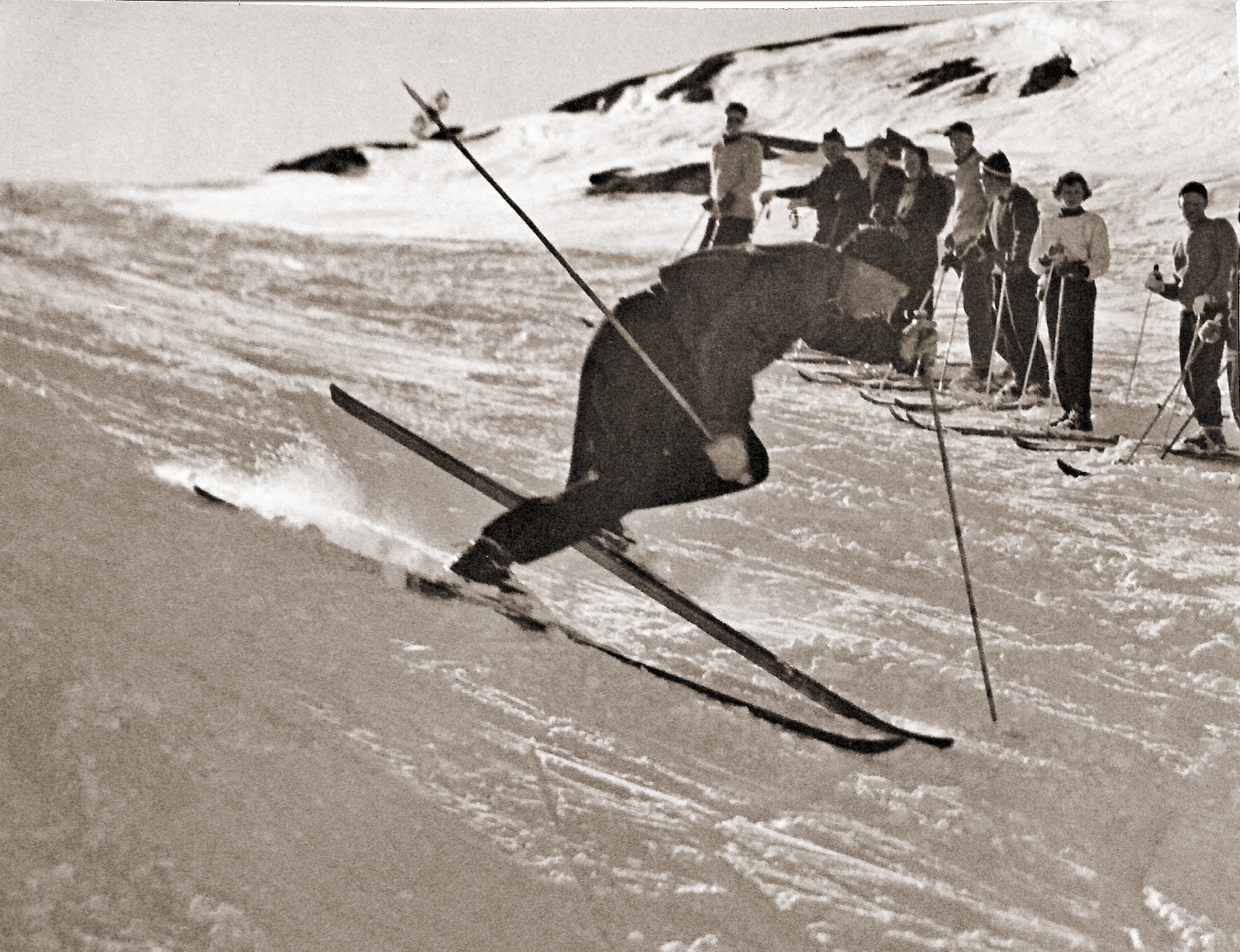
Being the head of the ski school, Rimfors demonstrates the diagonal turn in Riksgränsen around the mid 1950s.

From 1927, Rimfors was a ski instructor at Skidfrämjandet's technique courses in Storlien. In 1931 he debuted as an author with the book Handbok i skidlöpning - del 1 (Handbook in skiing – part 1). The same year he shot the first Swedish film displaying alpine skiing, Tre män på skidor (Three men on skis), together with Gunnar Dyhlén and Folke Thörn, a propaganda film for alpine skiing and Skidfrämjandet's tourist facilities in Rämshyttan, Storlien and Riksgränsen. At the same time, Rimfors' acrobatic skills spread across the country via postcards with his front flip on skis.

=== The groundbreaking 1930s ===
Inspired by Hannes Schneider's and Arnold Fanck's book Wunder des Schneeschuhs, with images from the film with the same name, Rimfors decided to study the new Arlberg technique at the source in St. Anton. The chairman of Skidfrämjandet was Ivar Holmquist. He was also the head of Jämtland Ranger Corps in Östersund, where Rimfors served as an officer, the chairman of Skidfrämjandet, and the first president of the International Ski Federation (FIS), so he sponsored Rimfors and his friend Sigge Bergman (who later became secretary general of FIS), with 150 SEK each. Since Major General Holmquist was also vice chairman of the Swedish Ski Association, Rimfors and Bergman received another 100 SEK each for their grand tour to the Alps.

On 21 January 1934, they left for St Anton. Rimfors and Bergman rapidly progressed in Hannes Schneider's ski school, also learning how to adapt Swedish equipment to alpine conditions. After one month with Schneider's best teacher, they went on to the 1934 FIS alpine championships (later recognized as the official World Championships). Representing Sweden, Rimfors finished 37th place in slalom and 39th place in downhill.

After returning from the Alps in 1934, Rimfors began to propagate for alpine skiing according to the new Arlberg technique. Rimfors and Bergman's book about their adventures, På skidor i Alperna (On skis in the Alps) became a blockbuster when it was released before Christmas 1934. The public interest grew rapidly for the new alpine sport, also as a form of recreational activity. On 2 January 1935, together with Ivar Holmquist, Gunnar Dyhlén, Folke Thörn and Helge Lindau, he formed Sweden's first slalom club, Skidfrämjandet's slalomklubb. Inspired by Hannes Schneider's system, Rimfors, together with Holmquist and Bergman, founded and organized Sweden's first ski school, Skidfrämjandet's ski school, in Storlien and Riksgränsen, opening during New Year 1934–35. That same winter, he launched the first Swedish alpine ski, Captain Rimfors' model, through L. A. Jonsson's ski factory in Östersund, the first industrial ski factory in the world.

The following years, Rimfors constructed more than forty ski slopes around Sweden, including Bruksvallarna, Bräcke, Edsbyn, Funäsdalen, Hamrafjäll, Klövsjö, Storlien, Sundsvall, Tänndalen, Tärnaby, Vemdalen, Åre, and Östersund. Together with Holmquist, he had been promoting a national championship in alpine skiing, and in 1937 he organized the first Swedish championship in slalom, held in Gustavsbergsbacken on Frösön in Östersund on 4 April 1937. On 27 June, the same year, Rimfors, together with Skidfrämjandet and the Swedish Ski Association, established the Swedish Ski Instructor's Diploma, also inspired by the Austrian model, to regulate the issue of ski instructors. On 5 February 1938, the first ski instructors passed the new Swedish exams.

=== The origin of the successful Stenmark slalom turn ===
In 1952 at the Oslo winter Olympics, Rimfors was leader and coach of the Swedish alpine squad. Observing all the nationalities training at the Norefjell and Rødkleiva Olympic courses, Rimfors noticed that the Norwegian champion Stein Eriksen, had modified the predominant slalom technique of the racers, the French parallel kick turn ruade. Standing behind the racers Rimfors noticed that the sun did not reflect simultaneously on both skis while Eriksen turned around the gates. Stein Eriksen had developed the kick turn further, and lifted the inner ski slightly, gaining a little more momentum from the outer ski than the other racers.

Inspired by Eriksen's new technique Rimfors spent the next few years developing it even further. He called it "diagonal turn", intending to make it the official technique in Swedish ski schools. Since he was head of the ski school in Hemavan, the neighbor village of Tärnaby, he spent a lot of time in Tärnaby as well, not only mapping out ski slopes, but also training Tärnaby talents, among them Erik Stenmark, father of the most successful alpine ski racer ever, Ingemar Stenmark. When the new Austrian ski technique was presented at the international Interski congress in Storlien in 1957, Rimfors decided to abandon the diagonal turn in favor for the new Austrian Wedeln technique.

In the rural village of Tärnaby, the diagonal turn survived, and was refined even further by the young kid of Ingemar Stenmark. Later on, as Stenmark dominated the slalom and giant slalom races, the technique was renamed klivsväng (step turn), a more suitable name.

=== Organizing ski instruction and mountain rescue ===
In 1939, Rimfors, together with Gustaf Birch-Lindgren, David "Mr Jones" Jonason, Sven Swärd and others, founded Svenska Iglooklubben (the Swedish Igloo Club), whose main task is to promote extended ski trips in the high mountains. In 1958, Rimfors founded Svenska Skidlärarföreningen (the Swedish Ski Instructors Association) and was also its first chairman (and interim chairman from January 1957). He was also a board member of Skidfrämjandet, board member of L. A. Jonsson's ski factory, and head of the Jämtland mountain rescue 1929–1965. Rimfors was also sports official and coach for Sweden's alpine team at the 1948 and 1952 Winter Olympics.

During 1948–1958, Rimfors was chairman and founder of the Swedish Ski Association's Slalom Committee, the forerunner of today's Alpine Committee. Between 1950 and 1966, he was also head of the ski school at Skid- och Friluftsfrämjandet's mountain resorts in Sälen, Storlien, Hemavan and Riksgränsen.

== Products and ski equipment ==
Rimfors contributed to the development of ski equipment and designed his own brands of ski bindings, skis, poles, wax, etc. He rationalized the ski waxing methodology with his waxing chart. In the late 1920s, he also developed the purpose-built pulk, Rimforspulkan, for winter expeditions in the mountains. Rimforspulkan and the Rimfors ski poles are back in production.

- Löjtnant Rimfors skidbindning (Lieutenant Rimfors' ski binding), from 1922 by AB Randfabriken Cimbria (Simrishamn, Sweden).
- Rimfors vallningstabell (Rimfors' waxing chart), from 1927 through EM Björnson (Östersund, Sweden).
- Rimforspulkan, by AB Englund & Kjelsson (Östersund, Sweden), Sollefteå ski factory (Sollefteå, Sweden), Solatun Sport (Sollefteå, Sweden) and Segebaden (Östersund, Sweden).
- Rimfors skidvalla (Rimfors' ski waxes), through EM Björnson (Östersund, Sweden).
- Rimforsstaven (Rimfors' ski poles), from 1933 by AB Englund & Kjelsson (Östersund, Sweden).
- Kapten Rimfors slalomskida (Captain Rimfors slalom ski), from the winter of 1934–35 by L.A. Jonsson's ski factory (Östersund, Sweden)
- Rimfors-Bergmans hårdgrundvalla (Rimfors-Bergman's base wax), from the winter of 1934–35 by Skidfrämjandet (Stockholm, Sweden)

== Bibliography ==
- Handbok i skidlöpning – Del 1, Terränglöpning, 1931 (co-writer Gunnar Dyhlén), Skidfrämjandet
- På skidor i Alperna, 1934 (co-writer Sigge Bergman), Hugo Gebers Förlag
- Handbok i skidlöpning – Del 3, Slalom och störtlopp, 1935 (co-writer Sigge Bergman), Skidfrämjandet
- Skidhandboken, 1944 (co-writer Ivar Holmquist, Sigge Bergman et al.), Skid- och Friluftsfrämjandet,
- Fysisk träning, häfte 4 – Skidlöpning, 1955, Försvarsmakten
- Utförsåkning, 1959 (co-writers Paul Högberg and Torsten Kjessel), Rabén & Sjögren
- Fysisk träning, häfte 4 – Skidlöpning, 1961, Försvarsmakten (revised edition)
- Avancerad nordisk skidteknik (not published entirely. Parts published in the yearbook of Sveriges alpina skidklubb: Alpin Skidsport 1980.)

== Selected filmography ==
- Tre män på skidor, 1931 (Skidfrämjandet och AMF)
- På skidor i Alperna – skidsportliv i Österrike och Schweiz, 1934 (privat)
- Igloo, 1936 (SF)
- Rationell Skidträning, 1937 (AMF)
- Fältjägarregementet, 1946 (AMF)
- Militär skidutbildning, 1955 (AMF)
- Snöbivack, 1957 (AMF)
- Pulkdragning, 1957 (AMF)
- Med Gymnastik- och Idrottsskolan i Storlien, 1957 (AMF)
