= Näsviken =

Näsviken may refer to:

- Näsviken, Hudiksvall Municipality, Sweden
- Näsvikens IK
- Näsviken, Strömsund Municipality, Sweden
