= Swedish Sports Confederation =

Swedish national confederation for sport

- Riksidrottsförbundet
- Abbreviation: RF
- Founded: 31 May 1903; 122 years ago
- Headquarters: Idrottens hus, Stockholm
- Chairman: Anna Iwarsson

Official website
- rf.se
- (Sweden)

The Swedish Sports Confederation (Swedish: Riksidrottsförbundet, RF) is the umbrella organisation of the Swedish sports movement founded in 1903. Through its member organisations, it has three million members in 22,000 clubs. Its present chair, since 2024, is Anna Iwarsson.

The Swedish Sports Confederation has its offices at Idrottens hus by Skanstull in Stockholm.

== History ==
=== Foundation ===
The Swedish Sports Confederation was founded at the Royal Central Gymnastics Institute on 31 May 1903 under the name Svenska Gymnastik- och Idrottsföreningarnas Riksförbund (lit. 'Swedish Gymnastics Clubs and Sports Clubs National Federation'). 35 sports clubs were present at the founding meeting for the organisation that soon organised itself as a confederation of specific sports governing bodies. The first chairman of the board was Crown Prince Gustaf Adolf.

=== 2018 hacking ===
In 2018, the Swedish Sports Confederation reported the Russian-linked group Fancy Bear was responsible for an attack on its computers, targeting records of athletes' doping tests.

=== Admission of esports ===
The Swedish Sports Confederation held a vote on admitting esports into the federation with a negative result. This had an adverse effect on the Dota 2 esports event The International 2020, which was originally planned to be hosted at the Avicii Arena in Stockholm before being postponed due to the COVID-19 pandemic. Because the event could not be covered by the exemptions from pandemic restrictions in the country that other sporting events had, it was moved to Romania in 2021.

=== Karl-Erik Nilsson ===
UEFA vice-president Karl-Erik Nilsson was elected chair of the organisation in early 2023, but left after only half a year after UEFA had admitted Russian youth teams to their tournaments.

== Tasks ==
According to the website, their tasks are to:

- Speak on behalf of the united sports movement in contacts with politicians, the government and other institutions/organisations
- Coordinate the sports movement in fields like research and development
- Provide service in areas where these cannot or don't want to build up their own competence
- In certain areas act in place of the government, e g through distributing governmental grants to sports

== Member organisations ==
Specialised sports federations affiliated to the Swedish Sports Confederation:

- Air Sports Federation
- Association for American Football, Flag Football and Hockey^{†}
- Archery Association*
- Athletics Federation^{†}
- Automobile Sports Federation
- Badminton Sweden^{†}
- Bandy Association
- Baseboll, Softboll and Lacrosse Federation^{†}
- Basketball Federation^{†}
- Biathlon Federation^{†}
- Billiards Federation
- Bowling Federation
- Boxing Federation^{†}
- Budo & Martial Arts Federation
- Canoe Federation^{†}
- Casting Federation
- Cheerleading Federation
- Climbing Federation
- Federation for Company Sport
- Cricket Federation
- Curling Federation
- Cycling Federation^{†}
- Dancesport Federation
- Dart Federation
- Deaf Sports Federation
- Equestrian Federation^{†}
- Esport Federation
- Fencing Federation^{†}
- Figure Skating Association^{†}
- Floorball Federation
- Football Association^{†}
- Frisbeesport Federation
- Functional Fitness Federation
- Golf Association
- Gymnastics Federation^{†}
- Handball Federation^{†}
- Ice Hockey Association^{†}
- Ice Sailing Association
- Icelandic Horse Association
- Judo Federation^{†}
- Karate Association
- Military Sports Federation^{†}
- Minigolf Federation
- Motorsport Federation
- Orienteering Federation
- Padel Federation
- Parasports Federation
- Petanque Federation
- Powerlifting Federation
- Rowing Federation^{†}
- Rugby Union
- Sailing Federation^{†}
- School Sports Federation
- Shooting Sport Federation^{†}
- Skateboard Federation
- Skating, Sliding and Rolling Sports Federation^{†}
- Ski Association^{†}
- Federation of Sleddog Sports
- Sportsdiving Federation
- Squash Federation
- Swimming Federation^{†}
- Table Tennis Association^{†}
- Taekwondo Union
- Tennis Federation^{†}
- Triathlon Federation
- Tug of War Federation
- University Sport Federation
- Varpa Federation
- Volleyball Federation^{†}
- Waterski & Wakeboard Federation
- Weightlifting Federation^{†}
- Wrestling Federation^{†}

^{†} also member of the Swedish Olympic Committee

Further on, the confederation is organised into 19 districts.

== Chairpeople ==
The Confederation has had the following chairpeople:

- Crown Prince Gustaf Adolf (later Gustaf VI Adolf; 1904-1933)
- Prince Gustaf Adolf, Duke of Västerbotten (1933–1947)
- Prince Bertil, Duke of Halland (1947–1991)
- Arne Ljungqvist (1991–2001)
- Gunnar Larsson (2001–2005)
- Karin Mattsson Weijber (2005–2015)
- Björn Eriksson (2015–2023)
- Karl-Erik Nilsson (2023)
- Anna Iwarsson (acting, 2023–2024)
- Anna Iwarsson (2024–present)

== See also ==
- Riksidrottsgymnasium
