= Hudiksvall =

Place in Hälsingland, Sweden

Hudiksvall, Sweden
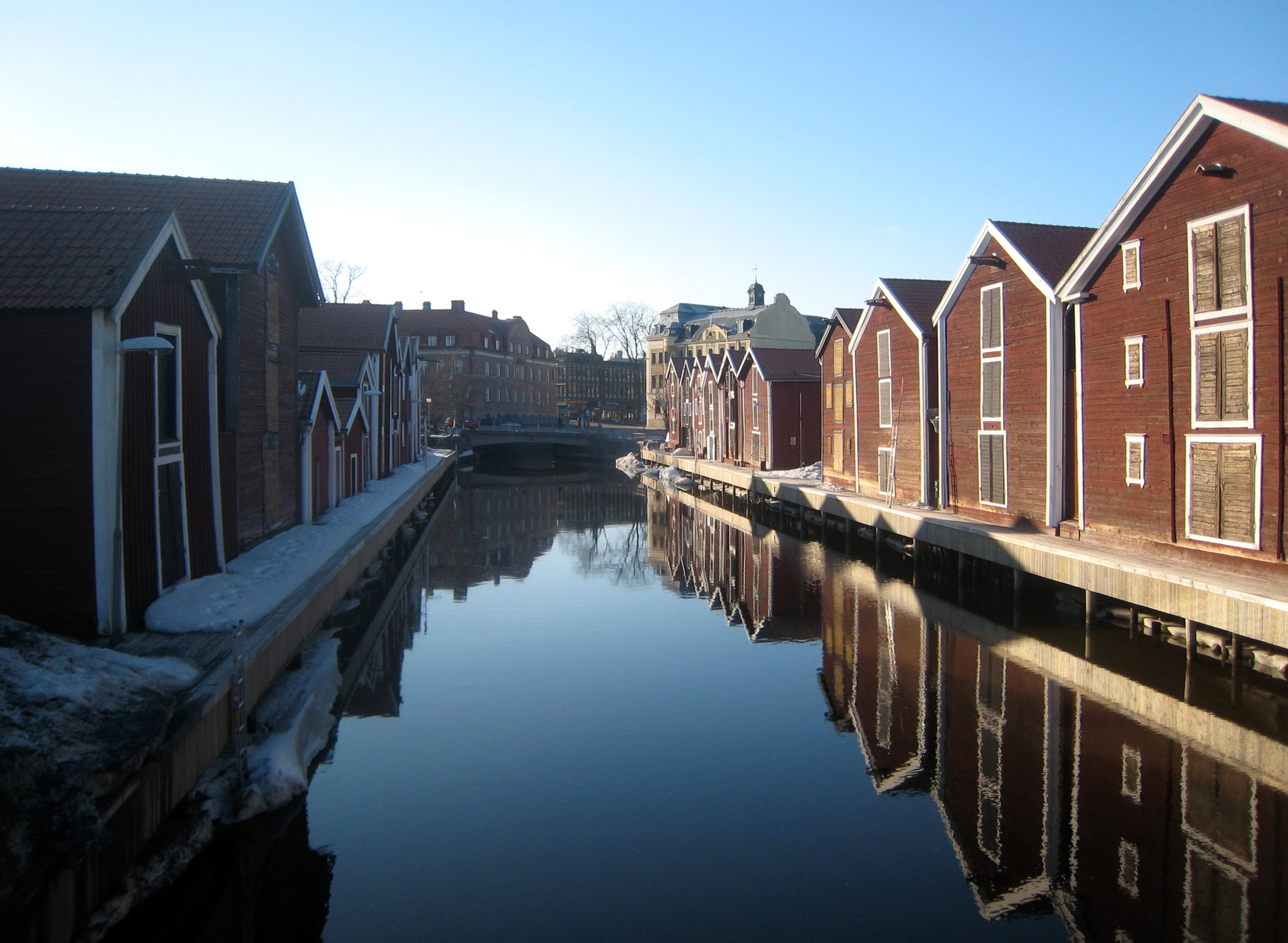
- Hudiksvall in 2010

- Location within Sweden Gävleborg Location within Sweden
- Coordinates: 61°44′N 17°07′E
- Country: Sweden
- Province: Hälsingland
- County: Gävleborg County
- Municipality: Hudiksvall Municipality

Area
  - Total: 14.2 km^{2} (5.5 sq mi)

Population (31 December 2023)
  - Total: 16,792
- Time zone: UTC+1 (CET)
  - Summer (DST): UTC+2 (CEST)
- Website: http://www.hudiksvall.se/

Hudiksvall (Swedish pronunciation: [hɵdɪksˈvalː]) is a city and the seat of Hudiksvall Municipality, in Hälsingland, Gävleborg County, Sweden with 16,792 inhabitants as of 2024. Hudiksvall is also known as Glada Hudik (English: Happy Hudik), a term that originated in the 19th century as word spread of its friendly hospitality and its lively social life. The city is located along the E4, on the east coast of Sweden deep inside the bay Hudiksvallsfjärden, about 80 km south of Sundsvall and about 130 km north of Gävle. Hudiksvall is one of Sweden's 80 largest urban area and also the largest urban area in Hälsingland. Around Hudiksvall within the municipality lay the communities of Delsbo, Iggesund, Enånger, Njutånger, Näsviken and Sörforsa.

== History ==
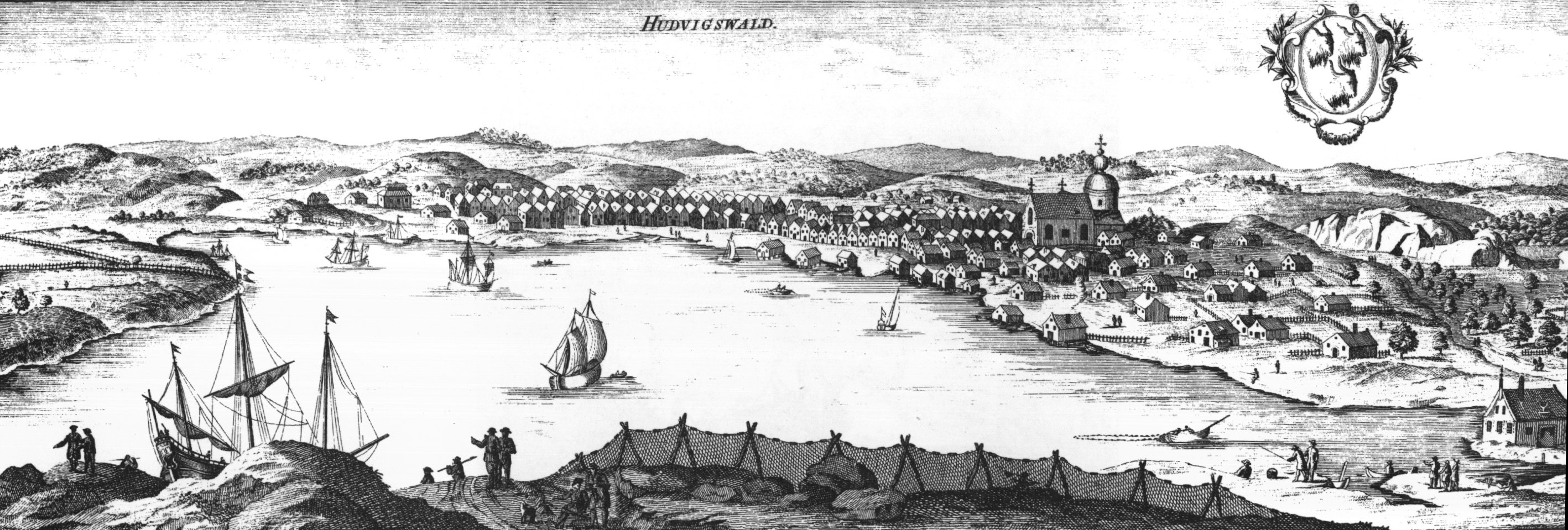
Hudiksvall around 1700, in Suecia antiqua et hodierna.

Hudiksvall was founded by King John III of Sweden in 1582. He had the inhabitants moved from the town Hudik, where his father Gustav Vasa had collected the trade- and craftsmen of Hälsingland in order to more easily collect taxes, to Hudiksvall by the shores of the bay.

At the time, fishing and the trading of furs, skins, iron, copper and wood products were the main sources of income, and the city flourished. But the city lost its privileges for foreign trading in 1636, and its development was somewhat stalled for the next two centuries.

It has been damaged by fires some 10 times, the most severe when it was burnt by the Russians during the Russian Pillage of 1719-1721 in 1721, whereafter only the church remained. The current street structure was applied in 1792 as part of the reconstruction necessitated by another fire.

== Climate ==
Hudiksvall has a humid continental climate with a significant maritime influence. In the 1961-1990 reference period it was just above subarctic, but that border region has since moved somewhat further north. Considering how far north it is, the climate is comparatively mild, with warm summers and moderated winters with daytime highs often hovering around the freezing point. The town is the northernmost in Sweden to have January average highs above −1 °C (30 °F) and is the coastal tipping point for regular average highs of 22 °C (72 °F) in summer. By east coast standards, Hudiksvall has a relatively wet climate with an annual precipitation rate averaging 646 millimetres (25.4 in) sometimes resulting in heavy snowfall during winters.

Climate data for Hudiksvall (2002–2021 averages); extremes since 1934
Month	Jan	Feb	Mar	Apr	May	Jun	Jul	Aug	Sep	Oct	Nov	Dec	Year
Record high °C (°F)	12.0 (53.6)	13.5 (56.3)	17.8 (64.0)	24.3 (75.7)	30.3 (86.5)	31.9 (89.4)	34.0 (93.2)	32.5 (90.5)	26.7 (80.1)	21.1 (70.0)	17.6 (63.7)	12.3 (54.1)	34.0 (93.2)
Mean maximum °C (°F)	6.0 (42.8)	8.1 (46.6)	13.8 (56.8)	18.7 (65.7)	23.4 (74.1)	27.2 (81.0)	28.8 (83.8)	27.4 (81.3)	22.9 (73.2)	16.4 (61.5)	11.2 (52.2)	6.9 (44.4)	29.8 (85.6)
Mean daily maximum °C (°F)	−0.8 (30.6)	0.5 (32.9)	5.0 (41.0)	10.3 (50.5)	14.9 (58.8)	19.6 (67.3)	22.5 (72.5)	21.0 (69.8)	16.5 (61.7)	9.7 (49.5)	4.1 (39.4)	1.0 (33.8)	10.4 (50.7)
Daily mean °C (°F)	−4.1 (24.6)	−3.3 (26.1)	0.5 (32.9)	4.9 (40.8)	9.5 (49.1)	14.2 (57.6)	17.3 (63.1)	16.0 (60.8)	11.7 (53.1)	5.8 (42.4)	1.2 (34.2)	−2.1 (28.2)	6.0 (42.7)
Mean daily minimum °C (°F)	−7.3 (18.9)	−7.0 (19.4)	−4.2 (24.4)	−0.6 (30.9)	4.1 (39.4)	8.7 (47.7)	12.1 (53.8)	11.0 (51.8)	6.9 (44.4)	1.8 (35.2)	−1.6 (29.1)	−5.0 (23.0)	1.6 (34.8)
Mean minimum °C (°F)	−18.4 (−1.1)	−18.7 (−1.7)	−13.7 (7.3)	−6.9 (19.6)	−2.7 (27.1)	2.8 (37.0)	6.0 (42.8)	4.4 (39.9)	−0.1 (31.8)	−5.8 (21.6)	−9.5 (14.9)	−14.9 (5.2)	−22.0 (−7.6)
Record low °C (°F)	−29.1 (−20.4)	−32.0 (−25.6)	−26.3 (−15.3)	−19.0 (−2.2)	−7.6 (18.3)	−1.4 (29.5)	1.9 (35.4)	0.6 (33.1)	−3.7 (25.3)	−13.5 (7.7)	−18.8 (−1.8)	−25.6 (−14.1)	−32.0 (−25.6)
Average precipitation mm (inches)	57.8 (2.28)	39.2 (1.54)	35.1 (1.38)	29.4 (1.16)	42.5 (1.67)	61.7 (2.43)	71.1 (2.80)	82.2 (3.24)	46.1 (1.81)	66.3 (2.61)	55.5 (2.19)	67.2 (2.65)	654.1 (25.76)
Average extreme snow depth cm (inches)	37 (15)	44 (17)	36 (14)	11 (4.3)	0 (0)	0 (0)	0 (0)	0 (0)	0 (0)	2 (0.8)	12 (4.7)	23 (9.1)	52 (20)
Source 1: SMHI Open Data
Source 2: SMHI climate data 2002–2021

== Sport ==
The city has three exercise trails on either side of the town: in the West, at Fridhem, in the North, just above the gymnasium, and in the East at Björkberg, of which the East has hosted the Svenska mästerskap (English: Swedish Championship) in cross country skiing a few times, most recently January 2005. In the western part of town there is also a ski slope, Hede, and in the North lies the trotting track Hagmyren.

The city center features a swimming pool with a gym, a solarium and an indoor sports hall. In 1939 Glysisvallen was built to include a soccer field, stadium, running track and outdoor hockey rink. In 1989 Hudiksvall received their first indoor hockey hall in the area, and in 2007 an artificial soccer field was built at Glysisvallen. In 1999, Hudiksvall also received a large modern indoor sports hall in the former sawmill located in the industrial area Håstaholmen.

In addition, Hudiksvall have the sports club Strands IF, the football club Hudiksvalls FF, the hockey club HHC and the floor hockey club Hudik/Björkberg. The most successful in recent years is the Hudiksvall sports club's ski section whose sprint skier Björn Lind won two Olympic gold medals in Turin in 2006. In the 2010 Winter Olympics in Vancouver Daniel Richardson won an Olympic gold medal in the team sprint. The 2010 Vasalopp was won by Jörgen Brink.

== Transport ==
The city is served by Hudiksvall Airport. However, there are no schedule flights to and from the airport. The nearest airport is Sundsvall–Timrå Airport which provides direct routes to Stockholm which are operated by Scandinavian Airlines. The airport is located 105 km (65 mi) north of Hudiksvall.

== Buildings and structures ==
Outside of Hudiksvall in Forsa socken, the Storbergsmasten is located. Storbergsmasten is a 335-metre-tall (1,099 ft) guyed mast for FM and TV transmission, which shares the first place as Sweden's tallest structure together with three other masts of same height.

- Läroverket, 1911 school
- Östra skolan (East School)

== Notable people ==
- Agneta Sjödin, presenter and TV-personality of Swedish channel TV4
- Brainbombs, noise rock band
- Gösta Skoglund, social democrat politician and educator
- Hans Vestberg, businessman, Chairman of the Swedish Handball Federation, Former CEO of Ericsson & Former President of the SOC
- Noomi Rapace, actress
- Jenny Sjödin, professional wrestler and submission grappler
- Tomas Brolin, footballer
- Vildhjarta, Progressive metal/Djent band
- Amy Gumenick, Swedish-American actress
- Svante Stockselius, journalist, television executive
- Peter Hedland, mariner, explorer, and pearler

== See also ==
- Sjösmyrsjön
