= Agön =

Island in Sweden

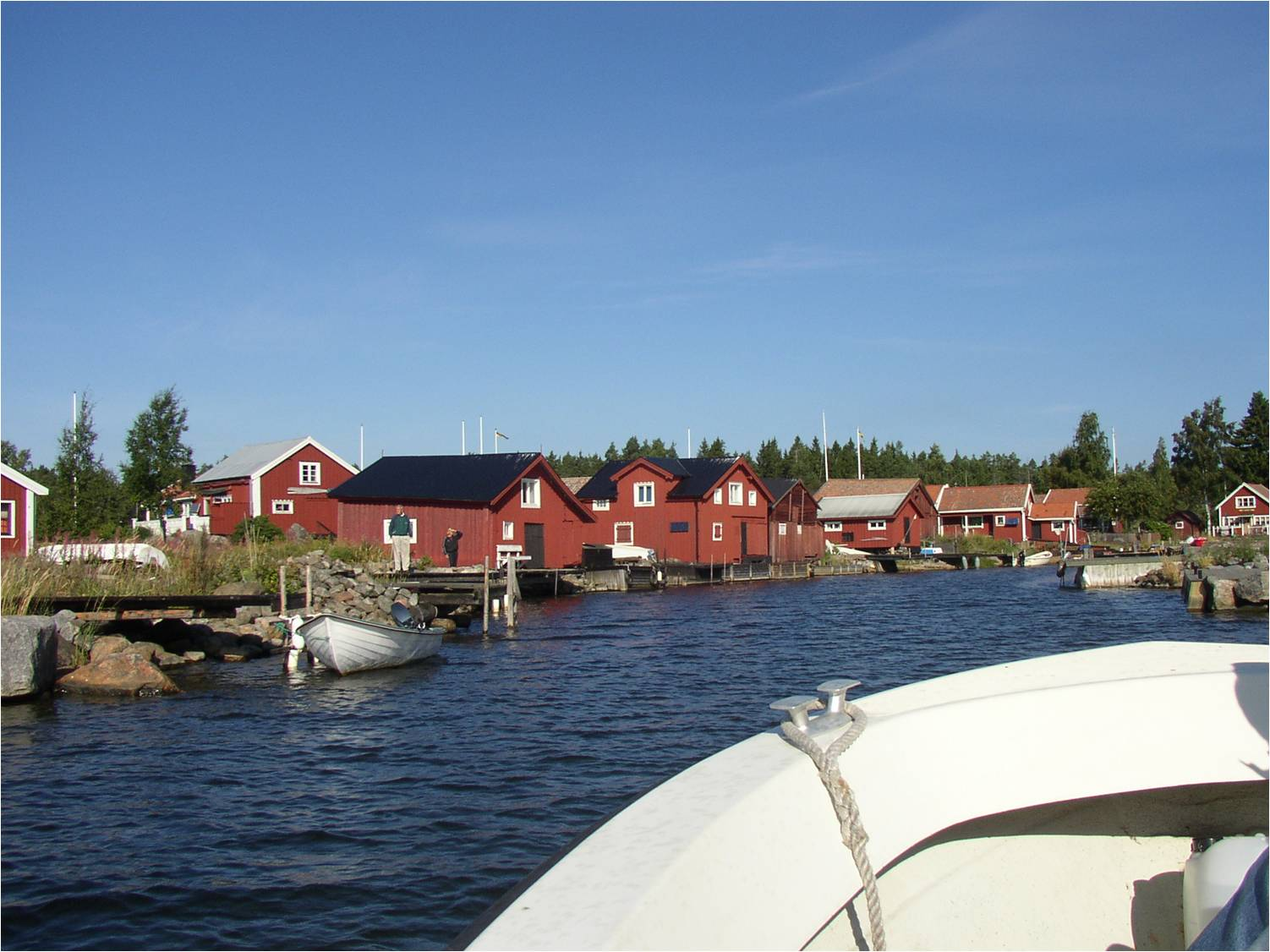
- The hamlet of Agö hamn

- Location within Sweden

Geography
- Location: Bothnian Sea
- Coordinates: 61°32′47″N 17°25′13″E
- Highest elevation: 20 m (70 ft)

Administration
- Sweden
- County: Gävleborg
- Municipality: Hudiksvall

Demographics
- Population: none

Additional information
- Time zone: CET (UTC+1)
  - Summer (DST): CEST (UTC+2)

Agön is an island in the Bothnian Sea approximately 30 kilometers southeast of Hudiksvall in Hälsingland. It is donated to the city of Hudiksvall.

On Agön there is a timber chapel, Agö chapel, which dates from 1660. The island used to have an important fishing village in Agö harbor on the south side of the island, Agö hamn. The Agö lighthouse at the far end of the east was staffed until 1973.

Agön and the islands to the west of the island, Drakön and Kråkön, belong to Hudiksvall's district and are part of the Agön-Kråkön nature reserve. The whole of the archipelago is mostly covered with mixed coniferous forest, and is home to moose, hares, and grouse.
