= Sigtuna Cricket Club =

Cricket club in Märsta, Sweden

Sigtuna Cricket Club was founded in 1989 and is based in Valsta near Stockholm in Sweden. Their home ground is situated between Arenberga and Norrbacka, a short bus ride from Märsta railway station. The club are currently members of the Swedish Cricket Federation.

Sigtuna CC competes in the Swedish National Cricket League and won the league in 1994. Since then, the team has reached the Semi-Final twice; 2007 and 2010. In 2007 they were beaten by Pakistan CC, with Pakistan CC going on to win the final. In 2010 they were beaten by Nacka CC. In 2011 the team reached the Final, but were beaten by Uppsala CC.

In July 2011 the team won the T20 tournament hosted by Stockholm International Cricket Club.
