= Swedish Hockey Association =

Swedish Hockey Association Svenska Landhockeyförbundet
- Sport: Hockey
- Abbreviation: SLHF
- Founded: 1975
- Affiliation: International Hockey Federation
- Regional affiliation: European Hockey Federation
- Closure date: 2022
- (Sweden)

The Swedish Hockey Association (Swedish: Svenska Landhockeyförbundet, SLHF) was the national hockey association in Sweden. In 2022 it merged with the Swedish American Football Association (Swedish: Sveriges Amerikanska Fotbollsförbund, SAFF) to form SWE3 - The Swedish association for American Football, Flag Football, and Hockey.

The Swedish Hockey Association was founded in 1975 as interest in field hockey in Sweden increased substantially following the 1972 Summer Olympics in Munich. The SLHF became a member of the Swedish Sports Confederation (Swedish: Riksidrottsförbundet, RF) in 1977 and was a member of the Swedish Olympic Committee (Swedish: Sveriges Olympiska Kommitté, SOK), the European Hockey Federation (EHF) and International Hockey Federation (FIH). Its headquarters used to be in Stockholm.
