= Swedish Olympic Committee =

- Country: Sweden
- Code: SWE
- Created: 27 April 1913
- Recognized: 1913
- Continental Association: EOC
- Headquarters: Stockholm, Sweden
- President: Hans von Uthmann
- Secretary General: Åsa Edlund Jönsson
- Website: www.sok.se

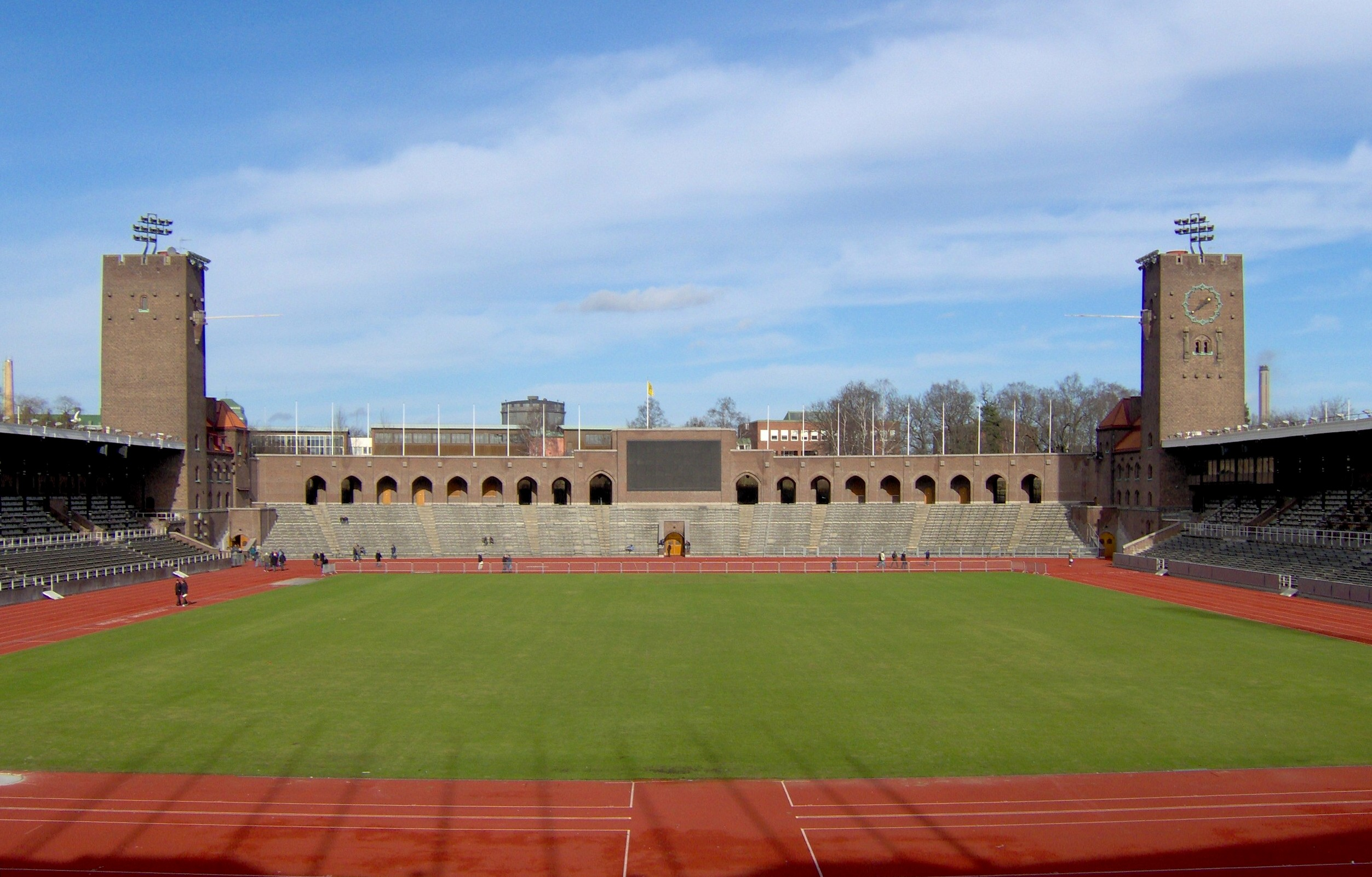
The Swedish Olympic Committee has its offices in one of the towers of the Stockholm Olympic Stadium, the main arena of the 1912 Summer Olympics.

The Swedish Olympic Committee (SOC; Swedish: Sveriges Olympiska Kommitté, SOK; IOC Code: SWE) is the Swedish National Olympic Committee (NOC). The Swedish Olympic Committee organize the Swedish participation in the Olympics, choose the participants and run a support program for Swedish elite athletes called "Topp och Talang".

Members of the committee are 38 sports federations, which elect the Executive Council composed of the president and eight members. The Athletes Committee has one representative and swedish IOC members also have an automatic chair.

== History ==
The Swedish Olympic Committee was founded on 27 April 1913 and recognized by the International Olympic Committee the same year.

== Presidents ==
The Swedish Olympic Committee has had the following presidents:

President	Term
Crown Prince Gustaf Adolf	1913–1933
Prince Gustaf Adolf	1933–1947
Prince Bertil	1947–1997
Carl Gustav Anderberg	1997–2000
Stefan Lindeberg	2000–2016
Hans Vestberg	2016–2018
Mats Årjes	2018–2023
Hans von Uthmann	2023–present

== Notable members ==
Name	Comments	Year
Viktor Balck	Original member	1894–1921
Sigfrid Edström	Former President	1942–1952
Gunilla Lindberg	Vice President	2001–2013

== Executive committee ==
The committee of the SOC is represented by:

- President: Hans von Uthmann
- Vice Presidents: Anders Larsson, Malin Eggertz Forsmark
- Secretary General: Åsa Edlund Jönsson
- IOC members: Gunilla Lindberg, Frida Hansdotter
- Athletes representative: Anna Laurell Nash
- Members: Carina Olsson, Eva-Lena Karlsson, Olle Dahlin, Fredrik Rapp, Petra Sörling, Stefan Rahm

== Member federations ==
The Swedish National Federations are the organizations that coordinate all aspects of their individual sports. They are responsible for training, competition and development of their sports. There are currently 38 Olympic Summer and seven Winter Sport Federations and the 17 Non-Olympic Sport federations in Sweden.

=== Olympic Sport federations ===
National Federation	Summer or Winter	Headquarters
Swedish Archery Association	Summer	Sörberge
Swedish Athletics Association	Summer	Solna
Swedish Badminton Federation	Summer	Stockholm
Swedish Baseball and Softball Federation	Summer	Stockholm
Swedish Basketball Federation	Summer	Stockholm
Swedish Biathlon Federation	Winter	Östersund
Swedish Bobsleigh and Luge Federation	Winter	Skellefteå
Swedish Boxing Federation	Summer	Stockholm
Swedish Canoe Federation	Summer	Ursviken
Swedish Climbing Federation	Summer	Stockholm
Swedish Curling Federation	Winter	Danderyd
Swedish Cycling Federation	Summer	Stockholm
Swedish Equestrian Federation	Summer	Stockholm
Swedish Fencing Federation	Summer	Stockholm
Swedish Figure Skating Federation	Winter	Stockholm
Swedish Football Federation	Summer	Solna
Swedish Golf Federation	Summer	Stockholm
Swedish Gymnastics Federation	Summer	Stockholm
Swedish Handball Federation	Summer	Stockholm
Swedish Hockey Federation	Summer	Gothenburg
Swedish Ice Hockey Association	Winter	Johanneshov
Swedish Judo Federation	Summer	Uppsala
Swedish Karate Federation	Summer	Johanneshov
Swedish Pentathlon Federation	Summer	Stockholm
Swedish Rowing Federation	Summer	Stockholm
Swedish Rugby Union	Summer	Norrköping
Swedish Sailing Federation	Summer	Stockholm
Swedish Shooting Sport Federation	Summer	Stockholm
Swedish Skating Association	Winter	Stockholm
Swedish Ski Association	Winter	Falun
Swedish Swimming Federation	Summer	Stockholm
Swedish Table Tennis Federation	Summer	Köping
Swedish Taekwondo Federation	Summer	Stockholm
Swedish Tennis Federation	Summer	Stockholm
Swedish Triathlon Federation	Summer	Gothenburg
Swedish Volleyball Federation	Summer	Stockholm
Swedish Weightlifting Federation	Summer	Örebro
Swedish Wrestling Federation	Summer	Stockholm

=== Non-Olympic Sport federations ===
National Federation	Headquarters
Swedish Air Sports Federation	Bromma
Swedish American Football Federation	Stockholm
Swedish Bandy Federation	Stockholm
Swedish Boule Federation	Stockholm
Albanian Bowling Federation	Stockholm
Swedish Budo and Martial Arts Federation	Stockholm
Swedish Chess Federation	Uppsala
Swedish Cricket Federation	Stockholm
Swedish Dancesport Federation	Stockholm
Swedish Floorball Federation	Solna
Swedish Frisbee Federation	Gothenburg
Swedish Orienteering Federation	Stockholm
Swedish Parasports Federation	Stockholm
Swedish Sportsdiving Federation	Stockholm
Swedish Squash Federation	Malmö
Swedish Walking Association	Gothenburg
Swedish Waterski and Wakeboard Federation	Halmstad

== See also ==
- Sweden at the Olympics
