= Maln =

- Location within Sweden Gävleborg Location within Sweden
- Coordinates: 61°43′16″N 17°10′15″E
- Country: Sweden
- Province: Hälsingland
- County: Gävleborg County
- Municipality: Hudiksvall Municipality

Area
  - Total: 0.35 km^{2} (0.14 sq mi)

Population (31 December 2010)
  - Total: 213
  - Density: 612/km^{2} (1,590/sq mi)
- Time zone: UTC+1 (CET)
  - Summer (DST): UTC+2 (CEST)

Maln (or Malnbaden) is a locality situated in Hudiksvall Municipality, Gävleborg County, Sweden with 213 inhabitants in 2010.
