= Hålsjö =

- Location within Sweden Gävleborg Location within Sweden
- Coordinates: 61°50′N 16°45′E
- Country: Sweden
- Province: Hälsingland
- County: Gävleborg County
- Municipality: Hudiksvall Municipality

Area
  - Total: 0.85 km^{2} (0.33 sq mi)

Population (31 December 2010)
  - Total: 214
  - Density: 252/km^{2} (650/sq mi)
- Time zone: UTC+1 (CET)
  - Summer (DST): UTC+2 (CEST)

Hålsjö is a locality situated in Hudiksvall Municipality, Gävleborg County, Sweden with 214 inhabitants in 2010.
