= Carl Eric Stålberg =

Swedish businessman

- Born: 15 January 1951 (age 75)
- Occupations: businessman, sports maanger

Carl Eric Stålberg, born 15 January 1951, is a Swedish businessman and the current Chairman of Swedbank. He graduated with a degree in business and economics. He entered the Board of the bank in 2001 and became its chairman in 2003. He also serves on the board of the Norwegian savings bank Sparebank 1.

Apart from his involvement in business, he was also the President of the Swedish Skiing Federation between 1996–2008 and Vice President of the International Ski Federation. Stålberg is also a member of the Swedish Olympic Committee.

He is also the chairman of Sweden-Japan Foundation.
