= Näsvikens IK =

Swedish football club

- Full name: Näsvikens Idrottsklubb
- Founded: 1950
- Ground: Tunet; Näsviken; Sweden
- Chairman: Lars-Göran Andersson
- League: Division 4 Hälsingland
Home colours	Away colours

Näsvikens IK is a Swedish football club located in Näsviken in Hudiksvall Municipality, mostly famous for fostering forward Tomas Brolin.

== Background ==
Näsvikens IK currently plays in Division 4 Hälsingland which is the sixth tier of Swedish football. They play their home matches at the Tunet in Näsviken.

The club is affiliated to Hälsinglands Fotbollförbund.
