= Stockholm Cricket Club =

Stockholm CC
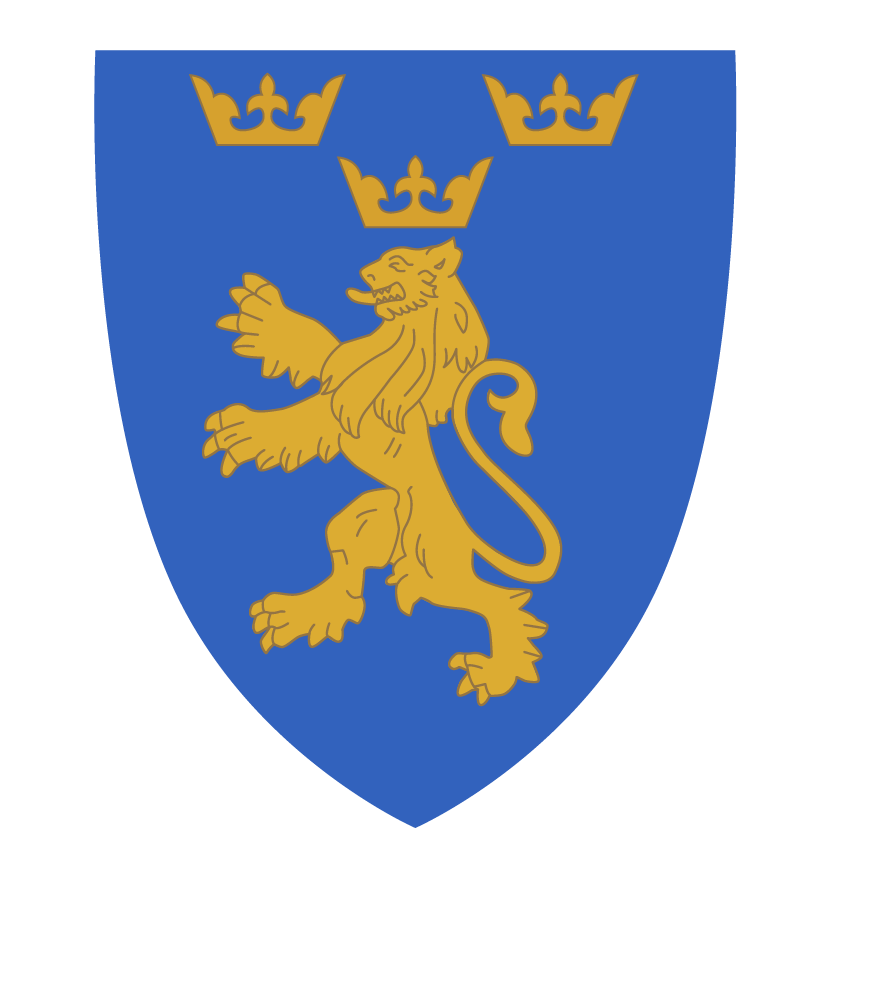

Personnel
- Captain: Santhosh Yadapalli
- Chairman: Karl Langston

Team information
- Colours: Club: One Day and T20:
- Founded: 1948
- Home ground: Skarpnäck Sportsfält, Stockholm

History
- SM One-Day wins: 0
- SM T20 wins: 0
- Official website: Official website
Club
One-Day & T20

Stockholm Cricket Club (Stockholm CC) is the oldest cricket club in Sweden and is based in Stockholm, Sweden. Formed by staff from various British and Commonwealth embassies in 1948, matches were initially played against visiting navy ships and tours to the continent then later to local opposition as cricket in Sweden grew. The club is a member of the Swedish Cricket Federation.

== History ==
=== 1940s to 1970s ===
The club was founded in 1948 by Embassy Staff from cricket playing nations in Stockholm, with the British Embassy taking a key role in the organisation. During the post war period matches were played against visiting navy ships and against embassy teams. During the 1960s the club made regular trips to the continent to play against teams in the Netherlands, Denmark and Germany. With the formation of the Helsinki Cricket Club a yearly tour to Finland was a standing fixture for the club. During the 1970s with the influx of refugees to Sweden, particularly from Uganda, the number of clubs and opposition to arrange regular fixtures grew. To celebrate the 25th anniversary of the club in 1973 a two-day match was played at Östermalms IP against Lund Cricket Club.

=== 1980s to 2016 ===
During the 1980s the club continued playing with a fixture list against the growing number of clubs in Sweden and the international tours. The played the majority of matches at Årstafältet. After the formation of the Swedish Cricket Federation in 1990 the club participated in the inaugural season run by the newly formed governing body then withdrew preferring to play friendly matches against other teams.

=== 2016 to Present ===
In 2016 the BCA and KTH Cricket Clubs merged with the Stockholm CC, youth development being the key focus of the combined club. In 2017 the "new" club participated in the Swedish Cricket Federations One Day and T20 competitions for men. The Stockholm CC youth development program started in 2016. The club is leading the growth in junior cricket in the Stockholm region where it organises competitions for children and young adults, U13 Poolspel and U15 Cricket Festival.

== Branding ==
The club's colours are yellow and blue. The Stockholm CC badge being three golden crowns above a gold rampant lion on a blue field.

== Grounds ==
The Stockholm CC played their first matches in Rålambshovsparken, Stockholm. Soon the authorities realised the danger a cricket ball posed to sunbathers and a ground was found at Skarpnäcks flyggfält. In 1960 the club moved to Flatenbadet, Nacka. In the 1980s the club had a ground at Årstafältet. Since 2016 the club has played at Skarpnäck sportsfält, Granby BP, Gärdet - cricket grounds managed by Stockholm City Council.
