= Sjösmyrsjön =

Lake in Hudiksvall Municipality, Sweden

- Location within Sweden Gävleborg Location within Sweden
- Location: Gävleborg County, Sweden
- Coordinates: 61.894808°N 16.45503°E
- Basin countries: Sweden
- Settlements: Tomsjö

Sjösmyrsjön (english: "Lake Swamp Lake") is a minor lake located in Hudiksvall Municipality, Gävleborgs Län, Sweden. The spelling has been debated, invalid variants like "Sjömyrasjön" have often been suggested, but the above presented spelling has gained more recognition lately.
