= Läroverket (Hudiksvall) =

School in central Hudiksvall, Sweden

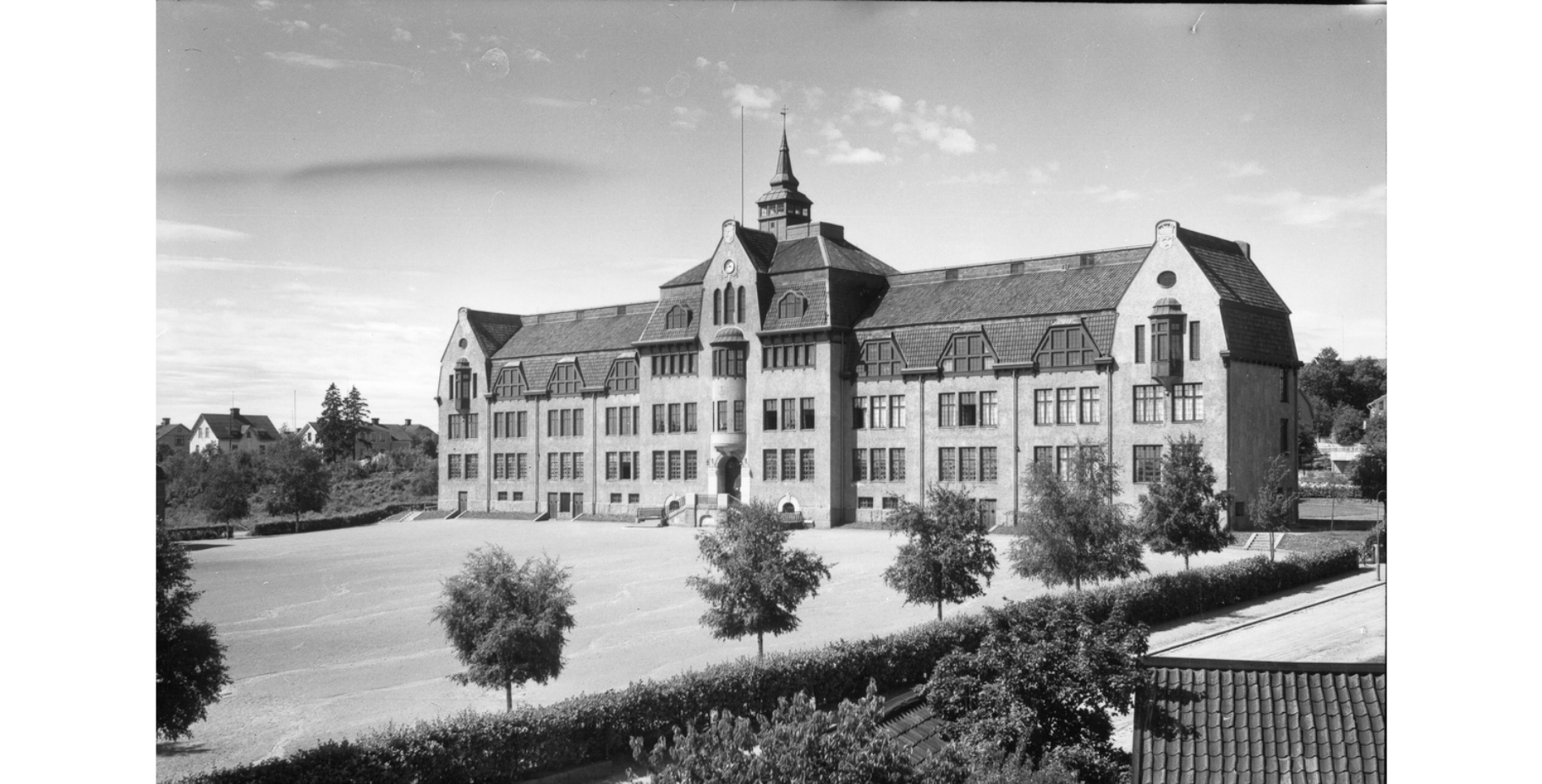
The school building in 1936.

Läroverket is a school in central Hudiksvall, Sweden. It is the part of Västra skolan responsible for teaching Swedish grade 7–9, for pupils between the ages of 13 and 15 years.

The current school building was completed in 1911. The project had been delayed after Fryklund, the construction company initially contracted, suffered bankruptcy in 1910. The name Läroverket has a long history in Hudiksvall, and was used for various educational institutions since the middle 17th century.
