= Friggesund =

- Location within Sweden Gävleborg Location within Sweden
- Coordinates: 61°54′N 16°32′E
- Country: Sweden
- Province: Hälsingland
- County: Gävleborg County
- Municipality: Hudiksvall Municipality

Area
  - Total: 0.82 km^{2} (0.32 sq mi)

Population (31 December 2010)
  - Total: 522
  - Density: 639/km^{2} (1,660/sq mi)
- Time zone: UTC+1 (CET)
  - Summer (DST): UTC+2 (CEST)

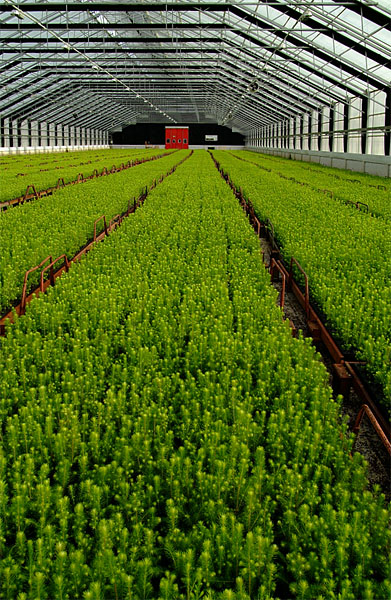
A tree nursery, close to Friggesund, Sweden. Yearly around 13-14 million trees are grown from seeds here.

Friggesund is a locality situated in Hudiksvall Municipality, Gävleborg County, Sweden with 522 inhabitants in 2010.
