= Hamrafjället Nature Reserve =

Nature reserve in Sweden

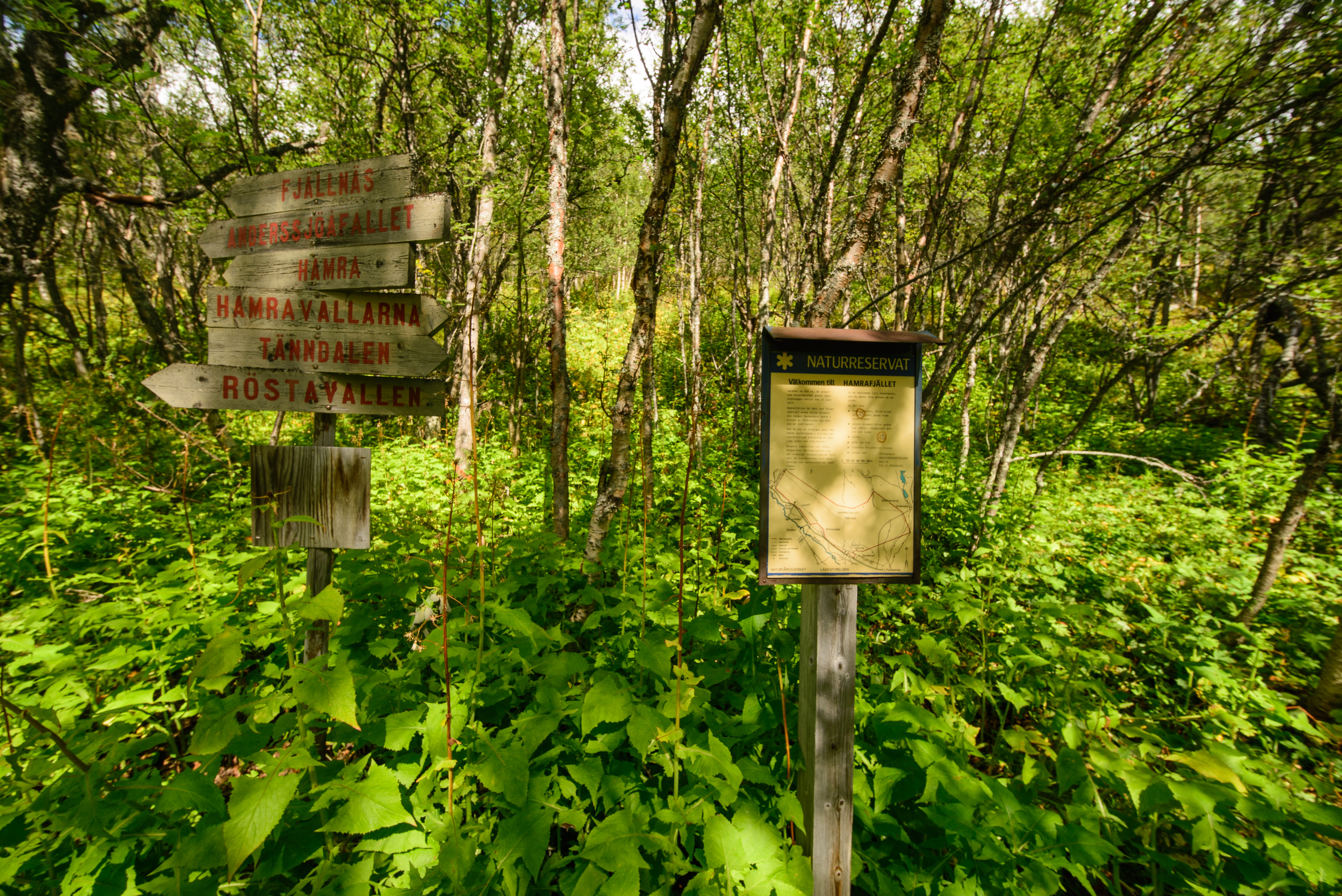
- Entrance to the nature reserve

- Location within Jämtland Location within Sweden
- Location: Sweden
- Nearest city: Östersund
- Coordinates: 62°33′58″N 12°16′56″E
- Area: 676 hectares (1,670 acres)
- Established: 1974

Hamrafjället Nature Reserve (Swedish: Hamrafjällets naturreservat) is a nature reserve encompassing parts of the fell Hamrafjället in Jämtland County in western Sweden. It is part of the EU-wide Natura 2000-network.

== Description and history ==
The nature reserve consists of three main areas: the highest part is bare mountain, a lower part is dominated by the treeline, formed by arctic downy birch, and old pastures and meadows, and thirdly a wetland area. Parts of the mountain slope are very steep and form important nesting grounds for some species of birds; the access to these areas is restricted during the summer. The flora in parts of the nature reserve is exceptionally rich for this part of the country, partially because it is a location where northern species overlap with the habitat of more southern species. Over 400 species of vascular plants grow here. Typical plants include fragrant orchid, Lapland marsh-orchid and alpine sow-thistle. Red-listed or unusual species found in the reserve include the small white orchid, the moss Bryum blindii, and the fungus Bovista paludosa. The fauna is also diverse, and golden eagle, great snipe, Eurasian lynx and wolverine have all been observed in the nature reserve.

The area has been influenced by human interaction for a long time. It contains seven grave sites from c. 800–1050 CE. Its traditional use as pasture may go back as far as a thousand years. Although it ceased to be used as grazing ground in 1971, the old pastures were restored in 2003–2008 within the framework of the EU-funded LIFE Programme.
