= Sörforsa =

- Location within Sweden Gävleborg Location within Sweden
- Coordinates: 61°44′N 16°59′E
- Country: Sweden
- Province: Hälsingland
- County: Gävleborg County
- Municipality: Hudiksvall Municipality

Area
  - Total: 2.06 km^{2} (0.80 sq mi)

Population (31 December 2010)
  - Total: 1,574
  - Density: 765/km^{2} (1,980/sq mi)
- Time zone: UTC+1 (CET)
  - Summer (DST): UTC+2 (CEST)

Sörforsa is a locality situated in Hudiksvall Municipality, Gävleborg County, Sweden with 1,574 inhabitants in 2010.

== Culture ==
Historically, there has been a little settlement of Catholics in the surroundings, due to Walloon immigration a couple of centuries ago. Its main treasure is the Chapel dedicated to the Sacred Heart of Jesus, that was inaugurated in 1909.

== History ==
Sörforsa is located in the historical landskap of Hälsingland, which together with Gästrikland form Gävleborgs Län (county). It also lies in the historical socken (parish) of Forsa which merged in recent years with Hög parish to form Forsa-Hög församling (assembly). In 1898 the Holma-Helsinglands Linspinneri och Väfveri AB opened in Sörforsa. This was a flax spinning factory to take advantage of the abundant flax (lin) production in the region. The spun thread then went to weavers in other parts of the country.
