= Filbornaskolan =

School in Helsingborg, Sweden

Coordinates: 56.05550°N 12.73173°E

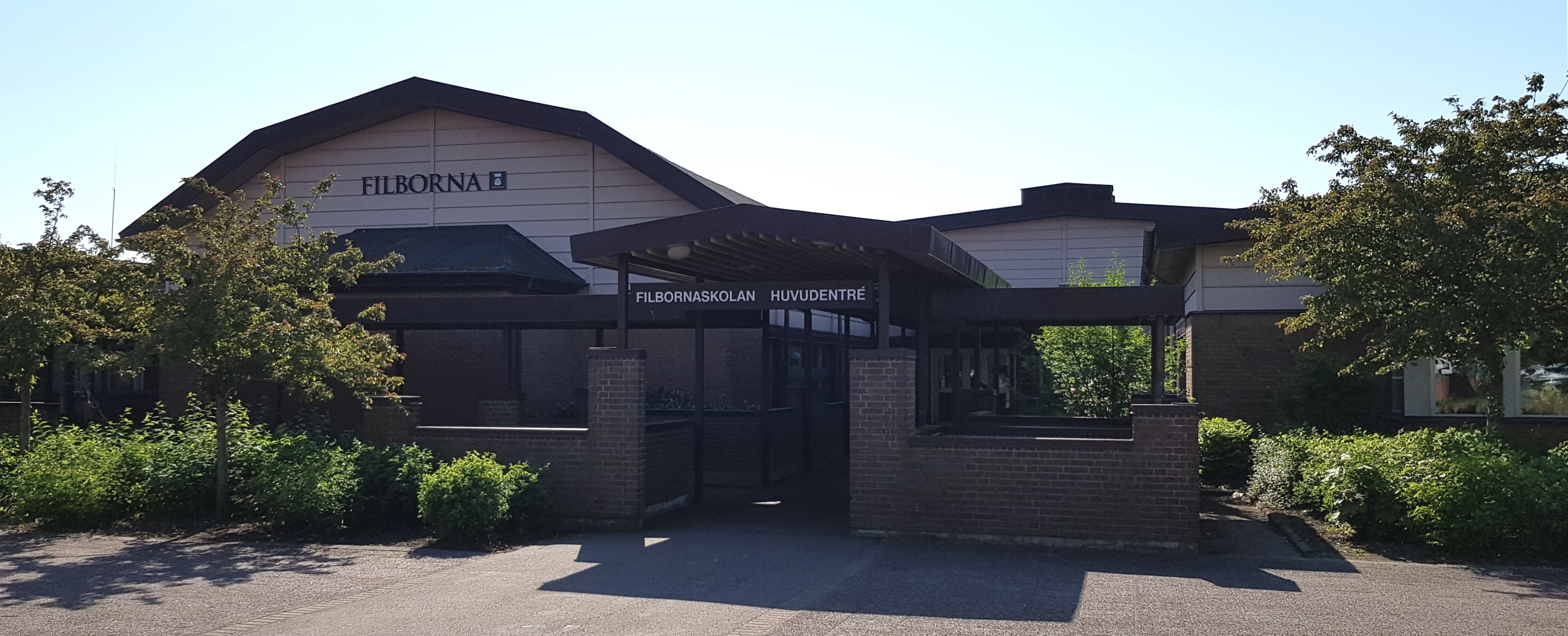
Filbornaskolan in Helsingborg.

Filbornaskolan is a school located in the outskirts of Helsingborg in Sweden. The school hosts several programmes, with a focus on sports. Notable former alumni include Henrik Larsson, Linn Grant, Maja Stark and Ludvig Åberg.
