= Swedish Cricket Federation =

Cricket governing body in Sweden

Cricket Sweden
- Svenska Cricketförbundet
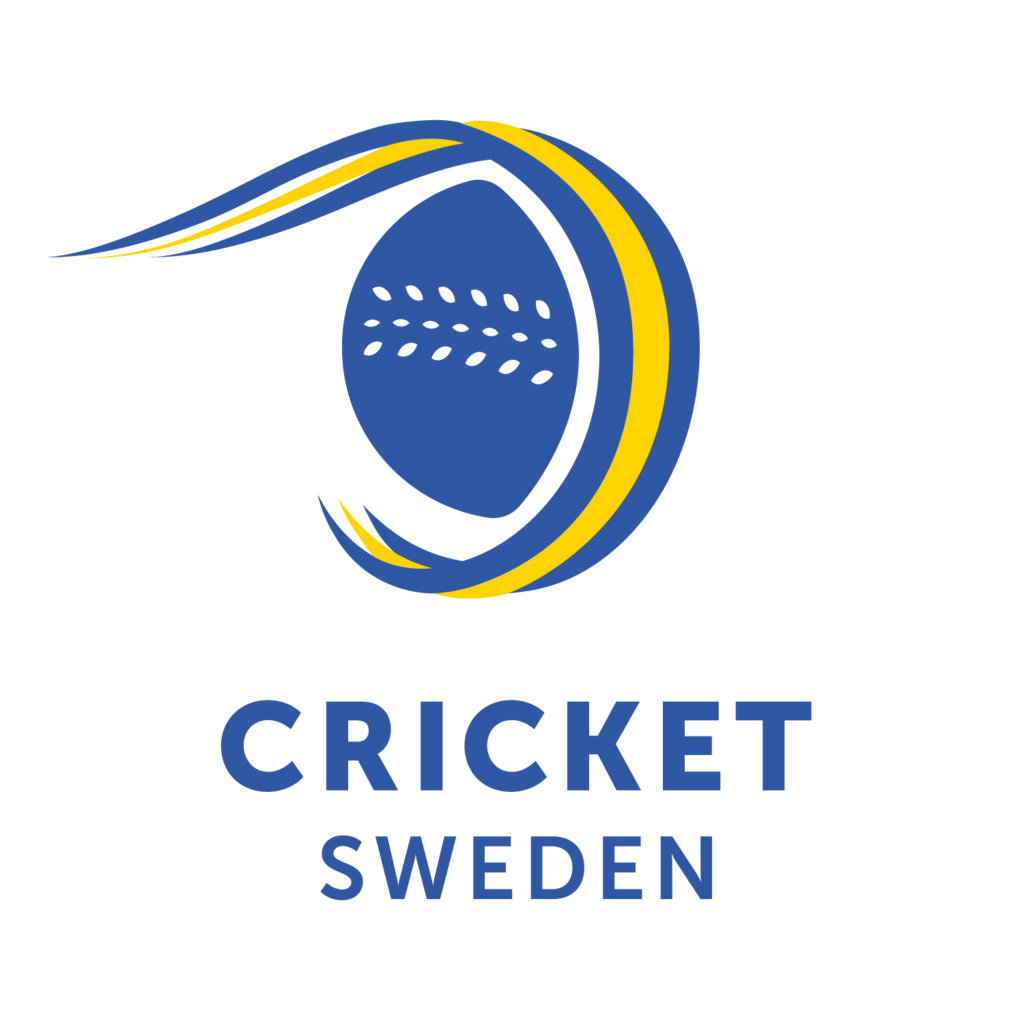
- Formation: 1990
- Type: Sports governing body
- Headquarters: Stockholm
- Location: Sweden
- Official language: Swedish
- Website: www.cricket.se

Cricket Sweden (Swedish: Svenska Cricketförbundet) was established in 1990, and is the administrative organisation for all cricket in Sweden. The Swedish Cricket Federation is an associate member of the International Cricket Council. In 1998, there were approx. 500 registered cricket players in Sweden. In 2016 Radio Sweden reported there was an estimated 55 teams and 3,000 registered players; the surge, similar to that in Germany, has been attributed to an influx of immigrants from Afghanistan and other cricket-loving countries. The social side of the game has been praised for its ability to integrate new arrivals. In 2015 the Swedish Cricket Federation joined the Swedish Sports Confederation. While gaining in popularity, it is said that the game still lags behind cricket in Norway in popularity.

== History ==
In 1883 the first cricket club, Lyckans Samfund, was founded in Gothenburg by cricket enthusiasts. The oldest cricket club founded in modern times in Sweden is the Stockholm Cricket Club.

Development of cricket was slow during the 1950s and 1960s, with players predominantly being expats. Since the 1970s growth of cricket in Sweden has been tied to waves of immigration and refugees settling in Sweden, with Ugandan Indians, Sri Lankan, Bangladeshi, Pakistani, most recently Afghani immigrants driving the increase in playing numbers.

The Swedish Cricket Federation was formed in 1990. In 1991 the Swedish Cricket Federation joined the ICC and was made an affiliate member in 1997. The Swedish Cricket Federation was accepted as the 71st member of the Swedish Sports Confederation (Swedish: Riks Idrottsförbundet) in 2015.

== National team ==
The Sweden national cricket teams represent the Kingdom of Sweden in international cricket. Sweden is represented by teams for Men, Women and U19.

== Club Cricket ==
There are 70 cricket clubs in Sweden affiliated to the Swedish Cricket Federation. Currently 56 play in the Cricket Ligan - the national club cricket competition in Sweden for One Day, T20 and T10 formats. Cricket Ligan's highest division is the Allsvenskan, under which are 2 levels of regional competitions. The winner of the Swedish T10 competition is eligible to represent Sweden in the European Cricket League.
