= Näsviken, Hudiksvall Municipality =

Näsviken
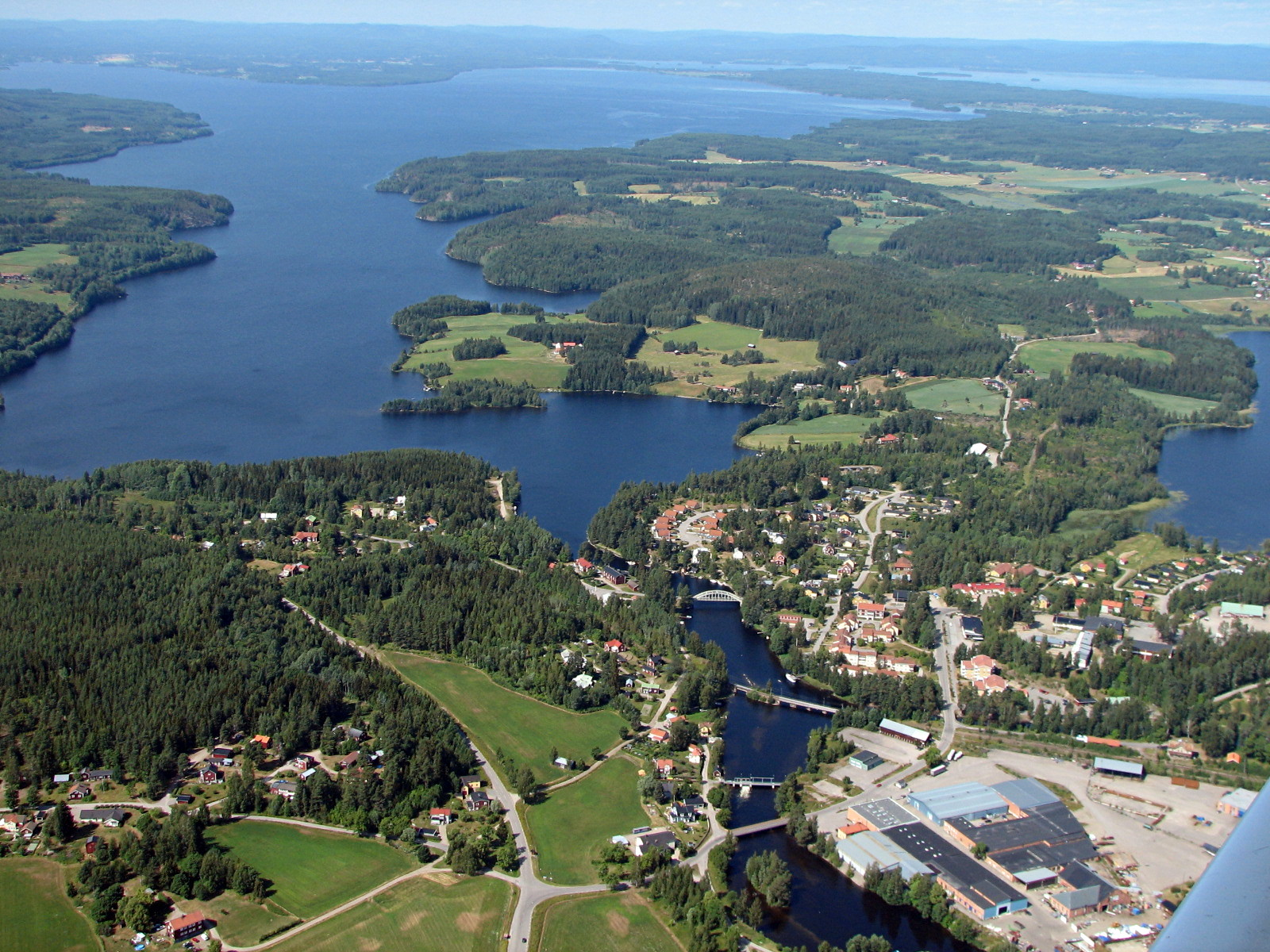
- July 2006 aerial view

- Location within Sweden Gävleborg Location within Sweden
- Coordinates: 61°46′N 16°52′E
- Country: Sweden
- Province: Hälsingland
- County: Gävleborg County
- Municipality: Hudiksvall Municipality

Area
  - Total: 1.83 km^{2} (0.71 sq mi)

Population (31 December 2010)
  - Total: 924
  - Density: 506/km^{2} (1,310/sq mi)
- Time zone: UTC+1 (CET)
  - Summer (DST): UTC+2 (CEST)

Näsviken is a locality situated in Hudiksvall Municipality, Gävleborg County, Sweden with 924 inhabitants in 2010.

== Sports ==
The following sports clubs are located in Näsviken:

- Näsvikens IK
