= Cricket in Norway =

Cricket in Norway represents cricket's most northern stations. The game has a solid and developing situation in the country, but most players of the sport are from or descended from South Asia, and the player base among Norwegians is low.

The Norwegian Cricket Board became an affiliate member of the International Cricket Council (ICC) in 2000, and the Norway national cricket team played its first international match later that year. Most of the side's matches have been against members of the European Cricket Council (ECC), although in more recent years Norway has fielded sides in the lower divisions of the World Cricket League (WCL). The team's current head coach is Muhammad Haroon, a former first-class player in Pakistan, who was appointed in early 2014. In September 2018, Norway qualified from Group C of the 2018–19 ICC World Twenty20 Europe Qualifier

== History ==
The first cricket match in Norway was played in 1866, and the Norwegian-born cricketer Buster Nupen played for the South Africa national cricket team from 1922 to 1936. Regardless of endeavours to develop the game at the time in Norway, cricket had all but vanished by the turn of the century.

During the 1970s, cricket experienced a revival in Norway as South Asian migrant workers began playing matches in and around Oslo. Subsequently, the first Norwegian cricket club was established in 1974. The Norwegian Cricket Board was founded in 1994 and, in June 2000, joined the International Cricket Council (ICC). In May 2007, the Norwegian Cricket Federation joined the Norwegian Olympic and Paralympic Committee and Confederation of Sports.

Today, there are 67 cricket clubs in Norway with 5,000 members combined. There are six divisions for men and one division for women.
