= Swedish Floorball Federation =

Floorball governing body in Sweden

- Svenska innebandyförbundet
- Formation: 7 November 1981
- Founded at: Sala, Sweden
- Type: sports governing body
- Headquarters: Solna
- Location: Sweden
- Official language: Swedish

The Swedish Floorball Federation (Swedish: Svenska innebandyförbundet) is the governing body of floorball in Sweden. It was founded in Sala, Sweden 7 November 1981 and held its first annual meeting, where all 15 clubs were represented, 20 March 1982. From the season of 1983/84 the Swedish Floorball Federation became a section of the Swedish Hockey Association. After this, the interest for floorball in Sweden grew and many new clubs were founded. In 1984 there already were over 100 floorball clubs in Sweden. The 22 November 1985 the Swedish Floorball Federation was accepted as an independent association into the Swedish Sports Confederation (Swedish: Riksidrottsförbundet). It also was the first sport to get chosen in on the first application. The head office of the Swedish Floorball Federation is located in Solna (a municipality in Stockholm County).

Because of the membership in the Swedish sports confederation the development of the sport went faster. A nationwide league launched and the numbers of registered players exploded. 1990 the number of clubs passed 1,000 and had over 25,000 registered players. 1996 the historic first Floorball World Championships were played in Sweden and 15,106 people saw Sweden defeat Finland with 5–0 in Globen, Stockholm. Today there are around 120,000 registered players in Sweden

During the Swedish Floorball Federation's General Assembly in Bromma on 16 June 2019, Märit Bergendahl was elected its first female president.
