= Teknikum =

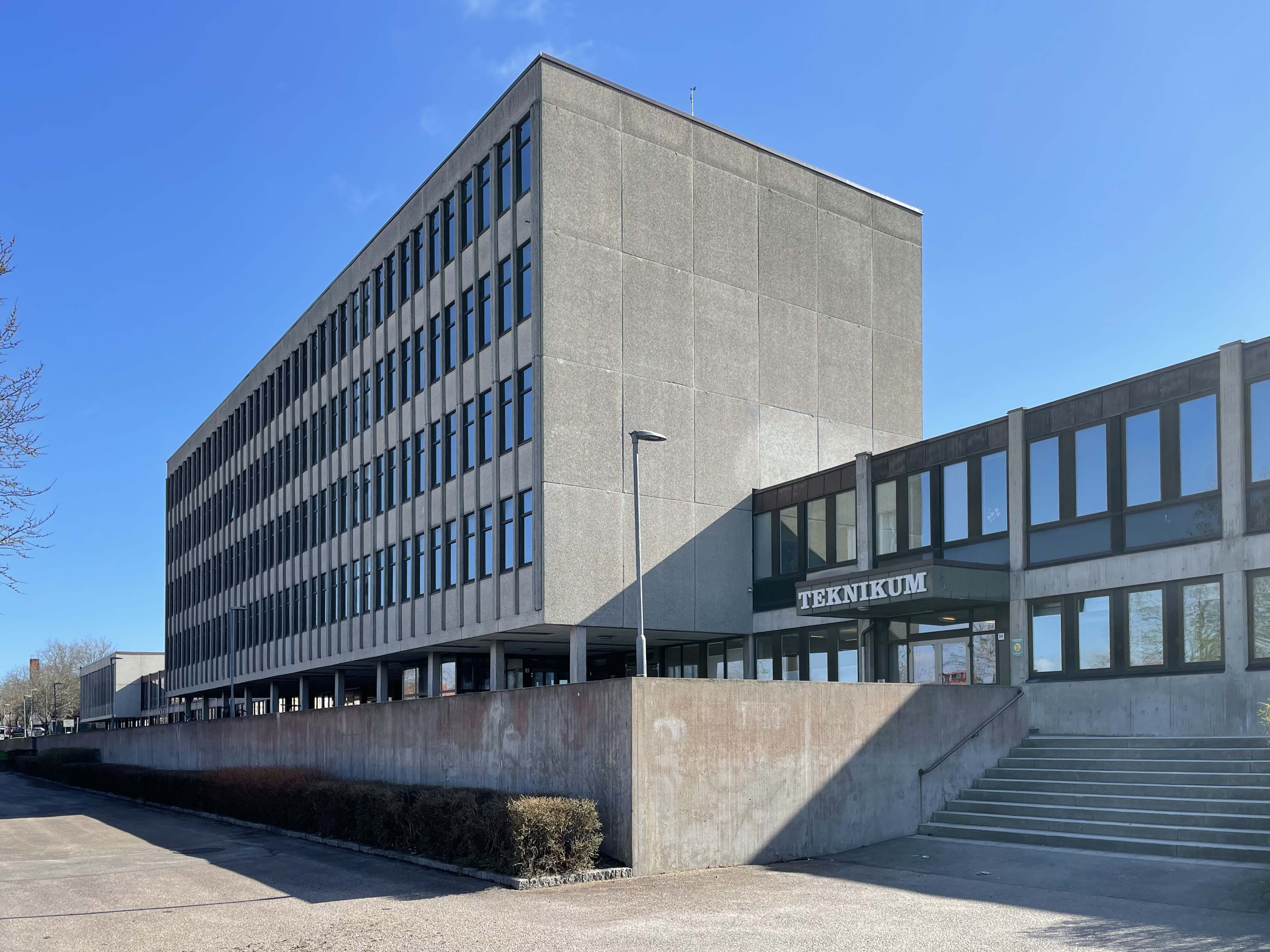

Location
- Växjö, Kronoberg County; Sweden
- Coordinates: 56°52′59″N 14°49′00″E

Information
- Type: Public
- Established: 1961
- School district: Växjö
- Principal: Ulrika Boström, Johan Krantz, Anna Lantz, Magnus Nilsson
- Grades: 10th, 11th and 12th
- Enrollment: 623(2021)
- Nickname: Teknis (old)
- Website: www.teknikum.se

Teknikum is an upper secondary school (in Swedish called gymnasieskola) located in Växjö, Sweden.

The school was founded in 1961 as an engineering school, offering three-year programs in mechanical, chemical, electrical and construction engineering, with an optional fourth year providing the degree of gymnasieingenjör. Although the latter was a professional degree (awarded until 1992), a large share of the students continued their education at university level, e.g. as Master of Science in Engineering.

Since the 1990s the focus on engineering has diminished, and the school offers a wide range of secondary level educational programs.

The building itself has been commonly referred to as “the prison” due to its architectural style and has been regarded by the locals of Växjö and others from Småland as the ugliest building in Småland
