= Sigge Bergman =

Swedish sports executive and journalist

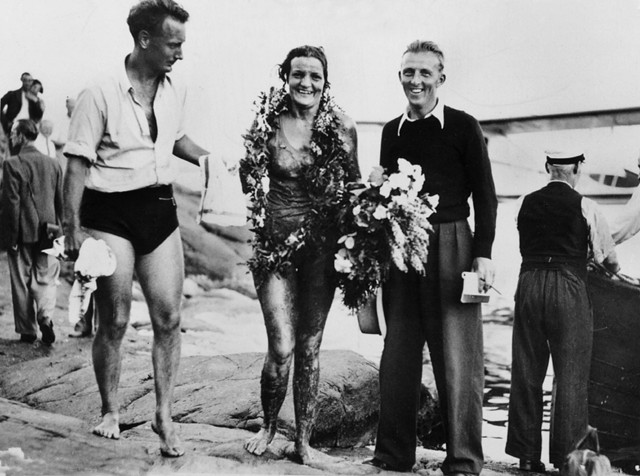
- Sigge Bergman, Sally Bauer and Staffan Tjerneld in 1938
- Born: 31 July 1905; Luleå, Sweden
- Died: 6 January 2001 (aged 95); Rättvik, Sweden
- Occupations: sports executive, journalist

Sigge Bergman (31 July 1905 – 6 January 2001) was a Swedish sports executive and journalist. He was secretary general of the International Ski Federation (FIS) from 1961 to 1979, and before that the founding chairman of the Technical Committee for Nordic Skiing (1946–1961). In 1934 he introduced alpine skiing in Sweden together with Olle Rimfors after having studied at the ski school of Hannes Schneider in St. Anton. Winner of several alpine competitions in Sweden in the thirties.

He held several key positions in the Swedish Ski Association from 1939 to 1976, among these President (1952–1961). He was also a chairman of the Swedish National Olympic Committee, twice appointed chef de mission at the Olympic Games (Munich 1972 and Montreal 1976). As a leader, technical official or journalist, he attended 24 Olympic Games between 1936 and 1994. He became famous for daring to challenge Avery Brundage's views on amateurism in the early seventies.

He was an honorary member of FIS, Swedish Ski Association, Swiss Ski Association, Swedish National Olympic Committee, Ski Club of Great Britain, Ski Club Arlberg, Kandahar Ski Club. He was decorated with the Olympic Order in silver 1997 by his long-time colleague Marc Hodler.
