= Badminton Sweden =

Badminton federation in Sweden

Badminton Sweden Svenska Badmintonförbundet
- Formation: 9 April 1936
- Type: Sports governing body
- Headquarters: Stockholm
- Location: Sweden
- Official language: Swedish
- President: Tommy Theorin
- Affiliations: BEC, BWF
- Website: www.badminton.nu

Badminton Sweden (Swedish: Svenska Badmintonförbundet) is the governing body for the sport of badminton in Sweden. The organization was established in 1936, and hosts the annual Swedish Open tournament. It has been affiliated with Badminton World Federation since 1937 and affiliated to Swedish Sports Confederation since 1942.

== Tournaments ==
- Swedish Open, an annual open tournament held from 1959 until 1999, revived in 2018.
- Swedish Masters International Badminton Championships, a tournament originally organized by Stockholm Badminton Federation, held from 2004-2017.
