= Swedish Ski Association =

Governing body for skiing in Sweden

- Svenska Skidförbundet
- Formation: 11 December 1908
- Founded at: Sundsvall, Sweden
- Type: sports governing body
- Headquarters: Falun
- Location: Sweden
- Official language: Swedish
- Chairman: Anders Furbeck
- Affiliations: International Ski and Snowboard Federation (FIS)
- Website: www.skidor.com

The Swedish Ski Association (Swedish: Svenska Skidförbundet) is a sports governing body for skiing in Sweden. It was established in Sundsvall on 11 December 1908 as the Swedish Cross-Country Skiing Association (Swedish: Svenska skidlöpningsförbundet) before changing name in 1911. The headquarters were originally located in Stockholm before relocating to Falun on 3 May 2001.

Their objective is to get as many people as possible to discover the joy and benefits of being active in the snow. Covering and arranging national and major international championships, youth activities, encouraging exercise, improving public health and through this making social impact.

The Swedish Ski Association played an important role in innovating in Swedish skiing techniques in the early 20th century. The association studied Norwegian ski techniques and Norwegian ski terrains. The association concluded that traditional long Swedish skis were less useful in Norwegian ski terrains, encouraged its skiers to train in Norwegian terrains, and organized training camps where skiers were trained in Norwegian ski techniques.

In October 2024, Anders Furbeck was elected chairperson after Karin Mattsson.

== Chairpeople ==
- 1908–1910 – Fritz af Sandeberg
- 1910–1915 – C. G. A. Lindencrona
- 1915–1922 – Sven Hermelin
- 1922–1948 – Sixtus Janson
- 1948–1952 – Björn Kjellström
- 1952–1961 – Sigge Bergman
- 1961–1965 – Karl Arne Wegerfelt
- 1965–1974 – Nils Stenberg
- 1974–1977 – Stig Synnergren
- 1977–1982 – Arne Jägmo
- 1982–1996 – Sven Larsson
- 1996–2008 – Carl Eric Stålberg
- 2008–2018 – Mats Årjes
- 2018–2024 – Karin Mattsson
- 2024–present – Anders Furbeck
