= Swedish Biathlon Federation =

Biathlon governing body in Sweden

- Svenska Skidskytteförbundet
- Formation: 1986
- Type: sports governing body
- Headquarters: Östersund
- Location: Sweden
- Official language: Swedish

The Swedish Biathlon Federation (Swedish: Svenska Skidskytteförbundet) is a special sports association for biathlon in Sweden. It was established in 1986. In November 1987 it was appointed into the Swedish Sports Confederation from 1 July 1988. Its headquarters are in Östersund.
