= Hudiksvall Municipality =

Hudiksvall Municipality Hudiksvalls kommun
- Municipality
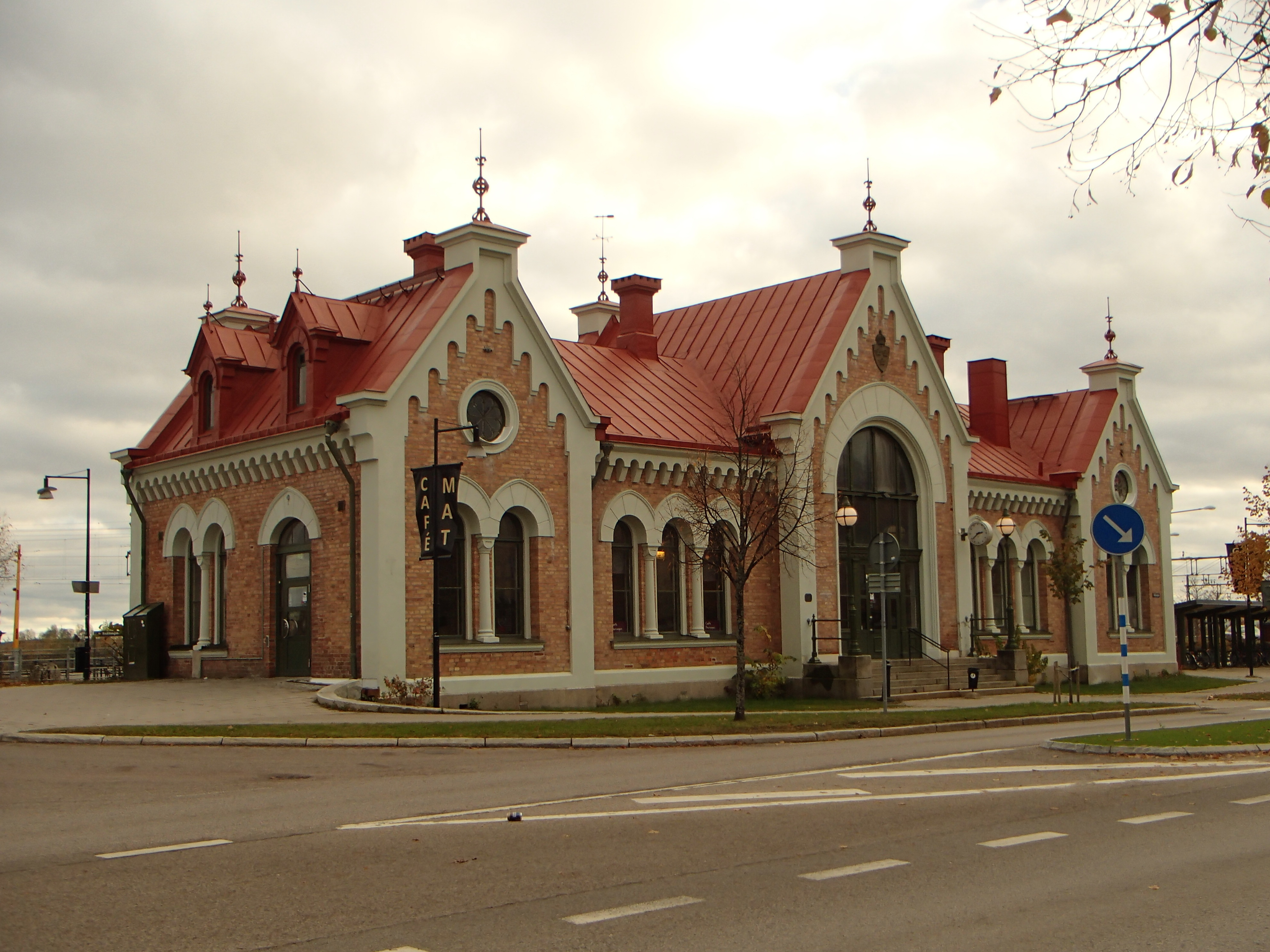
- Hudiksvalls Train Station

- Flag Coat of arms

- Coordinates: 61°44′N 17°07′E
- Country: Sweden
- County: Gävleborg County
- Seat: Hudiksvall

Area
  - Total: 4,516.62 km^{2} (1,743.88 sq mi)
  - Land: 2,488.89 km^{2} (960.97 sq mi)
  - Water: 2,027.73 km^{2} (782.91 sq mi)
- Area as of 1 January 2014.

Population (30 June 2025)
  - Total: 37,526
  - Density: 15.077/km^{2} (39.050/sq mi)
- Time zone: UTC+1 (CET)
  - Summer (DST): UTC+2 (CEST)
- ISO 3166 code: SE
- Province: Hälsingland
- Municipal code: 2184
- Website: www.hudiksvall.se

Hudiksvall Municipality (Swedish: Hudiksvalls kommun) is one of Sweden's 290 municipalities, situated in Gävleborg County, east central Sweden. Its seat is in the city Hudiksvall.

The present municipality was formed in 1971 when the City of Hudiksvall was amalgamated with four surrounding rural municipalities. Minor amalgamations had also taken place in 1952 and 1965, reducing the number of local government entities in the area.

== Geography ==
Hudiksvall is located approximately 305 kilometres (190 mi) from Stockholm, 130 kilometres (81 mi) from Gävle, and 84 kilometres (52 mi) from Sundsvall.

The municipality furthermore comprises several islands, such as Agön, Innerston, Kråkön, and Olmen.

=== Localities ===
Figures as of 2000, from Statistics Sweden:

- Hudiksvall 15,325 (2002)
- Iggesund, 3,444
- Delsbo, 2,284
- Enånger, 724
- Friggesund, 599
- Sörforsa, 1,540

== Demographics ==
This is a demographic table based on Hudiksvall Municipality's electoral districts in the 2022 Swedish general election sourced from SVT's election platform, in turn taken from SCB official statistics.

In total there were 37,708 inhabitants with 29,561 Swedish citizen adults eligible to vote. The political demographics were 55.3% for the left coalition and 43.5% for the right coalition. Indicators are in percentage points except population totals and income.

Location	Residents	Citizen adults	Left vote	Right vote	Employed	Swedish parents	Foreign heritage	Income SEK	Degree
Location			%	%					
Björkberg	2,261	1,600	51.6	47.0	78	79	21	25,184	40
Bobygden-Kalvst.	1,375	1,083	52.4	45.4	83	95	5	25,275	29
Delsbo V	1,478	1,151	55.8	42.7	75	87	13	19,043	30
Delsbo Ö	1,627	1,221	58.1	39.7	82	91	9	23,635	31
Edsta-Sanna	2,425	1,826	51.2	48.0	87	92	8	28,077	39
Enånger	1,418	1,168	55.4	43.9	83	94	6	25,362	32
Fridhem-Åvik	1,561	1,258	54.3	44.2	82	88	12	25,708	45
Friggesund-Hålsjö	1,995	1,605	49.9	48.9	80	93	7	22,100	27
Helenedal	2,296	1,909	57.4	41.6	87	90	10	27,927	56
Håsta	2,007	1,525	52.5	46.7	90	94	6	30,964	41
Idenor	2,215	1,394	67.6	31.4	67	58	42	19,461	31
Iggesund N	1,883	1,444	56.4	42.4	81	83	17	25,424	26
Iggesund S	1,609	1,201	59.8	38.4	66	78	22	20,266	25
Kristineberg	1,604	1,329	59.3	39.7	79	88	12	23,073	35
Kyrkbacken	1,278	1,109	57.6	41.2	83	90	10	24,778	47
Njutånger	1,289	1,005	49.5	49.1	85	94	6	25,994	30
Näsviken	1,589	1,232	50.1	48.4	82	95	5	25,656	33
Rogsta	1,499	1,215	47.5	51.4	87	95	5	26,180	32
Svågadalen	439	373	52.8	45.5	75	88	12	19,421	24
Sörforsa	2,368	1,858	56.7	42.5	82	92	8	25,295	34
Västertull	1,767	1,554	59.4	39.5	77	90	10	21,803	44
Östertull	1,725	1,501	60.9	38.3	82	89	11	25,114	45
Source: SVT

== Climate ==
Climate data for Hudiksvall (2002–2021 averages); extremes since 1934
Month	Jan	Feb	Mar	Apr	May	Jun	Jul	Aug	Sep	Oct	Nov	Dec	Year
Record high °C (°F)	12.0 (53.6)	13.5 (56.3)	17.8 (64.0)	24.3 (75.7)	30.3 (86.5)	31.4 (88.5)	34.0 (93.2)	32.5 (90.5)	26.7 (80.1)	20.9 (69.6)	17.6 (63.7)	12.3 (54.1)	34.0 (93.2)
Mean maximum °C (°F)	6.0 (42.8)	8.1 (46.6)	13.8 (56.8)	18.7 (65.7)	23.4 (74.1)	27.2 (81.0)	28.8 (83.8)	27.4 (81.3)	22.9 (73.2)	16.4 (61.5)	11.2 (52.2)	6.9 (44.4)	29.8 (85.6)
Mean daily maximum °C (°F)	−0.8 (30.6)	0.5 (32.9)	5.0 (41.0)	10.3 (50.5)	14.9 (58.8)	19.6 (67.3)	22.5 (72.5)	21.0 (69.8)	16.5 (61.7)	9.7 (49.5)	4.1 (39.4)	1.0 (33.8)	10.4 (50.7)
Daily mean °C (°F)	−4.1 (24.6)	−3.3 (26.1)	0.5 (32.9)	4.9 (40.8)	9.5 (49.1)	14.2 (57.6)	17.3 (63.1)	16.0 (60.8)	11.7 (53.1)	5.8 (42.4)	1.2 (34.2)	−2.1 (28.2)	6.0 (42.7)
Mean daily minimum °C (°F)	−7.3 (18.9)	−7.0 (19.4)	−4.2 (24.4)	−0.6 (30.9)	4.1 (39.4)	8.7 (47.7)	12.1 (53.8)	11.0 (51.8)	6.9 (44.4)	1.8 (35.2)	−1.6 (29.1)	−5.0 (23.0)	1.6 (34.8)
Mean minimum °C (°F)	−18.4 (−1.1)	−18.7 (−1.7)	−13.7 (7.3)	−6.9 (19.6)	−2.7 (27.1)	2.8 (37.0)	6.0 (42.8)	4.4 (39.9)	−0.1 (31.8)	−5.8 (21.6)	−9.5 (14.9)	−14.9 (5.2)	−22.0 (−7.6)
Record low °C (°F)	−29.1 (−20.4)	−32.0 (−25.6)	−26.3 (−15.3)	−19.0 (−2.2)	−7.6 (18.3)	−1.4 (29.5)	1.9 (35.4)	0.6 (33.1)	−3.7 (25.3)	−13.5 (7.7)	−18.8 (−1.8)	−25.6 (−14.1)	−32.0 (−25.6)
Average precipitation mm (inches)	57.8 (2.28)	39.2 (1.54)	35.1 (1.38)	29.4 (1.16)	42.5 (1.67)	61.7 (2.43)	71.1 (2.80)	82.2 (3.24)	46.1 (1.81)	66.3 (2.61)	55.5 (2.19)	67.2 (2.65)	654.1 (25.76)
Average extreme snow depth cm (inches)	37 (15)	44 (17)	36 (14)	11 (4.3)	0 (0)	0 (0)	0 (0)	0 (0)	0 (0)	2 (0.8)	12 (4.7)	23 (9.1)	52 (20)
Source 1: SMHI Open Data
Source 2: SMHI climate data 2002–2021

Climate data for Delsbo (2002–2021 averages); extremes since 1901
Month	Jan	Feb	Mar	Apr	May	Jun	Jul	Aug	Sep	Oct	Nov	Dec	Year
Record high °C (°F)	11.0 (51.8)	13.0 (55.4)	16.7 (62.1)	25.4 (77.7)	28.8 (83.8)	32.8 (91.0)	33.6 (92.5)	33.0 (91.4)	26.6 (79.9)	21.8 (71.2)	15.9 (60.6)	11.9 (53.4)	33.6 (92.5)
Mean maximum °C (°F)	5.6 (42.1)	7.0 (44.6)	12.2 (54.0)	19.2 (66.6)	24.0 (75.2)	27.0 (80.6)	28.6 (83.5)	26.8 (80.2)	22.1 (71.8)	15.5 (59.9)	10.7 (51.3)	6.9 (44.4)	29.8 (85.6)
Mean daily maximum °C (°F)	−1.9 (28.6)	−0.7 (30.7)	4.0 (39.2)	10.6 (51.1)	15.3 (59.5)	19.8 (67.6)	22.5 (72.5)	20.7 (69.3)	15.9 (60.6)	8.8 (47.8)	3.3 (37.9)	0.0 (32.0)	9.9 (49.7)
Daily mean °C (°F)	−5.7 (21.7)	−4.7 (23.5)	−0.8 (30.6)	4.6 (40.3)	9.4 (48.9)	13.9 (57.0)	16.7 (62.1)	15.3 (59.5)	11.0 (51.8)	5.0 (41.0)	0.3 (32.5)	−3.4 (25.9)	5.1 (41.2)
Mean daily minimum °C (°F)	−9.5 (14.9)	−8.7 (16.3)	−5.6 (21.9)	−1.5 (29.3)	3.4 (38.1)	8.0 (46.4)	10.9 (51.6)	9.8 (49.6)	6.0 (42.8)	1.2 (34.2)	−2.8 (27.0)	−6.8 (19.8)	0.4 (32.7)
Mean minimum °C (°F)	−22.1 (−7.8)	−21.2 (−6.2)	−17.2 (1.0)	−8.3 (17.1)	−3.6 (25.5)	1.9 (35.4)	5.0 (41.0)	3.0 (37.4)	−1.5 (29.3)	−6.5 (20.3)	−11.5 (11.3)	−17.6 (0.3)	−25.2 (−13.4)
Record low °C (°F)	−35.6 (−32.1)	−35.9 (−32.6)	−31.9 (−25.4)	−21.2 (−6.2)	−8.5 (16.7)	−2.6 (27.3)	1.3 (34.3)	−2.0 (28.4)	−8.2 (17.2)	−15.0 (5.0)	−23.5 (−10.3)	−33.2 (−27.8)	−35.9 (−32.6)
Average precipitation mm (inches)	34.4 (1.35)	22.6 (0.89)	22.8 (0.90)	20.2 (0.80)	41.4 (1.63)	61.1 (2.41)	66.5 (2.62)	72.5 (2.85)	41.1 (1.62)	50.2 (1.98)	37.2 (1.46)	37.8 (1.49)	507.8 (20)
Source 1: SMHI
Source 2: SMHI climate data 2002–2021

Climate data for Kuggören, on the open Bothnian Sea (2002–2021 averages); extremes 1970–1987 & since 1996
Month	Jan	Feb	Mar	Apr	May	Jun	Jul	Aug	Sep	Oct	Nov	Dec	Year
Record high °C (°F)	10.4 (50.7)	10.9 (51.6)	16.4 (61.5)	21.7 (71.1)	24.8 (76.6)	29.6 (85.3)	31.2 (88.2)	30.1 (86.2)	25.3 (77.5)	20.0 (68.0)	16.0 (60.8)	12.1 (53.8)	31.2 (88.2)
Mean maximum °C (°F)	6.4 (43.5)	7.3 (45.1)	11.8 (53.2)	15.5 (59.9)	19.2 (66.6)	23.7 (74.7)	25.3 (77.5)	24.4 (75.9)	21.0 (69.8)	14.6 (58.3)	10.5 (50.9)	7.3 (45.1)	26.5 (79.7)
Mean daily maximum °C (°F)	0.4 (32.7)	0.7 (33.3)	3.6 (38.5)	7.2 (45.0)	11.2 (52.2)	16.3 (61.3)	19.6 (67.3)	18.9 (66.0)	15.0 (59.0)	8.9 (48.0)	4.7 (40.5)	2.3 (36.1)	9.1 (48.3)
Daily mean °C (°F)	−1.9 (28.6)	−1.7 (28.9)	0.8 (33.4)	4.2 (39.6)	8.2 (46.8)	13.2 (55.8)	16.7 (62.1)	16.2 (61.2)	12.2 (54.0)	6.7 (44.1)	2.7 (36.9)	0.0 (32.0)	6.4 (43.6)
Mean daily minimum °C (°F)	−4.2 (24.4)	−4.1 (24.6)	−2.1 (28.2)	1.1 (34.0)	5.2 (41.4)	10.1 (50.2)	13.8 (56.8)	13.4 (56.1)	9.4 (48.9)	4.5 (40.1)	0.7 (33.3)	−2.3 (27.9)	3.8 (38.8)
Mean minimum °C (°F)	−12.7 (9.1)	−12.8 (9.0)	−9.0 (15.8)	−3.1 (26.4)	1.0 (33.8)	6.3 (43.3)	10.0 (50.0)	8.9 (48.0)	4.5 (40.1)	−1.6 (29.1)	−5.9 (21.4)	−9.4 (15.1)	−15.9 (3.4)
Record low °C (°F)	−28.1 (−18.6)	−26.6 (−15.9)	−22.2 (−8.0)	−10.0 (14.0)	−3.1 (26.4)	1.8 (35.2)	6.6 (43.9)	5.9 (42.6)	−1.2 (29.8)	−8.2 (17.2)	−12.8 (9.0)	−24.6 (−12.3)	−28.1 (−18.6)
Average precipitation mm (inches)	29.5 (1.16)	16.9 (0.67)	18.1 (0.71)	21.4 (0.84)	36.2 (1.43)	49.4 (1.94)	47.8 (1.88)	69.9 (2.75)	41.0 (1.61)	59.1 (2.33)	42.7 (1.68)	43.0 (1.69)	475 (18.69)
Source 1: SMHI Open Data
Source 2: SMHI Open Data

== Economy ==
The largest employer is the municipality and the county council, where around 38% of the work force have its work place.

The largest private employer is the paper product company Holmen where about 10% of the work force work.

In the old history, the industry was dominated by fishing. In the 19th century the forest industry came to dominate, further enhanced by the improved transportations which the rail roads provided in the second half of that century. Although in decline during the 20th century, half of the municipal industry is still based around forest industry.

Employees per sectors:

1. Pulp, paper, and paper goods: 29%
2. Machine technical industry: 20%
3. Electronics 19%
4. Metal products: 8%
5. Wood products 7%.

The electronics industry is dominated by Ericsson Network Technologies making optical and copper wires for telecommunication systems. (Sources: , Holmen.com)

== Transportation ==
Hudiksvall is accessible via the European route E4 highway, and the East Coast Railway (Ostkustbanan).
