= Mechanical hackamore =

Variety of bitless horse headgear

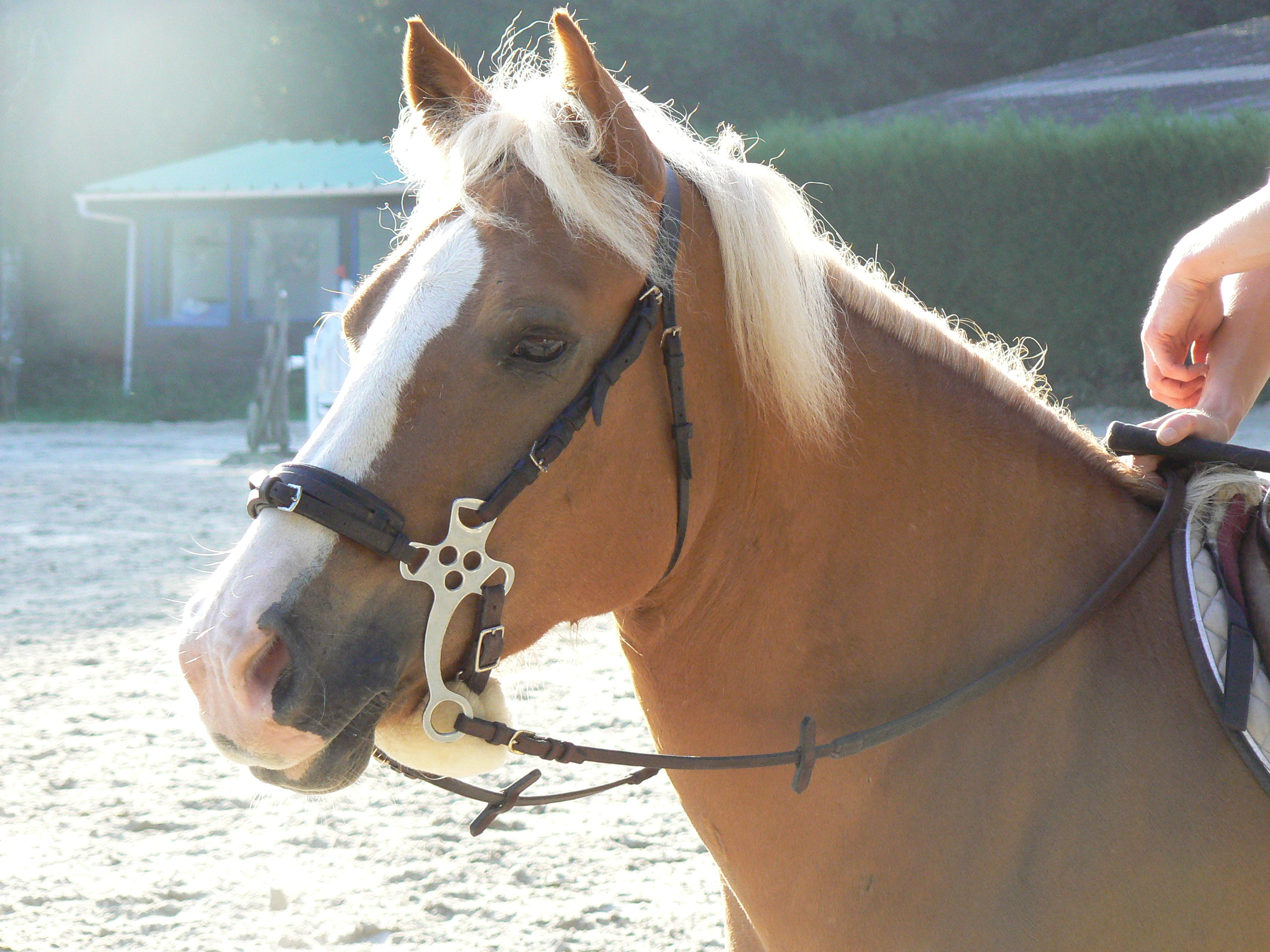
A mechanical hackamore

A mechanical hackamore is a piece of horse tack that is a type of bitless headgear for horses where the reins connect to shanks placed between a noseband and a curb chain. Other names include "hackamore bit", "brockamore", "English hackamore", "nose bridle" and "German hackamore". Certain designs have been called "Blair's Pattern" and the "W. S. Bitless Pelham".

== Design ==
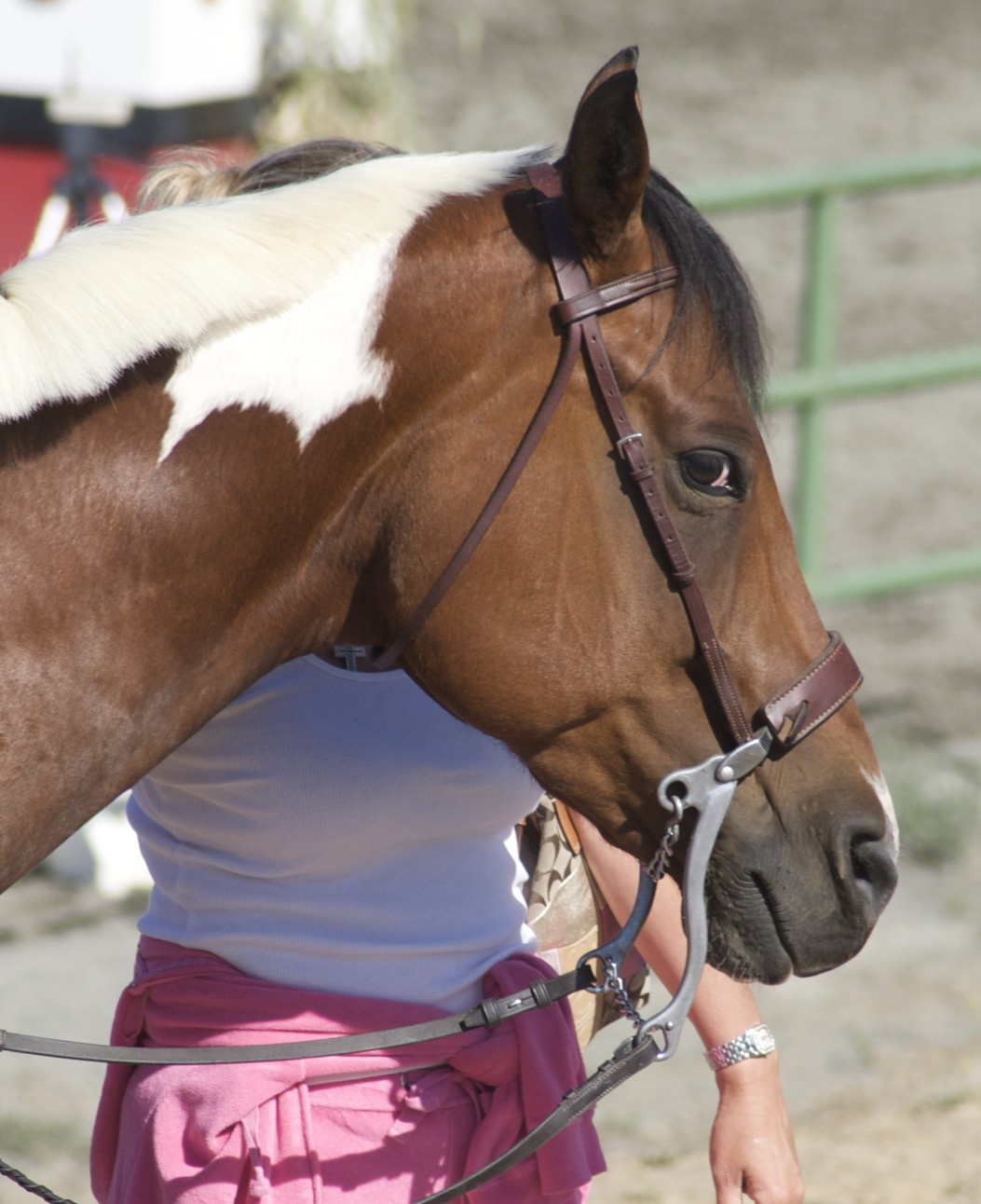
A mechanical hackamore with curb chain and longer shanks, a more severe design

A mechanical hackamore has a partial noseband, usually of leather, sometimes covered with fleece for extra comfort. However, the noseband can also be very harsh; some are made of rubber-covered cable, stiff metal, or even bicycle chain (though usually covered in plastic). The curb chain is usually a flat-linked chain, though it may be made of anything from a relatively mild flat leather strap to very severe designs with heavy chain or even solid metal bars. The noseband and curb chain are connected by a metal link that also includes the long shank that applies pressure to the nose, chin groove and poll when the reins are tightened.

The mechanical hackamore is unrelated to a hackamore except to the extent that both are headgear that control a horse with some form of noseband rather than a bit in the horse's mouth. Because the mechanical hackamore uses shanks and leverage, it is not a hackamore. A mechanical hackamore works similarly to a curb bit. The shanks and curb chain serve to increase pressure on the nose, jaw, and poll

== History ==
The mechanical hackamore may be a relatively modern invention. In the United States, a device with shanks and a noseband, called a "hackamore bit" was mentioned in at least one western riding-based horse training book by the late 1930s. Early patent applications were filed in 1940 for a "Hackamore bit" and a "leverage hackamore bridle". Additional patent applications were filed during the 1940s, and a significant increase in patent applications for various mechanical hackamore designs occurred from the 1950s forward. Descriptions of the mechanical hackamore appeared in general interest books on horses during that decade.

== Uses and limitations ==
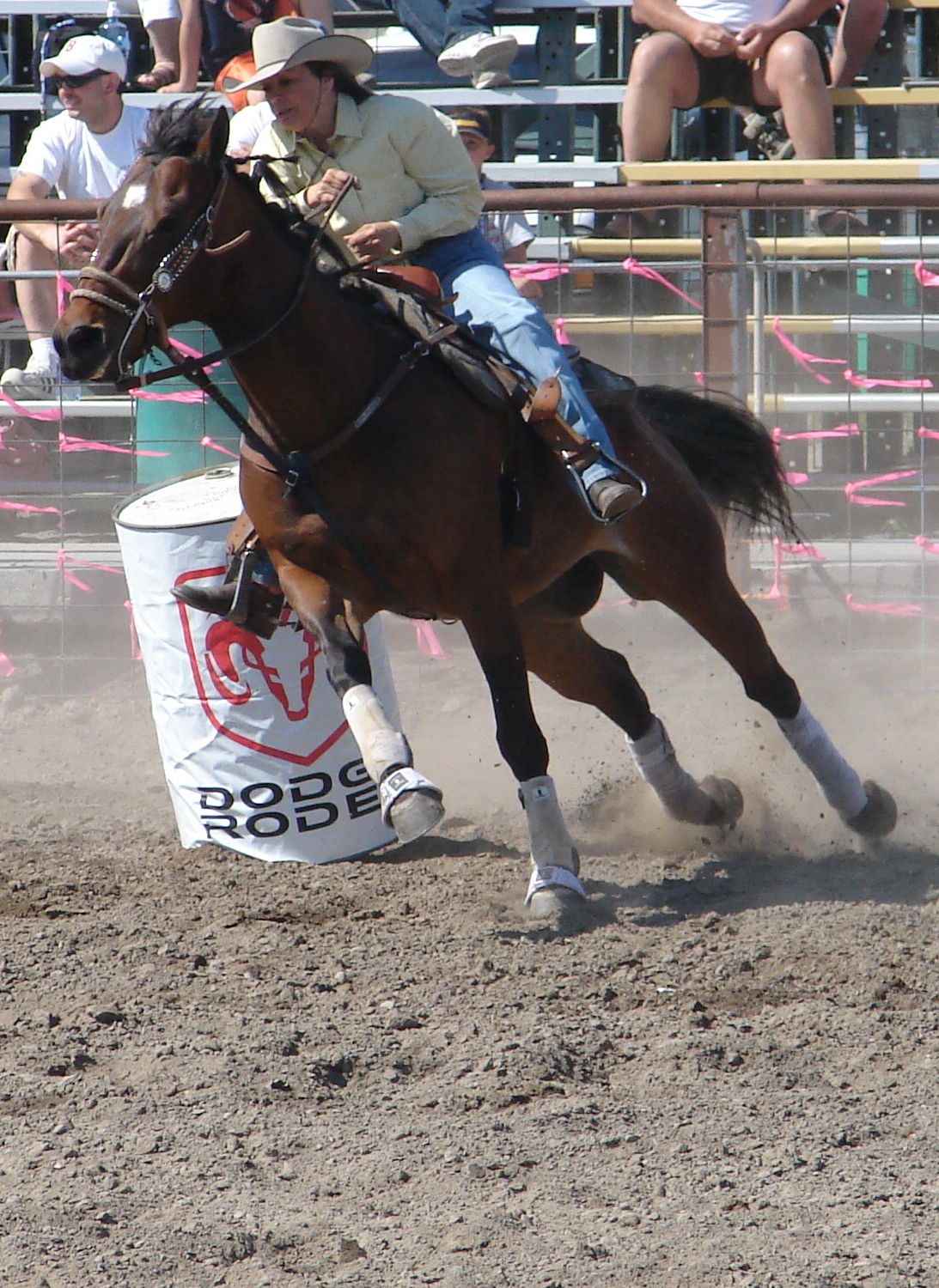
Mechanical hackamore used in conjunction with a tiedown in barrel racing

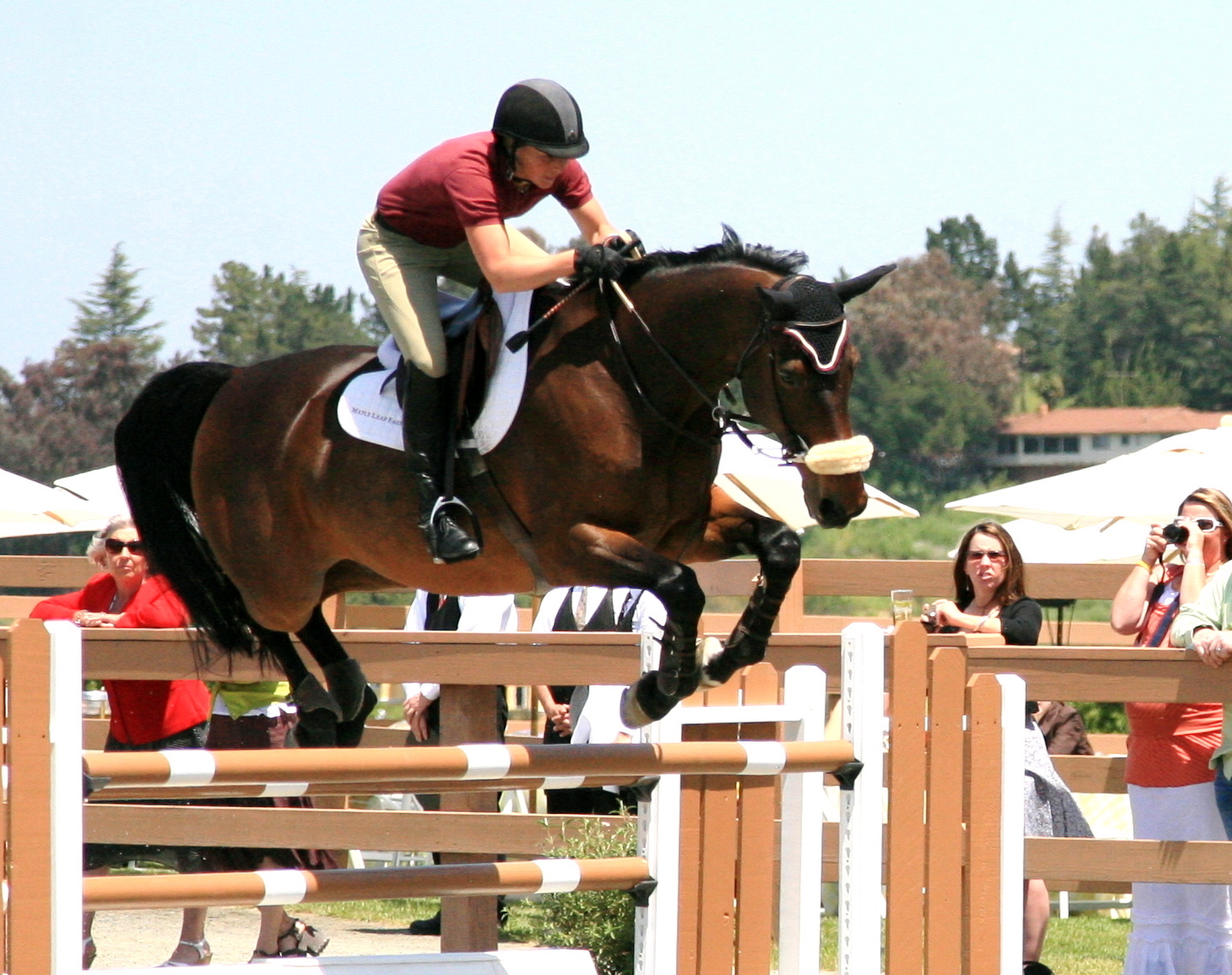
Show jumping in a mechanical hackamore.

Mechanical hackamores often used in competitions where there are no specific bitting rules, such as rodeo and O-Mok-See events, and in the show jumping arena. They are seen in endurance riding and competitive trail riding because they allow a horse to easily eat and drink without removing headgear. They are not permitted in most other horse show disciplines. They are also used by casual riders, especially for trail riding, and are particularly popular with hunters who must ride and camp in freezing weather where a frozen bit can injure the horse's tongue.

Mechanical hackamores lack the sophistication of bits or a bosal, cannot turn a horse easily with direct reining, and are primarily used for their considerable stopping power. Horses ridden in these devices quite often develop a bad habit of head-tossing. The longer the shanks, the more severe the action. Similarly, a thinner noseband is also more severe. Occasionally it is used for a horse that has learned to ignore bit pressure on the mouth, or for horses with an injured mouth.

It is incorrect to assume that a mechanical hackamore is milder than a bitted bridle, it is not. The device has potential for abuse at the hands of a rough rider, similar to that of a curb bit. While mechanical hackamores made entirely of leather with short shanks can be relatively mild, the addition of a longer shank and chain or metal under the jaw or over the nose can make this device a very severe piece of equipment that borders on animal abuse, thus making the device quite controversial in some equestrian circles. If adjusted too low, it can also put excessive pressure on the horse's nose cartilage, possibly even breaking it, and low placement may also obstruct the horse's breathing. In cases of a severe mechanical hackamore with long shanks, abusive use has been claimed to risk breaking the horse's jaw. For example, a 20 lb. pull on the reins of a mechanical hackamore with 8-inch shanks will result in 160 pounds of force applied across the bridge of the horse's nose.

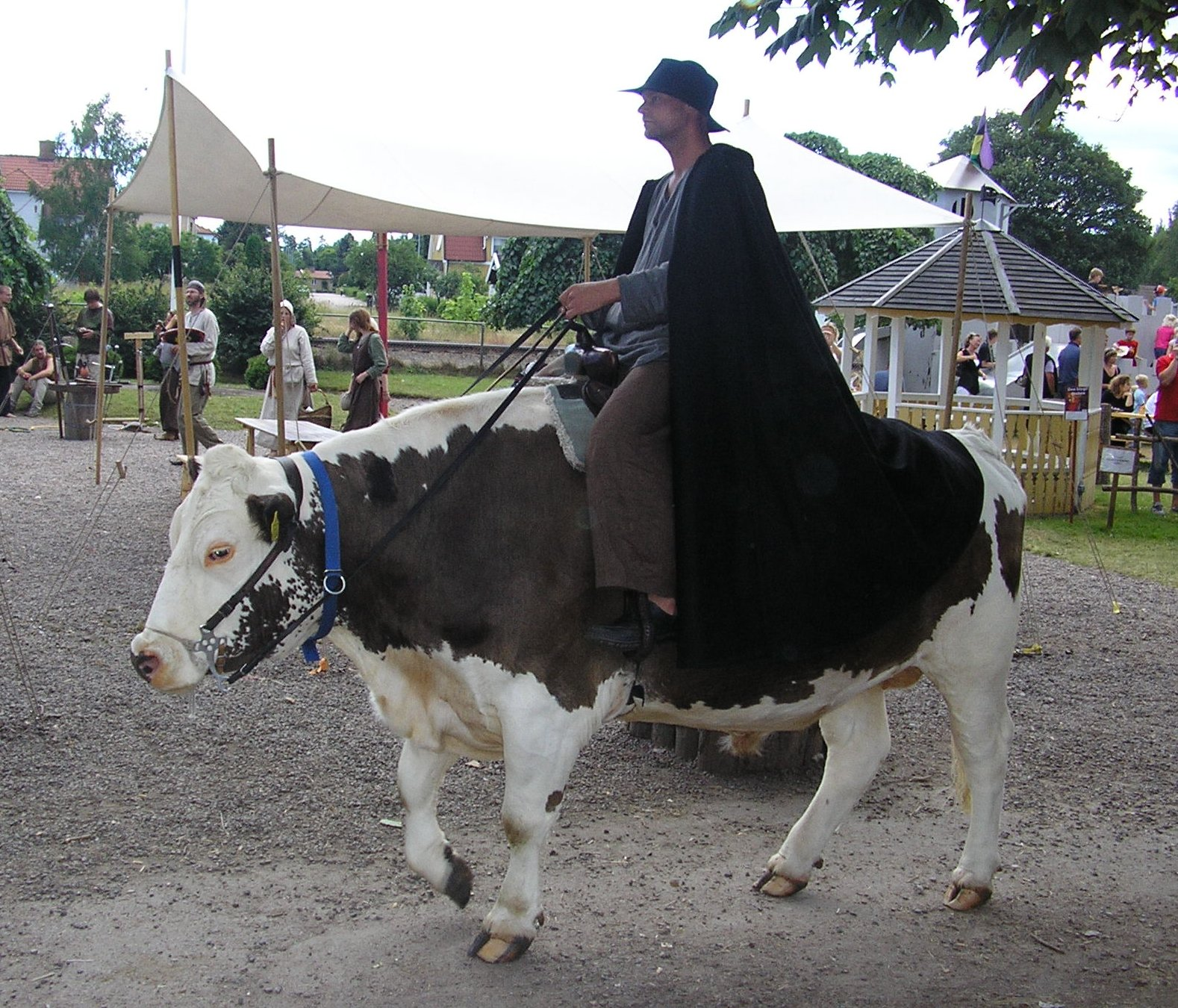
Though rarely seen on other livestock, the mechanical hackamore can be used to control any riding animal
