= WTOC =

WTOC may refer to:

- WTOC-TV, a television station (channel 23, virtual 11) licensed to Savannah, Georgia, United States
- WTOC (AM), a radio station (1360 AM) licensed to Newton, New Jersey, United States
- WTOC-FM, a radio station (95.7 FM) licensed to Toccoa, Georgia
- World Trail Orienteering Championships; see also Trail orienteering
