= Martin Fredholm =

Swedish orienteering competitor

Personal information
- Born: 12 January 1977 (age 49)

Sport
- Sport: Trail Orienteering
- Club: OK Linne
Medal record
Representing Sweden
Trail orienteering
World Championships
Gold medal – first place	2016 Strömstad/Tanum	PreO Open
Silver medal – second place	2013 Vuokatti	PreO Open

Martin Fredholm (born 12 January 1977) is a Swedish orienteer. He's a multiple time world champion in trail orienteering. He is currently a member in the IOF Trail Orienteering Commission.

He also provides the scoring system in multiple orienteering events, such as World Trail Orienteering Championships.
