= Martin Jullum =

Norwegian orienteer (born 1988)

Personal information
- Born: 15 June 1988 (age 38)

Sport
- Sport: Trail Orienteering
- Club: Halden SK
Medal record
Representing Norway
Trail orienteering
World Championships
Gold medal – first place	2014 Trentino-Veneto	TempO
Silver medal – second place	2016 Strömstad-Tanum	PreO Open
Bronze medal – third place	2015 Zagreb	PreO Open
World TempO Trophy
Bronze medal – third place	2012 Scotland

Martin Jullum (born 15 June 1988) is a Norwegian orienteer. He's a multiple time world champion in trail orienteering, in both PreO and TempO. He defended his PhD thesis at the Department of Mathematics, University of Oslo in 2016.
