= World Trail Orienteering Championships =

Annual international orienteering competition

- Status: active
- Genre: sporting event
- Date: June–August
- Frequency: annual
- Location: various
- Inaugurated: 2004
- Organiser: IOF

The World Trail Orienteering Championships were first held in 2004 and has taken place most years since. The majority of the championships have been held in Europe, with 2005 the only exception to date.

The current championship events are:

- PreO - the traditional event
- TempO - competition consisting of timed controls only (since 2013)
- TrailO Relay – for three-person teams (since 2016, replacing the previous team event)

== Venues ==
Year	Days	Location	Senior Event Adviser(s)	Ref
2004 (in conjunction with FootO WOC 2004)	September 15–18	Västerås, Sweden		
2005 (in conjunction with FootO WOC 2005)	August 9–11	Aichi, Japan		
2006 (in conjunction with WMTBOC 2006)	July 9–14	Joensuu, Finland	Peter Gehrmann	
2007 (in conjunction with FootO WOC 2007)	August 17–26	Kyiv, Ukraine	Brian Parker	
2008 (in conjunction with FootO WOC 2008)	July 12–26	Olomouc, Czech Republic	Hannu Niemi	
2009 (in conjunction with FootO WOC 2009)	August 18–23	Miskolc, Hungary	Richard Keighley, Krešo Keresteš	
2010 (in conjunction with FootO WOC 2010)	August 4–6	Trondheim, Norway	Brian Parker, Antti Rusanen	
2011 (in conjunction with FootO WOC 2011)	August 13–20	Savoie, France	Owe Fredholm	
2012	June 6–9	(United Kingdom) Scotland, Great Britain	Jari Turto	
2013 (in conjunction with FootO WOC 2013)	July 6–14	Vuokatti, Finland	Roberta Falda, Libor Forst	
2014 (in conjunction with FootO WOC 2014)	July 5–13	Trentino-Veneto, Italy	Lennart Wahlgren	
2015	June 22–28	Zagreb, Croatia	Vibeke Vogelius, Lauri Kontkanen	
2016 (in conjunction with FootO WOC 2016)	August 20–28	Strömstad-Tanum, Sweden	Libor Forst	
2017	July 10–15	Birštonas, Lithuania	Ola Wiksell, Kyllikki Anttila	
2018 (in conjunction with FootO WOC 2018)	August 6–10	Daugavpils, Latvia	Hannu Niemi, Anne Straube	
2019	June 23–29	Idanha-a-Nova, Portugal	Damir Gobec	
~~2020~~	~~November 28–December 5~~	~~Hong Kong~~ (Note: Cancelled due to the COVID-19 pandemic)		
2022 (Note: Postponed from 2021 due to the COVID-19 pandemic)	July 19–23	Jelenia Góra, Poland	Dušan Furucz	
2023	July 3-7	(Czech Republic) Zákupy, Czechia	Ján Furucz	
2025	August 26-31	Hungary and Slovakia	Per Stålnacke, Petteri Hakala	
2027 Planned	July 9-14	(United States) USA	Libor Forst, Leif Eriksson	

== PreO ==
This was called the "individual competition" before 2010.

=== Open ===
Year	Gold	Silver	Bronze	Number of controls (day 1)	Number of controls (day 2)
2004	Ola Jansson (SWE)	Martin Fredholm (SWE)	Stig Gerdtman (SWE)	18 controls, 2 TCs	16 controls, 2 TCs
2005	Per Midthaugen (NOR)	Stig Gerdtman (SWE)	Mitsumasa Sugimoto (JPN)	17 controls, 2 TCs	15 controls, 2 TCs
2006	Martin Fredholm (SWE)	Stig Gerdtman (SWE)	Per Midthaugen (NOR)		
2007	Kreso Kerestes (SLO)	Antti Rusanen (FIN)	Ole-Johan Waaler (NOR)		
2008	Anne Straube (GER)	Martin Fredholm (SWE)	Jari Turto (FIN)		
2009	Vitaliy Kyrychenko (UKR)	Lauri Kontkanen (FIN)	Haruo Kimura (JPN)		
2010	Stig Gerdtman (SWE)	Lauri Kontkanen (FIN)	Ivo Tisljar (CRO)	20 controls, 2 TCs	20 controls, 2 TCs
2011	Lauri Kontkanen (FIN)	Antti Rusanen (FIN)	Ivo Tisljar (CRO)	20 controls, 2 TCs	20 controls, 2 TCs
2012	Stig Gerdtman (SWE)	Vitaliy Kyrychenko (UKR)	Sergiy Stoian (UKR)	20 controls (1 voided), 2 TCs	23 controls, 2 TCs
2013	Jari Turto (FIN)	Martin Fredholm (SWE)	Antti Rusanen (FIN)	20 controls, 2 timed stations, 4 TCs	19 controls, 1 timed station, 2 TCs
2014	Guntars Mankus (LAT)	Marit Wiksell (SWE)	Geir Myhr Øien (NOR)	12 controls (1 voided), 1 timed station, 2 TCs	20 controls, 2 timed station, 3 TCs
2015	Michele Cera (ITA)	Antti Rusanen (FIN)	Martin Jullum (NOR)	26 controls, 2 timed stations, 6 TCs	26 controls, 2 timed stations, 6 TCs
2016	Martin Fredholm (SWE)	Martin Jullum (NOR)	Janis Rukšans (LAT)	21 controls (1 voided), 1 timed station, 3 TCs	28 controls, 1 timed station, 3 TCs
2017	Lars Jakob Waaler (NOR)	Pinja Mäkinen (FIN)	Geir Myhr Øien (NOR)	21 controls (2 voided), 1 timed station, 3 TCs	28 controls, 3 TCs
2018	Ján Furucz (SVK)	Geir Myhr Øien (NOR)	Antti Rusanen (FIN)		
2019	Pinja Mäkinen (FIN)	Geir Myhr Øien (NOR)	Kreso Kerestes (SLO)		
2022	Ján Furucz (SVK)	Antti Rusanen (FIN)	Bjarne Friedrichs (GER)		
2023	Arno Grønhovd (NOR)	Bjarne Friedrichs (GER)	Michele Cera (ITA)		
2025	Anders Höije (NOR)	Tommi Hakuli (FIN)	Robertas Stankevič (LTU)		

=== Physically challenged ===
Year	Gold	Silver	Bronze	Number of controls (day 1)	Number of controls (day 2)
2004	Jan-Erik Haug (NOR)	Valeriy Tsodikov (UKR)	David Irving (USA)	18 controls, 2 TCs	16 controls, 2 TCs
2005	Evaldas Butrimas (LTU)	David Irving (USA)	John Crosby (GBR)	17 controls, 2 TCs	15 controls, 2 TCs
2006	Dave Gittus (GBR)	Nils-Olav Andersson (SWE)	Lennart Wahlgren (SWE)		
2007	Roberta Falda (ITA)	Evaldas Butrimas (LTU)	Bernt Gustafsson (SWE)		
2008	Lennart Wahlgren (SWE)	Zdenko Horjan (CRO)	Dave Gittus (GBR)		
2009	Lennart Wahlgren (SWE)	Zdenko Horjan (CRO)	Ola Jansson (SWE)		
2010	Ola Jansson (SWE)	Lennart Wahlgren (SWE)	Søren Saxtorph (DEN)	20 controls, 2 TCs	20 controls, 2 TCs
2011	Dmitry Kucherenko (RUS)	Søren Saxtorph (DEN)	Inga Gunnarsson (SWE)	20 controls, 2 TCs	20 controls, 2 TCs
2012	Ola Jansson (SWE)	Pekka Seppä (FIN)	Dmitry Kucherenko (RUS)	20 controls (1 voided), 2 TCs	23 controls, 2 TCs
2013	Jana Kostova (CZE)	Pavel Dudík (CZE)	Søren Saxtorph (DEN)	20 controls, 2 timed stations, 4 TCs	19 controls, 1 timed station, 2 TCs
2014	Michael Johansson (SWE)	Ola Jansson (SWE)	John Crosby (GBR)	12 controls (1 voided), 1 timed station, 2 TCs	20 controls, 2 timed station, 3 TCs
2015	Vladislav Vovk (UKR)	Ivica Bertol (CRO)	Søren Saxtorph (DEN)	26 controls, 2 timed stations, 6 TCs	26 controls, 2 timed stations, 6 TCs
2016	Michael Johansson (SWE)	Pavel Shmatov (RUS)	Ola Jansson (SWE)	21 controls (1 voided), 1 timed station, 3 TCs	28 controls, 1 timed station, 3 TCs
2017	Ola Jansson (SWE)	Jana Kostová (CZE)	Pekka Seppä (FIN)	21 controls (2 voided), 1 timed station, 3 TCs	28 controls, 3 TCs
2018	Ola Jansson (SWE)	Michael Johansson (SWE)	Svein Jakobsen (NOR)		
2019	Ola Jansson (SWE)	Pavel Shmatov (RUS)	Michael Johansson (SWE)		
2022	Michael Johansson (SWE)	Vladyslav Vovk (UKR)	Jana Kostová (CZE)		
2023	Michael Johansson (SWE)	Ola Jansson (SWE)	Vladyslav Vovk (UKR)		
2025	Michael Johansson (SWE)	Alejandro Aguilar Lara (ESP)	Ola Jansson (SWE)		

== TempO (since 2013) ==
All competitors, regardless of disability, participate in one single class only since there is no physical movement involved in the competition process.

=== Open ===
Year	Gold	Silver	Bronze	Number of controls (qualification)	Number of controls (final)
2010 (World TempO Trophy)	Lauri Kontkanen (FIN)	Lars Jakob Waaler (NOR)	Martin Fredholm (SWE)		
2011 (World TempO Trophy)	Martin Jullum (NOR)	Antti Rusanen (FIN)	Lars Jakob Waaler (NOR)		
2012 (World TempO Trophy)	Marit Wiksell (SWE)	Guido Michelotti (ITA)	Martin Jullum (NOR)	8 timed stations, 24 TCs	
2013	Pinja Mäkinen (FIN)	Marit Wiksell (SWE)	Lauri Kontkanen (FIN)	8 timed stations, 24 TCs	5 timed stations, 15 TCs
2014	Martin Jullum (NOR)	Lauri Kontkanen (FIN)	Pinja Mäkinen (FIN)	6 timed stations, 24 TCs	5 timed stations, 25 TCs
2015	Antti Rusanen (FIN)	Ján Furucz (SVK)	Sondre Ruud Bråten (NOR)	7 timed stations, 28 TCs	7 timed stations, 35 TCs
2016	Lars Jakob Waaler (NOR)	Marit Wiksell (SWE)	Pinja Mäkinen (FIN)	4 timed stations, 20 TCs	5 timed stations, 30 TCs
2017	Vetle Ruud Bråten (NOR)	Martin Aarholt Waaler (NOR)	Ján Furucz (SVK)	5 timed stations, 25 TCs	6 timed stations, 30 TCs
2018	Petteri Hakala (FIN)	Lennart Wahlgren (SWE); Ján Furucz (SVK)			
2019	Marit Wiksell (SWE)	Ines Domingues (POR)	Antti Rusanen (FIN)		
2022	Sondre Ruud Bråten (NOR)	Ondřej Macek (CZE)	Alessio Tenani (ITA); Pavel Ptáček (CZE)		
2023	Ondřej Macek (CZE)	Simone Frascaroli (ITA)	Daniel Locker (CZE)		
2025	Marcello Lambertini (ITA)	Anders Höije (SWE)	Anders Haugskott (NOR)		

=== Paralympic ===
Year	Gold	Silver	Bronze	Number of controls (day 1)	Number of controls (day 2)
2010 (World TempO Trophy)	Ola Jansson (SWE)	Lennart Wahlgren (SWE)	Bohuslav Hulka (CZE)		

== Team competition (before 2015) ==
=== Paralympic ===
Year	Gold	Silver	Bronze
2004	Great Britain; Dave Gittus; Karen Darke; Sue Boyt	Norway; Arne Ask; Gunnar Maelen; Jan Erik Haug	Lithuania; Evaldas Butrimas; Zenoida Pashkevich; Tadeush Shimkovich
2005	Great Britain; John Crosby; Karen Darke; Dick Keighley	Lithuania; Evaldas Butrimas; Zenoida Pashkevich; Tadeush Shimkovich	Japan; Hidetou Kijima; Masaki Kashiwagi; Aki Karumori
2006	Sweden	Norway	Finland
2007	Sweden	Russia	Ukraine
2008	Lithuania	Finland	Sweden

=== Open ===
Year	Gold	Silver	Bronze
2009	Ukraine	Sweden	Czech Republic
2010	Sweden	Finland	Croatia
2011	Finland	Norway	Sweden
2012	Finland	Sweden	Croatia
2013	Sweden	Croatia	Denmark
2014	Croatia	Sweden	Latvia
2015	Ukraine	Croatia	Finland

== Relay (since 2016) ==
=== Open ===
Year	Gold	Silver	Bronze
2016	Slovakia; Marián Mikluš; Dušan Furucz; Ján Furucz	Portugal; Edgar Domingues; Jorge Baltazar; João Pedro Valente	Finland; Martti Inkinen; Pinja Mäkinen; Antti Rusanen
2017	Slovenia; Emil Kacin; Mateja Keresteš; Krešo Keresteš	Norway; Geir Myhr Øien; Sigurd Dæhli; Lars Jakob Waaler	Czech Republic; Miroslav Slovák; Libor Forst; Pavel Kurfürst
2018	Norway; Lars Jakob Waaler; Geir Myhr Øien; Sondre Ruud Bråten	Latvia; Kristaps Mierlauks; Laura Eliza Lapina; Ilze Lapina	Finland; Pinja Mäkinen; Sami Hyvönen; Antti Rusanen
2019	Finland; Pinja Mäkinen; Sami Hyvönen; Antti Rusanen	Spain; Hector Lorenzo Yustos; Jorge Caraca Valente Barrera; Arturo Garcia Dengra	Great Britain; Charles Bromley Gardner; Tom Dobra; John Kewley
2022	Czech Republic; Daniel Locker; Ondřej Macek; Pavel Ptáček	Italy; Alessio Tenani; Marcello Lambertini; Aaron Gaio	Slovakia; Ján Furucz; Šimon Mižúr; Pavol Bukovác
2023	Germany; Ralph Körner; Nina Döllgast; Bjarne Friedrichs	Italy; Alessio Tenani; Marcello Lambertini; Aaron Gaio	Czech Republic; Daniel Locker; Ondřej Macek; Pavel Ptáček
2025	Czech Republic; Šimon Mareček; Pavel Ptáček; Ondřej Macek	Italy; Alessio Tenani; Marcello Lambertini; Aaron Gaio	Slovakia; Jonatán Furucz; Šimon Mižúr; Pavol Bukovác

=== Paralympic ===
Year	Gold	Silver	Bronze
2016	Sweden; Inga Gunnarsson; Ola Jansson; Michael Johansson	Ukraine; Iryna Kulikova; Yehor Surkov; Vladislav Vovk	Finland; Kari Pinola; Tuomo Markelin; Pekka Seppä
2017	Czech Republic; Miroslav Špidlen; Pavel Dudík; Jana Kosťová	Norway; Svein Jakobsen; Egil Sønsterudbråten; Arne Ask	Sweden; Inga Gunnarsson; Michael Johansson; Ola Jansson
2018	Sweden; Inga Gunnarsson; Michael Johansson; Ola Jansson	Czech Republic; Miroslav Špidlen; Pavel Dudík; Jana Kosťová	Russia; Dmitriy Dokuchaev; Nataliia Salakhova; Pavel Shmatov
2019	Czech Republic; Hana Doležalová; Pavel Dudík; Jana Kosťová	Ukraine; Iryna Kulikova; Vladyslav Poznianskyi; Valerii Lytvynov	Russia; Dmitriy Dokuchaev; Nataliia Salakhova; Pavel Shmatov
2022	Czech Republic; Hana Doležalová; Pavel Dudík; Jana Kosťová	Spain; Miguel Ángel García Grinda; Juan Emilio Montero Sánchez; Alejandro Aguilar Lara	Ukraine; Iryna Kulikova; Vladyslav Vovk; Valerii Lytvynov
2023	Finland; Tuomo Niskanen; Eero Hakanen; Pekka Seppä	Sweden; Inga Gunnarsson; Michael Johansson; Ola Jansson	Czech Republic; Hana Doležalová; Pavel Dudík; Jana Kosťová
2025	Ukraine; Serhii Bielanenko; Valerii Lytvynov; Vladyslav Vovk	Spain; Sergio Martín Carrasco; Juan Emilio Montero Sánchez; Alejandro Aguilar Lara	Sweden; Ola Jansson; Rolf Karlsson; Michael Johansson
