= Jerker Lysell =

Swedish orienteering competitor

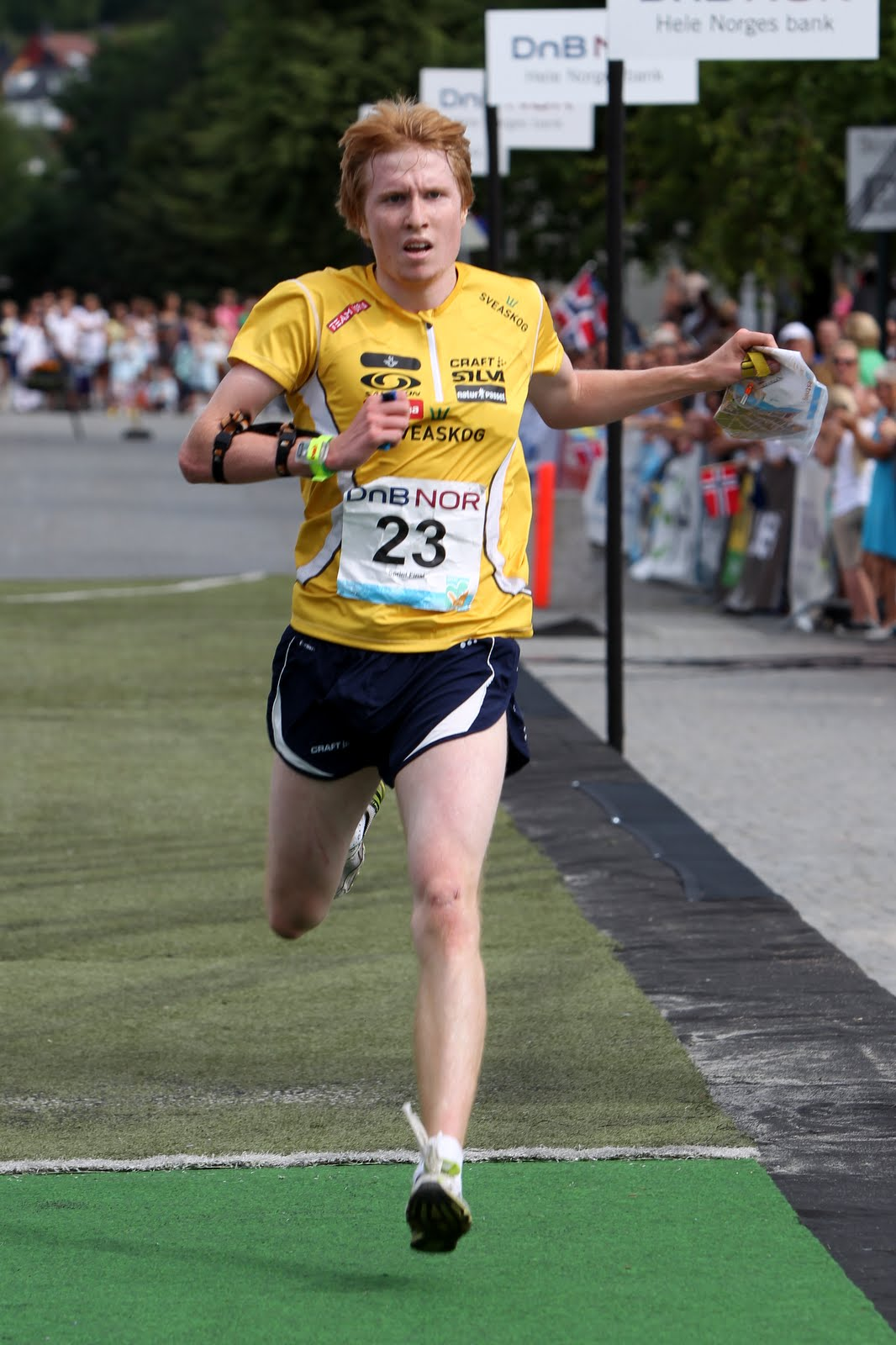
- Lysell in 2010

Personal information
- Born: 27 April 1989 (age 37)

Sport
- Sport: Orienteering
- Club: Rehns BK
Medal record
Men's orienteering
Representing Sweden
World Championships
Gold medal – first place	2016 Strömstad	Sprint
Gold medal – first place	2017 Tartu	Sprint relay
Bronze medal – third place	2015 Inverness	Sprint
Bronze medal – third place	2017 Tartu	Sprint
World Games
Gold medal – first place	2017 Wrocław	Sprint
Bronze medal – third place	2013 Cali	Sprint
European Championships
Bronze medal – third place	2012 Falun	Sprint

Jerker Lysell (born 27 April 1989) is a Swedish orienteering competitor, and world champion in sprint.

== Career ==
Lysell won a bronze medal in the sprint at the 2012 European Orienteering Championships in Falun, tying with Daniel Hubmann.

He competed at the 2012 World Orienteering Championships. In the sprint competition he qualified for the final, where he placed 13th.

He won gold medal in sprint at the 2016 World Orienteering Championships in Strömstad.

At the 2017 World Orienteering Championships in Tartu he was part of the Swedish winning team in the mixed sprint relay, and he won a bronze medal in the sprint contest.
