= Techniques de Randonnée Équestre de Compétition =

Equestrian discipline

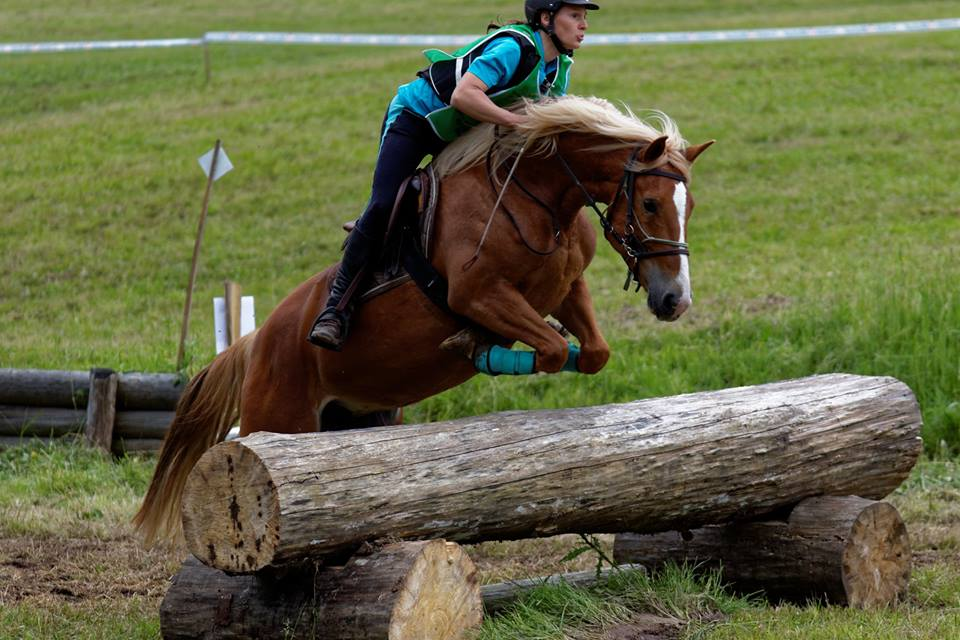
Le tronc

TREC, short for the French Techniques de Randonnée Équestre de Compétition is an equestrian discipline designed to test horse and rider. With origins in France, the sport has spread through Europe, and was introduced to the UK by the British Horse Society (BHS) in 1998. The sport is now known as British TREC and is run by TREC GB. TREC competitions consist of three separate events (phases) - mounted orienteering, a demonstration of control of the horse's paces and an obstacle course - all completed over the course of one or two days, and points scored, with the highest scoring being declared the overall event winner.

== Phase one: Parcours d'Orientation et de Régularité (POR) ==
The first phase consists of mounted orienteering where riders copy a route from a marked map onto their own map, and follow this route at a speed determined by the organisers. The length of the route varies according to the level of the competition, ranging from 10 km at beginner levels up to 45 km at championship levels. The complexity of the navigating and challenge of the terrain also increases at higher level competitions, demanding greater skill. There are checkpoints along the route, which are not marked on the map, these are designed to ensure that the route is ridden accurately and at the correct speed and that horses have sufficient rest along the route. the speed is changed at each checkpoint too, so that it is suitable for the terrain of the next section. There are also unstaffed ticket points on the route where the rider must stamp their own record card before proceeding.

A number of items of essential kit must be carried or worn:

- Hard hat (to the current standard as listed in the British TREC Rulebook, available from TREC GB)
- Rider's ID
- High-viz clothing
- Compass
- Map-marking pens
- Torch
- Headcollar and leadrope
- Waterproofs
- Basic first aid kit
- Tag attached to the saddle (with competitor number, horse details and organiser's telephone number on in case horse and rider become separated)
- Whistle
- Emergency farrier's tools and hoof-boot (compulsory for level three and above only)

Riders start the POR with 240 points, and the aim is to complete the phase with as many points remaining as possible. Penalties can be deducted in a number of ways including:

- Missing a checkpoint (50 penalties)
- Missing a 'good' ticket point or finding a 'bad' ticket point (30 penalties)
- Arrival at a checkpoint or staffed ticket via an incorrect route (30 penalties)
- Finding a checkpoint not on the intended route (30 penalties)
- Variations from the optimum speed between each checkpoint (1 penalty per full minute over or under ideal time)
- Turning around or stopping when seeing a checkpoint that is wrong. ( 30 penalties. )

== Phase two: Maîtrise des Allures (MA) ==
The MA phase is designed to demonstrate that a rider has a high degree of control over the horse, first in canter and then in walk. The rider must canter the horse slowly along a marked corridor, which is 2-4 m wide and up to 150 m long, and then turn around and walk the horse back quickly. There are up to 60 points available on this stage, depending on how slowly the horse canters and how fast he walks. If the horse leaves the corridor or breaks into another pace, the score is zero for that pace. The score is also 0 if the horse goes out of the corridor.

== Phase three: Parcours en Terrain Varie (PTV) ==
The PTV is a series of obstacles, designed to test the obedience, confidence, courage and balance of the horse and the correctness of the rider's aids. The course consists of up to 16 obstacles, to be tackled in a certain order and within a set time. The obstacles are formalisations of things that may be encountered on a ride in an unfamiliar location and may include jumps, ditches, water, steps and dismounted tasks.

There are up to 10 points available for each obstacle (totalling 160 available) these points are broken down into:

- Effectiveness (maximum 7 points)
- Style/Gait (from -2 to +3)
- Some types of obstacles are scored on the Time the horse and rider perform the specified task for

Penalties (from -3 to -1 for carelessness, brutality or dangerous riding) can also be deducted from the score as appropriate.

If the time allowed is exceeded, time penalties are deducted at a rate of 1 penalty for every 4 seconds (or period of 4 seconds started) over the time. A maximum of 30 points may be lost for time penalties. For example, a rider completing the course 6 seconds over the time limit would lose 2 time penalties.

There are some stipulations about tack for the PTV, such as the wearing of horse and rider ID and the use of a headcollar and leadrope if the horse has a running martingale. Whips and spurs must meet the criteria in the British TREC Rulebook.

== Levels and classes available ==
TREC competitions are run at a number of levels, ranging from 1 (the easiest) to 4 (the most technically demanding). The levels can be further split into A (Advanced) and B (Beginner) sub levels as well as the level itself. Championships and league competitions are run by TREC GB for all 4 main levels and also Level 2A.

Riders may compete alone at all levels or in a pair up to level 3 (level 4 pairs classes are run very occasionally but there is no league for level 4 pairs and it is not run at championships). Pairs ride the POR together and then complete the MA and PTV separately, and their scores are added together to determine the final placings.

== International competition ==
FITE run European and World Championships for senior and young riders (young riders are those under 21) on a periodic basis (usually one international competition every 2 years, alternating between Europeans and Worlds). Full details of dates and locations for international competitions may be found on the FITE website (link below). Young riders may also compete in the Duo class, which is run in a similar way to UK pairs classes.

== TREC variations ==
Several variations of TREC exist, catering for riders new to the sport, wishing to concentrate on particular aspects or different times of the year. These include

- Arena TREC - run in the winter and comprising the MA and PTV phases only
- 10:10 competitions - a shortened version of the sport comprising a 10km POR route, 100m MA course and 10 obstacle PTV
- Versatile TREC Horse - similar to 10:10 TREC but with a short obedience test done in a dressage arena (but marked on accuracy of movements rather than how the horse is going, as in dressage) instead of the POR phase

Full details of all the variations of TREC recognised in the UK can be found in the British TREC Rulebook, available from TREC GB.

== TREC Clubs ==
A number of TREC clubs exist in the UK. They run training events and competitions and are an important element of the social side of the sport. A full list of TREC clubs, the geographical areas they cover and their contact details can be found on the TREC GB website (link below).
