= Mounted orienteering =

Sport of orienteering while riding a horse

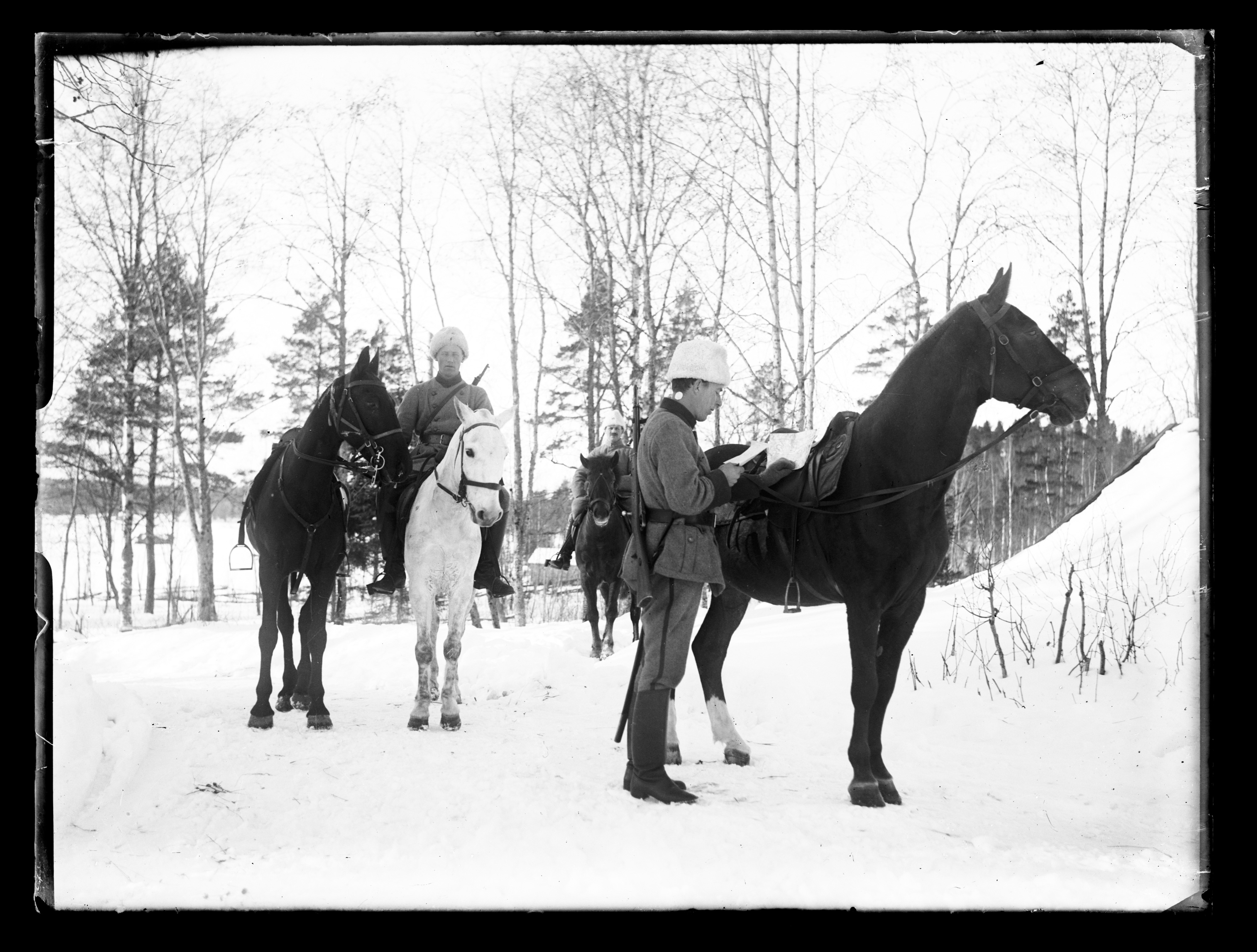
Horse rider reading map, 1924.

Mounted orienteering is the practice of orienteering while riding a horse or other riding animal.

== History ==
Mounted orienteering was an important function of cavalry units and today remains an important skill for mounted search and rescue.

== Competitive sport ==
Mounted orienteering can be completed competitively, either as a discipline in its own right, or as part of a multi-discipline sport such as Trec. The rules between governing bodies vary widely, although all require horsemanship and the ability to read a map and use a compass.

There are significant differences between mounted orienteering rules and those set down for foot orienteering by the International Orienteering Federation. Differences concern the map, course, route choice, and control points. Both sports use available maps, usually but not necessarily topographic maps. These maps generally are not appropriate for teaching beginning competitors to use the more advanced skills of field navigation. Hence, the required navigational skills are kept simple.

=== North America ===
American (NACMO) mounted orienteering competitions resemble rogaining in that courses are long and competitors choose the order in which to seek control points, and resemble treasure hunting or fox Oring in that once in the vicinity of a control point the task is to search for (rather than navigate to) a landmark and from there follow a compass heading to the control point. The landmark is described on a clue sheet, and often is not a feature on the map; e.g., the landmark might be a tree of a noted species and size, perhaps marked in some way for the competition. There will be several landmarks in the vicinity of the control point, usually on trails. The intent is to permit competitors who find more than one landmark to use them to triangulate the location of the control point on their map, then ride by the most efficient route directly to the control point.

=== Europe ===
In Europe, there is little mounted orienteering as a stand-alone sport, although there are significant elements present in endurance riding and as a specific event in the multi-discipline sport of Trec.

== See also ==
- Techniques de Randonnée Équestre de Compétition (TREC)
- Orienteering
