= Lip strap =

Horse tack

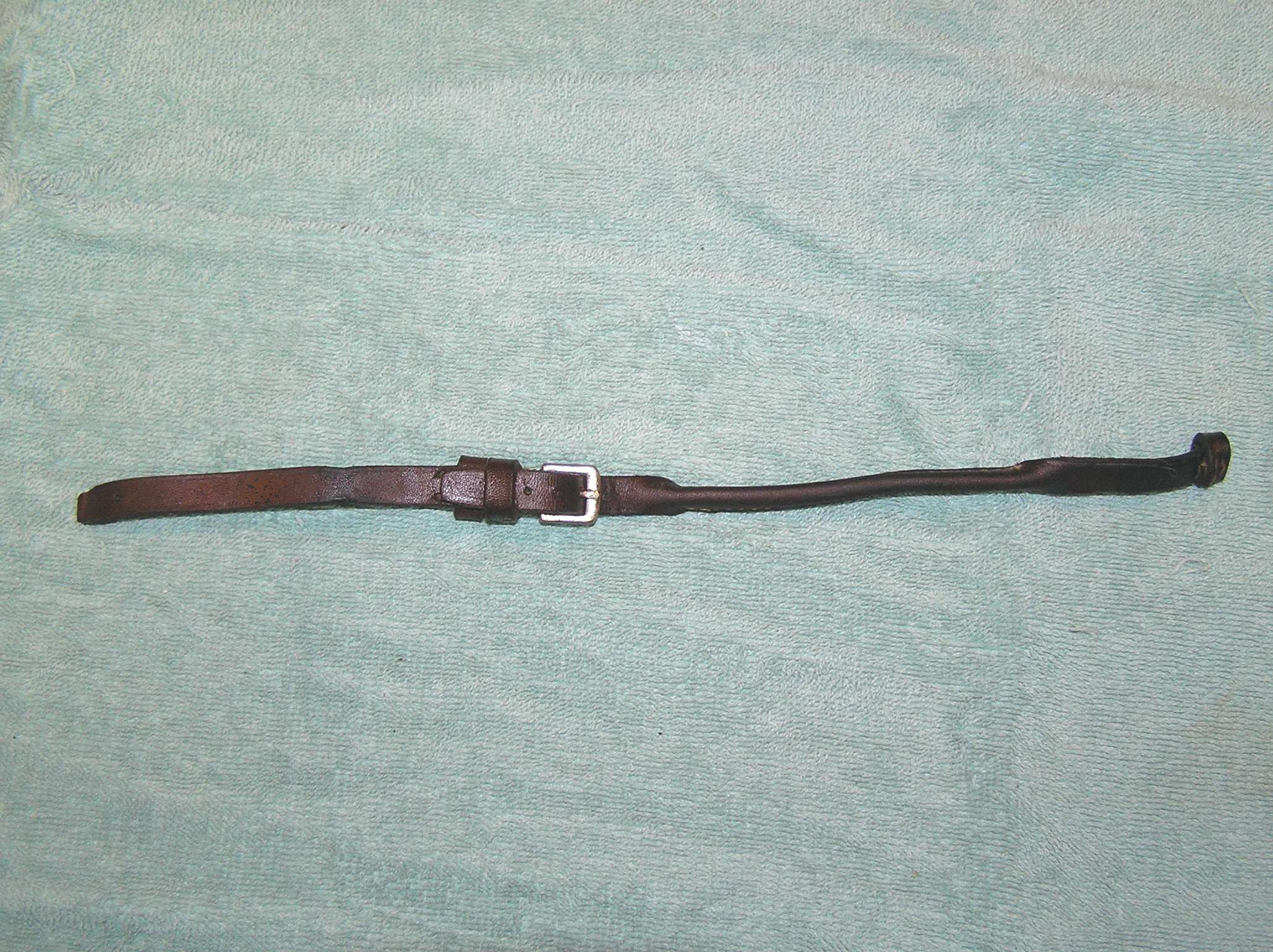
A leather lip strap

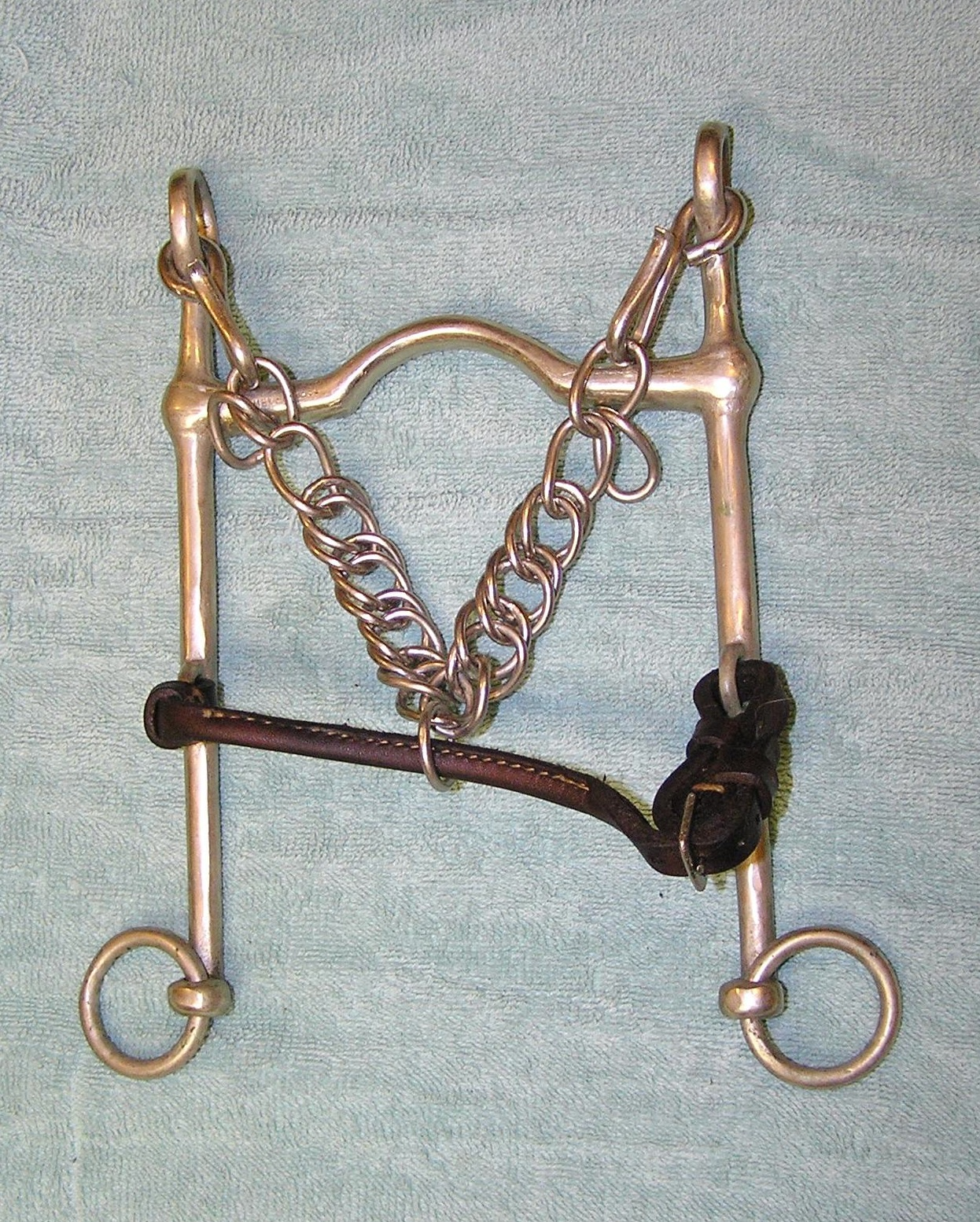
A lip strap attached to a curb bit and curb chain

A lip strap is a piece of horse tack made of rolled leather or occasionally thin chain, used sometimes on some types of English-style curb and pelham bits. The lip strap runs between the bit shanks and passes through a special center ring on a curb chain sometimes called the "fly link". The lip strap attaches to rings at midpoint of the shanks and buckles on the near side.

The lip strap helps keep a "mouthy" horse from mouthing or "lipping" the shank. It also helps prevent the curb chain from unfastening or otherwise moving too much.

In western riding, the "slobber bar" or "shank hobble" placed between the rein rings of a curb bit serves the same purpose as a lip strap. The leather curb strap-like attachments that are sometimes used to connect the rings of snaffle bit on a western bridle are also occasionally known as lip straps, though "bit hobble" is the term more often used.
