= Route choice (orienteering) =

Orienteering tactic

Route choice is a tactic in orienteering and related sports such as rogaining and adventure racing. These sports involve navigation from one control point to the next and, in most cases, the choice of route is left to the competitor. This is provided the rules permit route choice and the course is designed so that a choice exists. In trail orienteering and European style mounted orienteering route choice is not permitted. In United States style foot orienteering, route choice is absent from White courses, limited in Yellow courses, and a crucial element in the design of more advanced courses. Given a choice of route, the competitor evaluates trade-offs among such factors as distance, amount of "climb" (vertical movement), degree and extent of "fight" (travel through obstructing vegetation), mode of travel, technical difficulty, and the competitor's own preferences.

Among orienteering sports, route choice has varied importance. It is arguably the single most important tactical factor in rogaining, it is very important in mountain bike orienteering and ski orienteering, and it is less important in some other forms of orienteering. Route choice is completely absent from the Parcours d'Orientation et de Régularité (orienteering and pace racing phase) of Techniques de Randonnée Équestre de Compétition (TREC) competitions. In that phase, orienteering involves following exactly a course marked on a map but not in the terrain. For example, if a course follows the east bank of a ditch then traveling in the ditch or on its west bank would be an error.

Orienteering sports in which route choice is an important factor provide few locations where spectators can watch the race. During World Orienteering Championships 2009, the racers wore GPS tracking devices and many spectators watched them racing via the Internet. These spectators who watched the men's relay race "saw" Martin Johansson (Sweden) have a freak accident, and Thierry Gueorgiou (France), Anders Nordberg (Norway), and Michal Smola (Czech Republic) come to his aid.

== See also ==
- Military tactics
- Route assignment
- Passage planning
- Path selection in routing
- Travel behavior
- Wayfinding
