= 2017 World Trail Orienteering Championships =

- Host city: Birštonas
- Country: Lithuania
- Opening: 10 July 2017
- Closing: 15 July 2017
- Website: www.wtoc2017.lt

The 14th World Orienteering Championships were held in Birštonas, Lithuania in July 2017.

== Event dates and locations ==
Event locations within Lithuania

Date	Discipline	Location
10 July	TempO Model	Birštonas
10 July	Opening Ceremony	Birštonas
11 July	TempO	Harmony Park, Vazgaikiemis
12 July	PreO Model	Aukštadvaris
13 July	PreO Day 1	Rumšiškės
14 July	Relay	The Capitals Golf Club, Pipiriškės
15 July	PreO Day 2	Aukštadvaris

== Results ==
Event	Gold			Silver			Bronze		
PreO Open	Lars Jakob Waaler (NOR)	45 pts.	48"	Pinja Mäkinen (FIN)	45 pts.	55.5"	Geir Myhr Øien (NOR)	44 pts.	46"
PreO Paralympic	Ola Jansson (SWE)	42 pts.	52.5"	Vladyslav Vovk (UKR)	42 pts.	251"	Jana Kostová (CZE)	41 pts.	87"
TempO	Vetle Ruud Bråten (NOR)	282"		Martin Aarholt Waaler (NOR)	286"		Ján Furucz (SVK)	329.5"	
Relay Open	Slovakia (SVK): Emil Kacin; Mateja Keresteš; Krešo Keresteš	5'34"		Norway (NOR): Geir Myhr Øien; Sigurd Dæhli; Lars Jakob Waaler	6'16"		Czech Republic (CZE): Miroslav Slovák; Libor Forst; Pavel Kurfürst	6'49"	
Relay Paralympic	Ukraine (UKR): Iryna Kulykova; Yehor Surkov; Vladyslav Vovk	10'54.5"		Czech Republic (CZE): Miroslav Špidlen; Pavel Dudík; Jana Kostová	13'31"		Norway (NOR): Svein Jakobsen; Egil Sønsterudbråten; Arne Ask	13'33.5"	
