= Control point (orienteering) =

Waypoint in adventure sports

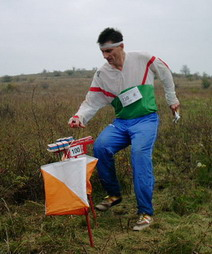
An orienteer about to "punch" at a control

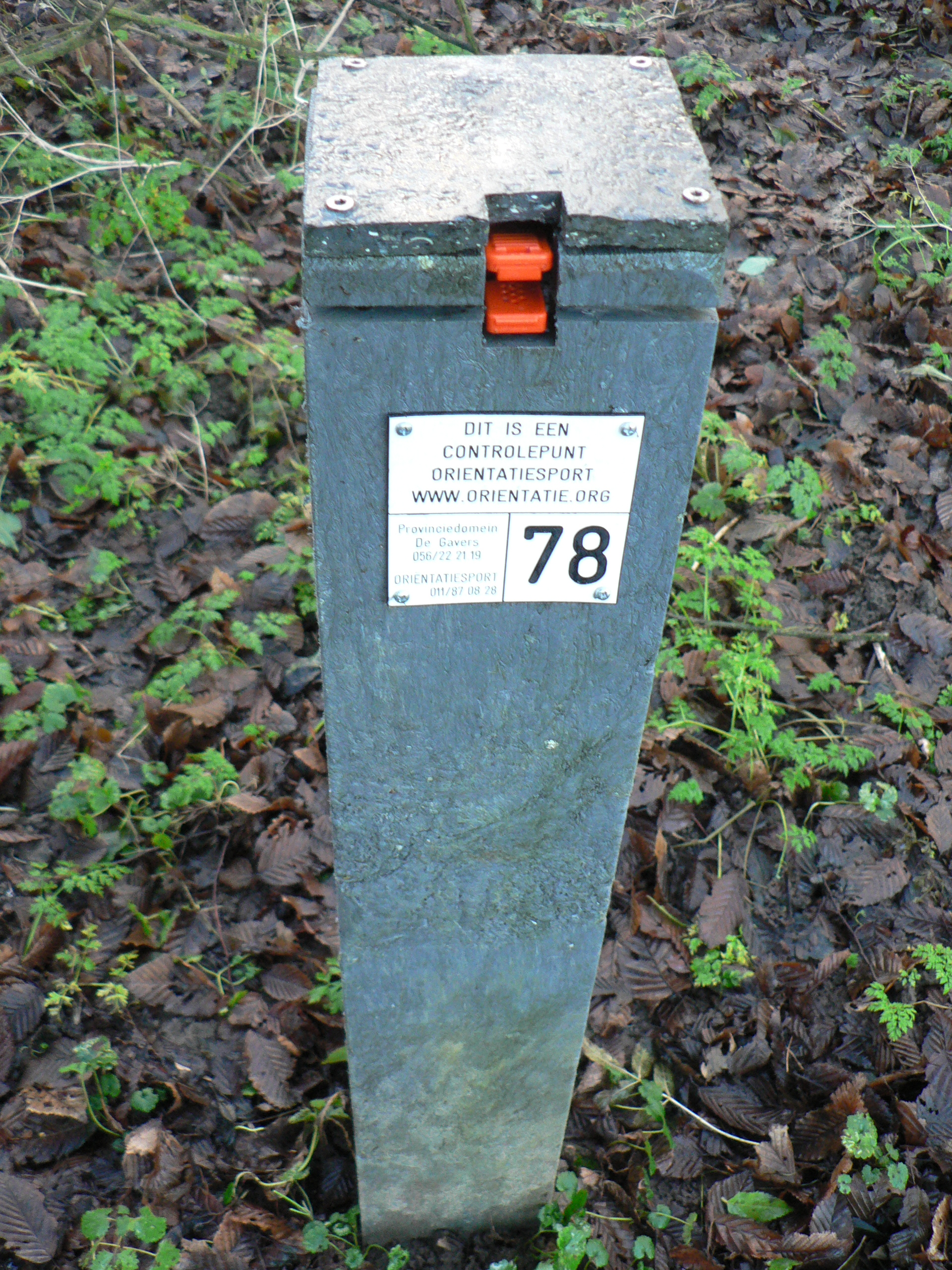
Control on a permanent course

A control point (CP; also called a control or checkpoint) is a marked waypoint used in orienteering and related sports such as rogaining and adventure racing. It is located in the competition area; marked both on an orienteering map and in the terrain, and described on a control description sheet. The control point must be identifiable on the map and on the ground.

A control point has three components: a high visibility item, known as a flag or kite; an identifier, known as a control code; and a recording mechanism for contestants to record proof that they visited the control point. The control point is usually temporary, except on a permanent orienteering course.

For events held under International Orienteering Federation (IOF) rules the kite has a triangular form with each face being about 30 cm × 30 cm (12 in × 12 in) and coloured white and orange. Most national governing bodies, and related sports use the same design. The earlier specification used white and red.

The location of control points is kept secret from the competitors until the start of the competition when they receive the map. The map may be pre-printed with the control points, or the competitor may be required to copy control points onto the map from a master map. Control points are selected and prepared anew for each competition. Permanent courses, with their permanent control points, are used primarily for training and recreation, but rarely for competition.

== History ==
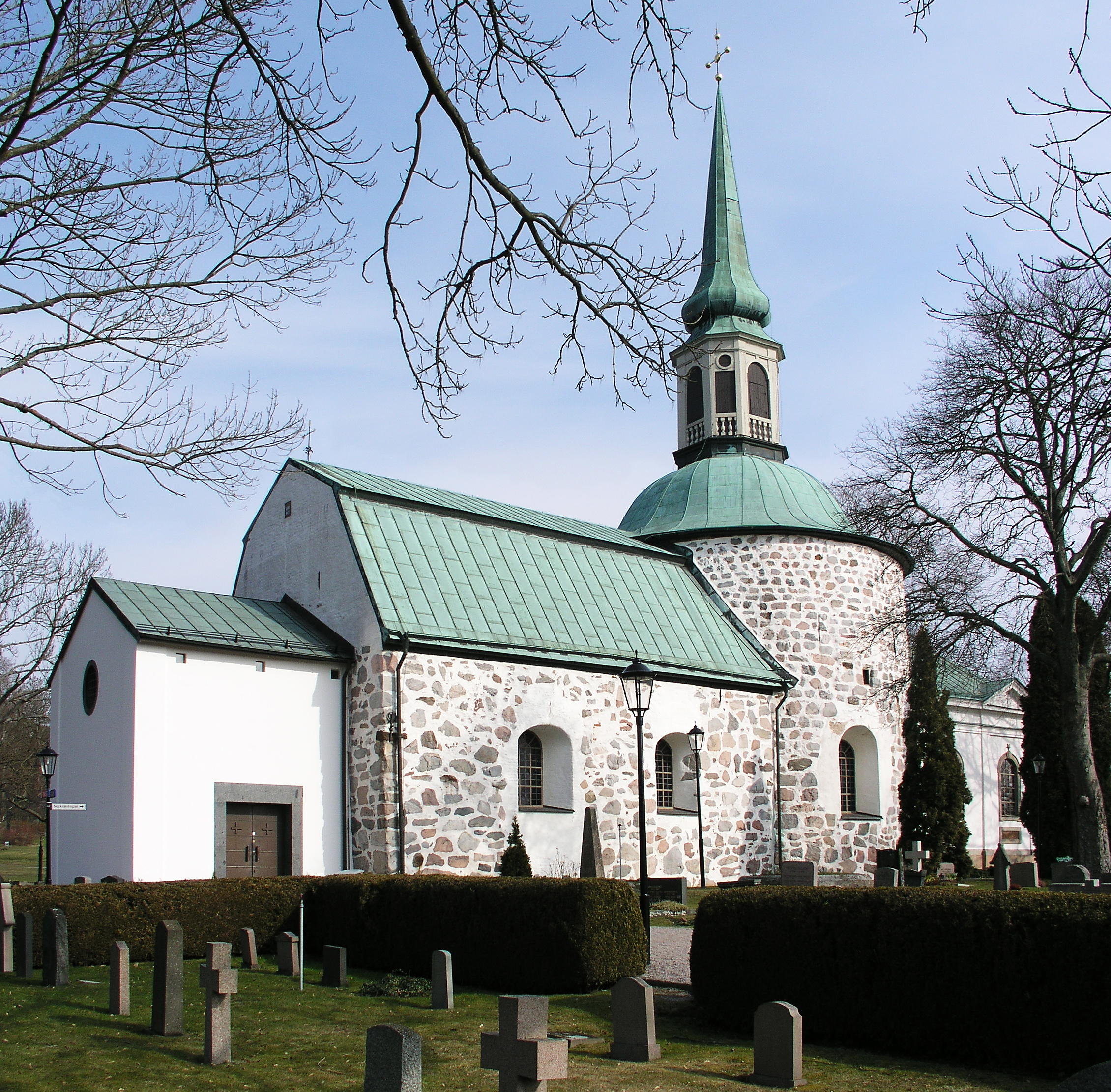
Bromma Church, used as an orienteering control point in 1901

In the early days, control points were staffed. Often the competitors were given at the outset only the location of the first control point and were given the next location by the control point staff, who also stamped the control cards.

The first public orienteering competition, in Norway in 1897, had three controls, at the farms Finnerud, Bjørnholt and Slakteren, while start and finish were on the farm Grøttum (see map in ref). The first Swedish public orienteering competition, near Stockholm in 1901, used two churches (Bromma and Spånga Church) and two large farms as control points.

== Control description sheet ==
Control description sheet for an orienteering course in Poland

In orienteering competitions the locations of the control points are described on a control description sheet (or clue sheet). It is sometimes incorrectly referred to as a "Course Description Sheet". For beginners, and the younger competitors, the description is written in a simple text format, but for advanced orienteers the descriptions use symbols (pictorial), in accordance with the IOF Control descriptions. These symbols eliminate any language-based confusion, vital for international competition. The control descriptions are fixed to or printed on the map, and separate control description sheets may be available at the prestart. Some competitors wear the extra control description sheet in a holder strapped onto their forearm, so that they can read it while running.

== Control card and punching ==
Each competitor is required to carry a control card, and to present it at the Start and hand it in at the Finish. The control card is marked by some means at each control point to show that the competitor has completed the course correctly.

In both trail orienteering and North American style mounted orienteering, it may not be feasible, safe, or permitted for the competitor to go to the control point itself. Instead, the competitor views the control point from a short distance and marks the control card with a pen. Several marking schemes are in use, including a pre-printed multiple choice form, and a "secret word" posted at the control point that the competitor must copy down.

In foot orienteering, the oldest form of orienteering, the first control cards were card stock with a perforated stub, the stub to be handed in at the Start as a safety check. At each control, originally, the control staff or the competitor rubber stamped the control card using a rubber stamp and inkpad kept at that control. Rubber stamps soon were replaced with ticket punches, usually with a different punch shape (circular, square, diamond, star, etc.) at each control. Card stock control cards are in limited use today, having been mostly replaced by weatherproof stock such as Tyvek. Ticket punches have been replaced by needle punches that punch a pattern of small holes in the control card (similar to a perfin).

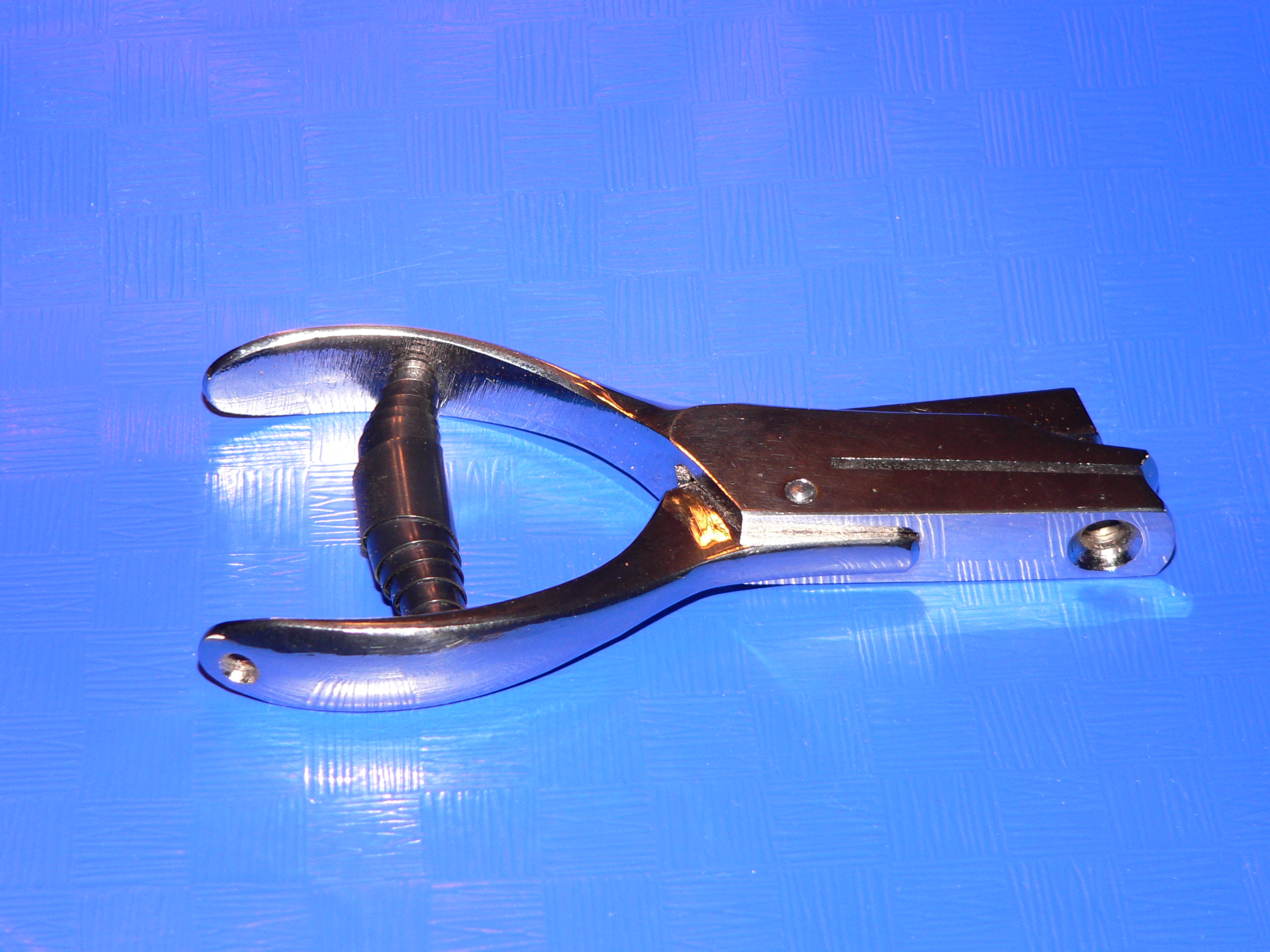
Ticket punch

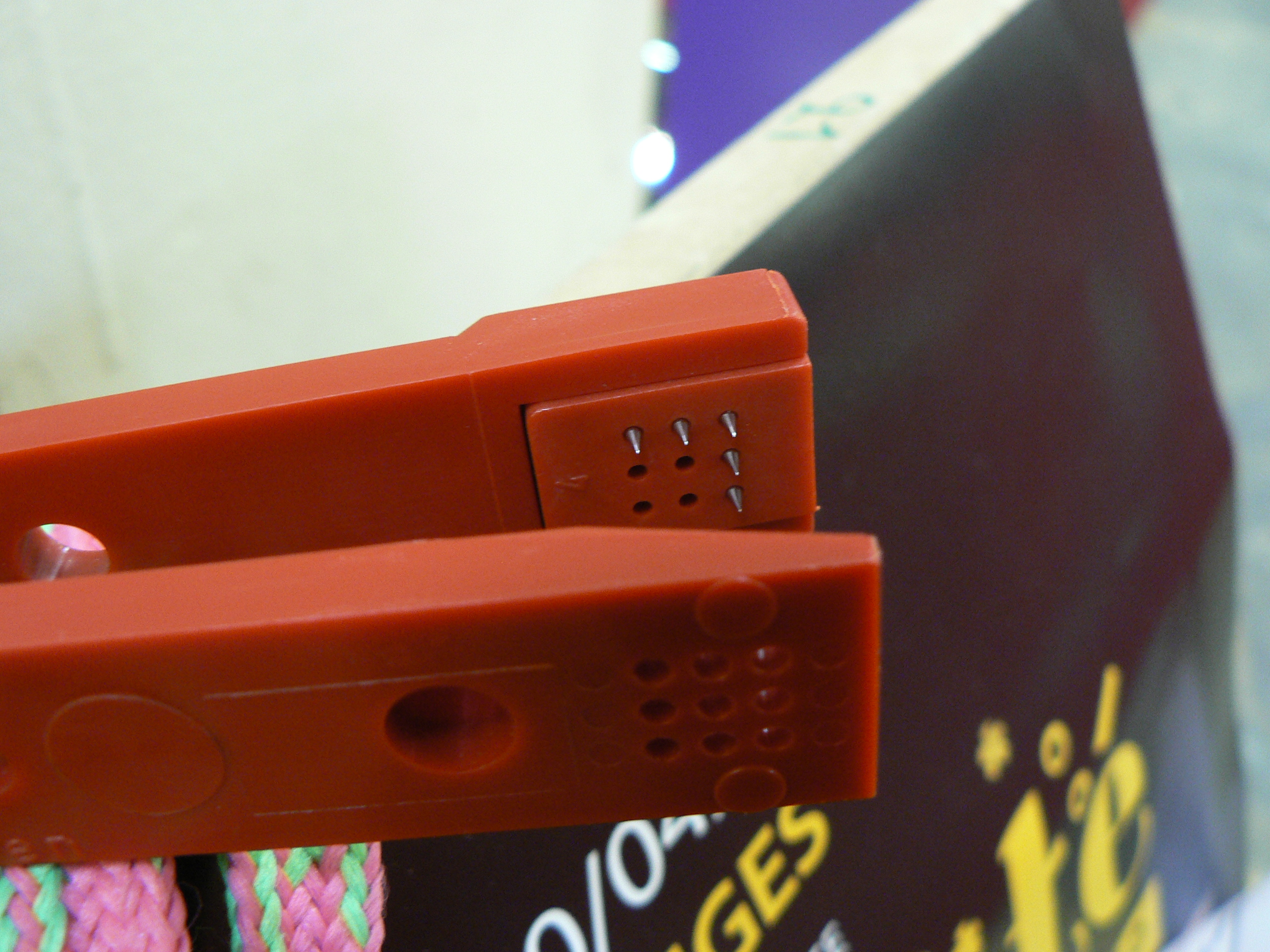
Needle punch

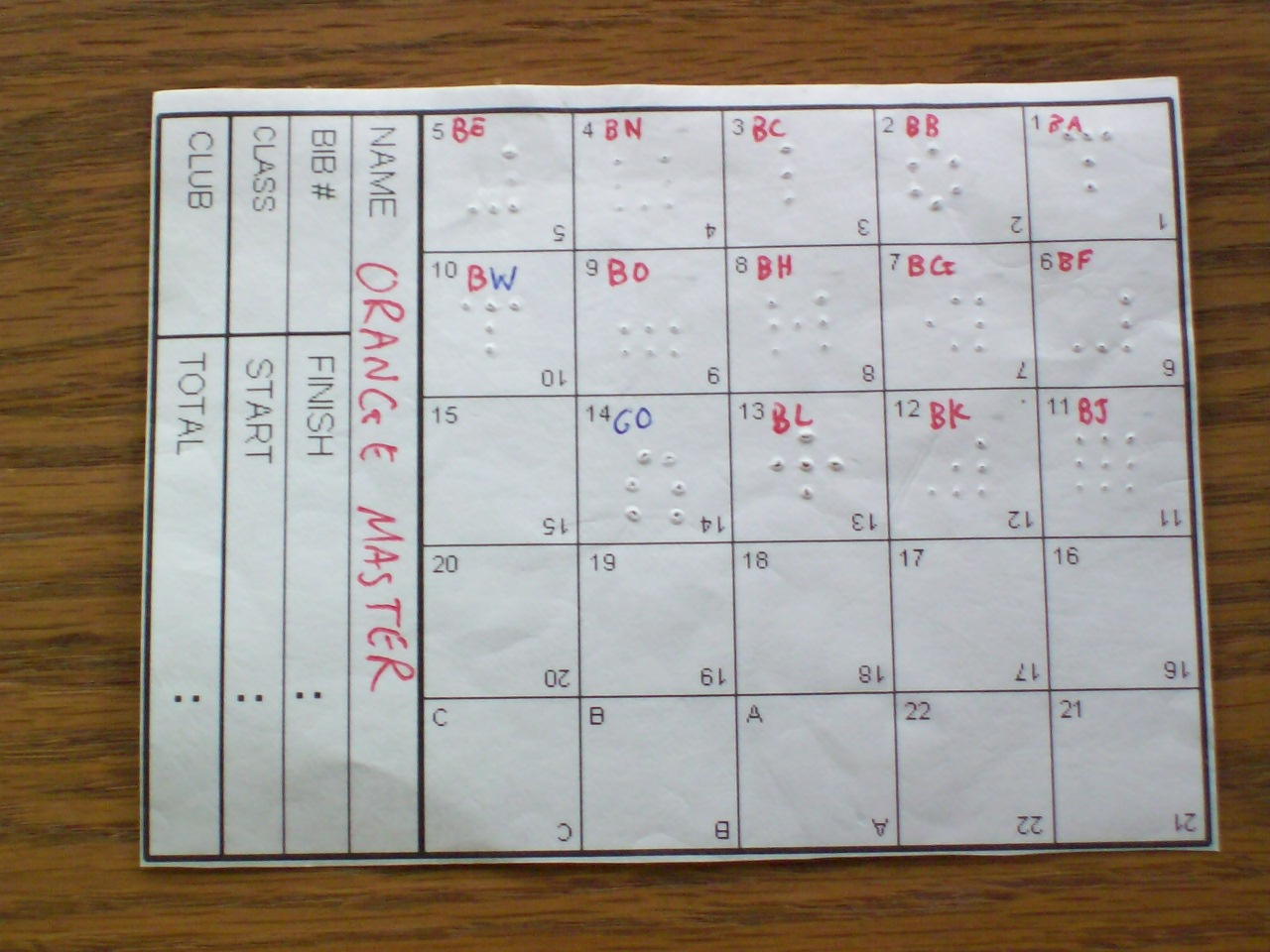
Control card marked with 14 different needle punches

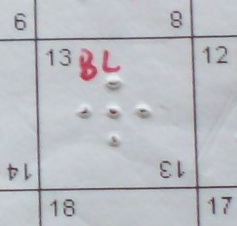
Close-up of same control card

Multiple choice control card used in TrailO

Weatherproof stock and needle punches are being replaced with electronic punch systems. The orienteer carries a small electronic control card that is a memory card encased in plastic and provided with a strap to attach to the finger. At each control point, and at the Start and Finish too, the orienteer inserts the card into a battery-operated station. There are two principal types of these, SPORTIdent and EMIT although newer technologies are starting to emerge using RFID wristbands timing or QR barcode timing such as iOrienteering. The SPORTIdent control card is a small plastic stick ("e-card" or "e-punch', also "dibber" and "fingerstick"). The EMIT control card is a larger, card-shaped stick with a built-in backup feature: a small paper card inside the control card is pierced by a pin in a specific location at each station.

In both electronic punch systems, the control code (number) and punch time at each control point are recorded on the card. At the finish, data on the card are copied to a computer and a receipt is printed to confirm or deny that the course has been completed correctly. A system has been developed to report these data by amateur radio. When a control card is punched, the reporting transmitter sends its own identifier and the orienteer's identifier and punch time. This is received at a base station, often located at the Finish, where the orienteer's progress on the course can be monitored and displayed to spectators.

The RFID and iOrienteering systems work differently. The RFID bands do not store any information but are simply used to record the runner 'dibbing' at the control box, the data being transmitted via the mobile phone data system back to the finish. it allows for instant/active viewing of positions and timings- but mobile reception is needed and this reduces it usability in some areas.

iOrienteering works but using the runners smart phone camera to record control points as they are passed. The information is stored on the phone and uploaded at the end of the run. It is more suitable to permanent courses or simple low key orienteering or navigation events, but can be used widely at low cost for almost any navigation event or challenge

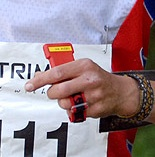
EMIT control card

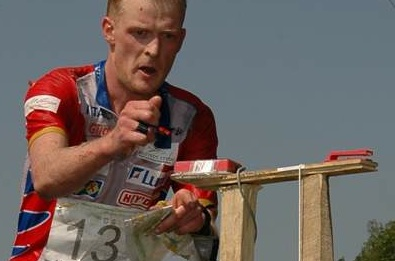
Orienteer using a SPORTIdent control card at a control point that has a needle punch for backup

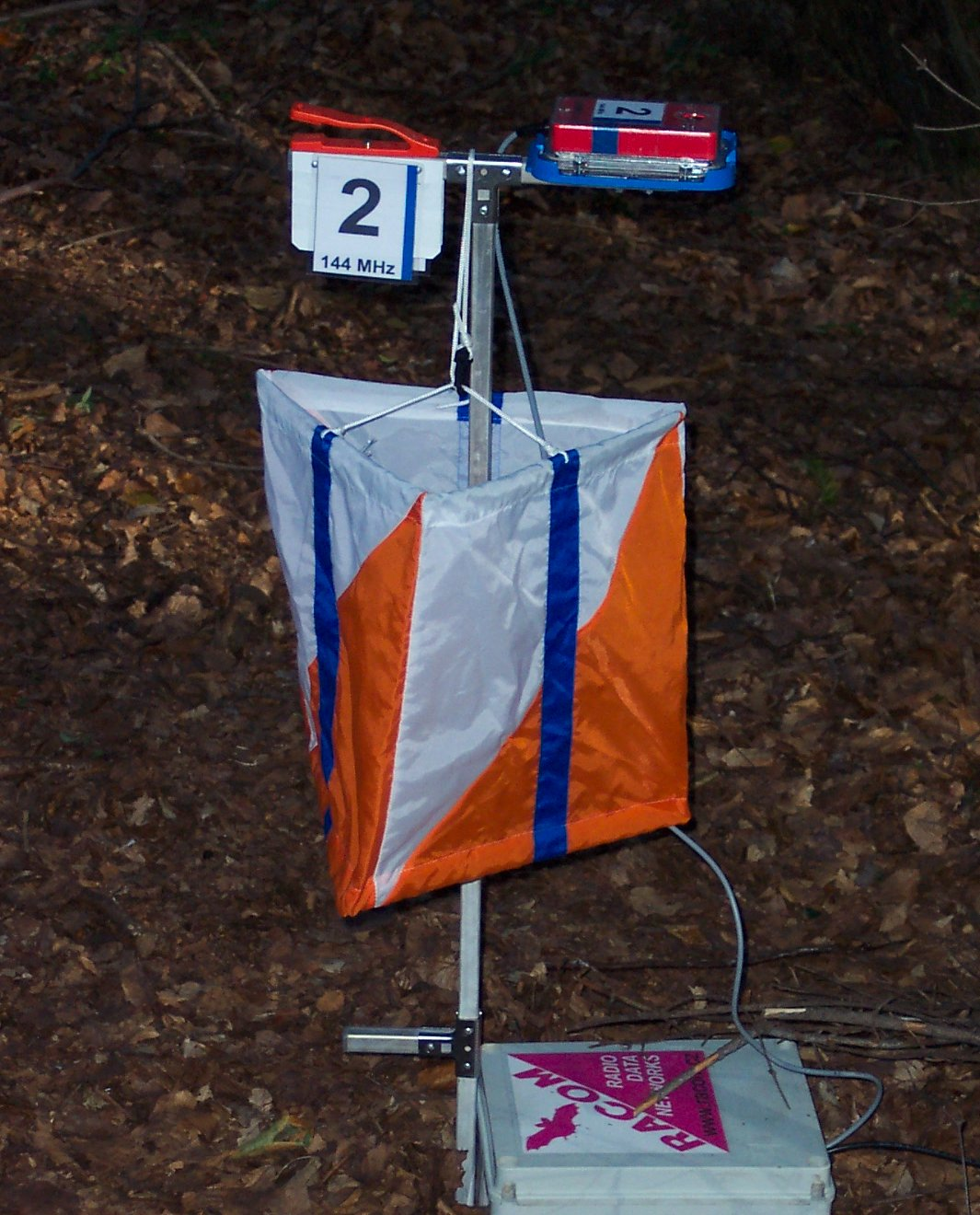
ARDF control point equipped with an electronic punch station and a radio transmitter that reports each use of the punch to a base station

== Exceptions ==
Notable exceptions to the above control point features occur in several orienteering sports.

- In amateur radio direction finding, the competitor uses a hand-held receiver to locate radio beacons at up to five control points that are not marked on the map. The Start, Finish, and optional drinking water stations are marked.
- In trail orienteering, the control point is marked on the map and up to five control kites are placed in that vicinity. The kites do not have a control code. From an observation point the competitor records which is the correct kite. In elite competition, "none" is a valid answer.
- In NACMO (North American) style mounted orienteering and fox Oring only the general vicinity of the control point is marked on the map. In both sports, the first objective is to navigate to the vicinity of the control point. Once there, the subsequent objectives are to find clues and take bearings, triangulate the location of the control point, then go directly to the control point. In mounted orienteering, once in the vicinity, the competitor searches for clues (called landmarks) on a description sheet. The description sheet gives bearings from each clue to the control point. In fox Oring, once in the vicinity, the competitor searches for a low power beacon at the control point.
- In TREC (European) style mounted orienteering, which permits no route choice, there are no control points for competitors but officials observe the competitors at specific points on the prescribed course.
