= Curb chain =

Piece of horse tack used with a curb bit

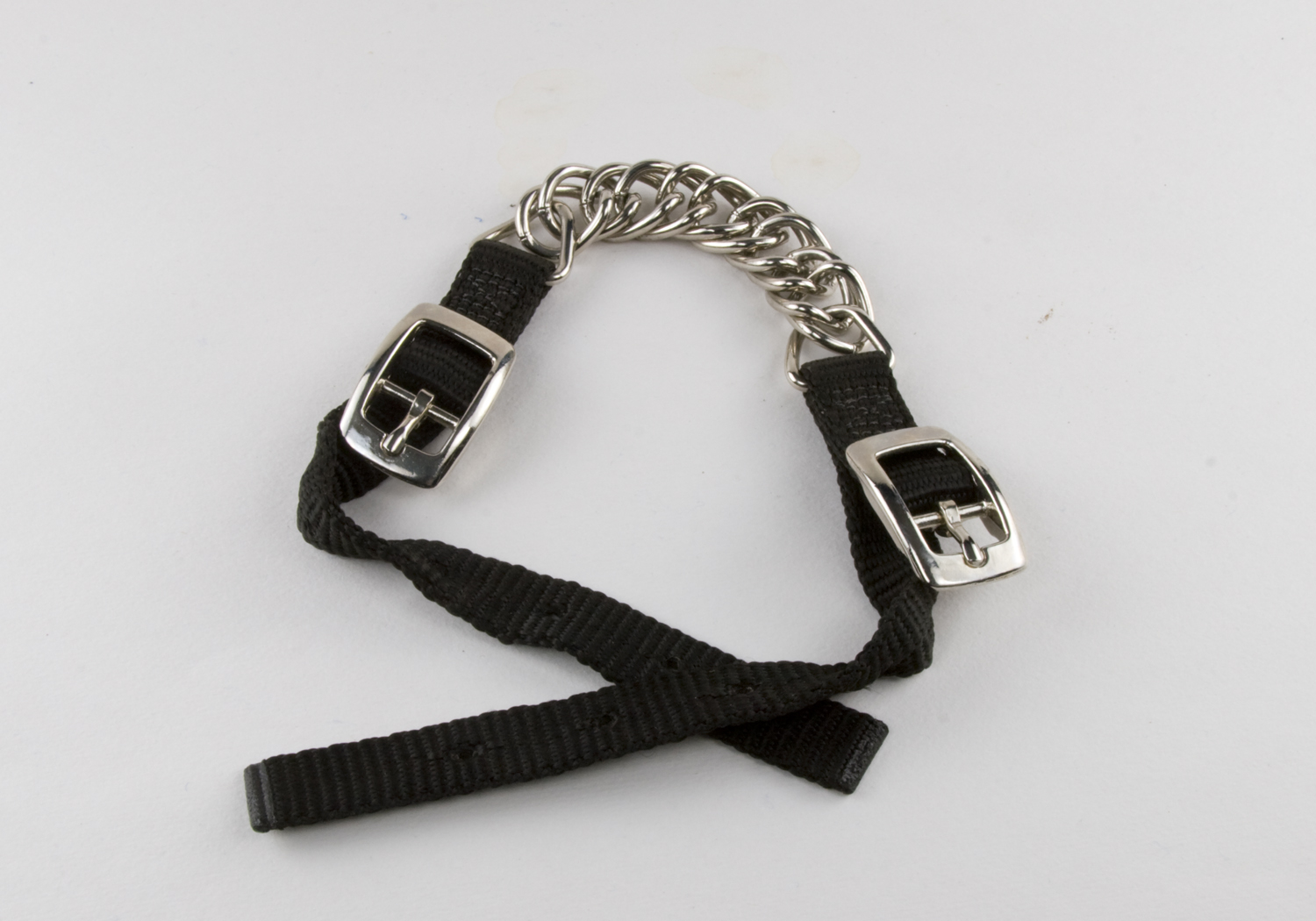
A curb chain for a western-style bit

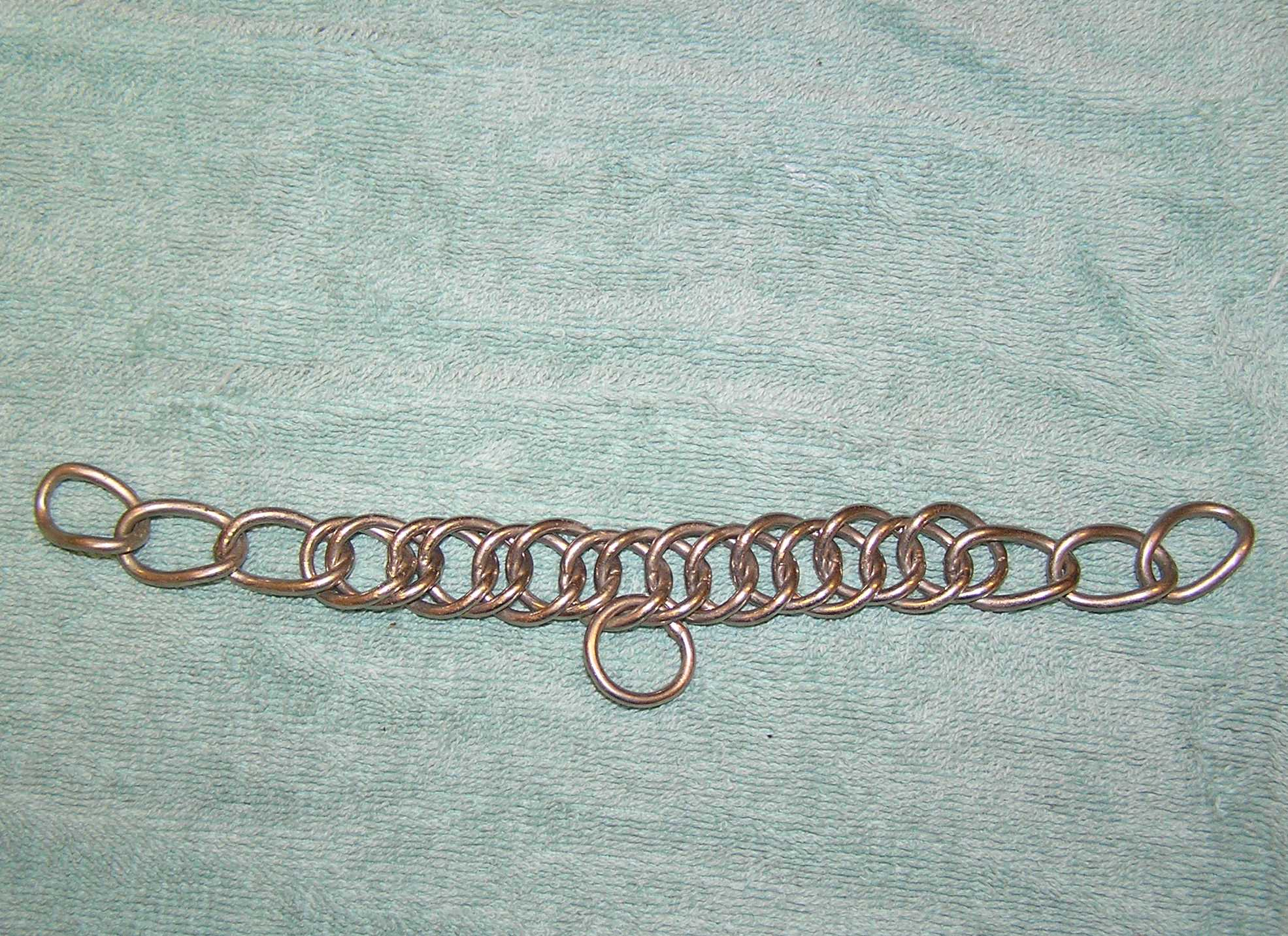
An English-style curb chain

A curb chain, or curb strap, is a piece of horse tack required for proper use on any type of curb bit. It is a flat linked chain or flat strap that runs under the chin groove of the horse, between the bit shank's purchase arms. It has a buckle or hook attachment and English designs have a "fly link" in the middle to hold a lip strap. On English bridles the horse is bridled with the curb chain undone on one side, then connected once on the horse. On western bridles, the curb chain is kept buckled to both sides of the bit.

== Action ==
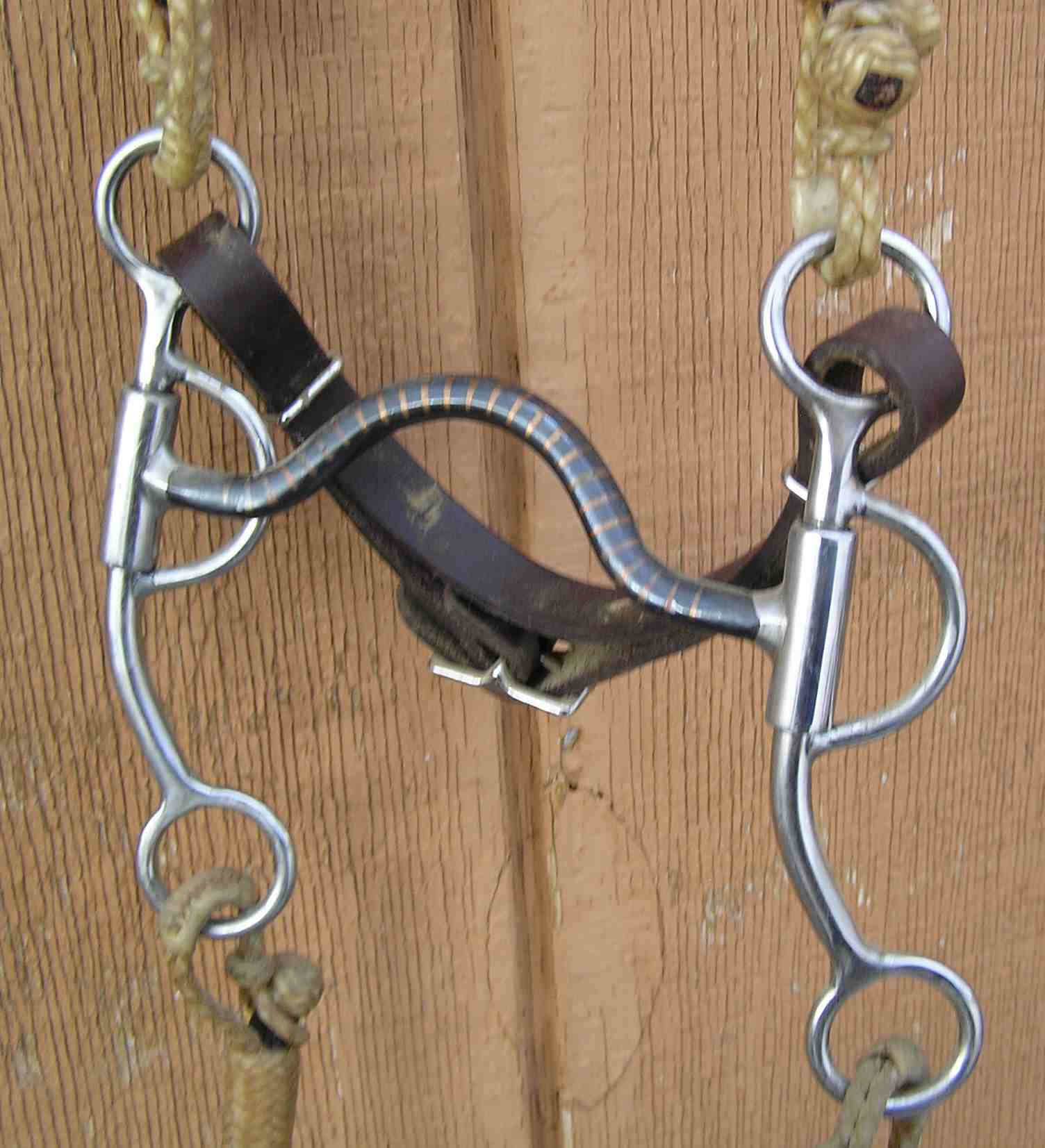
A curb strap on a Western style curb bit

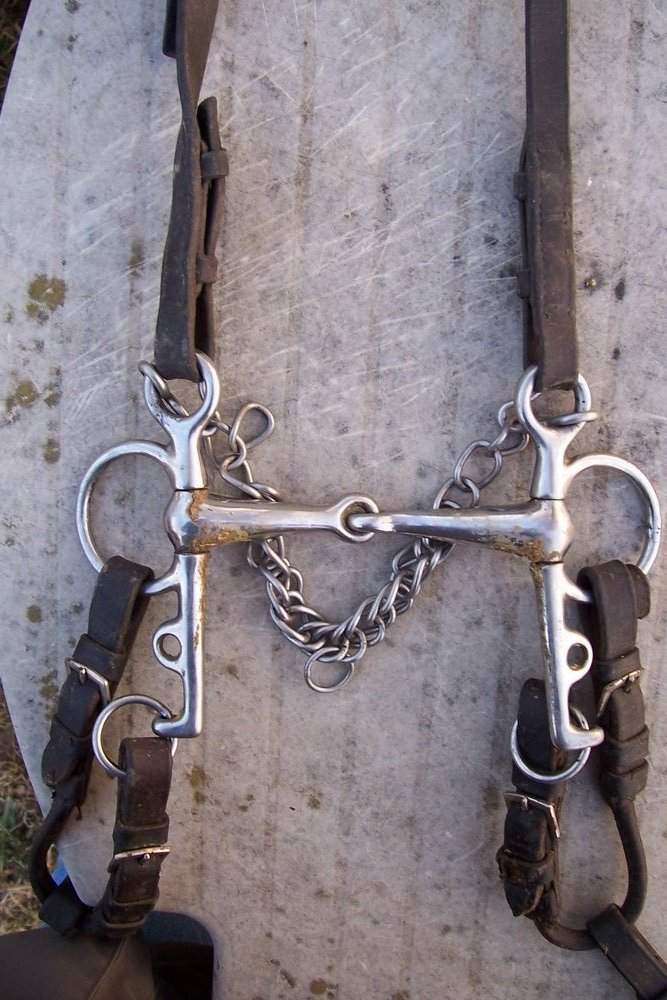
A curb chain on a Pelham bit

The main use of the curb chain is to enhance and control the lever action of a curb bit. Additionally, it helps to keep the bit steady and in place within the mouth. On English pelham and double bridles the curb chin is attached by a ring ("fly link" (UK)) to a lip strap, which helps keep the lip strap in place while the lip strap in turn prevents the curb chain from being lost if it becomes unhooked.

The curb chain applies pressure to the curb groove under a horse's chin when the curb rein of the bit is used. When the curb rein is pulled, the shank of the bit rotates back towards the chest of the horse and the cheek (upper shank) of the bit rotates forward (since it is a lever arm). The curb chain is attached to the rings at the end of the cheek, so, as the cheek moves forward, the chain is pulled and tightened in the curb groove. Once it comes in contact with the curb groove of the horse it acts as a fulcrum, causing the cannons of the bit mouthpiece to push down onto the horse's bars, thus amplifying the bit's pressure on the bars of the horse's mouth.

== Adjustment ==
The tightness of the curb chain has a great effect on the action of the bit. If used with no or a loose curb chain, it allows the shanks to rotate more before the curb chain is tight enough to act as a fulcrum and exert pressure. This extra rotation can warn the horse before pressure is exerted on his mouth, so he may respond beforehand. Conversely, a very loose curb chain can be undesirable, allowing the bit to rotate in the mouth too much, causing the port, especially a high port, to become too vertical and press against the palate, which is painful, can damage the mouth in extreme cases, and can cause the horse to gape. Additionally, it can completely nullify the correct action of the curb, making its use pointless.

There are two undesirable consequences when using a very tight curb chain. First, the bit immediately exerts curb pressure and increased pressure on the bars as soon as pressure is applied to the reins. Therefore, a tight curb chain is much harsher, and provides less finesse in signaling the horse than a looser curb chain would, as the horse is never given a chance to respond before the curb chain engages. Secondly, an extremely tight curb chain causes the mouthpiece to constantly push down on the sensitive tongue, never allowing the horse relief.

A curb chain is generally adjusted so it comes into action when the shank rotates 45 degrees back. However, skilled riders with experience with the curb bit may adjust the chain tighter to accommodate the needs of the individual horse, type of equipment, and training situation. However, keeping the curb chain looser allows more accommodation for rider error.

The curb chain should be applied by twisting it clockwise on one hook until it is flat, and then attaching it to the other hook. A twisted curb chain is far harsher in its effect than a flat one.

== Differences in chains ==
Curb chains vary in width and linkage. Thinner curb chains are more severe, ones that are too thin are banned in competition, and any curb chain could cause sores if the chain is not adjusted properly and used with discretion. For horses that are sensitive or that are rubbed by the chain, a cover made of rubber, neoprene, leather, or gel can be used, or a leather curb strap. However, it is important that the rider check that the curb is being used correctly and is not the cause of the rubs.
