= Trail orienteering =

Type of orienteering

- Trail orienteering logo
- Highest governing body: International Orienteering Federation
- Nicknames: TrailO

Characteristics
- Contact: No
- Team members: Individual
- Mixed-sex: Yes, with paralympic and open classes
- Type: Outdoor

Presence
- Olympic: No

Trail orienteering (TrailO) is an orienteering sport that involves precise reading of an orienteering map and the corresponding terrain. Trail orienteers must identify, in the terrain and in the presence of decoys, control points shown on the map. TrailO involves navigation skills but unlike most other forms of orienteering, it involves no point to point racing and little or no route choice. It is conducted usually on trails and because the objective is accuracy, not the speed of physical movement, the sport is accessible to physically disabled competitors on equal terms as able-bodied.

TrailO is one of four orienteering disciplines sanctioned by the International Orienteering Federation (IOF). European Championships in trail orienteering have been organised every year since 1994. The first ever World Cup in trail orienteering was held in 1999, and the inaugural World Trail Orienteering Championships were organised in 2004. The World Championships are now organised every year and were held in Vuokatti, Finland in 2013.

TrailO has been developed to offer everyone, including people with limited mobility, a chance to participate in a meaningful orienteering competition. Because control points are identified from a distance, and competitors are not allowed to leave the trails, participants with and without physical disabilities compete on level terms.

Unlike other forms of orienteering which involve the competitors physically visiting the control and punch it, trail orienteering is done in form of multiple choice questions, where all questions are in the form which flag is placed at the control on the map, and the possible answers are one of the flag (A, B, etc.) seen from the decision point, or none (Z).

== Formats ==
There are three official competition formats at World Trail Orienteering Championships: PreO, TempO and TrailO Relay.

=== PreO ===
PreO (precision orienteering) is the traditional form of trail orienteering. Competitors are given a map at the start. The locations of the controls, the start and the finish are marked on the map, as in traditional orienteering. At each site, there are a number of control flags (which is called by a Latin letter A, B, C, D or E, determined at the decision point from left to right but not shown physically), but only one or none correctly represent the control marked on the map. The competitors have to stay on trails as shown on the map and look at the control at a specified location on the trail, which is called the decision point (DP). Decision points are marked on the ground, but not on the map. The sole purpose of the decision point is to determine which flags are A, B, C, D or E, which is needed to make the answer. Competitors are allowed to move along the trail to observe, but need to choose the answer at the decision point. Each correct answer scores one point, and wrong answer scores zero point.

In addition, there may be a few timed controls in a PreO course, which is used for tie breaking only. They are not included in the total points (starting from 2014 rules) but only have the time taken.

=== TempO ===
A TempO course has timed controls only. The competitors are ranked according to their time taken, which is the time needed to answer all controls and 30 seconds penalty for each incorrect answer, including blank and multiple answers.

In each timed station, competitors are required to sit at a designated place, at which all control flags can be seen clearly. The flags are labelled from the left to the right, using the NATO phonetic alphabet (alpha, bravo, charlie, delta, echo, foxtrot). They are given a set of maps including only the area around the controls, one for each question, and have to point at the correct answer on a plate showing A, B, C, D, E, F, Z, or speak out the answer orally (alpha, bravo, charlie, delta, echo, foxtrot, zero) as quickly as possible.

=== Night ===
A night course is similar to a normal PreO course except that reflective markers are used on control point flags. Competitors use a headlamp to see.

=== Relay ===
The TrailO relay is a team event of 3, where every team member has to complete a precision orienteering course first and a timed part afterwards.

The official format used in World Trail Orienteering Championships is as follow:

- The start is a mass start, with a time limit set on the precision orienteering course shared by all three members.
- The precision orienteering course consists of a number of controls, which must be a multiple of 3, where each member has to complete exactly one-third of the course in any order. For example, if there are 27 controls on the precision orienteering course, the first team member answers any 9 of them, the second answers any 9 out of remaining 18, and the third answers the remaining 9.
- The transition is done in a transition area marked clearly on the map, just like in the FootO counterpart, however, each team member gets an identical map.
- No communication among team members is allowed, except when at transition the previously teammate may pass a team sheet, which only indicates which controls are answered (but not the answer themselves) and nothing else.
- After transition, the first and second team members are led to timed stations (which may be different for each leg), which is run using TempO rules with possible zero (Z) answer and 30 seconds penalty for each incorrect answer.
- The final score is calculated by adding all team members' time used at timed stations, plus 30 seconds penalty for each wrong answer at timed controls, and 60 seconds penalty for each point deduction (mistake or exceeding the overall time limit) in the precision course.
- The timed station for the third (final) leg is the final. When the third team member finishes the precision course, they are placed into a quarantine zone for the score calculation, and introduced into the timed station in reverse standing (i.e. longest time used first).

There is also an alternative format, which resembles more to the FootO counterpart, where the only difference to the format above is in the precision orienteering course:

- All team members share the same control sites, where each team member must visit in order, but the answers for each leg may be different.
- The combinations for the controls may be different among teams, but all teams answers the same overall combination. (akin to the forking of FootO relay)

== Zero answer ==
In advanced level of trail orienteering, apart from A, B, C, etc. which indicate the flag is the control shown on the map, there may also be the possibility for the answer to be Z (pronounced as zero), indicating there is no flag correctly placed at the control shown on the map.

How far a flag must be placed off the correct location for a control to be considered as zero answer (zero tolerance) is a highly debated topic.

== Mobility aids ==
Apart from a combustion-engine vehicle, any recognised mobility aids are permitted. Requested physical assistance is also permitted.

== Map ==
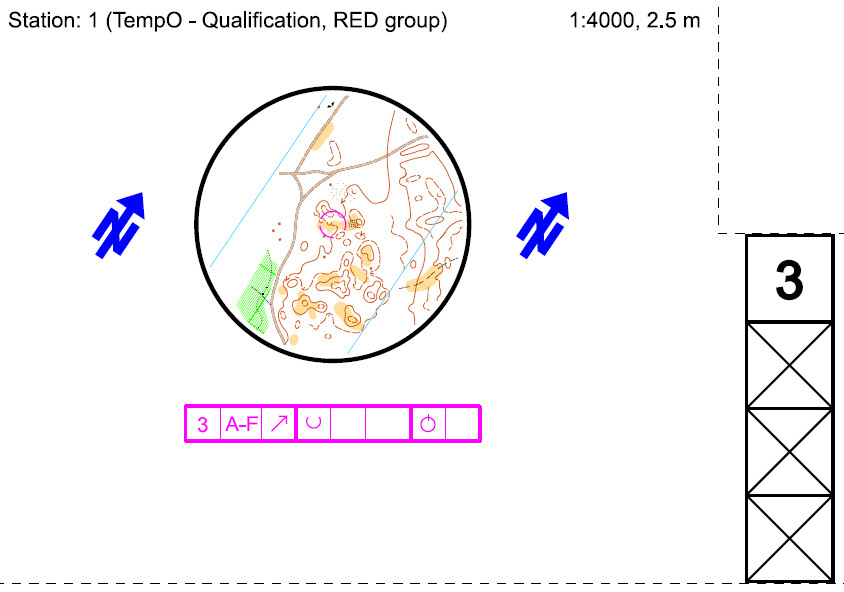
TempO competition map made by TiM (ETOC 2018 Bratislava)

The orienteering map is in ISSOM, usually at 1:5000 or 1:4000 scale.

For timed and TempO controls, maps must be prepared in a very complicated way (the map must be rotated and the sheet is completed by control descriptions, North arrow, pointing board etc.). This process can be facilitated by a special program TiM.

== Control card ==
A sample control card used in trail orienteering

In PreO competitions, traditional paper control cards or e-cards may be used. Mobile applications on tablets and smartphones are tested as punching devices, nowadays.

Traditional paper control cards are in form of a multiple-choice control card, which contain an official copy and a competitor copy, and folded in halves to make them overlap when the control card is punched. Before the competition, the name, number and class is filled, and the start and finish times are marked like in traditional orienteering. Moreover, There are fields for officials to record the times and answers at timed stations. The answers are recorded by punching the control card using the punch provided near the decision point for each control (or, in some competitions, carried by the competitor). Multiple punches or punches out-of-the-box are always considered wrong answers.

If e-cards are used, there are two forms of punching the answer:

- There are multiple units (labelled A, B, C, etc.) for each control located near the decision point. The competitor carries one e-card and tap the e-card at the unit of the chosen answer (e.g. SPORTident).
- There are one unit for each control located near the decision point. The competitor carries a set of contactless cards, labelled A, B, C, etc., and tap the card of the chosen answer at the unit. (e.g. ToePunch).

In TempO competitions, the current approach is to register answers and the time used by an application (ANT) on a mobile device. The former way is to mark data on a paper by the officials at the timed stations and to submit it to the organizer.
